= List of mills owned by the Lancashire Cotton Corporation Limited =

The Lancashire Cotton Corporation Limited was incorporated 23 January 1929, and became the world's largest spinner of cotton. It acquired 104 mills and closed about half to reduce capacity. In 1950, it operated 53 cotton mills.

== The 1950 mills (A–D) ==
Name	Architect	Location	Built	Demolished	Served (Years)
Ace		Hollinwood, Oldham 53°31′52″N 2°09′23″W			
	Notes: The 5 storey mill, has a floor area of 38500 sq ft. It is now used as a warehouse. It was powered by a 2500 hp cross compound engine (Mary and Elizabeth) by Urmson & Thompson built in 1920. It had a 26 ft flywheel with 42 ropes that ran at 64 rpm.				
Ainsworth		Breightmet, Bolton 53°34′42″N 2°22′16″W			
	Notes: LCC tried to extend their activities into bleaching and dyeing. It bought Ainsworth Mill for mercerising.				
Atlas		Ashton-under-Lyne 53°29′43″N 2°05′48″W	1900	1994	94
	Notes: Atlas Mill, Waterloo. was last spinning mill still working, although with artificial fibres, It was demolished in 1994 and the site is now a housing estate.				
Arkwright		Rochdale 53°37′33″N 2°08′20″W	1885		141
	Notes: Ring and doubling. ring frame by Howard and Bullough, Accrington. The mill is demolished and the land put to housing.				
Blackridings		Oldham 53°32′14″N 2°08′08″W			
	Notes: 1951: Baled Waste for export. Recently Electrical works.				
Bolton Union Mill		Bolton 53°35′00″N 2°26′15″W			
	Notes: Still standing. 15,466.00 sq m of floor space. Driven by 1200 hp tandem compound engine by J Musgrave, It had a 32 ft flywheel with 28 ropes operated at 50 rpm				
Brunswick	David Bellhouse	Ancoats, Manchester 53°29′07″N 2°12′51″W	1840		186
	Notes: Brunswick Mill, Bradford Road alongside the Ashton Canal, was a seven-storey mill with 35 loading bays facing directly onto the canal, with a smaller three 3/4 story block of warehouses and offices backing onto Bradford Road. The Brunswick Mill was one of the largest in Britain at that time and by the 1850s held some 276 carding machines, and 77,000 mule spindles. 20 drawing frames, fifty slubbing frames and eighty one roving frames. In 2008– it is a shopping complex of 139 m^{2}, and 130 residential units.				
Cedar		Ashton-under-Lyne 53°29′51″N 2°04′52″W	1905	1970	61
	Notes: in Hurst, Ashton-under-Lyne off the Queens Road. It was powered by an Inverted vertical inline triple 1200/1500? hp engine supplied by George Saxon & Co in 1905. It had a 22 ft flywheel with 28 ropes, operating at 75 rpm. It worked through to 1966. The mill was closed by Courtaulds in 1980, and was later demolished. The site has been used for housing.				
Century		Farnworth 53°32′43″N 2°24′40″W			
	Notes: Century mill stands but the use has changed. It has 16,674.00 sq m of floorspace.				
Coppull		Coppull, Chorley 53°37′38″N 2°39′41″W			
	Notes: Notes: This was a ring mill. The mill is now used as an enterprise centre. It was driven by a-1600 hp triple-expansion four-cylinder engine by J & E Wood built in 1906. Its 26 ft flywheel operated at 68 rpm and ran 36 ropes.				
Dawn	P.S. Stott	Eastway, Shaw and Crompton 53°34′34″N 2°05′32″W	1901	2006	105
	Notes: on the site of Shaw Mill at the 'dawn' of the 20th century Dawn mill was equipped with mule weft spindles in 1950. It was powered by Engines named 'Venus' and 'Mars', 1800 hp twin tandem compound engine by George Saxon of Manchester, 1902. Two 20"HP, two 40"LP X 5 ft stroke (180 psi, 64 rpm. 26 ft flywheel, 35 ropes. Corliss valves on all cylinders). Then it was sold on and up until 2005, was home to distribution company DTS Logistics and used for storing and distributing clothing. It was demolished in 2006 to make way for an Asda supermarket.				

== The 1950 mills (E–J) ==
Name	Architect	Location	Built	Demolished	Served (Years)
Elder		Romiley, Marple 53°24′41″N 2°05′47″W			
	Notes: Elder Mill was powered by a 600 hp vertical cross compound engine by Daniel Adamson, installed in 1937. It had a 3 ft stroke. It ran at 106 rpm. The flywheel was 16 ft.				
Empress	P.S. Stott?	Ince, Wigan 53°32′35″N 2°36′34″W	1907	1975	68
	Notes: Empress was a rare single storey spinning mill. In 1951 it had been re-equipped with rings, and spun general-purpose 14's. This was the last working spinning mill in Wigan				
Fox		Hollinwood, Oldham 53°31′12″N 2°08′05″W		1990?	
	Notes: Powered by 1800 hp single Manhattan engine by George Saxon, 1909. 28"HP (vertical),57"LP X 4 ft 6 in stroke. 180 psi, 78½ rpm. 22 ft flywheel, 36 ropes.				
Foxsons		Staincliffe, Dewsbury 53°42′15″N 1°38′56″W		c1973	
	Notes: Site now re-landscaped.				
Harp		Castleton, Rochdale 53°35′38″N 2°10′23″W			
	Notes: Castleton joined the Borough of Rochdale in 1899. Queensway, Castleton was a hub of cotton mills including the three 't', Th'Arrow, Th'Harp, and Th'Ensor. The 1908 Castleton map includes: Marland Cotton Mill, Castleton Cotton Mill, Globe Works (Textile Machinery), Arrow Cotton Mill, Harp Cotton Mill, Globe Leather Works, Castleton Size Works and Castleton Iron Works. Today the Harp is industrial units.				
Hawk	A. Turner	Store Street, Shaw and Crompton 53°34′59″N 2°05′33″W	1908	1991	83
	Notes: Hawk was bought by LCC for 42,00, 21 April 1931 (Oldham Chronicle). It had 102280 mule spindles, producing 130000 lbs a week. Driven by 1700 hp cross compound engine by Yates & Thom built 1909. It had a 24 ft flywheel with 40 ropes operating at 71½ rpm.				
Heron	P.S.Stott	Hollinwood, Oldham 53°31′27″N 2°07′36″W	1905	1960	55
	Notes: Designed by architect P.S.Stott Heron mill was built in 1905 by the Heron Mill Company Ltd. Taken over in the 1930s by the Lancashire Cotton Corporation when "cotton was king", it ceased production in 1960. From 1961 it was occupied by Courtaulds Ltd as offices and warehouse with some experimental manufacture until 1994. It was driven by a 1400 hp vertical cross compound engine by George Saxon, 1902. It had a 16 ft flywheel with 32 ropes which operated at 80 rpm.				
Imperial	Sydney Stott	Wallace Street/Gorse Street Greenbank Blackburn 53°45′09″N 2°27′25″W	1902		124
	Notes: Wallace Street/Gorse Street Greenbank c.1900 was Grade II listed in 1974. Owned by Imperial Ring Mill (Blackburn) Ltd. (1902–30) spinners later by The Lancashire Cotton Corporation, and then Courtaulds. Production ceased in 1980 but the building still stands (minus its chimney).				
Junction		Middleton Junction 53°32′28″N 2°10′04″W			
	Notes: In 1891, 73,476 spindles, 301/341 twist,46, /520 weft. Now demolished.				

== The 1950 mills (K–N) ==
Name	Architectb	Location	Built	Demolished	Served (Years)
Kingston		Chestergate, Stockport 53°24′31″N 2°10′11″W	before 1891		
	Notes: 1891, Lucas Micholls, and Co, Kingston Mill, Chestergate; 33,460 spindles, 38/458. In 1951 coarser ring spun yarns from the 2010s (decade)to 24's				
Kent	G Stott	Chadderton 53°33′00″N 2°08′10″W	1908	1994	83
	Notes: Cotton spinning mill built in 1908 by Kent Mill Ltd. In 1950, LCC had converted it from a mule mill to ring mill for Egyptian cotton. Latterly part of the Courtaulds Group. Architect was G Stott. 104,000 spindles. 1500 horsepower cross compound George Saxon steam engine (25"HP, 52"LP X 5 ft 6 in stroke. 160 psi, 64 rpm. 26 ft flywheel, 28 ropes. Corliss valves on both cylinders). Mill closed 1991 and demolished 1994.				
Laurel		Middleton Junction 53°32′43″N 2°10′11″W	1905		32
	Notes: at the same time as the Bay Tree mill. It was sold in June 1937, at that time it had 119520 mule spindles. 1951– Baled Waste for export				
Magnet	F.W.Dixon	Denton Lane, Chadderton 53°32′16″N 2°08′46″W	1902	c. 1966	
	Notes: This factory was built by the Magnet Mill Ltd. in 1902, but purchased by the Lancashire Cotton Corporation in the 1930s. It was later taken over by the Courtaulds Group. Ceased textile production in December 1966 and was demolished soon after. A suburban residential estate now occupies this site. It was driven by a 2200 hp twin tandem compound engine by George Saxon, Openshaw, 1903. It had 27 ft flywheel, 35 ropes operating at 64½ rpm				
Malta		Middleton 53°32′53″N 2°10′09″W			
	Notes: Driven by a 1200 hp vertical triple-expansion engine by Buckley & Taylor, 1904. It had a 22 ft flywheel, 32 ropes operating at 72 rpm.				
Manor	George Stott	Victoria Street, Chadderton 53°32′57″N 2°08′09″W	1906	1990	84
	Notes: Grade II listed. Designed by George Stott, the Manor Mill was erected in 1906, and is characterised by its impressive copper-covered dome after the Byzantine style. The mill ceased cotton processing in 1932, but was reopened in 1940 by the Lancashire Cotton Corporation. It finally closed in 1990. It had been intended that the building would become a heritage centre, but this scheme has now been abandoned. Its sister mill, the Kent, designed by George Stott in 1908 was demolished in 1994. Driven by a 1500 hp cross compound engine by George Saxon, 1907. It had a 26 ft flywheel, 30 ropes operating at 64½ rpm.				
Majestic		Waterhead, Oldham 53°32′51″N 2°04′21″W			
	Notes: This is a doubling mill, that by 1950 had been re-equipped with 9" lift ring doublers. The Steam engine had been removed, and all machines were electrically driven.				
Mars		Castleton, Rochdale 53°35′49″N 2°11′10″W		1960s	
	Notes: Driven by a 1700 hp cross compound engine by Urmson & Thompson, 1908 similar to the one in Royton Ring Mill. Probably had a 24 ft flywheel.				
Mavis		Coppull, Chorley 53°37′38″N 2°39′46″W			
	Notes: Mavis was built alongside the Coppull Ring Mill, which still survives under a change of use: Mavis is a car park. Driven by a 2000 hp triple-expansion four-cylinder engine by J and E Wood, 1909. It had a 26 ft flywheel, 36 ropes				
May		Pemberton, Wigan 53°31′39″N 2°40′11″W	1889	1980	91
	Notes: on the site of Wilde's Mill, a woollen mill was built in 1850 and destroyed by fire 13 June 1859. A second mill, known as Roper's mill was built and this also burnt down, The fire started in the engine house. In January 1889, the "May Mill Spinning Company limited" was formed to build a new fireproof mill to replace the one destroyed. The cornerstone was laid 25 March 1889, and the engines were dedicated May 1890. They were named Louisa and Helen. May No 1 was driven by 800 hp cross compound engine by B Goodfellow, 1892. It had a 20 ft flywheel, 24 ropes operating at 62 rpm. The boilers were 30 ft by 8 ft high-pressure Lancashire boilers. The mill was lit by electricity generated by a Parson's dynamo. May No 2 was driven by a 1500 hp cross compound engine by Ashton Frost, 1901. This had a 28 ft flywheel, 34 ropes operating at 62 rpm. In 1946 May Mill had 77,964 ring spindles, but by 1948 this had fallen to 72,984. It was re-equipped around 1950. Between 1960 and 1962 the mill was converted to electric ring spinning frames. The mill was eventually taken over by Courtaulds in 1962—3 to produce carpet fibre and this it continued to do until the final closure on Friday, 17 October 1980. At the invitation of the assistant manager, Mr. Bill Crank, the Winstanleys visited May Mill in September 1980. They said "Although we expected to see some old spinning machines, we were very surprised to find so many still in use; in fact, there was very little new machinery. Many of the machines were pre-1920, and some dated to about the turn of the 20th century. Slubber and drawing frames were said to be part of the original May Mill equipment These were made in 1902 by Howard & Bullough of Accrington. Numerous carding frames by Platt Brothers of Oldham were dated 1905, 1907 and 1920, but some of these had been converted to suit Courtaulds' needs. Fly frames, also made by Howard & Bullough, were dated 1915. The scutchers made by Platt Brothers, were built in 1921 and 1924. Cone winders by Geo. Hattersley were made about 1950. Perhaps the most modern machines were ring spinning frames, dated 1967."				
Mons (formerly Hare)	Abraham Stott	Todmorden 53°43′17″N 2°06′24″W	1907	1968	61
	Notes: Seven-storeyed steam-powered cotton-spinning mill built for the Hare Spinning Company Limited. It was constructed of red Accrington brick, designed by Abraham Stott. Stott's design utilised rolled steel columns and reinforced concrete, and was unpopular when it was first proposed. The first sod was cut on 1 June 1907. The final cost of the mill was £218,285. There were financial and board-room problems and the mill finally opened in August 1912. A second identical mill was proposed, but never built. There was the logo of a white hare on the mill chimney. The company was wound up in 1914. The mill was bought by William Hopwood for £131,450. He sold it to the newly formed Mons Mill Company Limited and the mill was renamed Mons Mill (after the Battle of Mons). There was a later company Mons Mill (1919) Limited which took over the mill in 1919. The mill was originally powered by an engine built by Carel Frères of Belgium which drove about 73 belts. In the 1950s, it was bought by the Lancashire Cotton Corporation which, in 1964, was taken over by Courtaulds. In 1968, the mill closed. From 1971, the building was used by Ward & Goldstone Limited until the 1990s when they left. In the 1970s, the mill chimney was reduced by 30 ft. In 1986, the mill chimney and the engine house were demolished. The site was cleared in March 2000.				
Monton		Eccles 53°29′27″N 2°21′31″W	1906		120
	Notes: Now demolished and replaced with housing. It was driven by a 1400 hp inverted vertical cross compound engine by George Saxon built in 1906.				
Newby formerly Elm Mill	Joseph Stott	Linney Lane, Shaw and Crompton 53°34′51″N 2°05′09″W	1890		136
	Notes: Opened as Elm mill in 1890 but the name was later changed to Newby. In 1950 it was a mule spindle mill supplying mule weft and twist. In 2008, now named Shaw No 3, it is part of Littlewoods' Shaw National Distribution Centre who have adapted it for warehousing and bulk storage for their catalogue distribution operations. It's linked by a new building to Lily (No.2) mill and by a bridge to a newer building that occupies the site of Rutland mill. Signs of its cotton heritage can still be seen including its engine house with original crane system which is still largely intact.				

== The 1950 mills (O–T) ==
Name	Architect	Location	Built	Demolished	Served (Years)
Orme	F.W.Dixon	Waterhead Oldham 53°32′53″N 2°04′26″W	1908	1960	52
	Notes: Four floors from 29493 sq ft, 9425 sq m (103,820 sq ft) in total. Driven by a George Saxon, 1250 hp engine. It weighed 22 tons and drove a 22 ft flywheel. In 1915 it had 62000 rings. In 1960 it was taken over by Ferranti, it stands (2009) in mixed industrial use and is up for sale at £1,900,000.				
Pilot		Bury SD 812,09953°35′06″N 2°17′06″W			
	Notes: In 2008 the mill and engine house remain, the chimney is gone. Occupied by a luggage manufacturer. Driven by 2000 hp triple-expansion four-cylinder engine by J & E Wood, 1906. 23 1/2-inch (600 mm) HP, 36 1/2-inch (930 mm) IP, two 40-inch (1,000 mm) LP X 5-foot (1.5 m) stroke. 200 psi, 66½ rpm. 24-foot (7.3 m) flywheel, 46 ropes.				
Regent	George Stott	Failsworth 53°30′31″N 2°09′37″W	1906	1958, 1966	
	Notes: Plans extant in Oldham Local Studies Centre. This was designed as a ring mill (thus lower head room was required than in a mule mill) it was 345 feet (105 m)by 130 feet (40 m) It was four storeys high. The cellar contained a warehouse, yarn cellar, waste room, cotton room, and dust room; the first floor was the card room; the second floor was the ring frame room; and the third floor was the winding, warping, and beaming room. It was powered by a marine type vertical triple-expansion engines built by Buckley & Taylor of Oldham in 1906 with 1,800 installed horsepower. The engine had a 63-inch-diameter (1,600 mm) low-pressure cylinder and was sometimes loaded to 2,000 ihp. It ran until 1958, when it was scrapped. It ran 60000 spindles. There was a 26 feet (7.9 m) flywheel, 26 ropes operated at 64 rpm. The mill was acquired by the LCC around 1930. The chimney was 210 feet (64 m), it and the boiler house were demolished in 1964. It is now owned by Salton.				
Rock		Ashton-under-Lyne 53°29′54″N 2°06′07″W	1893	1971	78
	Notes: Rock Mill, Wilshaw Lane and Oldham Road, Waterloo, was built on the site of the earlier Wilshaw Mill, making use of its octagonal chimney. Rock Mill was demolished in 1971 for the construction of an Asda store. Driven by a 1250 hp triple-expansion four-cylinder engine by George Saxon, 1892. It had a 16-foot (4.9 m) geared flywheel, 18" wide.				
Royd	A.J.Howcroft	Oldham 53°31′36″N 2°07′58″W			
	Notes: Driven by a 900 hp inverted vertical triple-expansion engine by J & E Wood, 1907. It had a 14/16 ft flywheel with 20 ropes, operating at 94 rpm. The original three Tetlow boilers still supplied steam at 180 psi, when in 1961 electric drives were installed, Watkins records: The Lancashire Cotton Corporation, Royd Mill, Hollinwood. Cotton Spinning. Royd, built in 1907, was one of the smaller mills, the engine built by J & E Wood of Bolton developing 900 hp. The cylinders, of 18.5, 28.5, and 43in bore by 3 ft 6 in stroke, were all fitted with Corliss-valves, which in contrast to the maker's usual practice were fitted at the opposite sides of the cylinders. It ran at 94 rpm, driving by 20 ropes from a 14 ft flywheel. The original three Tetlow boilers still supplied steam at 180 psi, when by 1961 electric drives were installed, and the engine was scrapped. The frame was unusual since there were only two columns in front, with twin feet to the single casting bed, the intermediate cylinder being supported by a massive cross casting. In 1915, it had 80,000 spindles by Asa Lees, and Howard & Bullough.				
Royton Ring Mill	P S Stott	Royton 53°33′17″N 2°07′09″W	1908, ex.1912		
	Notes: Driven by a 1700 hp cross compound engine by Urmson & Thompson, 1908 similar to the one in Mars Mill. It had a 24 ft flywheel. In 1915 it had 64,176 ring and 6400 doubling spindles.				
Rutland	F.W. Dixon & Son	Linney Lane, Shaw and Crompton 53°34′51″N 2°05′15″W	1907	1993	86
	Notes: and run by Rutland Mill Ltd. It was driven by a 1700 hp cross compound engine by George Saxon of Manchester, built in 1908, but altered in 1913. It had a 26 ft flywheel with 35 ropes operating at 67 rpm then 68 rpm. In 1950, in LCC ownership it had both 96,000 ring and 20,000 mule spindles. By 1964, it was in the Courtaulds Group. In the late 1980s, as Courtaulds moved operations to other parts of the world, the mill was bought by Littlewoods. Under the Littlewoods name it was run as warehousing for a short time before it was demolished and replaced by a new automated storage warehouse.				
Saxon		Droylsden 53°29′07″N 2°08′39″W	1906		120
	Notes: It was driven by a 1500 hp cross compound engine by Daniel Adamson built in 1907. It had a 24 ft flywheel with 36 ropes which operated at 65½ rpm. New Cylinders by George Saxon, were fitted in 1915.				
Stalybridge		Stalybridge 53°28′56″N 2°03′51″W			
	Notes: Bridge Street, 75,000 spindles in 1887. In 87,000 spindles, 348/388 twist, 408/528 weft. It was originally driven by 1000 hp twin tandem compound engine by Goodfellow and Matthews built in 1868. It had a 30 ft flywheel with 27 ropes that operated at 55 rpm. It was rebuilt in 1925(?) by Scott & Hodgson as a 1600 hp engine.				
Texas		Ashton-under-Lyne 53°29′00″N 2°05′12″W		1971	
	Notes: It was driven by a 1500 hp vertical three-cylinder compound engine by George Saxon, Openshaw, which was altered in 1921. It had a 22 ft flywheel mounted at end of shaft driving 28 ropes which operated at 78 rpm. Courtaulds used the mill for synthetics. Destroyed by fire in the 1971.				
Textile	Potts, Pickup & Dixon	Cobden St, Chadderton 53°32′35″N 2°08′25″W			
	Notes: In 1915, 98436 spindles – used by Platt as a show mill. Closed in 1927. Remained empty until after the war when LCC bought it for storage of Baled Waste for export, part of it burned out in 1950. Courtaulds sold it in 1961. The use for cotton waste continued. In 1996 it was reduced to 2 storeys.				
Trencherfield		Wigan 53°32′28″N 2°38′16″W			
	Notes: It was driven by 2,500 hp triple-expansion four-cylinder engine by J & E Wood of Bolton built in 1907. The engines were called 'Rina' and Helen'. They drove a 26 ft flywheel with 54 ropes at 68 rpm. Now part of the Wigan Pier redevelopment area. The 2500 hp steam engine has been restored and operates as a visitor attraction.				
Trent	F.W. Dixon & Son	Duchess Street, Shaw and Crompton 53°35′07″N 2°05′42″W	1908	1967–1969	
	Notes: Dual purpose, mule yarns: twist and weft- ring yarns, −1800 hp cross compound engine by George Saxon of Manchester, 1907. 30"HP, 60"LP X 5 ft stroke. 180 psi, 65 rpm. 26 ft flywheel, 40 ropes. Corliss valves on both cylinders. Air pumps driven from each crosshead. It opened in 1908 and closed in 1929. It was reopened by LCC in 1938 and closed again in 1962, and demolished in 1967. In 1915, it had 120,000 spindles by Platt. The site is in industrial use.				
Tudor		Ashton-under-Lyne 53°29′00″N 2°05′56″W	1906	1970	64
	Notes: Driven by an 1800 hp triple-expansion vertical engine by George Saxon, Openshaw built in 1906. It had an 18 ft flywheel, 40 ropes operating at 75 rpm. Tudor Mill, next to the Ashton Canal Warehouse at Portland Basin, opened in 1903. It ceased spinning cotton in the 1960s and was used as a warehouse until it was destroyed by fire in 1970.				

== The 1950 mills (U–Z) ==
Name	Architect	Location	Built	Demolished	Served (Years)
Waterside		Ashton 53°29′00″N 2°05′10″W			
	Notes: Ring mill				
Welkin Mill		Lower Bredbury, Stockport 53°25′10″N 2°08′04″W			
	Notes: Ring mill producing 1940s to 1950s. Housing Buckleys printers, until the firm collapsed in October 2008.				
Wilton Mill, Radcliffe		Radcliffe 53°33′41″N 2°19′06″W			
	Notes: Driven by a 1500 hp triple-expansion four-cylinder engine by W & J Galloway & Sons, Manchester built in 1908. It had a 26 ft flywheel, 37 ropes operating at 63 rpm.				

== Other Mills that were owned before 1951 ==
Name	Architect	Location	Built	Demolished	Served (Years)
Alexandra Mill		Acre Lane, Oldham 1868			
	Notes: Architect N.Rucroft. Engine (1) Woolstenhulme & Rye 1868 (2) Buckley & Taylor 800 hp 1905. The first owner was Robert Stott, then sold to Stott & Thatcher. In 1929 LCC rented the mill- it was demolished in 1936				
Vernon		Portwood, Stockport 53°24′51″N 2°08′47″W			
	Notes:				
Palmer Mills, Stockport		Portwood, Stockport 53°24′46″N 2°08′51″W			
	Notes: Built around 1820 alongside the river Goyt, the remains can be seen from the St Mary's Way bridge. It is under the Courts furniture store.				
India		Stockport			
Orrell's Mill aka Travis Brook Mill		Travis Street, Heaton Norris SJ 886903 53°24′32″N 2°10′23″W	1834		192
	Notes: A historical significant mill that is used as a principal example in Andrew Ure's book. It pioneered the use of the cast iron I beam. It was built by William Fairbairn for Ralph Orrell. Originally a six-storey combined mill 280 ft by 50 ft, with side wings. It was designed to house 125,000 throstle and 33,000 mule spindles. Later in 1887 it was recorded as having 140,000 spindles and 1000 power looms. The original beam engine was replaced around 1912, and a new separate engine house built. At this time a rope race was added to the mill to replace the former fixed vertical main shaft. It was damaged by fire in the 1960s, and one storey was removed, and was demolished in the ?1980s.				
Durban Mill		Oldham 53°31′28″N 2°07′52″W			
	Notes: Mr Fletcher. 1800 hp triple-expansion four-cylinder engine by Yates and Thom, 1906. 24"HP, 29"IP, two 38"LP X 5 ft 6 in stroke. 180 psi, 65 rpm. 27 ft, 67 ton flywheel, 38 ropes. Corliss valves on all cylinders. Guide under block between cylinders. Air pump driven from each crosshead.				
Moston Mill		Moston	1910		116
	Notes: 1600 hp right handed, tandem compound engine by Carel Freres, Ghent, order number 875, 1909. 30"HP, 53"LP X 4 ft stroke. 160 psi, 90 rpm. 21 ft flywheel, 62 tons, ? ropes. Drop valves on both cylinders. Airpump driven from crank pin. Tail rod support guide. This engine was originally going to be a twin tandem. Crank and trunk guide casting on the left. [Watkins records: Moston Mill, Moston, Nr Manchester. Cotton Spinning. Intended to be a double mill eventually, Moston was built with the crankshaft, and flywheel for the full power, and provided with the bed for the other half the engine upon which the outer end of the crankshaft ran. Built by Carels Brothers, Ghent, Belgium in 1909, it was their works no 875, with cylinders 30 and 53 bore by 3 ft 11 1/4 in stroke. Developing 1,200 hp at 90 rpm, superheated steam 200 psi was supplied by Tetlow boilers. The flywheel, 19 ft in diameter, was provided with the sixty rope grooves that the full power would have required. The second half of the mill, however, was never completed, and in 1958 electric drives were installed, and the engine was scrapped. Typical of Continent design, six or more of Carels' engines were installed in Lancashire mills in the early 20th century.]				
