= Imperial Mill, Blackburn =

Cotton mill in Blackburn, Lancashire, England

- Location in Blackburn

Spinning (ring mill)
- Location: Blackburn, Lancashire, England
- Serving canal: Leeds and Liverpool Canal
- Owner: Imperial Ring Mill (Blackburn) Ltd. (1902-30)
- Further ownership: Lancashire Cotton Corporation (1930s); Courtaulds (1964)
- Coordinates: 53.7524°N 2.4570°W

Construction
- Completed: 1902

Design team
- Architect: Sydney Stott

Power
- Engine maker: Yates and Thom
- Engine type: triple expansion compound
- Transmission type: rope

Equipment

Listed Building – Grade II
- Designated: 1974

Imperial Mill, Blackburn is a cotton spinning mill at Wallace and Gorse Street in Greenbank, Blackburn, Lancashire, England. It was designed by P.S. Stott, built in 1901, on the banks of the Leeds and Liverpool Canal. It was taken over by the Lancashire Cotton Corporation in the 1929's and production finished in 1980.

== Location ==
At 184 miles (296 km) north-northwest of London, Blackburn stands 401 feet (122 m) above sea level, 8.9 miles (14.3 km) east of Preston and 21 miles (34 km) north-northeast of Manchester. The Ribble Valley and West Pennine Moors lie to the north and south respectively. Blackburn experiences a temperate maritime climate, like much of the British Isles, with relatively cool summers and mild winters. There is regular but generally light precipitation throughout the year.

Although the city of Preston, the administrative centre for Lancashire, is located about 9.2 miles (14.8 km) to the west, Blackburn is the largest municipality in what is known as East Lancashire. The town is bounded on other sides by smaller towns, including Accrington to the east and Darwen to the south. Blackburn and Darwen together make up Blackburn with Darwen unitary authority. The village of Wilpshire, is 2.5 miles (4.0 km) north of Blackburn, and forms part of the Blackburn urban area, although it is in the Ribble Valley local government district. Other nearby villages are Langho, approximately 1.2 miles (1.9 km) further to the north-east, and Mellor to the north west of Blackburn. 11 miles (18 km) further to the east lies the town of Burnley. The geology of the Blackburn area yields numerous resources which underpinned its development as a centre of manufacturing during the Industrial Revolution. Mineable coal seams have been used since the mid-late 16th century. The Coal Measures in the area overlie the Millstone Grit which has been quarried in the past for millstones and, along with local limestone deposits, used as a construction material for roads and buildings. Blackburn was bisected by the Leeds and Liverpool Canal which provided a transport facility for the earlier mills, but by the time that Imperial Mill was built this was less important.

== History ==
In 1797 the first purpose-built spinning mill was constructed in Blackburn, and by 1824 there were 24 such mills. By 1870 there were 2.5 million spindles in Blackburn, with 24 spinning mills having been constructed since 1850. Spinning declined in the town between 1870 and 1900, as this sector of the cotton industry moved to South Lancashire.

Blackburn was principally a weaving town, and in the 1890s had suffered hard times. In 1890, Blackburn's Chamber of Commerce recognised that the town was over-dependent on the cotton industry, warning of the dangers of "only having one string to their bow in Blackburn". The Imperial Mill, was opened in 1901. It was designed as a large spinning mill using the cheaper to operate ring frame. As it was far closer that the traditional mule mills in Oldham, the local weaving sheds could save on the rail freight charges on their raw material. Again, unusual for Blackburn it was financed by a share issue in the manner of the Oldham Limiteds; previously in Blackburn, new mills had been built only when profit from existing mills had accumulated so the mill could be paid for out right.

The industry produced 8 billion yards of cloth at its peak in 1912. The Great War of 1914- 1918 halted the supply of raw cotton, and the British government encouraged its colonies to build mills to spin and weave cotton. Certain towns were harder hit, as they had specialised in forms of cotton that were only required in markets where the link had been severed. After the war was over Lancashire never regained its markets and the independent mills were struggling. The Bank of England set up the Lancashire Cotton Corporation in 1929 to attempt to rationalise and save the industry. Imperial Mill, Blackburn was one of 104 mills bought by the LCC, and one of the 53 mills that survived through to 1950. It was taken over be Courtaulds and spinning stopped in 1980. The chimney was demolished in 1958, but the mill was left mostly intact. The Mill has been the base for the Lancashire Saw Company up to the present day.

== Architecture ==
Imperial Mill is a red brick ring mill of dignified proportions from the early 20th century, it opened in 1901. It stands three and four storeys tall, with stringcourses and pilasters. It was designed by Sydney Stott for Imperial Ring Mill (Blackburn) Ltd. (1902-30). It has a long rectangular plan, 17 bays long and 5 bays wide, with rows of large close-set 8-paned windows. It was surmounted by two copper covered domed towers. The centrally located engine-house projects at a right angle towards the canal, with 6 round-arched windows on the long sides, and 2 Gothic-traceried round-arched windows on the canal end. There is a staircase tower on the north angle, with round-arched grouped windows on top floor. The chimney, demolished in 1958, was free standing.

=== Power ===
The centrally located engine house originally housed a triple-expansion engine manufactured in the town by Yates and Thom.

=== Equipment ===
It originally it housed some 70,000 ring spindles, the number was increased in 1906–07. The centrally located engine house originally housed a triple expansion engine manufactured in the town by Yates and Thom. A weaving shed was added in 1907. Spinning ceased in 1980.

== Usage ==
=== Owners ===
- Imperial Ring Mill (Blackburn) Ltd. (1902-1930)
- Lancashire Cotton Corporation (1930's-1964)
- Courtaulds (1964-1980)

Until 2023 owned by Lancashire Saw Company Ltd Now owned by Blackburn with Darwen Borough Council since February 2023

== See also ==
- Textile manufacturing
- Cotton Mill

== Bibliography ==
- Dunkerley, Philip (2009). "Dunkerley-Tuson Family Website, The Regent Cotton Mill, Failsworth". Archived from the original on 23 March 2008.
- Beattie, Derek (1992). Blackburn: The Development of a Lancashire Cotton Town. Keele University Press. ISBN 1-85331-021-2.
- LCC (1951). The mills and organisation of the Lancashire Cotton Corporation Limited. Blackfriars House, Manchester: Lancashire Cotton Corporation Limited.
- Roberts, A S (1921), "Arthur Robert's Engine List", Arthur Roberts Black Book., One guy from Barlick-Book Transcription, archived from the original on 23 July 2011
- Taylor, Andrew (2000). 20th Century Blackburn. Wharncliffe Books. ISBN 1-871647-89-4.
