= Hawk Mill, Shaw =

Cotton mill in Greater Manchester, England

Hawk Mill

- Location in Greater Manchester

Spinning (mule mill)
- Location: Store Street, Shaw, Greater Manchester, England
- Further ownership: Lancashire Cotton Corporation (1930s); Courtaulds (1964)
- Coordinates: 53.5831°N 2.0924°W

Construction
- Completed: 1908
- Demolished: 1991

Design team
- Architect: A. Turner

Power
- Date: 1909
- Engine maker: Yates & Thom
- Engine type: cross compound engine
- Cylinder diameter and throw: 30"HP, 61"LP X 4ft 6"
- rpm: 71rpm
- Installed horse power (ihp): 1700hp
- Flywheel diameter: 24ft
- Transmission type: rope
- No. of ropes: 40

Boiler configuration
- Boilers: Twin Lancashire, coal fired
- Pressure: 180psi

Equipment
- Mule Frames: 102280 mule spindles

Hawk Mill, Shaw was a cotton spinning mill in Shaw, Oldham, Greater Manchester. It was built in 1908. It was taken over by the Lancashire Cotton Corporation in the 1931 and passed to Courtaulds in 1964. The mill closed in 1967, and was demolished in 1991.

== Location ==
Shaw and Crompton is a town and civil parish within the Metropolitan Borough of Oldham, in Greater Manchester, England. It lies on the River Beal at the foothills of the Pennines, 2.3 miles (3.7 km) north of Oldham, 3.6 miles (5.8 km) southeast of Rochdale, and 8.7 miles (14 km) to the northeast of the city of Manchester. It is regularly referred to as Shaw. It is not served by any canal but a rail service was provided by the Oldham Loop Line, built in 1863 by the Lancashire and Yorkshire Railway.

== History ==
The manufacture of textiles in Crompton can be traced back to 1474, when a lease dated from that year outlines that the occupant of Crompton Park had spinning wheels, cards and looms, all of which suggest that cloth was being produced in large quantities. The upland geography of the area constrained the output of crop growing, and so prior to industrialisation the area was used for grazing sheep, which provided the raw material for a local woollen weaving trade. Until the mid-18th century, Crompton's textile sector had been closely linked with that of Rochdale and Saddleworth in the north and east; it was a woollen manufacturing district. However, as the demand for cotton goods increased, Crompton mirrored developments in Oldham and Manchester in the south and southwest, importing raw cotton and making cotton cloth.

Oldham rose to prominence during the 19th century as an international centre of textile manufacture. It was a boomtown of the Industrial Revolution, and amongst the first ever industrialised towns, rapidly becoming "one of the most important centres of cotton and textile industries in England", spinning Oldham counts, the coarser counts of cotton.

It was in the second half of the 19th century, that Oldham became the world centre for spinning cotton yarn. This was due in a large part to the formation of limited liability companies known as Oldham Limiteds. In 1851, over 30% of Oldham's population was employed within the textile sector, compared to 5% across Great Britain. At its zenith, it was the most productive cotton spinning mill town in the world. When suitable land in Oldham had become scarce in the 1860s, there was a mill building boom in Shaw and Crompton, giving rise to the area as major mill town. The local townscape became dominated by distinctive rectangular brick-built mills, and its former villages and hamlets agglomerated as a single town around these factories. Shaw and Crompton railway station and a goods yard was opened in 1863, allowing improved transportation of textile goods and raw materials to and from the township. Neighbouring Royton had begun to encroach upon southern boundary, forming a continuous urban cotton-spinning district with Oldham.

By 1871 Oldham had more spindles than any country in the world except the United States, and in 1909, was spinning more cotton than France and Germany combined. The demand for cheap cotton goods from this area prompted the flotation of cotton spinning companies; the investment was followed by the construction of 12 new cotton mills from 1870 and 1900. Hawk mill was built in 1909.

By 1911 there were 16.4 million spindles in Oldham, compared with a total of 58 million in the United Kingdom and 143.5 million in the world; in 1928, with the construction of the UK's largest textile factory Oldham reached its manufacturing zenith. At its peak, there were over 360 mills, operating night and day;

In the post-war economic boom of 1919–20, investors did not have the time to build new mills and so were prepared to pay vastly inflated sums for shares in existing companies. Many mills were refloated at valuations of up to £500,000 (£22,320,000 as of 2025), or five times what they had cost to build before the war, resulting in the town being nicknamed "The Golden City" as the scramble for shares intensified. Because of this highly profitable share dealing, it was reported in the national press that Shaw and Crompton had more millionaires per capita than any other town in the world. The number of cotton mills in the township peaked at 36 in 1920. The industry peaked in 1912 when it produced 8 billion yards of cloth. The great war of 1914–1918 halted the supply of raw cotton, and the British government encouraged its colonies to build mills to spin and weave cotton. The war over, Lancashire never regained its markets. The independent mills were struggling. The Bank of England set up the Lancashire Cotton Corporation in 1929 to attempt to rationalise and save the industry. Hawk Mill, Shaw was bought by LCC for &42,800, on 21 April 1931 (Oldham Chronicle), being one of 104 such mills, and one of the 53 mills that survived through to 1950. The mill was closed by Courtaulds in 1967.

== Architecture ==
Designed by A. Turner in 1909. This was a five-storey mill.

=== Power ===
Driven by 1700 hp cross compound engine by Yates & Thom built 1909. It had a 24 ft flywheel with 40 ropes operating at 71 ½ rpm. The 30"HP, 61"LP cylinders had a 4 ft 6" stroke. It was steamed at 180psi The air pump was driven from the crosshead. No tail rods. Trunk guides and a Lumb governor. Yates & Thom preferred a trunk-type frame which together with the valve gear and flat tail rod slides, were characteristic of the makers' design. All was scrapped about 1964.

=== Equipment ===
It had 102280 mule spindles, producing 130000 lbs a week.

=== Owners ===
- Lancashire Cotton Corporation (1930's–1964)
- Courtaulds (1964– )

== See also ==
- Textile manufacturing

== Bibliography ==
- Dunkerley, Philip (2009). "Dunkerley-Tuson Family Website, The Regent Cotton Mill, Failsworth". Archived from the original on 23 March 2008.
- LCC (1951). The mills and organisation of the Lancashire Cotton Corporation Limited. Blackfriars House, Manchester: Lancashire Cotton Corporation Limited.
- Roberts, A S (1921), "Arthur Robert's Engine List", Arthur Roberts Black Book, One guy from Barlick-Book Transcription, archived from the original on 23 July 2011
- Allen, George (1985) [1907], Shaw Church in By-gone Days, York: Coultas & Volans
- Aspin, Chris (1981), The Cotton Industry, Shire, ISBN 0-85263-545-1
- Ballard, Elsie (1986) [1967], A Chronicle of Crompton (2nd ed.), Royton: Burnage Press
- Gurr, Duncan; Hunt, Julian (1998), The Cotton Mills of Oldham, Oldham Education & Leisure, ISBN 0-902809-46-6
- Hunt, Julian; Stott, Frances (1988), Looking Back at Crompton, Oldham Education & Leisure, ISBN 0-902809-17-2
- Stott, Frances (1996), The Changing Face of Crompton, Oldham Education & Leisure, ISBN 0-902809-38-5
- Sellers, Gladys (1991), Walking the South Pennines, Cicerone Press, ISBN 978-1-85284-041-9
