= Heron Mill, Hollinwood =

Cotton spinning mill in Oldham, Greater Manchester, England

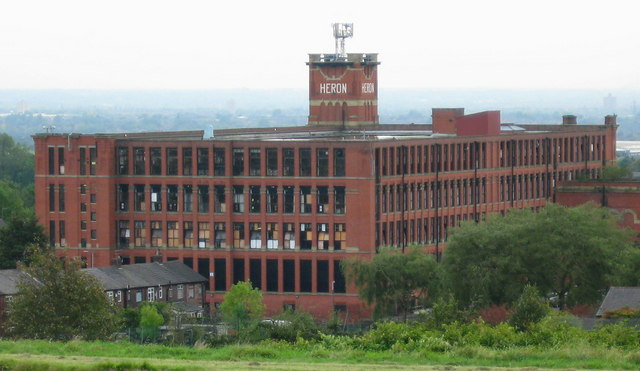

- Location in Greater Manchester

Spinning (ring mill)
- Location: Hollinwood, Oldham, Greater Manchester, England
- Serving canal: Rochdale Canal Hollinwood Branch Canal
- Serving railway: Oldham Loop Line
- Owner: Heron Mill Co
- Further ownership: Lancashire Cotton Corporation (1930s); Courtaulds (1964); Andrew Design Procurement (1973)
- Coordinates: 53.5242°N 2.1268°W

Construction
- Completed: 1905

Design team
- Architect: P. S. Stott

Power
- Date: 1902
- Engine maker: George Saxon & Co
- Engine type: vertical cross compound engine
- Cylinder diameter and throw: 26" HP,50" LP X 4 ft stroke.
- rpm: 80 rpm
- Installed horse power (ihp): 1400 hp
- Flywheel diameter: 16
- No. of ropes: 32

Boiler configuration
- Pressure: 180 psi

Equipment
- Manufacturer: Asa Lees

Heron Mill is a cotton spinning mill in Hollinwood, Oldham, Greater Manchester. It was designed by architect P. S. Stott and was constructed in 1905 by the Heron Mill Company Ltd next to Durban Mill. It was taken over by the Lancashire Cotton Corporation in the 1930s and passed to Courtaulds in 1964. Production ended in 1960, and it was used by Courtaulds for offices, warehousing, and some experimental fabric manufacture. Courtaulds occupation ended in 1994 with the Andrew Design Procurement further holding the site until 1998.

== Location ==
Oldham is a large town in Greater Manchester, England. It lies amongst the Pennines on elevated ground between the rivers Irk and Medlock, 5.3 miles (8.5 km) south-southeast of Rochdale, and 6.9 miles (11.1 km) northeast of the city of Manchester. Oldham is surrounded by several smaller settlements which together form the Metropolitan Borough of Oldham; Chadderton and Hollinwood are such settlements. Chadderton and Hollinwood are served by the Rochdale Canal and the Hollinwood Branch Canal. A rail service was provided by the Oldham Loop Line that was built by the Lancashire and Yorkshire Railway.

== History ==
Heron Mill in 1951

Oldham rose to prominence during the 19th century as an international centre of textile manufacture. It was a boomtown of the Industrial Revolution, and amongst the first ever industrialised towns, rapidly becoming "one of the most important centres of cotton and textile industries in England", spinning Oldham counts, the coarser counts of cotton. Oldham's soils were unfavorable for crop growing, and so for decades prior to industrialisation the area was used for grazing sheep, which provided the raw material for a local woollen weaving trade. It was not until the last quarter of the 18th century that Oldham changed from being a cottage industry township, producing woollen garments via domestic manual labour, to a sprawling industrial metropolis of textile factories. The first mill, Lees Hall, was built by William Clegg in about 1778. Within a year, 11 other mills had been constructed, but by 1818 there were only 19 of these privately owned mills.

In the second half of the 19th century Oldham became a world centre for spinning cotton yarn. This was due in a large part to the formation of limited liability companies known as Oldham Limiteds. In 1851, over 30% of Oldham's population were employed in the textile sector, compared to 5% across Great Britain. At its zenith it was the most productive cotton spinning mill town in the world. By 1871 Oldham had more spindles than any country in the world except the United States, and in 1909, was spinning more cotton than France and Germany combined. By 1911 there were 16.4 million spindles in Oldham, compared with a total of 58 million in the United Kingdom and 143.5 million in the world; in 1928, with the construction of the UK's largest textile factory Oldham reached its manufacturing zenith. At its peak, there were over 360 mills, operating night and day.

The cotton industry peaked in 1912 when it produced 8 billion yards of cloth. The Great War of 1914–18 halted the supply of raw cotton, and the British government encouraged its colonies to build mills to spin and weave cotton. The war over, Lancashire never regained its markets. The independent mills were struggling. The Bank of England set up the Lancashire Cotton Corporation in 1929 to attempt to rationalise and save the industry. Heron Mill, Hollinwood was one of 104 mills bought by the LCC, and one of the 53 mills that survived through to 1950.

== Architecture ==
The 5-storey mill was built in a group with Durban Mill and the earlier Brook Mill. It was designed by P.S.Stott. It was extended in 1977. In 1951 it still displayed the decorative features typical of a P. S. Stott mill including the double bands on the mill chimney.

== Power ==
The mill's machines were driven by a 1400 hp vertical cross compound engine, built by George Saxon & Co in 1902. It had a 16 ft flywheel with 32 ropes which operated at 80 rpm. The cylinders 26" HP, 50" LP had a 4 ft stroke. There were Corliss valves on both cylinders. Air pumps were driven from LP crosshead.

== Equipment ==
This was a mule mill with 105,000 spindles in 1915, supplied by Asa Lees.

== Usage ==
It is now used as a warehouse.

Heron Mill is used as a warehouse facility for Ultimate Products, a brand house selling household products under well-known brand names including Kleeneze, Beldray and Salter.

== Cultural references ==
- The mill is referenced in North American singer-songwriter, Ryan Adams' song, "Manchester", which was released on the Album Big Colors in June 2021.

== Owners ==
- Heron Mill Company (1919
- Lancashire Cotton Corporation (1930s–1964)
- Courtaulds (1964–Present)
- Andrew Design Procurement (1973-1975)

== See also ==
- Textile manufacturing

== Bibliography ==
- Dunkerley, Philip (2009). "Dunkerley-Tuson Family Website, The Regent Cotton Mill, Failsworth". Archived from the original on 23 March 2008.
- LCC (1951). The mills and organisation of the Lancashire Cotton Corporation Limited. Blackfriars House, Manchester: Lancashire Cotton Corporation Limited.
- Gurr, Duncan; Hunt, Julian (1998), The Cotton Mills of Oldham, Oldham Education & Leisure, ISBN 0-902809-46-6, archived from the original on 18 July 2011
- Roberts, A S (1921), "Arthur Robert's Engine List", Arthur Roberts Black Book., One guy from Barlick-Book Transcription, archived from the original on 23 July 2011
