= Saxon Mill, Droylsden =

Cotton mill in Greater Manchester, England

Saxon Mill
- The mill before 1951

- Location in Greater Manchester

Spinning (ring mill)
- Location: Droylsden, Tameside, Greater Manchester, England
- Serving canal: Hollinwood Branch Canal
- Serving railway: Lancashire and Yorkshire Railway
- Owner: Saxon Mill Co. Ltd
- Further ownership: Lancashire Cotton Corporation (1930s); Courtaulds (1964)
- Coordinates: 53.4853°N 2.1443°W

Construction
- Completed: 1906
- Employees: 250
- Demolished: 1995

Power
- Date: 1907
- Engine maker: Daniel Adamson, George Saxon
- Engine type: cross compound
- Valve Gear: Corliss valves
- Cylinder diameter and throw: 27"HP, 56"LP X 5ft stroke
- rpm: 65 ½ rpm
- Installed horse power (ihp): 1500hp
- Flywheel diameter: 24ft
- Transmission type: rope
- No. of ropes: 36

Boiler configuration
- Boilers: Twin Lancashire, coal fired
- Pressure: 160psi

Equipment
- Ring Frames path: 82,000 (1920)

Saxon Mill, Droylsden was a cotton spinning mill in Droylsden, Tameside, Greater Manchester, England. It was built in the 1907, taken over by the Lancashire Cotton Corporation in the 1930s and passed to Courtaulds in 1964. Production finished in 1967, and the mill was demolished in 1995.

== Location ==
Droylsden is a town within the Metropolitan Borough of Tameside, in Greater Manchester, England. It is 4.1 miles (6.6 km) to the east of Manchester city centre, and 2.2 miles (3.5 km) west-southwest of Ashton-under-Lyne. Historically a part of Lancashire, Droylsden grew as a mill town around the cotton mills established in the mid-19th century, and the Ashton and Peak Forest canals. Saxon Mill was built on Medlock Street, adjacent to the Hollinwood Branch Canal in 1906.

== History ==
Saxon mill was built in 1906, for the Saxon Mill Co. Ltd, a company formed by the Ashton Syndicate who were responsible for Minerva Mill, Ashton-under-Lyne etc. In 1908 it had 80,000 spindles which rose to 82,000 in 1920, when it was recapitalised. The industry had peaked in 1912 when it produced 8 billion yards of cloth. The Great War of 1914–18 had halted the supply of raw cotton, and the British government encouraged its colonies to build mills to spin and weave cotton. The war over, Lancashire never regained its markets. The independent mills were struggling. The Bank of England set up the Lancashire Cotton Corporation in 1929 to attempt to rationalise and save the industry. Saxon Mill, Droylsden was one of 104 mills bought by the LCC, and one of the 53 mills that survived through to 1950. It was switched to rayon production. In 1953 it employed 250 people. It was the last mill in the country to produce cop weft. Saxon Mill was closed by Courtaulds in 1967.

== Architecture ==
This was a large four-storey building on a low basement, 18 bays long and 14 bays wide, built of Accrington brick with some yellow sandstone detailing. The shallow buttresses between the windows were embellished at third-floor level. It had a flat roof, tanked to collect water to supplement the water tower. The top three floors were used for spinning frames, the ground floor for preparation machines, and the basement to condition the cotton. The mill was constructed as a grid of cast iron I-beams. The transverse beams were supported on cast iron columns, supporting the longitudinal beams that in turn supported shallow brick vaults. They ran the entire length of the mill, making a fireproof ceiling and floor.

=== Power ===
It was driven by a 1500 hp cross compound engine by Daniel Adamson built in 1907. It had a 24-foot flywheel with 36 ropes, which operated at 65 ½ rpm. New Cylinders by George Saxon, were fitted in 1915. Its cylinders, 27"HP, 56"LP, had a 5-foot stroke. It was steamed at 160psi. Corliss valves were used on both cylinders. It had a Whitehead governor. The air pump was driven from the LP tail rod, which had a single support guide. Steam was provided by two Lancashire boilers 9.2 metres by 2.4 metres in diameter. Water was preheated by an economiser. The engine was scrapped in 1967.

== Usage ==
=== Owners ===
- Saxon Mill Co Ltd
- Lancashire Cotton Corporation (1930s–1964)
- Courtaulds (1964–
- Priory Furniture Ltd

== Notable events/media ==
In the mid-1920s the flywheel became detached from its bearings and rolled at great speed out of the engine house and across the road, demolishing two houses as it went.

== See also ==
- Textile manufacturing

== Bibliography ==
- Dunkerley, Philip (2009). "Dunkerley-Tuson Family Website, The Regent Cotton Mill, Failsworth". Archived from the original on 23 March 2008.
- LCC (1951). The mills and organisation of the Lancashire Cotton Corporation Limited. Blackfriars House, Manchester: Lancashire Cotton Corporation Limited.
- Roberts, A S (1921), "Arthur Robert's Engine List", Arthur Roberts Black Book., One guy from Barlick-Book Transcription, archived from the original on 23 July 2011
- UMAU (1995). "Archaeological Report on Saxon mill before its demolition".
