= Arkwright Mill, Rochdale =

Cotton mill in Greater Manchester, England

- The bill before 1951

- Location in Greater Manchester

Spinning (ring and doubling mill)
- Location: Rochdale, Greater Manchester, England
- Serving canal: Rochdale Canal
- Serving railway: Manchester and Leeds Railway
- Further ownership: Lancashire Cotton Corporation (1930s); Courtaulds (1964)
- Coordinates: 53.6257°N 2.1388°W

Construction
- Completed: 1885
- Demolished: 2007

Equipment
- Date: 1885
- Manufacturer: Howard & Bullough
- Cotton count: Average to 16s
- Mule Frames: 49,000 spindles (1891)
- Ring Frames path: 26,000 spindles (1891)

Arkwright Mill, Rochdale was a cotton spinning mill in Rochdale, Greater Manchester, England. It was built in 1885 by the Arkwright Cotton Spinning Co. It was taken over by the Lancashire Cotton Corporation in the 1930s and passed to Courtaulds in 1964. It was located next to Dale Mill on Roch Street. The ring and doubling frames were made by Howard & Bullough, Accrington. The mill closed in 1980, was demolished in 2007 and the land redeveloped for housing.

== Location ==
Rochdale is a large market town in Greater Manchester, England. It lies amongst the foothills of the Pennines on the River Roch, 5.3 miles (8.5 km) north-northwest of Oldham, and 9.8 miles (15.8 km) north-northeast of the city of Manchester. Rochdale is surrounded by several smaller settlements which together form the Metropolitan Borough of Rochdale. Rochdale is served by the Rochdale Canal. A rail service was provided by Manchester and Leeds Railway from 1839. It was amalgamated into the Lancashire and Yorkshire Railway in 1847, and lines ran to Bury, Burnley, Oldham, Manchester and Leeds. Arkwright Mill was built in Wardleworth on flat land adjacent to Dale Mill and the River Roch, 1 mile (1.6 km) northeast of the town head.

== History ==
Rochdale rose to prominence during the 19th century as a major mill town and centre for textile manufacture during the Industrial Revolution. It was a boomtown of the Industrial Revolution, and amongst the first ever industrialised towns. The Rochdale Canal—one of the major navigable broad canals of the United Kingdom, which opened between 1798 and 1804—was a highway of commerce during this time. It was used for the haulage of cotton, wool and coal to and from the area. Rochdale's early industry was the production of woollen flannel, and the cotton industry grew up alongside it. Water-powered cotton spinning mills were built on the Roch in the 1780s and 1790s, but as late as 1818 there were only seven cotton mills in Rochdale itself. By the 1840s, however, cotton had overtaken wool in importance, although the wool industry enjoyed a resurgence during the Lancashire Cotton Famine of the 1860s.

In 1882 Rochdale the home of industrial co-operatives, embraced the joint stock limited company and new mills were financed and built. Its ownership model was slightly different from that of Oldham, and more shares remained in the hands of the operatives. The Rochdale Limiteds were some of the first to adopt ring spinning.

Arkwright Mill was built in 1885 by the Arkwright Cotton Spinning Co and used both ring frames and spinning mules.

The industry peaked in 1912 when it produced 8 billion yards of cloth. World War I halted the supply of raw cotton, and the British government encouraged its colonies to build mills to spin and weave cotton. The war over, Lancashire never regained its markets. The independent mills were struggling. The Bank of England set up the Lancashire Cotton Corporation in 1929 to attempt to rationalise and save the industry. Arkwright Mill, Rochdale was one of 104 mills bought by the LCC, and one of the 53 mills that survived through to 1950.

The mill was closed by Courtaulds in 1980.

=== Equipment ===
The mule frames and ring frames were provided by Howard & Bullough, and initially there were 49,000 mule spindles and 26,000 ring spindles, spinning 16s. They had 300/408 mule twist, 208/368 ring twist, 228/428 weft.

== Owners ==
- Arkwright Cotton Spinning Co (1885)
- Lancashire Cotton Corporation (1930s–1964)
- Courtaulds (1964–1980)

== Bibliography ==
- Dunkerley, Philip (2009). "Dunkerley-Tuson Family Website, The Regent Cotton Mill, Failsworth". Archived from the original on 12 February 2009.
- LCC (1951). The mills and organisation of the Lancashire Cotton Corporation Limited. Blackfriars House, Manchester: Lancashire Cotton Corporation Limited.
- Williams, Mike; Farnie, Douglas Anthony (1992). Cotton Mills of Greater Manchester. Carnegie Publishing. ISBN 0-948789-69-7.
