= Century Mill, Farnworth =

Cotton spinning mill in Bolton, Greater Manchester, England

Century Mill
- The mill before 1951

- Location in Greater Manchester

Spinning (ring mill)
- Location: Farnworth, Bolton, Lancashire, England
- Owner: Century Ring Spinning Company
- Further ownership: Lancashire Cotton Corporation (1937); Courtaulds (1964)
- Coordinates: 53.5454°N 2.4112°W

Power
- Date: 1902
- Engine maker: Hick Hargraves & Co. Ltd.
- Engine type: Cross compound
- Valve Gear: Corliss
- rpm: 59
- Installed horse power (ihp): 1500
- Flywheel diameter: 27ft
- No. of ropes: 45

Boiler configuration
- Pressure: 190

Equipment
- Ring Frames path: 40's counts

Century Mill, Farnworth is a former cotton spinning mill in Farnworth, Bolton, Greater Manchester, England which was built in 1902 for the Century Ring Spinning Company. It was taken over by the Lancashire Cotton Corporation in 1937 and passed to Courtaulds in 1964. The 6,674.00-square-metre (71,838.3 sq ft) building is still in use for various other purposes in 2016.

== History ==
Century mill was built early in the 20th century, spinning 40's counts on ring frames for general-purpose work.

The cotton industry peaked in 1912 when it produced 8 billion yards of cloth. The Great War of 1914–1918 halted the supply of raw cotton, and the British government encouraged its colonies to build mills to spin and weave cotton. The war over, Lancashire never regained its markets and the independent mills were struggling. The Bank of England set up the Lancashire Cotton Corporation in 1929 to attempt to rationalise and save the industry. Century Mill, Farnworth was one of 104 mills bought by the LCC, and one of the 53 mills that survived through to 1950. In 2016 it was still standing and in use for non-textile purposes. Century Mill was under demolition during 2023 and 2024 to make way for a new housing estate. By October 2024 the landmark chimney was the only part of the mill remaining, however this was finally demolished by November 2024.

== Architecture ==
=== Power ===
The mill had a 1500 hp cross compound engine by Hick, Hargreaves & Co. Ltd. built in 1902 which operated at 190psi. The cylinders were 26"HP, 54"LP on a 5 ft (1.5 m) stroke. The 27 ft (8.2 m) flywheel drove 45 ropes at 59rpm.

=== Equipment ===
- Ring frames

=== Owners ===
- Century Ring Spinning Company (1902-1931)
- Cotton Spindles Board (c.1931-1937)
- Lancashire Cotton Corporation (1937–1964)
- Courtaulds (1964–

== See also ==
- Textile manufacturing

== Bibliography ==
- Dunkerley, Philip (2009). "Dunkerley-Tuson Family Website, The Regent Cotton Mill, Failsworth". Archived from the original on 23 March 2008.
- LCC (1951). The mills and organisation of the Lancashire Cotton Corporation Limited. Blackfriars House, Manchester: Lancashire Cotton Corporation Limited.
- Roberts, A S (1921), "Arthur Robert's Engine List", Arthur Roberts Black Book., One guy from Barlick-Book Transcription, archived from the original on 23 July 2011
