= Mons Mill, Todmorden =

Cotton mill in West Yorkshire, England

- The mill before 1951

- Location in West Yorkshire

Spinning (ring mill)
- Location: Todmorden, Calderdale, West Yorkshire, England
- Serving canal: Rochdale Canal
- Serving railway: Manchester and Leeds Railway
- Further ownership: Lancashire Cotton Corporation (1930); Courtaulds (1964)
- Coordinates: 53.7215°N 2.1067°W

Construction
- Completed: 1907
- Demolished: 1986-2000

Design team
- Architect: Abraham Stott

Power
- Engine maker: Carel Frères of Belgium
- Engine type: Cross Compound
- Transmission type: ropes
- No. of ropes: 73

Mons Mill, Todmorden, is a former cotton spinning mill in Todmorden, Calderdale, West Yorkshire, England built for the Hare Spinning Company Limited. It was built in 1907, but ran into financial difficulties. It passed over to the Mons Mill (1919) Co Ltd and then was taken over by the Lancashire Cotton Corporation in 1930 and passed to Courtaulds in 1964 and production stopped in 1968. It was used into the 1990s by Ward & Goldstone Ltd. The site was cleared in 2000.

== Location ==
Todmorden is a market town and civil parish, within the Metropolitan Borough of Calderdale, in West Yorkshire, England. It forms part of the Upper Calder Valley and has a total population of 14,941. It is 30 kilometres (19 mi) north north east of Manchester, 18 kilometres (11 mi) west of Halifax and 14 kilometres (8.7 mi) south east of Burnley.

Todmorden town centre occupies the confluence of three steep-sided valleys in the Pennines. The valleys constrict the shape of the town. Todmorden is surrounded by moorlands with occasional outcrops of gritstone sandblasted by winds.

The historic county boundary between Yorkshire and Lancashire was marked by the River Calder and its tributary the Walsden Water, which runs through the centre of the town. The historic border remains but the administrative border was altered by the Local Government Act 1888, whereby today all of Todmorden lies within West Yorkshire. The town is served by Todmorden railway station and Walsden railway station.

== History ==
For hundreds of years streams from the surrounding hills provided water for corn and fulling mills. Todmorden grew to relative prosperity by combining farming with the production of woollen textiles. Some Yeomen clothiers were able to build fine houses, a few of which still exist today. Increasingly, though, the area turned to cotton. The proximity of Manchester as a source of material and trade was undoubtedly a strong factor. Another was that the strong Pennine streams and rivers were able to power the machine looms. Improvements in textile machinery (by Kay, Hargreaves and Arkwright), along with the development of turnpike roads (1751–81) helped to develop the new cotton industry and increase the local population.

During the years 1800–45 great changes took place in the communications and transport of the town which were to have a crucial effect on promoting industrial growth. These included the building of: (1) better roads; (2) the Rochdale Canal (1804); and (3) the main line of the Manchester and Leeds Railway (1841), which became the Lancashire and Yorkshire Railway in 1847. This railway line incorporated the (then) longest tunnel in the world, the 2,885 yard Summit Tunnel. A second railway, from Todmorden to Burnley, opened as a single line in 1849, being doubled to meet demand in 1860. A short connecting line, from Stansfield Hall to Hall Royd, completed the "Todmorden Triangle" in 1862, thus enabling trains to travel in all three directions (Manchester, Leeds and Burnley) without reversing.

The Industrial Revolution caused a concentration of industry and settlement along the valley floor and a switch from woollens to cotton. One family in the area was particularly influential on the town: the Fielden family. They created a "dynasty" that changed the town forever by establishing several large mills, putting up assorted impressive buildings and bringing about social and educational change.

Hare Mill was built in 1907; the first sod was cut on 1 June 1907. It had cost £218,285 to build, and there were financial and boardroom problems and the mill finally opened in August 1912. A second identical mill was proposed, but never built. There was the logo of a white hare on the mill chimney. The company was wound up in 1914. The mill was bought by William Hopwood for £131,450. He sold it to the newly formed Mons Mill Company Limited and the mill was renamed Mons Mill (after the Battle of Mons). There was a later company Mons Mill (1919) Limited, which took over the mill in 1919.

The industry peaked in 1912 when it produced 8 billion yards of cloth. The Great War of 1914–18 halted the supply of raw cotton, and the British government encouraged its colonies to build mills to spin and weave cotton. The war over, Lancashire never regained its markets. The independent mills were struggling. The Bank of England set up the Lancashire Cotton Corporation in 1929 to attempt to rationalise and save the industry. Mons Mill, Todmorden was one of 104 mills bought by the LCC, and one of the 53 mills that survived beyond 1950. In 1974, the LCC was taken over by Courtaulds. In 1968, the mill closed. From 1971, the building was used by Ward & Goldstone Limited until the 1990s when they left.

In the 1970s, the mill chimney was reduced by 30 ft (9.1 m). In 1986, the mill chimney and the engine house were demolished. The site was cleared in March 2000.

== Architecture ==
Seven-storied steam-powered cotton-spinning mill built for the Hare Spinning Company Limited. It was constructed of red Accrington brick, designed by Abraham Stott. Stott's design utilised rolled steel columns and reinforced concrete, and was unpopular when it was first proposed. There was the logo of a white hare on the mill chimney.

=== Power ===
The mill was originally powered by an engine built by Carels of Belgium which drove about 73 belts.

=== Owners ===
- Hare Mill Co (1907–14)
- William Hopwood (1914)
- Mons Mill Co Ltd (1914–1919)
- Mons Mill (1919) Co Ltd (1919–1930)
- Lancashire Cotton Corporation (1930–1964)
- Courtaulds (1964–68)
- Ward & Goldstone Ltd (1971–1990s)

== See also ==
- Textile manufacturing

== Bibliography ==
- Dunkerley, Philip (2009). "Dunkerley-Tuson Family Website, The Regent Cotton Mill, Failsworth". Archived from the original on 23 March 2008.
- LCC (1951). The mills and organisation of the Lancashire Cotton Corporation Limited. Blackfriars House, Manchester: Lancashire Cotton Corporation Limited.
- Bull, Malcolm (2010). "Calderdale Companion". Archived from the original on 13 February 2009.
- Roberts, A S (1921), "Arthur Robert's Engine List", Arthur Roberts Black Book., One guy from Barlick-Book Transcription, archived from the original on 23 July 2011
