= Bolton Union Mill, Bolton =

Cotton mill in Bolton, Greater Manchester, England

Bolton Union Mill
- The mill before 1951

- Location in Greater Manchester

Spinning (ring mill)
- Location: Halliwell, Bolton, Greater Manchester
- Further ownership: Lancashire Cotton Corporation (1930s); Courtaulds (1964)
- Coordinates: 53.5834°N 2.4375°W

Construction
- Floor area: 15,466.00

Power
- Engine maker: John Musgrave & Sons
- Engine type: tandem compound engine
- Valve Gear: Corliss valves
- Cylinder diameter and throw: 28"HP, 52"LP X 6ft stroke
- rpm: 50
- Installed horse power (ihp): 1200hp
- Flywheel diameter: 32ft
- No. of ropes: 28

Equipment
- Mule Frames: 40's-50's counts
- Ring Frames path: 40's counts

Bolton Union Mill was a cotton spinning mill in Halliwell, Bolton, Greater Manchester. It was built in 1875 and 1880. It was taken over by the Lancashire Cotton Corporation in the 1930s and brought back into production. Subsequently, it passed to Tootals and Dewhurst Dent in 1964. Production finished in 1967.

The building is still standing. It has 15,466 m^{2} (166,470 sq ft) of floor space and was driven by a 1200 hp tandem compound J Musgrave engine with a 32 ft (9.8 m) flywheel with 28 ropes operated at 50rpm.

== History ==
Bolton was a mill town; textiles have been produced in Bolton since Flemish weavers settled in the area during the 15th century, developing a wool and cotton weaving tradition. The urbanisation and development of Bolton largely coincided with the introduction of textile manufacture during the Industrial Revolution. It was a boomtown of the 19th century and at its zenith, in 1929, its 216 cotton mills and 26 bleaching and dying works made it one of the largest and most productive centres of cotton spinning in the world.

No. 1 Mill Built was built in 1875, and No2 Mill was built in 1880. a further site was operated from 1884 by John Hebden and Son, Vernon Mills. The Bolton Union Spinning Company Co Ltd was constituted in 1874 and was operating the mills in 1900. Mill No3 was built in 1902–1905. It is not recorded when production stopped.

The industry peaked in 1912 when it produced 8 billion yards of cloth. The Great War of 1914–18 halted the supply of raw cotton, and the British government encouraged its colonies to build mills to spin and weave cotton. The war over, Lancashire never regained its markets. The independent mills were struggling. The Bank of England set up the Lancashire Cotton Corporation in 1929 to attempt to rationalise and save the industry. Bolton Union Mill, Bolton was one of 104 mills bought by the LCC, and one of the 53 mills that survived through to 1950.

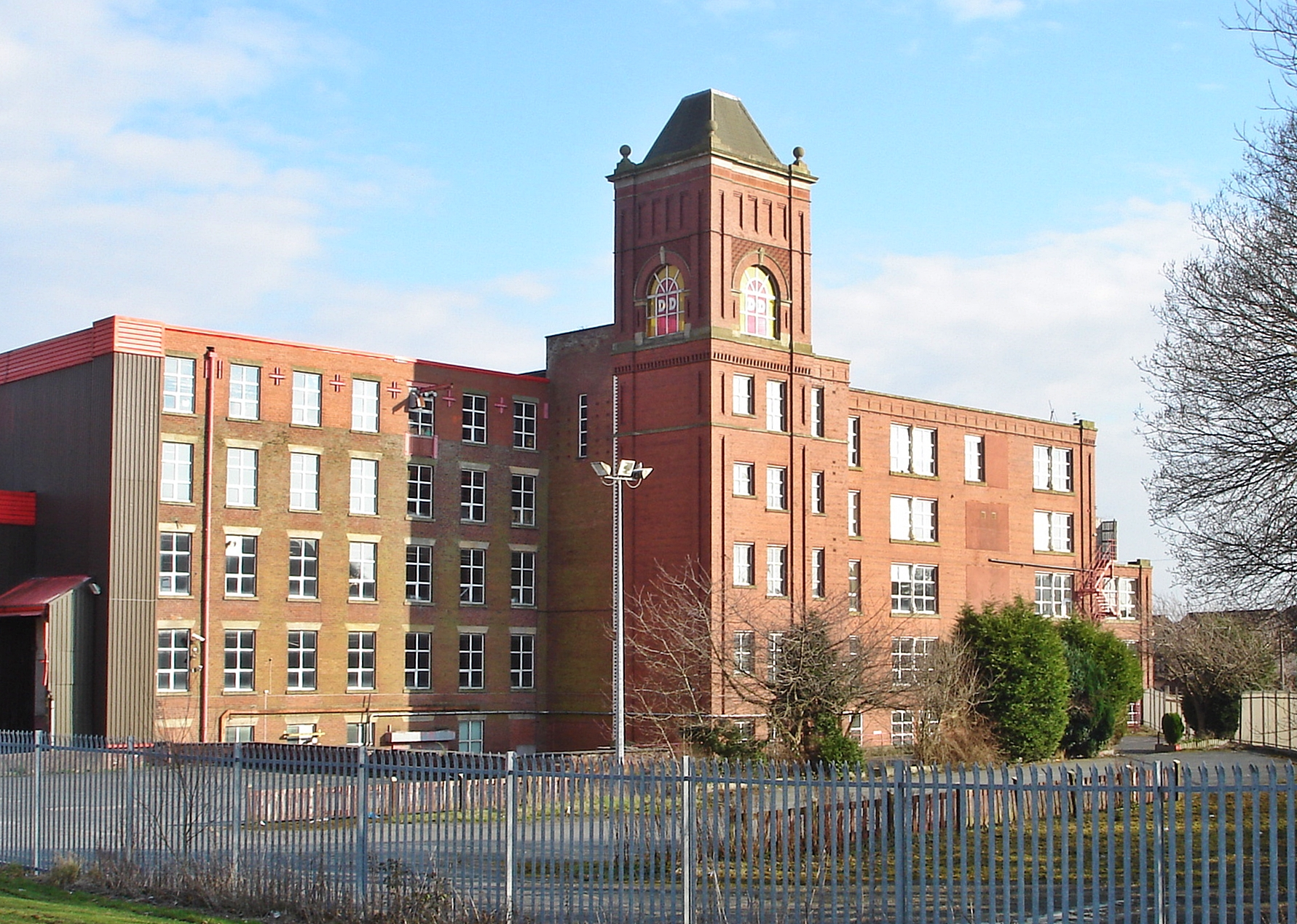
Bolton Union Mill in 2016

LCC received permission to re-open the mills in 1946 but in 1961 the mills were bought by Barlow & Jones and Mill No. 1 demolished. In 1976 the other mills were closed by Tootals Ltd. In 1985 No. 1 Mill site was landscaped for use as playing fields and No2 Mill was used by Dewhurst Dent Holdings Ltd, G & R Dewhurst (CMT) Curtains Ltd, Dewhurst Printing Company.

The mill was to be demolished (2008) and replaced with apartments, because the council sees the mill as no longer reflecting the image of the surrounding area. In 2016, it was still standing and in use.

== Architecture ==
=== Power ===
Driven by 1200 hp tandem compound engine by John Musgrave & Sons, operating at 100psi. It had a 32-foot flywheel with 28 ropes, operated at 50rpm. The cylinders, 28"HP, 52"LP had a 6-foot stroke. The air pump was driven from the crosshead.

== Owners ==
- John Hebden and Son, Vernon Mills
- The Bolton Union Spinning Company Co Ltd
- Lancashire Cotton Corporation (1930s-1964)
- Tootals
- Dewhurst Dent

== See also ==
- List of mills in Bolton
- Textile manufacturing

== Bibliography ==
- Dunkerley, Philip (2009). "Dunkerley-Tuson Family Website, The Regent Cotton Mill, Failsworth". Archived from the original on 12 February 2009.
- LCC (1951). The mills and organisation of the Lancashire Cotton Corporation Limited. Blackfriars House, Manchester: Lancashire Cotton Corporation Limited.
- Roberts, A S (1921), "Arthur Robert's Engine List", Arthur Roberts Black Book., One guy from Barlick-Book Transcription, archived from the original on 23 July 2011
