= Foxsons Mill, Staincliffe =

Cotton mill in West Yorkshire, England

Fox Mill
- The mill before 1951

- Location in West Yorkshire

Doubling mill
- Location: Staincliffe, Dewsbury, West Yorkshire, England
- Further ownership: Lancashire Cotton Corporation (1930s); Courtaulds (1964)
- Coordinates: 53.7043°N 1.6489°W

Construction
- Demolished: 1973

Design team
- Architect: F. W. Dixon

Foxsons Mill, Staincliffe was a doubling mill in Dewsbury, West Yorkshire. It was Lancashire Cotton Corporation sole mill in West Yorkshire. A doubling mill, it doubled yarns of counts 4's to 40's. built in It was taken over by the Lancashire Cotton Corporation in the 1930s and passed to Courtaulds in 1964. The mill was demolished in 1973, and the land is now housing.

== Location ==
Staincliffe is part of the West Yorkshire Urban Area, 2.4 km (1.5 mi) north of Dewsbury which is in the Calder valley. It is situated between a number of larger towns and cities. Halifax is 13 km (8.1 mi) upstream to the west, Leeds and Bradford lie 13 km (8.1 mi) to the north, Huddersfield lies 13 km (8.1 mi) to the south west, and Wakefield some 10 km (6.2 mi) east.

Geologically, the town is situated on rock dated to the Carboniferous Period, consisting of coal measures and gritstones. Quaternary Period rock, glacial deposits and gravels exist in the Calder Valley. Coal, stone and gravel have all been exploited commercially.

Foxson's mill was on the Halifax road out of Staincliffe.

== History ==
The industry peaked in 1912 when it produced 8 billion yards of cloth. The great war of 1914- 1918 halted the supply of raw cotton, and the British government encouraged its colonies to build mills to spin and weave cotton. The war over, Lancashire never regained its markets. The independent mills were struggling. The Bank of England set up the Lancashire Cotton Corporation in 1929 to attempt to rationalise and save the industry. Foxsons Mill, Staincliffe was one of 104 mills bought by the LCC, and one of the 53 mills that survived through to 1950.

== Architecture ==
This was a F. W. Dixon Mill.

=== Owners ===
- Lancashire Cotton Corporation (1930s–1964)
- Courtaulds (1964–

== See also ==
- Textile manufacturing

== Bibliography ==
- Dunkerley, Philip (2009). "Dunkerley-Tuson Family Website, The Regent Cotton Mill, Failsworth". Archived from the original on 23 March 2008.
- LCC (1951). The mills and organisation of the Lancashire Cotton Corporation Limited. Blackfriars House, Manchester: Lancashire Cotton Corporation Limited.
- Roberts, A S (1921), "Arthur Robert's Engine List", Arthur Roberts Black Book., One guy from Barlick-Book Transcription, archived from the original on 23 July 2011
