= Wilton Mill, Radcliffe =

Cotton mill in Greater Manchester, England

- The mill before 1951

- Location in Greater Manchester

Spinning (ring mill)
- Location: Radcliffe, Bury, Greater Manchester, England
- Owner: Wilton Spinning Co
- Further ownership: Lancashire Cotton Corporation (1930); Courtaulds (1964)
- Coordinates: 53.5614°N 2.3183°W

Power
- Date: 1907
- Engine maker: Galloway
- Engine type: triple-expansion four-cylinder engine
- Valve Gear: Corliss valves
- Cylinder diameter and throw: 23"HP, 36"IP, two 40"LP X 5ft stroke
- rpm: 63
- Installed horse power (ihp): 1500
- Flywheel diameter: 26ft
- Transmission type: rope
- No. of ropes: 37

Wilton Mill, Radcliffe was a cotton spinning mill in Radcliffe, Bury, Greater Manchester. It was built in 1907 and was taken over by the Lancashire Cotton Corporation in 1930 and passed to Courtaulds in 1964. Production finished in 1965, after which it was used by the East Lancashire Paper Company but has now been demolished leaving an empty site next to the railways and the River Irwell.

== Location ==
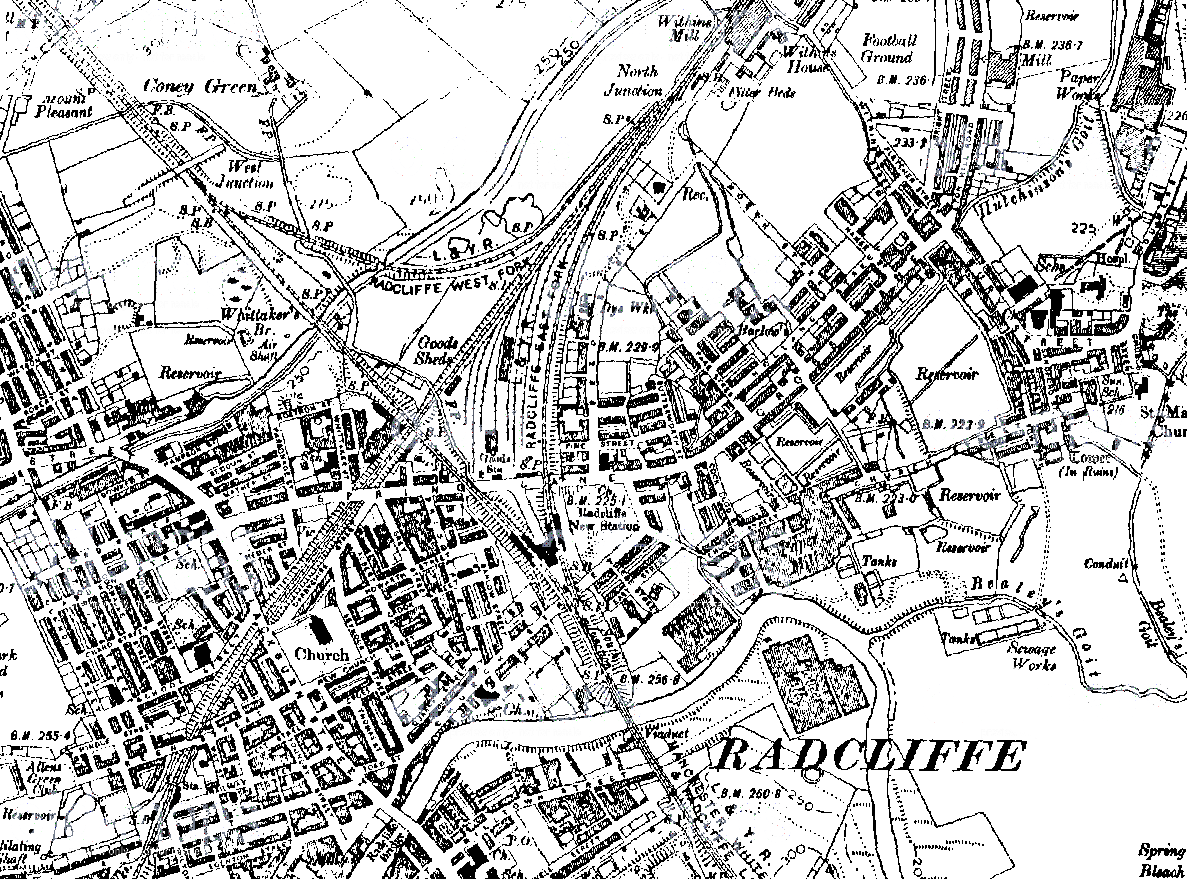
Wilton Mill can be seen north of the river, east of the railway viaduct.

Radcliffe is a town within the Metropolitan Borough of Bury, in Greater Manchester, England. It lies on undulating ground in the Irwell Valley, along the course of the River Irwell, 2.5 miles (4.0 km) south-west of Bury and 6.5 miles (10.5 km) north-northwest of Manchester. Radcliffe is contiguous with the town of Whitefield to the south. The Manchester, Bolton & Bury Canal served and bisected the town. The town had significant rail connections: the opening of the Manchester, Bury and Rossendale Railway (later known as the East Lancashire Railway (ELR)) in 1846 brought the town a direct connection to Manchester and Bury and Liverpool and Bury Railway (L&BR) opened on 28 November 1848, with a station to the north of the town, on 18 July 1872 the Lancashire and Yorkshire Railway (L&YR), which had amalgamated with the ELR some years previously, gained an Act of Parliament to construct a railway between Manchester and Bury, via Whitefield and Prestwich.The underlying coal measures throughout the town were a valuable source of fuel. Radcliffe already had an established textile industry before the arrival of steam power.

Wilton mill was on Rectory Lane, in the centre of the town adjacent to the River Irwell and the railways.

== History ==
Blessed with coal, and good communications, Radcliffe was at one time home to around 60 textile mills and 15 spinning mills, along with 18 bleachworks of which the Bealey family were prominent owners. However, the textile industry was not the town's major employer; other industries such as mining and paper making were also important sources of employment. The Wilton Mill was a late mill, built in 1907. It had four storeys, it was 36x10 bays with a six bay engine house.

The industry peaked in 1912 when it produced 8 billion yards of cloth. The Great War of 1914–1918 halted the supply of raw cotton, and the British government encouraged its colonies to build mills to spin and weave cotton. The war over, Lancashire never regained its markets. The independent mills were struggling. The Bank of England set up the Lancashire Cotton Corporation in 1929 to attempt to rationalise and save the industry. Wilton Mill, Radcliffe was one of 104 mills bought by the LCC, and one of the 53 mills that survived through to 1950. After Cotton it was used by the East Lancashire Paper Company. It was demolished in the early 21st century, its site remains derelict and is clearly visible on satellite images.

== Architecture ==
The Wilton Mill was a late mill. It was built as a mule mill, but was converted by the LCC to rings. It had four storeys, it was 36x10 bays with a six bay engine house. The chimney was detached, round on a square plinth. It had an ornate domed water tower, and its name was displayed on a pediment above the rope race.

=== Power ===
Driven by a 1500 hp triple-expansion four-cylinder engine built by W & J Galloway & Sons, of Manchester in 1908. It had a 26 ft flywheel, 37 ropes operating at 63 rpm. The cylinders, 23"HP, 36"IP, two 40"LP had a 5 ft stroke. With Corliss valves on all cylinders it was steamed at 160psi.

=== Equipment ===
Mules then rings.

== Owners ==
- Wilton Spinning Co (1907-1930)
- Lancashire Cotton Corporation (1930–1964)
- Courtaulds (1964–1965)
- East Lancashire Paper Company

== See also ==
- Textile manufacturing

== Bibliography ==
- Dunkerley, Philip (2009). "Dunkerley-Tuson Family Website, The Regent Cotton Mill, Failsworth". Archived from the original on 23 March 2008.
- LCC (1951). The mills and organisation of the Lancashire Cotton Corporation Limited. Blackfriars House, Manchester: Lancashire Cotton Corporation Limited.
- Roberts, A S (1921), "Arthur Robert's Engine List", Arthur Roberts Black Book., One guy from Barlick-Book Transcription, archived from the original on 23 July 2011
- Sunderland, Frank (1995), The Book of Radcliffe, Bury Library Local Studies: Baron Birch, ISBN 0-86023-561-0
- Wells, Jeffrey (1995), An Illustrated Historical Survey of the Railways in and Around Bury, Challenger Publications, ISBN 1-899624-29-5
- Ashmore, Owen (1982). The industrial archaeology of North-west England. Manchester University Press. ISBN 0-7190-0820-4.
