= Pilot Mill, Bury =

Cotton mill in Greater Manchester, England

- Location in Greater Manchester

Spinning (ring mill)
- Location: Alfred Street, Bury, Greater Manchester, England
- Serving railway: East Lancashire Railway
- Owner: Pilot Spinning Co
- Further ownership: Lancashire Cotton Corporation (1939)
- Coordinates: 53.585°N 2.285°W

Power
- Date: 1906
- Engine maker: J & E Wood
- Engine type: triple-expansion four-cylinder engine
- Cylinder diameter and throw: 23 ½"HP, 36 ½"IP, two 40"LP X 5ft stroke
- rpm: 66 ½ rpm.
- Installed horse power (ihp): 2000 hp
- Flywheel diameter: 24ft
- Transmission type: Ropes
- No. of ropes: 46

Pilot Mill, Bury is a four-storey cotton spinning mill in Bury, Greater Manchester, England. It was built in 1905 for the Pilot Spinning Co. It was taken over by the Lancashire Cotton Corporation in 1939. The mill closed in 1962 and was later sold to Antler Luggage. The Mill is currently occupied by Baum Trading Ltd and Metzuyan Ltd (an online fashion clothing and accessories company)they have opened a retail outlet with an on site cafe.

== Location ==
Bury is a town in Greater Manchester, England. It lies on the River Irwell, 5.5 miles (8.9 km) east of Bolton, 5.9 miles (9.5 km) west-southwest of Rochdale, and 7.9 miles (12.7 km) north-northwest of the city of Manchester. Bury is surrounded by several smaller settlements which together form the Metropolitan Borough of Bury, of which Bury is the largest settlement and administrative centre. Bury has a total population of 60,718. Historically a part of Lancashire, Bury emerged during the Industrial Revolution as a mill town centred on textile manufacture.

Pilot mill is on Alfred Street, close to the centre of the town adjacent to the River Roch and the railway and junction 2 of the M66.

== History ==
Probate evidence from the 17th century and the remains of 18th century weavers' cottages in Elton, on the west side of Bury, indicate that domestic textile production was an important factor of the local economy at a time when Bury's textile industry was dominated by woollens and based upon the domestic production of yarn and cloth as well as water-powered fulling mills. Development was swift in the late 18th and early 19th centuries. The establishment of Brooksbottom Mill, in Summerseat north of the town, as a calico printing works in 1773 by the family of Sir Robert Peel marked the beginning of the cotton industry in Bury. By the early 19th century cotton was the predominant textile industry with the River Roch and River Irwell providing power for spinning mills and processing water for the finishing trades. Development was further promoted when the town was linked to the national canal network by the Manchester, Bolton and Bury Canal, fully opened in 1808. The canal is provided with water from Elton Reservoir, fed by aqueducts from a weir on the River Irwell, north of what is now the Burrs Country Park. The Burrs is also the site of another mill developed by the Peel family, first founded in 1790. The remains are displayed for the public. There were seven cotton mills in Bury by 1818 and the population grew from 9,152 in 1801 to 58,029 in 1901.

Following this, railways opened, linking the town from Bury Bolton Street railway station to Manchester, Radcliffe, Rawtenstall and Accrington and from the old Knowsley Street railway station to the neighbouring mill towns of Bolton, Heywood and Rochdale. As well as the many cotton mills other industries which thrived included paper–making, calico printing and some light engineering. The town expanded to incorporate the former townships of Elton, Walmersley and Heap and rows of terraced housing encircled the town centre by the turn of the 19th century. Districts such as Freetown, Fishpool and Pimhole were transformed from farmers' fields to rows of terraced housing, beside the factories and mills.

Pilot Mill is one of the classic late 19th-century spinning mills that were such a feature of other Lancashire towns.

The industry peaked in 1912 when it produced 8 billion yards of cloth. The Great War of 1914–18 halted the supply of raw cotton, and the British government encouraged its colonies to build mills to spin and weave cotton. The war over, Lancashire never regained its markets. The independent mills were struggling. The Bank of England set up the Lancashire Cotton Corporation in 1929 to attempt to rationalise and save the industry. Pilot Mill, Bury was one of 104 mills bought by the LCC, and one of the 53 mills that survived through to 1950. After cotton, it lost its chimney and the decorative top to the water tower.

As of 2008, the mill and engine house remain, the chimney is gone. The building is occupied by a luggage manufacturer.

== Architecture ==
Pilot Mill was a late mill. It had an ornate pyramidal water tower, and its name was displayed on the western side.

=== Power ===
Driven by 2000 hp triple-expansion four-cylinder engine by J & E Wood, 1906. 23 ½"HP, 36 ½"IP, two 40"LP X 5 ft stroke. 200psi, 66 ½ rpm. 24 ft flywheel, 46 ropes.

== Usage ==
=== Owners ===
- Pilot Spinning Co
- Lancashire Cotton Corporation (1939–1962)
- Occupied by Antler, a luggage manufacturer 2008
- David Weidenbaum and Nandas Varsani

== See also ==
- Textile manufacturing

== Bibliography ==
- Ashmore, Owen (1982), The industrial archaeology of North-west England, Manchester University Press, ISBN 0-7190-0820-4
- Dunkerley, Philip (2009), Dunkerley-Tuson Family Website, The Regent Cotton Mill, Failsworth, archived from the original on 23 March 2008
- LCC (1951), The mills and organisation of the Lancashire Cotton Corporation Limited, Lancashire Cotton Corporation
- Roberts, A. S. (1921), "Arthur Robert's Engine List", Arthur Roberts Black Book, One guy from Barlick-Book Transcription
- McNeil, Robina; Nevell, M. (2000), A guide to the Industrial Archaeology of Greater Manchester, Association for Industrial Archaeology, ISBN 978-0-9528930-3-5
