= Empress Mill, Ince =

Cotton mill in Greater Manchester, England

Empress Mill
- The mill before 1951

- Location in Greater Manchester

Spinning
- Architectural style: Single-storey shed mill
- Location: Ince, Wigan, Greater Manchester, Englane
- Owner: Empress Spinning Co (1920)
- Further ownership: Lancashire Cotton Corporation (1930); Courtaulds (1964)
- Coordinates: 53.5431°N 2.6094°W

Construction
- Completed: 1907

Empress Mill, Ince was a single storey shed mill alongside the Leeds and Liverpool Canal, spinning cotton in Ince, Wigan, Greater Manchester, England. It was acquired by the Lancashire Cotton Corporation in 1930, and passed to Courtaulds in 1964. Production ceased in 1975. It was the last mill in Ince to close, despite the intervention of Member of Parliament Michael McGuire, and a debate in the House of Commons on 20 March 1975.

== Location ==
Ince or Ince-in Makerfield is a former township, and an electoral ward of the Metropolitan Borough of Wigan, in Greater Manchester. It lies on the southeastern bank of the River Douglas, south east and 2 kilometres (1.2 mi) of Wigan's town centre. It is 15 miles (24.1 km) south of Preston, 16.5 miles (26.6 km) west-northwest of Manchester, and 17.4 miles (28 km) east-northeast of Liverpool. Ince was a mining town. The Leeds and Liverpool Canal passes through. Empress mill was built adjacent to the canal, by the seventh lock in the 21-lock Wigan flight completed in 1816. Ince and Wigan lie in a synclinal basin, where the middle coal measures of the Lancashire Coalfield outcrop allowing open cast workings. There was a ready fuel for the mill's steam engines. In the 1830s Wigan became one of the first towns to be served by a railway with connections to Preston and the Manchester and Liverpool Railway.

== History ==
The Empress Mill was a single-storey spinning mill.

The industry peaked in 1912 when it produced 8 billion yards of cloth. the Great War of 1914–18 halted the supply of raw cotton, and the government encouraged its colonies to build mills to spin and weave cotton. The war over, Lancashire never regained its markets. The independent mills struggled. The Bank of England set up the Lancashire Cotton Corporation in 1929 to attempt to rationalise and save the industry. Empress Mill was one of 104 mills bought by the LCC, and one of the 53 mills that survived to 1950. It continued to spin until 1975. Its problems were explained in the House of Commons on 20 March 1975 by the constituency's MP Michael McGuire, that other producing countries were applying tariffs against British cotton, and dumping their surplus in the UK. He complained that Civil Servants had a "Bonga Wonga" attitude, and were doing nothing to support the Lancashire industry.

Its engine house and chimney have been demolished and replaced by a square tower. The land is now an industrial estate. The name Empress Mill was given by Jamsetji Tata on the day Queen Victoria was proclaimed Queen of India.

== Owners ==
- Empress Spinning Co (1920)
- Lancashire Cotton Corporation (1930–1964)
- Courtaulds (1964–1975)

== See also ==
- Textile manufacturing
- Cotton Mill

== Bibliography ==
- Dunkerley, Philip (2009). "Dunkerley-Tuson Family Website, The Regent Cotton Mill, Failsworth". Archived from the original on 23 March 2008.
- Farrer, William; Brownbill, J, eds. (1911). "Pemberton". A History of the County of Lancaster. Vol. 4. Victoria County History.
- LCC (1951). The mills and organisation of the Lancashire Cotton Corporation Limited. Blackfriars House, Manchester: Lancashire Cotton Corporation Limited.
- McNeil, R.; Nevell, M. (2000). A Guide to the Industrial Archaeology of Greater Manchester. Association for Industrial Archaeology. ISBN 978-0-9528930-3-5.
- Roberts, A S (1921). "Arthur Robert's Engine List". Arthur Roberts Black Book. One guy from Barlick-Book Transcription.
