= Monton Mill, Eccles =

Cotton mill in Greater Manchester, England

Monton Mill
- The mill before 1951

- Location in Greater Manchester

Spinning (ring mill)
- Location: Eccles, Greater Manchester, England
- Serving canal: Bridgewater Canal
- Serving railway: Liverpool and Manchester Railway
- Owner: Monton Mill Co
- Further ownership: Lancashire Cotton Corporation (1930s); Courtaulds (1964)
- Coordinates: 53.4907°N 2.3587°W

Construction
- Completed: 1906

Power
- Date: 1906
- Engine maker: George Saxon & Co
- Engine type: inverted vertical cross compound engine
- Valve Gear: Corliss valves
- Cylinder diameter and throw: 27"HP, 56"LP had a 4ft stroke
- rpm: 75rpm
- Flywheel diameter: 22ft

Boiler configuration
- Running temperature: 160psi

Equipment
- Manufacturer: Platt Brothers and Co

Monton Mill was a cotton spinning mill in Eccles, Greater Manchester, England, built in 1906. It was taken over by the Lancashire Cotton Corporation in the 1930s and passed to Courtaulds in 1964. After production ended, it was demolished and replaced with housing; its name is preserved in the street name.

== Location ==
Eccles (pop. 36,600) is a town in the City of Salford, a metropolitan borough of Greater Manchester in North West England, 2.7 miles (4.3 km) west of Salford and 3.7 miles (6.0 km) west of Manchester city centre. Historically a part of Lancashire, Eccles lies on sloping ground between the M602 motorway (to the north), and the Manchester Ship Canal (to the south). The town is served by the Bridgewater Canal and the Liverpool and Manchester Railway.

Monton Mill was situated on the west bank the Bridgewater Canal, 1.0 mile (1.6 km) north of the railway line.

== History ==
The parish of Eccles contained the townships of Barton-upon-Irwell, Clifton, Pendlebury, Pendleton, and Worsley. Toward the end of the Middle Ages the parish had an estimated population of about 4,000 Communicants. Agriculture remained an important local industry, with little change from the medieval system due to a lack of adequate drainage and fertiliser. Local cottage industries included blacksmiths, butchers, thatching, basket weaving, skinning, and tanning. Weaving was popular, using linen and wool. Merchants traded in corn, and badgers bought and sold local produce.

During the 18th century the predominance of textiles in the region is partly demonstrated in the parish registers of 1807, which show that 46 children were baptised with 34 fathers employed as weavers. During the early 19th century the growth of industry meant the majority of the area's inhabitants were employed in textiles or trade, while a minority worked in agriculture. The factory system was also introduced; in 1835 1,124 people were employed in cotton mills, and two mills used power looms. Local hand-produced specialities included striped cotton ticks, checks, Nankeens, and Camrays. Two cotton mills are visible on the 1845 Ordnance Survey map of the area. The area also became renowned for its production of silk, with two mills at Eccles and one at Patricroft.

The engine of growth in the second half of the 19th century was the joint stock company, whereby capital could be raised for the construction of new mills. The first joint stock boom was in the early 1860s and the final boom, between 1904 and 1910 produced dozen of mills designed by the same firms of Oldham architects. Monton Mill was built in 1906, a typical mill of this period.

The industry peaked in 1912 when it produced 8 billion yards of cloth. The Great War of 1914–18 halted the supply of raw cotton, and the British government encouraged its colonies to build mills to spin and weave cotton. The war over, Lancashire never regained its markets. The independent mills were struggling. The Bank of England set up the Lancashire Cotton Corporation in 1929 to attempt to rationalise and save the industry. Monton Mill, Eccles was one of 104 mills bought by the LCC, and one of the 53 mills that survived through to 1950.

== Architecture ==
=== Power ===
It was driven by a 1400 hp inverted vertical cross compound engine by George Saxon & Co of Openshaw, built in 1906. The cylinders, 27"HP, 56"LP had a 4-foot stroke. It was steamed at 160psi by four Lancashire boilers supplied by Galloways. The 22-foot flywheel ran at 75rpm.

=== Equipment ===
The mill was furnished with 91,680 mule spindles, divided into 26,784 twist spindles and 64,896 weft spindles, producing medium counts of average 32's twist and 42's weft. Most of the textile machinery was supplied by Platt Brothers and Co, of Oldham.

== Usage ==
=== Owners ===
- Monton Mill Co
- Lancashire Cotton Corporation (1930s–1964)
- Courtaulds (1964–
- Ward and Goldstone, makers of Volex electrical products
- A.J. Flatley

== See also ==
- Textile manufacturing

== Bibliography ==
- Dunkerley, Philip (2009). "Dunkerley-Tuson Family Website, The Regent Cotton Mill, Failsworth". Archived from the original on 23 March 2008.
- Harland, John (1857), The House and Farm Accounts of the Shuttleworths of Gawthorpe Hall, in the County of Lancaster, at Smithils and Gawthorpe: From September 1582 to October 1621, Chetham society
- LCC (1951). The mills and organisation of the Lancashire Cotton Corporation Limited. Blackfriars House, Manchester: Lancashire Cotton Corporation Limited.
- Johnston, F. R. (1967), Eccles, the growth of a Lancashire town, Eccles; Manchester: Eccles and District History Society
- Nevell, Mike (1997), The Archaeology of Trafford, Trafford Metropolitan Borough with University of Manchester Archaeological Unit, ISBN 1-870695-25-9
- Roberts, A S (1921), "Arthur Robert's Engine List", Arthur Roberts Black Book., One guy from Barlick-Book Transcription, archived from the original on 23 July 2011
