= Stewart baronets of Strathgarry (1960) =

The Stewart Baronetcy, of Strathgarry in the County of Perth, was created in the Baronetage of the United Kingdom on 17 August 1960 for Kenneth Dugald Stewart. He was Chairman of the Trustee Savings Bank Association from 1946 to 1965. The third Baronet died in 2022 and as there were no living male descendants of the first Baronet, the baronetcy is extinct.

== Stewart baronets, of Strathgarry (1960) ==
- Sir Kenneth Dugald Stewart, GBE, 1st Baronet (1882–1972)
- Sir David Brodribb Stewart, 2nd Baronet (1913–1992)
- Sir Alastair Robin Stewart, 3rd Baronet (1925–2022)

Coat of arms of Stewart baronets of Strathgarry

Crest
A unicorn's head couped Argent and armed and crined Or.
Escutcheon
Quarterly: 1st & 4th Or a fess chequy Azure and Argent (Stewart); 2nd & 3rd Argent a galley Sable sails furled oars in action Proper flagged Gules (Lorne); the whole within a bordure per pale dexter Vert sinister Argent charged with three roses Gules barbed and seeded Vert.
Motto
Quhidder Will Zie
