= Sir Kenneth Stewart, 1st Baronet =

20th-century Scottish merchant and baronet

- Sir Kenneth Stewart, 1931
- Born: Kenneth Dugald Stewart; 29 March 1882; London, England
- Died: 19 May 1972 (aged 90); Alderley Edge, Cheshire
- Occupation: Merchant

Sir Kenneth Dugald Stewart of Strathgarry, 1st Baronet GBE (29 March 1882 – 19 May 1972) was a Scottish merchant who was President of Trustee Savings Banks Association and the first chairman of the Lancashire Cotton Corporation.

== Biography ==
Stewart was born in London, the fourth son of East India merchant Hinton Daniell Stewart, 6th Laird of Strathgarry, Killiecrankie, Pitlochry, Perth and Kinross. He was a member of Clan Stewart of Appin. His mother, Lucy Macfarlane, was the daughter of Dr. Donald Macfarlane of Perth.

Stewart was educated at Trinity College, Glenalmond. He worked for Maitland and Co. Ltd., in Shanghai from 1903 to 1919. He was British delegate to the Special Conference on the Chinese Customs Tariff, October 1925 to April 1926 in Peking.

Stewart was first chairman of the Lancashire Cotton Corporation, created by the Bank of England to save the Lancashire spinning industry by means of horizontal rationalisation. It merged 105 companies into one. He served as chairman from 1928 to 1932.

He was chairman of the Trustee Savings Banks Association 1946-66 and was president in 1966. In 1958, he was appointed vice-chairman of the National Savings Committee.

== Personal life ==
In 1913, he married Australian Olive Noel Brodribb (died 1946), with whom he had two sons and two daughters.

He died in 1972 at his home at Newton House in Alderley Edge, Cheshire. His elder son, David Brodribb Stewart (1913–1992), succeeded him in the baronetcy. His second son, Alastair Robin Stewart (1925–2022), succeeded his brother; he was only survived by daughters, leaving the baronetcy extinct.

== Honours ==
Stewart was appointed Knight Commander of the Order of the British Empire (KBE) in the 1927 Birthday Honours. He was promoted to Knight Grand Cross (GBE) of the order in the 1950 Birthday Honours.

He was created a Baronet, of Strathgarry in the County of Perth, in the 1960 Birthday Honours.

Baronetage of the United Kingdom
New creation	Baronet (of Strathgarry); 1960 – 1972	Succeeded by David Stewart
