= Yates and Thom =

British manufacturer of heavy machinery

Yates & Thom Ltd, or Yates of Blackburn, was a British manufacturer of stationary steam engines and boilers at the Canal Ironworks, Blackburn, Lancashire, England.

The company had its origins in a blacksmith's shop started by William Yates in 1824.

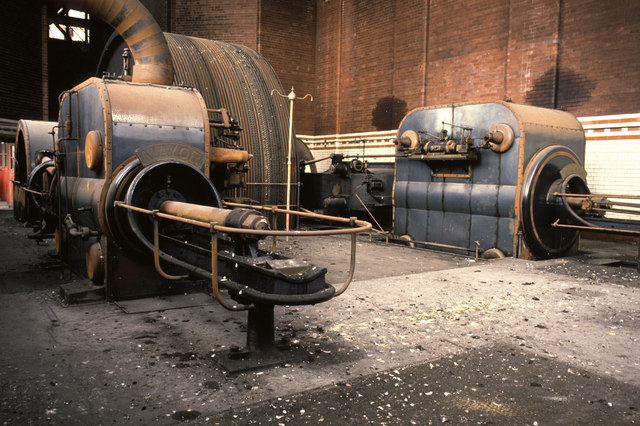
Leigh Spinners cross compound steam engine

In the 1860s, the company supplied a cam operated, drop valve compound engine operating at 100 psi to the India Mill, Darwen. Other mills supplied by Yates and Thom included the Durban Mill, Oldham. This was an 1800 hp triple-expansion four-cylinder engine built in 1906. It had a 24" HP cylinder, a 29" IP cylinder and two 38" LP cylinders with a 5 ft 6 in stroke. At 180 psi, it drove a 27-ft, 67-ton flywheel with 38 ropes at 65 rpm. It used Corliss valves on all cylinders. An engine, one of a pair supplied by the firm, survives at Leigh Spinners.

The company supplied a 3,300 horsepower twin tandem compound engine, which survives in the engine house at the Astley Green Colliery Museum. It was the largest steam winding engine used on the Lancashire Coalfield.

In 1928, the company became Foster, Yates and Thom when it was acquired by Joseph Foster & Sons. The company continued to manufacture boilers until 1964, with the remainder of the works closing in 1973.
