= George Saxon & Co =

English engineering company

Coordinates: 53°28′26″N 2°10′45″W

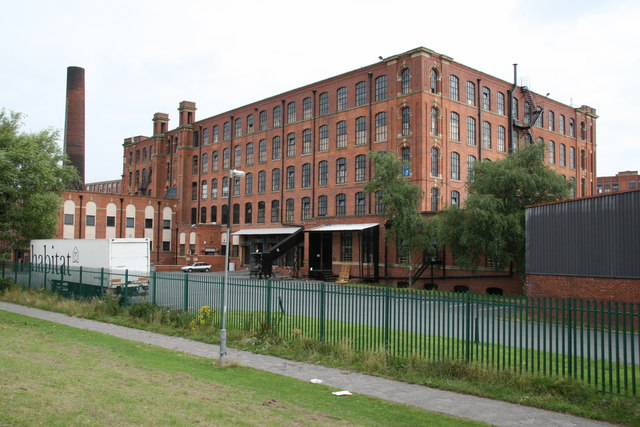
- Brook No. 2 Mill, Hollinwood, showing engine house suitable for a George Saxon four cylinder engine
- Industry: Engineering
- Founded: 1878
- Founder: George Saxon
- Defunct: 1943 (closed)
- Headquarters: Openshaw, Manchester, England
- Number of locations: 3 Hawthorn Mill, Chadderton, Magnet Mill, Chadderton, Broadstone Mill, Reddish
- Products: Triple expansion cross compound with Corliss valvess, Manhattan engine

George Saxon & Co was an English engineering company that manufactured stationary steam engines. It was based in the Openshaw district of Manchester. The company produced large steam-driven engines for power stations and later for textile mills in Lancashire and elsewhere.

== Biography ==
George Saxon was born in Manchester in 1821. He served an apprenticeship with William Fairbairn and rose to supervisor. In 1851, he moved to be foreman at Benjamin Goodfellow's works in Hyde, Greater Manchester. Here in 1854, he invented and patented a fusible plug for steam boilers. That year he formed his own business at Spring Works, Openshaw, trading as George Saxon. He was a mill-wright. He probably started manufacturing steam engines in 1860. He patented many small improvements to engine design. He was elected president of the Manchester Association of Engineers in 1871. He was also a member of the Institute of Mechanical Engineers. In February 1879 he patented an automatic cut-off motion, which made his engines more economical. He believed in the use of a long cylinder stroke on his horizontal engines to produce more power. His sons followed him into the business and continued it after his death in 1879.

== History ==
Up to 1860 Saxon appears to have mainly concentrated on engine repair work and producing mill gearing and shafting. Spring Works was extended in 1860 by the addition of an erecting shop when engine making seems to have started in a small way and was further expanded in 1870. An example of an early Saxon engine was one built in the 1860s for a Manchester confectionery firm which was a horizontal single-cylinder non-condensing engine, 60 ihp, with a Meyer variable cut-off slide valve. The construction of larger engines had started by 1870/71 when they built a horizontal cross compound engine, possibly for an Oldham customer, which used steam at the relatively high pressure for that time of 100 lbs psi. By 1875 Saxon was building engines of between 750 and 1,000 ihp, for the new 'Oldham Limiteds'. These were mostly horizontal twin tandem compound engines - a 4-cylinder design for which Saxons became noted during the last quarter of the 19th century. During 1871–80 Saxons are known to have built at least 10 engines with a capacity of about 6,800 ihp, mostly for cotton mills.

George Saxon engines were characterised by having a long stroke and high operating speed. They used Corliss valves on their large mill engines from around 1890 onwards, having previously used slide valves in their engines. The Saxon design dispensed with the wrist plate and unusually placed Corliss valves on both the HP (high-pressure) and LP (low-pressure) cylinders where other designers, such as McNaught and Petrie would have used piston valves. Saxons were late adopters of Corliss valve engines but were quick to adopt the efficient triple-expansion engine design. During 1891 and 1892 they converted a number of large compound engines to triple-expansion, with a saving in fuel of up to 18%, and in 1892 they built their first horizontal twin tandem triple-expansion engine, 1,260 ihp, for Rock Mill, Ashton-under-Lyne. They also continued to build large horizontal twin tandem compound engines. Near-identical engines Saxons built in 1902 for Dawn Mill, Shaw, and Magnet Mill, Chadderton, developed 1400 hp at 140 psi and 1700 hp at 160 psi. The flywheels of these engines were 26 ft in diameter and weighed between 80 and 90 tons. The speed of 60 rpm and stroke of 5 ft was standard at this time.

Saxons built their first inverted vertical engine in 1896, a space-efficient design that became quite popular with mill builders. They built some particularly large engines. In 1908 they built a 2,750 ihp engine for No 2 Mill, Times Mill, Middleton – their largest to be built in the Oldham area. In Pear New Mill, Stockport, and Hall Lane Spinning Mill, Leigh, George Saxon used the Manhattan design. This design was so named because Allis-Chalmers, in designing a 60,000 h.p. engine to generate electricity for the Manhattan transport system, had been faced with a small site and had laid out the 88-inch-diameter low-pressure cylinders horizontally, and the 44-inch high-pressure cylinders vertically. This had enabled eight strokes per revolution instead of the former four, leading to a smoother motion.

Saxons were very busy during the first decade of the 20th century, especially during 1901–02 and 1905–08. They built 85 engines aggregating 90,240 ihp between 1901 and 1910. However, with the advent of the First World War in 1914, their engine output declined rapidly. They also exported a small number of horizontal cross-compound engines to India during the 1890s and early 1900s.

The last mill engine produced by George Saxon is reputed to be one made for J J Hadfield, a bleachworks in Chinley. This final specimen was built in 1928 and was a 450 hp cross-compound engine. The technical specifications included 16 1/2-inch-diameter HP (high-pressure) cylinder, a 31-inch LP and a 3 ft 6 in stroke. It was steamed at 120 psi, and drove a 16 ft flywheel with 12 ropes, at 100 rpm. It had Corliss valves on both cylinders. The horizontal condenser was behind the LP cylinder.

No engines have survived.

== Mills driven by their engines ==
- Junction Mill. Middleton - 1875, 1,000 ihp
- Boundary Mill, Oldham - 1875, 750 ihp
- Star Mill, Oldham - 1875, 750 ihp
- Hawthorn Mill, Chadderton
- Lark Mill, Hollinwood - 1901
- Curzon Mill, Ashton-under-Lyne - 1901
- Magnet Mill, Chadderton,
- Monton Mill, Eccles
- Broadstone Mill, Reddish
- Cairo Mill, Waterhead, Oldham, Triple expansion
- Irk Mill, Middleton, a Manhattan
- Fox Mill, Hollinwood, a Manhattan
- Ridgefield Mill, Failsworth, a Manhattan
- Swan Lane Mills, Bolton, 1200 hp
