= Cotton-spinning machinery =

Machinery used to spin cotton

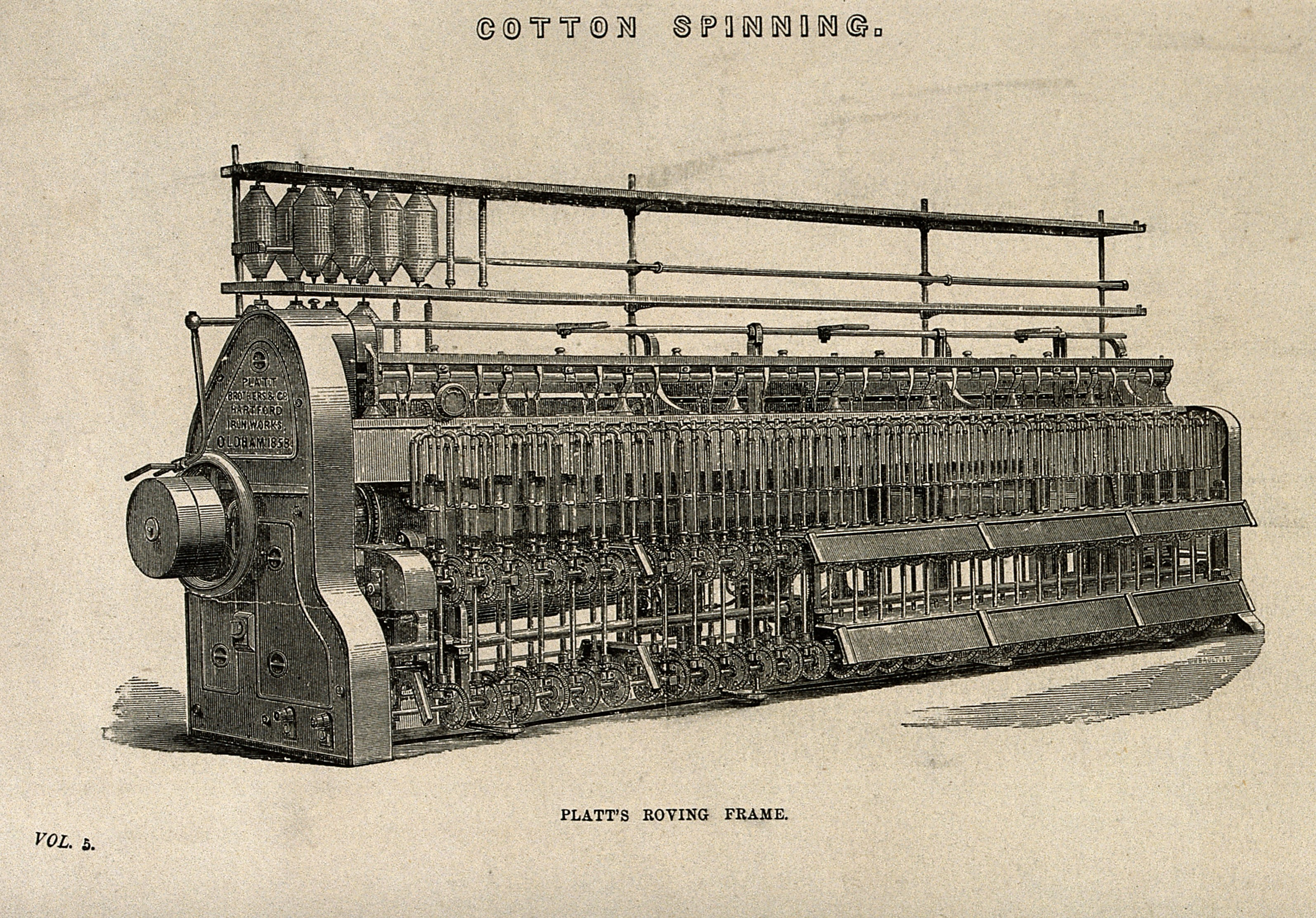
Platt's roving frame, c. 1858.

Cotton-spinning machinery is machines which process (or spin) prepared cotton roving into workable yarn or thread. Such machinery can be dated back centuries. During the 18th and 19th centuries, as part of the Industrial Revolution cotton-spinning machinery was developed to bring mass production to the cotton industry. Cotton spinning machinery was installed in large factories, commonly known as cotton mills.

== History ==
=== Spinning wheel ===
The spinning wheel was invented in the Islamic world by 1030. It later spread to China by 1090, and then spread from the Islamic world to Europe and India by the 13th century.

Until the 1740s all spinning was done by hand using a spinning wheel. The state of the art spinning wheel in England was known as the Jersey wheel; however, an alternative wheel, the Saxony wheel, was a double band treadle spinning wheel where the spindle rotated faster than the traveller in a ratio of 8:6. Drawing on both was done by the spinner's fingers.

=== Lewis Paul and John Wyatt ===
In 1738 Lewis Paul and John Wyatt of Birmingham patented the Roller Spinning machine and the flyer-and-bobbin system, for drawing cotton to a more even thickness, using two sets of rollers that travelled at different speeds. This principle was the basis of Richard Arkwright's later water frame design. By 1742 Paul and Wyatt had opened a mill in Birmingham which used their new rolling machine powered by a donkey, this was not profitable and soon closed. A factory was opened in Northampton in 1743, with fifty spindles turning on five of Paul and Wyatt's machines, proving more successful than their first mill; this operated until 1764.

Lewis Paul invented the hand-driven carding machine in 1748. A coat of wire slips were placed around a card, which was then wrapped around a cylinder. Lewis' invention was later developed and improved by Richard Arkwright and Samuel Crompton, although the design came under suspicion after a fire at Daniel Bourn's factory in Leominster which used Paul and Wyatt's spindles. Bourn produced a similar patent in the same year.

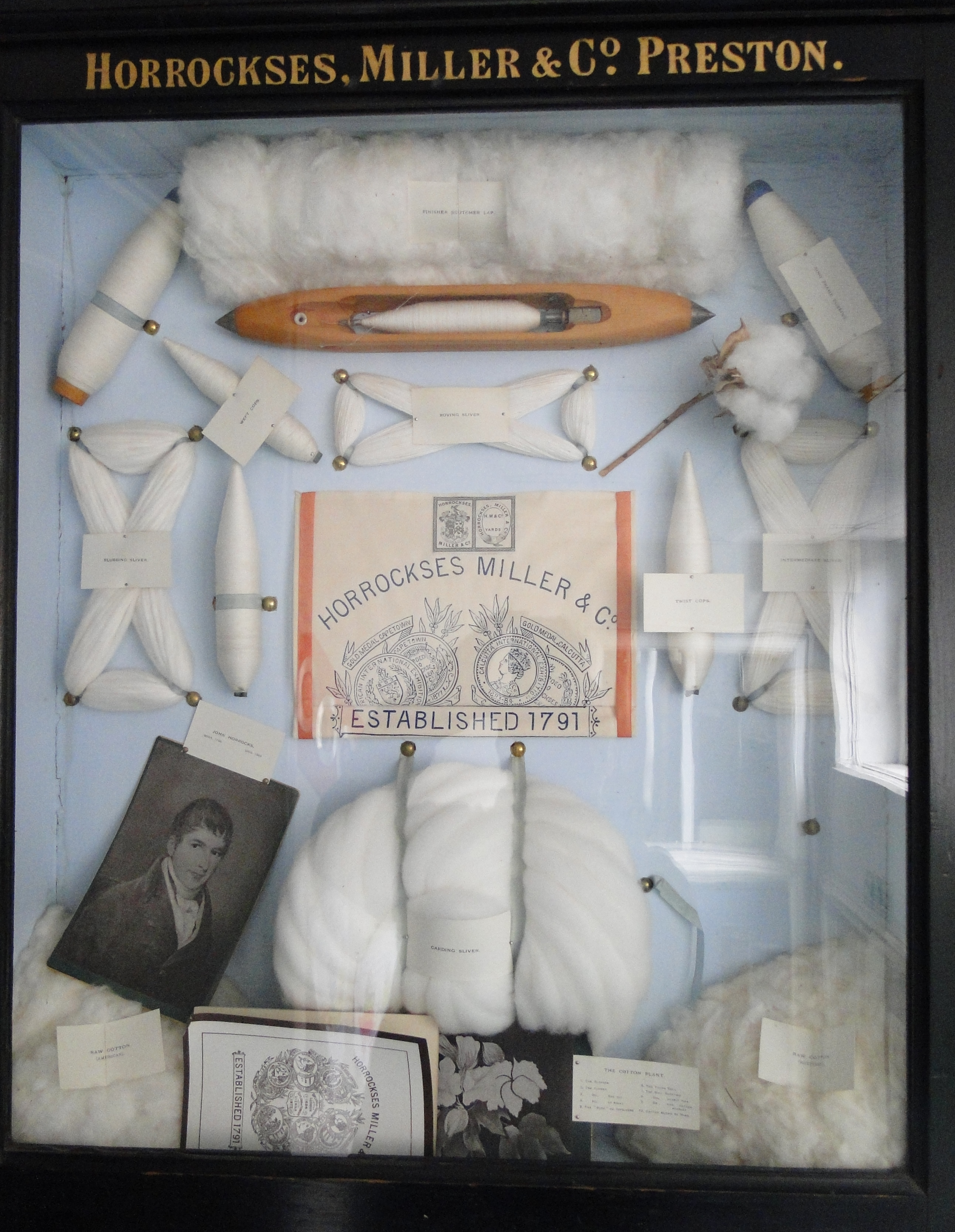
Old advertising display of items used in cotton textile manufacture during the industrial revolution

Rev John Dyer of Northampton recognised the importance of the Paul and Wyatt cotton spinning machine in a poem in 1757:

A circular machine, of new design
In conic shape: it draws and spins a thread
Without the tedious toil of needless hands.
A wheel invisible, beneath the floor,
To ev'ry member of th' harmonius frame,
Gives necessary motion. One intent
O'erlooks the work; the carded wool, he says,
So smoothly lapped around those cylinders,
Which gently turning, yield it to yon cirue
Of upright spindles, which with rapid whirl
Spin out in long extenet an even twine.

=== Spinning jenny ===
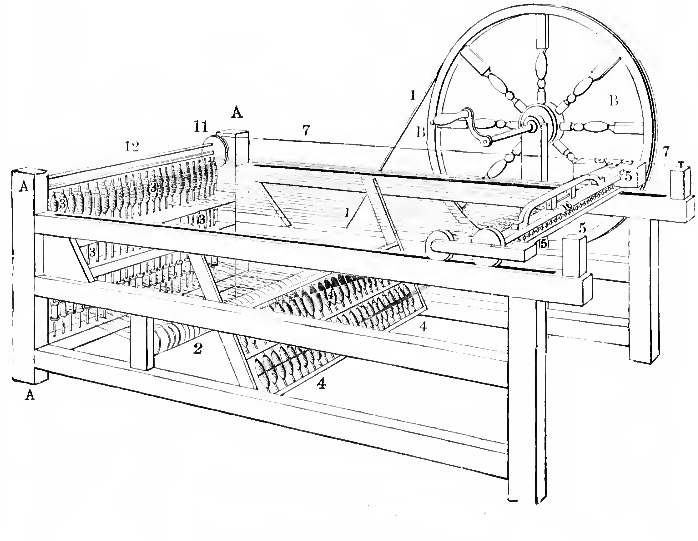
The spinning jenny that was used in textile mills

The spinning jenny is a multi-spool spinning wheel. It was invented circa 1764, its invention attributed to James Hargreaves in Stanhill, near Blackburn, Lancashire. The spinning jenny was essentially an adaptation of the spinning wheel.

=== Water frame ===
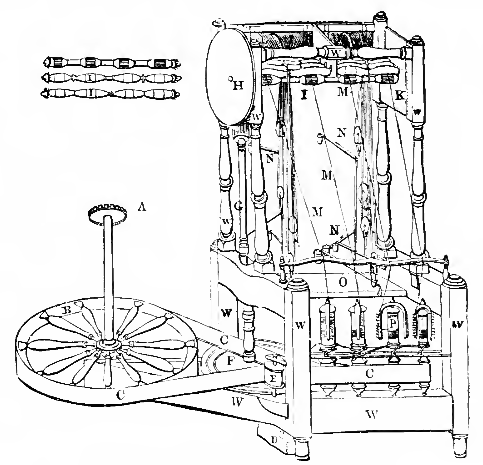
Arkwright's spinning frame

The Water frame was developed and patented by Arkwright in the 1770s. The roving was attenuated (stretched) by drafting rollers and twisted by winding it onto a spindle. It was heavy large scale machine that needed to be driven by power, which in the late 18th century meant by a water wheel. Cotton mills were designed for the purpose by Arkwright, Jedediah Strutt and others along the River Derwent in Derbyshire. Water frames could only spin left.

=== Spinning mule ===
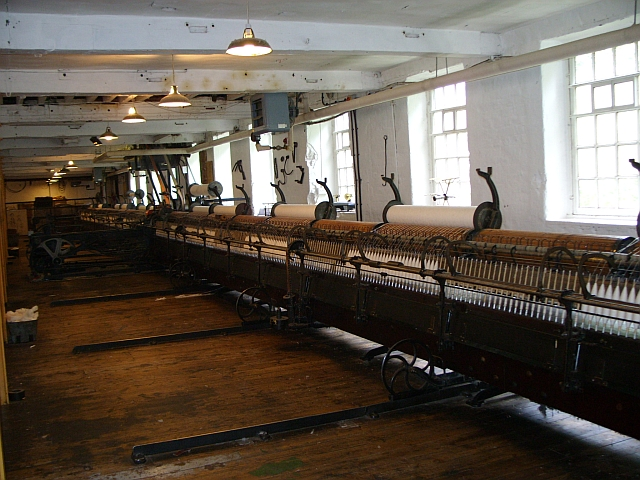
A fully restored & working mule at the Quarry Bank Mill, UK.

The spinning mule or mule jenny was created in 1779 by Samuel Crompton. It was a combination of Arkwright's water frame and Hargreaves' spinning jenny. It was so named because it was a hybrid of these two machines. The mule consisted of a fixed frame containing a creel of bobbins holding the roving, connected through the headstock to a parallel carriage containing the spindles. It used an intermittent process: On the outward traverse, the rovings were paid out, and twisted, and the return traverse, the roving was clamped and the spindles reversed taking up the newly spun thread. The rival machine, the throstle frame or ring frame was a continuous process, where the roving was drawn twisted and wrapped in one action. The spinning mule became self-acting (automatic) in 1830s. The mule was the most common spinning machine from 1790 until about 1900, but was still used for fine yarns until the 1960s. A cotton mill in 1890 would contain over 60 mules, each with 1320 spindles.

Between the years 1824 and 1830 Richard Roberts invented a mechanism that rendered all parts of the mule self-acting, regulating the rotation of the spindles during the inward run of the carriage.

The Platt Brothers, based in Oldham, Greater Manchester were amongst the most prominent machine makers in this field of work.

At first this machine was only used to spin coarse and low-to-medium counts, but it is now employed to spin all counts of yarn.

=== Throstle ===
The Throstle frame was a descendant of the water frame. It used the same principles, was better engineered and driven by steam. In 1828 the Danforth throstle frame was invented in the United States. The heavy flyer caused the spindle to vibrate, and the yarn snarled every time the frame was stopped. Not a success. It was named throstle, as the noise it made when running was compared to the song of the throstle (thrush).

=== Ring frame ===
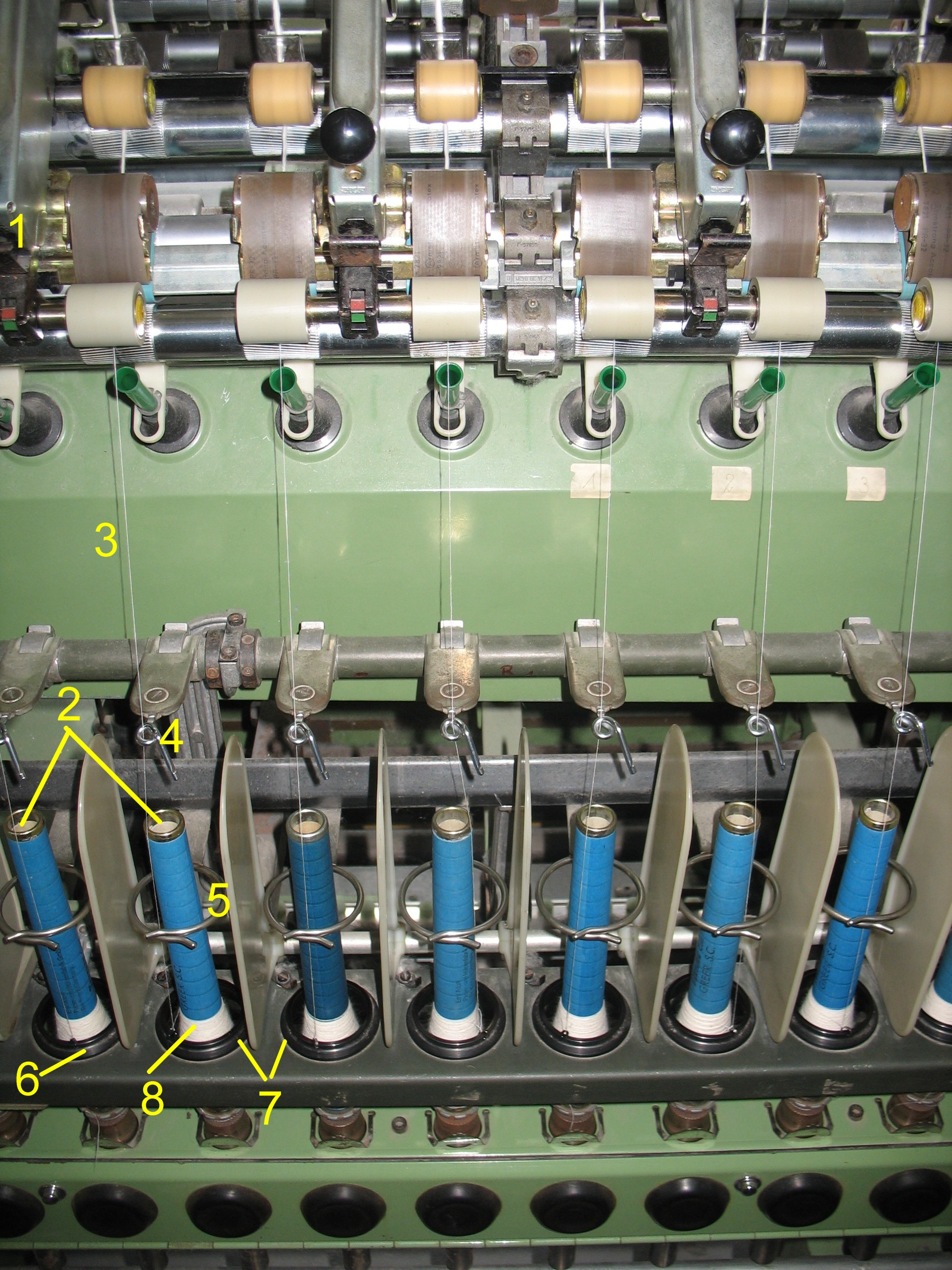
Modern ring spinning frame 1 Draughting rollers 2 Spindle 3 Attenuated roving 4 Thread guides 5 Anti-ballooning ring 6 Traveller 7 Rings 8 Thread on bobbin

The Ring frame is credited to John Thorp in Rhode Island in 1828/9 and developed by Mr. Jencks of Pawtucket, Rhode Island, who (Marsden 1884) names as the inventor.

The bobbins or tubes may be filled from "cops", "ring spools" or "hanks", but a stop motion is required for each thread, which will come into operation immediately a fracture occurs.

=== Break or open-end spinning ===
Open-end spinning (also known as break or rotor spinning) was developed in the mid-20th century as a high-productivity alternative to ring spinning, with the first commercially successful rotor spinning machines introduced in the late 1950s and early 1960s (notably by Rieter and other European manufacturers).

By feeding fiber slivers directly and eliminating the roving stage, open-end spinning significantly increased output rates and reduced labor requirements. Although the resulting yarns are generally bulkier and less strong than ring-spun yarns, the method became widely adopted for medium and coarse-count yarns and remains one of the most important spinning technologies in modern mass production.

=== Air-jet spinning ===
Air-jet spinning is a modern yarn production method commercialized in the 1980s. It uses high-velocity compressed air to twist fibers into yarn. In this process, a fiber strand is drawn through a nozzle where air creates a vortex, wrapping fibers around a parallel core. This technique produces yarns with low hairiness and high production rates, making it suitable for applications requiring smooth, uniform yarns.

=== DREF friction spinning ===
DREF spinning is a friction-based open-end spinning system developed by Dr. Ernst Fehrer in the 1970s, with the first commercial machines (DREF-II) introduced in 1973 in Austria. Unlike rotor spinning, DREF was optimized for very coarse yarns, technical textiles, and core-sheath structures rather than apparel-grade yarns. While its yarn strength is comparatively low, the system found niche adoption where high production speed, bulk, and the ability to incorporate core materials were more important than fineness or uniformity.

== Further processes ==
For many purposes, the threads as spun by the ring frame or the mule are ready for the manufacturer; but where extra strength or smoothness is required, as in threads for sewing, crocheting, hosiery, lace and carpets; also where multicoloured effects are needed, as in Grandrelle, or some special form of irregularity, as in corkscrewed, and knopped yarns, two or more single threads are compounded and twisted together. This operation is known as "doubling".

Cotton manufacturing processes
Bale breaker
Willowing
Breaker scutcher | Batting
Finishing scutcher | Lapping
Carding
Sliver lap
Combing
Drawing
Slubbing
Intermediate
Roving | Fine roving
Mule spinning | Ring spinning
Reeling
Winding | Bundling
Weaving shed
Beaming
Warping
Sizing/slashing/dressing
Weaving
Cloth | Yarn (cheese) Bundle

Blowing room
Teasing
Carding room
Spinning
Doubling
Bleaching
Winding
Cabling
Gassing
Spooling
Sewing thread

== See also ==
- Cotton mill
- Textile manufacture during the Industrial Revolution
- Textile manufacturing
- Timeline of clothing and textiles technology

== Bibliography ==
- Marsden, Richard (1884). Cotton Spinning: its development, principles and practice. George Bell and Sons 1903.
- Marsden, ed. (1909). Cotton Yearbook 1910. Manchester: Marsden and Co.
- Nasmith, Joseph (1895). Recent Cotton Mill Construction and Engineering. London: John Heywood. p. 284. ISBN 1-4021-4558-6.
- Williams, Mike; Farnie (1992). Cotton Mills of Greater Manchester. Carnegie Publishing. ISBN 0-948789-89-1.
