= Lancashire Cotton Corporation =

United Kingdom cotton business

- Industry: Textile manufacturing
- Founded: 1929
- Founder: Sir K. D. Stewart
- Headquarters: England
- Key people: Sir Frank Platt

The Lancashire Cotton Corporation was a company set up by the Bank of England in 1929, to rescue the Lancashire spinning industry by means of horizontal rationalisation. In merged 105 companies, ending up in 1950 with 53 operating mills. It was bought up by Courtaulds in August 1964.

== Formation ==
By the late 1920s the situation of the cotton industry in Lancashire was desperate. Many spinning mills and weaving sheds had closed down, the stock market had crashed and a general slump was affecting western economies. Political action was called for. Within the cotton industry the main problem was in the spinning sector; weaving was having a rough time, and the finishing trades were getting by, but in spinning a cutthroat competition between individual enterprises was destroying them. Things were hard for shareholders; they were no better for the banks that had, in effect, had the assets thrust into their hands as companies defaulted on their loans.

It was for this reason that the Bank of England became involved. It promoted the establishment of a quasi-governmental authority, to be called the Lancashire Cotton Corporation (LCC), which was set up in 1929, headed by Sir Kenneth Dugald Stewart. Its target was to control ten million spindle and rationalise production by central planning. It would use the most efficient plants to lower production costs, and would scrap uneconomic mills. The state enterprise had access to unlimited capital on which it paid no interest. The small mill owners couldn't compete. The aim was to win back export markets, and thus save some of the Lancashire industry; but this failed, its customers were in the main domestic. The LCC succeeded in buying out 96 companies, which represented a quarter of the industry's spindles.

During 1928 there were difficult negotiations to persuade creditors and shareholders to exchange their shares for Income Debentures and Shares in the LCC. It established central purchasing and marketing organisations and progressively took control of mills and weaving sheds. Sometimes the mills were closed down and scrapped, but others were brought back into production per the plan. Small share holders held worthless shares while the banks benefited by being to keep the assets on their balance sheets until the time was opportune to manage a liquidation, thus preventing a banking crisis.

LCC attempted a capital raising exercise in 1931, the prospectus being published in The Times on 26 March. It was for £2 million six-year 6.5% First Mortgage Debenture Stock and in the event, though competitively priced, 96% was left with the underwriters, The Sun Insurance Office. Lancashire had been too hurt, and become too sceptical, by the debacle of its cotton industry and there was no faith left.

By 1930, several dozen mills had been taken over, the names and dates of the contracts signed with the LCC being published in the prospectus. The LCC ran a trading loss of £382,795 in 1932, then a loss of £69,766 in 1933 but turned a profit of £30,189 in 1934. Although this looks creditable, it is likely that the accounts of the organisation would not have reflected the real commercial state of the business. In January 1935 the LCC owned 5,361,000 equivalent mule spindles and had scrapped 4,630,000 others. Of 140 mills it had acquired, 74 had been, or were being, scrapped at that time.

== Sir Frank Platt ==
Sir Frank Platt (1890–1955) became a director in mid 1932, and managing director in 1933, his scheme to merge a further 44 companies, and 5 million spindles did not get bank backing. Platt spent the thirties fighting to save the struggling company. He supported the Cotton Spinning Industry Act 1936 which allowed the buying up and destruction of surplus looms. He used his wartime post as Cotton Controller to continue to argue for further rationalisation.

In the 1944 Platt Report, he emphasised the labour productivity gap between the British and American mills, and argued that the United Kingdom should reorganise on their vertical model.

In October 1950 the company claimed fixed assets of £4,227,120 and current assets of £11 695 946. It had £4,058,526 in shares and had £683,010 in the profit and loss account.

== Hopwood Hall ==
The Colonel Hopwood offered Hopwood Hall for sale on 10 May 1922. He failed to sell. The hall was in a poor state when it was taken over by the Lancashire Cotton Corporation during World War II. The corporation used Hopwood Hall, in conjunction with Blackfriars House to run the firm during the wartime years. After the war the Lancashire Cotton Corporation sold the hall to a trust in 1946, under which it became a training college for Catholic teachers under the De La Salle Brothers.

== The final days ==
Imperial Chemical Industries (ICI) and Courtaulds were major players in the textile industry, who had been discussing merger and then attempted take-overs. These failed. Courtaulds returned to its plans for reorganising the textile industry. The company has said that by the early 1960s it was becoming increasingly apparent to it that the provisions of the Cotton Industry Act 1959 were insufficient to ensure the future and strength of all sectors of the textile industry; new capital and management were needed to achieve re-equipment and re-organisation into the different and more stream-lined groups essential if the industry was to become economically viable.

In the autumn of 1962, Courtaulds conceived a plan which it called its Northern Project and it entered into negotiations with five major textile groups, namely Lancashire Cotton Corporation, Combined English Mills (Spinners), English Sewing Cotton Company, Fine Spinners & Doublers and Tootals. It was at first envisaged that Courtaulds would acquire the five companies but this was later modified to a scheme whereby the five would exchange their existing shares for shares in a new joint company and Courtaulds would buy shares in the new company by providing relatively large amounts of cash to finance re-equipment. The Board of Trade were informed of the intended re-grouping. Between December 1962 and April 1963 Courtaulds, ICI and the five textile companies concerned together examined the Northern Project in detail, but a financial agreement was not reached.

ICI and Courtaulds then pursued different policies in acquisition, and between July and August 1964 Courtaulds acquired the whole of the equity capital of Lancashire Cotton Corporation and Fine Spinners & Doublers, becoming thereby the owner of 30% of the spinning capacity of the Lancashire textile industry.

== See also ==
- List of mills owned by the Lancashire Cotton Corporation Limited
