= List of mills in the Metropolitan Borough of Oldham =

This list of mills in the Metropolitan Borough of Oldham, lists textile factories that have existed in Oldham Borough, Greater Manchester, England.

From the Industrial Revolution until the 20th century, Oldham was a major centre of textile manufacture, particularly cotton spinning. During this period, the valleys of the River Beal, River Irk, River Medlock and their tributaries were dominated by large rectangular brick-built factories, many of which still remain today as warehouses or converted for residential or retail use.

== Oldham ==
Name	Architect	Location	Built	Demolished	Served (Years)
Abbey / Neville Mill	Abraham Henthorn Stott	Neville Street ,	1875	1936	59
Ace	Philip Sidney Stott	Hollinwood, SD897037 53°31′48″N 2°09′25″W	1914	Standing	53
Acorn Mill		Lees			
Albert Mills		Derker	1865	2008	116
Albion	Stott	Bradshaw Street	1883		
Albion	Wild, Collins	Under Lane, Chadderton	1884	1938	
Anchor	Joseph Stott	Featherstall Road North, Westwood, 53°32′39″N 2°07′43″W	1881	Standing	145
Athens Mill		Brook Lane, Lees	1905	1988	77
Bank Top Mill, Salem	Edward Potts	Edmund Street, Salem	1875	1994	115
Belgrave	Potts, Pickup and Dixon	Hathershaw	1885	Standing	127
Bell		Claremont St, Oldham	1904	Standing	122
Broadway Mill	Joseph Stott	Goddard St & Scottfield Rd	1875	1964	89
Brook		Hathershaw			
Cairo	Phillip Sidney Stott	Waterhead	1920	Standing	106
Coldhurst Mill		Rochdale Rd, Coldhurst	1876	1974	86
Cromford Mill		Derker			
Derker Mills		Derker			
Devon Mill	George Stott	Hollins	1908	Standing	118
Dowry Mill		Lees/Waterhead (Turner St)			
Durban Mill		Hollins Rd, Hollinwood, 53°31′28″N 2°07′52″W	1905	2015	110
Earl Mill	Philip Sidney Stott	Dowry St/Ashton Rd, Hathershaw	1860 (rebuilt 1891)	Standing	
Fox Mill		Hollinwood , 53°31′12″N 2°08′05″W	1908	1992	84
Glen Mill		Wellyhole St	1903	1970	35
Granville Mill		Derker			
Greenacres Mill		Littlemoor			
Greenbank Mills		Glodwick Road/Greengate Street			
Gresham Mill		Westwood			
Hartford Mill	F.W.Dixon		1907	2020	52
Heron		Hollins		Standing	
Holroyd Mill		Waterhead (Replaced by Orb)			
Holyrood Mill		Higginshaw			
Honeywell Mill		Hathershaw	1874		152
Leesbrook	Stott	Lees	1884	Standing	142
Littlemoor Mill		Littlemoor			
Lowerhey Mill		Lees			
Majestic		Waterhead		Standing	
Maple 1	Philip Sidney Stott	Hathershaw, 53°31′34″N 2°06′26″W	1904	2016	112
Maple 2	Philip Sidney Stott	Hathershaw SD9303 53°31′34″N 2°06′26″W	1915	2009	94
Orme		Greenacres Road, Waterhead, 53°32′53″N 2°04′26″W	1908	Standing	118
Orb Mill		Culvert St, Waterhead , 53°33′02″N 2°04′19″W	1907	2003	75
Owl Mill	Collings & Wild	New Street, Lees , 53°32′21″N 2°04′26″W	1893	1993	97
Prince of Wales Mill	Edward Potts	Derker , 53°33′01″N 2°05′21″W	1875		151
Rome Mill	Philip Sidney Stott	Ashes Lane, Springhead, Lees , 53°32′18″N 2°03′41″W	1907		119
Royd		Hollins, SD 53°31′38″N 2°07′58″W	1907	2015	74
Ruby Mill	Stott	Littlemoor , 53°33′06″N 2°05′00″W	1887		139
Stamford Mill	Stott	St Johns St, Lees , 53°32′24″N 2°04′14″W	1887		139
Springhey Mill		Waterhead			
Tay Mill		Higginshaw			
Vale Mill		Chapel Road, Oldham, 53°31′32″N 2°08′09″W	1868	Standing	78
Werneth Mill		Manchester Rd, Werneth, 53°33′00″N 2°07′20″W		Standing	

== Chadderton ==
Name	Architect	Location	Built	Demolished	Served (Years)
Ace	P.S.Stott	SD897037 53°31′48″N 2°09′25″W	1914	Standing	53
Acorn		Union St, SD909038 53°31′52″N 2°08′20″W	c1860	c1916*	
Alder Root (aka Glenby)		Cowhill, SD911048 53°32′24″N 2°08′10″W	c1860	c1883	
Apex (Green Lane)			1871	c1928	
Asia	F.W.Dixon	Clayton St, SD912031 53°31′26″N 2°08′02″W	1904	1982	77
Avon (Landsdowne)		Crompton St, SD911052 53°32′35″N 2°08′10″W	1861	1937	
Bank	Thomas Ashton	Crossley Bridge	c1776	c1895*	
Baytree	Stott and Sons	SD888053 53°32′38″N 2°10′12″W	1903	1985	56
Bentfield		Peel Street, SD909049 53°32′28″N 2°08′20″W	1969	Standing	22
Boundary		Mills Hill Road, SD889058 53°32′56″N 2°10′08″W	c1860	c1932	
Bower		Henshaw Lane, 53°31′15″N 2°08′44″W	c1780	c1900	
Busk	P.S.Stott	SD913057 53°32′53″N 2°07′59″W	c1847	1931	
Butler Green	A.H.Stott	SD905038 53°31′52″N 2°08′42″W	1863	1948	72
Chadderton	P.S. Stott	Fields New Rd, SD907045 53°32′13″N 2°08′31″W	1885	Standing	115
Clarence	Wild	53°32′45″N 2°08′24″W	c1869	1889	
Clough		Hunt Clough	c1776	?	
Elk	A Turner & Sons	SD911068 53°33′29″N 2°08′10″W	1926	1999	
Falcon Mill	P S Stott	Garforth Street	1885	Standing	141
Fernhurst	A H Stott	SD911064 53°33′14″N 2°08′10″W	1905	2015	59
Firwood		Joshua Lane, SD889051 53°32′31″N 2°10′08″W	c1844	1960	
Forge Mill (Stock Lane Mill)		SD908049 53°32′28″N 2°08′24″W	1858	1978*	
Gem	FW Dixon	Fields New Rd, SD904040 53°31′59″N 2°08′46″W	1901	2008	36
Glebe		SD905030 53°31′26″N 2°08′42″W	1866	1973	104
Glenby (Alder Root)		Cowhill, SD911048 53°32′24″N 2°08′10″W	1885	1962	74
Gordon	J Wild	Elizabeth St, SD901033 53°31′34″N 2°09′04″W	1884	c1968	75
Gorse	P S Stott	SD897037 53°31′48″N 2°09′25″W	1908	Standing	51
Grimshaw	E Potts	SD888049 53°32′28″N 2°10′12″W	1874	c1946	
Hawthorn		SD912057 53°32′53″N 2°08′02″W	1878	1971	92
Junction	E. Potts	SD890049 53°32′28″N 2°10′01″W	1874	2000*	81
Kent	G Stott	Victoria St, SD912060 53°33′04″N 2°08′02″W	1908	1994	83
Lark	F.W.Dixon	SD904041 53°31′59″N 2°08′46″W	1901	1938	37
Laurel	Stott & Son	Chadderton, SD889052 53°32′35″N 2°10′08″W	1905	1988	
Logwood		Mill Brow, SD900068 53°33′29″N 2°09′07″W	c1859	c1923	
Magnet	F.W.Dixon	Denton Lane, SD904046 53°32′17″N 2°08′46″W	1902	c1967	
Malta	F.W.Dixon	Mills Hill Rd, SD889088 53°34′34″N 2°10′08″W	1905	Standing	58
Manor	G. Stott	Victoria St, SD911058 53°32′56″N 2°08′10″W	1906	Standing	84
Melbourne		SD908053 53°32′38″N 2°08′24″W	1860	1980	99
Melrose		SD906040 53°31′59″N 2°08′35″W	1869	c1942	66
Mills Hill		Corbrook Road	c1875	1909	
Mona	P.S.Stott	SD906043 53°32′06″N 2°08′35″W	1905	2012	54
Nile	P S Stott	Fields New Rd, SD905043 53°32′06″N 2°08′42″W	1898	Standing	
Oak	T.Mitchell	Spencer St, Coords	1874	1934	55
Osborne	Architect	Robinson St, SD914057 53°32′53″N 2°07′52″W	1853	1973	
Osborne	Architect	Osborne Street, SD914057 53°32′53″N 2°07′52″W	1853	Standing	120
Palm	Potts, Pickup &Dixon	SD914057 53°32′53″N 2°07′52″W	1884	1928*	42
Ram (Orb)	A H Stott; P S Stott	Gordon Street, SD896041 53°31′59″N 2°09′29″W	1907	Standing	64
Ramsey	F.W.Dixon	SD906042 53°32′02″N 2°08′35″W	1906	1979	28
Raven	P S Stott	SD903042 53°32′02″N 2°08′53″W	1907	Standing	52
Richmond	P S Stott	SD907034 53°31′37″N 2°08′31″W	1889	1976	43
Rose	P S Stott	SD904033 53°31′34″N 2°08′46″W	1885	2007	61
Rugby	F.W.Dixon	SD896039 53°31′55″N 2°09′29″W	1908	2014	77
Rushbank	J.Wild	SD906056 53°32′49″N 2°08′35″W	c1862	1974	
Spring (Shaw's)		SD905038 53°31′52″N 2°08′42″W	c1870	c1955	
Springbrook(e)			c1875	c1985	
Springfield Works		Lansdowne Road, SD895017 53°30′43″N 2°09′36″W	c1860	c1938	
Spring Vale		SD907056 53°32′49″N 2°08′31″W	c1865	1975	
Stockbrook		SD914057 53°32′53″N 2°07′52″W	1791	1869	
Stockfield	P S Stott	SD907052 53°32′35″N 2°08′31″W	1862	Standing	
Sun	T. Mitchell	SD908052 53°32′35″N 2°08′24″W	1861	1986*	98
Swan	E. Potts	SD890047 53°32′20″N 2°10′01″W	1875	Standing	84
Textile	Pott, Pickup & Dixon	SD908052 53°32′35″N 2°08′24″W	1882	1996	45
United	T Mitchell	SD909039 53°31′55″N 2°08′20″W	1874	1962	85
Vale		Stockfield Road, 53°32′35″N 2°08′17″W	c1860	1964*	
Victoria		Drury Lan, SD906031 53°31′26″N 2°08′35″W	c1854	1973	
Waverley		Milne St, 53°33′N 2°08′W	c1865	c1900	
Wren	FW Dixon	Milne St, 53°32′45″N 2°08′24″W	1901	c1970	36

== Failsworth ==
Name	Architect	Location	Built	Demolished	Served (Years)
Albert		Albert Street , SD 906 022 53°31′00″N 2°08′35″W	c.1850	Standing	
Albion Street / Clarke's		Albion Street, 53°30′25″N 2°09′43″W	c.1860		
Argyll	F.W. Dixon & Son	Holt Lane, 53°30′25″N 2°08′46″W	1907	1983	55
Bank		Ashton Road West , 53°30′31″N 2°09′30″W	1893	c.1955	41
Chatsworth		Albert Street , SD 906 022 53°30′56″N 2°08′33″W	c.1861	1972	
Cutler Hill / Hargreaves		Ashton Road East, 53°30′30″N 2°08′22″W	1887	1930s	
Dob Lane End		Morton Street , 53°30′18″N 2°10′32″W		Standing	
Dob Meadow		Hobson Street, 53°30′15″N 2°10′26″W	<1868	1916	
Failsworth		Ashton Road West , SD 895 013 53°30′28″N 2°09′36″W	1897	2014	62
Firs		Oldham Road , SD 896 015 53°30′37″N 2°09′25″W	1839	1974	102
German / Louvain		Louvain Street, 53°30′25″N 2°09′55″W	<1854	<1939	
Hope		Ashton Road West, 53°30′33″N 2°09′26″W	1874	1936	
Ivy	F.W. Dixon (1890 Extn)	Crown Street , SD 897 017 53°30′43″N 2°09′26″W	1883	Standing	51
Lime		Albert Street, SD 907 024 53°31′04″N 2°08′32″W	1874	>1998	60
Marlborough No.1	P.S. Stott	Mellor Street , SD 889 009 53°30′18″N 2°10′03″W	1905	Standing	50
Marlborough No.2	P.S. Stott	Poplar Street , SD 889 009 53°30′15″N 2°10′11″W	1908	2002	47
Morton		Morton Street , SD 884 010 53°30′18″N 2°10′33″W	1914	Standing	45
New Road		Cheetham Street , 53°30′49″N 2°09′01″W	<1838	1868	
Phoenix Mill		Cheetham Street , 53°30′49″N 2°09′01″W	1868	Standing	
Regent	George Stott	Oldham Road , SD 895 013 53°30′31″N 2°09′37″W	1906	Standing	120
Ridgefield	J. Wild	Ridgefield Street , 53°30′20″N 2°10′00″W	1875	1935	60
Union		Wrigley Head		1988	
Windsor/Rose		Hollins Road (Canal Street) , SD 905 024 53°31′05″N 2°08′39″W	1860	2016	
Wrigley Head		Wrigley Head Crescent , SD 897 019 53°30′48″N 2°09′24″W	1882	1988	77

== Royton ==
Name	Architect	Location	Built	Demolished	Served (Years)
Bee	Wild & Collins	Shaw Road, SD 926 075 53°33′51″N 2°06′46″W	1901	Standing	63
Beech		Chapel Street	<1838	1917	
Belgian		Blackshaw Lane	c.1862	1955	
Birchinlee		Off Middleton Road, SD 909 071 53°33′37″N 2°08′22″W	<1845		
Delta	Stotts & Sons	Crompton Street, SD 918 073 53°33′43″N 2°07′27″W	1902	Standing	77
Dogford		Low Crompton Road	c.1795	1861-1871	
Downey		Mill Street	<1838	<1939	
Elk	A. Turner & Son	Broadway, SD 911 068 53°33′31″N 2°08′11″W	1927	1999	71
Elly Clough		Holden Fold Lane	<1817	1930s	
Fields / Lees Hall		Holden Fold Lane	<1817	c.1950	
Fir	A.Turner	Highbarn Street, SD 923 079 53°34′03″N 2°07′03″W	1906	Standing	53
Grape	T.W. Jenkins	Crompton Street, SD 917 073 53°33′43″N 2°07′37″W	1906	Standing	57
Gravel Hole		Springfield Lane, 53°34′55″N 2°07′49″W	c.1870	>1959	
Hall Street / Top of the Fold		Fleet Street	1776-8	c.1900	
Holden Fold / Strange		Holden Fold Lane, SD 914 068, 53°33′29″N 2°07′51″W	1832	Standing	159
Holly	Wild, Collins & Wild	Flake Lane	1890	1957	67
Industry	E.Potts	Industry Street	1875	1930s	52
King	Wild, Collins & Wild	Crompton Street (now Shaw Road), 53°33′56″N 2°06′50″W	1897	1982	62
Lion	Wild, Collins & Wild	Fitton Street, SD 927 076 53°33′54″N 2°06′40″W	1890	Standing	77
Luzley Brook / Albion		Crompton Street (now Shaw Road)	<1776	1891	
Monarch	F.W. Dixon	Jones Street, SD 919 068	1903		74
Moss / Lamb / Rhos	1886 - Stotts & Sons	Higginshaw Lane, 53°33′35″N 2°06′11″W	1862	1975	113
Norman	P.S. Stott	Boundary Street	1887	>1931	44
Park and Sandy No.1		Sandy Lane	c.1850/1875	1960s	
Park and Sandy No.2	A.Turner	Schofield Street, SD 919 083 53°34′14″N 2°07′27″W	1913	2005	64
Park Lane / Vinegar		Park Lane	c.1844		
Park No.1 / Highfield	E.Potts	Bleasdale Street, SD 919 081 53°34′12″N 2°07′23″W	1876	1989	86
Park No.2	A.Turner	Bleasdale Street, SD 921 082 53°34′13″N 2°07′18″W	1912	2004	92
Parkside no.1		Edge Lane Street, 53°33′56″N 2°07′02″W	1872	1930s	56
Parkside No. 2	Stotts & Sons	Edge Lane Street, 53°33′56″N 2°07′02″W	1891	1983	90
Roy	P.S. Stott	Rochdale Road, 53°34′30″N 2°07′41″W	1906	1984	75
Royton		Mill Lane	<1891	c.1900	
Royton Lane / Lane End		Royton Lane (Now Middleton Road), SD 916 074 53°33′46″N 2°07′41″W	<1817	Standing	
Royton Ring	P.S. Stott	Industry Street (Now St. Phillips Drive), 53°33′17″N 2°07′09″W	1908	1992	58
Royton Spinning No.1	J. Wild	High Barn Street	1872	1961	86
Royton Spinning No.2	J. Mawson	High Barn Street	1883	1961	75
Sandy Lane		Sandy Lane	<1832		
Seville's		Sandy Lane		<1850	
Shiloh		Holden Fold Lane, 53°33′35″N 2°08′10″W	1789	1870	81
Shiloh No.1	J. Wild	Holden Fold Lane, 53°33′35″N 2°08′10″W	1876	1957	77
Shiloh No.1A		Holden Fold Lane, 53°33′35″N 2°08′10″W	1888	1957	65
Shiloh No.2	Wild, Collins & Wild	Holden Fold Lane, 53°33′35″N 2°08′10″W	1899-1901	1976	
Spaw / Spa / Owler	1866 Extn: J. Wild	Mill Lane	<1838	>1959	
Springfield		Moss Lane, 53°33′40″N 2°06′08″W	1869	1962	85
Springhill		Middleton Road	c.1830	1930	
Star	J.Wild	Edge Lane Street, 53°33′57″N 2°06′59″W	1874	1929	55
Thornham No.1	J. Wild	Oozewood Road, SD 914 086	1874	1962	88
Thornham No.2	J. Mawson	Oozewood Road, 53°34′25″N 2°07′49″W	1885	Standing	141
Thorp		Thorp Clough 53°33′58″N 2°08′09″W	1764	>1792	24
Travis		Holden Fold Lane, 53°33′35″N 2°08′10″W	<1838	1897	
Turf Lane		Turf Lane, 53°33′45″N 2°06′28″W	1874	1960s	56
Union		Union Street	<1827	>1896	
Vine	Wild, Collins & Wild	Middleton Road, 53°33′46″N 2°07′39″W	1897	Standing	129
Woodstock New Mill	Wild & Collins	Meek Street	1884		50
Woodstock Old Mill		Meek Street	1873	1939	61

== Saddleworth ==
Name	Architect	Location	Built	Demolished	Served (Years)
Albion Mill		Uppermill			
Alexandra Mill		Uppermill, 53°32′47″N 2°00′22″W		Standing	
Bailey Mill		Delph, 53°33′40″N 2°01′24″W		Standing	
Brownhill Bridge Mill		Dobcross New Road		Standing	
Dam Head Mill		Uppermill			
Lumb Mill		Huddersfield Road, Delph			
Oak View Mills		Manchester Road, Greenfield , 53°31′59″N 2°00′32″W		Standing	
Shore Mill		Delph , 53°34′05″N 2°01′21″W	1780s	Standing	
Victoria Mill		Uppermill			
Willow Bank Mill		Station Road, Uppermill, 53°32′55″N 2°00′14″W		Standing	

== Shaw and Crompton ==
Name	Architect	Location	Built	Demolished	Served (Years)
Ash	Wild & Collins	Jubilee Street, 53°34′40″N 2°05′07″W	1883	1985	102
Beal		Beal Lane, 53°34′38″N 2°05′28″W	<1832	c.1875	
Beal	Joseph Stott	George Street, 53°34′57″N 2°05′09″W	1889	1933	44
Briar	Philip Sydney Stott	Beal Lane, 53°34′34″N 2°05′20″W	1906	standing	120
Brook / Crompton Fold		Location, 53°35′11″N 2°04′43″W	c.1790	c.1852	
Cape	P.S. Stott	Refuge Street, 53°34′24″N 2°05′38″W	1900	1993	93
Clough		Mark Lane, 53°34′35″N 2°05′09″W	1800	1990	190
Clough		Mark Lane, 53°34′35″N 2°05′03″W	1835	1934	99
Cocker / Diamond Rope Works		Cocker Mill Lane, 53°34′11″N 2°06′32″W	<1832	1994	
Cowlishaw / Victoria		Scowcroft Lane, 53°34′21″N 2°06′12″W	<1789	1940	
Dawn	P.S. Stott	Eastway, SD 940,089 53°34′37″N 2°05′31″W	1901	2006	105
Dee	P.S. Stott	Cheetham Street, 53°34′43″N 2°05′09″W	1907	1984	77
Duchess	Wild & Collins	Location, 53°35′09″N 2°05′36″W	1884	1960	76
Duke	Joseph Stott	Refuge Street, 53°34′29″N 2°05′34″W	1883	standing	143
Elm / Newby	Joseph Stott	Linney Lane, (Lyonney Lane)53°34′52″N 2°05′09″W	1890	2022	132
Fern	Joseph Stott	Siddall Street, 53°34′48″N 2°05′35″W	1884	1983	99
Greenfield		Greenfield Lane	1776	1945	169
Hawk	A. Turner	Store Street, 53°34′53″N 2°05′32″W	1908	1991	83
Laneside		Grains Road	1817	>1875	
Lilac	P.S. Stott	Beal Lane, 53°34′34″N 2°05′20″W	1918	standing	108
Lily (No.1)	G. Stott	Linney Lane, 53°34′47″N 2°05′18″W	1904	2023	119
Lily (No.2)	G. Stott	Linney Lane, 53°34′47″N 2°05′11″W	1918	2023	105
Lyon		Location, 53°34′31″N 2°05′51″W	<1852	1929	
Moorfield	Joseph Stott	Durden Street, 53°34′36″N 2°05′43″W	1876	1974	98
Moss Hey / Ivor		Beal Lane , 53°34′27″N 2°05′26″W	<1789	1972	
New Mill		Rochdale Road, 53°34′57″N 2°06′44″W	1846	1884	38
New Mill (rebuilt)		Rochdale Road, 53°34′57″N 2°06′44″W	1884	1926	42
Old Brox		Rochdale Road, 53°34′56″N 2°06′35″W	1789	1819	30
Old Brox (Rebuilt)		Rochdale Road, 53°34′56″N 2°06′35″W	1819	1906	87
Oak / Tom Taylors		Moor Street, 53°34′24″N 2°06′02″W	1863	1937	74
Park		Milnrow Road, 53°35′14″N 2°05′13″W	1834	1991	157
Rutland	F.W. Dixon & Son	Linney Lane, 53°34′51″N 2°05′15″W	1907	1993	86
Sandy Lane		Rochdale Road, 53°34′45″N 2°05′48″W	>1863	1975	
Sandy Lane (No.2)		Rochdale Road, 53°34′45″N 2°05′48″W	>1878	1975	
Shaw Edge		Location	>1818	<1845	
Shaw Lane		High Street	>1844	1900	
Shaw Mill		Newtown, SD 940,089 53°34′37″N 2°05′31″W	1820	>1890	
Shaw Spinning	J. Wild	Salts Street, 53°34′53″N 2°05′32″W	1875	1972	97
Shaw Side / Irk		Oldham Road, 53°34′16″N 2°05′52″W	<1832	>1980	
Smallbrook	J. Wild	Nolan Street 53°35′06″N 2°05′30″W	1875	1964	89
Springhill		Thornham Road, 53°34′52″N 2°06′44″W	1846	1938	92
Trent	F.W. Dixon & Son	Duchess Street, 53°35′09″N 2°05′48″W	1908	1967–1969	
Vale / Crompton Spinning Co.		Beal Lane, 53°34′40″N 2°05′20″W	1861	1934	73
Woodend		Smallbrook Road, 53°35′15″N 2°05′21″W	>1838	1920	
Wye	A. Turner & Son	Napier Street, 53°35′07″N 2°05′52″W	1914	1974	60
Wye (No.2)	A. Turner & Son	Napier Street, 53°35′07″N 2°05′57″W	1925	1974	49

== See also ==
- List of mills in Oldham
- Textile mills in the Metropolitan Borough of Oldham
- Lists of mills in Greater Manchester
- Lists of textile mills in the United Kingdom
