= List of mills in Oldham =

This list of mills in Oldham, lists textile factories that have existed in the town of Oldham, within Metropolitan Borough of Oldham in Greater Manchester, England.

From the Industrial Revolution until the 20th century, Oldham was a major centre of textile manufacture, particularly cotton spinning. During this period, the valleys of the River Beal, River Irk, River Medlock and their tributaries were dominated by large rectangular brick-built factories, many of which still remain today as warehouses or converted for residential or retail use.

== A–E ==
Name	Architect	Location	Built	Demolished	Served (Years)
Abbey / Neville Mill	A.H. Stott	Neville Street	1875	1936	59
	Notes: Built by Abbey Mill Spinning Company, renamed between 1884 and 1889 as Neville Mill. Extended in 1891.				
Ace	P.S.Stott	Hollinwood SD897037 53°31′48″N 2°09′25″W	1914	Standing	53
	Notes:				
Acorn Mill		Lees			
	Notes: Now housing				
Albert Mills		Derker		2010	
	Notes: Demolished in 2009/10 for Housing Market Renewal				
Albion		Bradshaw Street, Oldham	1884	1938	
Anchor	J. Stott	Featherstall Road North, Westwood 53°32′39″N 2°07′43″W	1881	Standing	144
	Notes: 5 storey iron frame and brick, 18 bays by 6 bays, with internal engine house with and upright shaft transmission; but external boiler house 1891 Anchor Spinning Co Limited, 53,136 spindles, 201/50, twist, 308/701 weft Grade II listed building.No. 1282545				
Asia Mill		Clayton Street, Hollinwood			
	Notes: Acquired by Fine Spinners and Doublers in 1954.				
Athens Mill		Lees Brook SD9504	1905	>1982	
	Notes: Built 1905, suffered fire damage early 1980s and demolished several years later				
Bank Top Mill		Salem			
	Notes: Now housing				
Belgrave	Potts, Pickup and Dixon	Hathershaw	1885	Standing	127
	Notes: Prominent in the history of Bagley & Wright, used for sewing cotton. Later owned by Platt & Hill. The company bought land off Honeywell Lane, Oldham and erected Belgrave Mill in 1880s which subsequently became known as 'Belgrave Number 1 Mill' as a further three mills were erected on the site in the early part of the 20th century. Yarn produced at the Belgrave Number 1 Mill was bleached or dyed in an on-site facility. Belgrave No. 1 was designed by the architects Potts, Pickup and Dixon. Engine by Woolstenhulmes & Rye.				
Bell		Claremont St, Oldham	1904	Standing	121
	Notes: 1904 Bell Mill Co Ltd; 1957 Ceased production				
Broadway Mill	Joseph Stott	Goddard St & Scottfield Rd	1875	1964	89
	Notes: Enlarged 1890 and 1896, production ceased in March 1936; it was later used as a warehouse. Burned on 28 March 1964 (Easter Saturday). Goddard St wall was demolished on Easter Sunday by Connell & Finnegan to prevent it falling outward onto the street and houses. The remainder was demolished over the following weeks. The northwest corner tower was demolished with explosives. The first charge was inadequate and a second charge had to be used. The chimney was the last structure to be demolished. The lodge (cooling water pond) was un-fenced and at least one person drowned in it. In the early 1960s the police and fire brigade used boats from nearby Alexandra Park in the search for a missing boy; the body of a teen age boy was recovered.				
Brook		Hollins		2010	
	Notes: Named 'Trendsetter' when the company moved there. Demolished in 2010 to make way for Oasis academy.				
Cairo	P. S. Stott	Greenacres Road, Waterhead 53°32′53″N 2°04′30″W		Standing	
	Notes:				
Coldhurst Mill		Rochdale Rd, Coldhurst	1876	1974	86
	Notes: Extended in 1884, 1914 and 1922. 1891-Coldhurst Cotton Spinning Co, Limited, Coldhurst Mill, Rochdale road; 61,308 spindles, 508 twist,701 weft. Closed in 1962 but was used to store goods until 1967. After being left empty it was demolished in 1974 to make way for extensions to Boundary Park Hospital.				
Cromford Mill		Derker			
Derker Mills		Derker			
	Notes: 1891-James Greaves, (and velvet manufacturer), Derker Mills, Derker Street; 107,000 spindles, medium counts; 1,590 looms. Replaced with industrial units for Glyn Webb/Ferranti.				
Devon Mill	George Stott	Hollins	1908	Standing	117
	Notes: Cast-iron and steel-framed with brick walls. 4 storeys and basement, 36 bays by 10 with corner stair towers with raised parapets. Flat roof. Grade II listed building.No. 1210051				
Dowry Mill		Lees/Waterhead (Turner St)			
	Notes: 1891-Dowry Spinning Co, Limited, Dowry Mill, Waterhead; 66,760 spindles, 308/408 twist, 401/508 weft.				
Durban Mill		Hollins Rd, Hollinwood 53°31′28″N 2°07′52″W	1905	2015	110
	Notes: Demolished in 2015 to make way for housing.				
Earl Mill	P.S.Stott	Dowry St/Ashton Rd, Hathershaw	1860 (rebuilt 1891)	Standing	
	Notes: 1891 Earl Spinning Co Ltd				

== F–J ==
Name	Architect	Location	Built	Demolished	Served (Years)
Fox Mill		Hollins			
	Notes: Now housing				
Glen Mill		Wellyhole St	1903	1970	35
	Notes: Ceased spinning cotton in 1938 and was then used as prisoner of war camp until 1947.				
Granville Mill		Derker		1997	
	Notes: Fire in 1997				
Greenacres Mill		Littlemoor			
	Notes: Now Littlemoor Junior School				
Greenbank Mills		Glodwick Road/Greengate Street			
Gresham Mill		Westwood			
	Notes: Burnt down				
Hartford Mill	F.W.Dixon	Werneth	1907	2020	52
	Notes: Built 1907 by the Hartford Mill (Oldham)Co Ltd. Extended 1920 and 1924. Closed 1959 and used by Littlewoods as a mail order warehouse until 1992. Architect was F.W.Dixon, there were 120,000 spindles and power was provided by a very impressive 1500 hp Urmson & Thompson engine. Demolished for Housing Market Renewal; Grade II listed building.No. 1210026				
Heron		Hollins		Standing	
	Notes: Ceased production 1960				
Holroyd Mill		Waterhead			
	Notes: Replaced by Orb Mill				
Holyrood Mill		Higginshaw		1961	
	Notes: Fire in 1961				
Honeywell Mill		Hathershaw	1874	1955	81
	Notes: Fire in 1955				
Iris Mill		Hathershaw	1907		118
	Notes: Closed 1962, later used by Thomas Glover and Co to manufacture fire extinguishers.				

== K–O ==
Name	Architect	Location	Built	Demolished	Served (Years)
Leesbrook	Stott	Lees	1884	Standing	141
	Notes: Cast-iron columns and steel beams carrying brick arches, externally, brick with multi-ridge slate roof four storeys and basement of 21 bays extended by four bays. Grade II listed building.No. 1253536				
Littlemoor Mill		Littlemoor		Standing	
Lowerhey Mill		Lees			
	Notes: Replaced with Hey Junior School				
Majestic	F.W. Dixon	Greenacres Road, Waterhead 53°32′52″N 2°04′23″W	1903	Standing	79
	Notes: ceased production 1982				
Maple 1	P.S.Stott	Hathershaw, 53°31′34″N 2°06′26″W	1904	2016	112
	Notes: It was designed as a double mill by P.S. Stott, in 1904. The first mill was built then and the second mill in 1915. It worked as a mule spinning mill. It was taken over by Fine Spinners and Doublers in 1954. It was partly destroyed by fire in 2016 prompting its full demolition for safety reasons.				
Maple 2	P.S.Stott	Hathershaw SD9303 53°31′34″N 2°06′26″W	1915	2009	94
	Notes: Was built as an addition to the existing Maple Mill in 1915. The building was destroyed by fire in 2009. Some sections, including the tower remain standing.				
Orb Mill		Waterhead 53°33′02″N 2°04′19″W			
	Notes: Site now used for Waterhead Academy				
Orme	F.W. Dixon	Greenacres Road, Waterhead 53°32′52″N 2°04′26″W	1910	Standing	50
	Notes:				
Owl Mill		Lees			
	Notes: Now housing				

== P–T ==
Name	Architect	Location	Built	Demolished	Served (Years)
Prince of Wales Mill		Derker	1875	1993	118
	Notes: Later used by Slumberland to manufacture beds, the site is now industrial units				
Rome Mill		Springhead, Lees	1907	1992	85
	Notes: Built by the Rome Mill Co Ltd. Later used for the manufacture of wallpaper from 1932 to 1990. Now housing.				
Royd		Hollins SD 53°31′38″N 2°07′58″W		2015	
	Notes: The four tall arched windows mark the engine house that contained a J & E Wood inverted vertical triple expansion engine. The open doors in front mark the boiler house that contained a row of Lancashire boilers. It ceased production 1981. It was demolished in 2015 to make way for a housing scheme.				
Ruby Mill		Littlemoor			
	Notes: Part of Littlemoor Estate				
Springhey Mill		Waterhead			
Tay Mill		Higginshaw			

== U–Z ==
Name	Architect	Location	Built	Demolished	Served (Years)
Vale Mill		Chapel Road, Oldham 53°31′32″N 2°08′09″W	1868	Standing	78
	Notes: Extended twice — in 1882 and 1920. Was used for a wallpapering business which left the building in 2006. Refurbished in 2008 as the Chambers Business Centre				
Werneth Mill		Featherstall Rd North, Werneth 53°33′00″N 2°07′20″W		Standing	
	Notes: 1891 Daniel Dronsfield, 44,000 spindles, 108/608 twist and weft and 840 looms				

== See also ==
- List of mills in the Metropolitan Borough of Oldham
- Textile mills in the Metropolitan Borough of Oldham
- Lists of mills in Greater Manchester
- Lists of textile mills in the United Kingdom
