= Malta Mill, Middleton =

Cotton mill in Greater Manchester, England

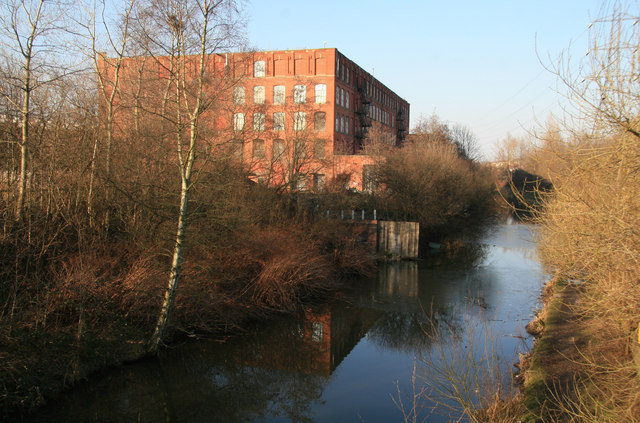

- Location in Greater Manchester

Spinning (mule twist mill)
- Location: Chadderton, Greater Manchester, England
- Serving canal: Rochdale Canal
- Serving railway: Lancashire and Yorkshire Railway
- Owner: Malta Mill Company
- Further ownership: Lancashire Cotton Corporation (1930s)
- Coordinates: 53.5481°N 2.1692°W

Construction
- Completed: 1904

Design team
- Architect: Frederick Dixon

Power
- Date: 1904
- Engine maker: Buckley & Taylor
- Decommissioned: 1963
- Engine type: Vertical triple expansion engine
- Valve Gear: Corliss valves on all cylinders
- Cylinder diameter and throw: 20"HP, 32"IP, 52"LP X 4ft stroke
- rpm: 72rpm
- Installed horse power (ihp): 1,200
- Flywheel diameter: 22 ft (6.7 m)
- Transmission type: Rope
- No. of ropes: 32

Boiler configuration
- Boilers: Twin Lancashire, coal fired
- Pressure: 160psi

Equipment
- Mule Frames: Twist

Malta Mill, Middleton is a former cotton spinning mill in the Mills Hill area of Chadderton, Greater Manchester, England. It lies alongside the Rochdale Canal. It was built in 1904 as a new mule mill, by F. W. Dixon. The engine stopped in 1963. The building still stands.

Prior to 1933 boundary changes, the mill lay within Middleton.

== History ==
Historically a part of Lancashire, Middleton took its name from being situated in the centre of several circumjacent settlements. In 1770, Middleton was a village of 20 houses; during the 18th and 19th centuries it grew into a thriving and populous seat of textile manufacture, so much so that Middleton was granted borough status in 1886.

During the Middle Ages, Middleton was a centre of domestic flannel and woollen cloth production. Industrial scale textile manufacture was introduced to Middleton as a result of the Industrial Revolution. Middleton became a centre for silk production in the 18th century, which developed into a cotton spinning industry by the mid-19th century and which continued through to the mid-20th century. Rochdale rose to prominence during the 19th century as a major mill town and centre for textile manufacture during the Industrial Revolution. It was a boomtown of the Industrial Revolution, and amongst the first ever industrialised towns. The Rochdale Canal—one of the major navigable broad canals of the United Kingdom—was a highway of commerce during this time used for the haulage of cotton, wool, coal to and from the area. In 1882 Rochdale became the home of industrial co-operatives, embraced the joint stock limited company and new mills were financed and built. Its ownership model was slightly different from that of Oldham, and more shares remained in the hands of the operatives. The Rochdale Limiteds were some of the first to adopt ring spinning.

Malta Mill was one of a cluster of mills built in 1904–05.

The industry peaked in 1912 when it produced 8 billion yards of cloth. World War I halted the supply of raw cotton, and the British government encouraged its colonies to build mills to spin and weave cotton. Following the war, Lancashire never regained its markets. The independent mills were struggling. The Bank of England set up the Lancashire Cotton Corporation in 1929 to attempt to rationalise and save the industry. Malta Mill was one of 104 mills bought by the LCC, and one of the 53 mills that survived through to 1950. The mill closed in 1963.

Malta Mill still stands in 2010 and is used by many businesses; including for document storage and as a bonded warehouse.

== Architecture ==
The mill was designed by F. W. Dixon and built in 1905. It is a substantial building made of Accrington brick.

=== Power ===
Driven by a 1,200 hp vertical triple expansion engine by Buckley & Taylor, 1904. It had a 22-foot (6.7 m) flywheel, 32 ropes operating at 72rpm. Its cylinders, 20"HP, 32"IP, 52"LP, had a 4 ft stroke. It was steamed at 160psi. 72rpm. 22 ft flywheel, 32 ropes. Corliss valves on all cylinders. The air pump was driven from LP crosshead. It had an eight bearing crankshaft.

=== Equipment ===
110,160 mule spindles in 1915.

== Owners ==
- Malta Mill Company
- Lancashire Cotton Corporation (1930s–1963)

== See also ==
- Textile manufacturing

== Bibliography ==
- Dunkerley, Philip (2009). "Dunkerley-Tuson Family Website, The Regent Cotton Mill, Failsworth". Archived from the original on 23 March 2008.
- LCC (1951). The mills and organisation of the Lancashire Cotton Corporation Limited. Blackfriars House, Manchester: Lancashire Cotton Corporation Limited.
- Roberts, A S (1921), "Arthur Robert's Engine List", Arthur Roberts Black Book., One guy from Barlick-Book Transcription, archived from the original on 23 July 2011
- Williams, Mike; Farnie, Douglas Anthony (1992). Cotton Mills of Greater Manchester. Carnegie Publishing. ISBN 0-948789-69-7.
