= Derker =

Coordinates: 53.549°N 2.0973°W

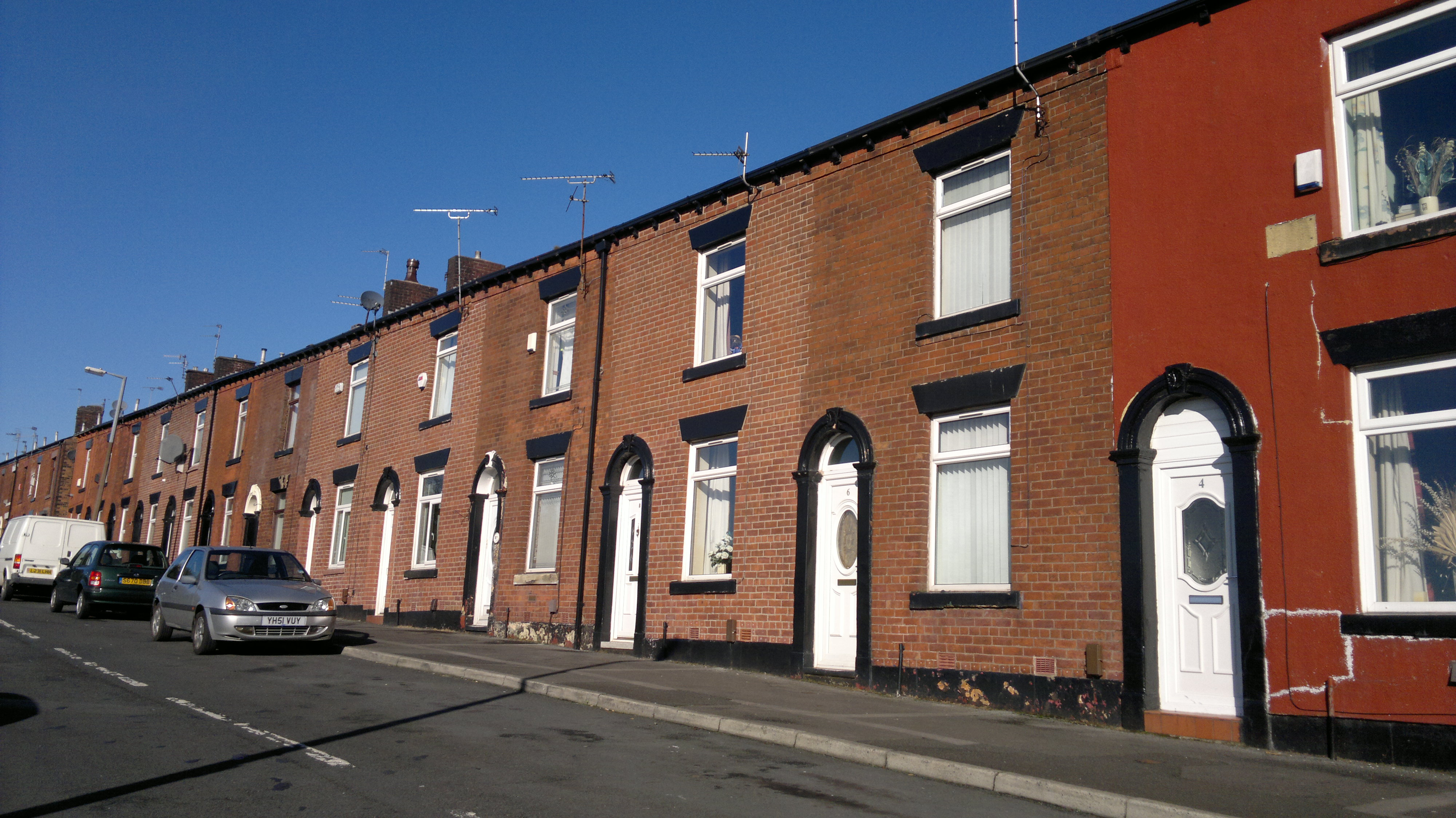
- Afghan Street, in Derker

- Location within Greater Manchester
- OS grid reference: SD935058
- Metropolitan borough: Oldham
- Metropolitan county: Greater Manchester
- Region: North West
- Country: England
- Sovereign state: United Kingdom
- Post town: OLDHAM
- Postcode district: OL1
- Dialling code: 0161
- Police: Greater Manchester
- Fire: Greater Manchester
- Ambulance: North West
- UK Parliament: Oldham East and Saddleworth

Derker is an area of Oldham, in Greater Manchester, England, originally part of Lancashire. It lies in north-central Oldham, close to the boundary with Royton.

== History ==
Historically a part of Lancashire, Derker was recorded as a place of residence in 1604 with the name Dirtcar. During the Industrial Revolution, Derker sprouted 5 mills; 4 of which were cotton, which brought with it terraced housing to house the workers of these mills. A number of these early houses had fallen into a state of disrepair prompting the Housing Market Renewal Initiative. These houses were compulsorily purchased, and demolished, and, as of 2019, have yet to be replaced.

Granville Mill met a sour end when it was destroyed by fire in 1999. All of the mills have now been demolished either as a part of the housing market renewal scheme or converted into industrial units.

In the 2000s, Derker had terraced houses "unsuited to modern needs" according to the Housing Market Renewal Initiative. This was opposed and legally challenged by local residents. who have lobbied Parliament to protest at the demolitions. The then local MP Phil Woolas opposed the demolitions.

In 2008 the challenge was rejected, and plans to begin regeneration took place. However, with the switch to the Conservative government in 2010, the funding for the Housing Market Renewal Initiative ceased. But as of 2012 private funding was sought by Oldham Council and plans to start building houses in Derker were announced in 2012, with the contract being awarded to Keepmoat housing. As of 2023, these houses have still yet to be built.

== Geography ==
Derker is next to the Greenacres, Higginshaw and Mumps areas of Oldham. It is approximately 1 mile away from Oldham town centre, and 4 miles away from the picturesque villages of Saddleworth.

== Transport ==
Bee Network's 411 service runs an hourly circular between Oldham Bus Station and the top of Derker between 6am and midnight with gaps in the timetable on weekdays to allow interworking with a school service, on weekends service starts at 8:30am. As well as this, the Metrolink station, Derker Metrolink Station, which opened in December 2012. The station was a former railway station, part of the Oldham Loop Line that was decommissioned in 2009 to make way for the new Metrolink system.

== Recreation ==
Stoneleigh Park is a public park occupying about nine hectares. The site has ornamental gardens and sports facilities, with a pavilion, a playground, two bowling greens and tennis courts, as well as a senses garden, teen shelters and floodlit multi-games courts. The site was bought by Oldham Council in 1933 and opened as a public park in 1938. It has regularly won Green Flag Awards since 2001.

Friends of Stoneleigh Park, originally set up in 1992, was reformed in 2007 through a partnership involving Groundwork Oldham and Rochdale, Community Links and a committed group of residents.

The park facilities listed are;

- Bowling green
- Tennis court
- Football pitch
- 2 rugby pitches
- Sensory garden
- Playground
- Floodlit multi games courts
- Ornamental gardens
- Toilets
- Sandpit

Derker is home to the gym of former super middleweight boxer Eric Noi who was nominated in 2010 for BeMOBO award for his work in the community and is also home to Oldham Cricket Club who play in the Central Lancashire Cricket League.

== Notable people ==
Bernard Cribbins, an English actor, was born in Derker.
