= Magnet Mill, Chadderton =

Cotton Mill in Greater Manchester, England

- Location in Greater Manchester

Spinning (ring mill)
- Current status: Closed, 1966
- Location: Chadderton, Oldham, Greater Manchester, England
- Serving canal: Rochdale Canal
- Owner: Magnet Mill Ltd.
- Further ownership: Lancashire Cotton Corporation (1935); Courtaulds (1964)
- Coordinates: 53.5378°N 2.1461°W

Construction
- Completed: 1902

Design team
- Architect: F.W.Dixon

Power
- Date: 1902
- Engine maker: George Saxon & Co
- Engine type: twin tandem compound engine
- Valve Gear: Corliss valves
- Cylinder diameter and throw: Two 20"HP and two 44"LP 9front) X 5ft stroke.
- rpm: 64½
- Installed horse power (ihp): 2200hp
- Flywheel diameter: 27ft
- Transmission type: rope
- No. of ropes: 35

Boiler configuration
- Pressure: 160psi

Equipment
- Manufacturer: Howard & Bullough
- Mule Frames: 60,156 spindles (1915)
- Ring Frames path: 44,680 spindles (1915)

Magnet Mill, Chadderton is a cotton spinning mill in Chadderton, Oldham, Greater Manchester. It was built by the Magnet Mill Ltd. in 1902, but purchased by the Lancashire Cotton Corporation in 1935. It was later taken over by the Courtaulds Group. Ceasing textile production in December 1966, it was demolished soon after. A suburban residential estate now occupies this site. It was driven by a 2200 hp twin tandem compound engine by George Saxon & Co, Openshaw, 1903. It had a 27-foot flywheel with 35 ropes, operating at 64½ rpm.

== Location ==
Oldham is a large town in Greater Manchester, England. It lies amongst the Pennines on elevated ground between the rivers Irk and Medlock, 5.3 miles (8.5 km) south-southeast of Rochdale, and 6.9 miles (11.1 km) northeast of the city of Manchester. Oldham is surrounded by several smaller settlements which together form the Metropolitan Borough of Oldham; Chadderton and Hollinwood are such settlements. Chadderton and Hollinwood are served by the Rochdale Canal and the Hollinwood Branch Canal. A rail service was provided by the Oldham Loop Line that was built by the Lancashire and Yorkshire Railway.

== History ==
Oldham rose to prominence during the 19th century as an international centre of textile manufacture. It was a boomtown of the Industrial Revolution, and amongst the first ever industrialised towns, rapidly becoming "one of the most important centres of cotton and textile industries in England", spinning Oldham counts, the coarser counts of cotton. Oldham's soils were too thin and poor to sustain crop growing, and so for decades prior to industrialisation the area was used for grazing sheep, which provided the raw material for a local woollen weaving trade. It was not until the last quarter of the 18th century that Oldham changed from being a cottage industry township producing woollen garments via domestic manual labour, to a sprawling industrial metropolis of textile factories. The first mill, Lees Hall, was built by William Clegg in about 1778. Within a year, 11 other mills had been constructed, but by 1818 there were only 19 of these privately owned mills.

It was in the second half of the 19th century, that Oldham became the world centre for spinning cotton yarn. This was due in a large part to the formation of limited liability companies known as Oldham Limiteds. In 1851, over 30% of Oldham's population was employed within the textile sector, compared to 5% across Great Britain. At its zenith, it was the most productive cotton spinning mill town in the world. By 1871 Oldham had more spindles than any country in the world except the United States, and in 1909, was spinning more cotton than France and Germany combined. By 1911 there were 16.4 million spindles in Oldham, compared with a total of 58 million in the United Kingdom and 143.5 million in the world; in 1928, with the construction of the UK's largest textile factory Oldham reached its manufacturing zenith. At its peak, there were over 360 mills, operating night and day;

The industry peaked in 1912 when it produced 8 billion yards of cloth. The Great War of 1914–18 halted the supply of raw cotton, and the British government encouraged its colonies to build mills to spin and weave cotton. The war over, Lancashire never regained its markets. The independent mills were struggling. The Bank of England set up the Lancashire Cotton Corporation in 1929 to attempt to rationalise and save the industry. Magnet Mill, Chadderton was one of 104 mills bought by the LCC, and one of the 53 mills that survived through to 1950.

== Architecture ==
This was a F.W.Dixon Mill, built in 1902.

=== Power ===
It was driven by a 2200 hp twin tandem compound engine by George Saxon & Co, Openshaw, 1903. It had a 27-foot flywheel with 35 ropes, operating at 64½ rpm The-two 20"HP and two 44"LP cylinders had a 5 ft stroke. All had Corliss valves. There were no tail rods but semi-circular supports to piston rods between each pair of cylinders. The air pumps were driven from each crosshead. The boiler produced steam at 160psi.

=== Equipment ===
In 1915 there were 60,156 mule spindles, and 44,680 ring spindles supplied by Howard & Bullough.

== Owners ==
- Magnet Mill Ltd (1902–1935)
- Lancashire Cotton Corporation (1935–1964)
- Courtaulds (1964–c. 1966)

== See also ==
- Textile manufacturing

== Bibliography ==
- Dunkerley, Philip (2009). "Dunkerley-Tuson Family Website, The Regent Cotton Mill, Failsworth". Archived from the original on 23 March 2008.
- Gurr, Duncan; Hunt, Julian (1998). The Cotton Mills of Oldham. Oldham Education & Leisure. ISBN 0-902809-46-6. Archived from the original on 18 July 2011.
- LCC (1951). The mills and organisation of the Lancashire Cotton Corporation Limited. Blackfriars House, Manchester: Lancashire Cotton Corporation Limited.
- Roberts, A S (1921), "Arthur Robert's Engine List", Arthur Roberts Black Book., One guy from Barlick-Book Transcription, archived from the original on 23 July 2011
