= Buckley & Taylor =

British engineering company

- Industry: Engineering
- Founded: 1861
- Founder: Samuel Buckley, James Taylor
- Defunct: 1947 (Take over)
- Successor: Brightside Foundry and engineering Co. Ltd., Sheffield
- Headquarters: Oldham
- Number of locations: 1 (Castle Ironworks, Greenacres)
- Products: Stationary steam engines
- Owner: 1861- Samuel Buckley, James Taylor

Buckley & Taylor was a British engineering company that manufactured stationary steam engines. It was the largest firm of engine makers in Oldham, Lancashire, England. The company produced large steam-driven engines for textile mills in Oldham and exported to India, Holland and Brazil.

== History ==
Buckley & Taylor started business in 1861 to manufacture beam, horizontal and vertical mill engines and gearing. It began producing mill engines by 1867. Many of their early engines were large compound beam engines. By 1870 they had established a reputation for horizontal twin tandem compounds. Their original 1/2-acre (0.20 ha) site at the Castle Ironworks at Green acres expanded to 3 acres (1.2 ha) in 1880, and they operated a forge at Openshaw. In 1890 they were employing 400 men. They built their last engine in 1926. Through Buckley, the firm had a close relationship with the Oldham Boiler Works Ltd. It also often partnered with another Oldham company, Platt Bros, to produce main drives and spinning machines for mills.

Samuel Buckley was born in November 1837 at Hey, Lees, to a mule spinner. He started work in a mill at the age of six. While working he got an education and studied engineering. Before he was twenty he had been appointed chief engineer at Castle Mill and Lowerhouse Mill. He had an interest in politics and was Mayor of Oldham on three occasions: 1883/4 1889/90 and 1890/1. James Taylor was born in 1838 at Shaw, and served an apprenticeship with Woolstenhulmes & Rye. Both men were engineers, though it was Taylor who dealt with the practical details, and Buckley conducted the commercial side of the business. In 1861, the company’s Castle Ironworks was established in Oldham. On Taylor's death, Buckley managed the business alone. It was incorporated in 1902; and Taylor's son William took control. It was taken over by the Brightside Foundry, general engineers of Sheffield in 1947, but continued to operate under its own name.

=== Horizontal twin tandem ===
These were 'standard' mill engines preferred by the Oldham Limiteds. An early example was the 1,000-ihp engine delivered to the North Moor spinning company in 1876. The design was conservative, using slide valves and spur wheel gear drive transmission. They did start to fit Corliss valves and rope drives in 1883, but these didn't become standard until the 1890s. An example of such an engine was the 2,000-ihp, horizontal twin tandem triple expansion delivered to Pearl Mill in 1892.

Buckley & Taylor expanded in India sometime in 1865 after it partnered with Platt Bros to build drives and spinning machines for a jute mill in Bombay and, later, in Narayanganj.

=== Beam Engines ===
During the 1890s Buckley & Taylor revived the beam engine, building at least 11 engines using designs of JH Tattersall, a consulting engineer from Preston. The two identical engines, twin beam triple expansion engines, built for Nile Mill and Tay Mill were the biggest ever beam engine installed in a cotton mill. They delivered 2,500 ihp and cost over £10,000

=== Marine type mill engines ===
Inverted vertical engines, known commonly as marine type engines, needed less space to operate. From about 1899 Buckley & Taylor started to specialise in this type of engine. Starting with an engine for Don Mill, Middleton, they built 29 of these engines from 1899 to 1916 with a total capacity of 33,000 ihp. They provided a marine type vertical triple expansion engines to Regent Mill, Failsworth, in 1906. It was the largest they built; with 1,800 installed horsepower. The engine had a 63-inch-diameter (1,600 mm) low-pressure cylinder. It was sometimes loaded to 2,000 ihp. It ran until 1958, when it was scrapped. It ran 60,000 spindles. There was a 26-foot (7.9 m) flywheel, 26 ropes operated at 64 rpm.

The company’s steam engines were also preferred by the mills and factories in Brazil. In Minas Gerais, for example, its engines were preferred by these establishments prior to World War I before the transition to electricity in the 1920s.

== Mills driven by their engines ==
Between 1861 and 1926 Buckley & Taylor built more than 200 mill engines with a total capacity of over 160,000 ihp. Arthur Roberts details 26 in his black book. This list is representative rather than complete.

- Sun Mill, Chadderton.1867
- Lees & Wrigley No.3. Mill, Glodwick 1875
- Pearl Mill, Oldham 1878
- Nile Mill
- Tay Mill
- Don Mill, Middleton 1901
- Regent Mill, Failsworth 1906
- Orb Mill, Waterhead 1908
- Wye No.2 Mill, Shaw 1926
