= Textile Mill, Chadderton =

Cotton mill in Greater Manchester, England

- The mill before 1951

- Location in Greater Manchester

Spinning (ring mill)
- Location: Cobden St, Chadderton, Oldham, Greater Manchester, England.
- Serving railway: Oldham Loop Line
- Further ownership: Lancashire Cotton Corporation (1930s); Courtaulds (1964)
- Coordinates: 53.5431°N 2.1404°W

Design team
- Architecture Firm: Potts, Pickup & Dixon

Power
- Engine maker: Hick, Hargreaves & Co.
- Installed horse power (ihp): 1300 hp

Equipment
- Manufacturer: Platt Brothers
- Ring Frames path: 98,436 spindles (1915)

Textile Mill, Chadderton was a cotton spinning mill in Chadderton, Lancashire, England. It was built in 1882 by Potts, Pickup & Dixon for the Textile Mill Co. Ltd, and closed in 1927. It was taken over by the Lancashire Cotton Corporation in the late 1940s and passed to Courtaulds in 1964 and used for cotton waste sorting. Half of the building was destroyed by fire on 11 July 1950, but the remaining section continued to be used for cotton waste sorting by W. H. Holt and Son until 1988.

== Location ==
Oldham is a large town in North of England Greater Manchester, England. It lies amongst the Pennines on elevated ground between the rivers Irk and Medlock, 5.3 miles (8.5 km) south-southeast of Rochdale, and 6.9 miles (11.1 km) northeast of the city of Manchester. Oldham is surrounded by several smaller settlements which together form the Metropolitan Borough of Oldham; Chadderton and Hollinwood are such settlements. Chadderton and Hollinwood are served by the Rochdale Canal and the Hollinwood Branch Canal. A rail service was provided by the Oldham Loop Line that was built by the Lancashire and Yorkshire Railway.

== History ==
Oldham rose to prominence during the 19th century as an international centre of textile manufacture. It was a boomtown of the Industrial Revolution, and amongst the first ever industrialised towns, rapidly becoming "one of the most important centres of cotton and textile industries in England", spinning Oldham counts, the coarser counts of cotton. Oldham's soils were too thin and poor to sustain crop growing, and so for decades prior to industrialisation the area was used for grazing sheep, which provided the raw material for a local woollen weaving trade. It was not until the last quarter of the 18th century that Oldham changed from being a cottage industry township producing woollen garments via domestic manual labour, to a sprawling industrial metropolis of textile factories. The first mill, Lees Hall, was built by William Clegg in about 1778. Within a year, 11 other mills had been constructed, but by 1818 there were only 19 of these privately owned mills.

It was in the second half of the 19th century that Oldham became the world centre for spinning cotton yarn. This was due in a large part to the formation of limited liability companies known as Oldham Limiteds. In 1851, over 30% of Oldham's population was employed within the textile sector, compared to 5% across Great Britain. At its zenith, it was the most productive cotton spinning mill town in the world. Textile Mill was one of a cluster of mills built in Chadderton in 1882, it was designed by Potts, Pickup & Dixon. By 1871 the town of Oldham had more spindles than any country in the world except the United States, and in 1909, was spinning more cotton than France and Germany combined. By 1911 there were 16.4 million spindles in Oldham, compared with a total of 58 million in the United Kingdom and 143.5 million in the world; in 1928, with the construction of the UK's largest textile factory Oldham reached its manufacturing zenith. At its peak, there were over 360 mills, operating night and day;

The industry peaked in 1912, when it produced 8 billion yards of cloth. The Great War of 1914–1918 halted the supply of raw cotton, and the British government encouraged its colonies to build mills to spin and weave cotton. The war over, Lancashire never regained its markets. The independent mills were struggling. Textile Mill was closed in 1927. The Bank of England set up the Lancashire Cotton Corporation in 1929 to attempt to rationalise and save the industry. Textile Mill, Chadderton bought by the LCC, after World War II, and used it for storage of baled waste for export, and one of the 53 mills that survived through to 1950, when it was partly burnt out. Courtaulds sold it in 1966. The use for cotton waste continued. In 1996 it was reduced to two storeys.

== Architecture ==
=== Power ===
1300 hp engine by Hick, Hargreaves & Co.

=== Equipment ===
In 1915, 98,436 spindles – used by Platt as a show mill

== Usage ==
=== Owners ===
- Textile Mill Co Ltd (1882–1920)
- Bunting Group (1920–1927)
- Lancashire Cotton Corporation (1945+/-1964)
- Courtaulds (1964–1966)
- W.H. Holt and Son (1966–1988)
- Noor Textiles (2003-present)

== See also ==
- Textile manufacturing

== Bibliography ==
- Dunkerley, Philip (2009). "Dunkerley-Tuson Family Website, The Regent Cotton Mill, Failsworth". Archived from the original on 23 March 2008.
- Gurr, Duncan; Hunt, Julian (1998). The Cotton Mills of Oldham. Oldham Education & Leisure. ISBN 0-902809-46-6. Archived from the original on 18 July 2011.
- LCC (1951). The mills and organisation of the Lancashire Cotton Corporation Limited. Blackfriars House, Manchester: Lancashire Cotton Corporation Limited.
