= NOI =

NOI or Noi may refer to:

== Acronyms ==
- Nation of Islam, an African American political and religious movement
- Nation People Together (Națiune Oameni Împreună), a Romanian political party
- National Olympiad in Informatics, for selection to the International Olympiad in Informatics
- New Historical Option (Noua Opțiune Istorică), a Moldovan political party
- Net operating income
- Ngozi Okonjo-Iweala (born 1954), Nigerian politician
- NOI Techpark, Bolzano, Italy
- Nupe–Oko–Idoma languages, a subgroup of Volta–Niger languages

== Arts and entertainment ==
- Noi (album), by Eros Ramazzotti, 2012
- Noi the Albino, a 2003 Icelandic film directed by Dagur Kári
- Noi, a 2022 Italian adaptation of the American TV series This Is Us

== People with the surname ==
- Eric Noi (born 1967), English boxer
- Kouat Noi (born 1997), Sudanese-born Australian basketball player
- Reece Noi (born 1988), British Ghanaian actor
- Trinidad de la Noi (born 1998), Chilean model and actress

== Other uses ==
- Noi River, Thailand
- Bhilori language (ISO language code)
- Nitrosyl iodide, a chemical compound with this formula
