= Junction Mill, Middleton Junction =

Cotton mill in Greater Manchester, England

- Location in Greater Manchester

Spinning (mule mill)
- Location: Chadderton, England
- Serving canal: Rochdale Canal
- Serving railway: Lancashire and Yorkshire Railway
- Owner: Junction Spinning Co. Ltd.
- Further ownership: Lancashire Cotton Corporation (1937)
- Coordinates: 53.5411°N 2.1679°W

Construction
- Completed: 1874
- Renovated: 1920 (card room extension); 1925 (card room extension)
- Demolished: 2000

Design team
- Architect: Edward Potts

Power
- Date: 1874
- Engine maker: George Saxon & Co
- Installed horse power (ihp): 1000

Equipment
- Manufacturer: Asa Lees
- Mule Frames: 73,476 (1891); 73,572 (1915)

Junction Mill, Middleton Junction is a cotton spinning mill at Middleton junction, Chadderton in Greater Manchester alongside the Rochdale Canal.

It was built in 1874 by the Junction Spinning Company Ltd. Bought by the Lancashire Cotton Corporation in the 1930s. Closed in 1955 and now in multiple use.

== Location ==
Middleton Junction lies at the boundary of the towns of Middleton in the Metropolitan Borough of Rochdale and Chadderton in the Metropolitan Borough of Oldham, in Greater Manchester, England.

Middleton Junction stands on the Rochdale Canal, just south of the aqueduct that takes the canal over the Irk. The actual borough boundary lies to the west of the canal, and the west of Mills Hill Road. The M60 motorway passes to the south of Middleton Junction; the M62 passes to the north.

A heavy rail line enters Middleton from Moston and Chadderton to the south, and passes roughly parallel to the canal as they both continue through Castleton northwards to Rochdale.

Until 1966 Middleton Junction railway station served the area.

Junction Mill lay in Chadderton, as did Baytree Mill and Laurel Mill.

== History ==
Historically a part of Lancashire, Middleton took its name from being situated in the centre of several circumjacent settlements. In 1770, Middleton was a village of 20 houses; during the 18th and 19th centuries it grew into a thriving and populous seat of textile manufacture, so much so that Middleton was granted borough status in 1886. Middleton Junction took its name from the railway junction where the Oldham branch of the Manchester and Leeds Railway (M&LR) joined the main line. The M&LR main line opened on 4 July 1839, and the branch from Middleton Junction to Oldham Werneth railway station on 31 March 1842.

It was in the second half of the 19th century, that the area became the world centre for spinning cotton yarn. This was due in a large part to the formation of limited liability companies known as Oldham Limiteds. In 1851, over 30% of Oldham's population was employed within the textile sector, compared to 5% across Great Britain. At its zenith, it was the most productive cotton spinning mill town in the world. By 1871 Oldham had more spindles than any country in the world except the United States, and in 1909, was spinning more cotton than France and Germany combined.

The Rochdale Canal—one of the major navigable broad canals of the United Kingdom—was a highway of commerce during this time used for the haulage of cotton, wool, coal to and from the area. Land alongside the canal was a prime site for a new mill. In the boom of the early 1870s finance was available for new mills. Junction Mill, was one of a group of mills built then.

By 1911 there were 16.4 million spindles in Oldham, compared with a total of 58 million in the United Kingdom and 143.5 million in the world. The industry peaked in 1912 when it produced 8 billion yards of cloth. The Great War of 1914–18 halted the supply of raw cotton, and the British government encouraged its colonies to build mills to spin and weave cotton. The war over, Lancashire never regained its markets. Financially, the independent mills were struggling. The Bank of England set up the Lancashire Cotton Corporation in 1929 to attempt to rationalise and save the industry. Junction Mill, Middleton Junction was bought by the LCC, one of 104 mills they operated, and one of the 53 mills that they held in 1951; it closed in 1955.

== Architecture ==
A substantial engineering brick building with terracotta decoration. Designed by Edward Potts.

=== Power ===
The engine was by George Saxon & Co of Openshaw, and rated at 1000 hp.

=== Equipment ===
73,000 Asa Lees spindles in 1915.

=== Later extensions ===
Two extensions to the card room in 1920 and 1925

== Owners ==
- Junction Spinning Company Ltd (1874–1930s)
- Lancashire Cotton Corporation (1930s–1955)

== See also ==
- Textile manufacturing
- Cotton Mill

== Bibliography ==
- Dunkerley, Philip (2009). "Dunkerley-Tuson Family Website, The Regent Cotton Mill, Failsworth". Archived from the original on 23 March 2008.
- Gurr, Duncan; Hunt, Julian (1998). The Cotton Mills of Oldham. Oldham Education & Leisure. ISBN 0-902809-46-6. Archived from the original on 18 July 2011.
- LCC (1951). The mills and organisation of the Lancashire Cotton Corporation Limited. Blackfriars House, Manchester: Lancashire Cotton Corporation Limited.
- McNeil, R.; Nevell, M. (2000), A Guide to the Industrial Archaeology of Greater Manchester, Association for Industrial Archaeology, ISBN 0-9528930-3-7
- Roberts, A S (1921), "Arthur Robert's Engine List", Arthur Roberts Black Book., One guy from Barlick-Book Transcription, archived from the original on 23 July 2011
