= Laurel Mill, Middleton Junction =

Former cotton mill in Manchester, England

- Location in Greater Manchester

Spinning (mule weft mill)
- Location: Chadderton, Oldham, Greater Manchester, England
- Serving canal: Rochdale Canal
- Serving railway: Lancashire and Yorkshire Railway
- Owner: Laurel Mill Company
- Further ownership: Lancashire Cotton Corporation (before 1951); Courtaulds (1964)
- Coordinates: 53.5454°N 2.1697°W

Construction
- Completed: 1905

Power
- Date: 1905
- Engine maker: George Saxon
- Decommissioned: 1963
- Installed horse power (ihp): 1400

Equipment
- Manufacturer: Hetherington
- Mule Frames: 120,000 (1915)

Laurel Mill was a cotton spinning mill in the Mills Hill/Middleton Junction area of Chadderton, Oldham, Greater Manchester, England.

It was sited alongside the Rochdale Canal, which, until 1933 boundary changes, formed the boundary with Middleton, in the Metropolitan Borough of Rochdale.

It was built in 1905 by the Laurel Mill Company.

It was taken over by Messrs A. and A. Murgatroyd in 1929, and after a strike in June 1936 it was sold under the terms of the Cotton Spinning Industry Act 1936 out of spinning. Bought by the Lancashire Cotton Corporation in 1950, it was brought back into production baling waste for export. The building closed for the final time in 1966 and was demolished in 1988.

== Location ==
Middleton Junction lies at the boundary of Middleton and Chadderton in Greater Manchester

Middleton stands on the River Irk, 4.7 miles (7.6 km) south-southeast of Rochdale, and 5.1 miles (8.2 km) north-northeast of the city of Manchester.

Middleton Junction stands on the Rochdale Canal. The actual borough boundary lies to the west of the canal, and the west of Mills Hill Road. The M60 motorway passes to the south of Middleton Junction; the M62 passes to the north.

A heavy rail line enters Middleton from Moston and Chadderton to the south, and passes roughly parallel to the canal as they both continue through Castleton northwards to Rochdale. Until 1966 Middleton Junction railway station served the area.

Laurel Mill lay in Chadderton, as did Baytree Mill and Junction Mill.

== History ==
Historically a part of Lancashire, Middleton took its name from being situated in the centre of several circumjacent settlements. In 1770, Middleton was a village of 20 houses; during the 18th and 19th centuries it grew into a thriving and populous seat of textile manufacture, so much so that Middleton was granted borough status in 1886. Middleton Junction took its name from the railway junction where the Oldham branch of the Manchester and Leeds Railway (M&LR) joined the main line. The M&LR main line opened on 4 July 1839, and the branch from Middleton Junction to Oldham Werneth railway station on 31 March 1842.

It was in the second half of the 19th century, that the area became the world centre for spinning cotton yarn. This was due in a large part to the formation of limited liability companies known as Oldham Limiteds. In 1851, over 30% of Oldham's population was employed within the textile sector, compared to 5% across Great Britain. At its zenith, it was the most productive cotton spinning mill town in the world. By 1871 Oldham had more spindles than any country in the world except the United States, and in 1909, was spinning more cotton than France and Germany combined.

The Rochdale Canal – one of the major navigable broad canals of the United Kingdom – was a highway of commerce during this time used for the haulage of cotton, wool, coal to and from the area. Land alongside the canal was a prime site for a new mill. In the early nineteen hundreds there was a boom, and finance was available for new mills. Laurel Mill was one of a group of mills built in 1904–05.

By 1911 there were 16.4 million spindles in Oldham, compared with a total of 58 million in the United Kingdom and 143.5 million in the world. The industry peaked in 1912 when it produced 8 billion yards of cloth. The Great War of 1914–18 halted the supply of raw cotton, and the British government encouraged its colonies to build mills to spin and weave cotton. The war over, Lancashire never regained its markets.

On 10 July 1927, after heavy rain, the Rochdale Canal aqueduct breached and emptied its contents into the River Irk, which broke its banks and surged through Middleton causing loss of life. The mills were stopped as the empty canal could not provide the water needed for the condensers. Laurel needed 300 gallons a minute to operate. Financially, the independent mills were struggling. The Bank of England set up the Lancashire Cotton Corporation in 1929 to attempt to rationalise and save the industry. By May 1936, relationships between Messrs Murgatroyd and the Operative Cotton Spinners Association had broken down. This culminated in a strike on 6 June 1936. The firm entered into negotiations with the Spindles Board and consequently the mill and machinery were sold by auction by the board and the business terminated, thus depriving the employees of a remedy of their grievances and of their employment. It was raised in the House of Commons where it was deemed inappropriate that the provisions of the Cotton Spinning Industry Act 1936 should be used to circumvent the efforts of the trade union to secure proper conditions for their members.

Laurel Mill was sold in June 1937, at that time it had 119,520 mule spindles. Before 1951 it was bought by the LCC, being one of 104 mills they operated, and one of the 53 mills that they held in 1951 – it produced baled waste for export. It was passed to Courtaulds in 1964, closed in 1966 and demolished in 1988.

== Architecture ==
A substantial engineering brick building with terracotta decoration. Designed by Stott and Sons.

=== Power ===
From an external engine house placed between it and Bay Tree mill possibly to power both. The engine was by George Saxon & Co of Openshaw, rated at 1400 hp.

=== Equipment ===
120,000 Hetherington spindles in 1915.
119,520 weft mule spindles in 1936.

=== Later extensions ===
Office extension in 1938.

== Owners ==
- Laurel Mill Company Ltd (1905–1929)
- A. and A. Murgatroyd Ltd.(1929–1937)
- Cotton Spindles Board {1937}
- Hollands
- Lancashire Cotton Corporation (1950–1964)
- Courtaulds (1964-!966)

== See also ==
- Textile manufacturing

== Bibliography ==
- Dunkerley, Philip (2009). "Dunkerley-Tuson Family Website, The Regent Cotton Mill, Failsworth". Archived from the original on 23 March 2008.
- Gurr, Duncan; Hunt, Julian (1998). The Cotton Mills of Oldham. Oldham Education & Leisure. ISBN 0-902809-46-6.
- LCC (1951). The mills and organisation of the Lancashire Cotton Corporation Limited. Blackfriars House, Manchester: Lancashire Cotton Corporation Limited.
- McNeil, R.; Nevell, M. (2000). A Guide to the Industrial Archaeology of Greater Manchester. Association for Industrial Archaeology. ISBN 0-9528930-3-7.
- Roberts, A S (1921), "Arthur Robert's Engine List", Arthur Roberts Black Book., One guy from Barlick-Book Transcription, archived from the original on 23 July 2011
