= William Marcroft =

English co-operator (1822–1894)

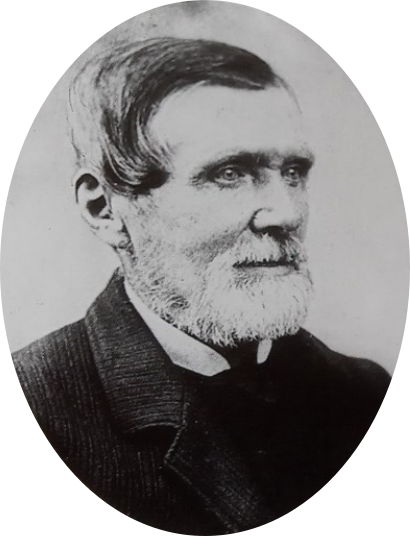
- Born: 15 July 1822; Middleton, Lancashire, England
- Died: 8 September 1894 (aged 72); Failsworth, Lancashire, England
- Movement: Co-operative
- Spouse: Jane Smith (m. 1844; died 1882)
- Children: 6

William Marcroft (15 July 1822 – 8 September 1894) was a British co-operator, writer, and advocate for producer co-operatives. Marcroft was active in the Oldham Industrial Co-operative Society, the Co-operative Wholesale Society, and the Oldham Building and Manufacturing Company (later renamed to the Sun Mill Company).

== Publications by Marcroft ==
- — (1870). A Co-operative Village: How to Conduct It, and Where to Form It. Manchester: Central Co-operative Board.
- — (1877). The Sun Mill Company, Limited; Its Commercial and Social History.
- — (1889). The Marcroft Family. Rochdale: E. Wrigley & Sons.
- — (1889). Ups and Downs: Life in Machine-Making Works. Oldham.
