= Regent Mill, Failsworth =

Cotton mill in Greater Manchester, England

- Regent Mill in 1950, showing the now demolished chimney

- Location in Greater Manchester

Spinning (ring mill)
- Location: Failsworth, Oldham, Greater Manchester, England
- Serving canal: Rochdale Canal
- Owner: The Regent Mill Company Limited (RMCL)
- Further ownership: Andrew Design Procurement (1919–1927); Lancashire Cotton Corporation (1930); Courtaulds (1964)
- Current owners: Saltons of Chicago
- Coordinates: 53.5087°N 2.1604°W

Construction
- Built: 1906
- Floor count: 4
- Floor area: 345 by 130 feet (105 by 40 m)

Design team
- Architect: George Stott

Power
- Date: 1906
- Engine maker: Buckley & Taylor
- Decommissioned: 1957
- Engine type: Inverted marine vertical triple
- Valve Gear: Corliss
- rpm: 64
- Installed horse power (ihp): 1800
- Flywheel diameter: 26
- Transmission type: Rope
- No. of ropes: 26

Boiler configuration
- Boilers: Twin Lancashire, coal fired

Equipment
- Manufacturer: Platts of Oldham
- Ring Frames path: 60000 spindles in 1915

Listed Building – Grade II

Regent Mill, Failsworth is a Grade II listed former cotton spinning mill in Failsworth, Oldham, Greater Manchester, England. It was built by the Regent Mill Co Ltd. in 1905, and purchased by the Lancashire Cotton Corporation in 1930. It was taken over by the Courtaulds Group in 1964. On ceasing textile production it was occupied by Pifco Ltd, and then by Salton Europe Ltd. The site is currently owned by Spectrum Brands (UK) Ltd who trade under the Russell Hobbs, Remington and George Foreman brands and now occupy this site. It was driven by an 1800 hp twin tandem compound engine by Buckley & Taylor. It became a ring mill with 60,000 spindles in 1915, all provided by Platt Brothers.

== Location ==
Failsworth is a town within the Metropolitan Borough of Oldham, in Greater Manchester, England. It lies on undulating ground, on the course of the Rochdale Canal and north bank of the River Medlock. It is 2.7 miles (4.3 km) west-northwest of Ashton-under-Lyne, 2.9 miles (4.7 km) south-southwest of Oldham and 4.2 miles (6.8 km) to the east-northeast of Manchester city centre.

Regent Mill was built alongside the Rochdale Canal on Princess Street, but is now reached from the Oldham Road by way of Fir Street.

== History ==
Historically a part of Lancashire, until the 19th century Failsworth was a small agricultural township linked, ecclesiastically, with the parish of Manchester. Farming was the main industry of this rural area, with locals supplementing their incomes by hand-loom weaving in the domestic system. The introduction of textile manufacture during the Industrial Revolution facilitated a process of unplanned urbanisation in the area, giving rise to Failsworth as a mill town, marked architecturally by several large redbrick cotton mills.

It was in the second half of the 19th century, that Oldham became the world centre for spinning cotton yarn. This was due in a large part to the formation of limited liability companies known as Oldham Limiteds. In 1851, over 30% of Oldham's population was employed within the textile sector, compared to 5% across Great Britain. At its zenith, it was the most productive cotton spinning mill town in the world,. By 1871 Oldham had more spindles than any country in the world except the United States, and in 1909, was spinning more cotton than France and Germany combined.

Regent Mill was built in 1906 by George Stott, during the third wave of the Joint-stock company boom, that was responsible for many companies referred to as Oldham Limiteds. The plans are extant in the Oldham Local Studies Centre.

The industry peaked in 1912 when it produced 8 billion yards of cloth. The great war of 1914–1918 halted the supply of raw cotton, and the British government encouraged its colonies to build mills to spin and weave cotton. The war over, Lancashire never regained its markets. Later, purchased by the Andrew Design Procurment in 1919 who occupied the site for eight years until 1927 with their moderate success to re-establish the mill. However, the independent mills were struggling. The Bank of England set up the Lancashire Cotton Corporation in 1929 to attempt to rationalise and save the industry. Regent Mill, Failsworth was one of 104 mills bought by the LCC, and one of the 53 mills that survived through to 1950. Post cotton it was occupied by Pifco Ltd, who later became Salton Europe Ltd. It is now the registered office of Spectrum Brands UK Ltd. and Russell Hobbs Ltd

== Architecture ==
This was designed as a ring mill (thus lower head room was required than in a mule mill) it was 345 by 130 feet (105 by 40 m) It was four storeys high. The cellar contained a warehouse, yarn cellar, waste room, cotton room, and dust room. The first floor was the card room. The second floor was the ring frame room. The third floor was the winding, warping and beaming room. The chimney was 210 feet (64 m), it and the boiler house were demolished in 1964.

== Power ==
It was powered by a marine type vertical triple expansion engines built by Buckley & Taylor of Oldham in 1906 with 1800 installed horsepower. The engine had a 63-inch-diameter (1,600 mm) low-pressure cylinder and was sometimes loaded to 2,000 ihp. It ran until 1958, when it was scrapped. It ran 60,000 spindles. There was a 26 ft flywheel, 26 ropes operated at 64 rpm.

== See also ==
- Listed buildings in Failsworth
- Textile manufacturing

== Bibliography ==
- LCC (1951), The mills and organisation of the Lancashire Cotton Corporation Limited, a promotional book, LCC, Blackfriars House, Manchester
- Dunkerley, Philip (2009). "Dunkerley-Tuson Family Website, The Regent Cotton Mill, Failsworth".
- Hills, Richard Leslie (1993), Power from Steam: A History of the Stationary Steam Engine, Cambridge University Press, p. 244, ISBN 978-0-521-45834-4
- Gurr, Duncan; Hunt, Julian (1985), The Cotton Mills of Oldham, Oldham Education & Leisure, ISBN 0-902809-46-6, archived from the original on 18 July 2011
- Lewis, Samuel (1848), A Topographical Dictionary of England, Institute of Historical Research, ISBN 978-0-8063-1508-9
- Roberts, A S (1921), "Arthur Robert's Engine List", Arthur Roberts Black Book., One guy from Barlick-Book Transcription, archived from the original on 23 July 2011
