= Hyson Green Methodist Free Church =

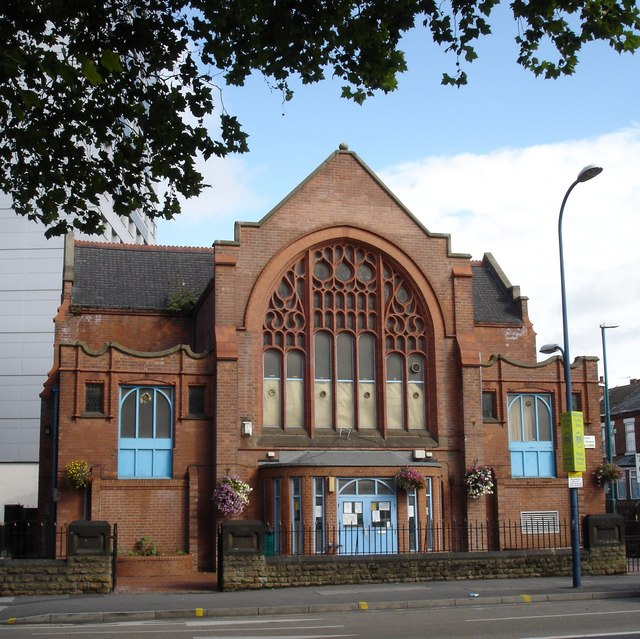
- Former Hyson Green Methodist Free Church, now Hyson Green Community Centre
- Hyson Green Methodist Free Church
- 52.965275°N 1.171558°W
- Location: Hyson Green Nottingham
- Country: England
- Denomination: Methodist

Architecture
- Architect: F. W. Dixon & Son
- Style: Gothic revival architecture
- Completed: 1895

Hyson Green Methodist Free Church is a former Methodist church at the junction of Noel Street and Gregory Boulevard in Hyson Green, Nottingham.

== History ==
The foundation stones were laid on 21 October 1895. It was built to designs by Frederick W Dixon. The congregation had outgrown its small chapel on Lindsay Street. The general contractor was John Lewin of Netherfield. The front is faced in Ruabon Terracotta, and Darley Dale stone dressing.

It was later converted to Hyson Green Girls' Club, and is now Hyson Green Community Centre.
