= Vance Miller =

British businessman (born 1965)

- Born: 1965 (age 60–61); Rochdale, Lancashire, England
- Occupation: Entrepreneur

Vance Miller (born 1965) is an entrepreneur from Rochdale, Lancashire, in England. Miller, whose business practices have attracted controversy, has been referred to in the media as "The Kitchen Gangster" after being featured the 2004 BBC series "Saturday Kitchen Gangster". Miller is currently a fugitive from the law after his 2013 verdict after he fled the country, he still owes victims around £2,000,000.

== Biography ==
In 1977, Vance Miller got his first job at age 11, earning £200 per week for cleaning cars. By 1981, he was dealing in antiques and vintage cars from a shop in Butter Lane Market in Manchester. He also spent two years 1982–83 in San Diego, California and imported some cars to sell there.

Miller is the former executive director of Maple Industries which operate from Maple Mill in the Hathershaw area of Oldham. On 21 April 2009, Maple Mill was partially destroyed in a fire.

Vance Miller featured in the documentary aired on Channel 4 called Brits Get Rich in China. Miller is the subject of a book entitled: Kitchen Gangster? The Story of a Serial Entrepreneur.

Miller is currently the chief executive officer of Maple Industries China

In November 1995, he was sentenced to 18 months imprisonment on counts of kidnapping and affray, following an incident in which he was ruled to have kidnapped two people he caught breaking into his mother's home and detained them against their will. In February 1999, he was detained over an altercation over a minor pollution complaint near his Birtle Mill, Bury business premises. In related incidents, his company was fined £28,500 for health and safety breaches and he was convicted for damaging the car of a journalist.

In 2006 Miller's home in Ramsbottom was attacked twice by arsonists.

In July 2007, the magazine Real Business printed an article and interview with Vance Miller written by Charles Orton-Jones, covering his business history and current activities in some depth. Orton-Jones describes his business achievements as staggering and states his attention to detail is inconsistent with his reputation as a shyster.

== Trading Standards actions against Miller ==
In 2002 the Office of Fair Trading instigated the "Stop Now" order and he became the first person in Britain to be handed one after supplying a kitchen which was not sold as advertised.

In June 2003, defending himself without lawyers, he was called "intelligent, cunning, manipulative but above all arrogant" by a Manchester judge who jailed him for nine months for contempt of court when he failed to improve operations at his Oldham-based company, Maple Industries. He was released 2 weeks later on the undertaking to employ business efficiency consultants.

In 2006 the Greater Manchester Police and Trading Standards raided two residential properties, one belonging to Miller, as well as the company's Maple Mill offices and factory. As a result of the raids four people, including Miller, were arrested on suspicion of conspiracy to defraud in what was one of Tradings Standards' biggest ever operations. The company was able to continue trading despite Trading Standards seizing property in a bid to pursue its case against the company.

On 21 February 2007, under the General Product Safety Regulations 2005, Trading Standards Officers in Oldham ordered Vance Miller, again trading from Maple Mill, to immediately withdraw four types of minibikes from sale. The products failed national safety provisions.

On 28 May 2008, Vance Miller was issued a six-month suspended sentence and a £90,000 fine by the Manchester Crown Court in relation to an alleged breach of the Stop Now legislation brought against him in 2003. The judge presiding over the case, however, has noted that "there was evidence of a significant and continuing reduction in complaints against Miller's business since the summer of 2007." The judge noted that since the Office of Fair Trading was unable to provide any evidence of breaches since early 2006 then Miller was to be sentenced on the assumption that no breaches had taken place since then.

In January 2010 Miller was cleared of all charges put forward by Oldham Trading Standards Department, following a decision that there was insufficient evidence. The trading standards claims and trial were reported as a £4m vendetta against Miller.

In September 2016, prosecutors began moves to seize Miller's assets - which include a house in Ramsbottom, Lancashire - under the Proceeds of Crime Act. The act allows for confiscation hearings to proceed against people who have absconded after being summonsed to appear on charges.

In November 2017 a confiscation order for £2.3 million was made against his assets in the UK.

== Alleged kidnapping ==
On 24 May 2007 the Manchester Evening News reported that Vance Miller was on the run in China after evading police officers who had called at his Oldham Mill to arrest him over an alleged kidnap involving two men breaking into his mother's house. Coincidentally, a few days later, on 28 May 2007, Channel 4 screened a documentary that followed Miller and two other British entrepreneurs doing business in China.

== Maple Mill burns down ==
On 21 April 2009 Miller's main kitchen factory and base of operations in Oldham caught fire, severely damaging the six-storey Maple Mill. The fire is thought to have started near the diesel generator of the factory and ignited the contents of propane cylinders and pallets. Sixty firefighters used ten fire engines and "a number of specialist appliances, including two aerial appliances, to contain the fire." Fire Service spokesman Paul Duggan said: "The fire is thought to have started in a diesel generator then spread to some wooden pallets and propane cylinders nearby, some of which exploded as a result. There were people inside at the time but there were no reported injuries or any reports of anyone missing." Local townspeople near the area had been left without water or very little.

On 15 December 2016 the mill was again on fire, with parts of it collapsing.
