= Woolstenhulmes & Rye =

English manufacturer (1821–1897)

Coordinates: 53°28′26″N 2°10′45″W

Woolstenhulme & Rye
- Industry: Engineering
- Founded: 1821
- Defunct: 1888 (Liquidation)
- Successor: Oldham Engineering Co. (liq.1897)
- Headquarters: Oldham
- Number of locations: 1 (Lower Moor Iron Works)
- Key people: William Woolstenhulme, William Rye
- Products: Stationary steam engines
- Owner: 1821– Abraham Seville & Co. 1828– Seville & Woolstenhulme; 1855– Woolstenhulme & Rye

Woolstenhulmes & Rye was a company that manufactured stationary steam engines. It was based in Oldham, Lancashire, England. The company produced large steam-driven engines for textile mills in Oldham and elsewhere.

== History ==
Abraham Seville & Co started business in 1821 in Mumps, Oldham as roller makers for textile machinery. By 1828, William Woolstenhulme had entered the business, they had moved to the Lower Moor Ironworks and were spindle makers, iron and brass founders. The name was changed to Seville and Woolstenhulme. The business expanded and by 1846 they were employing 250 workers and were manufacturing self-acting mules and power looms. In 1854 they exhibited a 12 hp steam engine.

William Rye, an engineer from Manchester, entered the business in 1840 and married the senior partner's daughter in 1842. When Seville retired in 1855, Rye took the partnership along with William's son, John and the firm became Woolstenhulmes & Rye. About this time they closed the machine-making side of the business and concentrated on producing steam engines for the mills. Rye was mayor of Oldham in 1868. He was responsible for construction of Albert's Mount housing in Derker. The company was incorporated as Woolstenhulmes, Rye and Company Limited in 1873.

Woolstenhulmes & Rye engines are said to be conservative in design and Gurr & Hunt state that there was no evidence that the company had ever used Corliss valves. In apparent contradiction to this, in his Black Book engine list, Arthur Roberts refers to the engine they supplied to Mellowdew's Parkfield Mill in 1874 stating that Corliss valves were fitted to the High Pressure cylinder. However, given the early date of this engine, and the prevailing conservative attitude of the Oldham spinning trade, it is highly likely that this engine was originally fitted with slide valve cylinders and that the high pressure cylinder was subsequently replaced. This was a very common practice in the Oldham spinning mills where slide valve engines were still being supplied as late as the 1890's but many of these had been re-built with Corliss HP cylinders and higher pressure boilers by the 1920s. This hypothesis is further supported by the fact that Arthur Roberts states the boiler pressure to be 140 psi which would be exceptionally high for 1874.

== Mills driven by their engines ==
Woolstenhulmes & Rye produced mill engines in the 1860s, but their principal period of production was in the 1870s, when they produced 17 engines giving a total of 10,970 ihp, and in the 1880s, when they made 22 engines giving 11,000 ihp, before they fell into financial difficulties and were liquidated in 1888.

- Parkfield Mill, Oldham – 1874
- Prince of Wales Mill, Oldham – 1875
- West End, Mill, Oldham – 1878
- Duke Mill, Shaw – 1883
- Thornham No.2 Mill, Royton – 1885
