= Orme Mill, Waterhead =

Cotton mill in Greater Manchester, England

- The mill before 1951

- Location in Greater Manchester

Spinning (ring mill)
- Location: Waterhead, Oldham, Greater Manchester, England
- Owner: Orme Ring Mill
- Further ownership: Lancashire Cotton Corporation (1930s); Courtaulds (1964)
- Coordinates: 53.5481°N 2.0738°W

Construction
- Completed: 1908
- Floor count: 4
- Floor area: 29,493 sq ft (2,740.0 m^{2})

Design team
- Architect: F.W.Dixon

Power
- Date: 1911
- Engine maker: George Saxon & Co
- Engine type: vertical triple expansion engine
- Valve Gear: Corliss valves on all cylinders
- Cylinder diameter and throw: 21"HP, 33"IP, 51"LP X 4ft stroke.
- rpm: 75rpm
- Installed horse power (ihp): 1250hp
- Flywheel diameter: 22ft
- Transmission type: ropes
- No. of ropes: 35

Boiler configuration
- Pressure: 180psi

Equipment
- Cotton count: medium
- Ring Frames path: 62000 spindles

Orme Mill, Waterhead is a cotton spinning mill in Waterhead, Oldham, Greater Manchester, England. It was built in 1908. It was taken over by the Lancashire Cotton Corporation in the 1930s and production finished in 1960. The mill was passed on to Ferranti in 1964, and is now in multiple usage.

== Location ==
Oldham is a large town in Greater Manchester, England. It lies amongst the Pennines on elevated ground between the rivers Irk and Medlock, 5.3 miles (8.5 km) south-southeast of Rochdale, and 6.9 miles (11.1 km) northeast of the city of Manchester. Oldham is surrounded by several smaller settlements which together form the Metropolitan Borough of Oldham; Lees and Waterhead are such settlements to the east of the town centred. Waterhead lies on high ground on the Huddersfield to the Manchester road. A rail service was provided by the Oldham Loop Line that was built by the Lancashire and Yorkshire Railway. Waterhead hosted a group of twentieth century mill: Orme, Majestic, Cairo, Bangor, Oldham and Lees and the older Hey Mill.

== History ==
Oldham rose to prominence during the 19th century as an international centre of textile manufacture. It was a boomtown of the Industrial Revolution, and amongst the first ever industrialised towns, rapidly becoming "one of the most important centres of cotton and textile industries in England", spinning Oldham counts, the coarser counts of cotton. Oldham's soils were too thin and poor to sustain crop growing, and so for decades prior to industrialisation the area was used for grazing sheep, which provided the raw material for a local woollen weaving trade. It was not until the last quarter of the 18th century that Oldham changed from being a cottage industry township producing woollen garments via domestic manual labour, to a sprawling industrial metropolis of textile factories. The first mill, Lees Hall, was built by William Clegg in about 1778. Within a year, 11 other mills had been constructed, but by 1818 there were only 19 of these privately owned mills.

It was in the second half of the 19th century, that Oldham became the world centre for spinning cotton yarn. This was due in a large part to the formation of limited liability companies known as Oldham Limiteds. In 1851, over 30% of Oldham's population was employed within the textile sector, compared to 5% across Great Britain. At its zenith, it was the most productive cotton spinning mill town in the world. By 1871 Oldham had more spindles than any country in the world except the United States, and in 1909, was spinning more cotton than France and Germany combined. By 1911 there were 16.4 million spindles in Oldham, compared with a total of 58 million in the United Kingdom and 143.5 million in the world; in 1928, with the construction of the UK's largest textile factory Oldham reached its manufacturing zenith. At its peak, there were over 360 mills, operating night and day;

The industry peaked in 1912 when it produced 8 billion yards of cloth. The Great War of 1914–1918 halted the supply of raw cotton, and the British government encouraged its colonies to build mills to spin and weave cotton. The war over, Lancashire never regained its markets. The independent mills were struggling. The Bank of England set up the Lancashire Cotton Corporation in 1929 to attempt to rationalise and save the industry. Orme Mill, Waterhead was one of 104 mills bought by the LCC, and one of the 53 mills that survived until 1950. Post cotton, Orme Mill hosted a Ferranti ITEC centre, and is now in multiple usage including a firm of architects.

== Architecture ==
Designed by architects F. W. Dixon & Son. Four floors with 29,493 sq ft (2,740.0 m^{2}) of floor space in total.

=== Power ===
It was powered by a 1250 hp, vertical triple expansion engine by George Saxon & Co of Openshaw, in 1911. The cylinders, 21"HP, 33"IP, 51"LP had a 4 ft (1.2 m) stroke. These operated 35 ropes from a 75rpm 22 ft (6.7 m) flywheel. They were steamed at 180psi. The engine weighed 22 tons.

=== Equipment ===
62,000 ring spindles by T. Holt, and Tweedales & Smalley.

== Owners ==
- Orme Ring Mill
- Lancashire Cotton Corporation (1930s–1960)
- Ferranti

== See also ==
- Textile manufacturing

== Bibliography ==
- Dunkerley, Philip (2009). "Dunkerley-Tuson Family Website, The Regent Cotton Mill, Failsworth". Archived from the original on 23 March 2008.
- LCC (1951). The mills and organisation of the Lancashire Cotton Corporation Limited. Blackfriars House, Manchester: Lancashire Cotton Corporation Limited.
- Gurr, Duncan; Hunt, Julian (1998), The Cotton Mills of Oldham, Oldham Education & Leisure, ISBN 0-902809-46-6
- Roberts, A S (1921), "Arthur Robert's Engine List", Arthur Roberts Black Book., One guy from Barlick-Book Transcription, archived from the original on 23 July 2011
