= Maple Mill, Oldham =

Cotton spinning mill in Greater Manchester, England

Maple Mill
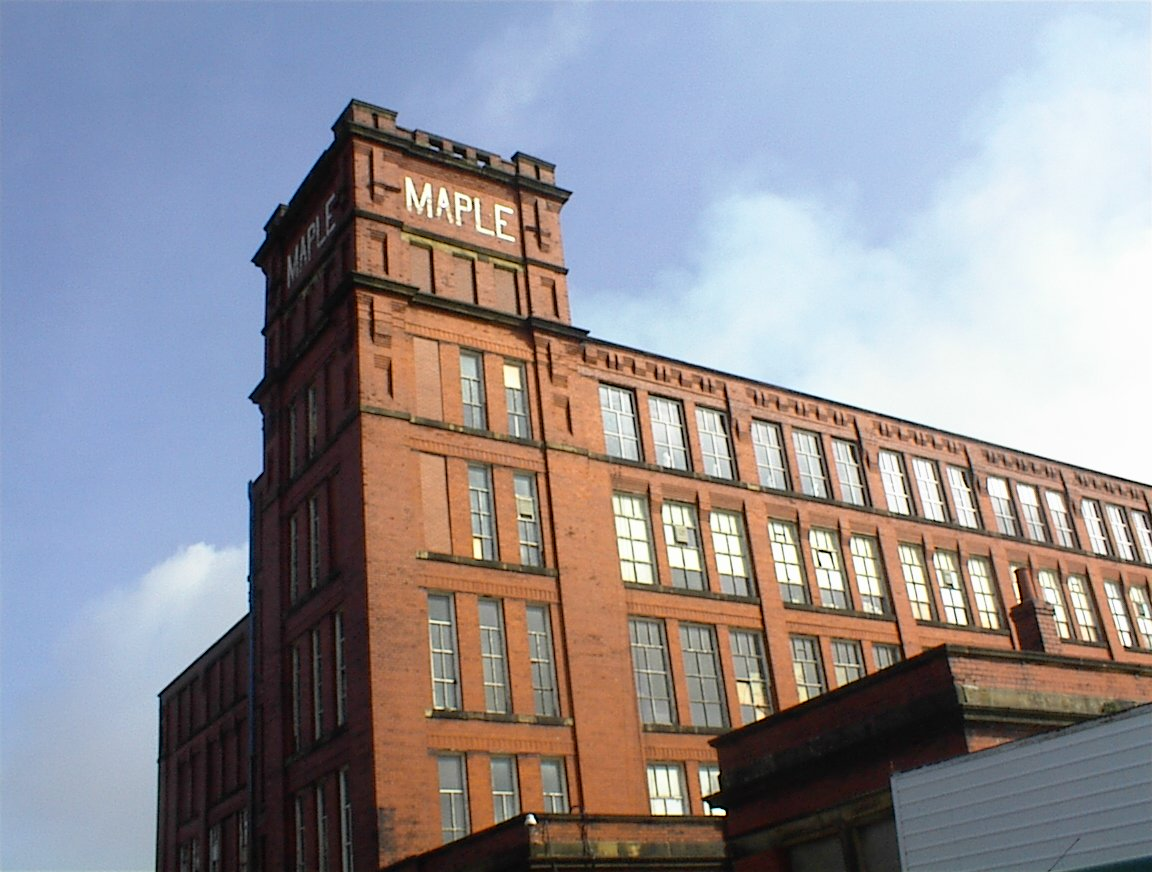
- Maple Mill No. 1 in 2009

- Location in Greater Manchester

Cotton
- Location: Hathershaw, Oldham, Greater Manchester, England
- Owner: Vance Miller
- Further ownership: Courtaulds (spinning in the 1990s) ()
- Coordinates: 53.526325°N 2.1071023°W

Construction
- Built: Maple No.1: 1904; Maple No.2: 1915
- Renovated: Maple No.1: 1990
- Demolished: Maple No.2: 2009 (Fire); Maple No.1: 2016 (Fire); Chimney: 2022

Design team
- Architect: P.S.Stott

Power
- Date: 1904
- Engine maker: Maple No.1: George Saxon & Co; Maple No.2: Urmson & Thompson
- Engine type: Maple No.1: vertical triple expansion engine *18 ½" HGP, *29" IP, * 47"LP
- Valve Gear: Maple No.1: Corliss
- Cylinder diameter and throw: Maple No.1: 48 in
- rpm: Maple No.1: 75
- Installed horse power (ihp): Maple No.1: 1000; Maple No.2: 1800
- Flywheel diameter: Maple No.1: 22 ft
- Transmission type: rope

Boiler configuration
- Pressure: Maple No.1: 185

Equipment
- Manufacturer: Platts

The Maple Mill was a cotton spinning mill in Hathershaw, Oldham, Greater Manchester, England. It was designed as a double mill by the architect Sydney Stott. The first mill was built in 1904 and the second mill in 1915. In 1968, it was equipped with the first open-end spinning machines in England. When spinning ceased in the 1990s, it was bought by Vance Miller. Trading Standards raided the mill in 2006, and ordered Mr Miller stop selling products that failed national safety provisions. Maple Mill No. 2 was the first mill to be partially destroyed by a fire on April 21, 2009. The fire brigade was in attendance for two weeks and deployed 34 appliances. Later on in 2016, Maple Mill No. 1 was damaged by fire on September 30. On 15 December 2016 a major incident was declared when the same mill became fully ablaze. The land of the two mills has now been cleared fully since 2021, including its chimney, and the site is now housing.

== Architecture ==
Maple Mill was a double mill. Maple No.2 was designed by P.S.Stott, so the round chimney carried the double rings that were his trademark. This was a six-storey red brick mill built in 1904. Stott did not use concrete floors but a triple brick arched vault construction, however here there was a concrete ceiling. Though the chimney stands it has been truncated.

=== Power ===
Maple No. 1 was powered by a 1000 hp vertical triple-expansion engine built by George Saxon & Co, of Openshaw. It had a 48-inch stroke, and its high-pressure cylinder was 18 1/2 inches in diameter. The intermediate-pressure was 29 inches, and the low-pressure was 47 inches. It was pressured to 185 psi, and ran a 22 ft flywheel at 75 rpm. There were Corliss valves on all cylinders. The air pump was driven from LP crosshead. Maple No.2 was powered by an 1800 hp engine from Urmson & Thompson.

=== Equipment ===
Both mills ran mules supplied by Platts. Maple I had 114,456 Spindles and Maple 2 had 55,888 Spindles.

== History ==
It was designed as a double mill by P.S.Stott, in 1904. The first mill was built then and the second mill in 1915. It worked as a mule spinning mill.

It was taken over by Fine Spinners and Doublers in the 1950s.

Maple Mill was sold to Courtaulds in 1964. In 1968, Maple Mill was selected by Courtaulds to receive the first top secret BD 200s, Open End Spinning machines from Czechoslovakia. These were experimental, and coming without documentation were difficult to operate. Simply, they were designed for Uzbek cotton not the American cotton or synthetics used in Oldham. A research visit by Courtaulds staff to Ústí nad Labem in August 1968, was interrupted by Soviet tanks putting down the Prague Spring uprising. Later a body of Czech technicians was based at Maple Mill, until the problems had been resolved. This was a rare example of cross Iron Curtain co-operation. Courtaulds ceased cotton spinning at the mill in 1991, but it was re-opened a year later by Wills Fabrics Ltd who continued spinning and weaving on the site until the company went into administration 1998.

=== Vance Miller ownership ===
It was bought by Vance Miller and used to manufacture and market fitted kitchens and furniture.

In 2006 the Greater Manchester Police and Trading Standards raided the Maple Mill offices and factory of Vance Miller. As a result of the raids four people, including Miller, were arrested on suspicion of conspiracy to defraud in what was one of Tradings Standards' biggest ever operations. The company was able to continue trading despite Trading Standards seizing property in a bid to pursue its case against the company.

On 21 February 2007, under the General Product Safety Regulations Act 2005, Trading Standards Officers in Oldham ordered Vance Miller, again trading from Maple Mill, to immediately withdraw four types of minibikes from sale. The products failed national safety provisions.

=== Fires ===
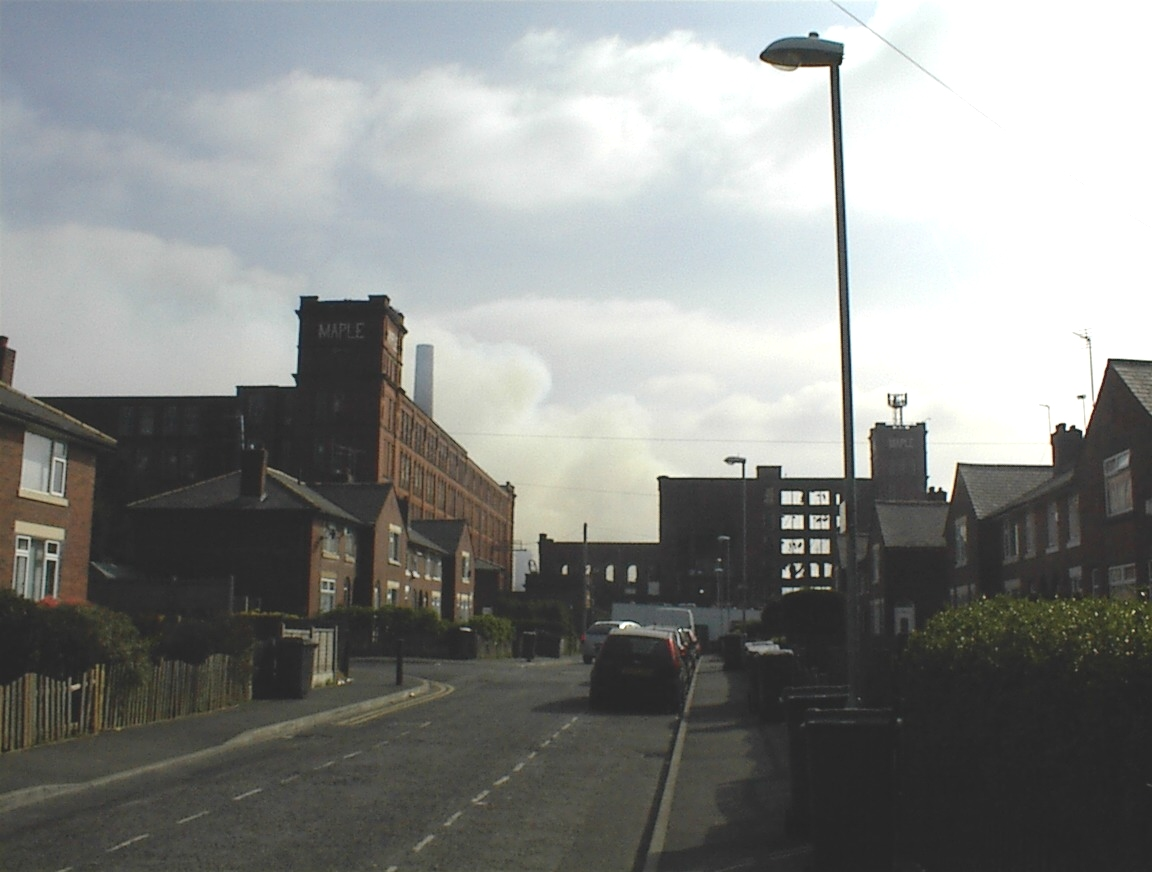
Maple Mills after the 2009 fire. Mill 1 is on the left. The remains of Mill 2 are on the right.

On 21 April 2009, a fire started near the diesel generator of the kitchen factory (Maple No.2) and ignited the contents of propane cylinders and pallets. Sixty firefighters used ten fire engines and "a number of specialist appliances, including two aerial appliances, to contain the fire." Fire Service spokesman Paul Duggan said: "The fire is thought to have started in a diesel generator then spread to some wooden pallets and propane cylinders nearby, some of which exploded as a result. There were people inside at the time but there were no reported injuries or any reports of anyone missing." Local townspeople near the area had been left without water or very little The building is burnt out. The fire was the largest incident attended by Greater Manchester Fire Service for several years. At the height of the fire, a total of 34 fire appliances from across Manchester attended including three aerial appliances, Hose Layers and High Volume Pumping Units. The Fire Service were in continuous attendance for two weeks.

On 30 September 2016 a fire devastated the first floor of Maple No.1 mill.

On the morning of 15 December 2016 another fire started at the Maple No.1. The fire started on the top floor of the mill. Around 70 firefighters attended, with nearby properties evacuated. The building was declared to be structurally unstable as a result of the fire, during which large parts of the building collapsed, and work to demolish unsafe portions of the mill began on 16 December, expected to take three days. Although the mill was vacant, some people may have been sleeping inside it. People living in caravans had been seen at the site since September 2016, with Vance Miller saying that the fire would not have started if travellers had been evicted from the site. Fire crews left the mill on 24 December, nine days after the fire started; most of the mill was demolished, with only a tower remaining.

== See also ==
- List of mills in Oldham
