= Fox Mill =

Cotton mill in Hollinwood, Greater Manchester, England

- The mill before 1951

- Location in Greater Manchester

Spinning (ring mill)
- Location: Hollinwood, Oldham, Greater Manchester, England
- Further ownership: Lancashire Cotton Corporation (1930s); Courtaulds (1964)
- Coordinates: 53.5200°N 2.1346°W

Construction
- Completed: 1908
- Demolished: 1992

Power
- Date: 1909
- Engine maker: George Saxon & Co
- Engine type: Single Manhattan
- Cylinder diameter and throw: 28 in (710 mm) HP (vertical), 57 in (1,400 mm) LP X 4 ft 6 in (1.37 m) stroke.
- rpm: 78 ½ rpm
- Installed horse power (ihp): 1800hp
- Flywheel diameter: 22 ft (6.7 m)
- Transmission type: rope
- No. of ropes: 36

Boiler configuration
- Pressure: 180 pounds per square inch (1,200 kPa)

Fox Mill was a cotton spinning mill in Hollinwood, Oldham, Greater Manchester, England. It was taken over by the Lancashire Cotton Corporation in the 1930s and passed to Courtaulds in 1964.

== Location ==
Oldham is a large town in Greater Manchester, England. It lies amongst the Pennines on elevated ground between the rivers Irk and Medlock, 5.3 miles (8.5 km) south-southeast of Rochdale, and 6.9 miles (11.1 km) northeast of the city of Manchester. Oldham is surrounded by several smaller settlements which together form the Metropolitan Borough of Oldham; Chadderton and Hollinwood are such settlements. Chadderton and Hollinwood are served by the Rochdale Canal and the Hollinwood Branch Canal. A rail service was provided by the Oldham Loop Line that was built by the Lancashire and Yorkshire Railway. Since the closure of the Oldham Loop Line it has since been converted as part of the Manchester Metrolink network which opened on 13 June 2012.

== History ==
Oldham rose to prominence during the 19th century as an international centre of textile manufacture. It was a boomtown of the Industrial Revolution, and amongst the first ever industrialised towns, rapidly becoming "one of the most important centres of cotton and textile industries in England", spinning Oldham counts, the coarser counts of cotton. Oldham's soils were too thin and poor to sustain crop growing, and so for decades prior to industrialisation the area was used for grazing sheep, which provided the raw material for a local woollen weaving trade. It was not until the last quarter of the 18th century that Oldham changed from being a cottage industry township producing woollen garments via domestic manual labour, to a sprawling industrial metropolis of textile factories. The first mill, Lees Hall, was built by William Clegg in about 1778. Within a year, 11 other mills had been constructed, but by 1818 there were only 19 of these privately owned mills.

It was in the second half of the 19th century, that Oldham became the world centre for spinning cotton yarn. This was due in a large part to the formation of limited liability companies known as Oldham Limiteds. In 1851, over 30% of Oldham's population was employed within the textile sector, compared to 5% across Great Britain. At its zenith, it was the most productive cotton spinning mill town in the world. By 1871 Oldham had more spindles than any country in the world except the United States, and in 1909, was spinning more cotton than France and Germany combined. By 1911 there were 16.4 million spindles in Oldham, compared with a total of 58 million in the United Kingdom and 143.5 million in the world; in 1928, with the construction of the UK's largest textile factory Oldham reached its manufacturing zenith. At its peak, there were over 360 mills, operating night and day; Fox mill was erected in 1908. The industry peaked in 1912 when it produced 8 billion yards of cloth. The great war of 1914–1918 halted the supply of raw cotton, and the British government encouraged its colonies to build mills to spin and weave cotton. The war over, Lancashire never regained its markets. The independent mills were struggling. The Bank of England set up the Lancashire Cotton Corporation in 1929 to attempt to rationalise and save the industry. Fox Mill, Hollinwood was one of 104 mills bought by the LCC, and one of the 53 mills that survived through to 1950. Courtaulds used Fox mill to spin Rayon until 1989 when the market collapsed. It was bought by J.D. Williams a mail-order company. The mill is now demolished and housing is on the site.

== Architecture ==
=== Power ===
Powered by 1,800 hp (1,300 kW) single Manhattan engine by George Saxon & Co, 1909 with the following characteristics:

- 28 in (710 mm) HP (vertical)
- 57 in (1,400 mm) LP X 4 ft 6 in (1.37 m) stroke.
- 180 psi (1,200 kPa)
- 78 ½ rpm
- 22 ft (6.7 m) flywheel,
- 36 ropes.

== Usage ==
Cotton Spinners from inception until 1967; then spun man-made fibres until it ceased to be owned by Courtaulds.

=== Owners ===
- Lancashire Cotton Corporation (1930s–1964)
- Courtaulds (1964–1989)
- J.D.Williams (1989–1992)

== See also ==
- Textile manufacturing

== Bibliography ==
- Dunkerley, Philip (2009). "Dunkerley-Tuson Family Website, The Regent Cotton Mill, Failsworth". Archived from the original on 23 March 2008.
- Gurr, Duncan; Hunt, Julian (1985). The Cotton Mills of Oldham. Oldham Education & Leisure. ISBN 0-902809-46-6. Archived from the original on 18 July 2011.
- LCC (1951). The mills and organisation of the Lancashire Cotton Corporation Limited. Blackfriars House, Manchester: Lancashire Cotton Corporation Limited.
- Roberts, A S (1921), "Arthur Robert's Engine List", Arthur Roberts Black Book., One guy from Barlick-Book Transcription, archived from the original on 23 July 2011
