= Ace Mill, Hollinwood =

Cotton spinning mill in Greater Manchester, England

- The mill before 1951

- Location in Greater Manchester

Spinning (mule mill)
- Location: Chadderton, Greater Manchester, England
- Serving canal: Rochdale Canal, Hollinwood Branch Canal
- Serving railway: Oldham Loop Line
- Owner: Ace Mill Ltd
- Further ownership: Lancashire Cotton Corporation (1930s); Courtaulds (1964)
- Coordinates: 53.5312°N 2.1565°W

Construction
- Completed: 1914
- Renovated: 1946
- Floor count: 5

Design team
- Architect: P.S.Stott

Power
- Engine maker: Urmson & Thompson
- Engine type: Cross compound
- rpm: 64
- Installed horse power (ihp): 2500
- Flywheel diameter: 26 ft (7.9 m)
- Transmission type: Rope
- No. of ropes: 42

Equipment
- Date: 1919
- Manufacturer: Platts
- Cotton count: 1's to 20ś
- Mule Frames: 118,032 spindles

Ace Mill is a cotton spinning mill in Chadderton in the Metropolitan Borough of Oldham, Greater Manchester. It was built as Gorse No. 2 Mill, in 1914 and cotton was first spun in 1919 by the Ace Mill Ltd, who renamed the mill. It was taken over by the Lancashire Cotton Corporation in the 1930s and passed to Courtaulds in 1964. Production ended in 1967.

Although known as Ace Mill, Hollinwood (due to Hollinwood being the closest serving railway station), the mill is located in the Whitegate area of south Chadderton around a mile away from Hollinwood.

The five-storey mill has a floor area of 38,500 sq ft (3,580 m^{2}). It is now used as a warehouse. It was powered by a 2500 hp cross compound engine (Mary and Elizabeth) by Urmson and Thompson built in 1920. It had a 26 ft (7.9 m) flywheel with 42 ropes that ran at 64rpm.

== Location ==
Oldham is a large town in Greater Manchester, England. It lies amongst the Pennines on elevated ground between the rivers Irk and Medlock, 5.3 miles (8.5 km) south-southeast of Rochdale, and 6.9 miles (11.1 km) northeast of the city of Manchester. Oldham is surrounded by several smaller settlements which together form the Metropolitan Borough of Oldham; Chadderton and Hollinwood are such settlements. Chadderton and Hollinwood are served by the Rochdale Canal and the Hollinwood Branch Canal. A rail service was provided by the Oldham Loop Line that was built by the Lancashire and Yorkshire Railway.

=== History ===
Oldham rose to prominence during the 19th century as an international centre of textile manufacture. It was a boomtown of the Industrial Revolution, and amongst the first ever industrialised towns, rapidly becoming "one of the most important centres of cotton and textile industries in England", spinning Oldham counts, the coarser counts of cotton. Oldham's soils were too thin and poor to sustain crop growing, and so for decades prior to industrialisation the area was used for grazing sheep, which provided the raw material for a local woollen weaving trade. It was not until the last quarter of the 18th century that Oldham changed from being a cottage industry township producing woollen garments via domestic manual labour, to a sprawling industrial metropolis of textile factories. The first mill, Lees Hall, was built by William Clegg in about 1778. Within a year, 11 other mills had been constructed, but by 1818 there were only 19 of these privately owned mills.

It was in the second half of the 19th century, that Oldham became the world centre for spinning cotton yarn. This was due in a large part to the formation of limited liability companies known as Oldham Limiteds. In 1851, over 30% of Oldham's population was employed within the textile sector, compared to 5% across Great Britain. At its zenith, it was the most productive cotton spinning mill town in the world. By 1871 Oldham had more spindles than any country in the world except the United States, and in 1909, was spinning more cotton than France and Germany combined. By 1911 there were 16.4 million spindles in Oldham, compared with a total of 58 million in the United Kingdom and 143.5 million in the world; in 1928, with the construction of the UK's largest textile factory Oldham reached its manufacturing zenith. At its peak, there were over 360 mills, operating night and day;

Gorse No.2 Mill, was planned in 1911 and was built by P.S.Stott completed in 1914. It was used for aircraft manufacture during the 1914–18 War. It started spinning cotton in 1919 for the Ace Mill Ltd, who renamed it, the Ace Mill.

The cotton industry peaked in 1912 when it produced 8 billion yards of cloth. The great war halted the supply of raw cotton, and the British government encouraged its colonies to build mills to spin and weave cotton. The war over, Lancashire never regained its markets. The independent mills were struggling. The Bank of England set up the Lancashire Cotton Corporation in 1929 to attempt to rationalise and save the industry. Ace Mill, Hollinwood was one of 104 mills bought by the LCC, and one of the 53 mills that survived through to 1950. The mill was closed by Courtaulds in 1967.

== Architecture ==
The 5 storey mill, has a floor area of 38,500 sq ft (3,580 m^{2}). It was designed by P.S.Stott.

=== Power ===
It was powered by a 2500 hp cross compound engine (Mary and Elizabeth) by Urmson and Thompson built in 1920. It had a 26 ft (7.9 m) flywheel with 42 ropes that ran at 64rpm.

=== Equipment ===
This was a mule mill with 118,032 spindles in 1919.

== Usage ==
It is now used as a warehouse.

=== Owners ===
- Ace Mill Company (1919)
- Lancashire Cotton Corporation (1930s–1964)
- Courtaulds (1964–1967)
- Nettle Accessories (latter known as Delta MEM), manufacturers of electrical accessories (1970s–2004)

== See also ==
- Textile manufacturing
- Cotton Mill

== Bibliography ==
- Dunkerley, Philip (2009). "Dunkerley-Tuson Family Website, The Regent Cotton Mill, Failsworth". Archived from the original on 12 February 2009.
- LCC (1951). The mills and organisation of the Lancashire Cotton Corporation Limited. Blackfriars House, Manchester: Lancashire Cotton Corporation Limited.
- Gurr, Duncan; Hunt, Julian (1998), The Cotton Mills of Oldham, Oldham Education & Leisure, ISBN 0-902809-46-6, archived from the original on 18 July 2011
- Roberts, A S (1921), "Arthur Robert's Engine List", Arthur Roberts Black Book., One guy from Barlick-Book Transcription, archived from the original on 23 July 2011
