= Edward Potts (architect) =

British architect (1839–1909)

Edward Potts (2 March 1839 – 15 April 1909) was an architect who practised in Oldham, Lancashire, England.

== Biography ==
Potts was born on 2 March 1839 in Bury, Lancashire. He moved to Oldham and designed many of the town's Cotton mills and was ranked with P. S. Stott as the greatest mill architect of Victorian Lancashire. Potts and his partnerships were responsible for the design and build of 200 mills, sixteen of which were in Oldham. One such mill is Textile Mill, Chadderton built in 1882.

Mills of this period were constructed with fireproof floors. These were principally triple brick arches, but Potts pioneered the use of 7" thick concrete floors. On 3 March 1884 he attempted to patent this new method of constructing fireproof floors and ceilings. The patent was rejected, and it was rapidly adopted by other architects. The seven inch floor was more rigid than a 12" brick floor, so preserved the alignment of the spinning mules, thus saving power. However the concrete floor however required a closer grouping of supporting columns, which restricted the size of the machines. To solve this, he introduced transverse steel girders into the design, supported on steel lintels above the windows. Thus there was no lateral thrust on the walls, and the windows became square headed and abnormally wide.

Potts moved to Eccles in 1891 and was responsible for the design of the town's library. He was a Liberal member of Eccles borough council from 1902 to 1905, the first chairman of the town's library committee in 1904 and a Justice of the Peace in 1906. He inaugurated popular Saturday night concerts during the winter months, and, keen to reduce the incidence of infant mortality, gave a sovereign to the mother of every child who reached the age of one.

He died on 15 April 1909 and was buried at Chadderton Cemetery.

== Partnerships ==
- Woodhouse & Potts (1860–1872)
- Independent architect (1872–1880)
- Potts, Pickup & Dixon (1880–1890), Manchester office from 1882
- Potts, Son & Henning, Manchester, Oldham, and Bolton (1890–1907)

== See also ==
- List of mills in Chadderton
