= Eric Noi =

British boxer

Personal information
- Nationality: British
- Born: 12 May 1967 (age 59) Moss Side, Greater Manchester, England, United Kingdom
- Height: 5 ft 11 in (1.80 m)
- Weight: Super Middleweight

Boxing career
- Stance: Orthodox

Boxing record
- Total fights: 10
- Wins: 9
- Win by KO: 5
- Losses: 1
- Draws: 0
- No contests: 0

Eric Noi is a former Super Middleweight boxer from Moss Side, Manchester.

== Early life ==
Eric's family roots can be traced to Ghana. He is the second youngest of nine children, whose father died when he was two, Eric worked his way through Queen Elizabeth School in Middleton and his natural skills and ability at science and chemistry took him to Manchester University.

== Boxing career ==
He was part of the 1992 Olympic boxing squad. He represented England at amateur level all over Europe, fought for his country in the amateur world championships in Romania, where he reached the quarter finals.

His first professional bout was on 05/02/1993 vs Tim Robinson which he won by way of TKO. He retired from boxing on 24 November 1995 after his fight against John Duckworth at Bowlers Arena Manchester where he beat John Duckworth on points.

He was ranked in the top ten super middleweights in the country when a shoulder injury forced him out of professional boxing.

== Career after Boxing ==
Eric grew up on Langley estate in Middleton and became a councillor in the town for 2 years.

Eric now runs a gym at Victoria House, Greaves street, Oldham; Oldham Boxing & Personal Development Centre and has been nominated for a BeMOBO award for his hard work in the community.
