= Frederick Whittaker Dixon =

British architect (1854–1935)

Frederick Whittaker Dixon (1854–1935) was an architect practising in Oldham, Lancashire.

== Life and work ==
He worked as a partner in Oldham company Potts, Pickup & Dixon (run by fellow Methodists) from 1880 to around 1889 when he set up his own practice. In 1906 Dixon's son Ernest joined the practice and it became F. W. Dixon & Son. By that time Frederick Dixon had built 12 cotton mills in Oldham.

In his early mills Dixon used yellow brick to decorate the facades. His later mills used pronounced piers or buttresses between the windows, extending unbroken from the ground to the parapet. The water tower designs drew from a variety of architectural styles.

The Dixons designed 22 mills in Oldham containing 1.8 million spindles, making him responsible for about 30% of the capacity increase at that time.

He also designed chapels such as the one for the Swedenborgians in Failsworth and the Primitive Methodists in Chadderton.

From 1896 Dixon lived in (and travelled to Oldham from) Southport, Lancashire. He became prominent in the town's politics, serving as mayor and Justice of the Peace in the borough.

== Works ==
- Hyson Green Methodist Free Church 1895
- John Petty Memorial Chapel, York
