= Oldham Limiteds =

British cotton manufacturing companies

Oldham Limiteds were the 154 cotton manufacturing companies founded to build or operate cotton mills in Oldham in northwest England, and predominantly during the joint-stock boom of 1873–1875.

== History ==
Oldham was late in coming to cotton, and did not have many large privately owned mills, such as would be found in Manchester or Bolton. It did have many small companies that worked out of Room and power mills. Oldham was an early and enthusiastic participant in the co-operative movement. In the 1850s Oldham saw the expansion of friendly and building societies, sick and funeral clubs, and cooperative stores. These societies, along with the Limited Liability Act 1855 and Joint Stock Companies Act 1856, laid the foundation for the popularity of limited liability companies. The pioneer company was the Oldham Building and Manufacturing Co. Ltd., formed by skilled workers who sought to gain a greater equality of income and wealth through cooperation. Having shares in the company was seen as a form of profit sharing, and indeed by about 1875, about 75 percent of mill workers held shares in the limiteds. That is 20% of Oldham's population.

=== Sun Mill, Chadderton ===
Sun Mill, Chadderton was built between 1860 and 1862 by a company which was founded in 1858 by members of the Oldham Industrial Co-operative Society. Following the principles of the Rochdale Pioneers, William Marcroft gave the new company a democratic structure designed to foster the principles of producer co-operation and employee control. Management of the company was by means of elected committees. The limited liability principle, to which the co-operators also subscribed following the Joint Stock Companies Act 1856 and the Companies Act 1862, was seen as an adjunct of co-operation.

Sun Mill was originally built to accommodate 60,000 spindles, three times the average number then found in local mills. The Oldham Building Co. later became the Sun Mill Co. Ltd, and extended the mill to 142,000 spindles. The Sun Mill Company is credited as being the first of the Oldham Limiteds. The share holders were skilled workers at the mill, and though in fact, they had little involvement in running the company, They received a dividend of over 12%.

=== The 1873–75 boom ===
Workers were active investing in the first wave of expansion of the limiteds between 1870 and 1873, and the wave of 1873–75. Many of the new companies were conversions of failing private concerns. When the boom ended a hundred companies had been created. An average worker could earn about £1.75 a week (35 shillings). A share could be bought for £5.00. Workers would buy shares in their own company and maybe another mill to balance the risk. Companies' capital consisted of loan finance as well as equity subscriptions, generally in equal proportions. Workers were virtually guaranteed to earn more in dividend (always over 5%) than in a saving bank. Shares were traded over tables in local public houses and Oldham had its own stock exchange. It was in the workers' interest to ensure that the mill was profitable so they received the largest dividend. When in 1875, there was a change in conditions of service of textile workers from the pay scale called the 1872 Oldham list, to the 1875 Oldham list the transition went smoothly, as the dividend was an important incentive. Wage rates climbed and costs were recouped by using inferior cotton. William Ewart Gladstone, is quoted as saying in 1867, that the working class had become "an association of small capitalists employing other work people."

=== Oldham counts ===
Lancashire was renowned for the production of the finest, in other words, thinnest, cotton yarn. When the Oldham Limiteds started to expand their output, they competed by spinning coarse yarn. The grade of cotton is measured by its count. This refers to the number of hanks of 840 yards that collectively weigh 1 lb. 1-40 is called a coarse count in the United Kingdom; 40-80 is a medium count and 80 to 160 is fine. Consequently an Oldham count is a count between 1 and 40. In the United States, the terms are used differently.

=== Future investment ===
There were two other booms, 1883–84 and 1889–90. In all, from 1858–96, Oldham formed 154 limiteds, or more than twice as many as found in Bolton. The only other part of the textile industry where the limited company had the same hold as in Oldham was the Irish linen trade. Company voting was on the egalitarian method of one man one vote. They could be ruthless dismissing the whole board if they were seen to be under-performing.

The Depression of 1890–1896, when the stock market index dropped for 48 months strained the working-class capitalist system. Trade unions which never had a hold in Oldham offered more security than share ownership. The boards of the Oldham Limiteds became more secretive and the cooperative principle was abandoned. In 1893, the Brooklands Lockout had been resolved. Wage negotiations passed from the individual mill to agreements between the professional negotiators of the principal unions and the employers federation.

Maintaining the dividend became a priority and mills were starved of capital investment. The good times peaked in 1926, and because Oldham had specialised in the coarse counts it was far more vulnerable than other Lancashire towns to competition from the emerging Indian and Japanese industries.

== See also ==
- History of Oldham

== Bibliography ==
- Ellison, Thomas (1886). The cotton trade of Great Britain. E.Wilson. p. 80. ISBN 0-7146-1391-6.
- Proctor; Toms (2000). "Industrial Relations and Technical Change: Profits, Wages and Costs in the Lancashire Cotton Industry, 1880–1914" (PDF). Journal of Industrial History.
- Cottrell, P.J. (1980). Industrial Finance, 1830–1914.
- Farnie, D.A. (1979), The English Cotton Industry and the World Market 1815-1896., Clarendon Press, ISBN 0-19-822478-8
- Huberman, Michael (1999). "Shame and Guilt in Lancashire: Enforcing Piece Rate Contracts" (PDF). Montréal.
- Thomas (2005). Provincial Stock Exchanges. Taylor & Francis. ISBN 0-415-38265-3.
