= List of mills in Stockport =

This list of mills in Stockport, lists textile factories that have existed in Stockport, Greater Manchester, England.

From the Industrial Revolution until the 20th century, Stockport was a major centre of textile manufacture, particularly cotton spinning and hat making. During this period, the valleys of the River Mersey, River Tame and their tributaries were dominated by large rectangular brick-built factories, many of which still remain today as warehouses or converted for residential or retail use.

== Standing mills in Stockport ==
Name	Architect	Location	Built	Demolished	Served (Years)
(Adcroft) Hat Works		Manor		Standing	
Aqueduct Mill		Marple North, 53°24′24″N 2°04′03″W		Standing	
Avondale Works		Edgeley & Cheadle			
Battersby Hat Works		Manor			
Belmont Works		Brinnington & Central			
Botany Mill see Wellington Works		Bredbury , 53°25′50″N 2°06′07″W			
Brinksway Leather Works		Edgeley & Cheadle SJ879899 53°24′21″N 2°10′53″W			
	Notes: three-storey hipped roof with short circular brick chimney				
Brinksway Bank Mill		Edgeley & Cheadle 53°24′28″N 2°10′27″W			
	Notes: A 50,000-spindle three-storey mill in existence in 1872. It was run by Samuel Moorhouse, who in 1891 had 20,000 spindles: then it became part of the Fine Spinners and Doublers Association.				
Brinksway Mill a.k.a. Heaward's Mill		Edgeley & Cheadle SJ884899 53°24′22″N 2°10′26″W			
	Notes: North of the river was a four-storey mill with water tower at east corner: there was a three-storey extension. The chimney was octagonal. There are traces of a weir sluice and mill race. South of the river was a three-storey mill. The first mill north of the River Mersey was in existence in 1790. It was worked from 1870 by J&G Walthew. In 1891 John and George Walthew, (together with Wellington and Springmount Mills) had 116,960 spindles. It became part of the Fine Spinners and Doublers Association in 1930.				
Britannia Mill		Reddish South 53°25′19″N 2°09′55″W		Standing	
	Notes: A weaving mill in use 1870s to 1930s, manufacturing shirtings and towels. 100–200 looms. Occupied by Reuben Fildes, the Robert Atkinson & Co and McKay Mills & Co.				
Broadhurst Street Hatworks		Davenport & Cale Green			
Broadstone Mill		Reddish South SJ 892,930 53°26′02″N 2°09′50″W	1903	Standing	56
	Notes: A double mill with twin chimneys, only one mill survives.				
Canal Street Hat/Box Factory		Brinnington & Central			
Carringtons Hat Works		Davenport & Cale Green			
Chadkirk Mill		Bredbury Green & Romiley			
Cheadle (Bleach) Works		Cheadle & Gatley SJ854890 53°23′53″N 2°13′16″W			
	Notes: Cheadle Lower Mill, often called Cheadle Bleachworks, and now renamed, The Bleachworks, is on a site used for this purpose since the 12th century.				
Churchgate Mill		Lavender's Brow, Brinnington & Central 53°24′33″N 2°09′12″W	1828	Standing	198
	Notes: Built by 1828, later mill on site 3-storey. In 1880s spinning sewing and knitting yarn. in 1891 Samuel Bunting and Co had (together with Newbridge Lane Mill) 16,000 spindles.				
Compstall Bridge Works		Marple North			
Compstall Mill		Marple North			
	Notes: 1891-George Andrew and Sons, 56,162 spindles and 1,100 looms.				
Demmings Bleaching Works		Cheadle & Gatley			
East Bank Mill		Carrington Road, Brinnington & Central			
	Notes: 1891-William Wilkinson and Sons, 2000 spindles				
Goyt Mill, Bredbury		Brinnington, Bredbury border SJ910910 53°24′57″N 2°08′13″W	1840	1981	141
	Notes: Main building parallel to the river was a four-storey brick-built non-fireproof construction. There were 2 rows of cast-iron columns and iron roof ties. The five-storey extension was 100 ft by 120 ft with three rows of cast-iron columns. It was purchased by Isaac Pearson around 1890. Taken over by Fine Cotton Spinners and Doublers Association.				
Goyt Mill, Hawk Green, Marple	Stott and Sons	Marple South 53°23′07″N 2°03′54″W	1905	Standing	55
	Notes: Goyt Mill was built in 1905 by Jonathan Partington of Middleton for the Goyt Spinning Company, to a design by Stott and Sons. It is a six-storey with a total floor area 260,000 sq.ft. on its 6 floors. It had 82,000 mule spindles and 45,000 ring spindles, spinning 24 and 38 twist and 22 and 46 mule weft. All the machinery was by John Hetherington & Sons of Ancoats. The 165 carding engines, 25 draw frames, 26 intermediate frames, 50 roving frames were on the bottom two floors, the 30 pairs of mules were on the top three floors. It employed 480 mill staff and 12 office staff. The engine was a Carel Frères 2500 IHP condensing drop valve, cross compound (5ft 3in stroke, 27in and 63in bore). There were six Lancashire boilers with the firing end facing the Macclesfield Canal. The coal for its engine was supplied from the mines at Poynton and in Staffordshire. It was supplied directly to the boiler by a steam crane. The mill is now in multiple use.				
Hallam Mill a.k.a. Heaviley Mill		Davenport & Cale			
	Notes: 1891-Ephraim Hallam. The former Squirrel Sweet Works. Home of a photo studio.				
Hampstead Mill		Stepping Hill			
Heapriding Mill		Edgeley & Cheadle SJ886902 53°24′31″N 2°10′15″W			
	Notes: A six-storey mill and weaving shed, that had 10,000 mule spindles in 1909. Occupied by John Greaves Son & Co in 1872 and John Edward Clegg in 1887. In 1891 Clegg had 6000 spindles and Samuel Holland 300 spindles.				
Hempshaw Lane Works		Manor			
	Notes: 1891- George Hooley and Son				
Hopes Carr Hatworks		Brinnington & Central			
Houldsworth Mill	Abraham Stott	Reddish North	1865	Standing	161
	Notes: Grade II* listed				
Kershaws Tannery		Brinnington & Central			
Kingston Mill		Chestergate, Edgeley & Cheadle 53°24′31″N 2°10′09″W			
	Notes: 1891-Lucas Micholls, and Co, 33460 spindles				
Lancashire Hill Ropery		Reddish South 53°25′19″N 2°09′50″W		Standing	
	Notes: Reuben Rivett used it in the 1880 to make main drive ropes, later it was occupied by the Lancashire Hill Rope & Twine Co Ltd.				
Lincoln Bennett Hat Works		Edgeley & Cheadle			
Lockside Mill		Marple North SJ926890 53°23′53″N 2°06′47″W	1801	Standing	225
	Notes: Now called Lockside Mill, this canal side warehouse was built in 1801 by Samuel Oldknow. It is a three-storey 7- by 3-bay stone-built building with internal canal arm parallel to the canal, with cart entrance on the first floor. It is on the top pound of Lock 9, by lock 10.				
Lower Carrs Mill		Brinnington & Central SJ 898902 53°24′32″N 2°09′18″W	1800		175
	Notes: There were three mills built by Samuel Oldknow on Hopes Carr.In 1891 Samuel Bunting and Co had 13,926 spindles. Lower Carr Mill:Built before 1900 on site of former silk mill. A room and power mill in the early 19th century. An earlier 5-storey mill built over Carr Brook, with a mill dam to the south. It was 30 ft wide, and cast-iron pillars added to support the floor. A later 5-storey mill(1826) to the west, parallel to Hopes Carr, This is 80 ft long by 35 ft wide with cast-iron pillars in the centre at 9 ft intervals. Middle Carr Mill: Upper Carr Mill: Stockport Navigation: was a short canal/reservoir that was built here on the Carr Brook to improve the flow to the water mills. The scheme involved a steep embankment at the top end, and a siphon under Waterloo Road. Stockport Aircrash 1964: This happened at this point in Hopes Carr.				
Marriot Street Mill		Brinnington & Central 53°24′13″N 2°09′21″W		Standing	
	Notes: Now an apartment building				
Meadow Mill		Brinnington & Central 53°25′04″N 2°09′09″W	1880	Standing	146
	Notes: Grade II listed building Owen Ashmore in The Industrial Archaeology of North-west England (1982) lists this as Meadow Mill (not Valley Mills). Circa 1880 built for T & J Leigh, cotton and wool spinning. Had 120,000 spindles in 1914. Twin six-storey brick built mills with ornamental engine house between. Fireproof construction. Cast-iron pillars between windows on top storey. ,				
New Mill		Reddish North			
Oak Street Shed		Hazel Grove			
Oakwood Mill		Bredbury Green & Romiley			
	Notes: Tipping and Plant, 34,000 spindles.				
Pear New Mill	A.H. Stott, P S Stott	Bredbury 53°24′50″N 2°08′03″W	1912	Standing	66
	Notes: A Grade II* listed building Pear Mill, Stockport, was an Edwardian mill, one of the last cotton spinning mills to be built, commencing production in July 1913. The architects were A.H. Stott & Sons and the building is typical of their work. It was constructed with concrete floors, and meticulous detailing. The power was provided by a Manhattan type steam engine by George Saxon & Co. Transmission was by rope drives. The mill had 137,312 mule spindles which remained until the 1950s when they were replaced by 33,636 ring spindles, the mill being electrified at the same time. It ceased operation as a textile mill in March 1978				
Portwood Hatworks		Brinnington & Central			
Primrose Mill		Mellor SJ 899911 53°24′03″N 2°01′55″W	1780	1961	181
	Notes: Was built as a Fulling Mill in 1780, enlarged in the 1820s and used as a cotton spinning mill. It was finally used eventually used for spinning and weaving gas mantles. It was burnt down in 1961, the site is used commercially by Marple Polymer Processors				
Reddish Spinning Co., Victoria Mill (North mill)		North Reddish 53°26′24″N 2°09′55″W	1870	Standing	156
	Notes: Built by the said company in 1870, which became part of the Fine Cotton Spinners and Doublers Association in 1898. Together the mills had 133,000 mule spindles in 1909. The north mill had four storeys and with cast-iron pillars. Water and stair tower at SE corner joins the middle mill. The mules were supplied by Dobson & Barlow including 40 hand mules. They produced fine and super fine counts. In 2010 marketed as apartments, in Houldsworth Village development				
Reddish Spinning Co., Elisabeth Mill (Middle Mill)		North Reddish 53°26′21″N 2°09′55″W	1870	Standing	156
	Notes: Built by the said company in 1870, which became part of the Fine Cotton Spinners and Doublers Association in 1898. Together the mills had 133,000 mule spindles in 1909. The middle mill had four storeys and with 6 rows of cast-iron pillars, 17 pillars in a row. Powered by a 500 hp, horizontal John Musgrave & Sons engine- produced fine to super fine counts. In 2010 marketed as apartments, in Houldsworth Village development				
Reddish Spinning Co., (South mill)		North Reddish 53°26′20″N 2°09′57″W			
	Notes: A two-storey + cellar mill with 5 rows of cast-iron columns				
Reynolds Mill a.k.a. Cromer Street Mill		Brinnington & Central, Portwood 53°24′48″N 2°08′41″W			
	Notes:				
Shaw Heath Mill a.k.a. Holland's Mill		Shaw Heath, Brinnington & Central		2007	
	Notes: 1891-Shaw Heath Mills Co Ltd, 8000 spindles 2007-Demolished after storm damage.				
Sovereign Works		Edgeley & Cheadle			
Springmount Mill; Brinksway Bank Bleach and Printworks		Edgeley & Cheadle 53°24′22″N 2°10′45″W			
	Notes: A three-storey mill, with 2-storey extension. A five-storey mill with arched brick windows and stair tower to south with cast-iron water tank above. Separate boiler house with round chimney. Later three-storey buildings on Brinksway. 1891-John and George Walthew, (together with Wellington and Brinksway Mills) 116,960 spindles. Taken over by Fine Cotton Spinners and Doublers Association. Demolished May and June 2018				
Spur Mill		Reddish South 53°25′46″N 2°09′40″W	1907	Standing	65
	Notes: A 1907, single-storey doubling mill with 20,000 spindles. Closed in 1972				
Swallow Mill		Brinnington & Central			
T W Bracher Leather		Brinnington & Central			
Thorn Works		Bredbury			
Throstle Grove Mill		Manor SJ 894907 53°24′47″N 2°09′40″W	1820	1870	50
	Notes: Ralph Orrell Spinning				
Unity Mills		Poleacre Lane, Woodley 53°25′59″N 2°05′38″W			
	Notes:				
Valley Mill		Hazel Grove			
Vernon Mill		Portwood, Brinnington & Central 53°24′51″N 2°08′45″W		Standing	
	Notes: Graces Guide 1891 Portwood; 150,000 spindles, 45'/55' weft, 30'/42' twist. Grade II listed building 1891-Vernon Cotton Spinning Co, Stockport, Ltd, 150,000 spindles				
Victoria Dye Works		Hempshaw lane, Manor SJ907895 53°24′07″N 2°08′28″W			
	Notes: Documented from the late 19th century. 1891-Oswald Hazeldine (dyer and sizer)				
Victoria Mill		South Reddish 53°25′50″N 2°09′40″W			
	Notes: Four-storey. For the Victoria Mill in North Reddish see: Reddish Spinning Co., Victoria Mill (North mill)				
Virginia Mills		Manor SJ 899892 53°24′00″N 2°09′11″W		Standing	
	Notes: Two-storey building on Hillgate. Documented in 1872				
Waterloo Mill		Brinnington & Central			
	Notes: 1891-John Reynolds, 4,000 spindles				
Wear Mill a.k.a. Weir Mill		Edgeley & Cheadle 53°24′32″N 2°09′57″W	1884	Standing	142
	Notes: Grade II listed building 1891-Thomas Fernley and Sons, 60,000 spindles				
Welkin Mill		Bredbury 53°25′10″N 2°08′04″W		Standing	
	Notes: Grade II listed building				
Wellington Mill		Wellington Road South Brinnington & Central 53°24′31″N 2°09′44″W		Standing	
	Notes: Grade II listed building Wellington Mill, a.k.a. Wellington Bridge Mill, was originally an early fireproof cotton spinning mill built in 1830–1831. In 1891 John and George Walthew, (together with Springmount and Brinksway Mills) had 116,960 spindles. Became a hat works in the 1890s. From 2000 it has housed the Hat Works museum.				
Wellington Works (formally Botany Mill)		Woodley, Bredbury 53°25′50″N 2°06′07″W		Standing	
	Notes: Now Morrell's paint works				
Wood Mill, Woodley		Woodley, Stockport 53°25′57″N 2°06′08″W		1964	
	Notes:				

== Other mills ==
Name	Architect	Location	Built	Demolished	Served (Years)
Albert		South Reddish 53°25′36″N 2°09′43″W	1845		181
	Notes: A four-storey mill built by Robert Hyde Greg. In 1911 it had 50,000 spindles				
Albion Mill		Hazel Grove			
	Notes:				
Alligator see: Beehive		53°24′59″N 2°09′13″W			
Bankside aka Bankfield aka Halliday's Bleach and Dye Works		Reddish Newtown 53°25′15″N 2°09′37″W			
	Notes: Bankfield mill was 6-storey mill, using water from the Reddish Canal for its condensor.				
Beehive		Portwood 53°24′59″N 2°09′13″W			
	Notes: A collection of seven mills which were owned by T & J Leigh in 1872.There was an earlier mill on this site known as Brewery Mill, then: North East mill:- 6-storeys with water tower at SW corner.; Three-storey mill on Brewery St.; Three-storey mill to the south; North-west Mill:-A four-storey mill on Marsland St; Two-storey office block on Water St.; Alligator Mill:- 6 storeys. Occupied by the Alligator Rainwear Company until 1978; Mill to east:- 4 storeys; The site is now occupied by Tesco				
Brewery Street see Beehive		53°24′59″N 2°09′13″W			
California Mill		Joules Court, Stockport 53°24′26″N 2°09′11″W			
	Notes: Brick built 2-storey, in use from 1858 to 1890s. In 1880s used for waste spinning and candlewicks. In 1891 it was occupied by Thomas Brandreth with 180 spindles.				
California Mills		Stockport			
	Notes: 1891- J. and W.H. Lomas, 500 spindles, T. Marsland and Son, 900 spindles and J.W. and J.G. Davies, with 312 spindles				
Cataract Bridge Mill		Longhurst Lane, Mellor, Stockport 53°23′47″N 2°02′47″W		Standing	
	Notes: In 2010 redundant, planning application pending for conversion to housing.				
Coronation		Newtown Reddish 53°25′18″N 2°09′44″W			
	Notes: Occupied by J&T Read in 1872. Occupied by Balfe and Co. (doublers) in 1891 who, together with West Gorton Mill, had 6,500 spindles. 1900-John Whittaker & Son. Backing onto the Reddish Canal it had 35,000 spindles.				
Crow Park		Portwood SJ 899911 53°25′01″N 2°09′11″W	1833		193
	Notes: A fireproof mill built of brick in 1833, it is six storeys plus basement and attic.The main rooms are 120 ft by 48 to 50 ft. The brick archeded floors are supported by cast-iron beams carried on two rows of cast-iron pillars, set 9 ft apart. Shafting was carried on brackets attached to the beams. The engine house was separate to the west of the mill. There was an earlier mill (Crow Park Wing Mill) believed to be 6 or 7 storeys that was narrower, having one row of pillars and cast-iron beams.				
Dysart Street Shed		Great Moor SJ909882 53°23′28″N 2°08′17″W			
	Notes: Producing towelling in 1909 from 100 looms				
Edgeley					
Elder		Romiley, Marple 53°24′41″N 2°05′47″W			
	Notes: Elder Mill was powered by a 600 hp vertical cross compound engine by Daniel Adamson, installed in 1937. It had a 3 ft stroke. It ran at 106 rpm. The flywheel was 16 ft.				
Faulder's aka Warren Street Mill		53°24′49″N 2°09′18″W		1989	
	Notes: Rebuilt after a fire in 1871. Acquired in the 1890s by Henry Faulder & Co for use as a cocoa and chocolate factory.				
Foggbrook					
Gorsey Bank		Higher Brinksway SJ878899 53°24′21″N 2°10′58″W			
	Notes: Main mill is two storeys plus basement, featuring 5 rows of cast-iron columns, flat roof with parapet. Second mill to the east, brick built three-storey mill with basement. It was powered by a 1908, 400 hp horizontal tandem compound engine by J & E Wood of Bolton. Lancashire boiler by Galloways of Manchester with Greens economiser and flue to octagonal chimney. 1891-Gorsey Bank Doubling Co, 12,000 spindles				
Hanover Mills		Reddish 53°25′41″N 2°09′41″W	1865		161
	Notes: Hanover Mill was built in 1865 for cotton spinning and doubling by Heywards, but in 1889 was converted to make silk, velvet, woven fur etc.				
Heaton Mersey Works					
Hollins Mill		Stockport Road, Marple		1957	
	Notes: Built early 1800s for Charles Walmsley c.1860 Bought by Samuel Hodgkinson and the Carver family 1954-Closed down 1957-Demolished				
Hope					
India		Heaton Mersey SJ 888903 53°24′35″N 2°10′04″W			
	Notes: A combined mill. In 1891 it was occupied by Kershaw, Leese and Co with 89,700 spindles. In 1909 it had 90,000 spindles and 1800 looms.				
Lancashire Hill Mill see Rivett's Mill					
Logwood			1732		294
	Notes: An early silk throwing mill. It was one of the first three silk throwing mills in the UK, set up by John Guardivaglio in 1732. It was built in the park, with the blessing of Lord Warren on the site of a logwood mill, that ground logwood to create dyestuffs. Twelve years later they dammed the Carr Brook (tin Brook) to build a further mill, and then another at the confluence of the Carr Brook and the River Mersey. There were 2000 silk throwing workers by 1760.These early silk mills built up a labour force accustomed to factory work- that was on hand for cotton in the 1780s				
Mellor Mill		Marple SJ970878 53°23′13″N 2°02′49″W	1793	1892	99
	Notes: This was a six-storey, 42 feet wide and 210 feet long mill with additional 3-storey wings making it 400 ft in all. The mill was built for Samuel Oldknow and used to spin coarse counts. It was originally driven by the Wellington water wheel. The River Goyt, and with it the then county boundary between Derbyshire and Cheshire was diverted and a weir built, the leat fed a millpond that in later times was named the Roman Lakes. This in turn fed a second mill pond along with water from reservoir in Linnet Clough. Supplementary power was provided by a second exterior wheel known as the Waterloo wheel.The Mill reached its peak production in 1804, when 10,080 spindles were operating and around 550 people were employed. In 1891 it was occupied by John Clayton and Co Ltd with 26,656 spindles. It was destroyed by fire in 1892.				
Middle Mill see Reddish Spinning Co		Houldsworth Street, Reddish, SJ891937 53°26′24″N 2°09′58″W	1874		152
Newbridge Lane					
	Notes: 1891-Charles Cheetham and Co, (together with Churchgate Mill) 16,000 spindles; Lowe and Unsworth (waste); Scott Bros, 198 looms; G. H. Swallow				
Newbridge Mill		Stockport			
	Notes: 1891-Milne J. Stott, 15,400 spindles				
Newbridge Mills		Stockport			
	Notes: 1891-Henry Marriott and Co (bleachers or dyers)				
North Mill see Reddish Spinning Co.,		Reddish, SJ891937 53°26′24″N 2°09′58″W	1870		156
Orrell's Mill a.k.a. Travis Brook Mill		Travis Street, Heaton Norris SJ 886903 53°24′32″N 2°10′23″W	1834		192
	Notes: A Grade II listed building.. A historical significant mill that was used as a principal example in Andrew Ure's book. It pioneered the use of the cast-iron I-beam. It was built by William Fairbairn for Ralph Orrell. Originally a six-storey combined mill 280 ft by 50 ft, with side wings. It was designed to house 125,000 throstle and 33,000 mule spindles. Later in 1891 it was recorded as being occupied by Robert M'Clure and Sons, with 140,000 spindles and 993 looms The original beam engine was replaced around 1912, and a new separate engine house built. At this time a rope race was added to the mill to replace the former fixed vertical main shaft. It was damaged by fire in the 1960s, and one storey was removed, and was demolished in the ?1980s.				
Palmer Mills		Portwood 53°24′52″N 2°08′48″W			
	Notes: 1891- Palmer Mills Co, Limited, 167,000 spindles				
Reddish Mills see Houldsworth's Mill					
Reddish Vale Printworks		Reddish Vale 53°26′11″N 2°08′39″W			
	Notes: Started before 1800 by James Fletcher a calico printer. In 1840, Becker Bros & Co had 4 printing machines and 118 block printing tables. Taken over by Bradshaw, Hammond & Co in 1862 and then the Calico Printers' Association in 1899. It was originally drive by water taken by a race from the River Tame. Later there was a central engine house, and a reservoir for condensing.				
Rivett's a.k.a. Lancashire Hill Mill		Lancashire Hill, Heaton Norris 53°25′16″N 2°09′48″W			
	Notes: Thomas Rivett in 1887, then Joseph Rivett & Sons until taken over by the Fine Cotton Spinners and Doublers Association. It had an Octagonal Brick Chimney, was a three-storey mill with an open cast-iron water tank.				
Springbank					
Springfield		Longshut Lane SJ 897894 53°24′04″N 2°09′22″W			
	Notes: 1891-Barker and Co Ltd; In 1897 this single-storey mill was weaving towelling on 260 looms				
Squirrel Works					
Stockport Ring Mills		Heaton Norris 53°24′26″N 2°10′39″W			
	Notes: Three mills 1892–1911 that ran 200,000 spindles.: No 1 Mill : three-storey brick built with boiler house and circular chimney; No 2 Mill : five-storey brick built mill large engine house and twin boiler house. A north side tower with white lettering.; No 3 Mill : two-storey; Became part of Lancashire Cotton Corporation, but sold by 1951				
Strines Print Works		Strines, Marple 53°22′35″N 2°02′23″W			
	Notes: Acquired by the Calico Printers' Association in 1899.				
Top Mill		Bredbury & Woodley			
Travis Brook Mill see Orrell's Mill		Travis Street, Heaton Norris 53°24′32″N 2°10′23″W			
	Notes: A Grade II listed building.				
Wards Hat Factory					
Waterloo Road Mill					
