= Welkin Mill, Lower Bredbury =

Cotton spinning mill in Stockport, Greater Manchester, England

Welkin Ring Mill Ark Mill
- The mill before 1951

- Location in Greater Manchester

Spinning (ring mill)
- Location: Lower Bredbury, Stockport, England
- Further ownership: Lancashire Cotton Corporation (1930s); Courtaulds (1964)
- Coordinates: 53.4194°N 2.1344°W

Welkin Mill, Lower Bredbury is a cotton spinning mill in Lower Bredbury/Portwood, Stockport, Greater Manchester. It was built in the early years of the 20th century for ring spinning. It was taken over by the Lancashire Cotton Corporation in the 1930s and passed to Courtaulds in 1964. Production ended in 1967. The 162,000 sq ft (15,100 m^{2}), four-storey mill occupies a 5.15 acres (2.08 ha) site on Welkin Road.

== Location ==
Welkin Mill, is in the valley of the River Goyt, within the Metropolitan Borough of Stockport, in Greater Manchester, England, located 7.9 miles (12.7 km) south east of Manchester, 1.2 miles (1.9 km) east of Stockport and 3.2 miles (5.1 km) south west of Hyde. And used to back on to the Stockport old Sewage Works "Welkin House " (known as Welkin House, before it was demolished to move the River Goyt to make room for the motorway.

== History ==
This stretch of the Goyt, shares much of its history with Stockport whose textile tradition started with the silk industry in the late 17th century. By the 18th century the manufacture of silk was dominating the economic life of the town. Large silk mills, such as Carrs Mill, Park Mill and Adlington Square Mill, became the major employers of the town. By 1769 nearly 2,000 people were employed in the town's silk trade. In 1772 the silk industry was in depression and the town turned to cotton. Stockport was very late in embracing the joint stock limited liability company boom. The first mill to be financed by that method was Vernon Mill.

Welkin was a ring mill built in the early 20th century producing 40's to 50's.

The industry peaked in 1912 when it produced 8 billion yards of cloth. The Great War of 1914–18 halted the supply of raw cotton, and the British government encouraged its colonies to build mills to spin and weave cotton. The war over, Lancashire never regained its markets. The independent mills were struggling. The Bank of England set up the Lancashire Cotton Corporation in 1929 to attempt to rationalise and save the industry. Welkin Mill, Lower Bredbury was one of 104 mills bought by the LCC, and one of the 53 mills that survived through to 1950. Ring mill producing 40's to 50's. Housing Buckleys printers (originally called Buckley & Bland), until the firm collapsed in October 2008. It was sold on the 12 March 2009 to the Sterling Property Company for £700,000. It will be marketed, either as a whole or sub-divided, for commercial storage and warehousing rental market.

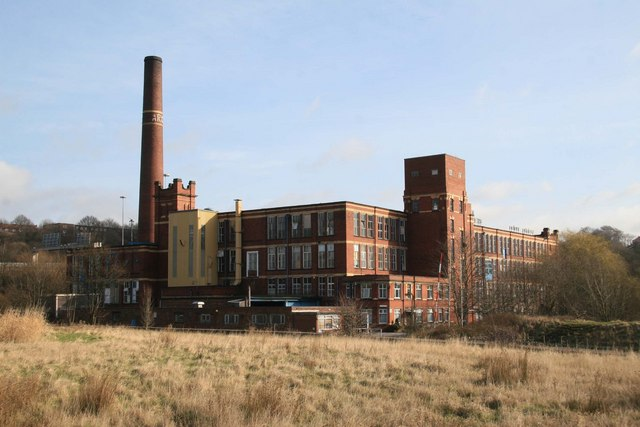
Welkin Mill in 2009.

== Usage ==
=== Owners ===
- Lancashire Cotton Corporation (1930s–1964)
- Courtaulds (1964–1967)
- Buckley and Bland Printers (1967–2002) (Name changed to Buckleys in 1989)
- Tipographic Printers (2002-2009)
- Sterling Property Company (2009– 2016)
- K2RE Limited (2016-

=== Tenants ===
- 2010-2014 Printer Trader Limited let floors 1/2/3
  2010-2012 UPS Warehouse
- K2RE LTD ( 03/2015)- Property Developer.
- moviESCAPE - Movie themed escape rooms (2016-)

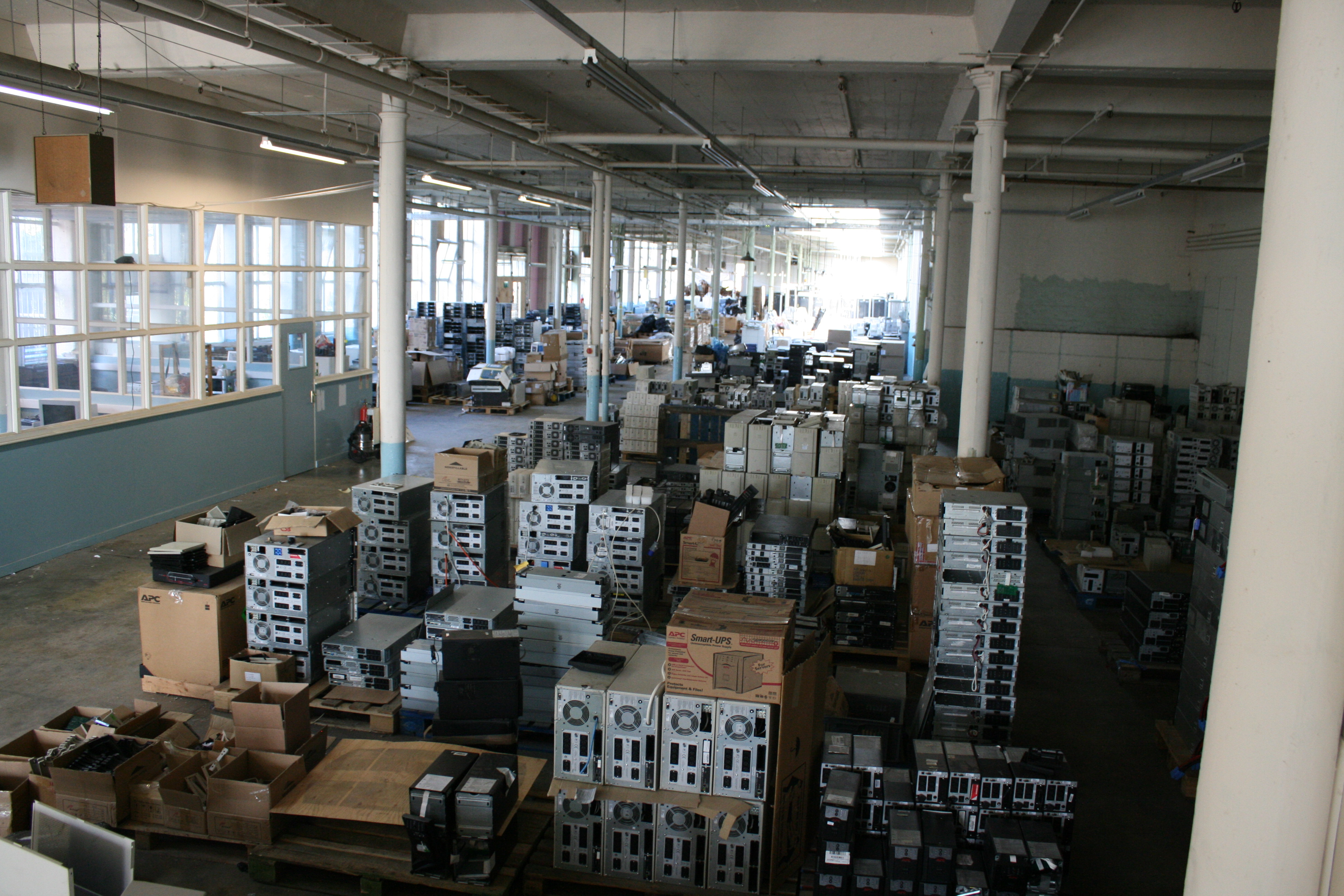
Taken Summer 2011 on the north side of the mill looking parallel to the motorway

== See also ==
- Textile manufacturing
- List of mills in Stockport
- Listed buildings in Bredbury and Romiley
- Cotton Mill

== Bibliography ==
- Dunkerley, Philip (2009). "Dunkerley-Tuson Family Website, The Regent Cotton Mill, Failsworth". Archived from the original on 23 March 2008.
- LCC (1951). The mills and organisation of the Lancashire Cotton Corporation Limited. Blackfriars House, Manchester: Lancashire Cotton Corporation Limited.
- Roberts, A S (1921), "Arthur Robert's Engine List", Arthur Roberts Black Book., One guy from Barlick-Book Transcription, archived from the original on 23 July 2011
