= Woodmill =

Woodmill may refer to:

- Sawmill
- Woodmill, Southampton, a district of Swaythling, Southampton, England
- Woodmill High School, Dunfermline, Scotland
- Woodmill (band), A Dutch Country rock band
- Wood Mill, Woodley, Stockport, Cheshire

See too:

- Woods Mill in Sussex Wildlife Trust
