= Elder Mill, Romiley =

Cotton mill in Stockport, Greater Manchester, England

Elder Mill

- Location in Greater Manchester

Spinning (ring mill)
- Location: Romiley, Stockport, Greater Manchester
- Serving canal: Peak Forest Canal
- Further ownership: Lancashire Cotton Corporation (1930s); Courtaulds (1964)
- Coordinates: 53.4114°N 2.0963°W

Construction
- Completed: Late 19th century

Power
- Engine maker: Daniel Adamson
- Engine type: 600hp
- Valve Gear: vertical cross compound engine
- Cylinder diameter and throw: 3ft
- rpm: 106
- Installed horse power (ihp): 600hp
- Flywheel diameter: 16ft

Elder Mill, Romiley was a cotton spinning mill in Romiley, Stockport, Greater Manchester. It was taken over by the Lancashire Cotton Corporation in the 1930s and passed to Courtaulds in 1964.

== Location ==
Romiley, or Chadkirk is a village within the Metropolitan Borough of Stockport, in Greater Manchester, England, located 7.9 miles (12.7 km) south east of Manchester, 5.1 kilometres (3.2 mi) east of Stockport and 4 kilometres (2.5 mi) south of Hyde. It comprises 1,089 acres (4.41 km^{2}); the surface is undulated, the soil clay, with a little sand. Coal is found at a great depth, but is not wrought; and there is a stone-quarry. Several large cotton-mills are in operation. The River Etherow here took the name of the River Mersey though today it is considered that the Etherow is a tributary of the River Goyt. The Peak Forest Canal and the Sheffield and Heybridge tramway, passed through the area. Elder mill was situated by the Peak Forest Canal near the Hatherlow Mills.

== History ==
This stretch of the Goyt, shares much of it history with Stockport whose textile tradition started with the silk industry in the late 17th Century. By the 18th century the manufacture of silk was dominating the economic life of the town. Large silk mills, such as Carrs Mill, Park Mill and Adlington Square Mill, became the major employers of the town. By 1769 nearly 2,000 people were employed in the town's silk trade. In 1772 the silk industry was in depression and the town turned to cotton. Chadkirk was known for bleaching, where finished cloth was left stretched over tenter frames over the landscape. It was bleached by the sun. Clues to this activity can be found in the place names; place names such as whitehill or whitefield. Though an important early milltown Stockport was very late in embracing the joint stock limited liability company boom. The first mill to be financed by that method was Vernon Mill. Elder Mill was such a late nineteenth century mill.

The industry peaked in 1912 when it produced 8 billion yards of cloth. The Great War of 1914–1918 halted the supply of raw cotton, and the British government encouraged its colonies to build mills to spin and weave cotton. The war over, Lancashire never regained its markets. The independent mills were struggling. The Bank of England set up the Lancashire Cotton Corporation in 1929 to attempt to rationalise and save the industry. Elder Mill, Romiley was one of 104 mills bought by the LCC, and one of the 53 mills that survived through to 1950.

== Architecture ==
=== Power ===
Elder Mill was powered by a 600 hp (450 kW) vertical cross compound engine by Daniel Adamson, installed in 1937. It had a 3 ft (0.91 m) stroke. It ran at 106 rpm. The flywheel was 16 ft (4.9 m).

== Owners ==
- Lancashire Cotton Corporation (1930s-1964)
- Courtaulds (1964- )

== See also ==
- List of mills in Stockport
- Textile manufacturing
