= Pear New Mill =

Mill in Stockport, Greater Manchester, England

Pear New Mill Bredbury
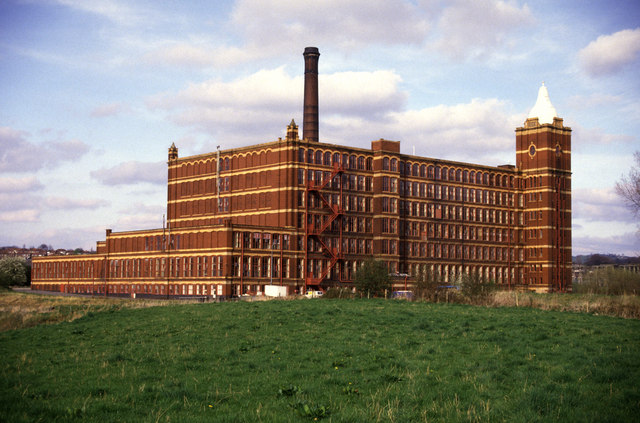

- Location within Greater Manchester

Combined Egyptian Mills
- Current status: Closed 1978, standing
- Location: Bredbury, Stockport, Greater Manchester, England
- Coordinates: SJ 9120 9079

Construction
- Built: 1912

Equipment
- Mule Frames: 137,312
- Ring Frames path: After 1950: 33,636 rings

Pear New Mill is a former Edwardian cotton spinning mill on the northern bank of the River Goyt in Bredbury, a town within the Metropolitan Borough of Stockport, Greater Manchester, England. It is a Grade II* listed building.

Pear Mill was one of the last cotton spinning mills to be built in England, commencing production in July 1913. The architects were A. H. Stott & Sons but because of difficulties in financing, it was completed by P. S. Stott. The building is typical of their work, with concrete floors and meticulous detailing. It was designed as a double mill, but the second mill was never built.

The power was provided by a Manhattan-type steam engine by George Saxon & Co. Transmission was by rope drives. The mill had 137,312 mule spindles which remained until the 1950s, when they were replaced by 33,636 ring spindles, the mill being electrified at the same time. It ceased operation as a textile mill in March 1978.

== Location ==
The mill was built next to the River Goyt, just outside the Borough of Stockport.

== History ==
The Pear Spinning Company, Lower Bredbury, was registered in 1907, with the intention of erecting a large double mill. It was one of the Stockport Limiteds mills, modelled on the Oldham Limiteds. It had a share capital of £100,000 in £5 shares. Work began in 1908, but the demand for cotton ended and it was difficult to raise capital. With £55,000 spent, the shell of the mill had been completed when the company was put into liquidation in January 1912. In April a new company was floated to finish the mill. This was the Pear New Mill Limited – it had a capital of £90,000 in £3 shares. Production started in July 1913 and the mill was fully equipped for spinning medium and fine counts by November. Immediately production was interrupted by the First World War. The two years between 1918 and 1920 were years of an exceptional boom, and the 1912 company was refloated with a capital of £250,000. This was the Pear New Mill (1919) Ltd company. The war had taken its toll on the Lancashire cotton industry and former markets such as India, China and Japan had built up their own spinning capacity. The price of cotton pieces fell to 38% of their 1913 value and though Pear New Mill did survive it lost its independence, and became part of Combined Egyptian Mills Ltd.

== Architecture ==
A large six-storey mill with steel frame and cast iron columns; the floors are of concrete. It was built by Stott and Sons but when Abraham Stott Junior was removed from the board of directors, the contract passed to his cousin and rival P. S. Stott. The mill has seven storeys if the cellar is counted, and attached are two-storey extensions for carding. The office is separate from the mill. Stott mills were known for their careful detailing, extensively using terracotta to detail red Accrington brick and large windows. The window heads are flat, except on the top storey, where round-headed arches were used. The window heads were picked out in yellow brick.

The pear 'signature theme' of the building includes a large pear-shaped concrete cupola on top of the water tower at the south-east corner, and pear-shaped finials at each corner of the flat roof. Ornate terracotta friezes over the main entrances continue the theme with bas-relief depictions of pear leaves and fruit.

=== Power ===
It was powered by a George Saxon 5000 hp twin Manhattan Compound, made in 1912. Running at 180 psi, it had two 30 in HP cylinders and two 60 in low-pressure cylinder. It had a 4-foot-6-inch stroke and operated a 23-foot-diameter flywheel at 80.5 rpm and 26 ropes; the flywheel had 73 rope grooves and was 15 feet wide, probably the widest in any cotton mill. It had drop valves on horizontal HP cylinders and Corliss valves on vertical LP cylinders. Tail rod support guides were on HP cylinders. Air pumps were driven from LP crossheads. It was removed by Mr Jim Price in 1962. The later ring frames were electrically driven.

=== Equipment ===
The mill had 52 pairs of spinning mules with a total of 137,312 spindles, and employed approximately 300 people. In 1929 the mill was acquired by Combined Egyptian Mills Ltd, a merger of 15 small companies that controlled over 30 mills. The building was modernised in the late 1950s, when electrically driven ring frames were installed, and in 1965 it was taken over by Carrington Viyella.

== Usage ==
Originally it was designed to spin best Egyptian cottons, in what was technically termed "combed" and "super carded yarns." However, in 1913 it started spinning mediums, 34s to 78s from American, Brazilian and Egyptian. By 1916 it had dropped Brazilian and did 40s to 90s, it then in 1917 purchased combing equipment and produced up to 120s then by 1929 it purchased Egyptian solely and ran 140s. They employed 300 people. The cotton count is a measure of the fineness of the yarn, the higher number being the finer. Egyptian cotton has the longest staple so is most suitable for fine counts.

=== Owners ===
- Pear Spinning Company – 1907
- Pear New Mill Ltd – 1912
- Pear New Mill (1919) Ltd – 1919
- Combined Egyptian Mills Ltd – April 1929
- Combined English Mills (Spinners) Ltd – 1953
- Carrington Vyella – 1964
- Multiple ownership

== See also ==
- Grade II* listed buildings in Greater Manchester
- Houldsworth Mill, Reddish
- List of mills in Stockport
- Listed buildings in Bredbury and Romiley
- Textile manufacturing
