= Kingston Mill, Stockport =

Cotton spinning mill in Greater Manchester, England

- Location in Greater Manchester

Spinning (ring mill in 1951)
- Location: Edgeley, Stockport, Greater Manchester, England
- Owner: Lucas Micholls, and Co
- Further ownership: Lancashire Cotton Corporation (1930s); Courtaulds (1964)
- Coordinates: 53.4087°N 2.1696°W

Construction
- Completed: 1891

Kingston Mill, Stockport is a mid nineteenth century cotton spinning mill in Edgeley, Stockport, Greater Manchester, England. It was taken over by the Lancashire Cotton Corporation in the 1930s and passed to Courtaulds in 1964. Production finished, it was made over to multiple uses.

== Location ==
Stockport is a large town in Greater Manchester, England. It lies on elevated ground on the River Mersey at the confluence of the rivers Goyt and Tame, 6.1 miles (9.8 km) southeast of the city of Manchester. Stockport is the largest settlement of the Metropolitan Borough of Stockport, and has a population of 136,082, the wider borough having 281,000.

Historically a part of Cheshire, Stockport in the 16th century was a small town entirely on the southbank of the Mersey, and known for the cultivation of hemp and rope manufacture and in the 18th century the town had one of the first mechanised silk factories in the United Kingdom. However, Stockport's predominant industries of the 19th century were the cotton and allied industries. Chestergate was the main east west road following the south bank of the Mersey, leading not surprisingly to Chester. Kingston Mill was about 500m east of Mersey Square.

== History ==
Stockport was influential in the early stages of the Industrial Revolution. From 1780 it was a centre of the water powered industry. From 1790 Stockport mills pioneered the use of steam. By 1800, Stockport exceeded Chester in size. The firm of Peter Marsland had become the largest cotton spinner in the region having 87,172 spindles- more than McConnel and Kennedy, Ancoats and Murrays' Mills in Ancoats. It was Stockport that pioneered the steam driven power loom. Then in 1830, the growth stalled, there were a series of strikes in 1802, 1829, and 1844. Significant mills, at this time were the Oldknow Mills, Hillgate, Orrells Mill in Heaton Norris and Houldsworth Mill, Reddish. Kingston mill was built at this time on Chestergate. In the final revival, after the cotton famine when private owners refinanced themselves by the means of joint-stock company flotations, Stockport built two of the industries largest mills Broadstone No.2 Mill with 138,000 mule spindles, and the Stockport Ring Mill No. 2 with 72,000 ring spindles.

In 1901 there was a fire at Kingston Mill. As a result, there was a universal adoption of sprinkler systems. These were fed by water from the water tower, and a supplementary tank on the roof.

The industry peaked in 1912 when it produced 8 billion yards of cloth. The great war of 1914–1918 halted the supply of raw cotton, and the British government encouraged its colonies to build mills to spin and weave cotton. The war over, Lancashire never regained its markets. The independent mills were struggling. The Bank of England set up the Lancashire Cotton Corporation in 1929 to attempt to rationalise and save the industry. Kingston Mill, Stockport was one of 104 mills bought by the LCC, and one of the 53 mills that survived through to 1950. In 2010, Kingston Mill still stands and it is in multiple industrial use.

== Usage ==
In 1891 Kingston Mill had 33,460 spindles, 38/458. In 1951 it was producing coarser ring spun yarns from 10's to 24's

=== Owners ===
- Lucas Micholls, and Co,(1891)
- Lancashire Cotton Corporation (1930s-1964)
- Courtaulds (1964-

=== Tenants ===
Cosmopolitan Photo Engravers occupied the second floor of Kingston from 1969 to 1975

== See also ==
- Textile manufacturing

== Bibliography ==
- Dunkerley, Philip (2009). "Dunkerley-Tuson Family Website, The Regent Cotton Mill, Failsworth". Archived from the original on 23 March 2008.
- LCC (1951). The mills and organisation of the Lancashire Cotton Corporation Limited. Blackfriars House, Manchester: Lancashire Cotton Corporation Limited.
- Roberts, A S (1921), "Arthur Robert's Engine List", Arthur Roberts Black Book., One guy from Barlick-Book Transcription, archived from the original on 23 July 2011
- Williams, Mike; Farnie, Douglas Anthony (1992). Cotton Mills of Greater Manchester. Carnegie Publishing. ISBN 0-948789-69-7.
