= Listed buildings in Bredbury and Romiley =

Bredbury and Romiley are towns in the Metropolitan Borough of Stockport, Greater Manchester, England. The towns, together with the area of Woodley and the village of Compstall and the surrounding countryside, contain 45 listed buildings that are recorded in the National Heritage List for England. Of these, two are listed at Grade II*, the middle grade, and the others are at Grade II, the lowest grade.

Most of the oldest listed buildings that date from before the Industrial Revolution are houses, farm houses and farm buildings, together with a chapel and a public house. The Peak Forest Canal which passes through the area helped to bring industry, in particular the textile industry. The listed building associated with the canal include bridges, an aqueduct, and the entrances to Woodley Tunnel. Two cotton mills, now used for other purposes, have survived and are listed, and the other listed buildings include churches, a bridge, a farmstead and three war memorials.

== Key ==
Grade	Criteria
II*	Particularly important buildings of more than special interest
II	Buildings of national importance and special interest

== Buildings ==
Name and location	Photograph	Date	Notes	Grade
Barn, Bredbury Hall; 53.41483°N 2.12303°W		16th century	The barn, which has been much altered, extended and used for other purposes, is built on four cruck trusses. The walls are in 19th and 20th-century brick and stone, and are partly rendered.	II
Barn, Goyt Hall; 53.40815°N 2.11769°W		16th century	The barn is in sandstone with a stone-slate roof. It has two doorways and two tiers of vents, Inside are two open cruck trusses.	II
Chadkirk Chapel; 53.40877°N 2.09162°W		16th century	The chapel has been altered and extended, and is now redundant. Originally timber framed on a stone plinth, much of it has been rebuilt in stone with quoins, and it has a stone-slate roof. The chapel consists of a nave and a chancel under a continuous roof. The doorways have rusticated surrounds. Some windows are circular with stone surrounds, impost blocks and keystones, others are mullioned, and there is a gabled dormer window. On the west gable is a timber bellcote with a pyramidal roof and a weathervane.	II*
Goyt Hall; 53.40797°N 2.11702°W		c. 1570	A timber framed house with stone at the rear, a later right wing in brick, and roofs of slate and stone-slate. It has two storeys and an H-shaped plan. The main range and left wing have a stone plinth and jettied upper floors and gables. On the front is a two-storey porch with a four-centred arched doorway. In the right wing are sash and casement windows.	II
Arden Hall; 53.43651°N 2.12356°W		1597	A country house in ruins, in stone with a stone-slate roof.originally with three storeys. On the front are two towers, one containing an entrance with mullioned windows and windows with cusped heads. There are stepped gables, and at the rear is a stair and observation tower with an octagonal top.	II
1 Barlow Fold; 53.41773°N 2.07903°W	—	17th century	A timber framed house on a plinth that was rebuilt in the 18th century and extended in the 20th century. The extensions are in stone and the roof is of stone-slate. The house has two storeys, three bays, and single-storey extension at the rear. It has a central door, and the windows are casements.	II
1, 3 and 5 Hall Lane; 53.42971°N 2.09452°W	—	17th century (or earlier)	Originally one house, partly rebuilt after a fire in the 19th century, and divided into three cottages. It is in stone, and has a roof partly of slate and partly of stone-slate. There are two storeys, and an H-shaped plan, consisting of a main range and cross-wings. The gables are coped, and most of the windows are mullioned. The left wing has a projecting plinth, quoins, and a ball finial.	II
Barn, Springwood Poultry Farm; 53.42215°N 2.06858°W	—	17th century	The barn is timber framed with brick nogging on a stone plinth, and has one wall replaced in stone and another in brick. The roof is in 20th-century asbestos sheet. The barn has three bays, and contains a central cart entry and two shippon doors, one blocked.	II
Castle Hill Farmhouse; 53.43569°N 2.11609°W	—	17th century	The farmhouse is timber framed on a stone plinth with a stone-slate roof. There are two storeys, three bays, a small rear wing, and a brick extension to the right. On the front is a lean-to porch, and the windows are 20th-century replacement casements.	II
Hydebank Farmhouse; 53.41003°N 2.07999°W	—	17th century	A stone farmhouse with sandstone quoins and a slate roof. It has two storeys, and originally had two bays and a rear wing. In the 19th century the rear wing was rebuilt as a separate house with three bays. The first bay projects and contains a bow window and a sash window in the gable, and in the second bay is a lean-to porch. Some mullioned windows remain, and others are replacements. Inside the house is an inglenook.	II
Lower Watermeetings Farmhouse; 53.41052°N 2.06581°W		17th century	The farmhouse was extended in the 19th century. It is on a stone plinth, the original part is timber framed, the extension is in brick, and it has a stone-slate roof. There are two storeys, the extension being taller, and each part has two bays. The windows in the original part are casements, and in the later part they are sashes, some of which are horizontally-sliding.	II
Harrytown Hall; 53.41272°N 2.10515°W		1671	A large house, altered and extended in the 18th and 19th centuries and later divided into flats. It has an H-shaped plan, the main range and left wing in stone with quoins, and the right wing in brick. The main range has two storeys, the wings have three, and the roofs are of slate and tiles, with coped gables and ball finials. On the front is a two-storey porch that has a doorway with a chamfered surround, flanked by mullioned and transomed windows. At the end of the right wing is a two-storey canted bay and the windows in this wing are sashes. Other features include an oriel window with a pyramidal roof, square and canted bay windows, and gabled dormers.	II
Whitebottom Farm; 53.42087°N 2.03860°W	—	1690	A sandstone farmhouse that has a slate roof with stone coping. There are two storeys, and an L-shaped plan, with a three-bay range and a rear wing. Most of the windows are mullioned, and some have inserted casements.	II
Barn, Arden Garage; 53.43554°N 2.12200°W	—	1716	The barn is in red sandstone on a projecting brick plinth with quoins, and a stone-slate roof. It has a rectangular plan with extensions to the left, right and rear. The barn contains opposing cart entrances, and hay lofts.	II
The Spread Eagle public house 53.41110°N 2.09935°W		1722	A brick public house on a projecting plinth, rendered on the front, with rusticated quoins and a stone-slate roof. Above the door is a later canopy, and the windows are 20th-century casements with keystone wedge lintels.	II
Werneth Old Hall Barn; 53.42613°N 2.06703°W	—	Early 18th century (probable)	A stone barn on a projecting plinth with quoins and a stone-slate roof. It contains opposed cart entries, and there is a shippon and hayloft in an outshut. At the rear are two tiers of vents and a shippon door, and in the right gable end are a door, windows and more vents.	II
Higher Waterside Farmhouse; 53.40129°N 2.10236°W	—	1733	The farmhouse is in stone with a 20th-century tile roof. It has two storeys, two bays, a two-storey extension to the left, and a lean-to at the right. The doorway has a square-cut surround and a fanlight, and the windows, which are mullioned and transomed, contain casements.	II
Chadkirk House; 53.40883°N 2.09188°W		1748	A stone house with rusticated quoins and a stone-slate roof. There are two storeys, four bays, and a rear wing. The doorway in the gable and one of the windows have rusticated keystone surrounds, above the door is a fanlight, and the windows are sashes.	II
6 Barlow Fold; 53.41810°N 2.07896°W	—	Mid-18th century	Originally two houses and later combined into one, it is in stone, rendered at the rear, and has a slate roof. The house has a single-depth plan, two storeys and two bays. There is one doorway, the other doorway having been blocked, and the windows are mullioned.	II
Hatherlow House; 53.41085°N 2.10033°W		Mid-18th century	A brick house with some tile-hanging, a modillion eaves cornice, and a stone-slate roof. It has two storeys, a double-depth plan, the original part has three bays, there is a lean-to at the rear, and a later semi-octagonal wing to the right. The middle bay projects slightly and has a doorway with pilasters, a fanlight, and a keystone. Most of the windows are sashes, and the others are casements in the original openings. The wing has sash windows and a pyramidal roof.	II
105 Hyde Road; 53.42606°N 2.09995°W	—	1755	A brick house, later used for other purposes, it is on a projecting plinth, and has corner pilasters, a bracketed eaves gutter, and a stone-slate roof. There are two storeys and a symmetrical front of three bays. The central doorway has moulded imposts, a keystone, and a fanlight. The windows are 20th-century casements with stone sills and timber lintels.	II
Barker Cottage; 53.42349°N 2.08982°W		Late 18th century	A house, later a garage, in stone with a stone-slate roof. There is a single-depth plan, two storeys, and three bays. The windows are casements with square-cut lintels, jambs and sills. It was the birthplace of the political scientist Ernest Barker.	II
The Cottage; 53.41787°N 2.07879°W	—	Late 18th century	A house in rendered brick with a roof partly of slate and partly of stone-slate. It has two storeys and three bays; the right bay has a double-depth plan and the others are single-depth. The doorway is in the middle bay, and the windows are mullioned and contain casements.	II
Aqueduct over Green Lane; 53.41090°N 2.09754°W		1794–1801	The aqueduct carries the Peak Forest Canal over a road. It is in stone and consists of a single semi-elliptical arch, later rendered. There is a band, the retaining and parapet walls have a segmental plan, and the parapets have rounded coping.	II
Bridge No. 9, Peak Forest Canal; 53.43632°N 2.09189°W		1794–1801	An accommodation bridge over the canal, it is in stone and consists of a single semi-elliptical arch. The bridge has a projecting bands, concave retaining walls, parapets with rounded copings, and terminal piers.	II
Bridge No. 12, Peak Forest Canal; 53.42845°N 2.09734°W		1794–1801	The bridge carries Bankfield Road over the canal. It is in stone and consists of a single horseshoe arch with bands, parapets with rounded copings and a concave plan, and terminal piers.	II
Bridge No. 13, Peak Forest Canal; 53.42167°N 2.09776°W		1794–1801	The bridge carries a road, Gilbertbank, over the canal. It is in stone and consists of a single semi-elliptical arch with bands, segmental retaining walls, parapets with rounded copings, keystones, and terminal piers.	II
Bridge No. 15, Peak Forest Canal; 53.40790°N 2.07240°W		1794–1801	An accommodation bridge over the canal, it is in millstone grit, and consists of a round-headed arch with voussoirs, a band, and coping. Adjacent to the bridge are walls to a cutting, previously a tunnel.	II
Hydebank Tunnel, west entrance 53.41047°N 2.08200°W		1794–1801	The tunnel carries the Peak Forest Canal. It is in stone and consists of a semicircular arch with bands. The parapet has a rounded head, and terminates at one end in a square pier, and at the other end in a set of stone steps.	II
Woodley Tunnel, north portal 53.42648°N 2.09800°W		1794–1801	The portal is at the northern end of the tunnel carrying the Peak Forest Canal. It is in millstone grit, and consists of an almost round-headed arch with a slight skew and has bands, coping and voussoirs.	II
Woodley Tunnel, south portal 53.42524°N 2.09896°W		1794–1801	The portal is at the southern end of the tunnel carrying the Peak Forest Canal. It is in millstone grit, and consists of an almost round-headed arch with a slight skew and has bands, coping and voussoirs.	II
Bredbury House; 53.41668°N 2.10536°W		Early 19th century	A stone house and cottage with stone-slate roofs. The house has a double-depth plan, two storeys with attics, and three bays. In the centre is a doorway with Roman Ionic columns, an enriched frieze, and a pediment. The windows are 20th-century casements with wedge lintels. To the right is a lower rendered single-bay cottage with a porch and sash windows.	II
Woodley Mill; 53.42863°N 2.09499°W		1828	A former cotton spinning mill, it is in red brick with Welsh slate roofs, and has an internal structure of iron frames and brick arches. There are three storeys and a basement, a main range of 20 bays and a cross-wing at the south with five gabled bays facing the road and eight bays on the south return. In the angle are offices and a stair turret.	II
Church Houses and Post Office, Compstall; 53.41517°N 2.05444°W		1835–36	Originally one house, later divided into three houses and a post office. The building is in stone on a plinth, with a stone-slate roof, two storeys and a basement, and sides of six and two bays. The doorways have chamfered surrounds and fanlights. The windows on the front are mullioned, and at the rear they are sashes.	II
St Paul's Church, Compstall; 53.41576°N 2.05521°W		1839–40	The chancel was added in 1866, and a vestry in 1905. The church is in stone with a slate roof, and consists of a nave on a projecting plinth with an eaves cornice, a polygonal chancel, and a west tower. The tower has three stages, diagonal buttresses, clock faces, and a coped parapet. The windows are lancets, and inside the church is a west gallery.	II
Road bridge, Oakwood Hall Lodge; 53.41056°N 2.08156°W		c. 1845	The bridge, designed by Edward Walters, is in stone, and consists of a single Tudor arch flanked by square piers that rise to become semi-hexagonal. The parapets curve outward and terminate in square piers at one end and in octagonal gate piers at the other. The walls have a moulded band, moulded coping, and corbelled semi-hexagonal projections.	II
Hatherlow United Reformed Church; 53.41058°N 2.09894°W		1846	The church is in stone with a stone-slate roof, and consists of a nave, a south porch, a north transept, a polygonal vestry at the east end, and a west tower. The tower has a west door, a polygonal bell turret with flying buttresses, and a pyramidal spire. The windows are lancets.	II
St Mark's Church, Bredbury; 53.42415°N 2.10494°W		1847–48	The church, by E. H. Shellard, is in stone with slate roofs. It consists of a nave, north and south aisles, a chancel with a vestry, and a west tower flanked by porches. The tower has five stages, buttresses that rise to octagonal columns with ornate pinnacles, a clock face, and a parapet. The body of the church has a projecting plinth, bands, a coped parapet, coped gables, and corner pinnacles. Inside the church are galleries on three sides.	II
St Chad's Church, Romiley; 53.41279°N 2.08943°W		1864–1866	The church, designed by J. Medland Taylor, is in stone with a clay tile roof. It consists of a nave, north and south aisles, north and south transepts, a chancel with a polygonal apse, and a west steeple. The steeple has a three-stage tower with angle buttresses, a stair turret, gabled clock surrounds, and a broach spire with hipped lucarnes.	II
Elm Tree Farm; 53.41738°N 2.13059°W		1883	The farmstead is in red brick, with dressings in buff sandstone and blue engineering brick, and blue slate roofs. It consists of a single building containing a farmhouse to the south, a barn, shippons, stables and looseboxes to the north, and detached pigsties and an outhouse. The main building has two storeys and an attic, and four bays under a gable with a finial at the front. This front contains a plinth, quoins, segmental-headed sash windows, and a gabled timber porch with a pendant and a finial, and pierced bargeboards. included in the listing are the boundary walls and gate piers, and historic stone surfaces.	II
Pear New Mill; 53.41376°N 2.13386°W		1908–1912	A cotton mill, later used for other purposes, it was designed by Stott and Sons, and completed by Philip Sidney Stott. The mill has a steel frame, cast iron columns, and is faced in Accrington brick with terracotta dressings. The main building has a rectangular plan with six storeys, and there are a two-storey carding room, a three-storey reception area and warehousing, an engine house, and a tall chimney with pilasters and a moulded crown. The water and stair tower has a roof in the shape of a pear, and the corner turrets have pear finials.	II*
Bredbury and Romiley war memorial 53.41602°N 2.10203°W		c. 1920	The war memorial stands at a road junction in a traffic island surrounded by roads. It is in stone and consists of a cross fleurée on a tapering octagonal shaft with a moulded foot. This is on an octagonal two-tiered plinth on a base of two steps. On the plinth are inscriptions and the names of those lost in both World Wars. The area is surrounded by pairs of decorative metal posts.	II
Romiley war memorial 53.41332°N 2.09615°W		c. 1920	The war memorial stands in a grassed area in a traffic island surrounded by roads. It is in red sandstone, and consists of a Latin cross on a tapering four-sided plinth with a moulded cap standing on a square base. In the centre of the cross head is a circular panel containing the monogram IHS. There are two granite plaques: the one on the plinth records the names of those lost in the First World War, and the plaque on the base carries an inscription.	II
Compstall war memorial 53.41526°N 2.05518°W		1922	The war memorial is in buff sandstone, and consists of a cross with a height of about 2.1 metres (6 ft 11 in). It has a tapering square plinth on four octagonal steps, and an octagonal shaft and arms, with a wheelhead cross carved on the front. On the plinth is an inscription and the names of those lost in the First World War.	II
