= Stott and Sons =

English architectural practice

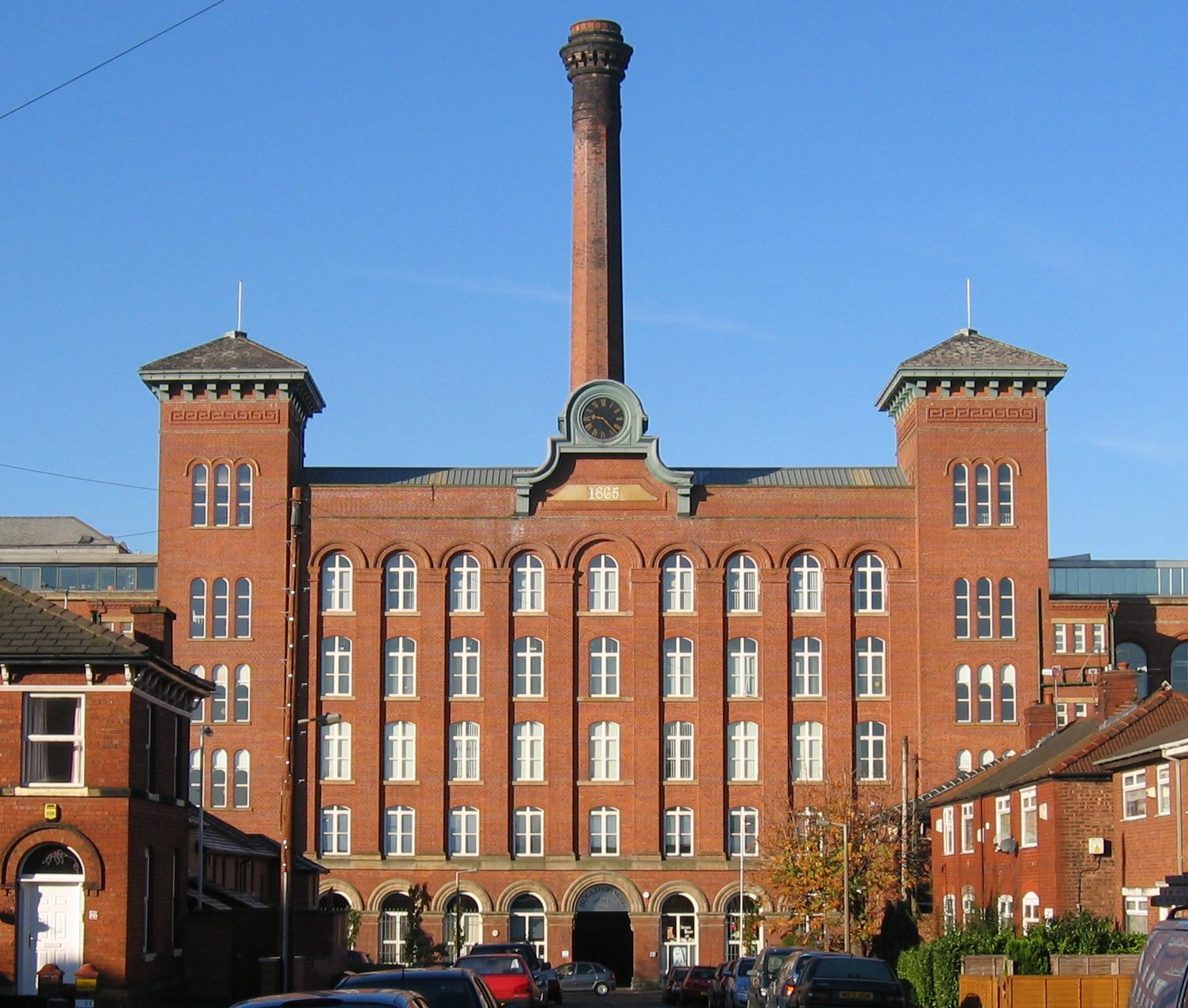
- Houldsworth Mill, Reddish, A. H. Stott, 1865
- Type: Family firm
- Industry: Architectural Practice
- Founded: A. H. Stott (1847); A. H. Stott & Son (1847); A. H. Stott & Sons (1847); Stott and Sons
- Founder: Abraham Henthorn Stott, Senior 1822–1904
- Defunct: 1931
- Fate: dissolved
- Headquarters: Oldham, Lancashire (1847–); Manchester, Lancashire, UK
- Area served: Lancashire
- Key people: Abraham Henthorn Stott Senior (1822–1904); Jesse Ainsworth Stott (1853–1917); Abraham Henthorn Stott Junior (1856–1931)
- Products: Cotton mills

Stott and Sons was an architectural practice in Lancashire between 1847 and 1931. It specialised in cotton mills, designing 191 buildings of which 130 were mills or buildings related to the cotton industry. Abraham Henthorn Stott was born on 25 April 1822 at Crompton in the parish of Prestwich-cum-Oldham. He served a seven-year apprenticeship with Sir Charles Barry, the architect of the Houses of Parliament and Manchester Art Gallery. Abraham returned to Oldham in 1847 and founded the architectural practice of A. H. Stott. It was known for his innovative structural engineering. His brother Joseph Stott in 1866 started his career here before leaving to start his own practice. Three of his nine children worked in the practice. Jesse Ainsworth Stott became the senior partner. Philip Sidney Stott spent three years in the practice before starting his own. After Abraham's retirement his practice was renamed Stott and Sons.

== History ==
=== Foundation ===
The firm of A. H. Stott probably started in Clegg Street, Oldham in 1847. The owner, Abraham Henthorn Stott, had finished his architectural apprenticeship with Charles Barry's practice. It is thought that he obtained this position through the influence Jesse Ainsworth. On 30 December 1851, he married Ainsworth's niece Elizabeth or Eliza Ainsworth. The Ainsworths were prominent land and property owners in Oldham; the first identified mill that A. H. Stott designed was a room and power mill, Summervale Mill on Fletcher Street Jesse or Hannah Ainsworth (née Lees). The Lees were another prominent Oldham family.

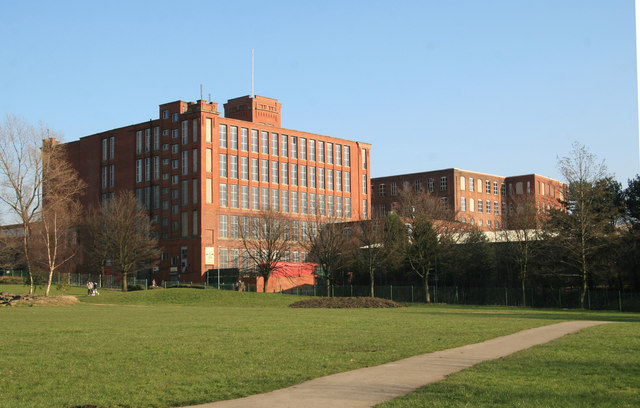
Osborne Mills, Chadderton. The older mill behind was by A. H. Stott, the new mill by P. S. Stott

Family connections were important in mid-Victorian Oldham. James and Mary Stott (née Henthorn) were married at the parish church of Prestwich-cum-Oldham on 18 June 1821. James was a stonemason, and was illiterate. They had four children in the township of Crompton, and two further children after a move to Oldham. Abraham was the first child and the first boy. Both Abraham and Joseph started work as stonemasons. A further cousin of A. H. Stott was a master cotton spinner called Abraham Stott and he owned Osborne Mills, which were built in 1872. The cousin traded under the name of Abraham Stott Ltd. A. H. Stott was a freemason. The offices moved to 37a King Street, Oldham in 1854.

=== Building a reputation, 1860–1880 ===
Established in Oldham Society and well connected, A. H. Stott was attracting contracts from major cotton spinners. He built mills for Callender of Manchester, then for William Houldsworth who was moving from Manchester city centre to rural Reddish, this involved ten years of work building the mills, houses and community buildings. Houldsworth Mill(1863) is a Grade II+ listed building and is a good example of an 1860s cotton mill. Work was also done for Hilton Greaves of Derker Mills, Oldham.

However, in 1860, the Oldham Limiteds concept was born. Initially, workers in the industry gathered together to build their own mill, but when the concept had been proven all started to speculate. This provided A.H.Stott many new mills to build, but also he indulged in speculation. The Abbey Mill Spinning Company was registered in 1875, of the first 490 £5 shares taken up, 200 went to Abraham H. Stott and 200 to George Preston, a civil engineer. As a rule of thumb, a 58,000 spindle mill would cost about £64,000 to build or about £1.10 a spindle, and the architect would claim a 2½% fee. Abraham was not as active building mills as his brother Joseph in the 1870s. Example mills may be Butler Green Cotton Spinning Ltd, Chadderton (1862), Reddish Spinning Company Mills (1874), a finishing works for J. Chadwick & Co Ltd (1875), and John Broadbent & Sons, Oakfield Mill, Droylsden.

It was in 1871 he filed a patent for "Improvements in the construction of Fireproof and other Flooring". He had previously in 1864 attempted to file a patent on improvements to the design of steam boilers with limited success. By 1873, A. H. Stott was describing himself as an "Engineering Architect". The firm opened its first Manchester Office in 1875. His sons Jesse Ainsworth Stott and Abraham Henthorn Stott, jnr. joined the business in 1875 and 1877, and the company name was altered to accommodate the changes.

=== Mature firm ===
In 1883, the firm moved their Manchester offices to 60 Haworth Buildings, Cross Street a prestigious address and it was here that it remained until 1931. This building was designed in 1876–8 by Alfred Waterhouse. A. Henthorn Stott, Jnr moved his home to Bowdon, Cheshire in 1894 and the Oldham office closed in 1896. Jesse Ainsworth Stott moved to Broomfield Rd, in Heaton Moor 1890 and built himself Greystead, on Buxton Road, Stockport in 1895. The peaks and troughs of their mill building activity matched that of the industry. The majority of mills were now for Limited Liability Companies and the partners often took shares in the mills they built.

Work was forthcoming outside the Lancashire cotton belt. In 1884 they designed a mill of 30,000 spindles in Oldenzaal in the Netherlands, and designs were made for mills for the Lings Spinning Company in Pennsylvania.

=== Arson 1887 ===
As would be fitting for an upwardly mobile Manchester family, A. H. Stott bought the Pensychnant Estate, near Conway in Gwynedd. The new house was completed in 1882. On 5 April 1887, fire broke out in the old part of the house, and A .H. Stott was charged with arson. He stood trial on 12–13 July 1887 before Mr Justice Denman at the Caernarfon assizes. He was acquitted on grounds of insufficient evidence. His brothers had been concerned about his mental health saying he talked of suicide because he could not persuade his wife and other family members to move to the Pensychnant Estate.

=== Edwardian mills ===
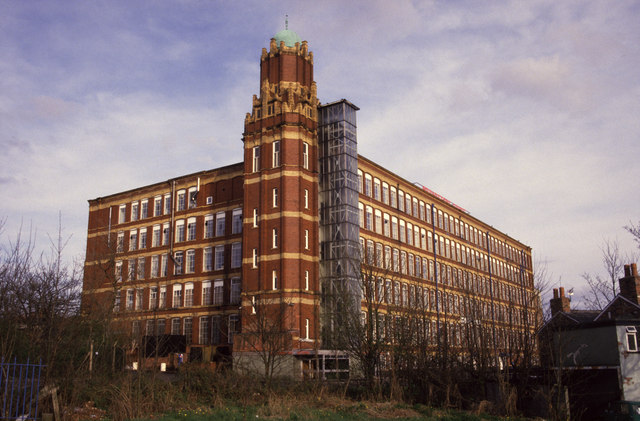
Broadstone Mill shows all the design features of a typical Edwardian Stott and Son mill.

Stott and Son led by A. Henthorn Stott, Jun., were big players in mill building in the 20th century. Of the 16.8 million spindles that were added between 1900 and 1914, 2.61 million were in the 24 mills designed by Stott and Son. These mills were distinctive, embracing the flamboyant architecture of that time. Considerable attention was given to the water tower that would usually advertise the name of the mill, or when the water tower was too elaborate, on the parapet of the main mill block. They used pitched roofs shielded by parapets. Stott and Son favoured Byzantine-style water towers, the use of horizontal bands of yellow brick above the window, and terracotta ornamentation. Examples are the Goyt Mill, Marple (1905), Broadstone Mill, Reddish (1904) and Coppull Ring Mill (1905) that had identical water tower, Fernhurst Mill, Chadderton (1905), Butts Mill, Leigh (1907), Pear Mill, Stockport (1907), Ram Mill, Chadderton (1907).

=== Decline ===
The Edwardian boom ended in 1908, and many mills that had been started were left uncompleted for 5 years. When the economy turned investment started again, which in many cases was unwise. The final mill was the Swan Lane Number3 Mill in 1914. Jesse Ainsworth Stott died in 1917, and the business was continued by his brother A. Henthorn Stott. Jesse'ś two sons were both involved in the running of J. Chadwick and Co Ltd, a private limited liability company, who were calico printers, bleachers, finishers and dyers. Jesse was married to Chadwick's daughter, and A. Henthorn Stott was the managing director. For the next fourteen years little work was done in the cotton sector, A. Henthorn Stott who had built a house, Plas Dolydd on the Pensychnant Estate showed and interest in conservation issues such as quarrying at Penmaenmawr and the preservation of Thomas Telford's Menai Suspension Bridge. He died in 1931, the architectural practice was dissolved and his wealth of £132,439 divided.

== Family tree ==
{{Stott family of Oldham}}
