= Woodley, Greater Manchester =

Suburb of Stockport, Greater Manchester, England

Coordinates: 53.427°N 2.092°W

Woodley
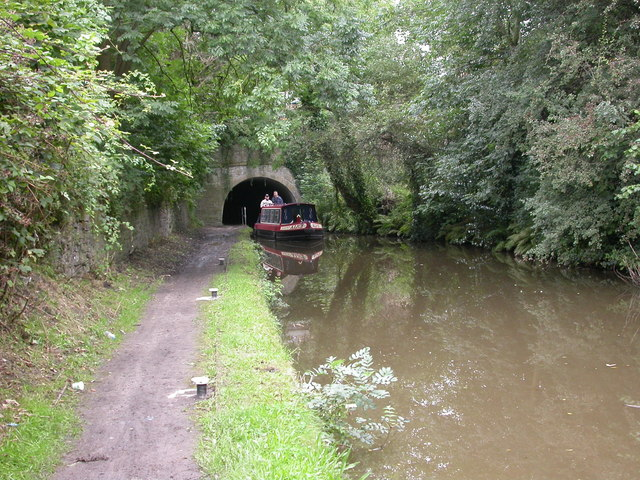
- Woodley Tunnel

- Location within Greater Manchester
- OS grid reference: SJ938922
- Metropolitan borough: Stockport
- Metropolitan county: Greater Manchester
- Region: North West
- Country: England
- Sovereign state: United Kingdom
- Post town: STOCKPORT
- Postcode district: SK6
- Dialling code: 0161
- Police: Greater Manchester
- Fire: Greater Manchester
- Ambulance: North West
- UK Parliament: Hazel Grove

Woodley is a suburb in the Metropolitan Borough of Stockport, Greater Manchester, England. It is situated mostly on the east side of the Peak Forest Canal, next to Bredbury, Romiley and the boundary with Tameside, at Gee Cross. Historically part of Cheshire, the name means "a clearing in the wood" because the area contains much woodland.

== Religion ==
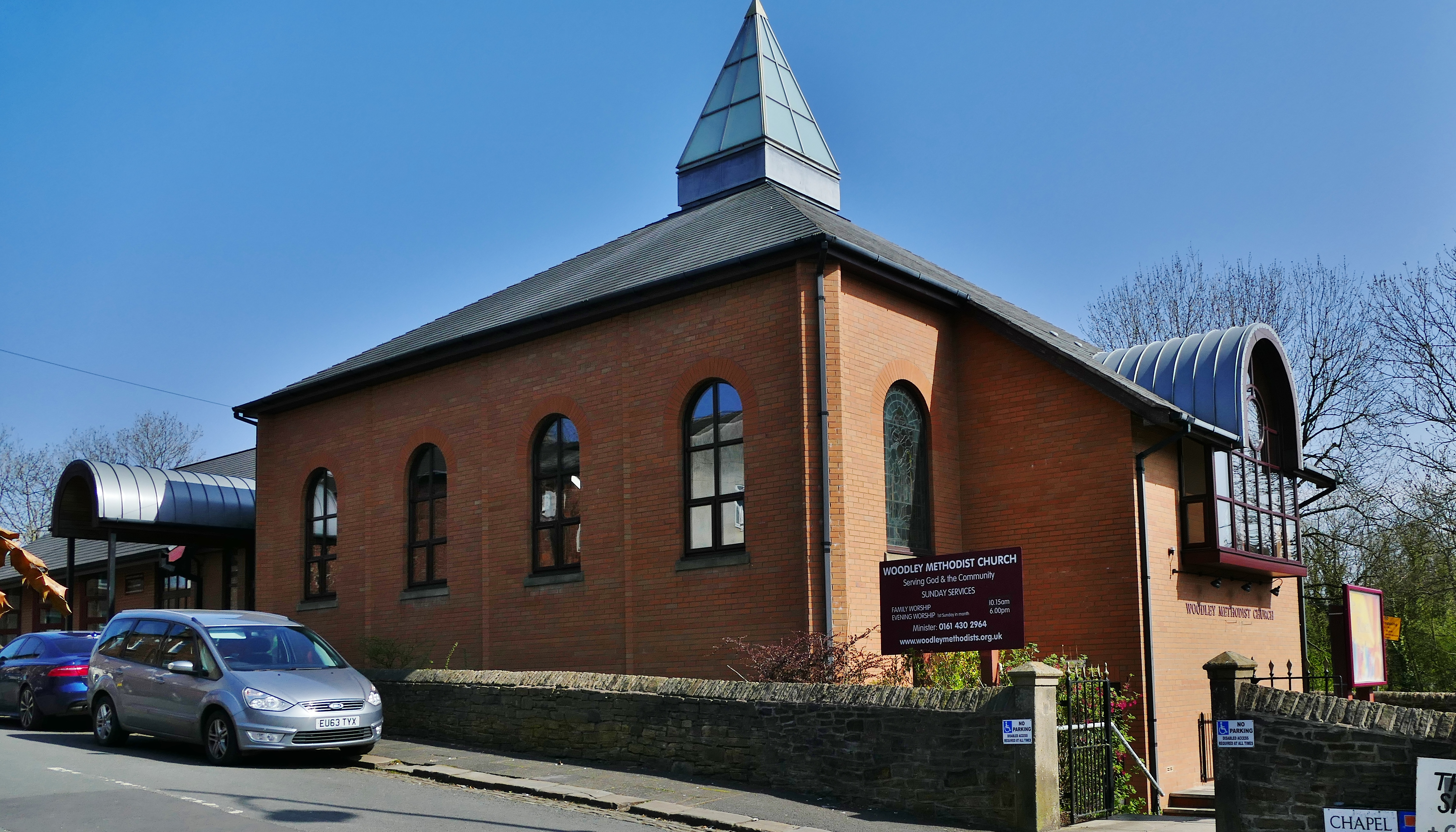
Woodley Methodist Church - exterior

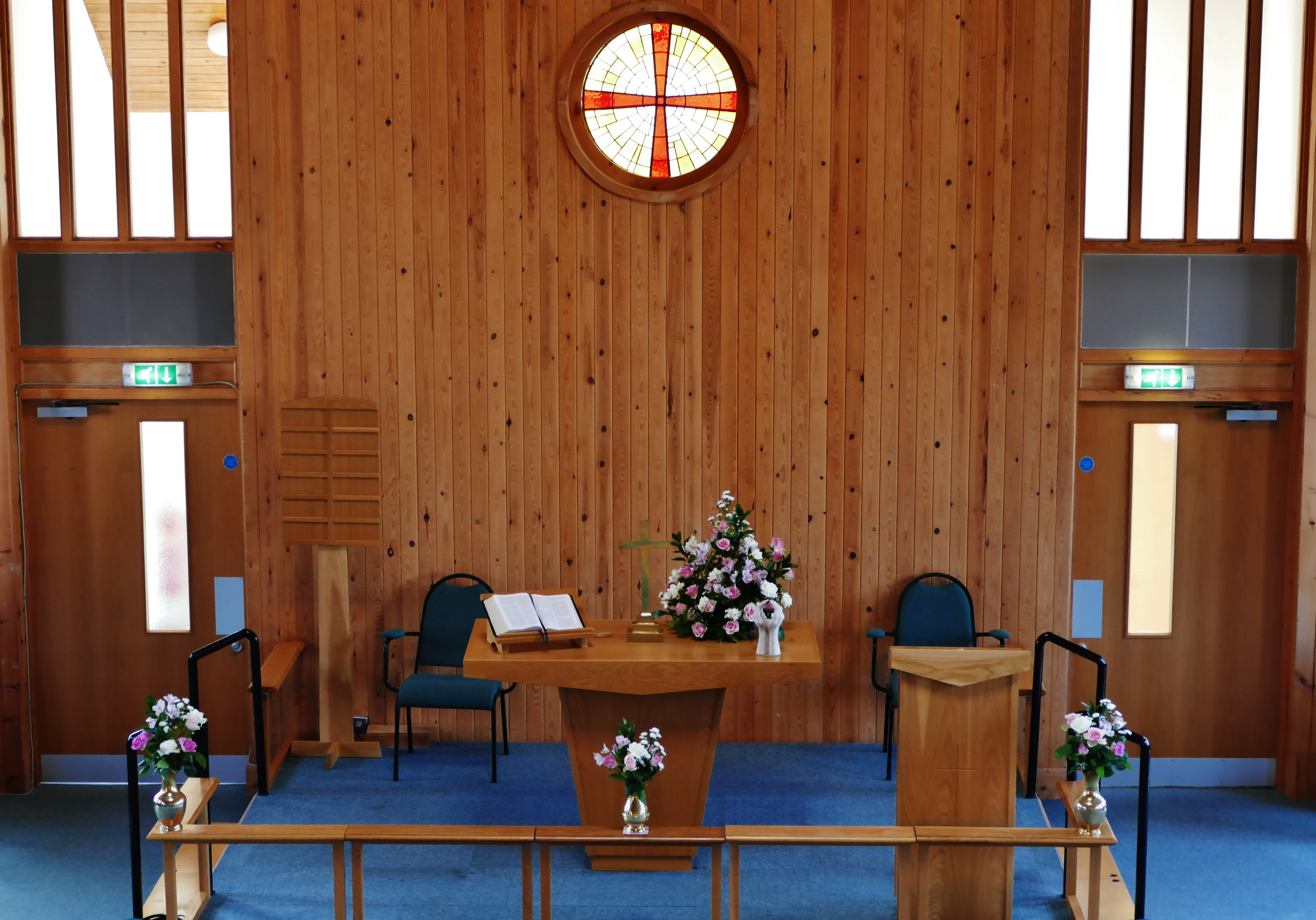
Woodley Methodist Church interior

Woodley Methodist Church, sited on Chapel Street, has been a part of the community since 1868; the building was rebuilt in 1998.

St Mark's Church, sited on Redhouse Lane in Bredbury, is an Anglican church which serves the parish of Bredbury and Woodley.

== Transport ==
=== Railway ===
Woodley railway station is a stop on the Hope Valley Line; it is on the Hyde Loop which stretches from Ashburys to Romiley, via Guide Bridge but by-passing Bredbury.

Northern Trains operates services in a generally half-hourly pattern between Manchester Piccadilly and Rose Hill Marple on Mondays to Saturdays; there is no service on Sundays.

=== Buses ===
Stagecoach Manchester operates two local bus routes:

- 330 runs regularly between Stockport and Ashton-under-Lyne, via Bredbury, Hyde and Dukinfield
- 382 runs between Stockport and Woodley, via Bredbury and Romiley.

=== Roads ===
Woodley is situated close to J25 of the M60 Manchester orbital motorway. The A560 passes through the suburb, which runs between Altrincham, Stockport, Gee Cross and Hattersley.

=== Canal ===
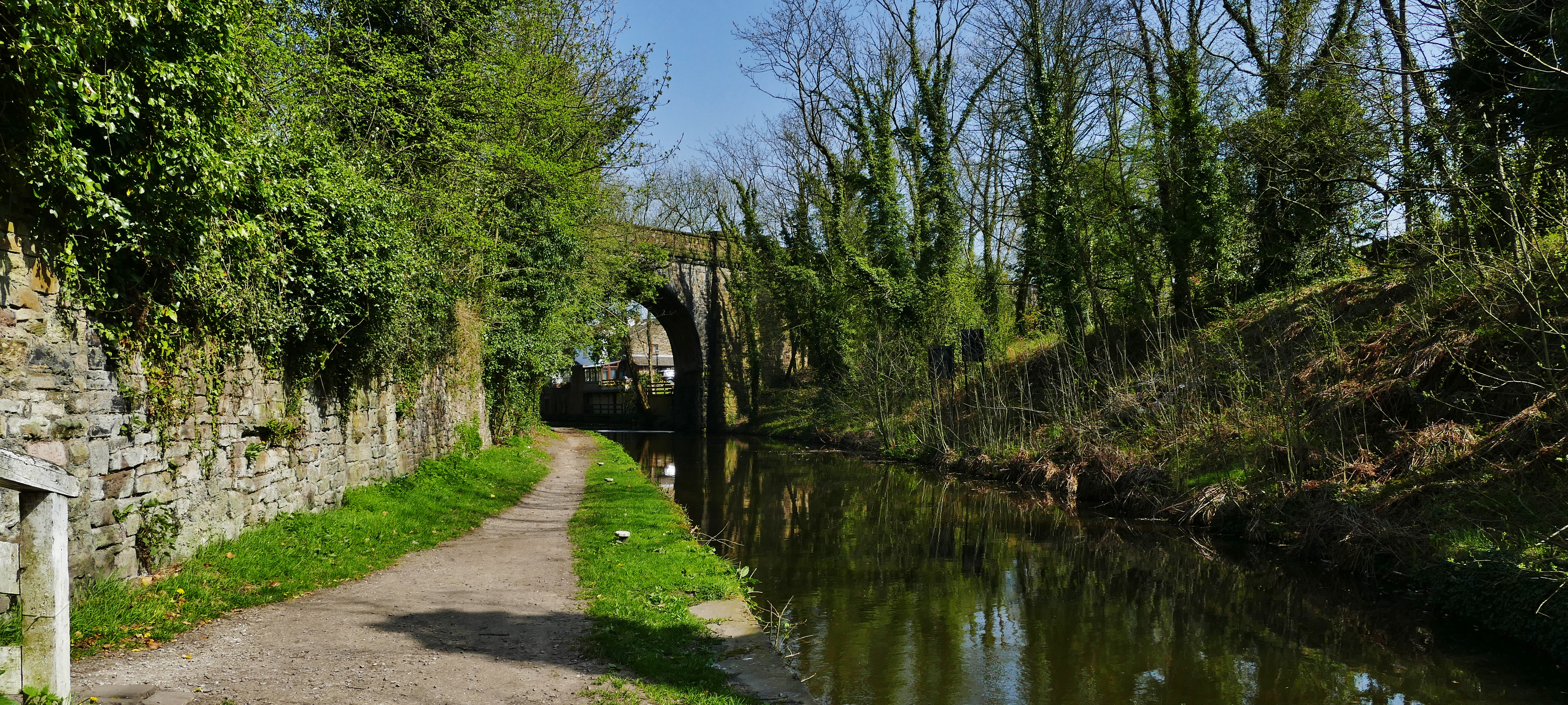
Canal at Hyde Road

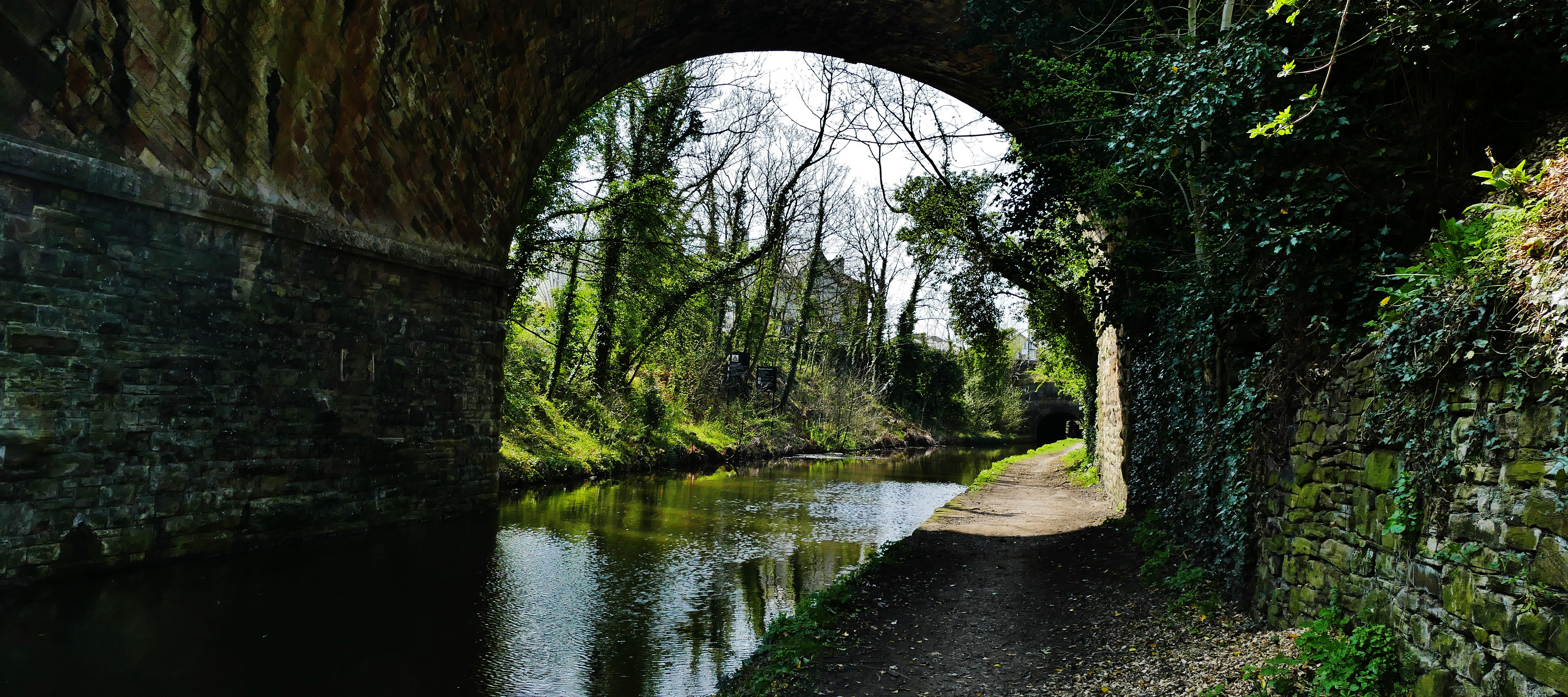
Canal Bridge near Hyde Road

The Peak Forest Canal runs through Woodley, which features a long tunnel under the A560. It was completed in 1805. Although much of the canal fell into disuse by the early 1960s, it was restored and reopened subsequently in April 1974.

== Education ==
Woodley has two primary schools:

- Woodley Primary School, previously called Woodley Infant and Junior schools. The school also ran a nursery which was next to (and connected to) Woodley Methodist Church. This was the site of the original Woodley primary school opened in 1864.
- Greave Primary School, in Greave, on the border with Romiley.

Primary school aged children can also attend a nearby school in neighbouring Bredbury: St. Mark's Church of England Primary School on Redhouse Lane; this was the original infant and junior school for the locality.

Most students then feed to either Werneth School, Marple Hall School or Harrytown Catholic High School for their secondary education.

== Community ==
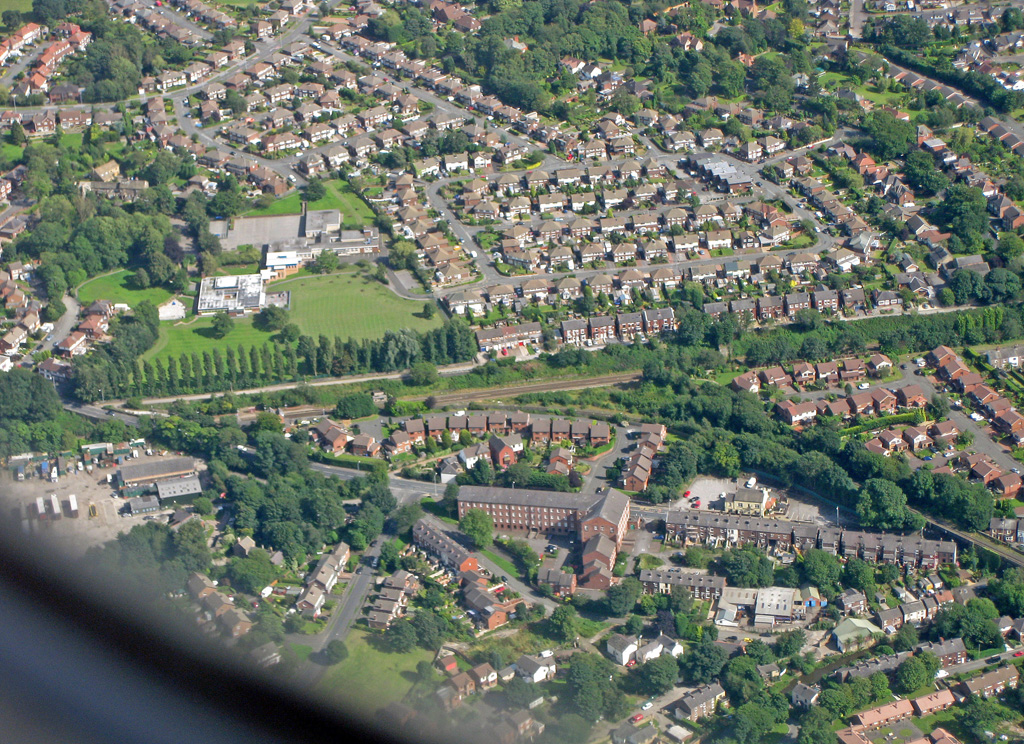
Woodley looking south-east, with the old J. G. Naylor abrasives mill factory at the lower centre and Woodley station to the left

Woodley is home to four pubs: The White Hart, The Railway, The Navigation and The Woodley Arms. They form the start of the Ring of Death, a pub crawl that takes in Woodley, Bredbury, Romiley and ends in Greave; it used to consist of twenty pubs in total and was a traditional marathon undertaken by locals at Christmas.

Woodley was also home to a snooker hall originally a cinema. Following the removal of its snooker tables, became the Palace Bar; it has now closed.

== Sport ==
Woodley is the home of semi-professional football club Stockport Town. They are currently members of the North West Counties League Premier Division, the ninth tier of English football, and play at Stockport Sports Village.

Stockport Sports Village is located in Woodley; facilities include a gym, sauna, football pitches and fitness courses.

Woodley Cricket Club play their home matches at their facilities on High Lane.

== Mills ==
Extant

- Woodley Mill
- Thorn Works (formerly Middle Mill)
- Wellington Works (formerly Botany Mill)

Demolished

- Wood Mill, Woodley
- Top Mill
- Star Mill

== See also ==
- Listed buildings in Bredbury and Romiley
