= Spread Eagle, Romiley =

Listed pub in Greater Manchester, England

Spread Eagle
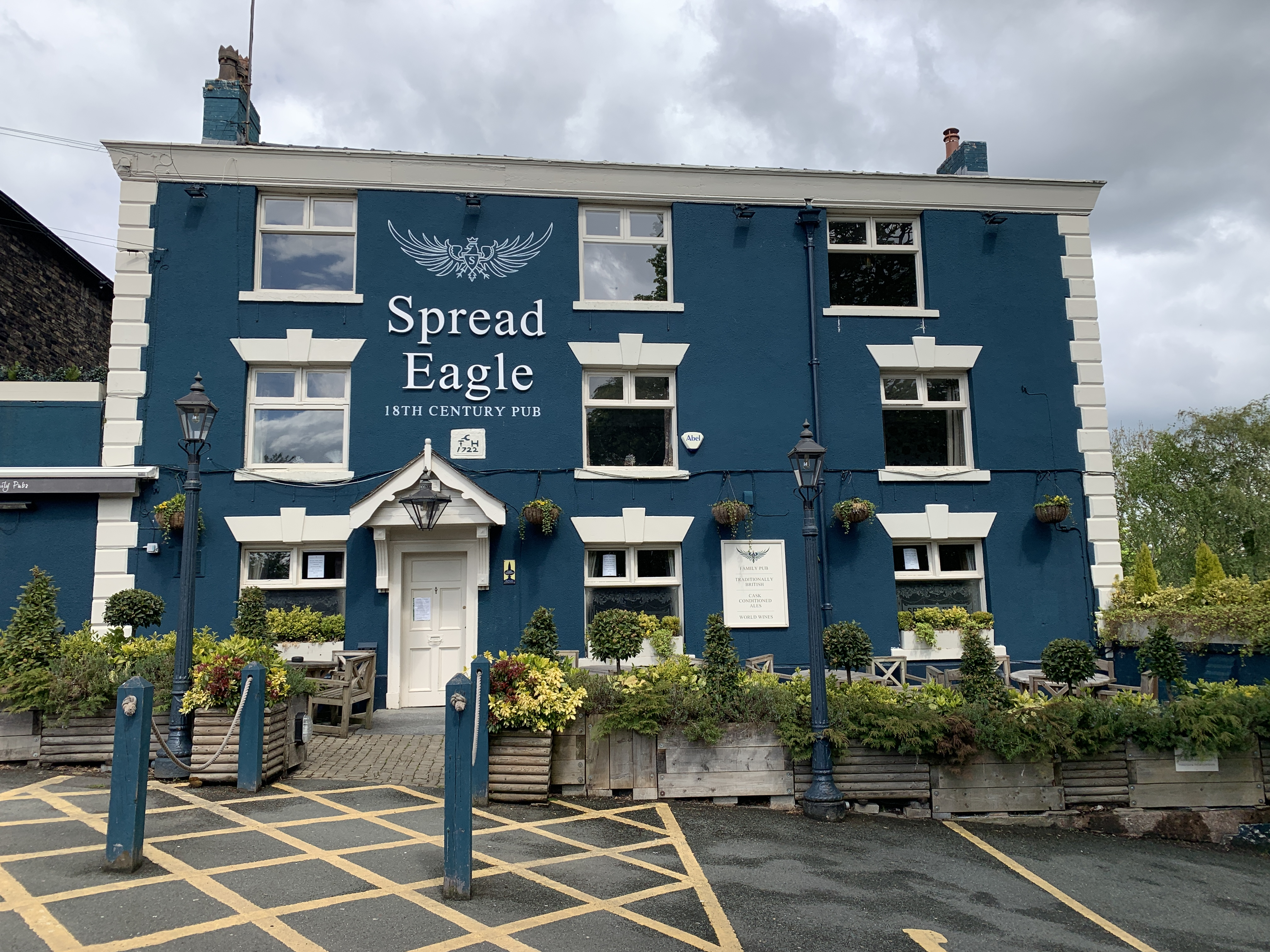
- The pub in 2020

- Location within Greater Manchester

General information
- Type: Public house
- Location: Hatherlow, Romiley, Greater Manchester, England
- Coordinates: 53.4111°N 2.0993°W
- Year built: 1722; 304 years ago
- Renovated: 2025 (refurbished)
- Owner: Greene King

Design and construction
- Designations

Listed Building – Grade II
- Official name: The Spread Eagle public house
- Designated: 11 October 1985
- Reference no.: 1242585

Website
- Official website

The Spread Eagle is a Grade II listed public house on Hatherlow in Romiley, a village within the Metropolitan Borough of Stockport, Greater Manchester, England. It dates from 1722, a year marked on a datestone. After refurbishment in 2025, it has, as of June 2026, been operated by Almond Family Pubs, with the freehold owned by Greene King. It lies close to the towpath of the Peak Forest Canal.

== History ==
The building was constructed in 1722, a date that appears on a datestone, according to its official listing. The 1898 and 1936 Ordnance Survey maps show the building as a public house without a name.

On 11 October 1985, the Spread Eagle was designated a Grade II listed building. The pub underwent refurbishment works in 2025, and as of June 2026 it is operated by Almond Family Pubs, while the freehold is owned by Greene King. It is close to the towpath of the Peak Forest Canal.

== Architecture ==
The building is constructed in brick with a rendered front and a slate roof. It has a three‑storey front range with three bays, and a two‑storey section at the back that gives it a deeper plan. The front includes a raised base, corner detailing, a boxed eaves line and chimney stacks on the gables. The main entrance, later fitted with a canopy, sits between the first and second bays. Each floor has three windows with modern casements set in openings with stone sills and wedge‑shaped lintels.

== See also ==
- Listed buildings in Bredbury and Romiley
- Listed pubs in Greater Manchester
