= Combined Egyptian Mills =

British textile company

Combined Egyptian Mills Ltd was a British textile joint-stock company established in 1929 with headquarters at Howe Bridge Mills in Atherton, then in Lancashire, to buy and return to profitability, 34 financially failing cotton mills owned by 16 companies. It was at that time the world's second largest cotton spinning company with 3.2 million spindles. In 1953 the company name changed to Combined English Mills. Viyella took over company in the 1960s.

The mills were principally in the south Lancashire and Stockport areas, where Pear Mill, Bredbury was a notable building. The company took over Alder Mill, Bedford Mill, Firs Mills, Hall Lane Mill, Mather Lane Mill and Brooklands Mill (Mather Lane No 3 Mill) in Leigh. Howe Bridge Mills and Laburnum Mills in Atherton, Holden Mill at Astley Bridge in Bolton, Kearsley Mill in Kearsley and Walkden Mill in Walkden were also owned by the company.
