= Wear Mill, Stockport =

Cotton mill in Greater Manchester, England

Wear Mill
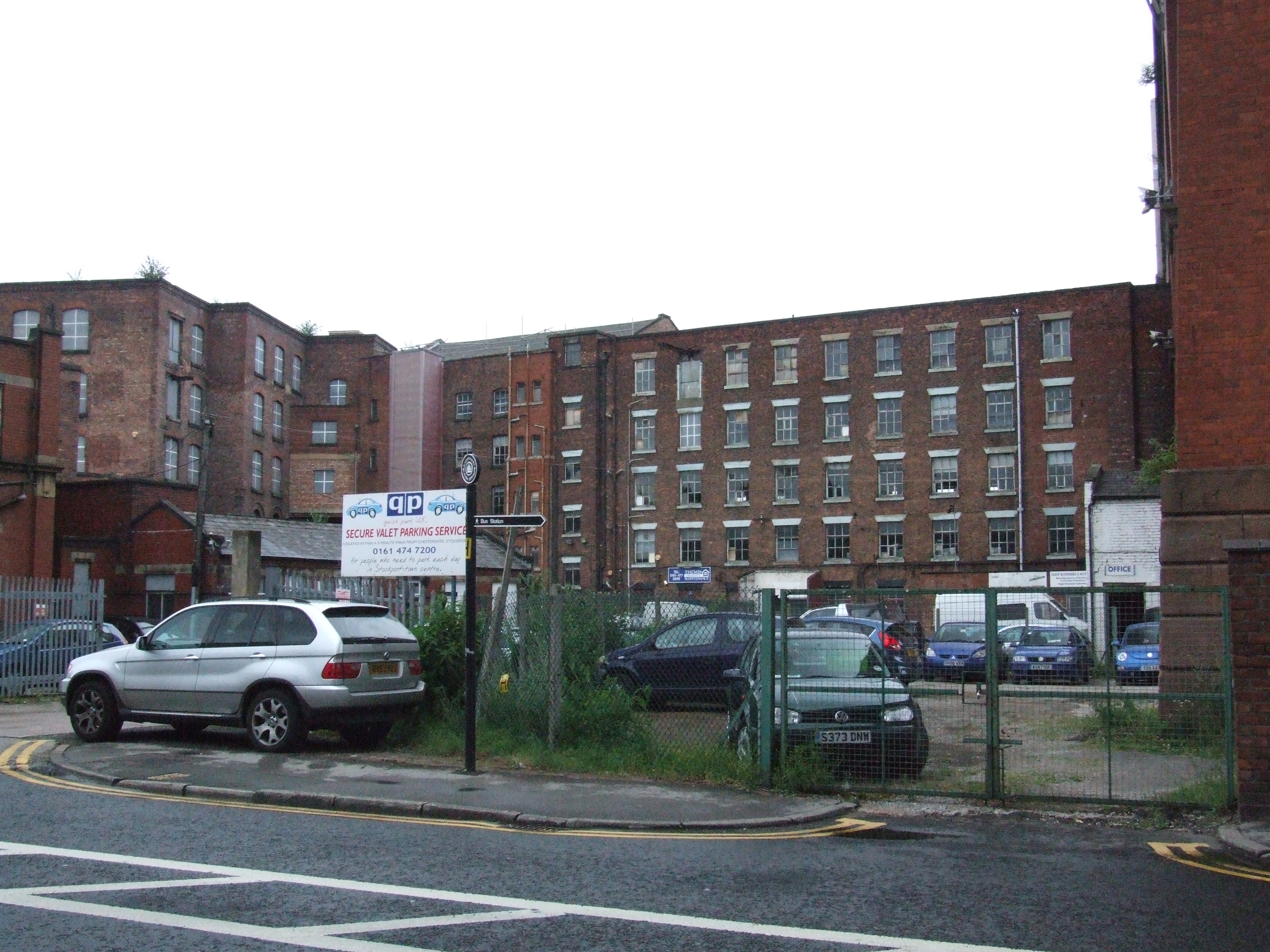
- Wear Mill

- Location in Greater Manchester

Spinning (Mule mill)
- Location: Cheadle Heath, Greater Manchester
- Owner: John Collier
- Further ownership: Thomas Fernley (1824); Fine Cotton Spinners & Doublers Ltd ()
- Coordinates: 53.4084°N 2.1654°W

Construction
- Built: 1790
- Renovated: 1884

Equipment
- No. of looms: 900 (1892)
- Mule Frames: 60,000 spindles (1892)

Listed Building – Grade II

Wear Mill (also known as Weir Mill) was an integrated cotton works on the Cheadle Heath bank of the River Mersey in Stockport, Greater Manchester, in England. It was started around 1790 and added to, particularly in 1831 and 1884. In 1840 the Stockport Viaduct was built over the river and over Wear Mill.

== Location ==
The original water-powered Wear Mill was built on the southern bank of the River Mersey, 500 m (1,600 ft) from its source at the confluence on the River Tame and the River Goyt. The turnpike to Manchester was 200 m (660 ft) to the east.

== History ==
The first record of a mill on this site was when John Collier, a cotton manufacturer built a mill on this site in 1790. It was water powered. The mill probably consisted of two multi-storey spinning mills and attached weaving sheds, one destroyed by fire in 1831 and the other rebuilt in 1884. Thomas Fernley bought the mill in 1824, and in 1831 needed to replace one mill with a new one that was of fireproof construction. This mill was eleven bays long and six storeys tall. The floors were sprung on transverse brick arches supported on cast iron columns. It was driven by a beam engine in an internal engine house to the east of the mill. It was over this engine house that the Manchester and Birmingham Railway built the Stockport Viaduct in 1840, and again when it widened in 1880. The second mill was replaced in 1884, but not the original wheelhouse. It is a five-storey, 15-bay mill of fireproof construction with narrow longitudinal vaults springing from iron joints. The original weaving sheds have been replaced with two-storey structures, creating a complex site.

=== Owners ===
- John Collier
- Thomas Fernley
- George Arthur Fernley
- Fine Cotton Spinners & Doublers Ltd

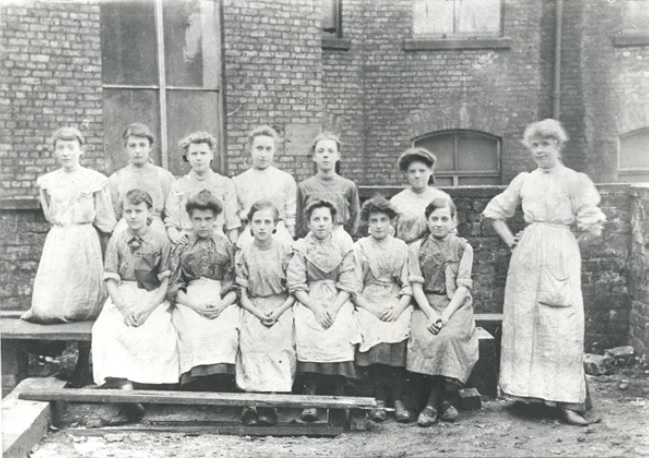
Employees at Wear Mill, c. 1907

== See also ==
- List of mills in Stockport
- Listed buildings in Stockport
- Textile manufacturing

== Bibliography ==
- Ashmore, Owen (1982). The industrial archaeology of North-west England and where to find it. Manchester University Press. ISBN 0-7190-0820-4.
- Roberts, A S (1921), "Arthur Robert's Engine List", Arthur Roberts Black Book., One guy from Barlick-Book Transcription, archived from the original on 23 July 2011
- Williams, Mike; Farnie (1992). Cotton Mills in Greater Manchester. Carnegie Publishing. ISBN 0-948789-89-1.
