= Palmer Mills, Stockport =

Former mills in Greater Manchester, England

Palmer Mills
- Location in Greater Manchester

Cotton
- Alternative names: Stockport Paper Mill

Spinning
- Current status: Demolished
- Location: Portwood, Stockport, Greater Manchester, England
- Serving canal: River Mersey
- Serving railway: Stockport, Timperley and Altrincham Junction Railway
- Further ownership: Lancashire Cotton Corporation (1929); Courtaulds (1964)
- Coordinates: 53.412993°N 2.147388°W

Construction
- Built: c. 19th century
- Demolished: 2002
- Floor count: 5
- Floor area: 200 by 150 feet (61 m × 46 m)

References
- Helen Clapcott

Palmer Mills were cotton spinning mills in Portwood, Stockport, Greater Manchester, England. Built in the late 19th century, they were taken over by the Lancashire Cotton Corporation in the 1930s and sold on. Renamed the Stockport Paper Mill, they survived into the 21st century when they were demolished to be replaced by modern businesses.

== Location ==
It lies on elevated ground on the River Mersey at the confluence of the rivers Goyt and Tame, 6.1 miles (9.8 km) southeast of the city of Manchester. Stockport is the largest settlement of the Metropolitan Borough of Stockport.

Historically a part of Cheshire, Stockport in the 16th century was a small town entirely on the southbank of the Mersey, and known for the cultivation of hemp and rope manufacture and in the 18th century the town had one of the first mechanised silk factories in the United Kingdom. However, Stockport's predominant industries of the 19th century were the cotton and allied industries. The Stockport Branch of the Ashton Canal terminated at the top of Lancashire Hill, in Heaton Norris, but Stockport was rich in railway connections. The Cheshire Lines Committee built their viaduct across the River Mersey and ran the Stockport, Timperley and Altrincham Junction Railway which serviced Portwood and Stockport Tiviot Dale railway station.

Portwood to the east of the town centre, alongside the River Goyt, was the location of many of Stockports Mills, Palmer Mills were adjacent to the Vernon Mill. Palmer Mill was on Mersey St reflecting the view at the time that the River Mersey started upstream at the confluence of the Goyt and the River Etherow.

== History ==
The industry peaked in 1912 when it produced 8 billion yards of cloth. The Great War of 1914–1918 halted the supply of raw cotton, and the British government encouraged its colonies to build mills to spin and weave cotton. The war over, Lancashire never regained its markets. The independent mills were struggling. The Bank of England set up the Lancashire Cotton Corporation in 1929 to attempt to rationalise and save the industry. Palmer Mills, Stockport was one of 104 mills bought by the LCC. It was sold on and became Stockport Paper Mills. It was finally demolished about 2002.

== Architecture ==
This was a five-storey brick built mill 200 by 150 feet (61 m × 46 m). There were ornamental lintels over the top storey lintels. The water tower at the north west corner and another tower at the northeast, there were corner turrets at the other two corners. The detached engine house survived the demolition of the mill. There was a subsidiary two-storey building to the east.

=== Power ===
Horizontal engine

=== Equipment ===
There were 167,000 spindles recorded in 1891, and 180,000 in 1920.

== Owners ==
- Lancashire Cotton Corporation (1930's-)
- Stockport Paper Mill

== See also ==
- Textile manufacturing
