= Wood Mill, Woodley =

Mill located by the River Tame in Stockport, Cheshire

Wood Mill
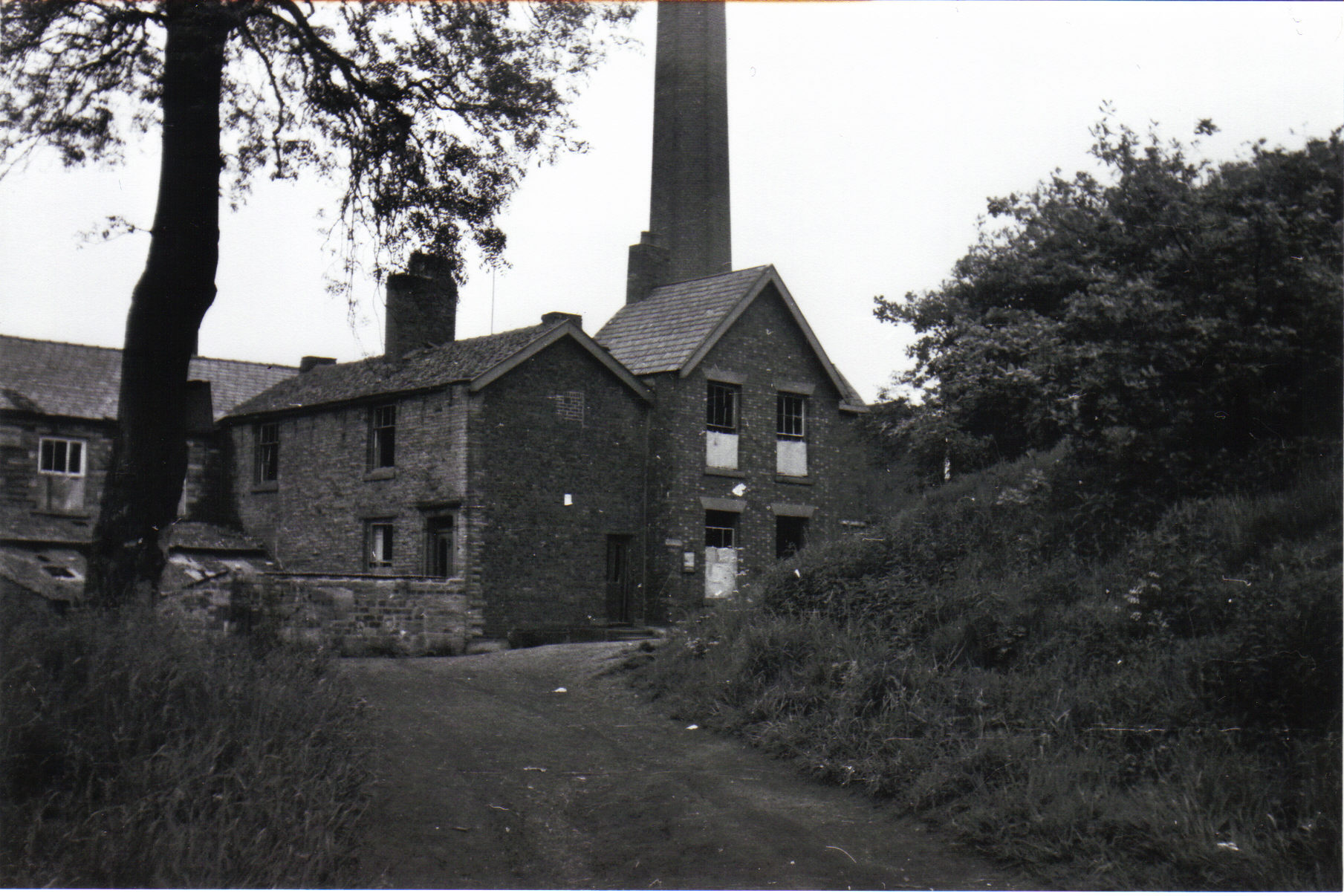
- Wood Mill, Woodley (1963)

- Location within Greater Manchester
- Location: Woodley, Greater Manchester
- Coordinates: 53.4325°N 2.1020°W

Construction
- Demolished: 1964

Wood Mill was a mill located by the River Tame in Stockport, Cheshire. Originally built in the early to mid 19th century and used as a bone mill. After 1848 the building was converted to a woollen mill and was rebuilt in 1864. In the 1930s, the building was used for colour and chemical manufacturing and demolished in 1964. The remains of the building are located on the bend of Lambeth Grove, Woodley between Wellington Works (occupied by Morrells Woodfinishes) and Riverside Kennels.

== History ==
In 1841, Wood Mill was owned by William Vaudrey and used as a bone mill, the final product of which was used to fertilise local land. Originally the mill was water powered using a fast flowing stream, running from Werneth Low, that ran alongside the building. There was also a water reservoir (mill dam) situated south of the building to increase the head of water available for the water wheel.

In 1864, John Lees Buckley acquired Wood Mill. It was at this time that Wood Mill was rebuilt to allow for fur blowing, carding and wool washing for the hatting industry. It was also around this time that the Buckley family rebuilt other mills in the area. Bottom Mill (then renamed Botany Mill, later changed to Wellington Works) in 1864, Top Mill in 1872 (extended in 1877) and Middle Mill in 1883 (later renamed Thorn Works). It is also known that the Buckley family ween keen Methodists, and in 1868 they built Woodley Methodist Church (rebuilt 1998).

Wood Mill being demolished in 1964 after the collapse of Ashbrooks (1932) Ltd.

In the 1930s Wood Mill was occupied by Ashbrooks (1932) Limited (directors: Frederick Fletcher & Gertrude Fletcher), manufactures of fine art colours, pigments and chemicals. It was during this period that the larger chimney was built for the use of a boiler. This company used the building until its subsequent demise in early 1964. It was later in this year that the building was demolished, however it wasn't until a number of years later when the chimney was taken down.

== Modern day ==
Currently, the site of Wood Mill is heavily overgrown with trees. However two stone walls survive, at around 3 metres in height. Alongside this is the remains of a concrete wall, built around 1950 and used to filter out chemicals and colours that would otherwise flow into the River Tame. Further up the stream is red brick wall with irrigation pipes inside. There is also a concrete floor/foundation running between the end of the stone wall and the start of the red brick wall. The water reservoir (mill dam) has since been drained, however there are still stone walls that were used to hold the water.

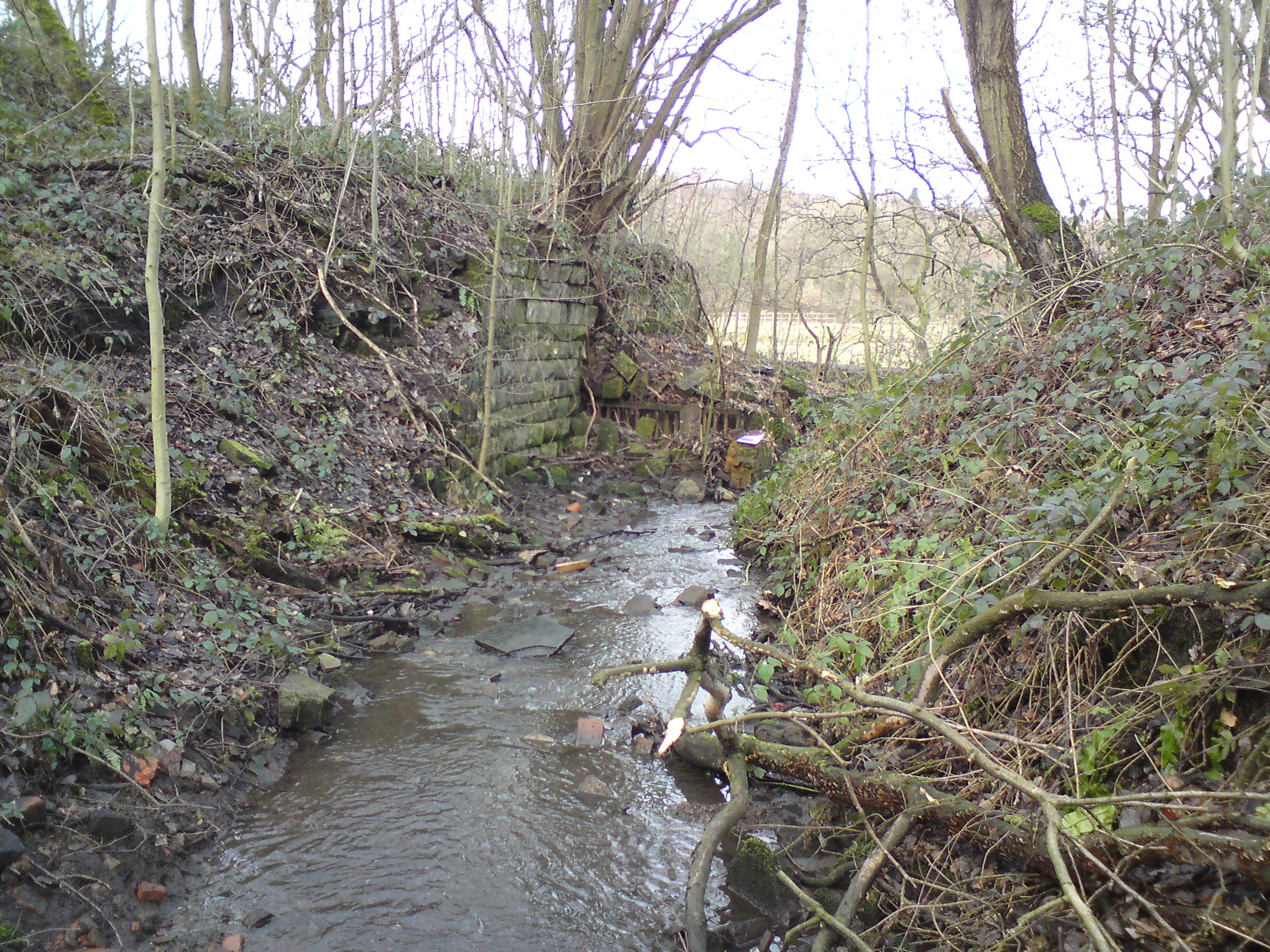
The stream at the site of Wood Mill, 2009, with stone wall on left.

== The stream ==
The stream running alongside Wood Mill can be mapped to a source from Werneth Low. After flowing under The Peak Forest Canal at Woodley Wharf, the water flows through an area that was once a Mill Dam for Top Mill. From here it goes through a culvert under Mill Pool Close into an area that was once the Mill Dam for Middle Mill (now known as Thorn Works). It is from here that it flows under the road once again, past Botany Mill (now Wellington Works) through a number of culverts until it surfaces alongside the site of Wood Mill, under the road and into the River Tame.

== See also ==
- List of mills in Stockport
- Woodley, Greater Manchester
