= Broadstone Mill, Reddish =

English cotton spinning mill

Broadstone Mill
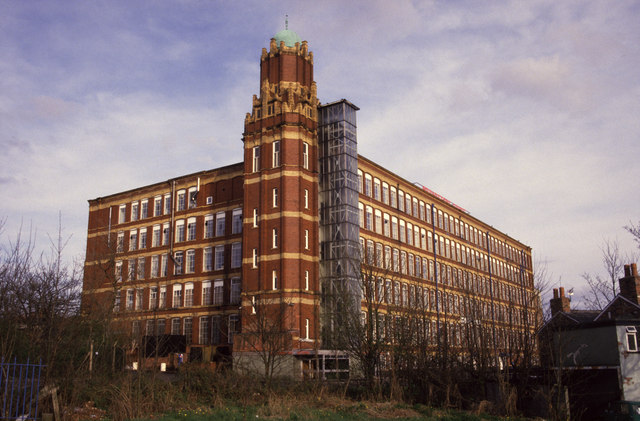
- Twin mill built 1903–1907

- Location within Greater Manchester

cotton
- Current status: Closed (1959)
- Owner: Broadstone Spinning Company
- Coordinates: SJ 892 930

Construction
- Built: 1903
- Completed: 1907
- Demolished: South building (1965); North building extant

Equipment
- Other Equipment: Spindles – 260,000

Listed Building – Grade II
- Official name: Broadstone House
- Designated: 10 March 1975
- Reference no.: 1356825

Broadstone Mill was a double cotton spinning mill on the eastern bank of the Stockport Branch Canal in Reddish, an area of the Metropolitan Borough of Stockport, Greater Manchester, England. Construction of the twin mills commenced in 1903 and was completed in 1907. They closed in 1957, and the southern mill and engine houses were demolished in 1965. The northern block went into multiple usage. It is now part of the Houldsworth Village development and used as a centre for small businesses, and a shopping outlet.

== Location ==
The double mills were built next to Houldsworth's Reddish Mills, fronting on the Stockport Branch Canal. It is close to Reddish South railway station on the Stockport–Stalybridge line.

== History ==
The Broadstone Spinning Co., Ltd., Reddish, was incorporated in 1903, with the intention of erecting a large double mill. No. 1 mill covered 7,658 square yards, and No. 2 mill 8,457 square yards. Each mill was six storeys tall, 270 feet (82 m) long by 143 feet (44 m). Work commenced on No. 1 mill at the end of 1906, and No. 2 mill a year later. The mills contained 260,000 spinning mules, and cost £480,000 when fully equipped. They were entitled to draw water for the condensers directly from the canal at no cost. In 1919 the mills were sold to the Broadstone Mills Limited.

The decline of cotton spinning was accompanied by high farce. In November 1958, the company sold a number of spinning mules as scrap for just over £3,000. By agreement, the machines remained in the mill over the winter. A small number had been broken and removed by April 1959, when the government announced a compensation package for firms that agreed to scrap spinning capacity. As the title in the mules had passed to the scrapman, it was decided that the company was not entitled to compensation amounting to over £60,000, despite the fact that the machinery was still on its premises. Actions in the High Court and the Court of Appeal in 1965 were fruitless.

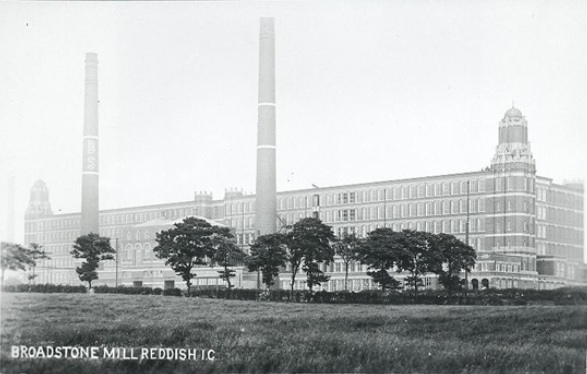
Broadstone Mill c. 1907, including the now demolished southern mill

== Architecture ==
This was a large six-storey double mill with 260,000 spindles. It was built by Stott and Sons, and its features were described as Byzantine in style. Each mill was 12 bays wide and nine bays deep, the rope race forming a 13th bay. The basic bay dimensions were 22 feet (6.7 m) by 15 feet 6 inches (4.72 m), thus, the internal dimensions at the second floor were 266 feet (81 m) by 137 feet (42 m). The rope race is 12 feet (3.7 m) wide internally. At ground floor level a single storey card shed extends the width of the mill; this is five bays, 68 feet (21 m) deep.

The floors were designed for the machines they accommodated. The basement was designed for the waste place, conditioning cellar, warehouse and packing, cotton room, mixing room, and dust cellar; it was 8 feet 6 inches (2.59 m) in height. The ground floor (known as the first storey) was 16 feet (4.9 m), the attached card shed and blowing room was 12 feet (3.7 m) in height. The first spinning room on the second storey was 14 feet 3 inches (4.34 m) high. The second and third spinning rooms on the third and fourth storeys were 13 feet 9 inches (4.19 m) high, while the fourth spinning room on the fifth storey was 14 feet 1.75 inches (4.3117 m) high. The tower contained the staircase, hoist and toilets.

=== Power ===
Each mill was powered by a George Saxon & Co 1,500 hp triple expansion inverted vertical steam engines, with Corliss valves. They were powered by steam at 200 psi and ran at 75 rpm. The cylinders have 22in, 35in and 54in bores, and 4 ft stroke.

Each mill had its own boiler house with four, 30 feet (9.1 m) x 8 feet (2.4 m) Lancashire boilers, and its own 75 yards (69 m) high chimney. The chimney had a square base to 33 feet (10 m) then was circular tapering from 18 feet (5.5 m) to 10 feet 10 inches (3.30 m) diameter. The flue was 8 feet (2.4 m) in diameter; there was an inner casing wall to approximately 88 feet (27 m).

=== Equipment ===
All machinery in both mills were supplied by John Hetherington & Co. Ltd. The first mill had mules with 125,000 spindles and the second mill held 140,000 spindles, giving a total of 265,000 for the two mills.

== Usage ==
Originally they spun best Egyptian cottons, in what was technically termed "combed" and "super carded yarns." The range of counts was 160s to 30s for the home and export trade, and they employed 700 people.

=== Owners ===
- Broadstone Spinning Company Ltd.
- Broadstone Mills Ltd.
- Multi usage
- Part of the Houldsworth Village – shopping outlet, small business units

== Current usage ==
The mill is currently part of the Houldsworth Village Development, and since closing in 1957 has been redeveloped and transformed into a large shopping outlet and business centre, containing offices, conferencing centres, and a creative gallery. Redevelopments were made on the first floor, in order to expand the retail outlet onto two levels.

== Notable events/media ==
When completed, Broadstone Mill was the largest cotton spinning mill in the world. The previous largest, Houldsworth Mill, stands 200 metres (660 ft) to the north.

== See also ==
- Houldsworth Mill
- List of mills in Stockport
- Listed buildings in Stockport
- Textile manufacturing
