= Houldsworth Mill =

Cotton mill in Reddish, Greater Manchester, England

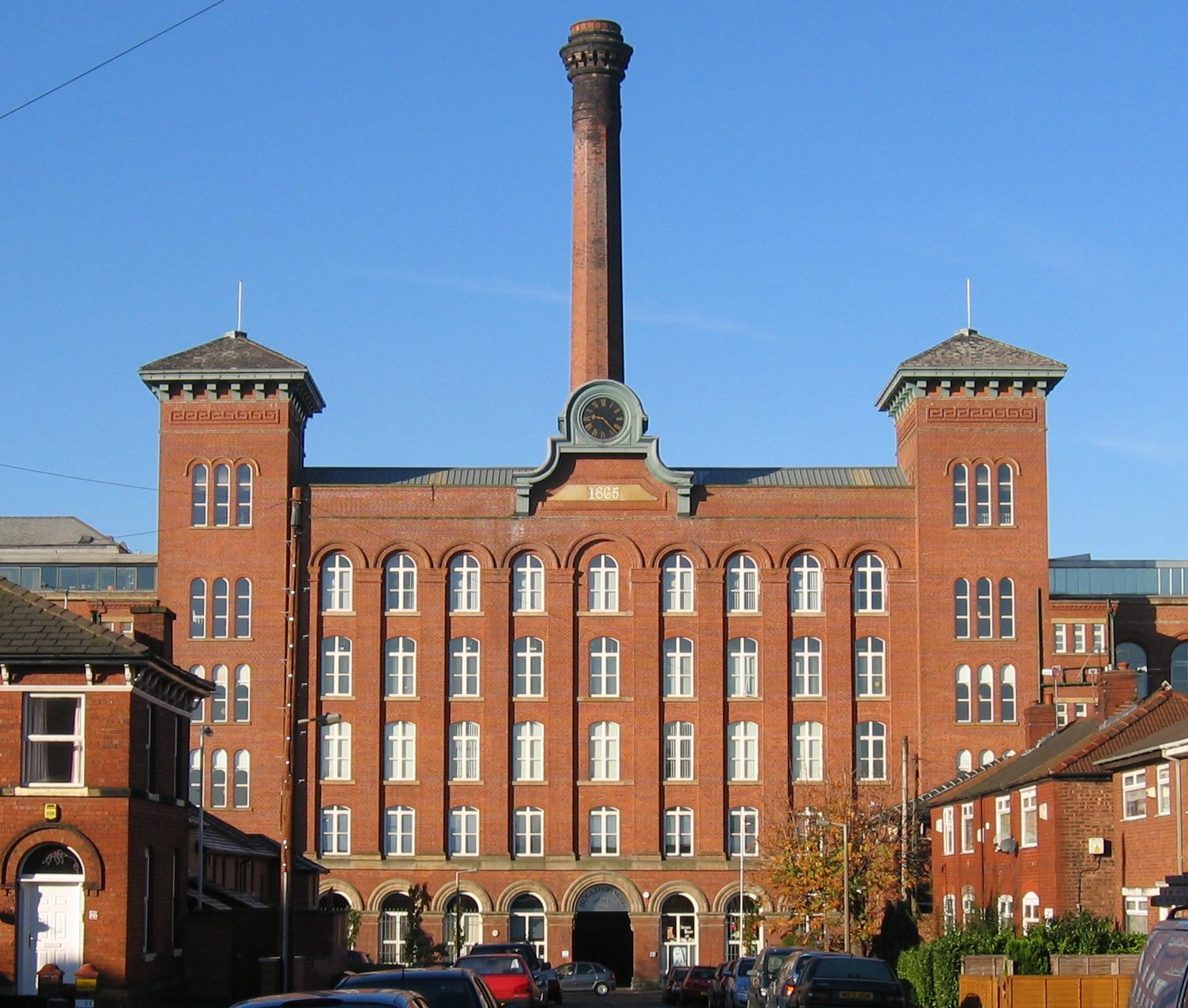
- The main entrance in 2006

- Location in Greater Manchester

Cotton
- Alternative names: Reddish Mill
- Spindles: 136,692

Combined spinning weaving
- Structural system: North mill, Central engine house, South mill, red engineering brick
- Location: Houldsworth Street, Reddish, Greater Manchester, England
- Serving canal: Stockport Branch Canal, Ashton Canal
- Client: William Houldsworth
- Further ownership: Fine Cotton Spinners' Association by merger (1898); John Myer's Mail Order Warehouse (1950s)
- Current owners: Heaton and Houldsworth Property Company
- Current tenants: Various
- Coordinates: 53.4363°N 2.1656°W

Construction
- Built: 1863
- Completed: 1865
- Employees: 454
- Renovated: 1999
- Size: 64 acres (260,000 m^{2})
- Floor count: 4 plus cellar
- Floor area: 400,000 square feet (37,000 m^{2})

Design team
- Architect: Abraham Henthorn Stott
- Awards and prizes and listings: Grade II* listed

Equipment
- Cotton count: 80s to 250s
- Mule Frames: 136,692

References
- Astle 1922, p. 145

Houldsworth Mill, also known as Reddish Mill, is a Grade II* listed former cotton mill on Houldsworth Street in Reddish, an area of the Metropolitan Borough of Stockport, Greater Manchester, England. Designed by Abraham Henthorn Stott and completed in 1865 for the mill-owner William Houldsworth, it ceased cotton production in the 1950s and was later used as a warehouse by the mail‑order firm John Myers. After trading ended in the 1970s the building became largely vacant and fell into disrepair. It was converted in 1999 by Stephenson Bell to provide apartments, start‑up space for businesses, and commercial and leisure uses on the lower floors.

== History ==
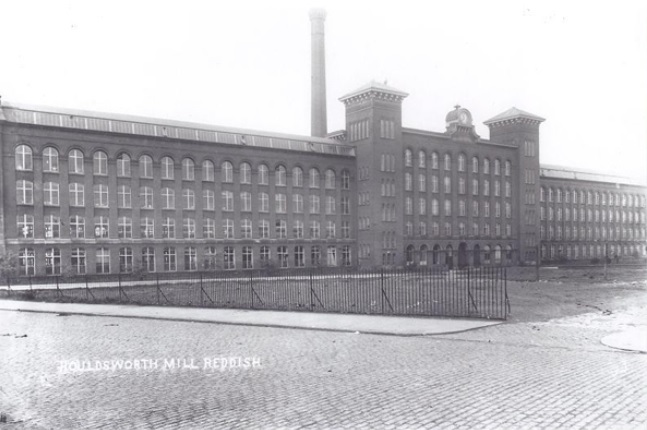
Houldsworth Mill, c. 1900

Reddish mill was built by Stott and Sons for William Houldsworth, and opened in 1865. It covers 64 acres (260,000 m^{2}), and employed 454 workers.

In 1898 it amalgamated with the Fine Cotton Spinners Association. The mill had 136,692 spindles and at one time spun counts of 700 and 800, but normally 80s to 250s.

Cotton production at Houldsworth Mill ceased in the 1950s. The mill was sold to a mail-order catalogue company, John Myers, and was used principally as a warehouse. In the late 1960s, the building was expanded with a five-storey extension to the rear of the north end of the mill. This was built of glass and concrete in the style of the period.

Mail-order trading ceased in the 1970s, and the mill was sold. It was divided into separate business units, but most of the building remained vacant and it fell into a state of disrepair.

On 10 March 1975, Houldsworth Mill was designated a Grade II* listed building.

=== Restoration ===
The pilot study for restoration was part-funded by English Heritage. The refurbishment was funded by:

- The mill's owners (Heaton and Houldsworth Property Company)
- Northern Counties Housing Association (and Housing Corporation)
- English Partnerships
- European Regional Development Fund
- Stockport Metropolitan Borough Council (SMBC)
- Various anchor tenants, including Ridge Danyers College and Kingfisher Pools

This mill was converted by Stephenson Bell architects. It provides 70 apartments, start-up units for emerging high-technology and arts-based businesses with commercial and leisure uses at the lower floors to provide active frontages.

== Architecture ==
The 1865 mill consists of two five-storeyed blocks of 18 bays, with a narrower nine-bay central block for warehousing and offices. The central block has two Italianate stair towers and carries a central clock. The floors have become wider to accommodate the larger mules of the period. All floors are fireproof, with transverse vaults.

The detached engine house used horizontal shafts that connected to vertical shafts in each spinning block. The chimney was octagonal, on a plinth with a highly embellished oversailer (bricks that project beyond those beneath them). In the early 20th century, this was replaced with separate inverted compound engines for each block, with external rope races (grooves or tracks in which a rope runs through a pulley-block) for rope drives.

== See also ==
- Broadstone Mill, Reddish
- Grade II* listed buildings in Greater Manchester
- List of mills in Stockport
- Listed buildings in Stockport
