= Vernon Mill, Stockport =

Cotton mill in Greater Manchester, England

Vernon
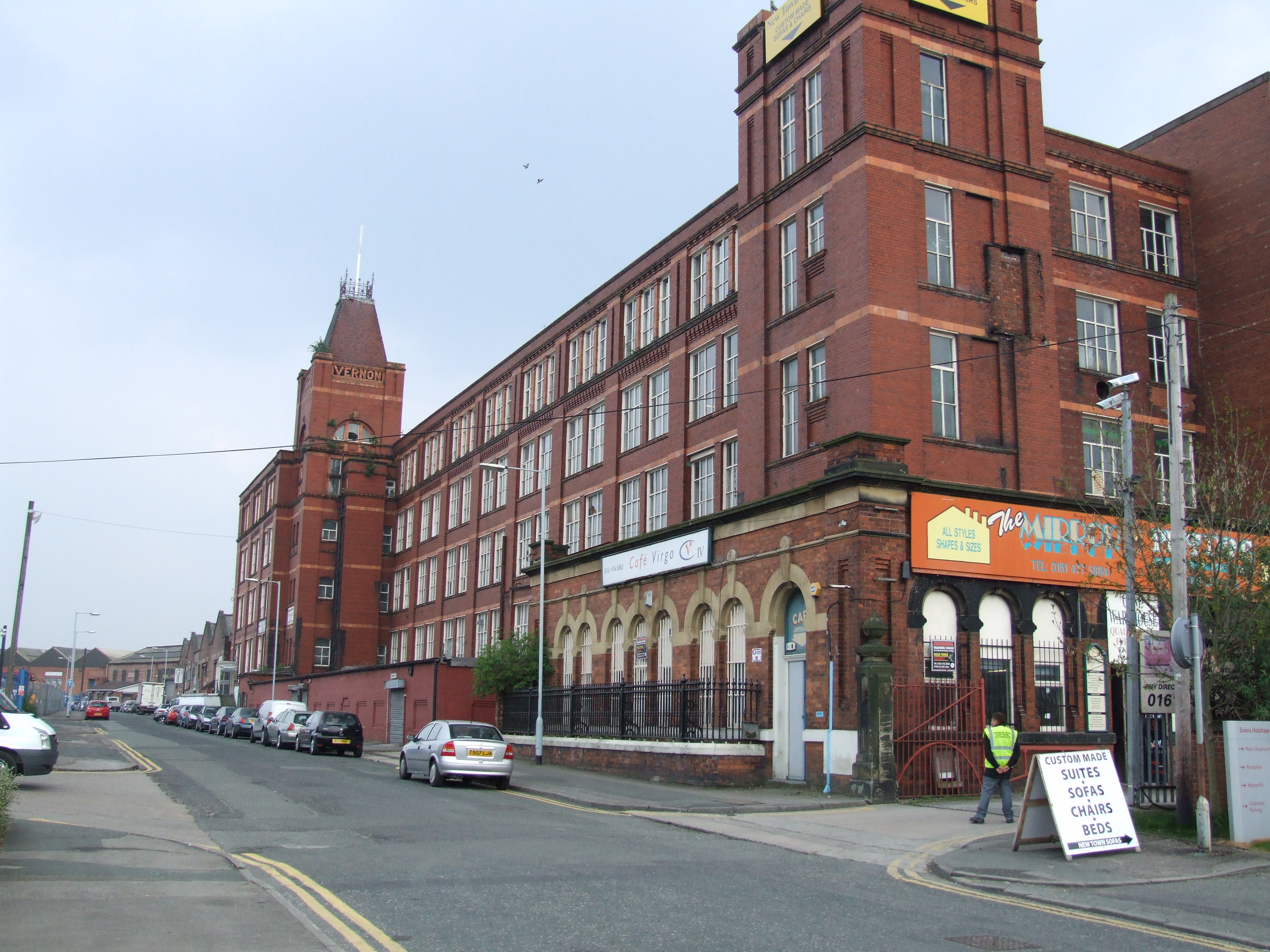
- Vernon Mill in 2011

- Location in Greater Manchester

Spinning
- Location: Portwood, Stockport, Greater Manchester, England
- Owner: Vernon Spinning Co
- Further ownership: Vernon Mills (1920); Lancashire Cotton Corporation (1930); Courtaulds (1964)
- Coordinates: 53.4143°N 2.1457°W

Construction
- Floor count: 6

Design team
- Architecture Firm: Joseph Stott and Son

Equipment

Listed Building – Grade II
- Official name: Vernon Mill
- Designated: 4 November 1996
- Reference no.: 1268055

References
- Helen Clapcott

Vernon Mill is a former cotton spinning mill in Portwood, Stockport, Greater Manchester, England. Built in 1881, it was taken over by the Lancashire Cotton Corporation in 1930 and later sold on. Although still in business use, it is now a Grade II listed building.

== Location ==
Stockport is a large town in Greater Manchester, England. It lies on elevated ground on the River Mersey at the confluence of the rivers Goyt and Tame, 6.1 miles (9.8 km) southeast of the city of Manchester. The town of Stockport is the largest settlement within the Metropolitan Borough of Stockport.

Historically a part of Cheshire, in the 16th-century Stockport was a small town entirely on the south bank of the Mersey, and known for the cultivation of hemp and the manufacture of rope. In the 18th-century, the town had one of the first mechanised silk factories in the United Kingdom. However, Stockport's predominant industries of the 19th-century were the cotton and allied industries. The Stockport branch of the Ashton Canal terminated at the top of Lancashire Hill, in Heaton Norris, but Stockport was rich in railway connections. The Cheshire Lines Committee (CLC) ran the Stockport, Timperley and Altrincham Junction Railway (ST&AJR) which serviced Portwood and Stockport Tiviot Dale railway station.

Portwood to the east of the town centre, alongside the River Goyt, was the location of many of Stockport's mills, and Vernon Mill was adjacent to the Palmer Mills. Vernon Mill was on Mersey Street, reflecting the view at the time that the River Mersey started upstream at the confluence of the Goyt and the River Etherow.

== History ==
The mill was designed by architects Joseph Stott and Son. The foundation stone was laid on 31 October 1881; it was the first limited liability cotton mill to open in Stockport.

The industry peaked in 1912 when it produced eight billion yards of cloth. The First World War (1914–1918) halted the supply of raw cotton, and the British government encouraged its colonies to build mills to spin and weave cotton by themselves. Once the war was over, Lancashire never regained its markets and the independent mills were struggling. The Bank of England set up the Lancashire Cotton Corporation in 1929 to attempt to rationalise and save the industry. Vernon Mill was one of 104 mills bought by the LCC, and one of the 53 mills that survived through to 1950. It is still standing, occupied by multiple businesses including a gym, a boxing gym, and various art studios. Vernon Mill was purchased by ZS Properties (Mcr) Ltd in October 2018.

=== Owners ===
- Vernon Cotton Spinning Co
- Vernon Mills (1920–1930)
- Lancashire Cotton Corporation (1930–1964)
- Courtaulds (1964–)
- ZS Properties (Mcr) Ltd (2018–present) current owners

=== Tenants ===
- Vernon Mill Artists, an artist led group with 43 active members working from studios

== See also ==
- Listed buildings in Stockport
- Textile manufacturing

== Bibliography ==
- Dunkerley, Philip (2009). "Dunkerley-Tuson Family Website, The Regent Cotton Mill, Failsworth". Archived from the original on 23 March 2008.
- LCC (1951). The mills and organisation of the Lancashire Cotton Corporation Limited. Blackfriars House, Manchester: Lancashire Cotton Corporation Limited.
- Roberts, A S (1921), "Arthur Robert's Engine List", Arthur Roberts Black Book, One guy from Barlick-Book Transcription, archived from the original on 23 July 2011
