= List of mills in Wigan =

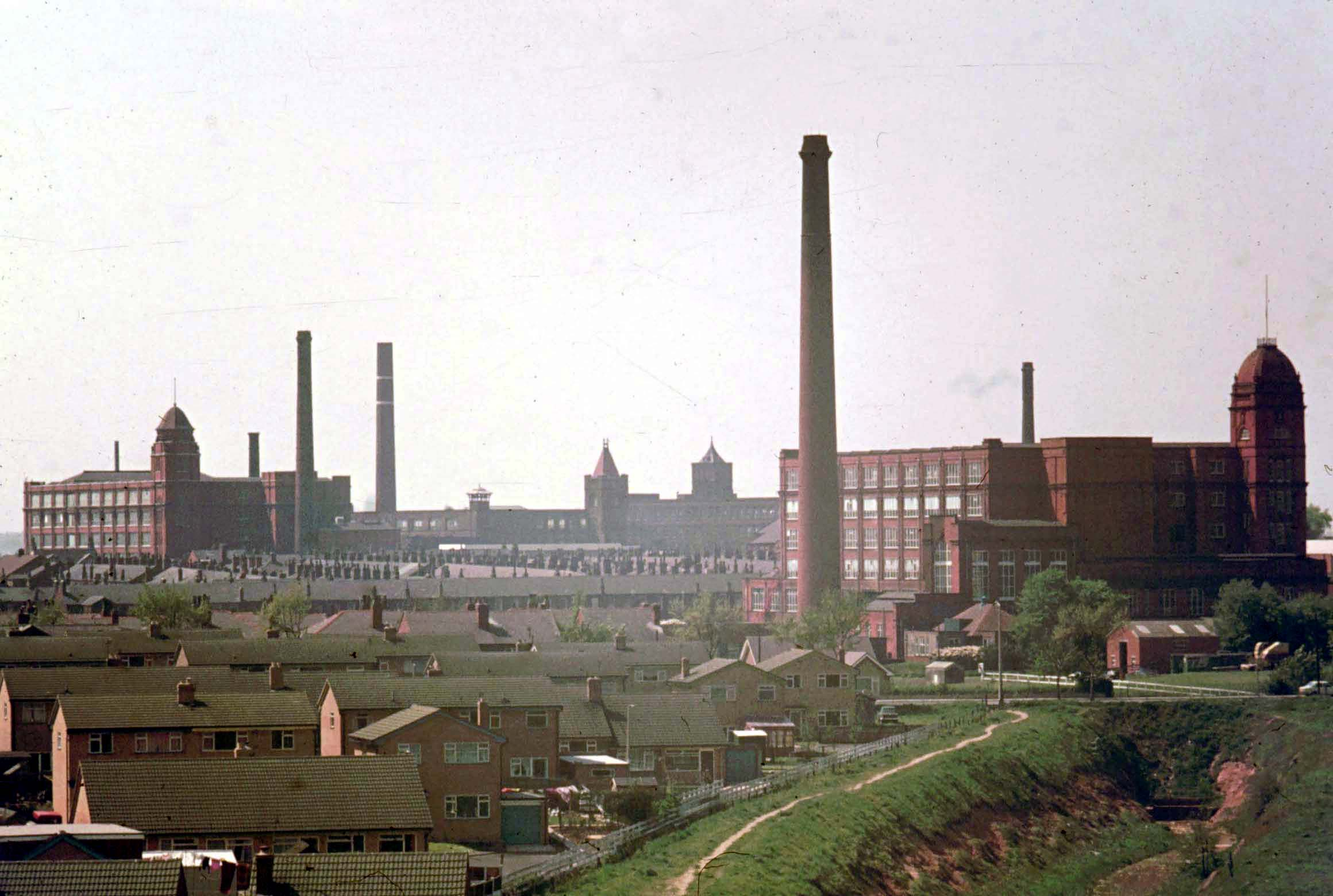
Leigh skyline in 1974.

This is a list of cotton spinning mills, weaving sheds, bleachers and dyers and other textile mills in the Metropolitan Borough of Wigan in Greater Manchester, England. They were in the towns, townships and villages of Ashton-in-Makerfield, Aspull, Astley, Atherton, Bedford, Leigh, Golborne, Haigh Hindley Ince-in-Makerfield, Orrell, Pennington, Leigh, Standish, Tyldesley, Westleigh, Leigh and Wigan which were historically in Lancashire but are now part of the Metropolitan Borough of Wigan since its creation by the Local Government Act 1972. The textile industry in the Wigan and Leigh areas grew out of a domestic putting-out system particularly fustians. Cotton, imported through the Port of Liverpool became more important in the late-18th century and more so after the advent of the Bridgewater and Leeds and Liverpool Canals and after that the first railways, the Bolton and Leigh and Liverpool and Manchester Railways. Wigan fabric was a stout cloth made from coarse cotton.

The Wigan borough has few fast-flowing streams to provide water power and consequently there were few factories until steam power became available. In the 19th century, textile mills on the Lancashire Coalfield were powered by cheap easily accessible coal. In 1818 Wigan had eight mills in the Wallgate area and it developed as a cotton town in Victorian times. From 1889 until the First World War the largest ring spinning company in Britain was Farington, Eckersley & Co of Western and Swan Meadow Mills.

After 1827 a silk industry grew in the Leigh parish and silk fabrics were woven on domestic hand looms and in weaving sheds using silk yarn supplied from Macclesfield or Leek by agents from Manchester. In the mid-19th century silk weaving employed a significant number of people. Domestic weavers travelled from the surrounding townships to and from the agents' warehouses in Leigh. At its peak in 1830 about 10,000 people, mostly domestic, were employed in silk weaving in the parish, after which the numbers declined to 8,000 in 1841 and 2,301 in 1871. By 1836 the town had 20 silk firms, 15 in 1848, five by 1876 and two in 1897. Powered weaving was introduced from the 1850s reducing the number of domestic weavers required. Some manufacturers employed weavers in their homes and in weaving sheds. Bickham and Pownall owners of Stanley Mill employed 1,000 workers of which 500–600 worked in the mill and the rest in their homes. There were nine silk weaving sheds in 1870 but most were converted as cotton took over. In 1891 Samuel Brown at Brook Mill, George Griffin on Brewery Lane and Charles Hilton and Son in Charles Street, all in Bedford were manufacturing silk fabrics.

In 1911 in Leigh, 6,146 people were employed in the cotton industry and from 1913, measured by the number of spindles, it was the fifth-largest spinning centre in Greater Manchester. Cotton weaving was concentrated at Kirkhall Lane Mills built in 1836 and at Jones Brothers Bedford New Mills started in 1834 which developed into an integrated mill for spinning and weaving. In the early-20th century three large weaving sheds were constructed at Foundry Street, Elizabeth Street and Etherstone Street. For cotton spinning, multi-storey mills with massive floor areas were developed. In Westleigh, the Victoria Mills (Hayes Mills) off Kirkhall Lane were built from 1856 by James and John Hayes who had three mills by 1887. By 1902 Tunnicliffe and Hampson had built the three Firs Mills. Two clusters of mills were built in Bedford, along the Bedford Brook and in the 20th century, near the Bridgewater Canal. The design of the surviving late-19th and early 20th-century factories along the Bridgewater Canal in Bedford is an example of the peak of the Lancashire mill-building tradition. Combined Egyptian Mills, a joint-stock company formed in 1929 with headquarters at Howe Bridge Mills in Atherton, was the second largest cotton-spinning company in the world with 34 mills and 3.2 million spindles.

== Ashton in Makerfield ==
Name	Architect	Location	Built	Demolished	Served (Years)
Makerfield Mill		Ashton in Makerfield, SJ 580,987 53°28′59″N 2°38′02″W			

== Aspull ==
Name	Architect	Location	Built	Demolished	Served (Years)
Dicconson Mill		Aspull SD 630,073 53°33′40″N 2°33′36″W		Demolished	
	Notes: In 1891 John Leigh and Brothers owned the mill which contained 20,000 spindles. The last part burnt down in about 2000. Now a housing estate. Electricity sub-station survives.				

== Astley ==
Name	Architect	Location	Built	Demolished	Served (Years)
Arrowsmiths Mill		Astley Green SJ 701,998 53°29′38″N 2°27′04″W	1833	1951	118
	Notes: James and Robert Arrowsmith built the mill at Astley Green next to the Bridgewater Canal on land they leased in 1833. The mill was four storeys high with a pitched roof and a square tapered chimney. Between 1872 and 1951 the company traded as T & C H Arrowsmith Ltd. In 1892 the mill had 10,000 spindles and 500 looms weaving fustians, velvets, angolas and twills. In 1919 a new engine house and weaving sheds were built around the old structure. Mining subsidence from Astley Green Colliery damaged the foundations of the old mill and in 1951, it closed.				

== Atherton ==
Name	Architect	Location	Built	Demolished	Served (Years)
Atherton Mill		Hindsford SD 686,022 53°30′58″N 2°28′30″W	1839	late 1980s	
	Notes: In 1839, James Burton built the Atherton Mill in Hindsford. It was the first of the group of mills he built near the Hindsford Brook. The site was later occupied by Ward and Goldstone.				
Victoria Mill		Atherton SD 680,033 53°31′30″N 2°29′02″W	1860	Standing	97
	Notes: Atherton Spinning Company built its first mill with a capital of £50,000 on Bolton Old Road in 1860 and two more mills were built behind it. In 1891 Victoria Mill on Bolton Old Road was operated by the Atherton Cotton Spinning Company. It had 69,000 spindles. The company ceased spinning in 1957 and the old mill was demolished while the other two were put to other uses.				
Dan Lane Mills		Atherton SD 676,030 53°31′23″N 2°29′24″W			
	Notes: Dan Lane Mill, constructed between Dan Lane and Lee Street around 1840, was the first large spinning and doubling mill in Atherton. Dan Lane was renamed Tyldesley Road when a new road through Hindsford was built around 1899. In 1891 the mill was operated by the Lee Spinning Company and had 50,000 spindles. The company had a warehouse in Mosley Street, Manchester. Most of the mill has been demolished but in May 2012 some disused buildings were set alight by youths.				
Ena Mill	G Temperley & Son	Atherton SD 673,035 53°31′37″N 2°29′42″W	1908	In use	
	Notes: The five-storey Ena Mill or E Mill is a Grade II listed building built in red brick with buff decoration in 1908. It was designed by G Temperley & Son of Bolton. It has a two-storey extension for carding, a tower with a flat top and an engine house and chimney bearing its name. Carrington Viyella operated it in the 1980s. It is occupied by retail units and the Atherton Office of Wigan and Leigh Housing.				
Field Mill		Hindsford SD 686,022 53°30′58″N 2°28′44″W	1863		62
	Notes: James Burton's Field Mill was built in 1856 in Lodge Lane at its junction with Printshop Lane in Hindsford just north of the Hindsford Brook. In 1891 Burton's mills had 157,196 spindles and 570 looms weaving fine cambrics and shirtings.				
Howe Bridge Mills		Atherton SD 673,033 53°31′30″N 2°29′42″W	1868	2014	97
	Notes: The first of six mills for Howe Bridge Mills on the north side of Mealhouse Lane was built in 1865 by the directors of Fletcher, Burrows and Company. The company owned the collieries in Howe Bridge and Hindsford. The last mill was built in 1919. In 1929 the company joined Combined Egyptian Mills and Howe Bridge Mills became the company's headquarters. The company's name changed to Combined English Mills in 1953 and subsequently was owned by Viyella. Numbers 2 and 5 mills were demolished in 1965. The Howe Bridge Spinning Company was the fourth largest such company in Lancashire in 1891 with 250,000 spindles and in 1922 had 700,000 spindles.				
Laburnum Mills		Atherton SD 682,038 53°31′48″N 2°28′53″W	1905	1984	79
	Notes: Laburnum Mill was a twin spinning mill on Upton Road near Atherton Central Station. The four-storey east mill was built in 1905 in red brick. It was 36 bays long with large rectangular windows and had a basement and a water tower with stone decoration and a dome behind balustrades. The west mill was built to a similar design. Its engine house had semi-circular arched windows with square windows above and had a tall circular chimney. Carrington Viyella operated the mill in the 1980s. Fred Dibnah demolished the mill chimney in November 1983 and the mill's ornate tower in January 1984.				
Lodge Mill		Hindsford SD 685,022 53°30′54″N 2°28′34″W	1853		72
	Notes: Lodge Mill was built in 1853 by James Burton in Hindsford, close to the Hindsford Brook on Tyldesley Road at its junction with Lodge Lane.				
Westfield Mill		Hindsford SD 682,022 53°30′54″N 2°28′48″W	1853		72
	Notes: Westfield Mill was the last of James Burton's mills built in Hindsford. It was next to Field Mill on Lodge Lane.				

== Bedford, Leigh ==
Name	Architect	Location	Built	Demolished	Served (Years)
Alder Mill	Stott and Sons	Leigh SJ 670,996 53°29′33″N 2°29′57″W	1907	1982	71
	Notes: Alder Mill in Clyde Street, Bedford, Leigh, was designed by Henthorn Scott in 1907 in reinforced concrete. It was a spinning mill of five storeys high and basement, engine house and single-story card room. Clad in red brick with decorative terracotta bands the mill was 36 bays long with arched windows and 15 bays wide. It had an ornate brick and terracotta water tower at its north-east corner. In the 1980s the mill was operated by Carrington Vyella. Its matching decorative office building was left standing after the mill's demolition and is a grade II listed building. The mill had a 1,800 horsepower vertical triple expansion engine made by Browett, Lindley & Co. It had 122,000 mule spindles spinning fine and superfine counts supplied by Dobson & Barlow of Bolton.				
Bedford New Mills		Bedford SD 667,001 53°29′49″N 2°30′11″W			
	Notes: Bedford New Mills were started in 1834 by J. and G. Jones who had earlier built Tyldesley New Mill. The mill was of five-storeys with large rectangular windows, a water tower with a dome and a tall circular chimney. Its engine house stood to the north and a reservoir was to the east. Bedford New Mills was operated by Jones Brothers and Co in 1891. The mill had 53,000 spindles and 970 looms weaving twills, shirtings and cambrics. The company's Manchester warehouse was in York Street. In the 1980s the mill was operated by Courtaulds.				
Bedford Spinning Company		Bedford SD 665,996 53°29′24″N 2°30′22″W			
	Notes: Bedford Spinning Company was located between Avon Street and the Bridgewater Canal. It was built after 1905.				
Brook Mill		Bedford SD 663,002 53°29′49″N 2°30′32″W			
	Notes: In 1891 Samuel Brown owned Brook Mill, a silk weaving mill on High Street with 460 looms.				
Brooklands Mill (Mather Lane No 3)		Bedford SJ 664,996 53°29′31″N 2°30′29″W			
	Notes: Brooklands Mill was built in brick in 1893 on the south bank of the Bridgewater Canal. It is of five storeys with a water tower, engine house and chimney. The mill was powered by a 1,200 h.p. cross-compound steam engine supplied by J & E Wood of Bolton.				
Brookside Mill		Bedford SD 661,003 52°35′56″N 2°30′07″W			
	Notes: Brookside Mill was a weaving shed on Charles Street owned by Gamble and Smith who also owned Welch Mill. In 1891 it housed 832 looms. After closing the property was used for light engineering.				
Butts Mill	Stott and Sons	Bedford SJ 667,994 53°29′28″N 2°30′10″W	1905	Standing	120
	Notes: Butts Mill was built next to the Leigh branch of the Bridgewater Canal in 1905 to the designs of Stott and Sons, the six-storey mill has a steel frame faced with red brick and a flat roof. It has an ornate tower with a terracotta Arts and Crafts details and parapet and is topped by a copper dome and finial. The mill was used for carding on the lower three floors and spinning on the upper. The carding floors have large nine-light rectangular windows separated by narrow brick piers while the spinning floors have narrower windows and brick panels. The mill's hoist tower is a single window wide capped by the mill's name BUTTS in white tiles. It was designed as a double mill but only half was built. The 150,000 mule spindles were supplied by Dobson & Barlow of Bolton and its 2500 hp engine was by Carels Frères of Ghent in Belgium. Ceased spinning in 1960, the mill was later sold to Ward and Goldstone.				
Charles Street Mill		Bedford, SD 660,003 53°29′53″N 2°30′50″W			
Hall Lane Mill	Stott and Sons	Leigh SJ 663,996 53°29′31″N 2°30′32″W	1907		118
	Notes: Hall Lane was a mule spinning mill started with £80,000 capital. Its 100,000 mule spindles were supplied by Richard Threlfall of Bolton. Its 1500hp engine was by George Saxon & Co of Manchester.				
Leigh Manufacturing Co	Stott and Sons	Bedford SJ 668,996 53°29′31″N 2°30′07″W	1908		117
	Notes: This was Stott and Sons last weaving shed. It housed1000 looms. Its 500hp engine was supplied by Yates and Thom of Blackburn.				
Leigh Spinners (Leigh Mill)	Bradshaw Gass & Hope	Bedford SJ 674,997 53°29′35″N 2°29′35″W	1913	Standing	112
	Notes: Leigh Spinners or Leigh Mill, a double spinning mill, is a Grade II* listed building built for the Horrocks Company close to the Bridgewater Canal. The east mill, boiler house and chimney were built in 1913 to the designs of Bradshaw, Gass & Hope and the west mill was completed to match in 1923. The mill's spinning machinery was supplied by Platt Brothers of Oldham and a Yates and Thom steam engine, one of a pair named Mayor and Mayoress, survives in working order.				
Mather Lane Mill	Bradshaw Gass & Hope	Bedford SJ 663,997 53°29′35″N 2°30′32″W	1883	Standing	142
	Notes: The first mill became operational in 1878, a second mill opened in 1883 and the third, Brooklands Mill, in 1891. In the 1920s the company was merged into Combined Egyptian Mills Ltd. Mather Lane Mill is a Grade II Listed cotton spinning mill on the north bank of the Bridgewater Canal. It was built in 1882 to the designs of Bradshaw and Gas and notable for its severe classical elevations. It is an important early factory design by the architects and has features unusual for its date including a square plan, flat roof and a partly-internal engine house. The mill has six storeys and a basement built in brick in English garden wall bond with panelled pilasters at the corners. The three-storey carding sheds on the south side are parallel to the canal and set obliquely to main mill. Its engine house is on the north side and tower at the north-west corner is panelled with moulded string courses. It rises above parapet level where there are large lunettes below a blind arcade of round-headed arches, parapet and pyramidal roof. Its six by ten bays contain iron-framed windows. The east and west elevations have large windows with continuous central iron box columns rising through first to fourth floors. The north and south elevations have single-light windows. The interior has iron girders on Tuscan columns. Its former warehouse is a Grade II listed building, built around 1882, probably designed by Bradshaw and Gass. It is a plain two-storey brick structure with three storeys overlooking the canal.				
Pendle Mill		Bedford, SJ 669,995 53°29′28″N 2°30′00″W		Demolished	
Stanley Mill		Bedford SJ 665,997 53°29′35″N 2°30′22″W	1833		192
	Notes: Bickham & Pownall built their silk mill and master's house on Duke Street in Bedford, north of the Bridgewater Canal in 1833. Of two storeys and constructed in hand-made brick with a slate roof, the Grade II listed mill is a rare survivor of a factory that housed hand-driven looms. The silk weaving mill was later converted to cotton manufacture. In 1891, it had 1,464 looms weaving muslins and shirtings. It was owned by the Pennington Mill Company.				
Williams Street Works		Bedford, SD 664,001 53°29′49″N 2°30′29″W			

== Golborne ==
Name	Architect	Location	Built	Demolished	Served (Years)
Parkside Mills		Golborne SJ 604,976 53°28′19″N 2°35′49″W			
	Notes: Owned by the Golborne Mills Company in 1891, Parkside mills was a combined mill housing 80,000 spindles and 93 looms weaving velvets, velveteens, satteens and cords.				
Upper Mills		Golborne SJ 600,979 53°28′34″N 2°36′14″W			
	Notes: 1891- Halliday and Constantine, 200 looms				

== Haigh ==
Name	Architect	Location	Built	Demolished	Served (Years)
Haigh Works		Haigh SD 582,082 53°34′08″N 2°37′59″W			
	Notes: Haigh Works was a dye works.				

== Hindley ==
Name	Architect	Location	Built	Demolished	Served (Years)
Hindley Green Mills		Hindley Green SD 635,034 53°31′34″N 2°33′07″W			
	Notes: In 1891 the mill was operated by Thomas Kirkpatrick and Sons who owned Hindsford Mill in Tyldesley, and had 66,400 mule spindles.				
Lowe Mills		Hindley	1785	demolished	
	Notes: In 1891 the Hindley Twist Company had 89,980 mule spindles. The mill closed in 1934.				
Prospect Mill (Platt Lane Mill)	Stott and Sons	Hindley SD 618,042 53°31′59″N 2°34′41″W	1887	in use	
	Notes: Prospect Mill was a weaving mill built in 1887 to the designs of Scott and Sons In 1891, owned by the Platt Lane Manufacturing Co, it held 416 looms. Its 280hp mill engine was built by Douglas & Grant of Kirkcaldy. In 1910 the water tower was built. It is now a business centre.				
Worthington Mills		Hindley		demolished	
	Notes: In 1891 the mills were operated by Richard Pennington and contained 43,000 spindles and 645 looms. In 2016 the site was occupied by Tesco.				

== Ince ==
Name	Architect	Location	Built	Demolished	Served (Years)
Crescent Mill		Ince, SD 597,055 53°32′42″N 2°36′36″W			
Empress Mill		Ince SD 592,053 53°32′49″N 2°36′50″W		Demolished	
	Notes: The mill site is now an industrial estate.				
Rose Bridge Mill		Ince			
	Notes: In 1891 Rose Bridge Spinning Company's mill housed 14,000 spindles.				

== Orrell ==
Name	Architect	Location	Built	Demolished	Served (Years)
Sandbrook Mill		Orrell, SD 526,041 53°31′52″N 2°43′01″W	1860s		
Signal Mill		Orrell, SD 526,041 53°31′52″N 2°43′01″W	1913		112

== Pemberton ==
Name	Architect	Location	Built	Demolished	Served (Years)
Enfield Mill		Pemberton, SD 553,043 53°31′59″N 2°40′34″W			
May Mill No.1	Stott and Sons	Pemberton SD 556,036 53°31′37″N 2°40′16″W	1889	Demolished	
	Notes: May Mill No. 1, a ring spinning mill, was built in 1889. The mill had 664 ring spindles supplied by Platt Brothers of Oldham and an 800hp mill engine by Benjamin Goodfellow of Hyde.				
May Mill No.2	Stott and Sons	Pemberton SD 556,036 53°31′37″N 2°40′16″W	1900	Demolished	
	Notes: May Mill No. 2, a ring spinning mill, was built in 1900. The mill was 50 bays long. and of triple brick arch construction housing 41,000 ring spindles and a 1200hp mill engine by Ashton, Frost & Co of Blackburn. The business was bought by the Lancashire Cotton Corporation. The business was operated by Courtaulds from the 1960s until it closed in 1980.				

== Pennington ==
Name	Architect	Location	Built	Demolished	Served (Years)
Avenue Mill		Pennington SJ 656,004 53°29′56″N 2°31′05″W			
	Notes: William Guest owned Avenue Mill on Bridge Street, (now Leigh Road on the site of the Thomas Burke public house). In 1891 the mill housed 16,000 spindles.				
Etherstone Mill		Pennington SJ 670,996 53°29′38″N 2°31′41″W	1914		111
	Notes: Etherstone Mill or Lilford Weaving Mill was a single storey weaving shed was built south of the Bridgewater Canal off Etherstone Street. Construction started in 1914 and the shell of the building was used in 1915 as a camp for German prisoners, many of whom were captured in the Battle of Mons. Whilst in use as a prisoner of war camp, a prisoner was shot trying to escape. Machinery was installed in 1920 and the mill began production. In 1954 it became part of English Sewing Cotton Company. The mill specialised in industrial cloths.				
Knott's Mill		Pennington SJ 640,980 53°28′41″N 2°32′35″W	1858		72
	Notes: John Thorp built the first storey of the mill in 1858 and Joseph Knott completed it. In 1880 the company traded as John Knott and Sons. The Knotts disposed of it in 1892 when it was known as Buckleys Ltd. It became the Pennington Spinning Company and, in the great depression it was closed for many years. The mill closed in 1930, when the machinery was dismantled and the premises used for light engineering.				
Rose Mill		Pennington SJ 657,998 53°29′38″N 2°31′05″W			
	Notes: Originally a silk mill, Rose Mill on Ellesmere Street, north of the Bridgewater Canal was later owned by Leigh Friendly Co-operative Society Ltd. It was a weaving shed with 578 looms producing fine shirtings and cambrics.				
Welch Hill Mill (Welch Mill)		Pennington SJ 653,999 53°29′42″N 2°31′30″W			
	Notes: Welch Mill or Welch Hill Mill is situated west of Leigh Bridge on the Leigh branch of the Leeds and Liverpool Canal and started as a silk weaving mill. As the silk industry declined, the mill stood empty until taken over and converted to cotton weaving by Gamble and Smith (owners of Brookside Mill in Bedford) who manufactured fine cottons. It has been converted to other uses.				

== Standish ==
Name	Architect	Location	Built	Demolished	Served (Years)
Bradley Mills (Douglas Mill)		Standish SD 572,112 53°35′46″N 2°38′53″W	1906	standing	119
	Notes: In 1950 Carrington and Dewhurst occupied the premises. In 2016 the mill was used for storage.				
Standish Bleachworks		Standish SD 579,101 53°35′10″N 2°38′13″W			
	Notes: Standish Bleachworks by the River Douglas, a former paper mill, was bought by T Taylor and Co and commenced bleaching operations in 1884. It was taken over by the Bradford Dyers' Association Ltd in 1899, and dyeing was introduced but discontinued in 1907. The bleachworks used the Mayflower as its trademark. The works closed in 1998 and the site was used by small businesses. It was demolished and replaced by a housing estate in 2006. Some historic features including the engine house, electricity sub-station and a section of wall have been retained.				

== Tyldesley ==
Name	Architect	Location	Built	Demolished	Served (Years)
Barnfield Mills	Bradshaw Gass & Hope	Tyldesley SD 689,022 53°30′58″N 2°28′12″W	1896	1993	95
	Notes: Barnfield Mills was a complex of six mills on either side of Union Street H P Barton and Caleb Wright built the first Barnfield Mill with 20,000 spindles on the west side of Union Street on a field known as Barnfield in 1851. By 1866 Wright had new partners, Peter and Charles Eckersley, and they built the second mill. In 1870 Caleb Wright and Company had a third spinning mill. Three more mills were built and the company employed 800 workers. Barnfield No 6 was built on the site of Resolution Mill in 1894. After Wright's death, the company was acquired by the Fine Spinners and Doublers Association and subsequently by Courtaulds. Barnfield No 6 was built in brick with large rectangular windows and was six storeys high with a water tower with a dome at its south east corner. Its ornamental single-storey office block fronting onto Shuttle Street. When built, No 6 Mill used the latest developments, it had concrete floors and was built to house self-acting mules, though it used the engine house from the old mill which powered the machines via a rope race. Ring spinning machinery was installed in the 20th century. The last of the mills, No 6, was demolished in 1993.				
Hindsford Cotton Mill		Tyldesley SJ 686,021 53°30′54″N 2°28′22″W			
	Notes: Hindsford Cotton Mill was situated in Tyldesley by the Hindsford Brook on Little Factory Street. It was owned by Thomas Kirkpatrick and Sons who also had a mill in Hindley Green and in 1891 had 19,120 spindles.				
Hope Cotton Mill		Tyldesley SJ 686,020 53°30′51″N 2°28′28″W			
	Notes: A mill on James Street was built by Joseph Wilson in 1836. It was later acquired by Thomas Clegg who extended it and raised it by a storey. In 1853 it was known as Hope Mill. In 1883 the spinning and doubling mill, manager's house, cottages in Clegg Street, Blenheim Street, James Street, Charles Street, Cross Street, Elliott Street and Factory Street were offered at auction. Its machinery was made by Dobson & Barlow, Platt Brothers, Howarth and Cryer and included 21 pairs of self-acting mules, 20 ring and 64 flyer doubling frames. Water to fill its lodges was obtained from wells on the premises. Seven years later, building materials and machinery for part of the mill were offered at auction. The machinery included a horizontal high-pressure steam engine with a 28-inch cylinder by J & E Wood of Bolton, a low-pressure beam engine with a 43-inch cylinder, electrical apparatus by Siemens Brothers of London and shafting by Mather & Platt. The spinning mill with 40,000 spindles was owned by Robert J. Clegg in 1891.				
Parr Bridge Mill		Mosley Common SJ 714,016 53°30′38″N 2°25′56″W	1859		166
	Notes: Parr Bridge Mill, a weaving shed by the Honksford Brook in Mosley Common was built in 1859. It had several owners; Richard Farnworth in 1865 and John Jackson in 1869. Jones & Company who had a warehouse in Fountain Street Manchester owned it in 1872 and William Porritt in 1876. In 1879 Samuel Middleton had 150 looms there and an office in New Brown Street Manchester. Subsequent owners were the Forsyth Brothers and, after being disused for some time, in 1920 it was acquired by Robert Farnworth of Bolton. In its later years it made rayon fabric.				
Resolution Mill		Tyldesley SD 689,022 53°30′58″N 2°28′12″W	1823	Demolished	68
	Notes: Thomas Kearsley built Resolution Mill in 1823 at a cost of £5,000 and added to it by 1826 so that the mills took the shape of a letter L. It was located east of Union Street between Shuttle Street and Ellesmere Street. In 1838 Resolution Mills were the highest rated and most important in the town. By 1853 the mills were in the control of James Bayley and James Knott and Caleb Wright acquired them in the 1880s. They were destroyed by fire on 26 September 1891.				
Tyldesley Mill or New Mill		Tyldesley SJ 687,021 53°30′54″N 2°28′22″W			
	Notes: Tyldesley Mill or Tyldesley New Mill was an early cotton spinning mill built for John Jones and Richard Jenning Jones on Castle Street and Factory Street. James Burton was a partner in 1838 and took charge when the Jones brothers left to open a silk mill in Bedford. Caleb Wright worked at the mill before starting his own venture. The site was used for the Majestic Cinema and after that Tyldesley Pool.				

== Westleigh ==
Name	Architect	Location	Built	Demolished	Served (Years)
Firs Mills		Westleigh SD 642,005 53°30′00″N 2°32′28″W		Demolished	
	Notes: Firs Mills were built by Tunnicliffe and Hampson. In 1891 they had 105,000 spindles. The last mill was built in 1902, it was of four storeys with a water tower with four clock faces.				
Kirkhall Lane Mills		Westleigh SD 652,009 53°30′22″N 2°31′08″W			
	Notes: William Hayes, brother of John and James, was a partner with Henry Isherwood in Kirkhall Lane Mills. After Hayes' death in 1869, his son, Thomas Travers Hayes, succeeded him and became sole owner in 1874. In 1849 the mill was known as Westleigh New Mill. Its steam engine was started up on Good Friday 1836 and the mill ran full-time through the cotton famine. The mill had 44,748 spindles in 1891. The mills were renamed Carrington Mills.				
Victoria Mills (Hayes Mills)		Westleigh SD 657,012 53°30′14″N 2°31′30″W		Demolished	
	Notes: James and John Hayes built the first of the Victoria Mills off Kirkhall Lane in 1856. A second mill built soon after was ravaged by fire in 1864 and rebuilt in 1887. The fourth mill was dated 1878. The Hayes brothers were the first firm in Leigh to use long-stapled Egyptian cotton. In 1947 J. & J. Hayes amalgamated with Greenhalgh & Shaw of Bolton using the name Hayeshaw Ltd. In 1891 the mills belonging to J. & J. Hayes housed 216,518 spindles. The oldest mill was of 24 bays long and four storeys high, it had rectangular windows with stone lintels and an internal engine house.				

== Wigan ==
Name	Architect	Location	Built	Demolished	Served (Years)
Actons Mill		Wigan, SD 584,051 53°32′28″N 2°37′44″W			
Britannia Mill		Wigan SD 576,053 53°32′35″N 2°38′28″W			
	Notes: The mill on Wallgate was operated by W. and R. F. Hopwood in 1891 and contained 6,740 spindles.				
Gidlow Mill (Pagefield Mill)	George Woodhouse	Wigan SD 579,065 53°33′11″N 2°38′13″W	1865		160
	Notes: Gidlow Mill, to the north of Mesnes Park, was built in 1865 to designs by George Woodhouse for John Rylands and was once the centre of his extensive business. It replaced an earlier mill. The complex, which includes the spinning mill, weaving sheds engine house and chimney is a Grade II listed building. The mill is constructed in red brick with details in blue and white brick which was unusual for its date. Its roof has multiple ridges covered in Welsh slate. Its floors were supported on cast iron columns. The mill was of fireproof construction. Cotton was received into the upper levels of the spinning mill and progressed downwards in contrast to other mills. There are proposals to convert the building for residential use. It had two 460HP twin cylinder J. Musgrave engines with 40in cylinders and a 6ft stroke running at 42rpm on steam at 80psi. The 19ft flywheel drove geared drives. It was converted by Sharples to a 140 psi triple expansion engine in 1900 possibly when the mules were replaced by ring frames.				
Pennyhurst Mill		Wigan, SD 576,053 53°32′35″N 2°38′28″W			
Princess Street Mill		Wigan, SD 582,051 53°32′28″N 2°37′55″W			
Swan Meadow mills		Wigan SD 577,050 53°32′24″N 2°38′24″W			
	Notes: Swan Meadow Mill was built by James Eckersley in 1827 and became an Old Mill when a new, larger mill was built in 1838. It was demolished in 1960 followed in 1963 by the larger mill. James Eckersley and Sons had three four-storey mills by 1880. Musgraves of Bolton supplied a tandem compound steam engine in 1884. Eckersleys ran six spinning mills and two weaving sheds in the town, Swan Meadow Old, Swan Meadow large, Water Heyes, and Western Mills No.1, No.2 and No.3. The mills housed a total of 236,572 ring spindles, 14,554 mule spindles and 1687 looms.				
Trencherfield Mill	Potts, Son and Hennings	Wigan SD 578,051 53°32′28″N 2°38′17″W			
	Notes: Trencherfield Mill on Wallgate was a cotton spinning mill built in 1907-8 to designs by Potts, Son and Hennings in an Edwardian Baroque style. The four-storey mill has an iron and steel frame clad in red brick with buff coloured terracotta details. The main range has 15 bays demarcated by brick pilasters each with two windows up to the third floor and three-light windows with mullions on the fourth. The top floor has a sillband decorated with terracotta. Its original 4-cylinder triple-expansion tandem steam engine by J & E Wood of Bolton remains in situ in working order. The mill has been altered and converted to workshops, warehouses, apartments, offices and a museum. In 1891 William Woods and Son operated the mill which housed 48,000 spindles and 420 looms.				
Victoria Mills (Taylor's Mill)	William Fairbairn	Wigan SD 576,053 53°32′35″N 2°38′28″W	1840		185
	Notes: Victoria Mill was built around 1840 by William Fairbairn. In 1891 it was occupied by Thomas Taylor and Brother with 171,224 spindles and 1,605 looms. Only a part remains.				
Western Mills Nos.1, 2 & 3 (known as Eckersley Mills	Stott and Sons	Wigan SD 576,050 53°32′24″N 2°38′28″W	1883	Standing	142
	Notes: Western Mills is a group of mills close to Wigan Pier, all designed by A H Stott for ffarington Eckersley and in deteriorating condition. Western No 1 is an integrated mill with a spinning block with integral engine house, chimney, reeling and winding rooms, weaving shed and warehouse. It is dated 1884 on the parapet above the entrance bay. The spinning block is built in red brick with a plinth of blue engineering brick and sandstone dressings. It is a Grade II listed building. Possibly already demolished. Western No 2, dated 1888 is an integrated mill comprising a spinning block with boiler house, engine house and chimney, winding and beaming rooms. Its weaving shed has been demolished. The four-storey spinning block is built of common brick with sandstone dressings and has a concealed roof. Its two-storey winding and beaming rooms have a deep basement. Its chimney has a plinth of blue engineering brick and tapered octagonal shaft. It is a Grade II listed building. Western No 3 Mill, dated 1900, is a spinning mill with a boiler house, chimney and engine house, and a beaming and reeling block. The mill is used as a warehouse. The four-storey mill is built of common brick with sandstone dressings and has a concealed roof. It has a square tower rising above the parapet. Altogether Eckersley's mills housed 236,572 ring spindles, 14,554 mule spindles and 1687 looms.				
Wharfe Mill		Wigan, SD 582,051 53°32′28″N 2°37′55″W			
Whittaker's Mill		Wigan, SD 579,065 53°33′11″N 2°38′13″W			
Wood Street Mill		Wigan, SD 584,051 53°32′28″N 2°37′44″W			

== See also ==
- List of mills owned by the Lancashire Cotton Corporation Limited
- Fine Spinners and Doublers
