= Leigh Hackspace =

Hackerspace in Greater Manchester, England

- Formation: 23 January 2015
- Purpose: Makerspace
- Location: Leigh, Greater Manchester, England
- Website: www.leighhack.org

Leigh Hackspace is a non-profit makerspace located in Leigh, Greater Manchester, England. It was founded as a UK community interest company in 2015 by a group of local enthusiasts keen to develop the town's digital and creative facilities, and it has since grown into one of the North West's most active and largest hackspaces, at over 4,000 square feet (370 m^{2}).

== History ==
The first meetings of Leigh Hackspace took place in late 2014 at Cadence Cafe in Tyldesley, Greater Manchester, following the creation of a Facebook Group 'Leigh Virtual Hackspace'. After two such 'hacking' meetings, the founders were offered the temporary share of a derelict shop at 25 Market Street, Leigh, by the Leigh Building Preservation Trust. The joint official opening was held on 13 February 2015, and the organisation's Facebook Group was able to be renamed, removing the word 'Virtual'. Over the course of 2015, Leigh Hackspace expanded its activities and took over the use of the entire shop.

In 2016 the hackspace moved to larger premises at The Cotton Mill, Mather Lane, Leigh.

During 2019, the hackspace moved location to Leigh Spinners, operated by the Leigh Building Preservation Trust. The hackspace now consists of three separate units within the mill, with dedicated workshop and craft areas.

== Activities ==
Leigh Hackspace was previously the only makerspace in the UK which is also an NHS England Code4Health Community. The hackspace is active within the Leigh voluntary community and has run a variety of themed maker days and Hack Days, including Wigan Council 'Deal in Action' Hackathon, the Young Rewired State Festival of Code, and GM HackFest 2016.

There are active partnerships between Leigh Hackspace and other local non-profit and community groups including True Colours CIC, The Blair Project, and Higher Folds Community Centre. Leigh Hackspace is also a member of the official Code Club and CodeUp! Manchester groups, and contains the only public darkroom in Leigh's vicinity.
