= Barnfield Mills =

Coordinates: 53.516°N 2.470°W

Barnfield Mills was a complex of cotton mills that operated in Tyldesley, Greater Manchester, England from the middle of the 19th century.

== History ==
Barnfield Mills was a complex of six cotton spinning mills on either side of Union Street in Tyldesley. H P Barton and Caleb Wright built the first mill on the west side of Union Street on a field known as Barnfield in 1851. The mill had 20,000 spindles. By 1866 Wright had new partners, Peter and Charles Eckersley, and the partnership built the second mill. By 1870 Caleb Wright and Company had built a third spinning mill and three more mills were built. At its peak the company employed 800 workers.

Barnfield No 6, locally referred to as Caleb Wright's, between Shuttle Street and Ellesmere Street, was built on the site of Resolution Mills which Wright acquired in the 1880s and which were destroyed by fire on 26 September 1891. In 1894 after Wright's death, the company was acquired by the Fine Spinners and Doublers Association and subsequently by Courtaulds. Fred Dibnah demolished one of the mill chimneys in 1970. The last of the mills, No 6, was demolished in 1993.

== Architecture ==
Barnfield No 6 Mill, designed by Bradshaw Gass & Hope was constructed in 1894. The brick-built mill was internally approximately 65 metres wide by 40 metres deep. It had ten bays with a large rectangular window in each bay. It was six storeys high with a water tower topped with a copper dome at its south west corner. The tower contained a tank for the mill's sprinkler system. Its roof had multiple ridges corresponding to the bays and was covered with slates. When built, No 6 Mill was at the leading edge of mill design, its concrete floors were supported by steel beams and the supporting cast iron columns were encased in concrete. The mill had a dust flue in the form of an Italianate tower incorporated in the rope race.

The mill was built to house self-acting mules, and originally used the engine house from the old mill which powered the machinery via a rope race. A second engine house was built on the north side. Ring spinning machinery was installed in the 20th century.

The mill had an ornamental single-storey office block fronting onto Shuttle Street.

== See also ==
- List of mills in Wigan
