= Leigh Spinners =

Mill in Leigh, Greater Manchester, England

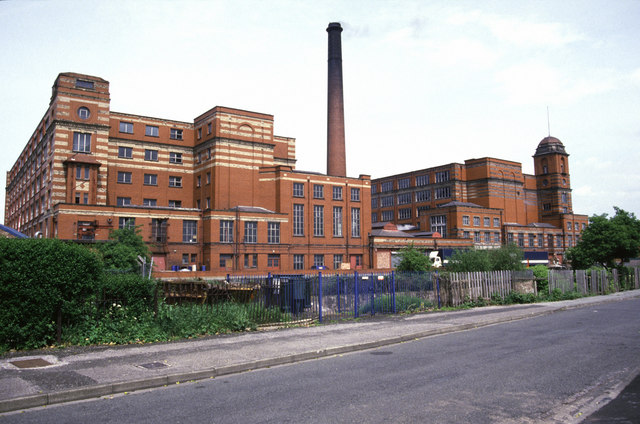
- Leigh Spinners Mill

General information
- Location: Leigh, Greater Manchester, England
- Coordinates: 53.493°N 2.493°W
- Year built: 1913, 1923

Technical details
- Material: Brick
- Floor count: 6

Design and construction
- Architecture firm: Bradshaw, Gass & Hope
- Designations

Listed Building – Grade II*
- Official name: Leigh Mill
- Designated: 25 April 1990
- Reference no.: 1253119

Website
- leighspinnersmill.com

Leigh Spinners or Leigh Mill is a Grade II* listed former cotton mill in Leigh, Greater Manchester, England. After being disused for many years, one of the mill buildings has been redeveloped into a community hub with 80 independent businesses and a Heritage Centre.

The mill is currently operated by the Leigh Building Preservation Trust.

== History ==
A product of the last generation of cotton mill building, Leigh Spinners was designed by Bolton architects Bradshaw, Gass & Hope for the Horrocks Company, and built in two phases. The east section comprising the six-storey mill, boiler house and chimney stack was built in 1913 and the matching west section was completed ten years later. One of the few double mills to be completed, it is one of the most complete still standing in Greater Manchester. Part of the factory is occupied by Leigh Spinners Ltd who have manufactured carpets since 1969 and since 2012, synthetic turf products for landscaping and sport.

The building is in poor condition and considered to be at risk by Historic England. A charity, the Leigh Building Preservation Trust was formed to restore the steam engine and engine house. In September 2013, the charity was awarded a £75,000 grant to restore the steam engine and repair the engine house by Waste Recycling Environmental Limited, a heritage fund that protects buildings of historical importance. The charity was able to turn the engine in 2018 for the first time in many years.

As at January 2019, the younger of the two mill buildings has had extensive roof repairs, allowing the charity to advance the restoration of several floors. Sport England funding enabled the conversion of one floor to accommodate a table tennis club, martial arts, cheerleading, archery and a gym, with a café and other facilities. Further floors are now in development, with music studios and arts spaces already being established.

In October 2020, Leigh Building Preservation Trust appointed former MP Jo Platt, as the General Manager for the project, in order to develop existing services and introduce new ideas.

Twelve months later, the building was one of 142 sites across England to receive part of a £35-million injection into the government's Culture Recovery Fund.

== Structure ==
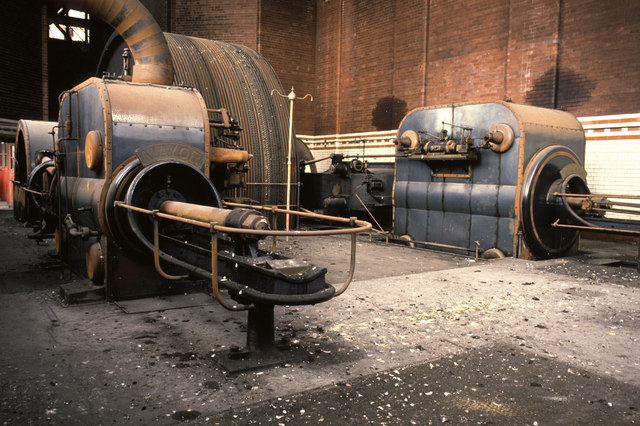
Leigh Spinners cross compound steam engine

The mill has a reinforced steel frame clad in red brick with buff-coloured brick bands and dressings. The six-storey blocks are ten bays long and seven wide and have corner water towers. The water tower to the older 1913 block rises two stages above roof level and is topped with a cupola. Both blocks have offices, an engine house and rope race towers. The mill has a single chimney and the 1923 engine house contains a cross compound mill engine made by Yates and Thom of Blackburn and once contained seven Lancashire boilers. The mill ran more than 200,000 mule and 4,800 ring spindles and its spinning machinery was supplied by Platt Brothers of Oldham.

== Current tenants ==
After the redevelopment and restoration of mill building two, over 80 businesses and community groups currently operate out of the building, including:

- Leigh Film Factory – An independent cinema run by volunteers from Leigh Film Society
- Leigh Hackspace – A community-focused hackerspace
- Northwest Computer Museum – A museum showcasing the history of computing from the 1970s onwards
- A Heritage Centre based on floor 1 and run by a group of volunteers

== See also ==
- List of mills in Wigan
- Listed buildings in Leigh, Greater Manchester
