= May Mill, Pemberton =

Cotton mill in Greater Manchester, England

- May mill, before 1951

- Location within Greater Manchester

Spinning (ring mill)
- Location: Pemberton, Wigan, Greater Manchester, England
- Owner: May Mill Spinning Co
- Further ownership: Lancashire Cotton Corporation (1930s); Courtaulds (1964)
- Coordinates: 53.5275°N 2.6713°W

Construction
- Completed: 1889

Equipment
- Date: 1905–1950
- Manufacturer: Howard & Bullough, Platt Brothers, Geo. Hattersley

May No. 1
Construction
- Completed: 1898
- Demolished: 1980

Power
- Date: 1892
- Engine maker: B Goodfellow
- Engine type: cross compound engine
- Valve Gear: Corliss valves
- Cylinder diameter and throw: 22"HP, 42"LP X 5ft stroke.
- rpm: 62rpm
- Installed horse power (ihp): 800hp
- Flywheel diameter: 20ft
- Transmission type: rope
- No. of ropes: 24

Boiler configuration
- Pressure: 180psi

Equipment
- Ring Frames path: 77,964 spindles (1946)

May No. 2
Power
- Date: 1901
- Engine maker: Ashton Frost
- Engine type: cross compound engine
- Valve Gear: Corliss valves
- Cylinder diameter and throw: 23 ½"HP, 50"LP X 5ft stroke
- rpm: 62rpm
- Installed horse power (ihp): 1500hp
- Flywheel diameter: 28ft
- Transmission type: ropes
- No. of ropes: 34

Boiler configuration
- Pressure: 180psi

May Mill was a cotton spinning mill in Pemberton, Wigan, Greater Manchester, England. Historically in Lancashire, it was built in 1889. It was taken over by the Lancashire Cotton Corporation in the 1930s and passed to Courtaulds in 1962–63 to produce carpet fibre, which it continued to do until its closure on 17 October 1980.

== History ==
Pemberton's history was built on coal and cotton. The first May Mill was built in 1889 on the site of Wilde's Mill, a woollen mill built in 1850 and destroyed by fire on 13 June 1859. A second mill, known as Roper's Mill was built and also burnt down after a fire started in the engine house. In January 1889 the May Mill Spinning Company limited was formed to build a new fireproof mill to replace the one destroyed. The cornerstone was laid on 25 March 1889 and the engines, named Louisa and Helen, were dedicated in May 1890.

The industry peaked in 1912 when it produced 8 billion yards of cloth. The Great War of 1914–18 halted the supply of raw cotton, and the British government encouraged its colonies to build mills to spin and weave cotton. The war over, Lancashire never regained its markets. The independent mills were struggling. The Bank of England set up the Lancashire Cotton Corporation in 1929 to attempt to rationalise and save the industry. May Mill, Pemberton was one of 104 mills bought by the LCC, and one of the 53 mills that survived through to 1950. The mill was closed by Courtaulds in 1980.

== Architecture ==
=== Power ===
May No 1 was driven by 800 hp cross compound engine by B Goodfellow, 1892. It had a 20-foot flywheel, 24 ropes operating at 62 rpm. The boilers were 30-foot by 8-foot high-pressure Lancashire boilers. The mill was lit by electricity generated by a Parson's dynamo.

May No 2 was driven by a 1500 hp cross compound engine by Ashton Frost, 1901. This had a 28-foot flywheel, 34 ropes operating at 62 rpm.

=== Equipment ===
In 1946 May Mill had 77,964 ring spindles, but by 1948 this had fallen to 72,984. It was re-equipped around 1950. Between 1960 and 1962 the mill was converted to electric ring spinning frames. The mill was eventually taken over by Courtaulds in 1962–63 to produce carpet fibre, which it continued to do until its closure on 17 October 1980.

At the invitation of the assistant manager, Bill Crank, the Winstanleys, authors of the book cited below, visited May Mill in September 1980. They said:

Although we expected to see some old spinning machines, we were very surprised to find so many still in use; in fact, there was very little new machinery. Many of the machines were pre-1920, and some dated to about the turn of the century. Slubber and drawing frames were said to be part of the original May Mill equipment These were made in 1902 by Howard & Bullough of Accrington. Numerous carding frames by Platt Brothers of Oldham were dated 1905, 1907 and 1920, but some of these had been converted to suit Courtauld's needs. Fly frames, also made by Howard & Bullough, were dated 1915. The scutchers made by Platt Brothers, were built in 1921 and 1924. Cone winders by Geo. Hattersley were made about 1950. Perhaps the most modern machines were ring spinning frames, dated 1967.

== Owners ==
- Lancashire Cotton Corporation (1930s–1964)
- Courtaulds (1964–1980)

== See also ==
- Textile manufacturing

== Bibliography ==
- Dunkerley, Philip (2009), Dunkerley-Tuson Family Website, The Regent Cotton Mill, Failsworth, archived from the original on 23 March 2008
- LCC (1951), The mills and organisation of the Lancashire Cotton Corporation Limited, Lancashire Cotton Corporation Limited
- Roberts, A. S. (1921), "Arthur Robert's Engine List", Arthur Roberts Black Book, One guy from Barlick-Book Transcription, archived from the original on 23 July 2011
- Winstanley, Ray; Winstanley, Derek (1981), Founded on Coal: A parish history (PDF), R. Winstanley
