= Hattersley loom =

Type of loom

The Hattersley loom was developed by George Hattersley and Sons of Keighley, West Yorkshire, England. The company had been started by Richard Hattersley after 1784, with his son, George Hattersley, later entering the business alongside him. The company developed a number of innovative looms, of which the Hattersley Standard Loom – developed in 1921 – was a great success.

== Hattersley Standard Loom ==
The Hattersley Standard Loom was designed and built in 1921. Thousands of models were expected to be sold, which would bring considerable financial success to the company.[1] After the recapitalisation boom of 1919, cotton yarn production peaked in 1926 and further investment was sparse. Rayon, an artificial silk, was invented in the 1930s in nearby Silsden, and the Hattersley Silk Loom was adapted to weave this new fabric.

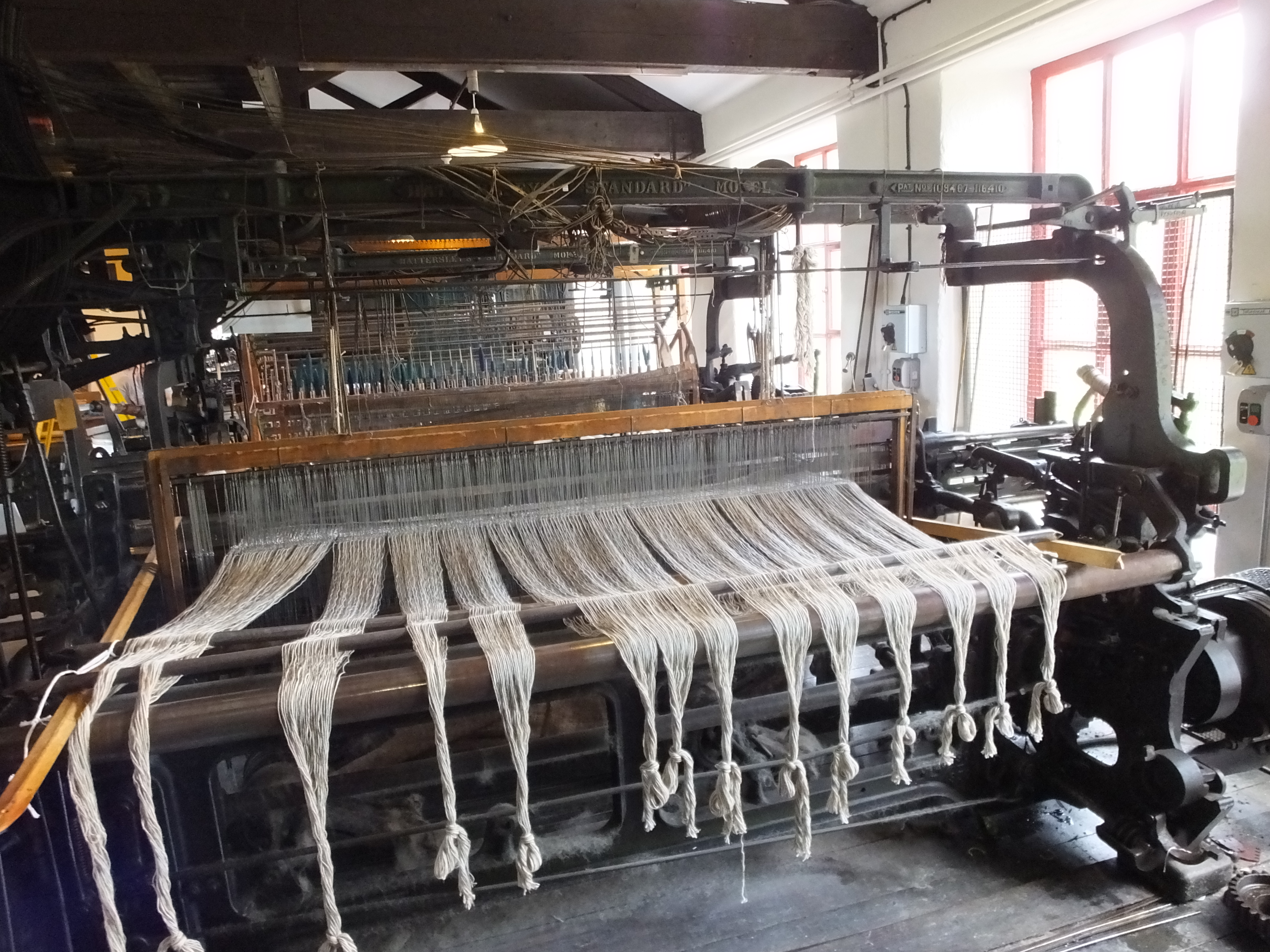
rear view

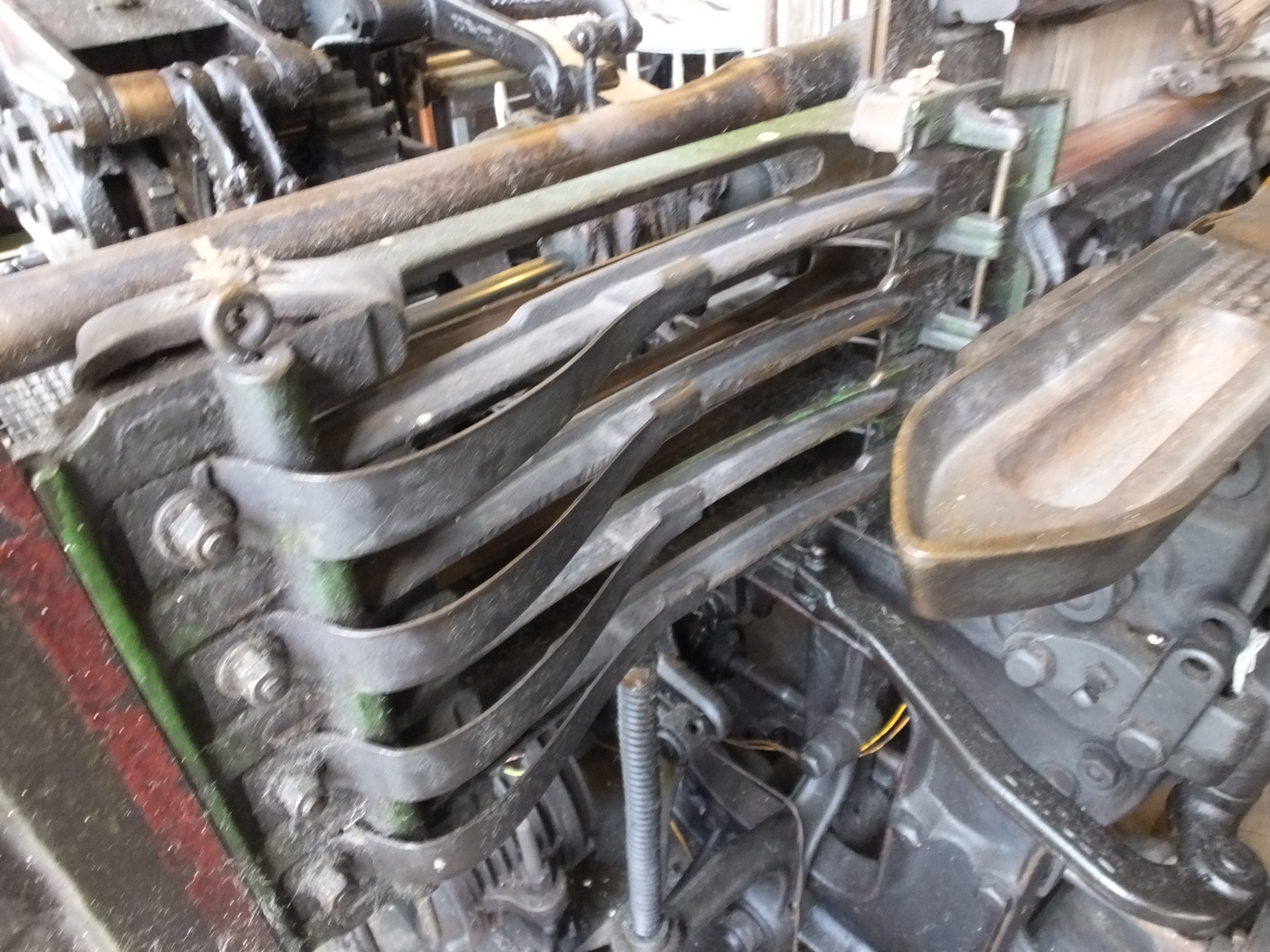
left drop box

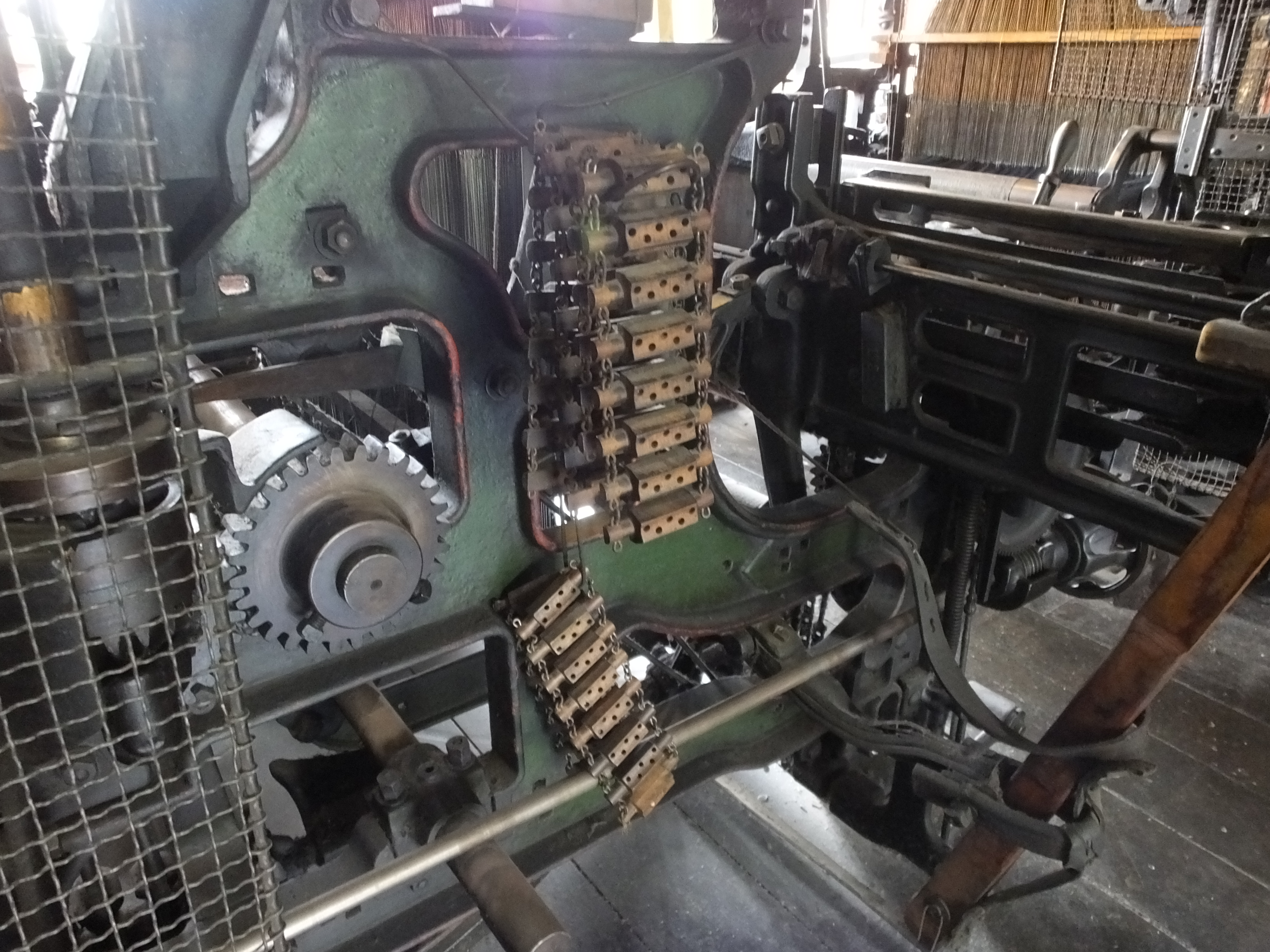
different drop box control chains

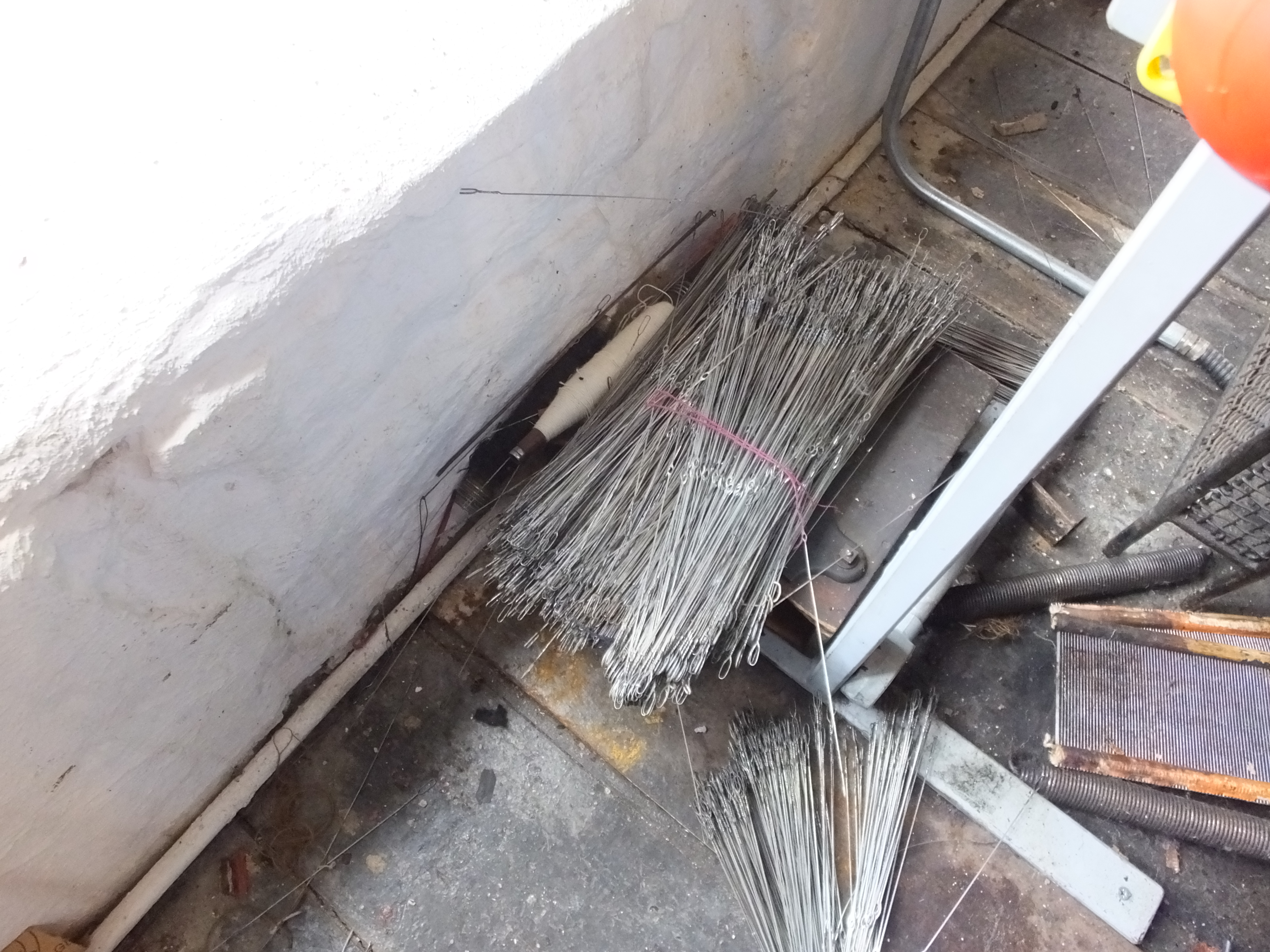
right drop box

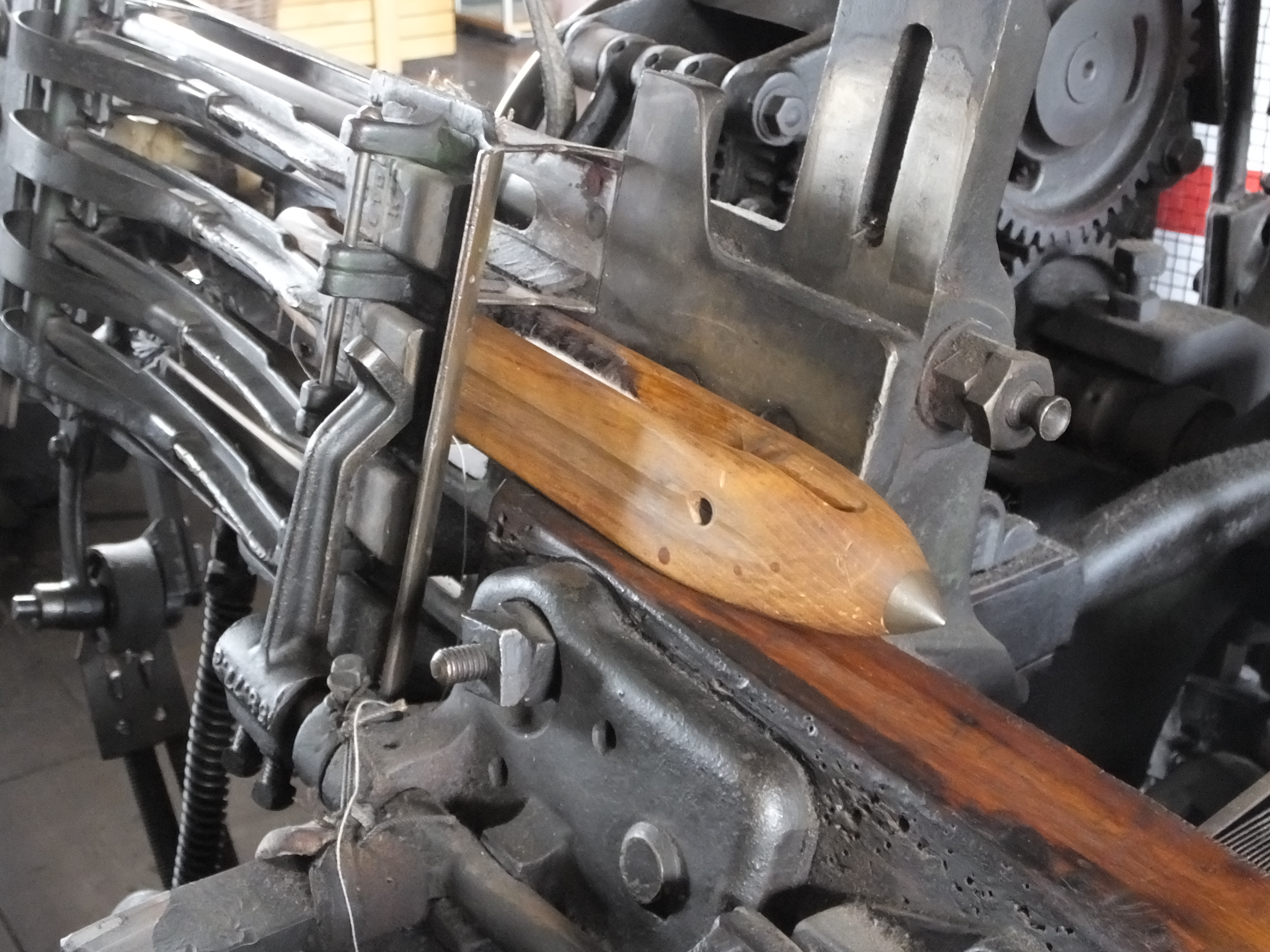
left drop box with shuttle

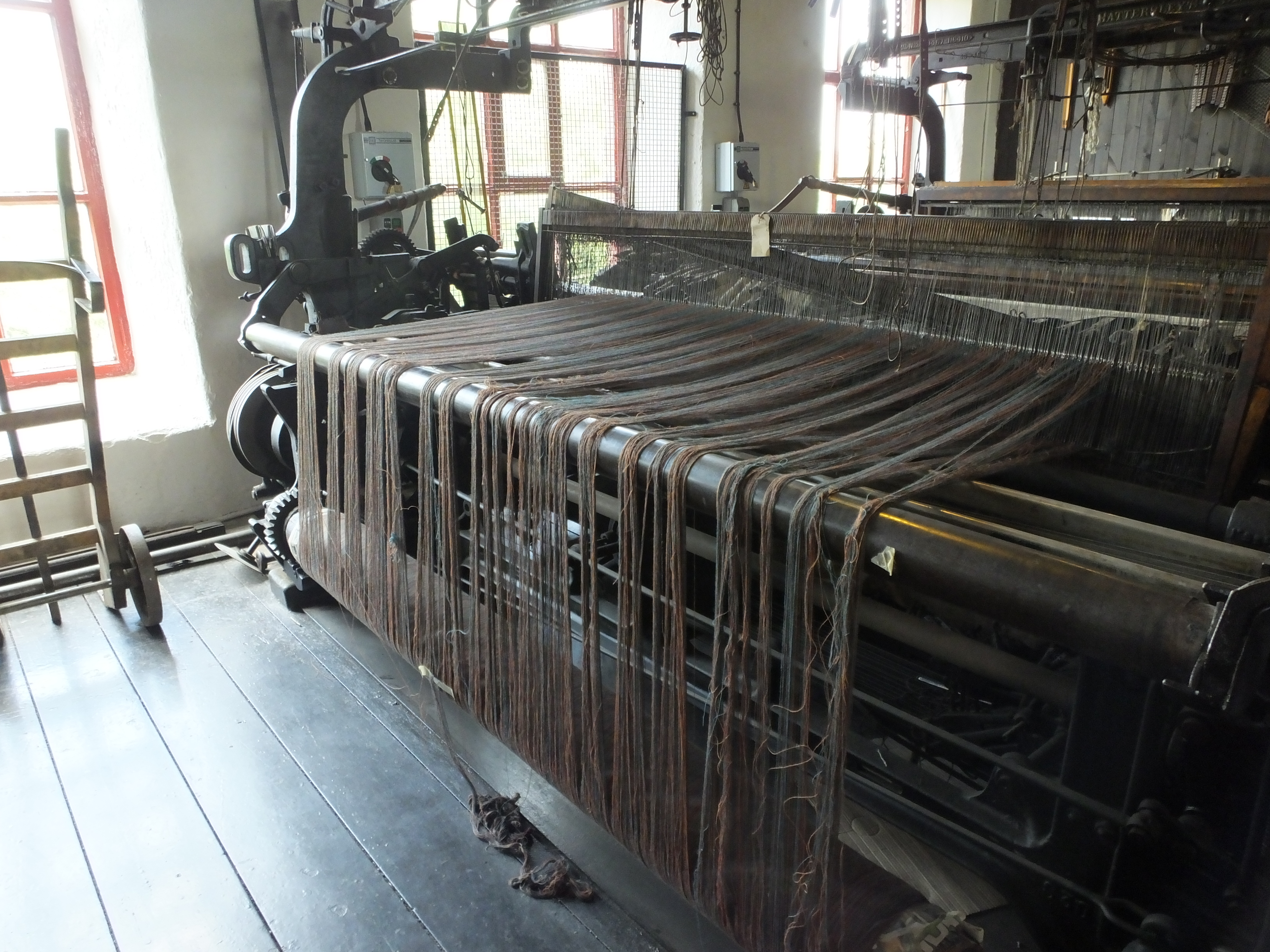
another rear view

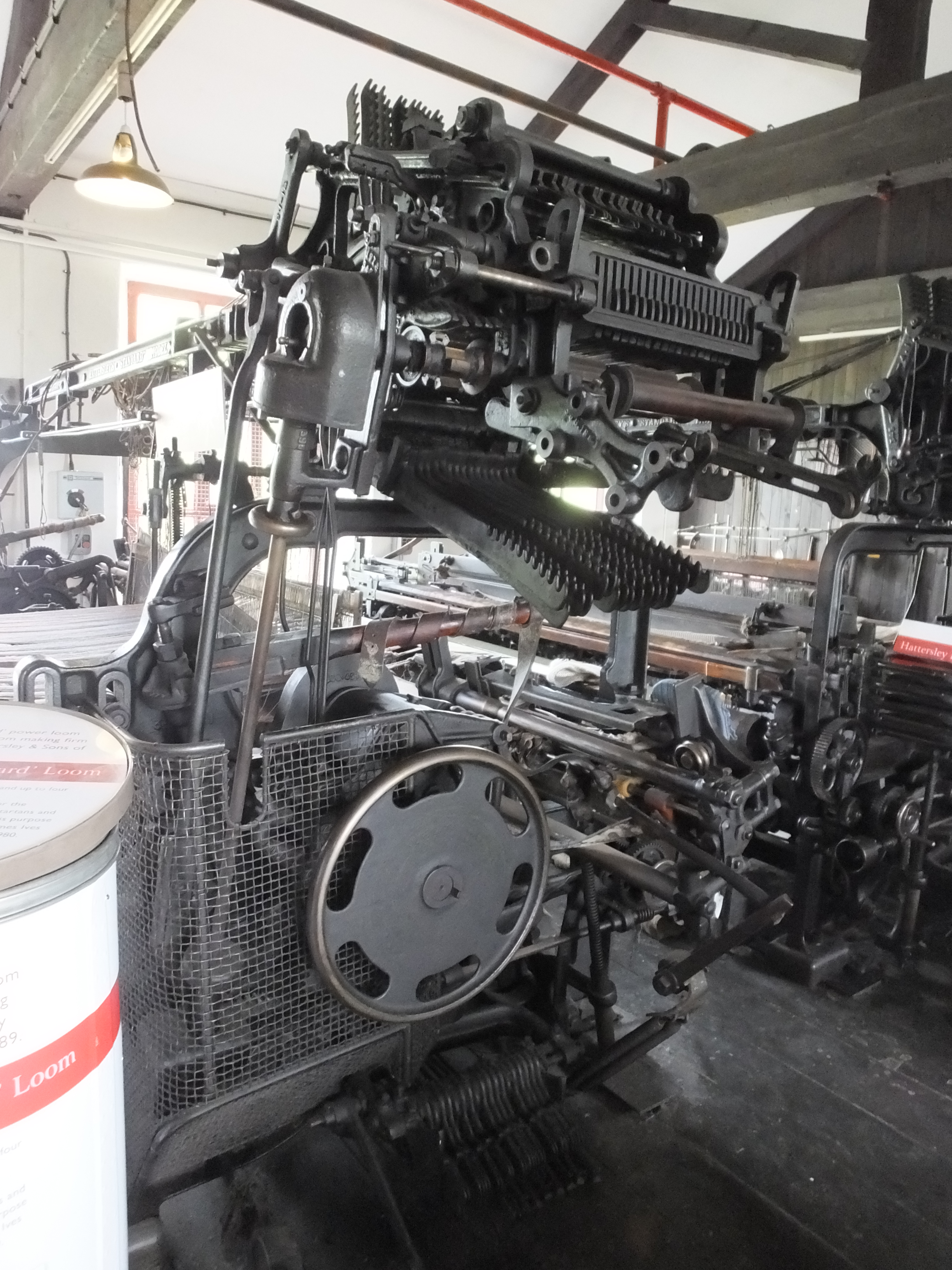
shaft dobby mechanism

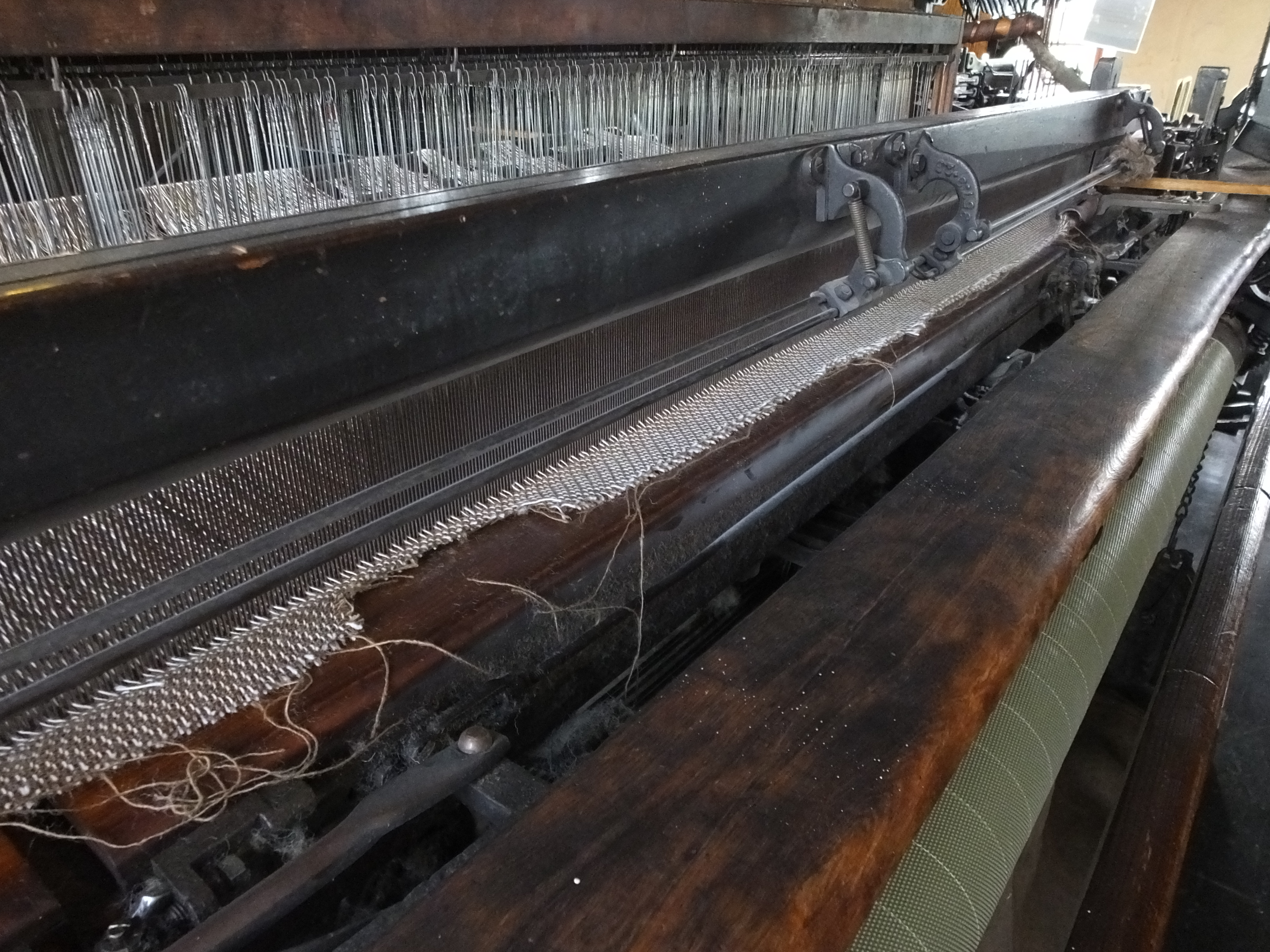
front view with reed

== Hattersley Domestic Loom ==
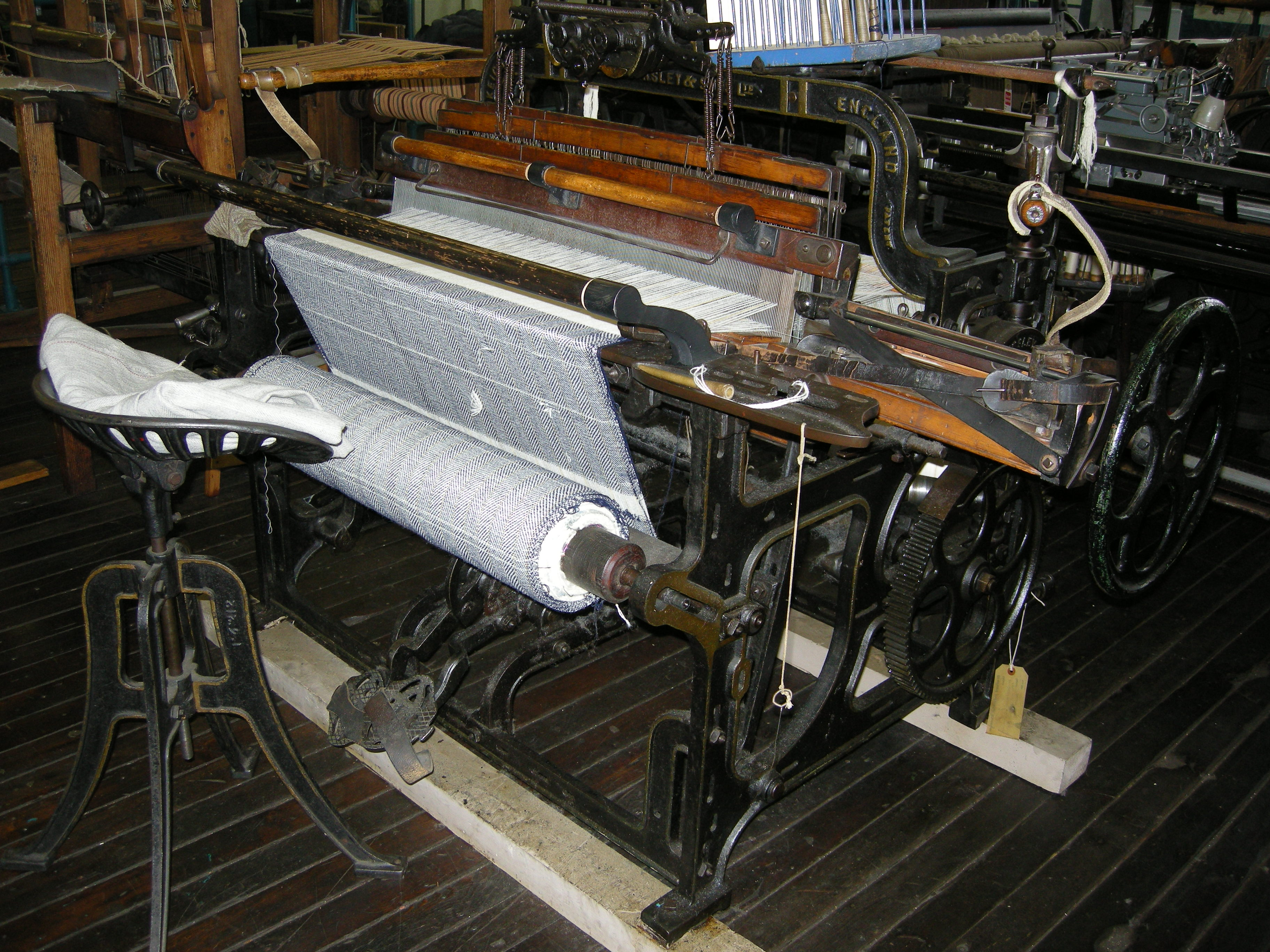
Hattersley domestic loom

The plain Hattersley Domestic Loom was specially developed for cottage or home use and designed to replace the wooden handloom; the Domestic is similar in construction to a power loom. It was introduced ca.1900 and the makers claimed that a speed of 160 picks per minute could be easily attained with from 2 to 8 shafts weaving a variety of fabrics. Because foot pedals, or treadles, operate the loom it is still classed as a handloom, but it is much easier and faster to weave as all the motions of the loom are connected via crankshaft and gear wheels. The cast metal chair, manufactured along with the loom, can be raised or lowered to suit, and the seat rocks forward and back as the weaver treadles the loom. There is an example in the Bradford Industrial Museum.

There are only two known examples of the Hattersley Domestic Weaving System in operation today - by South African homeware textile producers, Mungo, whose domestic Hattersley Loom can be found in use at the Mungo Mill, weaving runs of natural fibre textiles. Hattersley Domestic Weaving can also be found in New Zealand, in use by Roderick McLean of McLean and Company in Oamaru.

== Jacquard Tapestry Loom ==
Artworks could be replicated en masse by use of the Hattersley Jacquard (Tapestry) Loom. For example, Sir Edwin Henry Landseer's painting Bolton Abbey in Ye Olden Times was produced in tapestry form by a Jacquard Loom at a Franco-British exhibition in 1908. There is a Hattersley Jacquard (tapestry) loom located at Queen Street Mill in Burnley.

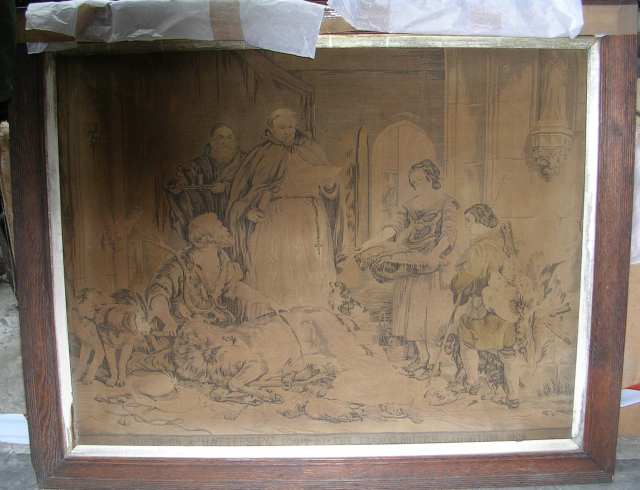
An example of a woven reproduction of Bolton Abbey in Ye Olden Times, at Queen Street Mill Museum. The original bright colours have faded.

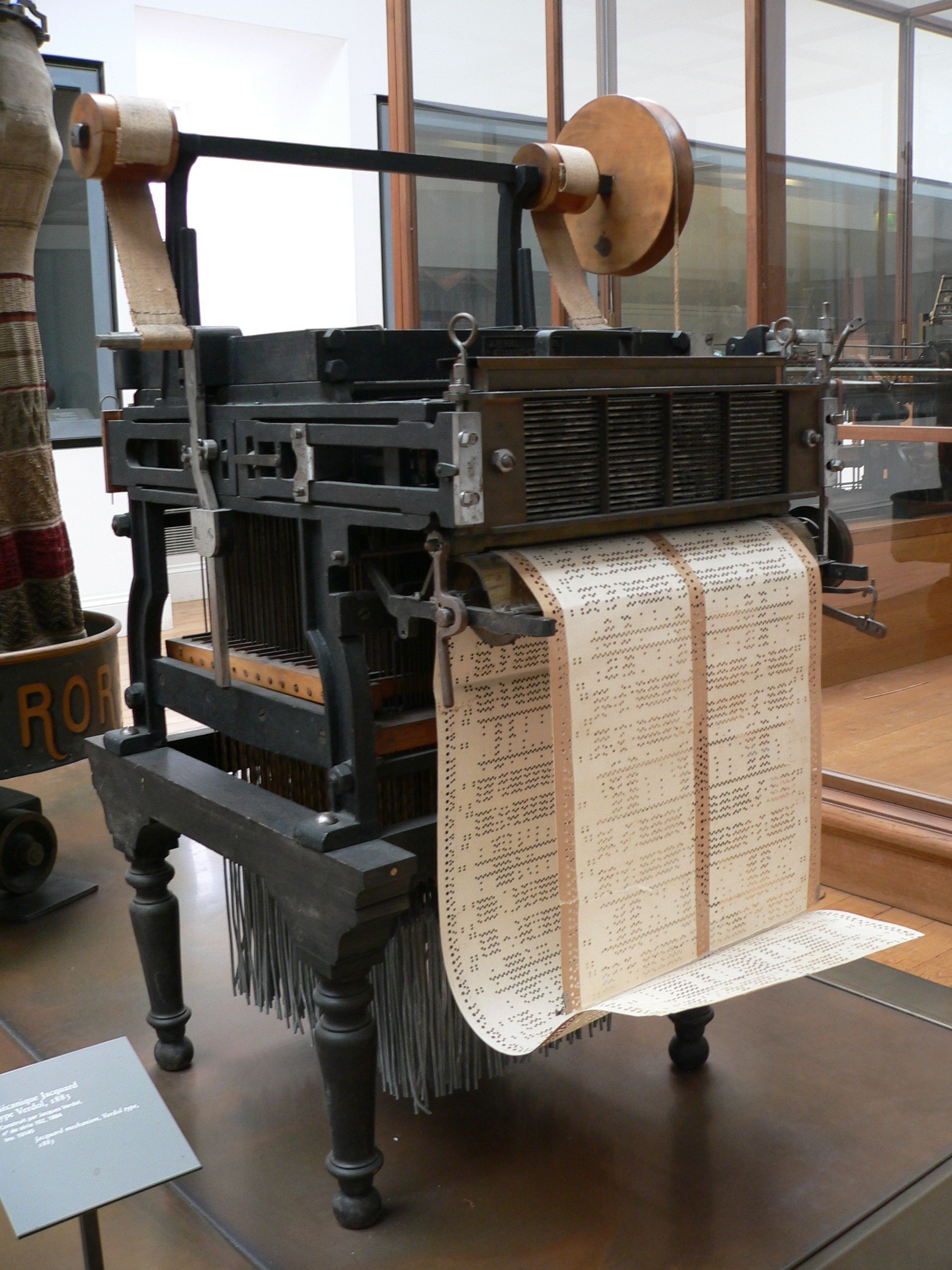
Jacquard head with Verdol endless paper card.
