= Mather Lane Mill =

Coordinates: 53.493°N 2.509°W

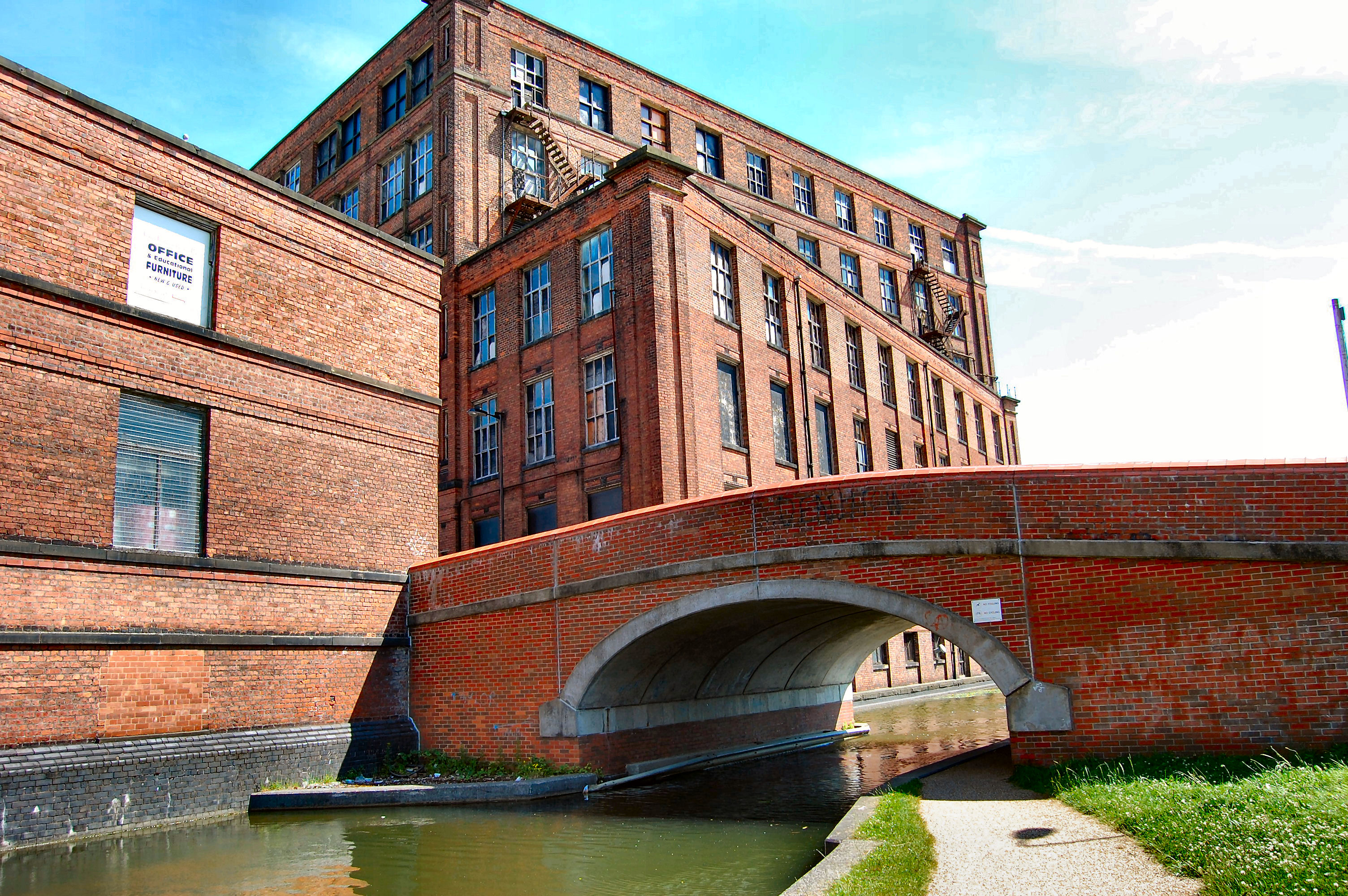
Mather Lane No 2 Mill beside the Bridgewater Canal. The warehouse is shown to the left.

Mather Lane Mills was a complex of cotton mills built by the Bridgewater Canal in Bedford, Leigh in Lancashire, England. The No 2 mill and its former warehouse are grade II listed buildings.

== History ==
The Mather Lane Company was formed at a meeting in the Black Horse public house in Leigh. Thomas Smith, a self-educated man was voted to the chair and Richard Thomas Marsh became its managing director from its inception until 1920. The first mill's working capital was £60,000 when it became operational in 1878. A second mill opened in 1883 and the third in 1891. In the 1920s, the company was merged into Combined Egyptian Mills Ltd.

== Architecture ==
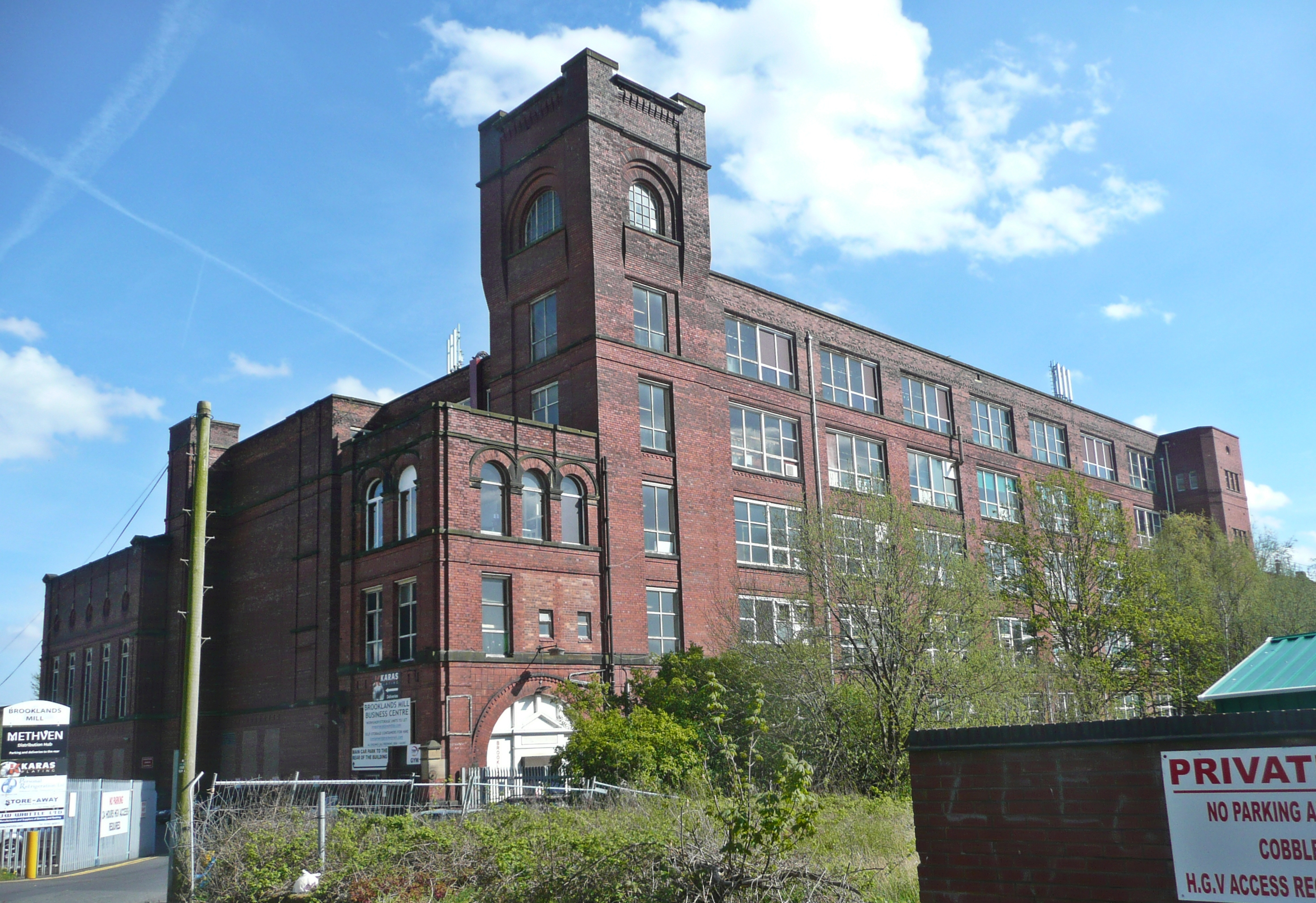
Mather Lane Mill No 3 Brooklands Mill

The second Mather Lane Mill is a Grade II listed cotton spinning mill on the north bank of the Bridgewater Canal. It was built in 1882 to the designs of Bradshaw and Gass of Bolton and is notable for its severe classical elevations. It is an important early factory design by the architects and has features unusual for its date including a square plan, flat roof and its partly internal engine house. The mill has six storeys and a basement built in brick in English garden wall bond with panelled pilasters at the corners. Three-storey carding sheds on the south side are parallel to the canal and set obliquely to main mill. Its engine house is on the north side and its tower at the north-west corner is panelled with moulded string courses. The tower rises above parapet level where there are large lunettes below a blind arcade of round-headed arches, parapet and it has a pyramidal roof.

The mill's six by ten bays contain iron-framed windows. The east and west elevations have large windows with continuous central iron box columns rising through the first to fourth floors. The north and south elevations have single-light windows. Inside the ceilings are supported by iron girders on Tuscan columns.

Mill No 2, was redeveloped in the early 2020s by JP McGuire Developments in 98 one, two and three bedroom apartments called Loom Wharf. It forms a modern residential complex, utilising the former cotton stores in the basement as car parking, seven levels of luxury apartments and state of the art gym facilities.

Mill No 3, also known as Brooklands Mill, was constructed on the opposite (south) side of the Bridgewater Canal.

== Warehouse ==
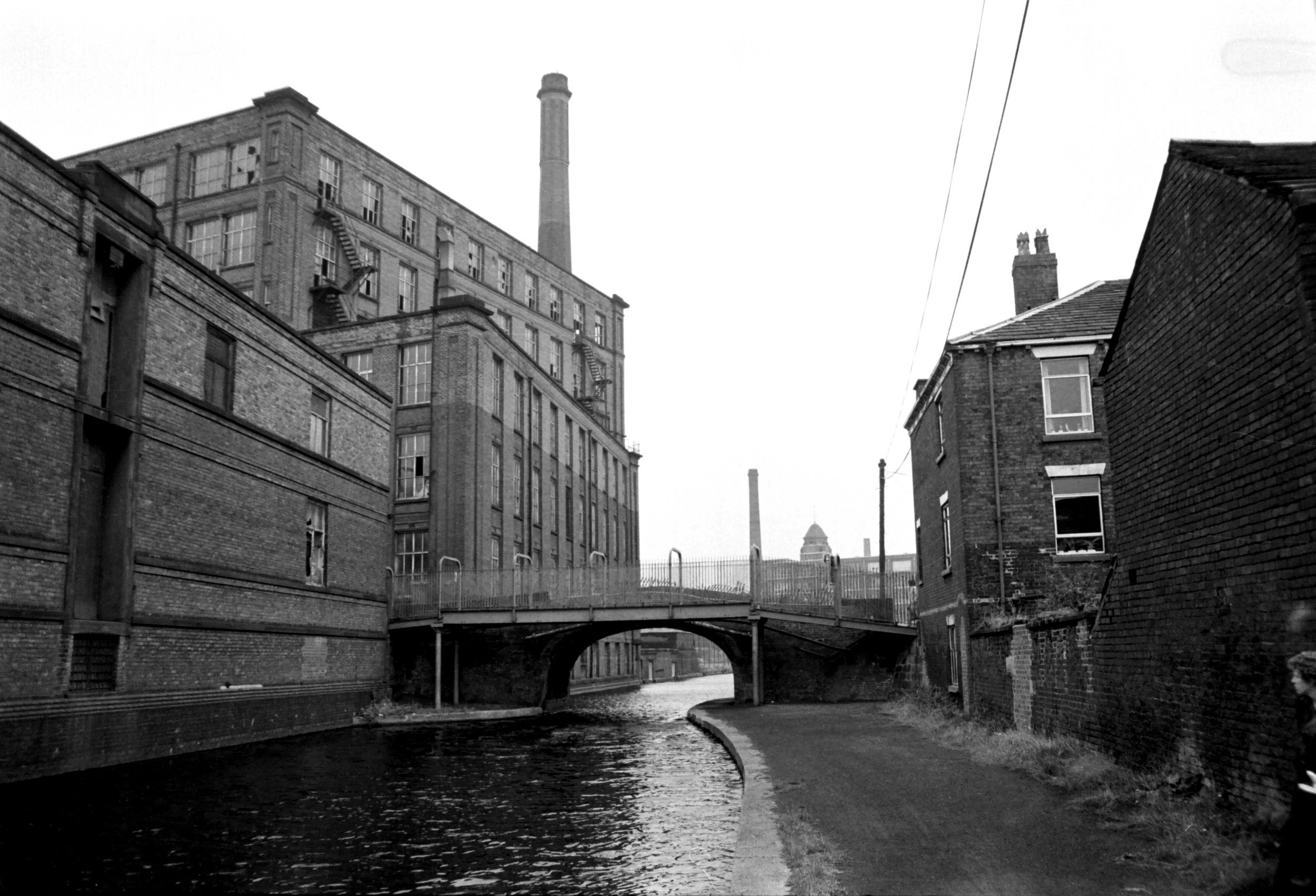
Mather Lane in 1976

The mill's former warehouse on the opposite side of Mather Lane is also grade II listed. It was built around 1882, probably also to designs by Bradshaw and Gass. It is a plain brick structure with three storeys overlooking the canal. It has hoists and taking-in bays on the front and canal elevations.

== See also ==
- List of mills in Wigan
- Listed buildings in Leigh, Greater Manchester
