= Thomas Yates Wright =

British planter (1869–1964)

Colonel Thomas Yates Wright, MBE, VD (1869–1964) was a British planter, who was a cricketer and legislator in Ceylon. He was a tea planter and served in the Legislative Council of Ceylon and the Senate of Ceylon.

Born in Lancashire, the second son of Caleb Wright and Annie Kirkpatrick, Wright went to Ceylon in 1889 as a planter. He was an all-round sportsman, playing cricket, Rugby football, hockey and polo. He represented Matale and Kandy Sports Club at cricket and played for the Up-Country XI from 1893 to 1919. He represented All Ceylon in several matches in the 1890s. He was the founding President of Ceylon Athletic Association

He was commissioned as a second lieutenant in the Ceylon Planters' Rifle Corps (CPRC). Lieutenant Wright served in the Second Boer War from 1900 to 1902 with the Ceylon contingent from the CPRC and went on to serve as the commanding officer of the CPRC from July 1904 to February 1912 with the rank of lieutenant colonel. He was awarded the Volunteer Officers' Decoration and retired as a colonel.

From 1920 to 1925 he was a member of the Legislative Council and was appointed to the Senate of Ceylon in 1947. He owned the Mahakande Estate in which he built a bungalow in 1939 which is now known as Gal Bangalawa. He wrote the book Ceylon in My Time, 1889–1949 in 1951.
