= Geo. Hattersley =

English textile machinery manufacturing company (1789–1983)

G. Hattersley and Sons Ltd
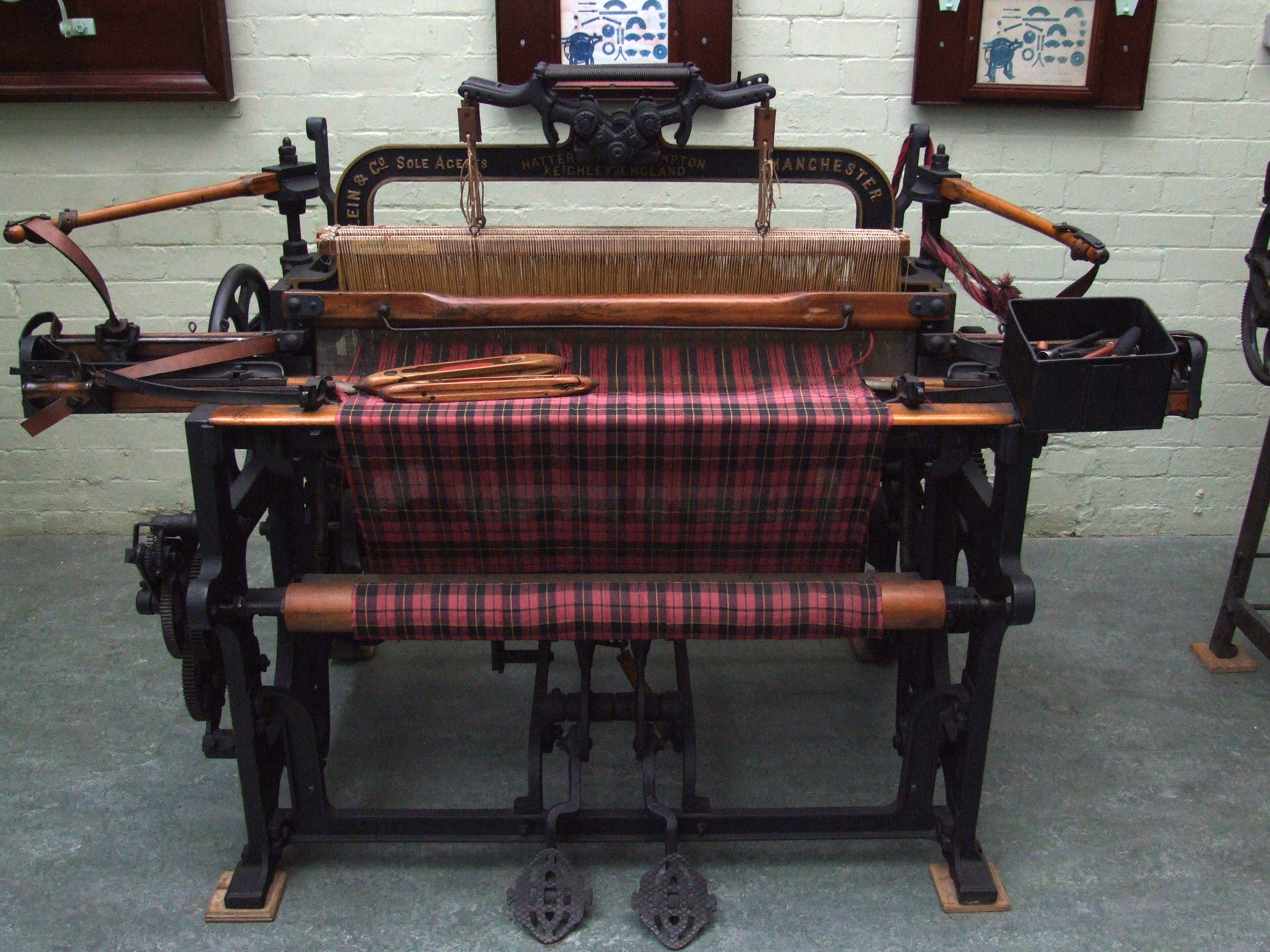
- A Hattersley Domestic Loom
- Company type: Limited
- Industry: Textile machinery
- Founded: 1789
- Defunct: 1983
- Headquarters: Bradford, West Yorkshire, UK
- Products: Winding, Warping and Weaving Machinery for Cotton and Worsted.

Geo. Hattersley was a textile machinery manufacturer from Keighley, West Yorkshire in England, founded in 1789 and responsible for the Hattersley Standard Loom and other types of looms.

== History ==
Richard Hattersley, the founder of the company, served his apprenticeship at Kirkstall Forge. He set up his own business in 1789 at Stubbings Mill, Airworth, manufacturing nuts, bolts, screws and small parts for textile machines. Although the first loom was produced in 1834, it was never delivered as it was smashed up in transit by a group of handloom weavers of the Luddite persuasion who were fearful for their livelihood. A replacement was eventually delivered. Hattersley's prospered and developed an extensive catalogue, adding new products to their range such as tobacco machines and garden furniture. They also ventured into production and the subsidiary companies have survived where the parent did not. G. Hattersley and Sons Ltd closed in 1983.

== Products ==
Hattersley produced a large range of types of looms over 120 years for all sectors of the market, from the narrow band looms to sheeting looms. At one time, they had about 26 basic models in their catalogue.

=== Hattersley Dobby Loom ===
In 1867 George Hattersley and Sons created a loom with a dobby head.

=== Hattersley Narrow Fabric Loom ===
In 1908 Hattersley created smallware looms which were suitable for weaving wicks for oil lamps, and the webbing that is used in the automotive industry. To demonstrate this loom, the firm bought the Cabbage Mills and later the Greegate Shed in Keighley where they started production of these products. The firm survives today as Hattersley Aladdin Ltd.

=== Hattersley Standard Loom ===
After the recapitalisation boom of 1919 cotton yarn production peaked in 1926, a further investment was sparse. Rayon, artificial silk, was invented in the 1930s in Silsden nearby, and the Hattersley Silk Loom was adapted to weave this new fabric.

=== Hattersley Domestic Loom ===
The Hattersley Domestic Loom was part of the Hattersley Domestic System that include other machines such as the pirn winder and warping mill. It was a compact machine, combining all the know-how and precision engineering of the nineteenth century with the need for a treadle-operated loom.

== See also ==
- Hattersley loom
