= Caleb Wright =

British politician (1810–1898)

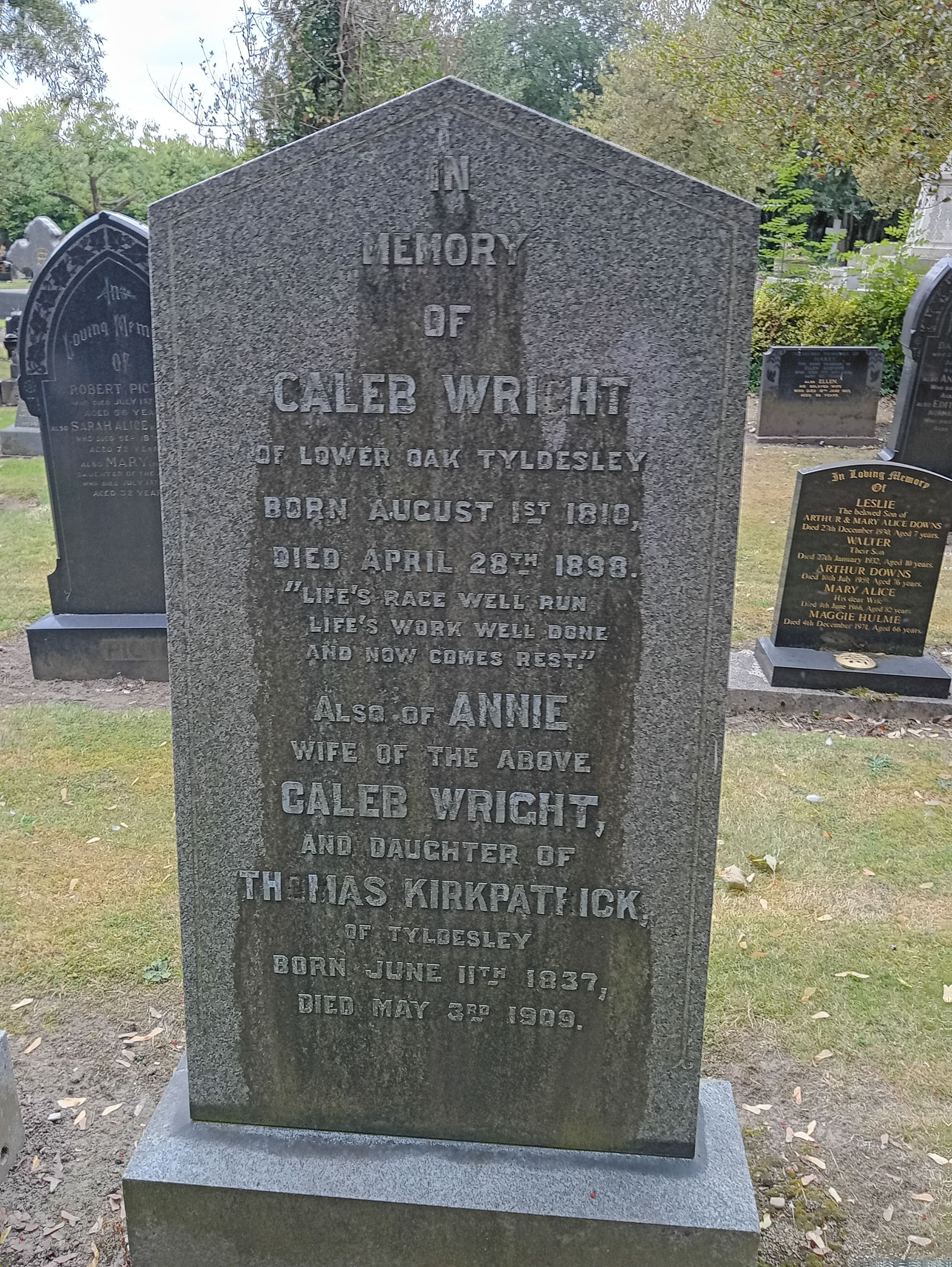

Member of Parliament for Leigh
- In office 1885–1895
- Preceded by: New Constituency
- Succeeded by: C. P. Scott
- Majority: 1,346 (17.0%)

Personal details
- Born: August 1, 1810 Tyldesley, Lancashire, England
- Died: April 28, 1898 (aged 87) Shakerley
- Party: Liberal
- Spouse: Annie Kirkpatrick (1859-1898)
- Children: Thomas Yates Wright, Jane and Frank.
- Occupation: Mill Owner

Caleb Wright (1 August 1810 – 28 April 1898) was an English mill owner and Liberal politician in Lancashire, north-west England.

== Family and chapel ==
Wright was one of thirteen children of William Wright, bookmaker of Tyldesley, near Manchester. The only education he received was by attending night schools. Wright, a Unitarian, was a member of the congregation at Chowbent Chapel where he succeeded his father as organist in 1832. Wright played the trombone but learned to play the organ in a month so he could replace his father. In 1890 Wright donated a site for Chowbent Sunday school next to the chapel.

When Wright was in London he attended Bedford Chapel in Bloomsbury where Stopford Brooke was minister.

Caleb Wright married Annie Kikpatrick in 1859. They had three children, Jane, Frank and Thomas.

== Cotton ==
At the age of nine Wright began work as a "piecer" in a local cotton mill. At the age of 15 he became a spinner and rose to become manager of the mill in 1830. In 1841 he became manager of Ormerod and Hardcastles Mill in Bolton. In 1845 he established his own cotton-spinning business in Tyldesley in partnership with Henry Barton. In 1855 the partnership was dissolved, and Caleb Wright and Company's Barnfield Mills was established. He retired from the company in about 1876.

== Politics ==
Aware of his own beginnings, Wright was sympathetic with the workers, he promoted education, self-improvement and the temperance movement. In his home town he was president of the local Mechanics' Institute, campaigned to build the public baths and supported the Ten-Hours Movement to reduce working hours in factories. Wright became involved in Liberal politics, and became chairman of Tyldesley Local Board.

At the 1885 general election Caleb Wright was invited to stand as the candidate for the newly created Leigh division by the Liberal party. His Tory opponent was Lees Knowles who polled 3,725 votes as against 4,261 for Wright. He was elected as the first Member of Parliament for the new constituency of Leigh. He was re-elected at the next two general elections, before retiring from parliament in 1895. Politically Wright was an advanced radical, and supported both Home Rule for Ireland and women's suffrage. He was also a member of the Liberation Society which sought the disestablishment of the Church of England.

== Death ==
Wright, "Owd Caleb", died at his home, Lower Oak, in Shakerley, Tyldesley in 1898 aged 87. He is buried in Tyldesley Cemetery.

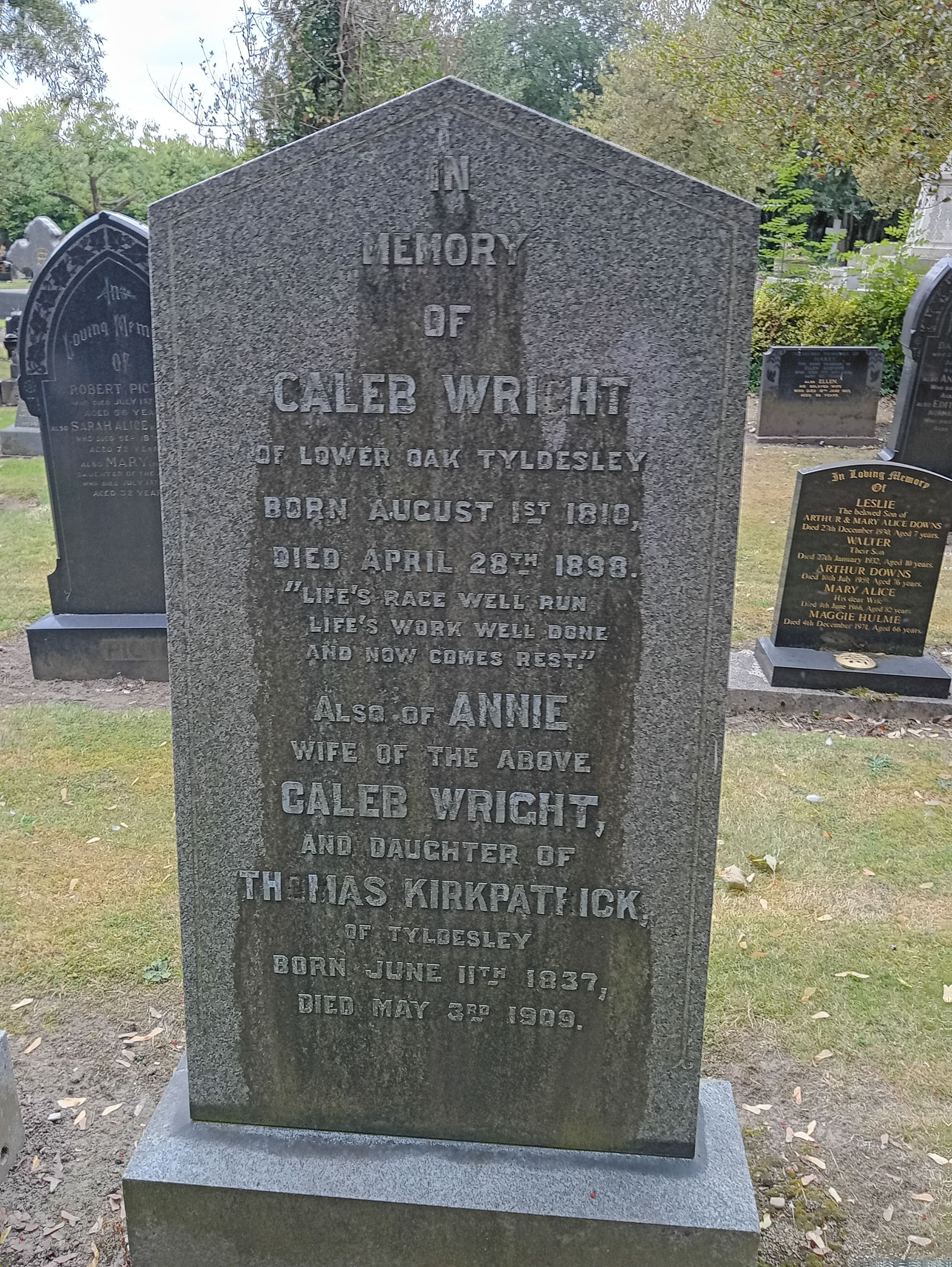
The gravestone of Caleb Wright in Tyldesley Cemetery, a prominent mill owner in the East Lancashire area.

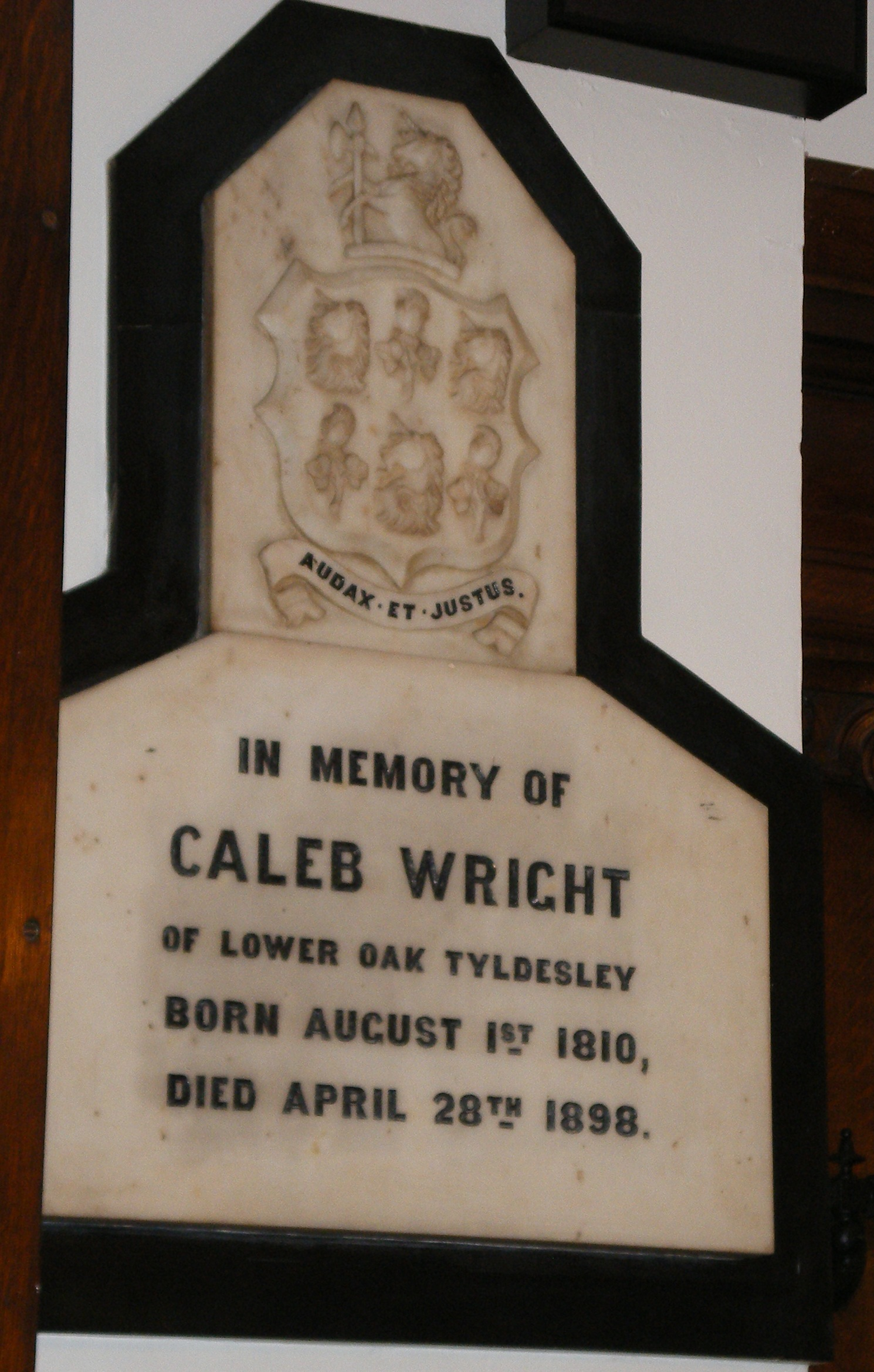
Memorial to Caleb Wright

Parliament of the United Kingdom
New constituency	Member of Parliament for Leigh; 1885–1895	Succeeded by C. P. Scott
