= Butterworth & Dickinson =

Defunct English textile manufacturer

Coordinates: 53°47′13″N 2°15′00″W

Butterworth and Dickinson
- Type: Partnership
- Industry: Textile machinery
- Founded: 1871
- Defunct: 1931
- Headquarters: Manchester, England
- Products: Looms

Butterworth and Dickinson were textile machinery manufacturers in Burnley, Lancashire, England. Known as "Butts and Dicks", the company made looms that were exported around the world.

== History ==
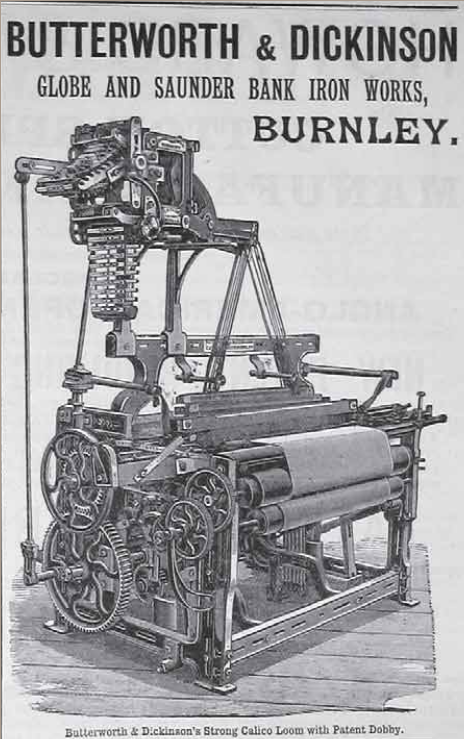
Advert for a Butterworth and Dickinson calico loom

The Saunder Bank works was founded by Samuel Dickinson. It was inherited by his nephew William Banks from Tosside, Bolton-by-Bowland in 1871 and he went into partnership with John Butterworth, of "Oak Bank". The partnership operated the Saunder Bank works which it extended and took on the Globe Iron Works. Around 1889, the company built new premises at Rosegrove. The company had interests in cotton manufacture at the Westgate Shed. William Dickinson was an active businessman who served as Mayor of Burnley.

The company was known as "Butts and Dicks" and made looms that were exported around the world. In the recession of the 1930s, Platt Brothers, Howard & Bullough, Brooks & Doxey, Asa Lees, Dobson & Barlow, Joseph Hibbert, John Hetherington & Sons and Tweedales and Smalley merged to become Textile Machinery Makers Ltd, but the individual units continued to trade under their own names until the 1970, when they were rationalised into one company, Platt UK Ltd. In 1991 the company name changed to Platt Saco Lowell.

The looms were in less demand after the 1950s as the British cotton industry declined. One use was made possible by utilising the looms to weave fibreglass. The resulting cloth was used to create nosecones for fighter aircraft and to create moulds for forming the nosecone of Concorde.

Some looms are in museum collections including the Museum of Science and Industry in Manchester and the National Wool Museum.
