= Taylor, Lang & Co =

British textile machinery manufacturer

Taylor, Lang & Co.
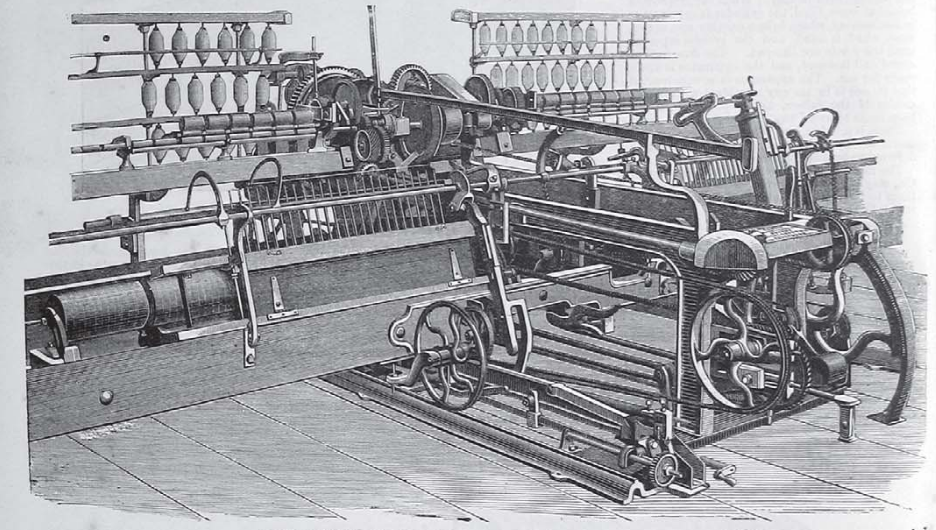
- A selfacting spinning mule built by the company in 1892
- Company type: Limited
- Industry: Textile machinery
- Founded: 1852
- Successor: Textile Machinery Makers Ltd
- Headquarters: Stalybridge, England

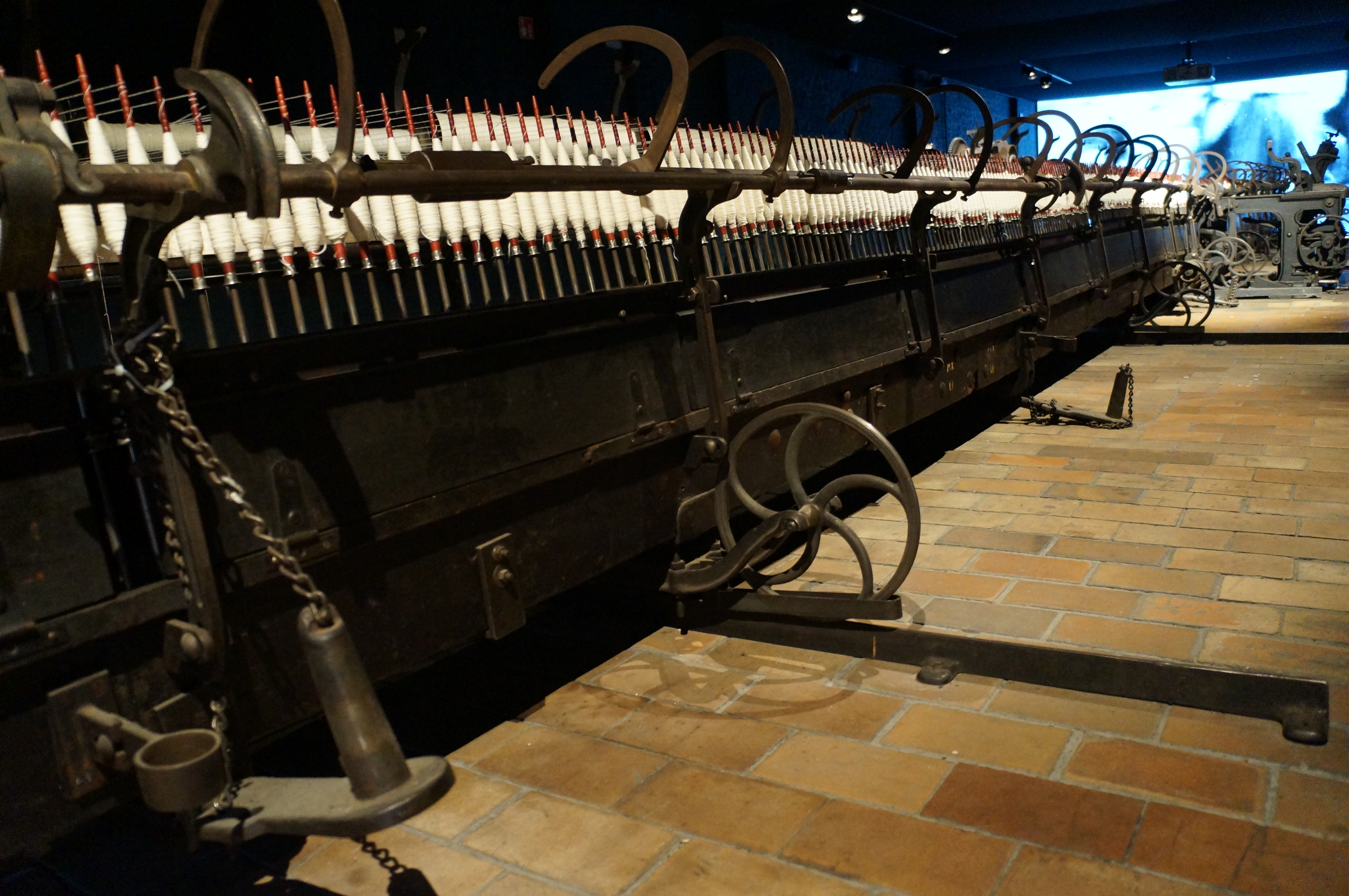
The self-actor at the Industriemuseum, Museum of industry, in Ghent (Belgium) is a spinning machine from the Whitaker L. and Sons spinning mill in Helmshore. The textile machine was built at Taylor, Lang & Co

Taylor, Lang & Co. was a textile machinery manufacturer based in Stalybridge, Greater Manchester, England.

The company was founded in 1852 as a tradesmen's co-operative with twenty-three members. It was originally known locally as 'The Amalgamated Shop'. The name 'Taylor Lang' may have originated in 1859.

Taylor, Lang & Co. was based at the Castle Iron Works on Grosvenor Street, Stalybridge. The site is currently occupied by Plastube Ltd. The founders worked long hours at a reduced wage until the business was well-established and later became known all over the world as Taylor Lang's.

The company designed and manufactured cotton spinning machinery, distributing to a global market. The company's fortunes closely mirrored the broader fortunes of England's cotton manufacturing industry, although export markets later reduced reliance on domestic markets.

In August 1892 William Thomas Watts – the eldest son of one of the company's founders wrote:

"Our business and Cotton Spinning is in a disastrous condition at present. One of the events of the year has been the big strike at The Stalybridge Cotton Mill, lasted about 7 months, and only settled by a universal stoppage of the spinning industries in the three Counties."

In January 1995 William Thomas Watts wrote:

"We have passed through one of the worst business years that our Lancashire men can remember since the American war. Prices have been so cut and pared that it's becoming a common remark that one ought to be thankful to be able to hold one's own. From a statistical return published a few days ago it appears that 93 limited spinning firms taken together for the whole year 1984 have earned upon the whole of th Capital invested in the shape of Shares and Loans the magnificent result of 1 an 7/8% profit. For ourselves, I think we have done rather better than during the previous year, but that is not saying much, as we had been showing a loss for the year."

By 1895 William Thomas Watts wrote that:

"There is certainly much more being sent away in the shape of Spinning Machinery than is being used at home. Makers are fairly well occupied for China and Japan. We have a fair quantity of India this year. We are just completing a large order for Russia. I am expecting from Italy and from Germany and am hoping to hear favourably from the U. States unless the absurd silliness about Venezuela passes out of all control and becomes dangerously contagious."

In the 1920s it acquired Lord Bros. of Todmorden.

In the recession of the 1930s, Platt Brothers, Howard and Bullough, Brooks and Doxey, Asa Lees, Dobson and Barlow, Joseph Hibbert, John Hetherington and Tweedales and Smalley merged to become Textile Machinery Makers Ltd. Taylor, Lang & Co. was the largest company outside this group, but was acquired in 1936. The individual units continued to trade under their own names until 1970, when they were rationalised into one company, Platt UK Ltd. In 1991, this company became Platt Saco Lowell.

== Origins and early history ==
Taylor, Lang & Co. was established in April/May 1852, with a capital of £600. The founders were mechanics in Oldham, but worked in their spare time in a co-op grocery shop where they talked over the idea of applying the cooperative approach to engineering. In January 1852 an industrial dispute (known as "The Great Lock Out") in the Manchester and Oldham district engineering industry led to them being thrown out of permanent employment ("locked out"). Consequently, twenty-three of these workmen came together and set up as cooperative machine makers (machinists). The original members were:

Books (Pattern Maker): James Taylor

Iron Turners: John Storrs, Samuel Booth, Henry England, William C. Birch, Thomas Cheetham

Fitters: Andrew Birchall, William Lees, Thomas Rhodes, Martin Scragg, Charles Rothwell, John Lang, James Byrom, Joseph Walter Watts, James Uttley, Joseph Rushton

Joiners: James Whitehead, James Sutcliffe, Thomas Watson, Jacob Marshall

Moulders: Thomas Armitage, Samuel Mitchell

Grinder: Joseph Woolhouse

A reorganisation of the firm took place in 1859, in which seven of the original members withdrew their interests. These members were James Sutcliffe, Thomas Watson, Martin Scragg, James Uttley, Thomas Cheetham, Charles Rothwell and Jacob Marshall. Another original member, Samuel Mitchell, had died prior to 1859.

As of 14 May 1872, Taylor, Lang & Co. became incorporated under the Companies Act of 1862. A Memorandum of Association was completed and signed on 25 April 1872, securing limited liability for the company's members. The capital of the company was declared as £50,000, divided into 5000 shares of £10 each. 700 shares were taken up immediately, by John Lang, 'Brick of Cocker Hill', James Whitehead, Thomas Rhodes, Henry England, Joseph Watts and John Storrs. Notice of the Situation of the Registered Office of Taylor, Lang & Co. Limited was provided as "The Castle Ironworks in Back Grosvenor Street in Stalybridge in the County of Cheshire." The final Charter Agreement was signed on 24 June 1872.

The firm exhibited at the Royal Jubilee Exhibition in Manchester in May 1887 as well as smaller exhibitions in London, Liverpool and Bradford

== Order Books ==
The Lancashire Archives in Bow Lane, Preston, Lancashire contains 26 Order Books for various types of machinery dating between Dec. 1873 and March 1936 (Ref DDPSL/7). Various other documents are also held including technical drawings and catalogues.

== Devaluing of shares ==
A Special Resolution was passed on 5 August 1887 (confirmed a month later on 2 September), "that One Share be added to each holder of Four Shares in the Capital of the Company."

Another Special Resolution three years later altered Article No.43 of the company's manifesto, stating that "No business shall be transacted at any General Meeting except the declaration of a dividend, unless a quorum of members is present at the time when the Meeting proceeds to business, and that 15 of the Members competent to vote shall constitute a quorum." Another, passed 14 September 1900 (confirmed 5 October), introduced a maximum of six and a minimum of four directors, alongside minor changes to the dating and wording of articles relating to the Annual General Meeting.

A Special Resolution passed 28 November 1934 (confirmed 7 December) led to the devaluing of company shares. It decreed, "That the Capital of the Company be reduced from £50,000, divided into 5,000 shares of £10 each, to £29,350, divided into 4,130 issues shares of £5 each (fully paid up)and 870 unissued shares of £10 each, and that such reduction shall be effected by returning to the Holders of the said 4,130 issued shares capital in excess of the wants of the company to the extent of £5 per share and by reducing the nominal value of each of the said 4,130 shares from £10 to £5." It also stated, "That immediately upon the aforesaid reduction of capital taking effect (a) each of the 4,130 issued shares of £5 each (fully paid up), (b) each of the 870 unissued shares of £10 each be divided into 10 shares of £1 each and (c) the capital of the company be increased from £29,350 (resulting from such reduction) to £50,000 by the creation of 20,650 shares of £1 each." The legal papers from HM Court of Justice, Manchester, confirming the devaluing of shares and including a complete list of shareholders, were completed on 14 February and 1 March 1935.

A letter from Taylor, Lang & Co. to the Registrar of Joint Stock Companies, sent 27 February 1935, resolved a dispute over certain shares allotted in 1872 and 1887 on a non-monetary basis. The correspondence stated that these shares had previously "always been treated and dealt with as fully paid up shares." A further confirmation of shares was carried out in order to dispense with the settlement of a list of creditors. This document also contains a certificate that reveals Taylor, Lang & Co. Limited had, "by Special Resolution reduced its capital by an Order in the High Court of Justice Chancery Division, Manchester District Registry, bearing date the 11th day of April, 1935."

== Industrial Action impacting production ==
The formation and actions of unions to improve the conditions of workers impacted the company. For example, on 7 August 1889 William Thomas Watts wrote that the firm's, "in the thick of a with the Amalgamated Society of Engineers ("A.S.E."). We are having a turn with the Moulders now. The struggle with the A.S.E. was brought through by the gigantic federation of employers' associations discharging all members of the A.S.E. for the time being and thus bringing about the greatest lockout of the Century in our and Kindred trades. The present trouble we (T.L.& Co) are meeting, by making it possible to get out our Castings by using boys and labourers or plate moulders with the help of additional appliances. It does not appear at all a big thing to trouble about, but it is causing us much dislocation and annoyance at the present juncture, since we are so full up, that with all our best efforts undisturbed we must have been much behind with our delivery. We are busy indeed." Despite the challenges Mr W.T. Watts reported then that, "we have just finished off for the year 1898-1899 and I am pleased to say that the result is very satisfactory indeed. The best we have had for some years, and the outlook for ensuring year seems equally good."

== The winding-up and take-over of Taylor Lang & Co. ==
As the north-west's cotton industry experienced a severe decline during the recession of the 1930s, Platt Brothers, Howard and Bullough, Brooks and Doxey, Asa Lees, Dobson and Barlow, Joseph Hibbert, John Hetherington and Tweedales and Smalley merged to become Textile Machinery Makers Ltd. Taylor, Lang & Co. was the largest company outside this group, but was acquired in 1936. The individual units continued to trade under their own names until the 1970, when they were rationalised into one company called Platt UK Ltd. In 1991 the company name changed to Platt Saco Lowell.

=== Declarations and dates relating to takeover ===
- Notice of Situation of Registered Office (or of any change therein), 22 April 1937 – Registered office of Taylor, Lang & Co. now situated at Union Iron Works, Thomas Street, West Gorton, Manchester.
- Declaration of solvency, 18 June 1937 – Declares "That we have made a full enquiry into the affairs of this Company, and that, having so done, we have formed the opinion that this Company will be able to pay its debts in full within a period, not exceeding twelve months, from the commencement of the winding up."
- Special Resolution; Passed 3 July 1937 – "That Taylor, Lang & Co., Limited be wound up voluntarily."
- Appointment of Liquidator of Taylor, Lang & Co., 3 July 1937 – "I, Wright Cropper, of Union Iron Works, West Gorton, Manchester hereby give you Notice that I have been appointed Liquidator of Taylor, Lang & Co., Limited, by Resolution of the Company dated the third day of July 1937."
- Consent to take the name of an existing company, 6 November 1937 – Name taken by Wright Cropper of Union Iron Works, West Gorton
- Return of the Final Winding-up Meeting of Taylor, Lang & Co., 27 November 1937 – Confirmation of winding-up, signed by liquidator, including liquidators statements of account
- Extraordinary Resolution; Passed 27 November 1937 – "At the Final General Meeting of the Members of the above-named Company, duly convened, and held at 70 Spring Gardens, Manchester, in the County of Lancaster, on the 27th day of November 1937, the following Extraordinary Resolution was duly passed: "That the books, accounts and documents of the Company be kept a Union Iron Works, West Gorton, Manchester, until 31 December 1940, after which date they may be destroyed. Signed, "W. Cropper, Liquidator."

The final mule order received by Taylor, Lang & Co. was from Broadfield Mills in Heywood, on 12 March 1936, for a mule with just one headstock. This is typical of the scale of orders the company were receiving by that point.

== Edward Buckley ==
One of the most significant figures in the history of Taylor, Lang & Co. was the mechanic and inventor Edward Buckley. The son of Stalybridge blacksmith Radcliffe Buckley, Edward was born on Brierley Street in the Castle Hall area of the town, on 13 April 1838. He was educated at Thomas Avison's 'People's School', and undertook apprenticeships as a grocer's assistant and wheelwright. He found his calling as a mechanic, learning the trade at Messrs. Broadbent's Machinists. Following a period working as a journeyman, Edward became involved with a newly established firm of machinists in nearby Dukinfield. He was offered the opportunity to eventually become a partner in the company, but the venture proved unsuccessful and was short-lived.

Edward then joined Taylor, Lang & Co., who at that time made carding machines. When the firm stopped manufacturing this line, Edward entered the 'scutcher' (a beating-engine, used to bring floss and refuse silk to a downy condition) department, where he succeeded his supervisor (Thomas Rhodes) as the head of department. His passion and eye for innovation and inventions resulted in a series of design improvements and labour-saving combinations, including the self-acting mule headstock. These advances resulted in the firm's profit and international stature increasing rapidly; Edward was subsequently elected to a seat on the directorate in 1872. The biographer Samuel Hill described Edward Buckley as "somewhat reserved and quiet; in his dealings straight, and perhaps blunt." Hill continued, "Having himself known the difficulties which face the aspiring working man, he needed no imitation to enlighten him as to the qualities of those who came beneath his supervision. Although his success had enriched him in a worldly sense, it made little difference in his bearing and domestic surroundings; pride and show were strangers to his composition."

Edward was also involved in local politics, attaining the position of Town Councillor as a Conservative. Edward died during his term of office on 15 May 1894, having spent his final months struggling to overcome the death of his wife.

== Working Examples ==
In addition to the self-actor at the Industriemuseum in Ghent (Belgium), a working example of a self-acting Mule made in 1926 can be seen at the Quarry Bank Museum in Wilmslow.
