= Royd Mill, Oldham =

Cotton mill in Greater Manchester, England

Royd Mill
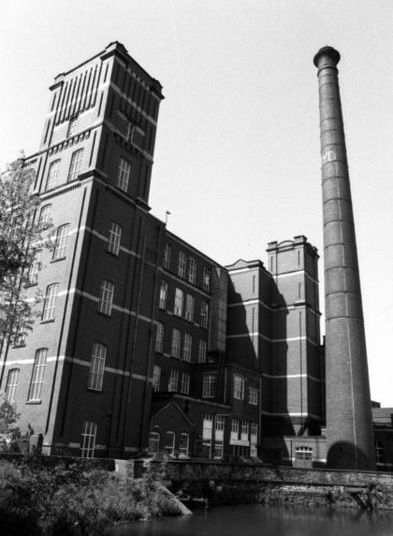
- The mill in 1983

- Location in Greater Manchester

Spinning
- Location: Hollinwood, Oldham, Greater Manchester, England
- Serving canal: Rochdale Canal, Hollinwood Branch Canal
- Serving railway: Oldham Loop Line
- Owner: Royd Mill Ltd.
- Further ownership: Lancashire Cotton Corporation (1930s); Courtaulds (1964)
- Coordinates: 53.5268°N 2.1328°W

Construction
- Demolished: 2015

Design team
- Architect: A.J. Howcroft

Power
- Date: 1907
- Engine maker: J & E Wood
- Engine type: inverted vertical triple expansion engine
- Valve Gear: Corliss valves
- Cylinder diameter and throw: 18 ½"HP, 28 ½"IP, 43"LP X 3ft 6" stroke
- rpm: 94 rpm
- Installed horse power (ihp): 900
- Flywheel diameter: 14/16ft
- Transmission type: rope
- No. of ropes: 20

Boiler configuration
- Boilers: Triple Tetlow, coal fired
- Pressure: 180psi

Equipment
- Manufacturer: Asa Lees, and Howard & Bullough
- Mule Frames: 80,000 spindles (1915)

Royd Mill, Oldham was a cotton spinning mill in Hollinwood, Oldham, Greater Manchester, England. It was built in 1907, and extended in 1912 and 1924. It was taken over by the Lancashire Cotton Corporation in the 1930s and passed to Courtaulds in 1964. Production finished in 1981. The mill was demolished in 2015 to make way for a "DifRent" housing scheme.

== Location ==
Oldham is a large town in Greater Manchester, England. It lies amongst the Pennines on elevated ground between the rivers Irk and Medlock, 5.3 miles (8.5 km) south-southeast of Rochdale, and 6.9 miles (11.1 km) northeast of the city of Manchester. Oldham is surrounded by several smaller settlements which together form the Metropolitan Borough of Oldham; Chadderton and Hollinwood are such settlements. Chadderton and Hollinwood are served by the Rochdale Canal and the Hollinwood Branch Canal. A rail service was provided by the Oldham Loop Line which was built by the Lancashire and Yorkshire Railway.

== History ==
Oldham rose to prominence during the 19th century as an international centre of textile manufacture. It was a boomtown of the Industrial Revolution, and amongst the first ever industrialised towns, rapidly becoming "one of the most important centres of cotton and textile industries in England", spinning Oldham counts, the coarser counts of cotton. Oldham's soils were too thin and poor to sustain crop growing, and so for decades prior to industrialisation the area was used for grazing sheep, which provided the raw material for a local woollen weaving trade. It was not until the last quarter of the 18th century that Oldham changed from being a cottage industry township producing woollen garments via domestic manual labour, to a sprawling industrial metropolis of textile factories. The first mill, Lees Hall, was built by William Clegg in about 1778. Within a year, 11 other mills had been constructed, but by 1818 there were only 19 of these privately owned mills.

It was in the second half of the 19th century, that Oldham became the world centre for spinning cotton yarn. This was due in a large part to the formation of limited liability companies known as Oldham Limiteds. In 1851, over 30% of Oldham's population was employed within the textile sector, compared to 5% across Great Britain. At its zenith, it was the most productive cotton spinning mill town in the world. By 1871 Oldham had more spindles than any country in the world except the United States, and in 1909, was spinning more cotton than France and Germany combined. By 1911 there were 16.4 million spindles in Oldham, compared with a total of 58 million in the United Kingdom and 143.5 million in the world; in 1928, with the construction of the UK's largest textile factory Oldham reached its manufacturing zenith. At its peak, there were over 360 mills, operating night and day;

Royd Mill was built in 1907 for Messrs Murgatroyd of Sunnybank House, but taken over shortly after by Royd Mill Ltd, and extended in 1912. The industry peaked that year when it produced 8 billion yards of cloth. The Great War of 1914–18 halted the supply of raw cotton, and the British government encouraged its colonies to build mills to spin and weave cotton. The war over, Lancashire never regained its markets. The independent mills were struggling, but Royd mill expanded again in 1924. The Bank of England set up the Lancashire Cotton Corporation in 1929 to attempt to rationalise and save the industry. Royd Mill, Oldham was one of 104 mills bought by the LCC, and one of the 53 mills that survived through to 1950, and continued until 1981.

== Architecture ==
Royd Mill before 1951

=== Power ===
Driven by a 900 hp inverted vertical triple expansion engine by J & E Wood, 1907. It had a 14/16 ft flywheel with 20 ropes, operating at 94 rpm. The original three Tetlow boilers still supplied steam at 180psi, when in 1961 electric drives were installed.

=== Equipment ===
In 1915, it had 80,000 spindles by Asa Lees, and Howard & Bullough.

== Owners ==
- Messrs Murgatroyd
- Royd Mill Ltd
- Lancashire Cotton Corporation (1930s–1964)
- Courtaulds (1964–)

== See also ==
- Textile manufacturing
