= Royd =

Royd may refer to:

- Royd Anderson (born 1972), Cuban-American filmmaker
- Royd Chambers (1961), American politician

== See also ==
- Fox Royd, an area of Thornhill, West Yorkshire, England
- Hebden Royd, a civil parish in West Yorkshire, England
- Royd House, in Hale, Greater Manchester, England
- Royd Mill, Oldham, in Greater Manchester, England
- Royd Moor Wind Farm, in South Yorkshire, England
