= Weavers' Triangle =

Historic textile-producing area with a cotton museum in Lancashire, England

Weavers' Triangle Visitor Centre
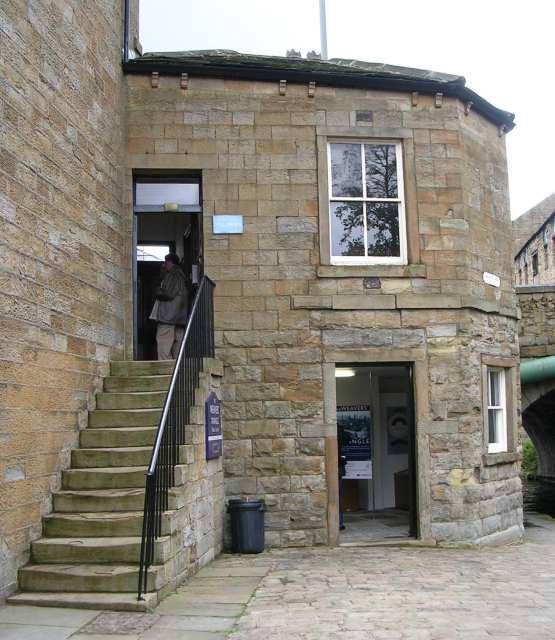

- Shown within Burnley town centre
- Established: 26 August 1980
- Location: 85 Manchester Rd, Burnley, Lancashire, England
- Coordinates: 53.7864°N 2.2461°W
- Type: Historic textile-producing area with a cotton museum
- Website: Official website

The Weavers' Triangle is an area of Burnley in Lancashire, England consisting mostly of 19th-century industrial buildings at the western side of town centre clustered around the Leeds and Liverpool Canal. The area has significant historic interest as the cotton mills and associated buildings encapsulate the social and economic development of the town and its weaving industry. From the 1980s, the area has been the focus of major redevelopment efforts.

== History ==
In the 1700s, Burnley, like Marsden and Colne, was a centre of the wool industry. It switched to cotton in the first half of the 1800s. Hargreaves' hand-operated spinning jenny was introduced in Blackburn in 1767; the model patented had 16 sixteen spindles and was treated with suspicion. The spinning jenny produced thread suitable for weft. Arkwright's power-driven water frame, which produced the greater twist suitable for warp, was even more unpopular. In 1777, Arkwright built a mill at Birkacre in Chorley. By 1779, the momentum against power-driven spinning machinery was such that rioters destroyed it. Spinners and investors were driven from Blackburn and Burnley towards Manchester, and it was many years before a spinning mill was built in Burnley.

In the early 1790s, construction of the Leeds and Liverpool Canal resumed after a decade-long suspension caused by the American War of Independence. During this time, the increasing economic importance of coal led to a change in the agreed. but disputed, route of the canal. It was moved south, away from Clitheroe's agricultural lime, to a more expensive route via the Burnley Coalfield. At Burnley, the route almost encircled the town, passing through fields outside of it. Although weaving existed in the area, it was a woollen industry for local markets. The canal's opening coincided with the rise of cotton weaving and the use of steam power in textile mills, allowing greater freedom in their placement.

The 1840s proved pivotal to the development of the area. The canal company began allowing mills to take the water they needed for steam engines directly from the canal. In 1848, the East Lancashire Railway opened to the barracks near the western end of Trafalgar Street. And in 1849, the Manchester and Leeds Railway opened a branch from Todmorden to Burnley (extended soon after). A goods shed was sited at Thorneybank at the eastern end of Trafalgar Street, where the town's cinema stands today. Of the many new cotton mills subsequently constructed along the canal, this meant that the greatest concentration formed in what was then part of the township of Habergham Eaves.

The second half of the 19th century saw Burnley develop into the most important cotton-weaving town in the world. The area later to be known as the weavers' triangle, officially became part of the town in 1894. By 1911, the town's textile industry was at the height of its prosperity, and there were approximately 99,000 power looms in operation. The town's population had grown from 4,000 (1801) to over 100,000.

The almost terminal decline of the English cotton industry in the decades that followed World War II, brought great difficulties to the local economy. During successive attempts to regenerate the town, many of the mills were demolished, however most in the triangle area were protected and today stand as monuments to the past.

== Architecture ==
The Weavers triangle is notable for the juxtaposition of so many 19th-century buildings rather than specific building. However, Ashmore, in his work on industrial archaeology, does point out certain specific buildings of interest.

=== Canal warehouses ===
At Manchester Road Wharf on the northern side of the canal, there is a group of three warehouses each of a different age and style. On wharf I (SD8387 3228) there is an 1801 two-storey, stone warehouse of seven by three bays. It was built parallel to the canal allowing direct unloading from the barges using catshead cranes. On wharf II (SD 8385 3235) there is a single-storey, open-fronted stone warehouse. This was built in the 1890s. The roof is supported by four rows of full-height cast-iron columns. This type of warehouse remained a feature of dock architecture well into the 20th century. On wharf III at SD8383 3232 is a four-storey 1841 stone-built warehouse, that is parallel to the canal. The floors and the queen post truss roof are supported by cast-iron columns. On the road side there is a projecting three-storey loading bay.

=== Weaving sheds ===
A traditional weaving mill would have a two- or three-storey preparation area for pirning the yarn, beaming and sizing attached to an engine house with a 500 hp mill engine, boiler house and chimney. The line shafts from the engine would pass into a large single-storey weaving shed with its characteristic sawtooth roof with north lights. Weaving was the principal activity here, the larger spinning mills of the Oldham Limited of the late 19th century ware built in towns further south. The Burnley loom was a narrow loom that produced grey cloth suitable for printing. Here we find many such stone-built mills such as the Waterloo Shed north of Trafalgar Street and the Wiseman Street Shed, the Sandygate Shed (c1860), and the brick-built Woodfield Mill (1886).

=== Spinning mills ===
Victoria Mill SD833326 53°47′20″N 2°15′18″W early four-storey spinning mill from the 1850 built on Trafalgar Street for throstle spinning, There was however a small attached weaving shed.

=== Combined mills ===
Trafalgar mill to the west of Waterloo shed is an example of a combined mill- one that did the spinning and then passed the yarn to its own weaving sheds. This was a four-storey stone built in 1840 as mule spinning mill and later extended with attached weaving sheds. Sprinkler systems became essential in the 1880s and a water tank was added. Clock Tower mill, on the north side of the canal east of Sandygate was another. It was built c. 1840 by George Slater; there were four- and five-storey spinning mills by the canal and a six-storey 5-by-9-bay with a clock tower, the weaving shed was to the east. John Watts (Burnley) Ltd ran the mill from 1890 to the 1980s.

=== Foundries ===
Burnley was the home to the Burnley Iron Works SD 836326 53°47′20″N 2°15′00″W a large engineering firm, which made mill engines including the Harle Syke engine displayed in the London Science Museum. Butterworth & Dickinson, Harling and Todd and Pemberton had foundries and built looms here. Globe Iron Works was firstly used by but was taken over in 1870 by Butterfield and Dickinson. The Waterloo Iron works was owned by Onias Pickles, who acquired the business of Thomas Sagar manufacturing plain Burnley looms. In 1887 it was bought by the Pemberton Brothers who continued in manufacturing until 1963.

List of Buildings in the Weavers' Triangle

Building	Built	Demol	Description	Notes	Coordinates
Albert Mill	1870(c)	-	Cotton Mill	Built as a Spinning mill for Thomas Pomfret	53.78833°N 2.25129°W
Belle Vue Mill	1863	-	Cotton Mill	Built as a weaving mill	53.79022°N 2.25453°W
Burnley Wharf	1796	-	Wharf and stables on Leeds and Liverpool Canal	Site of the Weavers' Triangle Visitor Centre	53.78681°N 2.24646°W
Caledonia Mill	1835	pre 1998	Cotton Mill	Built as a Cotton mill and Boiler works. Cotton mill only after 1860. Only small part survives	53.78870°N 2.25176°W
Canal Street Shed	1880	2008	Cotton Mill	Built as a weaving mill. Occupies part of the former Burnley Iron Works site. Only small part survives	53.78891°N 2.24980°W
Celtique Mill (Waterloo Shed)	1860s	-	Cotton Mill	Weaving Shed	53.78714°N 2.24966°W
Charlotte Street Mill	1848	-	Cotton Mill	Built as a Weaving mill called Queen Street Mill. Renamed in 1916	53.78850°N 2.24886°W
Clock Tower Mill	1840	2004	Cotton Mill	Built as a spinning mill. Extended in 1857, Clock tower added in 1867	53.78921°N 2.25105°W
George Street Mill	1878(c)	2008	Cotton Mill	Built as a weaving mill. Occupies part of the former Burnley Iron Works site. Only a small part survives	53.78841°N 2.25002°W
Globe Iron Works	1830–1848	2004	Iron Works	One of the sites of Butterworth & Dickinson loom maker	53.78641°N 2.24969°W
Habergham Eaves Parochial School	1840	-	Former School	Built by Holy Trinity Church as a day School	53.78852°N 2.25216°W
Hope Works	1874	-	Cotton Mill	Weaving Shed built for Thomas Carr	53.78694°N 2.24927°W
Lord Nelson Inn	???	-	Public House	Still in use as a pub, now called the Ministry of Ale	53.78601°N 2.24788°W
Meadow Mill	1910	-	Cotton Mill	Stands on the site of the earlier Walker Hey Mill. Rebuilt in 1950 following a fire.	53.78797°N 2.24919°W
Mount Pleasant Baptist Chapel	1835	-	Church	Originally constructed by the Protestant Wesleyan Methodist Society, bought by Baptists in 1868.	53.78730°N 2.24621°W
Nelson House	1805	-	Georgian Villa	Built by the Holgate family; Currently used as a Masonic Hall	53.78648°N 2.24726°W
Neptune Inn	1825(c)	-	Public House		53.78958°N 2.25116°W
Oak Mount Mill	1840	-	Cotton Mill	Cotton spinning mill built by William Hopwood to replace woollen mill. Converted to weaving. Extended in 1849 and 1887.	53.78694°N 2.24927°W
Old Malthouse	1850–1890	-	Warehouse	Malt Warehouse probably connected to Massey's Bridge End Brewery nearby	53.78975°N 2.25055°W
Plane Tree Inn	???	-	Public House	Built by William Hopwood as a private home, converted to an inn in 1897	53.79004°N 2.24963°W
Sandygate Mill	1859	-	Cotton Mill	Built for George Slater	53.78900°N 2.25271°W
Sandygate Shed	???	pre 1998	Cotton Mill	Built for George Slater	53.78964°N 2.25164°W
Slater Terrace	1850	-	Cotton Mill	Built for George Slater as 11 workers houses over a canalside warehouse. Ceased use as housing in 1900 and converted for use by Sandygate Mill	53.78920°N 2.25227°W
Thorneybank Mill	c1860	-	Cotton Mill	Built for Graham and Shepherd as a spinning Mill, converted to weaving in 1884	53.78648°N 2.24846°W
Trafalgar Mill	1846	-	Cotton Mill	Built as a Mule spinning Mill. Owned for many years by the Thompson family	53.78748°N 2.24994°W
Trafalgar Shed	1860(c)	1980(c?)	Cotton Mill	Weaving Shed. Now the site of a garage. Some original walls survive	53.78784°N 2.25057°W
Victoria Mill	1855	-	Cotton Mill	Built as a Throstle spinning Mill. Tower and 2-storey shed added in 1889	53.78954°N 2.25415°W
Waterloo Hotel	1865(c)	-	Public House		53.78872°N 2.25254°W
Waterloo Foundry	1885	-	Iron Works	Built for O. Pickles & Co. Taken over by Pemberton & Sons loom makers in 1890. 4-storey Trafalgar Street extension in 1907, only part survives.	53.78917°N 2.25324°W
Westgate Shed	1886	-	Cotton Mill	Weaving shed	53.79005°N 2.25012°W
Woodfield Mill	1888	-	Cotton Mill	Weaving shed	53.78936°N 2.25535°W
Source: Lowe, John (1985). Burnley. Phillimore. ISBN 978-0-85033-595-8.

== Visitor centre ==
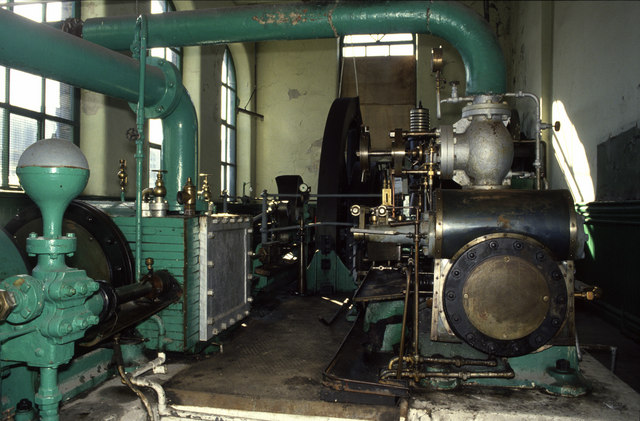
Steam engine, Oak Mount Mill

In 1977, the Burnley Industrial Museum Action Committee was formed to work for the preservation of the town's heritage. The Weavers' Triangle Toll House museum was established on 26 July 1980, and opened by Brian Redhead. and is staffed by volunteers the Weavers' Triangle Trust. It was initially housed in 2 rooms of the former canal offices on Manchester Road, but expanded into the adjacent wharfmaster's house in 1987 and was renamed to the Weavers' Triangle Visitor Centre. It has also received accreditation from Museums, Libraries and Archives Council. In 1993 they took over the engine house and chimney at Oak Mount Mill. In 1996, a project began to restore the steam engine at Oak Mount Mill with funding from the National Lottery, Burnley council and the Museums and Galleries Commission. The restoration project was completed in 2001, with an electric motor powering the engine as replacing the boiler was deemed too expensive. Both the engine and the building are now listed as scheduled monuments.

== Geography ==
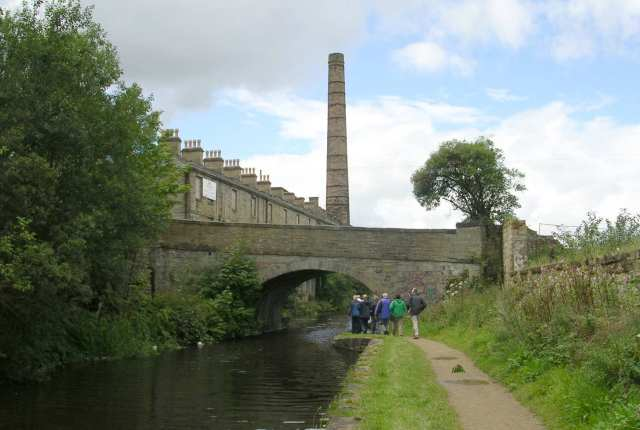
The Burnley Way passing Sandygate Bridge

The Weavers Triangle's 19th-century industrial landscape forms the south western edge of the town centre in Burnley, it adjoins the civic, cultural and commercial centres of the town. It is bounded on the south-west by established housing. The River Calder passes through the town, and is joined by the River Brun. The Leeds and Liverpool Canal is the spine around which the Weavers Triangle developed when it was built in 1796 giving Burnley access to Liverpool and a supply of cotton from the Mississippi Basin and Egypt, and coal to power steam engines. The level of the canal is more than 10 metres (33 ft) above that of the rivers. The canal passes southwest of the Calder, before turning north by northeast and crossing the two river valleys on the straight 1,350 yards (1,234 m) long 60 feet (18 m) high Burnley Embankment. It passes over the Calder at 53°47′11″N 2°14′16″W and the Brun at 53°47′50″N 2°14′05″W.

The heritage area of the Weavers' Triangle is defined by an area bounded by Manchester Road, Trafalgar Street, Westgate and Queen's Lancashire Way. In planning terms the Weavers' Triangle development area expands further south-west, and along the canal to Finsley Gate bridge.

Burnley Way passes through the area and along the towpath of the canal starting and finishing at the Visitor Centre. The Caldervale railway passes to the south, and Manchester Road station is approximately 200 metres from the visitor centre, 53°47′11″N 2°14′47″W. The East Lancashire Line passes to the north, and Barracks station is north of the site.

== Regeneration ==
=== 1980s ===
In April 1987, Clock Tower Mill was damaged by a fire that rendered the building unusable.

=== 1990s ===
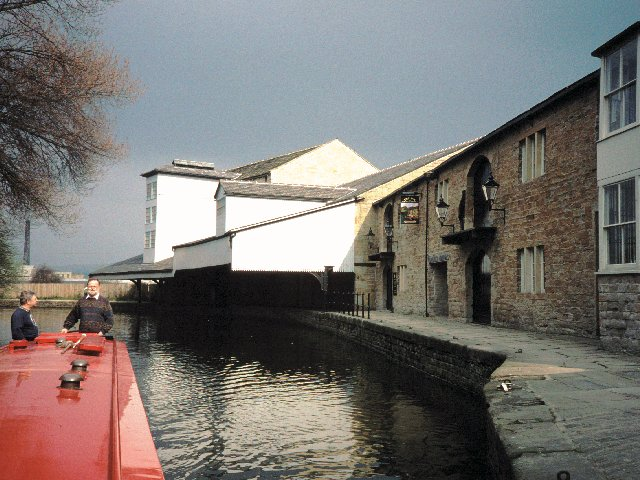
Burnley wharf on the Leeds and Liverpool Canal

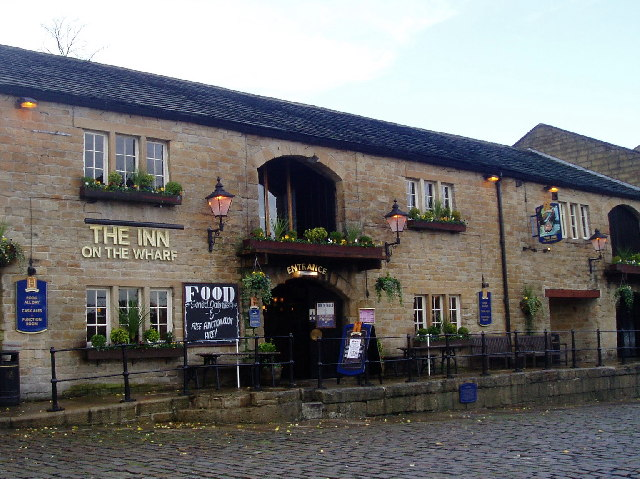
Former warehouse at Burnley wharf

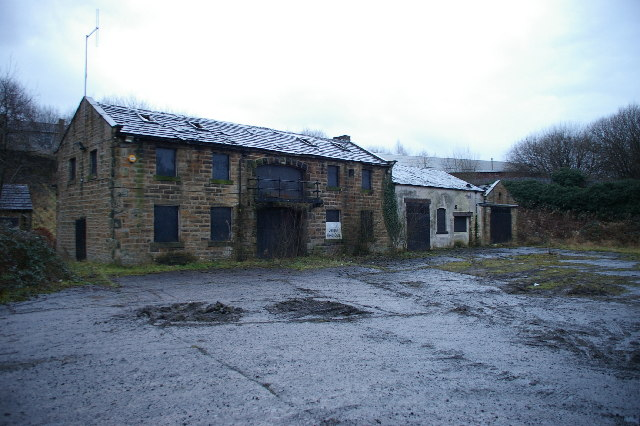
Finsley wharf

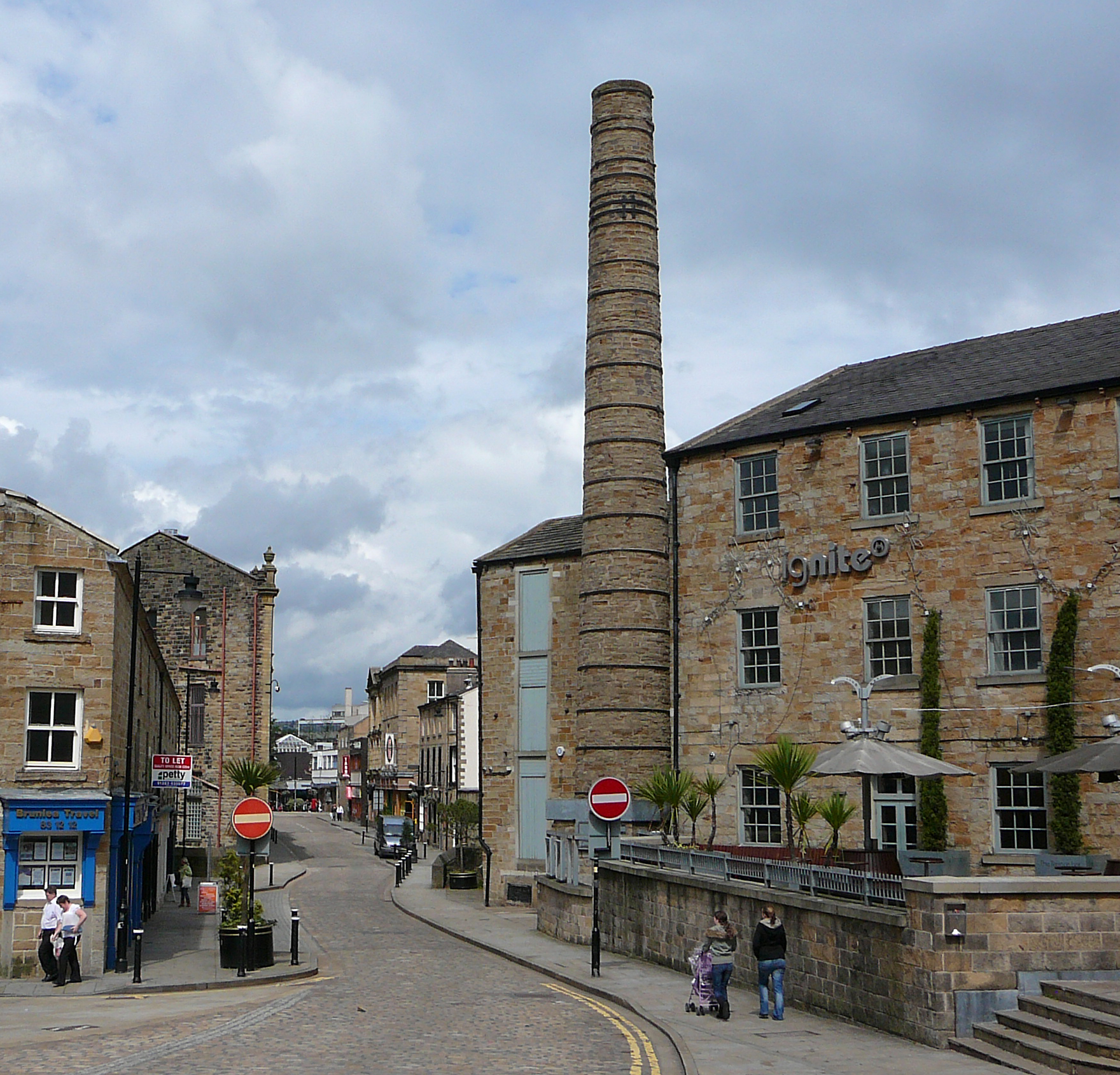
Former Iron Works and Hammerton St

Between 1990 and 1996 extensive refurbishment took place at Trafalgar Mill funded by the ERDF, English Heritage and Burnley Council. The work included re-roofing, repointing, sand blasting the walls and replacing windows. Parts of the building have been let to local businesses.

In the mid-1990s Burnley wharf (of which the visitor centre is a part) was restored in a joint project involving British Waterways. The £1 million project included a bar and restaurant in one of the former warehouses.

In March 1996, Mile Wharf Ltd and British Waterways started work to turn Finsley Wharf into a marina and leisure complex. In 1996 a bid was submitted to the Millennium Fund for a £2.5 million scheme to provide a visual arts centre and public square and to widen the canal to provide extra moorings, it included reconstruction of the clock at Clock Tower Mill.

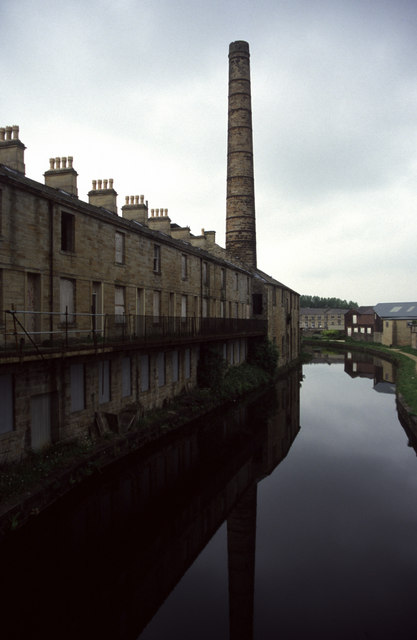
Slater Terrace

In 1998 Liverpool-based Millview Developments purchased Sandygate Mill as part of a plan to turn Slater Terrace weavers' cottages into a luxury canalside hotel. The scheme collapsed in 1999, when Millview could not find an interested buyer. In June 1999 a fire gutted the upper floors of Sandygate Mill.

In 1999, after three years in the planning stages, work started to restore the former Proctors' Iron Works in Hammerton Street, between the town centre and the triangle area. It was hoped that a nightclub and hotel complex and street improvements would encourage future investment on the canal side. The project received funding from the ERDF and English Heritage, and the nightclub component proved successful.

=== 2000s ===
In May 2001, a deal was announced between British Waterways and Nelson-based NEL Construction to redevelop Finsley Wharf. The £1.2 million project would include office space and a canal side pub and restaurant. In early 2002 Millview offered its property in the area for sale, alongside Victoria Mill which was already on the market. A structural survey showed Clock Tower Mill to be in a dangerous condition. Demolition was the only viable option and was completed in January 2004. In February Globe Works was demolished.

In April 2004, Birmingham-based St. Modwen Properties purchased Healey Royd and Finsley Gate Mills. In May, Rossendale-based Hurstwood Developments purchased the Millview properties and began work on a new plan for the area and acquired Victoria Mill. In April 2005, Amberfell Estates received outline planning permission to demolish part of Thorneybank Mill in Nelson Square, with a view to building 24 homes. In March 2006 it was announced that a £260 million master plan for redevelopment of the whole area, had been drawn up to attract developers to the project.

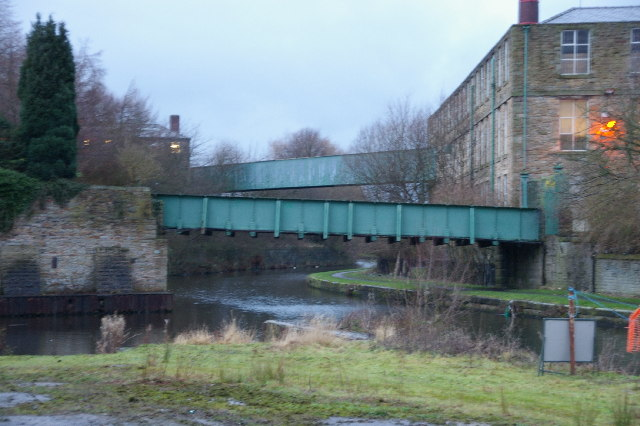
Healey Royd and Finsley Gate Mills, Finsley wharf

At the end of the month, St. Modwen released a plan for a £10m redevelopment of their site. Under this plan Healey Royd Mill and the surrounding land would be used for housing and Finsley Gate would be converted into a business space complex. On a related visit to the town, English Heritage Chief Executive Dr Simon Thurley announced the appointment of two new specialist advisors to the project. Towards the end of the year Hurstwood submitted £50 million plans for properties on the site, including an 800 capacity music venue, restaurants, offices and homes. In April 2007, a fire (believed to be arson) destroyed a section of the roof of George Street Mill. In September, plans were released by the Elevate to redevelop the Victoria Mill complex. Based on the "Fashion Tower" concept suggested by Tony Wilson and his partner, 'Weave' was envisaged as a mixture of textile museum and designer fashion centre. A month later Hurstwood placed all its properties on the market. At the start of 2008, Hurstwood were persuaded to return and submitted revised plans. They stressed the urgent need to begin construction. Approximately £5 million of National Lottery and NWDA funding was secured for complementary heritage projects in the triangle. In February, on a visit to Burnley, Prince Charles travelled along the canal to inspect the state of the mills. In April Accrington-based Valegate submitted plans to redevelop the George Street Mill site including the demolition and rebuilding of much of the mill, with additional buildings to create a 167 unit apartment and shopping complex.

Due to the 2008 financial crisis, over the summer, three of Hurstwood's property arms collapsed into administration. In October it was announced that due to the financial climate the project was to be suspended for at least 2 years.

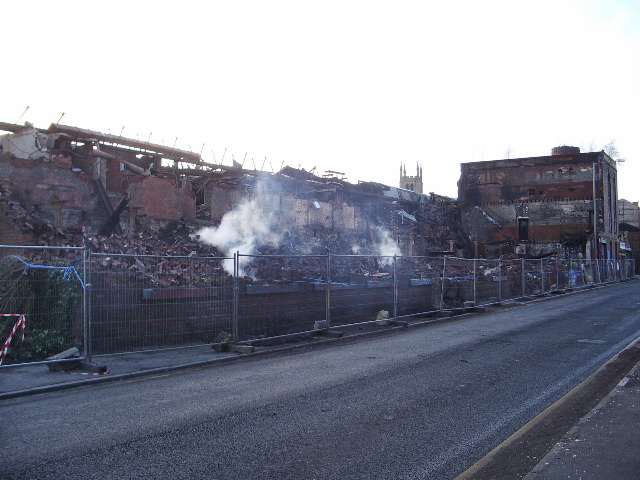
Woodfield Mill following the fire of 2008

In November, a large part of Woodfield Mill (next to Victoria Mill) was demolished after a fire that destroyed the three-storey warehouse. In January 2009, former chairman of English Heritage, Sir Neil Cossons was appointed to chair the steering group responsible for reinvigorating the site. At the start of April a £4.9m NWDA grant enabled Burnley Council to purchase Hurstwood's sites and the neighbouring premises of Dexter paints. Later that month, £65,000 was requested to save the former Neptune Pub. The 200-year-old, three-storey building is believed to be the oldest remaining structure in the area. Despite failing to secure planning permission the previous year, Valegate opted to proceed with the demolition of George Street Mill and submitted updated plans in May, which were again rejected. In June, St. Modwen decided to demolish Finsley Gate and Healey Royd mills. In September, repair work, funded by Burnley Council and NWDA, began on Victoria Mill and the Neptune Building.

=== 2010s ===
In July 2014, a new canal footbridge was lowered into place at the heart of the Weavers' Triangle 'On the Banks' development. The 50 ton Sandygate canal footbridge spans the Leeds and Liverpool Canal, off Trafalgar Street. The canal footbridge opened to the public in December 2014.
