= Brooks & Doxey =

British textile machinery manufacturer

Brooks and Doxey
- Company type: Limited
- Industry: Textile machinery
- Founded: 1859/1920
- Headquarters: West Gorton, Manchester, UK
- Products: Preparation and Spinning machines for Cotton and Worsted

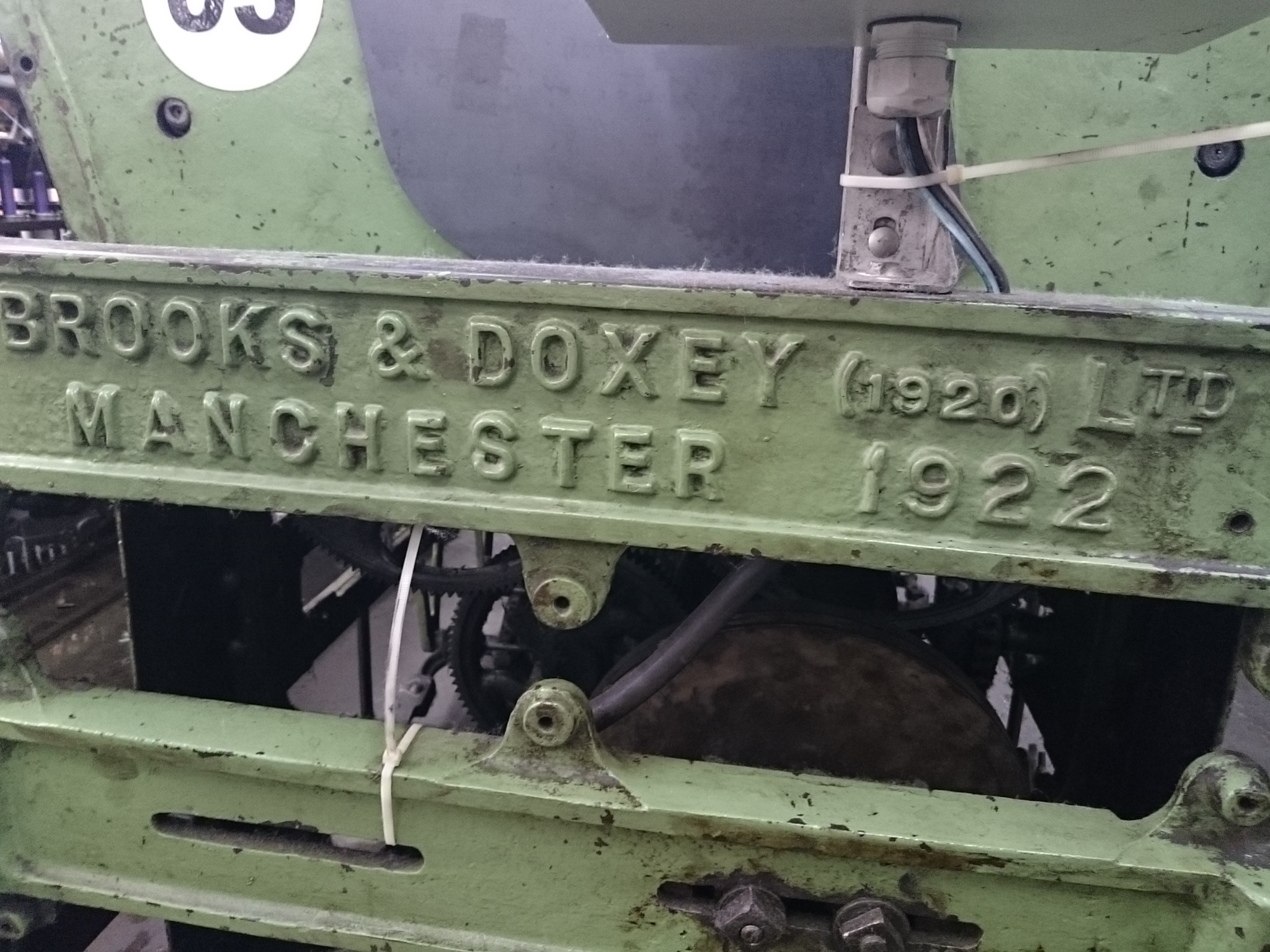
Brooks & Doxey

Brooks & Doxey was a textile machinery manufacturer from West Gorton, Manchester in England. It was founded in 1859. It was incorporated in 1920. The company used the Union Iron Works, West Gorton. The company also had a factory in Stockport. Ferranti bought the old Union Iron Works to make mainframe computers in 1956. It later became ICT ('International' Computers & Tabulators), then ICL. ICT grafted a ‘modern’ entrance on but kept the works.

== History ==
The company made the full range of preparation and spinning machinery. In the 1920s it acquired Lord Bros. of Todmorden.

In the recession of the 1930s, Platt Brothers, Howard and Bullough, Brooks and Doxey, Asa Lees, Dobson and Barlow, Joseph Hibbert, John Hetherington and Tweedales and Smalley merged to become Textile Machinery Makers Ltd., but the individual units continued to trade under their own names until the 1970, when they were rationalised into one company called Platt UK Ltd. In 1991 the company name changed to Platt Saco Lowell.
