= Listed buildings in Coppull =

Coppull is a civil parish in the Borough of Chorley, Lancashire, England. It contains nine buildings that are recorded in the National Heritage List for England as designated listed buildings, all of which are listed at Grade II. This grade is the lowest of the three gradings given to listed buildings and is applied to "buildings of national importance and special interest". The parish contains the village of Coppull and surrounding farmland. Six of the listed buildings are, or originated as, farmhouses or farm buildings. The others are a former cotton spinning mill, its office, and the parish church of St John the Divine.

== Buildings ==
Name and location	Photograph	Date	Notes
Coppull Hall; 53.61766°N 2.63672°W	—	1631	A brick farmhouse, mainly rendered, on a stone plinth with stone dressings and a stone-slate roof. It has two storeys and an L-shaped plan with two two-bay ranges. At the front is a projecting gable and a left wing. The doorway has a semicircular arch and a moulded hood mould. The windows are 19th-century sashes. Inside are back-to-back inglenook fireplaces with bressumers, and there is evidence of timber-framing.
Coppull Old Hall; 53.62003°N 2.64583°W	—	17th century	A brick farmhouse on a stone plinth, with the front roof in slate and the rear roof in stone-slate. It has three bays, the first two bays with two storeys, and the third bay with one. The doorway has a modern gabled porch. There are two blocked mullioned windows; the other windows have altered glazing. Internally there is evidence of timber-framing.
Bogburn Hall; 53.60650°N 2.66560°W	—	1663	A brick farmhouse on a stone plinth with stone quoins, partly rendered, and a stone-slate roof. It has two storeys, a symmetrical two-bay front, and a gabled 2 1/2-storey extension to the rear. In the centre of the front is a two-storey porch containing stone benches, and above it is a datestone. Some of the windows are sliding-sashes, and others have been altered. Inside are back-to-back inglenook fireplaces with bressumers, and timber-framed internal walls.
Barn, Bogburn Hall; 53.60653°N 2.66524°W	—	Late 17th or early 18th century	The barn is in sandstone and some brick with a stone-slate roof. It has a rectangular plan with four bays, an attached stable at the left end, and an outshut in front of the first bay. It contains opposing wagon entrances and other openings.
Chisnall Hall Farmhouse; 53.60786°N 2.69732°W	—	Early 18th century	The farmhouse stands on a moated site, and probably incorporates earlier material. It is in sandstone with a concrete tiled roof, and has two storeys with an attic and three bays. The front is symmetrical containing a central round-headed doorcase with a fanlight and sash windows. At the rear is a single-storey lean-to and mullioned and transomed windows.
Barn, Grange Farm; 53.60675°N 2.67666°W	—	1739	A sandstone barn with a stone-slate roof in five bays. It contains ventilations slits, lofts in the first two bays, and a loading door in the upper part of the first bay. In the third bay are opposing wagon entrances. There is a datestone in the left gable end.
Coppull Ring Mill; 53.62735°N 2.66155°W		1906	A former cotton spinning mill, later used as an enterprise centre. It is in red and yellow brick with yellow terracotta dressings. The building has a large rectangular plan, the main block having three storeys with a basement and 38 bays. There is a two-storey range and a two-storey engine house on the west side, a five stage water tower on the east side, and three turrets on the north side. The tower has terracotta battlements on the fourth stage, above which is an octagonal belvedere with a copper dome.
Red Herring, former office to Coppull Ring Mill; 53.62675°N 2.66103°W		1906	The former office to the mill is built in red and yellow brick. It is in two storeys and has three bays on each front, with a canted northeast corner. Between the bays are square pilasters rising to a greater height than the eaves.
Church of St John the Divine; 53.62275°N 2.66613°W		1911	The church was designed by Dudley Newman, with Decorated and Perpendicular features. It is in stone and has a green slate roof. The plan consists of a nave with a clerestory, aisles, a south porch, a chancel with a south vestry, and a west tower. The tower is in three stages, with buttresses, a west doorway and window, a polygonal southwest stair turret, and gargoyles. The parapets of the tower, stair turret, nave, and chancel are battlemented.
