= Joseph Hibbert (manufacturer) =

UK textile machinery manufacturer

- Type: Limited
- Industry: Textile machinery
- Founded: before 1851
- Headquarters: Darwen, Lancashire, UK
- Products: Sizing equipment, brass and copper work.

Joseph Hibbert was a textile machinery manufacturer from Darwen, Lancashire in UK. The Iron, Brass and Copper Works was in Bridge Street.

== History ==
Joseph Hibbert was a brass founder and maker of gauges and taps. These skills were used to produce heald sizing equipment, including the Shirley box sizer under licence, an essential part of the weaving process for cotton in which the warp is stiffened before weaving.

In the recession of the 1930s, Platt Brothers, Howard and Bullough, Brooks and Doxey, Asa Lees, Dobson and Barlow, Joseph Hibbert, John Hetherington and Tweedales and Smalley merged to become Textile Machinery Makers Ltd., but the individual units continued to trade under their own names until the 1970, when they were merged into a single company called Platt UK Ltd. In 1991 the company name changed to Platt Saco Lowell.
