= Wigan Pier =

Area around the Leeds and Liverpool Canal in Wigan, Greater Manchester, England

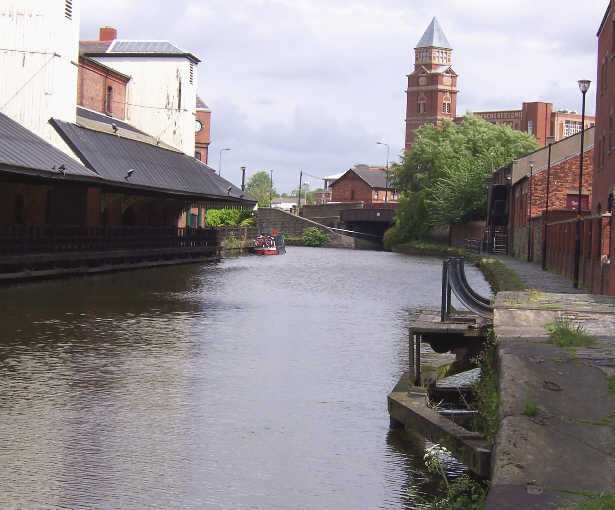
- On the right, the reconstructed Wigan pier
- Spans: Leeds and Liverpool Canal
- Location: Wigan
- Coordinates: 53°32′28″N 2°38′19″W

Characteristics
- Longest span: N/A

History
- Demolition date: 1929

Wigan Pier is an area around the Leeds and Liverpool Canal in Wigan, Greater Manchester, England, south-west of the town centre. The name has humorous or ironic connotations since it conjures an image of a seaside pleasure pier, whereas Wigan is inland and a traditionally industrial town.

== History ==
The original "pier" at Wigan was a coal loading staithe, probably a wooden jetty, where wagons from a nearby colliery were unloaded into waiting barges on the canal. The original wooden pier is believed to have been demolished in 1929, with the iron from the tippler (a mechanism for tipping coal into the barges) being sold as scrap.

One account of the origin 'Wigan Pier' dates to 1891, when a Southport excursion train was stopped at signals soon after leaving Wallgate Station. Close by stood a long wooden gantry carrying a mineral line between Lamb and Moore's collieries. The structure was substantial as it spanned the Douglas Valley, over the river, the canal, and the railway line to Southport. During the delay, a passenger reportedly demanded to know where they were, and a joking reply referred to the place as Wigan's 'pier'. The joke spread locally and was popularised on stage around the turn of the 20th century by music hall performer George Formby Sr., who quipped that whenever he passed the pier the tide was in, a dig at the area's regular flooding. Formby died in February 1921, and as the surrounding collieries eventually closed, the original gantry disappeared. Later, when people went looking for the so-called pier, the coal tippler used for loading wagons at the canal basin became the object people pointed to, keeping the joke alive. The tippler became the favoured location when people subsequently wanted to see it. There are references to it in songs such as George Formby Junior's On the Wigan Boat Express. "The Ballad of Wigan Pier", written by local journalist Jack Winstanley, is a comic song written in the 1980s in the style of George Formby Junior. It was recorded by The Houghton Weavers and was regularly performed by them. Its lyrics perpetuate the idea of Wigan having a pier in the style of seaside resorts like Blackpool, and encourage you to look for it. References also include a mythical visit by Her Majesty Queen Elizabeth II, fishing for tripe using locally produced sweets Uncle Joe's Mint Balls and refer also to George Formby Senior as the origin of its mythical existence.

In 1937, Wigan was featured in the title of George Orwell's The Road to Wigan Pier, which dealt in large part with the living conditions of England's working poor. In response to a critic, Orwell insisted "He [Orwell] liked Wigan very much—the people, not the scenery. Indeed, he has only one fault to find with it, and that is in respect of the celebrated Wigan Pier, which he had set his heart on seeing. Alas! Wigan Pier had been demolished, and even the spot where it used to stand is no longer certain." Orwell did say that to estimate from photographs it may have been around 20 ft long. Some have embraced the Orwellian link, as it has provided the area with a modest tourist base over the years. "It seems funny to celebrate Orwell for highlighting all our bad points, but Wigan wouldn't be anywhere near as famous without him," said the Wigan Pier Experience's manager, Carole Tyldesley. "In the end George Orwell has proved to be a strong marketing tool." Others regard this connection as disappointing, considering it an insinuation that Wigan is no better now than it was at the time of Orwell's writing.

The canal scene from The Road to Wigan Pier describes the area as such: "I remember a winter afternoon in the dreadful environs of Wigan. All round was the lunar landscape of slag-heaps, and to the north, through the passes, as it were, between the mountains of slag, you could see the factory chimneys sending out their plumes of smoke. The canal path was a mixture of cinders and frozen mud, criss-crossed by the imprints of innumerable clogs, and all round, as far as the slag-heaps in the distance, stretched the 'flashes'—pools of stagnant water that had seeped into the hollows caused by the subsidence of ancient pits. It was horribly cold. The 'flashes' were covered with ice the colour of raw umber, the bargemen were muffled to the eyes in sacks, the lock gates wore beards of ice. It seemed a world from which vegetation had been banished; nothing existed except smoke, shale, ice, mud, ashes, and foul water."

Today, the slag heaps have been removed or landscaped with trees, the factories are closed or converted to housing, and the canal is only used for recreational boating and fishing.

== Existing buildings ==
The pier was at the end of a narrow gauge tramway from a colliery. The wagons would be brought right to the edge of the canal to be tipped so that their contents went straight into the waiting barges. The original wooden pier is believed to have been demolished in 1929, with the iron from the tippler being sold as scrap. Because of the more recent pride in the area's heritage, a replica tippler, consisting of two curved rails, has been erected at the original location.

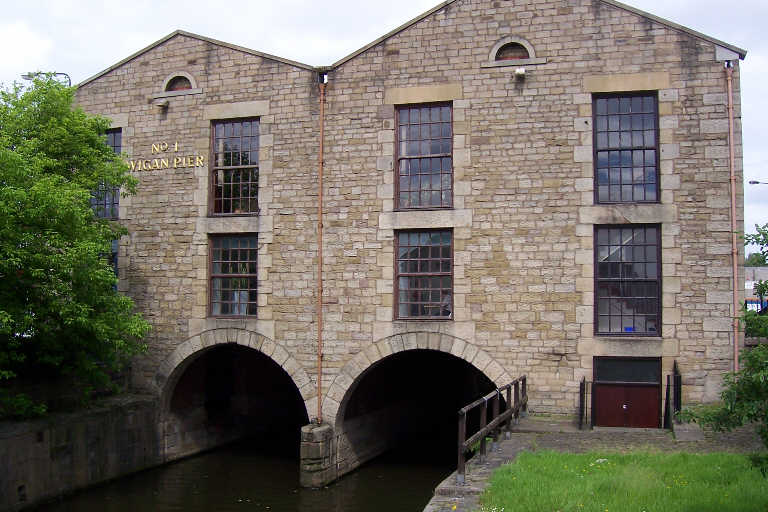
The original terminus of the canal, completed 1777

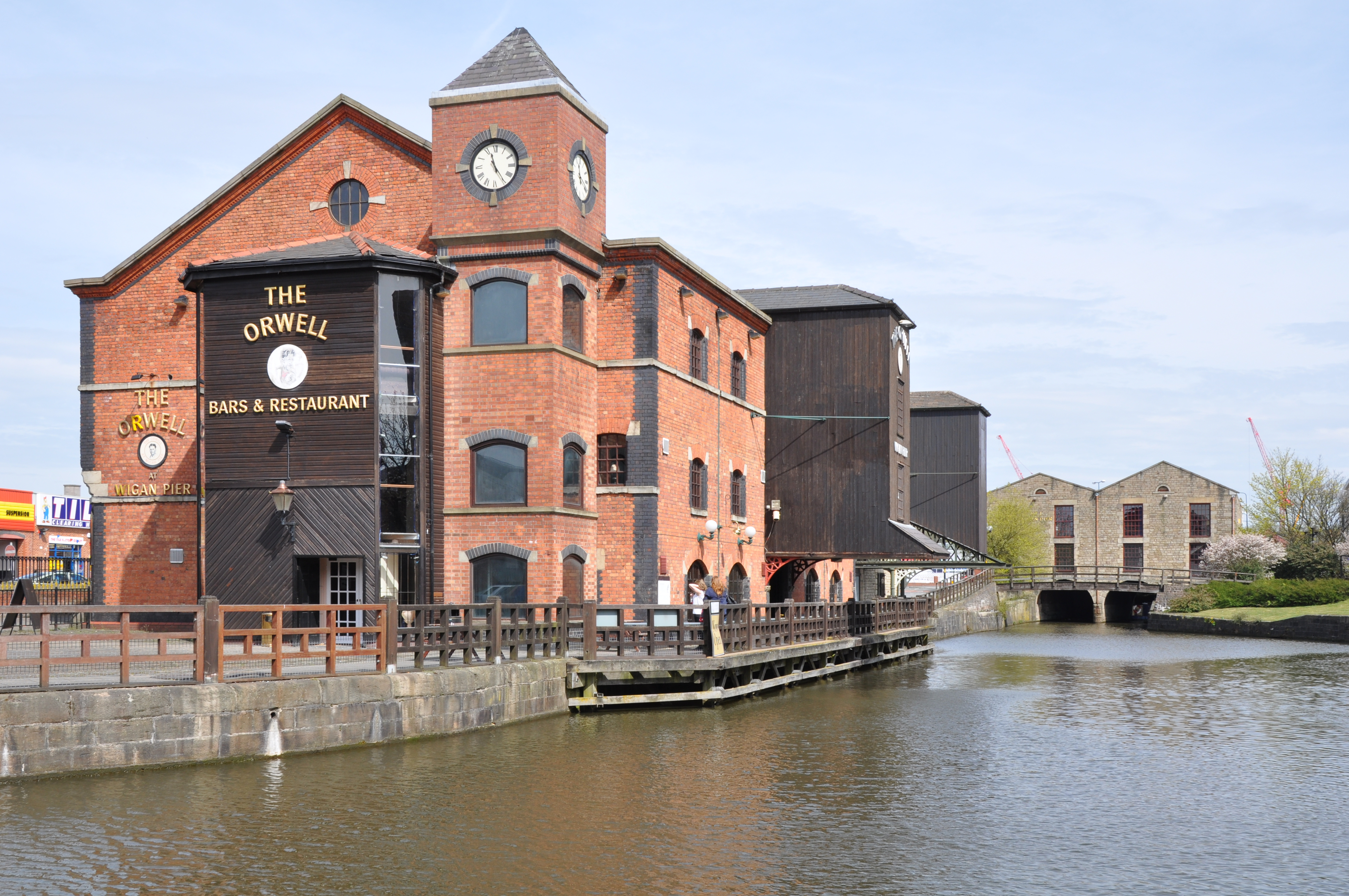
Gibson's Warehouse was built in 1777 and is now The Orwell at Wigan Pier

The former Wigan Terminus Warehouses were built in the eighteenth century and refurbished in the 1980s. Boats could moor inside the building and offload directly into the warehouse.

A warehouse with covered loading bays, converted into a museum of Victorian life (often mistakenly thought to be Wigan Pier), and the home to The Way We Were museum, was part of the Wigan Pier Experience museum and exhibition centre. The exhibition featured a Victorian school room, a colliery disaster, the Second Boer War and (on the top floor) a complete pub transported from Hope Street and reconstructed by shopping centre developers. The Wigan Pier Theatre Company used these displays to remind present generations of "The Way We Were"—not always a happy life. The attraction closed on 20 December 2007.

Gibson's Warehouse is a Victorian cotton warehouse, originally built in 1777, re-built in 1984 as The Orwell at Wigan Pier, is situated on the canalside. The pub closed in 2016.

Number 1 Wigan Pier, won a Civic Trust Award—the architect being Michael Stroud Churchward when it refurbished in the early part of the 1980s.

Trencherfield Mill is a former cotton mill, located across the road from Wigan Pier converted into apartments in 2009. It still contains a massive working 2,500-horsepower steam engine.

There are several bridges across the canal. Bridge #51 Pottery Changeline is a roving bridge, one which swaps the tow path from one side of the canal to the other, usually in such a way as to allow the horse pulling the barge to pass easily and without disconnecting its tow-rope. Bridge #50 Seven Stars Bridge is adjacent to the Seven Stars public house (now demolished), taking its name from The Plough constellation.

Elizabeth House, at The Pier, Wigan, houses Keep Britain Tidy, an environmental charity.

== Future ==
A planning application proposing the overhaul of the famous Wigan Pier to provide new homes, an artisan food hall and event spaces was approved in 2019. The Wigan Pier scheme spans approximately 55,000 square feet (5,100 m^{2}) and is a mixed-use development. In 2025, the Council announced plans for events to take place at Wigan Pier while redevelopment continues. The activities are intended to bring the site back into use, with further discussions underway with potential tenants as part of efforts to turn the area into a cultural destination.
