= Trencherfield Mill =

Cotton mill in Greater Manchester, England

- Trencherfield mill before 1951

- Location in Greater Manchester

Spinning (ring mill)
- Location: Wigan Pier, Wigan, Greater Manchester, England
- Serving canal: Leeds and Liverpool Canal
- Further ownership: Lancashire Cotton Corporation (1930s); Courtaulds (1964)
- Coordinates: 53.5411°N 2.6378°W

Construction
- Completed: 1907

Power
- Date: 1907
- Engine maker: J & E Wood
- Decommissioned: Still in steam
- Engine type: triple-expansion four-cylinder engine
- Valve Gear: Corliss valves
- Cylinder diameter and throw: 25"HP, 40"IP, two 44"LP X 5ft
- rpm: 68
- Installed horse power (ihp): 2500
- Flywheel diameter: 26ft
- Transmission type: ropes
- No. of ropes: 54

Trencherfield Mill is a cotton spinning mill standing next to the Leeds and Liverpool Canal in Wigan, Greater Manchester, England. It was built in 1907. It was taken over by the Lancashire Cotton Corporation in the 1930s and passed to Courtaulds in 1964. The mill was driven by a 2,500 hp triple-expansion four-cylinder engine built by J & E Wood of Bolton in 1907. The two halves of the engine were called Rina and Helen. They drove a 26-foot flywheel with 54 ropes at 68 rpm. The engine was stopped in 1968. The mill is now part of the Wigan Pier redevelopment area and is used for other purposes.

== Location ==
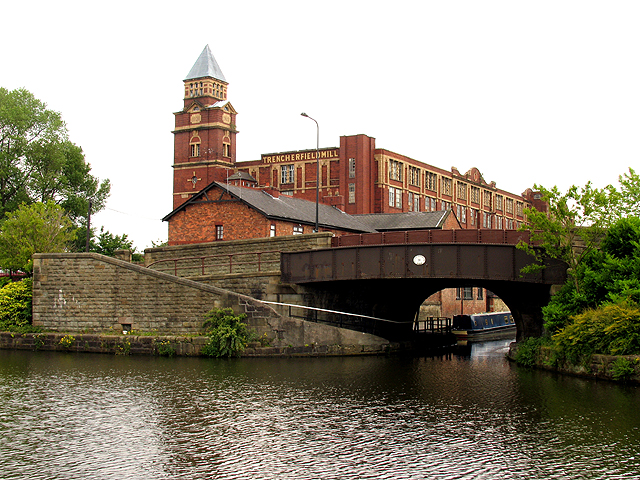
Trencherfield Mill, modified and now part residential

Wigan is a town in Greater Manchester, England. It stands on the River Douglas which was canalised in the 1740s; 15 miles (24 km) south of Preston, 16 1/2 miles (27 km) west-northwest of Manchester, and 17 1/2 miles (28 km) east-northeast of Liverpool. Wigan is the largest settlement in the Metropolitan Borough of Wigan and is its administrative centre. Wigan is served by the Leeds and Liverpool Canal, the London and North Western Railway and the Lancashire and Yorkshire Railway. Trencherfield Mill stands by Wigan Pier, a wharf on the Leeds and Liverpool Canal, which was made famous by the writer George Orwell in his book, The Road to Wigan Pier. Orwell highlighted the poor working and living conditions of the local inhabitants during the 1930s.

== History ==
Historically a part of Lancashire; during the Industrial Revolution Wigan experienced dramatic economic expansion and a rapid rise in the population. Although porcelain manufacture and clock making had been major industries in the town, Wigan has since become known as a major mill town and coal mining district. The first coal mine was established at Wigan in 1450 and at its peak there were 1,000 pit shafts within 5 miles (8 km) of the town centre. Mining was so extensive that one of its town councillors once remarked that "a coal mine in the backyard was not uncommon in Wigan". Coal mining ceased during the latter part of the 20th century. In 1974, Wigan became a part of Greater Manchester.

Wigan's status as a centre for coal production, engineering and textiles in the 18th century led to the Douglas Navigation in the 1740s, the canalisation of part of the River Douglas, and later the diversion of the Leeds and Liverpool Canal in the 1790s at the request of the mill owners, to transport coal from the Lancashire coal pits to Wigan's mills and was also used extensively to transport local produce. As a mill town, Wigan was an important centre of textile manufacture during the Industrial Revolution; however it wasn't until the 1800s that cotton factories began to spread into the town. This was due to a dearth of fast-flowing streams and rivers in the area, but by 1818 there were eight cotton mills in the Wallgate part of Wigan. In 1818, William Woods introduced the first power looms to the Wigan cotton mills.

Trencherfield Mill was built alongside the canal in 1907, for William Woods & Sons Ltd.

The industry peaked in 1912 when it produced 8 billion yards of cloth. The Great War of 1914–18 halted the supply of raw cotton, and the British government encouraged its colonies to build mills to spin and weave cotton. Once the war was over, Lancashire never regained its markets. The independent mills were struggling, and the Bank of England set up the Lancashire Cotton Corporation in 1929 to attempt to rationalise and save the industry. Trencherfield Mill was one of 104 mills bought by the LCC, and one of the 53 mills that survived through to 1950.

The mill was closed in 1968 with a loss of 350 jobs. Wigan Council took over the operation of the mill's engine, after a significant restoration, in 1984 as part of the Wigan Pier redevelopment. The engine was visited by Queen Elizabeth II in March 1986 as part of the official opening ceremony for the "Way We Were" heritage complex at Wigan Pier.

The semi-derelict Grade II listed building was renovated between 2005 and 2007 as a key part of the Wigan Pier regeneration project, co-ordinated by Simon Kensdale. This project drew on a combination of European Regional Development Fund, Single Regeneration Budget and Heritage Lottery monies and it resulted in a number of sites in the Pier Quarter being restored to use. Trencherfield Mill itself became a mixed development comprising commercial, retail, and leisure space and 52 one and two-bedroom apartments. Wigan Council ultimately decided against establishing an arts centre – which would have included the town's first public theatre – within the Mill complex. However, the mill's 2,500 horsepower steam engine was preserved and restored. As of 2022, it can be seen in steam each on selected dates during the year.

Trencherfield Mill was home to The Mill at the Pier arts venue and performing space, was opened around 1983, and became the host for the Wigan International Jazz Festival in July 1986. It closed around 2005 but was later re-opened as part of ALRA. The prestigious British drama school ALRA North, the Academy of Live and Recorded Arts, operated in the mill from 2012 until its closure in 2022. The mill is also used as a call centre for both EE and BT.

== Architecture ==
The first Trencherfield Mill was built in 1822–23 by William Woods. The site housed the first power looms in the town, and a second mill was added to the site in 1851–2. The present building was the third mill on the site, which dates from 1907. It was the largest mill constructed in Wigan at the time and the last mill in Wigan to be constructed with access to the canal. It had four storeys and a basement; it was 31 by 6 bays. The chimney is circular. The design of the tower, built near an offshoot of the Leeds Liverpool canal at Wigan Pier, was influenced by the construction of St Mark's Campanile in Venice, which inspired a number of similar towers around the world.

== Power ==
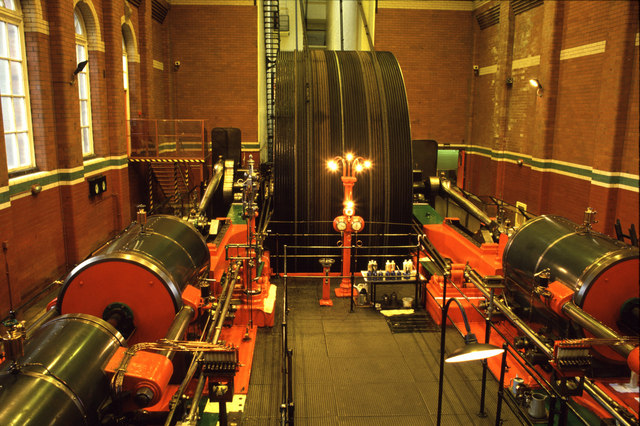
Mill engine

The mill was driven by a 2,500 hp triple-expansion four-cylinder steam engine by J & E Wood of Bolton built in 1907. The two halves of the engine are called Rina and Helen. They drive a 26-foot flywheel with 54 ropes at 68 rpm. The HP cylinders are steamed at 200psi. As a four-cylinder engine, it has two 44"LPs, a 40"IP, and 25"HP with a 5-foot stroke and has Corliss valves on all cylinders, Dobson block motion on HP and IP. The air pump is driven from each crosshead. It has a Lumb governor.

The steam engine has been restored and operates as a visitor attraction. Engineers provide visitor tours on selected dates during the year.

== Owners ==
- Lancashire Cotton Corporation (1930s–1964)
- Courtaulds (1964–1968)

== See also ==
- Listed buildings in Wigan
- Textile manufacturing

== Bibliography ==
- Ashmore, Owen (1982). The industrial archaeology of North-west England. Manchester University Press. ISBN 0-7190-0820-4.
- Dunkerley, Philip (2009). "Dunkerley-Tuson Family Website, The Regent Cotton Mill, Failsworth". Archived from the original on 23 March 2008.
- Frangopulo, N. J. (1977). Tradition in Action: The Historical Evolution of the Greater Manchester County. Wakefield: EP Publishing. ISBN 978-0-7158-1203-7.
- LCC (1951). The mills and organisation of the Lancashire Cotton Corporation Limited. Blackfriars House, Manchester: Lancashire Cotton Corporation Limited.
- McNeil, R.; Nevell, M. (2000). A Guide to the Industrial Archaeology of Greater Manchester. Association for Industrial Archaeology. ISBN 978-0-9528930-3-5.
- Roberts, A S (1921). "Arthur Robert's Engine List". Arthur Roberts Black Book. One guy from Barlick-Book Transcription. Archived from the original on 23 July 2011.
