= Albion Mill, Ancoats =

Former industrial building in Manchester, England

Coordinates: 53.4803°N 2.22015°W

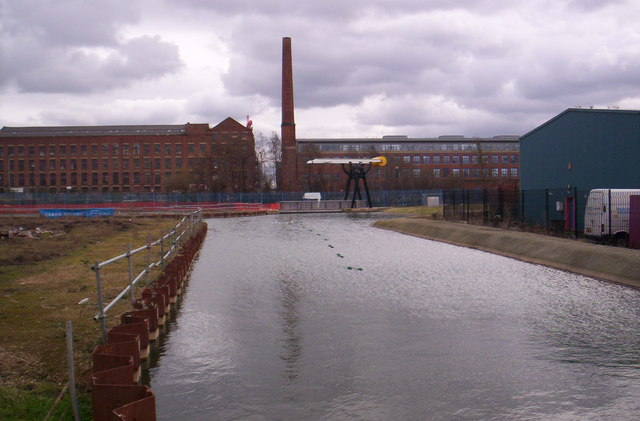
Albion Mill and Vulcan Works on Pollard Street

Albion Mill is a former industrial building in Manchester, United Kingdom. It occupies the site of a former cotton mill and ironworks.

John Hetherington & Sons made textile machinery in Ancoats. The company was founded in 1830 and as it expanded acquired the site of J. and J. L. Gray's Ancoats Mill, and other works on Pollard Street where around 1856 it established the Vulcan Works. The company moved to the Union Iron Works at West Gorton in 1939 as demand for its products declined. The Vulcan Works were used as business premises until 2004, when it was converted into flats as Albion Mill and Vulcan Mill. Today the mills have been converted into flats and offices.
