= Mavis Mill =

Cotton mill in Lancashire, England

- The mill before 1951

- Location in Chorley Location in Lancashire

Spinning (ring mill)
- Location: Coppull, Chorley, Lancashire, England
- Serving railway: North Union Railway
- Owner: Coppull Ring Spinning Co
- Further ownership: Lancashire Cotton Corporation (1941); Courtaulds (1964)
- Coordinates: 53.6272°N 2.6628°W

Power
- Date: 1909
- Engine maker: J & E Wood
- Engine type: triple-expansion four-cylinder engine
- Valve Gear: Corliss valves
- Cylinder diameter and throw: 21"HP, 33"IP and two 37"LP X 6ft stroke
- rpm: 69
- Installed horse power (ihp): 2000hp
- Flywheel diameter: 26ft
- Transmission type: rope
- No. of ropes: 36

Boiler configuration
- Pressure: 200psi

Mavis Mill was a cotton spinning mill in Coppull, Chorley, Lancashire

Mavis Mill was built in 1908 alongside the Coppull Ring Mill, which still survives under a change of use to an enterprise centre. The mill was taken over by the Lancashire Cotton Corporation in 1941, but was subsequently demolished to make a car park. The spinning machines were driven by a 2000 hp triple-expansion four-cylinder engine by J & E Wood, 1909, which had a 26 ft flywheel with 36 ropes.

== Location ==
Coppull is a village and civil parish in Lancashire, England. It is part of the borough of Chorley, lies around 300 feet (91 m) above sea level and has a population of around 7,600. It is bounded by Whittle Brook, Clancutt Brook, the River Yarrow, Eller Brook, Hic-Bibi Brook and Stars Brook. Coppull is located between Chorley and Wigan, to the east of the A49 road near Charnock Richard. The village was 6 km from the Leeds and Liverpool Canal but was served from 1834 by the North Union Railway.

== History ==
Coppull expanded greatly along with the rest of Lancashire during the Industrial Revolution of the 18th century. As well as the Cotton industry the town is situated on the Lancashire Coal Field. There were several major collieries located in the town during this era with notable collieries being Chisnall Hall and Ellerbeck. Mavis Mill, Coppull was built in 1906, with elaborate decoration. It was used to spin 10's to 24's counts for general manufacture.

The industry peaked in 1912 when it produced 8 billion yards of cloth. The great war of 1914- 1918 halted the supply of raw cotton, and the British government encouraged its colonies to build mills to spin and weave cotton. The war over, Lancashire never regained its markets. The independent mills were struggling. The Bank of England set up the Lancashire Cotton Corporation in 1929 to attempt to rationalise and save the industry. Mavis Mill, Coppull was one of 104 mills bought by the LCC, and one of the 53 mills that survived through to 1950.

== Architecture ==
=== Power ===
Driven by a 2000 hp triple-expansion four-cylinder engine by J & E Wood, 1909. At 69 rpm, it had a 26 ft flywheel running 36 ropes. It was steamed at 200psi. Its cylinders, 21"HP, 33"IP and two 37"LP had a 6 ft stroke.

== Owners ==
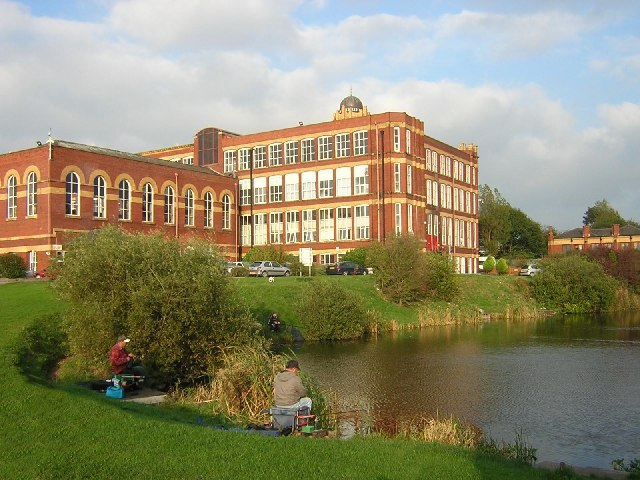
Now the Coppull Enterprise Centre

- Coppull Ring Spinning Co
- Lancashire Cotton Corporation (1941-1964)
- Courtaulds (1964-)

== See also ==
- Textile manufacturing

== Bibliography ==
- Dunkerley, Philip (2009). "Dunkerley-Tuson Family Website, The Regent Cotton Mill, Failsworth". Archived from the original on 23 March 2008.
- LCC (1951). The mills and organisation of the Lancashire Cotton Corporation Limited. Blackfriars House, Manchester: Lancashire Cotton Corporation Limited.
- Roberts, A S (1921), "Arthur Robert's Engine List", Arthur Roberts Black Book., One guy from Barlick-Book Transcription, archived from the original on 23 July 2011
