= On the Wigan Boat Express =

1940 English comic song

Single by George Formby
- A-side: "Down the Old Coal Hole"
- Released: 1940
- Recorded: August 4, 1940
- Genre: Comic song
- Length: 3:28
- Label: Regal Zonophone
- Songwriters: George Formby, Harry Gifford, Frederick E. Cliffe

"On the Wigan Boat Express" is a comic song written by George Formby, Harry Gifford and Frederick E. Cliffe. Formby recorded it on 4 August 1940 for Regal Zonophone Records. It tells the story of, and goings-on aboard, a boat train express heading for Formby's hometown of Wigan in Lancashire. Like several other of Formby's songs, and indeed comic routines by his father George Formby Snr, it maintains and develops the running joke that Wigan is a seaside town rather than an inland, industrial centre, and like Blackpool, has a “pier” albeit on a canal (the Leeds and Liverpool Canal). It is filled with the sort of sexual innuendo that was a hallmark of Formby's songs.
