= John Hetherington & Sons =

English textile machinery manufacturer

John Hetherington and Sons Ltd
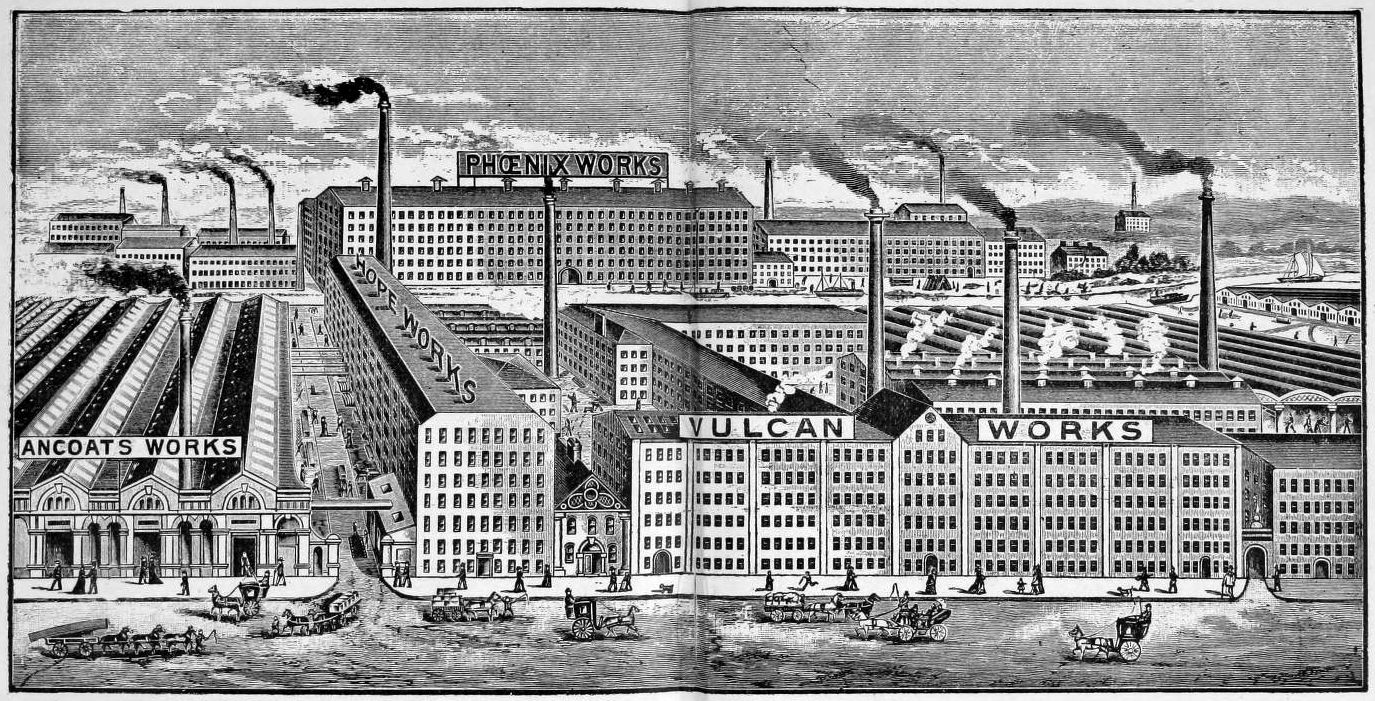
- John Hetherington & Sons, 1896
- Type: Textile machinery
- Founded: 1830
- Headquarters: Vulcan Works, Pollard Street, Ancoats, Manchester, England
- Products: Preparation and Spinning machines for Cotton and Worsted

John Hetherington & Sons was a textile machinery manufacturer from Ancoats, Manchester in England, founded in 1830.

== History ==
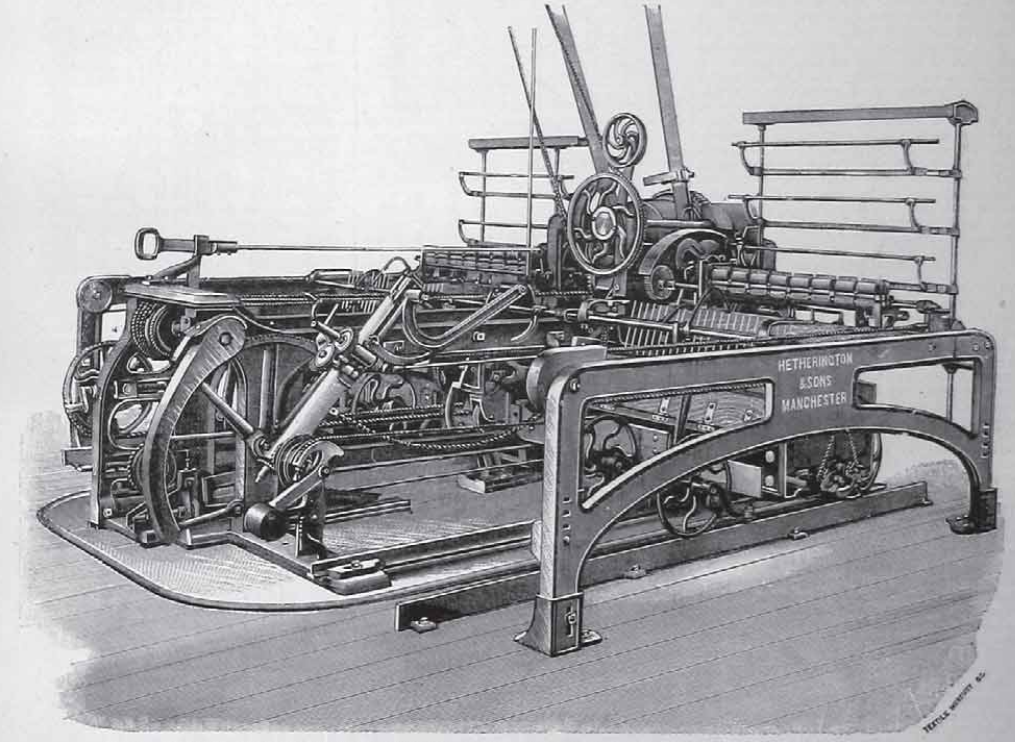
Headstock of a Hetherington designed Spinning Mule 1892

John Hetherington & Sons was founded in 1830. The company gradually expanded and acquired a number of factory buildings in Ancoats. It established the Vulcan Works on Pollard Street in around 1856 and left these buildings in 1939 when the Lancashire cotton industry was in decline.

The company then moved to the Union Iron Works at West Gorton. The Vulcan Works was still used until 2004, when it was sold to a property developer for conversion into flats.

In the recession of the 1930s, Platt Brothers, Howard and Bullough, Brooks & Doxey, Asa Lees, Dobson and Barlow, Joseph Hibbert, John Hetherington and Tweedales and Smalley merged to become Textile Machinery Makers Ltd., but the individual units continued to trade under their own names until 1970, when they were rationalised into one company called Platt UK Ltd. In 1991 the company name changed to Platt Saco Lowell.

== Literature ==
- Richard Marsden: Cotton spinning: its development, principles, and practice. Publisher: George Bell and sons, London 1884
