= Benjamin Alfred Dobson =

English manufacturer and politician

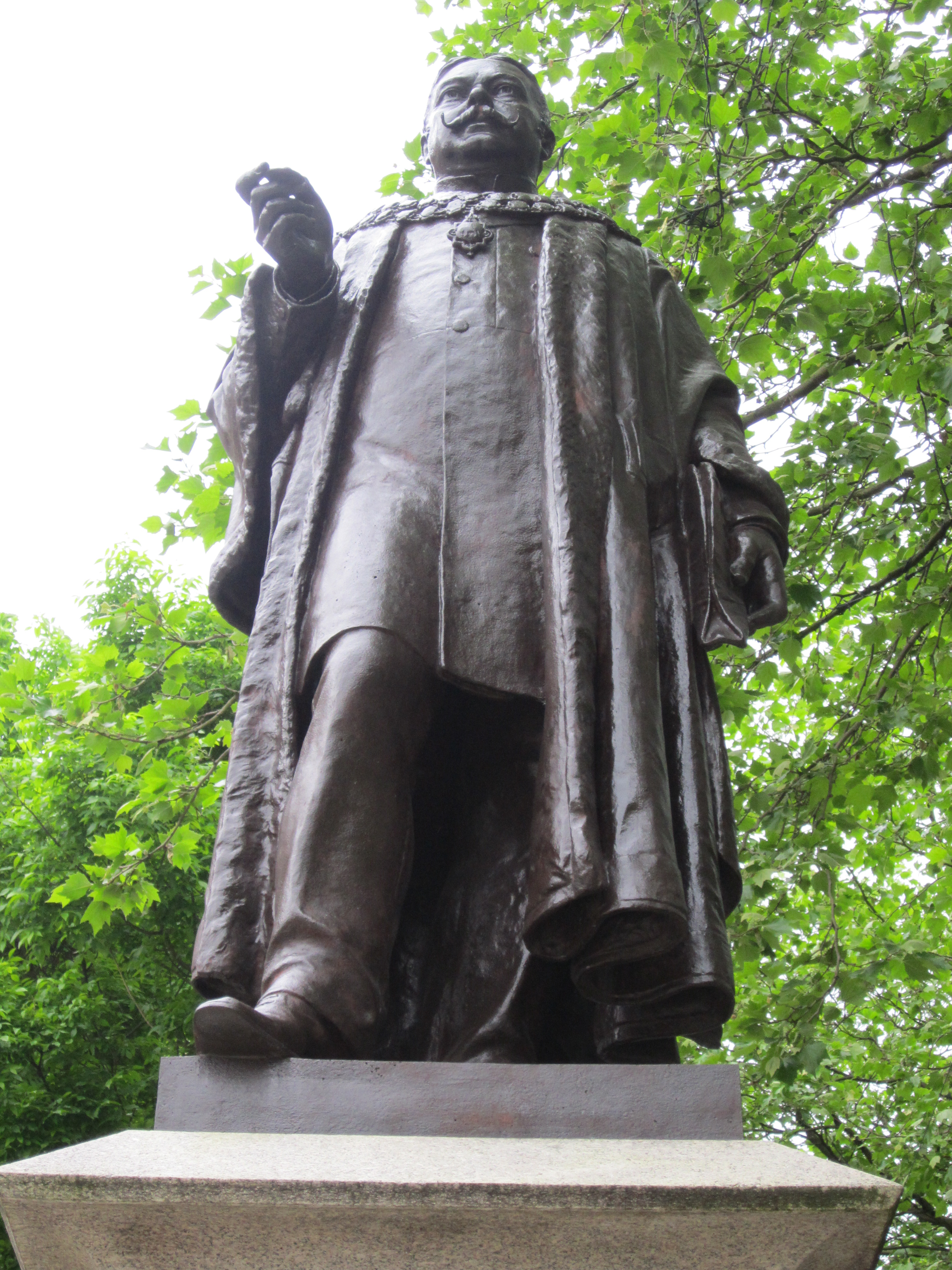
Dobson's statue by Cassidy in central Bolton

Colonel Sir Benjamin Alfred Dobson (27 October 1847 – 4 March 1898) was an English textile machinery manufacturer and mayor of Bolton. He was chairman of Dobson & Barlow, the company co-founded in 1790 by his great-great-uncle Isaac Dobson.

== Early life and family ==
Dobson was born in Douglas, Isle of Man, in 1847. His father Arthur Dobson was from Belfast, but was the great-nephew of Isaac Dobson, founder of Dobson & Barlow.

He was educated at Carlisle Grammar School and the Collegiate Institute, Belfast. His first job was with the Belfast and Northern Counties Railway before he moved to England in 1869 to join Dobson & Barlow.

He married Coralie Palin (1852–1904) who in 1895 became the first woman to wear the official chain and badge as Mayoress of Bolton. They built a house called "Doffcockers" on Chorley Old Road in Bolton; it was named after the hamlet of Doffcocker. When Dobson was knighted in 1897 he threw a garden party for 1,000 guests in its extensive grounds, which accommodated a model railway. The house was demolished in 1913, but the gateposts remained until at least 1938.

Screenwriter Chris Bryant (1936–2008), born Christopher Brian Spencer Dobson, was his great-grandson.

== Career ==
Dobson joined Dobson & Barlow when his uncle Benjamin Dobson (1823–1874) was its chairman, and became a partner on his uncle's retirement in 1871.

He travelled extensively on business, visiting Europe, Egypt, India, Japan, Canada and the United States, and in 1890 went to Constantinople, Turkey, to see the work of the Yedi Koule Cotton Spinning Mills using his firm's machinery.

Dobson took out 22 patents, and wrote works on the textile industry including Humidity in Cotton Spinning (1895), Some difficulties in cotton spinning (1893), Electric Welding (1894) and On the artificial lighting of workshops (1893). He joined the Institution of Mechanical Engineers in 1871 and served on its council 1885 to 1891, and from 1894 until his death.

Dobson was Mayor of Bolton for four years, 1894–1898, dying in office. He also served in the Bolton Rifles (the 2nd Volunteer Battalion of the Loyal North Lancashire Regiment), rising to the rank of Lieutenant colonel and gaining the Volunteer Decoration for 20 years' service as an officer.

Dobson died in 1898, from pneumonia, aged 50. He left an estate of £240,134, and is buried at St Peter's Church, Bolton.

== Honours and legacy ==
Dobson was made a Chevalier of the Légion d'honneur in 1878 "for services to French industry".

He was knighted on 9 August 1897, being described as "of Doffcockers, Heaton, in the Parish of Deane, Co. Lancs, Mayor of Bolton".

A statue of Dobson by John Cassidy stands beside Bolton Town Hall.
