= Coppull Mill =

Cotton mill in Chorley, Lancashire, England

- The mill before 1951

- Location in Chorley

Spinning (ring mill)
- Location: Coppull, Chorley, Lancashire, England
- Owner: Coppull Ring Spinning Co
- Further ownership: Lancashire Cotton Corporation (1941); Courtaulds (1964)
- Coordinates: 53.6271°N 2.6615°W

Power
- Date: 1906
- Engine maker: J & E Wood
- Engine type: triple-expansion four-cylinder engine
- Valve Gear: Corliss valves
- Cylinder diameter and throw: 19 ½"HP, 31"IP, two 34"LP X 5ft
- rpm: 68 rpm
- Installed horse power (ihp): 1600iHP
- Flywheel diameter: 26ft
- Transmission type: rope
- No. of ropes: 36

Boiler configuration
- Pressure: 200psi

Coppull Mill is a former cotton spinning mill in Coppull, Chorley, Lancashire. It was opened in 1906 by the Coppull Ring Spinning Co, followed by its sister mill, Mavis Mill in 1908. Together they employed 700 workers. The mill was taken over by the Lancashire Cotton Corporation in 1941 and passed to Courtaulds in 1964. The building is a Grade II listed building and is now used as an enterprise centre. This was a ring mill. It was driven by a 1600 hp triple-expansion four-cylinder engine by J & E Wood built in 1906. Its 26-foot (7.9 m) flywheel operated at 68 rpm and ran 36 ropes.

== Location ==
Coppull is a village and civil parish in Lancashire, England. It is part of the Borough of Chorley, lies around 300 feet (91 m) above sea level and has a population of around 7,600. It is bounded by Whittle Brook, Clancutt Brook, the River Yarrow, Eller Brook, Hic-Bibi Brook and Stars Brook. Coppull is located between Chorley and Wigan, to the east of the A49 road near Charnock Richard. The village was 6 km from the Leeds and Liverpool Canal but was served from 1834 by the North Union Railway.

== History ==
Coppull expanded greatly along with the rest of Lancashire during the Industrial Revolution of the 18th century. As well as the Cotton industry the town is situated on the Lancashire Coalfield. There were several major collieries located in the town during this era with notable collieries being Chisnall Hall and Ellerbeck. Coppull Mill was built in 1906, with elaborate decoration. It was a ring mill, and was used to spin 10's to 24's counts for general manufacture.

The industry peaked in 1912 when it produced 8 billion yards of cloth. The Great War of 1914–18 halted the supply of raw cotton, and the British government encouraged its colonies to build mills to spin and weave cotton. The war over, Lancashire never regained its markets. The independent mills were struggling. The Bank of England set up the Lancashire Cotton Corporation in 1929 to attempt to rationalise and save the industry. Coppull Mill was one of 104 mills bought by the LCC, and one of the 53 mills that survived through to 1950.

== Architecture ==
A four-storey late mill, with terracotta decoration. It had an elaborately decorated water tower. An extension for carding was to the west, it had a separate boiler house and circular chimney.

=== Power ===
It was driven by a-1600 hp triple-expansion four-cylinder engine by J & E Wood built in 1906. Its 26-foot (7.9 m) flywheel operated at 68 rpm and ran 36 ropes. It steamed at 200psi.

=== Equipment ===
Ring frames doing coarse counts.

== Owners ==
- Coppull Ring Spinning Co
- Lancashire Cotton Corporation (1941-1964)
- Courtaulds (1964-

== See also ==
- Listed buildings in Coppull
- Textile manufacturing
- Cotton Mill

== Bibliography ==
- Ashmore, Owen (1982). The industrial archaeology of North-west England. Manchester University Press. ISBN 0-7190-0820-4.
- Dunkerley, Philip (2009). "Dunkerley-Tuson Family Website, The Regent Cotton Mill, Failsworth". Archived from the original on 23 March 2008.
- LCC (1951). The mills and organisation of the Lancashire Cotton Corporation Limited. Blackfriars House, Manchester: Lancashire Cotton Corporation Limited.
- Roberts, A S (1921), "Arthur Robert's Engine List", Arthur Roberts Black Book., One guy from Barlick-Book Transcription, archived from the original on 23 July 2011
