= J & E Wood =

English steam engine company

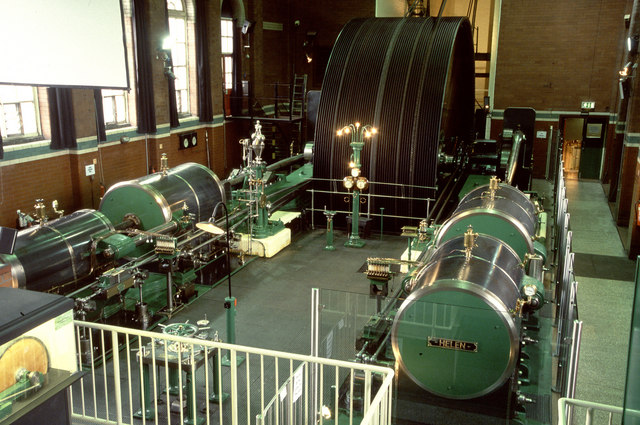
- Triple expansion in Trencherfield Mill, Wigan
- Industry: Engineering
- Founder: James and Edward Wood
- Headquarters: Bolton, Greater Manchester
- Number of locations: Trencherfield Mill
- Products: Stationary steam engines, Triple expansion cross compound with Corliss valvess,

J & E Wood was a company that manufactured stationary steam engines. It was based in the Bolton in Greater Manchester, England. The company produced large steam-driven engines for textile mills in Lancashire and elsewhere.

== History ==
The firm started as Knight and Wood, having premises at the Victoria Foundry in Garside Street, Bolton. The name changed around 1860 to James and Edward Wood. J & E Wood engines were characterised by having a neat appearance, the valve gear was beneath the cylinders. From 1875 on, they only used Corliss valves.

== The Mutual Mill Engine ==
On 7 September 1893, one of J & E Woods 1892 engines in Mutual Mills, Rochdale was extensively tested by Mr J L F Crosland and the results published. The engines were triple expansion with four cylinders arranged in a horizontal double tandem formation. The high pressure (HP) cylinder had a bore of 21 inches (530 mm), the intermediate pressure (IP) cylinder had a bore of 33 inches (840 mm) and the two low pressure (LP) cylinders 35 inches (890 mm). The stroke was 6 feet (1.8 m) and the engine operated at 53 rpm. The engines were fitted with Corliss valves operated by a simple proprietary trip motion. The piston rods for the HP and IP are 4.75 inches (121 mm) and 5.25 inches (133 mm). During the test, the two 30 feet (9.1 m) by 8 feet (2.4 m) Lancashire boilers with 3 ft 2 in diameter flues produced steam at 156 psi. There were Galloway tubes in the flues and behind the boilers was an economiser with 288 pipes. Water was delivered to the boilers at 304 °F (151 °C). The boilers were fed by mechanical stokers using coal known as Shaw slack with a calorific value of 12,963 Btu/lb. During two days of testing the engine developed power of 1089.7 and 1049.4. The power developed on the two sides of the engine was balanced being 542.2 IHP and 547.5 IHP. On the two days 1.37 lb/IHP hr and 1.38 lb/IHP hr. Taking into account that coal could be bought at 6s/ton- this means that 1d would buy 23.1 IHP hrs or 5544 IHP hrs per pound sterling. For a thermal efficiency point of view, of the 14935 Btu of heat supplied, 2545 Btus were converted into mechanical work. This is an efficiency of 0.172 while a perfect engine gives 0.279, Theoretical Carnot Cycle Efficiency, so the engine has a relative efficiency of 0.616. This is taken as the reference standard for an engine of this configuration.

== Mills driven by J and E Wood engines ==
- Trencherfield Mill, Wigan- this engine is still in steam operating every Sunday as a visitor attraction.
- Woodland Mills, Milnbridge, Huddersfield. 500 hp tandem compound due to be restored at Internal Fire Museum of Power in Wales.
- Coppull Mill, Coppull
- Mavis Mill, Coppull
- Pilot Mill, Bury
- Royd Mill, Oldham
- Mutual Mills
- Brooklands Mill, Pennington, Leigh
- Bursledon Brickworks, Hampshire – this engine is in steam once a month March–November as a visitor attraction

== See also ==
- Hick, Hargreaves & Co. Ltd.
