= Dobson & Barlow =

Manufacturer of textile machinery

Dobson and Barlow
- Company type: Partnership
- Industry: Textile machinery
- Founded: 1851
- Founder: Isaac Dobson
- Headquarters: Bolton, UK
- Key people: Peter Rothwell
- Products: Hydraulic presses
- Number of employees: 1600 (1860)

Dobson and Barlow were manufacturers of textile machinery with works in Bolton, Greater Manchester. Isaac Dobson (1767–1833) founded the company in 1790 and by 1850 Dobson in partnership with Peter Rothwell had premises in Blackhorse Street which produced mules for cotton spinning. The company moved to a larger factory in Kay Street which had 1,600 workers in 1860.

== Early history ==
Isaac Dobson was succeeded by his nephew Benjamin Dobson (1823–1874), with Edward Barlow (1821–1868) becoming a partner in 1851. Benjamin Alfred Dobson (1847–1898) became a partner on the retirement of his uncle in 1871, and was the great-grandson of Isaac Dobson.

During World War I the company withdrew from textile machinery manufacture and became one of the largest manufacturers of munitions in the area, making hand grenades, artillery shells, field kitchens, mobile workshops, naval mines and search lights.

== Later history ==
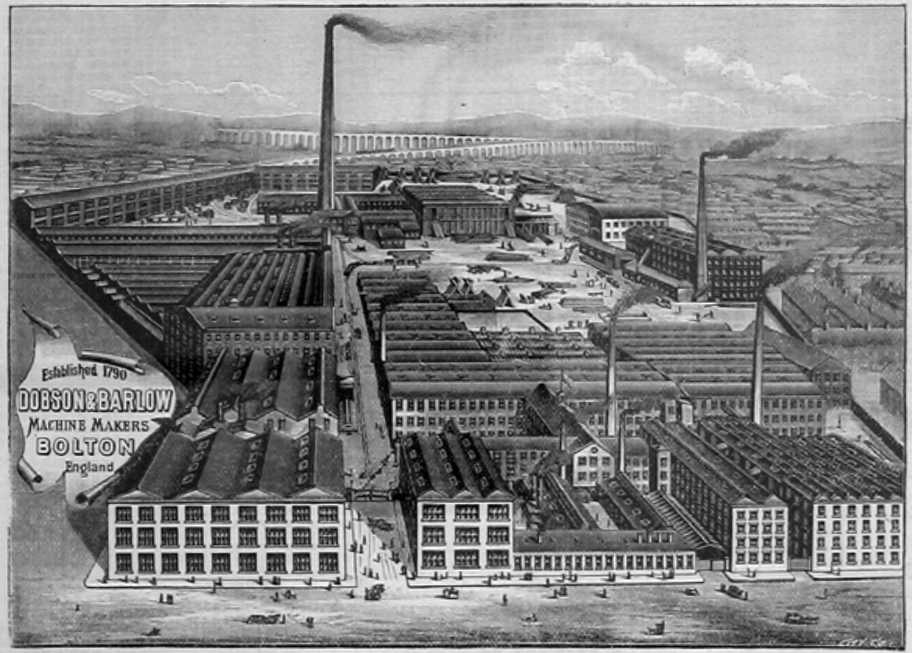

In the recession of the 1930s, Platt Brothers, Howard and Bullough, Brooks and Doxey, Asa Lees, Dobson and Barlow, Joseph Hibbert, John Hetherington and Tweedales and Smalley merged to become Textile Machinery Makers Ltd., but the individual units continued to trade under their own names until 1970, when they were rationalised into one company called Platt UK Ltd. In 1991 the company name changed to Platt Saco Lowell. The Globe works closed in 1993.

== See also ==
- Benjamin Hick

== Bibliography ==
- Halton, Maurice J. "The Impact of Conflict and Political Change on Northern Industrial Towns, 1890 to 1990, " MA Dissertation, Faculty of Humanities and Social Science, Manchester Metropolitan University September 2001 [https://web.archive.org/web/20170318084559/http://englishessaypartners.co.uk/data/documents/The-Impact-of-Conflict-and-Political-Change.pdf
