= Textile Machinery Makers Ltd =

British machine manufacturing company

- Company type: Limited
- Industry: Textile machinery
- Founded: 1931
- Defunct: 1970s
- Headquarters: Manchester, UK
- Products: Preparation and Spinning Weaving and Finishing machines for Cotton and Worsted

In the recession of the 1930s, Platt Brothers, Howard and Bullough, Brooks and Doxey, Asa Lees, Dobson and Barlow, Joseph Hibbert, John Hetherington and Tweedales and Smalley merged to become Textile Machinery Makers Ltd., but the individual units continued to trade under their own names until 1970, when they were rationalised into one company called Platt UK Ltd. In 1991 the company name changed to Platt Saco Lowell. The Globe works closed in 1993.

== History ==
Textile Machinery Makers Ltd was registered in 1931 when Platt Brothers provided the office space and Bullough became chairman of a cartel of British textile machine manufacturing companies. They faced a problem of massive overcapacity. They chose to maintain prices, close four of their sites and to acquire control of their competitors. This was achieved by 1938. In 1933, Platts bought a controlling share of Tweedales and Smalley, putting three if its directors onto the Tweedales board, markets were then amicable divided. Next Taylor, Lang & Co Ltd. of Stalybridge was acquired. The capital of the member firms was reduced by 81%. There was an attempt to unify the design of the machines of member companies, particularly the ring frames of Platts and Howard & Bullough. No attempt was made to diversify into different sectors.
