= Asa Lees =

Textile machine manufacturer

Asa Lees & Co. Ltd
- Type: Limited Company
- Industry: Textile machinery
- Founded: 1790/1872
- Founder: Samuel Lees
- Successor: Textile Machinery Makers Ltd
- Headquarters: Oldham, UK
- Products: Preparation and spinning machinery, gassing and beaming.

Asa Lees was a firm of textile machine manufacturers in Oldham, Lancashire. Their headquarters was the Soho Iron Works, Greenacres. It was second only in size to Platt Brothers.

== Early history ==
Samuel Lees founded a roller making works in the 1790s, it was called the Soho Works. His second son Asa Lees (1816–62) inherited the premises. He expanded the business, exporting fustian power looms to St Petersburg. He abandoned looms to concentrate on manufacturing preparation and spinning machinery. The Soho Cotton mills was converted to a Mule carriage works. Asa Lees became a limited company in 1868, four years after Platts and the shares were quoted on the Oldham share market until the 1890s. It never published its accounts, though its dividends were consistently higher than Platts, and remained profitable in 1928 when Platts made a loss. They were conservative in their trading, dealing only with reliable firms. They did not push for exports. They experienced rapid expansion in the 1880s under the management of Robert Taylor (1823–1912) and production peaked in 1906 when they were employing 3000 men.

== Later history ==
In the recession of the 1930s, Platt Brothers, Howard and Bullough, Brooks and Doxey, Asa Lees, Dobson and Barlow, Joseph Hibbert, John Hetherington and Tweedales and Smalley merged to become Textile Machinery Makers Ltd., but the individual units continued to trade under their own names until the 1970, when they were rationalised into one company called Platt UK Ltd. In 1991 the company name changed to Platt Saco Lowell.

== The premises ==
- Soho Iron Works - Greenacres SD 939053 53°32′38″N 2°05′38″W
