= Howard & Bullough =

English textile machine manufacturer

- Type: Partnership
- Industry: Manufacture of machinery for textile, apparel and leather production machinery industry and plant construction
- Predecessor: Howard & Bleakley
- Founded: 1856
- Headquarters: Accrington, Lancashire, England
- Products: Power looms
- Footnotes; Tweedales and Smalley was formed by this companies executives.

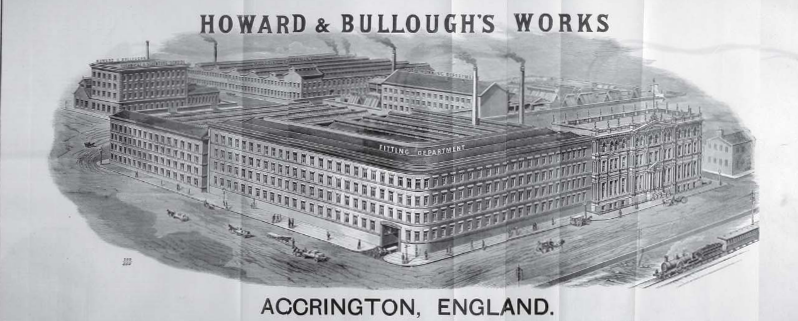
Globe Works, Accrington

Howard & Bullough was a firm of textile machine manufacturers in Accrington, Lancashire. The company was the world's major manufacturer of power looms in the 1860s.

== History ==
The firm of Howard and Bleakley was founded in 1851 with four workers; in 1856 Bleakley retired and the partnership was changed to Howard & Bullough. John Bullough had perfected a self-acting temple on his handloom, and with William Kenworthy at Brookhouse Mills had been responsible for the Lancashire Loom. By 1856 they employed 150 workers; John's son James joined in 1862. They initially concentrated on looms, but eventually expanded to manufacture the complete range of machinery used in a cotton mill.

John Bullough, (born 1837) died in 1891. By then Bulloughs was the world's largest manufacturer of ring spinning frames, and John, the owner of the Isle of Rùm, was the first cotton machine manufacturing millionaire. Three of the company's executives, Edmund and Samuel Tweedale and Joseph Smalley left to set up business in Castleton, Rochdale. The firm was Tweedales and Smalley. The company's first spindles equipped the Newhey Spinning Mill in February 1893. In 1897 they provided spinning machinery for use in the Drezna factory established by Ivan Zimin.

Bulloughs was one of the country's largest manufacturers. At its peak the Globe Works dominated the town, employing almost 6,000 workers and covering 52 acres (21 ha). Seventy-five percent of the company's production was exported.

=== 1914 lock-out ===
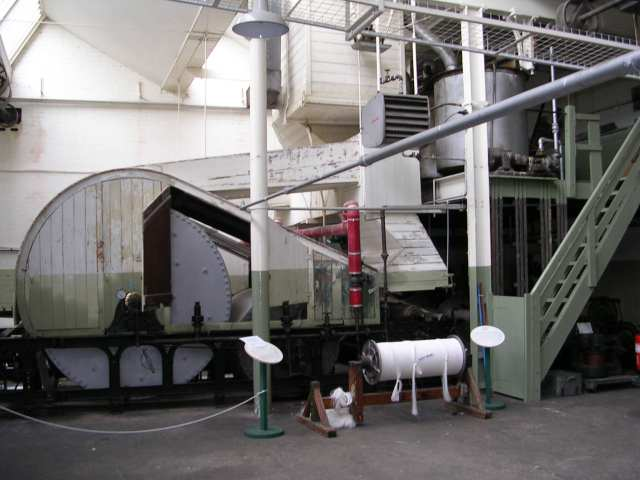
A 1919 Cylinder Tape Sizing Machine built by Howard & Bullough installed at Queen Street Mill Textile Museum, Burnley

Following the refusal of Howard & Bullough's management to meet the demands of the Amalgamated Society of Engineers (ASE) for trade union recognition and a minimum wage, up to 600 engineers at the works went on strike on 2 July. Six days later, the management locked-out the whole workforce of nearly 5,000 men and boys. Although members of the A.S.E. received £1/week lock-out pay while on strike and 1100 members of the Gasworkers and General Labourers Union received 10s (50 pence)/week, some 2,000 non-union workers were left without any income. At this time, the defensive Battle of Mons was being fought and the War Office was actively seeking to recruit men. A Pals battalion had been raised in Manchester, and the Mayor of Accrington undertook to raise a battalion of Accrington Men.

During the Second World War they turned to manufacture of armaments such as bayonets, shells, gun carriages, mine sinkers and aircraft components.

In the recession of the 1930s, Platt Brothers, Howard and Bullough, Brooks and Doxey, Asa Lees, Dobson and Barlow, Joseph Hibbert, John Hetherington and Tweedales and Smalley merged to become Textile Machinery Makers Ltd., but the individual units continued to trade under their own names until the 1970s, when they were rationalised into one company called Platt UK Ltd. In 1991 the company changed its name to Platt Saco Lowell. The Globe Works closed in 1993.

== Bullough's inventions ==
James Bullough improved his loom by inventing various components, including the "self-acting temple", which kept the woven cloth at its correct width, the weft fork (patented 1841 but disputed by Osbaldeston) and a loose reed that allowed the lathe to back away on encountering a shuttle trapped in the warp. Bullough also invented a simple but effective warning device which rang a bell every time the warp thread broke on his loom. He worked with William Kenworthy at Brookhouse Mills, with whom he applied his inventions to develop an improved power loom that became known as the Lancashire Loom.

John Bullough, with James Whittaker and John Walmsley, developed a machine, patented in 1852, that sized two warps and wound them on two beams simultaneously.

== Philanthropy ==
In accordance with the traditions of the times, Bulloughs attempted to improve the lives of its workers with acts of philanthropy. It gave James Bullough Park to the town of Accrington in 1913, and the Globe Tennis club grounds in 1926.

== See also ==
- George Bullough
