= Platt Brothers =

1770–1982 British textile machinery company

Coordinates: 53°32′20″N 2°07′48″W

Platt Brothers & Co Ltd
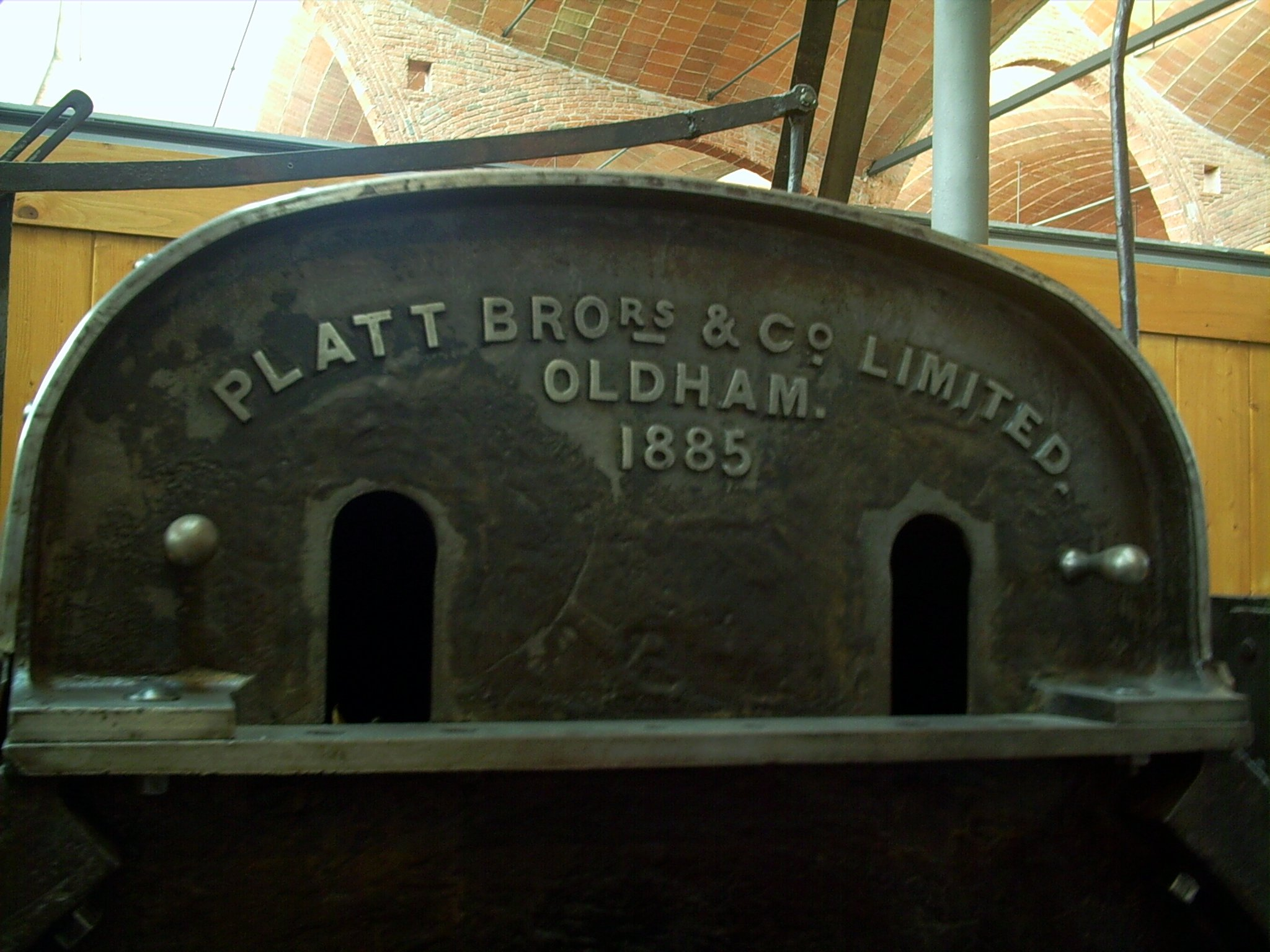
- Industry: machinery industry and plant construction
- Founded: 1770
- Defunct: 1982
- Headquarters: Werneth, Oldham, England
- Key people: Henry Platt
- Products: Textile-processing machinery
- Number of employees: 15,000

Platt Brothers, also known as Platt Bros & Co Ltd, was a British company based at Werneth in Oldham, North West England. The company manufactured textile machinery and were iron founders and colliery proprietors. By the end of the 19th century, the company had become the largest textile machinery manufacturer in the world, employing more than 12,000 workers.

== Companies ==
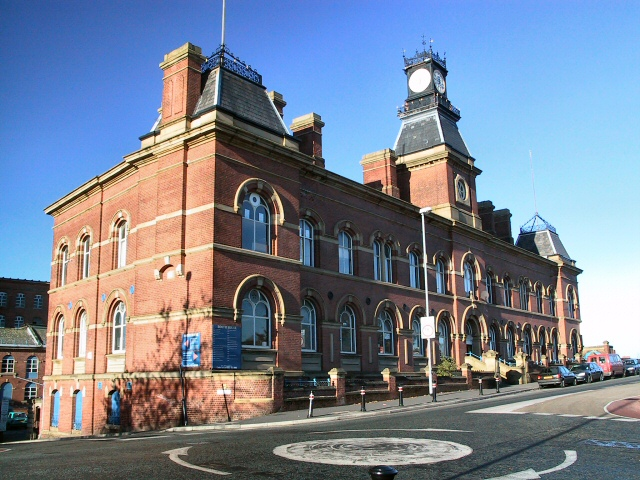
Booth House at Werneth, former headquarters of Platt Brothers

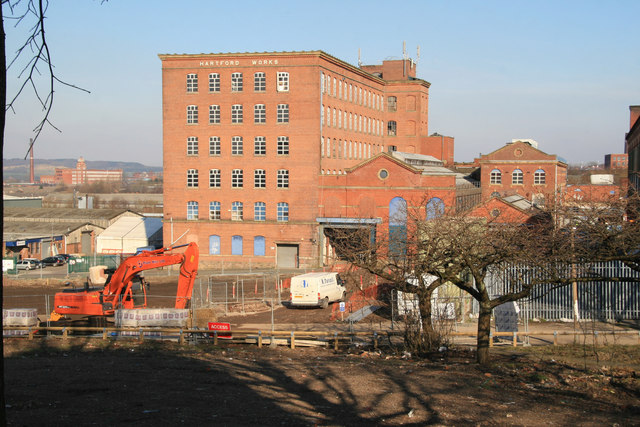
Hartford Works

Henry Platt was a blacksmith who in 1770 was manufacturing carding equipment, in Dobcross, Saddleworth, to the east of Oldham. His grandson, also Henry, founded a similar business in Uppermill. In 1820, the grandson, Henry Platt moved to Huddersfield Road, Oldham and re-established his business there. He and Elijah Hibbert formed a partnership Hibbert and Platt. When his sons, Joseph and John joined the company, it was renamed Hibbert Platt and Sons. Henry Platt died in 1842 and Elijah Hibbert in 1854.

All the shares went to the Platt family and the company became Platt Brothers & Company. In 1844 Platt Brothers acquired the Hartford New Works in the Werneth area of Oldham. In 1868, they moved their headquarters from the 'Old Works' to the 'New Works' and took on limited liability status. When John Platt died in 1872 the company employed 7,000 men and had established itself as the world's largest textile machinery manufacturer. In the 1890s it was estimated that the works supported 42% of Oldham's population.

Platts owned the Jubilee Colliery in Crompton and Butterworth Hall Colliery in Milnrow.

During World War I the company produced munitions, but afterwards resumed textile machinery manufacture and continued to expand. 1922 was a year of record profits and the firm became a public limited company. In 1929 Platt Brothers employed 12000 people, and the New Works covered 65 acres (260,000 m^{2}).

In 1931, the company took a controlling interest in Textile Machinery Makers Ltd, which had been formed from other textile machine manufactures including Asa Lees & Co Ltd. The company name changed to Platt Bros.(Holdings) Ltd. Platt Bros.(Sales) Ltd was spun off in 1946, when Sir Kenneth Preston joined the company from J.Stone Ltd.

Platt International was formed in 1970 from the textile division of Stone Platt, and it acquired the Saco Lowell Corporation in 1973 and became Platt-Saco-Lowell in 1975. The Oldham premises closed in the early 1980s. The drawings and rights to the Platt Ginning Machines are owned by HSL Engineering in Leeds West Yorkshire.

== Products ==
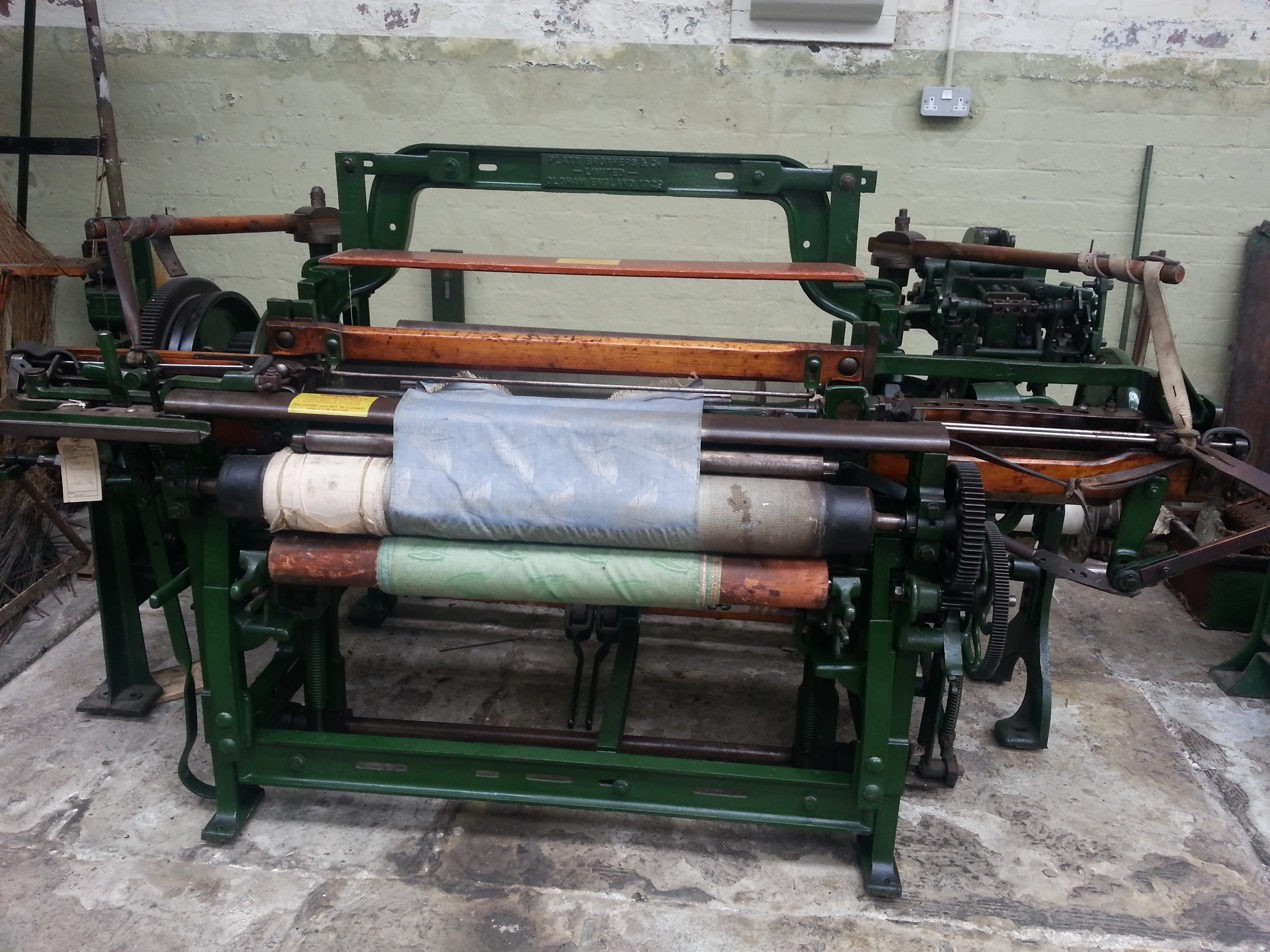
Loom manufactured by Platt Brothers of Oldham. Loom is on display at Queen Street Mill Textile Museum, Harle Syke, Burnley.

Textile manufacturing involves converting of three types of fibre into yarn, then fabric, then textiles. These are then fabricated into clothes or other artefacts. Cotton was the most important natural fibre, but there was a sizeable Worsted industry in neighbouring West Yorkshire. Cotton was harvested, ginned and transported Britain in bales. At the factories the bales were broken open, the fibres were willowed and scutched before being carded. The carded fibres were combed, drawn, slubbed and roved before they were ready to be spun. Spinning was done on a spinning mule. Before mechanisation each process was done by hand, but as 19th progressed mechanisation was introduced. From 1857, Platts supplied the complete range of spinning and weaving machinery. It surpassed Dobson & Barlow of Bolton in size in 1854. Platts constructed looms for export from 1857. Platts introduced successive models of carding machines, roving frames and self-acting mules in 1868, 1886 and 1900. The self-acting mule was the basis of the company's success being faster, longer and more productive than those of their rivals. Workmen in Platts became shareholders in the Oldham Limiteds mills on the late 1860s ensuring Platt machinery was purchased.

After a record year in 1896, the company faced competition from new ring spinning frames, an alternative technology suited to coarse counts. Their competitors were Howard & Bullough of Accrington and Tweedales and Smalley of Rochdale. Platts also supplied plans for mills and the fitters to install them.

== History ==
Shortly before the First World War the company reached its peak, with its workforce numbering more than 15,000 people, and Hartford Works at Werneth covering more than 85 acres (340,000 m^{2}) of land was the largest employer in Oldham and the largest maker of cotton-processing machinery in Lancashire and the world. The works were visited by George V and Queen Mary on the first day of their eight-day 1913 Royal Tour of Lancashire on 7 July 1913. In later years the company's fortunes mirrored those of the Lancashire cotton industry, and the company began a slow, decline. The company's home market gradually disappeared as large numbers of Lancashire cotton mills began to close, and in export markets the company faced tough competition from foreign companies.

The end of its Oldham operations came in 1982 when the company closed its factory. Having been taken over in the 1960s, Platt Saco Lowell had grave financial problems, and was put into administration by its parent company, Hollingsworth. The Platt name (and support for Platt products) continues.

A link between Platt Brothers and the Toyota company of Japan was made in 1929 when the company paid £100,000 for the patent rights for an innovative automatic weaving loom designed by Sakichi Toyoda. The Toyoda Model G loom had mechanical sensors that automatically shut down the loom if a warp thread snapped. The thinking behind this feature was jidoka which translates as automation with a human touch. Workers were freed from monitoring automatic looms and mill owners achieved a dramatic increase in labour productivity with one worker able to operate up to 30 machines. Money from the sale of rights provided the start-up capital for the Toyota automobile endeavour. The name change was done for phonetic reasons so although Toyota is now best known as an automotive company, it began as Toyoda the textile machinery manufacturer.

== Politics ==
John Platt (1817 – 1872), was Oldham's leading Liberal. He successfully campaigned, in the 1840s, for a municipal charter for Oldham. He was a strong supporter of the Anti Corn Law League. His advocacy of free trade and business knowledge led him to visit Paris with Richard Cobden to assist in the negotiations of the French Commercial Treaty. He was elected the first Mayor of Oldham in 1854, an office he held twice more in 1855–56, and 1861–62. John Platt also served as Member of Parliament for Oldham from 1865 until his death in 1872.

Platt's younger brother James Platt (1824–1857), helped build the firm and was active in promoting working-class adult education in Oldham, especially the Oldham Lyceum. He was elected MP for Oldham in 1857, but died the same year.

== See also ==
- Bagley & Wright
- Cotton mill
- Cotton-spinning machinery
- B. Hick & Son
- History of Oldham
- Krenholm Manufacturing Company
- Mather & Platt
- Timeline of clothing and textiles technology
