= Tweedales & Smalley =

British manufacturer of textile machinery

Coordinates: 53°35′N 2°10′W

- Type: Limited
- Industry: Textile machinery
- Defunct: 1933
- Successor: Textile Machinery Makers Ltd
- Headquarters: Rochdale, Lancashire, United Kingdom
- Products: Ring spinning frames

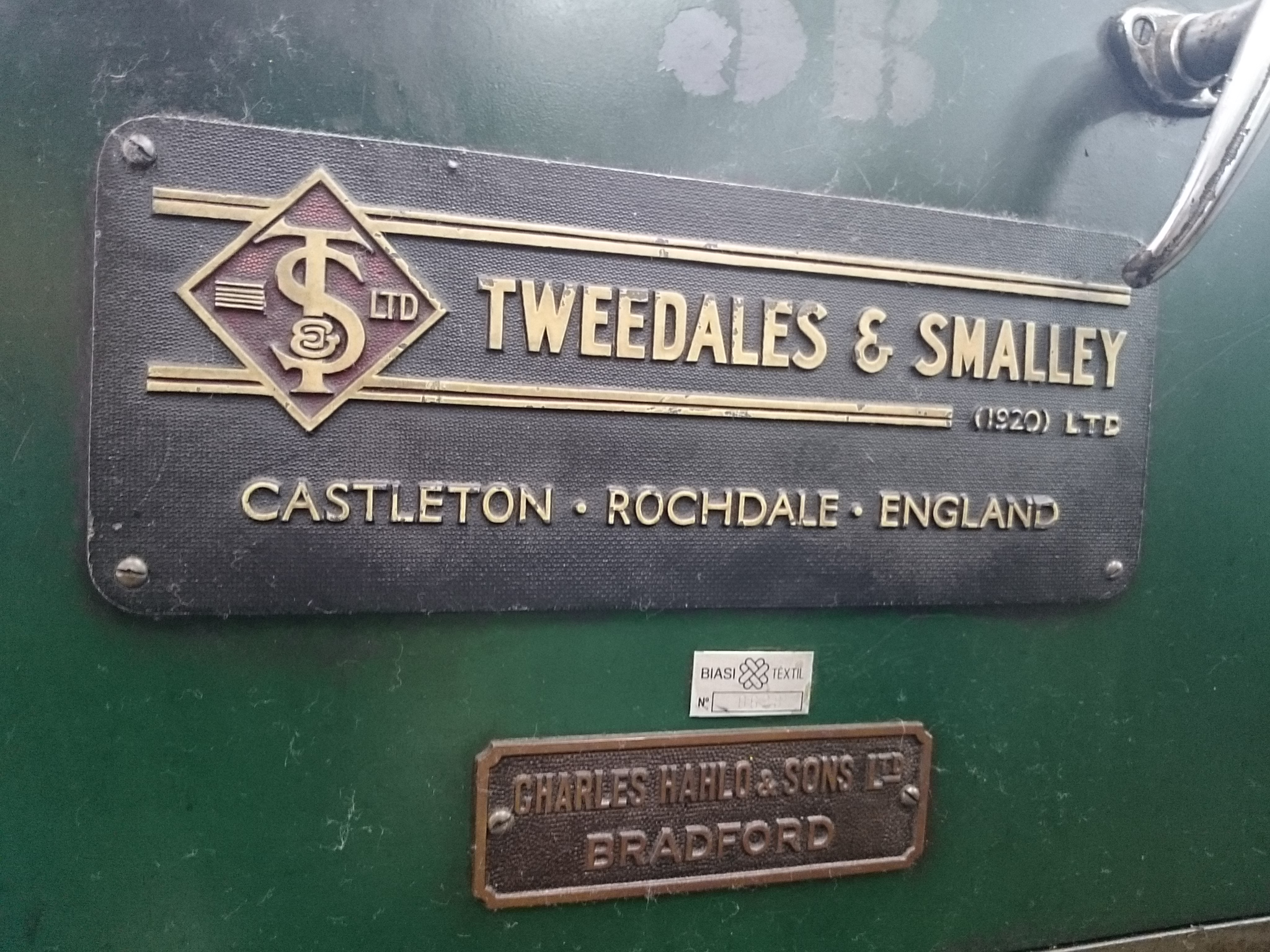
Tweedales and Smalley logo

Tweedales and Smalley was a manufacturer of textile machinery in Castleton, Rochdale, Greater Manchester, in England. It specialised in ring spinning frames mainly for export. The company was founded in 1891 and became part of Textile Machinery Makers Ltd in 1933.

== History ==
When John Bullough, of Howard & Bullough died in 1891, three of the directors, Edmund Tweedale, Samuel Tweedale and Joseph Smalley decided to set up their own textile machine manufacturing business. They started in John Street, Rochdale. In July 1892 they moved into the new Globe Works, Castleton; the layout and buildings having been designed by Samuel Tweedale. Howard & Bullough operated out of the Globe Works Accrington.

The first product was a ring frames. In February 1893, frames were installed in the Newhey Spinning Mill. A speed frame was delivery in August 1893, in February 1894 a drawing frame and in 1895 a revolving flat carding machine. The product were fast and of high quality, India was an important export market. It is said that at one stage half of all textile equipment there, was manufactured by Tweedales and Smalley. It started producing blowing room equipment in 1912.

During World War I, they produced armaments. An accident in May 1916 killed six people. Tweedales and Smalley resisted trade union recognition until March 1917. There was a strike and government intervention when the partners were forced to concede.

In 1920, the partners handed over the company to a syndicate. The families remained on the board until 1926, when only Walter Smalley remained. The company survived the interwar years by an aggressive export drive, taking major orders from India and Russia.

In 1933, the firm became part of the Textile Machinery Makers Ltd but continued to trade under its own name. Then in 1939, it reverted to producing armaments. This allowed it to retool.

Post war, it exported to new markets in 28 countries including Peru, Brazil and Mexico. TMM became a subsidiary of Platt Brothers Holdings in 1957, who decided to close the Globe works in late 1962. Platt had decided that the market for ring frames was declining so it transferred existing work to Oldham and the Globe Works in Accrington.

At one time the Globe Works covered over 14 acres (57,000 m^{2}) and employed more than 2,000 people. In 1964 it became the northern distribution centre for Woolworths.

== Tweedales and Smalley Ltd works band ==
This was formed in 1943, the instruments being inherited from the St John Ambulance Cadets. The conductor was J H Merrick. The firm bought new instruments in 1945 and Clifton Jones became the musical director and remained to 1955, when Herbert White took over. They competed in many contests with national success.
