= Bancroft Shed =

Mill museum in England

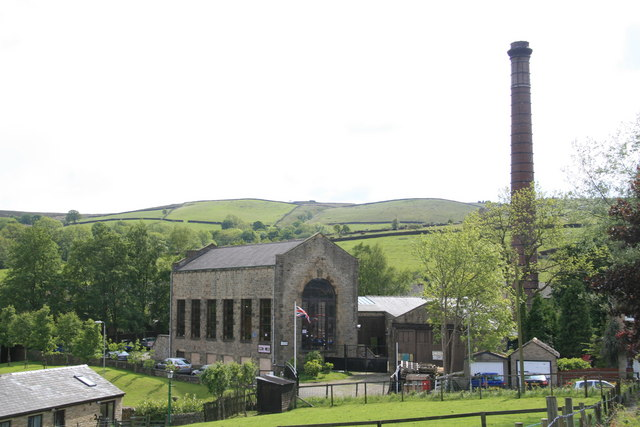
- Bancroft engine house and chimney

- Location within the Borough of Pendle

Weaving shed
- Architectural style: Single storey
- Owner: James Nutter & Sons Ltd
- Current owners: Bancroft Mill Engine Trust
- Coordinates: 53.9111°N 2.1919°W

Construction
- Built: 1914
- Completed: 1920
- Demolished: 1979
- Floor count: 2 storey warehouse, 1 storey shed
- Floor area: 200 feet (61 m) x 250 feet (76 m)

Design team
- Architecture Firm: W M Atkinson of Colne

Power
- Date: 1920
- Engine maker: William Roberts of Nelson
- Engine type: Cross compound
- Valve Gear: Corliss valves operated by Dobson trip gear
- rpm: 69
- Transmission type: Rope drive to second motion, then line shaft

Boiler configuration
- Boilers: Lancashire boiler, coal fired (in operation), now used as water reservoir; Cornish boiler, coal fired (in operation), now wood fired
- Pressure: 160

Equipment
- Date: 1920
- Manufacturer: Various
- No. of looms: 1200

Bancroft Shed was a weaving shed in Barnoldswick, Lancashire, England, situated on the road to Skipton. Construction was started in 1914 and the shed was commissioned in 1920 for James Nutter & Sons Limited. The mill closed on 22 December 1978 and was demolished. The engine house, chimneys and boilers have been preserved and maintained as a working steam museum. The mill was the last steam-driven weaving shed to be constructed and the last to close.

The engine house is open to visitors and the William Roberts cross compound 600hp engine regularly runs from steam generated from donated wood.

== Location ==
Bancroft Shed was the last weaving shed to be built in Barnoldswick, which had twelve others. It is midway between Burnley and Skipton and 30 miles (48 km) north of Manchester, 600 ft (180 m) in altitude in the Pennine hills. In 1920 this industrial town had a population of 10,000 people and there were 24,000 looms. Historically in Yorkshire, in 1974 Barnoldswick and a number of surrounding villages were transferred to the Borough of Pendle in the Non-metropolitan county of Lancashire as a result of the Local Government Act 1972. The town is located on the edge of the Yorkshire wool district and the Lancashire cotton weaving district.

== History ==
James Nutter had space at Calf Hall Shed, a room and power mill, while his mill was built. His mill was designed by W M Atkins of Colne in 1914, but construction was suspended because of the Great War. The weaving shed was completed in 1920 and the opening ceremony was performed in March 1920. About 50 Lancashire looms were installed and weavers from Calf Hall were brought in on a standard wage to loom-in. In 1920, most four-loom weavers were on piece work and were expected to weave six pieces each of 100 yards (91 m) a week for 6s each. Bedding in a new shed was too problematic, however, to rely on piece work wages, so a standard wage was paid. When all the looms were installed and everything was running six weeks later, the company reverted to the Uniform List of Weaving Prices. (Note: The cotton industry operated a list system for defining workers pay, Burnley was late in joining in 1873 and workers in the surrounding country were paid below list. The lists were merged around the turn of the century allowing national collective bargaining. In spite of the weavers' efforts, pay was based on piece work until after the First World War.) The shed opened with part of the first double row of looms closest to the warehouse, eventually 80 pairs of looms on this row ran from one cross shaft. Eventually there were 19 cross shafts.

Opening in 1920, Bancroft Shed missed the profitable years. During the Great War, Britain lost much of its export market, and only the most specialised weaving sheds survived.

=== More looms system ===
Increased efficiency was sought, four-loom weavers were encouraged to work six or more looms. This was the more looms system, which reduced the number of weavers required. The looms were slowed from 220 picks per minute to 180 by changing the diameter of the pulleys. Elsewhere this caused industrial action, but here management maintained the four loom system in most of the mill. Additional power was required in the 1940s and a supplementary Cornish boiler was installed. In 1935, 450 people were working at the mill running 1,152 looms for 50 hours a week making 200,000 yards (180,000 m) of grey cloth.

During the 1939–45 war, many empty weaving sheds in Lancashire were requisitioned; Rover and Rolls-Royce moved into Barnoldswick. An extra layer of management was imposed on the industry when the Cotton Control Board was set up by the Board of Trade. Labour and all resources were rationed. James Nutter took action to close his businesses at Grove Mill and Westfield Shed and moved his looms into storage at Bancroft. This reduced his operable looms to 500 at exactly the time he was required by the Cotton Control Board to reduce output to 40%. While other firms collapsed, Nutters wove throughout the war. From a high point of 808,797 looms nationally in 1915, the numbers had fallen to 530,000 in 1939 and plummeted to 220,000 in 1941 rising marginally to 355,500 in 1949. (Note: The earlier numbers were collated by the Amalgamated Weavers' Association and include only Lancashire looms excluding 'modern looms'. A different set of figures was supplied by Worrall, in The Directory of the Lancashire Textile Industry, from data supplied by individual manufacturers, which were more optimistic. At different times Stanley Graham uses slightly different numbers.)

Under Board of Trade control, working conditions for the weavers improved and the average wage increased from 31s 5d to 78s 0d. On 19 August 1941 a minimum wage agreement was signed. The existence of aero-engine manufacturers in the town provided alternative employment in cleaner conditions. When the war ended weavers expected better working conditions, but the more looms system became almost universal. Bancroft weavers worked eight-loom sets, then ten sets. Tacklers' sets were reduced from 140 to 70 to cope with extra work.

Conditions eased in the 1950s, mill lighting was changed from 110 V DC to 250 V AC. Mechanical Proctor coking stokers (Note: By James Proctor of Hammerton Street Iron Works, Burnley) were fitted to the Lancashire boiler. The looms were re-spaced into ten sets with a separating alley, though a row of eight sets was retained as a "Pensioner Side". Opinion varied as whether a ten set produced as much cloth as an eight set run by an experienced weaver.

In 1976 production consisted of contract weaving and part warps. Experienced weavers and tacklers recognised that demand was drying up and left. In September 1978 closure was announced. The mill struggled until 22 December when it finally closed. Demolition began the following year.

== Mill ==
=== Architecture ===
The layout of Bancroft Shed in 1955

The mill consisted of a two-storey warehouse, a boiler room and engine shed with a large single-storey weaving shed. On closure in 1979, the warehouse and weaving shed were demolished. A 120-foot (37 m) chimney was situated to the west and a 200-foot (60 m) by 82-foot (25 m) lodge to the south. Following demolition of the shed, the lodge was filled in and the line of the road altered. The large Lancashire boiler is kept full of water from the roof gutters, and is used in the condenser (under the engine) and as feed water for the Cornish boiler.

As originally built, the weaving shed was about 250 feet (76 m) by 200 feet (61 m), set into the hillside with typical north facing roof lights to provide natural light, it housed 1200 looms. On the west side was the boiler room and engine house, and the warehouse was to the south. The ground floor was the warehouse and the upper floor was for preparation, sizing, drawing in and winding.

=== Power ===
Steam was raised by a Lancashire boiler and in 1947, when the warehouse needed extra steam for sizing, a Cornish boiler was added but disconnected in 1948 because of problems sharing the same flue. A Green's economiser (Note: By Edward Green and Son of Wakefield and Manchester) preheated the feedwater. The boiler was stoked manually, until a Proctor automatic stoker was fitted in the 1930s. Steam was raised to 160 psi. On closure in 1979, the Lancashire boiler required work, and the Cornish boiler that had been unused for 30 years was renovated, fired up and certificated. It is steamed at 50 psi, powered by donated wood, to drive the engine on Heritage Steam Days. As this was a single boiler shed, it has a 130 feet (40 m) chimney to provide the pressure difference needed to draw the air into the boiler. The Bancroft chimney was repaired and 'banded' by Fred Dibnah in 1997.

The Bancroft mill engine is a horizontal cross compound Corliss valve condensing steam engine built 1914 and installed by William Roberts of Nelson in 1920. As was traditional, the cylinders were named, the high-pressure cylinder "James", and the low-pressure "Mary Jane". Together they were rated to at 600 ihp, enough for 1200 0.5 hp looms, the rating was conservative and the engine could deliver more power if needed. Its speed is 68 rpm controlled by a Porter type governor and a Lumb regulator (Note: By James Lumb & Sons of Perseverance Engine Works, Elland) acting on the high-pressure cylinder valves and Dobson-type trip gear is fitted. The high-pressure cylinder (HP) has a 17 inches (43 cm) bore and the low-pressure (LP) 32 inches (81 cm); both have a stroke of 4 feet (120 cm). It uses Corliss valves.

==== Gallery ====
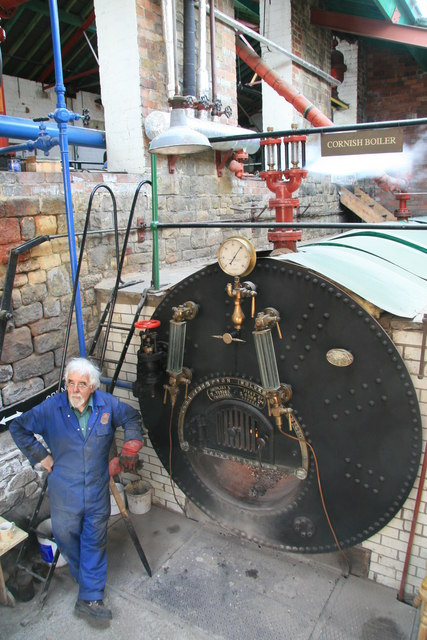
The Cornish boiler (Note: Cornish boiler, Bancroft Mill A hand fired Cornish boiler with replacement brass 'collar' ring by John Thompson of Wolverhampton was bought second-hand from Dicksons of Burnley in 1947. Unusual for British practice as the furnace tube is eccentric to improve circulation. Note the two water level gauge glasses, pressure gauge, firehole door and feed check valve on the front. Two spring-loaded safety valves can be seen on the top. The mill ran on a large Lancashire boiler in the adjoining room. This smaller boiler was installed to run the steam heating system and some auxiliary machines but was not much used as it interfered with the draughting of the Lancashire boiler. Chris Allen cc-by-sa 2.0)

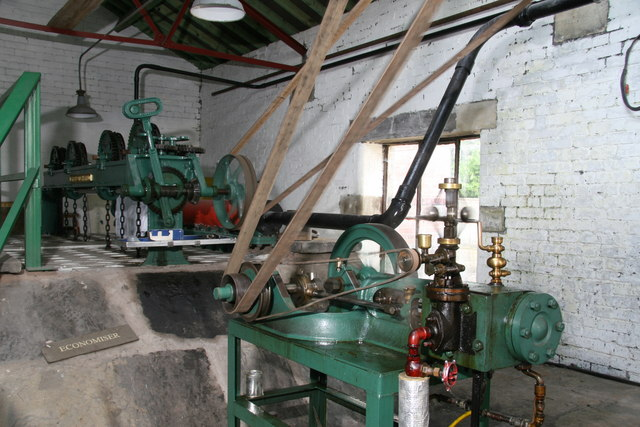
The telltale chains and wheels of an economiser

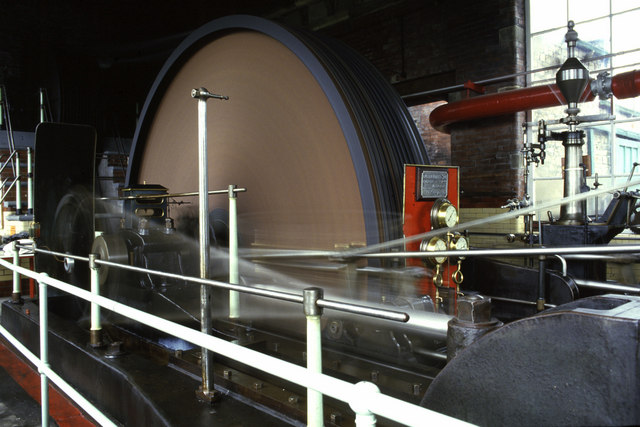
Bancroft Mill Engine running without load on 50 psi

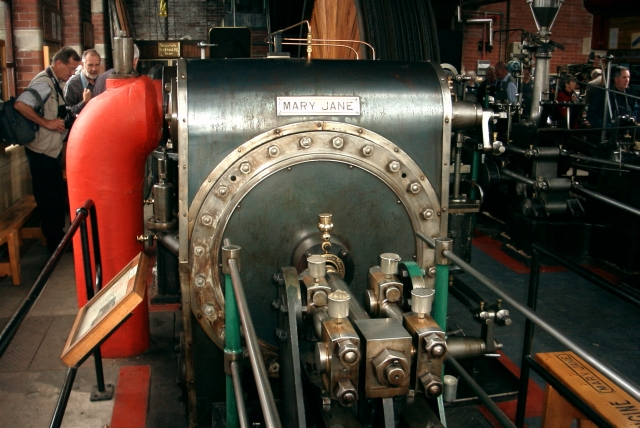
The low pressure "Mary Jane" engine

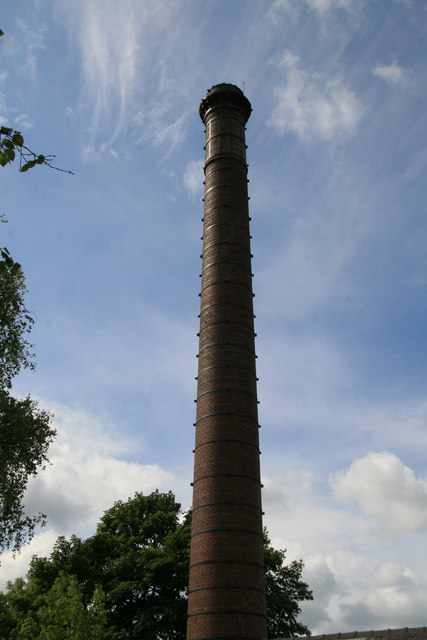
The 120-foot (37 m) tall chimney, brick with oversailing caps

=== Weaving equipment ===
When yarn enters a weaving mill on different-sized cops and cheeses, it is rewound on to pirns to fit the shuttles used by the looms. Bancroft Shed bought its weft "shuttle ready" on pirns in 1920; there was no winding on site. Pirning was started and, in 1970, the mill used Britoba pirn winders. The pirns were carried in two types of shuttles. The original kissing shuttles caused health scares and were replaced by self-threading shuttles.

Warp is taken from 300 bobbins on a V-shaped frame and wound onto a beam. Four or five beams are merged to make the 2000 end beam required, and placed in the Cylinder Tape Sizing Machine like ones made by Howard & Bullough Ltd. of Accrington. The threads pass through size to stiffen them and reduce friction. The size is a mixture of flour, soft soap and tallow: specific to the mill. The threads are dried over steam-heated cylinders and wound onto the weavers beam.

The weavers beam is placed on a drawing-in frame, where each end is passed through the healds, and then through a reed. This job was done by a reacher-in and a loomer. The reacher-in, usually a young boy, passed each end in order to the loomer, who threaded it through the healds and reeds. The mill had two drawing-in frames. Alternatively, if the loom had already run that cloth, a short length of warp thread could be left on the healds and reed. A twister would knot the threads and draw it through. A Barber-Colman knotter could tie in warp threads to the new beam, much faster than a twister. This process took 20 minutes, considerably faster than starting afresh.

The loomed weavers beam was taken into the weaving shed, where a weaver would tenter four Lancashire Looms working at 220 picks per minute. The beam was gaited to the loom and kept working by a tackler who tentered 130. With the More Looms system brought in after the second war, weavers tentered ten looms, but the tackler had a set of 70.

==== Gallery ====
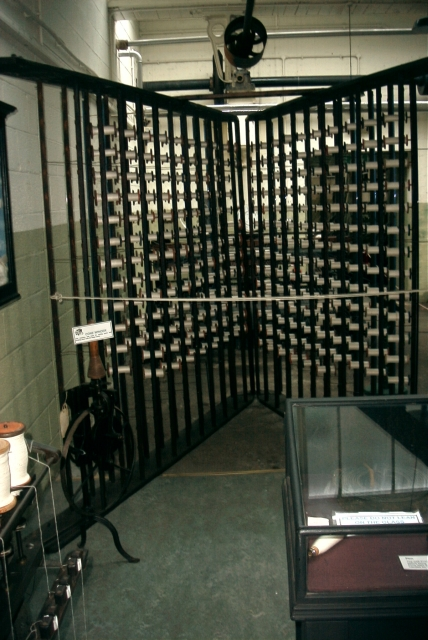
Bobbins for beaming frame (at Queen Street Mill, Burnley)

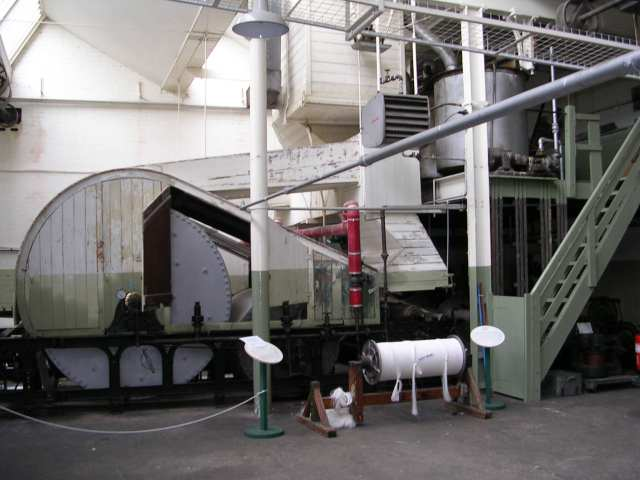
Cylinder sizer (at Queen Street Mill, Burnley)

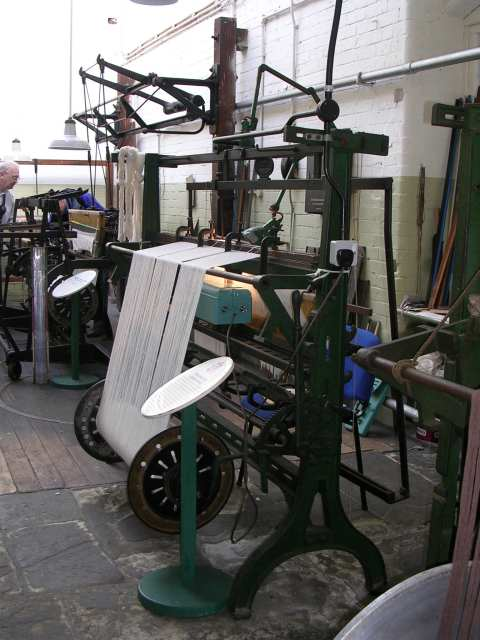
Drawing-in frame (at Queen Street Mill, Burnley)

== See also ==
- Cotton mill
- Helmshore Mills Textile Museum
- Queen Street Mill
- Textile manufacturing
- List of mills in Lancashire
