= List of mills in Lancashire =

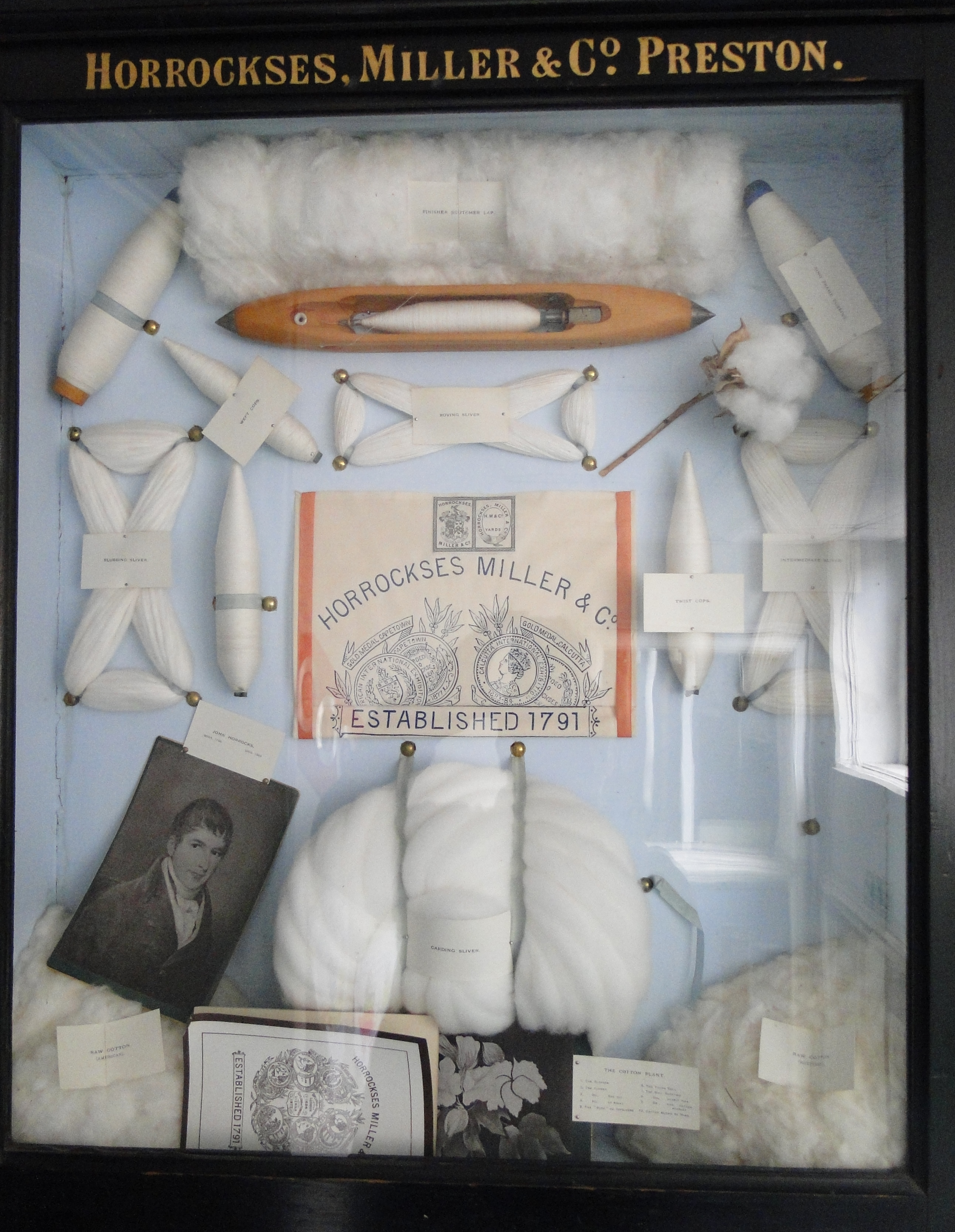
A classroom display of the stages in processing cotton

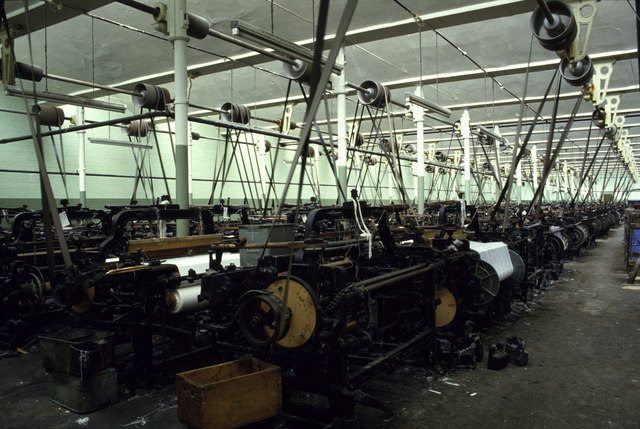
A typical weaving shed at Queen Street Mill Textile Museum, Burnley

This is an incomplete list of the cotton and other textile mills that were located within the modern-day boundaries of the ceremonial county of Lancashire, England. The first mills were built in the 1760s, in Derbyshire using the Arkwright system and were powered by the water. When stationary steam engines were introduced they still needed water, so the mills were built along rivers and canals. As a broad rule of thumb, spinning mills were built in the south-east of the county, and weaving sheds to the north and west. Parts of Lancashire have been subsumed into Greater Manchester and Merseyside, and are not included in this list. Parts of Yorkshire are now included in this county.

== Accrington ==
'Home of Howard & Bullough'

Name	Architect	Location	Built	Demolished	Served (Years)
Broad Oak Mill		SD759283 53°45′04″N 2°22′01″W			
	Notes: A combined mill- 38,200 spindles, 301/501 weft; 778 looms for John Hargraves and Co. Also room and power 576 looms for Broad Oak Manufacturing Co, Limited.				
Spring Hill Mill		SD746279 53°44′49″N 2°23′13″W			
Union Mill		SD746281 53°44′56″N 2°23′13″W			
Woodnook Mill		SD759277 53°44′42″N 2°22′01″W		2009	
	Notes: 100,312 spindles for Accrington Cotton Spinning and Manufacturing Co. Limited.				
Victoria Mill, Wood Nook					
	Notes: 19,712 spindles for Holt and Co.				
Ellesmere Mill, Victoria street					
	Notes: 582 looms for T. A. Griffiths				
Lodge Mill					
Broad Oak Printworks		SD767279 53°44′49″N 2°21′18″W			
Baxenden Printworks		SD776259 53°43′44″N 2°20′28″W			
Alliance Mill					
Broomfield Mill					
	Notes: Accrington Cotton Spinning and Manufacturing Co. Limited				
Grimshaw Street Mill					
	Notes: Accrington Cotton Spinning and Manufacturing Co. Limited				
Perseverance Mill					
	Notes: 618 looms for Accrington Cotton Spinning and Manufacturing Co. Limited				
Victoria Mill					
	Notes: 1829 looms for William Smith and Co				
Queen Mill		SD764293 53°45′36″N 2°21′32″W			
	Notes:				
Hambledon Mill		SD761296 53°45′43″N 2°21′50″W			
Fountain Mill		SD756289 53°45′22″N 2°22′19″W			

== Bacup ==
Rossendale

Name	Architect	Location	Built	Demolished	Served (Years)
Acre Mill		Stacksteads 53°41′28″N 2°13′12″W			
	Notes:				
Britannia Mills		SD880215 53°41′24″N 2°10′59″W			
	Notes: Sutcliffe and Smith, 12,000 spindles, 121/301; 400 looms				
Broadclough Mill		SD868242 53°42′50″N 2°12′04″W	Early 19th century		
	Notes: Grade II listed building 1891: Harry Whitehead and Co,17,000 spindles, 400 looms				
Farholme Mill		53°41′31″N 2°13′01″W	1853		173
	Notes: 1891: (together with Kilnholme Mill) New Bacup and Wardle Commercial Co, Limited, 60,292 spindles, 261/301 twist, 281/401 weft; 1,320 looms				
Forest Mill		Market Street 53°42′00″N 2°12′00″W			
	Notes: To be demolished				
Irwell Mills					
	Notes: 1891: (together with Weir Mill) Rossendale Industrial Co, Limited, 40,000 spindles, 201/248; 1,000 looms				
Irwell Springs Printworks		SD874257			
Kilnholme Mill					
	Notes: 1891: (together with Farholme Mill) New Bacup and Wardle Commercial Co, Limited, 60,292 spindles, 261/301 twist, 281/401 weft; 1,320 looms				
Meadows Mill		53°42′36″N 2°12′11″W			
	Notes: 1891: (together with Olive Mills) J. J. Hoyle Brothers, 32,000 spindles; 766 looms				
New Hey Mill		Newchurch Road 53°41′45″N 2°12′12″W			
	Notes:				
Olive Mill		SD862217 53°41′31″N 2°12′36″W			
	Notes: 1891: (together with Meadows Mills) J. J. Hoyle Brothers, 32,000 spindles; 766 looms				
Ross Mill		SD870220 53°41′38″N 2°11′53″W	1911	1982	71
	Notes: Ross Spinning Company (1911–1919); Dunlop Rubber Co. (1919–1921); Joshua Hoyle and Sons (1921–1980)				
Rossendale Mill		SD849216 53°41′28″N 2°13′48″W	1860		166
	Notes: aka Atherton Holme Mill; Spencer Brothers				
Stacksteads Mill		SD855218 53°41′31″N 2°13′16″W	1833		193
	Notes: Grade II listed building 1891: George Ormerod, 320 looms Now the Toll Bar Business Park				
Victoria Mill					
	Notes: 1891: William Hall, 5,000 spindles, 241/2611 twist, 181/361 weft; 130 looms				
Waterside Mills		SD867234 53°42′25″N 2°12′11″W	1839		187
	Notes: Grade II listed building				

Source 1891 data: Grace's Guide

== Barnacre ==
Name	Architect	Location	Built	Demolished	Served (Years)
Calder Vale Mill		SD533458 53°54′22″N 2°42′43″W			
Barnacre Weaving Co.		SD531452 53°54′04″N 2°42′54″W			

== Barnoldswick ==
Name	Owner	Location	Built	Demolished	Served (Years)
Bancroft Mill		SD874461 53°54′40″N 2°11′35″W			
	Notes: Started in 1914 and commissioned in 1920 for James Nutter & Sons Limited. It closed in 1979 and was demolished. The boilers, engine house and chimneys were preserved and subsequently maintained as a working steam museum. It was the last steam driven weaving shed to be constructed and the last to close, and is well documented. The engine house is open to visitors and the William Roberts & Co of Nelson cross compound 600hp engine regularly runs from steam generated from donated scrap wood				
Bankfield Shed	Bradley Brothers	SD882475 53°55′23″N 2°10′52″W		standing	
	Notes: When it opened in 1905 Bankfield was reputed to be the world's largest weaving shed. James Nutter was the first tenant and was responsible for 900 looms, but shared the shed with the Bradley Brothers who had another 900 looms. James Nutter and Son continued weaving at Bankfield even after they had completed Bancroft Shed, although James Nutter himself had died in 1914. Weaving stopped in 1920. It 1939 it became a shadow factory for Rover, and then taken over by Rolls-Royce for aero-engine production. The 'B' in a Rolls-Royce engine name (e.g. a RB211) designates it was designed in Barnoldswick.				
Butts Mill					
Calf Hall Shed					
	Notes: The room and power mill where James Nutter had 414 looms in 1900.				
Clough Mills	Slater Brothers				
	Notes: The room and power mill where James Nutter and Slater Edmondson were in partnership in the early 1880s.				
Crow Nest Mill		53°55′20″N 2°11′05″W			
	Notes:				
Fernbank Mill					
Hope Mill					
	Notes:				
Long Ings		SD88446953°55′05″N 2°10′41″W			
	Notes: The room and power mill where James Nutter and Slater Edmondson were in partnership in 1888 having 400 looms.				
Lower Barnsay					
Old Coates Mill					
	Notes: The engine was bought by Wilson Wood Colliery, in Ingleton				
New Coates Mill					
	Notes: The room and power mill where James Nutter had 56 looms in 1880.				
Wellhouse Mills					
Westfield Mill					

== Blackburn ==
'Home of Northrop Loom Works' and William Dickinson

Name	Architect	Location	Built	Demolished	Served (Years)
Albion Mill, Albion Street		SD674262 53°43′52″N 2°29′46″W			
	Notes:				
Audley Hall Mill		SD692275 53°44′35″N 2°28′05″W			
Britannia Mill		SD701282 53°44′56″N 2°27′18″W			
Brookhouse Mills		SD687288 53°45′18″N 2°28′34″W			
Burmah Mill		SD697286 53°45′13″N 2°27′37″W			
Cicely Bridge Mill		SD687278 53°44′46″N 2°28′34″W			
Greenbank Mill		SD697286 53°45′10″N 2°27′35″W			
Imperial Mill		SD700287 53°45′14″N 2°27′22″W			
	Notes: Grade II listed building				
Parkside Mill		SD697277 53°44′42″N 2°27′40″W			
Prospect Mill		SD698278 53°44′46″N 2°27′32″W			
Roe Lee Mills		SD686303 53°46′05″N 2°28′41″W			
Vale Mill		SD687306 53°46′16″N 2°28′34″W			
Alma Mill		SD687279 53°44′50″N 2°28′30″W			
Bridgewater Mill		SD687280 53°44′52″N 2°28′29″W			
Canton Mill		SD688280 53°44′54″N 2°28′26″W			
Jubilee Mill		SD693282 53°44′56″N 2°28′01″W			
Nova Scotia Mill		SD682272 53°44′24″N 2°29′02″W			
Waterloo Mill		SD665258 53°43′41″N 2°30′32″W			
Phoenix Mill		SD677277 53°44′42″N 2°29′28″W			
Fir Mill (formerly Albion Mill), Whalley Banks		SD676276 53°44′39″N 2°29′32″W			
Bank Top Mill		SD672276 53°44′40″N 2°29′51″W			
Waterfall Mills		SD672268 53°44′13″N 2°29′56″W			

== Brierfield ==
Name	Architect	Location	Built	Demolished	Served (Years)
Brierfield Mills		SD844365 53°49′30″N 2°14′17″W	1868		158
	Notes: Grade II listed building				

== Burnley ==
The home of Butterworth & Dickinson and Queen Street Mill Textile Museum

Name	Architect	Location	Built	Demolished	Served (Years)
Ashfield Shed		SD837328 53°47′28″N 2°14′56″W			
	Notes: 1891 - J H Whittaker				
Calder Vale Shed					
	Notes: 1891-Waring and Phillips (517 looms), William Brierley (488 looms) and Thomas Burrows (289 looms)				
Elm Street Mill		SD841337 53°47′59″N 2°14′32″W			
	Notes: The 600hp Galloway mill engine is now on display at Museum of Science and Industry, Manchester				
Hargher Clough Shed					
	Notes: 1891 - John Walmsley and Sons. c.1895 - Acquired by Thomas Cowpe and Sons. Weaving shed closed in 1935. During WWII the mill was taken over by Joseph Lucas Ltd. to manufacture aircraft components				
Pentridge Mill		53°47′13″N 2°14′20″W			
	Notes: 1891-E. F. Bleakley and Brother, 33,260 spindles				
Stanley Mill		53°48′04″N 2°13′59″W			
	Notes:				
Waterloo Shed		SD836324 53°47′17″N 2°15′00″W			
	Notes: 1891-William Sutcliffe, 444 looms				
Trafalgar Mill		Trafalgar Street	1846		180
	Notes: 1846-W H Halstead; 1891-William Thompson and Sons, together with Hope Shed, 26,063 spindles and 625 looms				
Clock Tower Mill (Sandygate Mill)		SD836325 53°47′20″N 2°15′00″W			
	Notes: 1891-Sandy Gate Mill Co, Limited, 20,000 spindles and 419 looms				
Sandygate Shed		Wiseman Street			
	Notes: Turner Oates, 24 looms				
Wiseman Street Mill		SD835326 53°47′20″N 2°15′07″W			
Victoria Mill		Trafalgar Street SD833326 53°47′20″N 2°15′18″W	1855		171
	Notes: Grade II listed building 1855-Massey family 1891-Victoria Mill Co Ltd, 19,000 spindles				
Woodfield Mill					
	Notes: 1891-Thomas Cowpe and Sons, 1,317 looms				
Proctor's Mill foundry		Cow Lane 53°47′17″N 2°14′46″W			
	Notes: 2001: Lava and Ignite night club. 2017: Luxury apartments planned				
Bellevue Mill		Westgate SD 833326 53°47′24″N 2°15′18″W	1863		163
	Notes: Grade II listed building 1891-Simpson and West, together with Harle Syke Shed, Briercliffe, 900 looms				
Finsley Mill		SD842321 53°47′06″N 2°14′28″W			
	Notes: 1891-Witham Brothers, together with Plumbe Street Shed, 48,504 spindles and 1,506 looms				
Plumbe Street Shed					
	Notes: 1891-Witham Brothers, together with Finsley Mill, 48,504 spindles and 1,506 looms				
Dean Mills					
Central Mill					
	Notes: 1891-Edward Houlding, 665 looms				
Park Mill					
Old Mill		SD847322 53°47′10″N 2°14′02″W			
	Notes:				
Daneshouse Mill		SD841337 53°47′56″N 2°14′35″W			
	Notes: 1891-Benjamin Thornber and Sons, together with Throstle Mills and Old Hall Shed, 43,000 spindles and 2,028 looms				
Old Hall Mill					
	Notes: 1891-Benjamin Thornber and Sons, together with Danes House and Throstle Mills, 43,000 spindles and 2,028 looms				
Newtown Mill					
	Notes: 1891-Tunstill Brothers, together with Brierfield Mills, Brierfield and Throstle Nest Mill, Nelson, 117,000 spindles and 2,800 looms				
Westgate Mill		Sandygate			
	Notes: 1891-Butterworth and Dickinson, 400 looms				
Queen Street Mill					
	Notes: 1891-Whitehead and Altham, 385 looms				
Throstle Mill					
	Notes: 1891-Benjamin Thornber and Sons, together with Danes House Mills and Old Hall Shed, 43,000 spindles and 2,028 looms				
Livingstone Mill		SD840342 53°48′14″N 2°14′38″W			
	Notes:				
Cameron Mill		SD841342 53°48′14″N 2°14′35″W			
	Notes:				
Woodbine Mill		SD821327 53°47′24″N 2°16′23″W			
Peel Mill					
Lowerhouse Mill and Printworks		SD804329 53°47′31″N 2°17′56″W			
	Notes: 1891-Alexander Drew and Sons				
Wood Top Mill					
	Notes: 1891-Robert Crabtree and Co, 1000 looms				

== Cheesden Valley ==
Name	Architect	Location	Built	Demolished	Served (Years)
Four Acre Mill		SD824161 53°38′29″N 2°16′02″W	1810		
	Notes: Cotton Mill				
Cheesden Pasture		SD824161 53°38′29″N 2°16′02″W	1810	demised	
	Notes: Initially spun and carded wool for domestic outworkers, but was spinning cotton by 1838				
Lower Pasture		SD824161 53°38′29″N 2°16′02″W	1830s	demised	
Cheesden Bar (Bridge Mill)		SD824161 53°38′29″N 2°16′02″W	1840	1898	58
	Notes: This was a two-storey mill, at one point being used for woollen manufacture upstairs and cotton spinning downstairs. It was later used for waste twills and calicos				
Cheesden Lumb Upper		SD824161 53°38′29″N 2°16′02″W	1845	demised	
	Notes: Cotton				
Cheesden Lumb Lower		SD824161 53°38′29″N 2°16′02″W	1786	demised	
	Notes: Woollen				
Deeply Hill		SD824161 53°38′29″N 2°16′02″W	1834	demised	
	Notes: Printing Works				
Deeply Vale		SD824161 53°38′29″N 2°16′02″W	1801	ruins found	
	Notes: Cotton finishing works				
WashWheel		SD824161 53°38′29″N 2°16′02″W	pre-1880s	demised	
	Notes: Bleaching of cotton waste				
Bircle Dene		SD824161 53°38′29″N 2°16′02″W	1824	ruins found	
	Notes: Bircle. This was a full-scale 4-storey cotton spinning mill and weaving shed, The mill produced its own gas and was powered by a large waterwheel and auxiliary engine.				
Kershaw Bridge		SD824161 53°38′29″N 2°16′02″W	1780	demised	
	Notes: A fustian mill, producing thick, coarse cotton material.				

== Chipping ==
Name	Architect	Location	Built	Demolished	Served (Years)
Kirk Mill			1780	Standing	106
	Notes: Grade II listed building An original Arkwright-type mill built in the 1780s. The mill continued spinning cotton using water frames and then throstles until 1886, when it was sold and became HJ Berry's chairmaking factory. It was powered by a 32 ft waterwheel which continued in use, generating electricity until the 1940s.				
Saunderrake Factory		SD614438 53°53′20″N 2°35′20″W			
Wharf Mill		SD623433 53°53′06″N 2°34′30″W			

== Chorley ==
Name	Architect	Location	Built	Demolished	Served (Years)
Albert Mills		East Street 53°39′11.54″N 2°37′30.73″W			
	Notes: 1891-George Brown and Co, together with Primrose Bank Mill, 86,000 spindles and 992 looms				
Brunswick Mill		Standish Street 53°38′59.52″N 2°37′38.76″W			
	Notes: 1891-James Gillett, 418 looms				
Birkacre Mill			1777		249
	Notes: Arkwright's Mill leased in 1777 for £180 per annum, fitted with water frames and burnt down in 1779. Over 2 days, 2000 'wild' people from Chorley burned down part of the mill. 1 person was drowned, 2 killed and 8 wounded.				
Birkacre Printworks		SD571151 53°37′52″N 2°39′00″W			
Canal Mill		53°40′2.74″N 2°37′16.22″W	1855	Standing	171
	Notes: Built in 1855 during the Crimean War. 1891-William and Charles Widdows, 46,360 spindles. Ceased to produce cotton in the late 1950s. Purchased by Gilbraiths Commercial, who serviced trucks, notably Leyland vehicles, in 1968, and eventually began to wind down operations in 1991 concurrent to the crash of Leyland DAF. The following year planning permission was given to turn the mill into a 'themed visitor attraction' and it has been Botany Bay Villages shopping centre since 1995.				
Croft Mill		53°38′55.54″N 2°37′56.33″W	1852	1982	130
	Notes: 1891-Rice and Co, Limited, 560 looms				
Coronation Mill		53°39′33.86″N 2°37′31.13″W			
Cowling Bridge Mill		53°38′45.50″N 2°36′40.48″W	1793		233
Cowling Mill		53°38′45″N 2°36′48.16″W	1906	2022	116
	Notes: 1891-J H Gillett and Sons, 40,852 spindles				
Crosse Hall Mill		53°38′55.05″N 2°36′45.29″W	1838	Standing	188
	Notes: 1786 to 1793-James Duxbury, Rice and Evans. Business failed. 1793-Hall, Wilkinson and Gartside; 1838-Richard Cobden and Bro.				
Diamond Mill		53°39′11.25″N 2°38′40″W		1998	
	Notes: George Edge				
Euxton Mill		53°39′26.73″N 2°41′4.45″W		2010	
	Notes: 1891-Peter Priestley, 15,000 spindles				
Fosterfield Mill		53°39′29.37″N 2°37′10.26″W	1905	1984	79
	Notes: 1891-J. and T. Heyworth, 850 looms				
Grimeford Mill (Anderton)		53°36′39.09″N 2°34′48.76″W	1899	Standing	127
	Notes: c.1940- Adlington Manufacturing Co, 430 looms 2016- Internet retail sales and car body repair				
Grime Street Weaving Shed		53°38′36″N 2°37′36.34″W	1914	1981	67
	Notes: Built as a weaving shed in 1914, sold to Leyland Motors on outbreak of war and never used for cotton. Redeveloped as modern Multipart plant in 1981.				
Greenfield Mill		Steely Lane 53°39′11.46″N 2°37′24.56″W	1861		165
	Notes: 1891-William Brindle and Co, 711 looms				
Grove Mill (Eccleston)		53°38′29.34″N 2°43′15.33″W			
	Notes: 1891-Carrington, Woods and Co, 930 looms				
Heapey Works		53°40′0.26″N 2°36′11.20″W	1872	1989	117
	Notes: Generated its own electricity, had its own railway line, and included a paper mill and printing plant.				
Hope Mill		Botany 53°39′51.88″N 2°37′3.29″W	1903		123
	Notes: 1891-Thomas Howarth, together with Progress Mill, 435 looms				
Lawrences Mills		53°39′0.49″N 2°37′25.06″W	1866	2010	144
	Notes: William Lawrence. The last mill in Chorley producing cotton goods until its closure in 2010.				
Lower Healey Works		53°39′23.67″N 2°36′34.24″W		Standing	
	Notes: Former home to the last Thomas Witters factory in Chorley which produced carpets and closed in 2001. Currently part of Lower Healer Business Park, an industrial estate situated at the foot of Healey Nab.				
Mayfield Mill		53°39′25.38″N 2°37′33.83″W		Standing	
Moor Mill		53°38′49″N 2°36′1.26″W	1852	Standing	174
	Notes: 1891-Nixon and Killick, 33,028 spindles and 538 looms				
North Street Mill		53°39′42.89″N 2°37′45.30″W			
	Notes: 1891-Chorley Cotton Spinning and Manufacturing Co Ltd,115,000 spindles and 970 looms				
Park Mills		53°38′46.27″N 2°38′24.74″W	1914	2011	97
	Notes: Joseph Blackledge & Sons				
Primrose Mill		53°39′17.04″N 2°37′32.41″W	1861	Standing	165
	Notes: 1891-George Brown and Co, together with Albert Mills, 86,000 spindles and 992 looms				
Progress Mill		53°39′9.81″N 2°37′17.23″W	1886	Standing	140
	Notes: 1891-Thomas Howarth, together with Hope Mill, 435 looms. Still stands today as Droyt Soap Factory.				
Sherbourne Mill		53°39′6.75″N 2°37′27.66″W	1840	Standing	186
	Notes: Lawrence Anyon. . Formerly site of Courtella-owned W.G. Underhills which made fabrics until its closure in 1984. Now a timber and DIY shop.				
Talbot Mill		SD596182 53°39′32″N 2°36′47″W	1906	2002	96
	Notes: Talbot Spinning & Weaving Co. Diversified into plastics production after the decline of the cotton industry in the post-war period. Spinning Division closed and demolished in 1989. Weaving division ceased production in 2000 and demolished in 2002. Site remains undeveloped brownfield land.				
Victoria Mill		53°38′53.79″N 2°37′34.75″W	c.1840	1991	
	Notes: Lightoller. Replaced by Morrison's supermarket. Square mill chimney a Grade II Listed Building and incorporated into supermarket.				
Vyking Mill		53°38′57.38″N 2°37′42.27″W		Standing	
	Notes:				
Weldbank Mill		53°38′28.70″N 2°37′59.60″W	1861		165
	Notes: 1891-Weldbank Mill Co, 480 looms				
Weir Mill		53°39′2.47″N 2°36′44.28″W		Standing	
Yarrow Mill		SD592168 53°38′46″N 2°37′08″W	1910	Standing	116
	Notes: Downs, Coulter & Co.				

== Clitheroe ==
Name	Architect	Location	Built	Demolished	Served (Years)
Claremont Mill		SD749415 53°52′08″N 2°22′59″W			
Greenacre Mill (Holmes Mill)		SD742414 53°52′05″N 2°23′38″W			
	Notes:				
Low Moor Mill		SD729418 53°52′19″N 2°24′50″W			
Primrose Mill		SD738407 53°51′43″N 2°24′00″W			
	Notes:				
Shaw Bridge Mill					

== Colne ==
Name	Architect	Location	Built	Demolished	Served (Years)
Spring Gardens Mill		SD888396 53°51′11″N 2°10′19″W			
	Notes: a stone, five storey cotton spinning mill built by the England family, in the 1840s and stayed in spinning to around 1942 when it was taken over by a carpeting firm, Pressed Felts Ltd who operated it until 1988. Since then it has hosted John Cotton Ltd, the Lear Corporation and LBS Polythene. In March 2013 demolition was proposed.				
Green Road Mill		SD888396 53°51′10″N 2°10′21″W			
Primet Mill					
Stanley Mill					
Swanfield Mill					
Walk Mill					
Holker Street Mill					
Garden Vale Mill					
Bankfield Mill					
Empress Mill		53°51′29″N 2°10′00″W			
	Notes: Management buyout in 1927. Still trading in sewing cotton and threads in 2016 at www.empressmills.co.uk				
Vivary Bridge Mill		SD885402 53°51′29″N 2°10′34″W			
Derby Street Shed		SD887402 53°51′29″N 2°10′23″W			
Ball Grove Mill		SD908402 53°51′29″N 2°08′28″W			

== Coppull ==
Name	Architect	Location	Built	Demolished	Served (Years)
Coppull Mill		SD563147 53°37′38″N 2°39′41″W	1906	in use	
	Notes: Grade II listed building				
Mavis Mill		SD562147 53°37′38″N 2°39′46″W	1908	demolished	

== Darwen ==
Name	Architect	Location	Built	Demolished	Served (Years)
Belgrave Works		SD692220 53°41′38″N 2°28′05″W			
Bowling Green Mill		SD696210 53°41′06″N 2°27′43″W			
	Notes: 1891-Christopher Shorrock and Co (with Moss Bridge Mill), 88,812 spindles and 842 looms				
Britannia Mill		Darwen 53°41′28″N 2°27′59″W		In use	
	Notes:				
Cobden and Peel Mills					
Cotton Hall Mill		Darwen 53°42′06″N 2°28′57″W			
	Notes: 1891-Cotton Hall Spinning and Manufacturing Co, Ltd, 43,792 spindles, 24'/42' weft only; 588 looms				
Darwen Mill		Darwen 53°41′25″N 2°27′51″W		In use	
	Notes:				
Dob Meadow Works					
Ellenshaw Mill		Darwen 53°41′48″N 2°27′42″W			
	Notes:				
Greenfield Mill		SD704209 53°41′02″N 2°27′00″W			
	Notes: 1891-Greenfield Mill Co, 1180 looms				
Grimshaw Bridge Cotton Mill		SD708242 53°42′47″N 2°26′38″W			
Grimshaw Street Mill		SD698211 53°41′06″N 2°27′32″W			
Hollin Grove Mill		SD686234 53°42′22″N 2°28′37″W			
	Notes: 1891- Thomas Gillibrand and Sons, 1270 looms				
Hope Mill		SD695214 53°41′17″N 2°27′47″W			
	Notes: 1891- W. T. Ashton and Son, 876 looms				
India Mill		Darwen SD694218 53°41′31″N 2°27′54″W			
	Notes: Mill is a Grade II listed building Mill chimney stack is a Grade II* listed building 1891-India Mills Cotton Spinning Co Ltd, 84308 spindles				
Lorne Street Mill		Darwen 53°42′08″N 2°28′36″W			
	Notes: 1891-Farrer-Baynes, Taylor and Co, (together with New Mills),1552 looms				
Perseverance Mill		Darwen 53°42′02″N 2°27′46″W		In use	
	Notes: 2016-Prolight Systems				
Premier Mill		Darwen 53°41′37″N 2°27′21″W		In use	
	Notes:				
Primrose Mill		Darwen 53°41′36″N 2°27′39″W	1905	In use	
	Notes: 1891-John Wardleworth, 280 looms 2016-Office Furniture company (Mercol)				
Progress Mill		Darwen 53°41′42″N 2°27′00″W		In use	
	Notes: 1891-Shorrock and Whewell,520 looms				
Vale Brook Mill		Springvale			
	Notes: 1891-Duckworth and Cooper, 345 looms				
Vale Rock Mill		Hoddlesden SD718224 53°41′49″N 2°25′44″W			
	Notes: 1891-Haworth Holden, 4000 spindles and Alexander Carus (with St Pauls Mill) 800 looms				
Waterfield Mill		SD699207 53°40′55″N 2°27′25″W			
Whipp's Mill		Darwen 53°42′03″N 2°28′01″W		In use	
	Notes: 1891- Whipp Brothers and Co; 2016-RTE Fabrications				
Whitehall Mill		Darwen 53°40′47″N 2°27′35″W		In use	
	Notes: 1891-James B. Deakin, 480 looms 2016-Whitehall Units Ltd				
Woodfold Mill		Darwen 53°42′09″N 2°28′27″W			
	Notes: 1891- Birtwistle and Thompson, (together with Stanley St and Nova Scotia Mills, Blackburn), 532 looms				

== Earby ==
Name	Architect	Location	Built	Demolished	Served (Years)
Kellbrook Mill		SD903464 53°54′50″N 2°08′56″W			

== Dolphinholme and Ellel ==
Name	Architect	Location	Built	Demolished	Served (Years)
Galgate Silk Mills		SD485557 53°59′42″N 2°47′13″W	1792		234
	Notes: A water powered corn mill replaced by the 1792 stone-built three storey wooden beamed mill of Thompson, Noble and Armstrong. It had a projecting stair tower and mill pond. Cast iron pillars inserted later. Second three storey mill from the early 1800s, stone-built with internal cast-iron pillars, a seven aisled roof. The third mill from 1851 is a five storey brick built mill with corner pilasters and an internal beam engine house.				
Dolphinholme Mill (Worsted)		SD519534 53°58′26″N 2°44′06″W	1795		72
	Notes: Original mill built by Thomas Edmondson to spin using Arkwright water frames. Replaced in 1795 by a larger mill with waterwheel, a steam engine was installed in the 1820s. In the 1850s it changed to cotton spinning and weaving but ceased operation in 1867. Demolished but chimney, a row of cottages and waterwheel pit survived.				

== Farington ==
Name	Architect	Location	Built	Demolished	Served (Years)
Mill Street Mill		Where Mill Street meets Woodville Street SD547232 53°42′11″N 2°41′17″W			

== Great Harwood ==
Great Harwood - Map of Mills

Name	Architect	Location	Built	Demolished	Served (Years)
Albert Mill					
Albion Mill		Water Street 53°47′17″N 2°24′14″W			
	Notes:				
Bank Mill					
Britannia Mill					
Butts Mill					
Church St. Mill					
Commercial Mill					
Devron Mill					
Record Mill		SD740329 53°47′31″N 2°23′46″W			
Premier Nos.1 and 2 Mills		SD737326 53°47′20″N 2°24′04″W			
Premier No. 3 Mill					
Palatine Mill		SD730318 53°46′55″N 2°24′40″W			
Park View Mill					
Prospect Mill					
Record Mill					
Saw Mill					
St.Hubert's Mill					
St.Lawrence Mill		53°47′13″N 2°24′18″W			
	Notes:				
Waverledge Mill		SD730318 53°46′55″N 2°24′40″W			
Victoria Mill					
Wellington Mill					
York Mill					

== Harle Syke ==
Name	Architect	Location	Built	Demolished	Served (Years)
Briercliffe Mill		53°48′44″N 2°12′13″W			
	Notes: Faces Burnley Road.				
Harle Syke Shed Oxford Mill 1858 Siberia Mill 1903		53°48′44″N 2°12′15″W			
	Notes: The Haggate Joint Stock Commercial Company opened it in 1858 as a production mill, but reorganised it in 1865 to become a 'room and power' company. Seven producer partnerships were formed by the shareholders who had been allocated looms on a pro rata basis. The companies consolidated into four main businesses. Shares in the room and power 'walls' company were traded resulting in a smaller number of shareholders with larger investments. In 1903, the 'walls' liquidated passing assets to the Harle Syke Mill Company which built a new larger shed, jokingly called Siberia Shed after a delay in providing a heating system. The mill engine which is now displayed in the Science Museum, London, was upgraded.				
Hill End Mill					
	Notes: In Lane Bottom				
Kings Mill		SD868349 53°48′36″N 2°12′07″W			
	Notes:				
Oxford Mill		SD8635 53°48′N 2°12′W			
	Notes: Faces Burnley Road.				
Primrose Mill		SD8635 53°48′N 2°12′W			
	Notes: Room and power weaving shed. Now demolished. It was powered by a Pollit & Wigzell horizontal tandem compound steam engine.				
Queen Street Mill		SD868349 53°48′36″N 2°12′07″W	1894	Standing	132
	Notes: The mill was built in 1894. It was powered by a 500hp tandem compound by William Roberts of Nelson. 300 of the original 1138 Harling & Todd and Pemberton Lancashire looms are still in situ and workable. Now a textile museum run by Lancashire Museums (closed to the public from 30 September 2016).				
Siberia Mill		53°48′45″N 2°12′18″W			
	Notes: Now industrial units occupy the weaving shed.				
Walshaw Mill		53°48′37″N 2°12′22″W			
	Notes: This was the second 20th-century mill; it faces Talbot Street. It was incorporated 5 January 1905. It was financed with 12000 £1 shares and recapitalised later with an additional 30000. It started with 586 looms which was subsequently increased. It now is used by a pharmaceutical distribution company.				

== Haslingden and Helmshore ==
Home of S.S.Stott and Co and Helmshore Mills Textile Museum

Name	Architect	Location	Built	Demolished	Served (Years)
Albert Mill, Helmshore		SD7721 53°41′13″N 2°20′15″W			
	Notes: 1891:James Barlow and Sons, together with Sunny Bank, 7000 spindles				
Albion Mill, Helmshore		SD7721 53°41′14″N 2°20′04″W			
	Notes: Rawstron and Co, 442 looms in 1891				
Bridge End Mill					
Carr's Mill					
Duckworth Clough Mill, Haslingden		53°42′57″N 2°19′13″W			
	Notes: A new chimney was erected in 1916. It weighed 635 tons and contained 108,000 bricks.When it was taken out of cotton it became a timber mill, which closed in 2006 and the site is now housing.				
Grane Mill, Haslingden		53°42′06″N 2°19′09″W			
Hare Clough Mill					
Higher Mill		SD777217 53°41′28″N 2°20′20″W	1796	standing	230
	Notes: With Whitaker's Mill forms the Helmshore Mills Textile Museum; Grade II listed building Higher Mill was built in 1796 for William Turner.				
Hope Mill		SD779256 53°43′34″N 2°20′10″W			
Irwell Vale Mill					
	Notes: 1891: Thomas Aitken and Son, 7,500 spindles, 221 and 301; 120 looms, calicoes, belting, fustians, filter cloths and cotton drying felts for paper makers.				
Middle Mill aka Power Mill		53°41′14″N 2°20′12″W			
	Notes: Attacked by Luddite rioters in 1826; 1891:Middle Mill Manufacturing Co, Limited, 600 looms.				
Musbury Mill		53°41′18″N 2°20′15″W			
	Notes:				
Park Mill, Helmshore		53°41′19″N 2°20′16″W			
	Notes: In 1891, Worsley, Haworth and Law, 2,800 spindles, 38/108 counts; 78 looms, waste twills and sheetings.				
Rising Bridge Mill		SD782256 53°43′34″N 2°19′55″W			
Sunny Bank Mill		53°40′49″N 2°20′08″W			
	Notes: 1891:James Barlow and Sons, together with Albert Mill, 7000 spindles				
Syke Mill					
Tanpits Mill					
Whitaker's Mill, Helmshore		SD777217 53°41′28″N 2°20′20″W	1820s	standing	
	Notes: With Higher Mill forms the Helmshore Mills Textile Museum. Whitaker Mill was built in the 1820s by the Turner family. In their early life they alternated between working wool and cotton. By 1920 they were working shoddy as condensor mule mills; and equipment has been preserved and is still used.				

== Hoghton ==
Name	Architect	Location	Built	Demolished	Served (Years)
Higher Mill		SD628265 53°44′02″N 2°33′54″W			
Lower Mill		SD627272 53°44′24″N 2°34′01″W			

== Kirkham ==
Name	Architect	Location	Built	Demolished	Served (Years)
Kirkham Linen Mill		SD424323 53°47′02″N 2°52′34″W			

== Nelson ==
Name	Architect	Location	Built	Demolished	Served (Years)
Albert Mills		SD859383 53°50′28″N 2°12′58″W			
	Notes: Croasdale Brothers, 352 looms, Hartley and Co, 780 looms; Thornton and Co, 258 looms				
Bradley Corn Mill (Cotton)					
Butterworth Mill		Home to Peter Reed International Ltd - Manufacturers of Bed Linen to His Majesty King Charles III			
Clover Mill					
Dale Shed		SD870382 53°50′24″N 2°11′56″W			
Marsden Mill					
Oak Bank Mill		SD870382 53°50′24″N 2°11′56″W			
Hendon Mill		SD870382 53°50′24″N 2°11′56″W			
Glenfield Mill		SD870382 53°50′24″N 2°11′56″W			
Laurel Bank Mill					
Lomeshaye Mill		SD851377 53°50′06″N 2°13′41″W			
	Notes: 1891 - William Ecroyd and Sons, 1,940 looms				
Lomeshaye Bridge Mill		SD853377 53°50′06″N 2°13′30″W			
	Notes: 1891 - Lomeshaye Bridge Mill Co, 1,305 looms				
Malvern Mill		SD870382 53°50′24″N 2°11′56″W			
Manor Mill		SD870382 53°50′24″N 2°11′56″W			
Pendle Street Shed					
	Notes: 1891-F. Wilkinson and Co Ltd, 746 looms; J. H. Wilson and Co, 513 looms				
Reedyford Mill				2014	
Seed Hill Mill		SD857381 53°50′20″N 2°13′08″W			
	Notes: 1891-Nelson Manufacturing Co, Limited, 428 looms				
Spring Bank Mill		SD852375 53°50′02″N 2°13′34″W			
	Notes:				
Throstle Nest Mill		Leeds Rd 53°50′22″N 2°12′34″W			
	Notes: 1891 - Tunstill Brothers				
Vale Street Shed		SD866375 53°50′02″N 2°12′18″W			
	Notes: 1891 - James Nelson, together with Whitefield Sheds, 616 looms; Thomas Stuttard and Co, 110 looms; James Tattersall and Sons, 200 looms; Taylor and Dean, 295 looms				
Valley Mills		SD868372 53°49′52″N 2°12′07″W			
	Notes:				
Victoria Mills		SD861379 53°50′13″N 2°12′47″W			
	Notes: 1891 - W. and J. Ratcliffe, 150 looms				
Walverden Mill		SD862376 53°50′02″N 2°12′40″W			
	Notes: 1891 - J. and E. B. Riley, 150 looms; Samuel Smith, 20 looms; Walton and Dyson, 61 looms; Worthington and Wilkinson, 600 looms; Peter Watson, and Co, 70 looms				
Whitefield Mill		St Mary's St SD853378 53°50′14″N 2°13′25″W			
	Notes: 1891 - William Whitaker, 859 looms 2017- Double Glazing installers				

== Oswaldtwistle and Stanhill ==
Home to James Hargreaves

Name	Architect	Location	Built	Demolished	Served (Years)
Moscow Mills		SD744280 53°44′53″N 2°23′24″W			
Foxhill Bank Printworks		SD741282 53°45′00″N 2°23′38″W			
Stanhill Ring Spinning Mill		SD730282 53°44′56″N 2°24′40″W			
Vine Mills		SD732272 53°44′24″N 2°24′29″W			
	Notes:				
Brookside Printworks		SD722272 53°44′24″N 2°25′23″W			
Cabin End Mill		SD722272 53°44′24″N 2°25′23″W			
Fern Mill		SD721266 53°44′06″N 2°25′26″W			

== Padiham ==
Name	Architect	Location	Built	Demolished	Served (Years)
Albert Mill		Wyre Street			
	Notes:				
Albion Mill (Perseverance Mill)					
	Notes: Edward Briggs and Co (together with Bridge End Mill), 26,300 spindles				
Britannia Mill		SD796339 53°48′04″N 2°18′40″W			
	Notes: R. Thompson and Sons (together with Alma Mill), 40,000 spindles and 987 looms				
Grove Mill		Grove Lane			
	Notes:				
Jubilee Mill		SD797333 53°47′46″N 2°18′36″W			
	Notes: Greenbrook Manufacturing, 800 looms				
Riverside Mill		SD79633953°48′04″N 2°18′29″W			
	Notes: 1891- William Ingham & Sons (together with Albert St Mill), 15,000 spindles, 1322 looms				
Stockbridge Mill		Stockbridge Road SD794336 53°47′54″N 2°18′44″W			
	Notes:				
Thompson Street Sheds		SD796334 53°47′49″N 2°18′40″W			
Victoria Mill					
	Notes: 1891-Padiham Spinning Co, 30,000 spindles				
Wellington Mill		Ribble Street 53°48′00″N 2°18′43″W			
	Notes: 1891-John Whittaker and Son, 36,270 spindles and 654 looms 2011-Glassworks				

== Preston ==
Name	Architect	Location	Built	Demolished	Served (Years)
Pitt Street Mill		SD534294 53°45′32″N 2°42′29″W			
	Notes: 1891 - William Entwisle's Sons, Caledonian Mill, Pitt street, 437 looms				
Hanover Mill		SD533299 53°45′47″N 2°42′36″W			
	Notes: 1891 - Birley Brothers, 46,466 spindles				
Fylde Road Mill		SD530300 53°45′50″N 2°42′50″W			
	Notes: 1891 - Joseph Eccles and Co, Steam Mill, 548 looms				
Arkwright Mill		SD532302 53°45′58″N 2°42′40″W			
	Notes: 1891 - Daniel Arkwright, 36,248 spindles				
Aqueduct Street Mill		SD529304 53°46′05″N 2°42′58″W			
	Notes: 1891 - William Calvert and Co, India Mill, New Hall lane; Aqueduct Mill and Flats Mills, Walton-le-dale, 150,566 spindles				
Brookhouse Mill		53°46′03″N 2°43′12″W			
	Notes: 1891 - John and Adam Leigh, 40,520 spindles				
Shelley Road Mill		SD525303 53°46′01″N 2°43′19″W			
	Notes: 1891 - Hartley Brothers, 42,560 spindles				
Tulketh Road Mill		SD524309 53°46′19″N 2°43′26″W			
Embroidery Mill					
Red Scar Mill		SD525306 53°46′12″N 2°43′19″W			
	Notes: 1939				
Stocksbridge Mill		SD525306 53°46′12″N 2°43′19″W			
Brookfield Mill		SD538305 53°46′08″N 2°42′07″W			
	Notes: John Goodair and Co, Brookfield and Peel Mills, 73,951 spindles				
St Georges Road Mill		SD539306 53°46′12″N 2°42′04″W			
	Notes: 1891 - Moor Park Manufacturing Co Ltd, 600 looms				
Centenary Mill		SD551297 53°45′43″N 2°40′59″W			
	Notes:				
Hartford Mill		SD551298 53°45′47″N 2°40′59″W			
	Notes: 1891 - Hartford Mills Co Ltd, 43,472 spindles				
Cliff Mill		SD557297 53°45′43″N 2°40′23″W			
Manchester Mill		53°45′46″N 2°40′50″W			
	Notes:				
Primrose Mill		53°45′33″N 2°41′01″W			
	Notes:				

== Ramsbottom ==
Name	Architect	Location	Built	Demolished	Served (Years)
Four Acre Mill		SD828175 53°39′14″N 2°15′43″W			
Cheesden Lumb Mills		SD824162 53°38′31″N 2°16′05″W			
Croston Close Upper Mill		SD824162 53°38′31″N 2°16′05″W			
Croston Close Lower Mill		SD824162 53°38′31″N 2°16′05″W			
Longland Mill		SD823153 53°38′02″N 2°16′08″W			
Cobhurst Nab Mill		SD823153 53°38′02″N 2°16′08″W			
Deeply Vale Print Works		SD823153 53°38′02″N 2°16′08″W			
Lower Wheel Mill		SD829142 53°37′26″N 2°15′36″W			
Lee Hill Bleachworks		SD805175 53°39′14″N 2°17′49″W			

== Rawtenstall ==
Name	Architect	Location	Built	Demolished	Served (Years)
Cowpe Mill		Boarsgreave 53°40′52″N 2°14′38″W			
	Notes:				
Rawtenstall Lower Mill		SD811228 53°42′04″N 2°17′17″W			
Hardman's Mill		53°41′48″N 2°17′51″W			
	Notes: Grade II listed building				
Holmes Mill, Reeds Holme		SD808244 53°42′58″N 2°17′31″W			
Holmes Shed		SD808244 53°42′58″N 2°17′31″W			
Kearns Mill		Boarsgreave 53°40′52″N 2°14′38″W			
	Notes: To be demolished				
Reedsholmes Mill		SD808244 53°42′58″N 2°17′31″W			
Lower Laund Mill					
	Notes: Grade II listed building				
Sunnyside Printworks		SD811249 53°43′12″N 2°17′17″W			
Love Clough Printworks		SD810272 53°44′28″N 2°17′24″W			
Hall Carr Mill (Greenbridge Works)		SD817226 53°42′00″N 2°16′44″W			
	Notes: Grade II listed building				
Baltic Mill		SD833219 53°41′35″N 2°15′14″W			
Holt Mill (felt)					
Bridge End Mill (felt)					
Gaghills Mill		SD836221 53°41′42″N 2°15′00″W			
Globe Mill		SD827225 53°41′56″N 2°15′50″W			
Ilex Mill		53°42′04″N 2°16′59″W			
	Notes: Grade II listed building				
Dale Mills					
Clark Holme Mill					
Shawclough Mill		SD841233 53°42′22″N 2°14′31″W			
Shawclough Lower Mill					
Osborne Mill		SD835238 53°42′36″N 2°15′04″W			
Sagar Hole Mill					
Isle of Man Mill					
	Notes:				

== Rishton ==
Name	Architect	Location	Built	Demolished	Served (Years)
Unity Mill		SD727308 53°46′23″N 2°24′58″W			
Britannia Mill					
Bridgefield Mill					
Albert Mill		SD726305 53°46′12″N 2°25′01″W			
York Mill		SD726305 53°46′12″N 2°25′01″W			

== Sabden ==
Name	Architect	Location	Built	Demolished	Served (Years)
Sabden Printworks		SD772370 53°49′44″N 2°20′53″W			
Victoria Mill					
	Notes:				
Cobden Mill					

== Samlesbury ==
Name	Architect	Location	Built	Demolished	Served (Years)
Samlesbury Bottoms Mill		SD619289 53°45′18″N 2°34′44″W			
Roach Bridge Mill		SD596288 53°45′14″N 2°36′50″W			

== Trawden ==
Name	Architect	Location	Built	Demolished	Served (Years)
Black Carr Mills		SD912390 53°50′49″N 2°08′06″W			
	Notes: CRS Plant Ltd				
Forest Shed		SD912390 53°50′49″N 2°08′06″W			

== Walton le Dale ==
||

Name	Architect	Location	Built	Demolished	Served (Years)
Bamber Bridge Mill		SD566255 53°43′26″N 2°39′32″W			
	Notes:				
Higher Walton Mill		SD554284 53°45′00″N 2°40′41″W			
	Notes: 1891: George and R. Dewhurst, 77,288 spindles, 308 twist and weft; 1,168 looms				
Penwortham Mill		Penwortham SD540273 53°44′24″N 2°41′56″W			
	Notes: 1891: Josiah Cockshutt, 25,000 spindles				

== Whalley ==
Name	Architect	Location	Built	Demolished	Served (Years)
Abbey Mills		SD733360 53°49′12″N 2°24′25″W			

== Whitworth ==
Name	Architect	Location	Built	Demolished	Served (Years)
Albert Mill		Market Street	1882	2017	135
	Notes: 1891-Whitworth Manufacturing Co, 28,080 spindles, 651 looms				
Bridge Mill		SD884182 53°39′36″N 2°10′37″W			
	Notes: 1891-Matthew Stuttard and Brothers Ltd				
Bridge End Mills					
	Notes: 1891-John Hargreaves and Sons, Ltd, 38,000 spindles, 662 looms				
Brookside Mill		SD884182 53°39′36″N 2°10′37″W			
Dora Mill		SD884182 53°39′36″N 2°10′37″W			
Facit Mill		SD889190 53°40′01″N 2°10′08″W	1904	2012	108
	Notes: 1891-John Whitworth and Sons, Limited, 25,000 spindles, 720 looms (previous mill that occupied the site)				
Orama Mill		SD883178 53°39′25″N 2°10′44″W			
Underbank Mills					
	Notes: 1891-Matthew Stuttard and Brothers Ltd, 20,000 spindles, 420 looms				

== Withnell ==
Name	Architect	Location	Built	Demolished	Served (Years)
Abbey Mill		SD640225 53°41′53″N 2°32′49″W			
	Notes: 1891-John Park and Son, 22,500 spindles and 400 looms				
Brinscall Hall Printworks		SD623205 53°40′48″N 2°34′19″W			

== See also ==
- List of mills in Greater Manchester, for other mills historically in Lancashire
- Category:Lists of textile mills in the United Kingdom
- List of mills owned by the Lancashire Cotton Corporation Limited

== Bibliography ==
- Ashmore, Owen (1982). The industrial archaeology of North-west England. Manchester University Press. ISBN 0-7190-0820-4.
- Bythell, Duncan; Frost (2009). A Lancashire weaving company and its community: Harle Syke Mill. Harle Syke, Burnley, Lancashire: The Briercliffe Society. ISBN 978-0-9553100-8-9.
- Cooper, Brian (1983). Transformation of a Valley: The Derbyshire Derwent. London: Heinemann. ISBN 9780435329730.
- Graham, Stanley (2008). Bancroft:The story of a Pennine weaving shed. lulu.com. ISBN 9 781409-255789.
