= More looms =

Productivity strategy

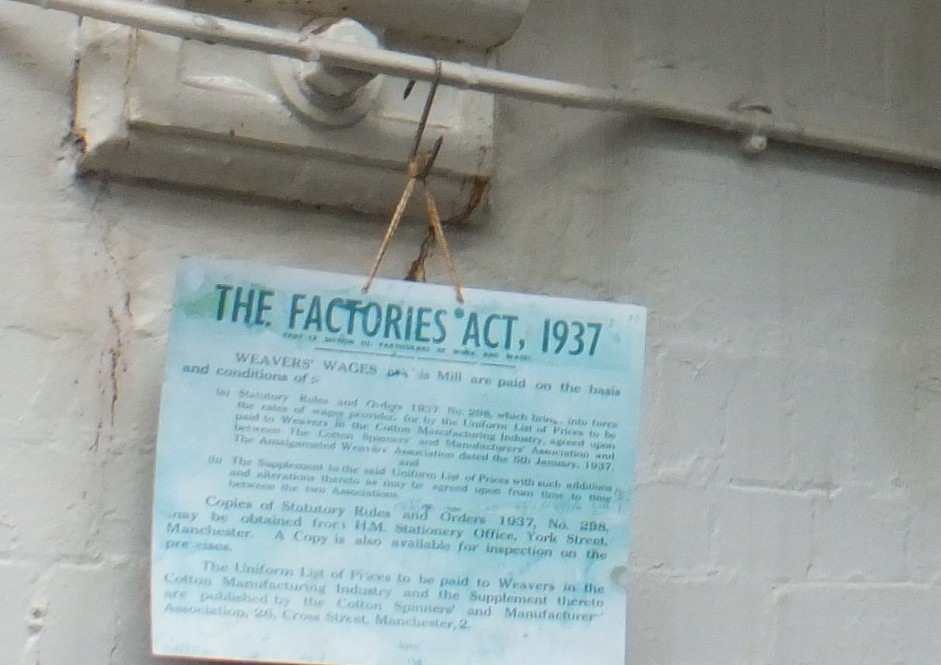
Compulsory Factory Act 1937 notice

The more looms system was a productivity strategy introduced in the Lancashire cotton industry, whereby each weaver would manage a greater number of looms. It was an alternative to investing in the more productive Northrop automatic looms in the 1930s. It caused resentment, resulted in industrial action, and failed to achieve any significant cost savings.

== Traditional weaving ==
For one hundred years the weaving sheds of Lancashire had been equipped with cast iron constructed looms not dissimilar to the original Roberts loom, invented by Richard Roberts. They were driven by leather belts from line shafts. They were closely packed together in pairs with a narrow alley. One weaver was responsible for four looms; it was her duty to replace the weft in the shuttle when it ran out. The weft was on a pirn, so she stopped the loom, found the shuttle, removed it, and bent the shuttle peg containing the pirn towards her; removed the pirn and replaced it with a fresh one. She placed a loop of thread close to the inside of the eye and in an operation called kissing the shuttle, sucked it through. The shuttle was ready. It was placed back in the sley, (Note: Slay: the wooden bed on which the shuttle travelled through the warp shed.) and all loose threads cut off and removed. A final check and the loom was restarted. The loom operates at 220 picks per minute (Note: Pick: the number of times the shuttle travelled through the warp shed per minute which translates to the number of rows of thread woven in a minute or the length of the cloth) and the weaver is paid by the piece. (Note: Piece: a defined length of cloth, in 1920 for grey cloth, the piece would have been 100 yards (91 m).) She was adept at balancing her work keeping all the looms running, so only one would be stopped at one time. Labour costs were a significant proportion of the cost in producing cloth.

== Depression ==
In the UK depression of the 1920s and the subsequent world depression, methods were sought to reduce the labour cost by reducing the number of weavers employed. This was controversial, as the weaver saw themselves as underpaid per piece and were being forced to underwork as production had exceeded demand. Before the war, the weaver had been paid 25% more than an unskilled engineering worker but in the late twenties the skilled weaver has paid less. However, for a woman it was a well paid job.

The weavers were represented by the Amalgamated Weavers' Association.

The more looms system was one management inspired solution to bring more looms into production using a reduced number of weavers overall. The Lancashire cotton industry had considered re-equipping with the Northrop automatic loom with automatic weft stop and shuttle replenishment. Experiments in 1932 showed that with Northrops a weaver could tenter 40 looms though 24 was more usual. This solution was rejected as the industry couldn't raise the capital needed to reinvest, and there were doubts whether the investment could be recouped.

The mechanics of their contract were such that an underemployed weaver could not claim unemployment insurance, and unlike the spinners who had a strong union system they were not prepared to work to a rota of staggered employment and voluntary unemployment, so the insurance would cut in.

== More looms weaving ==
The more looms system was designed to substantially reduce labour costs in order to make the industry more competitive. It would take out some looms and reduce the workforce by thirty percent. The more looms system aimed at doubling the number of looms that a weaver would tenter while making modest changes to the conditions of working. One was to respace the looms using horizontal alleys at the end of each eight loom set making access easier. Another was to increase the size of the cop on each pirn to make refilling times longer. The speed of the loom was reduced to 180 picks per minute. The piece rates were to be adjusted so the weaver on more looms would be marginally better off. Experiments carried out in Burnley in 1929 showed a wage saving of 20% to 30% could be made which would reduce the overall cost of the cloth by 2% to 7%.

== Implications in the weaving areas ==
The unions' approach was confusing. They wanted to implement more looms, but were opposed to it as it didn't pay a man enough so his wife could stay at home. The employers' associations would not pay such a rate. The Burnley Employers Association attempted to introduce the system without union agreement in 1931. This resulted in the industrial disputes of 1931, when the Amalgamated Weavers' Association (AWA) organised a strike, which led to a country-wide lockout. The Nelson Weavers' Association, in which Independent Labour Party members were prominent, felt that the AWA was too keen to make concessions, and organised its own delegation. Led by Zeph Hutchinson, this met with Arthur Greenwood and ILP Members of Parliament. The employers were not united and backed down.

In 1932 the employers issued a wage cut, and after a month of struggle an agreement was brokered which included a 6 looms more-looms option. In 1933 Burnley employers introduced a 6-looms system for about a third of its workers. A third continued on the four loom rates and a third continued a four loom system while paying 6 loom rates.

The Cotton Industry Act 1934 legalised weavers' wage rates forcing employers to pay the standard wage rates that had been negotiated through collective bargaining. The effect of the 1934 rates were that a four loom weaver would have an average wage of 33s 9d while a six-loom more-loom weaver would get 41s 7d.

By 1935 employers in other towns had discovered that they were not realising any savings and would incur costs in implementing the system, the employers enthusiasm for change waned.

Improvements in weaver's rates were made in 1936, though not an agreement for a minimum wage. An upturn in demand in 1937 reduced the number of underemployed weavers, and more-looms was put on hold.

== World war two and weaving out ==
During the hostilities all manufacture was under Government control. Buildings were requisitioned for the war effort, and the quiet spinning mills and weaving sheds of Lancashire were put to other purposes. A good example is how Rover and Rolls-Royce moved into Barnoldswick to produce and later design aero engines. When weaving was re-established in the early 1950s, expectations and attitudes had changed, and the thousand loom sheds such as Queen Street Mill were laid out in eight and ten loom sets and the weavers were on minimum wage contracts. Britain had become a net importer of cotton cloth. Slowly each mill began weaving out. The last mill Bancroft Shed closed in December 1978.

== See also ==
- Cotton mill
- Helmshore Mills Textile Museum
- Queen Street Mill
- Bancroft Shed
- Textile manufacturing
