= Four Loom Weaver =

19th-century English lament on starvation

Four Loom Weaver (Roud 1460), probably derived from "The Poor Cotton Weaver", is a 19th-century English lament on starvation. One source also names it Jone o Grinfilt though this title usually refers to different lyrics and score, which is about the naiveté of country folk. Actually, it is very similar to Jone o'Grinfilt Junior which can be found in John Harland's Ballads and Songs of Lancashire (1875 pp. 169–171). Jone o Grinfilt is believed to have been written by Joseph Lees of Glodwick, near Oldham in the 1790s.

The earlier version, the Poor Cotton Weaver, was probably written before 1800, after the Napoleonic wars it was revived or re-written, due to economic hard times, when weavers were reduced to eating nettles. This could refer to the war itself any of the periodic economic downturns in the cotton industry. It was featured in Mary Barton published in 1848, then later referred to the Lancashire Cotton Famine of 1862. It is found on broadsides in Manchester up to the 1880s, it did not survive into the 20th century. In the folk revival it reappeared. The version by Ewan MacColl probably influenced the version by Silly Sisters and by Unto Ashes. Jez Lowe wrote his song "Nearer to Nettles", after an old woman approached his band's vocalist, who had just sung The "Four-Loom Weaver", remarking she had never been nearer to eating nettles at that time (late 80s/early 90s) than during any other period of her life.

== A Four Loom Weaver ==
The title "A Four Loom Weaver" refers to a power loom worker using four Lancashire Looms (produced either by Horrocks or Howard & Bullough) in a Lancashire weaving shed. The rewritten lyrics for this song refer to the years of the Lancashire Cotton Famine (1861-1865), during which time weavers were totally dependent on mill owners for their income, unlike handloom weavers, who would probably have had a vegetable patch and a few chickens. The Cotton Famine was caused by the cotton trade being interrupted by the American Civil War. A Lancashire man three generations in the mill could not comprehend how the cotton stopped coming in, and still had the quaint belief that the great man (the prime minister, perhaps) only needed to tell the shipowners to bring in some more cotton.

Many Lancashire folk can give personal testimony of relative having worked in such a role.

My maternal grandmother was a four loom cotton weaver until the mill, where she worked, in Rawtenstall, Lancashire, was closed and relocated to India in the 1920s approx. Mill workers worked their way up to four looms which were rented from the mill. Four was the maximum so my nan told me, so a four loom weaver was an indication of the level of attainment in the industry. So I think the title is probably correct and not a corruption of a poor loom weaver.

Will Lever, Malpas, Cheshire

Power weavers would continue to tenter four looms until the mid-1930s, operating at 220 picks a minute. The industry attempted to restructure using the "more looms system," where the weavers were switched to tentering eight looms operating at 180 picks a minute. This caused industrial unrest, and the uneasy compromise of using six loom sets was reached. It was quietly put on hold, but with the curtailed freedoms of the Second World War period most weaving sheds switched to eight. Queen Street Mill ran sets of eight, with a training alley of six and a "pensioners' alley" of 12 loom sets for two elderly weavers to work together. Other mills, such as Bancroft Shed, ran ten-sets.

== Poor Cotton Weaver ==
The Norton version gives an earlier set of words the Poor Cotton Weaver which refers to the hand loom weaving.

Old Billy O' Bent, he were telling us long
We mayn't had better times if I'd nobbut held m' tongue.
Well, I held m' tongue til I near lost m' breath,
And I feel in m' hear that I'II soon clem to death

== Jone o'Grinfilt Junior ==
Aw'm a poor cotton-wayver as mony a one knaws
Aw've nowt t'ate in th' heawse, un' aw've worn eawt my cloas
yo'u hardly gie sixpence fur o' aw've got on
Meh clogs ur' booath baws'n un' stockins aw've none

There is also a version called the Oldham Weaver in Mary Barton, by Mrs Gaskell in 1848.

== Other versions ==
- Oldham Tinkers on "Best O 'T' Bunch" (1974) and "An Introduction To" (2018).
- Karen Casey on "Distant Shore" (2003)
- June Tabor on "Airs and Graces". Not on the original 1976 version but one of 4 tracks added on the 2019 reissue.
- Stick in the Wheel on "Bones" (EP) (2014).
