= Kissing the shuttle =

Using the mouth to rethread a weaver's shuttle

"Kissing the shuttle" is the term for a process by which weavers used their mouths to pull thread through the eye of a shuttle when the pirn was replaced. The same shuttles were used by many weavers, and the practice was unpopular. It was outlawed in the U.S. state of Massachusetts in 1911 but continued even after it had been outlawed in Lancashire, England in 1952. The Lancashire cotton industry was loath to invest in hand-threaded shuttles, or in the more productive Northrop automatic looms with self-threading shuttles, which were introduced in 1902.

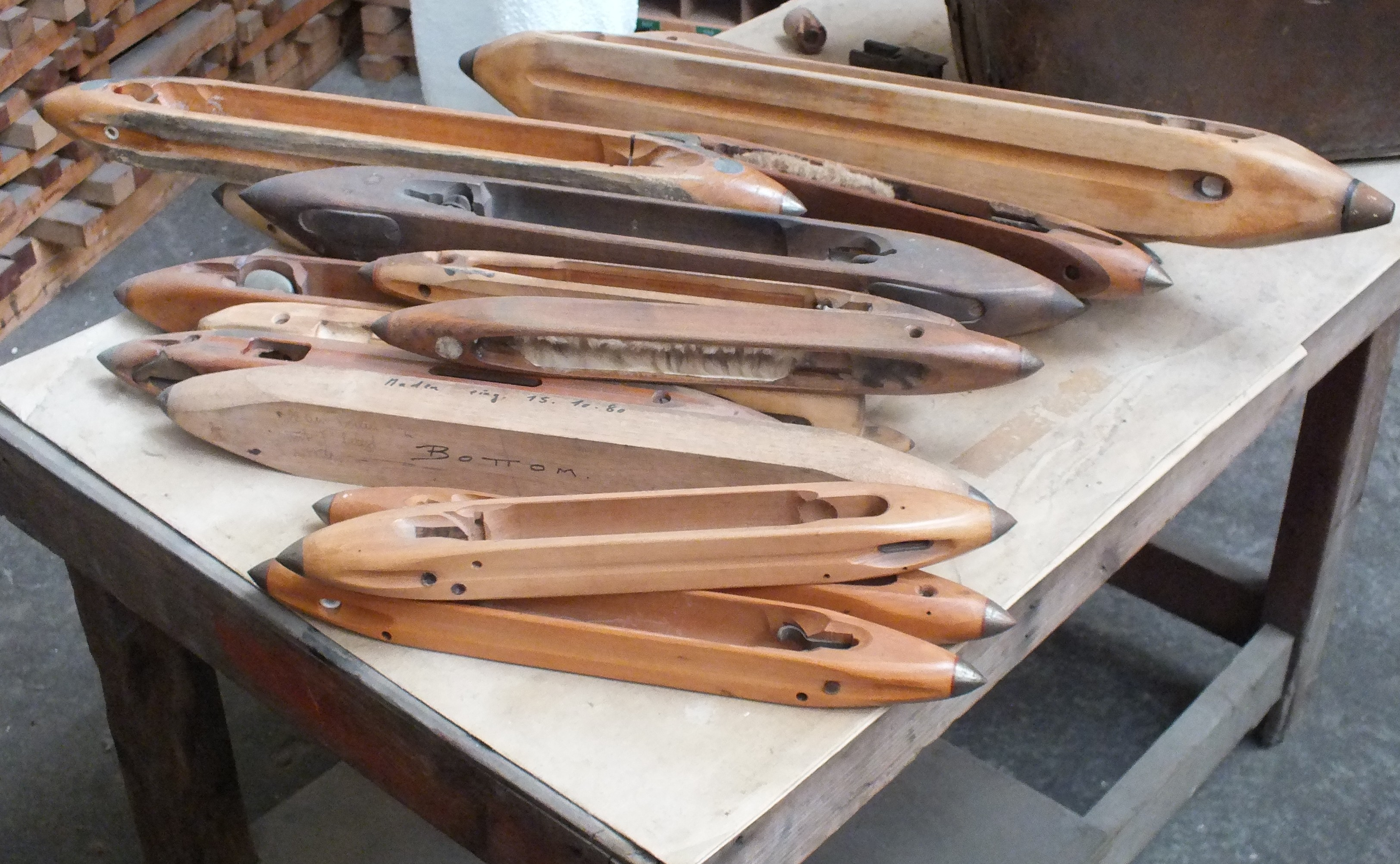
A selection of shuttles and shuttle blanks

== Traditional weaving ==
For 100 years the weaving sheds of Lancashire had been equipped with cast iron constructed looms not dissimilar to the original Roberts loom, invented by Richard Roberts. They were driven by leather belts from line shafts. They were closely packed together in pairs separated a narrow alley. One weaver was responsible for four looms; it was her duty (they were almost always girls or women) to replace the weft in the shuttle when it ran out. The weft was wound onto a removable holder called a pirn which was held in the middle of the shuttle. The weaver stopped the loom, found the shuttle, removed it, and bent the shuttle peg holding the pirn towards her, removed the pirn and replaced it with a fresh one. The shuttle had a hole at the end, known as the eye, through which the weft passed. She placed a loop of thread next to the inside edge of the eye and in an operation called "Kissing the shuttle", sucked it through. The shuttle was ready. It was placed back in the sley, (Note: Sley (slay): the wooden bed on which the shuttle travelled through the warp shed.) All loose threads cut off and removed. A final check was made and the loom was restarted. A typical loom operated at 220 picks per minute (Note: Pick: the number of times the shuttle travelled through the warp shed per minute which translates to the number of rows of thread woven in a minute or the length of the cloth) and the weaver was paid by the piece. (Note: Piece: a defined length of cloth, in 1920 for grey cloth, the piece would have been 100 yards (91 m).) The weaver was adept at balancing her work, keeping all the looms working, so only one would be stopped for replenishment at one time. Labour costs were a significant proportion of the cost of producing cloth.

=== Types of shuttles ===
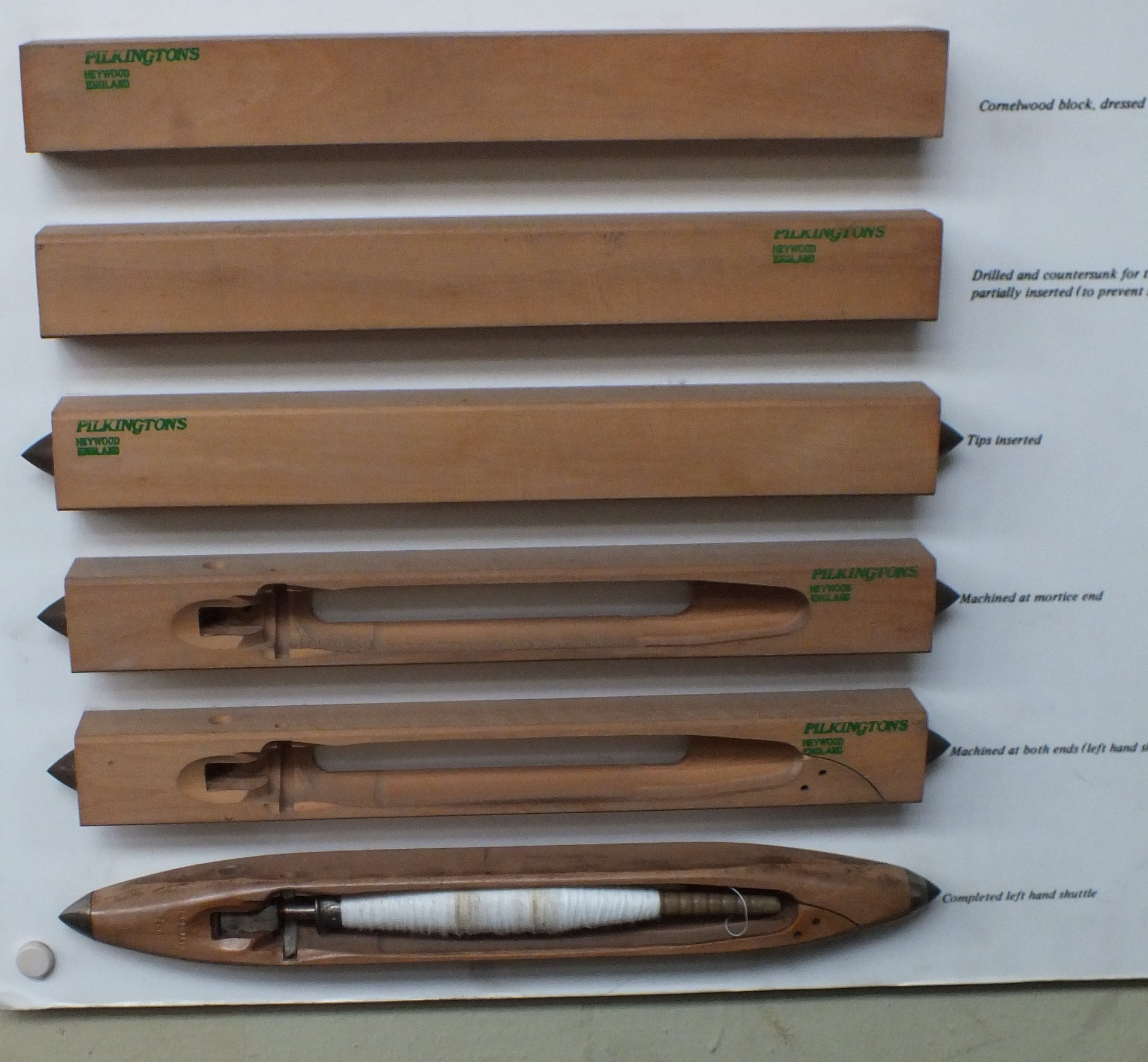
The stages in making a hand-threaded shuttle

Shuttles were constructed from a dense heavy hardwood with metal tips. The wood was traditionally sourced from a box tree. Imported timbers such as persimmon and cornel were also commonly used. The shuttle was shaped and hollowed using conventional wood working techniques, and the metal tips are pressed onto the block. Strips of fox fur or similar were stuck to the inside of a shuttle to stop the thread ballooning as it left the pirn. There are many designs of shuttle. The Pemberton Loom needed a shuttle with a hinged shuttle-peg to hold the pirn; the later Draper loom shuttles clasped metal rings on the head of the pirn using a spring steel clip. The Draper Company claimed it had developed over 5000 different types of shuttle to meet "the needs of the mills and the whims of the weavers".

The eye of the shuttle was often made of porcelain. The thread from the pirn had to be led through the eye before it could be used. The fastest way to do this was to suck it through.

==== Hand-threaded shuttle ====
The eye of this shuttle was not a closed ring. Patented methods were used to enable the weft to be threaded into the eye, the challenges were production cost, maintaining production speed both in the speed it would run and the time needed to thread it and doff it.

==== Self-threading shuttle ====
Metcalfs self threading shuttle was gripped the metal ringed pirn using a spring clip that engaged with the rings. The depleted pirn was then automatically rewound while a new pirn was pressed into the clips and the trailing thread clipped into the complex eye.

== Shuttle kissing ==
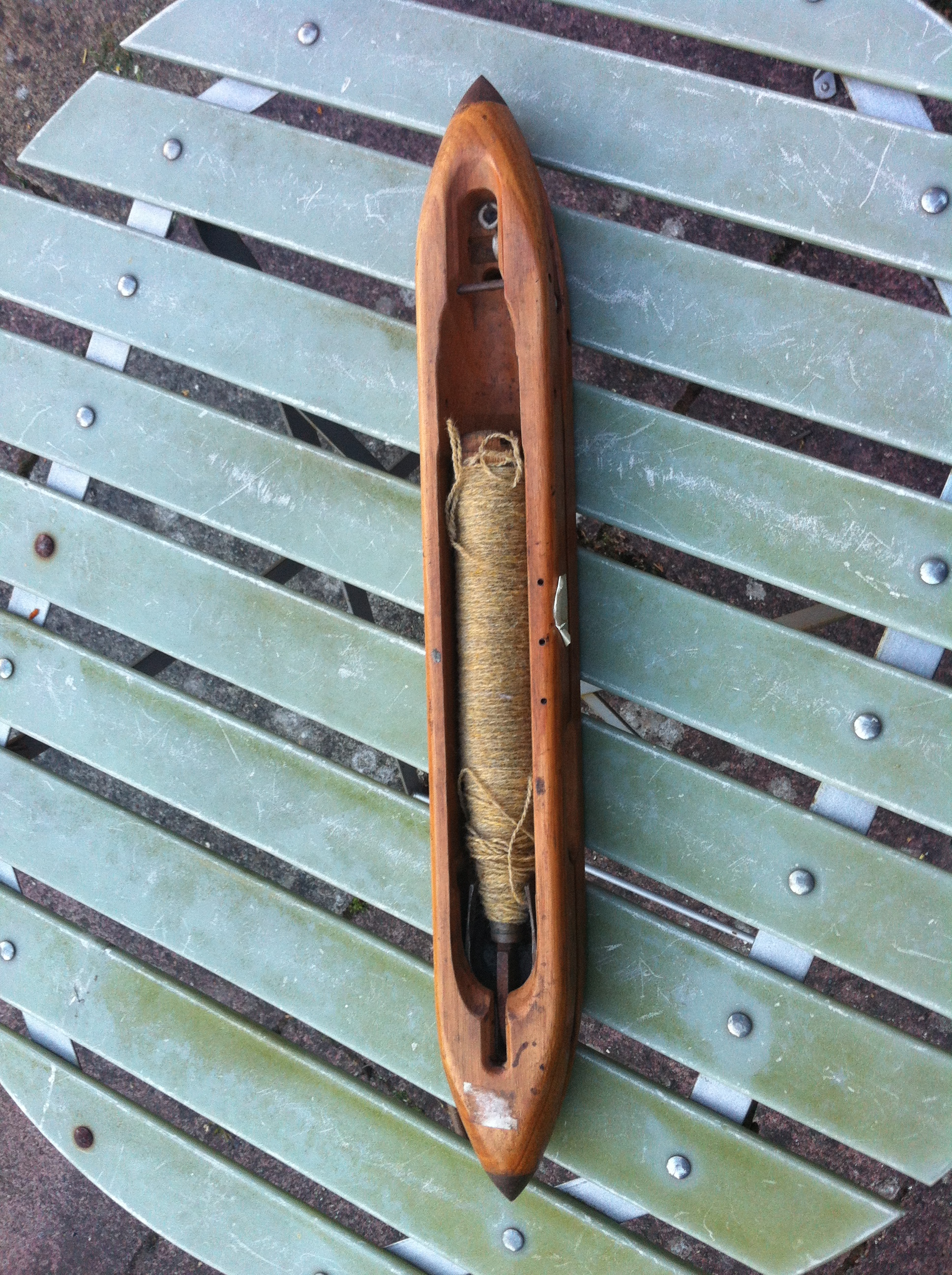
The top view of the shuttle shows the position of the pirn and a number of ceramic ringed eyes leading to short tubes through the body of the shuttle.

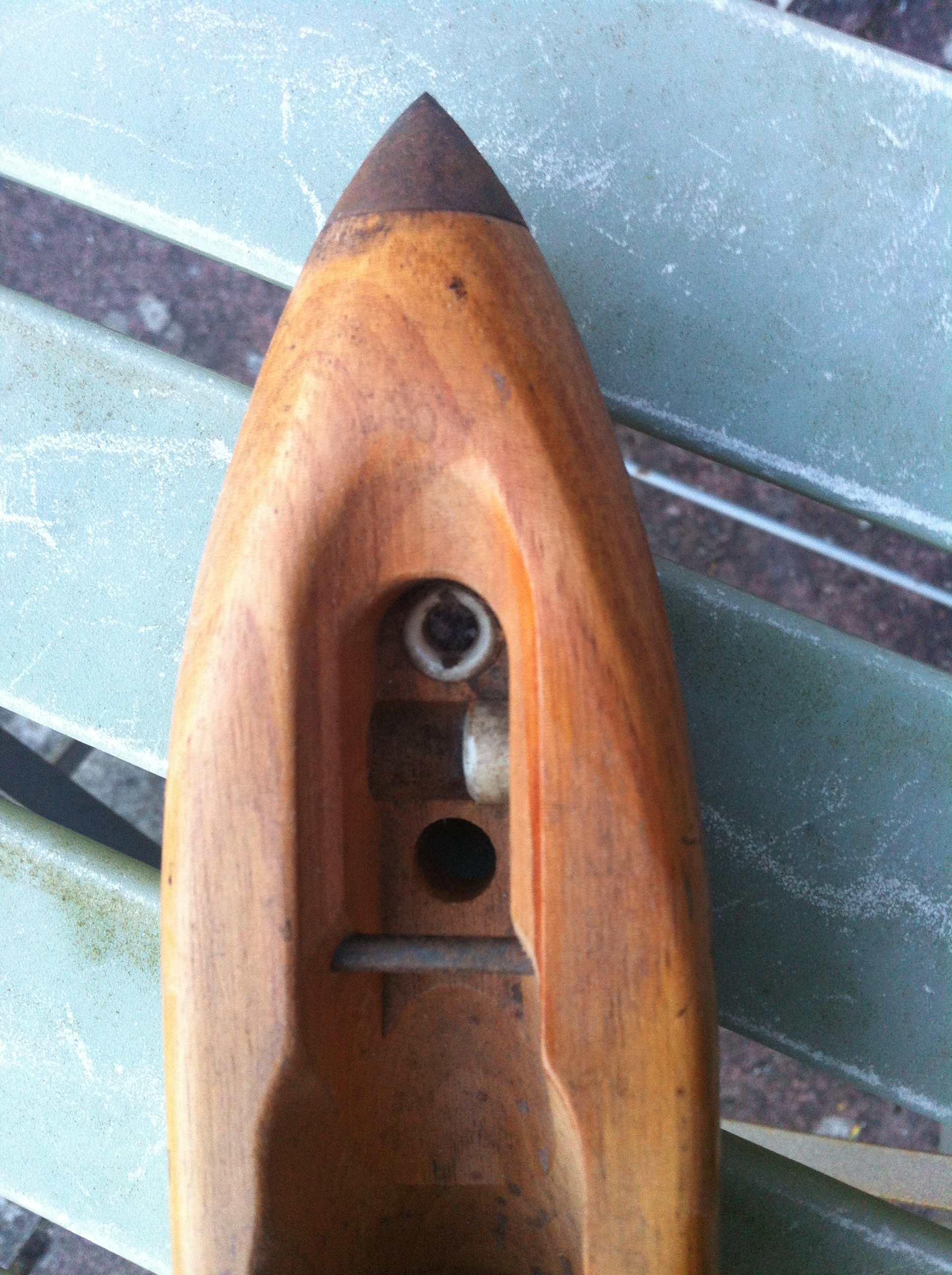
Three eyes are visible. Two lead through to the bottom, one leads to the side.

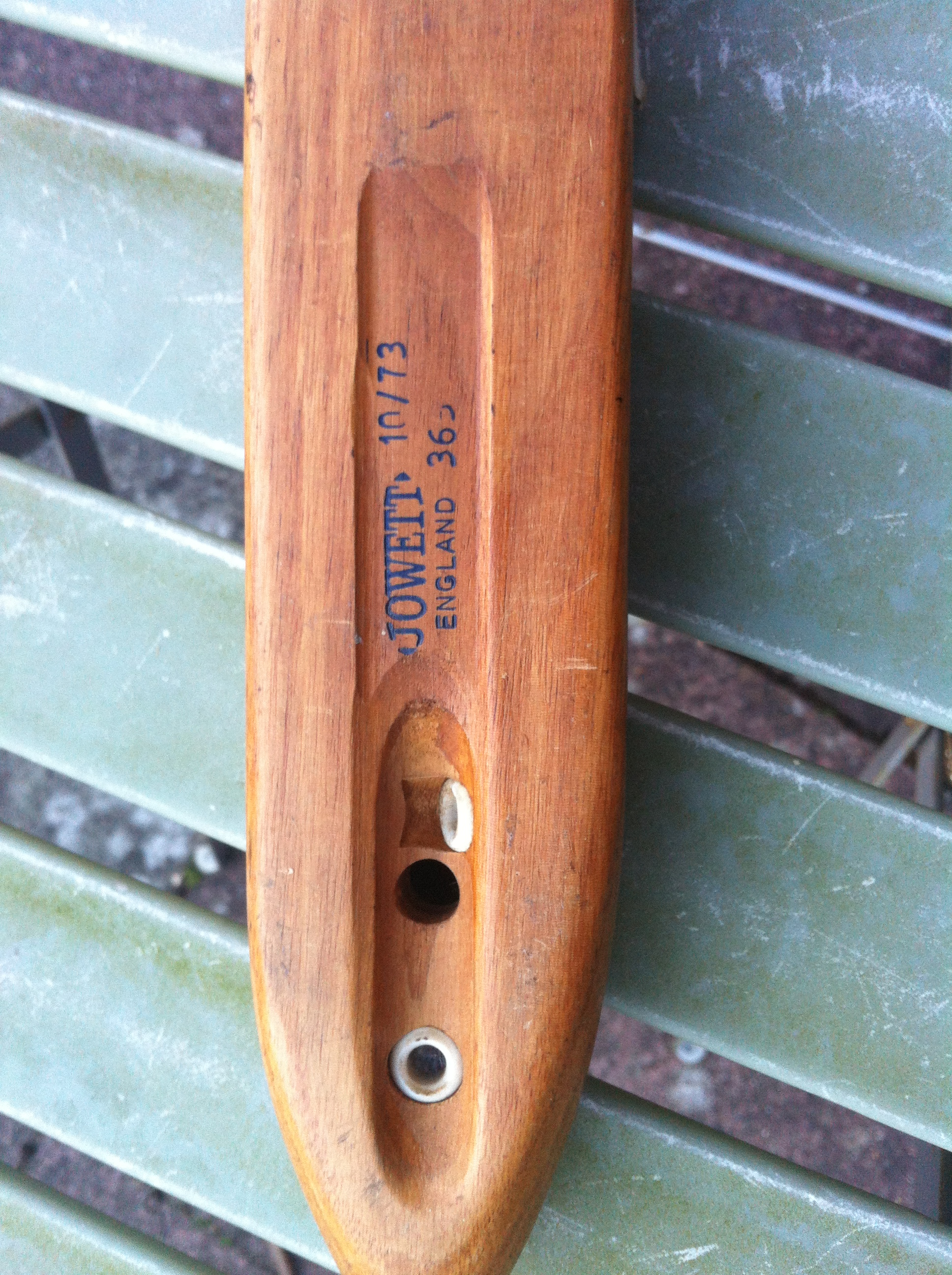
The bottom of the suction shuttle, manufactured and dated by Jowetts in 1973, showing the eyes

Shuttle kissing was widely opposed by weavers who thought it led to byssinosis, a lung disease caused by cotton fibres lodging in the air passages. Shuttles were shared and would be kissed by several weavers and tacklers. They were grimy, and the use of lipstick rendered them sticky. A piece of rabbit fur was a component of the shuttle, harbouring additional pathogens.

In United States, Board of Health physicians agreed that there was a potential risk of spreading disease, and united, persuaded the state legislature in Massachusetts to enact reform. In Lancashire medical opinion remained divided and no legislation was passed.

In 1911, the Amalgamated Weavers' Association enquired of their Lancashire members their objections to the suction shuttle. The main concern was the risk of spreading diseases, followed closely by injuries to teeth and inhaling dirt and dust into their lungs. A Home Office Report of 1912 (Note: B. P. P. 1912-13, [Cd. 6184] xxvi, Report to the Home Office and to the Local Government Board upon an Inquiry into the Alleged Danger of the Transmission of Certain Diseases from Person to Person in Weaving Sheds by means of ‘Shuttle-Kissing’) concluded that kissing shuttles caused no health risk, though it was unsanitary and recommended the self-threading shuttle. Self-threading shuttles became mandatory in 1952, though kissing shuttles were still being manufactured in the 1970s.

=== Tuberculosis ===
Robert Koch discovered the tubercle bacillus in 1882 and this led to a period of 40 years in which the medical professions debated the means of transmission and tried to assimilate this new knowledge into existing practice. Koch's hypothesis was that the bacillus was transmitted by dried sputum on dust particles, while a Dr Charles Chapin, the medical officer for Rhode Island, proposed that close physical contact between people was necessary and spitting and kissing were the primary cause of infection. It was in 1899 that Hermann Biggs, the chief medical officer for New York City determined that transmission was caused by dust or close physical contact.

In Massachusetts, in 1906, it was declared that shuttle kissing was an unwholesome practice because it drew dust cotton lint into the lungs which caused them to spit. This problem was being treated as an occupational health issue as well as one of infectious disease control and this prompted the legislature to act.

In Lancashire, bacteriology was less advanced and in 1900 it was still believed that 'consumption' (tuberculosis) was not an infectious disease and the contagion was due to sanitation or moral laxity.

The 1912 Home Office Report by Messrs Bollhouse Fletcher and Shackleton examined the problem, taking evidence from 58 medical officers in Lancashire. A list of diseases said to arise from shuttle kissing was compiled but close study could only find and document five actual cases. These were a cancer at Oswaldtwistle, tonsillitis at Rawtenstall, three deaths from tuberculosis at Bacup, phthisis at Tyldesley and scarlet fever at Burnley. The three deaths were examined in detail but no link to shuttle kissing was established and other forms of close contact were equally probable. Thus medical officers in Lancashire did not see this problem as within their remit, and were divided on causality.

In 1918, Mr Middleton Hewat, Preston's Tuberculosis Officer and Assistant Medical Officer of Health, saw that weavers had the highest tuberculosis rate of any cotton operatives, and recommended that hand-threaded shuttles should be introduced, while not mentioning the system used in the Northrop automatic loom which were already operated by Horrocks, Crewdson and Sons in Preston. The issue was then discussed by the Parliamentary Shuttle Kissing Committee (Note: SHUTTLE-KISSING (COMMITTEE).HC Deb 27 March 1919 vol 114 cc630-1W 630W § Mr. THOMAS SHAW asked the Home Secretary if he will instruct the superintending inspector of factories in Manchester to call together at an early date the Committee which was discussing the abolition of shuttle-kissing with him when the War broke out? § Mr. SHORTT The superintending inspector has been instructed to call the Committee together again and resume the investigation.) in 1919 who recommended that shuttle kissing should stop but delegated the decision to the individual towns.

The Amalgamated Weavers' Association, ever conciliatory, welcomed the recommendation but suggested that the employers should be given five years to use the old shuttles. The Lancashire Cotton Spinners' and Manufacturers' Association rejected the recommendation as it was the employers' right to conduct their business the way they saw fit, but agreed to recommend the use of hand threaders where there was no economic disadvantage.

The weavers failed to persuade the Secretary of State to use the Factory and Workshop Act 1901 to end the practice, in stark contrast to the alliance of medical and labour activists that promoted the Anthrax Prevention Act 1919 or the action against scrotal cancer.

The 1920s slump and next world war intervened so no action was taken until 1952 when they were banned on the grounds they were no longer economic.

=== Other occupational health issues ===
A further danger was the practice of steaming. To weave cotton, the air had to be moist and weaving sheds were built into the hillside so the structure would remain damp, and additional moisture was added by keeping the floors wet. To keep the air moist in a controlled way, steam pipes at roof height constantly sprayed the air. Lancashire Members of Parliament sought to have steaming stopped through the means of private members' bills with no success. Steaming was discussed and deemed safe by Home Office reports in 1928 and 1929.

== See also ==
- Cotton mill
- Textile manufacturing
