= William Roberts & Co of Nelson =

English manufacturer of steam engines

Coordinates: 53.8358°N 2.2126°W

William Roberts and Company
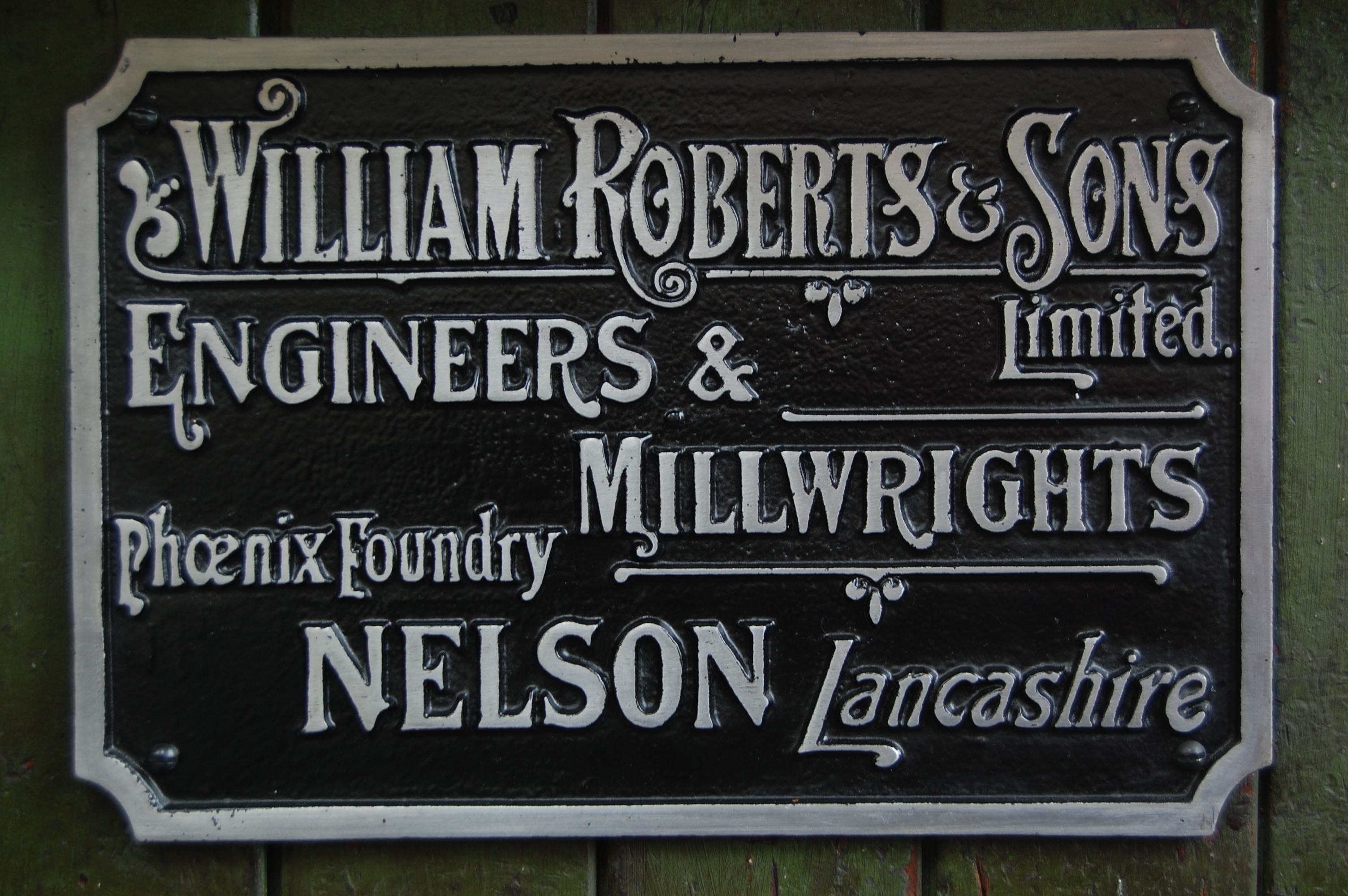
- Makers plate on the engine at Queen Street Mill
- Industry: Heavy engineering
- Defunct: 1959
- Headquarters: Phoenix Foundry, Nelson, Lancashire, England

William Roberts and Company (later William Roberts and Sons) of Phoenix Foundry in Nelson, Lancashire, England, produced many of the steam engines that powered cotton weaving and spinning mills of Pendle and neighbouring districts. Industrial historian Mike Rothwell has called Phoenix foundry “Nelson’s most significant engineering site”.

== William Roberts ==
William was the son of a warper and was born in Burnley in 1833. He was educated first at Burnley Lane Head Elementary school and moved with his parents to Little Marsden (today part of Nelson) and completed his education at Little Marsden National School.

At the age of thirteen he began an apprenticeship at Bridge Foundry, situated in Chapel Street at a site that later became part of Bridge Mills and is where Wavelengths Leisure Centre stands today. Bridge Foundry was started in 1845 by James and John Landless, engineers at Marsland's Burnley Ironworks. After completing his apprenticeship, William left Bridge Foundry and went to work at Burnley Ironworks, then run by Peter and William Marsland.

He was a proponent of the 'Room and Power' system where a mill was built with an engine and various organisations installed their own looms, renting 'Room' for them and 'Power' to run them and was a founder member of the Nelson Room and Power Company.

A Conservative and Freemason, Roberts married Kezia Burrows in 1858 and they had ten sons and two daughters.

== Phoenix Foundry ==
Marsland's ironworks closed in 1861 and William Roberts then returned to Nelson with Peter and William Marsland. In August 1862 they bought a plot of land from J. and J. Walton in Hibson Street and formed a new iron founding business called Marsland, Roberts and Company. They were joined in this venture by Henry Greenwood, John Brennand and James Landless who became the engineer for the new firm. The iron foundry was named Phoenix Foundry and struggled to find work initially due to the impact of the American Civil War and resulting cotton famine. The company did, however, secure contracts for the supply of pumping engines for coal mines and for engines powering Walverden Shed, Nelson and the Entwistle Mill Manufacturing Company.

In 1866 William Marsland died and in 1867 the company was put up for sale or to let in two lots. The business was bought in July 1867 by John Brennand who was a cotton manufacturer at Rake Head Mill in Burnley living at Byerden House. Phoenix Foundry was soon engaged in large contracts, in 1870 building a pair of 'McNaughted' beam engines for Messrs William Lund and Sons at North Beck Mills, Keighley. These beam engines were designed to produce 1,200 horsepower (890 kW), the low-pressure cylinders having a 7 feet (2.1 m) stroke. The Earl of Chesterfield at Burton upon Trent was the source of another large order for a waterworks pumping engine installed at Newton in Makerfield to supply water to Earlestown. Unfortunately, John Brennand was soon in financial difficulties and in September 1871 William Roberts bought the company.

In the early 1880s the business expanded substantially, at its height employing approximately 120. Between 1880 and 1895 Phoenix Foundry built more than twenty medium-sized mill engines of between 300 and 1,000 horsepower (220 and 750 kW). In 1895 this company became a private limited company with capital of £25,000 issued in shares of £5 and around 120 employees and was known as William Roberts and Company Ltd.

Engine building continued until the late 1920s and afterwards the company concentrated on repairs, mill wrighting and general engineering. The foundry closed in 1959 and was later demolished. The site became a bus station and car park.

== Surviving examples ==
Only two Roberts of Nelson steam engines are known to survive, one at Queen Street Mill in Harle Syke, Burnley which ran commercially from 1895 to 1982 and one at Bancroft Mill in Barnoldswick which ran commercially from 1920 to 1978. These two remaining engines are preserved and run under steam for visitors at regular intervals.
