= Cotton Spinners' and Manufacturers' Association =

Cotton Spinners' and Manufacturers' Association was an English employers' organisation. It was active in Lancashire from 1908 to 1961.
