= Tackler =

Supervisor in a textile factory

At Queen Street Mill, Burnley, a tackler is running two Pemberton 'Burnley' Looms, in a six loom set. You see him start the loom by moving the leather drive belt from the idler to the drive wheel and the motion of the loom. He replenishes a shuttle and has both looms working.

A tackler was a supervisor in a textile factory responsible for the working of a number of power looms and the weavers who operated them. The title derived from the job, which was to "tackle" any mechanical problems encountered with the looms in their charge. Invariably male, they had a reputation for gullibility and were the butt of many jokes.
