= Weaving shed =

Originally a single storey mill developed in the 1800s

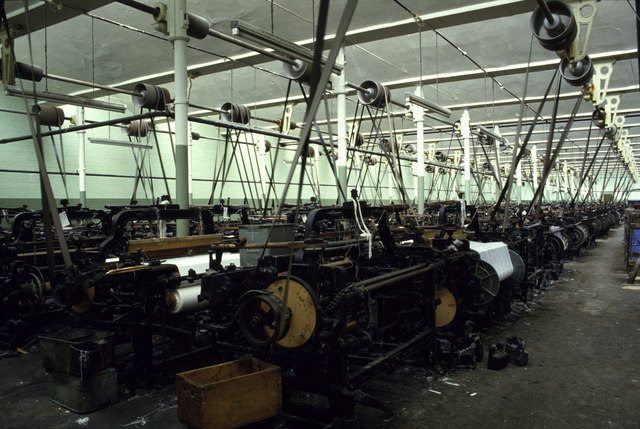
Weaving shed with line shafting attached to upright beams

A weaving shed is a distinctive type of mill developed in the early 1800s in Lancashire, Derbyshire and Yorkshire to accommodate the new power looms weaving cotton, silk, woollen and worsted. A weaving shed can be a stand-alone mill, or a component of a combined mill. Power looms cause severe vibrations requiring them to be located on a solid ground floor. In the case of cotton, the weaving shed needs to remain moist. Maximum daylight is achieved, by the sawtooth "north-facing roof lights".

== History ==
The early textile trade relied on domestic outworking. Handloom weavers would take the yarn to their cottage loom shops, and return the completed fabric to the mill. Reliable power looms that could be worked from an overhead line shaft were not available before Kenworthy and Bulloughs weft stop motion, the roller temple and the loose reed which appeared in the 1840s. The first weaving floors were on the ground floor of the existing narrow mills, where the workpiece was lit by tall exterior windows. The weaving shed appeared around this time. They initially adjoined existing mills, and then were built as standalone mills by speculating investors or by industrial cooperatives of former handloom weavers. Either group would run the looms themselves or operate the shed as a room and power mill. Here as the name suggests, space was rented to other companies who could specialise in weaving without the skills needed to finance, build and maintain a building. Weaving sheds were cheap to build and fireproof having no wooden beams. They were also safer, because their north-facing roof windows meant they were not as dependent on gas-lighting as were spinning mills.

== Function ==
The purpose of a weaving shed was to provide spaces for rows and rows of identical looms. A standard shed would house 1200 looms, and it was common to think in multiples of 400 looms. These looms would be tentered by weavers who worked from four to eight looms each and were paid on piece-rate. The looms would be maintained by a skilled tackler who would be on hand to gait the looms and effect instant repairs or adjustments. There would be four tacklers for 400 looms. The looms were powered by leather belts from overhead cross-shafts, on bevel gears from the line shaft that ran the length of the shed.

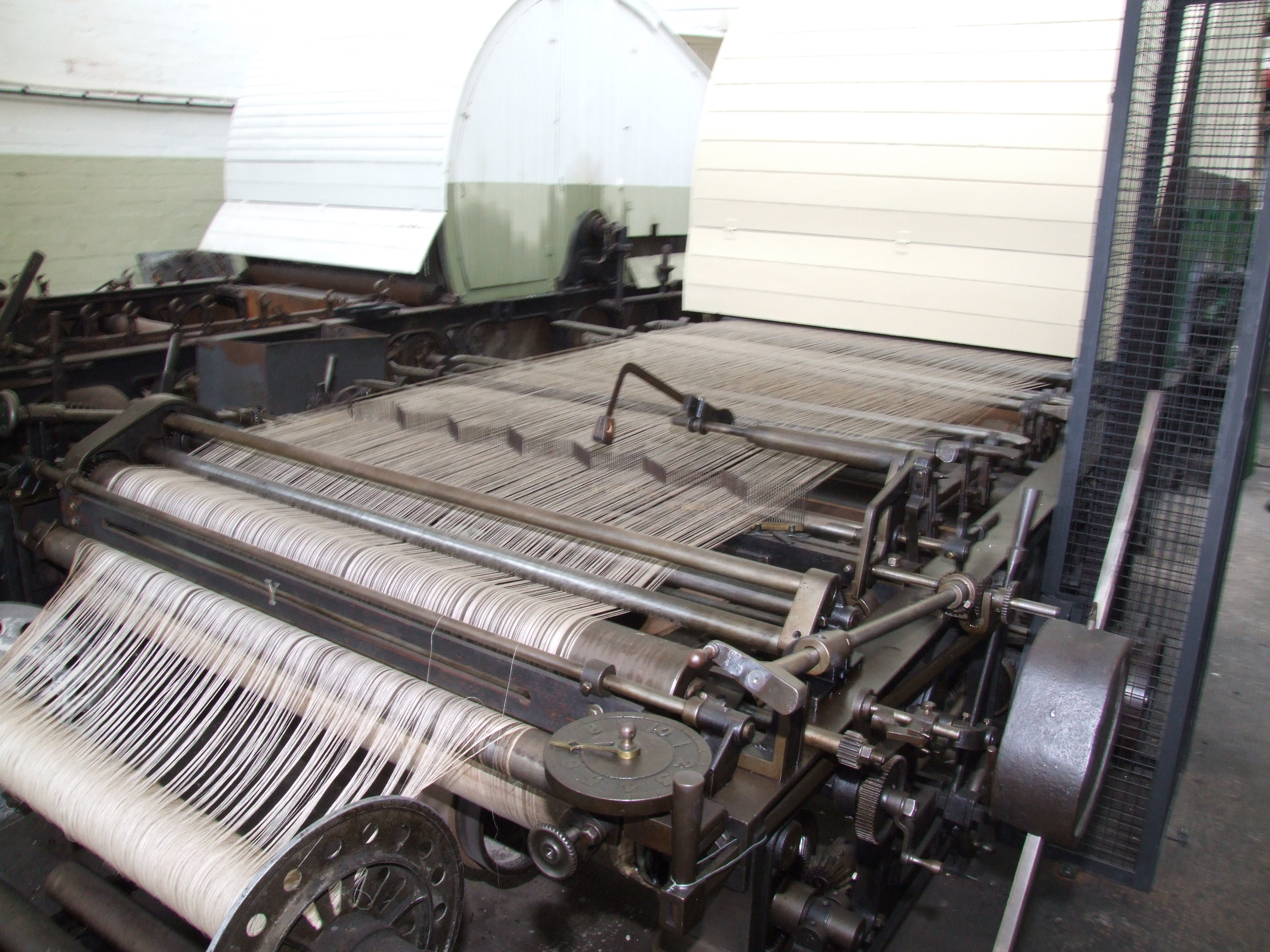
Tape sizing machine

Attached to the weaving shed in a typical mill would be a boiler house where the steam was raised, an engine room housing a stationary steam engine and a two or three-storey building where the preparatory processes were done below and above would be the warehouse. This also housed the offices. Weaving was not possible without a continuous supply of weft on pirns, and beams carrying the warp. Starting with the warp, it had to be warped from creels of thread, in a multistage process onto the weavers' beam. This could be done in the mill or the warp could be bought in and delivered on the tapers beam. The beam of thread had to be sized in a tape sizing machine by sizers.

Each thread had to pass through the correct eye in the heddle, and through the reed. This was done on a drawing-in frame by loomers. The beam, heddles and reed would be carried through into the weaving-shed and gaited to the loom by the tackler.s The pirns used for the weft in the shuttles were wound by a pirner, on a pirning machine in the shed or be bought shuttle ready from the spinners. The completed pieces would be cut off the loom, (it was on a takeup beam), and this left the shed to go back to the warehouse where it would be examined for faults by the cloth looker, and if it was of satisfactory quality, folded and forwarded to the client. The payroll and paper work was done by office staff.

== Construction ==
The early weaving sheds were simple working industrial buildings and the external materials generally used in their construction are robust and there was little in the way of ornamentation. External walls were generally in coursed rubble, stone or brick. The few openings or windows were in simple detailed timber joinery. Internal materials comprised stone flag floors, exposed cast iron structure, timber joinery and boarded partitions and lime plaster on lath soffits to the south facing roof slopes. The sheds were often built into the hillside so the wall would benefit from contact with damp earth that would maintain the moisture levels in the shed required by cotton weaving.

The shed would be modular using a 3m by 6m bay, the beams of the roof being supported by cast iron columns. The ground to beam clearance was 3.5m and the ground to ridge height was 4.6m. Later sheds used a longitudinal beam under the gutter beam eliminating the need for a row of columns, creating a 6m by 6m lattice. The modular nature enable sheds to infill on irregularly shaped sites.

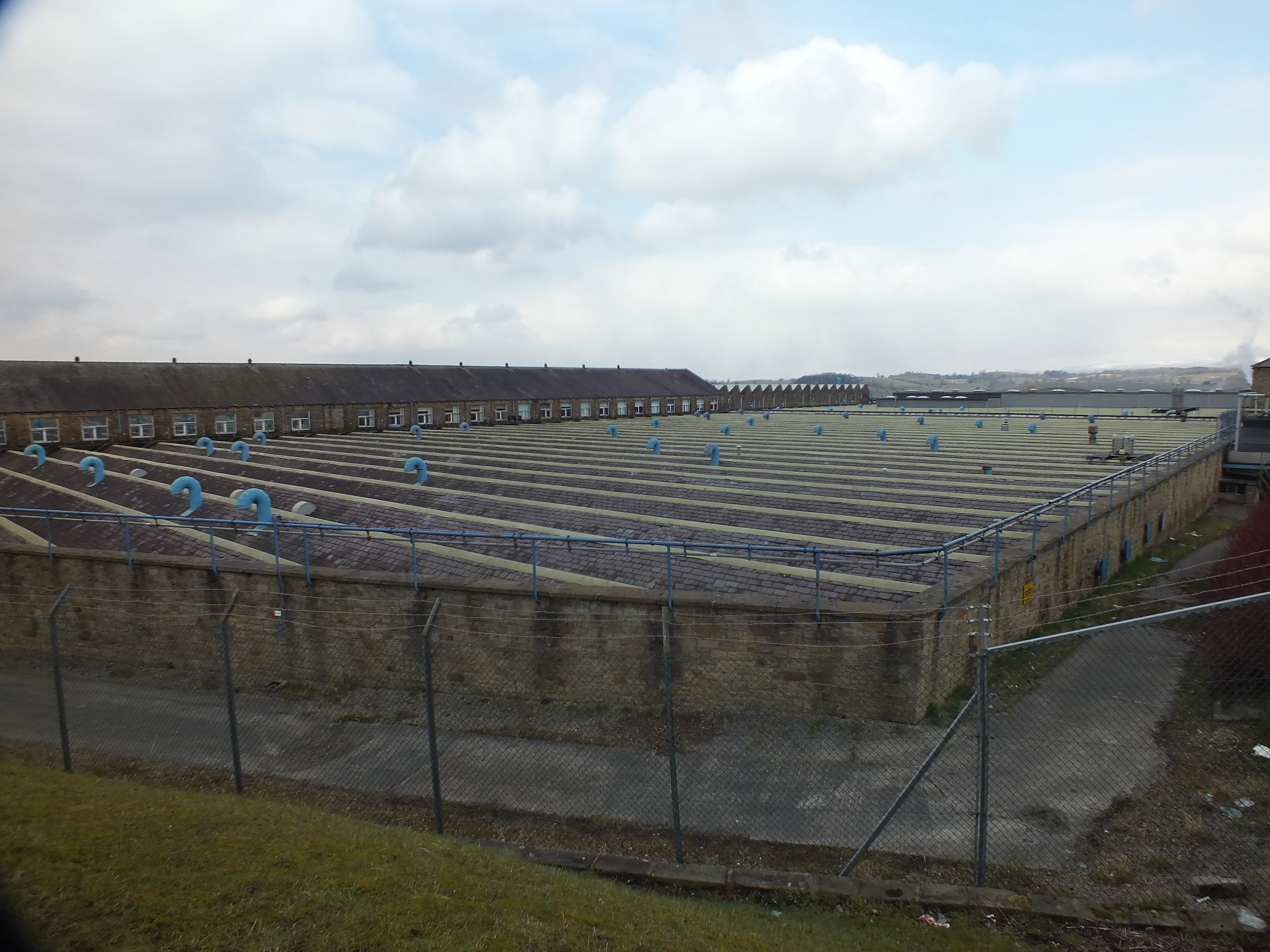
The south-facing common slate roofs at Bankfield Shed, Barnoldswick

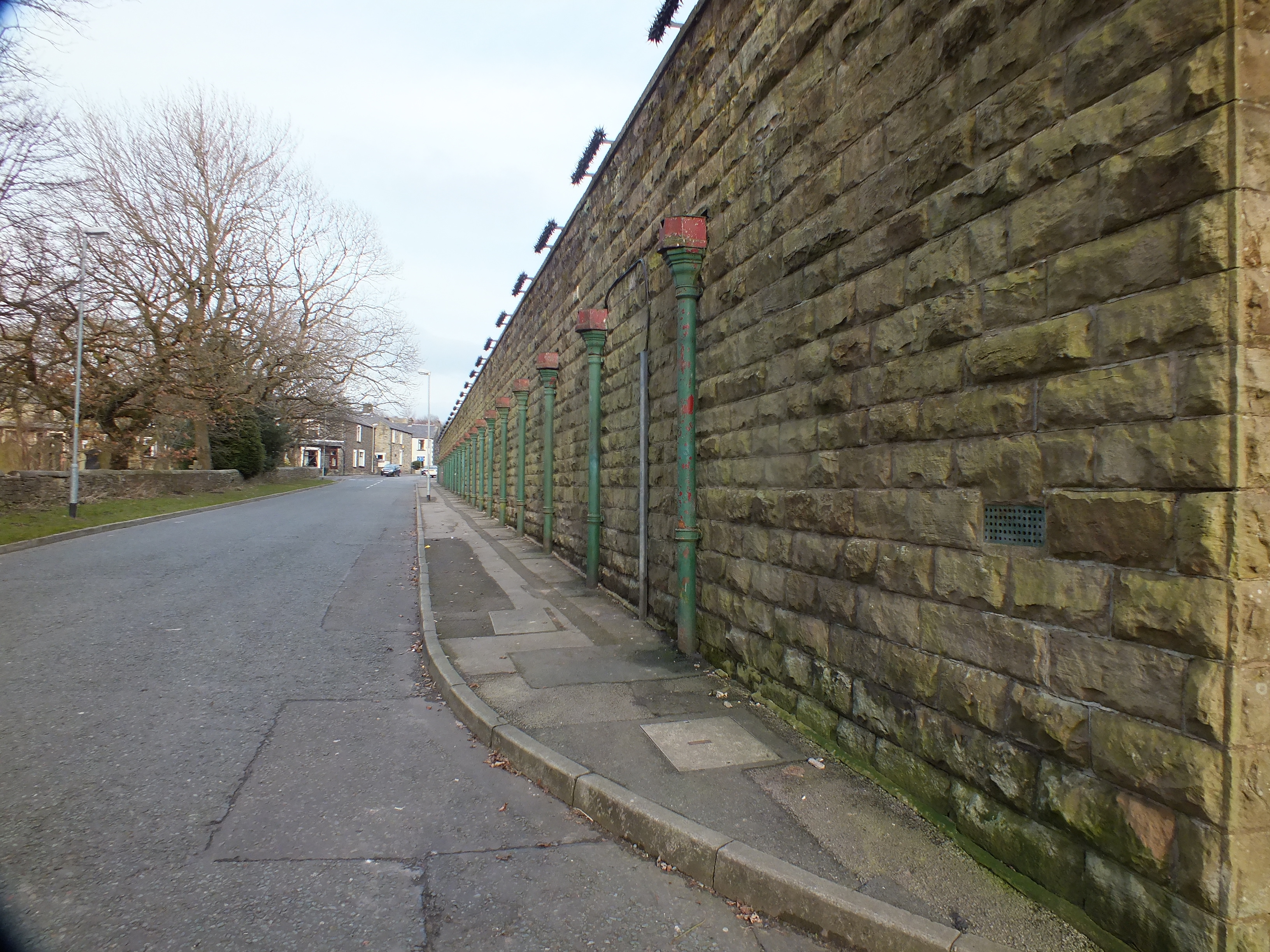
Queen Street Mill, Harle Syke

The north light roofs to the majority of weaving sheds were constructed with simple 30-degree pitched roofs, comprising a simple structure of common rafters with slate roof coverings facing south and glazed lights to the north. The cast iron beams that support these rows of north lights are ingeniously designed as inverted channel sections such that they both carry the load of the roofs and act as rainwater gutters. The rainwater would exit to identical drainpipes on the east and west exterior walls.

The gutter beams were laid flat with joints aligned over column heads. The end of each gutter section has an external flange enabling sections to be bolted together over a bracket to the head of the column. The brackets were designed to collect any resulting leak at the joint and channelled it down the inside of the hollow columns. Cast iron tie rods running from the columnheads, at right angles to the gutterbeams, gave lateral rigidity. The columns were the mounting points for the lineshaft bearings.

=== Regional variations ===
Though the North Light Roof Shed predominated in Lancashire and Yorkshire, there were always variations caused by local needs. In Brazil in the southern hemisphere the south lit roof was more appropriate. Domed vault were used in Leeds, United Kingdom and Issenheim, France but were expensive to build and were dark. Flat roofs on vaults with monitor lights were chosen in Italy, parts of the United States and India because they helped to reduce the heat. Brick vaulting was used in Catalunya, and in settlements that were short of land, two-storey building were erected with the weaving below and the spinning above. Similar two-storey mills were built in 1865 in Angus, Scotland. At Salts Mill in Bradford and in Dundee the power was from below rather than above giving greater headroom while the lace mills of Nottingham and the woollen tweed mills in Roxburghshire had higher roofs to allow for overhead supervision gantries. The Tonnendach mills of central and northern Europe, used a curved broad span with raised transverse rooflights, a system patented by Sequin-Brunner of Switzerland in 1885. Wrought-iron lattice trusses were favoured in France after 1870, while in Ireland the curved light timber Belfast truss was used by Barbour Threads in Hilden, Ulster.

== Restoration and reuse ==
By the 1980s the final weaving companies were woven out (closed), and in a few cases the mills were mothballed. Most however had already been converted for alternative use- and in 2010 a report was written detailing possible ways that the weaving sheds could be renovated and put to alternative uses.

The challenge lies in having 1000 m^{2} of top lit shed with no exterior windows, having structural columns every 3.6m. There are successful schemes which convert the shed into covered parking, and divided retail space, offices and business start up units. When part of the centre is opened up to form an inner court, the bays round the edge have been converted into a primary school, residential units and student accommodation.

== See also ==
- Cotton mill
- Queen Street Mill
