= Drawing-in frame =

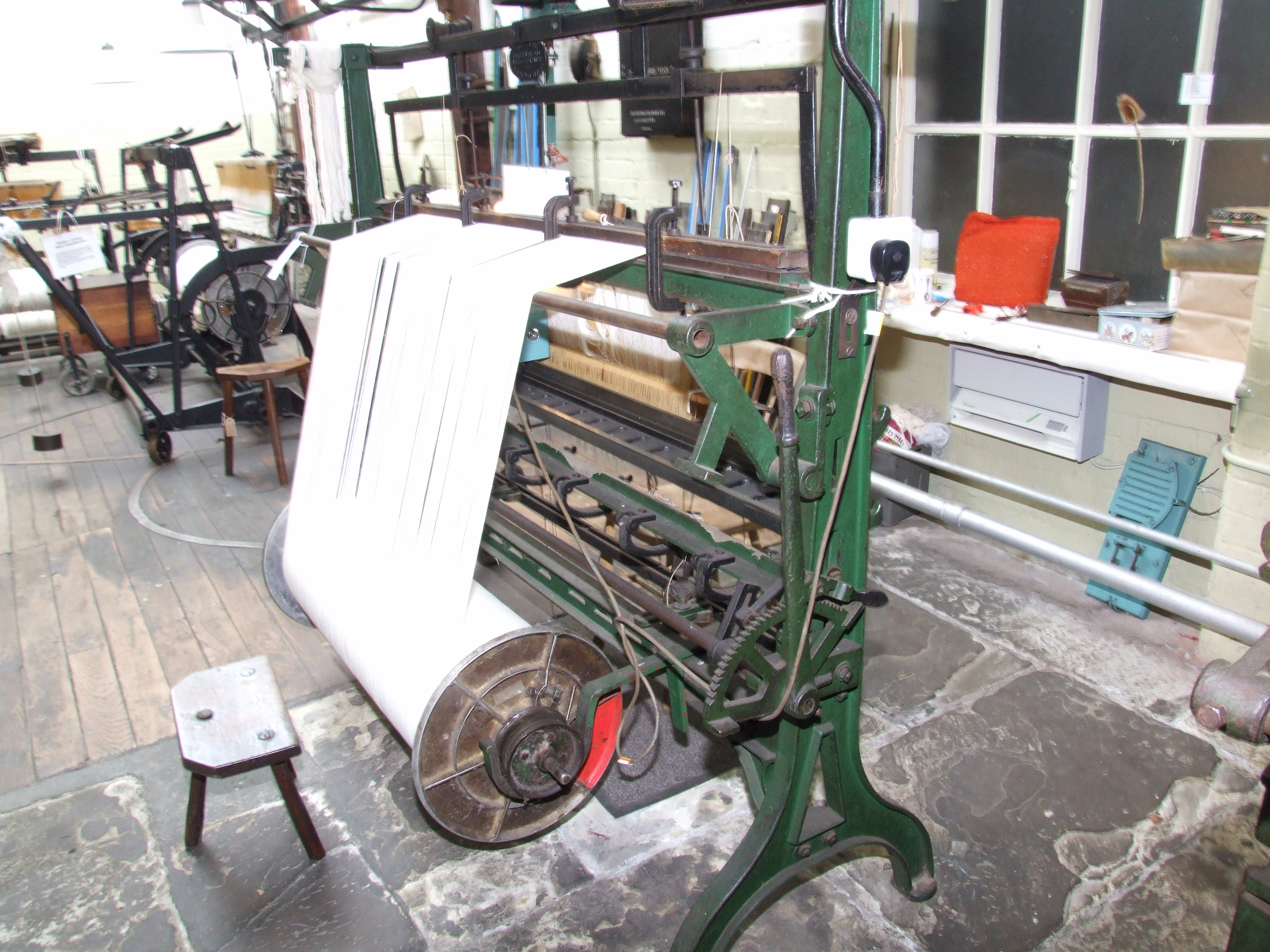
A drawing-in frame at Queen Street Mill

A drawing-in frame was a piece of equipment used in the cotton industry. It was the drawers-in job to thread each of ends on a new beam through the correct healds, and then though the reed. On a Lancashire loom weaving grey cloth, this was a simple but time-consuming task, but for a complex pattern on a Jacquard tapestry loom, great care was needed. To do this, the new beam was mounted on the back of a drawing-in frame, the healds were held next in a vertical position, and in front the reed would be clamped. This job was done by a reacher-in and a loomer. The reacher-in, who would be young and usually a boy, passed each end in order to the loomer, who threaded it through the healds and the reed.

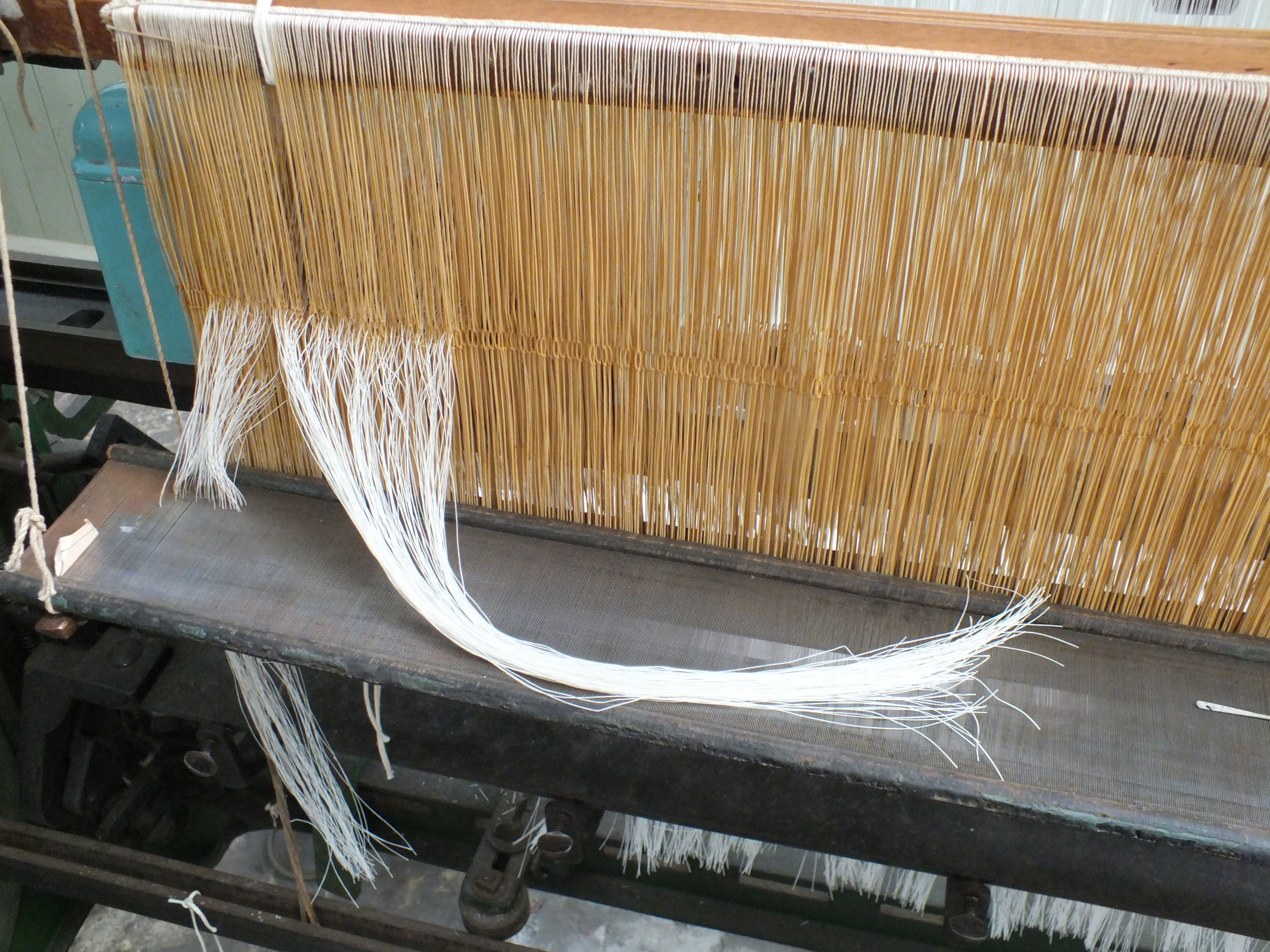
The healds and reeds.

A 'drawer-in' was sometimes referred to as a beamer. The drawers-in sat between the two beams on low three legged stool, head and shoulders at beam height and so surrounded was humorously given the nickname “Yutick’s nest.”
