= Room and power mill =

A room and power mill was a type of textile mill found in Lancashire, England, in the 19th century. Small businesses paid the owner rent for space for their machines and power from the mill engine or waterwheel.

== The system ==
In, for example Nelson, many mills were operated by The Nelson Room and Power Company and the Walverden Room and Power Company. This allowed specialised companies to start up. Such a company may have had 20 dobby looms and just do "fancies".

== Examples ==
- Beehive Mill, Jersey Street, Great Ancoats
- Brownsfield Mill, Great Ancoats
- Vale Mill, Todmorden

== See also ==
- Category:Lists of textile mills in the United Kingdom
- List of mills owned by the Lancashire Cotton Corporation Limited
- List of mills in Rochdale
- List of mills in Oldham

== Bibliography ==
- Ashmore, Owen (1982). The industrial archaeology of North-west England. Manchester University Press. ISBN 0-7190-0820-4.
