= Pirn =

Rod onto which weft thread is wound for use in weaving

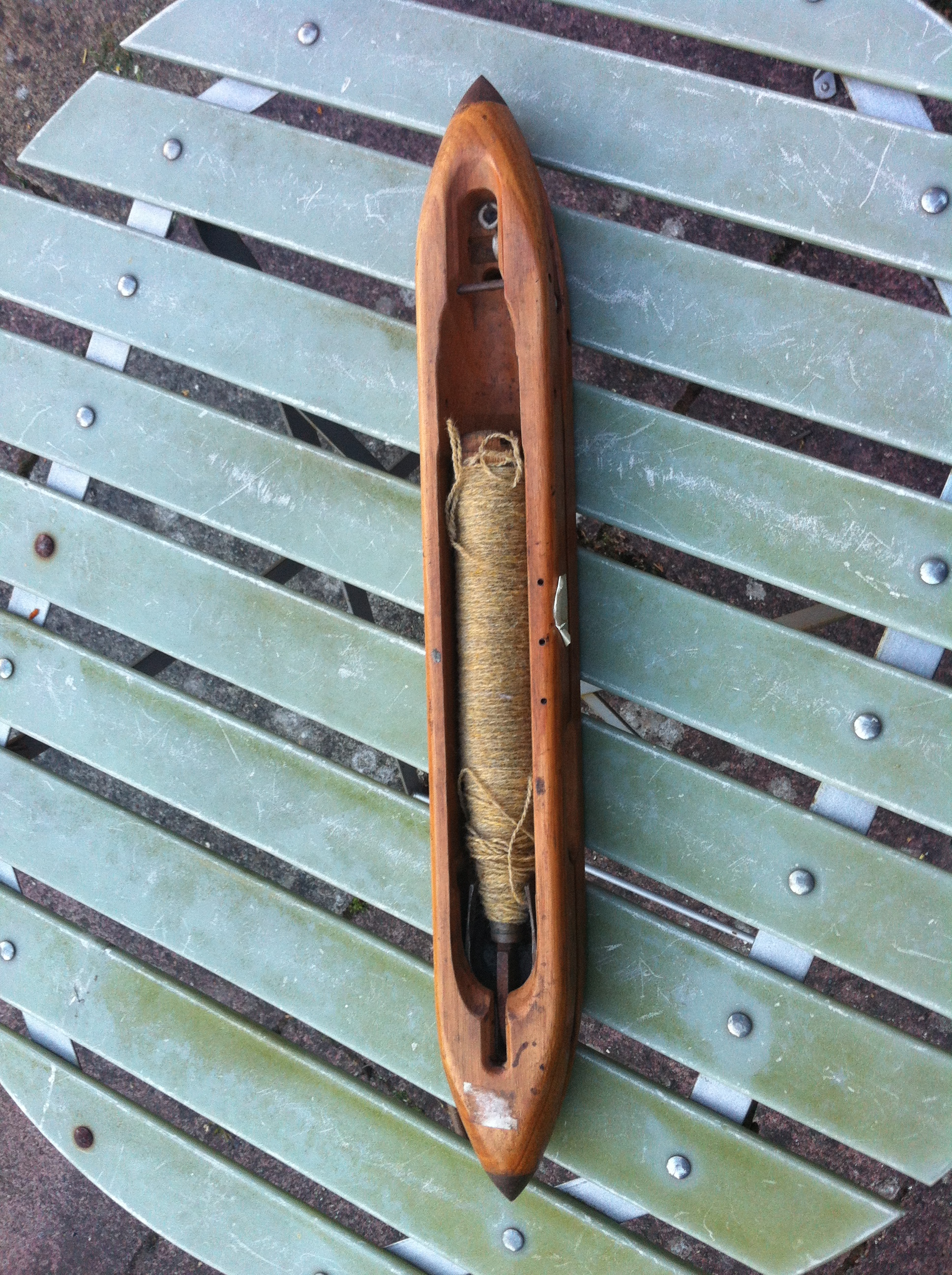
Wool weaving shuttle, with pirn in middle

Pirn winding

A pirn is a rod onto which weft thread is wound for use in weaving. Unlike a bobbin, it is fixed in place, and the thread is delivered off the end of the pirn rather than from the centre. A typical pirn is made of wood or plastic and is slightly tapered for most of its length, flaring out more sharply at the base, which fits over a pin in the shuttle. Pirns are wound from the base forward in order to ensure snag-free delivery of the thread, unlike bobbins, which are wound evenly from end to end.

Pirns became important with the development of the flying shuttle, though they are also used with other end delivery shuttles. Power looms which use pirns generally have automatic changing mechanisms which remove the spent pirn from the shuttle and replace it with a fresh one, thus allowing for uninterrupted weaving.
