= Lancashire Loom =

Semi-automatic power loom (1842)

Two Lancashire looms

The Lancashire Loom was a semi-automatic power loom invented by James Bullough and William Kenworthy in 1842. Although it is self-acting, it has to be stopped to recharge empty shuttles. It was the mainstay of the Lancashire cotton industry for a century.

== John Bullough ==
John Bullough (1800–1868) was from Accrington, often described as a simple-minded Westhoughton weaver. Originally a handloom weaver, unlike others of his trade Bullough embraced new developments such as Edmund Cartwright's power loom (1785). While colleagues were busy rejecting new devices such as in the power-loom riots that broke out in Lancashire in 1826, Bullough improved his own loom by inventing various components, including the "self-acting temple" that kept the woven cloth at its correct width, and a loose reed that allowed the lathe to back away on encountering a shuttle trapped in the warp. Bullough also invented a simple but effective warning device which rang a bell every time a warp thread broke on his loom. Bullough moved to Blackburn and worked with William Kenworthy at Brookhouse Mills, with whom he applied his inventions to develop an improved power loom that later became known as the "Lancashire Loom". He was forced to quit Blackburn, for fear of angry handloom weavers. He later settled in Accrington to form Howard & Bullough in partnership with John Howard at Globe Works in Accrington alongside the Leeds-Liverpool Canal in Accrington. Here he invented the slasher, which founded the company's success. He was one of the country's largest manufacturers. At the height of the business the Globe works employed almost 6000 workers and covered 52 acres (210,000 m^{2}). 75% of production was exported. Howard and Bullough became part of the Textile Machinery Makers Limited group, which were bought out by Platt, and in 1991 the company name changed to Platt Saco Lowell. The Globe works closed in 1993.

== The Loom ==
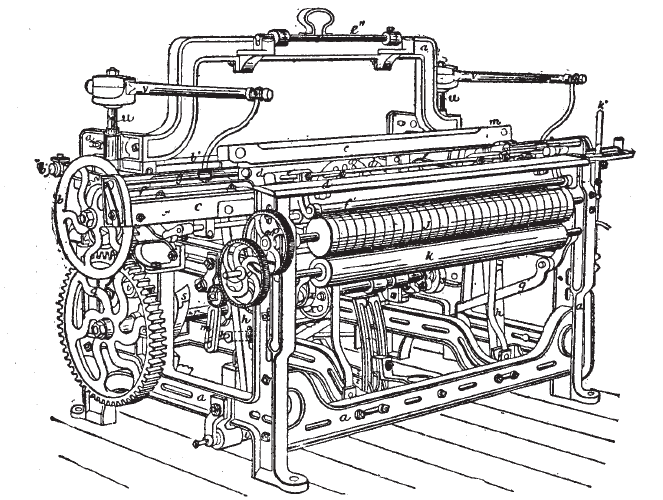
Marsdens:1892 diagram

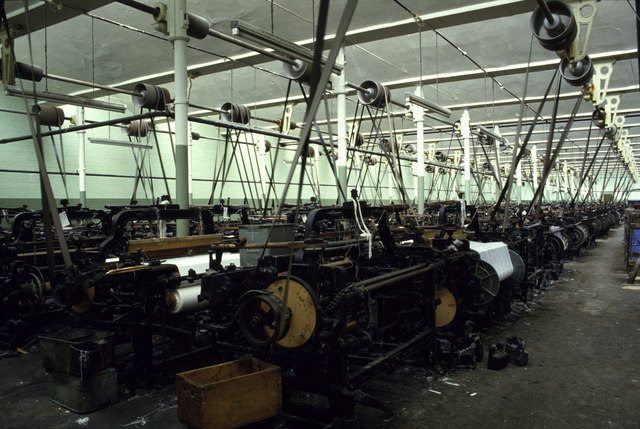
1894 Lancashire Looms (Harling & Todd) still in use at Queen Street Mill, Burnley.

From 1830 there had been a series of incremental improvements to the basic Roberts Loom.

- Richard Roberts 1830, Roberts Loom. These improvements were a geared take up wheel and tappets to operate multiple heddles
- Stanford, Pritchard and Wilkinson – patented a method to stop on the break of weft or warp. It was not used.
- William Dickinson of Blackburn Blackburn Loom the modern overpick loom

There now appear a series of useful improvements that are contained in patents for useless devices

- Hornby, Kenworthy and Bullough of Blackburn 1834 – the vibrating or fly reed
- John Ramsden and Richard Holt of Todmorden 1834 – a new automatic weft stopping motion
- John Bullough of Blackburn 1835 – improved automatic weft stopping motion and taking up and letting off arrangements
- Andrew Parkinson 1836 – improved stretcher (temple).
- William Kenworthy and James Bullough 1841 – trough and roller temple (became the standard), A simple stop-motion.

At this point the loom has become fully automatic, this is the Kenworthy and Bullough Lancashire Loom. The Cartwight loom weaver could work one loom at 120–130 picks per minute- with a Kenworthy and Bullough's Lancashire Loom, a weaver can run up to six looms working at 220–260 picks per minute- thus giving 12 times more throughput. The power loom is now referred to as "a perfect machine", it produced textile of a better quality than the hand weaver for less cost. An economic success. Other improvements were the

- John Bullough 1842 – the loose reed, which doubled the operating speed
- John Sellers 1845 – Burnley Brake, a loom brake
- Blackburn 1852 – Dickinson Loom Modern overpick- or side pick using the cone and bowl that substituted the lever pick. Invented in Dickinson's mill.

=== Movements ===
The three primary movements of a loom are shedding, picking, and beating-up.

- Shedding: The operation of dividing the warp into two lines, so that the shuttle can pass between these lines. There are two general kinds of sheds: "open" and "closed". Open Shed-The warp threads are moved when the pattern requires it-from one line to the other. Closed Shed-The warp threads are all placed level in one line after each pick.
- Picking: The operation of projecting the shuttle from side to side of the loom through the division in the warp threads. This is done by the overpick or underpick motions. The overpick is suitable for quick-running looms, whereas the underpick is best for heavy or slow looms.
- Beating-up: The third primary movement of the loom when making cloth, and is the action of the reed as it drives each pick of weft to the fell of the cloth.

== Economics ==
The principal advantage of the Lancashire loom was that it was semi-automatic, when a warp thread broke the weaver was notified. When the shuttle ran out of thread, the machine stopped. An operative thus could work 4 or more looms whereas previously they could only work a single loom. Indeed, the term A Four Loom Weaver was used to describe the operatives. Labour cost was quartered. In some mills an operative would operate 6 or even 8 looms, although that was governed by the thread being used. By 1900, the loom was challenged by the Northrop Loom, which was fully automatic and could be worked in larger numbers. The Northrop was suitable for coarse thread but for fine cotton, the Lancashire loom was still preferred. By 1914, Northrop looms made up 40% of looms in American mills, but in the United Kingdom labour costs were not as significant and they only supplied 2% of the British market.
