= Power loom =

Mechanised loom powered by a line shaft

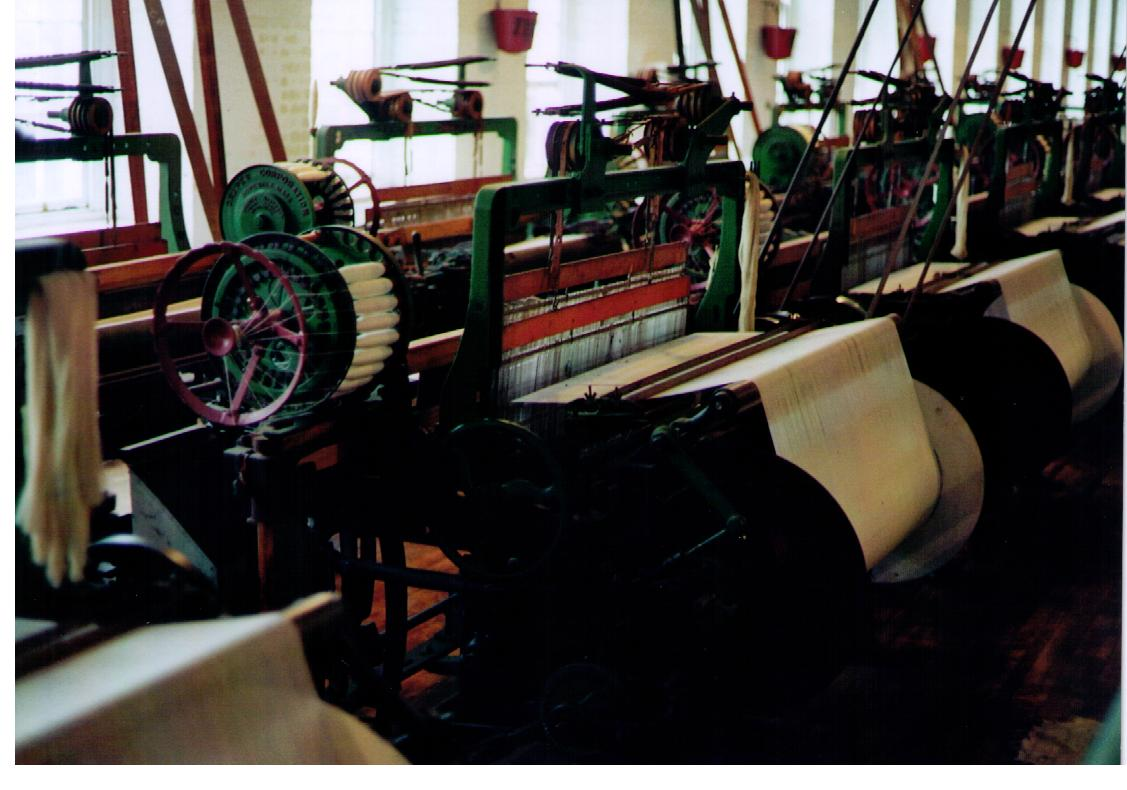
A Northrop loom manufactured by Draper Corporation in the textile museum, Lowell, Massachusetts

A power loom is a mechanized loom that automates the weaving of cloth through leveraging mechanical power. It interlaces warp and weft threads via mechanisms like cams, gears, levers, and pulleys, replicating motions previously done manually. The mechanization of weaving dramatically increased production efficiency, contributing to the rise of large-scale textile factories during the Industrial Revolution.

Though the idea is older and experimentation predates him, Edmund Cartwright is credited with initiating power loom development with his 1785 patent. His initial versions were rudimentary but they pioneered automated weaving and laid the groundwork for factory-based production. By the early 19th century, improvements had made power looms reliable and widely adopted across Europe and North America, ushering in a new era of textile manufacturing. Cartwright’s invention marked the beginning of mechanized weaving, drastically reducing reliance on skilled handweavers.

== Shuttle looms ==
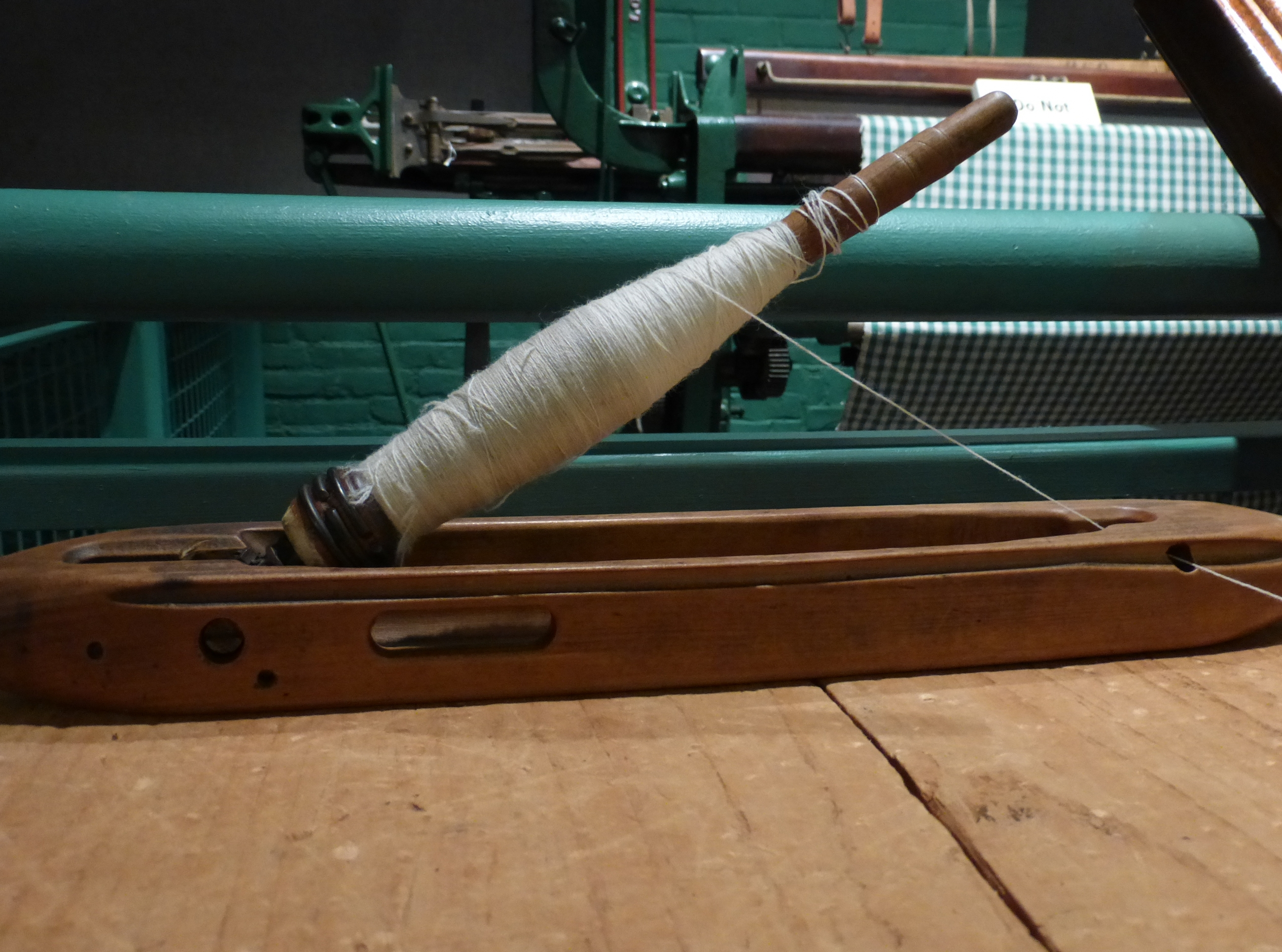
Shuttle with pirn

Shuttle loom operations: shedding, picking and battening

The main components of the loom are the warp beam, heddles, harnesses, shuttle, reed, and takeup roll. In the loom, yarn processing includes shedding, picking, battening and taking-up operations.

- Shedding. Shedding is the raising of the warp yarns to form a loop through which the filling yarn, carried by the shuttle, can be inserted. The shed is the vertical space between the raised and unraised warp yarns. On the modern loom, simple and intricate shedding operations are performed automatically by the heddle or heald frame, also known as a harness. This is a rectangular frame to which a series of wires, called heddles or healds, are attached. The yarns are passed through the eye holes of the heddles, which hang vertically from the harnesses. The weave pattern determines which harness controls which warp yarns, and the number of harnesses used depends on the complexity of the weave. Two common methods of controlling the heddles are dobbies and a Jacquard Head.
- Picking. As the harnesses raise the heddles or healds, which raise the warp yarns, the shed is created. The filling yarn is inserted through the shed by a small carrier device called a shuttle. The shuttle is normally pointed at each end to allow passage through the shed. In a traditional shuttle loom, the filling yarn is wound onto a quill, which in turn is mounted in the shuttle. The filling yarn emerges through a hole in the shuttle as it moves across the loom. A single crossing of the shuttle from one side of the loom to the other is known as a pick. As the shuttle moves back and forth across the shed, it weaves an edge, or selvage, on each side of the fabric to prevent the fabric from raveling.
- Battening. As the shuttle moves across the loom laying down the fill yarn, it also passes through openings in another frame called a reed (which resembles a comb). With each picking operation, the reed presses or battens each filling yarn against the portion of the fabric that has already been formed. The point where the fabric is formed is called the fell. Conventional shuttle looms can operate at speeds of about 150 to 200 picks per minute

With each weaving operation, the newly constructed fabric must be wound on a cloth beam. This process is called taking up. At the same time, the warp yarns must be let off or released from the warp beams. To become fully automatic, a loom needs a filling stop motion which will brake the loom, if the weft thread breaks.

== Operation ==
Operation of weaving in a textile mill is undertaken by a specially trained operator known as a weaver. Weavers are expected to uphold high industry standards and are tasked with monitoring anywhere from ten to as many as thirty separate looms at any one time. During their operating shift, weavers will first utilize a wax pencil or crayon to sign their initials onto the cloth to mark a shift change, and then walk along the cloth side (front) of the looms they tend, gently touching the fabric as it comes from the reed. This is done to feel for any broken "picks" or filler thread. Should broken picks be detected, the weaver will disable the machine and undertake to correct the error, typically by replacing the bobbin of filler thread in as little time as possible. They are trained that, ideally, no machine should stop working for more than one minute, with faster turnaround times being preferred.

== History ==
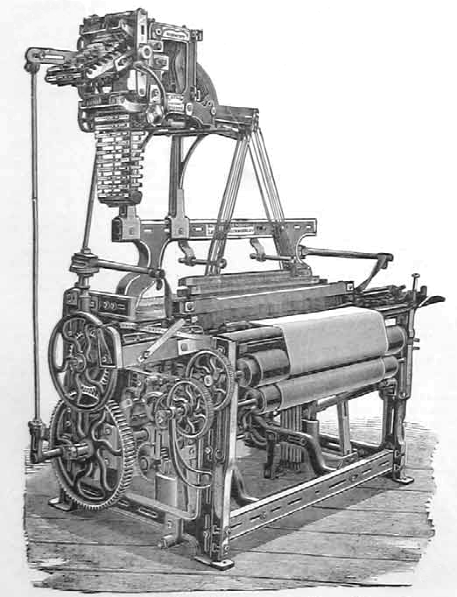
A loom from the 1890s with a dobby head. Illustration from the Textile Mercury.

The first ideas for an automatic loom had been developed in 1684 by M. de Gennes in Paris and by Vaucanson in 1745, but were forgotten. In 1785, Edmund Cartwright patented an early power loom, which was initially hand-operated and mechanically crude. By 1787 he had developed improved versions driven by water power, and soon after he had coupled looms to steam power, marking an important step toward fully mechanized weaving. His ideas were licensed first by Grimshaw of Manchester who built a small steam-powered weaving factory in Manchester in 1790, but the factory burnt down. Cartwright's was not a commercially successful machine; his looms had to be stopped to dress the warp. Over the next decades, Cartwright's ideas were modified into a reliable automatic loom. These designs followed John Kay's invention of the flying shuttle, and they passed the shuttle through the shed using levers. With the increased speed of weaving, weavers were able to use more thread than spinners could produce.

=== Series of initial inventors ===
A series of inventors incrementally improved all aspects of the three principal processes and the ancillary processes.

- Grimshaw of Manchester (1790): dressing the warp
- Austin (1789, 1790): dressing the warp, 200 looms produced for Monteith of Pollockshaws 1800
- Thomas Johnson of Bredbury (1803): dressing frame, factory for 200 steam looms in Manchester in 1806, and two factories at Stockport in 1809. One at Westhoughton, Lancashire (1809).
- William Radcliffe of Stockport (1802): improved take up mechanism
- John Todd of Burnley (1803): a heald roller and new shedding arrangements, the healds were corded to treadles actuated by cams on the second shaft.
- William Horrocks of Stockport (1803): The frame was still wooden but the lathe was pendant from the frame and operated by cams on the first shaft, the shedding was operated by cams on the second shaft, the take up motion was copied from Radcliffe.
- Joseph Marie Jacquard (1804): invented the Jacquard loom, which used punched cards to automatically control warp threads, enabling complex patterned weaving on power looms.
- Peter Marsland (1806): improvements to the lathe motion to counteract poor picking
- William Cotton (1810): improvements to the letting off motion
- William Horrocks (1813): Horrocks loom, modifications to the lathe motion, improving on Marsland
- Peter Ewart (1813): a use of pneumatics
- Joseph and Peter Taylor (1815): double beat foot lathe for heavy cloths
- Paul Moody (1815): produces the first power loom in North America. Exporting a UK loom would have been illegal.
- John Capron and Sons (1820): installed the first power looms for woolens in North America at Uxbridge, Massachusetts.
- William Horrocks (1821): a system to wet the warp and weft during use, improving the effectiveness of the sizing
- Richard Roberts (1830): Roberts Loom, These improvements were a geared take up wheel and tappets to operate multiple heddles
- Stanford, Pritchard and Wilkinson: patented a method to stop on the break of weft or warp. It was not used.
- William Dickinson of Blackburn: Blackburn Loom, the modern overpick

=== Further useful improvements ===
There now appear a series of useful improvements that further mechanized the power loom:

- Hornby, Kenworthy and Bullough of Blackburn (1834): the vibrating or fly reed
- John Ramsbottom and Richard Holt of Todmorden (1834): a new automatic weft stopping motion
- James Bullough of Blackburn (1835): improved automatic weft stopping motion and taking up and letting off arrangements
- Andrew Parkinson (1836): improved stretcher (temple).
- William Kenworthy and James Bullough (1841): trough and roller temple (became the standard), A simple stop-motion.
- The Lancashire Loom (1842): developed by Kenworthy and Bullough into a robust, semi-automatic loom system that became the dominant standard throughout the following decades, enabling one worker to tend four or more looms simultaneously.

At this point the loom had become automatic except for refilling weft pirns. The Cartwright loom weaver could work one loom at 120-130 picks per minute—with a Kenworthy and Bullough's Lancashire Loom, a weaver can run four or more looms working at 220-260 picks per minute—thus giving eight (or more) times more throughput.

- James Henry Northrop (1894) invented a self-threading shuttle and shuttle spring jaws to hold a bobbin by means of rings on the butt. This paved the way to his automatic filling and changing battery of 1891, the basic feature of the Northrop Loom. The principal advantage of the Northrop loom was that it was fully automatic; when a warp thread broke, the loom stopped until it was fixed. When the shuttle ran out of thread, Northrop's mechanism ejected the depleted pirn and loaded a new full one without stopping. A loom operative could work 16 or more looms whereas previously they could only operate eight. Thus, the labor cost was halved. Mill owners had to decide whether the labor saving was worth the capital investment in a new loom. In all 700,000 looms were sold. By 1914, Northrop looms made up 40% of American looms. Northrop was responsible for several hundred weaving related patents.
- George Hattersley and Sons (1921): the Hattersley Standard Loom — a robust, well-engineered “standard model” loom that sold in the thousands and became widely used looms for worsted, woollen and mixed-fiber weaving.
- Sakichi Toyoda (1924) unveiled the Type G automatic loom which combined a high-speed, non-stop shuttle change with integrated stop-motions and safety devices. This loom achieved the world's highest productivity and textile quality at the time, allowing workers to operate 30 to 50 looms simultaneously and was later licensed internationally, including to the Platt Brothers in the United Kingdom.

== Looms and the Manchester context ==
The development of the power loom in and around Manchester was not a coincidence. Manchester had been a centre for Fustians by 1620 and acted as a hub for other Lancashire towns, so developing a communication network with them. It was an established point of export using the meandering River Mersey, and by 1800 it had a thriving canal network, with links to the Ashton Canal, the Rochdale Canal, the Peak Forest Canal and the Manchester, Bolton and Bury Canal. The fustian trade gave the towns a skilled workforce that was used to the complicated Dutch looms, and was perhaps accustomed to industrial discipline. While Manchester became a spinning town, the towns around were weaving towns producing cloth by the putting out system. The business was dominated by a few families, who had the capital needed to invest in new mills and to buy hundreds of looms. Mills were built along the new canals, so immediately had access to their markets. Spinning developed first and, until 1830, the handloom was still more important economically than the power loom when the roles reversed. Because of the economic growth of Manchester, a new industry of precision machine tool engineering was born and here were the skills needed to build the precision mechanisms of a loom.

=== Adoption ===
Number of Looms in UK
Year	1803	1820	1829	1833	1857
Looms	2,400	14,650	55,500	100,000	250,000

Draper's strategy was to standardize on a couple of Northrop Loom models which it mass-produced. The lighter E-model of 1909 was joined in the 1930s by the heavier X-model. Continuous fibre machines, say for rayon, which was more break-prone, needed a specialist loom. This was provided by the purchase of the Stafford Loom Co. in 1932, and using their patents a third loom the XD, was added to the range. Because of their mass production techniques they were reluctant and slow to retool for new technologies such as shuttleless looms.

=== Decline and reinvention ===
Originally, power looms used a shuttle to throw the weft across, but in 1927 the faster and more efficient shuttleless loom came into use. Sulzer Brothers, a Swiss company had the exclusive rights to shuttleless looms in 1942, and licensed the American production to Warner & Swasey. Draper licensed the slower rapier loom. Today, advances in technology have produced a variety of looms designed to maximise production for specific types of material. The most common of these are Sulzer shuttleless weaving machines, rapier looms, air-jet looms and water-jet looms.

== Social and economic implications ==
Power looms reduced demand for skilled handweavers, initially causing reduced wages and unemployment. Protests followed their introduction. For example, in 1816 two thousand rioting Calton weavers tried to destroy power loom mills and stoned the workers. In 1826, the power-loom riots erupted in Lancashire, England, sparked by disgruntled handloom weavers.

In the longer term, by making cloth more affordable the power loom increased demand and stimulated exports, causing a growth in industrial employment, albeit low-paid. The power loom also opened up opportunities for women mill workers. A darker side of the power loom's impact was the growth of employment of children in power loom mills.

== Dangers ==
There are a number of inherent dangers in the machines, to which inattentive or poorly trained weavers can fall victim. The most obvious is the moving reed, the frames which hold the heddles and the "pinch" or "sand" roll utilized to keep the cloth tight as it passes over the front of the machine and onto the doff roll. The most common injury in weaving is pinched fingers from distracted or bored workers, though this is not the only such injury found. There are numerous accounts of weavers with long hair getting it tangled in the warp itself and having their scalp pulled away from the skull, or large chunks of hair pulled off. As a result of this, it has become industry standard for companies to require weavers to either keep hair up and tied, or to keep their hair short so as not to allow it to become tangled. Also, due to possible pinch points on the front of machines, loose, baggy clothing is prohibited. In addition, there is a risk of the shuttle flying out of the loom at a high-speed (200+ mph/322 kmh) and striking a worker if the moving reed encounters a thread/yarn or other mechanical jam/error. One complication for weavers, in the terms of safety, is the loud nature in which weave mills operate (115dB+). Because of this, it is nearly impossible to hear a person calling for help when entangled. This has led OSHA to outline specific guidelines for companies to mitigate the chances of such accidents occurring. However, even with such guidelines in place, injuries in textile production due to the machines themselves, are still commonplace.

== See also ==
- Dobby loom
- Jacquard loom
- Paul Moody
- James Henry Northrop
- Northrop Loom
- Textile Manufacturing - the Industrial Revolution
- Cotton - Spinning, Winding, Warping and Weaving
