= Mount Temple =

Mount Temple can have the following meanings:

- Mount Temple (Alberta), a mountain in the Canadian Rockies
- The Temple (Washington), a peak of the Enchantment Peaks in the Stuart Range, Washington, United States
- Mount Temple, County Westmeath, a village in County Westmeath, Ireland
- Mount Temple Comprehensive School, a secondary school in Dublin, Ireland
- Baron Mount Temple, a title in the peerage of the United Kingdom
  - William Cowper-Temple, 1st Baron Mount Temple
  - Georgina Cowper-Temple, Baroness Mount Temple
  - Wilfrid Ashley, 1st Baron Mount Temple
  - Muriel Ashley, Baroness Mount Temple
- SS Mount Temple, a ship owned by Canadian Pacific Lines, which was near the RMS Titanic at the time of its sinking.
- Temple Mount, a religious site in the Old City of Jerusalem
- Temple Mountain (Idaho)
- Temple Mountain (New Hampshire)

== See also ==
- Temple (disambiguation)
