= Temple (disambiguation) =

A temple is a building used for religious practices and activities.

In the Abrahamic religions, The Temple usually refers to the Temple in Jerusalem, the destroyed holy site of biblical Israel.

Temple may also refer to:

== Other common meanings ==
- Temple (anatomy), a part of the head
- Temple (name), a list of people and fictional characters with the surname or given name

== Arts and entertainment ==
=== Film and television ===
- Mandir (film) (The Temple), a 1937 Indian film
- Temple (film), a 2017 horror film
- The Temple (film), a 2022 Canadian animated short film
- Temple (TV series), a Sky One television series

=== Literature ===
- Temple (novel), a 1999 novel by Matthew Reilly
- The Temple (novel), by Stephen Spender, written in 1928 and published in 1988
- "The Temple" (Lovecraft short story), by H.P. Lovecraft (1920)
- "The Temple" (Oates short story), by Joyce Carol Oates (1996)
- The Temple, the principle collection of poetry by George Herbert, published 1633

=== Music ===
- Temple Records (disambiguation), several record labels
- Temples (band), an English psychedelic rock band from Kettering
- Temple (album), a 2020 album by Thao & the Get Down Stay Down
- "Temple" (Kings of Leon song)
- "Temple", a song by Tonight Alive from their album Underworld
- "The Temple", a song from the 1971 rock opera Jesus Christ Superstar by Andrew Lloyd Webber and Tim Rice
- Temple, a soloist project of guitarist Walter Giardino

=== Other arts and entertainment ===
- The Temple (painting), a 1949 painting by Paul Delvaux
- Name for dungeons found in The Legend of Zelda franchise

== Places ==
=== Canada ===
- Temple, Calgary, a neighbourhood in Calgary, Alberta
- Mount Temple (Alberta), a mountain

=== France ===
- Temple station (Paris Metro), a Paris Metro station
- Square du Temple, a garden and former location of a fortress in Paris

=== United Kingdom ===
- Temple, Cornwall, a village
- Temple, County Down, Northern Ireland, a village
- Temple, Glasgow, Scotland, a neighbourhood
- The Temple, Liverpool, an office building
- Temple, London, an area in the vicinity of Temple Church
  - Temple tube station
- Temple, Midlothian, a village

=== United States ===
- Temple, Georgia
- Temple, Indiana
- Temple, Maine
- Temple, Michigan
- Temple, New Hampshire
- Temple, North Dakota
- Temple, Oklahoma
- Temple, Pennsylvania
- Temple, Texas
- The Temple (Atlanta)
- The Temple (Old Orchard Beach, Maine)
- The Temple (Cleveland, Ohio)
- Temple Mountain (Idaho)
- Temple Mountain (New Hampshire)
- Temple (nightclub), a nightclub in San Francisco and Denver
- The Temple (Washington), a mountain in Washington state

== Schools in the United States ==
- Temple University, Pennsylvania
- Temple College, Texas
- Temple High School (disambiguation)

== Other uses ==
- Temple (weaving), a part of a weaving machine for spreading the cloth
- Side-pieces on a set of glasses
- Temple, a variety of tangor, a cross between an orange and a tangerine
- Temple Owls, the athletic program of Temple University
- Temple shipbuilders, Tyneside, late 18th and early 19th century
- Temple Hotels, a Canadian company that owns and manages Canadian hotels
- Rangers Ballpark in Arlington, Texas, nicknamed "The Temple"
- TempleOS, a computer operating system

== See also ==
- Temple Mount, Jerusalem, a hill
- Temple City, California
- Tempel (disambiguation)
- Stephan Templ, Austrian author and journalist
- Timple, a Canary Islands stringed instrument
