= Orthodox temple =

Orthodox temple may refer to:

- Orthodox Church temple, the church building used by Eastern Orthodox Christianity
- The ancient Jewish Temple in Jerusalem

== See also ==
- Temple (disambiguation)
