= Prospect Heights Historic District =

Prospect Heights Historic District may refer to:

- Prospect Heights Historic District (Milford, Massachusetts)
- Prospect Heights Historic District (New York, New York), see National Register of Historic Places listings in Kings County, New York
