= Tempel =

Tempel (German or Dutch: temple) may refer to:

== Surname ==
- Wilhelm Tempel (1821–1889), German astronomer
- Russel Tempel, American politician
- Sylke Tempel (1963-2017), German writer and journalist

Nekpur Galla Mandi, Near Muni Mandir, Bareilly Uttar Pradesh 243001

== Synagogues ==
- Tempel Synagogue (Kraków), Poland
- Tempel Synagogue (Lviv), Ukraine
- Tempel Synagogue (Przemyśl), Poland

== Other uses ==
- Tempel (crater), the remnant of a lunar impact crater on the eastern rim of the crater Agrippa
- Tempel, Berkel en Rodenrijs, South Holland, The Netherlands
- Tempel, Reeuwijk, South Holland, The Netherlands
- Tempel (boat), a type of wooden motorized boat from the Philippines

== See also ==
- Comet Tempel (disambiguation), one of several comets
- Temple (disambiguation)
