= British Northrop Loom Co Ltd =

British Northrop Loom Co Ltd was an engineering firm based in Blackburn, Lancashire, England. The company manufactured machinery for producing textiles, particularly the Northrop Loom.

It expanded rapidly around the time of the First World War, and by the 1950s it exported over 10,000 machines annually worldwide.

With the exception of electric motors, the majority of loom parts were manufactured in the Blackburn factory which had a foundry, machine shop, a smithy for forging and welding, wood working shop for slays, bobbins and shuttles and an assembly line with the enterprise occupying a total area of 1,050,000 sq ft by 1956. Production declined in the face of competition from new technologies such as shuttleless looms from continental Europe and Japan.
