= Globe Works, Accrington =

The Globe Centre
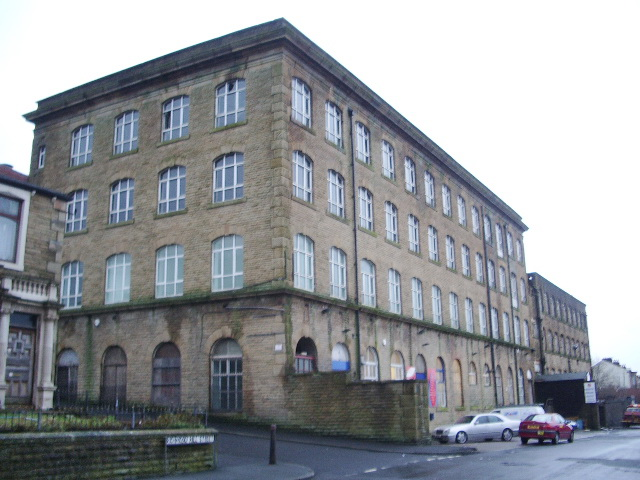

- Location within the Borough of Hyndburn
- Former names: Globe Works

General information
- Type: Factory
- Location: Accrington, Lancashire, England
- Coordinates: 53.75061°N 2.37043°W
- Opened: 1853

Technical details
- Floor area: 52 acres (21 ha)

The Globe Works is a former industrial works in Accrington, Lancashire, England, that following refurbishment contains rented offices and conference rooms and is known as the Globe Centre. The centre is made up of the remainder of The Globe Works, which created machinery and looms for the cotton industry under management of the Howard & Bullough firm.

== The Globe Works 1853–1993 ==
The Globe Works was formed in 1853 by two men from Bury, Mr Howard and Mr Bleakley. The works manufactured machinery and parts for supply to Lancashire’s textile industry and across the world. The staff initially consisted of four workers.

In 1856, co-founder Mr. Bleakly retired and was replaced by inventor James Bullough, who was responsible for the creation of the Lancashire Loom alongside William Kenworthy. The Globe Works employed 150 people at this time. Under Bullough's guidance, The Globe Works concentrated its manufacturing efforts on the production of looms. The number of staff at the Globe Works had doubled by 1864.

Following his father’s death in 1866, John Bullough took over The Globe Works at age 29.

John's son George took over the Globe Works when his father died in 1891. George initially joined the works as an apprentice, then saw his annual income rise to over £300,000.

In 1920 the Globe Works was the world’s largest producer of ring spinning frames. During the 1920s Howard and Bullough employed over 6,000 people from Accrington and the surrounding areas. The Globe Works was 52 acres in size.

During World War II, production was dedicated to weapon components for the war effort. George died in 1939.

The Howard and Bullough business was bought by Platt International in 1970, who continued to operate in the Globe Works. The Globe Works closed its doors for business in 1993.

== The Globe Centre 2006–present ==
Today the sole remaining building from the Globe Works has been renamed The Globe Centre. The office accommodation centre includes tenants such as Regenerate Pennine Lancashire, the Lancashire County Council and BT partnership One Connect

The site gives employment to around 1,000 people and training to over 125 young people each year.
