= Whitin Machine Works =

Textile machinery company in Massachusetts

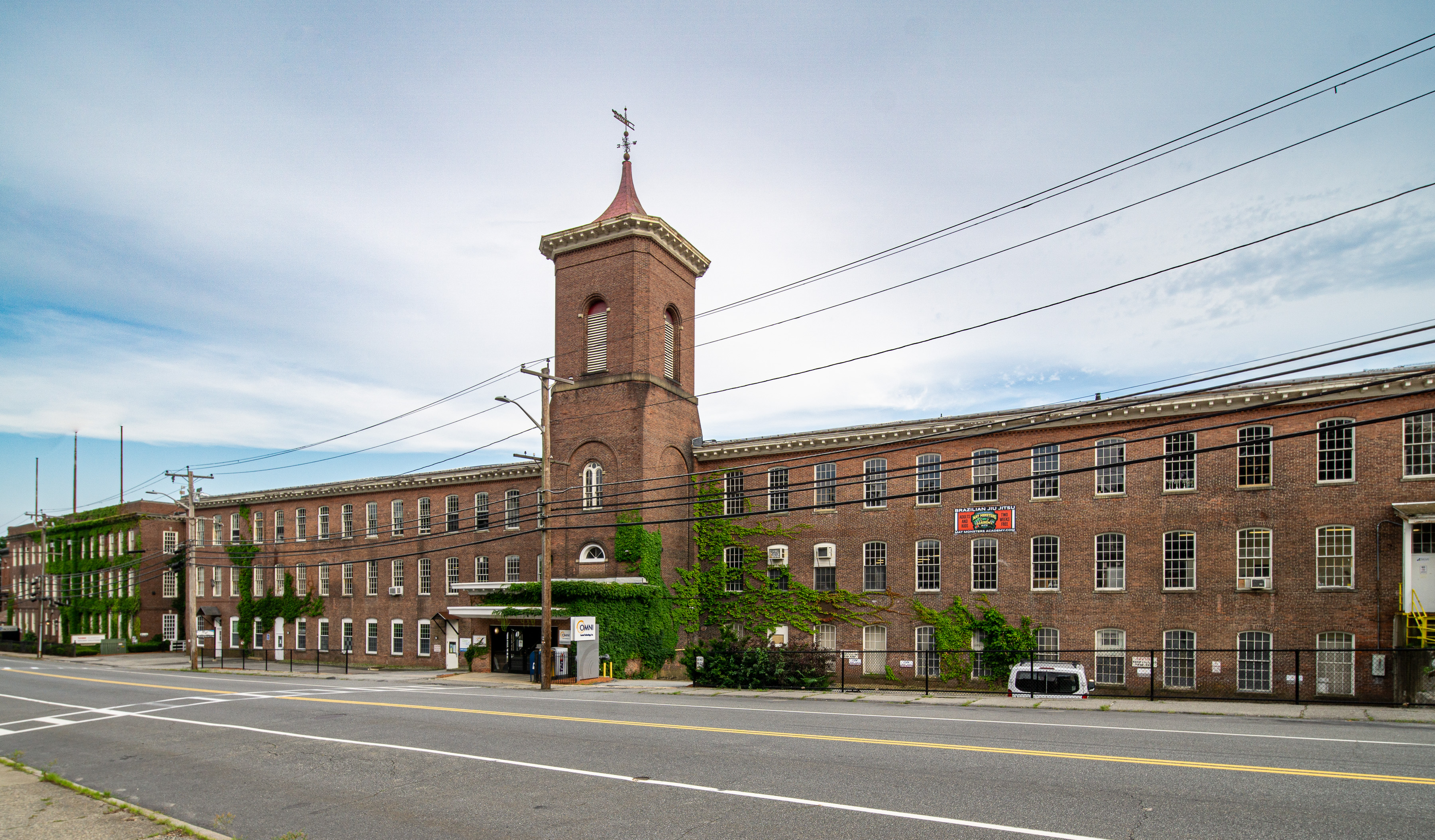
Whitin Machine Works

Whitin Machine Works (WMW) was founded by Paul Whitin and his sons in 1831 beside the Mumford River in Northbridge, Massachusetts.

Whitin Machine Works operated into the 20th century, even as many New England mills relocated to the southern United States during the same period. By 1948, Whitin Machine Works employed more than 5,600 people. Until its closure in 1976, the company was a principal employer in Whitinsville, Massachusetts, which residents colloquially referred to as "The Shop".

== Origins ==
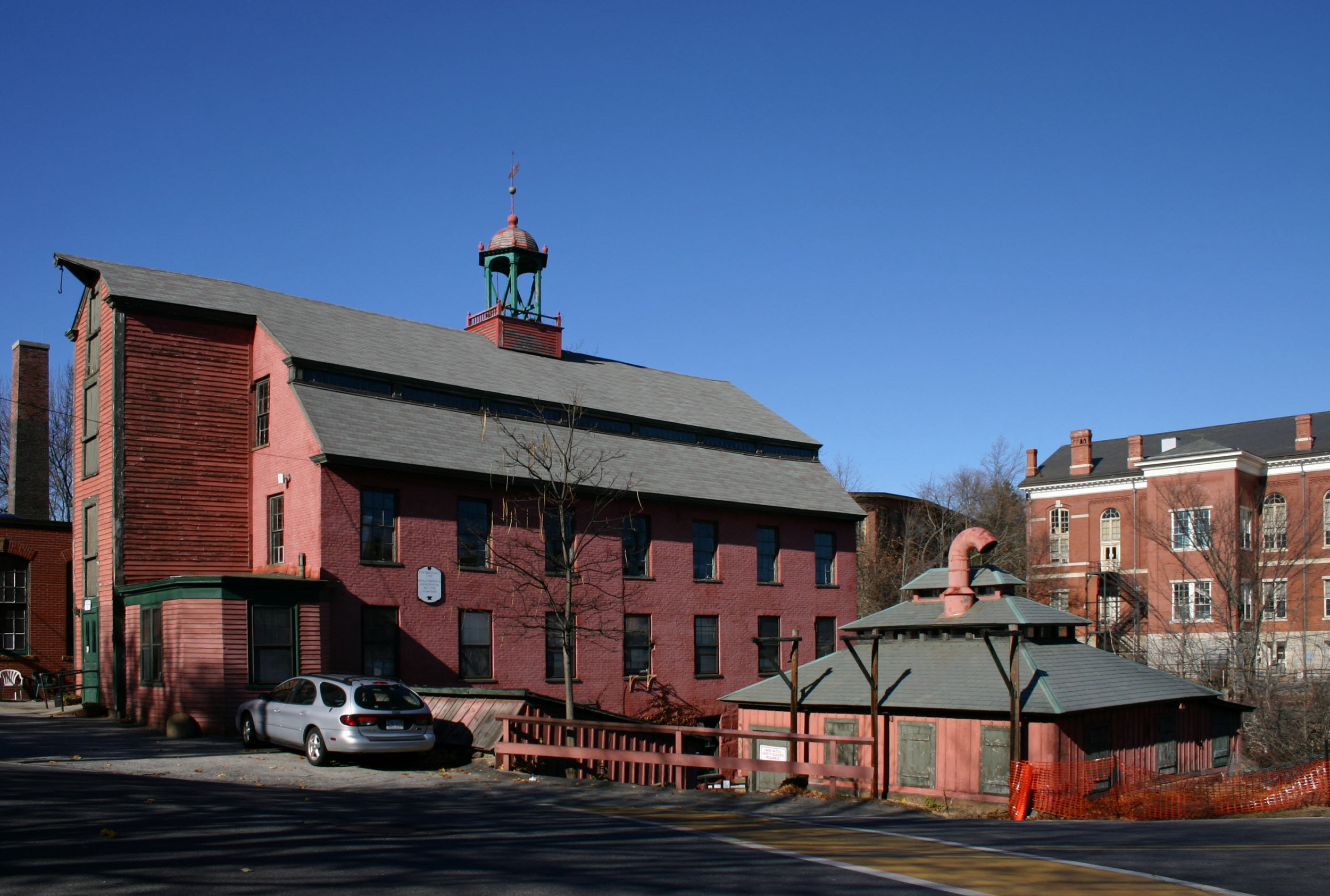
1826 Brick Mill and Fletcher's Forge, Whitinsville, Massachusetts

In 1809, Paul Whitin, his father-in-law James Fletcher, and others from Northbridge and Leicester established the Northbridge Cotton Manufacturing Company. It was the third cotton mill in the Blackstone Valley at the time.

In 1815, under the firm name of 'Whitin & Fletcher', Paul Whitin became a partner with Fletcher and his two brothers-in-law, Samuel and Ezra Fletcher. A second mill with 300 spindles was built on the opposing bank of the Mumford River. Following the purchase of the Fletcher interests in 1826, Paul Whitin established a new company with Paul Jr. and John Crane Whitin, named Paul Whitin and Sons. That year, a new brick mill was constructed with 2,000 spindles. The structure still stands in Whitinsville.

Following Paul Whitin's death in 1831, the cotton business continued to expand. In 1845, Betsey Whitin and her sons built a new stone textile factory, largely of granite, known as the Whitinsville Cotton Mill, which added 7,500 spindles to the family business. The Whitinsville Cotton Mill would later be used as a testing facility for new equipment developed by the Whitin Machine Works across the street.

== Whitinsville ==
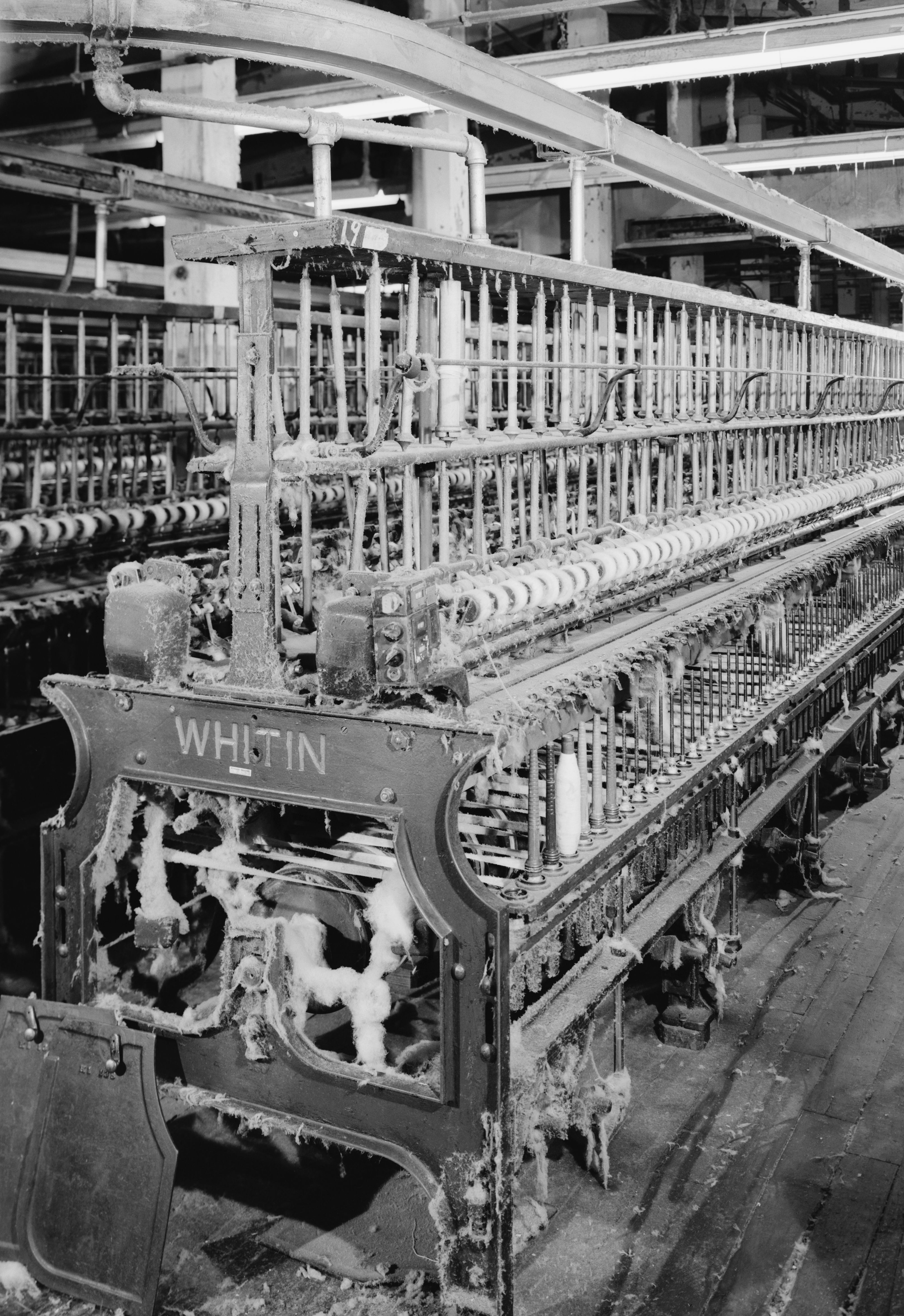
A Whitin Spinning Frame

In 1831, Paul Whitin's third son, John Crane Whitin, designed and patented a new cotton picker machine that outperformed those used in previous mills. This was the first in the series of inventions that would establish the Whitin Machine Works as a major textile machinery company.

In 1847, the Whitins built "The Shop," which consisted of a new textile production area, four times larger than the brick mill. It contained machine shops, foundries, and other specialized structures.

Throughout the Whitin family's ownership of the Machine Works, they established many public buildings. Some of these buildings, including the community center and Memorial Square, are still in use by the community.

The Whitin family continued to hold Whitin Machine Works privately until 1946. By 1948, the company was operating at a capacity of over 5,600 employees.

== Legacy and current use ==
The Whitin Machine Works facility was converted into an industrial complex. As of 2008, it employs approximately 2,500 people.

== See also ==
- Paul Whitin
- Sarah Elizabeth Whitin
- Draper Corporation
- Saco-Lowell Shops
- Platt Brothers

== Archives and records ==
- Whitin Machine Works records at Baker Library Special Collections, Harvard Business School.
- Whitin Machine Works additional records at Baker Library Special Collections, Harvard Business School.
