= Prospect Heights Historic District (Milford, Massachusetts) =

Historic district in Massachusetts, United States

- U.S. National Register of Historic Places
- U.S. Historic district
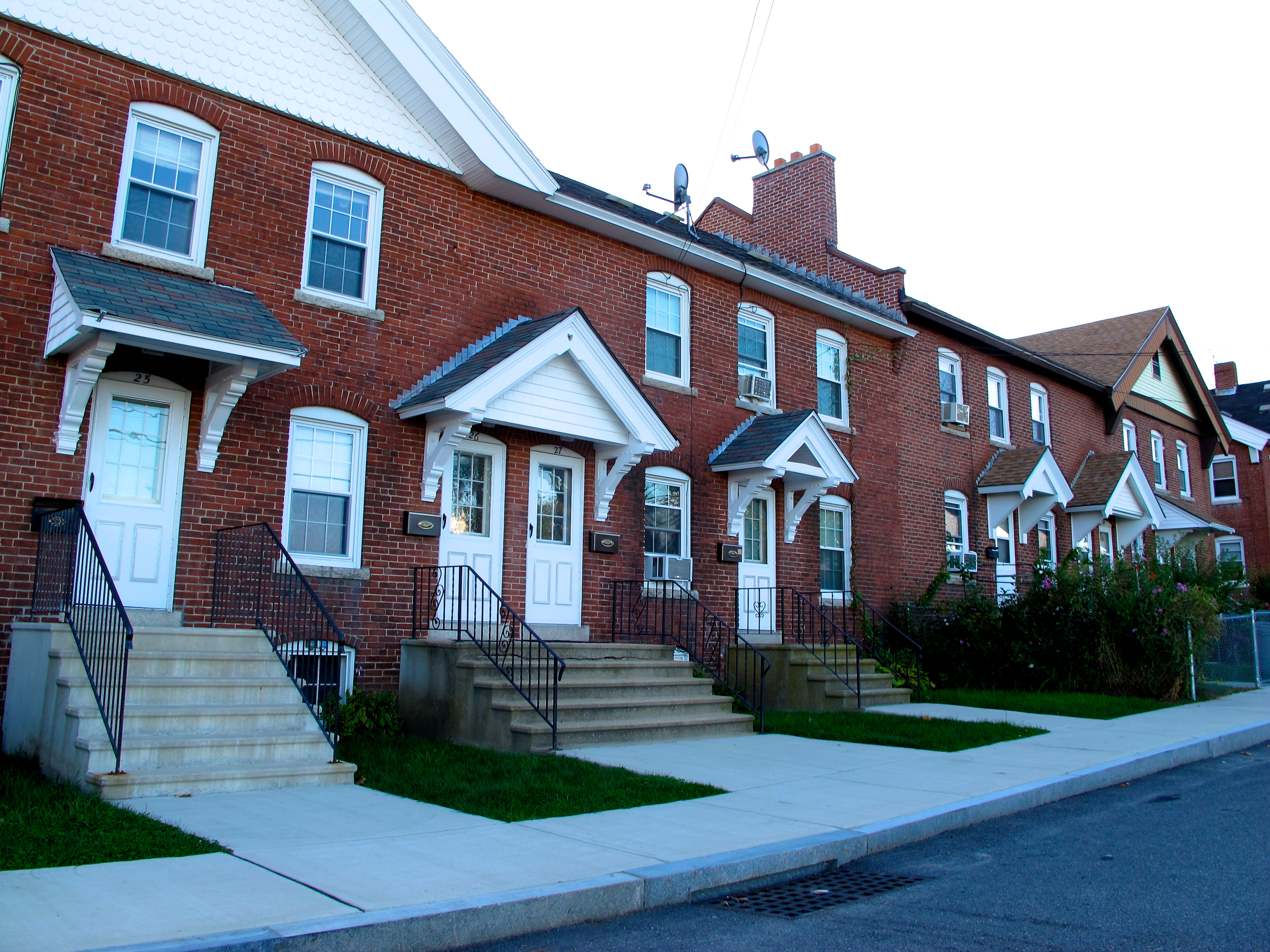

- Location within Massachusetts Location within the United States
- Location: Milford, Massachusetts
- Coordinates: 42°8′10″N 71°31′55″W
- Built: 1903
- Architect: Multiple
- Architectural style: Late 19th And Early 20th Century American Movements, Late 19th And 20th Century Revivals, Late Victorian
- NRHP reference No.: 90001344
- Added to NRHP: September 5, 1990

Prospect Heights Historic District is a historic district roughly bounded by Prospect Heights, Prospect, and Water Streets in Milford, Massachusetts. It encompasses a neighborhood that was created by the Draper Corporation of Hopedale, Massachusetts for its immigrant workers. The district was listed on the National Register of Historic Places in 1990.

The community has a mix of different nationalities. Every year a new mayor is chosen to represent the community. There has been a mayor for every year starting in 1962, with a different background being represented each year: Portuguese, Irish, Italian, Greek, Armenian or Polish.

The Heights contains a World War II Memorial honoring local veterans who served in the war. The monument contains 184 names including one female, a nurse.

There is also the Portuguese Club, a soccer field, basketball courts, and a playground for children.

Every year the annual Portuguese Picnic is held drawing thousands every year. The new mayor also starts on the same day.

The motto of the heights is "No matter where you roam, Prospect Heights is still your home."

LIST OF MAYORS:
1961-1962 - Oracio Moreira - Portuguese †
1962-1963 - John Milan - Irish †
1963-1964 - Ardashes Krikorian - Armenian †
1964-1965 - Fred Crescenzi - Italian †
1965-1966 - John Chappel - Polish †
1966-1967 - George Alves - Portuguese †
1967-1968 - Jim Donlan - Irish †
1968-1969 - Hagop Papelian - Armenian †
1969-1970 - Joe Recchia - Italian †
1970-1971 - Thomas Tominsky - Polish †
1971-1972 - Joseph Lopes - Portuguese †
1972-1973 - Joseph McAuliffe - Irish †
1973-1974 - Joseph Derderian - Armenian †
1974-1975 - Dominik D'Amico - Italian †
1975-1976 - Joseph Oneschuk - Polish †
1976-1977 - Domenic Dias - Portuguese †
1977-1978 - John Coniaris - Greek †
1978-1979 - George Marashian - Armenian †
1979-1980 - Dante Viallani - Italian †
1980-1981 - Theodore Kosciak - Polish †
1981-1982 - Fernando Rodrigues - Portuguese †
1982-1983 - Joseph Evans - Irish †
1983-1984 - Carlos doCurral - Portuguese †
1984-1985 - John Villani - Italian †
1985-1986 - Nicholas Coniaris - Greek †
1986-1987 - Diego Chaves - Portuguese
1987-1988 - Alfred Andreola Jr. - Greek
1988-1989 - Daniel Ruggerio - Italian †
1989-1990 - Bento G. doCurral Jr. - Portuguese
1990-1991 - Edward Bertorelli - Irish
1991-1992 - Manoog Manoogian - Armenian
1992-1993 - Agostina Lancia - Italian †
1993-1994 - Domingoes Pereira - Portuguese
1994-1995 - John Wylie - Irish
1995-1996 - Jeffrey Varteresian - Armenian
1996-1997 - R. Allen Alves - Italian
1997-1998 - David Soares - Portuguese
1998-1999 - Albert Azevedo - Irish
1999-2000 - Walter Costa - Armenian
2000-2001 - Michael Tebeau - Italian
2001-2002 - John Perry - Polish
2002-2003 - John Fernandes - Portuguese
2003-2004 - Gary Matos - Irish
2004-2005 - John Derderian - Armenian
2005-2006 - David A. Consigli - Italian
2006-2007 - Joseph Batista - Portuguese †
2007-2008 - Thomas Cullen - Irish
2008-2009 - Anthony C. Gonsalves - Italian
2009-2010 - Alberto A. Correia - Portuguese
2011-2012 - Paul Sharp - Irish
2012-2013 - Steven Gulino - Italian
2013-2014 - Manny Borges - Portuguese
2014 -2015 - Will Kinkade - Irish
2015-2016 - Paul Mazzuchelli - Italian
2016-2017 - Ed Ross - Polish
2017-2018 - Domingos Roda - Portuguese
2018-2019 - John Laronga - Armenian
2019-2020 - Jamie Luchini - Italian
2021-2022 - Paul Braza - Portuguese
2022-2023 - Christopher DiGellonardo - Irish
2023-2024 - Edward Varteresian - Armenian
2024-2025 - Dennis Maietta - Italian

LIST OF HONORARY MAYORS:
Scott Anderson
David Azevedo
Jose Batista
Manuel Chaves
Mike Consoletti
Antonio Coelho
Jose Coelho
Manuel Esteves
Manuel Gonsalves
Louis Hellmuth
Anthony Imbruno
Anthony Matheus
Manuel Matheus
Aurelio Matos
Frank Matos
Maurice Panagian
Rico Pisaro
John Silva
Sidney Smith
Joseph Soares
Dominic Alfonso

== See also ==
- National Register of Historic Places listings in Worcester County, Massachusetts
