= Northrop Loom =

Automatic power loom developed in 1895

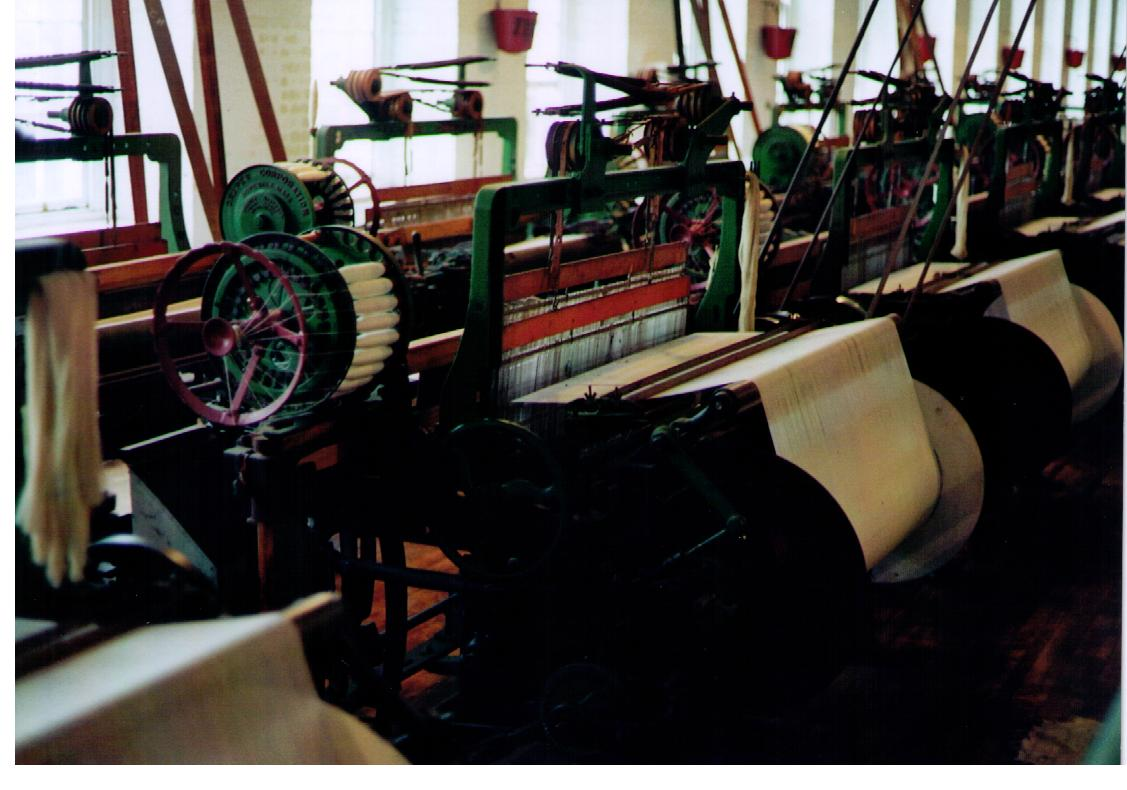
A Draper loom in textile museum, Lowell, Massachusetts

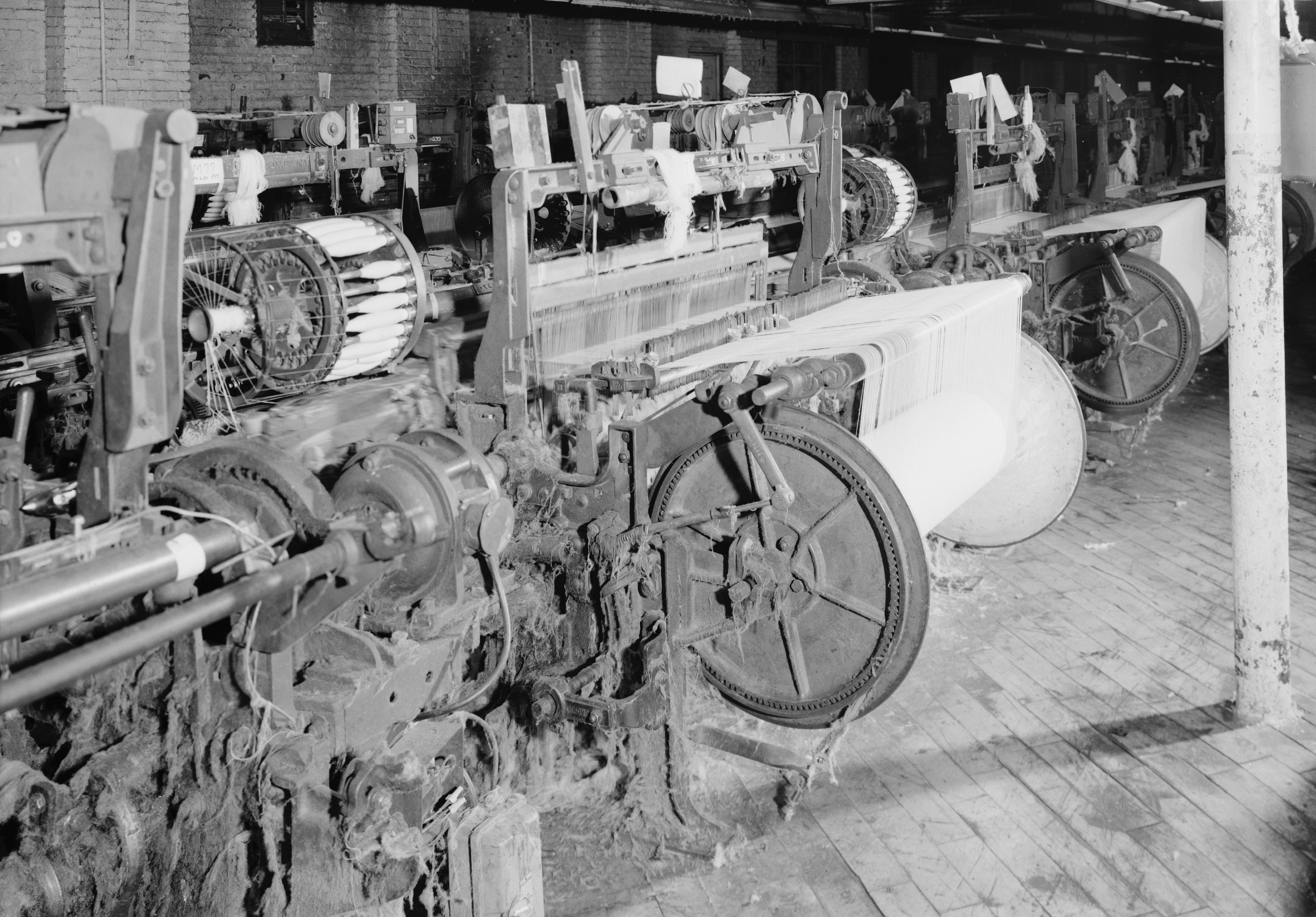
A Draper loom showing a Northrop filling-changing battery (the cylinder of pirns) in Bamberg, South Carolina

The Northrop Loom was a fully automatic power loom marketed by George Draper and Sons, Hopedale, Massachusetts beginning in 1895. It was named after James Henry Northrop who invented the shuttle-charging mechanism.

== Background ==
James Henry Northrop, (8 May 1856 - 12 December 1940) was born in Keighley, West Yorkshire in the United Kingdom, where he worked in the textile industry. He emigrated to Boston, Massachusetts in 1881. Northrop worked as a mechanic and foreman, for George Draper and Sons. There he invented a spooler guide. He left and tried to be a chicken farmer, but was unsuccessful. It was at that time that he invented a shuttle-charger. Otis Draper saw a model of the device on March 5, 1889. Draper was also developing the Rhoades shuttle-charger. Northrop was given a loom to test his idea.

By May 20 he concluded that his first idea was not practical, and thought of another idea. On July 5, the completed loom was running, and as it seemed to have more advantages than the Rhoades loom. The Northrop device was given a mill trial in October 1889 at the Seaconnett Mills in Fall River, Massachusetts. More looms were constructed and tested at Seaconnett later in 1889 and during 1890.

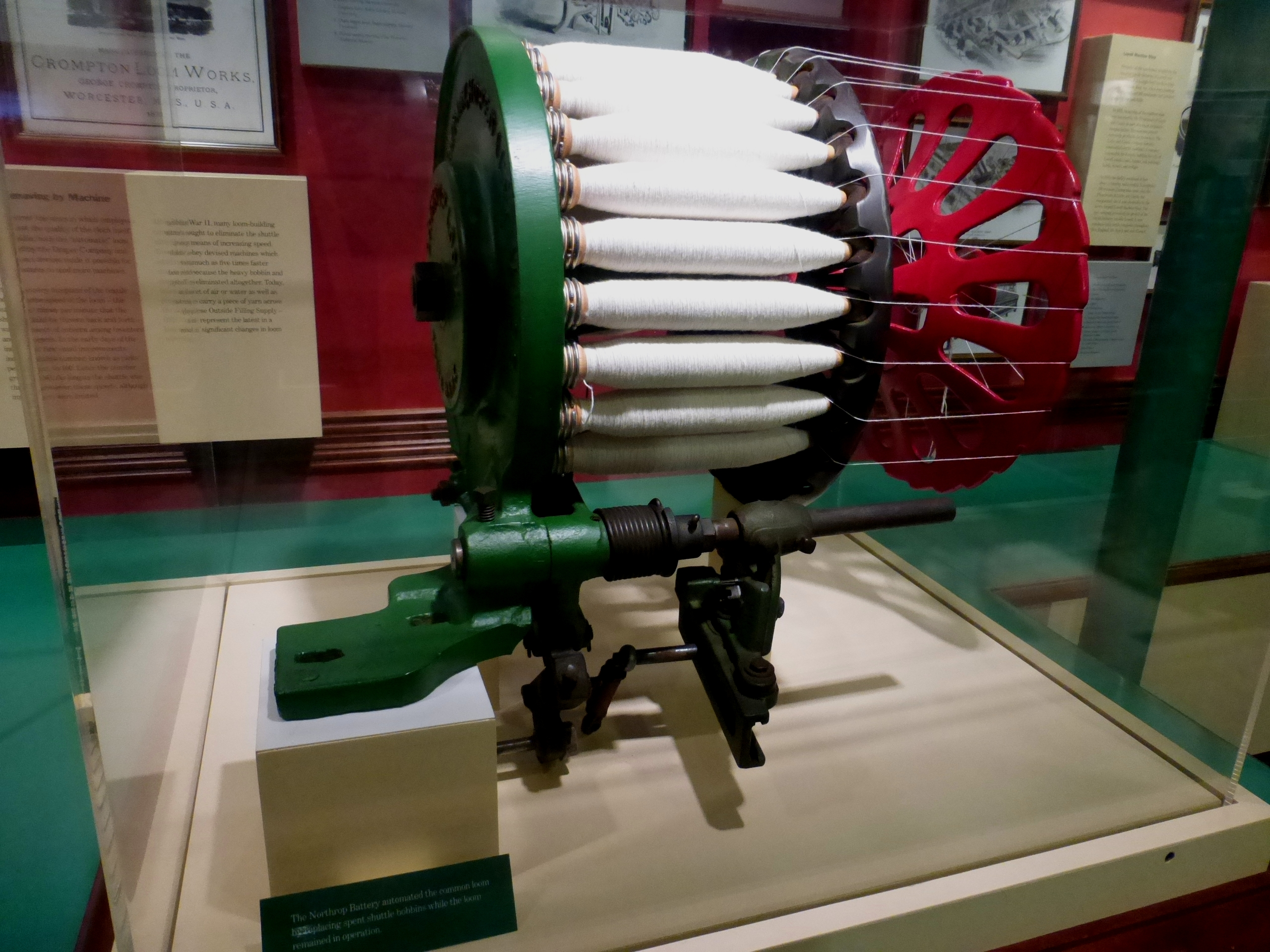
Northrop Battery

Meanwhile, Northrop invented a self-threading shuttle and shuttle spring jaws to hold a bobbin by means of rings on the butt. This paved the way to his filling-changing battery of 1891, the basic feature of the Northrop loom. Northrop was responsible for several hundred weaving related patents. Other members of the Draper organization had developed a workable warp stop motion which was also included. The first Northrop looms were marketed in 1894. Northrop retired to California two years later when he was 42.

== Economics ==
The principal advantage of the Northrop loom was that it was fully automatic; when a warp thread broke, the loom stopped until it was fixed. When the shuttle ran out of thread, Northrop's mechanism ejected the depleted pirn and loaded a new full one without stopping. A loom operative could work 16 or more looms whereas previously they could only operate eight. Thus, the labour cost was halved. Mill owners had to decide whether the labour saving was worth the capital investment in a new loom. By 1900, Draper had sold over 60,000 Northrop looms and were shipping 1,500 a month, were employing 2,500 men and enlarging their Hopedale works to increase that output. In all 700,000 looms were sold.

By 1914, Northrop looms made up 40% of American looms. However, in the United Kingdom labour costs were not as significant and Northrop had only 2% of the British market. Northrops were especially suitable for coarse cottons, but it was said not particularly suitable for fines, thus the financial advantage in their introduction into Lancashire was not as great as it had been in the United States. Henry Philip Greg imported some of the first Northrops into Britain in 1902, for his Albert Mill in Reddish, and encouraged his brother Robert Alexander Greg to introduce Northrops into Quarry Bank Mill in 1909. Greg bought 94 looms and output increased from 2.31 lbs/man-hr in 1900, to 2.94 lbs/man-hr in 1914. Labour costs decreased from 0.9d per pound to 0.3d per pound.

Draper's strategy was to standardise on a couple of models which they mass-produced. The lighter E-model of 1909 was joined in the 1930 by the heavier X-model. Continuous fibre machines, say for rayon, which was more break-prone, needed a specialist loom. This was provided by the purchase of the Stafford Loom Co. in 1932, and using their patents a third loom the XD, was added to the range. Because of their mass production techniques they were reluctant and slow to retool for new technologies such as shuttleless looms.

== British Northrop models ==
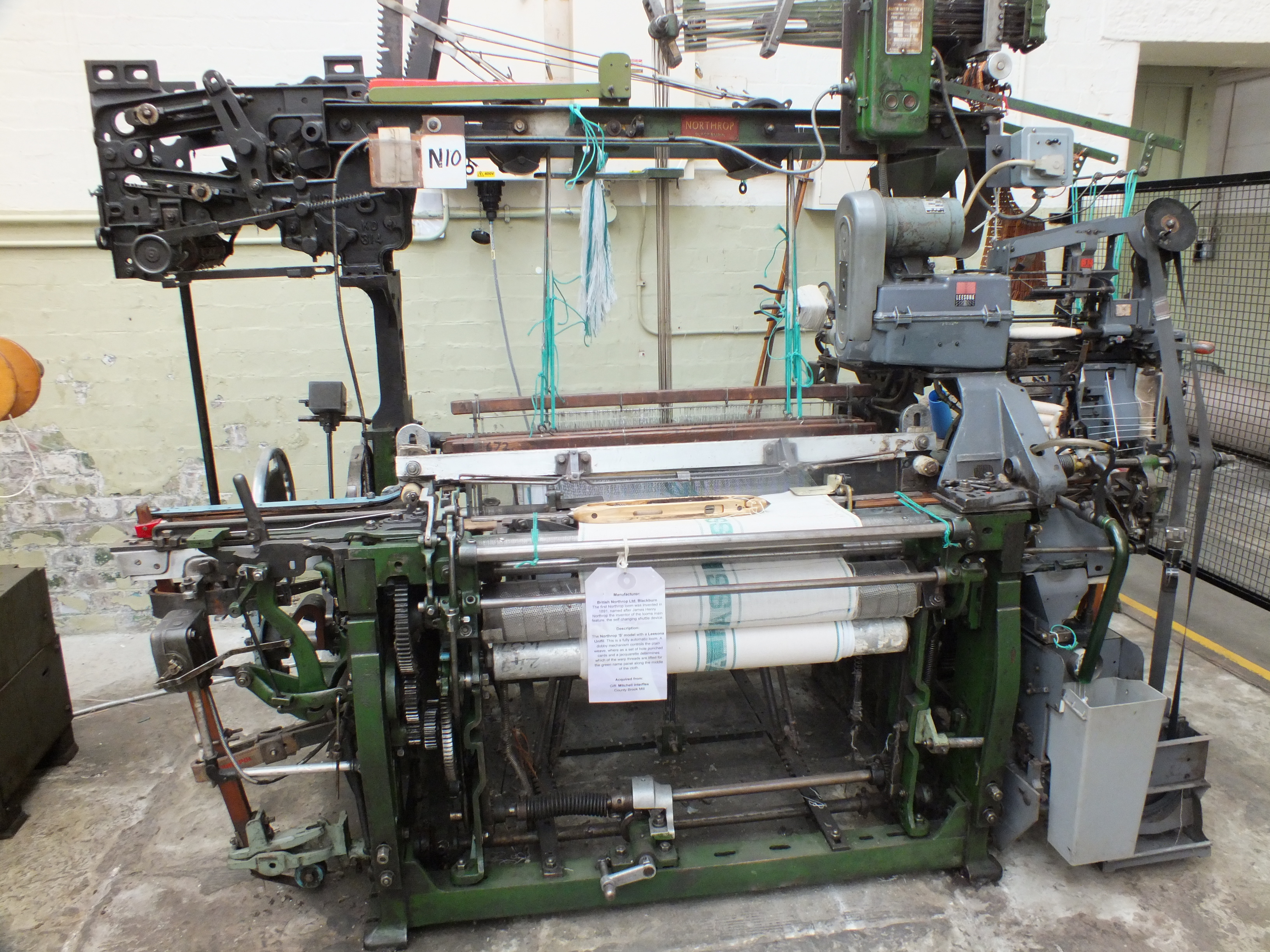
British Northrop S Model loom

Large numbers of Northrop type looms were manufactured by the British Northrop Loom Company at its factory in Blackburn, Lancashire.

- F Model: 30" to 120" for weaving cotton sheeting, woollens, worsteds, blankets
- D Model: 30" to 70" for dress goods, dobby medium weight cloths, rain coatings
- T Model: 28" to 60" the standard loom for calico, twills, coloured shirtings, brocades
