= James Henry Northrop =

British-American weaver

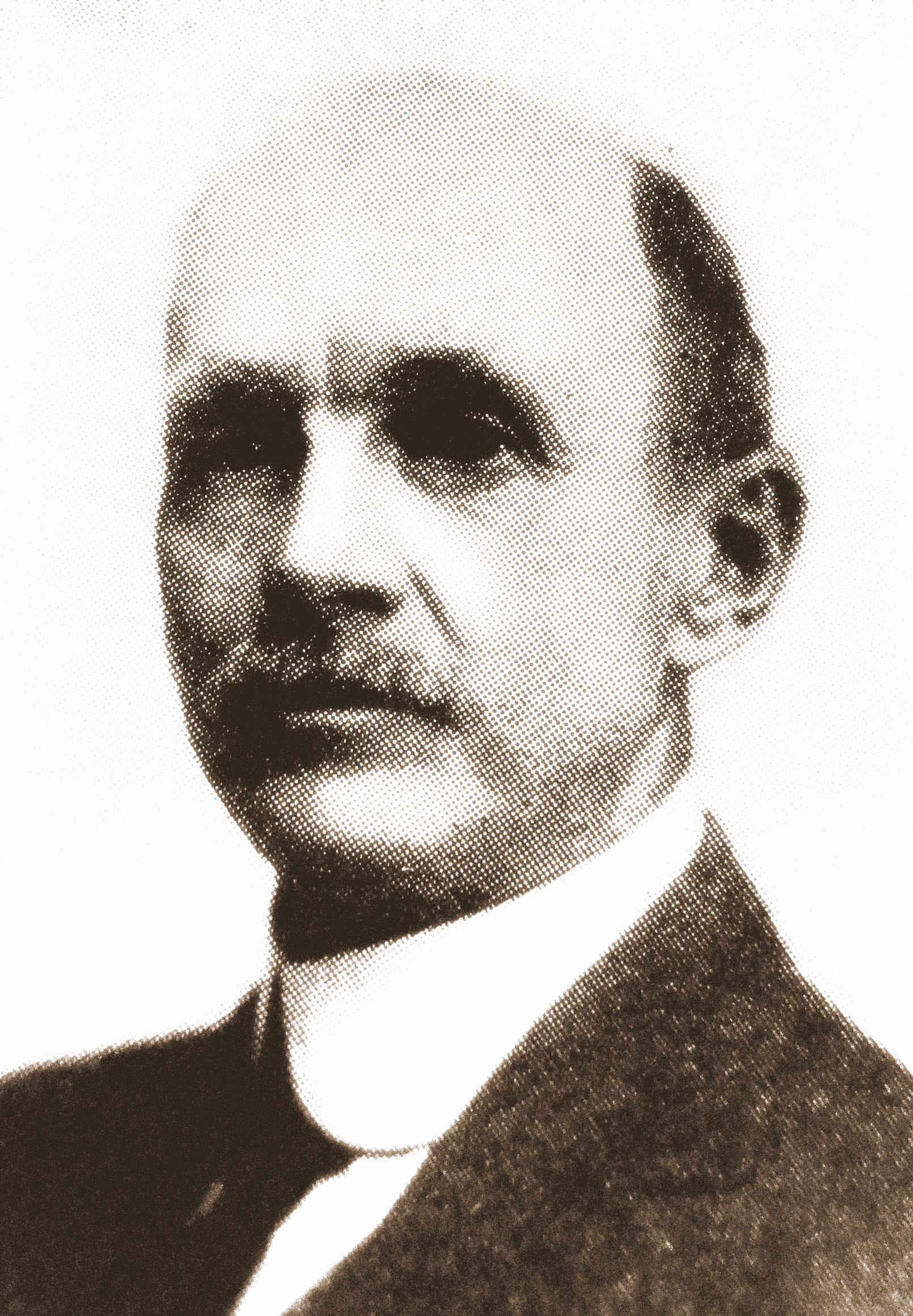
- Born: May 8, 1856; Keighley, West Yorkshire
- Died: December 12, 1940 (aged 84); Santa Ana, California, US
- Occupation: inventor
- Known for: Northrop Automatic Loom

James Henry Northrop (8 May 1856 – 12 December 1940) was born in Keighley, West Yorkshire in the United Kingdom, where he worked in the textile industry. He emigrated to Boston, Massachusetts, in 1881. By 1898, working in Hopedale, Massachusetts for George Draper and Sons, Northrop had filed several hundred patents some of which were used in the Northrop Loom. He retired at 42. He died in Santa Ana, California on 12 December 1940, at 84.

== Working life ==
When the Industrial Revolution was soaring, inventors from all over the world were making a difference by creating a variety of mechanical innovations to vastly improve both the speed goods could be manufactured, hugely reducing labor costs as automation began to take over. While virtually every country went through industrial development during the 1700s and 1800s, those in Europe saw the revolution occur years ahead of every other continent. For the most part, inventors who created automated and semi-automated looms came from Europe, notably the United Kingdom and France. These were the leaders in many of the innovations that were developed, often leaving the rest of the world behind, including the United States. Failing to develop their inventions to further along the development within the textile industry, the United States found themselves having to purchase looms and other devices from Europe. However, this changed in 1895 when James Henry Northrop created a shuttle charging mechanism, which later became known as the Northrop Loom.

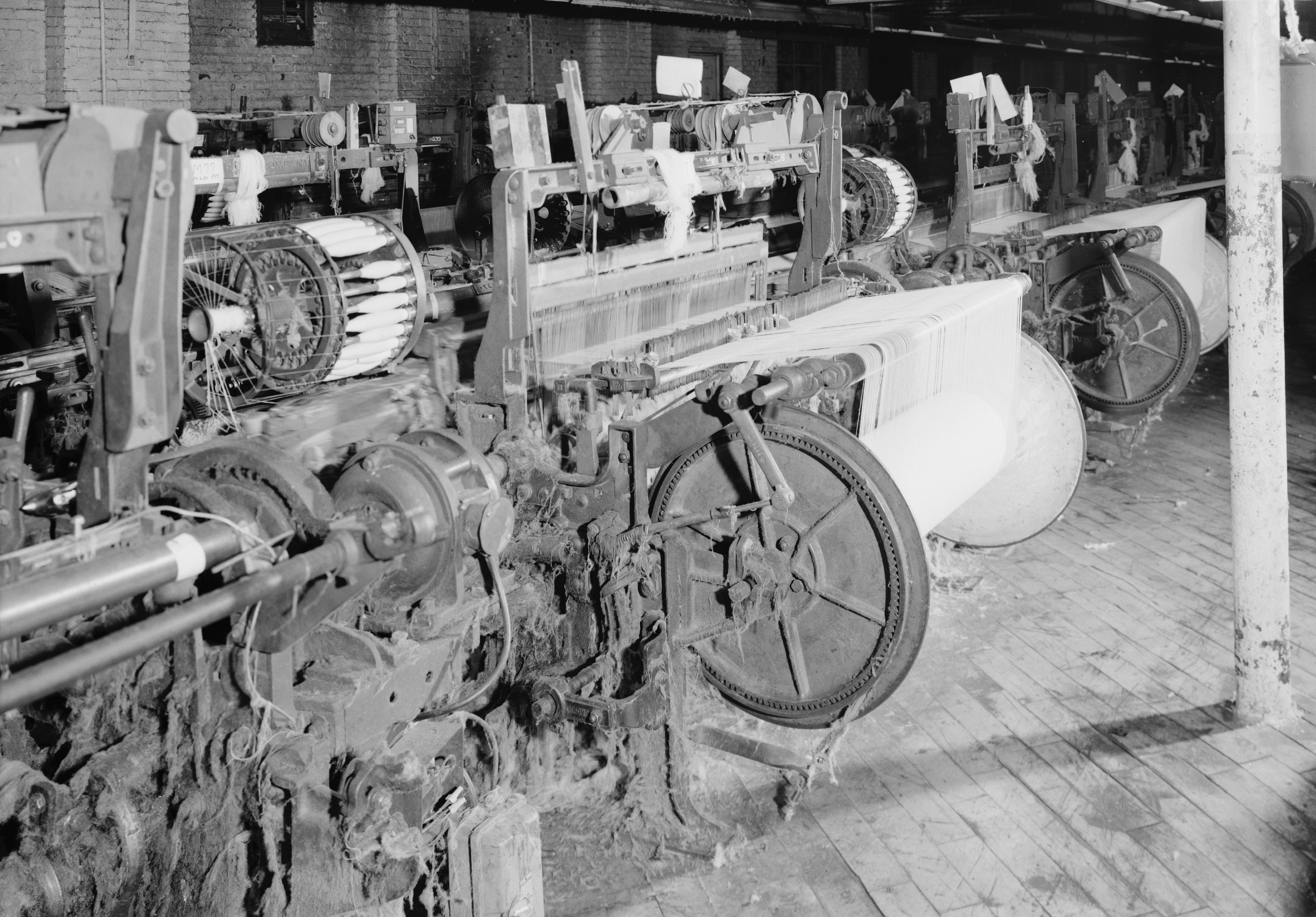
A Draper loom showing a Northrop filling-changing battery (the cylinder of pirns) in Bamberg, South Carolina

He started his working life in England, where he was a mechanic and factory foreman before emigrating to Massachusetts in 1881.

He moved to Hopedale, Massachusetts to work for George Draper and Sons. Here he invented the Northrop spooler guide. He unsuccessfully tried to be a chicken farmer. And it was there he worked on his shuttle-charger for Mr Otis Draper, who saw a model of the device on March 5, 1889. Draper was also developing the Rhoades shuttle-charger. Northrop was given a loom to test his idea. By May 20 he had concluded that his first idea was not practical, and had thought of another idea, On July 5, the completed loom was running, and as it seemed to have more advantages than the Rhoades loom. The Northrop device was given a mill trial in October 1889 at the Seaconnett Mills in Fall River. More looms were constructed.

A short time later he created a self-threading shuttle and added shuttle spring jaws which would hold the bobbin in place utilizing specially designed rings on the butt. His work with these other inventions lead to the development of The Northrop Loom, a notable invention within the weaving industry. This paved the way to his filling-changing battery of 1891, the basic feature of the Northrop Loom. The design made it so that one loom could contain several hundred different design patterns that enabled it to quickly move from one kind of design to another with a minimal loss of productivity. Using his two shuttle features as well as a workable warp stop created by his partners at the Draper organization, his new battery made it so that the punch cards and shuttle mechanisms that were used to develop patterns could be interchanged in a matter of minutes.

The development of a workable warp stop motion by other members of the Draper organization and marketing of the first Northrop looms in 1894 resulted in a notable increase in productivity in the American textile industry. By 1900, Draper had sold over 60,000 Northrop looms, They were shipping 1500 a month, were employing 2500 men and enlarging their works to increase that output.

== Personal life ==
He married Emily Driver of Keighley, Yorkshire and had 5 daughters. The Northrop loom sold well, so he was able to retire at the age of 42. He bought a fruit farm in Indio, California where he grew dates and spent his time fishing.
