= Draper Corporation =

Former US loom manufacturer

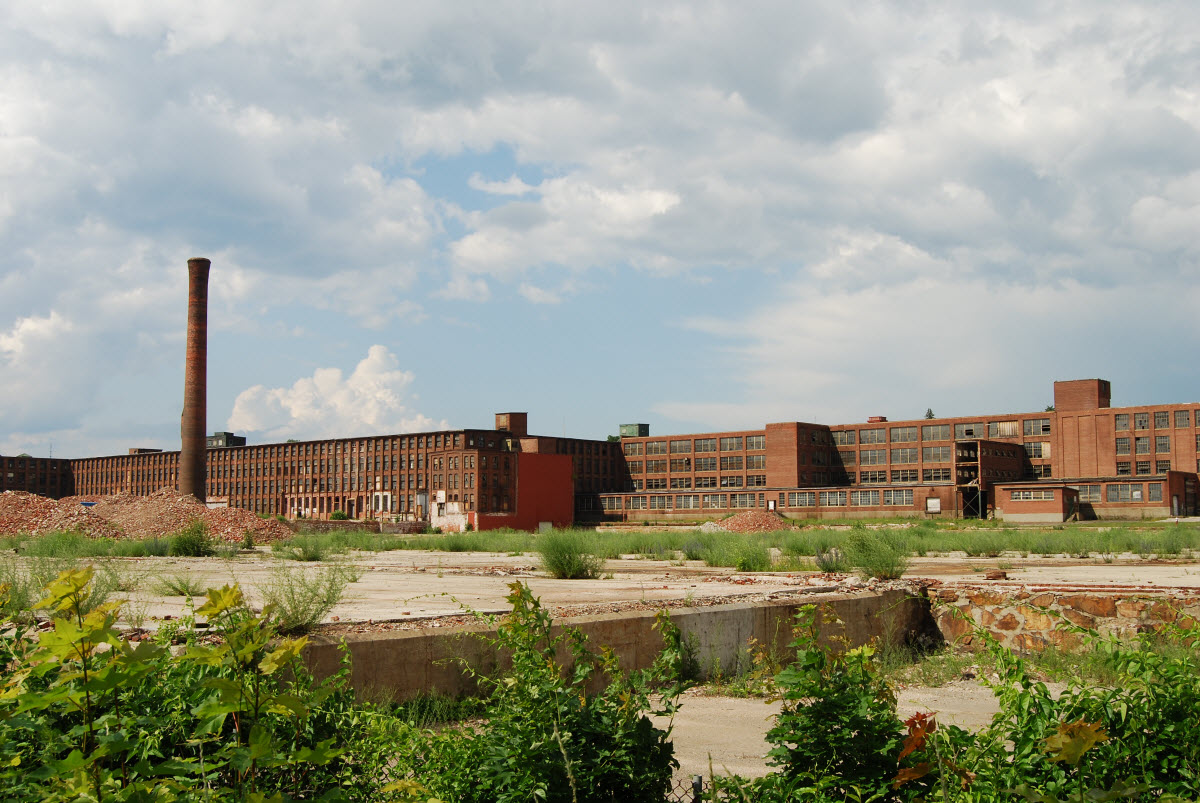
- Former factories of the Draper Corporation in Hopedale, Massachusetts
- Type: Private
- Industry: Power looms

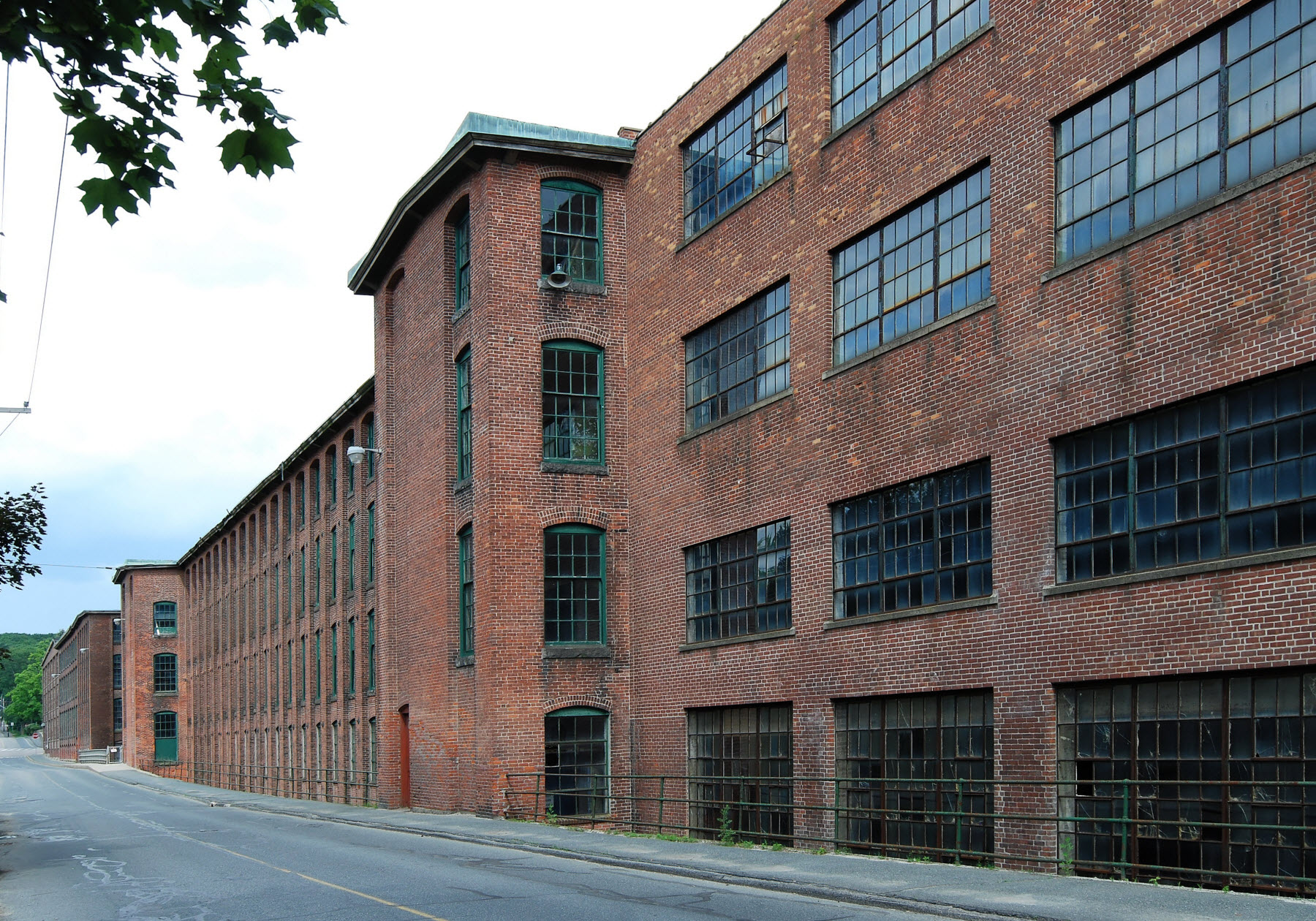
Abandoned Draper Factory in 2009, Hopedale, Massachusetts

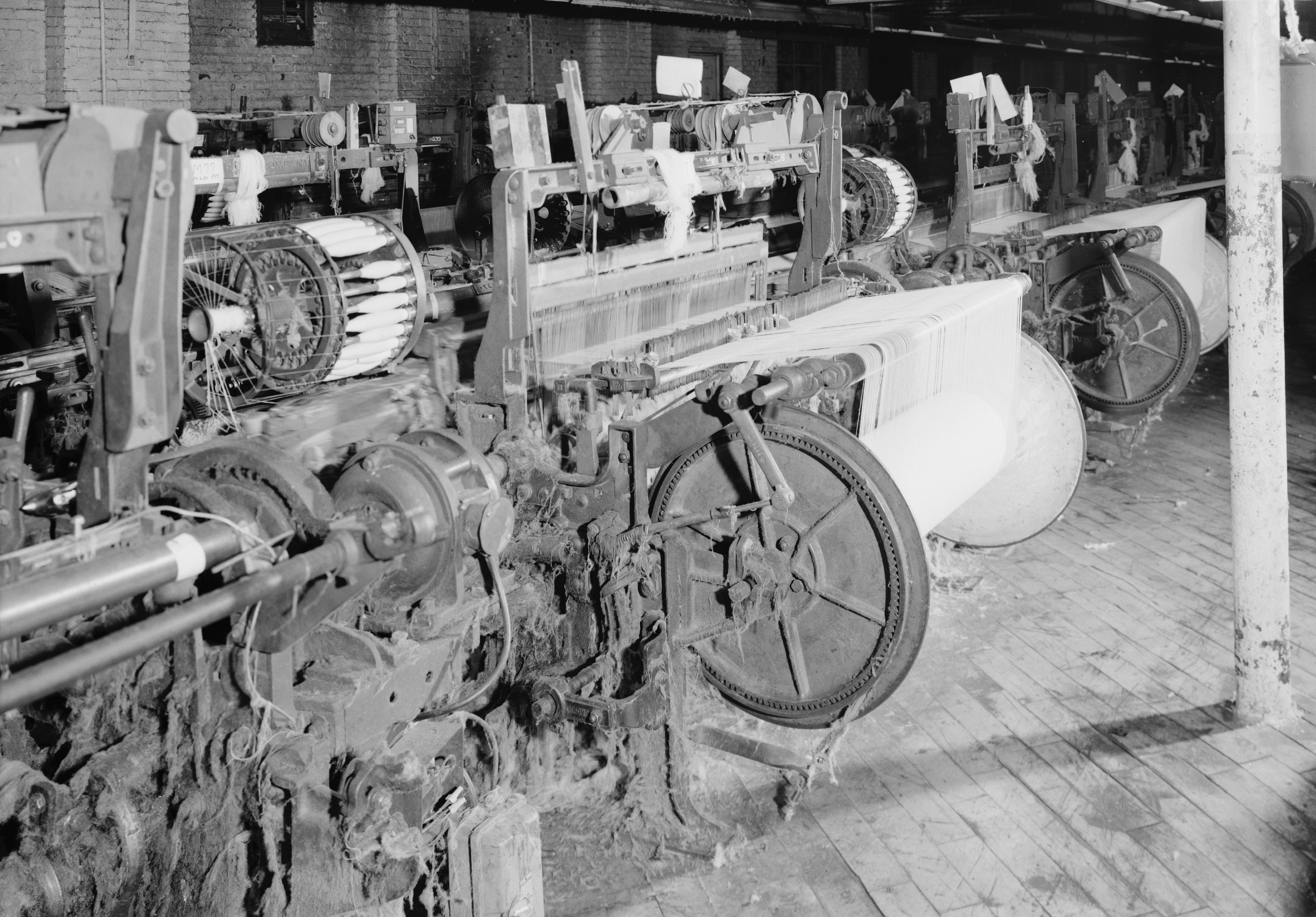
Draper Looms

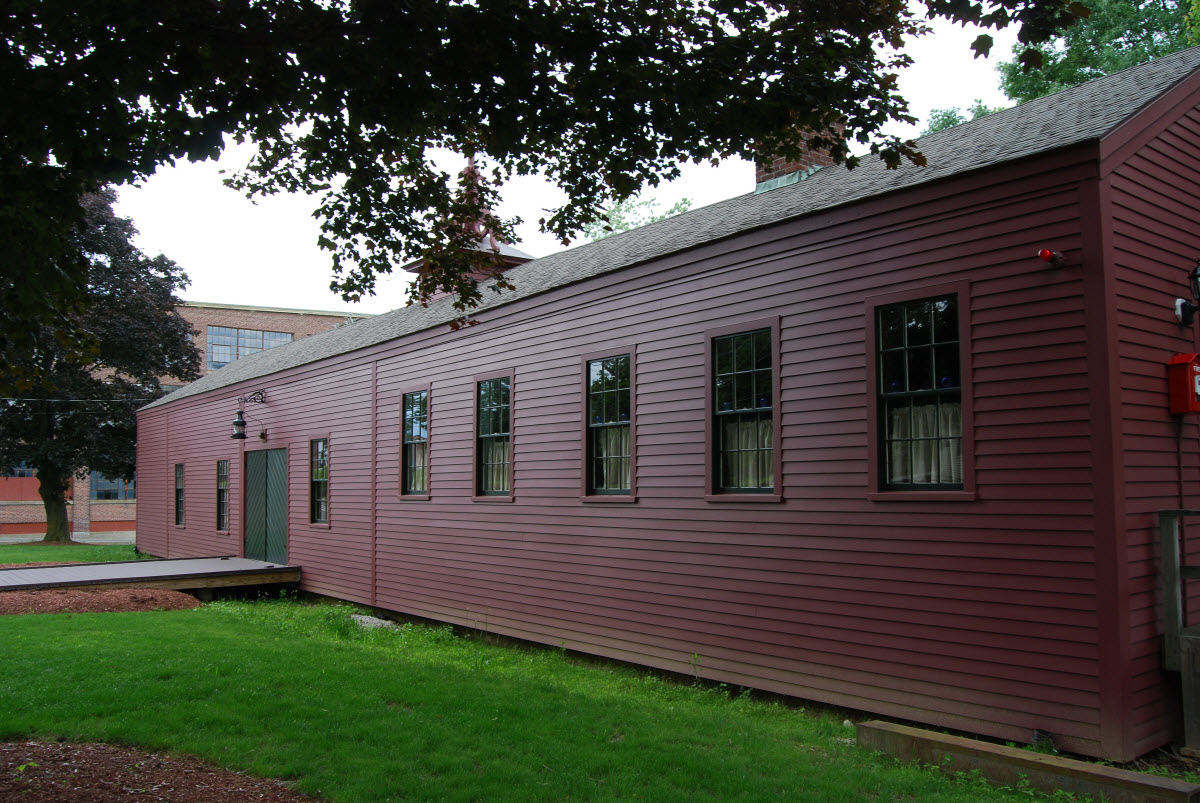
The Little Red Shop, Hopedale, Massachusetts

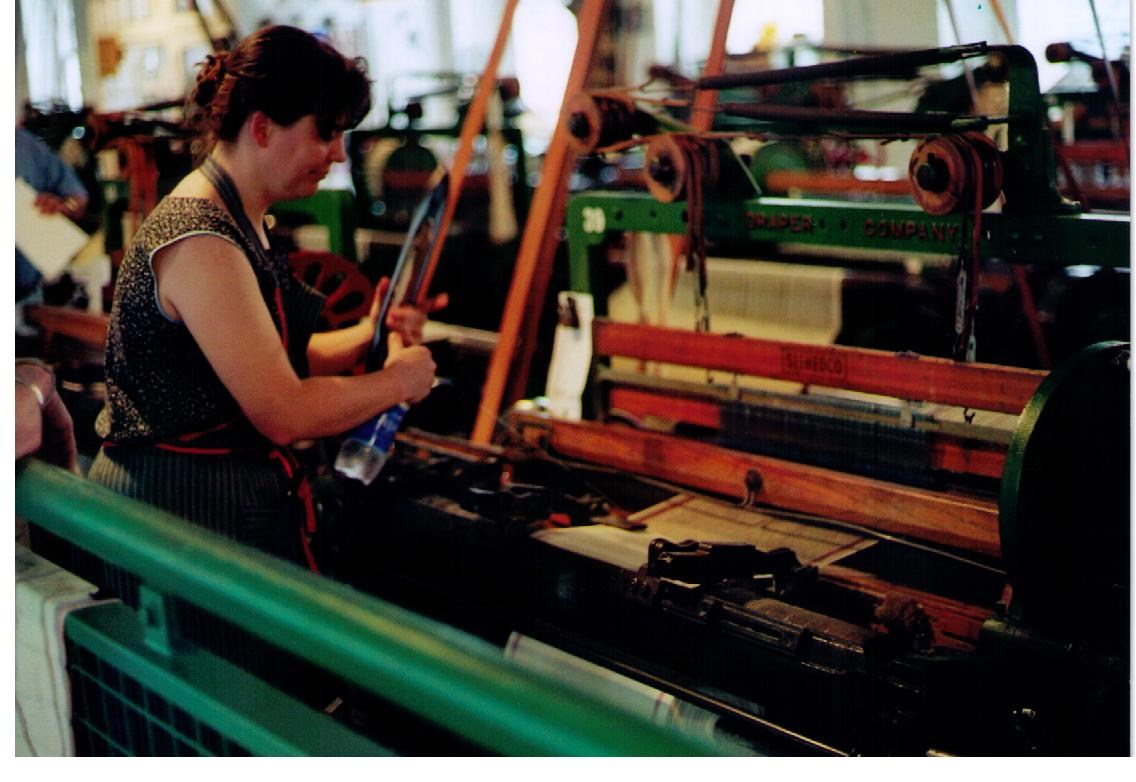
Draper Looms, Lowell, Massachusetts

The Draper Corporation was once the largest maker of power looms for the textile industry in the United States. It operated in Hopedale, Massachusetts for more than 130 years, from the 19th century until the 1970s.

== Beginnings ==
In the early 19th century, Ira Draper was a prosperous farmer from Weston, Massachusetts, with an ability for tinkering and improving machinery, such as a threshing machine that was a great improvement on any previous one made at the time. His great-great grandfather, James Draper had landed in Boston from England in 1650, and was "one of the first men in the American colonies to engage in the business of weaving and selling cloth".

In 1816, shortly after the first successful power loom in the United States was developed by Paul Moody at Waltham, Massachusetts, Ira was granted a patent on an improved flyshuttle hand loom and the first self-acting temple. A temple is part of a loom used to improve the edges of the fabric. The improvement allowed a weaver to run two power looms instead of one. Its labor-saving feature appealed to Ira, and he decided to push its sale to weavers in the area. In 1829 he took out a patent for an improvement on his original invention. In 1830 he sold his patents and the business to his eldest son, James of Wayland, Massachusetts.

Ebenezer, a younger brother, bought the business in 1837, and later moved it from Wayland to Uxbridge, Massachusetts, the center of the growing textile mill area of the Blackstone Valley. In 1841, Ebenezer moved the company to nearby Hopedale, Massachusetts, where a new Christian settlement had been formed by Adin Ballou in 1841. Known as “Fraternal Community No. 1” it was a communal association determined to create an ideal society. Hopedale was one of the most successful communal experiments of the era, but failed after fifteen years.

Another brother George came to Hopedale in 1853 to join his brother in the firm of E.D. & George Draper. A year later he bought an interest in the new Dutcher temple, then made in North Bennington, Vermont that was an improvement on previous models. Two years later, the two companies would combine forces at Hopedale and become known as W. W. Dutcher & Company. This would be the first of several industries to be located in Hopedale within the next dozen years, for all of which E.D. & George Draper became managers and agents. Among the others were the Hopedale Machine Company and Hopedale Furnace Company.

Ebenezer D. Draper retired in 1868. Over the 42 years that he was with the company, he patented many inventions that had improved the art of textile weaving.

Between 1868 and 1887 George Draper became the leader and driving force behind the company started by his father years before. After Ebenezer's retirement in 1868, the company ventured into and made improvements the developing sector of ring spinning. By 1887, George Draper owned the patent rights or controlled the sale of 12 named varieties of ring spindles. Draper also made improvements to warpers and spoolers in this period.

== The Northrop loom ==
In 1886, the three Draper Brothers of the third generation, still doing business at George Draper & Son were ready to increase their part in the loom field. They decided to undertake the design and manufacture of an automatic loom. There had been many patents of automatic devices but not one of them had ever proved practical: nor was any of them in successful operation anywhere.

The company developed two shuttle-changing looms, the Rhoades in 1888 and the Northrop in 1889. The prototypes were given field tests at the Seaconnett Mills in Fall River, Massachusetts with encouraging results. The Northrop was named after its inventor, James H. Northrop who had emigrated from Keighley, Yorkshire, England in 1881. Northrop conceived the idea of forcing the spent bobbin through and out of the shuttle and replacing it with fresh bobbin. Further developments were made, and in 1894, eight years after beginning their venture, the Draper brothers were ready to begin production of the Northrop loom for the trade. In August 1894, the first Northrop Looms to be sold to a mill were shipped from Hopedale to Queen City Cotton Mills at Burlington, Vermont. There were 729 looms in the order. The Northrop Loom relieved the weaver of much of the drudgery of her work and enabled her to run sixteen looms at once. It is a very loud device however, and the noise of hundreds operating at once in the same room must have been overwhelming. The power looms also created a lot of vibrations, which forced them to be located on the lower level of the mills, or eventually in separate weave sheds, apart from the main mill buildings.

In 1895, the Northrop Automatic Loom was patented in England, Belgium, Germany, Russia, Austria, and Spain. By 1900, Draper had sold over 60,000 Northrop Looms.

== Strike ==
Amid a wave of strikes in Massachusetts in 1913, Draper's 2,000 employees walked out on April 1 for a nine-hour day, a 22-cent minimum hourly wage, and the end of piecework. After Draper's director, the former Massachusetts governor Eben Draper rejected their demands, the workers voted to continue their strike indefinitely, supported by the Industrial Workers of the World's Joseph Coldwell. The strike disintegrated after three months.

== Later years ==
In 1917, the company became known as Draper Corporation. Focusing on looms for the cotton textile industry, Draper became part of the "Big Three" textile machinery makers in the Blackstone Valley, along with Crompton & Knowles of Worcester, Massachusetts, which focused on looms for wool, and the mighty Whitin Machine Works in nearby Whitinsville, Massachusetts which largely made spinning frames and cotton preparation machinery.

The Draper automatic looms were a significant factor in the movement of the cotton textile industry to the South during this time. Draper even financed the construction of some of new Southern mills, to be filled with their superior product. Many Northern mill owners were reluctant, or were so heavily invested in older, outdated equipment that they could not afford to make the switch.

At one time, more than 3,000 people were employed there. Long after most of the New England mills had closed, Draper continued to improve their products and sell them to the Southern textile companies, and others around the world.

In 1967, control of the Draper Corporation was passed to Rockwell International. Eventually, competition from the highly technical, increasingly computerized Japanese machinery makers led to a demise in the textile machinery industry in the Blackstone Valley. Production ceased in the mid-1970s.

A descendant of the family, Kristin Draper, is currently running Draper Knitting, a knitting mill and garment contractor.

The Draper Mill was torn down in the summer of 2021.

== See also ==
- Bancroft Memorial Library
- Hopedale, Massachusetts
- Saco-Lowell Shops
- Whitin Machine Works

=== Draper family ===
- William Franklin Draper (1842–1910)
- George A. Draper (1855–1923)
- Eben Sumner Draper (1858–1914)
- Wickliffe Draper (1891–1972)
