= Temple High School =

Temple High School may refer to:

- Temple High School (Florida)
- Temple High School (Georgia)
- Temple High School (Mississippi)
- Temple High School (Texas)
- Temple City High School (California)
