= Roberts loom =

Cast-iron power loom introduced in 1830

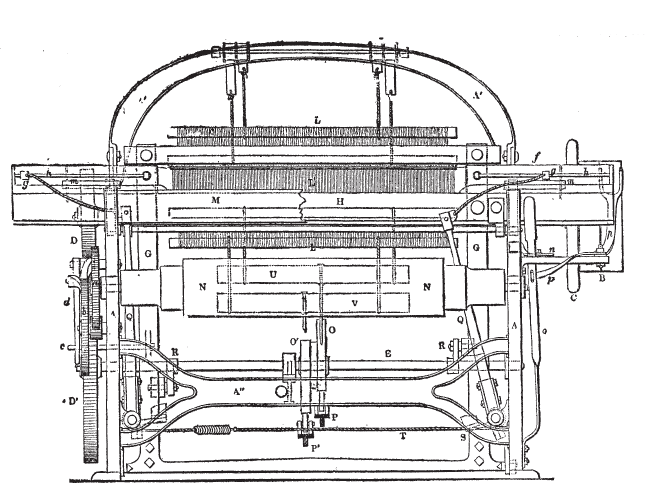
A Roberts loom

The Roberts loom was a cast-iron power loom introduced by Richard Roberts in 1830. It was the first loom that was more viable than a hand loom and was easily adjustable and reliable, which led to its widespread use in the Lancashire cotton industry.

== Richard Roberts ==
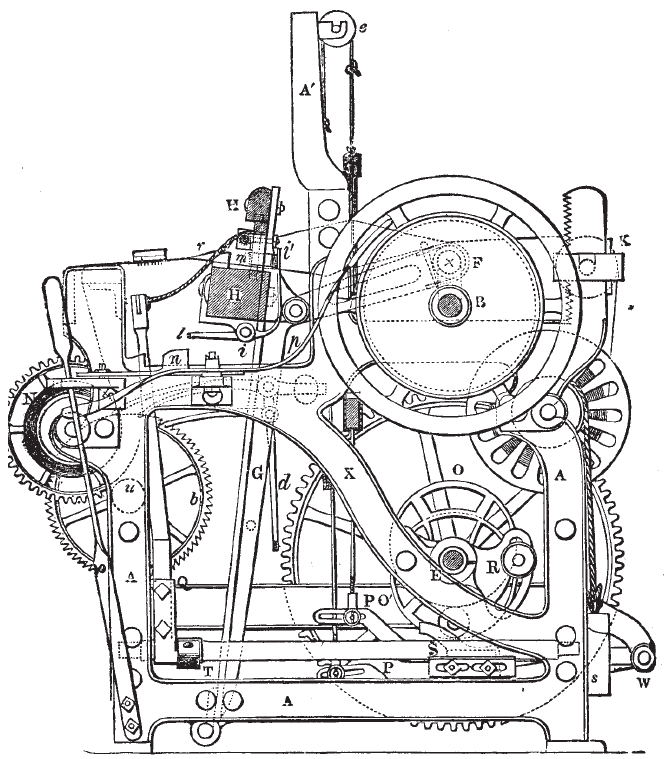
Side elevation

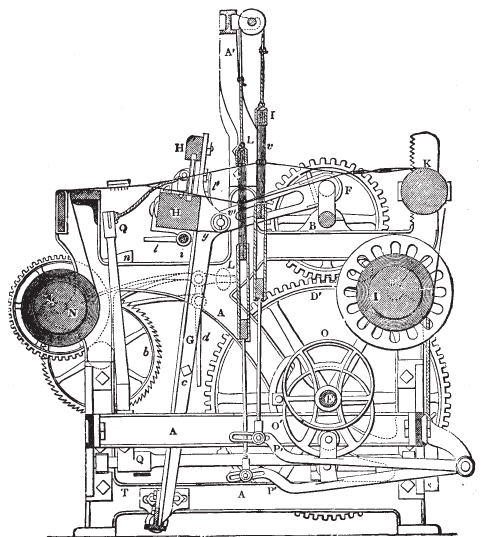
Section

Roberts was born at Llanymynech, on the border between England and Wales. He was the son of William Roberts, a shoemaker, who also kept the New Bridge tollgate. Roberts was educated by the parish priest, and early found employment with a boatman on the Ellesmere Canal and later at the local limestone quarries. He received some instruction in drawing from Robert Bough, a road surveyor, who was working under Thomas Telford.

He was responsible for developing ever more precise machine tools, working eventually from 15 Deansgate, Manchester. Here he worked on improving textile machinery. He patented the cast-iron loom in 1822 and in 1830 patented the self-acting mule thus revolutionising the production of both the spinning and weaving industries.

== The weaving process ==
The major components of the loom are the warp beam, heddles, harnesses, shuttle, reed and takeup roll. In the loom, yarn processing includes shedding, picking, battening and taking-up operations.

== The loom ==
The Roberts loom of 1830 incorporated ideas embodied in an 1822 patent.

The frame of the loom was cast iron. There were two side frames cast as single pieces. The three cross tails were machined for an accurate assembly. The great arched rail at the top supports the healds. The front and back cross rails bifurcate at each side to give a larger binding surface.

The warp passes from the warp beam, passes over a friction guide roller, where it horizontally passes through the loom to a breastbeam. Here it turns vertically to the cloth beam. Even tension is essential as any variation will lead to broken threads. As the warp beam empties its effective diameter changes making the warp slacker- tension is maintained by adding a wooden pulley to the beam, around which are two turns of rope that are attached to mill weights- thus retarding the beam through friction. The cloth beam bears a toothed wheel which works a pinion. A ratchet wheel is attached with a click level to take up the slack in the cloth. This was Roberts' invention.

The heddles are of standard construction. They are arranged in groups of four, obviously even threads and odd must go up and down alternatively but two heddles are used for the evens and two for the odds so adjacent threads do not rub. The lower end of the heddle leaves is attached to treadles or marches. These are depressed by cam referred to as eccentrics..

The loom is powered by a leather steam-belt which drives the driving shaft. Here there is a flywheel to smooth the motion and a crank mechanism to drive the battens (swords) and a toothed wheel. This engages a second shaft known as the tappet shaft or wiper shaft whose job is to lower the treadles and throw the shuttle. This turns half the speed of the driving shaft, so its toothed wheel is twice the size.

The shuttle is thrown by two levers attached to the side frame, but activated by a friction roller on the tappet shaft. As the shuttle enters the shuttle-box at the end of its travel, it depresses a lever which acts as a brake. If this lever is not depressed then the loom is stopped.

== Economics ==
The Roberts was made at a time when the power loom industry was set to expand. Until this moment, hand looms were more common than power looms. The reliable Roberts loom was quickly adopted and again it was the spinning side that was short of capacity. Roberts then addressed this, with the construction of a self-acting (automatic) spinning mule. Essentially, textile production was no longer a skilled craft but an industrial process that could be manned by semi-skilled labour. Mule spinning became the man's occupation, and weaving a girl's occupation.

Number of Looms in UK
Year	1803	1820	1829	1833
Looms	2,400	14,650	55,500	100,000
