= Comet Tempel =

Comet Tempel may refer to any of the following comets discovered by Wilhelm Tempel below:

- Either of these numbered periodic comets:
  - 9P/Tempel, Comet Tempel 1
  - 10P/Tempel, Comet Tempel 2
- Any of these long-period comets:
  - C/1859 G1
  - C/1860 U1
  - C/1863 V1
  - C/1864 N1
  - C/1869 T1
  - C/1871 L1
  - C/1871 V1
  - C/1877 T1
- A partial reference to either of these comets:
  - 11P/Tempel–Swift–LINEAR
  - 55P/Tempel–Tuttle
