= Power-loom riots =

Handloom weaver protest of power looms in 1826

The power-loom riots of 1826 took place in Lancashire, England, in protest against the economic hardship suffered by traditional handloom weavers caused by the widespread introduction of the much more efficient power loom. Rioting broke out on 24 April and continued for three days, widely supported by the local population, who were sympathetic to the weavers' plight.

The rioting ended after 20 or so of the ringleaders were arrested. Some local manufacturers subsequently attempted to introduce a minimum wage for weavers, but were unable to obtain the support of the UK government to enforce it.

== Background ==
England suffered economically in the years immediately following the end of the Napoleonic Wars in 1815, and in the textile towns of the industrial north wages fell sharply as the factory system was developed. In Bolton alone, 1500 of the town's 6000 handloom weavers were out of work in 1826, and 1500 were on half work. A weaver who in 1792 could have expected to earn six shillings a day was by 1826 earning less than six shillings a week for a sixteen-hour day, in a period when the price of staples such as bread, cheese and meat had almost doubled.

== Course of events ==
Rioting broke out in the east of Lancashire on 24 April 1826. The first of 21 mills to be attacked was the Higher Grange Lane Factory in Accrington. The rioters marched on to Blackburn on the second day. On the third and final day of rioting the military were called upon to defend a mill in Chatterton against 3000 rioters, six of whom were shot and killed when the crowd refused to disperse after the Riot Act had been read to them.

== Popular support ==
The rioters were widely supported locally, and not only by fellow handloom weavers. Amongst those arrested in Blackburn, for instance, were labourers, a farmer, a confectioner, a butcher and even power-loom weavers. An eye-witness to the rioting in Chorley noted that "there can be no doubt that a great multitude of the townspeople were their friends. The women supplied the rioters with stones, concealing the missiles under their aprons."

Some of the soldiers sent to confront the rioters seemed sympathetic to their plight. One 16-year-old handloom weaver from Haslingden, Thomas Duckworth, records that on the first day of rioting the group he was marching with encountered a number of mounted soldiers approaching them with drawn swords. The officers in charge appealed to the mob to disperse, warning of the consequences if they did not. In Duckworth's own words:

Some of the old fellows from the mob spoke. They said "What are we to do? We're starving. Are we to starve to death?" The soldiers were fully equipped with haversacks and they emptied their sandwiches among the crowd. Then the soldiers left and there was another meeting. Were the power-looms to be broken or not? Yes, it was decided, they must be broken at all cost.

== Suppression and aftermath ==
The riots ended after local magistrates swore in a large number of special constables to arrest about 20 of the ringleaders "in the dead of night". During the course of the rioting more than 1000 power looms were destroyed. A number of manufacturers subsequently agreed to pay a standard rate to the weavers, but on their own admission it was a "starvation" wage. The manufacturers who stuck to the agreement found it difficult to compete with those who did not, and could therefore undercut them, prompting an appeal to William Huskisson, the President of the Board of Trade, to introduce a legally binding minimum wage. Huskisson's response was dismissive, expressing his view that to introduce such a measure would be "a vain and hazardous attempt to impose the authority of the law between the labourer and his employer in regulating the demand for labour and the price to be paid for it".
