= Temple Mountain (Idaho) =

Mountain in Idaho, United States

Coordinates: 48°44′20″N 116°43′14″W

Temple Mountain was a 6,693-foot (2,040 m) summit in Boundary County, Idaho, United States.

Temple Mountain was so named because its massive outline had the shape of a temple.
