= Seaconnett Mills =

- Clover Leaf Mills
- U.S. National Register of Historic Places
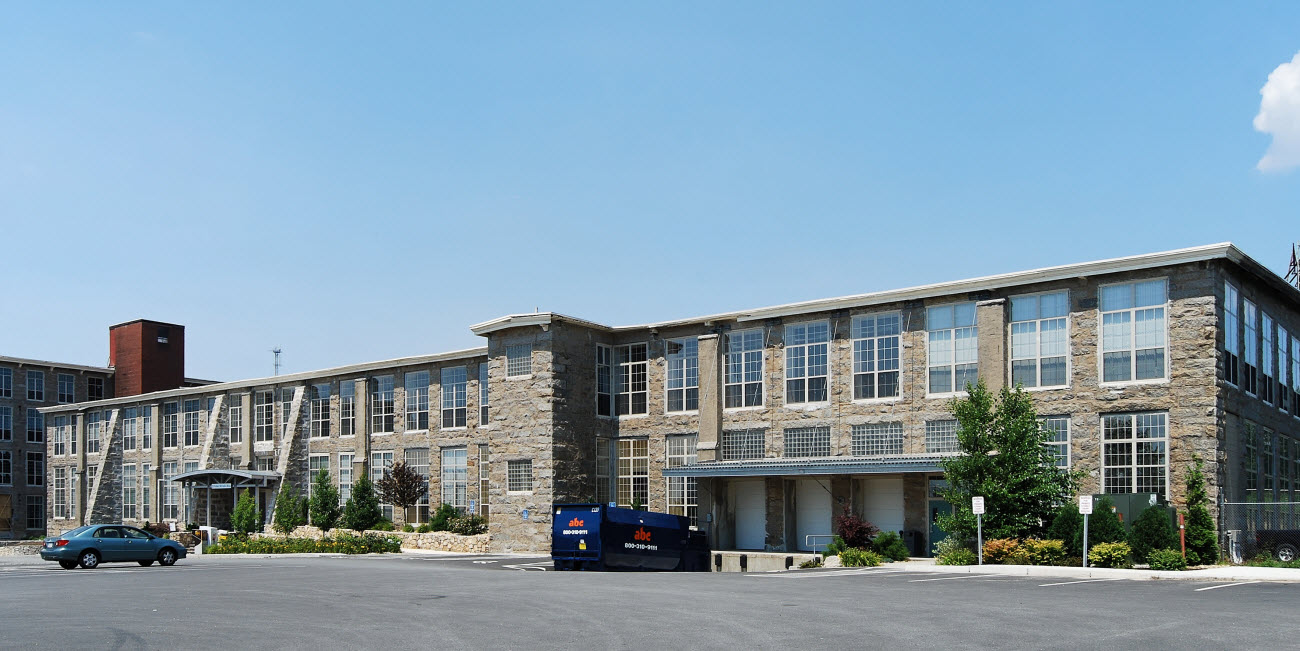

- Location within Massachusetts Location within the United States
- Location: 1 & 21 Father DeValles Blvd., Fall River, Massachusetts
- Coordinates: 41°41′0″N 71°8′10″W
- Area: 10.4 acres (4.2 ha)
- Built: 1884
- MPS: Fall River MRA
- NRHP reference No.: 83000716
- Added to NRHP: February 16, 1983

Clover Leaf Mills (or formerly known as Seaconnet Mills) is a historic cotton textile mill complex located at 1 & 21 Father DeValles Boulevard in Fall River, Massachusetts. Begun in 1884, the mill is a good example of 1880s industrial architecture. The site was added to the National Register of Historic Places in 1983.

== Description ==
Clover Leaf Mills complex is located in an isolated but highly visible setting southeast of the western interchange between Interstate 195 and Massachusetts Route 24 in eastern Fall River. It includes two large stone buildings (the main spinning mill and the weave shed), joined by a narrow hyphen, with a cluster of ancillary buildings attached to the west side of the spinning mill. The spinning mill is a long rectangular four-story building with an exterior of rustically dressed granite blocks, and is oriented north–south. The weave shed is two stories in height, and is oriented east–west. The cluster of outbuildings include a boiler house, picker house, and a brick chimney.

== History ==
Mill No. 1 (the spinning mill) was built in 1884, while Mill No. 2 (the weave shed) was built in the 1890s. Henry C. Lincoln was the first president of the company, which had a peak capacity of 72,000 spindles. In October 1889, the very first operational trial of the Draper Northrop automatic loom was made at the Seaconnet Mills. Further trials and improvements to the Northrop loom were made over the next year or so. In the following decades, the Northrop automatic loom would revolutionize the weaving industry, allowing a single operator to manage multiple looms at the same time.

In 1930 the Seaconnett Mills were taken over by the Howard-Arthur Company. In 2001, the name of Seaconnett Mills was changed to Clover Leaf Mills for its centered position within the location of the highway interchange. The mill site has been recently restored into an office park.

== See also ==
- National Register of Historic Places listings in Fall River, Massachusetts
- List of mills in Fall River, Massachusetts
