= Temple (weaving) =

Adjustable stretcher used on a loom

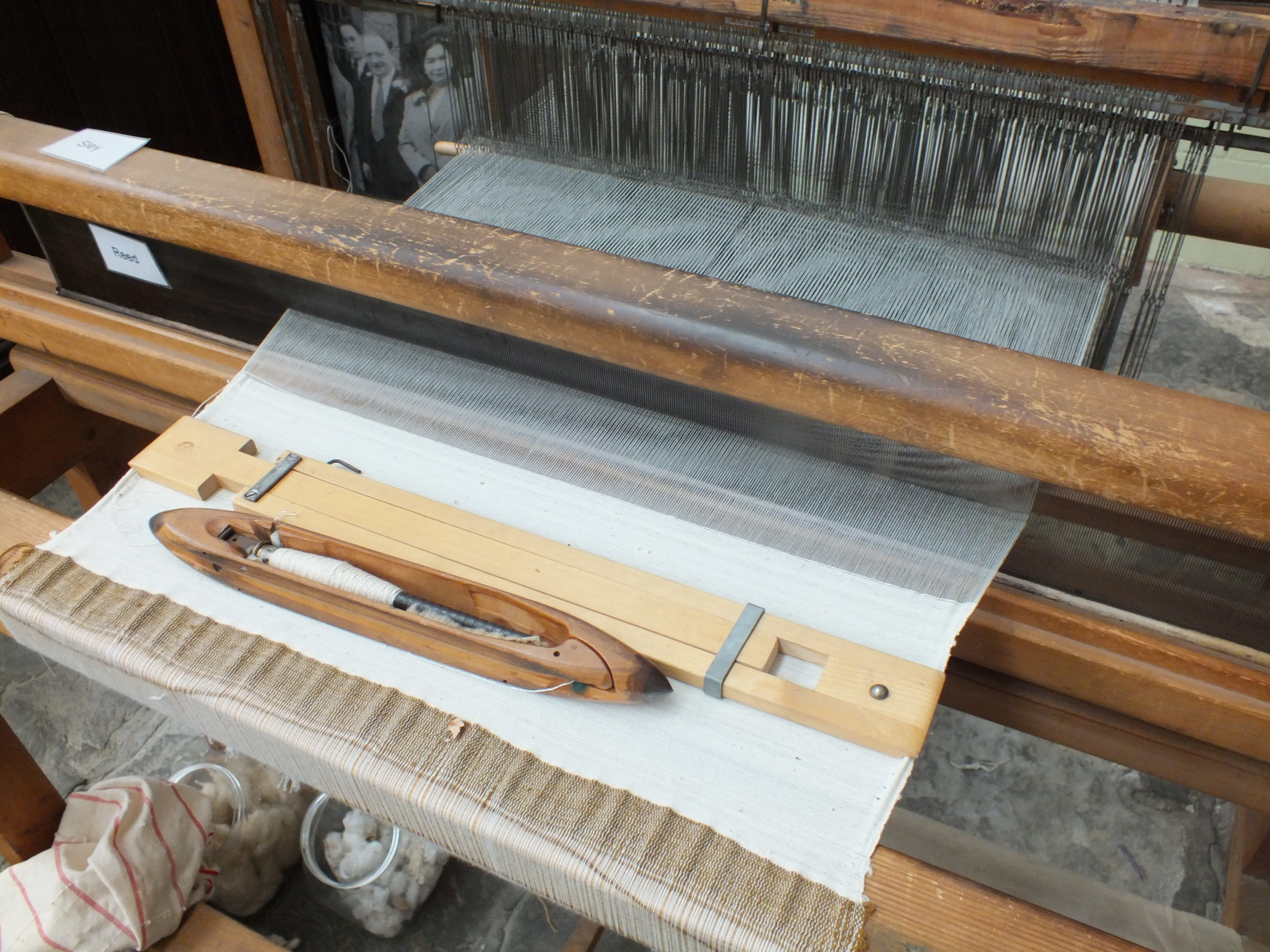
A wooden temple on a loom

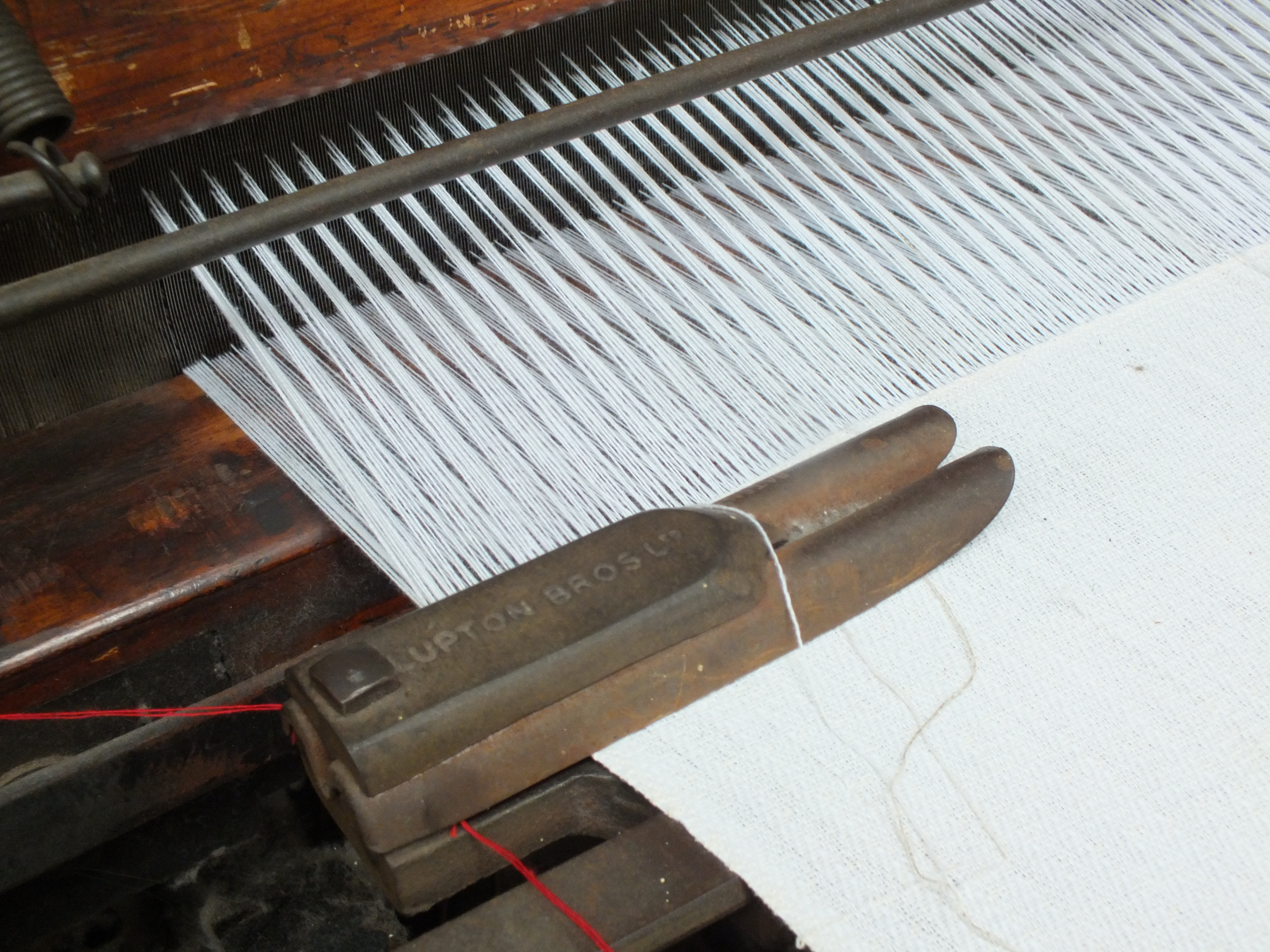
A metal temple

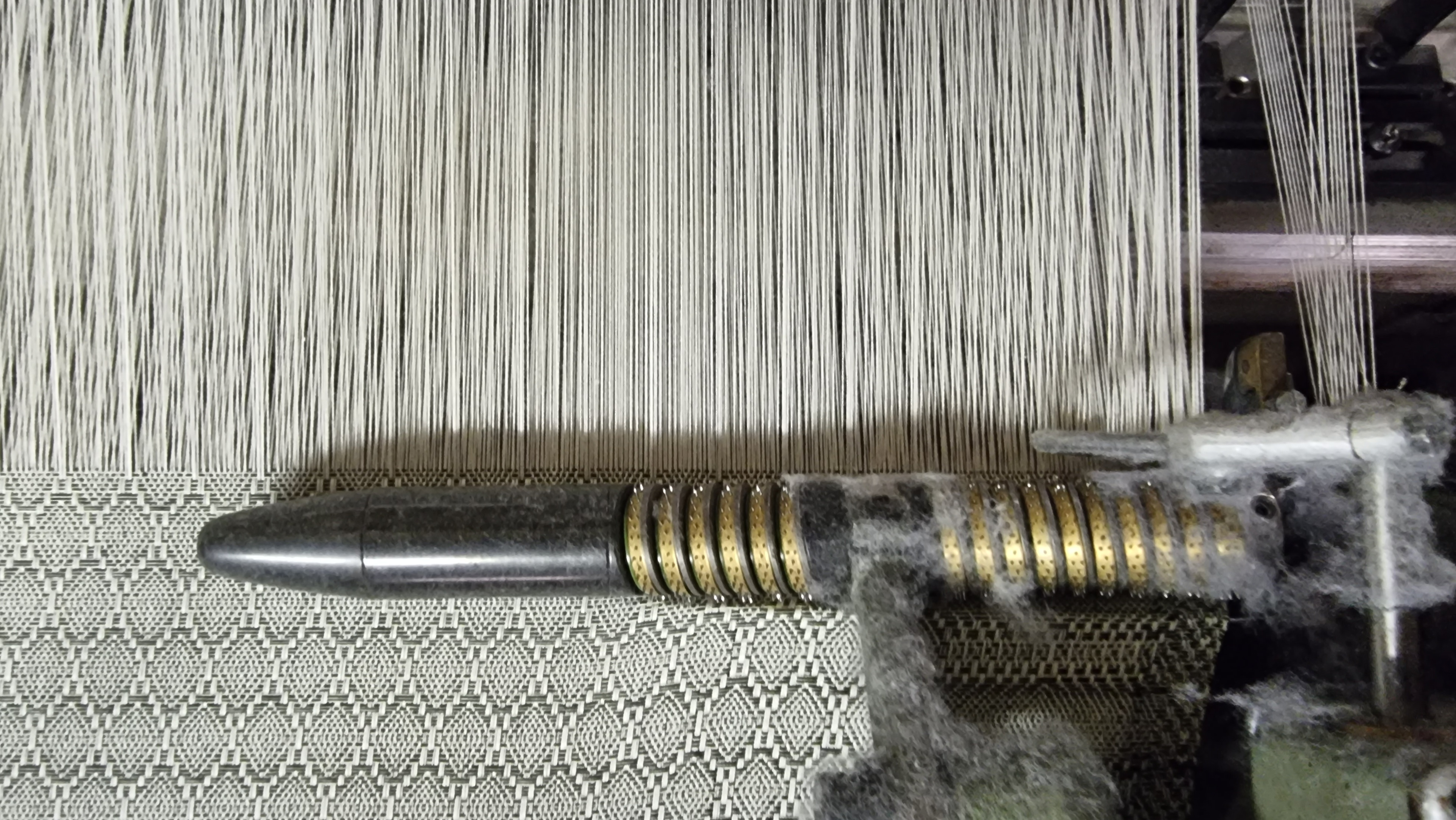
Helical temple on a Jacquard loom

A temple is an adjustable stretcher used on a loom to maintain the width and improve the edges of the woven fabric.

== Function ==
During the process of weaving, fabrics can decrease in width (draw in) due to the interlacement of the weft material. Temples prevent this decrease by keeping fabrics at a fixed width, thus requiring more weft to enter the weave with each pass of the shuttle. Fabric produced without draw-in has a smoother selvage, weft can be packed in more evenly, and warp threads are less likely to break from excessive friction in the reed.

== Use of temples ==
There are two main types of temples: metal and wood. Both types have a shaft, whose length can be adjusted, and sharp prongs at each end to attach to the fabric. Wooden temples tend to be lighter and have straight, fine teeth. The teeth on metal temples are angled and are wider at the base than the teeth on wooden temples. Metal temples are often recommended for rugs because the size and angle of the teeth are better for gripping the thick edges.

To use a temple, the length is first adjusted so that it matches the total width (or spread) of warp threads in the reed. The prongs are then inserted into the fabric, on each side, at the very edges of the cloth. The temple must be moved frequently to keep it close to the fell of the fabric, where the weaving is taking place.
