= Harle Syke Mill =

Weaving shed in Lancastershire, England

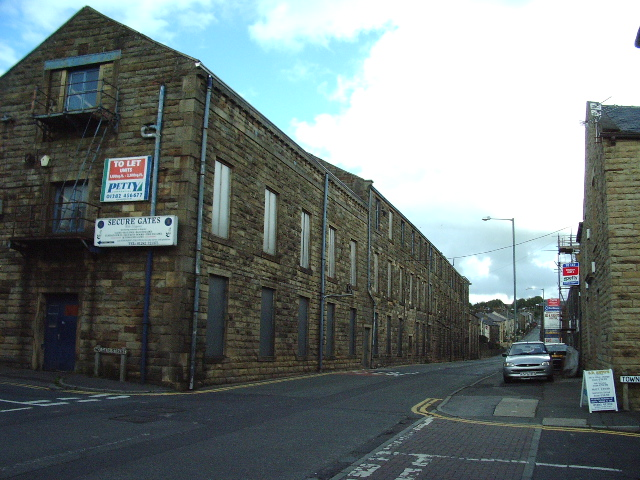
- The Burnley Road frontage of Oxford mill

- Location within the Borough of Burnley

Weaving mill
- Architectural style: Single storey
- Location: Harle Syke, Burnley, Lancashire, England
- Owner: Haggate Joint Stock Company
- Further ownership: Harle Syke Mill Company (1904)
- Coordinates: 53.8120°N 2.2045°W

Construction
- Built: 1856
- Completed: 1856
- Floor count: 1

Power
- Date: 1904
- Engine maker: Burnley Ironworks
- Engine type: Cross compound
- Valve Gear: Corliss valves
- rpm: 76
- Installed horse power (ihp): 700hp
- Flywheel diameter: 18"6'
- Transmission type: Rope

Boiler configuration
- Boilers: Twin Lancashire boilers, coal fired
- Pressure: 160

Equipment
- Date: 1904, 1906
- Manufacturer: Harling & Todd
- No. of looms: 1700+

Harle Syke mill is a weaving shed in Briercliffe on the outskirts of Burnley, Lancashire, England. It was built on a green field site in 1856, together with terraced houses for the workers. These formed the nucleus of the community of Harle Syke. The village expanded and six other mills were built, including Queen Street Mill.

The Haggate Joint Stock Commercial Company opened it in 1858 as a production mill, but re-organised it in 1865 to become a 'room and power' company. Seven producer partnerships were formed by the shareholders who had been allocated looms on a pro rata basis. The companies consolidated into 4 main businesses. Shares in the room and power 'walls' company were traded resulting in a smaller number of shareholders with larger investments. In 1903, the 'walls' liquidated passing assets to the Harle Syke Mill Company which built a new larger shed, jokingly called Siberia Shed after a delay in providing a heating system. The new mill engine which is now displayed in the Science Museum, London, where it is run on occasions under steam power. The older part of the building is called Oxford Mill.

== Location ==
Harle Syke Mill, (now known as Oxford Mill and Siberia Mill), lies within Harle Syke, a suburb of Burnley, 4 km from the town centre, in the civil parish of Briercliffe with Extwistle. It lies 22 miles (35 km) north of Manchester and 26 miles (42 km) east of Preston. Harle Syke is on high ground to the south of the River Calder near the M65. Haggate was the older hamlet and it is there one finds the nearest public houses and Baptist chapel. The later mills in Harle Syke are Briercliffe Mill (1880), Walshaw Mill (1905), Queen Street Mill (1894), Primrose Mill (1905), and King's Mill (1912).

== History ==
Until the mid eighteenth century the agricultural workers on Briercliffe would supplement their income by having a wooden handloom at home where they would weave coarse woollen and mixed fabric cloth. Between 1770 and 1820, the huge increase in the availability of cheap machine spun cotton caused many families to leave the land and the whole family would start to weave cotton. It was their main source of income. In 1830, there were 171 Briercliffe families running 606 looms. This involved 968 persons: the population of the parish had expanded from 956 to 1755. Most worked in the existing farmhouses or the newly built weavers' cottages with the loom shop above the living space. These were in Haggate, Lane Bottom, and Holt Hill. Country weavers were paid by piece-rate and were vulnerable to the varying market conditions, and unlike the weavers in towns who formed combinations to organise collective industrial action, they accepted the hardship. During the final boom years of the 1820s, the spinning mill owners used the increased profits to invest in power looms which were installed in weaving sheds in or alongside the steam driven spinning mills. The 1830s were a time of hardship, and the population declined to 1498. The other employment was in the stone quarries. In Lane Bottom there was 'handloom factory' owned by the Smith family of Hill End, but there and in their cottage loomshops, handloom weavers competed for ever decreasing work in the sections of weaving for which the powerloom had not been adapted. Briercliffe had the labour but did not have available capital switch its economy to factory production.

=== Smith's Mill ===
The power loom arrived in Briercliffe in 1848. The only family in Briercliffe that had any capital were the Smiths of Hill End. William Smith as the owner of a handloom factory was under the same pressures as individual rural hand loom weavers- and needed to modernise. In 1848, he opened Hill End Shed, a power loom shed with 400 looms at Lane Bottom. It employed 220 powerloom weavers half of whom were under twenty, 60% of them came from the village of Lane Bottom and only ten came from Haggate. Hand loom weaving using the domestic system still continued with 317 families in the district containing a handloom weaver. In Haggate there were 25 adult male handloom weavers. (Note: The 1851 census has been analysed and compared with previous censuses. It shows the transition) When Hill End Mill was fully staffed, there was low staff turnover and it was never expanded. Though the power loom offered a better living than the domestic system or quarrying there were no mills to offer further jobs.

=== The Haggate Joint Stock Commercial Company, 1856 ===
The 1844 Joint Stock Companies Act, pioneered by Sir Robert Peel made it possible for a group of workers to combine to form a legal company. This became a popular thing to do: the New Bacup and Wardle Commercial Company was one of the first. Some groups included in their articles of association 'co-operative principles' such as 'democracy'. Each worker invested a sum of money in shares in the company. Not all the investors would work in that mill, and some investors bought large numbers of shares. When the company made a profit, some of this was returned to the investor as a 'dividend'.

The Haggate Joint Stock Commercial Company achieved provisional registration on 27 March 1856 and registered 12 June and authorised to trade from 1 July 1856. It had thirteen promoters: nine weavers, two quarrymen, one beamer and one farmer. Ten came from villages in Briercliffe. Five were named as directors: William Smith (weaver), (Note: Not the same William Smith as the one from Hill End Mill.) Robert Emmott (beamer), John Bradshaw (weaver from Burnley), Thomas Taylor (tackler) and Jonathan Duerden (quarryman). The proposed capital was £5000-0-0 in 500 shares of £10-0-0, and the place of business Haggate. There were 64 original shareholders- 45 of whom were weavers. Twenty-eight were illiterate signing papers with a cross. The 64 shareholders had taken up 152 shares pledging £1520- but this sum would be paid in installments. There was one shareholders meeting a year where the directors and auditor were elected. This was not a limited liability company so on failure, shareholders would be liable for unlimited sums.

The Haggate Joint Stock Commercial Company bought a piece of flat land adjacent to the Harle Syke brook, close to the new Anglican church outside Haggate on the Burnley Road, and proceeded to build a 300 loom shed with space for a steam engine. With capital of only £1520- far short of the £5000 needed, they would have to go into debt and borrow short term 'loan money' at 4%, as £1520 in itself would only buy the looms needed.

The mill was in full production at the end of 1857. While weavers elsewhere were striking for higher wages- the weaver owners of Haggate were working overtime- and on one occasion breaching the Ten Hour Act. At the end of five years in 1861 the company was trading profitably and investors decided to extend the shed. In 1862, Cotton stopped arriving due to the infamous Cotton Famine, the mills stopped with only 60 of Briercliffe's 360 weavers working. Though the situation reverted in 1864, the Haggate Joint Stock Commercial Company decided to restructure.

=== Room and power ===
The decision was that Haggate Joint Stock Commercial Company should become a 'buildings company', offering room and power and to cease manufacturing. The 300 or so looms were distributed to the shareholders, each of share would attract five looms. As many of the weavers in the mill were also shareholders- they could continue their business by becoming tenants and renting power from the buildings company. Groups of weavers pooled their looms and formed new production companies which in time coalesced into larger companies. Some companies took their looms to others mills or expanded their operations elsewhere. Harle Syke mill quickly gained a reputation as a nursery for fledgling companies. (Note: In Lancashire each of these producer companies would be called a mill, so later Harle Syke Mill would house two mills, and today the name of the building has been all but lost, but the name Oxford Mill and Siberia Mill live on.) Two companies eventually dominated the shed: 'Simpson and West' who expanded into Belle Vue Mill in Burnley; and 'James Thornton and Co'.

=== Harle Syke Mill Company 1903 ===
In 1903 the five directors of the Haggate Joint Stock Company liquidated the mill. The decision was forced by the need to replace the 1856 steam engine, an expense that could not be justified if the building were to remain a room and power mill. The directors had other business interest in Burnley and were aware of the market. All the assets were passed to the Harle Syke Mill Company who continued to provide 'room and power facilities' to the two remaining tenants. The new company replaced the steam engine, built a new weaving shed stocked it with 900 looms and started to manufacture cloth again after a break of forty years. The existing Haggate Joint Stock Company £10 shares were valued at £25, and each share holder got paid off in shares in the new Harle Syke Mill Company.

=== The Long decline ===
The first war had little effect on weaving, and the peace dividend caused a boom and inflation. The profits were transferred to the shareholders in the form of bonus shares. In 1921 the economy crashed and the company entered a twenty-year period of austerity. Cotton Control in World War 2 forced cotton companies to reduce its capacity, in 1941 Harle Syke Mill had only 380 looms running and Queen Street Manufacturing Company moved into the bottom shop. Hagbergham Mill, Burnley moved into James Thornton & Co's space and they moved in with Harle Syke in the top shop. After the war, things were reversed but key overseas markets had been permanently lost.

James Thornton & Co went out of business in 1952 and it shed was taken on by the Oxford Mill Company. Harle Syke Mill Company closed the bottom shed that year.

Harle Syke Mill closed in September 1959 when the shareholders agreed to join the Conservative government's Cotton Industry Reorganisation Scheme 1959 whereby compensation was given for each loom destroyed. The firm wove out and smashed the looms the workforce was made redundant. A Manchester firm Manifold Textiles moved into Siberia trading as Finsley View Manufacturing Company, took on the workers and continued in production until 1970.

The weaving sheds of both the 1856 building and the 1903 shed have been modified, some parts have been demolished to provide parking, but were still occupied in 2013. In 2010 planning permission was given to convert the Burnley Road warehouse into 12 residential apartments, a clinic and nursery. Some of the weaving shed would be cleared and houses built.

== Operations in a weaving mill ==
When yarn enters a weaving mill, the warp is usually already on a beam and the weft is on different size cops and cheeses. The weft has to be wound onto pirns to fit in the shuttles suitable for installed looms. The beam with 2000 or more ends is placed in the Cylinder Tape Sizing Machine. The threads pass through the size to stiffen them and reduce friction. The size is a mixture of flour soft soap and tallow. The ends are dried over steam-heated cylinders and wound onto the final beam, the weavers beam.

The weavers beam is now placed on the Drawing-in frame. Here each end is passed through the healds, and then through a reed. This job was done by a reacher-in and a loomer. The reacher-in, who would be young and usually a boy, passed each end in order through to the loomer. Alternatively, if the loom had already run that cloth, a short length of the previous warp thread could be left on the healds and reed, and a Barber Colman knotter ties the old ends to the new. This process took 20 minutes, considerably faster than starting afresh. Spare healds and reeds are stored above head height for that purpose.

The loomed weavers beam is taken into the weaving shed, where it gaited to the loom by a tackler. One weaver would tenter 6, or 8 Lancashire Looms, which would be kept working by a tackler. Nine hundred looms Harling & Todd of Burnley, Lancashire looms of this period required 250 weavers and 9 tacklers.

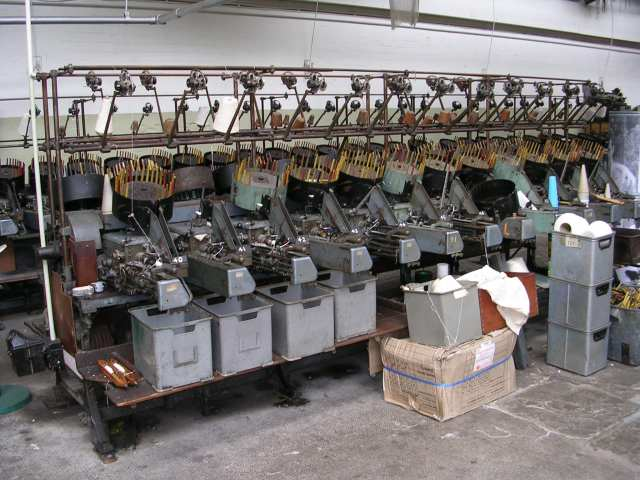
Pirning

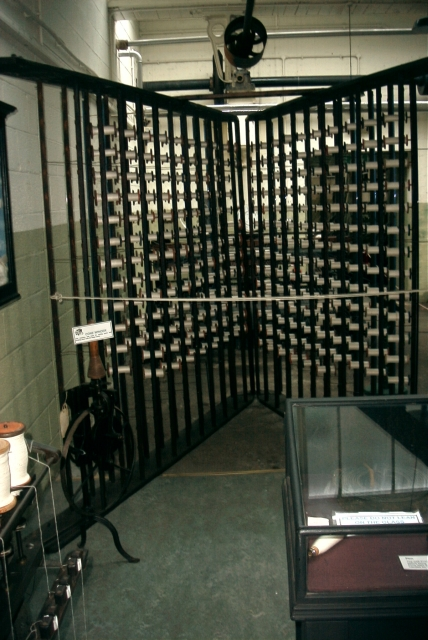
Bobbins for Beaming frame- when warp was not bought on the beam.

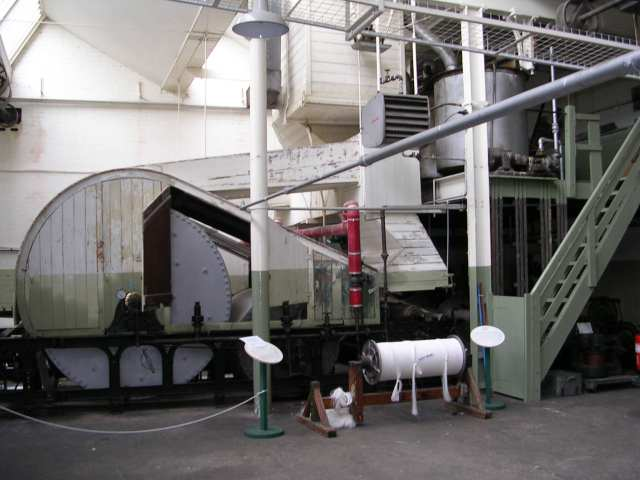
Cylinder Sizer

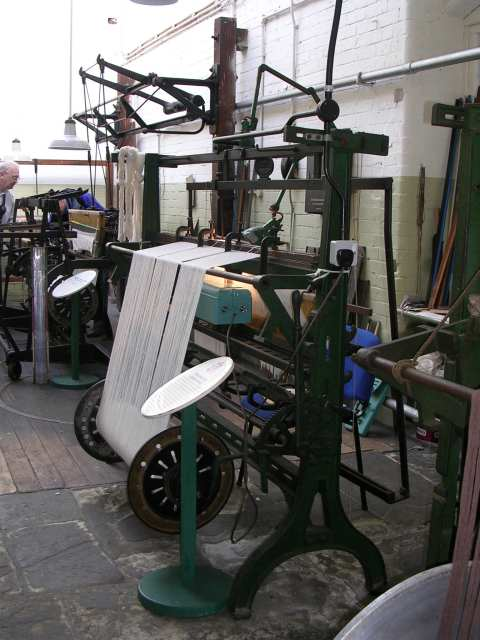
Drawing-in frame

== The 1903 mill ==
=== Architecture ===
As originally built the weaving shed was about 51 metres (167 ft) by 34 metres (112 ft), with the typical north facing roof lights (windows) giving natural light fronted on Burnley Road, by a two-storey 9 metres (30 ft) wide warehouse. The 1903 extension involved leasing 8,000 square yards (6,700 m^{2}) of adjoining land and building a new weaving shed, which housed 990 looms and was 50 metres (160 ft) by 46 metres (151 ft), doubling the size of the weaving floor. This shed is known as top shed or Siberia due to it starting up before the steam heating pipes were working. A new warehouse was built at right angles to the existing one fronting Burnley Road.

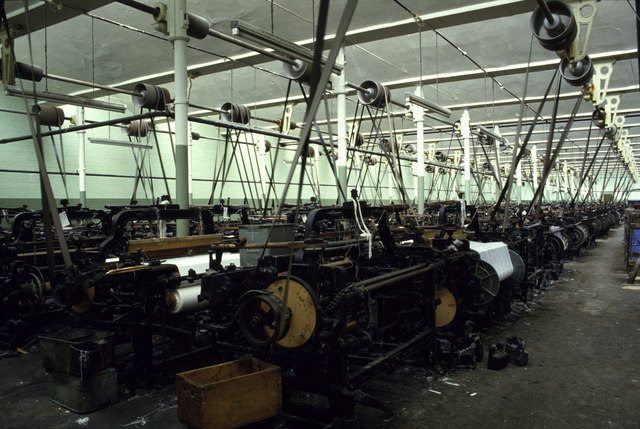
A weaving shed in the neighbouring mill

=== Power ===
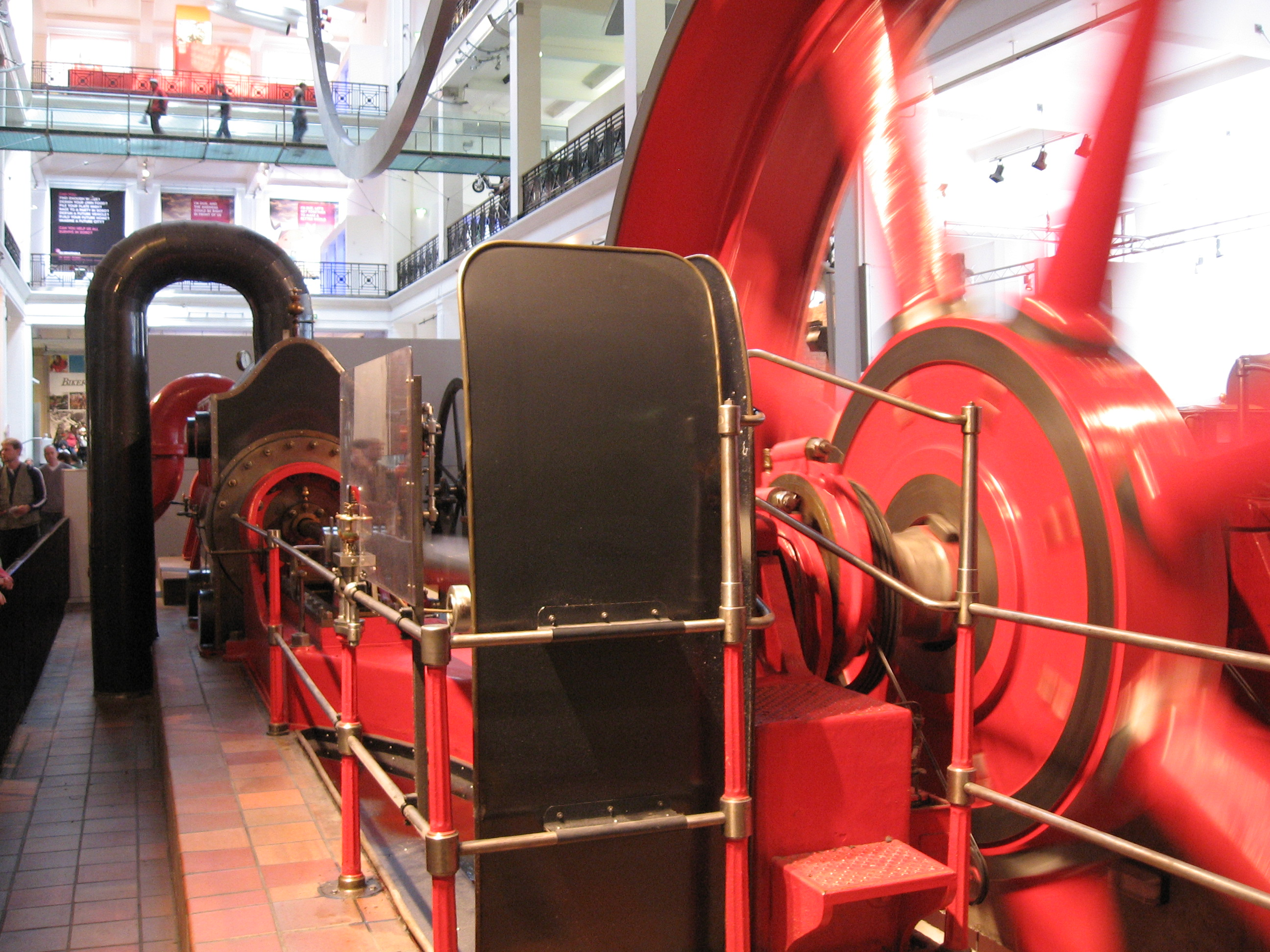
The Burnley Iron works, Corliss valved 700 horsepower (520 kW) engine, now displayed in the London Science Museum

Steam is raised by two Lancashire boilers built by Oldham Ironworks costing £900. The steam raised to 160 psi in the boiler house drives a 700 horsepower (520 kW) cross compound horizontal stationary steam engine, built by the Burnley Iron Works (formerly Marslands).The high-pressure cylinder (HP) is 17 inches (43 cm) and the low-pressure (LP) 39 inches (99 cm). It uses Corliss valves. The engine drives a 18 feet 6 inches (5.64 m) flywheel running at 76 rpm.

=== Equipment ===
The initial order for top shop was for 900 plain Lancashire looms with a 40 inches (1,000 mm) reedspace, five companies tendered and the Harling and Todd won the contract supplying looms at £5-12-0 a piece. They were delivered by April 1904. In 1905 William West moved out of bottom shop and a further 416 Harling and Todd looms were purchased at £6-0-0 each. In addition Harling and Todd provided five cop winding frames. Howard and Bullough provided two tapes (tape sizing machines) and eight beaming frames.

=== Staff ===
The first to be appointed were Thomas Bannister the company secretary and salesman at £2-10-0 a week, John Taylor the chief overlooker and 'inside manager' at £2-2-0 a week. There were seven tacklers and then beamers and loomers. The book-keeper and wages clerk earned £1-4-0, the two labourers earned £1-2-0 while several cut-lookers (warehousemen) received £1-0-0. When the bottom shop was vacated, an additional three tacklers, two beamers and a taper were employed. The number of weavers was not recorded in the directors' minutes, but there appear to be around 300. John Taylor was a director and shareholder but also an employee as were many others and it was this that made the 'Harle Syke model' unique.

== Owners and Tenants ==
During the period between 1865 and 1903, the room and power mill was home to many manufacturing companies. Some prospered, expanded and moved to Burnley and elsewhere; names such as Altham, Burrows, Emmott, Forster, Heasandford, Spencer, Thornton, and Walton.

== See also ==
- Cotton mill
- Helmshore Mills Textile Museum
- Queen Street Mill
- St James's, Briercliffe
- Textile manufacturing
