= Harle Syke =

Village in Lancashire, England

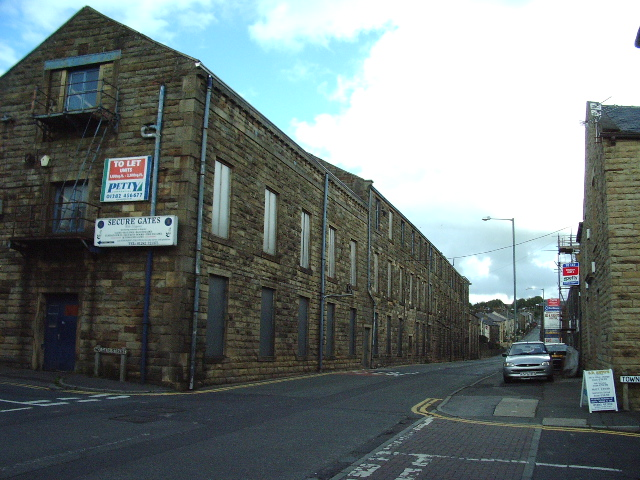
- Oxford Mill, part of Harle Syke Mill

- Shown within Burnley Borough Location within Lancashire
- OS grid reference: SD864350
- Civil parish: Briercliffe with Extwistle
- District: Burnley
- Shire county: Lancashire
- Region: North West
- Country: England
- Sovereign state: United Kingdom
- Post town: BURNLEY
- Postcode district: BB10
- Dialling code: 01282
- Police: Lancashire
- Fire: Lancashire
- Ambulance: North West
- UK Parliament: Burnley

Harle Syke is a small village within the parish of Briercliffe, situated three miles north of Burnley, Lancashire, England. It was the home to eleven weaving firms, working out of seven mills. Queen Street Mill closed in 1982, and was converted to a textile museum, preserving it as a working mill. It is the world's last 19th-century steam powered weaving mill.

== Location ==
Harle Syke lies at the edge of the Burnley urban area connecting it to the village of Haggate. The main road climbs from the Burnley border to the small crossroads in Haggate, with a road between Nelson and Todmorden. The village dates from the late 19th century, when most of the weaving mills were built.

The origins of the name Harle Syke, first used for a farm nearby, are descriptive; Harle is a person's name, while sike or syke is a local word meaning 'ditch'.

The village itself is relatively flat rising to 800 feet above sea level. To the south is the valley of the River Don or Thursden Brook and to the north is hill of Marsden Height, (270 metres (886 ft)) in Brierfield. The buildings in the village are predominantly stone-built.

All the public houses are open as of 2015, and it has a social club (Briercliffe Social Club). There is a Church of England church.

Harle Syke has direct road links with Burnley and Nelson, and is served by local bus services (4,5) operated by Burnley Bus Company.

== History ==
Briercliffe was named in the Charter of Freewarren granted to Edmund de Lacy the Lord of Blackburnshire in 1251, allowing him to use the area for hunting hares, rabbits and foxes.

In the 18th century, the people of the area worked mostly as farmers and were major producers of wool. There was also a coal mine (which remained open until the middle of the 20th century), that supplied coal to the rapidly growing cotton mills in Burnley. In 1850, a group of men from Haggate founded the first cotton mill in Briercliffe, Harle Syke Mill. They chose a site on farmland next to the road to Burnley, near a natural spring and constructed workers housing close by.

The success of Harle Syke Mill (today known as 'Oxford Mill'), which operated as a 'room and power mill', renting out the space and power from line shafts to manufacturing companies, led to further construction. The new village of Harle Syke expanded steadily until World War I. Harle Syke became the base of many Burnley cotton firms during the time when Lancashire was the cotton capital of the world.

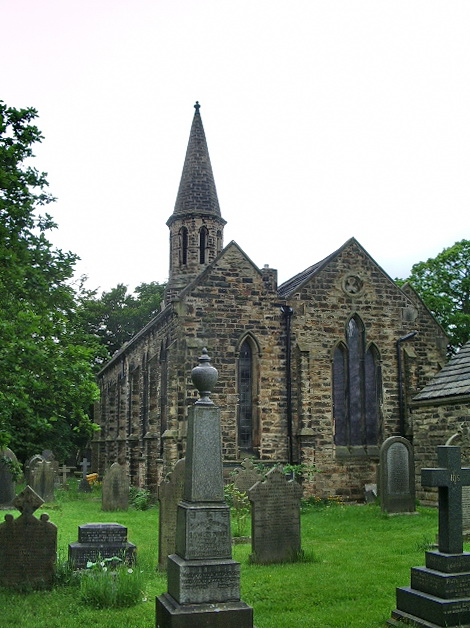
St James Church, Harle Syke

Harle Syke children went to Haggate School, originally a Sunday school for the Baptist Church, which was built on the site of the Haggate cricket pitch in 1882. Most at 12 would become part-timers at one of the mills, or stay on until 13. The school later became the village primary school, and was more recently used by Burnley College.

== The mills ==
In a sense the village was built up around the cotton weaving sheds, or mills as they were also known. The word 'mill' can refer to the building, or to one of the manufacturing companies that rents space in such a mill. For example, Haggate Weaving Company shared the other half of a mill with Altham's of Heasandford Mill, Burnley. There, the buildings and engine were owned by a room and power company called Briercliffe Mill. Because of the availability of room and power, the Harle Syke sheds gave birth to many small companies who grew to build their own reputations and mills in the village, or Burnley and beyond.

The first steam-driven power loom shed in Briercliffe was a 400-loom shed at Lane Bottom set up by William Smith of Hill End in 1848, near his existing hand loom factory, the 1777 Hill Factory. The Extwistle Mill at Extwistle was a small water-powered mill with 100 looms, that eventually converted to steam. In spite of the 1826–1848 crisis, handloom weavers were still having work put out to them from outside the district, but the community was suffering extreme poverty. Smith's Mill, or Lane End Mill, took on both young women and young men, their parents sticking to hand loom weaving. The 200 paid jobs it provided set new expectations of income for teenagers in the district.

'Harle Syke Shed, the next mill to open in 1858, has an interesting history, not so much for the architecture but the means by which it was financed over the 150 years of its existence. The Haggate Joint Stock Commercial Company was a collaborative venture set up under Sir Robert Peel's Joint Stock Companies Act 1844. 64 wage-earning men and women signed the deed of settlement and agreed to take up one £10 share paying a one shilling deposit. Two thirds of them were weavers. Though co-operative in name, the company structure was structured to make profit, and the companies like this that did make it through the downturn of 1857, and the severe recession caused by the Cotton Famine of 1862–63, were more severe employers than the private family businesses. Shares were traded, and dividend paid, and the shareholders often contributed unpaid work to keep the business as well as having unlimited liability for the companies debts. In effect they were running two businesses, protecting the capital assets that were the buildings, boilers and engine, and then manufacturing and trading in cotton cloth. The five elected directors had a great deal of discretion on how and how long the business should operate.

In 1865, the company was reorganised. The Haggate Joint Stock Commercial Company became solely a room and power company. The looms were disposed of to the shareholders, each receiving a pro-rata allocation. In 1865, the property company appears to have achieved steady growth and was expanded in the 1860s and 1880s. The producer partnerships that were formed when the looms were allocated consolidated, and shares in the room and power 'walls' company were traded resulting in a smaller number of shareholders with larger investments. There were seven 'producer partnerships' in 1865. (Note: Roland Kippax, who wrote for the Burnley Express, says that in his youth there were eleven thriving mills in the village, and named them as Harle Syke Mill, James Thornton & Co., Haggate Weaving Co., Althams, Hill End Mfg Co. (Loinbottom), Walshaw Mill Co., Frank Atkinson, James Hargreaves, Herbert Crowther (the last three in Primrose Mill), Mason, West and Bather (King's Mill) and Queen Street Mfg Co.)

Briercliffe Mill was a direct imitation of the reconstituted Harle Syke Mill. It was a pure room and power mill built in 1880 directly opposite it. It was occupied by two firms: Abraham Altham and the Haggate Weaving Company. The Briercliffe Mill Company and the Haggate Weaving Company were both taken over by Taylor & Hartley of Westhoughton, and the company closed in 1960.

The Queen Street Manufacturing Company was a later direct imitation of the Haggate Joint Stock Commercial Company. It took advantage of favourable trading conditions in 1894 to finance itself with 4000 £5.00 shares sold mainly to locals. It built and then extended Queen Street Mill having 1135 Burnley looms. At times it also rented space at the adjoining Primrose Mill, bringing its loomage up to 1500.

There was a lot of activity in 1903–1905. The Haggate Joint Stock Commercial Company went into liquidation on 28 February 1903 with the assets passing to the Harle Syke Mill Company. The Haggate £10 shares were valued at £25, and the 53 shareholders in the old company were paid in shares in the new company. The directors were the same. This was used as an opportunity to expand. (Note: On 6 April 1903, the company approved tender for an engine (£1900), millwright's work (£3235), mason's work (£5890), joiner's work (£1900), plumber's work (£377), slater's work (£1900), plasterer's work (£246), and at a later meeting two Lancashire boilers were bought for £900) A new larger engine was purchased, and a large new weaving shed designed by Joseph Keithley was built. The new company was a property company and a production company. The new shed accommodated 900 looms. (Note: Due to the lack of heating when it opened, it was nicknamed the Siberia Shed and the name is still used.) Additional funding was found by issuing promissory notes at a rate of 4%. A mortgage for £12000 was obtained from the Burnley Building Society.

Walshaw Mill was incorporated 5 January 1905. It was financed with 12000 £1 shares and recapitalised later with an additional 30000. It started with 586 looms which was later increased to nearly 1100.

Alongside Queen Street Mill were two other thousand loom sheds. Primrose Mill was built in 1906 by the West family so was not a joint stock company, and neither was the King's Mill.

Of the mills, Harle Syke Mill, now called Oxford Mill, and Siberia Mill, are rebuilt as industrial units and there are plans for some housing. Briercliffe Mill is in use by various firms including for document storage, and similarly with Walshaw Mill. Kings Mill is now an antiques centre, Queen Street Mill is a textile museum, and Primrose has been demolished after a fire, when it was being used to make beds.

Name	Architect	Location	Built	Demolished	Served (Years)
Briercliffe Mill		53°48′44″N 2°12′13″W			
	Notes: Faces Burnley Road.				
Harle Syke Shed Oxford Mill 1858 Siberia Mill 1903		53°48′44″N 2°12′15″W			
	Notes: The Haggate Joint Stock Commercial Company opened it in 1858 as a production mill, but reorganised it in 1865 to become a 'room and power' company. Seven producer partnerships were formed by the shareholders who had been allocated looms on a pro rata basis. The companies consolidated into four main businesses. Shares in the room and power 'walls' company were traded resulting in a smaller number of shareholders with larger investments. In 1903, the 'walls' liquidated passing assets to the Harle Syke Mill Company which built a new larger shed, jokingly called Siberia Shed after a delay in providing a heating system. The mill engine which is now displayed in the Science Museum, London, was upgraded.				
Hill End Mill					
	Notes: In Lane Bottom				
Kings Mill		SD868349 53°48′36″N 2°12′07″W			
	Notes:				
Oxford Mill		SD8635 53°48′N 2°12′W			
	Notes: Faces Burnley Road.				
Primrose Mill		SD8635 53°48′N 2°12′W			
	Notes: Room and power weaving shed. Now demolished. It was powered by a Pollit & Wigzell horizontal tandem compound steam engine.				
Queen Street Mill		SD868349 53°48′36″N 2°12′07″W	1894	Standing	132
	Notes: The mill was built in 1894. It was powered by a 500hp tandem compound by William Roberts of Nelson. 300 of the original 1138 Harling & Todd and Pemberton Lancashire looms are still in situ and workable. Now a textile museum run by Lancashire Museums (closed to the public from 30 September 2016).				
Siberia Mill		53°48′45″N 2°12′18″W			
	Notes: Now industrial units occupy the weaving shed.				
Walshaw Mill		53°48′37″N 2°12′22″W			
	Notes: This was the second 20th-century mill; it faces Talbot Street. It was incorporated 5 January 1905. It was financed with 12000 £1 shares and recapitalised later with an additional 30000. It started with 586 looms which was subsequently increased. It now is used by a pharmaceutical distribution company.				

== The mill engines ==
Harle Syke is unique in having preserved two of its mill engines. The first is in Queen Street Mill and has never been moved, but the second is preserved in the Science Museum in London, and came from Siberia Mill, it is a cross compound engine, of 700 hp. The Queen Street Mill engine is an 1895 single tandem compound of 500 hp Corliss valves driving a 14 feet (4.3 m) flywheel. The London engine which came from Harle Syke mill is a cross compound with Corliss valves driving an 18-ft, 6-inch flywheel. It was constructed in 1903 by Burnley Ironworks.
