= Queen Street Mill =

Building in Harle Syke, to the north-east of Burnley, Lancashire

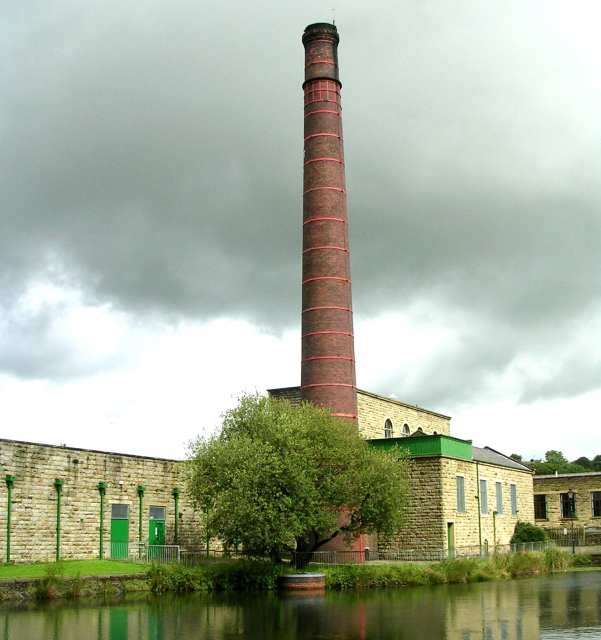
- Queen Street Mill

- Location within the Borough of Burnley

Weaving mill
- Current status: Closed 12 Mar 1982
- Architectural style: Single storey
- Location: Harle Syke, Burnley, Lancashire, England
- Owner: Queen Street Manufacturing Company
- Further ownership: Burnley Borough Council (1982)
- Current owners: Lancashire Museums
- Coordinates: 53.81°N 2.20°W

Construction
- Built: 1894
- Completed: 1895
- Floor count: 1

Design team
- Awards and prizes and listings: A Grade I listed building.No. 1416482(2013-12-25)

Power
- Date: 1894
- Engine maker: William Roberts of Nelson
- Engine type: Tandem compound
- Valve Gear: Corliss valves operated by Dobson trip gear
- rpm: 68
- Installed horse power (ihp): 500
- Transmission type: Direct drive to line shafts

Boiler configuration
- Boilers: Twin Lancashire boilers, coal fired
- Pressure: 140

Equipment
- Date: 1894
- Manufacturer: Pemberton; Harling & Todd
- No. of looms: 990 (now 308)

Queen Street Mill is a former weaving mill in Harle Syke, a suburb to the north-east of Burnley, Lancashire, that is a Grade I listed building. It now operates as a museum and cafe. Currently open for public tours between April and November. Over winter the café is opened on Wednesdays. It is also viewable with private bookings.

It was built in 1894 for the Queen Street Manufacturing Company. It closed on 12 March 1982 and was mothballed, but was subsequently taken over by Burnley Borough Council and maintained as a museum. In the 1990s ownership passed to Lancashire Museums. Unique in being the world's only surviving operational steam-driven weaving shed, it received an Engineering Heritage Award in November 2010.

Previously open to visitors and offering weaving demonstrations, the museum closed in September 2016 (except for pre-booked school parties). In April 2018 Lancashire County Council announced that the museum, along with Helmshore Mills Textile Museum and the Judges Lodgings in Lancaster, would reopen three days a week.

== Location ==
Queen Street Mill is a former working mill that lies within Harle Syke. It is a suburb of Burnley, an industrial town in the North West of the United Kingdom. Harle Syke is approximately 4 km from Burnley town centre and a part of the civil parish of Briercliffe with Extwistle. It is 22 miles (35 km) north of Manchester and 26 miles (42 km) east of Preston, two other former large industrial towns that were significant during the Industrial Revolution. Harle Syke is on high ground to the south of the River Calder near the M65. The hamlet was built on grid-iron layout and housed seven cotton mills, or weaving sheds.

== History ==
The Queen Street Mill Manufacturing Company was established in 1894, capitalised with £20,000 in £5 shares. The first board of directors was listed as Brierley Edmondson (weaver), William Kippax (weaver), George Lane (builder), John Nuttall (glazer), Thomas Pickles (foreman), John Taylor (weaver), Whitaker Whitaker (weaver), and James Corrin (Headteacher, Haggate School) who became the first company secretary. The company built the Queen Street Mill between 1894 and 1895. As money was scarce only one Lancashire boiler was installed, and it was six years before the second was bought. The weaving shed was single storey, and the mill frontage was three storey. All the looms were bought from Burnley companies, Pemberton & Co. and Harling & Todd Ltd., and have not been replaced. The mill was originally equipped with 900 single shuttle Lancashire looms capable of producing grey cloth. When this was not enough, the company installed a further 366 looms at Primrose Mill, Harle Syke which was the room and power mill immediately adjacent but slightly downhill. To the workers it was known as the bottom shed.

The completed cloth was taken by horse and cart and train to finishers for bleaching and dyeing. Around 1910, the hauliers, ex-employees of the mill invested in two steam driven flat bed lorries. These were impounded in 1915 for war work, and horses briefly returned. In April 1913 quotes were sought from William Roberts & Co of Nelson to upgrade the engine, which mainly included replacing the slide-valve cylinders with more efficient Corliss valve cylinders. This work was carried out during the following Wakes Week.

The financial structure of the company inhibited change, and the original equipment was not improved again or replaced but the company continued to weave when other firms had closed. Mains electricity was only introduced in 1947.

In November 2015 Lancashire County Council announced it planned to cease its funding of the museum and shut to the public from 1 April 2016. In March 2016 the museum was granted a six-month reprieve and remained open to the public until 30 September 2016 under the council. In April 2018 it was announced it would reopen Fridays, Saturdays and Sundays from July 7 until 28 October 2018 and between Easter and the end of October 2019.

=== Harle Syke Strike, 1915 ===
Weavers were paid by piecework; a good four-loom weaver was paid 24 shillings a week, only slightly less than the tackler. Harle Syke workers had always been paid slightly below the list, which management explained as being due to the carriage costs to Burnley. In August 1915 there was a strike that lasted for several weeks triggered by this injustice. Many workers were also shareholders and took a dividend from the profits of the mill, so they refused to join the strike. Leaflets were printed by the Weavers' Union accusing them of scabbing and being "Knobsticks". The issue was resolved in December 1915 when the War Bonus came into effect and weavers were persuaded to see this as the rise they had been seeking. Cotton Control was introduced in 1918, which led to a four-day working week.

=== Fire, 1918 ===
A serious fire occurred in October 1918. The fire did not affect the boilers or the engine, and the mill was fully operational again 10 days after the incident. However, the mill front was damaged, and was subsequently rebuilt, though as a single-storey building. During the rebuilding, the mill looms were relocated to the bottom shed. As forementioned, Prudence the engine, was undamaged in the fire and was renamed Peace, in respect for the fallen soldiers of the First World War.

=== Museum, 1983 ===
By early 1982 the mill was only operating 440 looms and was no longer financially viable. It finally closed on 12 March 1982, and the mill was mothballed. The mill was rescued by Burnley Borough Council in 1983. It was reopened in April 1986 as a working textile museum. It passed to Lancashire County Council's Museums Service who carried out major refurbishments assisted by English Heritage, the National Heritage Memorial Fund and the European Regional Development Fund. It re-opened again in 1997. The mill again produced cloth as a result of the demonstrations, and the machinery is deemed a collection of national importance.

==== Exhibits ====
In addition to the original machines, Lancashire Museums also display other textile machines they own or are restoring, and weave some specialist commissions. One of the commissions is a blue and white shirting that is sold exclusively to 'Old Town' of Holt, Norfolk, who produce Victorian workware. Another is weaving woollen Jewish prayer shawls. There is a large Hattersley Standard Loom, and a treadle operated Hattersley Domestic Loom. There is a Sulzer, and a Saurer telescopic rapier loom that operates at 180 picks per minute. There is a collection of shuttles and machines used to make and maintain them. Also, there are machines for making reeds and healds.

==== Closure ====
In November 2015 the Labour-controlled Lancashire County Council announced the withdrawal of funding from five of its museums: Fleetwood Museum, Helmshore Mills Textile Museum, Judges' Lodgings, Museum of Lancashire and Queen Street Mill because of what the leader of the council described as "the financial challenges facing the county council as we deal with relentless cuts to central government funding combined with rising demand for our services". They were initially to close at the end of March 2016 but that month were reprieved until September 2016.

The museum closed on 30 September 2016, along with the other four Lancashire museums mentioned above, except for pre-booked school groups. In October 2016 Lancashire County Council's website stated that "There has been an expression of interest from a potential new operator"; as of 3 June 2017 it stated that "Negotiations are underway to identify a new operator". In April 2018 it was announced it would reopen on Fridays, Saturdays and Sundays from July 7 until 28 October 2018 and between Easter and the end of October 2019.

=== Architecture ===
The mill was of four-storey construction, with a large single-storey weaving shed. After the fire in 1918 it was remodelled into a single-storey building, space being taken from the weaving sheds for a new preparation area. On closure in 1982 it was reconfigured by Burnley Council, the weaving shed was partitioned, about a third being used for rentable industrial units, and a similar area being used for visitor facilities. The 37-metre (121 ft) chimney and the 60 m x 25 m lodge lay to the south. The boiler house, the engine house and chimney were previously scheduled monuments. The whole site was granted Grade I listed status in 2013 giving protection to the rest of the building.

As originally built the weaving shed was about 170 metres (560 ft) by 160 metres (520 ft), with the typical north facing roof lights (windows) giving natural light, the shed housed 990 looms. On the Queen Street side was the boiler room and engine house, and the four-storey warehouse. The ground floor was the weft department, the first floor was offices, the cloth warehouse and temporary storage beams, the second floor was the winding and beaming department for beaming and drawing in, and the third floor was the preparation department for tape sizing. After the fire the ground floor of the frontage was rebuilt and used for winding and preparation, 100 looms were removed, and part of the Harrison Street end of the shed became the new warehouse. Rowland Kippax who worked there however reported "there were now 1040 looms, there were nine tacklers looking after 130 looms each".

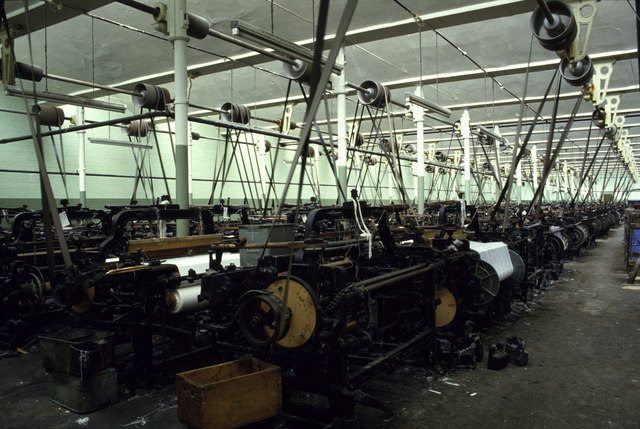

=== Power ===
Steam is raised by two Lancashire boilers built by Tinker, Shenton & Co, Hyde. The first was installed in 1895, and the second in 1901, when a 120-tube Greens Economiser was fitted. Feed water is now supplied by a Weir pump fitted in 1956. Both boilers were stoked manually, until secondhand Proctor automatic stokers were fitted in 1962. Boiler No.1 had the Shovel type and the coking type was fitted to No.2; the manually stoked 1901 boiler is the only one used today. Coal was obtained locally from Bank Hall Pit but now with pollution controls being stricter it has to be imported. At its peak it burnt 6 tonnes a day, but now uses only 10 tonnes a month. The steam raised to 100 psi in the boiler house, drives the original tandem compound horizontal stationary steam engine. The high-pressure cylinder (HP) is 16 inches (41 cm) and the low-pressure (LP) 32 inches (81 cm). It uses Corliss valves. The engine drives a 14 feet (4.3 m) flywheel running at 68 rpm. The 500 horsepower (370 kW) engine was built and installed by William Roberts of Nelson in 1895. It has never been moved from this location and runs perfectly true. Power is taken from the crankshaft by a series of directly driven line shafts. Currently the mill uses coal bought from the United States and Russia.

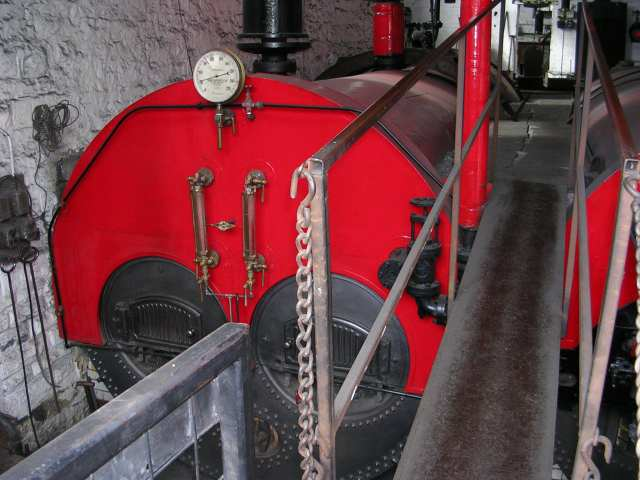
Lancashire Boiler

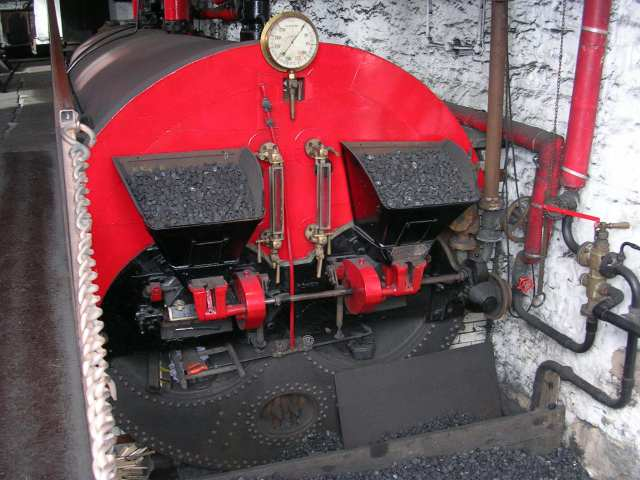
Lancashire Boiler with feeders

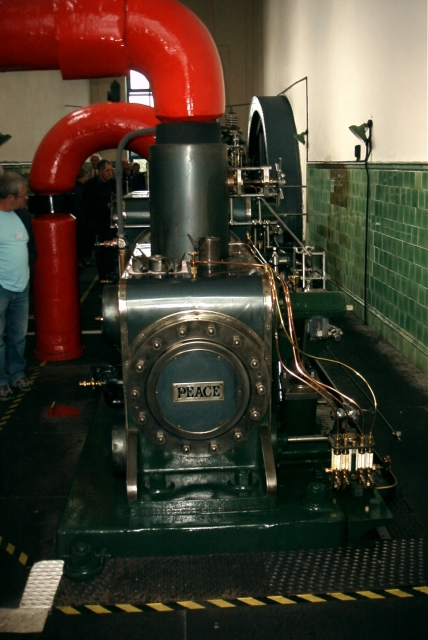
Peace, a tandem compound

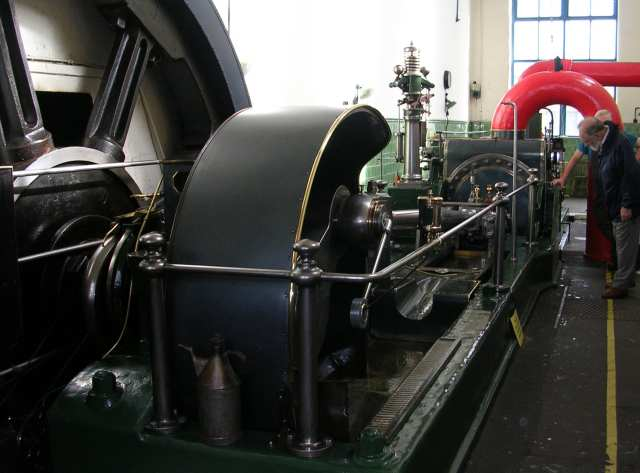
Looking towards the flywheel.

Peace starting up

=== Equipment ===
The mill is particularly notable for its completeness. When yarn enters a weaving mill, it is on different size cops and cheeses, and these had to be wound onto pirns to fit in the shuttles used by the looms installed. The equipment is here and used. For the weft, there are two remaining banks of pirn winders manned by one operative.

The warp needs to be taken from a 300 bobbins on V-shaped frame and wound onto a beam. Four or five beams are merged to make the 2000 end beam that is needed, and they are placed in the Cylinder Tape Sizing Machine (made in 1919 by Howard & Bullough Ltd. of Accrington). The threads pass through the size to stiffen them and reduce friction. The size is a mixture of flour soft soap and tallow: specific to this mill. They are dried over steam-heated cylinders and wound onto the final beam, the weavers beam.

The weavers beam is now placed on the Drawing-in frame. Here each end is passed through the healds, and then through a reed. This job was done by a reacher-in and a loomer. The reacher-in, who would be young and usually a boy, passed each end in order to the loomer. The mill still has two Drawing in frames. Alternatively, if the loom had already run that cloth, a short length of warp thread could be left on the healds and reed, and a Barber-Colman knotter could tie in warp threads to the new beam. This process took 20 minutes, considerably faster than starting afresh. Spare healds and reeds are stored above head height for that purpose.

The loomed weavers beam would be taken into the weaving shed. One weaver would tenter 6, or 8 Lancashire Looms, which would be kept working by a tackler. Today there are 308 looms from 1894 built by Pemberton, or Harling & Todd of Burnley. These would require 65–80 weavers and 3 tacklers. At its peak there were 990 looms, all driven by overhead line shafts.

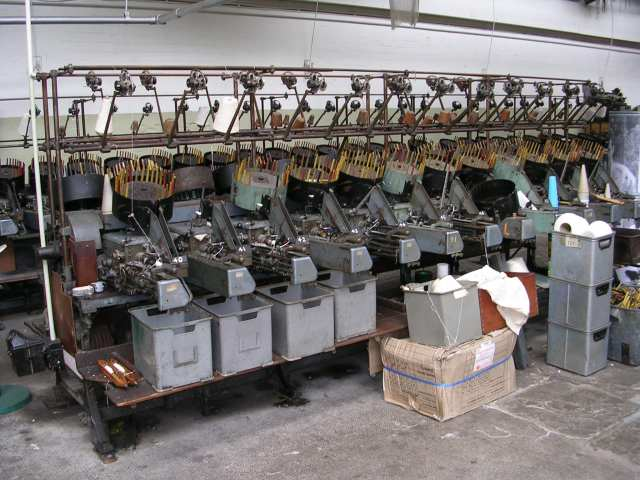
Pirning

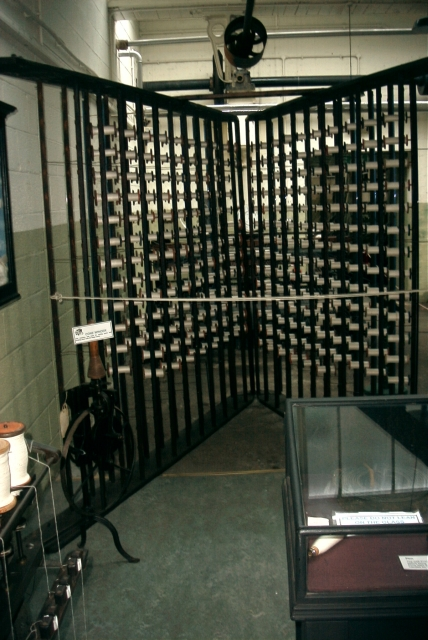
Bobbins for Beaming frame

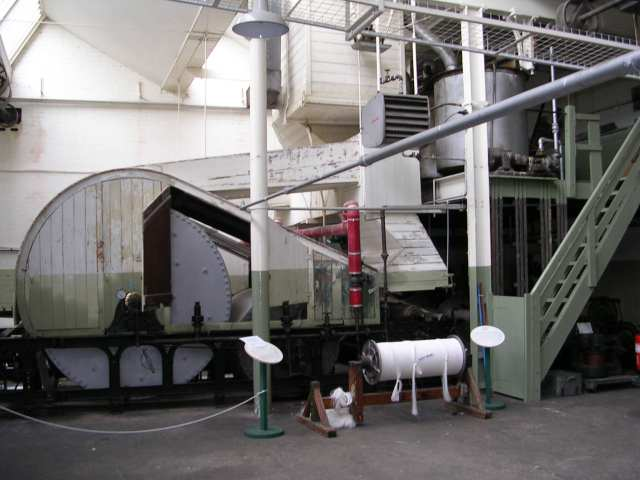
Cylinder Sizer

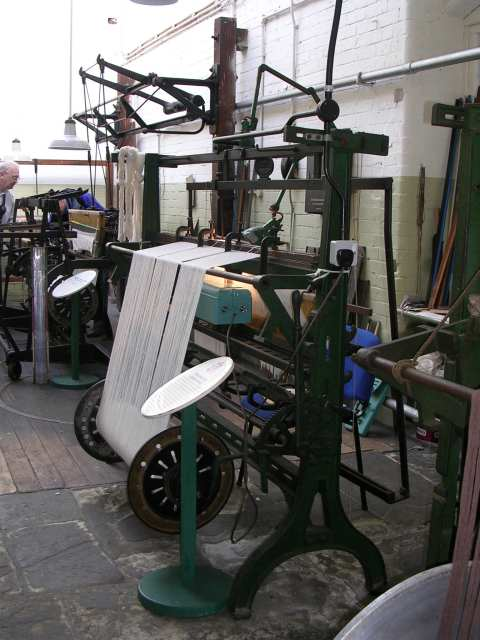
Drawing-in frame

In the weaving shed

== Notable events/media ==
The weaving shed was used in a scene in the 2010 film The King's Speech. The museum was also used to portray the Milton steam mill in the BBC series North & South, featured in Life on Mars and appeared in the 2015 BBC adaption of An Inspector Calls.

Queen Street has also featured in a variety of documentaries including Channel 4's 2014 series Hidden Villages presented by Penelope Keith.

The mill was also featured with Prunella Scales and Timothy West in an episode of Great Canal Journeys S4E3.

== See also ==
- Grade I listed buildings in Lancashire
- Listed buildings in Briercliffe
- Bancroft Shed
- Helmshore Mills Textile Museum
- Textile manufacturing
