= Listed buildings in Briercliffe =

Briercliffe is a civil parish in the borough of Burnley, Lancashire, England. The parish contains 21 buildings that are recorded in the National Heritage List for England as designated listed buildings. Of these, one is listed at Grade I, the highest of the three grades, two at Grade II*, the middle grade, and the others are at Grade II, the lowest grade.

Until the 19th century, the parish was rural, and most of the older listed buildings originated as farmhouses or farm buildings. The other listed buildings from this period include a medieval cross base, a country house that is now in ruins, and a packhorse bridge. The cotton industry arrived in the parish in the middle of the 19th century, and its western part became a suburb of Burnley. The listed buildings from the later period are a parish church, and two cotton weaving mills.

== Key ==
Grade	Criteria
I	Buildings of exceptional interest, sometimes considered to be internationally important
II*	Particularly important buildings of more than special interest
II	Buildings of national importance and special interest

== Buildings ==
Name and location	Photograph	Date	Notes	Grade
Nogworth Cross; 53.80299°N 2.17844°W		Late medieval (possibly)	The base of the cross is in sandstone and consists of a sightly tapering block about 0.5 metres (1.6 ft) square. It has a recess on the top for a cross shaft.	II
Extwistle Hall; 53.80039°N 2.18963°W		16th century	A ruinous country house consisting of part of a hall and cross-wings on three sides of a courtyard. It is in sandstone with some stone-slate roofs, gable coping, and ball finials. The hall has three storeys, there is a stair wing of four storeys, and elsewhere the building is in two storeys. Windows are mullioned or mullioned and transomed, and internally some decorated plasterwork remains. The attached garden wall is included in the listing.	II*
Ingham House and barn 53.80943°N 2.17845°W		16th century	The barn is the oldest part of structure, the attached house dating from the 18th century. They are in sandstone with stone-slate roofs. The barn has three bays and contains a wagon entrance. Inside there is a complete post-and-truss timber frame. The house has two storeys and two bays, with a lean-to porch on the front and a full-height lean-to extension at the rear.	II
Foulds House; 53.82022°N 2.16897°W		Early 17th century (probable)	Formerly a farmhouse, the house is in sandstone with stone-slate roofs. It is in two storeys and has a T-shaped plan, the main block being in two bays with a large single-bay wing to the rear. Most of the windows are mullioned. On the gabled left end is a two-storey porch with a square-headed doorway above which is a round-headed window with imposts.	II
Netherwood Cottage and Farmhouse; 53.79877°N 2.20988°W		Early 17th century (possible)	The building was altered in the 18th century. It is in sandstone with a stone-slate roof, and has two storeys and an elongated T-shaped plan. The cottage is at the right, and it projects to the front and the rear; the house has three bays. Most of the windows are mullioned.	II
Burwains; 53.81856°N 2.17282°W		1642	Originally a farmhouse and attached cottage, later converted into a single dwelling. It is in sandstone with a stone-slate roof, and has two storeys and a three-bay front. There is a two-storey porch with a triangular headed doorway and a datestone above it. Most of the windows are mullioned.	II*
Holden Farmhouse; 53.80072°N 2.17564°W	—	Mid 17th century	A sandstone farmhouse with two storeys. It has an L-shaped plan with an outshut at the rear, and a two-bay front with a single-storey porch at the right end. The windows are mullioned.	II
Barn, Holden Farm; 53.80101°N 2.17601°W	—	17th century (probable)	The barn is in sandstone with stone-slate roofs. It has a front of five bays, with outshuts at the front and the rear. The barn contains wagon entrances and doorways.	II
Packhorse bridge 53.82284°N 2.17598°W		17th century (possible)	The former packhorse bridge carries pedestrians over Catlow Brook. It is in sandstone, and has a small semicircular arch with voussoirs, and a battlemented parapet.	II
Doorway of New House; 53.81626°N 2.14045°W		1672	The isolated doorway of the former New House Farmhouse. It consists of a sandstone archway with a triangular head. The date is part of the inscription on the lintel, above which is a datestone, also inscribed and probably moved from elsewhere, containing the date 1612.	II
Croft House; 53.80912°N 2.19122°W	—	Late 17th century (probable)	Originally a farmhouse, the house is in sandstone, partly rendered, and has a stone-slate roof. It has two storeys and two bays, which are unequal in size, and a gable end facing the road. On the front is a single-storey gabled porch. Most of the windows are mullioned.	II
Monk Hall; 53.80556°N 2.16862°W		Late 17th century	A former farmhouse, it is in sandstone with a slate roof. The house has two storeys and two bays, a small outshut in the first bay giving it an L-shaped plan. Most of the windows are mullioned.	II
Higher House and Cottage; 53.81767°N 2.19870°W	—	1725	A house and attached cottage in sandstone, both with two storeys; the house has a tiled roof and the cottage is roofed in stone-slate. The house has a T-shaped plan, with a symmetrical two-bay front having a central protruding two-storey porch. The doorway has a segmental head, and above it is a datestone. The cottage is in one bay, and its doorway was moved here from Extwistle Hall in the 20th century. The windows are mullioned.	II
Tattersall Barn Farmhouse and barn 53.81038°N 2.20488°W	—	Mid 18th century (probable)	The former farmhouse and attached barn have been converted into a house. It is in sandstone with a stone-slate roof, and has two storeys, a rectangular plan, with two bays from the former farmhouse and three from the barn. The windows are mullioned, some of which were inserted later.	II
Hill End House; 53.81567°N 2.19274°W	—	Late 18th century	A sandstone house with a stone-slate roof, it has two storeys and a symmetrical three-bay front, In the centre is a doorway with a moulded architrave, a cornice, and a rectangular fanlight. Some of the windows are mullioned, and others are sashes.	II
Lower Fenny Moor Foot; 53.82313°N 2.19239°W	—	Late 18th century	A house with integral back-to-back cottages, later converted into two dwellings, it is in sandstone with a stone-slate roof. The building has a square, two-bay plan, and is in 2 1/2 storeys. There are two doorways on the front, and some of the windows are mullioned.	II
Broad Bank House; 53.81125°N 2.14699°W	—	1777	A sandstone house with a stone-slate roof, it has two storeys and an attic, and a symmetrical two-bay front. There is a central doorway with an architrave and pediment. Many of the windows have been altered, but there are mullioned windows and a blocked Venetian window on the left side, and a Venetian stair window on the right side.	II
Higher Saxifield Farmhouse; 53.81251°N 2.21161°W		Early 19th century (probable)	A former combined farmhouse and barn, it is in sandstone with a slate roof to the house and stone-slate to the barn. It has a rectangular plan, with a front of five bays, and the house has two storeys. The house has a plain doorway with a cornice, and the barn has a wagon entrance with inserted windows and a door.	II
St James' Church; 53.81065°N 2.20286°W		1839–41	The church, designed by Edmund Sharpe in Early English style, is in sandstone with stone-slate roofs. It consists of a nave and a short chancel with, at the west end, a two-stage tower, on which is an octagonal drum and a short octagonal spire. The windows are lancets. Inside the church are galleries on three sides.	II
Queen Street Mill; 53.81030°N 2.20203°W		1894–95	A cotton weaving mill that closed in 1985, since when it has been converted into a working museum. The mill continues to work with its original steam engine. It occupies a complex containing a preparation block, a weaving shed, an engine house, a boiler house and a chimney. There is a separate mill lodge or reservoir, and a former stable block. The working machinery includes a steam engine, a boiler, an economiser, line and cross shafts, and looms.	I
King's Mill; 53.81043°N 2.20074°W		1912	A former cotton weaving mill, later used by small businesses. It is in sandstone and brick, and has roofs of slate and glass. The mill has a large rectangular plan and is in a single storey. It contains a weaving shed, offices, a loading bay, a warehouse and a power block, and has a brick chimney about 21 metres (69 ft) high.	II
