= Textile sizing machine =

Textile finishing machine

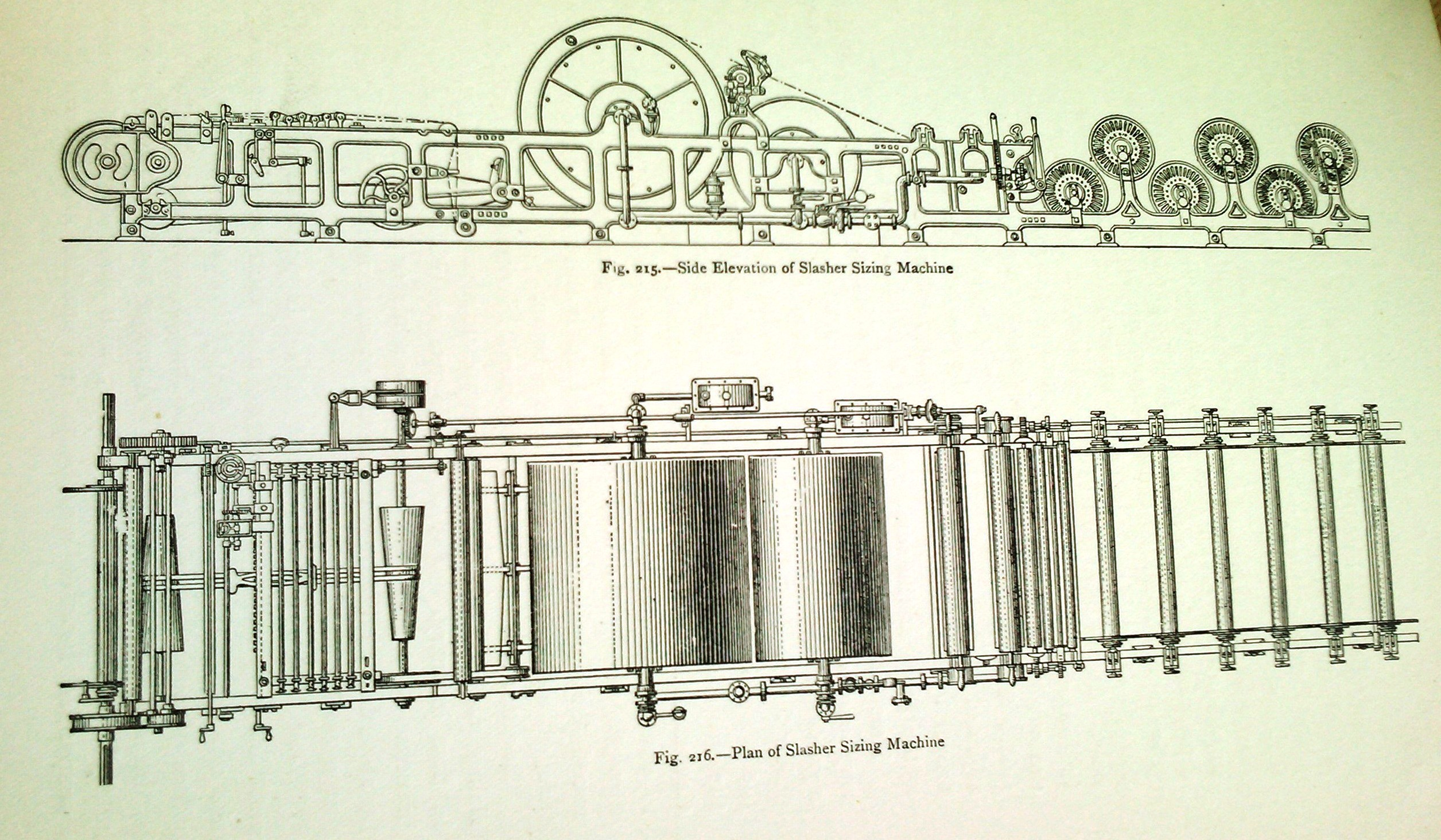
Diagram of a sizing machine

The technique of sizing a warp was mechanised during the nineteenth century when William Radcliffe and his assistant Thomas Johnson invented the sizing machine. The purpose of introducing size, which is either a starchy substance for cotton or gelatinous mixture for woollen fibre, is to reduce the chances of threads fraying and breaking due to the friction of the weaving process. The size stiffens the thread and helps the fibres lie closely together. Many recipes for size can be found in textile manufacturing books. The recipes include flour, sago, china clay, types of soap, fats and some chemicals.

Before mechanisation, the sizing process was a time-consuming task. The weaver painted the size onto the warp as it lay on the loom, then fanned it dry before weaving the cloth. The sizing machine improved the process by sizing a warp before putting it into the loom. The warp threads are first wound onto a large beam, which is then placed at one end of the sizing machine. Then the warp is drawn off the beam and passes through a bath of boiling size, between sets of rollers and cooled, dried and rewound onto another beam. It is then ready to be woven.

An example of a sizing machine made in 1919 by Howard and Bullough Ltd, Accrington, Lancashire, England, can be seen in the tape size room of Queen Street Mill Textile Museum, Burnley in Lancashire. Other early twentieth century sizing machine manufacturers were Brook and Crowther, T., Ltd of Huddersfield, Butterworth and Dickinson Ltd, Burnley and Platt Bros & Co. Ltd.
