= Weavers' cottage =

Housing for cloth weavers

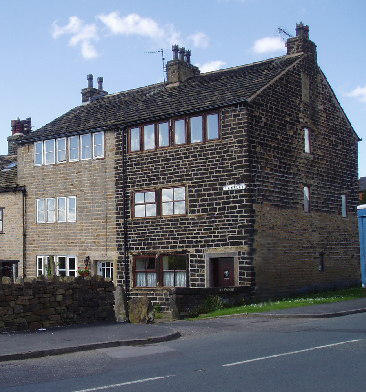
Former woollen weavers' cottages in Wardle, Greater Manchester, England.

A weavers' cottage was (and to an extent still is) a type of house used by weavers for cloth production in the putting-out system sometimes known as the domestic system.

Weavers' cottages were common in Great Britain, often with dwelling quarters on the lower floors and loom-shop on the top floor. Cellar loomshops on the ground floor or in the basement were found where cotton was woven, as they provided high humidity. A loom-shop can be often recognised by a long row of windows which provided maximum light for the weaver.

== Cottage industry ==
Medieval period peasants' cottages have rarely survived, while the prestigious dwellings of merchants and traders are still in evidence. The urban poor manufactured items in the living area of their cottages. The rural poor, bound to the land owner, worked in one of their master's buildings. With the rise of a non-agrarian society, subsistence level domestic manufacture became common, and the introduction of machinery required either the living room to be enlarged and modified or the addition of a separate room. Requirements were similar for any domestic manufacturing craft industry.

In a rural home the living room was enlarged so the weaver could benefit from heat from the single hearth. To provide enough light to operate a loom, a long window of up to ten lights occupied one wall. Alternatively, an extra storey was added so that manufacture was separated from family life. The loom shop was marked by the long multi-light mullioned window that became common in urban settings. Three-storey terraced cottages are now referred to as Weavers' cottages.

Most extant cottages in the north-west date from the late-18th and early-19th century when weaving had ceased to be a sideline. They were adapted or built specially at a time when spinning technology was sufficiently advanced to supply the needs of the weavers. Wool and silk manufacture were slower to adopt power driven looms than the cotton industry. Terraces of three-storey brick-built domestic workshops were built in Macclesfield after silk weaving was introduced around 1790 and more than 600 weavers had looms in their homes in 1825. Domestic workshops for velvet cutting survived in the Cadishead area until 1914.

== Loomshop ==
A terrace of three storey silk weavers cottages

To be an efficient manufacturing facility, a loomshop needed good daylight, controlled ventilation, un-obstructed space, provision for storage, heat, and access for goods and workers. Hand looms were manual, the artisan raised the heddles using foot levers, and threw the shuttle the width of the loom by hand, forward and back. The left hand was used to operate the batten that compressed the pick. Broader cloth could not be woven this way, so the weaver used a child to throw back the shuttle. John Kay's flying shuttle of 1733, removed the need for the child. The weaver jerked the two hammers or pickers with a picking stick held in the right hand. The pickers propelled the shuttle, and the left hand operated the batten.

A loom shop would either be built as an attached shed entered from outside or as a garret above the house entered through a trap-door from below or by external stairs to minimize disruption when a new beam was brought in. Animal fibres (wool, silk) did not need sizing so considerations of humidity were unimportant. It was usual for a loomshop to contain three or four looms which were worked by members of the family. In the house below was a kitchen and scullery and living room on the ground floor and two bedrooms on the first, a typical two-up-two-down cottage. Sometimes a row of cottages would have a common loom-shop above, allowing several looms to be worked.

It was believed that artisan weavers wove cloth during poor weather and worked on their land when possible. It is more likely that some weavers worked full-time at the loom, breaking off to help their neighbours during the harvest. Some smallholders were weavers to supplement their main income. Full-time weavers tended to cluster in rows of cottages forming a hamlet while the smallholders cottage was likely to be solitary.

The man of the house was the most productive and worked full-time, his wife shared her time between the loom and childcare. Unmarried children were employed and trained on the job.

== Lancashire cellar loomshops ==
A cottage with an attached loomshop after buildings in Fecitt Brow, Blackburn

Two terraced cottages, built on top of cellar loomshops. After buildings in found in the weavers' colony at Club Houses, Church Street, Horwich, Greater Manchester.

By the end of the 17th century three localised areas of textile production could be identified in Lancashire. Linen was woven in the west of the county and in Manchester while in upland Pennine regions, woollens were woven and in central Lancashire the emphasis was on fustians, cloth made with a linen warp and wool weft. In central Lancashire weavers subsequently switched to calico, cloth with a cotton warp and a cotton weft. In the 1790s, the demand for calico expanded and more towns switched to cotton weaving producing cloth for the emerging printing industry.

Weaving cotton requires humid conditions and cotton needed to be sized, strands of warp thread were coated with a layer of paste to prevent chafing against the healds and reeds in the batten. If the size hardened it broke the thread. Loomshops were built in the basement or on the ground floor. The weavers kept the floor beneath the loom moist, sometimes by digging channels into the clay floor and pouring in water. The loomshop was entered through the family accommodation so humidity was not lost to the outside. In such a cottage, one ground floor room became the manufactory, and the family lived in the other, a kitchen living room. Sometimes a basement was excavated beneath the family home lit by elongated windows. The term 'cellar loomshop' was used for both ground floor and basement establishments. (Note: In the 19th century cellar had a broader meaning than today, and did not just mean basement. cf wine-cellar)

In the peak years of handloom weaving around 1820, there were 170,000 handloom weavers in Lancashire. The 1851 census recorded 55,000 hand loom weavers in the county while the 1861 census records 30,000 and the 1871 census 10,000. By 1891, few were left. The figures give some indication of number of weavers cottages that existed. It is probable that there would be four looms in each shop. (Note: Timmins cautions against relying on the census data as the accuracy of the enumerators was variable; some failed to differentiate between the power loom weaver and the hand weaver.)

== Legacy ==
At the time of rapid urbanization, rows of terraced houses were constructed to accommodate the new urban workers. In East Anglia detached cottages were built from timber and cob, while woolen weaving communities favoured three-storey two-up two-down with a loom shop above.

The loomshop design was adequate until power was needed and in a sense the early weaving sheds were extended loom shops.

== In art ==
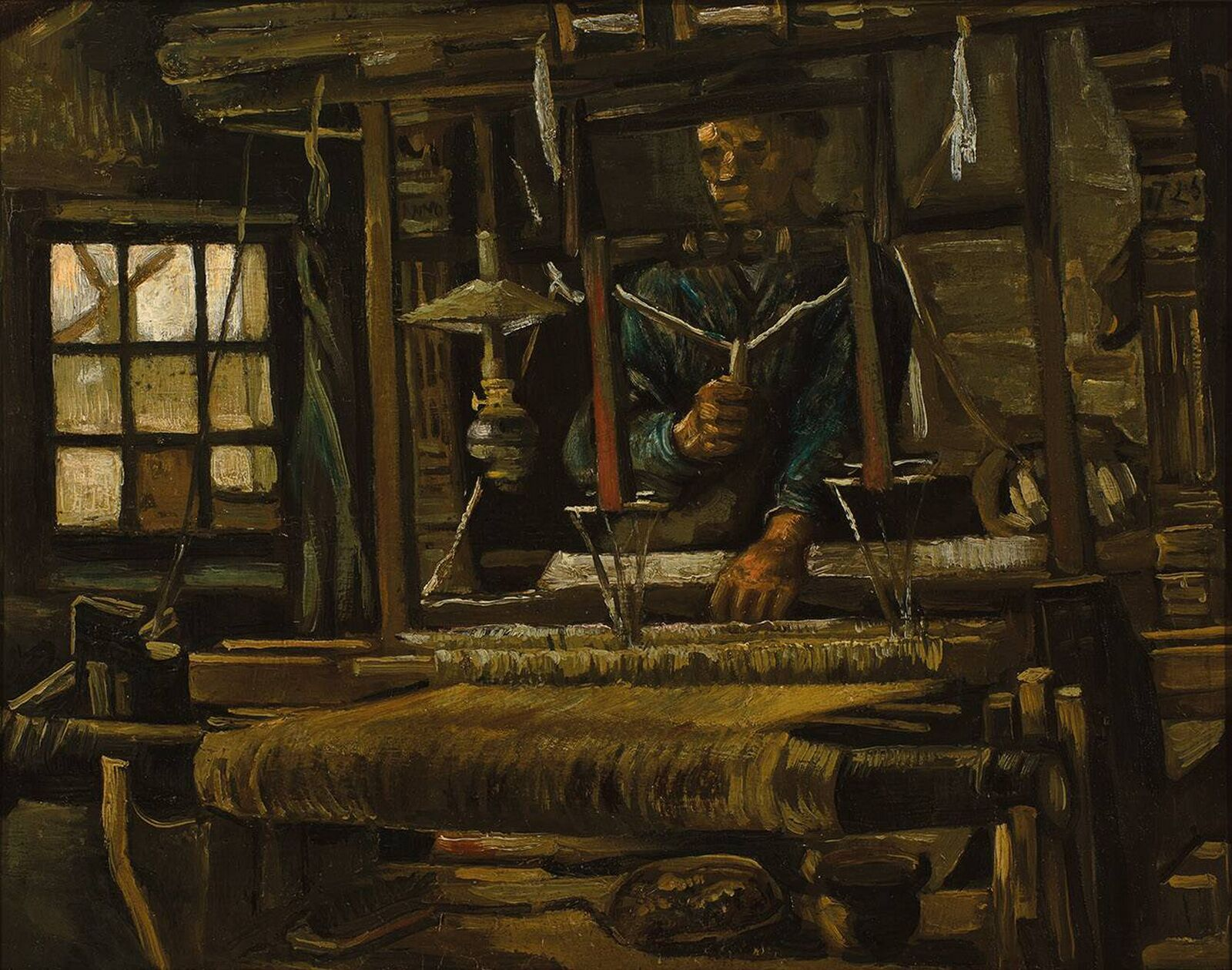
A weavers cottage, as seen by Vincent van Gogh, Nuenen 1884

In 1884, Vincent van Gogh made a series of drawings and paintings of rural artisan weavers and the loomshops in their cottages. Van Gogh was interested in the "meditative appearance" of the weavers. "A weaver who has to direct and to interweave a great many little threads has no time to philosophize about it, but rather he is so absorbed in his work that he doesn't think but acts, and he feels how things must go more than he can explain it." he wrote in 1883.

By then rural weaving was not a prosperous trade; income varied dramatically depending upon crop yields for material and market conditions. Weavers were living a poor life, especially in comparison to urban centers of textile manufacturing nearby such as Leiden. The rural artisan's livelihood had become increasingly precarious.

Van Gogh wrote to his brother Theo, "Their life is hard. A weaver who stays hard at work makes a piece of about 60 yards a week. While he weaves, his wife has to sit before him, winding – in other words, winding the spools of yarn – so there are two of them who work and have to make a living from it."

== See also ==
- Bleachfield
- Hearth Tax
- Harle Syke Mill
- Timeline of clothing and textiles technology
