= Tinker, Shenton & Co =

English firm of boilermakers

Tinker, Shenton and Company
- Industry: Boilermaking
- Founded: 1872
- Defunct: 1928
- Headquarters: Hyde, Cheshire, England

Tinker, Shenton and Company, based at Hyde Boiler Works, Hyde, Cheshire (now in Tameside), England, were a firm of boilermakers, founded in 1872. The firm was at that date incorporated as a Limited Company by James Shenton, Richard Shenton and George James Tinker.

Initially based at a workshop on John Street, Hyde, the firm soon moved to Hyde Boiler Works on Furnace Street in the Flowery Field area, from where they operated until the closure of the firm in 1928.

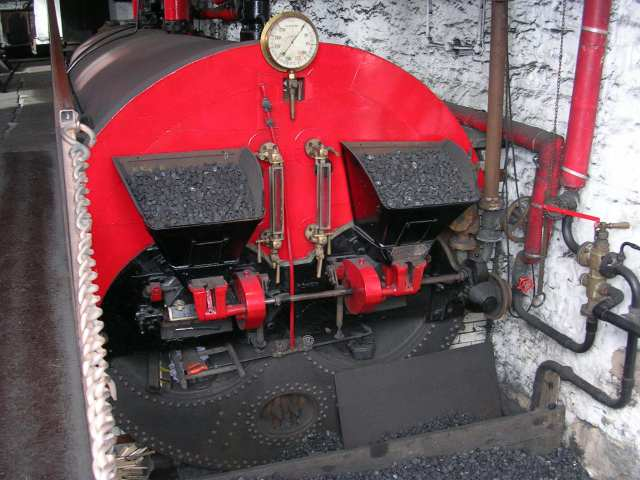
One of the pair of Tinker, Shenton & Co boilers at Queen Street Mill

Tinker, Shenton and Company manufactured Lancashire and Cornish steam boilers. Well-preserved examples of their Lancashire boilers exist at both the Ellesmere Port Boat Museum and the Queen Street Mill Textile Museum in Burnley, Lancashire, which has a pair.
