= Barber–Colman Company =

The Barber–Colman Company was a manufacturer of textile and milling machinery from its founding in 1894 until the 1980s. Howard Colman organized the company in Rockford, Illinois, with capital from W. A. Barber. Early successes with their Hand Knotter and Warp Tying Machine allowed the company to expand internationally, manufacturing goods in five states and three countries. The company moved to Loves Park, Illinois, in the 1950s, but struggled following the death of Walter Colman in 1983. Eurotherm Controls, Inc. currently holds the rights to the company name.

== History ==
- Barber–Colman Company Historic District
- U.S. National Register of Historic Places
- U.S. Historic district
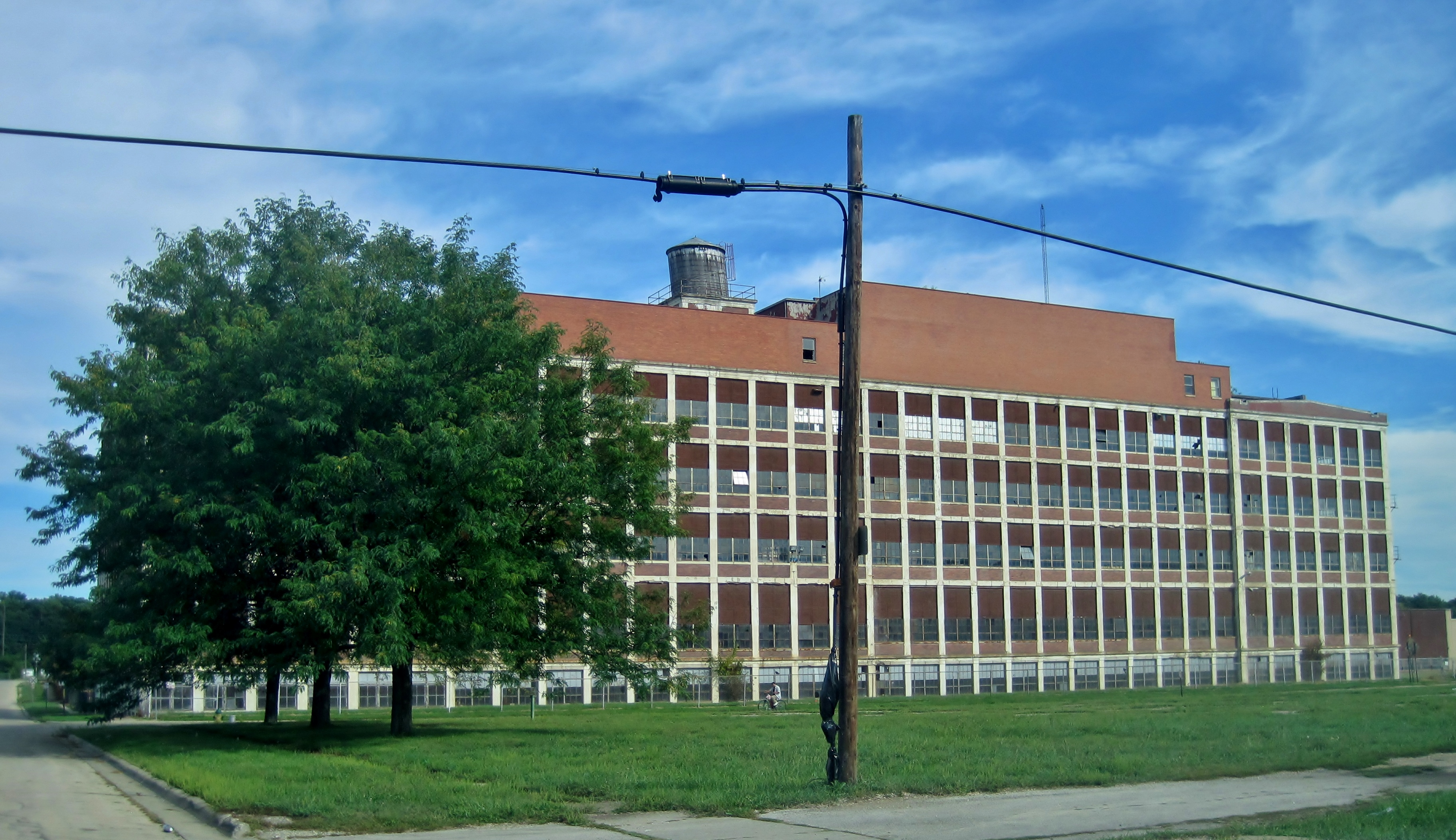
- Section 5 of the complex

- Location within Illinois Location within the United States
- Location: 100 Loomis, 1202-1322 (even) Rock St., Rockford, Illinois
- Area: 12.8 acres (5.2 ha)
- Architectural style: Industrial Loft
- NRHP reference No.: 06000674
- Added to NRHP: August 8, 2006

Howard Colman came to Rockford, Illinois, from Wisconsin to open a metalworking shop for his prototype textile machine. He partnered with Wisconsin investor W. A. Barber and founded Barber & Colman in an office above the Spengler Brothers machine shop in the Water Power District. In 1900, Colman invented the Hand Knotter, which could quickly and easily tie knots in string. It was in such high demand that Barber & Colman were able to open their own plant in 1902. Soon they had branches in Boston, Massachusetts and the UK. Colman's Warp Tying Machine, introduced in 1904, was also a great success. This machine automated the process of passing threads through the eyes of heddles. Companies could reduce their workforce for this operation by 86%. The company was officially incorporated as the Barber–Colman Company in 1904.

Five new buildings were constructed on the complex by 1907. The following year, Barber–Colman diversified to produce Milling Cutters. These were used by large mills for cutting metal. Their Gear Hobbing Machine came out in two sizes in 1910 and could precisely cut teeth in gears. In 1919, the company purchased the rights to the Warp Drawing Machine from the American Warp Drawing Machine Company. This machine eased the transition of switching warping patterns. In 1921, Barber–Colman introduced a High Speed Warper & Creel and Automatic Spoolers. By 1931, the company also had production facilities in Framingham, Massachusetts; Greenville, South Carolina; Munich, Germany; Chicago; Cincinnati, Ohio; Rochester, New York; and Manchester, England.

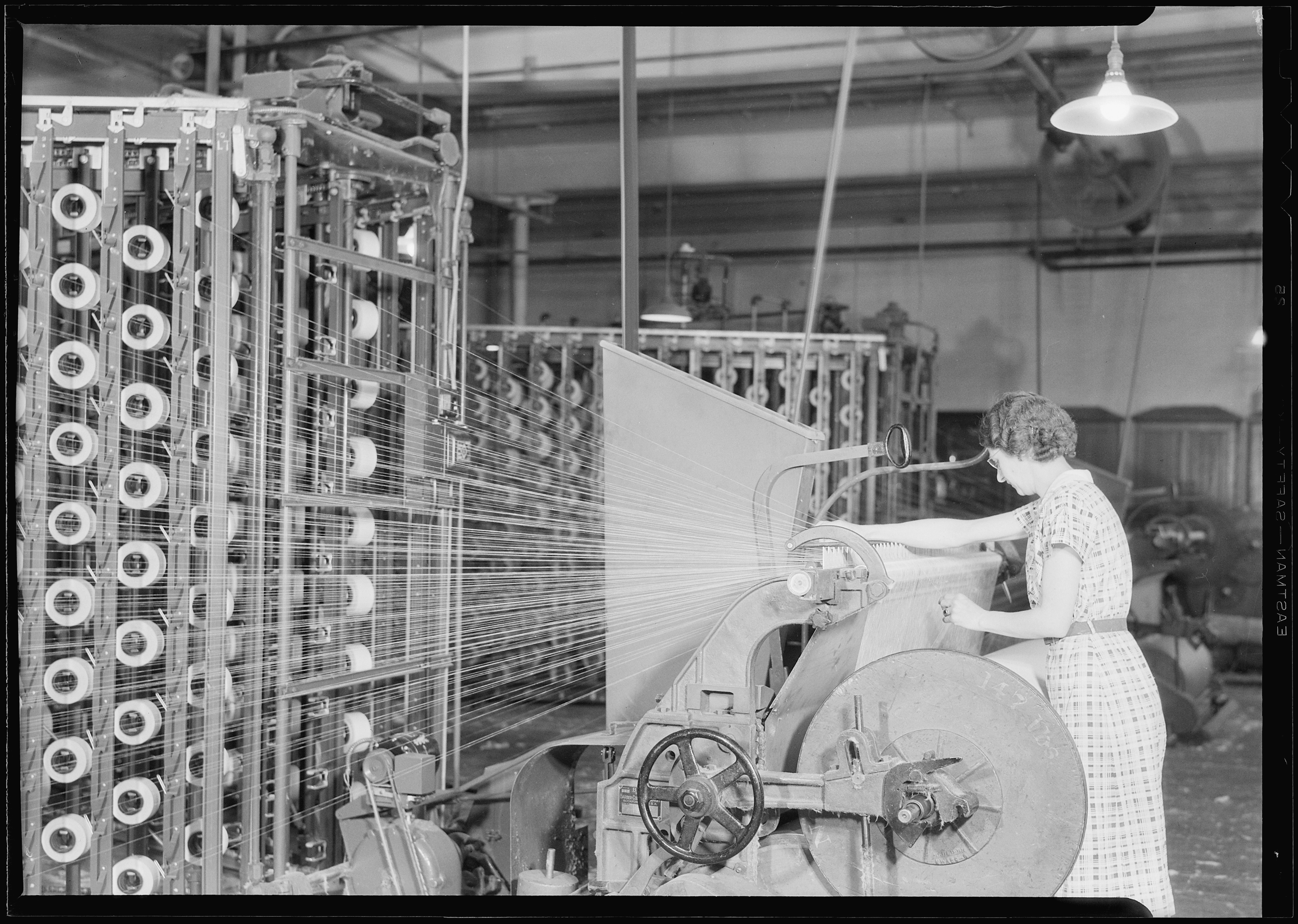
Barber–Colman High Speed Warper in 1937

Howard Colman died in a car accident in 1942. Harry Severson, one of the three original directors, took over leadership of the company. In 1953, the "Park Plant" was built, a one-story, 125,000-square-foot (11,600 m^{2}) building in nearby Loves Park. In 1954, the company purchased the Hendey Machine Company. By 1965, three other additions were complete on the Loves Park facility. In 1968, a 200,000-square-foot (19,000 m^{2}) facility was built just north of the original plant. By 1975, Barber–Colman employed 4000 workers among its 150 locations. The company was family-owned until the death of Walter Colman (Howard's son) in 1983. Following Colman's death, the company was sold off to various companies. Reed–Chatwood purchased the textile operations and continued to manufacture from the original factory until 2001. The machine tool division was sold to fellow Rockford company Bourn & Koch, who provides parts, service, and support for their machines to this day. Barber–Colman henceforth focused on cutting tools and process controls. The remaining divisions were eventually sold off. The Barber–Colman trademark is held by Eurotherm Controls, Inc. The historic complex has been vacated since Reed–Chatwood relocated in 2001. The City of Rockford currently owns the property, purchasing it for $750,000 in 2002. On August 8, 2006, it was recognized by the National Park Service with a listing on the National Register of Historic Places.
