= Barber-Colman knotter =

Textile machinery

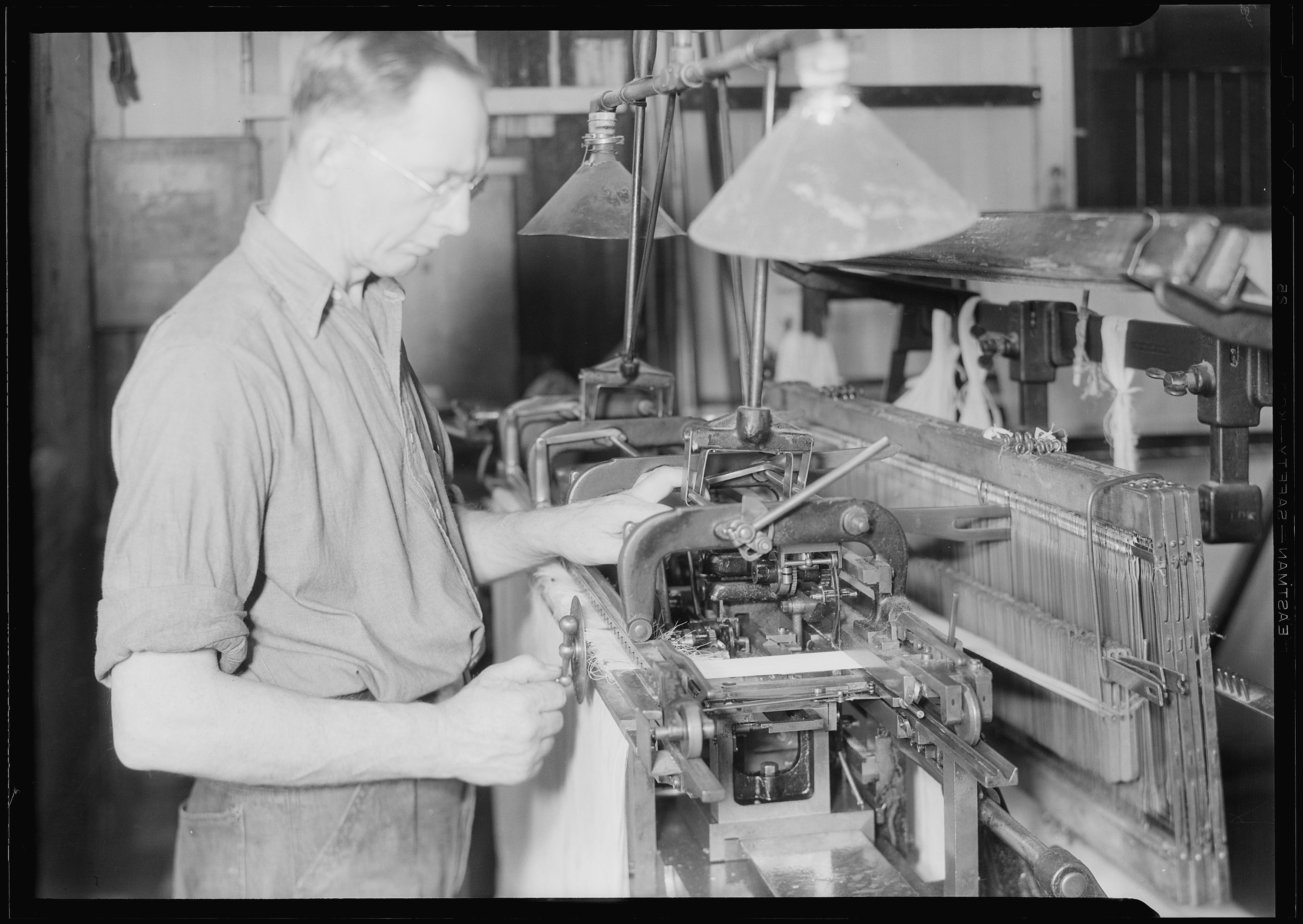
A tenter using a Barber-Colman knotter

A Barber-Colman knotter is a piece of textile machinery used in a weaving shed. When all the warp carried on the weavers beam has been used, a new beam replaces it. Each end has to pass through the eyes on the existing heddles, and through the existing reed. The knotter takes each new thread and knots it the existing end, which will pull it through the correct healds and reed, saving much time. A good man could do 32 or 33 warps a day.

== See also ==
- Barber-Colman Company
