= Briercliffe =

Civil parish in Lancashire, England

Coordinates: 53.810°N 2.190°W

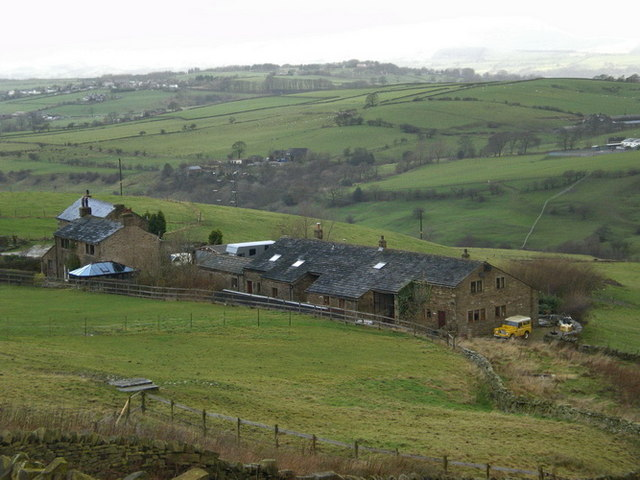
- Monk Hall farm

- Shown within Burnley Borough Location within Lancashire
- Area: 6.53 sq mi (16.9 km^{2})
- Population: 4,031 (2011)
  - Density: 617/sq mi (238/km^{2})
- OS grid reference: SD8749034897
- Civil parish: Briercliffe with Extwistle
- District: Burnley
- Shire county: Lancashire
- Region: North West
- Country: England
- Sovereign state: United Kingdom
- Post town: BURNLEY
- Postcode district: BB10
- Dialling code: 01282
- Police: Lancashire
- Fire: Lancashire
- Ambulance: North West
- UK Parliament: Burnley

Briercliffe (historically Briercliffe-with-Extwistle) is a civil parish in the borough of Burnley, in Lancashire, England. It is situated 3 miles (4.8 km) north of Burnley. The parish contains suburbs of Burnley (including Harle Syke and Haggate), and the rural area north east of the town. Hamlets in the parish include Cockden, Lane Bottom and in the Extwistle area, the tiny hamlet of Roggerham. According to the 2011 United Kingdom census, the parish has a population of 4,031.

The parish adjoins the Burnley parish of Worsthorne-with-Hurstwood and the unparished area of Burnley, the Pendle parishes of Brierfield, Nelson and Trawden Forest and West Yorkshire.

== History ==
The name Briercliffe probably comes from the Old English words brer "briar" and clif, a steep slope or declivity. Extwistle may have been named from the junction (O.E. twisla) of Swinden Water and the River Don, while the first element could be a corruption of oxen.

The parish contains a number of sites of early human occupation, including:

- Burwains Camp prehistoric defended settlement - A circular univallate (single-walled) defended enclosure c.45 metres (148 ft) across, surrounded by a ditch and bank, with entrances in the east and west. Today the 0.3-metre (1 ft 0 in) wide ditch is only approximately 0.2 metres (7.9 in) deep and the bank no more than 0.3 metres (1 ft 0 in) high and about 2 metres (6 ft 7 in) across. The site is located on Broad Bank Hill, overlooking the valley of Thursden Brook. Thought to be a prehistoric settlement, limited archaeological excavation in 1950 recovered some Neolithic finds but was insufficient to more accurately date the site.
- Small stone circle on Delf Hill - About 80 metres (260 ft) east of the summit of Delf Hill there is a small stone circle, thought to date from the late Neolithic to the mid Bronze Age. Seven stones, some of which are still standing, have been arranged in a 7-metre (23 ft) circle. In the centre is a 0.2-metre (7.9 in) high, 2.4-metre (7 ft 10 in) diameter cairn surrounded by a shallow ditch. Limited archaeological excavation on the cairn was undertaken in 1842, during which three interment urns were discovered.
- Pike Low bowl barrow and site of beacon, Bonfire Hill - Located on the summit of Bonfire Hill is a bowl barrow thought to date from the Bronze Age. It is a 15-metre (49 ft) by 13-metre (43 ft) oval mound of earth and stones up to 0.6 metres (2 ft 0 in) high. The site was used as part of a system of warning beacons during the medieval period and the top of the mound has been flattened to create a platform for the bonfire. This is a rare example of such a combination.
- Beadle Hill Romano-British farmstead - Located at the western end of Beadle Hill, with extensive views over the surrounding area. Inner and outer ditches are separated by an earth and stone rampart, around a farmstead enclosure about 75 metres (246 ft) square, with an entrance on the eastern side.
- Twist Castle Romano-British farmstead - Located at the western end of Twist Hill, with extensive views over the surrounding area. An earth and stone rampart surviving up to 1 metre (3 ft 3 in) high, around a rectangular farmstead enclosure about 44 by 40 metres (144 by 131 ft), with an entrance on the eastern side. There would also have been an outer ditch but little trace now remains. Attached to the south eastern side of the enclosure, next to the entrance, is a c.18-metre (59 ft) square annexe also with an earth and stone wall.

After the Norman Conquest of England, Briercliffe was part of the manor of Ightenhill, itself a part of the Honour of Clitheroe. Extwistle had been granted as a manor by the 12th century, when the mesne lord Richard de Malbis gave half of its land to the canons of Newbo Abbey. The remaining half seems to have come into the possession of the Abbot of Kirkstall Abbey during the 1300s.

=== Extwistle Hall ===
Extwistle Hall stands high on Extwistle Moor between Haggate, east of Brierfield, and the village of Worsthorne. It is a Grade II* listed former gentry hall-house, built principally during the 16th and 17th centuries by the Parker family, and is now in a ruinous condition.

The Parker family's association with Extwistle predates the construction of the surviving hall. In 1446 John Parker of Monk Hall and Richard Towneley of Towneley Hall were recorded as jointly holding land in Extwistle. John Parker, who died in 1507, held the capital messuage of Monk Hall together with other property in Extwistle and Briercliffe.

Following the Dissolution of the Monasteries, Robert Parker acquired former monastic land in Extwistle in 1537, consolidating the family's holdings in the township. Extwistle Hall subsequently became the principal seat of the Parker family.

The surviving building is described by Historic England as a 16th- and 17th-century gentry hall-house, built of coursed sandstone and arranged irregularly around three sides of a small courtyard. The hall range on the south side rises to three storeys, with the first-floor hall above a service basement. At the east end is a lower two-storey cross-wing, probably dating from the 16th century, while the west end incorporates a four-storey stair wing which survives from what was once a substantially larger later-17th-century cross-wing.

Notable architectural features include a large hall window of thirty lights divided by a king mullion and two transoms, a 16th-century window of three round-headed lights, king-post roof trusses and surviving decorative plasterwork. The hall contains a moulded arched fireplace and a foliated overmantel bearing the Latin inscription CRAS NESCIO CUIUS.

The Parkers became prominent members of the Lancashire gentry. John Parker of Extwistle served as High Sheriff of Lancashire in 1653 and Robert Parker held the same office in 1710. Robert Parker married Elizabeth Banastre, a co-heiress of Christopher Banastre of Bank, through whom property at Cuerden passed into the Parker family.

The Parkers also had longstanding connections with the Towneley family. Members of the two families were joint landholders in Extwistle by the 15th century, and in 1561 John Parker of Extwistle and John Towneley of Towneley jointly confirmed regulations governing the use of Extwistle Moor. John Parker of Extwistle also married Margaret Townley, daughter of Lawrence Townley of the Barnside branch of the family. Several generations later Robert Parker of Cuerden married Anne Townley, heiress of the Townleys of Royle, and their descendants became known as the Townley Parkers.

The Parker family's occupation of Extwistle as its principal residence ended in the early 18th century. On 17 March 1718 an explosion of gunpowder occurred in the dining room of the hall. Captain Robert Parker, his daughters Mary Townley and Betty Atkinson, and a child were seriously injured, and two rooms caught fire. Parker died from his injuries on 21 April.

According to the later account of the incident, the accident occurred after Parker returned from shooting in wet weather and placed his greatcoat near the fire to dry without first removing a quantity of gunpowder from it. The family subsequently ceased to use Extwistle Hall as its principal residence and established itself at Cuerden Hall, although Extwistle and the surrounding estate remained in the ownership of the Parkers and their descendants.

The family's move westwards did not end its ownership of land in Briercliffe and Extwistle. Through later marriages and inheritances the Townley Parker estates came to include Cuerden, the former Townley estate at Royle and Astley Hall, while Extwistle remained part of the family's East Lancashire holdings. By the 19th century Extwistle Hall was principally used as an estate property and farmhouse rather than as the family's main residence.

The Victoria History of the County of Lancaster, published in 1911, described Extwistle Hall as a farmhouse and recorded the continued ownership of substantial land in the township by the descendants of the Parker family. Historic England records that the hall was altered, partly destroyed and remodelled during the later 19th century with what remains being around half the footprint of the house at the start of the 19th century.

Extwistle Hall was designated a Grade II* listed building on 1 April 1953. By the late 20th and early 21st centuries the building had fallen into serious disrepair. It was reported in 2012 to have been unoccupied for more than twenty years and to be owned by an Isle of Man-based property company. That year plans costing approximately £2.4 million were announced for a development intended to enable the restoration of the hall.

The proposed restoration did not proceed and Extwistle Hall has remained on the Heritage at Risk Register. Burnley Borough Council's 2023–24 Authority Monitoring Report recorded the building's condition as "very bad" and placed it in priority category A, stating that no progress had been made on temporary or permanent repairs or refurbishment and that no solution for its repair and reuse had been agreed.

== Governance ==
Briercliffe-with-Extwistle was once a township in the ancient parish of Whalley, becoming a civil parish in 1866. In 1894, the parish was dissolved, part in the southwest moving into the county borough of Burnley, (Note: The old township boundary with Burnley followed the River Brun and its tributary the Walshaw Clough stream.) with the rest becoming a new parish called Briercliffe, forming part of the Burnley Rural District. Since 1974 Briercliffe has formed part of the Borough of Burnley. 2004 saw the parish gain some territory from the unparished area of Burnley at the western end of Harle Syke.

The Briercliffe ward on the borough council covers the same area as the parish along with a small part of Burnley. The ward elects three councillors, currently Margaret Lishman, Anne Kelly and Gordon Lishman, all from the Liberal Democrats. The parish is represented on Lancashire County Council as part of the Burnley Rural division, represented since 2017 by Cosima Towneley (Conservative).

The Member of Parliament for Burnley, the constituency into which the parish falls, is Oliver Ryan of the Labour Party, who was first elected in 2024.

== Demography ==
According to the 2011 United Kingdom census, the parish has a population of 4,031, an increase from 3,187 in the 2001 census. This represents growth of 26.5% over ten years. During the same period the area of the parish has increased from 1,677 hectares (6.47 sq mi; 16.77 km^{2}) to 1,692 hectares (6.53 sq mi; 16.92 km^{2}) (0.9%), giving a population density of 2.38 inhabitants per hectare (620/sq mi; 238/km^{2}).

Harle Syke and Haggate form part of a wider urban area, which had a population of 149,796 in 2001. A similar but larger, Burnley Built-up area defined in the 2011 census had a population of 149,422.

In 2011 the average (mean) age of residents was 40 years, with a roughly even distribution between males and females. The racial composition was 98.1% White (96.8% White British), 1.1% Asian, 0.1% Black, 0.6% Mixed and 0.1% Other. The largest religious groups were Christian (73%) and Muslim (0.7%). 76.3% of adults between the ages of 16 and 74 were classed as economically active and in work.

Population of Briercliffe parish over time
Year	1901	1911	1921	1931	1951	1961	2001	2011
Population	2,324	3,042	2,903	2,752	2,372	2,117	3,187	4,031

== People ==
- Tattersall Wilkinson was a local antiquarian most usually known as 'The Sage of Roggerham'. Tattersall was well known in Burnley during the late 1800s. He was the first person to uncover the flint daggers and stone circles of nearby Worsthorne, and other antiquities such as burial urns. He also wrote many articles for the Burnley Express and a book of his own (with J.F Tattersall) named 'Memories of Hurstwood'.

== Media gallery ==
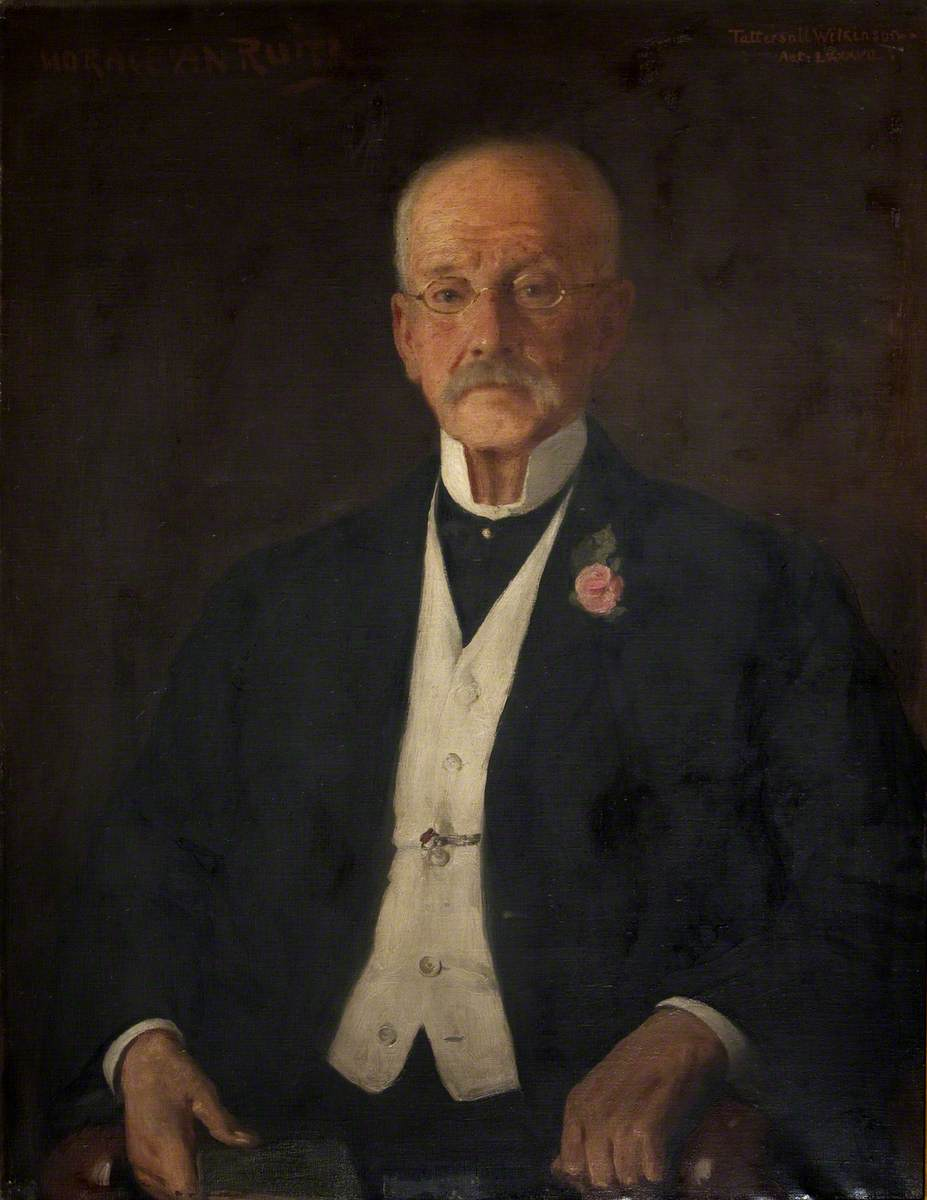
Tattersall Wilkinson

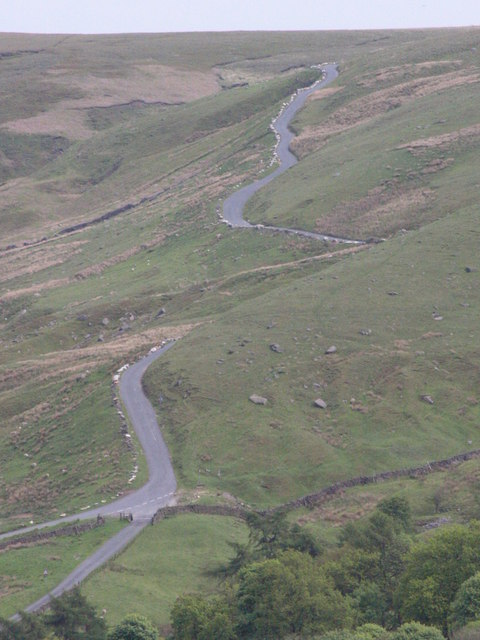
Halifax Road passing through the Thursden Valley

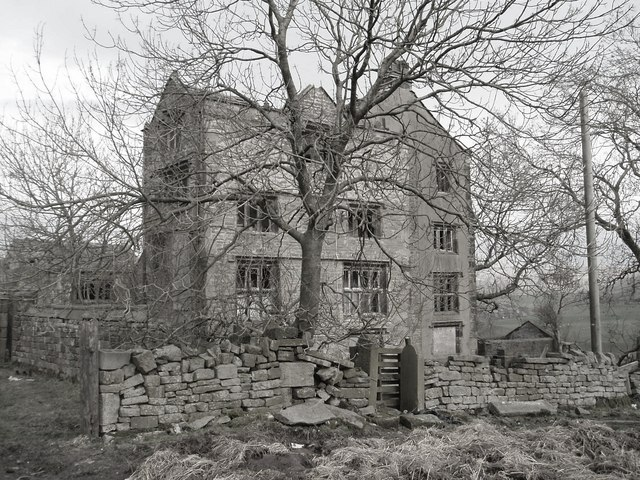
Extwistle Hall

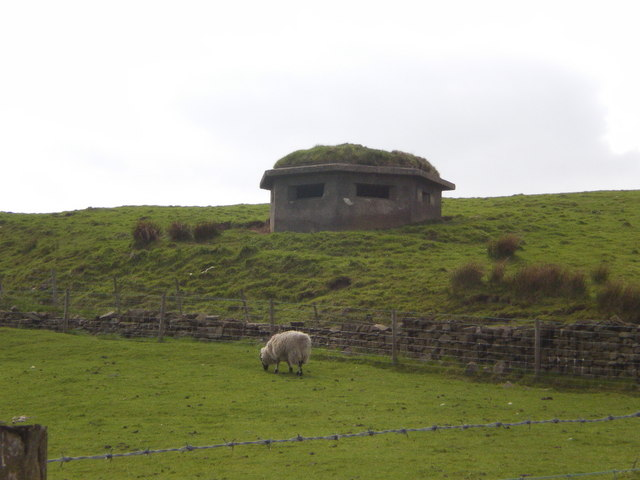
World War II Pillbox

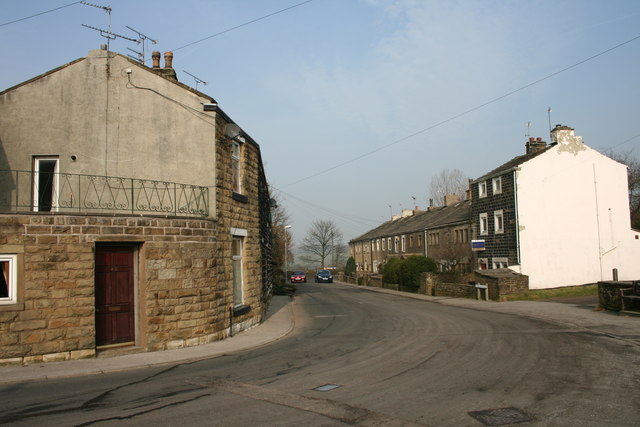
Lane Bottom

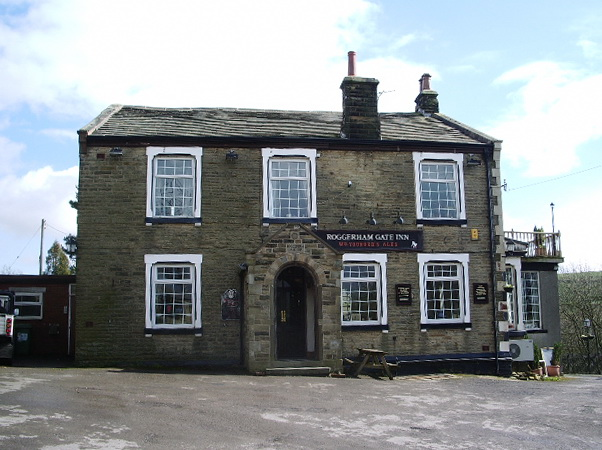
Roggerham Gate Inn

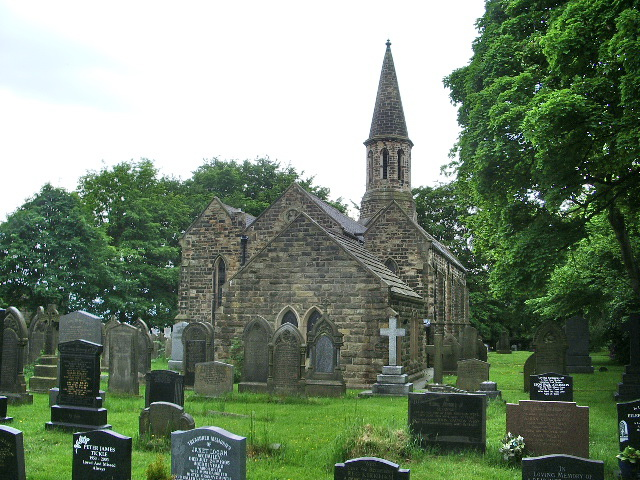
St James' Church Harle Syke

== See also ==
- Listed buildings in Briercliffe
- Scheduled monuments in Lancashire
