= Haggate =

Village in Lancashire, England

Coordinates: 53.813°N 2.195°W

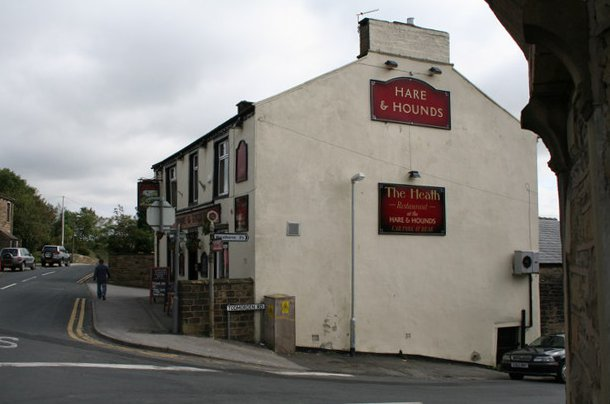
- The Hare and Hounds pub, the first building in Haggate

- Shown within Burnley Borough Location within Lancashire
- OS grid reference: SD871352
- Civil parish: Briercliffe
- District: Burnley
- Shire county: Lancashire
- Region: North West
- Country: England
- Sovereign state: United Kingdom
- Post town: BURNLEY
- Postcode district: BB10
- Dialling code: 01282
- Police: Lancashire
- Fire: Lancashire
- Ambulance: North West
- UK Parliament: Burnley

Haggate is a small village within the parish of Briercliffe, situated three miles north of Burnley, Lancashire. The village is mostly built around a small crossroads, with routes towards Burnley, Nelson and Todmorden. The first buildings in the village date from the 16th century, when the Hare and Hounds public house, which still stands to this day, was built. The village was first officially documented in the 17th century. The origins of the name Haggate are unclear, although it is thought that it could mean, "the path by the hawthorn trees". The village itself is situated at the top of a hill, 800 feet above sea level. The buildings in the village are predominantly stone-built.

As of 2009, Haggate has two public houses, a school and a Baptist church.

Haggate has direct road links with Burnley and Nelson, and is served by local bus services (111 and 112) operated by Burnley Bus Company.

== History ==
The parish of Briercliffe has been present since at least 1235 when the Lordship of Briercliffe, Edmund de Lacy, was granted the Charter of Freewarden, allowing him to use the area for hunting hares, rabbits and foxes. The earliest knowledge of the village dates back to the late 16th century when the Hare and Hounds public house, which took its name from the hunting activity in the region, was established. The first official documentation of the village was in the early 17th century, although historians have been unable to elucidate the exact roots of the name. Local folklore suggested that the name came from the fact that an elderly woman (a "hag") from the village was known to sit on a five-barred gate and watch the world. However, it is now believed that the name is more likely to have been derived from two words – "hack", meaning a hawthorn tree and "gate", an archaic word for a path or route.

In 1644, during the English Civil War, the village was the scene of an altercation in which five people, probably Roundhead supporters, were killed by King Charles I's troops.

By the 1700s, the people of Haggate worked mostly as farmers and were major producers of wool. There was also a coal mine, which remained open until the middle of the 20th century, that supplied coal to the mills of Harle Syke and Briercliffe. In the mid-19th century a group of men from Haggate founded the village's first cotton mill, which is today known as 'Oxford Mill', which became the base of many Burnley cotton firms during the time when Lancashire was one of the cotton capitals of the world. There was a cricket field in the village where many Lancashire cricketers played at the invitation of the Smith family who lived in the village. Haggate School, originally a sunday school for the Baptist Church, was built on the site of the cricket pitch in 1882. The school later became the village primary school, and was more recently used by Burnley College.
