= St James' Church, Briercliffe =

Coordinates: 53.8107°N 2.2028°W

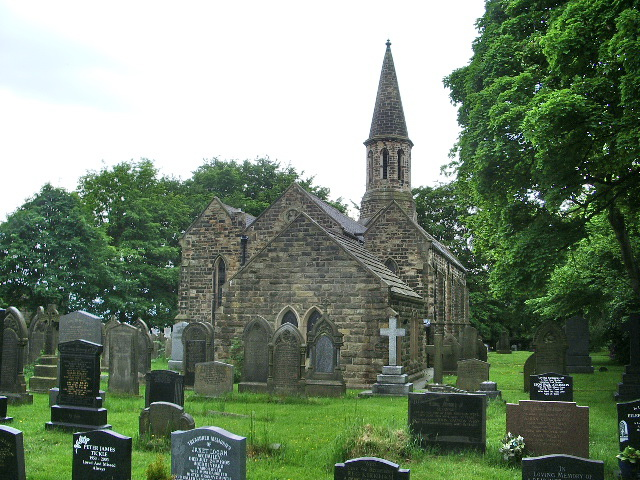
- St James' Church, Briercliffe, from the east

- Location in the Borough of Burnley
- OS grid reference: SD 867 349
- Location: Church Street, Briercliffe, Lancashire
- Country: England
- Denomination: Anglican
- Churchmanship: Liberal Anglo-Catholic
- Website: St James, Briercliffe

History
- Status: Parish church
- Dedication: Saint James the Great
- Consecrated: 26 September 1841

Architecture
- Functional status: Active
- Heritage designation: Grade II
- Designated: 10 March 1987
- Architect(s): Edmund Sharpe; Paley and Austin
- Architectural type: Church
- Style: Gothic Revival
- Groundbreaking: 1839
- Completed: 1992

Specifications
- Materials: Sandstone, slate roof

Administration
- Province: York
- Diocese: Blackburn
- Archdeaconry: Blackburn
- Deanery: Burnley
- Parish: St James, Briercliffe

Clergy
- Vicar: Rev'd Michael Read

St James' Church is in Church Street, Briercliffe, Lancashire, England. It is an active Anglican parish church in the deanery of Burnley, the archdeaconry of Blackburn and the diocese of Blackburn. The church is recorded in the National Heritage List for England as a designated Grade II listed building.

== History ==
St James was built in 1839–41 and designed by the Lancaster architect Edmund Sharpe. The church cost about £1,300 (equivalent to £120,000 in 2025), most of which was raised by public subscription, and the land was given by the Duke of Buccleuch. It was consecrated on 26 September 1841 by Rt Revd John Bird Sumner, Bishop of Chester. At that stage, the church had seating for 515 people. The chapelry district of Saint James, Briercliffe was assigned in 1843. In 1869 a new steeple was added to the church and other changes were made to the church by Paley and Austin, Sharpe's successors in his Lancaster practice. In 1881 new pews were installed and the old pulpit was removed. In 1992 the choir vestry was enlarged and a meeting room was built.

== Architecture ==
=== Exterior ===
The church is constructed in sandstone with a stone slate roof, and is in Early English style. Its plan consists of a nave with a short chancel and a tower at the west end. The roof is steeply pitched and divided into three, although internally the church consists of a single chamber with a flat ceiling. The nave is divided into bays by pilaster buttresses, between which are lancet windows. The tower is partly embraced by gabled pseudo-aisles, and is in two stages. The lower stage contains a west door, above which are lancets and gables. From this rises an octagonal drum containing a belfry with lancets, and over this is a short octagonal spire. At the east end is a stepped triple lancet window.

=== Interior ===
Inside the church are galleries on three sides supported by cast iron columns; the galleries contain box pews. The two-manual organ was built in 1865 by Foster and Andrews of Hull. Improvements were made by the same firm in 1901 and 1906. In 1927 Jardine and Company of Manchester cleaned the organ and in 1989 they restored it.

== Appraisal ==
In the Buildings of England series it is described as "a small, rather strange church", but Hughes disagrees, saying "it is one of Edmund Sharpe's more delightful designs". In the National Heritage List for England the description states that it is an "unusually unaltered example of an early 19th-century church".

== External features ==
The churchyard contains the war graves of five soldiers of World War I, and two of World War II.

== See also ==
- Listed buildings in Briercliffe
- List of architectural works by Edmund Sharpe
- List of ecclesiastical works by Paley and Austin
