= River Don, Lancashire =

River in Lancashire, England

Coordinates: 53.7976°N 2.2141°W

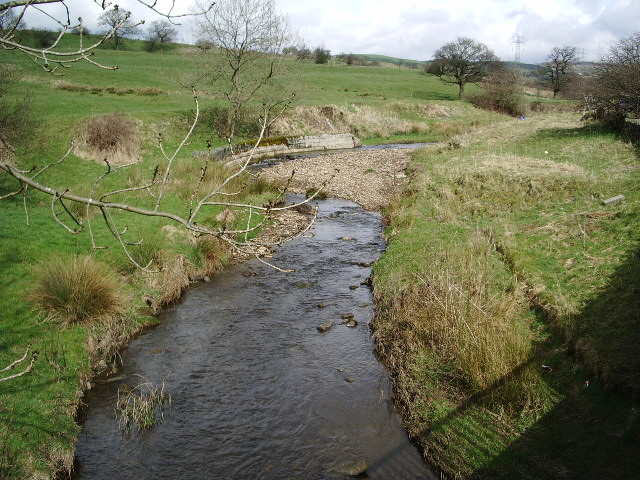
River Don at Cockden Bridge

The River Don is a river in Lancashire, England. It is 6.64 miles (10.69 km) long and has a catchment area of 4.18 square miles (1,082.31 ha).

Rising on Peacock Hill as Hey Stacks Clough, the stream runs westwards to Black Clough Head where it collects Tom Groove and becomes Black Clough. Black Clough continues past Robin Hood's House to Rapes Hole. Now known as Thursden Brook, the river passes by Cockridge Copy and into the Thursden Valley north east of the town of Burnley. Thursden Brook becomes the River Don at Cockden Bridge and runs through Scrogg's Wood near Heasandford, flowing into the River Brun at Netherwood Bridge.
