= Ellers Mill =

Historic water-powered textile mill in Dalston, Cumbria

- Buckabank Mill
- Aerial view of the Ellers Mill complex in Buckabank, showing the mill buildings, chimney stack, and adjacent woodland

General information
- Status: Operational
- Location: Buckabank, Dalston, Cumbria, England, Buckabank, Dalston, Carlisle, CA5 7QJ
- Coordinates: 54°50′10″N 2°58′50″W
- Completed: 1782
- Client: George Hodson
- Owner: Cowens Ltd
- Operator: Cowens Ltd

Design and construction
- Architect: George Hodson

Ellers Mill (historically known as Buckabank Mill) is a historic water-powered textile manufactory situated on the eastern bank of the River Caldew in Buckabank, within the civil parish of Dalston, Cumbria, England. Established in 1782, it is among the earliest water-powered cotton mills constructed in Cumbria, with an unbroken history of fibre and textile processing on the site spanning more than two centuries, making it what is widely considered the oldest continually working cotton mill in the world. The final section of the Cumbria Way long-distance trail passes directly across the mill property alongside the Caldew leat.

Originating during the expansion of mechanised textile manufacturing in late-18th-century Cumberland, the works produced calicoes and corduroys before transitioning to surgical waddings and absorbent cotton wool in the 19th century under Jacob Cowen & Sons. During the 20th century, leadership of the mill expanded beyond the founding family to include directors from the Trimble and Coulthard families. The mill remains active under Cowens Ltd, producing technical non-woven filtration fabrics and bio-absorbents.

== History ==
=== Construction and early cotton trade (1780–1800) ===
Mechanised cotton manufacturing was introduced to Dalston around 1780–1782 by George Hodson, an entrepreneur from Manchester with experience in the Lancashire cotton industry. In 1782, Hodson directed the construction of a four-storey mill constructed of local red sandstone alongside the River Caldew. The site took its name from "ellers", a northern English dialect word for the alder trees that grew along the riverbanks and weir channels.

The mill utilised water power from the Caldew to drive spinning mules and preparatory carding engines, manufacturing fustians, corduroys, velverets, thicksets, and grey calicoes, as well as providing dyeing and finishing operations. Local landholders and tradesmen took financial shares in the enterprise, including John Bewley (1752–1822) of Buckabank, who operated a nearby carpentry and building shop. Following Hodson, management of the works passed to the firm Messrs. Hebson, Lamb, Forster, and Waldie, later recorded in an 1810 Carlisle Journal advertisement as Messrs. Lamb, Hebson, & Co.

The opening of the mills led to significant demographic and economic growth across the parish; Dalston's population increased from 220 families in 1747 to 1,900 people by 1794. A contemporary survey in 1794 noted that Dalston's cotton manufactories employed approximately 500 individuals, including 258 adults and 170 children residing in the parish, while supporting 63 weavers, 40 spinners, and an outwork network of 33 weavers in the adjacent parish of Great Orton.

=== 19th-century operations ===
During the Napoleonic Wars, regional industrial production shifted towards coarser textiles and heavy provisioning. In 1821, the mill was acquired by Jacob Cowen, trading as Jacob Cowen & Sons. Cowen adapted the mill's carding machinery to produce carded absorbent cotton wool and surgical waddings, supplying medical facilities across Britain and its colonies.

By 1847, the industrial mill race system around Buckabank supplied water power to three cotton mills, an iron forge, a flax mill, two corn mills, and a sawmill.

=== 1901 fire and wartime production ===
In 1901, a fire caused by a lightning strike burned out the upper floors of the original 1782 building. The mill was subsequently rebuilt as a reinforced two-storey structure of brick and sandstone, and became known locally as "The Cotton Wool Factory".

During both the First World War and Second World War, the facility came under British government control, operating continuously to manufacture surgical waddings, hospital dressings, and emergency medical supplies for the armed forces.

=== Management: Trimble and Coulthard families ===
In the late 19th and 20th centuries, directorship and management of the factory expanded to include other local families:

- Trimble family: The Trimbles, who had operated a commercial brewery along the Caldew in Dalston since the late 18th century, provided more than 50 years of executive directorship at Ellers Mill, guiding production through raw-material supply controls during the World Wars and into the post-war era.
- Coulthard family: Members of the Coulthard family entered the management of Cowens Ltd during the 20th century. Over four generations—including Joseph Coulthard, George Coulthard, Michael Coulthard (director until 1994), and Managing Director Jonathan Coulthard—the company shifted production from traditional surgical wadding into non-woven filter media, bio-absorbent rolls, and technical environmental textiles.

== Geography and recreation ==
Ellers Mill is situated approximately 0.5 miles (0.8 km) south of Dalston village on a low floodplain between the River Caldew and the Cumbrian Coast Line railway. The designated path of the Cumbria Way, a 70 miles (113 km) waymarked long-distance route between Ulverston and Carlisle, enters the factory grounds from the south along the riverbank path, passing directly adjacent to the mill structures, tailrace, and chimney before heading north towards Dalston bridge.

== Industrial continuity and power sources ==
Textile manufacturing at Ellers Mill began with water-powered spinning in 1782, and the site has maintained continuous fibre-processing operations along the River Caldew ever since. Following the 1901 fire, the surviving masonry was incorporated into a rebuilt two-storey facility, after which the business adapted from traditional cotton processing to specialized surgical waddings and modern technical non-woven media.

The site's power systems reflect the broader technological development of British industry:

- 1782: Driven entirely by a waterwheel powered by a millrace diverted from the River Caldew.
- 19th century: Supplemental coal-fired steam boilers installed to assist water power during periods of low river flow.
- 1950s: Conversion to electric motor drives connected to the national electrical grid.
- 21st century: Installation of a commercial rooftop photovoltaic solar array to supply electricity for manufacturing operations.

== See also ==
- Cumbria Way
- Dalston, Cumbria
- River Caldew
- Lea Mills
- Textile manufacture during the Industrial Revolution
