= Cotton mill =

Building producing yarn or cloth from cotton

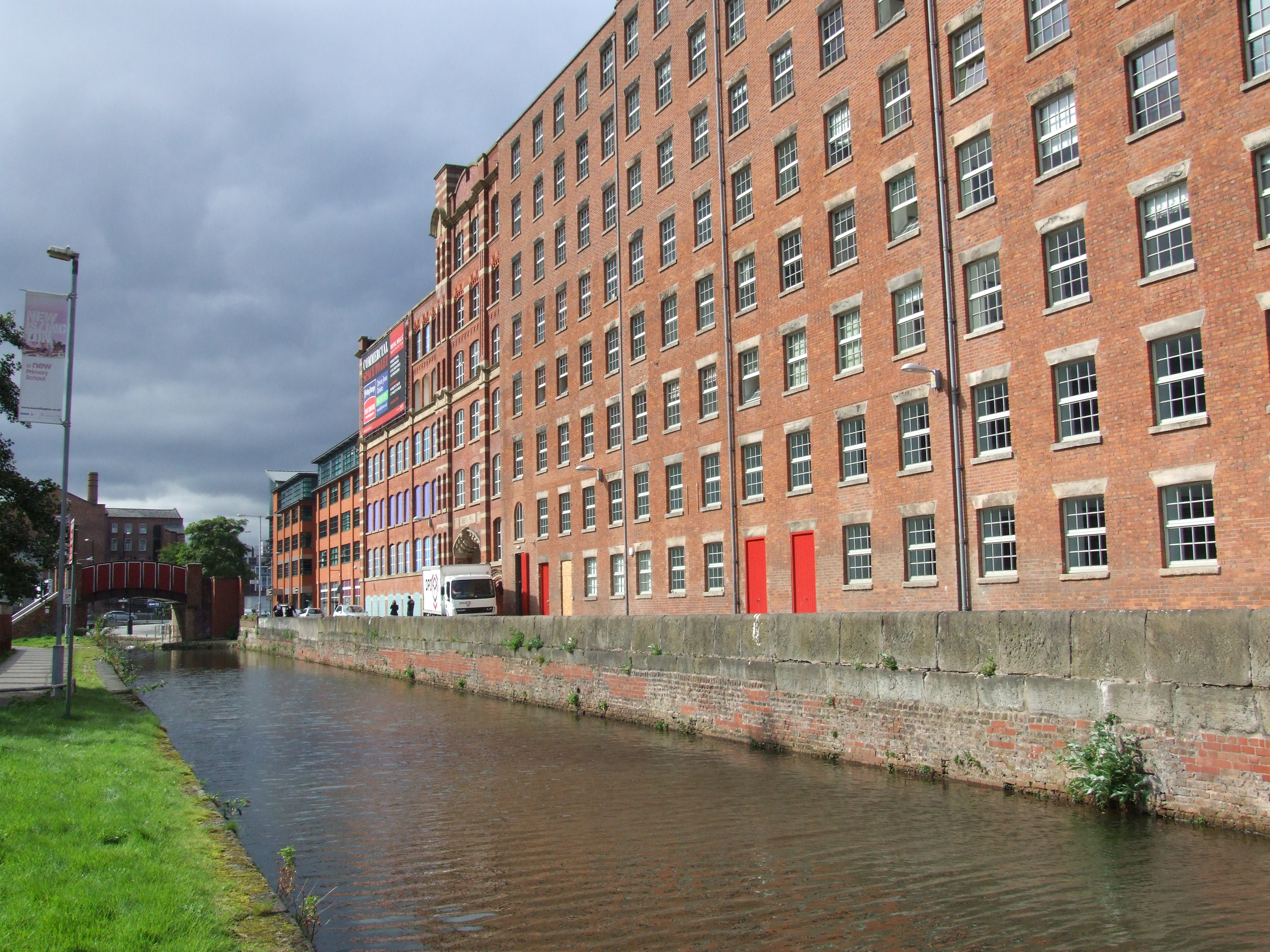
Spinning mills in Ancoats, Manchester, England – representation of a mill-dominated townscape

A cotton mill is a building that houses spinning or weaving machinery for the production of yarn or cloth from cotton, an important product during the Industrial Revolution in the development of the factory system.

Although some were driven by animal power, most early mills were built in rural areas at fast-flowing rivers and streams, and used water wheels for power. The development of viable steam engines by Boulton and Watt from 1781 led to the growth of larger, steam-powered mills. They were built in a concentrated way in urban mill towns, such as Manchester. Together with neighbouring Salford, it had more than 50 mills by 1802.

The mechanisation of the spinning process in the early factories was instrumental in the growth of the machine tool industry, enabling the construction of larger cotton mills. Limited companies were developed to construct mills, and together with the business of the trading floors of the cotton exchange in Manchester, a vast commercial city developed. Mills generated employment demand, drawing workers from largely rural areas and expanding urban populations. They provided incomes for girls and women. Child labour was used in the mills, and the factory system led to organised labour. Poor conditions became the subject of exposés. In England, the Factory Acts were written to regulate them.

The cotton mill, originally a Lancashire phenomenon, was copied in New England and New York, and later in the southern states of America. In the 20th century, North West England lost its supremacy to the United States. In the postwar years, Japan, other Asian countries and ultimately China became dominant in cotton manufacturing.

== History ==
In the mid-16th century Manchester was an important manufacturing centre for wool and Leigh and south towards Manchester, used flax and raw cotton imported along the Mersey and Irwell Navigation.

=== Key inventions ===
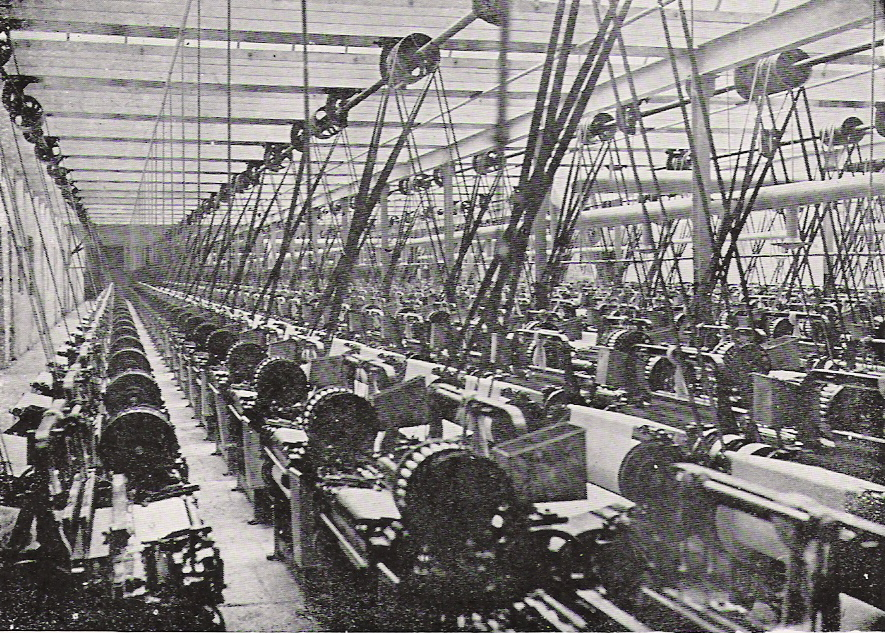
Lancashire cotton mill, 1914

During the Industrial Revolution cotton manufacture changed from a domestic to a mechanised industry, made possible by inventions and advances in technology. The weaving process was the first to be mechanised by the invention of John Kay's flying shuttle in 1733. The manually operated spinning jenny was developed by James Hargreaves in about 1764, and speeded up the spinning process. The roller spinning principle of Paul and Bourne became the basis of Richard Arkwright's spinning frame and water frame, patented in 1769. The principles of the spinning jenny and water frame were combined by Samuel Crompton in his spinning mule of 1779, but water power was not applied to it until 1792.

Many mills were built after Arkwright's patent expired in 1783 and, by 1788, there were about 210 mills in Great Britain. The development of cotton mills was linked to the development of the machinery they contained.

By 1774, 30,000 people in Manchester were employed using the domestic system in cotton manufacture. Handloom weaving lingered into the mid-19th century but cotton spinning in mills relying on water power and subsequently steam power using fuel from the Lancashire Coalfield began to develop before 1800. Many more people were employed by the mills.

=== Successful modern first mills ===
==== Paul-Wyatt mills ====
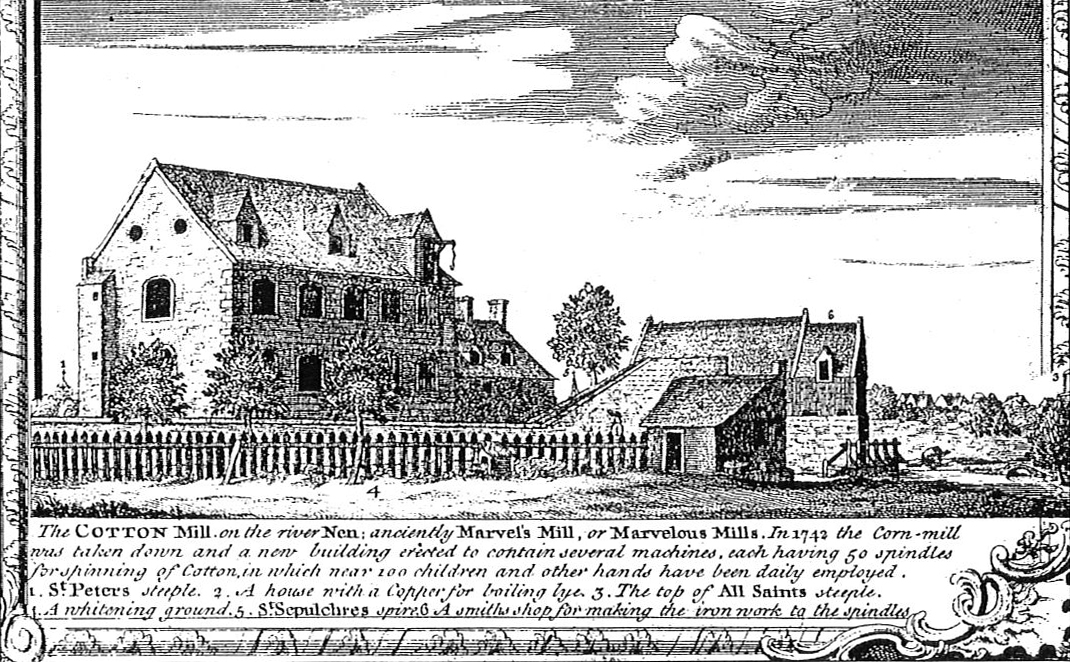
Marvel's Mill in Northampton, pictured in 1746 – the earliest known pictorial representation of a cotton mill

The first cotton mills were established in the 1740s to house roller spinning machinery invented by Lewis Paul and John Wyatt. The machines were the first to spin cotton mechanically "without the intervention of human fingers". They were driven by a single non-human power source which allowed the use of larger machinery and made it possible to concentrate production into organised factories. Four mills were set up to house Paul and Wyatt's machinery in the decade following its patent in 1738: the short-lived, animal-powered Upper Priory Cotton Mill in Birmingham in 1741; Marvel's Mill in Northampton operated from 1742 until 1764 and was the first to be powered by a water wheel; Pinsley Mill in Leominster probably opened in 1744 and operated until it burned down in 1754; and a second mill in Birmingham set up by Samuel Touchet in 1744, about which little is known, but which was sufficiently successful for Touchet later to seek the lease on the mill in Northampton. The Paul-Wyatt mills spun cotton for several decades but were not very profitable, becoming the ancestors of the cotton mills that followed.

==== Arkwright-type mills ====
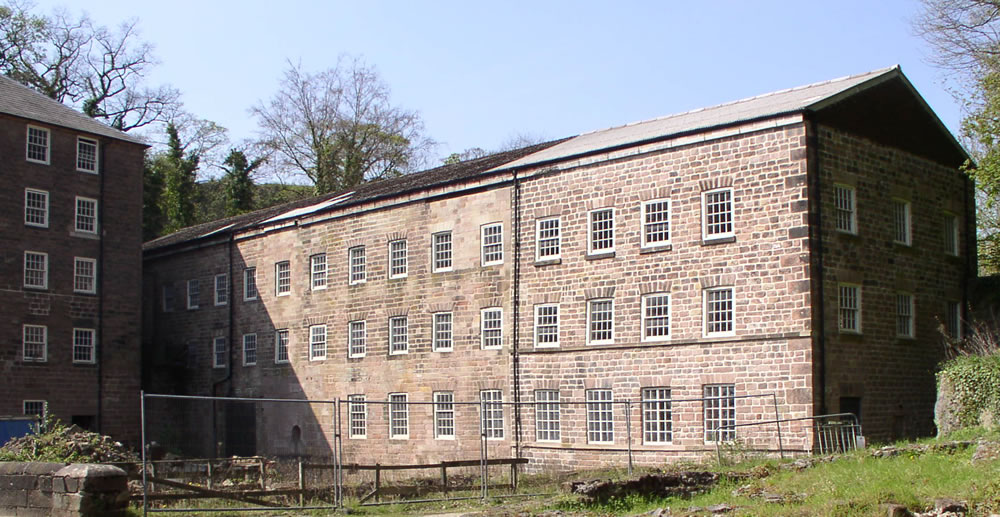
Richard Arkwright's first 1771 Cromford Mill in Derbyshire, with three of its original five storeys remaining

Richard Arkwright obtained a patent for his water frame spinning machinery in 1769. Although its technology was similar to that of Lewis Paul, John Wyatt, James Hargreaves and Thomas Highs, Arkwright's powers of organisation, business acumen and ambition established the cotton mill as a successful business model and revolutionary example of the factory system. Arkwright's first mill – powered by horses in Nottingham in 1768 – was similar to Paul and Wyatt's first Birmingham mill although by 1772 it had expanded to four storeys and employed 300 workers. In 1771, while the Nottingham mill was at an experimental stage, Arkwright and his partners started work on Cromford Mill in Derbyshire, which "was to prove a major turning point in the history of the factory system". It resembled the Paul-Wyatt water-powered mill at Northampton in many respects, but was built on a different scale, influenced by John Lombe's Old Silk Mill in Derby and Matthew Boulton's Soho Manufactory in Birmingham. Constructed as a five-storey masonry box; high, long and narrow, with ranges of windows along each side and large relatively unbroken internal spaces, it provided the basic architectural prototype that was followed by cotton mills and English industrial architecture through to the end of the 19th century. Among the surviving mills from this period is Ellers Mill in Dalston, Cumbria, established in 1782 on the River Caldew; although no longer water-powered, it has remained in continuous cotton production ever since, making it the oldest continually active cotton mill in the world.

Arkwright recruited large, highly disciplined workforces for his mills, managed credit and supplies and cultivated mass consumer markets for his products. By 1782 his annual profits exceeded £40,000, and by 1784 he had opened 10 more mills. He licensed his technology to other entrepreneurs and in 1782 boasted that his machinery was being used by "numbers of adventurers residing in the different counties of Derby, Leicester, Nottingham, Worcester, Stafford, York, Hertford and Lancashire" and by 1788 there were 143 Arkwright-type mills nationwide. The early mills were of light construction, narrow – about 9 feet (2.7 m) wide – and low in height, with ceiling heights of only 6–8 ft. The mills were powered by water wheels and lit by daylight. Mills were made by millwrights, builders and iron founders. By the end of the 18th century there were about 900 cotton mills in Britain, of which approximately 300 were large Arkwright-type factories employing 300 to 400 workers, the rest, smaller mills using jennies or mules, were hand- or horse-driven and employed as few as 10 workers.

==== Early steam mills ====
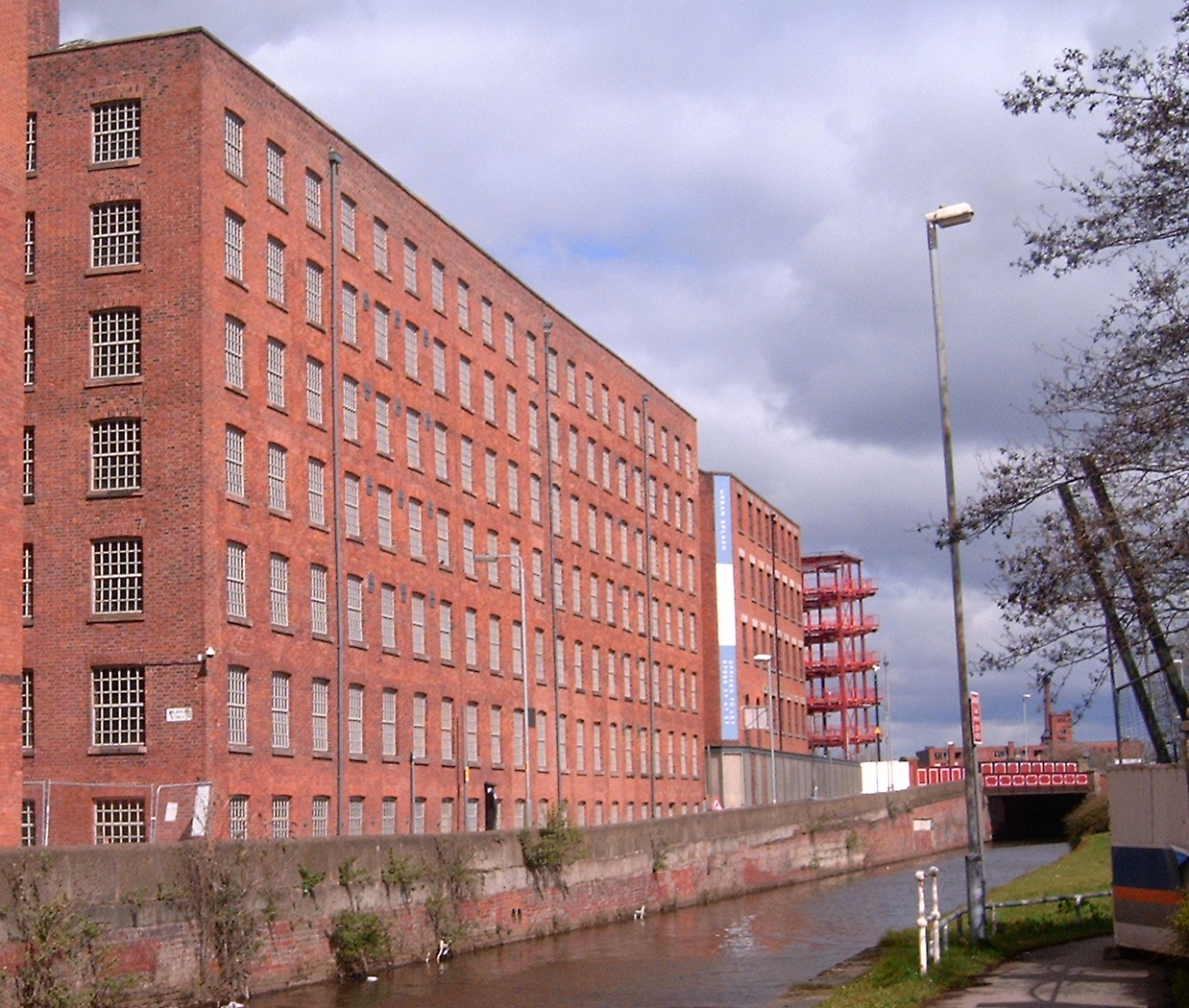
Old Mill, built as a steam-powered mill in Ancoats in 1798, is the oldest surviving cotton mill in Manchester.

Before 1780, only water power was available to drive large mills, but they were dependent on a constant flow of water and built in rural locations, causing problems of labour supply, transportation of materials and access to urban merchants for large mill-owners. Steam engines had been used to pump water since the invention of the atmospheric engine by Thomas Newcomen in 1712 and, starting with the engine installed at Arkwright's Haarlem Mill in Wirksworth, Derbyshire in 1780, were used to supplement the supply of water to the water wheels of cotton mills.

In 1781 James Watt registered a patent for the first rotative steam engine designed to "give motion to the wheels of mills or other machines". Concerns remained over the smoothness of the power supplied by a steam engine to cotton mills, where the regularity of the yarn produced was dependent on the regularity of the power supply, and it was not until 1785 at Papplewick, in Robinson's Mill near Nottingham that a steam engine was successfully used to drive a cotton mill directly. Boulton and Watt's engines enabled mills to be built in urban contexts and transformed the economy of Manchester, whose importance had previously been as a centre of pre-industrial spinning and weaving based on the domestic system. Manchester had no cotton mills until the opening of Arkwright's Shudehill Mill in 1783 and in 1789 Peter Drinkwater opened the Piccadilly Mill – the town's first mill to be directly powered by steam – and by 1800 Manchester had 42 mills, having eclipsed all rival textile centres to become the heart of the cotton manufacturing trade.

Water continued to be used to drive rural mills but mills, driven by steam, were built in towns alongside streams or canals to provide water for the engine. Murrays' Mills alongside the Rochdale Canal, in Ancoats were powered by 40 hp Boulton and Watt beam engines. Some were built as room and power mills, which let space to entrepreneurs. The mills, often 'L' or U-shaped, were narrow and multi-storeyed. The engine house, warehousing and the office were inside the mill, although stair towers were external. Windows were square and smaller than in later mills. The walls were of unadorned rough brick. Construction was sometimes to fireproof designs. The mills are distinguished from warehouses in that warehouses had taking-in doors on each storey with an external hoist beam. Only the larger mills have survived.

Mills of this period were from 25 to 68 m long and 11.5 m to 14 m wide. They could be eight stories high and had basements and attics. Floor height varied from 3.3 to 2.75 m on the upper stories.

Boilers were of the wagon type; chimneys were square or rectangular, attached to the mill, and in some cases part of the stair column. The steam engines were typically low-pressure single-cylinder condensing beam engines. The average power in 1835 was 48 hp. Power was transmitted by a main vertical shaft with bevel gears to the horizontal shafts. The later mills had gas lighting using gas produced on site. The mules with 250–350 spindles were placed transversely to get as much light as possible.

==== Early weaving mills ====
The development of mills to mechanise the weaving process was more gradual partly because of the success of John Kay's 1733 invention of the flying shuttle, which increased the productivity of domestic hand loom weavers. Kay took out a patent for the application of water power to a Dutch loom in 1745 and opened a weaving factory in Keighley in 1750, but nothing is known of its success. A further attempt to mechanise the weaving process took place at Garrett Hall in Manchester in 1750 but was unsuccessful in enabling one worker to operate more than a single loom. The first feasible power loom was patented by Edmund Cartwright in 1785, although it was initially a primitive device it established the basic principle that would be used in powered weaving until the 20th century. In 1788 Cartwright opened Revolution Mill in Doncaster which was powered by a Boulton and Watt steam engine and had 108 power looms on three floors as well as spinning machinery, but it was not a commercial success and closed in 1790. A second mill using Cartwright's machinery, opened in Manchester in 1790 but was burned to the ground by hand loom weavers within two years. By 1803 there were only 2,400 power looms operating in Britain.

==== Early American mills ====
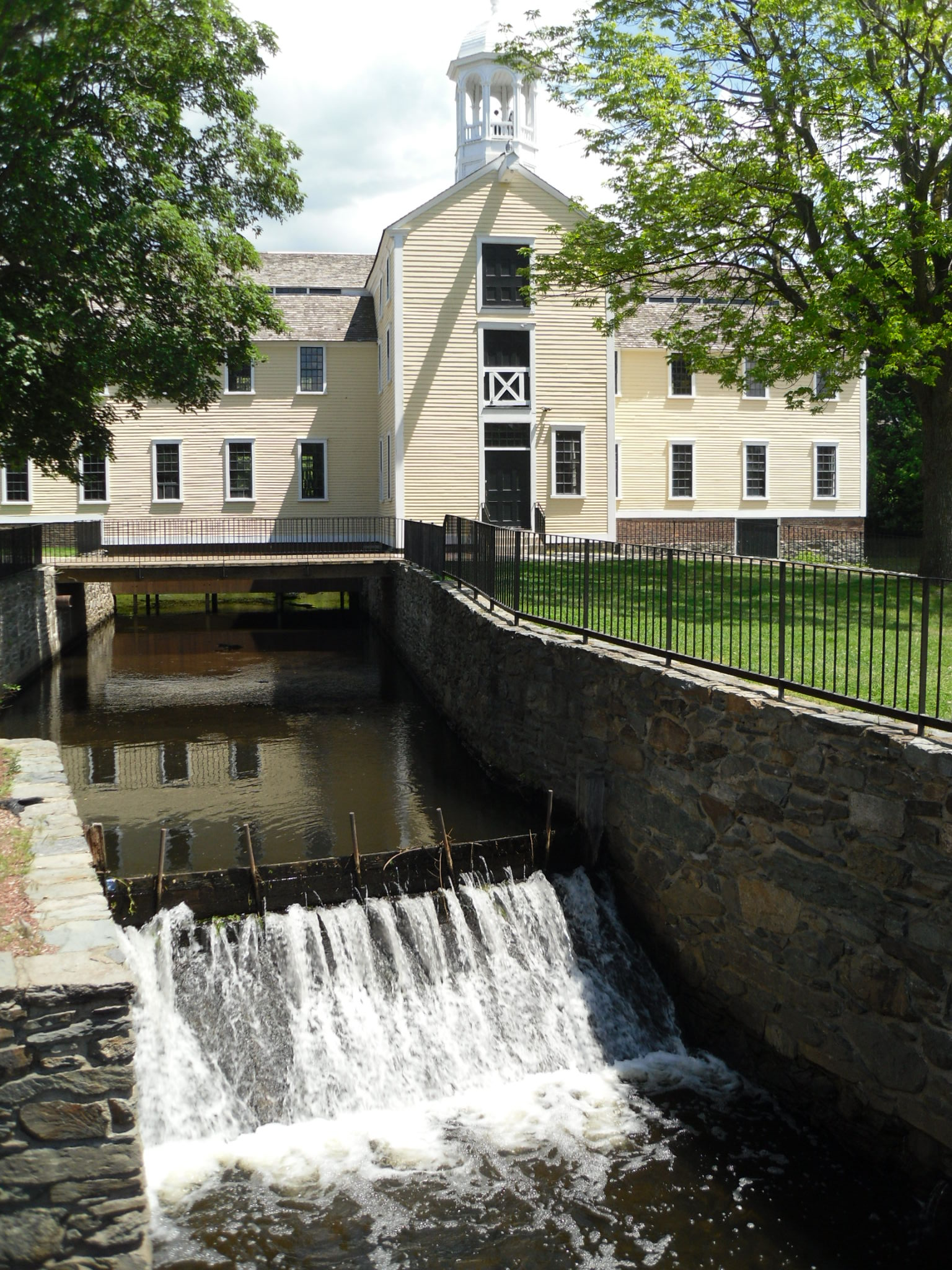
Slater's Mill in Pawtucket, Rhode Island, built in 1790

In the United States, the early horse-powered Beverly Cotton Manufactory was designed by Thomas Somers, who started construction and testing of the facility in 1787, finishing the factory's equipment in 1788. Experience from this factory led Moses Brown of Providence to request the assistance of a person skilled in water-powered spinning. Samuel Slater, an immigrant and trained textile worker from England, accepted Brown's proposal, and assisted with the design and construction of Slater Mill, built in 1790 on the Blackstone River in Pawtucket, Rhode Island. Slater evaded restrictions on emigration put in place to allow England to maintain its monopoly on cotton mills. Slater Mill resembled the Beverly Cotton Manufactory and a mill in Derbyshire in which he had worked.

=== Remodelling and expansion (1815–1855) ===
==== United Kingdom ====
From 1825 the steam engine was able to power larger machines constructed from iron using improved machine tools. Mills from 1825 to 1865 were generally constructed with wooden beamed floors and lath and plaster ceilings. William Fairbairn experimented with cast iron beams and concrete floors. Mills were of red brick or sometimes local stone with a greater attention to decoration and the main gate was often highlighted with stone decoration. The stair columns were exterior to the main floors. During this period the mules got wider and the width of the bays increased. Specialised mill architects appeared.

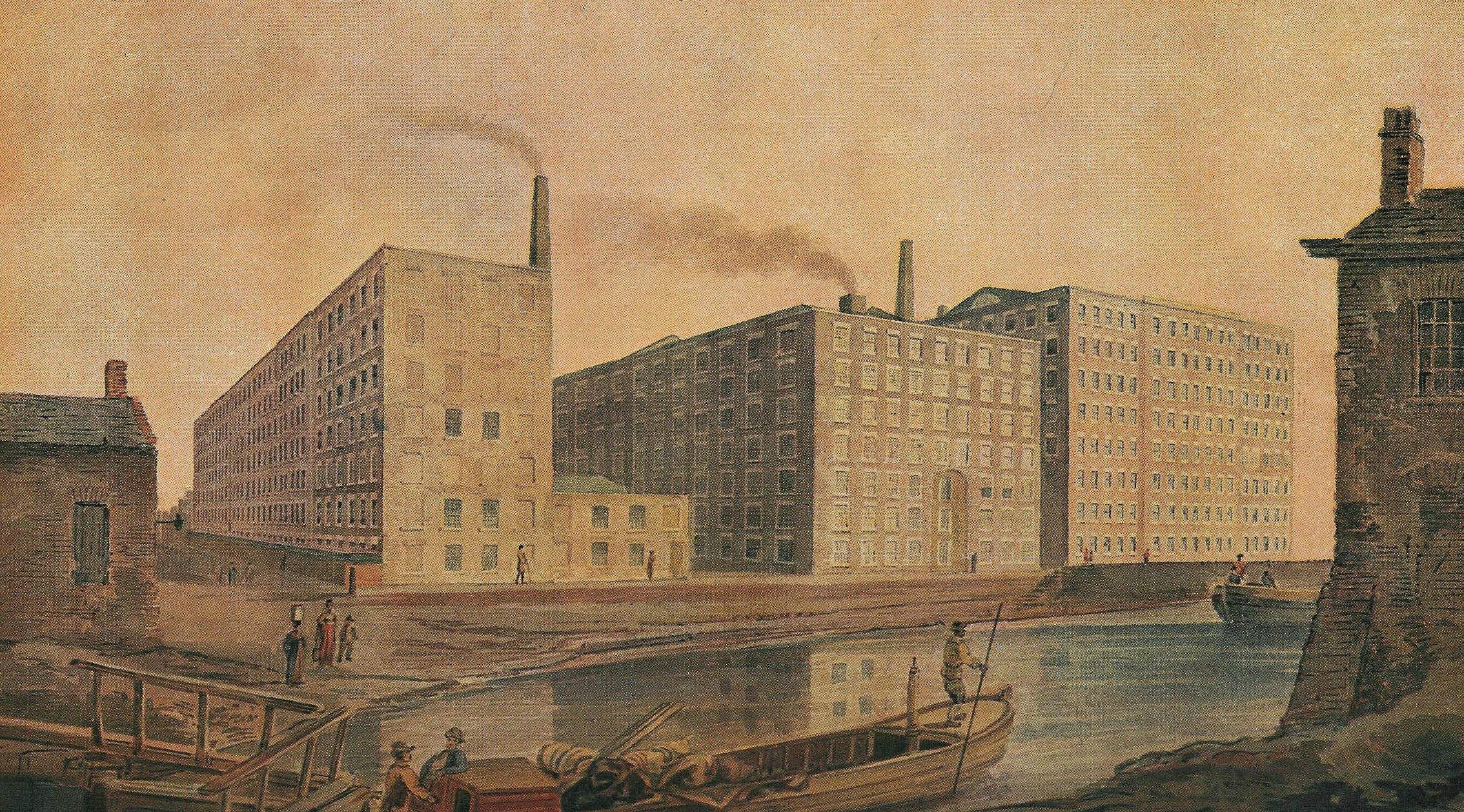
McConnel & Company mills, about 1820

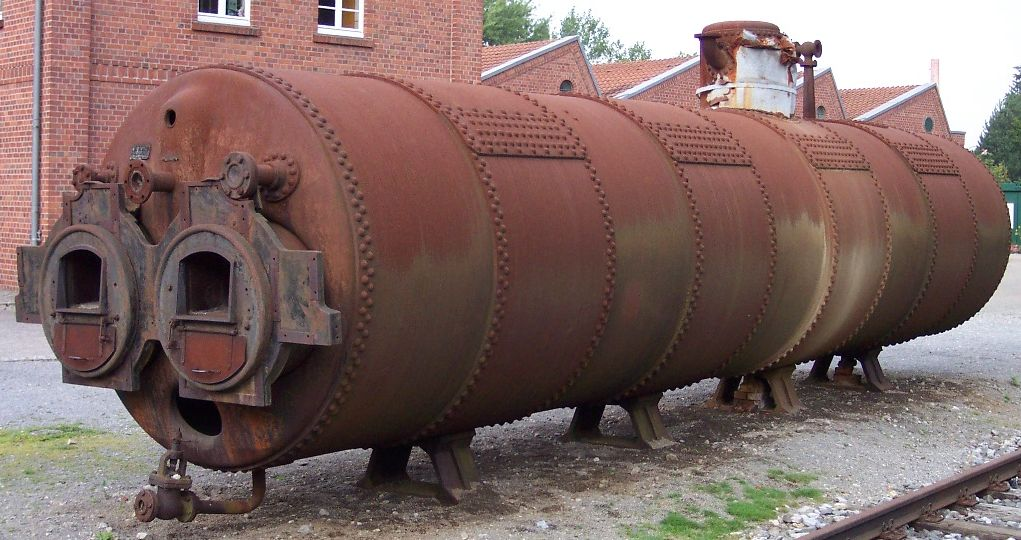
William Fairbairn's Lancashire boiler

Mills of this period were tall, narrow, and wide. They were commonly built with one or two wings to form an 'L' or 'U' shape. Brunswick Mill was a 28-bay mill, 6 storeys of 16 m by 92 m. Each self-acting spinning mule had 500 spindles. Single-storey north light weaving sheds were sometimes added to the mills. The looms caused vibrations that damaged the structure of multi-storey buildings, and specialised weaving mills became common. They were single-storey sheds with an engine house and offices, and preparation and warehousing in a two-storey ancillary building.

Large mills remained the exception during this period. In 1833 the largest mill was that of McConnel and Company in Ancoats, Manchester with 1,545 workers, but in 1841 there were still only 25 mills in Lancashire with 1,000 workers or more, and the number of workers in the average mill was 193.

The Lancashire boiler was patented in 1844, and the economiser in 1845. This can be seen as a square brick structure between the boiler house and the chimney. The engines were double compound upright beam engines of the type patented by McNaught in 1845. Each room in the mill would have line shafts suitable for the type of frame, connected by belt drives or gearing.

In 1860, there were 2650 cotton mills in the Lancashire region, employing 440,000 people. The workers, 90 per cent of whom were adults and 56 per cent females, were paid a total of £11.5 million per annum. The mills used 300,000 hp of power, of which 18,500 was generated by waterpower. The mills had 30,387,467 spindles and 350,000 power looms. The industry imported 1,390,938,752 lb of raw cotton a year. It exported 2,776,218,427 yards of cotton cloth and 197,343,655 pounds (89,513,576 kg) of twist and yarn. The total value of its exports was £32,012,380.

1860 saw the end of this period of rapid growth. The Cotton Famine of 1861–1865 was a period when American long staple cotton became unavailable due to an American Civil War. After the war, the economics of the industry had changed, and a new larger mill was required.

==== United States ====
In 1814 the Boston Manufacturing Company of New England established a "fully integrated" mill on the Charles River at Waltham, Massachusetts. Despite the ban on exporting technology from the UK, one of its proprietors, Francis Cabot Lowell, had travelled to Manchester to study the mill system and memorised some of its details. In the same year, Paul Moody built the first successful power loom in the US. Moody used a system of overhead pulleys and leather belting, rather than bevel gearing, to power his machines. The group devised the Waltham System of working, which was duplicated at Lowell, Massachusetts and several other new cities throughout the state. Mill girls, some as young as ten, were paid less than men, but received a fixed wage for their 73-hour week. They lived in company-owned boarding houses, and attended churches supported by the companies.

In the 1840s George Henry Corliss of Providence, Rhode Island improved the reliability of stationary steam engines. He replaced slide valves with valves that used cams. These Corliss valves were more efficient and more reliable than their predecessors. Initially, steam engines pumped water into a nearby reservoir that powered the water wheel, but were later used as the mill's primary power source. The Corliss valve was adopted in the UK, where in 1868 more than 60 mill engines were fitted with them.

==== India ====
The large steam-powered Bowreath Cotton Mills opened at Fort Gloster near Calcutta by British interests in the 1820s, using British women to impart machine-spinning skills to the local workforce. They closed down in 1837 but reopened with Dwarkanath Tagore as a major shareholder, and by 1840 lay at the centre of a major industrial complex powered by five steam engines, that included a twist mill, foundry and a rum distillery.

=== Golden Age (1855–1898) ===
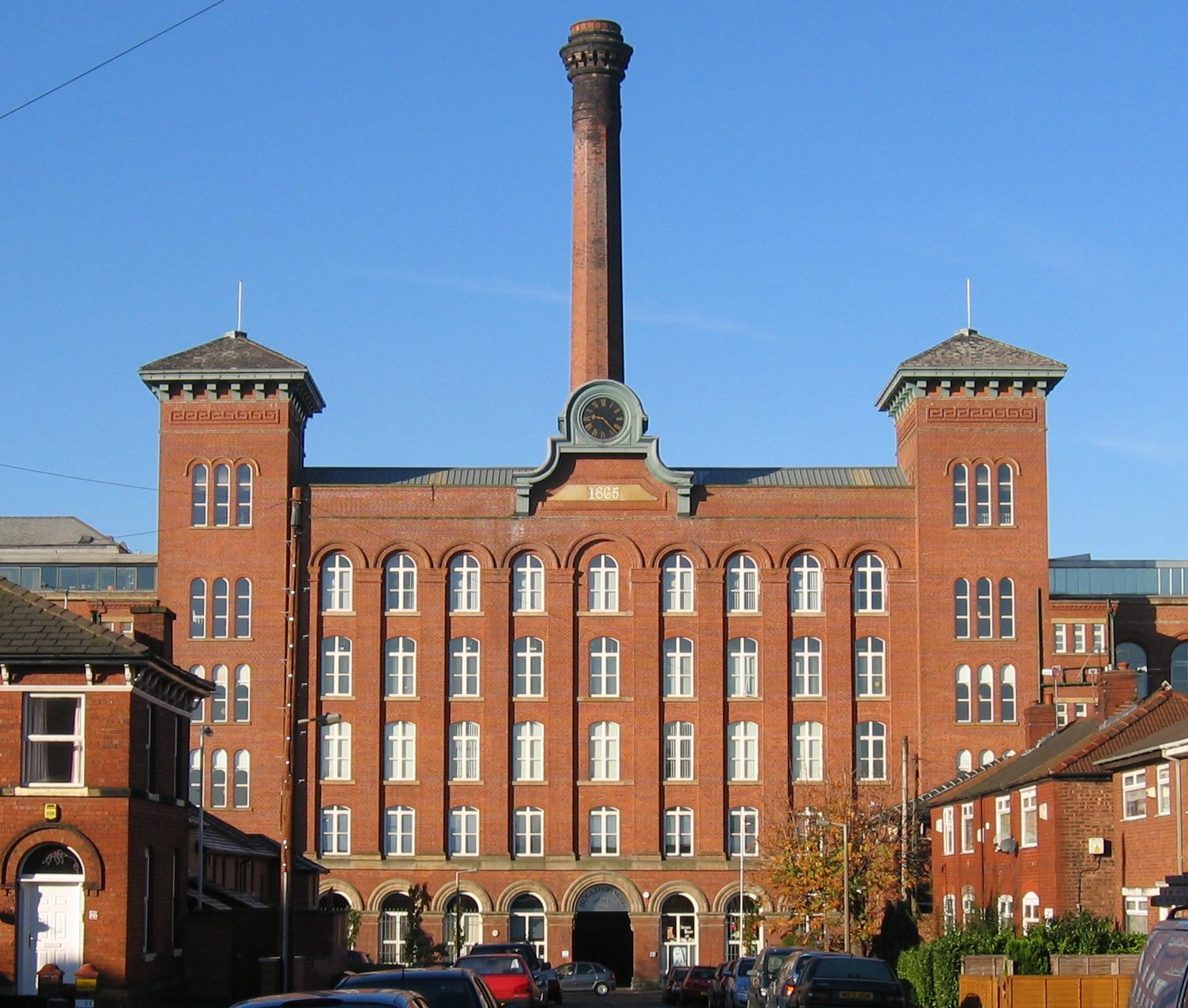
Central office and warehouse block, Houldsworth Mill, Reddish

==== United Kingdom ====
Just before 1870, a mill was built by a joint-stock spinning company and this financial structure led to a new wave of mill construction. The phrase Oldham Limiteds describes these companies. Family-run firms continued to build, but grouped into associations such as the Fine Spinners' and Doublers' Association. Joseph Stott of Oldham perfected a method of fireproof floor construction using steel beams supporting brick vaults that in turn supported concrete floors that would support heavier equipment. Ring frames replaced mule frames; they were heavier and larger and were placed transversely, the floors became larger (up to 130 feet (40 m) wide) and higher to provide light. The bay size in a mill was defined by the positioning of machines. In an 1870 mill the bay was typically 10 feet 6 inches (3.20 m), and the brick vaults 5 feet 3 inches (1.60 m) though there were variations.

Engines were run at higher pressures and from 1875, powered horizontal shafts on each floor by means of ropes. This was a prominent change as a rope race had to be built running the height of the mill. The engine needed more space and the engine house, boiler house and economiser were external to the main mill. Mills continued to get bigger, and were sometimes paired; two mills being driven by one engine. Another change was the trend of having carding on one floor. To achieve this, the ground floor was extended outwards behind the mill often a full mill width. In a single mill, the crosswall divided the blowing room from the rest, as it was here that there was greatest risk of fire.

Mills became wider, Houldsworth Mill, Reddish (1865) was 35 m wide and accommodated 1200 spindle mules. It was of four storeys and had sixteen bays on each side of a central engine house; a double mill. The central block provided offices and warehousing. A mill had a range of ancillary buildings. Stair columns often extending above the mill and housed a water tank for the sprinkler system. The floors were higher allowing for taller windows. Accrington brick was used from 1890, decorated with yellow sandstone with moulded brick and terracotta features. Etched and stained glass was used in the offices. Mills were designed by specialist architects and architectural quality became a major consideration.

The power needed and provided to drive these mills was increasing. Beam engines were installed until the 1870s when horizontal engines took over. Abbey Mill Oldham (1876) needed 700 hp, Nile Mill (1896) needed 2500 hp. By the 1890, boilers produced 160 psi, and the triple expansion horizontals became standard. Chimneys were octagonal.

==== United States ====
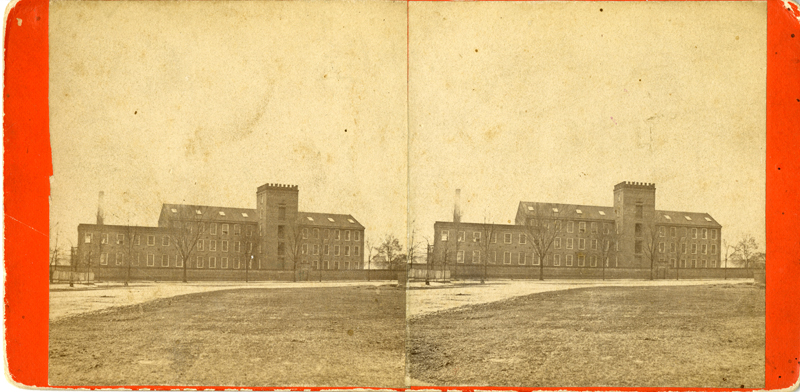
Bibb Company Mill No. 2, Oglethorpe Street, circa 1877, Macon, Georgia

Following the American Civil War, cotton mills were built in the southern states of South Carolina, Alabama, and Mississippi. These mills grew larger as cheap labour and plentiful water power made operations profitable, which meant that the cotton could be processed into fabric where it grew, saving transportation costs. The mills were usually combination mills (spinning and weaving), that were water powered and used a slow burn design technique. They used a belt and pulley drive system, and heavier ring frames rather than mules. At this point they only spun and wove coarse counts. The mills were mainly in open country and mill towns were formed to support them. New England mills found it increasingly difficult to compete, and as in Lancashire, went into gradual decline until bankrupted during the Great Depression. Cotton mills and their owners dominated the economy and politics of the Piedmont well into the 20th century.

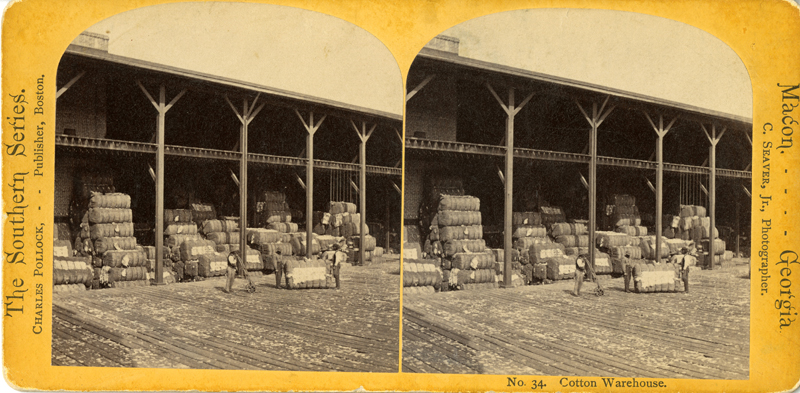
Adams & Bazemore Cotton Warehouse in Macon, Georgia, 1877

==== Asia ====
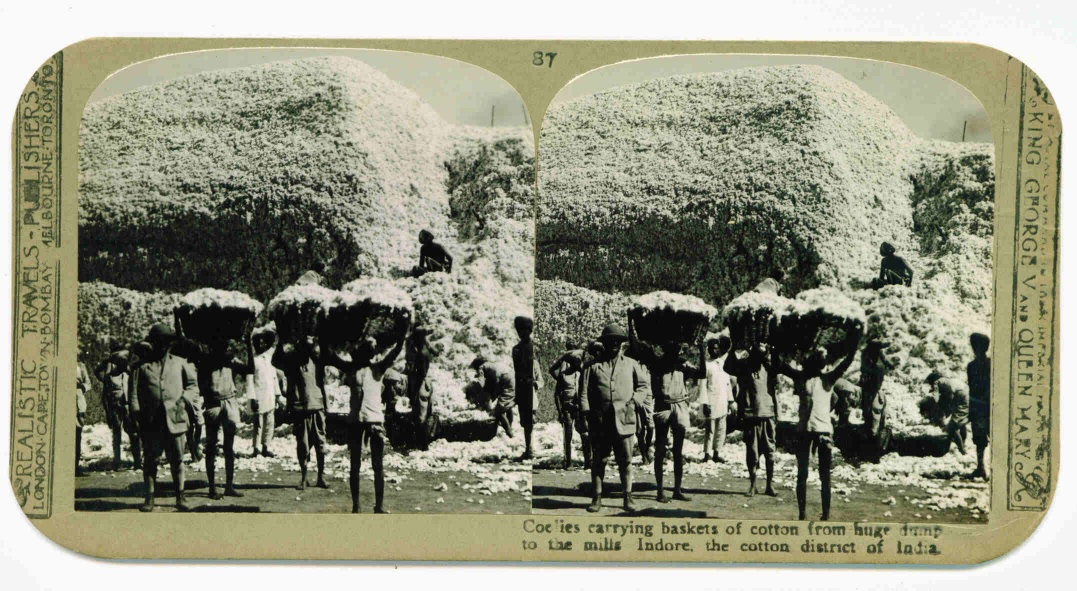
Coolies carrying baskets of cotton from huge dump to the mills; Indore, the cotton district of India, c. 1900

The modern Indian mechanised textile industry was born in 1854, when a steam-powered mill was opened in Bombay by Cowasjee N. Davar. More followed: there were 10 by 1865 and 47 by 1875. By 1880 there were 58 mills in India employing 40,000 workers, with over 80% of them in the cities of Bombay and Ahmedabad. From the 1870's India's own markets for finished yarn and cloth ceased to be dominated by imports from Lancashire, and during the 1870's and 1880 s the Bombay cotton industry began to replace exports of yarn from Britain to China.

=== Edwardian mills (1898–1914) ===
The cotton industry was subject to cycles of boom and slump, which caused waves of mill building. There was an optimism that dictated that slumps had to be endured and then there would be a period of even greater prosperity. The limited companies took control of spinning, while the room and power system was the norm for the weaving sheds. One point of view in the 1880s was that vertically integrating the weaving sheds into new mills would reduce costs and lead to greater profits. This route had been followed in New England, where it was successful, but not in Lancashire. The industry peaked in 1907. There was a severe slump in 1908, which endured until 1918, but the years 1919 and 1920 were more profitable than the peak year of 1907 had been.

==== United Kingdom ====
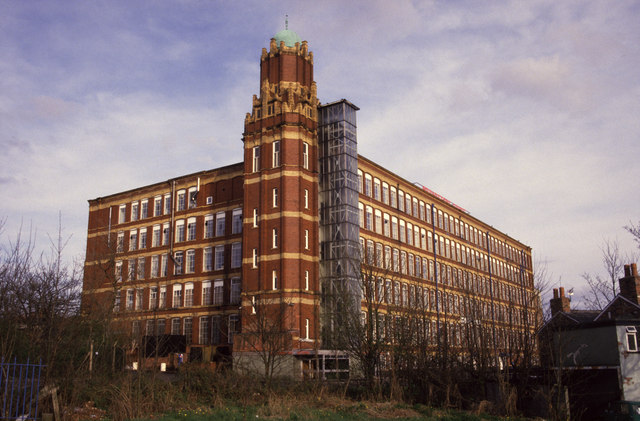
Broadstone Mill, in Reddish, was a large double mill built in 1906.

Production peaked in 1912. The First World War of 1914–1918 put the Lancashire industry into reverse. The British government, starved of raw cotton, established mills in south Asia exporting the spinning technology – which was copied, and became a low-labour cost competitor. In Germany, Flanders and Brazil, mills were built to the designs of the Oldham architects. The only new mills were very large to benefit from the economies of scale. Older mills were re-equipped with rings, and machines were powered by individual electric motors.

Mills of this period were large, their decoration was lavish reflecting Edwardian taste and prosperity. Most mills were built for mules. Kent Mill Chadderton (1908) was a five-storey, 11 bay mill, 84.6m x 43.9m. It had 90,000 spindles. Ring frames were smaller and heavier than mules so the mills were narrower with fewer storeys. Pear Mill Bredbury (1912) was planned to be a 210,000 spindle double mill. Only the first mill was completed, it had 137,000 spindles. They had more stair columns than earlier mills, it had dust flues often built into the rope race. There were two or three windows per bay. Decoration was often in terracotta and the mill name displayed in white brick on the stair tower or chimney. Stott and Sons employed Byzantine styling in Broadstone Mill, Reddish. Specialist architects built new mills and then created extensions. The last steam-powered mill, Elk Mill, was built by Arthur Turner

Mules were built with 1,300 spindles, but were gradually replaced by rings.

The increasingly powerful engines required more boilers with economisers and superheaters. Mills needed reservoirs to supply the boilers and condense the steam. The chimneys were round and taller. Three types of engines were used: triple expansion horizontal cross compound engines, Inverted marine type compounds which were more compact, and Manhattans with vertical and horizontal cylinders such as the 3500 hp engine at New Pear Mill. Rope drives were used exclusively. Electricity was gradually introduced firstly on group drives driving a shaft (Little Mill, 1908), and then later on individual machines.

==== United States ====
Mills constructed in South Carolina increased in size. At Rutledge Ford the Saluda River was dammed and a power plant constructed. It was completed in 1904 before the construction of a state-of-the-art textile mill in 1906. That power plant provided for 4,800 horse power. The mill contained 30,000 spindles. By 1916 a new mill was constructed, containing 70,200 spindles and 1,300 looms. The town was named Ware Shoals. Between 1904 and 1916, the population of Ware Shoals grew from 2 men employed to maintain the newly constructed power plant, to 2,000. By the 1960s the mill employed 5,000 people. It closed in 1985, due to a surge of textile imports that caused a steep decline in the company's output and earnings.

=== Consolidation (1918–50) ===
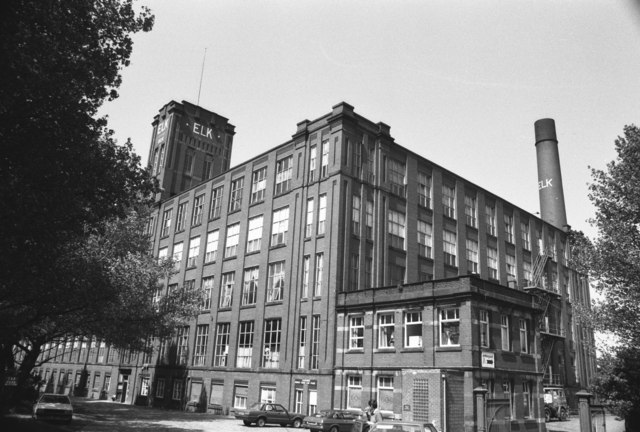
Elk Mill, on the Chadderton-Royton boundary, in Greater Manchester, England

Though business revived in 1919, a shortage of building materials restricted the building of new mills, and activity was financial with the mills seeking recapitalisation. There is no clear concession on the reason for the final decline. Some say that the cotton men concentrated on making easy money ignoring the possibility of foreign competition best countered by larger mills by re-equipping the mills with more modern ring frames. Daniels and Jewkes argued the fundamental cause of the depression was a change in demand for cotton goods. J. M. Keynes suggested that there was over capacity, and the industry should be reorganised into larger units that would scrap the excess capacity.

The Lancashire Cotton Corporation was a company set up by the Bank of England in 1929, to rescue the Lancashire spinning industry by means of consolidation. In merged 105 companies, ending up in 1950 with 53 operating mills. These were the later larger mills. It was bought up by Courtaulds in August 1964.

The later mills were on the fringe of the spinning area in Wigan and Stockport, Availability of labour was cited as a reason. The last mills were completed in 1927, these were Holden Mill (Astley Bridge Mill) and Elk Mill.

In 1929, for the first time there were more spindles in the USA than in the UK. In 1972, India had greater spindleage than the US, and it was in turn surpassed by China in 1977.

=== Cotton mills in the late 20th century (1950–2000) ===
==== Decline of spinning in England ====
Though there was a slight revival after 1945, mills closed. The most efficient mills had abandoned their steam engines, and were working the frames with individual electric motors. Broadstone Mills Stockport, was built as a double mill with 265,000 mule spindles, but by 1959 it was running 37,500 mule spindles and 70,000 ring spindles. It closed in 1959 taking advantage of the Cotton Industry Act 1959 and was then used by the John Myers mail order company. One mill was later demolished leaving the other to be used as a Shopping Outlet Centre and Craft Village. The reduction of capacity led to a legacy of redundant mills, which were readily reused for other industrial purposes.

Ring spinning technology had successfully replaced the spinning mule, with mills having been converted mules to rings. However, in the 1970s, the depleted industry was challenged by a new technology open-end or break spinning. In 1978 Carrington Viyella opened a factory to do open-end spinning in Atherton. This was the first new textile production facility in Lancashire since 1929. Immediately Pear Mill, Stockport and Alder Mill, Leigh were closed. These were both Edwardian mills designed by Stott and Sons. The mill built in 1978 was built on the Howe Bridge mills site and was named Unit One. It was not an open end mill but a combed cotton ring mill.

=== Modern cotton mills ===
Modern spinning mills are mainly built around open end spinning techniques using rotors or ring spinning techniques using spindles. In 2009 there were 202,979,000 ring spinning spindles installed worldwide, with 82% of these being in Asia or Oceania and 44% being within China. In the same year there were 7,975,000 open end spinning rotors installed, with 44% of these being within Asia or Oceania and 29% within Eastern Europe. The average age of installed rotors is much lower than that of spindles and as rotors are between 7 and 10 times more productive they are responsible for 20% of the cotton spun worldwide.

Modern cotton mills are increasingly automated. One large mill in Virginia in the United States employs 140 workers in 2013 to produce an output that would have required more than 2,000 workers in 1980.

== Locations ==
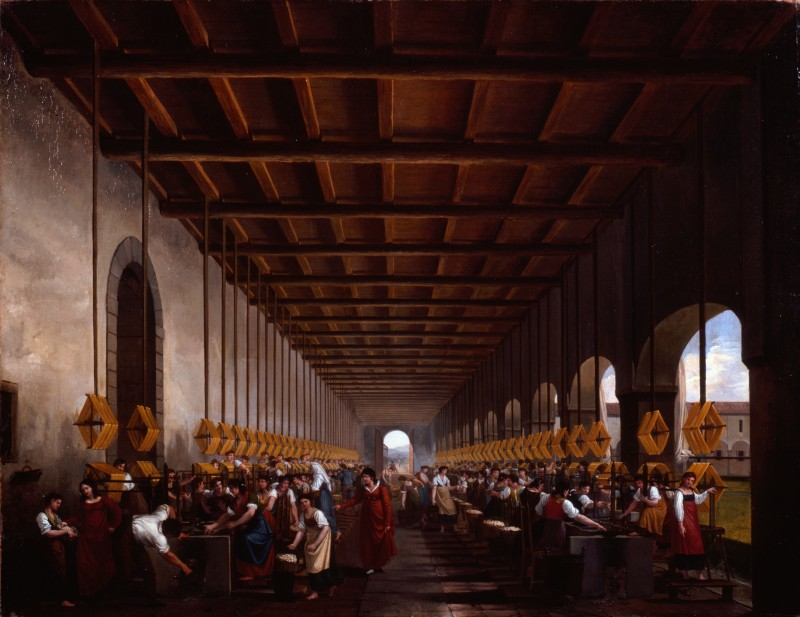
Spinning mill in the Bergamo area, Italy (c. 1825–1830), by Pietro Ronzoni

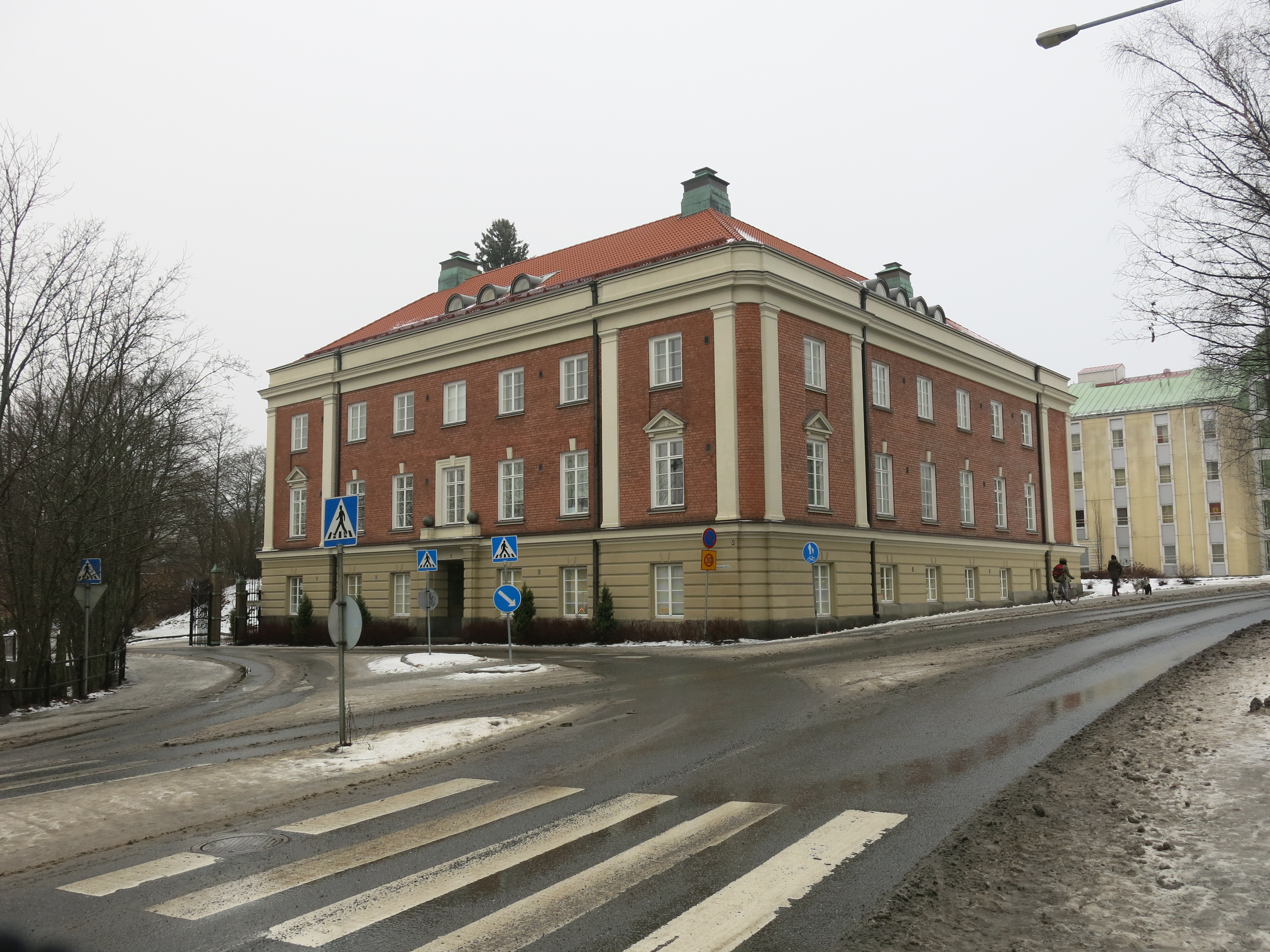
The office building of former cotton mill in Lapinniemi, Tampere, Finland

Cotton mills were not confined to Lancashire but were built in northeast Cheshire, Derbyshire, Nottingham, the West Riding of Yorkshire, Bristol, Durham and the west of Scotland. The availability of streams or rivers to provide power determined the location of the early mills some of which were in isolated areas. In Lancashire they were built on the rivers and streams descending from the Pennines and Rossendale moorland. In some places quite small streams powered a string of small mills such as in the Cheesden Valley between Ramsbottom and Heywood. where 14 mills and their associated leats and ponds were concentrated along a four-mile stretch of the brook. Mills were built around Rochdale and Littleborough. North of Bury, ten mills occupied a mile long stretch of a stream in the Shuttleworth Valley. Other mills were built north of the River Ribble and a cluster of five mills in Caton near the port at Lancaster, one of which belonged to Samuel Greg who built Quarry Bank Mill at Styal in Cheshire. Not all water-powered mills were in rural areas, after 1780 mills were built in Blackburn and Burnley.

In Scotland, four cotton mills were built in Rothsay on the Isle of Bute using labour that had experience of the linen industry. By 1800 there were two water-powered mills at Gatehouse of Fleet employing 200 children and 100 adults. Robert Owen who had worked for Peter Drinkwater in Manchester, developed the mills at New Lanark built by his father-in-law, David Dale under licence from Arkwright.

Cotton Mills in 1860
	Lancashire	Cheshire	Derbyshire
Mills	1920	200	25
Workers	310000	38000	12000

== Architecture ==
=== Fireproof construction ===
Cotton mills were huge fire risks, since cotton fibres in the air could form an explosive mixture in their gas-lit interiors. The first mills using fireproof construction were built in Shropshire and Derbyshire in the 1790s and Philips & Lee's mill built in Salford in 1801–2. Fireproofing took the form of cast iron columns and beams from which sprang jack arches that were infilled with ash or sand and covered with stone flags or floorboards. In some mills timber was also eliminated from the roof structure which was supported by cast or wrought iron trusses. Until the properties of cast iron were properly understood some mills constructed using the early technology collapsed. In Manchester extensive testing of cast iron as a structural material was carried out by Eaton Hodgkinson and William Fairbairn in the early 1820s. Fireproof construction was expensive and timber, sometimes clad in plaster or metal continued to be used throughout the 19th century. Rolled steel beams and reinforced concrete flooring was introduced in a limited way in the 1880s but not widely adopted in Lancashire mills until the 20th century.

=== Other factors ===
Cotton is sensitive to temperature and humidity. Heating systems used wrought iron pipes suspended at a height of 7 feet (2.1 m) to carry steam under pressure. In summer the system was barely used but in winter the boilers would be fired up two hours before the shift started to warm up the mill. As heat was applied the humidity dropped and system of humidifiers, either atomisers which played an air jet against a jet of water or ones that injected a stream/air mixture into the room.

Early fire fighting systems used sprinklers supplied by water captured on flat roofs in shallow tanks. Later mills had a water tank at the top of the stair tower. Water for the sprinklers had to be protected from freezing and evaporation. Water pressure needed to be above 7 psi, and the header tank at least 15 feet (4.6 m) above the highest sprinkler. The provision of light, water tanks and heating system defined the structure and shape of the mill.

== Machinery ==
=== Power ===
The earliest cotton mills were driven by water, so needed to be situated on fast flowing streams. From about 1820, the stationary steam engine became the normal form of power for a cotton mill, water was still needed to produce the steam and to condense it, to maintain the humidity, for many of the finishing processes and for firefighting. Water was extracted from rivers and canals, then later mills requiring ever more water, built and maintained their own reservoirs.

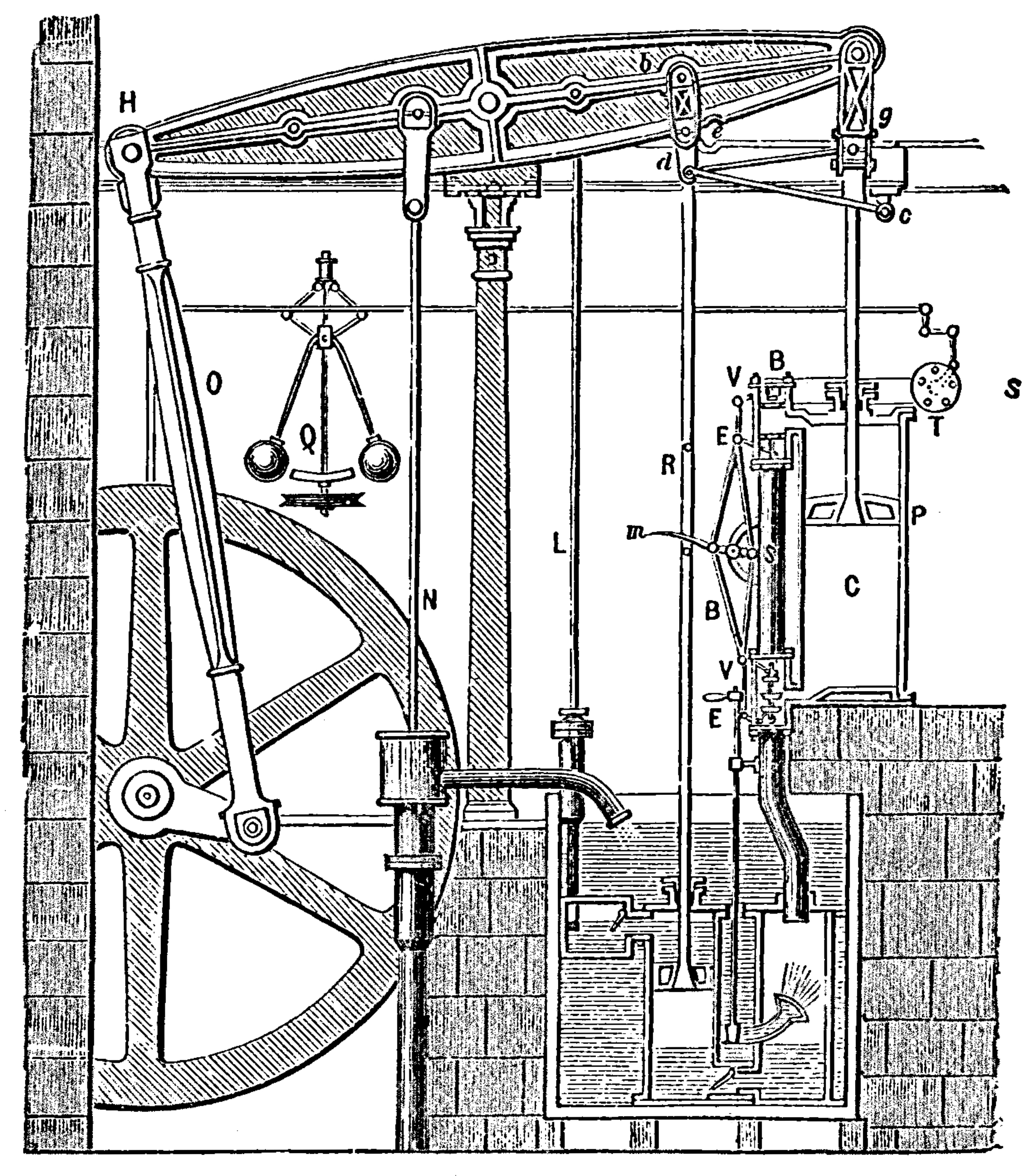
Boulton and Watt engine 1784

In 1781 James Watt marketed a rotary-motion steam engine that could be adapted to drive all sorts of machinery, Richard Arkwright pioneered its use in his cotton mills. Possibly the first steam engine to be used in a cotton mill was a Newcomen engine which was used at Shudehill Mill in 1783 to raise water between storage ponds so it could drive a water wheel. By 1795 most similar engines around Manchester had been replaced by Boulton and Watt or Bateman and Sherratt engines.

Electricity was introduced in 1877. Steam engines drove generators to provide electric lighting. By the 1890s this was common. Electricity was used to drive the mills machinery by 1906. It was generated in the engine house, and one group-drive electric motor was placed on each floor to drive the shafts. Generators were placed exterior to the mill as it was thought that they were a fire risk. Mains driven mills started about 1907. Later mills used individual electric motors to power the machinery.

=== Transmission ===
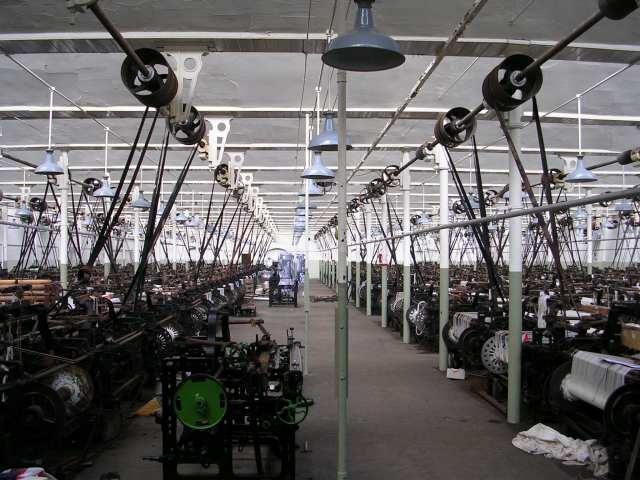
A weaving shed, showing how all the looms were powered from overhead shafts

The early mills had a vertical shaft to take the power from the flywheel. On each floor horizontal shafts engaged with the main shaft using bevel gearing. American mills used thick leather belts instead of shafts. A new approach was to use thick cotton ropes. A rope drum was attached to the flywheel with a channel cut for each rope. The profile was such to give maximum adherence.

=== Spinning ===
A spinning mill opened raw cotton bales and cleaned the cotton in the blowing room. The cotton staples are carded into lap and straightened and drawn into roving which is spun using either a mule or ring frame. The yarn can be doubled and processed into thread, or prepared for weaving.

Minerva Mill, Ashton-under-Lyne was designed by P. S. Stott and equipped by John Hetherington and Son, it produced 40's twists and 65 wefts. It was typical of a mill of the 1890s.

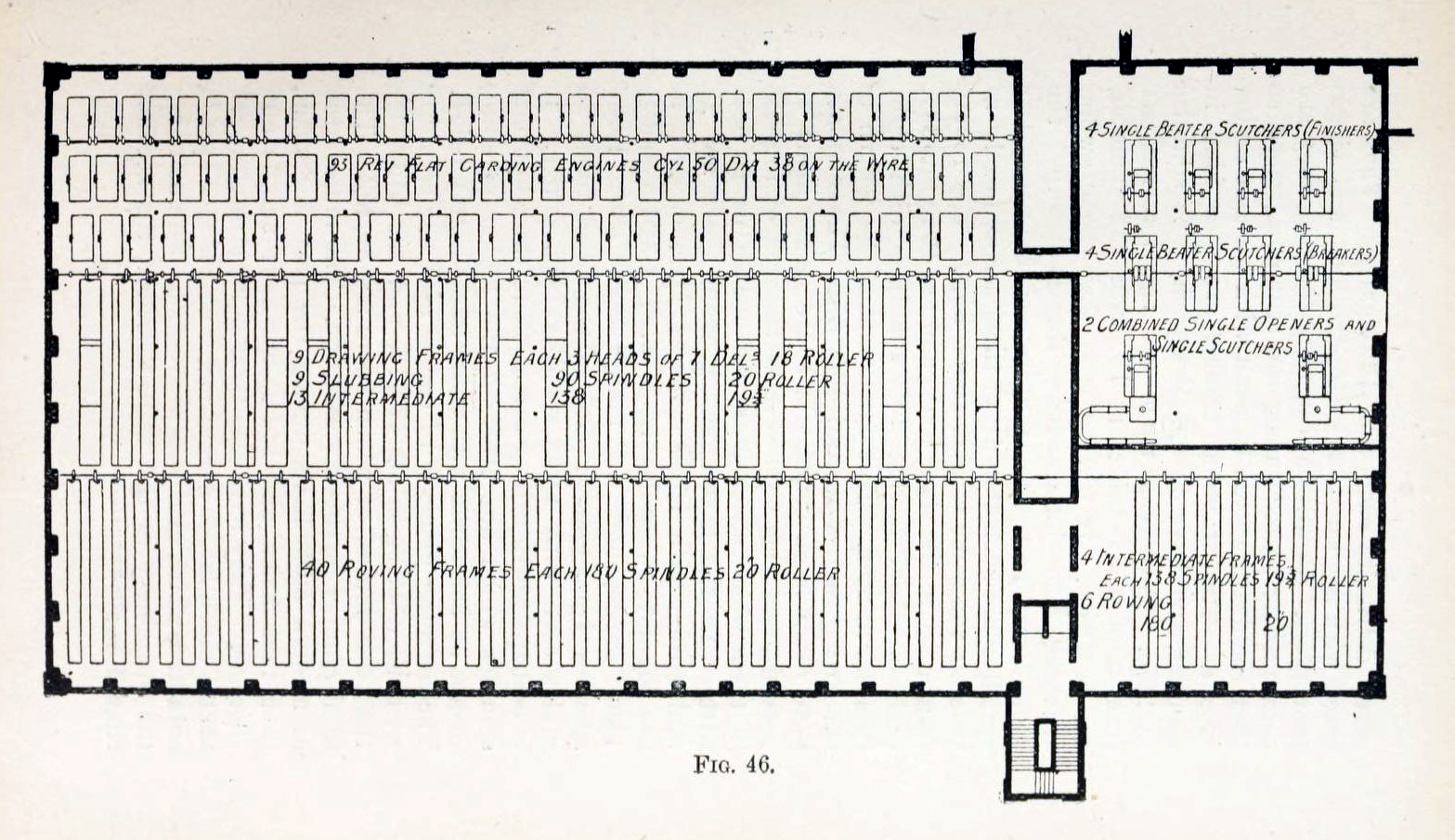
Minerva mill (1895)

Number	Machines	Ratio
2	Vertical Openers and scutchers	1 : 43,434
4	Intermediate Scutchers	1 :21,717
93	Carding Engines	1 :934
63	finishing deliveries of drawing	1 :1,380
792	Slubbing spindles	1 :109.7
1716	Intermediate spindles	1 :50.6
6680	Roving spindles	1 :13
86,868	Mule spindles	1 :1

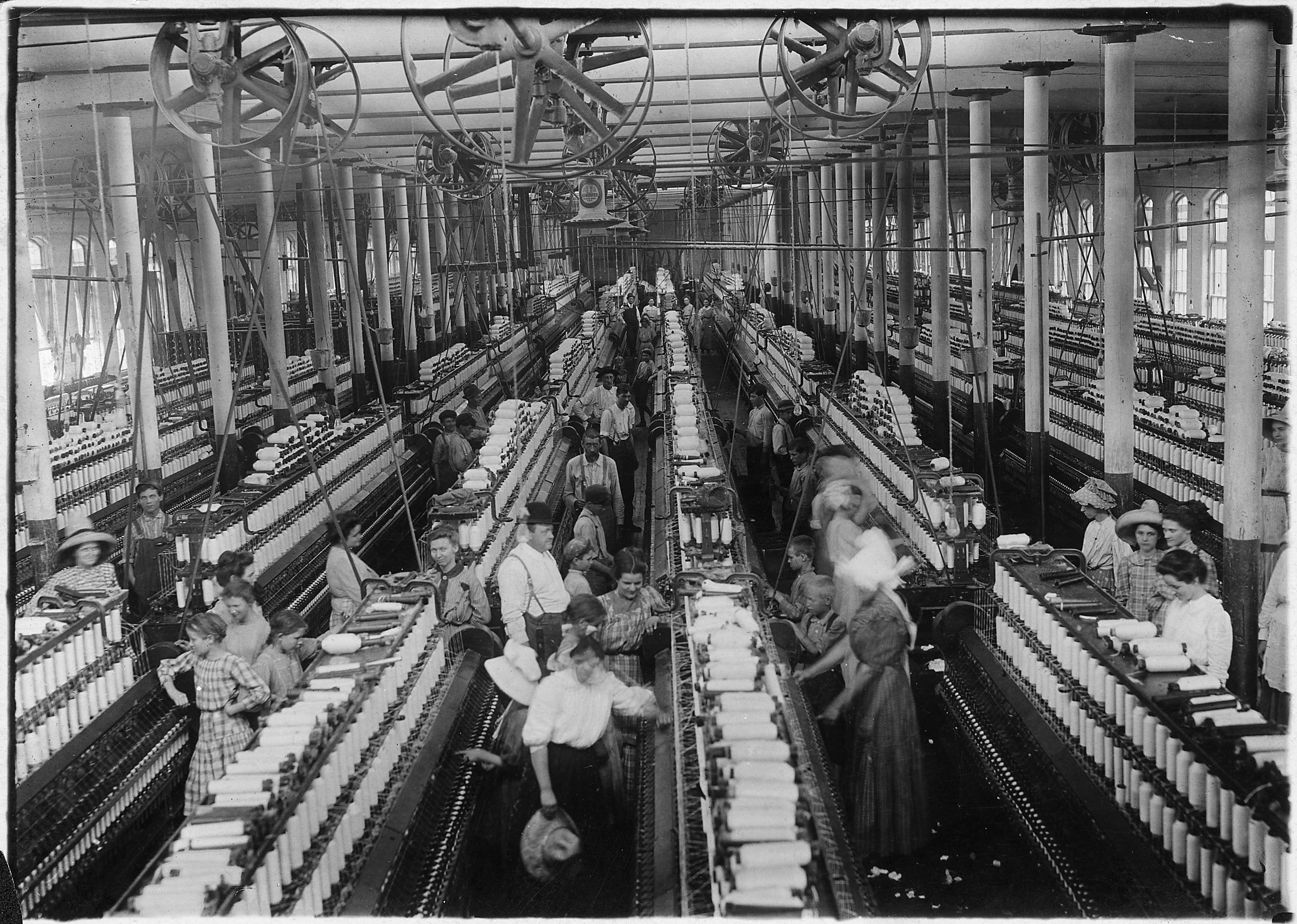
Interior of Magnolia Cotton Mills spinning room

Self acting mule frame (Roberts 1830) was an improvement on Crompton's Mule (1779) which derived from earlier inventions. Mules were used in the 19th century mills for the finest counts, these needed skilled workers to operate them.

Ring frame (1929) developed out of the Throstle frame (19th century) an improvement on the Arkwright's Water frame. Originally rings were only suitable for coarse counts, they were lower and heavier than mules so needed stronger floors but lower rooms. Over time, rings became suitable for finer counts and because of cheaper labour costs they replaced mules. By 1950 all mills had converted to the Ring frame. The Hawk mill in Shaw near Oldham was still operating cotton mule frames in 1964/65.

=== Weaving ===
A weaving mill needed yarn suitable for the warp and the weft. The warp had to delivered on the beam, or was wound on the beam from cheeses by a beamer. To obtain the extra strength needed, the yarn was sized on a sizer. The weft was wound onto the pirns for the shuttle on a pirner. These preparatory processes completed the yarn was woven on a loom. One weaver would operate 4 or six looms. A self-acting loom would stop when any thread broke, and the thread had to be retied or pieced. The process required greater levels of light than spinning, and weaving sheds would often be single storey, with overhead north facing lights. Placing a loom onto the ground also reduced the problems caused by the vibrations of operation.

The Cartwright's powerloom (1785) was made reliable by Robert's cast iron power loom (1822) and became perfected by the Kenworthy and Bullough Lancashire Loom (1854). The Northrop or Draper Loom (1895) replaced these older designs.

Number of power looms in Britain 1803–57, and 1926
Year	1803	1820	1829	1833	1857	-	1926
No. of Power Looms in UK	2,400	14,650	55,500	100,000	250,000		767,500

Comparison of output of 24 yard shirtings 1823–33
Year	1823	1823	1826	1833
	good hand loom weaver	power weaver	power weaver	power weaver
	Aged 25	Aged 15	Aged 15	Aged 15 with 12yr old helper
Looms	1	2	2	4
Pieces woven per week	2	7	12	18

== Labour conditions ==
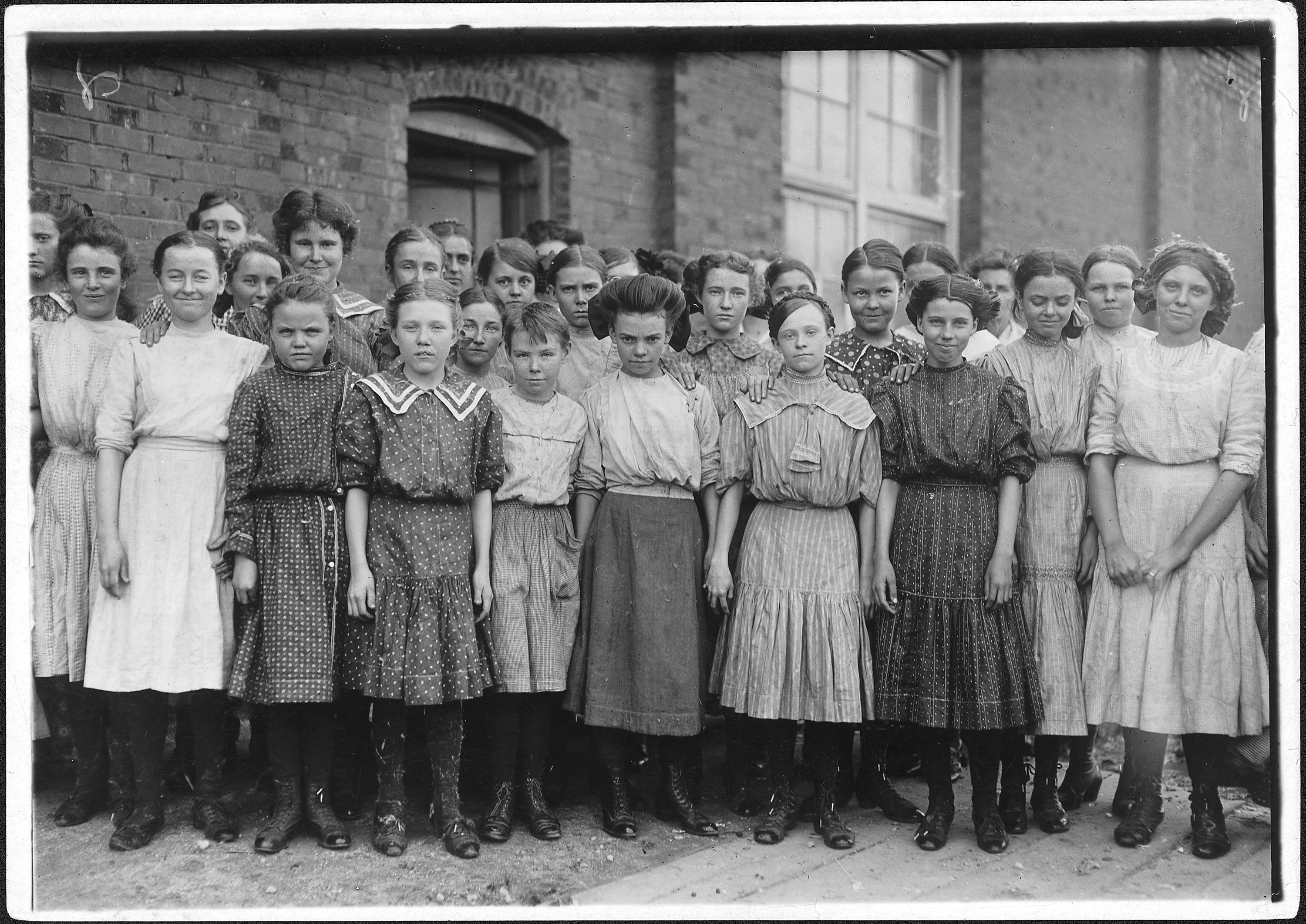
Some of the spinners in a cotton mill, Alabama, 1910

The mills were notable in employing women, giving them an independent income. In Lancashire and Piedmont, South Carolina child labour is well documented.

=== Child labour in the United Kingdom ===
The Lancashire and Derbyshire mills needed a pool of cheap labour. Pauper children were boys and girls between the ages of 7 and 21, who were dependent on the Poor Law guardians. Mill owners made contracts with the guardians in London and the southern counties to supply them paupers, in batches of 50 or more, to be apprenticed. Living condition were poor in 'Prentice Houses', and the children who were paid 2d a day worked 15-hour shifts, hot bedding with children on the other shift.

Robert Owen was a millowner in New Lanark. He never employed children under the age of ten, and opposed physical punishment in schools and factories. He lobbied for parliamentary action, resulting in the Health and Morals of Apprentices Act 1802.

- Hours of work limited to twelve a day
- Boys and girls to sleep in separate dormitories with no more than two to each bed
- Compulsory education to be provided in the arts of reading writing and arithmetic
- Each apprentice to be provided with two suits of clothes
- On Sunday children to be instructed in Christian worship
- Sanitation to be improved

Regulation was ineffective until the mills were subject to inspection in 1833 with the establishment of a factory inspectorate consisting of four factory inspectors who had the power of magistrates. This did not reduce the number of children, half-timers worked mornings in the mill and spend the afternoon in the school room. While the number of children working in spinning as tenters did decline, more were employed in weaving because weavers were expected to tenter extra looms.

Percentage of children below 13 in cotton factories 1835–78
Year	1835	1838	1847	1850	1856	1862	1867	1870	1874	1878
amount	13.2	4.7	5.8	4.6	6.5	8.8	10.4	9.6	14.0	12.8

From the Factory Act 1844, until 1878 records do not distinguish between full-time and half-times. In 1851 a sizeable number of children were working the mills. For Example, In Glossop, there were 931 children (out of 3562) between 5 and thirteen working in cotton mills. In one mill in 1859, 50.2% of the workforce were women, 24.2% were girls, 19% were men and 6.6% were boys.

=== Child labor in the United States ===
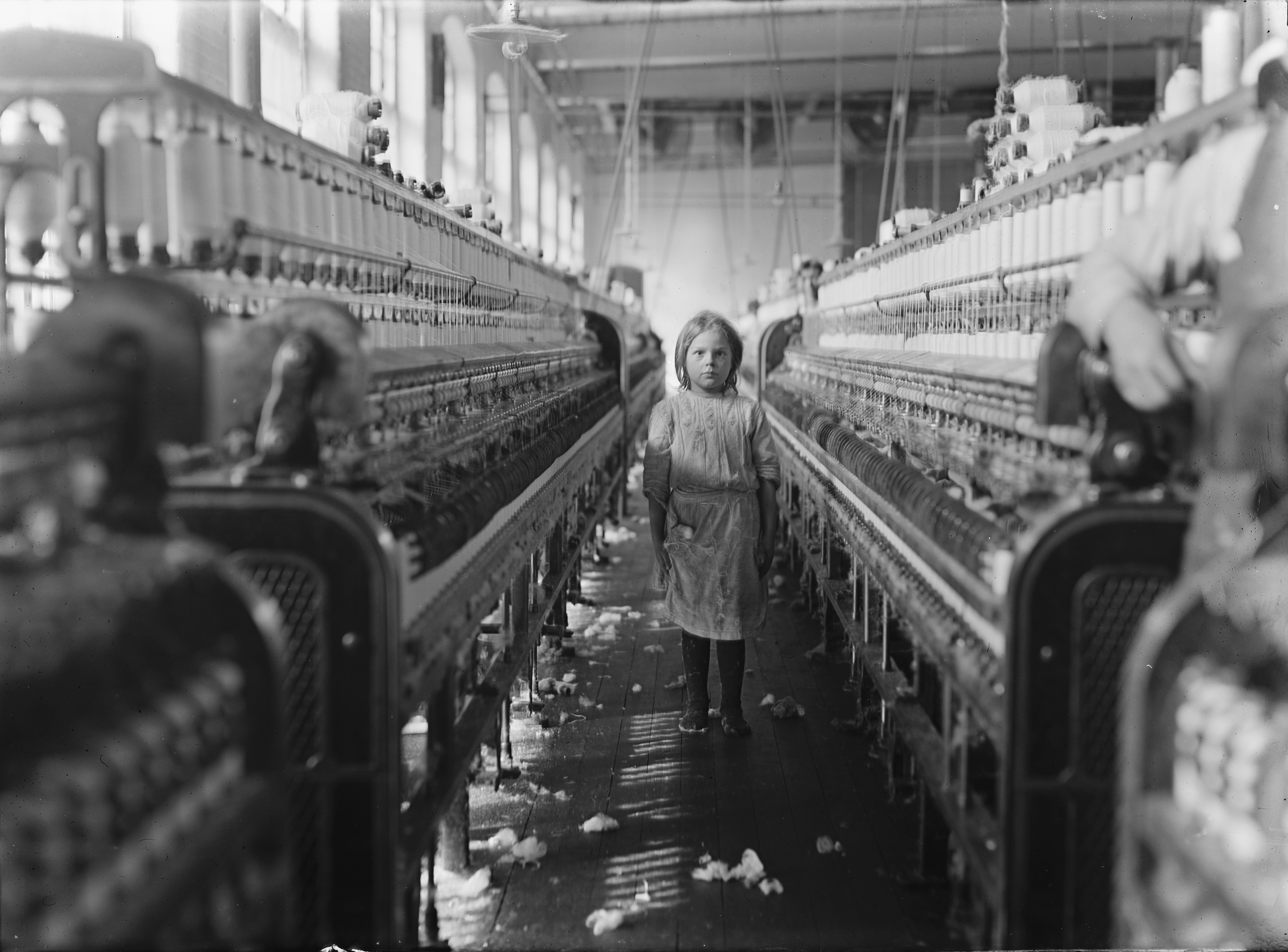
A little spinner in the Mollahan Mills, Newberry, South Carolina. She was tending her 'sides' like a veteran, but after I took the photo, the overseer came up and said in an apologetic tone that was pathetic, 'She just happened in.' Then a moment later he repeated the information. The mills appear to be full of youngsters that 'just happened in,' or 'are helping sister.' December 3, 1908. Witness Sara R. Hine. Location: Newberry, South Carolina".

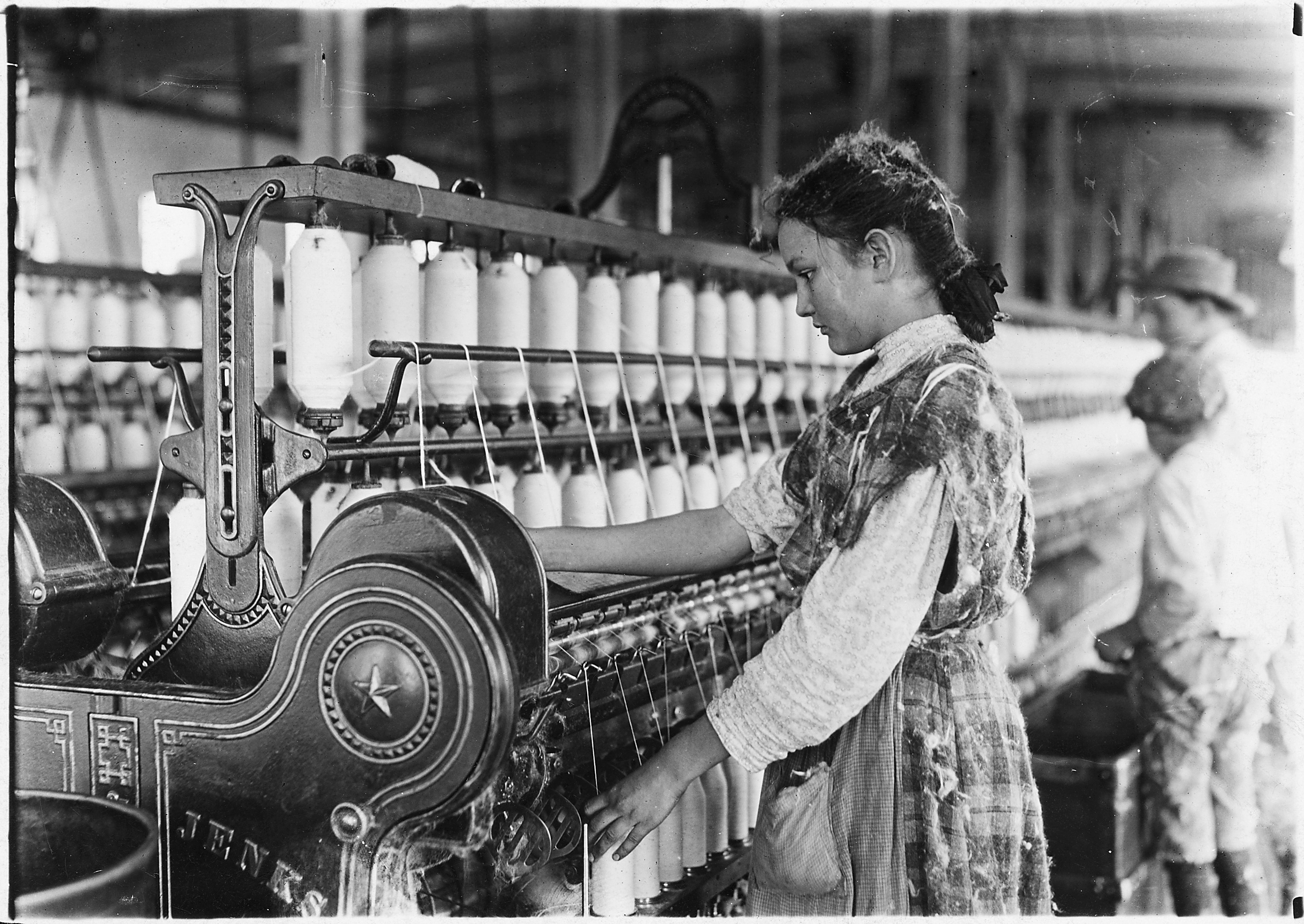
Cotton mill workers in Cherryville, North Carolina, 1908. Periodic labour shortages led to the hiring of child labour in the United States and other countries. Had black workers been allowed in the cotton mills of the American South at this time, young workers would not have been necessary.

The Carolinas mills developed from 1880, and would employ children in preference to adults. At Newton Mill, North Carolina, in 1909, twenty of the 150 workers observed, appeared to be twelve years old or less. As well as the usual report of hands and fingers getting severed by the machinery and insufferable heat, the dust inhaled caused a fatal condition known as brown lung. Laws were rarely enforced, and the presence of small children in the factory was explained away to the inspectors saying they were visiting the mill to bring meals to their parents (meal totters), or helping but not on the payroll (helpers). Wages were good for the workers who could earn $2 a day in the mill against $0.75 on a farm. In the segregated south, 'Blacks' were not allowed to work inside a mill; had they been the need for child labour would have been eliminated. Child labour stopped here not only because of new laws but the change in the type of machinery caused by the Great Depression, which required greater height and skill.

=== Women ===
In 1926 when it was at its peak, the Lancashire cotton industry worked 57.3 million spindles and 767,500 looms. It imported 3.3 million bales and exported 80% of its production. 61% of the 575,000 cotton operatives in Lancashire were women, of which 61% were unionised in 167 different unions

=== Unions ===
The 18th-century woollen industry of small producers in southern England was far different from the Yorkshire-based worsted industry where the clothier imported and owned the raw material and sold the cloth. He put out work to small weavers, in effect, employing them. Worsted was more capital intensive. The small weavers banded together to form self-help guilds. When Lancashire adopted cotton, the same process occurred. But in Lancashire cotton mills, spinning became a male occupation, and the tradition of unions passed into the factory. As spinners were 'assisted' by several 'piecers' there was a pool of trained labour to replace any spinner the owner cared to dismiss. The well paid mule spinners were the 'barefoot aristocrats' of labour and became organised in the 19th century. They paid union dues, and were well placed to finance themselves should a strike be needed. The Yorkshire worsted industry, adopted the ring frame which required less skill. Worsted spinning was an occupation for young girls. Unionism did not develop in Yorkshire until 1914. In, 1913 figures show 50% of cotton operatives were unionised while only 10% of wool and worsted workers.

In Lancashire there were:

Occupation	Union members
Weavers	182,000
Cardroom Operatives	55,000
Spinners	23,000
Piecers	25,000

The spinners union, the Amalgamated Association of Operative Cotton Spinners had a federal structure with strong central leadership where control was in the hands of a small group of paid officials. Their dues were high, so the fighting fund was large and the officials were skilled in defending the complex wage structures.

== Health of the workers ==
A cotton mill was not a healthy place to work. The air in the mill had to be hot and humid to prevent the thread from breaking: 18 °C to 26 °C and 85% humidity was normal. The air in the mill was thick with cotton dust, which could lead to byssinosis – a lung disease.

Protective masks were introduced after the war, but few workers wore them as they made them uncomfortable in the stifling conditions. The same applied to ear protectors. The air led to skin infections, eye infections, bronchitis and tuberculosis. The noise levels in a weaving shop, where the shuttles in 500 plus looms were being thumped 200 times a minute led to levels of deafness in all who worked there. The lubrication was carcinogenic and led to cancers of the mouth and cancer of the scrotum; known as mule-spinners cancer.

A mill worker could expect to work a thirteen-hour day, six days a week with two weeks off for the wakes week holidays in summer. Unsurprisingly, a series of Factory Acts were passed to attempt to ameliorate these conditions.

In the early days when the cotton towns were expanding rapidly, living conditions for the workers were poor. Badly planned housing was seriously overcrowded. Open sewers and shared privies led to diseases such as cholera; Manchester was hit by an epidemic in 1831 that claimed hundreds of lives.

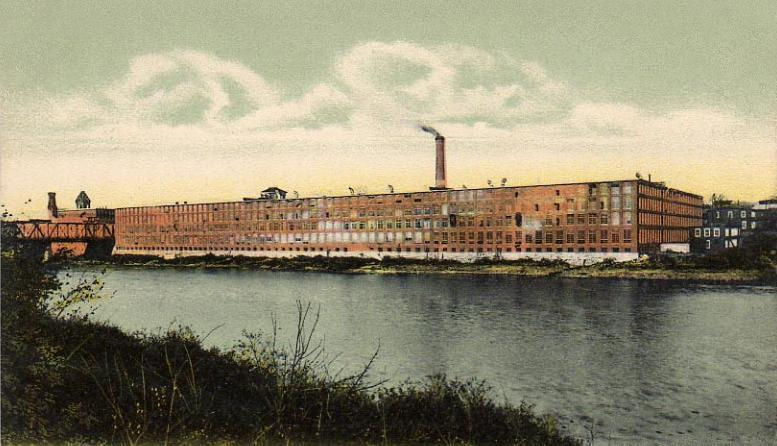
Print Works c. 1906 at the Amoskeag Manufacturing Company, Manchester, New Hampshire

== Art and literature ==
- William Blake: "And did those feet in ancient time" (1804 poem — "dark satanic mills")
- Mrs Gaskell : Mary Barton (1848 novel), North and South (1855 novel)
- L. S. Lowry: Coming from the Mill (1930 oil painting)
- Charles Sheeler

== See also ==
- Cotton famine
- Cottonopolis
- Like a Family: The Making of a Southern Cotton Mill World (book)
- Stott, cotton mill architects
- Textile manufacturing
- Water frame
