= Cumbria Way =

70-mile footpath in Cumbria, England

- Waymarker and logo
- Length: 112 km (70 mi)
- Location: Cumbria, England
- Established: 1970s
- Trailheads: Ulverston; Carlisle
- Use: Hiking
- Elevation gain/loss: 2,973 m (9,754 ft)
- Highest point: High Pike, 658 m (2,159 ft)
- Difficulty: Challenging
- Season: All year
- Waymark: Name on green disc
- Website: www.cumbriawaywalk.info
Trail map

The Cumbria Way is a linear 112-kilometre (70-mile) long-distance footpath in Cumbria, England. The majority of the route is inside the boundaries of the Lake District National Park. Linking the two historic Cumbrian towns of Ulverston and Carlisle, it passes through the towns of Coniston and Keswick. The route cuts through Lakeland country via Coniston Water, Langdale, Borrowdale, Derwent Water, Skiddaw Forest and Caldbeck. It is a primarily low-level route with some high-level exposed sections.

== History ==
The Cumbria Way was originally devised in the 1970s by local Ramblers Association members. The waymarking of the entire route was completed by volunteers and national park staff in May 2007.

== Route ==
The route can be walked in either direction but is described here as south to north beginning at the trailhead of Ulverston and ending in Carlisle.

=== Stage 1: Ulverston to Coniston ===
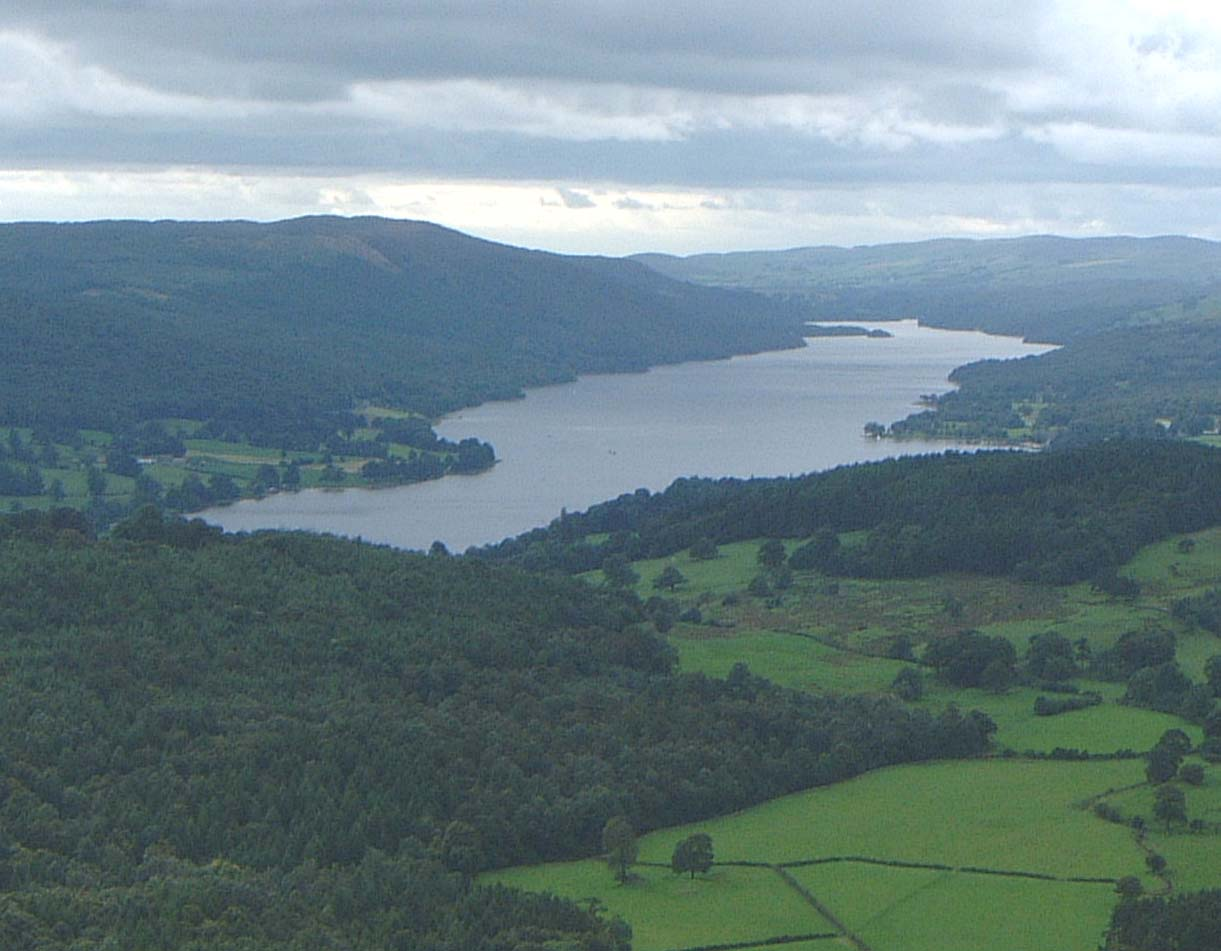
Coniston Water seen from the North

The route leaves the urban area of Ulverston, birthplace of Stan Laurel, and heads north towards the village of Gawthwaite and the boundary of the Lake District National Park. The trail, which consists primarily of field paths at this stage, leads to the settlement of Sunny Bank and the shore of Coniston Water, the western shoreline of which is followed before reaching the settlement of Coniston. Grizedale Forest is visible to the east of the lake with Coniston Old Man and Dow Crag being visible to the west on approach to Coniston. This stage is approximately 24 km (15 mi) in length.

=== Stage 2: Coniston to Langdale ===
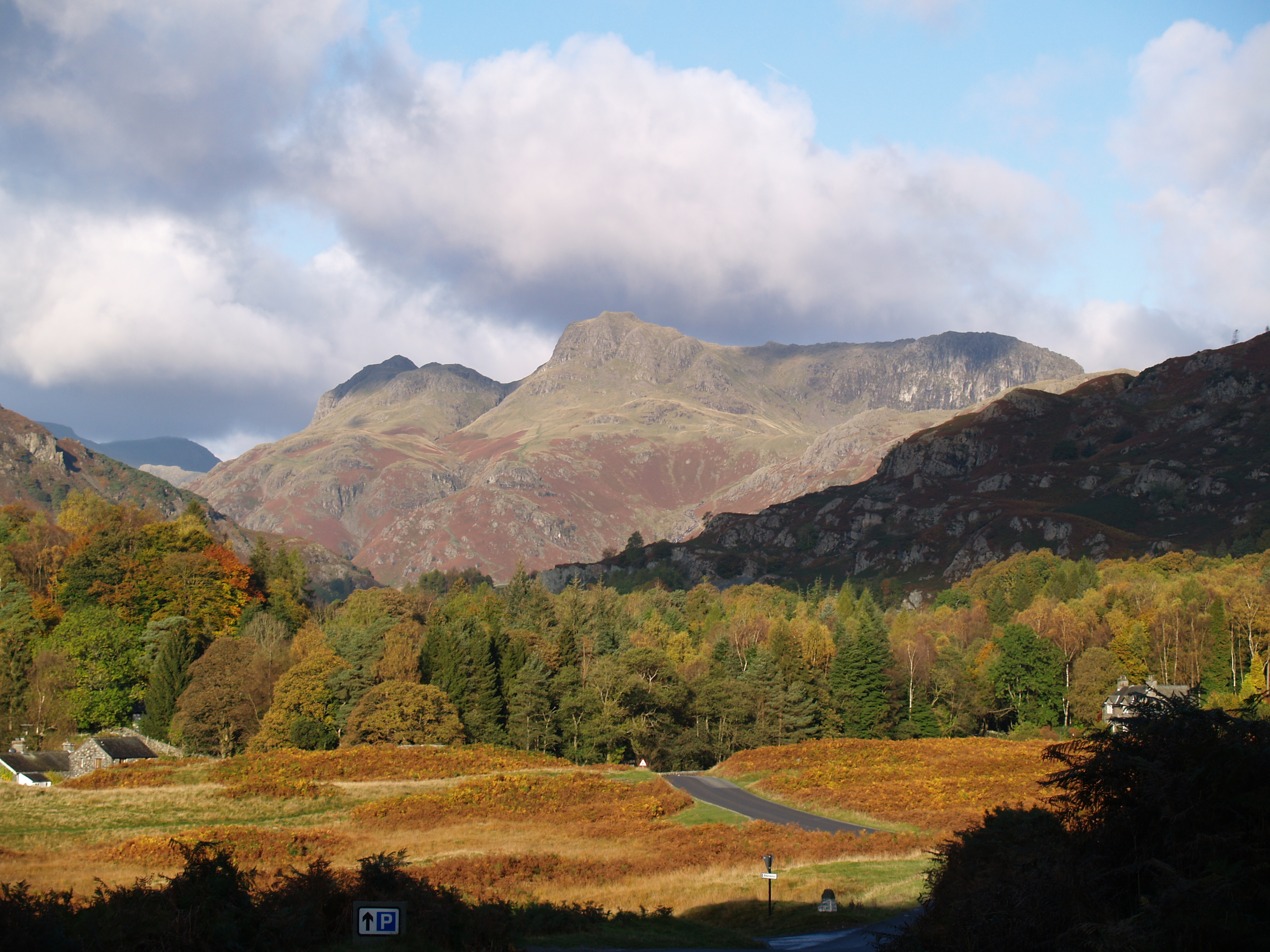
Langdale Pikes

The route leaves Coniston heading in a NNW direction through woodland towards Tarn Hows. The way involves some road walking as it passes through the villages of Colwith and Skelwith Bridge. The Langdale Pikes soon become visible as the route leaves Skelwith Bridge in a NNE direction, passing Elter Water before entering the Great Langdale valley. This stage is approximately 17.5 km (11 mi) in length.

=== Stage 3: Langdale to Keswick ===
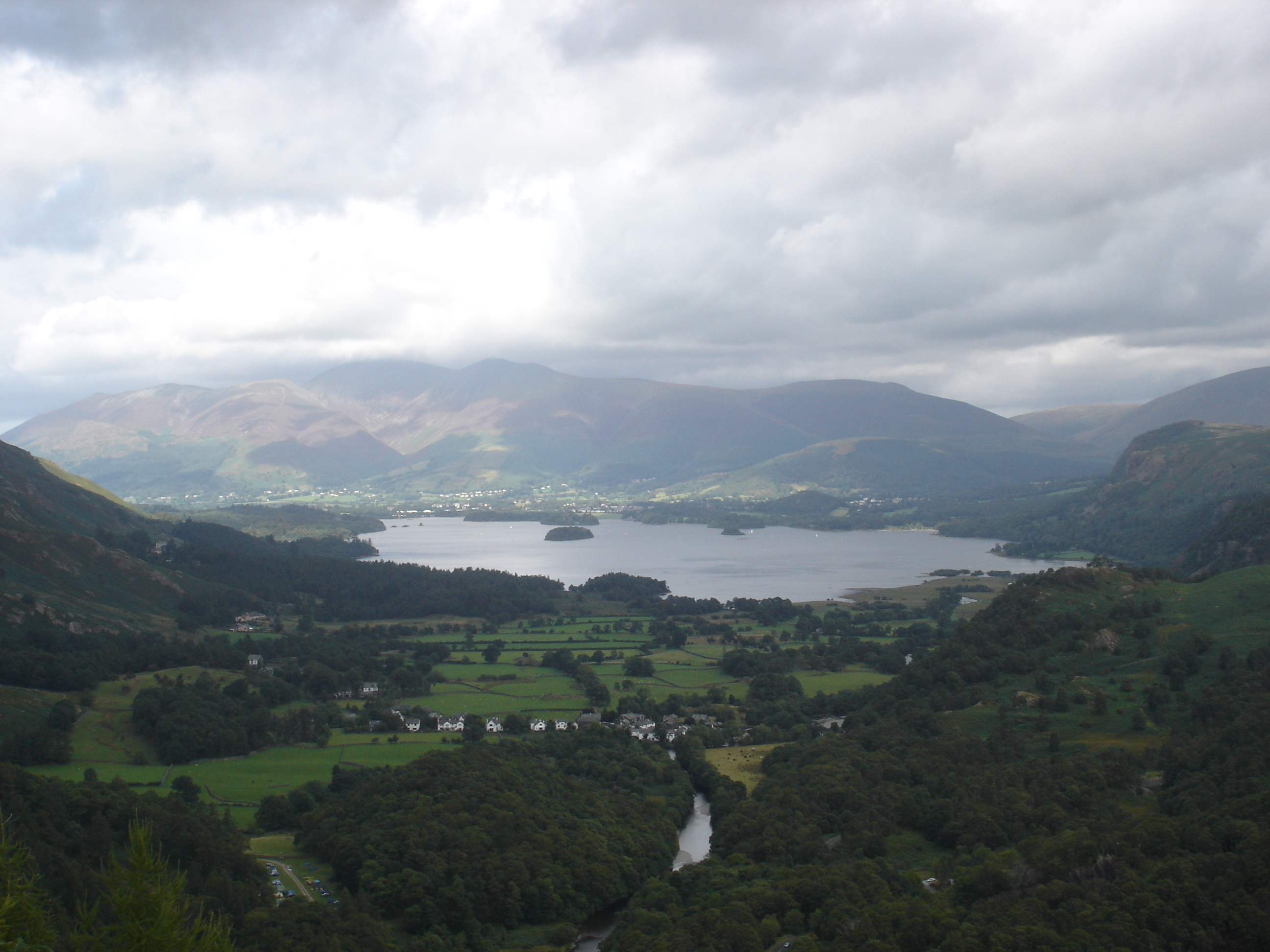
Derwent Water seen from Castle Crag

The route leaves Langdale and travels alongside Mickleden beck, with the mountain of Bow Fell to the west and Langdale Pikes to the east. After a significant gain in elevation the route crosses Stake Pass before descending via Langstrath beck and turning towards the villages of Stonethwaite and Rosthwaite. The route subsequently follows the River Derwent before reaching Derwent Water where it follows the shoreline path to reach the town of Keswick. The mountains Skiddaw and Blencathra may be visible to the north. This stage is approximately 24 km (15 mi) in length.

=== Stage 4: Keswick to Caldbeck ===
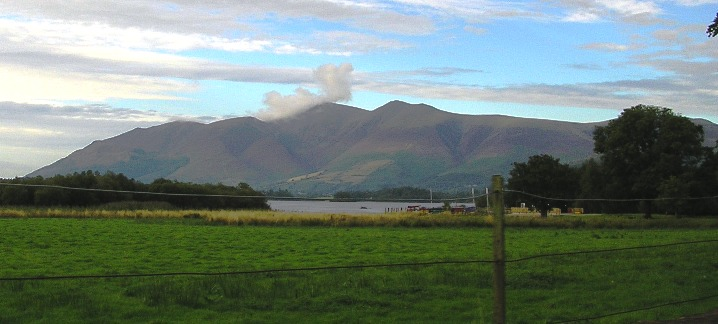
Skiddaw seen from Borrowdale

After some urban walking on the exit from Keswick, the route crosses the A591 road before ascending past Latrigg into the Skiddaw Group SSSI towards Skiddaw House Youth Hostel. After crossing the area of fells known as Back o'Skiddaw the route passes High Pike and the Caldbeck Fells before leaving the SSSI and descending towards the village of Caldbeck. This stage is approximately 22.5 km (14 mi) in length.

=== Stage 5: Caldbeck to Carlisle ===
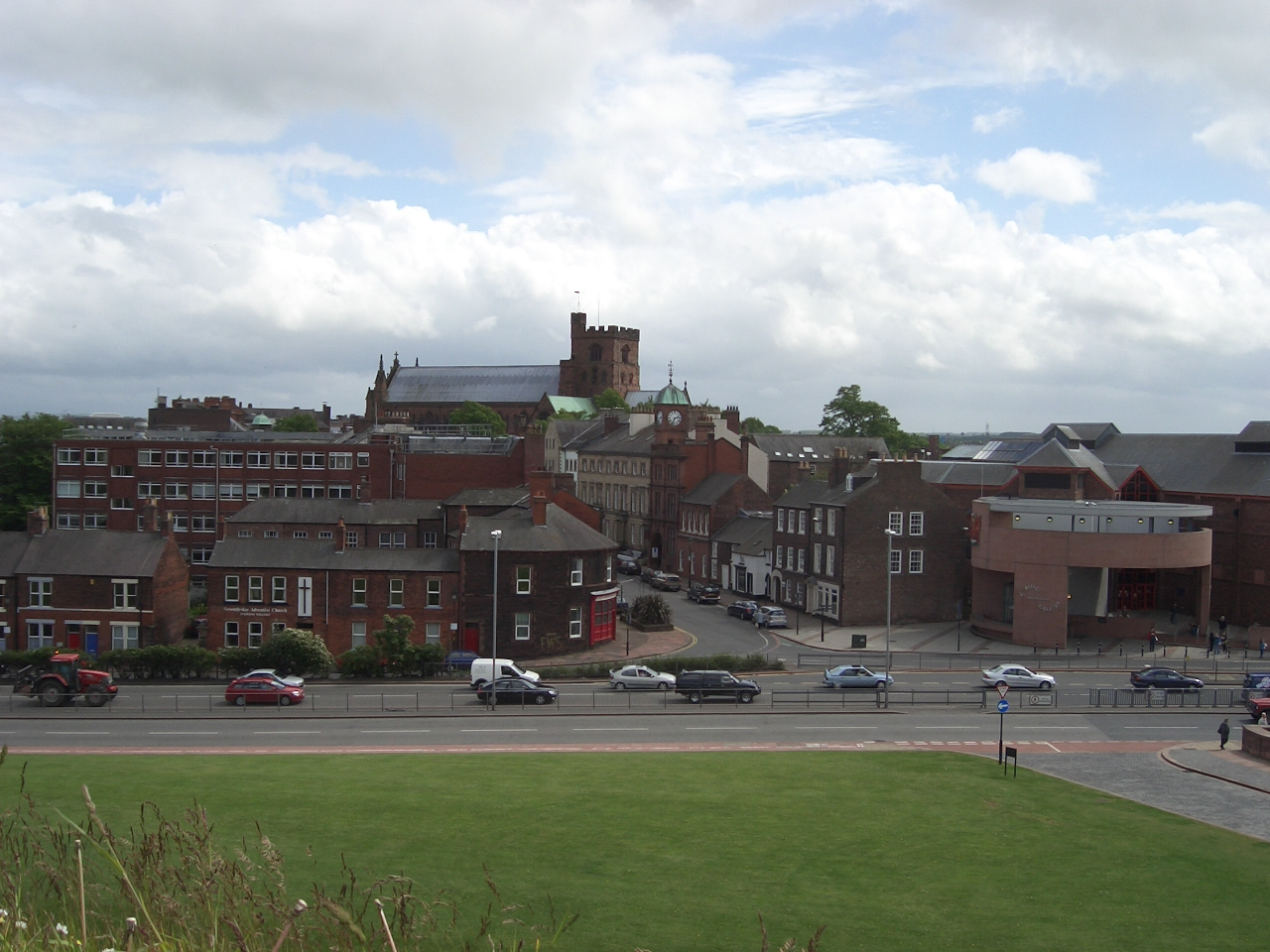
Carlisle

After leaving the village of Caldbeck this final low-level section of the route follows the course of the River Caldew to the city of Carlisle, Cumbria's county town. The route passes through the villages of Sebergham, Buckabank and Dalston primarily following woodland and farmland public footpaths and bridleways. This stage is approximately 24 km (15 mi) in length.

== Geology and biology ==
=== Flora and fauna ===
The tarns encountered on the route provide a habitat for a wide range of species including vendace, charr, crayfish and schelly.

The red squirrel can be found in woodland encountered on the route.

The high precipitation in the ancient woodland encountered throughout the route provides a favourable habitat for mosses, liverworts, ferns and lichens. The boggy areas encountered, particularly on the high-level parts of the route, provide a habitat for carnivorous plants including sundew and butterwort.

== Connecting trails ==
The route connects with the Allerdale Ramble, Cumbria Coastal Way, Coast to Coast Walk, Hadrian's wall path, Cistercian Way, Eden Way and Windermere Way.
