= Cowen (surname) =

Cowen (/kaʊɪn/) or Cowan is a surname of Irish origin.

Cowen can also be an Anglicized spelling of the Jewish surname Cohen.

Notable people with the surname include:

- Abigail Cowen, American actress and model
- Agnes Cowen (1927–1999), Cherokee politician
- Barry Cowen (born 1967), Irish politician, son of Bernard Cowen
- Bernard Cowen (1932–1984), Irish politician, father of Brian and Barry Cowen
- Brian Cowen (born 1960), Irish Taoiseach, former Minister for Finance and Leader of the Fianna Fáil party, son of Bernard Cowen
- Elise Cowen (1933–1962), American Beat poet
- Frederic Hymen Cowen (1852–1935), British pianist, conductor, and composer
- Joseph Cowen (1829–1900), English politician and journalist
- Lenore Cowen (born c. 1968), American mathematician and computer scientist
- Lillie Cowen (1850–1939), Jewish-Irish writer and Hebrew translator
- Lionel Cowen (1846–1895), English painter
- Philip Cowen (1853–1943), Jewish-American newspaper publisher and immigration official
- Robert Cowen (born 1930), Judge for the U.S. Court of Appeals for the Third Circuit
- Scott Cowen (born 1946), president of Tulane University
- Tyler Cowen (born 1962), American economist
- Zelman Cowen (1919–2011), former Governor-General of Australia
- Pete Cowen (born 1951), English golf coach

== See also ==
- Cowan (surname)
- Cowens
