= Unthank, Dalston =

Village in Cumbria, England

Coordinates: 54.826°N 2.941°W

Unthank
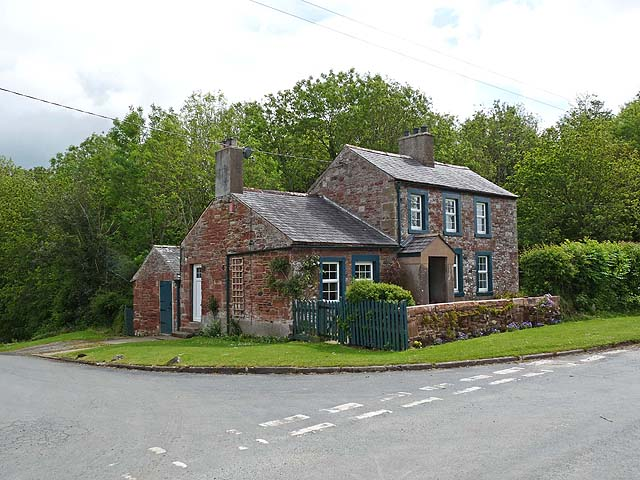
- Cottage at Unthank

- Location in the former district of Carlisle, Cumbria Location within Cumbria
- OS grid reference: NY395483
- Civil parish: Dalston
- Unitary authority: Cumberland
- Ceremonial county: Cumbria
- Region: North West
- Country: England
- Sovereign state: United Kingdom
- Post town: CARLISLE
- Postcode district: CA5
- Dialling code: 01228
- Police: Cumbria
- Fire: Cumbria
- Ambulance: North West
- UK Parliament: Carlisle

Unthank is a village near Dalston in Cumbria, England. It is first mentioned in writing in 1332.
