= Shudehill Mill =

Cotton mill in Manchester, England

- Location in Greater Manchester

Cotton
- Alternative names: Simpson's Mill, Old Mill

Arkwright mill
- Structural system: wooden floored
- Location: Manchester, England
- Owner: Arkwright, Whittenbury, Brocklebank, Simpson and Simpson
- Further ownership: 1786 (Simpson and Simpson)
- Coordinates: 53.4872°N 2.2366°W

Construction
- Renovated: 1854 (After fire)
- Destroyed: 1940
- Floor count: 5
- Floor area: 60.9m X 9.1m

Power
- Engine maker: Hunt
- Engine type: Atmospheric steam engines
- Cylinder diameter and throw: 7 ft 9 in (64 in bore)

Water Power
- Diameter / width of water wheel: 9.1 m / 2.4 m

Equipment
- Date: 1782

References
- Williams & Farnie 1992, pp. 50, 51

Shudehill Mill or Simpson's Mill was a very early cotton mill in Manchester city centre, England. It was built in 1782 by for Richard Arkwright and his partners and destroyed by fire in 1854. It was rebuilt and finally destroyed during the Manchester Blitz in 1940. One of Arkwright's larger mills, it was built three years before his patent lapsed. The mill had a 30 feet diameter water wheel and a Newcomen atmospheric engine was installed. Doubts remain as to why the engine was installed, whether it was a failed attempt to power a mill directly by steam or was modified to assist the wheel. It is possible that this engine, constructed by Hunt, could have been one of the 13 engines installed in Manchester mills by Joshua Wrigley. Water from the upper storage pond turned the water wheel to drive the mill. The steam engine recycled water from the lower storage pond to the upper storage pond. Three more Boulton and Watt engines were installed to power the increasing number of spindles.

== Location ==
Shudehill is in the centre of Manchester, near its highest point. Shudehill Mill was built between Miller Street and Angel Street to the north of Rochdale Road; its site is now a car park. The River Irwell and Mersey had been made navigable to Manchester in the 1720s opening the way for importing raw cotton and exporting finished cloth and the Bridgewater Canal brought coal from the Worsley Navigable Levels to the Castlefield Basin after 1761. Arkwright had patented a water frame to spin cotton, and in 1775 patented a mechanical carding engine. He took out a second patent that year for drawing and roving. All the pieces were in place for a large automated spinning mill to be built in Manchester. Shudehill Mill, a watermill, was next to a stream, but derived its power from cycling water between two storage ponds, a steam pump was used to replenish the upper pond from the lower.

Shudehill Mill was close to three of Manchester's great stations, Manchester Victoria railway station, Manchester Exchange railway station and Oldham Road railway station. Shudehill Interchange is the present metro station. The mill itself would lie under the shadow of the CIS Tower. The Shudehill Conservation Area is the other side of the tower.

== History ==
The site was originally used as a brick works; it was purchased in 1781, by Arkwright and his partners. Simpsons Mill was a five-storey, Arkwright type mill 9.1 m wide and 60.9m long. It housed water frames, carding machines and roving and drawing frames using designs patented by Arkwright. It was driven by a 9.1 m diameter waterwheel driven from the upper storage pond. A steam engine drove a water pump to send the water back to the upper pond. It is thought that the steam engine was of the Newcomen type, though some sources speculate that it could have been of the Savery type. The pump had two cylinders, 31 inches (79 cm) in diameter and a stroke of 93 inches (240 cm) – the steam cylinder was 64 inches (160 cm) in diameter. It operated at 11–12 strokes per minute. It used 5 tonnes of coal a day. It was perhaps because of this excessive coal consumption, that it was supplemented in 1790 with a 6 hp, Boulton and Watt rotative engine. They ran 4,000 spindles. A year later in 1791 they ordered a 40 hp rotative engine to replace them. This was the largest engine that Boulton and Watt had made at that time, and it was operating by the end of the summer in 1792. . A further 30 hp Boulton and Watt was bought in 1799. The mill was destroyed by fire in 1854.

... the first large mill having been erected in Manchester, having been built in the year 1780 by Sir Richard Arkwright and was for many years occupied by him as a cotton mill. The mill, it should be stated, was a very extensive one being five storeys high, upwards of 200 feet long and 30 feet wide. In the centre of the mill, on the outside was a wooden staircase affording communication with each story. The rooms were not partitioned off, but extended the whole length of the building. Of late years it had been occupied for miscellaneous purposes, principally as cotton waste warehouses, its width not being sufficient for the modern machinery. The building belonged to Mr Richard Simpson. It was not insured. His loss was £5000.

— The Manchester Guardian, dated 3rd May 1854

By 1888 it had been rebuilt using many of the original walls. It was at this stage that two extra storeys were added. The two reservoirs were filled in- it operated under steam. Then in October 1892, the mill was sold to Baxendale and Co., a firm of engineers and plumbers' merchants. They described 'the structure, of the mill, was massive brickwork with very heavy wooden floors supported by corbels in the walls.' They redeveloped the site. By 1908 the main building was subdivided. Baxendales mill was destroyed by enemy action on the night of 23 October 1940. The site remained derelict until it was redeveloped by NCP as a car-park.

On 5 February 2006, BBC Channel 4 aired a Time Team episode entitled "Rubble at the Mill". An archeological exploration by Time Team explored the area on the grounds of the original building. This episode can be found on YouTube. In January 2017, funding was secured to begin the construction of Angel Gardens which will cover the site.

== Architecture ==
Simpsons Mill was a five-storey, Arkwright type mill said to be 9.1 m wide and 60.9m long. Baxendaleś mill was seven storeys, and used the same massive walls. In 2004, an archaeological dig was done on the site to try to solve some outstanding questions. It had been claimed that the Newcomen engine was not used as a pumping engine, but was an attempt that failed to power the mill directly from steam. The original width of the first mill was in doubt, and the position of the wheel pit not known. The results suggest that the mill was always 12m wide, and the wheel pit was internal to the mill. The original function of the Newcomen engine remains undecided.

=== Power ===
- The mill was powered by a 9.1m water wheel, with the water being recycled by engine to the top reservoir. A form of pump-storage.
- This was supplemented, or assisted by a Newcomen engine built by Hunt.
- A 6 hp Bolton and Watt replaced or supplemented the Newcomen engine
- A 40 hp Bolton and Watt was introduced to power more spindles
- A 30 hp Bolton and Watt was introduced to power more spindles

The engine house and the chimney were detached from the mill, though a later engine house may have been built adjacent to the centre on the eastern side.

== See also ==
- Textile manufacturing
