= Caldew School =

Location
- Dalston; Carlisle, Cumbria, CA5 7NN; England; 54.8456°N 2.9803°W

Information
- Type: Academy
- Established: 1959
- Local authority: Cumberland Council
- Department for Education URN: 137254 Tables
- Ofsted: Reports
- Headteacher: V Jackson
- Gender: Coeducational
- Age: 11 to 18
- Enrolment: 1046
- Website: www.caldew.cumbria.sch.uk

Caldew School is a coeducational secondary school and sixth form in the village of Dalston in Cumbria, England.

The school has just over a thousand pupils, including the sixth form, with around one hundred teaching staff. Caldew School converted to academy status on 1 August 2011.

== Achievements ==
In 2013, Caldew was given a grade of "good" by Ofsted. This was an improvement from the "satisfactory" it received the year before. Inspectors from Ofsted said Caldew's leaders have "pursued improvements with great determination."

In July 2009, Caldew celebrated its 50th anniversary. It was founded in 1959, with a total of 300 students.

== Results ==
In 2016, all pupils sitting exams left the school with five GCSE passes or more.

== Former students ==
Former pupils include the poet Jacob Polley, writer and TV presenter Grace Dent and William Stobart of the Stobart Group.
