= Sunny Bank =

Historic house in Virginia, United States

- U.S. National Register of Historic Places
- Virginia Landmarks Register
- Drawing of the property

- Location within Virginia Location within the United States
- Location: Northeast of Covesville, west of the junction of VA 712 and VA 631, near South Garden, Virginia
- Coordinates: 37°55′11″N 78°38′53″W
- Area: 105 acres (42 ha)
- Built: 1797
- Architectural style: Early Republic, Jeffersonian
- NRHP reference No.: 76002092
- VLR No.: 002-0096

Significant dates
- Added to NRHP: December 12, 1976
- Designated VLR: April 20, 1976

Sunny Bank is a historic home located near South Garden, Albemarle County, Virginia. It was started in 1797, and is a two-story, frame Palladian style house. It features a two-level pedimented portico projecting from the center three bays. The wings were originally one-story, but later raised to two stories within 20 years of their original construction. Also on the property are a contributing one-story frame office, kitchen and laundry building, smokehouse, log shed, and family cemetery.

It was added to the National Register of Historic Places in 1976.
