= Cowens =

Cowens is a surname. Notable people with the surname include:

- Al Cowens (1951–2002), American baseball player
- Dave Cowens (born 1948), American basketball player and coach
- Jack Cowens (born 1987), Guernsey drummer and musician

== See also ==
- Cowen (surname)
