= River Caldew =

River in Cumbria, England

Caldew
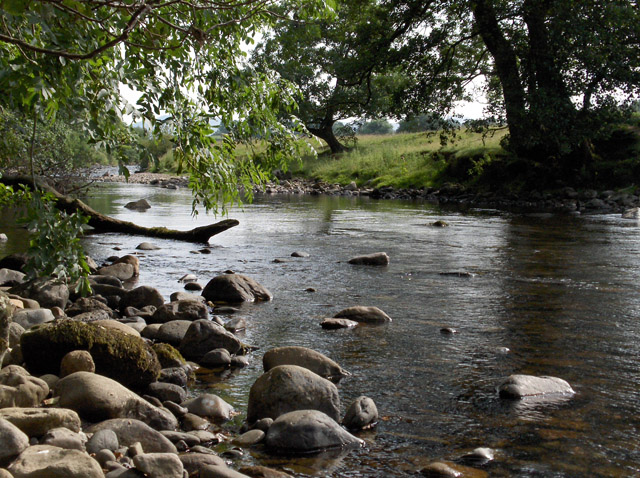
- Caldew near to Welton

- Location within Cumbria

Location
- Country: United Kingdom
- Part: England

Physical characteristics
- Source
  - location: high up on Skiddaw, between its summit and Sale How
- Mouth
  - location: confluence with River Eden
  - coordinates: 54.9028°N 2.9436°W
- Discharge
  - location: Holm Hill
  - average: 4.5 m^{3}/s (160 cu ft/s)

Basin features
- Tributaries
  - right: Roe Beck

The River Caldew is a river running through Cumbria in England. (Note: Historically, the county watered by the Caldew was Cumberland) The river rises high up on the northern flanks of Skiddaw, in the Northern Fells area of the English Lake District, and flows in a northerly direction until it joins the River Eden on the north side of the city of Carlisle. (Note: The map shows the confluence of the River Caldew with the River Eden. The site of the Roman fort of Stanwix ( Petriana ) on Hadrian's Wall, shown to the north of the River Eden, is designated as a World Heritage Site (SHADED POLYGON).)

The Cumbria Way follows most of the course of the river, from its early stages in the Skiddaw Forest to Carrock Fell and again from Caldbeck through to the centre of Carlisle. (Note: See Cumbria Way > Stage 5: Caldbeck to Carlisle)

== Etymology ==
" Probably 'the cold river', from OE 'cald' and OE 'éa' 'river', influenced by OFr 'ewe' 'water'....However, the possibility that this is a Brit.[ish] name meaning 'swift river' from the same root as 'Calder' cannot be ruled out altogether." (OE=Old English, OFr=Old French, Brit.=British language).

== Source of river ==
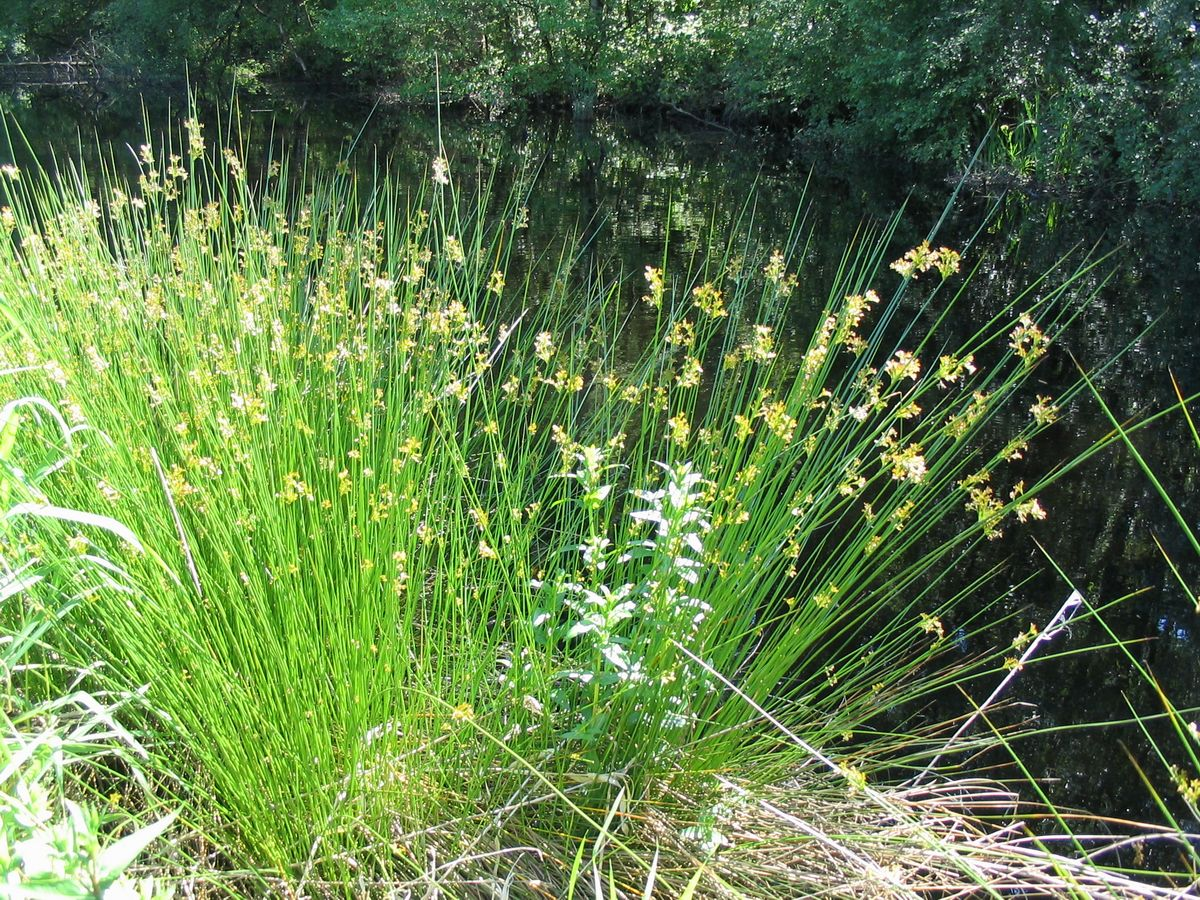
The common rush (Juncus effusus).

The River Caldew's source is high up on Skiddaw, between the summit and Sale How.

Candleseaves Bog is an area of wetland between Skiddaw and Great Calva that contributes to the flow of the river in its early stages. (Note: Candleseaves Bog is designated as Blanket Bog by Natural England ( Use Table of Contents > Habitats and Species > Habitats > Wetland ))

During the Middle Ages, the common rush (Juncus effusus) was important for making rushlights. In Cumbria sedges and rushes were known as " seaves " , hence the origin of the name " Candleseaves " . (Note: Local dialect ' seave ' : ( " sedge, rush " ) (Note: WiKtionary : < seave > From Old Norse sef, whence also Danish siv, Icelandic sef and Swedish säv (“club-rush”).))

== Course of river ==
From its source in the Skiddaw Forest the river runs east through a valley between Bowscale Fell and Carrock Fell. At Hutton Roof, the river emerges from the dale and turns sharply northwards, a course taking it through the settlements of Hesket Newmarket, Sebergham, Buckabank and Dalston. At Buckabank the river flows over a weir that provides a mill stream to the cotton mill and there is a salmon ladder. Flowing under Hawksdale Bridge at Bridge End and Dalston's two other bridges (Jubilee Bridge and the White Bridge) the river then flows towards Cummersdale where another weir used to exist above the now modernised textile mill.

In 2016 the floodwaters of the swollen river Caldew washed away the eighteenth-century Bell Bridge at Sebergham.

The river enters the suburbs of Carlisle north of Cummersdale flowing over a weir in Denton Holme at the site of a large Victorian mill. The river flows through the city from Denton Holme beneath west walls and then the Caldew skirts around the castle before emptying into the River Eden opposite Stanwix.

== See also ==
- List of rivers of England. (Note: See List of rivers of England > Flowing into the Solway Firth > Eden catchment)
