= Dalston, Cumbria =

Village and civil parish in Cumbria, England

Coordinates: 54.8432°N 2.9835°W

Dalston
- Location within Cumbria
- Population: 2,796 (2021)
- OS grid reference: NY395555
  - London: 261 miles (420 km) SSE
- Civil parish: Dalston
- Unitary authority: Cumberland
- Ceremonial county: Cumbria
- Region: North West
- Country: England
- Sovereign state: United Kingdom
- Post town: CARLISLE
- Postcode district: CA5
- Dialling code: 01228
- Police: Cumbria
- Fire: Cumbria
- Ambulance: North West
- UK Parliament: Penrith and Solway
- Website: www.dalston.org.uk

Dalston is a large village and civil parish in the Cumberland unitary authority area of Cumbria, England, on the B5299 road 4 miles (6.4 km) south-west of Carlisle. In 2021 the parish had a population of 2,796.

The village is on the River Caldew, just to the north of where the Roe Beck joins it. Dalston railway station is on the Cumbrian Coast Line between Carlisle, Workington and Barrow-in-Furness. The Cumbria Way long-distance footpath passes through Dalston, following the River Caldew through the grounds of Ellers Mill.

== History ==
In the medieval and early modern periods, the parish of Dalston—including the township of Raughton—was associated with the Bewley (originally de Beaulieu) family of Cumberland. In 1331, goods belonging to the Priory of Carlisle at Dalston were seized during a dispute involving John de Rosse, Bishop of Carlisle, and Roger de Beaulieu; in 1371, Richard de Beaulieu acquired land in Raughton, where a branch of the family remained settled. During the Tudor period, Richard Bewley of Hesket and his son Thomas served as overseers of the West March Border watch stretching from Dalston to Caldbeck.

=== Village emblem and motto ===
Dalston's traditional village emblem is a fighting cock, accompanied by the motto "While I live, I crow" (also rendered "Whilst I live, I crow"). The emblem and motto reflect the village's historical association with cockfighting and gamefowl breeding in Cumberland, particularly the strain of fighting birds known as the Dalston Black-reds (Black-breasted Reds), which were noted in northern cocking circles during the 18th and 19th centuries.

== Historic buildings ==
- Rose Castle: The home of the Bishop of Carlisle for many centuries until 2009, located within the parish of Dalston, 2.5 miles (4.0 km) south of the village centre. The architects Anthony Salvin and Thomas Rickman were responsible for extensive alterations in the 19th century.
- Dalston Hall: A Grade II* listed fortified country house incorporating a 15th-century peel tower and baronial hall, built around 1500 by John Dalston and his wife Elizabeth. During the Siege of Carlisle in 1644–1645, Parliamentary commander General David Leslie used the hall as his headquarters. It was later remodelled in red sandstone in 1899 by architect C. J. Ferguson and now operates as a hotel.
- Hawksdale Hall: A Grade II* listed late-17th-century residence (formerly known as Hawkesdale Low House) with a 1704 addition built for John and Mary Nicholson. It was the home of antiquarian Joseph Nicolson, co-author with Richard Burn of The History and Antiquities of the Counties of Westmorland and Cumberland (1777).
- St Michael's Church: The Grade II* listed Anglican parish church (Church of St Michael and All Angels), dating originally from the 12th and 13th centuries. Partly rebuilt in 1749 and extensively restored in 1890 by C. J. Ferguson, it is constructed of red sandstone rubble and is noted for its 19th-century double open bell-cote. Dalston also has a Methodist church.
- Ellers Mill: Constructed in 1782 as a four-storey water-powered cotton spinning mill along the River Caldew at Buckabank. Taken over in 1821 by Jacob Cowen, who founded Jacob Cowen & Sons Ltd (now Cowens Ltd), it remains in active textile production. The Cumbria Way long-distance footpath passes directly through the Ellers Mill property along the river.

== Governance ==
There is a county electoral division of Dalston, stretching north towards Carlisle, with a total population at the 2011 United Kingdom census of 6,051. Until 1974 it was in the county of Cumberland, and from 1974 until 2023 it was in the City of Carlisle district.

== Education ==
Dalston has two state schools: St Michael's Church of England Primary School and Caldew School (a secondary school and sixth form).

The parish was also home to Lime House School, an independent day and boarding school located at Holm Hill near Dalston, which operated from 1899 (opening at Holm Hill in 1930) until its closure on 31 August 2026.

== Economy ==
Local industry includes a Nestlé factory producing powdered milk, the Barras Lane trading estate, and Ellers Mill (Cowens Ltd), which manufactures technical non-woven textiles and filtration materials.

=== Dalston Oil Terminal ===
With its location just outside Carlisle and near the M6 motorway, the Dalston Oil Terminal served as a major distribution hub for fuels across the Northern England supply corridor. Originally built in 1938 as a facility for the storage of aircraft fuel in the build-up to World War II, the terminal was expanded in the early 1960s by a joint venture between Shell-Mex and BP to include motor spirit tanks. Retained by BP following its 2005 divestment of the Innovene business, it was later purchased by Petroineos in 2010 to support rail-borne exports from its Grangemouth Refinery.

The terminal was fed directly from the Grangemouth Refinery via rail link and delivered petrol, diesel, fuel oil, and kerosene to road customers. In late 2023 Petroineos announced that it would cease manufacturing operations at Grangemouth by 2025 to convert the refinery into an import and distribution terminal. In September 2024, Petroineos confirmed that the closure would result in the sale or closure of the Dalston Oil Terminal, with final fuel shipments concluding at the end of 2024.

== Notable people ==
- Sir James Graham, 2nd Baronet (1792–1861), British statesman who served as Home Secretary and First Lord of the Admiralty; educated at a private school in Dalston kept by the Rev. Walter Fletcher.
- Georgiana Harcourt (1807–1886), translator, born at Dalston while her father Edward Venables-Vernon-Harcourt was Bishop of Carlisle.
- William Paley (1743–1805), English Anglican clergyman, Christian apologist, philosopher, and utilitarian best known for Natural Theology or Evidences of the Existence and Attributes of the Deity; served as Vicar of Dalston from 1780 before becoming Archdeacon of Carlisle.
- Edward Rainbowe (1608–1684), lived at Rose Castle while serving as Bishop of Carlisle.
- George Robinson (1737–1801), London publisher, born in Dalston.
- Sarah Story, radio DJ and broadcaster.
- Musgrave Watson (1804–1847), English sculptor known for his relief of the Battle of Cape St Vincent on Nelson's Column; born at nearby Sebergham and christened at Hawksdale near Dalston in 1804.
- Rev. James Wilson, M.A., Vicar of Dalston and historian, who transcribed and contributed extracts from the Ministers' Accounts of the Bishops of Carlisle for historical research.

== See also ==
- Listed buildings in Dalston, Cumbria
- Unthank, Dalston
