= Buckabank =

Village in Cumbria, England

Coordinates: 54.833°N 2.983°W

- Location in the former Carlisle district, Cumbria Location within Cumbria
- OS grid reference: NY368491
- Civil parish: Dalston
- Unitary authority: Cumberland
- Ceremonial county: Cumbria
- Region: North West
- Country: England
- Sovereign state: United Kingdom
- Post town: CARLISLE
- Postcode district: CA5
- Dialling code: 01228
- Police: Cumbria
- Fire: Cumbria
- Ambulance: North West
- UK Parliament: Carlisle

Buckabank is a small village in the English county of Cumbria. It is situated on the B5299 road about 5 miles (8 km) south-south-west of Carlisle, and approximately a mile from Dalston village centre. In 1870-72 the township had a population of 617.

The village has a very small population and only consists of a few houses; because of this it is often referred to as part of Dalston.
