= Stott (disambiguation) =

Stott or Stotts may refer to:

== People ==
=== Individuals ===
- Alex Stott (1925–1998), British football player
- Alicia Boole Stott (1860–1940), British mathematician
- Amanda Stott (born 1982), Canadian singer
- Andy Stott, 21st-century British musician
- Arnold Stott (1885–1958), British Army general and physician
- Arthur Stott (1909–1993), Canadian diver
- Bob Stott, New Zealand editor of Rails magazine
- Bryan Stott (born 1934), English cricketer
- Bryson Stott (born 1997), American baseball player
- Charles A. Stott (1835–1912), American politician
- Christopher Stott (born 1969), British businessman, husband of Nicole Stott
- Craig Stott (born 1990), Australian actor
- Courtney Stott (born 1992), Canadian kayaker
- Donald Stott (1914–1945), New Zealand WWII soldier
- Edward Stott (1855–1918), English artist, also known as William Edward Stott
- Etienne Stott (born 1979), British Olympic canoeist
- Fraser Stott (born 1969), Scottish rugby player
- Frederick S. Stott (1889–1968), American architect
- George Stott (disambiguation), multiple people
- Gordon Stott, Lord Stott (1909–1999), Lord Advocate of Scotland
- Grace Stott (1845–1922), British missionary
- Grant Stott (born 1967), Scottish football commentator
- Harry Stott (footballer) (1899–1955), English footballer
- Harry Stott (born 1995), British actor
- Heather Stott, English weather forecaster
- James Stott, multiple people
- Jamie Stott (born 1997), English football player
- Jane Stott (c. 1738–1838), English actress, known before her marriage as Jane Lessingham
- John Leslie (born 1965), Scottish entertainer, formerly known as John Leslie Stott
- John Stott (1921–2011) British Evangelical cleric and theologian
- Kathryn Stott (born 1958), British pianist
- Ken Stott (born 1954), Scottish film and television actor
- Keith Stott (1944–2012), English football player
- Kevin Stott (born 1967), American FIFA soccer referee
- Lady Stott, née May Bridges Lee (1884–1977), English artist
- Lally Stott (1945–1977), British songwriter
- Lynton Stott (born 1971), English football player
- Marissa Stott, 21st-century New Zealand actress
- Mary Stott (1907–2002), British feminist and journalist
- Muriel Stott (1889–1985), Australian architect
- Niall Stott (1981), British field hockey player
- Nicole Stott (born 1962), American astronaut
- Norm Stott (born 1904), Australian rules football player
- Peter A. Stott (fl. 1989–2007), British scientist and climate change expert
- Peter Frank Stott (1927–1993), British civil engineer
- Philip Stott (born 1945), British professor emeritus of biogeography
- Philip Sidney Stott (1858–1937), British architect
- Philippe Stott (1938–2014), French bobsledder
- Ramo Stott (1934–2021), American stock car driver
- Raymond Toole Stott (1910–1982), English biographer and historian
- Rebecca Stott (born 1964), British author and academic
- Rebekah Stott (born 1993), New Zealand association footballer
- Richard Stott (1943–2007), British journalist
- Richie Stotts (born 1953), American musician
- Robert Stott (1858–1928), Australian police commissioner
- Robert Stott (British Army officer) (1898–1984), British military commander
- Roger Stott (1943–1999), British politician
- Ron Stott (1938–2014), American businessman and politician
- Ross Stott (born 1988), Scottish field hockey player
- Philip Stott (born 1945), British biogeographer
- Philip Sidney Stott (1858–1937), British architect
- Sue Stott, New Zealand orthopedic surgeon
- Teagn Stott (born 2003), English boxer
- Terry Stotts (born 1957), American basketball coach and former player
- Tom Stott (1899–1976), Australian politician
- Wally Stott (1924–2009), British musician
- Warren Stott (born 1946), New Zealand cricketer
- Wayne Stott (born 1989), British Paratrooper
- Wilfred Stott (1889–1973), Australian rules football player
- William Stott, multiple people

=== Groups ===
- Stott baronets of the United Kingdom
- Stott, a family of British architects

=== Fictional characters ===
- Charless Stott from The Basement (play)

== Other ==
- David Stott Building, a skyscraper in Detroit
- Peter W. Stott Center
- Stott and Sons, an architectural firm founded by Abraham Henthorn Stott
- Stotts City, Missouri, an American city
- Stott's College, an Australian college
- Stotts Creek, a stream in the United States
- Stotts Creek, New South Wales, a stream in Australia
- Stott Hall Farm in England
- Stott Highway, a road in Australia
- Stotts Island Nature Reserve in New South Wales, Australia
- Stott Park Bobbin Mill, a historic building in England
- Stott Pilates
- Støtt or Støttvær, an island group in northern Norway

== See also ==
- Stotz, surname
- Stotting, an animal behaviour
- Amanda Stott (album), a 2000 self-titled album
- Hugh Stott Taylor (1890–1974), British chemist
- Margaret Stott Bhore, British missionary
- Olive Stott Gabriel, American lawyer and suffragist
- Natasha Stott Despoja, Australian politician
- Shirley Stott Despoja, Australian journalist
- Stott Parker (1952–2022), American professor of computer science
- William Stott Banks, English lawyer and writer
