= Listed buildings in Chadderton =

Chadderton is a town in the Metropolitan Borough of Oldham, Greater Manchester, England and it is unparished. It contains 19 listed buildings that are recorded in the National Heritage List for England. Of these, one is listed at Grade II*, the middle grade, and the others are at Grade II, the lowest grade. The area was rural until the coming of the Industrial Revolution, silk weaving arrived in the 18th century, and in the 19th and 20th centuries large cotton mills were built. The Rochdale Canal runs through the town, and two structures associated with it are listed, a bridge and a lock. The oldest listed buildings are farmhouses and a country house. The later buildings reflect the growing wealth of the town, and include cotton mills, churches, civic buildings, and a war memorial.

== Key ==
Grade	Criteria
II*	Particularly important buildings of more than special interest
II	Buildings of national importance and special interest

== Buildings ==
Name and location	Photograph	Date	Notes	Grade
Foxdenton Farmhouse; 53.53900°N 2.15854°W	—	17th century	The original part of the farmhouse is in stone incorporating three cruck trusses, there are 18th and 19th-century extensions in brick, some replacing timber framing, and the roof is mainly in stone-slate with some corrugated sheet. The farmhouse has two storeys, and two bays flanked by cross-wings. The windows are mullioned or mullioned and transomed. Inside the farmhouse there is an inglenook and timber framed internal walls.	II
Foxdenton Hall; 53.53857°N 2.16074°W		1710–1730	A country house in Georgian style, incorporating earlier material. It is in brick with a stone basement, rusticated quoins and a stone-slate hipped roof. There is a U-shaped plan, two storeys with a basement, three bays, and projecting two-bay wings on each side. It has a modillion cornice and central doorways at the front and rear with moulded surrounds and pediments on enriched brackets. The windows are sashes, and there is one dormer window.	II*
Cinder Hill Farmhouse; 53.56687°N 2.15127°W	—	Early 18th century	The farmhouse is in stone on a projecting plinth, with a stone-slate roof, two storeys, two bays, and 20th-century additions. The doorway has a chamfered surround, and the windows, originally mullioned, have had the mullions removed. In the right gable end is a massive chimney stack.	II
Sundial; 53.53840°N 2.16067°W	—	18th century	The sundial is to the rear of Foxdenton Hall. It is in stone, and consists of an octagonal baluster on an octagonal plinth. On the top is a bronze dial dated 1926, and the gnomon is missing.	II
Coneygreen Lock; 53.55495°N 2.16987°W		1794–1804	The lock is on the Rochdale Canal. It is in stone and its gates and winding gear no longer exist.	II
Scowcroft Lane Bridge; 53.55540°N 2.17091°W		1794–1804	The bridge carries a road over the Rochdale Canal. It is in stone and consists of a single elliptical skew arch. The bridge has a band, parapets with round-topped copings, and square terminal piers.	II
St Matthew's Church; 53.55678°N 2.15162°W		1848–1857	The church was designed by E. H. Shellard, and the steeple was added in 1877. It is in stone and has a slate roof with coped gables and finials, and consists of a nave, a chancel, and a southwest steeple, and has 20th-century additions to the west and north. The steeple has a three-stage tower with clasping buttresses, octagonal corner pinnacles, and a squat spire. Inside the church is a west gallery on cast iron columns.	II
Disused bridge over the Rochdale Canal; 53.55583°N 2.17167°W	—	1863	The bridge was built by the Manchester and Leeds Railway Company to carry its line over the Rochdale Canal, and is no longer in use. It is a skew bridge consisting of cast iron beams with wrought iron beams added later. Below the beams stone abutments form a Tudor arch with decorated spandrels.	II
Christ Church; 53.53330°N 2.13916°W		1870	The church, in Gothic Revival style, is in stone and has a roof partly of slate and partly of copper with coped gables. It consists of a nave with a clerestory, north and south aisles, a chancel, and a southeast tower. The tower has four stages, angle buttresses, an embattled parapet, and there is a square stair turret with a pyramidal top.	II
St Luke's Church; 53.54285°N 2.14702°W		1882	The church, designed by Stott and Sons in Gothic Revival style, is in stone on a projecting plinth, and has a slate roof with coped gables and finials. It consists of a nave with a clerestory, north and south low aisles, a chancel, a west baptistry flanked by porches, and a brick lean-to extension.	II
Chadderton Mill; 53.53683°N 2.14155°W		1885	A steam-powered cotton mill designed by P. S. Stott, it was later extended. The mill is in brick with an internal structure of cast iron and steel. There are five storeys, sides of 18 and nine bays, and stair towers at the angles. The engine house projects from the south wall and the chimney is beyond it. In the north wall is a stair and sprinkler tower with lettering in white brick, and to the east is a two-storey extension. The windows have arched heads.	II
Nile Mill; 53.53511°N 2.14526°W		1898	A steam-powered cotton spinning mill designed by P. S. Stott, to which a storey was added in 1905 and an extension in 1907. The mill is in brick with an internal structure of cast iron and steel. It is a double mill with the engine house in the centre, four storeys, and nine bays in each part. At each corner is a stair tower with angle pilasters and stone parapets, and in the middle of the east side is a tower. On the west side, the engine house projects, beyond it is the boiler house, and beyond that is a chimney. There is a detached office block to the south.	II
Former Police Station; 53.54484°N 2.13825°W		1901	The former police station and court building is in Jacobean Revival style, and built in Accrington brick with sandstone dressings and slate roofs. It has a complex plan, with two storeys and an asymmetrical front of seven bays that have four Dutch gables with ball-topped finials. The outer bays contain canted bay windows with shaped parapets and ball finials. The bay to the right of centre is the largest, it projects forward, and in its gable is a sculpture. The windows are mullioned and transomed.	II
Former Central Library; 53.54466°N 2.13862°W		1905	Funding was provided for the library by Andrew Carnegie, which is in Jacobean Revival style. It is in Accrington brick with sandstone dressings and slate roofs with terracotta ridges. On the front are five bays. The first three bays have two storeys and are gabled. The fourth bay is a three-storey entrance tower. The doorway has a decorated doorcase with a pediment containing a cartouche and surmounted by the statue of a reading child. The fifth bay is recessed, lower, and has three storeys. The windows are transomed, some are also mullioned, and in the second bay is an oriel window.	II
Manor Mill; 53.54929°N 2.13580°W		1906	A cotton spinning mill designed by George Stott in brick with stone dressings, an internal structure of cast iron and steel, and a flat roof. There are five storeys, sides of 36 and 13 bays, and corner towers. Between the windows are pilasters with decorative corbels, and at the top is a decorative corbelled eaves cornice. There is a single-storey extension to the east. At the southeast corner is the main tower containing the entrance that has an elaborate architrave with a segmental pediment on elongated console brackets. On the top is an octagonal lantern with lunettes, above which is a copper dome with wrought iron brattishing. To the south is the engine house, the boiler house and chimney, and to the southeast are a separate lodge and office block.	II
Town Hall; 53.54453°N 2.13710°W		1912–13	The town hall is in orange brick on a stone plinth, with sandstone dressings and a hipped slate roof, and is in Edwardian Baroque style. The main front is symmetrical with two storeys and seven bays. The middle bay projects slightly, it is in stone and contains a semicircular porch with Ionic columns, an entablature and a balustraded balcony. Above this is a tall round-headed window and a stepped parapet, and at the top of the building is a dome and a clock lantern. In the outer bays are sash windows, those on the ground floor with segmental heads and large keystones, and those on the upper floor with flat heads. In front of the town hall is a garden enclosed by a brick wall with chamfered stone coping, brick piers with pyramidal caps, and iron railings.	II
Lychgate, Christ Church; 53.53315°N 2.13884°W	—	1913	The lych gate is at the entrance to the churchyard of Christ Church. It has dwarf stone walls, and timber posts supporting clay tile roofs with a cross finial. On one of the walls is an inscription.	II
War memorial 53.54429°N 2.13707°W		1922	The war memorial consists of a granite obelisk. Near the base is a projection acting as a plinth, on which is the bronze figure by Albert Toft depicting a soldier holding a rifle. On the memorial is an inscription relating to both World Wars.	II
St Mark's Church; 53.54692°N 2.13866°W		1962–63	The church was designed by George Pace, and is in blue engineering brick with concrete dressings and slate roofs. The body of the church has a rectangular plan with a narthex, and is canted to the northeast to accommodate the choir. Along the sides of the body of the church are buttresses, and rectangular windows in an irregular pattern. At the south end is a range containing a chapel and vestries, and at its east end is a large tower with a tall saddleback roof containing five tiers of windows with pointed heads.	II
