= Masson Mill =

Cotton mill in Derbyshire, England

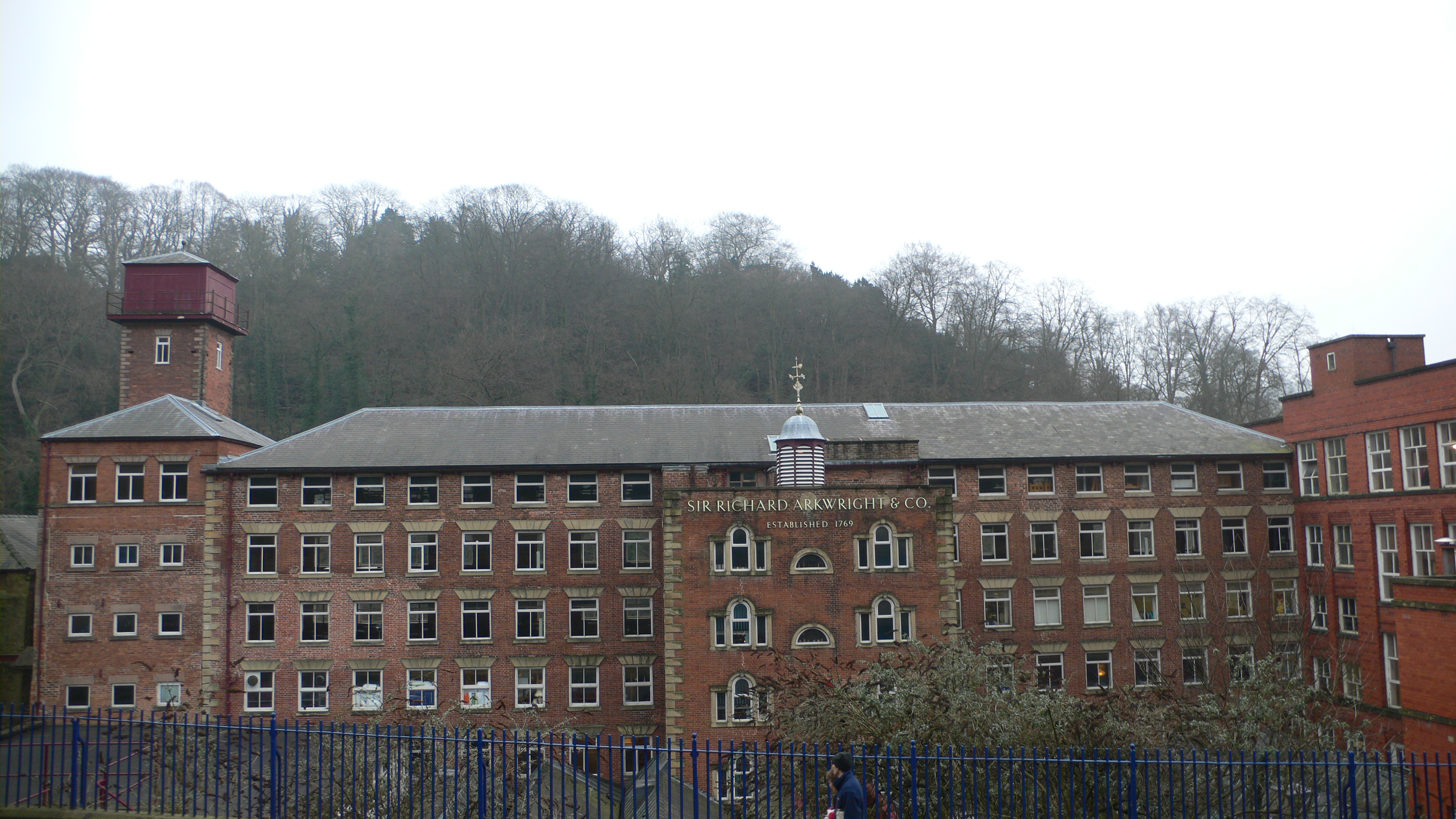
- Masson Mill in 2006

- Location in Derbyshire

Spinning mill (water frame)
- Structural system: Brick on gritstone
- Location: Matlock Bath, Derbyshire, England
- Owner: Arkwright
- Further ownership: English Sewing Cotton Company (1897)
- Current tenants: Museum and retail village
- Coordinates: 53.1128°N 1.5616°W

Construction
- Built: 1783; 243 years ago
- Renovated: 1800 raised to 6 floors; 1835; 1900 chimney and engine house
- Floor count: 5, of 21 bays
- Floor area: 43.8 metres (144 ft) long and 8.4 metres (28 ft) wide

Design team
- Awards and prizes and listings: World Heritage Site

Water Power
- Wheels: Wren and Bennet in 1847; turbines in 1928

Sir Richard Arkwright's Masson Mill is a water-powered cotton spinning mill situated on the west bank of the River Derwent in Matlock Bath, Derbyshire in England. This mill was built in 1783. It forms part of the Derwent Valley Mills, a World Heritage Site. Nearby is Willersley Castle, the house Richard Arkwright built for himself within the parish of Matlock.

== History ==
Following the invention of the flying shuttle for weaving cotton in 1733 the demand for spun cotton increased enormously in England. Machines for carding and spinning had already been developed but were inefficient and the cotton produced was of insufficient quality to form the warp of the weave. In 1769, Arkwright patented a water frame to use the extra power of a water mill. His first mill was the Cromford Mill in 1771. Masson Mill is the third, and was built close by to take advantage of the greater water flow from the River Derwent.

Constructed in brick on a gritstone with stone quoins and window dressings, the original 21 bay 5 storey building was 43.8 metres long and 8.4 metres wide. The staircase and ancillary services were in a central projection leaving production floors uncluttered, This was an important advance in mill architecture. The mill was powered by a single waterwheel which, by 1801, had been replaced by two, a system which continued (with replacement wheels by Wren and Bennet in 1847) until turbines were installed in 1928. In its original form, the mill was built with a high parapet which concealed a low pitch roof but probably at the same time as the second wheel was added c. 1800, the roof was raised, as a result of which the mill acquired a usable sixth storey.

A weir was built across the Derwent to build up a head for Arkwright's Mill and a pre-existing paper mill. It is unusual in that it is convex in form, rather than the usual concave.

Adams, in his "Gem of the Peak"' (1840) said that Masson Mill 'is replete with the improved machinery employed in making cotton thread'. He also described the night time view as 'exceedingly imposing. The spacious mill, with its hundred lights reflecting on the river and the thick foliage, mingling the din of wheels with the noise of the waterfall'.

Buildings were added to the north and west of the mill by c.1835, some of which were subsequently demolished. In 1911, 1928, and more recently in 1998, extensions were added in Accrington brick. The mill chimney dates from 1900, and this and the engine house were the work of Stott and Sons, the famous mill architects.

In 1897 Masson Mill became part of the English Sewing Cotton Company. Kelly's (1908) Directory stated that 'the Masson Cotton Mills... give employment to many of the inhabitants' [of Matlock Bath]. By 1922 the Masson Cotton Mills were 'now the property of Sir Richard Arkwright and Co. Limited (branch of the English Sewing Cotton Co. Limited)' and the mill continued to be a major employer in the area. The mill has been extensively repaired and restored recently. The mill is now home to a museum, and formerly, a retail village, but this did not reopen following the COVID-19 pandemic.

== Hydroelectric power ==
The original waterwheel was replaced in 1847 by Wren and Bennet of Manchester and this produced the power on site until 1928 when it was replaced by turbines generating hydro-electric power. Significant damage was caused to the hydro-electric mechanism in 1931 when a flood dislodged boulders which damaged the sluice.

There were originally 3 turbines. Two were 150Kw turbines running as a pair; the running gear was Gilbert Gilkes & Gordon Ltd and the generator was made by the Lancashire Dynamo & Crypto Ltd rated at 150kw, 188kva, 550 volts at a speed of 600 rpm. The third was a smaller unit at 100kw with the running gear also by Gilbert Gilkes & Gordon Ltd, and the generator by Lancashire Dynamo & Crypto Ltd and rated at 100kw, 125kva, 500 volts at a speed of 500 rpm.

One of the 150kw turbines was removed in 1973 and replaced with a modern 160kw turbine, the running gear by Gordon Gilkes & Gordon Ltd, and the generator by Macfarlane TBT Engineers & Co Ltd of Glasgow, rated at 160kw, 200kva, 415/240 volts at a speed of 1000rpm. The gearbox on this unit was made by R.W. Transmission Ltd. This turbine is still operating today.

The current hydroelectric generators were installed in 1995 and they generate 240 kW.

== Gallery ==
Masson Mill

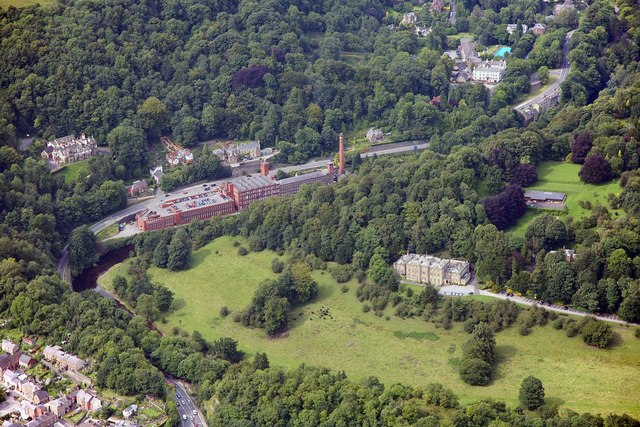

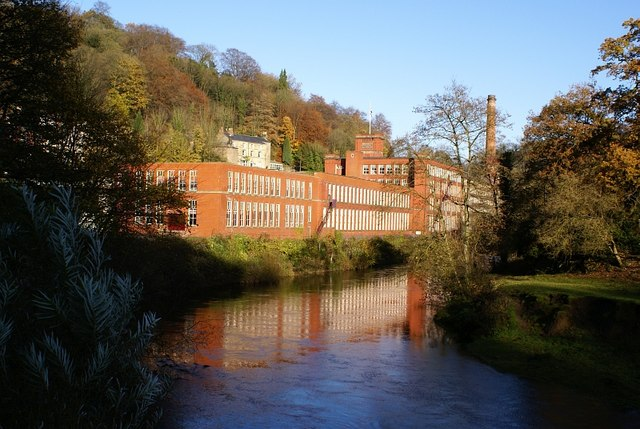

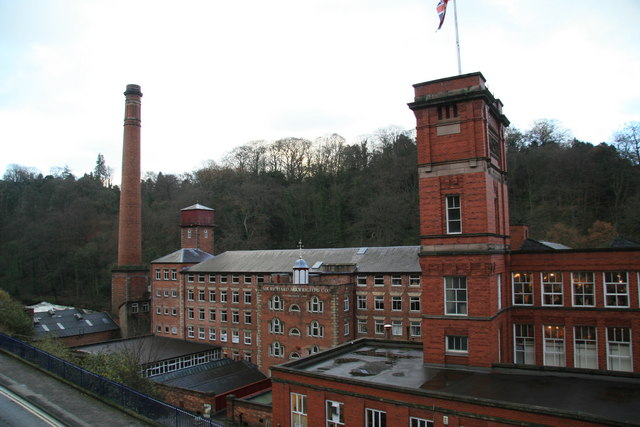
Carding and spinning

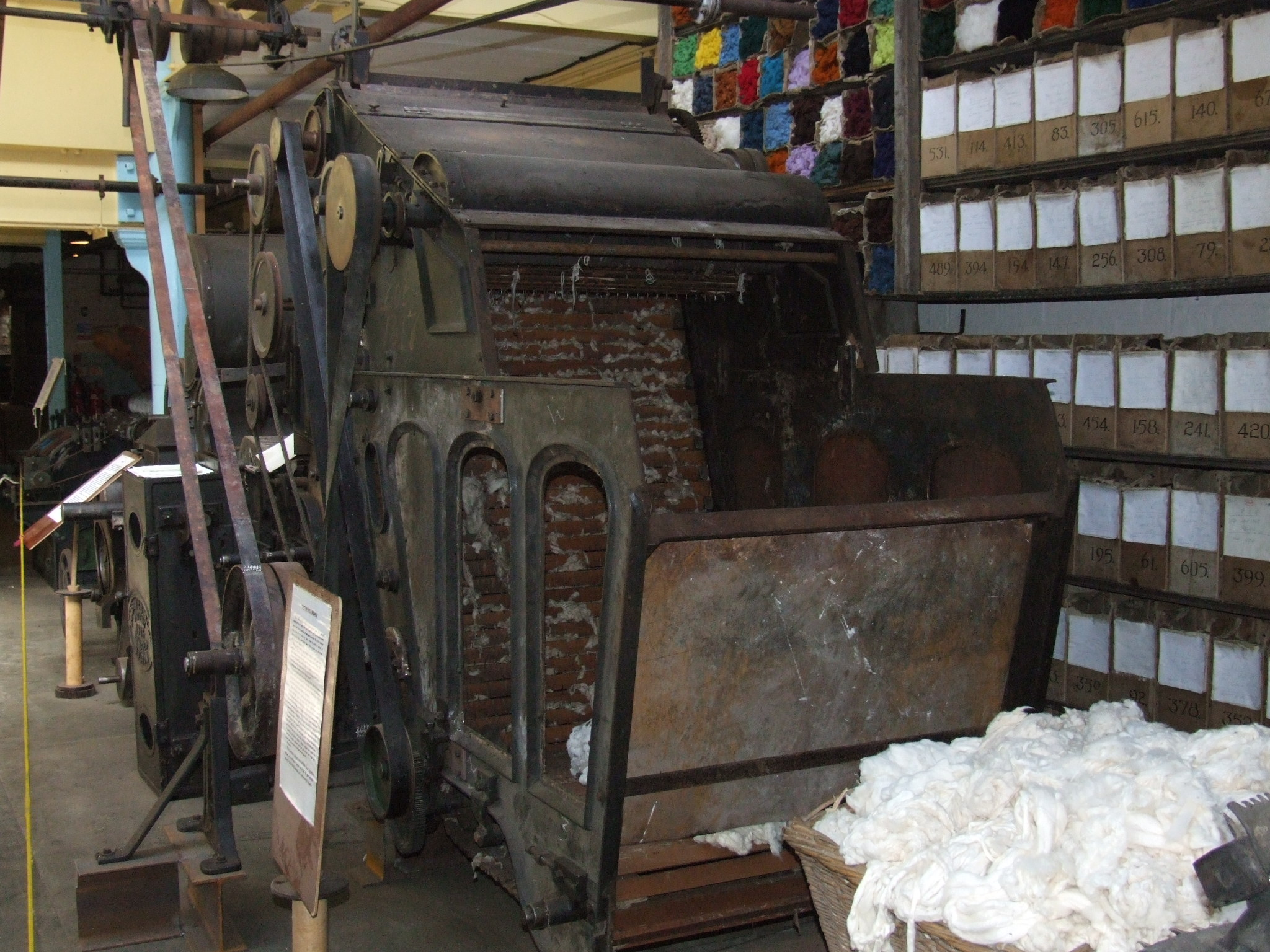
Six cylinder devil

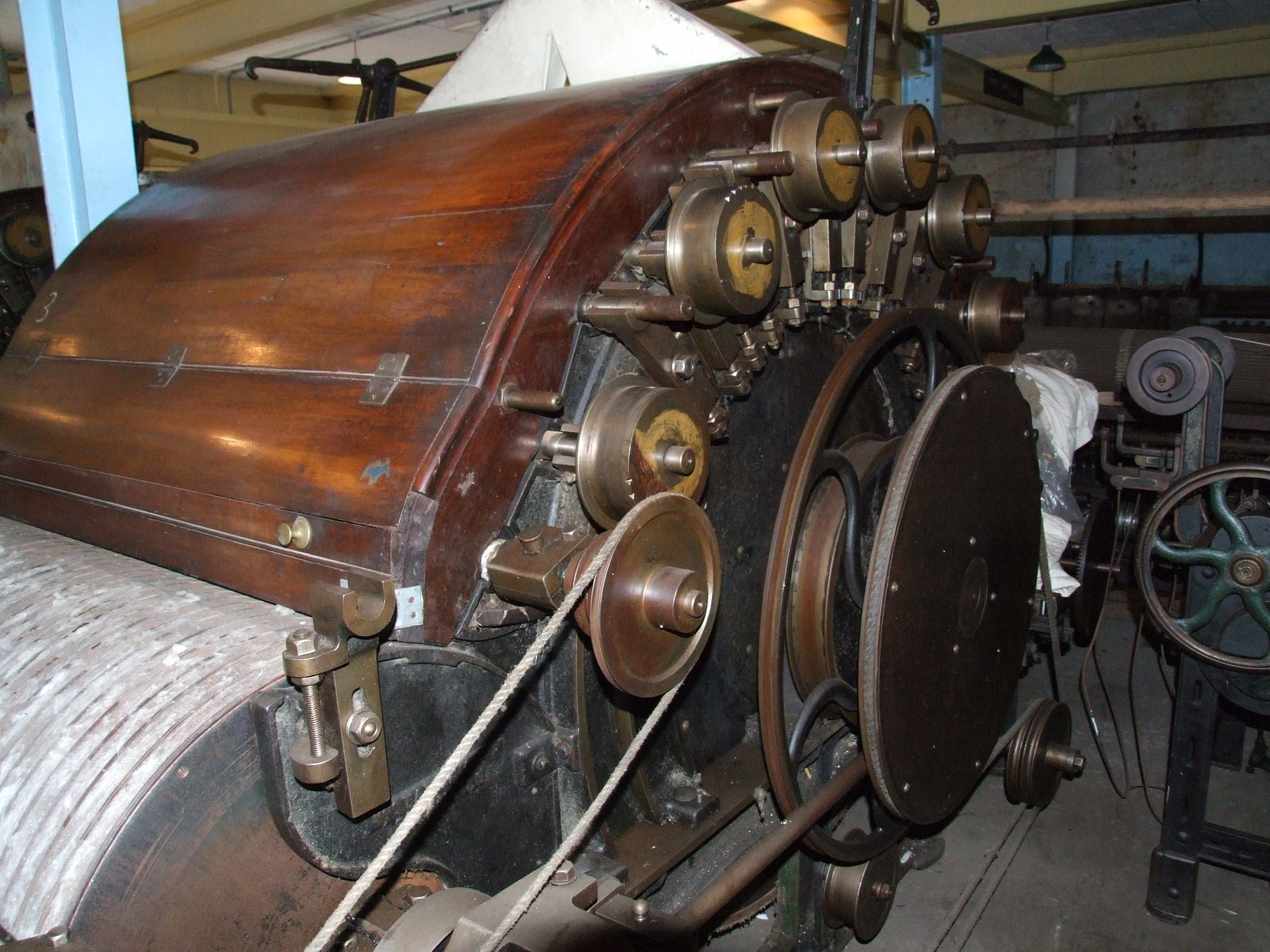
Carder

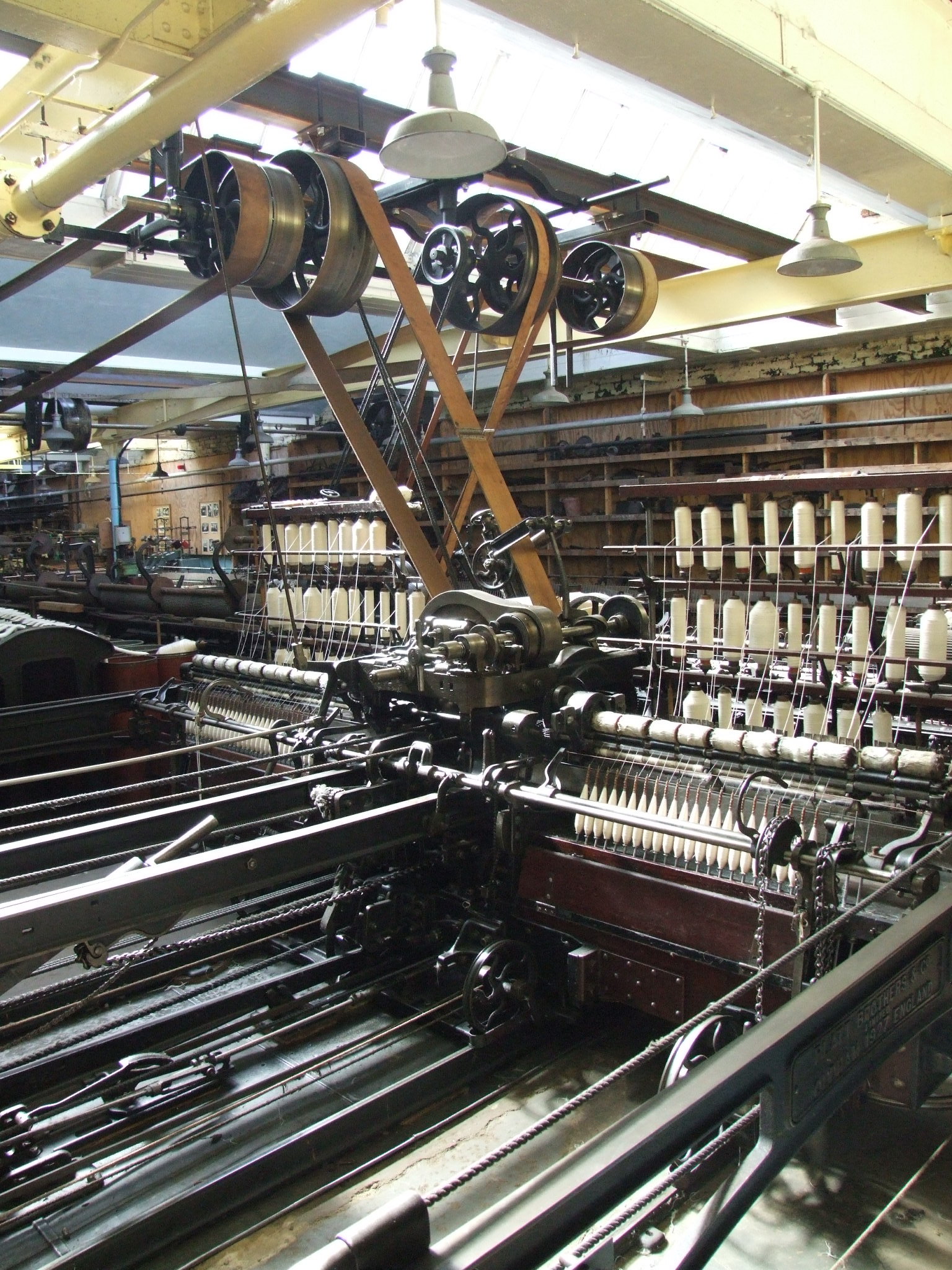
Platt Bros. mule
Loom collection

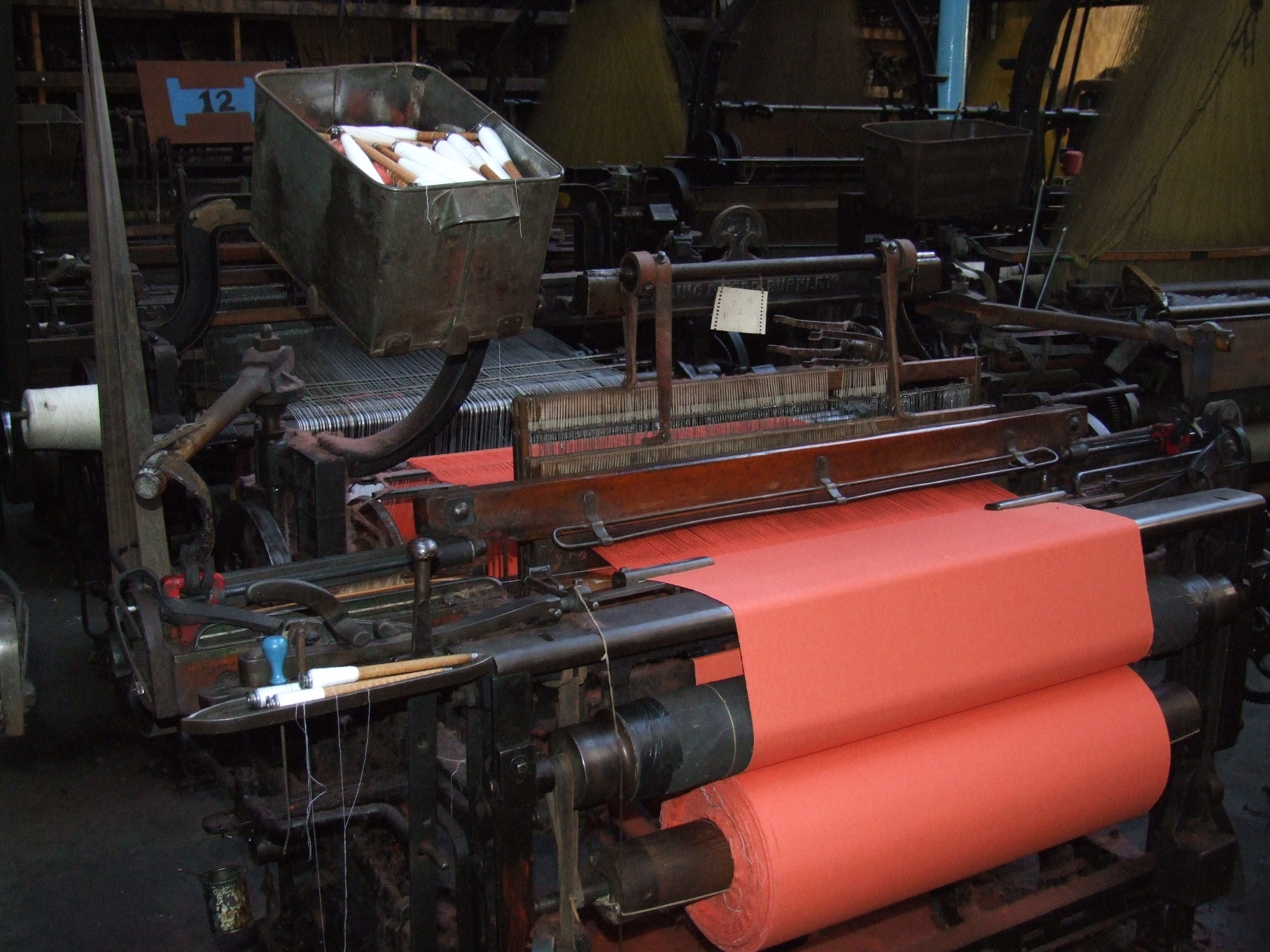
Lancashire loom

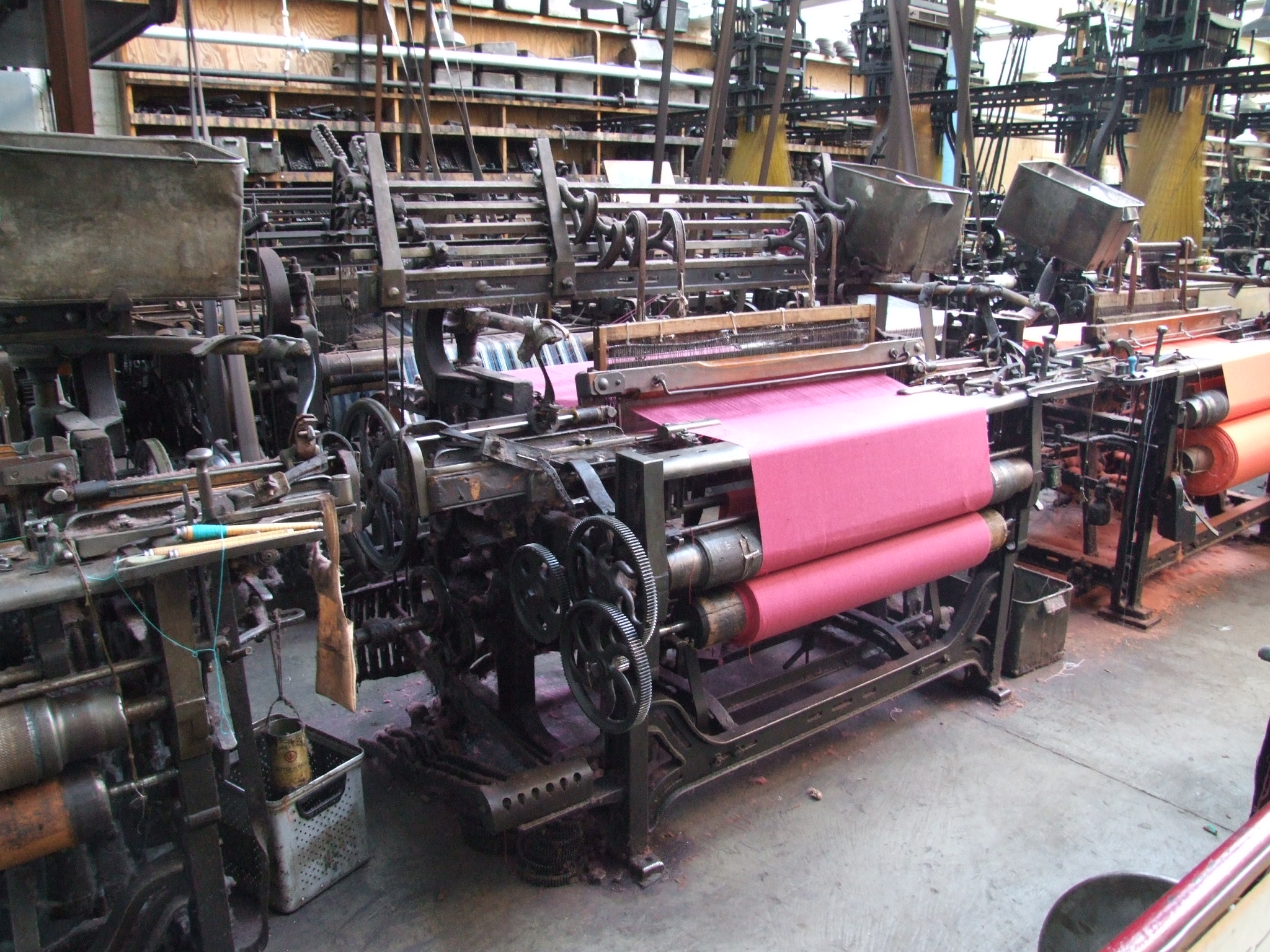
Yorkshire broadloom

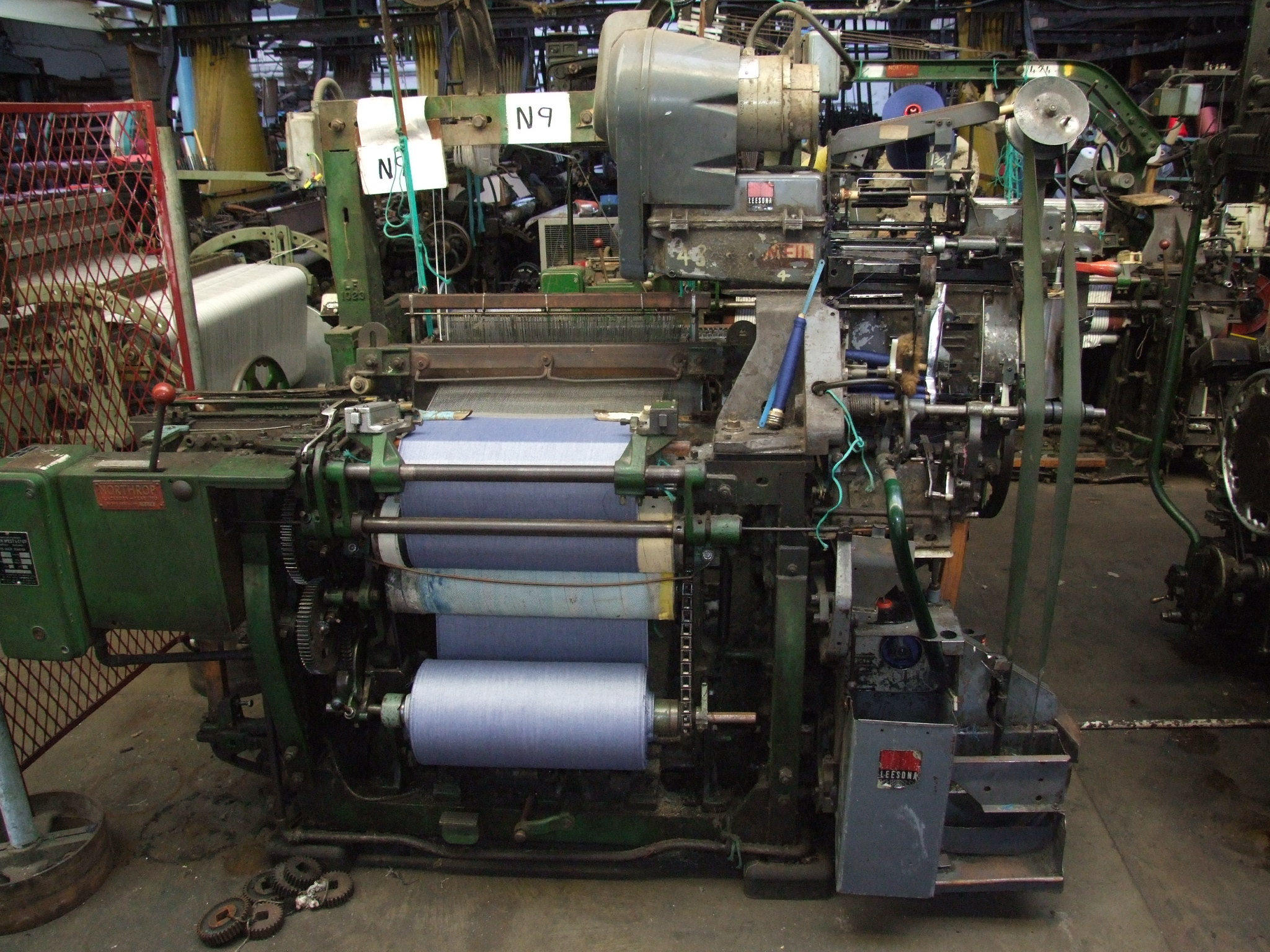
British Northrop loom
