= Atlas Mill, Ashton-under-Lyne =

Cotton mill in Greater Manchester, England

Atlas Mill
- The mill before 1951

- Location in Greater Manchester

Spinning (Mule mill)
- Location: Ashton-under-Lyne, Greater Manchester, England
- Serving railway: Lancashire and Yorkshire Railway
- Owner: Atlas Mill Company Ltd.
- Further ownership: Atlas Mills (1921); Lancashire Cotton Corporation (1929); Courtaulds (1964)
- Current tenants: A housing estate
- Coordinates: 53.4952°N 2.0968°W

Construction
- Built: Feb 1898
- Completed: June 1900
- Demolished: 1994
- Floor count: 4
- Main contractor: J Partington and Son of Middleton Junction

Design team
- Architect: Sydney Stott of Oldham

Power
- Engine maker: George Saxon & Co

Equipment
- Mule Frames: 72,928 spindles (1900)

References
- Haynes 1987, p. 50

Atlas Mill was a cotton spinning mill in the Waterloo district of Ashton-under-Lyne, Greater Manchester, in England. It was built between 1898 and 1900 for the Ashton Syndicate by Sydney Stott of Oldham. It was last mill in Ashton to cease spinning. It was spinning artificial fibres in 1987, it closed in 1990 and was demolished in 1994; the site is now a housing estate.

== Location ==
Atlas mill was built next to Rock Mill which had been built site of the former Wilshaw Mill, on the junction of Oldham Road and Wilshaw Lane. This had been an unusual site for a mill as it was not close to railways or canals. The water needed to supply the steam engine at Wilshaw Mill came from a reservoir formed by damming the Smallshaw Brook. The reservoir was enlarged when Rock Mill was built.

== History ==
The Minerva Spinning Company Limited was registered in 1891 to build the Minerva Mill at Whitelands. The directors were Messrs Barlow, Marland, Coop, Newton, Pollitt and Pownall; they were later referred to as the Ashton syndicate. In 1891, they built Rock Mill. Then 1898, the syndicate registered the Atlas Mill Co. Ltd, with a capital of £70,000 (£8,000,000 as of 2025) to build the Atlas Mill. This was their third mill. The syndicate went on to build Curzon Mill, Tudor Mill, Cedar Mill and finally the Texas Mill.

The cotton industry peaked in 1912 when it produced 8 billion yards of cloth. The Great War of 1914–1918 halted the supply of raw cotton, and the British government encouraged its colonies to build mills to spin and weave cotton. The war over, Lancashire never regained its markets.

On 7 January 1921 all the syndicate's mills went into voluntary liquidation and were passed to the Atlas Mills Ltd group. Atlas Mill was their headquarters. They were struggling. The Bank of England set up the Lancashire Cotton Corporation in 1929 to attempt to rationalise and save the industry. Atlas Mills Limited was taken over by the LCC in 1929. Thus, Atlas Mill was one of 104 mills brought into LCC ownership, and one of the 53 mills that survived through to 1950, where it produced 60 to 100 count mule twist. It closed in 1990 and was demolished in 1994. The site is now a housing estate, part of which was built a number of years before Atlas Mill's closure and was distinguished by a campaign of noise complaint about an establishment of 90 years standing. The roads bear the names Watermill Court and Cedar Mews which gives some indication of their antecedents but will mislead historians about contemporary attitudes.

== Architecture ==
This was a Sydney Stott building. It was four storeys high built on a basement from engineering brick. The large windows were in groups of three, and there was yellow brick decoration. It had a Hotel-de-Ville style water tower. The six bay engine house, boiler house and chimney were to the north.

=== Power ===
The steam engine was by George Saxon & Co, of Openshaw.

== Usage ==
Atlas Mill was used for spinning fine counts of twists and weft from Egyptian cotton. In 1951 it was spinning Egyptian yarns of counts 60 to 100, using both ring and twist spindles. In 1987 it was spinning & winding artificial fibres. The latter utilised advanced German designed Schlafhorst Winding Machinery but as late as 1982 Mather & Platt 1897 winding frames were still used as backup. This can be seen as admirable frugality or as a sign of the make do and mend and lack of investment that resulted in the closure of the Northern Spinning Division.

=== Owners ===
- The Ashton syndicate
- Atlas Mills
- Lancashire Cotton Corporation
- Courtauld's Northern Textiles

== See also ==
- Textile manufacturing

== Bibliography ==
- The mills and organisation of the Lancashire Cotton Corporation Limited. Lancashire Cotton Corporation Limited. 1951.
- Ashmore, Owen (1982). The industrial archaeology of North-west England. Manchester University Press. ISBN 0-7190-0820-4.
- Ashton. "Cotton Mills of Ashton – Archive Photographs". Archived from the original on 15 December 2008.
- Haynes, Ian (1987). Cotton in Ashton. Libraries and Arts Committee, Tameside Metropolitan Borough. ISBN 0-904506-14-2.
- Roberts, A S (1921). "Arthur Robert's Engine List". Arthur Roberts Black Book. One guy from Barlick-Book Transcription. Archived from the original on 23 July 2011.
- Williams, Mike; Farnie, D. A., eds. (1992). Cotton Mills in Greater Manchester. Carnegie Publishing. ISBN 0-948789-89-1.
