= St Matthew's Church, Chadderton =

Church in Oldham, Greater Manchester, England

Coordinates: 53.55676°N 2.15155°W

St. Matthew
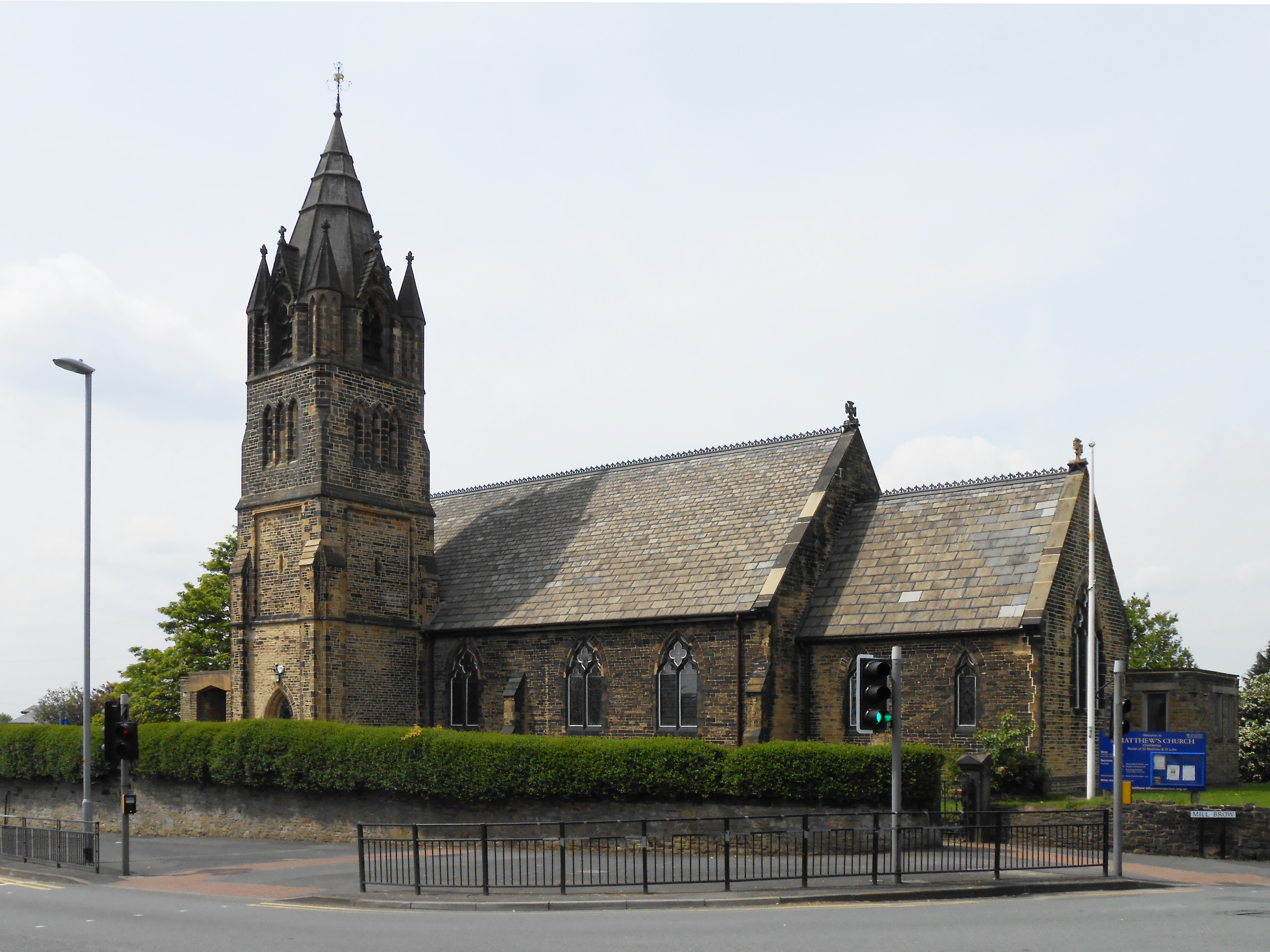

Religion
- Affiliation: Church of England
- District: Diocese of Manchester
- Ecclesiastical or organizational status: Parish church

Location
- Location: Chadderton, Greater Manchester, England
- Interactive map of St. Matthew

Architecture
- Type: Church
- Completed: 1857
- Spire: 1

Website
- St Matthew and St Luke

The Parish Church of St. Matthew is the Church of England parish church for Chadderton in Greater Manchester, England. It forms part of the Diocese of Manchester and is one of several Grade II listed buildings in Greater Manchester.

The Parish of St. Matthew, Chadderton was formed in 1844. Prior to the present building there was a small wooden chapel erected in 1845, to meet the spiritual needs of the parish, whilst the present building was constructed. Work, by E. H. Shellard began in 1847 and the church in its original form was completed and consecrated in 1857. Although the parish at that time was geographically large the number of dwellings was not. However, over the years more housing was built and the parish was divided to form the parishes St. Mark, St. Luke, St. Gabriel, Middleton Junction, St. Anne, Royton and St. Matthew; part of the parish was also annexed to the parish of St. Leonard, Middleton. The current parish has about 2500 dwellings with a population of approximately 7000 souls. Much of the parish is made up of semi-detached housing, with some detached and some terraced. Whilst the area in general can be described as sub-urban, there are pockets of rural land which is farmed, and areas of green-belt. The parish has various ages of housing (most of which is privately owned) some 19th Century, some pre-war and post-war, as well as a 1970s estate and some local authority housing. Around the parish a small retail park and various local shops are located.

The churchyard contains war graves of 14 service personnel of World War I and 9 of World War II.

== See also ==
- Listed buildings in Chadderton
- List of churches in Greater Manchester
- History of Oldham
