= George Stott =

George Stott may refer to:

- George Stott (architect) (1876–1936), English architect
- George Stott (footballer) (1906–?), English footballer
- George Stott (missionary) (1835–1889), British missionary
- George Stott (wrestler) (1888–1969), British wrestler
- George Stott, Lord Stott (1909–1999), Scottish lawyer
