= Curzon Mill, Ashton-under-Lyne =

Cotton spinning mill in Greater Manchester, England

Curzon Mill
- Location in Greater Manchester

Spinning (Mule mill)
- Location: Hurst, Ashton-under-Lyne, Greater Manchester, England
- Serving railway: Lancashire and Yorkshire Railway
- Owner: Curzon Mill Company Ltd.
- Further ownership: Alger Spinning Company Ltd (1911); J.A. Pattreiouex (1942); Qualitex Yarns (1968)
- Coordinates: 53.4959°N 2.0812°W

Construction
- Built: 1899
- Completed: Dec 1901
- Demolished: 1994
- Floor count: 4
- Main contractor: J Partington and Son of Middleton Junction

Design team
- Architect: Sydney Stott

Power
- Engine maker: George Saxon & Co
- Engine type: Horizontal triple expansion, four cylinder
- Valve Gear: Corliss
- Cylinder diameter and throw: 60in
- rpm: 60
- Installed horse power (ihp): 1200
- Flywheel diameter: 26 ft
- No. of ropes: 28

Boiler configuration
- Pressure: 160

Equipment
- Manufacturer: John Hetherington and Son Ltd.
- Mule Frames: 77,928 spindles (1900)

References
- Haynes 1987, p. 50

Curzon Mill, later known as Alger Mill was a cotton spinning mill in the Hurst district of Ashton-under-Lyne, Greater Manchester, in England. It was built between 1899 and 1902 for the Ashton Syndicate by Sydney Stott of Oldham. It was a sister mill to the Atlas Mill. It was sold to the Alger Spinning Co. Ltd in 1911, and closed in 1942. It was then used as a cigarette factory by the J.A. Pattreiouex company until 1966, and then sold to the Qualitex company for the production of artificial fibres. It was still spinning artificial fibres in the 1990s and was demolished in 1994; the site being used for a housing estate.

== Location ==
Curzon Mill was built on Cedar Street, Hurst.

== History ==
The Minerva Spinning Company Limited was registered in 1891 to build the Minerva Mill at Whitelands. The directors were Messrs Barlow, Marland, Coop, Newton, Pollitt and Pownall; they were later referred to as the Ashton syndicate. In 1891, they built the Rock Mill, and in 1898 built Atlas Mill. Curzon Mill built between 1899 and 1902 was their fourth mill and a sister mill to the Atlas mill. It was registered as the Curzon Mill Co. Ltd, with a capital of GBP70,000. Tudor Mill, Cedar Mill and finally the Texas Mill followed.

The cotton industry peaked in 1912 when it produced 8 billion yards of cloth. The great war of 1914–1918 halted the supply of raw cotton, and the British government encouraged its colonies to build mills to spin and weave cotton. The war over, Lancashire never regained its markets. The Ashton syndicate sold the mill to the Alger Spinning Company Limited in 1911, and the mill was renamed the Alger Mill. The Alger Spinning Co was liquidated in 1941.

== Architecture ==
This was a Sydney Stott building. It was four storeys high built on a basement from engineering brick. The large windows were in groups of three, and there was white tile decoration. It had a Hotel-de-Ville style water tower. The six bay engine house, boiler house and chimney were to the north-west

=== Power ===
The steam engine was by George Saxon & Co, of Openshaw. It was 1200 hp horizontal triple expansion four cylinder engine, that ran the forty ton flywheel at 60rpm. There were two 37in diameter low pressure cylinders (LP), an intermediate (IP) of 32in and a high pressure (HP) of 20in. They had a 60in stroke. They had Corliss valves and the air pumps were driven from each crosshead. The boiler operated at 160 psi. The flywheel was 26 ft in diameter and was grooved for 28 ropes.

=== Equipment ===
All the mule frames and equipment was by Hetherington and Sons Ltd. There were 77,184 mule spindles spinning fine counts of twists and weft from Egyptian cotton. By 1911 it was spinning medium counts of American.

== Usage ==
Curzon Mill was used for spinning fine counts of twists and weft from Egyptian cotton. In 1911 it was spinning medium counts of American cotton.

=== Owners ===
- Curzon Mill Company, part of the Ashton syndicate.
- Alger Spinning Company Ltd. (1911–1942)
- J.A. Pattreiouex, cigarette manufacturers (1942–1966)
- Qualitex Yarns (1968– )

== Notable events/media ==
In 1904 there was a lengthy and acrimonious strike at Curzon Mill. The causes and settlement are unclear, but because of the friction and a depression in the market, the directors failed to pay a dividend to the shareholders for half-year ending 24 September 1904. Two possible causes could have been the directors employing 'non-union labour', or tension between management and the spinners and the cardroom operatives. At any rate, the trouble moved onto the street and many women were arrested and bound over to keep the peace for 'shouting'. Commenting on the settlement, the mayor, Alderman Shaw, whose efforts paved the way for a settlement said "Both sides have given way a little, but neither cares to admit it."

== See also ==
- Textile manufacturing

== Bibliography ==
- Ashmore, Owen (1982). The industrial archaeology of North-west England. Manchester University Press. ISBN 0-7190-0820-4.
- Haynes, Ian (1987). Cotton in Ashton. Libraries and Arts Committee, Tameside Metropolitan Borough. ISBN 0-904506-14-2.
- Roberts, A S (1921). "Arthur Robert's Engine List". Arthur Roberts Black Book. One guy from Barlick-Book Transcription. Archived from the original on 23 July 2011.
- Williams, Mike; Farnie (1992). Cotton Mills of Greater Manchester. Carnegie Publishing. ISBN 0-948789-89-1.
