= Tudor Mill, Ashton-under-Lyne =

Cotton mill in Greater Manchester, England

Tudor Mill

- Location in Greater Manchester

Spinning (ring mill)
- Location: Ashton-under-Lyne, Greater Manchester
- Serving canal: Ashton Canal
- Serving railway: Lancashire and Yorkshire Railway
- Owner: Tudor Mill Company
- Further ownership: Atlas Mills (1920s); Lancashire Cotton Corporation (1930s)
- Coordinates: 53.4834°N 2.0988°W

Construction
- Built: 1901
- Completed: May 1903
- Demolished: 22 June 1970
- Main contractor: Partingtons

Design team
- Architect: Sidney Stott of Oldham

Power
- Date: 1903
- Engine maker: George Saxon & Co
- Engine type: Vertical inverted Triple
- Valve Gear: Corliss
- rpm: 75
- Installed horse power (ihp): 1400
- No. of ropes: 40

Boiler configuration
- Boilers: Four Lancashire, coal fired
- Pressure: 160

Equipment
- Manufacturer: Hetherington and Son, Brookes and Doxey
- Mule Frames: 85464 spindles

References
- Haynes 1987, p. 51

Tudor Mill was cotton spinning mill in Ashton-under-Lyne, in the historic county of Lancashire, (now Greater Manchester) England. It was built between 1901 and 1903 for the Ashton Syndicate by Sydney Stott of Oldham. Tudor Mill was next to the Ashton Canal Warehouse at Portland Basin. It ceased spinning cotton in the 1960s and was used as a warehouse until it was destroyed by fire in 1970

== Location ==
Tudor mill was built on the site of the former Portland House and the Stamford brewery, next to the Portland Basin on the final section of the Ashton Canal, where it joined the Huddersfield Narrow Canal.

== History ==
The Minerva Spinning Company Limited was registered in 1891 to build the Minerva Mill at Whitelands. The directors were Messrs Barlow, Marland, Coop, Newton, Pollitt and Pownall; they were later referred to as the Ashton syndicate. The syndicate went on to build the Rock Mill, Curzon Mill, and then, in 1901, the Tudor Mill. It was built with a capital of £70,000. It opened in May 1903 with 250 workers and 85,464. The Tudor Mill Company became part of the Atlas Mills Limited in the 1920s. Further mills built by the syndicate were Cedar Mill and finally the Texas Mill.

The cotton industry peaked in 1912 when it produced 8 billion yards of cloth. The Great War of 1914–1918 halted the supply of raw cotton, and the British government encouraged its colonies to build mills to spin and weave cotton. The war over, Lancashire never regained its markets. The independent mills were struggling. The Bank of England set up the Lancashire Cotton Corporation in 1929 to attempt to rationalise and save the industry. Atlas Mills Limited was taken over by the LCC in 1929. Thus, Tudor Mill was one of 104 mills brought into LCC ownership, and one of the 53 mills that survived through to 1950, though its spindleage had been reduced to 54,104. It closed in the 1960s and was used as a warehouse.

It was destroyed by fire on 24 June 1970.

== Architecture ==
This was a Sydney Stott building. It was six storeys high built on a basement. It was 11 bays long (65 m), and 40m wide with a corner water tower and a detached engine house. The chimney was round and displayed the two rings that were a trademark of a Sydney Stott mill.

=== Power ===
The steam engine was an 1800 hp triple expansion vertical engine by George Saxon & Co, of Openshaw built in 1906. It had an 18-foot flywheel that operated at 75 rpm. The flywheel drove 40 ropes that transmitted the power to each floor. The cylinders all had Corliss valves. They had a 48" throw, the high pressure was 22½" in diameter, the intermediate was 34" and the low pressure was 56". The air pump was driven from the low-pressure crosshead, there was a Saxon governor on the high-pressure end of the bed.

=== Equipment ===
The preparation machinery was provided by Brookes and Doxey, and the mule frames by Hetherington and Sons Ltd. There were 85,464 mule spindles spinning fine counts of twists and weft from Egyptian cotton. By 1948, this had been reduced to 54,104.

== Usage ==
Tudor Mill was used for spinning fine counts of Egyptian cotton, both twists and weft.

=== Owners ===
- The Ashton syndicate
- Atlas Mills
- Lancashire Cotton Corporation
- Other

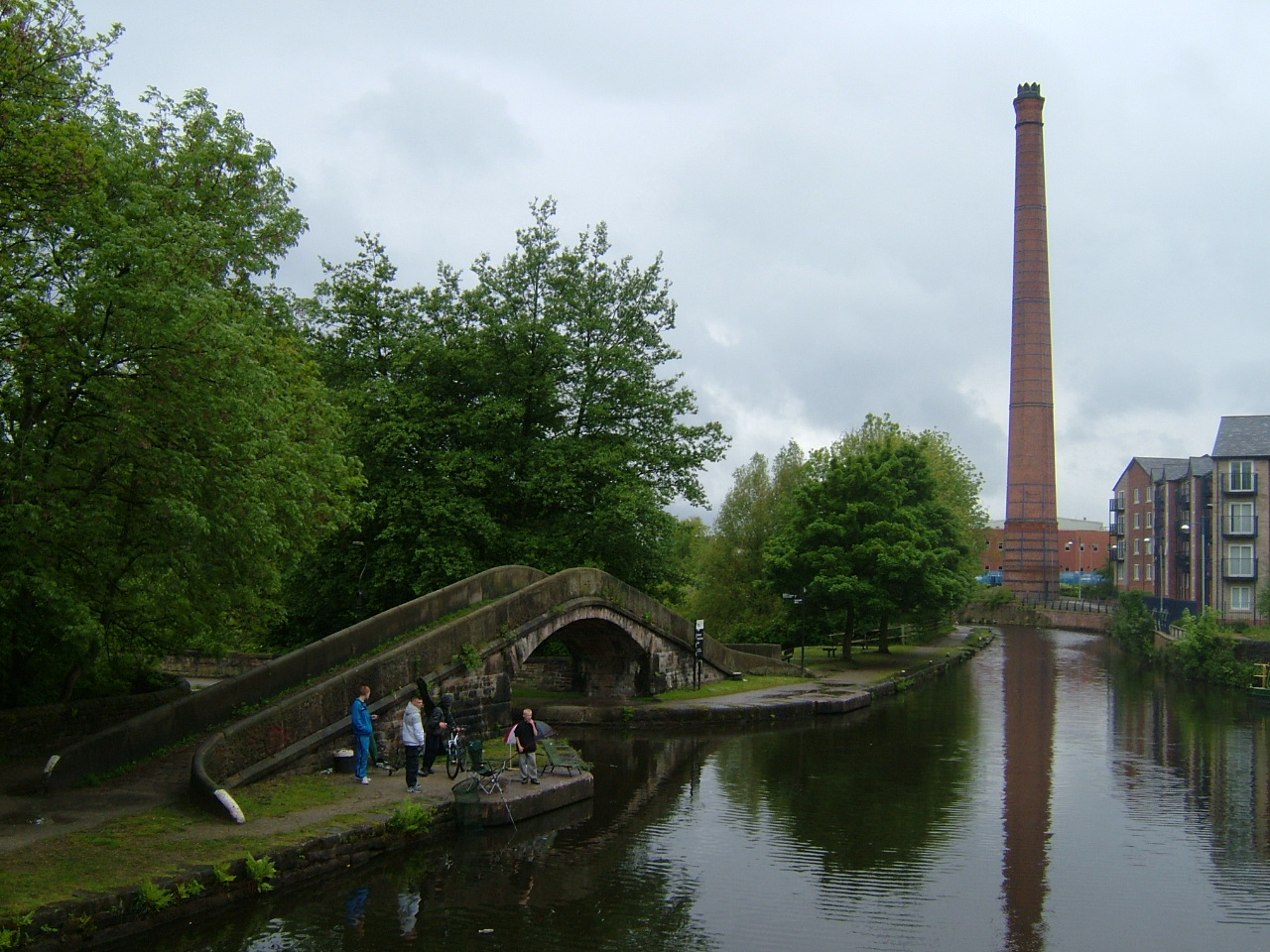
The remaining chimney marks the position of the adjacent Junction Mill

== See also ==
- Textile manufacturing
- Cotton Mill
- Stott

== Bibliography ==
- The mills and organisation of the Lancashire Cotton Corporation Limited, Blackfriars House Manchester: Lancashire Cotton Corporation Limited, 1951
- Haynes, Ian (1987), Cotton in Ashton, Libraries and Arts Committee, Tameside Metropolitan Borough, ISBN 0-904506-14-2
- Roberts, A S (1921), "Arthur Robert's Engine List", Arthur Roberts Black Book., One guy from Barlick-Book Transcription, archived from the original on 23 July 2011
- Williams, Mike; D.A. Farnie (1992), Cotton Mills of Greater Manchester, Carnegie Publishing, ISBN 0-948789-89-1
