= Cedar Mill, Ashton-under-Lyne =

Spinning mill

Cedar Mill

- Location within Greater Manchester

Spinning (ring mill)
- Location: Hurst, Ashton-under-Lyne
- Serving railway: Lancashire and Yorkshire Railway
- Owner: Cedar Mill Company Ltd
- Further ownership: Atlas Mills (1920s); Lancashire Cotton Corporation (1930s)
- Coordinates: 53.4975°N 2.0810°W

Construction
- Built: 1903
- Completed: July 1905
- Demolished: 1988?
- Floor count: 5

Design team
- Architect: Sidney Stott of Oldham

Power
- Date: 1905
- Engine maker: George Saxon & Co
- Engine type: Vertical Triple Expansion
- Valve Gear: Corliss
- rpm: 75
- Flywheel diameter: 22 ft
- Transmission type: ropes
- No. of ropes: 28

Boiler configuration
- Boilers: Four Lancashire, coal fired
- Pressure: 120

Equipment
- Mule Frames: 77,184 spindles

References
- Haynes 1987, p. 51

Cedar Mill was a cotton spinning mill in the Hurst area of Ashton-under-Lyne, Greater Manchester, in England. It was built between 1903 and 1905 for the Ashton Syndicate by Sydney Stott of Oldham. It was the last mill in Ashton spinning cotton. It ceased in 1980. It was demolished and the land was used for housing.

== Location ==
Cedar mill was built on Alderley Street, Hurst, to the north of Ashton.

== History ==
The Minerva Spinning Company Limited was registered in 1891 to build the Minerva Mill at Whitelands. The directors were Messrs Barlow, Marland, Coop, Newton, Pollitt and Pownall; they were later referred to as the Ashton syndicate. The syndicate went on to build the Rock Mill, Atlas Mill, Curzon Mill and the Tudor Mill. Cedar Mill was built with a capital of 70,000 GBP. It was their sixth mill. It installed its machinery in July 1905. The Cedar Mill Company went into voluntary liquidation 7 January 1921 became part of the Atlas Mills Limited. The final mill built by the syndicate was Texas Mill.

The cotton industry peaked in 1912 when it produced 8 billion yards of cloth. The great war of 1914–1918 halted the supply of raw cotton, and the British government encouraged its colonies to build mills to spin and weave cotton. The war over, Lancashire never regained its markets. The independent mills were struggling. The Bank of England set up the Lancashire Cotton Corporation in 1929 to attempt to rationalise and save the industry. Atlas Mills Limited was taken over by the LCC in 1929. Thus, Cedar Mill was one of 104 mills brought into LCC ownership, and one of the 53 mills that survived through to 1950. Ownership passed to Courtaulds Northern Textiles in the 1960s and it was still spinning cotton until 1980, making it the last cotton spinning mill in Ashton.

== Architecture ==
This was a Sydney Stott building. It was five-storeys high built on a basement, built of engineering brick with yellow brick decoration. It had large rectangular windows grouped in threes on the long sides and twos on the others: 30 windows long and 16 windows wide. It was 198 ft by 136 ft. There was an ornamental water tower. The engine and boiler house were to the east. The chimney was round and displayed the two rings that were a trademark of a Sydney Stott mill.

=== Power ===
The steam engine was a 1500 hp triple expansion vertical engine by George Saxon & Co, of Openshaw built in 1905. It had a 22 ft flywheel that operated at 75 rpm. The flywheel drove 28 ropes that transmitted the power to each floor. The cylinders all had Corliss valves. They had a 48 in throw, the High pressure was 20" in diameter, the intermediate was 32 in and the low pressure was 50 in. The air pump was driven from the low pressure crosshead, there was a Saxon governor on the high pressure end of the bed. The boilers operated at 120psi.

== Usage ==
Cedar Mill was used for spinning 50s counts of twists from Egyptian cotton, for the hosiery and manufacturing market.

=== Owners ===
- The Ashton syndicate
- Atlas Mills
- Lancashire Cotton Corporation
- Courtaulds Northern Textiles

== Notable events/media ==
Unusually, the business records of Cedar Mill survive as Cedar Mill, Ashton (DDCM, c 1904 - c 1926), in the Tameside Archives.

== See also ==
- Textile manufacturing
- Cotton Mill
- Stott

== Bibliography ==
- Ashmore, Owen (1975). The industrial archaeology of Stockport. Department of Extra Mural Studies, University of Manchester. ISBN 9780902637177.
- LCC (1951), The mills and organisation of the Lancashire Cotton Corporation Limited, Blackfriars House Manchester: Lancashire Cotton Corporation Limited
- Haynes, Ian (1987), Cotton in Ashton, Libraries and Arts Committee, Tameside Metropolitan Borough, ISBN 978-0-904506-14-3
- Roberts, A S (1921), "Arthur Robert's Engine List", Arthur Roberts Black Book., One guy from Barlick-Book Transcription, archived from the original on 23 July 2011
- Williams, Mike; Farnie (1992). Cotton Mills of Greater Manchester. Carnegie Publishing. ISBN 978-0-948789-89-2.
