= Manor Mill, Chadderton =

Cotton mill in Greater Manchester, England

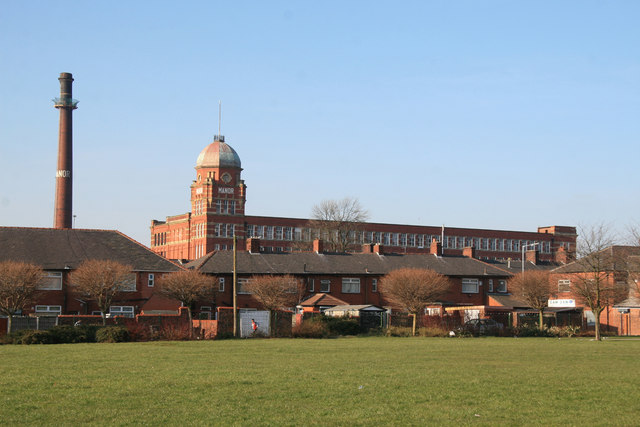
- The mill in 2008

- Location in Greater Manchester

Spinning (ring mill)
- Location: Victoria Street, Chadderton, Oldham, Greater Manchester, England
- Owner: Manor Mill Ltd.
- Further ownership: Lancashire Cotton Corporation (1930s); Courtaulds (1964)
- Coordinates: 53.5492°N 2.1357°W

Construction
- Completed: 1906

Design team
- Architect: George Stott

Power
- Date: 1907
- Engine maker: George Saxon
- Engine type: Cross compound
- Valve Gear: Corliss valves
- Cylinder diameter and throw: 25"HP, 52"LP X 5ft 6" stroke
- rpm: 64 ½ rpm
- Installed horse power (ihp): 1500hp
- Flywheel diameter: 26ft
- Transmission type: Ropes
- No. of ropes: 30

Boiler configuration
- Boilers: Lancashire, coal fired
- Pressure: 160psi

Equipment

Listed Building – Grade II

Manor Mill, Chadderton is an early twentieth century, five storey cotton spinning mill in Chadderton, Oldham, Greater Manchester. It was built in 1906. It was taken over by the Lancashire Cotton Corporation in the 1930s and passed to Courtaulds in 1964. Production finished in 1990.

== Location ==
Oldham is a large town in Greater Manchester, England. It lies amongst the Pennines on elevated ground between the rivers Irk and Medlock, 5.3 miles (8.5 km) south-southeast of Rochdale, and 6.9 miles (11.1 km) northeast of the city of Manchester. Oldham is surrounded by several smaller settlements which together form the Metropolitan Borough of Oldham; Chadderton and Hollinwood are such settlements. Chadderton and Hollinwood are served by the Rochdale Canal and the Hollinwood Branch Canal. A rail service was provided by the Oldham Loop Line that was built by the Lancashire and Yorkshire Railway.

== History ==
Oldham rose to prominence during the 19th century as an international centre of textile manufacture. It was a boomtown of the Industrial Revolution, and amongst the first ever industrialised towns, rapidly becoming "one of the most important centres of cotton and textile industries in England", spinning Oldham counts, the coarser counts of cotton. Oldham's soils were too thin and poor to sustain crop growing, and so for decades prior to industrialisation the area was used for grazing sheep, which provided the raw material for a local woollen weaving trade. It was not until the last quarter of the 18th century that Oldham changed from being a cottage industry township producing woollen garments via domestic manual labour, to a sprawling industrial metropolis of textile factories. The first mill, Lees Hall, was built by William Clegg in about 1778. Within a year, 11 other mills had been constructed, but by 1818 there were only 19 of these privately owned mills.

It was in the second half of the 19th century, that Oldham became the world centre for spinning cotton yarn. This was due in a large part to the formation of limited liability companies known as Oldham Limiteds. In 1851, over 30% of Oldham's population was employed within the textile sector, compared to 5% across Great Britain. At its zenith, it was the most productive cotton spinning mill town in the world. By 1871 Oldham had more spindles than any country in the world except the United States, and in 1909, was spinning more cotton than France and Germany combined. By 1911 there were 16.4 million spindles in Oldham, compared with a total of 58 million in the United Kingdom and 143.5 million in the world; in 1928, with the construction of the UK's largest textile factory Oldham reached its manufacturing zenith. At its peak, there were over 360 mills, operating night and day; The Manor Mill was erected in 1906.

The industry peaked in 1912 when it produced 8 billion yards of cloth. The Great War of 1914–18 halted the supply of raw cotton, and the British government encouraged its colonies to build mills to spin and weave cotton. The war over, Lancashire never regained its markets. The independent mills were struggling. The Bank of England set up the Lancashire Cotton Corporation in 1929 to attempt to rationalise and save the industry. Manor Mill, Chadderton was one of 104 mills bought by the LCC, and one of the 53 mills that survived through to 1950. The mill ceased cotton processing in 1932, but was reopened in 1940 by the Lancashire Cotton Corporation. It finally closed in 1990. It had been intended that the building would become a heritage centre, but this scheme has now been abandoned. Its sister mill, the Kent, designed by George Stott in 1908 was demolished in 1994. Manor Mill was managed by Jim Shelmerdine during most of the LCC years. He received an OBE for "service to the cotton industry" in 1987, a result of the health and safety record he built up in Manor Mill. Shelmerdine was the first to get the annual safety award for ten years.

Since 1997, Manor Mill has been the home of Ultimate Products, a brand house owning household names like Beldray and Salter. In March 2021, Ultimate Products announced a £1.8m investment into a new 4th floor office area at their Manor Mill headquarters completed in the summer of the same year.

== Architecture ==
Designed by George Stott, the Manor Mill was erected in 1906, and is characterised by its impressive copper-covered dome after the Byzantine style. It is built of red brick with stone dressings. It has an external engine house. It is Grade II listed.

=== Power ===
Driven by a 1500 hp cross compound engine by George Saxon, 1907. It had a 26 ft flywheel, 30 ropes operating at 64 ½ rpm. Its cylinders, 25"HP, 52"LP had a 5 ft 6" stroke. It steamed at 160psi.It had Corliss valves on both cylinders. The air pump was driven from each crosshead.

=== Owners ===
- Manor Mill Ltd.
- Manor Mill (1919)
- Lancashire Cotton Corporation (1930s–1964)
- Courtaulds (1964–2019)

== See also ==
- Listed buildings in Chadderton
- Textile manufacturing

== Bibliography ==
- Dunkerley, Philip (2009). "Dunkerley-Tuson Family Website, The Regent Cotton Mill, Failsworth". Archived from the original on 23 March 2008.
- Gurr, Duncan; Hunt, Julian (1998). The Cotton Mills of Oldham. Oldham Education & Leisure. ISBN 0-902809-46-6. Archived from the original on 18 July 2011.
- LCC (1951). The mills and organisation of the Lancashire Cotton Corporation Limited. Blackfriars House, Manchester: Lancashire Cotton Corporation Limited.
- Roberts, A S (1921), "Arthur Robert's Engine List", Arthur Roberts Black Book., One guy from Barlick-Book Transcription, archived from the original on 23 July 2011
