= MK Electric =

English electrical accessories company

- Industry: Electrical accessories
- Headquarters: Basildon, Essex, England
- Area served: Worldwide
- Website: www.mkelectric.com

MK Electric is a company that makes electrical accessories. The company's headquarters are in Basildon, Essex, England, from where it sells goods worldwide.

== History ==
In 1912 Charles Arnold and Charles Belling formed Belling and Company making electric fires. Following his release from the army in 1919 Charles Arnold founded 'The Heavy Current Electrical Accessories Company' with Charles Belling as a shareholder. This was later renamed MK Electric. The company developed electrical equipment such as high rated switches and sockets. A portrait of Charles Arnold by May Bridges Lee is held by the University of Bristol.

=== Multy Kontact socket ===
One product, the Multy Kontact spring grip socket (3-pin plug), soon became a market leader and the British Engineering Standards Association (BESA) changed standards to adopt this new product. By 1923 demand for these new products was growing rapidly and new production facilities were built in Edmonton, Middlesex. The company was then renamed MK Electric after its flagship product.

=== Shuttered socket ===
In 1928 the first shuttered socket was produced which concealed the live and neutral contacts when the plug is pulled out of the socket.

=== World War II ===
During World War II, production at the Edmonton factory focused on munitions to help the war effort, but development work resumed in 1945. In the 1950s MK Electric produced a light switch design which is still used today.

=== Post war ===
In 1966 the company floated on the stock exchange and became MK Electric Holding Company Ltd. The company later became a subsidiary of Honeywell International in 2005 when its parent company Novar plc was acquired. Its factory in Southend-on-Sea produced its one hundred millionth socket in 2014.
