= Rock Mill, Ashton-under-Lyne =

Cotton mill in Greater Manchester, England

Rock Mill

- Location in Greater Manchester

Spinning (Mule mill)
- Location: Ashton-under-Lyne, Greater Manchester, England
- Serving railway: Lancashire and Yorkshire Railway
- Owner: Rock mill Spinning Company
- Further ownership: Atlas Mills (1920s); Lancashire Cotton Corporation (1930s)
- Current owners: Site of Superstore
- Coordinates: 53.4983°N 2.1020°W

Construction
- Built: February 1891
- Completed: August 1893
- Demolished: 1971
- Floor count: 4
- Main contractor: E. & J. Smethurst

Design team
- Architect: Sydney Stott of Oldham

Power
- Date: 1892
- Engine maker: George Saxon & Co
- Engine type: Triple expansion, 4 cylinder
- Valve Gear: Corliss
- Cylinder diameter and throw: 6ft
- rpm: 75
- Installed horse power (ihp): 1250
- Flywheel diameter: 16ft

Boiler configuration
- Boilers: Fernihough and Son, Dukinfield
- Pressure: 120

Equipment
- Mule Frames: 66000 spindles (1894); 74,186 spindles (1911)

References
- Haynes 1987, p. 49

Rock Mill was cotton spinning mill in the Waterloo district of Ashton-under-Lyne, Greater Manchester, in England. It was built between 1891 and 1893 for the Ashton Syndicate by Sydney Stott of Oldham. Rock Mill was built on the site of Wilshaw Mill retaining and using the octagonal chimney. It ceased spinning cotton in the 1960s and was demolished in 1971; the site became the location for the town's first Asda supermarket, which opened in 1972, until Asda relocated to a much larger new store site in Cavendish Street in 1989.

== Location ==
Rock mill was built on the site of the former Wilshaw Mill, on the junction of Oldham Road and Wilshaw Lane. This had been an unusual site for a mill as it was not close to railways or canals. The water needed to supply the steam engine came from a reservoir formed by damming the Smallshaw Brook. The reservoir was enlarged when the new mill was built

== History ==
The Minerva Spinning Company Limited was registered in 1891 to build the Minerva Mill at Whitelands. The directors were Messrs Barlow, Marland, Coop, Newton, Pollitt and Pownall; they were later referred to as the Ashton syndicate. In April 1891, the syndicate registered the Rock Mill Spinning Company Ltd to build the Rock Mill. It was built with a capital of 60,000 GBP. The syndicate went on to build Atlas Mill, Curzon Mill, Tudor Mill, Cedar Mill and finally the Texas Mill. Construction was slow, it was not completed until August 1893. Even then only a third of its 66,000 spindles were working.

The cotton industry peaked in 1912 when it produced 8 billion yards of cloth. The great war of 1914–1918 halted the supply of raw cotton, and the British government encouraged its colonies to build mills to spin and weave cotton. The war over, Lancashire never regained its markets. In the 1920s Rock Mill joined the Atlas Mills Ltd. group, but the independent mills were struggling. The Bank of England set up the Lancashire Cotton Corporation in 1929 to attempt to rationalise and save the industry. Atlas Mills Limited was taken over by the LCC in 1929. Thus, Rock Mill was one of 104 mills brought into LCC ownership, and one of the 53 mills that survived through to 1950, where it produced 30 and 40 count mule twist. It closed in the 1960s and was used as a warehouse.

It was demolished in 1971 to make way for Ashton's first Asda supermarket.

== Architecture ==
This was a Sydney Stott building. It was four storeys high built on a basement. It was 21 bays long (65 m), and 40 m wide with a water tower on the long side. The chimney was octagonal as it also used by the previous mill.

=== Power ===
The steam engine was a 1250 hp triple expansion four cylinder by George Saxon & Co, of Openshaw built in 1892. The twin low pressure cylinders had a diameter of 40in, the intermediate was 36in and the high pressure was 22in. It had a 6 ft stroke. All cylinders had Corliss valves. They drove a 16 ft geared flywheel that geared up, 120 teeth onto 54. The air pumps were driven by crossheads.

=== Equipment ===
The preparation machinery was provided by Brookes and Doxey, and the mule frames by Hetherington and Sons Ltd. There were 85,464 mule spindles spinning fine counts of twists and weft from Egyptian cotton. By 1948, this had been reduced to 54,104.

== Usage ==
Rock Mill was used for spinning finer counts of Egyptian cotton, for twists. By 1911 it was spinning both Egyptian and American, and in 1951 it was spinning 30s and 40s.

=== Owners ===
- The Ashton syndicate
- Atlas Mills
- Lancashire Cotton Corporation

== See also ==
- Textile manufacturing

== Bibliography ==
- The mills and organisation of the Lancashire Cotton Corporation Limited. Blackfriars House Manchester: Lancashire Cotton Corporation Limited. 1951.
- Haynes, Ian (1987). Cotton in Ashton. Libraries and Arts Committee, Tameside Metropolitan Borough. ISBN 0-904506-14-2.
- Roberts, A S (1921). "Arthur Robert's Engine List". Arthur Roberts Black Book. One guy from Barlick-Book Transcription. Archived from the original on 23 July 2011.
- Williams, Mike; Farnie (1992). Cotton Mills of Greater Manchester. Carnegie Publishing. ISBN 0-948789-89-1.
