= Bocholt disaster =

1895 building collapse in Bocholt, Germany

The Bocholt disaster refers to the collapse of Spinnerei Beckmann cotton mill, in Bocholt, Germany, shortly before its completion in 1895. Franz Beckmann, through the offices of Platt Brothers of Oldham, had commissioned Sydney Stott to draw up plans for a mule spinning mill. The foundations were faulty and the mill collapsed on 18 October 1895. There were 22 men killed.
