= Minerva Mill, Ashton-under-Lyne =

Cotton mill in Greater Manchester, England

Minerva Mill
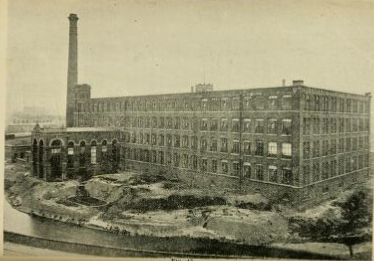
- Minerva Mill in 1895

- Location in Greater Manchester

Spinning (mule mill) and doubling
- Location: Ashton-under-Lyne, Greater Manchester, England
- Serving canal: Huddersfield Narrow Canal
- Serving railway: Lancashire and Yorkshire Railway
- Owner: Minerva Spinning Company Ltd.
- Coordinates: 53.4823°N 2.0882°W

Construction
- Built: 1891
- Completed: Feb 1892
- Demolished: 1937
- Other dimensions: 283ft X
- Floor count: 4
- Main contractor: E. J. Smethurst Oldham

Power
- Date: 1892
- Engine maker: Daniel Adamsons
- Engine type: Twin triple expansion
- rpm: 55
- Installed horse power (ihp): 1500

Boiler configuration
- Pressure: 11.249 bar

Equipment
- Manufacturer: John Hetherington and Sons,
- Mule Frames: 86,868 spindles(1892); 93,828 spindles(1903); Medium counts +22,000 doubling spindles (1920)

References
- Haynes 1987, p. 48

Minerva Mill was a cotton spinning mill in Ashton-under-Lyne, Greater Manchester, England. It was built between 1891 and 1892 for the Minerva Spinning Company which was later known as the Ashton Syndicate. Minerva Mill was next to the later Texas mill, at Whitelands. It ceased spinning cotton in the 1920s and was demolished in 1937.

== Location ==
Minerva mill was built in a bend in the River Tame, close to the Huddersfield Narrow Canal, at Whitelands. It was at the end of Minerva Road.

== History ==
The Minerva Spinning Company Limited was registered in 1891 to build the Minerva Mill at Whitelands. The directors were Messrs Barlow, Marland, Coop, Newton, Pollitt and Pownall; they were later referred to as the Ashton syndicate. The syndicate went on to build the Rock Mill, Atlas Mill, Curzon Mill, Tudor Mill, Cedar Mill and finally the adjoining Texas Mill. The Minerva Spinning Company went out of business in the 1920s.

== Architecture ==
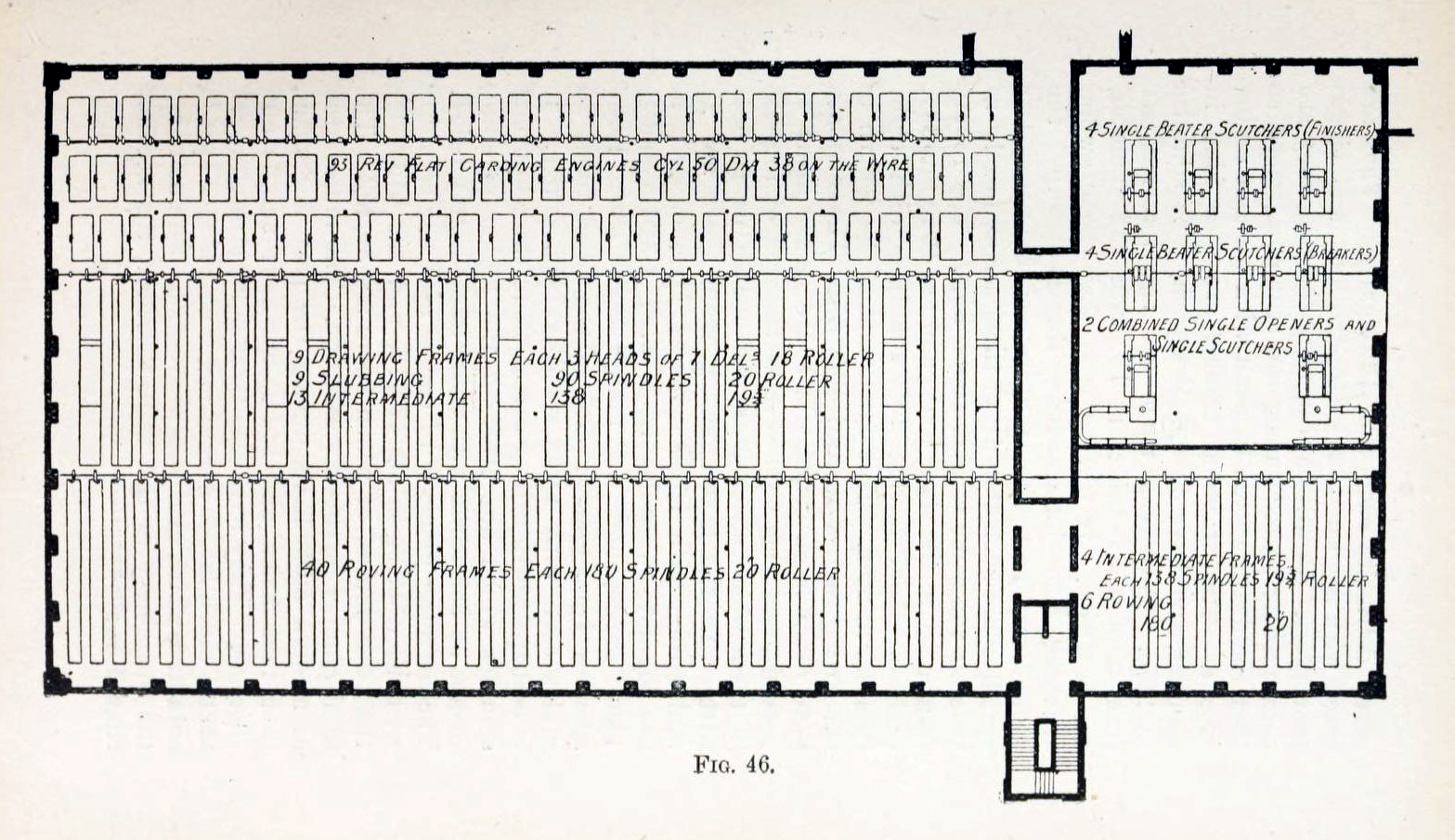
Plan of the card room.

It was designed by Sydney Stott. Four storeys over a basement.

=== Power ===
The steam engine was a 1500 hp twin triple expansion engine by Daniel Adamsons, of Openshaw built in 1906. The cylinders were christened Capital and Labour. It had an 18 ft flywheel that operated at 75 rpm. The flywheel drove 40 ropes that transmitted the power to each floor. The cylinders all had Corliss valves. They had a 48in throw, the High pressure was 22 ½" in diameter, the intermediate was 34 in and the low pressure was 56in. The air pump was driven from the low pressure crosshead, there was a Saxon governor on the high pressure end of the bed.

=== Equipment ===
The mule frames were provided by John Hetherington and Sons Ltd. On startup here were 86,868 mule spindles spinning medium counts from American cotton, that was 40's twists and 65 wefts. By 1903, this had increased to 93828, and by 1920, 22,000 doubling spindles had been added. In order to run these spindles in the spinning rooms, the cotton had to be prepared using openers, scutchers, carding engines.

Equipment in Minerva Mill
Number	Machines	Ratio
2	Vertical Openers and scutchers	1 : 43,434
4	Intermediate Scutchers	1 :21,717
93	Carding Engines	1 :934
63	finishing deliveries of drawing	1 :1,380
792	Slubbing spindles	1 :109.7
1716	Intermediate spindles	1 :50.6
6680	Roving spindles	1 :13
86,868	Mule spindles	1 :1

== Usage ==
Minerva Mill was used for spinning fine counts of Egyptian cotton, both twists and left.

=== Owners ===
- The Ashton syndicate
- Minerva Spinning Company

== See also ==
- Textile manufacturing
