= Texas Mill, Ashton-under-Lyne =

Former cotton spinning mill in Ashton-under-Lyne, England

Texas Mill

- Location in Greater Manchester

Spinning (Mule mill)
- Location: Whitelands, Ashton-under-Lyne, England
- Serving canal: Huddersfield Narrow Canal
- Serving railway: Lancashire and Yorkshire Railway
- Owner: Texas Mill Company Ltd.
- Further ownership: Atlas Mills (1920s); Lancashire Cotton Corporation (1930s); Coutaulds Northern Textiles (1960s)
- Coordinates: 53.4823°N 2.0882°W

Construction
- Built: 1905
- Completed: 1907
- Destroyed: 22–23 October 1971
- Floor count: 4
- Main contractor: J Partington and Son of Middleton Junction

Design team
- Architect: Sidney Stott of Oldham

Power
- Date: 1907 altered 1921
- Engine maker: George Saxon & Co
- Engine type: vertical triple expansion engine (1907) vertical three cylinder compound engine (1921)
- Valve Gear: Corliss
- Cylinder diameter and throw: 48in
- rpm: 78rpm
- Installed horse power (ihp): 1200 (1907); 1500 (1921)
- Flywheel diameter: 22 ft (6.7 m)
- No. of ropes: 28

Boiler configuration
- Pressure: 170psi

Equipment
- Date: 1907
- Manufacturer: Hetheringtons
- Mule Frames: 76,896 spindles (1908) then 35,000 mule spindles (1948)
- Ring Frames path: 35,000 (1948)

References
- Haynes 1987, p. 53

Texas Mill was a cotton spinning mill in the Whitelands district of Ashton-under-Lyne, Greater Manchester, in England. It was built between 1905 and 1907 for the Ashton Syndicate by Sydney Stott of Oldham. It was destroyed in a massive fire on 22–23 October 1971. It had been re-equipped as a ring mill for spinning artificial fibres when it was destroyed.

== Location ==
Texas mill was built next to Minerva Mill in Whitelands, in a meander of the River Tame.

== History ==
The Minerva Spinning Company Limited was registered in 1891 to build the Minerva Mill at Whitelands. The directors were Messrs Barlow, Marland, Coop, Newton, Pollitt and Pownall; they were later referred to as the Ashton syndicate. The syndicate then built Rock Mill, Atlas Mill, Curzon Mill, Tudor Mill, Cedar Mill and finally the Texas Mill. The syndicate registered the Texas Mill Co. Ltd, with a capital of GBP70,000 to build this, their seventh mill.

The cotton industry peaked in 1912 when it produced 8 billion yards of cloth. The great war of 1914–1918 halted the supply of raw cotton, and the British government encouraged its colonies to build mills to spin and weave cotton. The war over, Lancashire never regained its markets.

On 7 January 1921 all the syndicate's mills went into voluntary liquidation and were passed to the Atlas Mills Ltd. group . They were struggling. The Bank of England set up the Lancashire Cotton Corporation in 1929 to attempt to rationalise and save the industry. Atlas Mills Limited was taken over by the LCC in 1929. Thus, Texas Mill was one of 104 mills brought into LCC ownership, and one of the 53 mills that survived through to 1950. It had been converted to rings and it produced 20 to 40 count high class combed and carded hosiery yarns. Later it converted to artificial fibres. Still spinning, was destroyed by fire 22–23 October 1971.

The Texas Mill fire was one of the largest fires in the North West. Lancashire County Fire Service initially responded, but soon requested assistance from neighbouring brigades such was the size of the incident. Firefighters fought the blaze using about 40 pumps plus specials and relief appliances. Sadly, whilst engaged in firefighting duties, Manchester Fire Brigade Fireman Norman Nolan of Blackley Fire Station died when a wall collapsed on him whilst he was working on an escape. Alongside him was Sub Officer Bill Partington of Mossley Fire Station, who survived although badly injured.

The site was cleared and became a bus depot, and when that closed it became a factory.

== Architecture ==
This was a 30 bay mill designed by Sydney Stott, it had his trademark double rings on its chimney. It was four storeys high built on a basement from engineering brick. It had a Hotel-de-Ville style water tower.

The large windows were in groups of three, and there was yellow brick decoration. The six bay engine house, boiler house and chimney were to the north.

=== Power ===
The 1907 steam engine was by George Saxon & Co, of Openshaw. It was built as a triple-expansion at 1200 hp. It was altered in 1921 and became a 1500 hp vertical three-cylinder compound engine. The later engine had a 28-inch-diameter high pressure (HP) in the centre, with a 33-inch IP and 51-inch LP cylinder. It had a 4 ft stroke and ran at 78 rpm. The boiler operated at 170 psi. The 22 ft flywheel was mounted at the end of the shaft, driving 28 ropes. There were Corliss valves on all cylinders. Air pumps were driven from LP and IP crossheads.

In 1921 a new 51-inch LP cylinder was built, the old 21-inch HP removed, and the IP was used for HP.

=== Equipment ===
The mule frames were provided by Hetherington and Sons Ltd. There were 76,896 mule spindles spinning medium counts of yarn from American cotton. By 1948, the mill had been re-equipped with 35,000 ring spindles.

== Usage ==
Texas Mill was used for spinning medium counts of American cotton. In 1951 it was spinning high-class combed and carded hosiery yarns from 20's to 40's count. In 1971 it was spinning artificial fibres.

=== Owners ===
- The Ashton syndicate
- Atlas Mills
- Lancashire Cotton Corporation
- Courtauld's Northern Textiles

== See also ==
- Textile manufacturing
- Stott

== Bibliography ==
- The mills and organisation of the Lancashire Cotton Corporation Limited. Blackfriars House Manchester: Lancashire Cotton Corporation Limited. 1951.
- Ashmore, Owen (1982). The industrial archaeology of North-west England. Manchester University Press. ISBN 0-7190-0820-4.
- Ashton. "Cotton Mills of Ashton — Archive Photographs".
- Haynes, Ian (1987). Cotton in Ashton. Libraries and Arts Committee, Tameside Metropolitan Borough. ISBN 0-904506-14-2.
- Roberts, A S (1921). "Arthur Robert's Engine List". Arthur Roberts Black Book. One guy from Barlick-Book Transcription. Archived from the original on 23 July 2011.
