= Philip Sidney Stott =

British architect (1858-1937)

Sir Philip Sidney Stott Bt
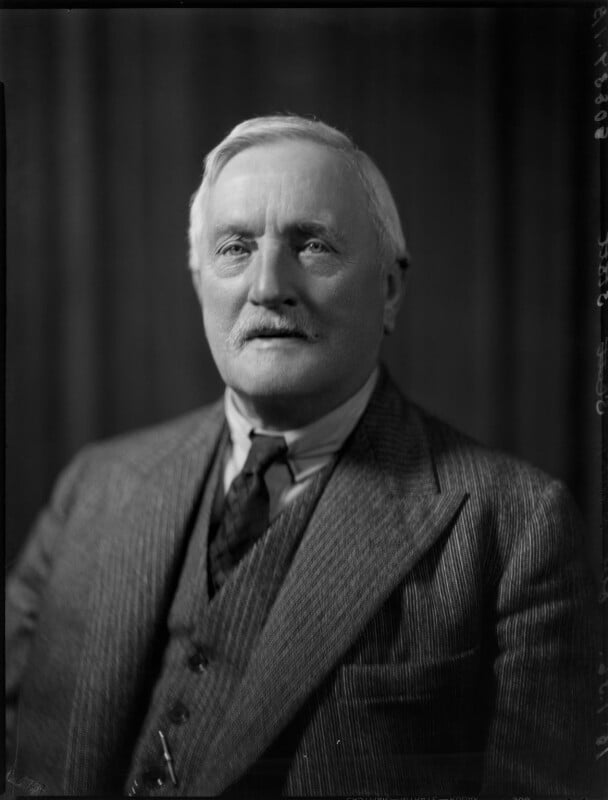
- Stott in 1936
- Born: 20 February 1858; Wykeham Place, Chadderton, Lancashire, England
- Died: 31 March 1937 (aged 79)
- Occupations: Architect, civil engineer, surveyor

Sir Philip Sidney Stott, 1st Baronet (20 February 1858 – 31 March 1937), usually known by his full name or as Sidney Stott, was an English architect, civil engineer and surveyor.

== Early life and career ==
Stott was born in Chadderton, Lancashire, at Wykeham Place (now the site of the former Chadderton Central Library), the third son of Abraham Henthorn Stott. He was educated at Oldham High School and then joined the family firm, which had offices in Oldham and Manchester.

== Design business ==
In 1883, he set up his own business, P. S. Stott, specialising in the design of cotton mills. Many of his designs were erected in Lancashire and across the world, especially in India and the Far East.

He benefited from innovations made by his father and Edward Potts, another Oldham architect. His first mill design was for Chadderton Mill in 1885. Sidney Stott designed 22 mills in Oldham and 55 elsewhere in Lancashire. His last design was for the Maple No 2 Mill in 1915. His work accounted for 44% of the increase in the spinning capacity of the county between 1887 and 1925, and for 40% of the new spindles laid down in Oldham between 1887 and 1914. His mills housed 9 million spindles. He relied on triple brick arches supported on steel beams, a system favoured by George Stott, rather than concrete. His wealth was accumulated from the shares he held in the mills he designed rather than professional fees. Many of his designs were erected across the world, especially in India and the Far East.

== Other interests and later life ==
Stott was a freemason. He was president of the Oldham Lyceum and played rugby for Oldham F.C. (the "Roughyeds") from circa 1877 to 1885. He held several directorships in the Lancashire cotton spinning industry.

Stott moved to Stanton, Gloucestershire (near Broadway, Worcestershire) in 1913 and took up residence in Stanton Court, a Jacobean manor house built in the 17th century, now Grade II listed. He began to devote much of his time to the Conservative Party and the protection of the village. He had purchased much of the area of the village in 1906 and he improved it significantly, restoring all of the properties. In addition, the Stott family built a reservoir in 1907, added lighting to the main street, improved the church, extended the school, built a swimming pool and cricket field.

He was created a baronet in the 1920 Birthday Honours. He became a Justice of the Peace and, in 1925, High Sheriff of Gloucestershire. Stott was created a 1st Baronet on 3 July 1920. Stott and his wife Hannah Nicholson had four children. Hannah died in April 1935. Stott married the portrait painter May Bridges Lee (1884−1977) on 2 January 1936.

In 1923 Stott presented Overstone Park, Northamptonshire, to the Conservative Party for use as a training college for speakers and election agents. It was named the Philip Stott College. It closed in 1929 and its work was transferred to the Bonar Law College. Stott claimed it had never been given enough support and in May 1935 resigned from the presidency of the Cirencester-Tewkesbury Conservative and Unionist Association, citing differences with the party leadership over Indian policy. He died in 1937 aged 79.

After his death, a plaque commemorating Philip Sidney Stott was placed at the Chadderton Central Library near his birthplace. Research at that time revealed that he had designed approximately 28 mills in the area, out of a total of 124 mills designed throughout his career, including 28 overseas. He was a Fellow of the Society of Architects, a member of the Royal Institute of British Architects and president of the Cirencester and Tewksbury Conservative Association; his role as High Sheriff of Gloucestershire spanned 1925–26.

== List of mills designed by Stott ==
=== United Kingdom ===
- Chadderton Mill, Chadderton (1885), listed building
- Falcon Mill, Chadderton (1885)
- Rose Mill, Chadderton
- Minerva Mill, Ashton-under-Lyne, for the Ashton Syndicate
- Rock Mill, for the Ashton Syndicate
- Atlas Mill, for the Ashton Syndicate
- Curzon Mill, for the Ashton Syndicate
- Tudor Mill, for the Ashton Syndicate
- Cedar Mill, for the Ashton Syndicate
- Texas Mill, for the Ashton Syndicate
- Bolton Textile Mill, Moses Gate
- Arrow Vale Mill, Rochdale, listed building
- Nile Mill, Chadderton, listed building
- Orb Mill, Waterhead
- Heron Mill, Hollinwood
- Dawn Mill, Shaw
- Briar Mill, Shaw
- Gorse Mill, Chadderton (1908)
- Cromer Mill, Middleton
- Premier Mill, Stalybridge (integrated mill)
- Empress Mill, Wigan
- Crest Mill, Rochdale (2-storey mill)
- Spur Mill, Reddish (doubling mill)
- Harp Mill, Rochdale (doubling mill)
- Ray Mill, Stalybridge
- Acme Mill, Pendlebury (demolished)—the first mill driven solely by electricity—subject of many L. S. Lowry paintings
- Canal Mill, Radcliffe for John Hamer—still has its chimney with the two bands
- Rye Mill (1905)
- Dee Mill (1906) (demolished)
- Roy Mill (1906) (demolished 1981)
- Royton Ring Mill (demolished)
- Ace Mill, Chadderton
- Ace Mill, Hollinwood also known as Gorse No. 2 (1914) (use of concrete)
- Cairo Mill, Oldham
- Lilac Mill, Shaw
- Mona Mill, Chadderton
- Raven Mill, Chadderton
- Stockfield Mill, Chadderton
- Maple No. 1, Oldham (1904)
- Maple No. 2, Oldham (1915) (use of concrete)

=== Europe ===
- Beckmann Mill, Bocholt, Germany
- Chemnitzer Aktienspinnerei, Chemnitz, Germany
- F.A.Kümpers Spinnerei, Rheine, also known as Spinnerei F.A.K. (1896–1945)
- Noorderhagen Mill, Enschede (G.J. van Heek & Zonen) (1897)
- Rigtersbleek Mill, Enschede (G.J. van Heek & Zonen) (1897)
- Jannink Mill, Enschede (G. Jannink & Zonen) (1898–1908)
- Walshagen Spinnerei, Walshagen, Rheine (1905–07). On the site of the 1895 weaving shed. This was a 4-storey, 42-bay mill 107 m × 68 m, with a single-storey card shed to the east. This was equipped by Platt Brothers, who worked with Sydney on the design. Platt Brothers used this mill for examples of mill design in their subsequent German catalog.
- C. Kümper & Timmerman (1899). Also known as C.K.T. Spinnerei (replacement mill after a fire). Constructed by Bauunternehmens Carl Möller. Equipped with Platt Brothers machines. Powered by 1000PS 3-cylinder steam engine from Firma Sulzer, Winterthur. 28,000 spindles.
- Hardy Jackson & Sohn (1900). Spinnerei Hardy Jackson, extension to an earlier Joseph Stott mill. Ring-spinning mill, 30,000 spindles. Built by Bauunternehmens Eberhard Plümpe.
- Rheine-Gellendorf (1912). Single storey spinning shed, with 50,224 spindles. Building was interrupted by the First World War. The weaving shed completed in 1923 had 1,516 looms.
- Kreymborg & Schem
- Vom Dyckhoff und Stoevecken

== Footnotes ==
Baronetage of the United Kingdom
New creation	Baronet (of Stanton); 1920–1937	Succeeded by George Edward Stott
