= William Stott =

William Stott may refer to:

- William Henry Stott (1863–1930), British member of parliament for Birkenhead West 1924–1929, and Birkenhead East 1924–1929
- William Stott (artist) (1857–1900), British painter
- William Edward Stott (1855-1918), British painter
- Billy Stott (1913–1972), British rugby league footballer
- William Stott (trade unionist) (1879–1956), general secretary of the Transport Salaried Staffs' Association 1936–1940
- Sergeant William Stott (-1945), the probable dispatcher of National Pigeon Service: Pigeon NURP 40 TW 194

== See also ==
- William Stott Banks (1821–1872), antiquary
