= Kent Mill, Chadderton =

Cotton spinning mill in England

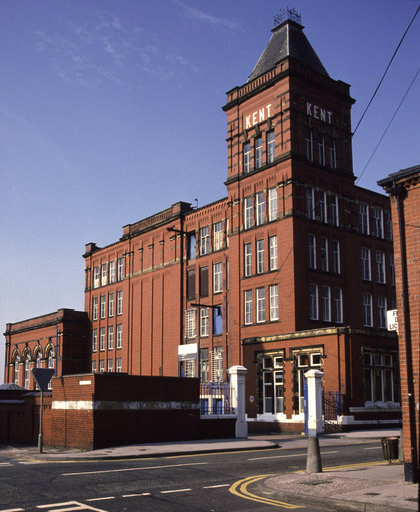

- Location in Greater Manchester

Spinning (ring mill)
- Current status: Closed, 1991
- Location: Chadderton, Greater Manchester, England
- Serving canal: Rochdale Canal
- Owner: Kent Mill Company
- Further ownership: Lancashire Cotton Corporation (1938); Courtaulds (1964)
- Coordinates: 53.550°N 2.136°W

Construction
- Built: 1908
- Demolished: 1994

Design team
- Architect: George Stott

Power
- Engine maker: George Saxon & Co
- Engine type: cross compound
- Valve Gear: Corliss valves
- Cylinder diameter and throw: 25"HP, 52"LP X 5ft 6" stroke
- rpm: 64rpm
- Installed horse power (ihp): 1500
- Flywheel diameter: 26ft
- Transmission type: rope
- No. of ropes: 28

Boiler configuration
- Pressure: 160psi

Equipment
- Ring Frames path: 104,000 spindles

Kent Mill, Chadderton was a cotton spinning mill in Chadderton, Oldham, Greater Manchester. It was built in 1908 for the Kent Mill Co. It was taken over by the Lancashire Cotton Corporation in 1938 and passed to Courtaulds in 1964. Production finished in 1991 and it was demolished in 1994.

== Location ==
Oldham is a large town in Greater Manchester, England. It lies amongst the Pennines on elevated ground between the rivers Irk and Medlock, 5.3 miles (8.5 km) south-southeast of Rochdale, and 6.9 miles (11.1 km) northeast of the city of Manchester. Oldham is surrounded by several smaller settlements which together form the Metropolitan Borough of Oldham; Chadderton and Hollinwood are such settlements. Chadderton and Hollinwood are served by the Rochdale Canal and the Hollinwood Branch Canal. A rail service was provided by the Oldham Loop Line built by the Lancashire and Yorkshire Railway.

== History ==
Oldham rose to prominence during the 19th century as an international centre of textile manufacture. It was a boomtown of the Industrial Revolution, and amongst the first ever industrialised towns, rapidly becoming "one of the most important centres of cotton and textile industries in England", spinning Oldham counts, the coarser counts of cotton. Oldham's soils were too thin and poor to sustain crop growing, and so for decades prior to industrialisation the area was used for grazing sheep, which provided the raw material for a local woollen weaving trade. It was not until the last quarter of the 18th century that Oldham changed from being a cottage industry township producing woollen garments via domestic manual labour, to a sprawling industrial metropolis of textile factories. The first mill, Lees Hall, was built by William Clegg in about 1778. Within a year, 11 other mills had been constructed, but by 1818 there were only 19 of these privately owned mills.

It was in the second half of the 19th century, that Oldham became the world centre for spinning cotton yarn. This was due in a large part to the formation of limited liability companies known as Oldham Limiteds. In 1851, over 30% of Oldham's population was employed within the textile sector, compared to 5% across Great Britain. At its zenith, it was the most productive cotton spinning mill town in the world. By 1871 Oldham had more spindles than any country in the world except the United States, and in 1909, was spinning more cotton than France and Germany combined. By 1911 there were 16.4 million spindles in Oldham, compared with a total of 58 million in the United Kingdom and 143.5 million in the world; in 1928, with the construction of the UK's largest textile factory Oldham reached its manufacturing zenith. At its peak, there were over 360 mills, operating night and day; Kent Mill was built in 1908 by Kent Mill Ltd.

The industry peaked in 1912 when it produced 8 billion yards of cloth. The Great War of 1914–1918 halted the supply of raw cotton, and the British government encouraged its colonies to build mills to spin and weave cotton. The war over, Lancashire never regained its markets. The independent mills were struggling. The Bank of England set up the Lancashire Cotton Corporation in 1929 to attempt to rationalise and save the industry. Kent Mill, Chadderton was one of 104 mills bought by the LCC, and one of the 53 mills that survived through to 1950. In 1950, LCC converted it from a mule mill to a ring mill for Egyptian cotton with 104,000 spindles. The mill closed 1991 and was demolished in 1994.

== Architecture ==
Kent Mill in 1951

.

The architect was G Stott. This was a sister mill to Manor Mill, Chadderton which still stands. The image shows the Hotel de Ville style water tower, the external engine house, and the detached chimney.

=== Power ===
1500 horsepower cross compound George Saxon & Co steam engine 25"HP, 52"LP X 5 ft 6" stroke. 160psi, 64rpm. 26 ft flywheel, 28 ropes. Corliss valves on both cylinders ).

== Usage ==
=== Owners ===
- Kent Mill Company Ltd.
- Lancashire Cotton Corporation (1938–1964)
- Courtaulds (1964–1991)

== See also ==
- Textile manufacturing
