= May Bridges Lee =

English portrait painter (1884–1977)

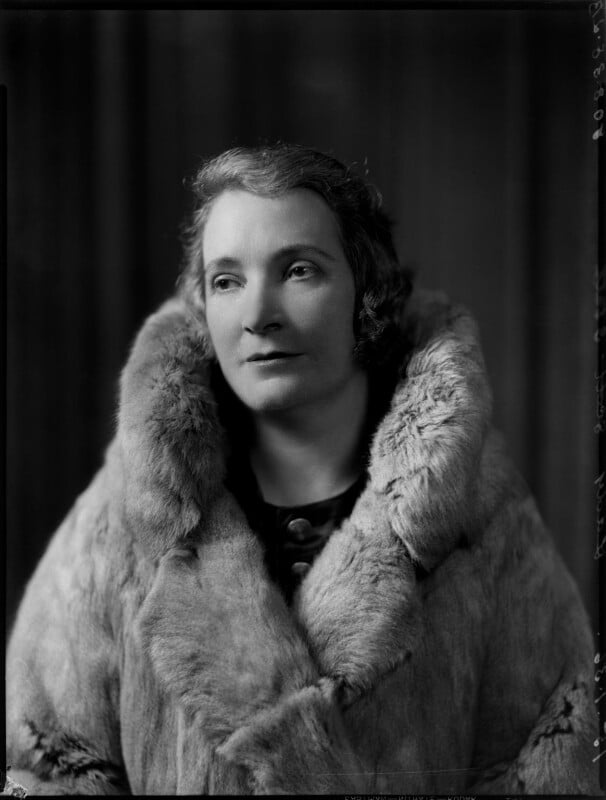
Lee in 1936

May Bridges Lee (1884-1977), later Lady Stott, was an English portrait painter.

Lee's portraits of civic and other dignitaries are held in several public collections. Her Henry Tyler hangs in the Royal London Hospital for Integrated Medicine, successor to the London Homeopathic Hospital of which he was a benefactor, while her work described as Charles Leonard Arnold (1885–1969), Inventor of the Three Pinned Safety Socket, Chairman and Founder of M. K. Electric Ltd is held by the University of Bristol, donated by the sitter's grand-daughter. In 1972 she donated a collection of her miniatures and full-size works to Nuneaton Museum & Art Gallery.

Lee was a full member of the Royal Miniature Society and her Portrait of my Father is exhibited in the society's Diploma Collection. She also exhibited at the Walker Art Gallery in Liverpool and with both the Society of Women Artists and the Society of Miniaturists, at the Royal Academy, the Royal Scottish Academy and at the Paris Salon where she received an Honourable Mention in 1950. Her portrait subjects included Sir Jeremiah Colman, Lord Burnham, Lord Cornwallis and the Earl Manvers.

== Personal life ==
Lee was born in 1884 in Lahore, which was then in India. Her father John Bridges Lee was a barrister in the High Courts of Calcutta, Allahabad and Lahore, and her mother was an artist. Her mother died when she was seven, and she was sent to school in England; her father then had financial troubles which meant she had to leave school aged 15. She started to earn her living by painting, copying old masters onto ivory for snuff box lids, and studied in the evenings at the Lambeth School of Art.

Lee married engineer and architect Sir Philip Sidney Stott (1858-1937) on 2 January 1936, and was thereafter Lady Stott. She continued to maintain a studio in London after her marriage.
