= James Stott =

James Stott may refer to:

- Jimmy Stott, English footballer
- James Stott (trade unionist), British trade union leader
- Jim Stott, English rugby league footballer

== See also ==
- Jamie Stott (born 1997), English footballer
