= Sue Stott =

New Zealand orthopaedic surgeon

Ngaire Susan Stott
- Education: University of Southern California
- Scientific career
- Fields: Paediatric orthopaedic surgery
- Workplaces: University of Auckland
- Thesis: Regulation of chondrogenesis in vitro : the role of hedgehog and Wnt genes (1997)

Ngaire 'Sue' Susan Stott is a New Zealand paediatric orthopaedic surgeon, and as of 2019 is a full professor at the University of Auckland and holds a position at Starship Hospital.

== Academic career ==
After an undergrad at the University of Auckland and a 1997 PhD at University of Southern California titled 'Regulation of chondrogenesis in vitro : the role of hedgehog and Wnt genes' , Stott joined the staff at Auckland University, rising to full professor in 2013. Stott has multiple research fundings and holds multiple roles, including ministerial appointments.

== Selected works ==
- Senthi, Suren, Phil Blyth, Russell Metcalfe, and Ngaire Susan Stott. "Screw placement after pinning of slipped capital femoral epiphysis: a postoperative CT scan study." Journal of Pediatric Orthopaedics 31, no. 4 (2011): 388–392.
- Zhang, Shiran, Nichola C. Wilson, Anna H. Mackey, and Ngaire Susan Stott. "Radiological outcome of reconstructive hip surgery in children with gross motor function classification system IV and V cerebral palsy." Journal of Pediatric Orthopaedics B 23, no. 5 (2014): 430–434.
- Poutawera, Vaughan, and Ngaire Susan Stott. "The reliability of computed tomography scanograms in the measurement of limb length discrepancy." Journal of Pediatric Orthopaedics B 19, no. 1 (2010): 42–46.
