= William Stott Banks =

English lawyer, writer, and antiquary

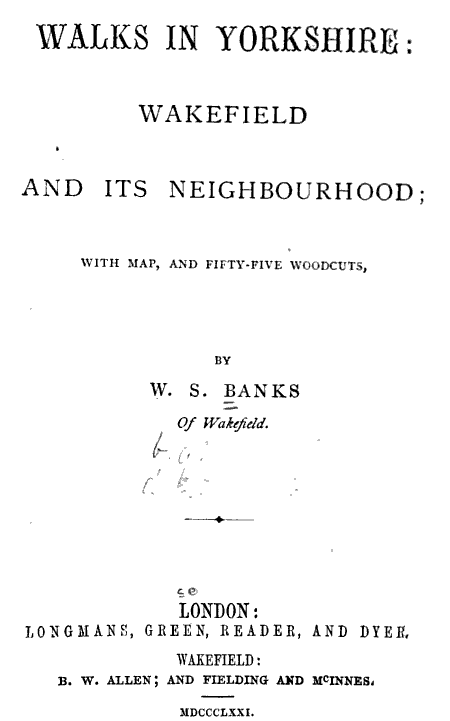
Title page, Walks in Yorkshire: Wakefield and its neighbourhood, published shortly before the author's death

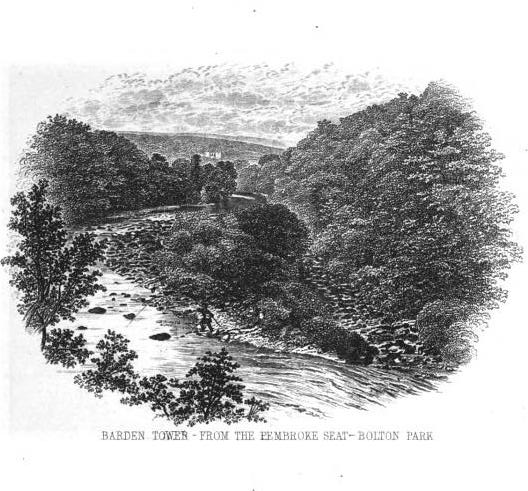
Frontispiece, Walks in Yorkshire, I. in the northwest, II. in the north east, published at London, 1866

William Stott Banks (1821–1872) was an English lawyer, writer, and antiquary.

== Life ==
Banks was born at Wakefield, Yorkshire, on 9 March 1821, to father William Banks and mother Harriot Stott, and was baptised at the congregationalist Salem Chapel on 15 April 1821. He received a scanty education at the Lancasterian school in Wakefield. At the age of 11 he started his working life as office-boy to John Berry, a local solicitor. He was later clerk in the office of Messrs. Marsden & Ianson, solicitors and clerks to the West Riding justices, and upon the dissolution of the firm in 1844 he remained with Mr. Ianson, to whom he subsequently articled himself.

After the usual interval Banks was admitted as an attorney in Hilary Term, 1851, and in 1853 became a partner, the firm being Messrs. Ianson & Banks. On the formation of the Wakefield Borough Commission in March 1870 he was elected clerk to the justices, an office which he retained until his death.

Banks died at his house in Northgate, Wakefield, on 25 December 1872.

== Works ==
Banks had, in 1865, become known as an author by the publication of his 'List of Provincial Words in use at Wakefield'. This is one of the earliest glossaries of a Yorkshire dialect. It was used as the main source on the Wakefield dialect by Alexander John Ellis in his work On Early English Pronunciation, and was also used as a reference for several words in Joseph Wright's English Dialect Dictionary. A 2011 article noted that many of the words recorded by Banks have fallen out of use in Wakefield.

The following year he gave to the world the first of his manuals, entitled 'Walks in Yorkshire: I. In the Northwest; II. In the North-east,' which had previously appeared in weekly instalments in the columns of the Wakefield Free Press. Shortly before his death he issued a companion volume, Walks in Yorkshire: Wakefield and its neighbourhood. .
