= Stott baronets =

Baronetcy in the Baronetage of the United Kingdom

The Stott Baronetcy, of Stanton in the County of Gloucester, is a title in the Baronetage of the United Kingdom. It was created on 3 July 1920 for the architect, civil engineer and surveyor Philip Stott. The second Baronet was an architect and also served as high sheriff of Gloucestershire in 1947. The third Baronet was an architect and composer.

== Stott baronets, of Stanton (1920) ==
- Sir Philip Sidney Stott, 1st Baronet (1858–1937)
- Sir George Edward Stott, 2nd Baronet (1887–1957)
- Sir Philip Sidney Stott, 3rd Baronet (1914–1979)
- Sir Adrian George Ellingham Stott, 4th Baronet (born 1948)

The heir presumptive is Christopher John McMahon Stott (born 1968), a first cousin of the 4th baronet. There are no further heirs to the title.
