= Stott =

Family of English architects

The Stotts were a family of architects from Oldham, North West England, who specialised in the design of cotton mills. James Stott was the father, Joseph and his elder brother Abraham Stott had rival practices, and in later years did not communicate. Their children continue their practices.

== Family tree ==
Stott family of Oldham

James Stott	Mary Henthorn
Abraham Henthorn Stott, Senior "A.H.Stott"; 25 April 1822 – 1904; A H Stott and sons Stott and Sons	James Stott; Stotts of Oldham; Catering equipment	Joseph Stott; 25 October 1836 – 1894; Joseph Stott (1861–1894); Joseph Stott, Heywood and Ogden (1894–1895); Joseph Stott and Son (George Stott, 1896–1936)
Jesse Ainsworth Stott (1853–1917); A H Stott and sons Stott and Sons	Abraham Henthorn Stott, Junior (1856–1931) "Henthorn"; A H Stott and sons Stott and Sons	Philip Sydney Stott "Sydney Stott"; Sir Philip Stott, 1st Baronet' (1858–1937)	George Stott (1876–1936); Joseph Stott and Son (1896–1936)
His sons: James Stott (1880–); Harold Stott (1885–)	George Edward Stott (1887–1957)	Note: Abraham Stott of Abraham Stott and Son (Osborne Mills) was a cousin of A H Stott.

== Joseph Stott ==
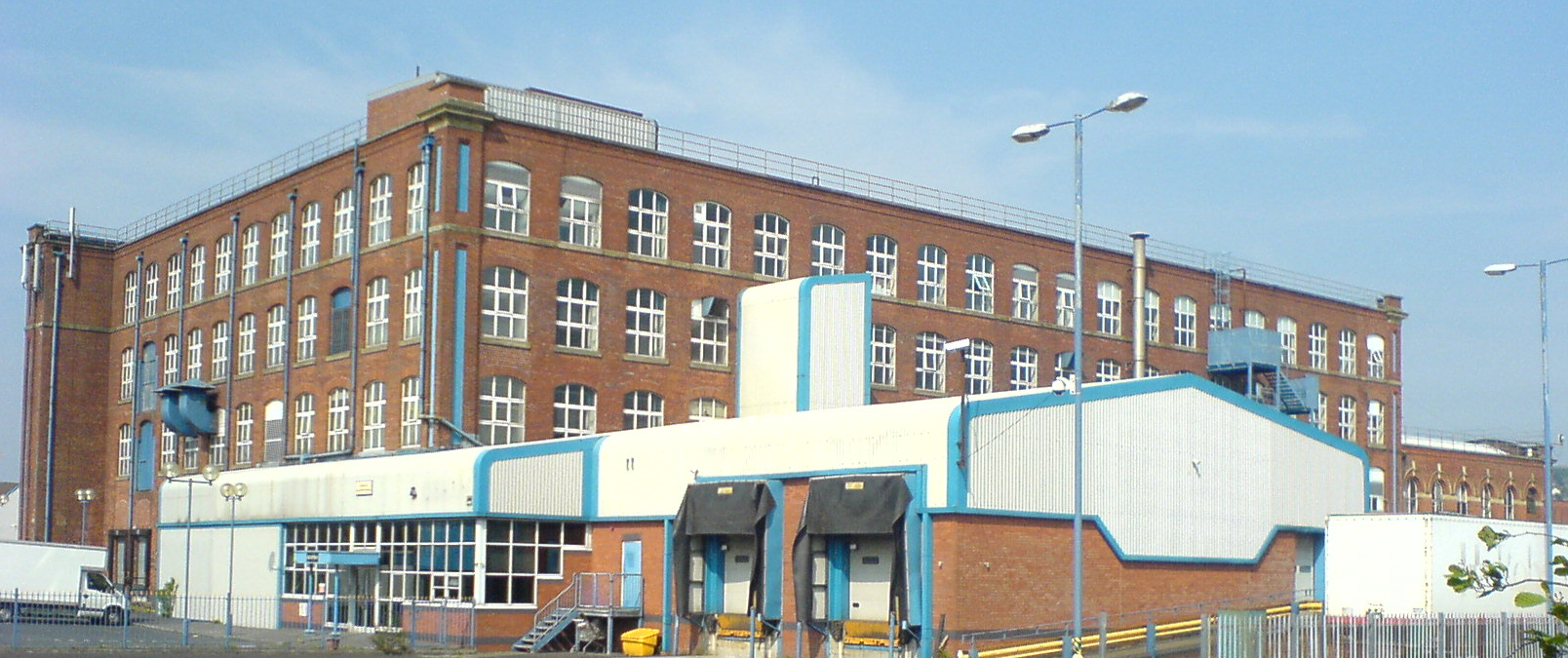
Duke Mill, Shaw, 1883, Joseph Stott.

Joseph Stott was born on 25 October 1836 in Oldham, the third son of James Stott and Mary Henthorn. In the Oldham archives are papers relating to mills designed by Joseph and his practice.

- Albion Mill, Bradshaw St, Oldham 1883–1884
- Alhambra Skating Rink, Bloom St, Oldham 1911
- Alma Mill, Scottfield St, Oldham 1878–1917
- Anchor Mill, Daisy St, Oldham 1881–1903
- Balderstone Mill, Oldham Rd, Rochdale 1919–1949
- Bank Top Mill, Edmund St, Oldham 1907
- Bardsley Holy Trinity Schools, Ashton-under-lyne 1929
- Barrowfield Mill, Reid St, Glasgow 1885
- Beal Mill, George St, Shaw 1886–1889
- Beevor Mills, Pontefract Rd, Barnsley 1887
- Bradley Fold Mill, Bolton 1908
- Brazil Mills 1917–1922
- Broadway Mill, Goddard St, Oldham 1882–1890
- Brook Mill, Millgate, Hollinwood, Oldham 1891–1935
- Buckley Brook Mills, (Buckley Lane), Rochdale 1889
- Fred Butler, shop premises in Huddersfield Rd, Oldham 1929
- Butler Green Mill, Wallis St, Chadderton 1903–1922
- Central Mill, Woodstock St, Oldham C1916-1956
- Chamber St Mission Hall, Oldham 1870s
- William Clegg, house at Balderstone, Rochdale early 20th century
- Coldhurst Mill, Rochdale Rd, Oldham 1875–1922
- Commercial Mill, Falcon St, Oldham 1883
- County Estate And Land Company, Edith St, Oldham 1905
- Crown Mill, Bentinck St, Oldham 1861–1926
- Devon Mill, Chapel Rd, Oldham C1907-1961
- Diamond Mill, Diamond St, Oldham 1881
- Diamond Rope Works, Cocker Mill Lane, Shaw 1912–1915
- Duke Mill, Refuge St, Shaw 1883–1885
- Egypt - Mill At Ramleh, Cairo 1892–1896
- Elm Mill, Linney Lane, Shaw 1890–1919
- Failsworth Premises Of George Whittaker Ltd 1927–1928
- Fern Mill, Siddall St, Shaw 1884–1941
- Firs/gladstone Mill, Oldham Rd, Failsworth 1875–1945
- Fleece Hotel, Manchester Rd, Oldham 1898
- Mill At Rheine, Germany 1882
- Glasgow Cotton Spinning Company Ltd, Swanston St, Glasgow 1883–1902
- Grange Mill, West End St, Oldham 1906–1907
- Gresham Mill, Main Rd, Oldham 1882–1960
- Healey Mill, Smallbridge, Rochdale 1876–1889
- F N Henthorn, house in Rochdale Rd, Shaw 1923
- Holyrood Mill, Windsor St, Oldham 1870s-c1920
- Honeywell Lane Methodist School Chapel, Oldham 1877
- Honeywell Mill, Ashton Rd, Oldham 1874–1943
- John Hulbert, Glansevern Estate, Welshpool, Wales 1917–1918
- Irk Mill, Oldham Rd, Middleton 20th century
- Kent Mill, Victoria St, Chadderton 1907–1937
- Lansdowne Mill, Crompton St, Chadderton 1884–1885
- Lees Brook Mill, High St, Lees C1884-1963
- Lily Mills, Linney Lane, Shaw C1904-1969
- Lodge Mills, Townley St, Middleton 1919
- Managers, Engineers, Carders And Overlookers' Society, Mumps, Oldham 1921
- Manor Mill, Victoria St, Chadderton 1906–1925
- Mons Mill, Burnley Rd, Todmorden, Yorkshire 1918
- Moorfield Mill, Durden St, Shaw C1876-1950
- Moorside And Parkfield Mills, Ripponden Rd, Oldham 1891–1960
- Napier Mill, Atkinson St, Oldham 1918–1919
- New Docks Steam Trawling Company (fleetwood) Ltd, Station Rd, Fleetwood 1915–1917
- North St Mills, Off Rochdale Rd, Oldham 1888
- Oak Mill, Spencer St, Oldham 1882–1883
- Oak View Mills, Off Manchester Rd, Greenfield, Saddleworth 1906–1914
- Oldham And Lees Spinning Company Ltd, Waterhead Mill, Oldham 1881–1888
- Oldham Brewery Company Ltd, Albion Brewery, Coldhurst St, Oldham 1889
- Oldham Estate Company Ltd, [waterhead], Oldham C1877-1880
- Oldham Municipal Technical School Extension, Ascroft St, Oldham 1925–1927
- Olive Mill, Quebec St, Oldham C1883-1945
- Osborne Mill, Robinson St, Chadderton 1924–1954
- S And L Patterson, house in Gorton St, Chadderton 1897
- Peel Mills, Chamber Hall, Bury 1885–1918
- Pine Mill, Sherwood St, Oldham 1880s-1941
- W H Platt, premises in Ashton Rd, Oldham 1898
- Regent Mill, Princess St, Failsworth 1904–1916
- Rochdale And Manor Brewery Ltd, Premises In Shore St, Oldham 1898
- Rochdale Cotton Spinning Company, Vavasour St, Rochdale 1884
- Rome Mill, Walkers Lane, Springhead, Saddleworth 1896-c1913
- Royton Spinning Company Ltd, High Barn St, Royton 1929
- Ruby Mill, Vincent St, Oldham 1887–1894
- Smallbrook Mill, Nolan St, Shaw 1906-c1940s
- Soudan Mills (also Don And Rex Mills), Oldham Rd, Middleton 1900–1956
- Standard Jacquard Company Ltd, Albert St West, Failsworth 1926–1927
- G Stott, "the Cottage", Boarshurst Lane, Greenfield, Saddleworth 1925–1928
- Summervale Mill, Fletcher St, Oldham 1881-c1940
- Sun Iron Works, King St, Oldham 1924
- Sun Paper Mill, Stanworth Rd, Feniscowles, near Blackburn 1890–1891
- William Taylor, shop at 159 Yorkshire St, Oldham 1898–1899
- Vale Mill, Beal Lane, Shaw 1918–1925
- Vale Mills, Clegg St, Oldham 1884–1907
- Vernon Mills, Mersey St, Stockport 1880s
- Warwick Mill, Oldham Rd, Middleton 1907–1911
- Waterford Mill, Factory Lane, Chippenham, Wiltshire C1911-1915
- R Watson, bungalow in Shaw Rd, Grains Bar, Shaw 1925
- Werneth Mill, Henley St, Oldham 1880-c1947
- Westhulme Hotel, Featherstall Rd, Oldham [1886]
- Lilian Whitehead, house in Bartlett Rd, Shaw 1926
- Whitworth Manufacturing Company Ltd, Albert Mill, Whitworth, Rochdale C1882
- Woodstock Mill, Meek St, Royton Junction 1919
- John Wright And Son, houses in Robinson St and Cow Mill, Chadderton early 20th century
- George H Wrigley, house in Chadderton 1901

== George Stott ==
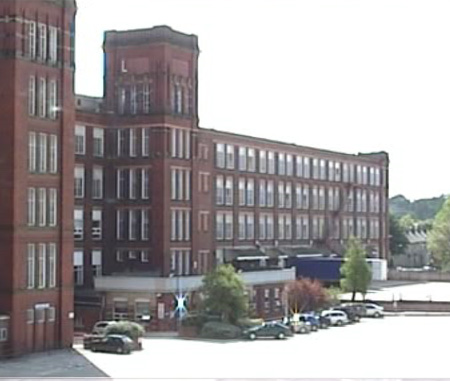
Lily No.1 Mill, Shaw, George Stott

The only son of Joseph Stott, George was born in Oldham in 1876. He was educated at Mr Binns' Highfield Academy and Manchester Grammar School. On Joseph Stott's death in 1894 George Stott took over his father's practice, trading as Joseph Stott and Son. George Stott adopted the triple brick arch system of flooring. His mills are known for their proportions and the meticulous detail of their facades. Manor and Kent Mills in Chadderton are two good examples. Another two are the Pine Mill and the Elm Mill (Newby). Stott designed mills in Ramleh Egypt and Brazil. He was a donor to the British Conservative Party. He died in December 1936.

== Abraham Henthorn Stott ==
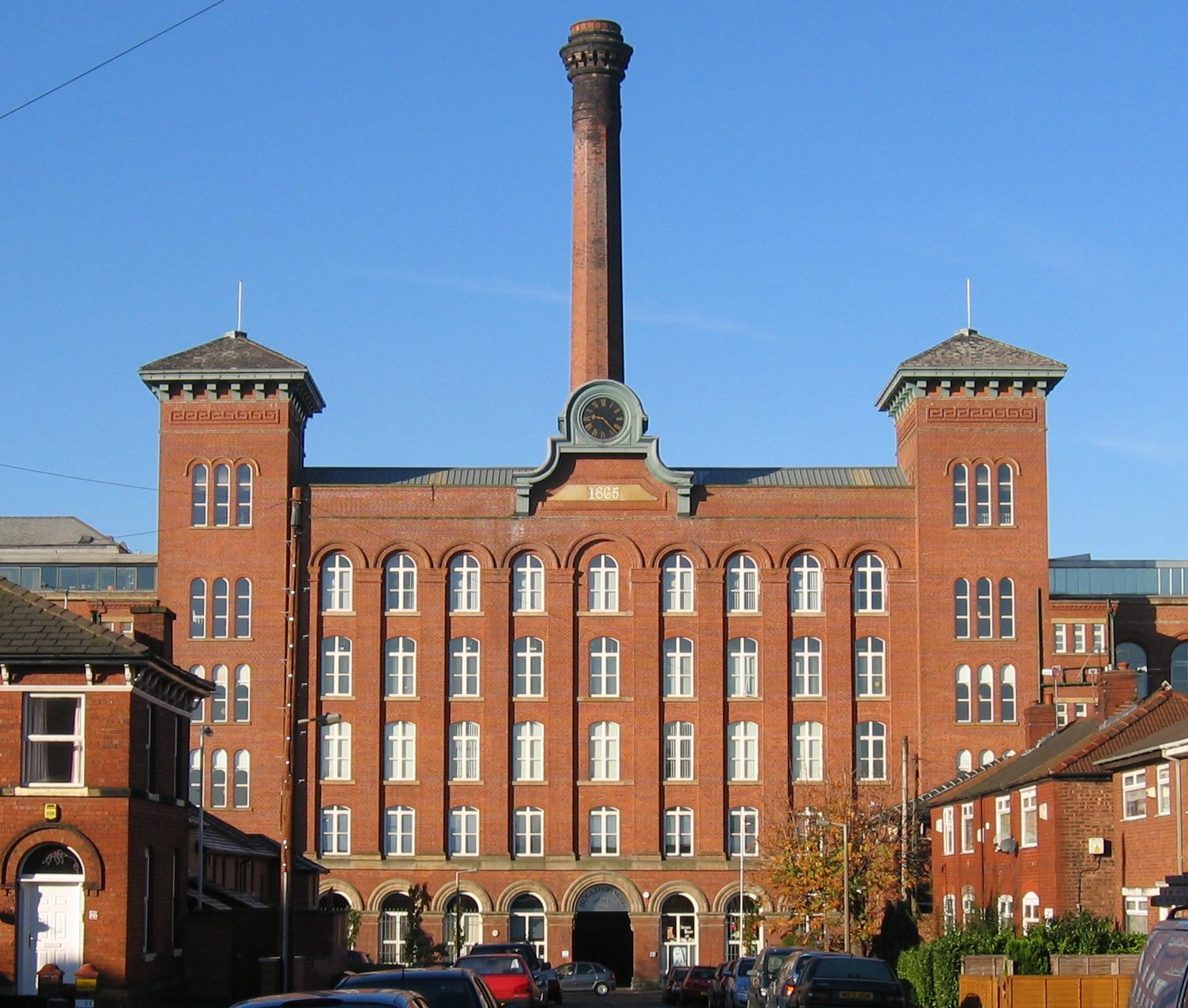
Houldsworth Mill, Reddish, A H Stott, 1865

Abraham Henthorn Stott was born on 25 April 1822 in the parish of Crompton. He served a seven-year apprenticeship with Sir Charles Barry, the architect of the Houses of Parliament and Manchester Art Gallery. He returned to Oldham in 1847 and founded the architectural practice of A H Stott and Sons, and was known for his innovative structural engineering. His brother Joseph Stott started his career here before leaving to start his own practice. After his retirement, the practice was renamed Stott and Sons. Three of his 9 children worked in the practice.

== Philip Sydney Stott ==
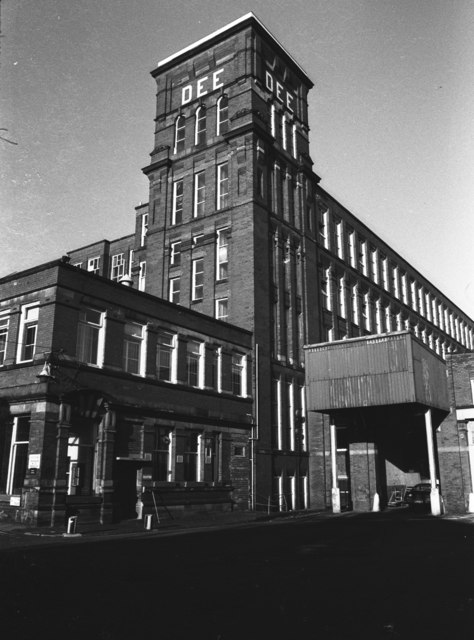
Dee Mill, Shaw,1907, P.S.Stott

Philip Sydney Stott (Sydney Stott) was the third son of A H Stott. He is regarded as Oldham's greatest architect. He established his own practice, P.S.Stott, in 1883. He was known as Sydney Stott until 1920, but adopted the title Sir Philip Stott on being made a baronet. He benefitted from the innovations made by his father and Edward Potts, another Oldham architect. His first mill design was for Chadderton Mill in 1885. Sydney designed 22 mills in Oldham and 55 elsewhere in Lancashire. His last design was the Maple No 2 in 1915. The mills accounted for 44% of the increase in the spinning capacity of the county between 1887 and 1925, and for 40% of the new spindles laid down in Oldham between 1887 and 1914. His mills accounted for 9 million spindles. He relied on the triple brick arches supported on steel beams favoured by George Stott, rather than concrete.

Stott was a Conservative and a freemason, he was president of the Oldham Lyceum and played rugby for Oldham Football Club. He held several directorships in the cotton-spinning industry. He moved to Stanton Court, Gloucestershire (near Broadway, Worcestershire), in 1913, where he became a Justice of the Peace and, in 1925, High Sheriff of Gloucester. He died in 1937.

== James Stott ==
James was a younger brother of Abraham Henthorn Stott, the son of James Stott. He set up a heating, ventilation, and catering equipment business that trades as Stotts of Oldham.

== Abraham Stott and Son ==
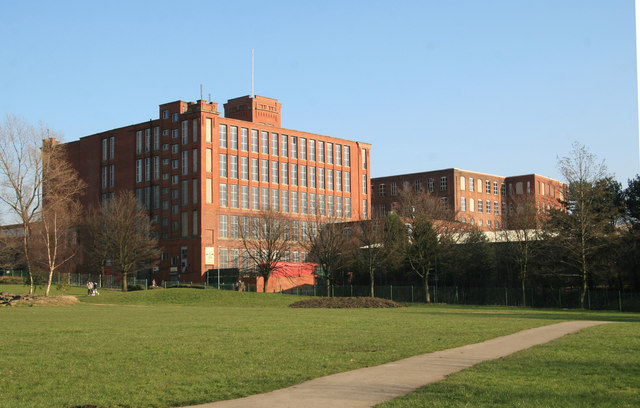
Osborne Mills, Chadderton. No. 1 to the rear was by A H Stott (1873), extended (1891, 1900), No. 2 was by P S Stott (1912) both closed 1968.

Abraham Stott and Son, set up by Abraham Stott, a cousin of Abraham Henthorn Stott, was a cotton-spinning company operating Osborne mill. Abraham Stott had a reputation for fairness and was nicknamed 'Honest Abe'. He invested in a clipper ship that traded with the confederate forces during the cotton famine; it was captured by the Union forces.
