= List of mills in Tameside =

This list of mills in Tameside, lists textile factories that have existed in Tameside, Greater Manchester, England.

From the Industrial Revolution until the 20th century, the towns of Tameside were a major centres of textile manufacture, particularly cotton spinning. During this period, the valleys of the River Etherow, River Tame and their tributaries were dominated by large rectangular brick-built factories, many of which still remain today as warehouses or converted for residential or retail use.

== Mills in Ashton-under-Lyne ==
Name	Architect	Location	Built	Demolished	Served (Years)
Albion		Lower Wharfe St			
	Notes: 1891-J. B. Reyner and Brothers, 147,000 spindles, 208/608; 1,300 looms				
Alger (see Curzon Mill)					
Ashton		River Tame 53°28′59″N 2°05′49″W	1788	1892	104
	Notes: A converted corn mill, driven by two 15 feet (4.6 m) waterwheels, initially used for carding. A new mill was built in 1788 20 yards (18 m) by 8 yards (7.3 m). In 1803 it contained carding, drawing and roving frames, and mule, throstle and water-frames. It was partially rebuilt in 1848. The joint stock company, The Manorial Spinning Co. Ltd occupied it for a few years about 1874. It closed in 1892.				
Atlas	P.S. Stott	Oldham Rd/Cranbourne Rd, Waterloo SD 935001 53°29′53″N 2°05′56″W	1900	1994	94
	Notes: 1900-Ashton Syndicate; 1930-Lancashire Cotton Corporation; 1994-Closed; Now housing estate				
Bank		SD 981033 53°31′34″N 2°01′48″W			
Bankfield		SJ 936986 53°29′02″N 2°05′53″W			
Banquet Mill see Junction mills					
Bardsley					
Bardsley Vale		SD 931,013 53°30′29″N 2°06′22″W			
Bengal					
Birch		Stockport Rd SJ 928,977 53°28′34″N 2°06′36″W			
	Notes: 1891-John Fletcher and Sons, 32,000 spindles, 328/408 twist				
Brasseys					
Bridge End		(Spring Grove)			
Bridge End		(Whitelands)			
Carrs (later known as Stamford Commercial Mill)		SD 952000 53°29′49″N 2°04′26″W			
Cavendish		SJ 935450 53°29′02″N 2°05′50″W	1885	Standing	141
	Notes: Converted into flats in 1994.				
Cavendish Street Mill		Cavendish St SJ 935710 53°29′06″N 2°05′49″W			
	Notes: Not to be confused with the nearby Cavendish Mill; 1891-Cavendish Spinning Co Ltd, 72,000 spindles, 328/408 twist, 168/468 weft and George H. Kenworthy and Son, 24,000 spindles, 248/408				
Cedar	P.S. Stott	Hurst SD 947001 53°29′51″N 2°04′52″W	1905	Demolished 1988?	
	Notes: 1905-Ashton Syndicate; 1921-Atlas Mills; 1930-Lancashire Cotton Corporation; 1960- Courtaulds				
Charlestown					
Cockbrook		Stalybridge Rd			
	Notes: 1891-Thomas Reyner and Sons, 31,000 spindles, 168/508 twist				
Co-operative					
Croft					
Cross Street					
Currier Slacks					
Curzon (later known as Alger Mill)	P.S. Stott	Cedar St, Hurst SJ 945680 53°29′45″N 2°04′55″W	1902		124
	Notes: 1902-Ashton Syndicate; 1911-Alger Spinning Company Limited				
Delamere Street					
	Notes: 1891-Thomas Hallam (spinner and doubler), 19,000 spindles, 608/1008.				
Duncan Street		53°28′33″N 2°06′38″W	1860		166
	Notes: 1891-Jonathan Andrew and Sons, Ltd, 60,000 spindles, 68/408 twist, 40/60° weft				
Egret			1824	2013	189
	Notes: 1881-Spinning mill burnt down - replaced by weaving sheds Office block still stands				
Fern		Charges St, Ryecroft	1895		131
	Notes: Extension of Ryecroft Mill. The mill is now owned by Hills Biscuits who have submitted a planning request for its demolition to make way for a new modern warehouse				
Flash Hall					
Foundry Street					
Gas Street					
	Notes: 1891-Thomas Mellor and Sons, Ltd, (together with Whitelands Weaving Shed), 58,000 spindles, 308/468 twist and weft; 755 looms,				
Gladstone					
Good Hope		Bentinck St SJ 933590 53°29′12″N 2°06′00″W	1824		202
	Notes: 1891-James Dyson, 28,000 spindles,40'/50' weft.				
Grey Street					
Grosvenor		Grosvenor St SJ 932981 53°28′48″N 2°06′14″W			
	Notes: 1891-James Knott, 30,000 spindles,168/508 twist				
Guide Bridge		SJ 923978 53°28′37″N 2°07′01″W	1876 & 1884		
	Notes: 1891-Guide Bridge Spinning Co Ltd, 150,240 spindles, 308/408 twist, 408/608 weft 1938-Earlier mill demolished.				
Guide		SJ 926976 53°28′30″N 2°06′47″W	1842		184
	Notes: 1891-James Kershaw and Co, (spinners and doublers), 56,000 spindles, 68/608 hosiery yarn, 20'/42' twist Upper floors removed				
Harper		SJ 944991 53°29′20″N 2°05′10″W	1855		171
	Notes: 1873-Rebuilt after fire Converted to apartments				
Hazelhurst					
Higham Fold					
Hurst		Queens Road SD 948520 53°29′56″N 2°04′39″W		Demolished	
	Notes: Now housing estate				
Hurst Brook					
Hurst Mount		SJ 942996 53°29′35″N 2°05′20″W			
James Ogdens					
Junction Mills		53°28′58″N 2°06′03″W	1831-1890	Demolished (exc. Chimney)	
	Notes: 1891-Samuel Heginbottom and Sons, 48,000 spindles, 32, twist, 40, weft; 1,126 looms				
Kenworthy's					
Knowles					
Lees Street		Turner Lane SJ 937980 53°29′36″N 2°05′37″W			
	Notes: 1891- Fisher and Jackson (doublers and commission reelers), 15,000 spindles, 308/1208 twist				
Leigh					
Manorial					
	Notes: 1891-Clarke and Vaughan (doublers), 13,000 spindles				
Mellors					
Minerva		Whitelands 53°29′N 2°05′W	1892	1937	45
	Notes:				
Oldhams					
Old Street					
Oxford		West End SJ 931,980 53°28′44″N 2°06′18″W	1845		181
	Notes: 1845-Thomas Mason; 1891-Thomas Mason and Son (spinners and doublers), 75,000 spindles.				
Park Bridge					
	Notes: 1891-Herbert Briggs and Co (doublers)				
Park Hall					
Portland Street		Portland St			
	Notes: 1891-Portland Street Mills Co Ltd, 48,000 spindles, 408 twist, 4011/508 weft.				
Ralph Ogdens					
Rock		Oldham Rd/Wilshaw Lane, Waterloo SD 932340 53°29′54″N 2°06′07″W	1893	1971	78
	Notes: Near Atlas. Built on site of Wilshaw Mill, using the Wilshaw chimney.				
Ryecroft		Ryecroft SJ 927983 53°28′52″N 2°06′40″W	1834		192
	Notes: 1891-Abel Buckley and Co, Ryecroft Mills; 59,000 spindles, 208/408 twist, 308/5 ft; 357 looms				
Ryecroft 2					
Stamford Commercial Mill (see Carrs)					
Stanley					
Tame Valley		SJ 948983 53°28′52″N 2°04′48″W			
	Notes: 1891-Tame Valley Thread Mills Ltd, 15,000 spindles				
Texas	P.S. Stott	Whitelands SJ 941810 53°28′58″N 2°05′16″W	1907	1971	64
	Notes: 1907-Ashton Syndicate; 1921-Atlas Mills Ltd; 1930-Lancashire Cotton Corporation; 1971-Burnt down				
Throstle Nest		SJ 942956 53°27′25″N 2°05′20″W			
Tongue Bottom					
Tudno Ryecroft 3					
Tudor	P.S. Stott	Portland Basin SJ 934250 53°29′00″N 2°05′57″W	1903	1970	67
	Notes: 1910-Ashton Syndicate; 1920s-Atlas Mills; 1930-Lancashire Cotton Corporation; 1970-Burnt down				
Union		SD981033 53°31′34″N 2°01′48″W			
	Notes: 1891-John and William Hame (together with Walk Mill), 92,500 spindles, 248/428 twist				
Victoria		Booth St SJ942967 53°28′01″N 2°05′20″W			
	Notes: 1891-Wrigley and Newton, 27,000 spindles				
Walk					
	Notes: 1891-John and William Hame (together with Union Mill), 92,500 spindles, 248/428 twist				
Waterside		SJ 944985 53°28′59″N 2°05′10″W			
	Notes: 1891-Waterside Mill Co Ltd, 34,602 spindles				
Wellington		Whitelands SJ 945986 53°29′02″N 2°05′02″W	1857		169
	Notes: 1891-John H. Gartside and Co Ltd, 76,128 spindles, 328 twist, 308/608 weft; 2,004 looms				
West					
Wharf Street		Wharf St SJ 938988 53°29′06″N 2°05′42″W	1825	1987	162
	Notes: 1891-John Knott and Sons, 84,000 spindles, 308/1408 carded and combed. 1987-Demolished and replaced by Asda Supermarket				
Whitelands		SJ 944985 53°28′59″N 2°05′10″W	1883		143
	Notes: 1891-Whitelands Twist Co, Ltd, 128,934 spindles 1930-Lancashire Cotton Corporation; 1938-A. V. Roe & Co. c. 1965-Sterling Moulding Materials				
Whittakers		SJ 949260 53°29′42″N 2°04′35″W			
Wilshaw		Wilshaw Lane			
	Notes: <1893-Replaced by Rock Mill				
Wood & Harrops					

== Mills in Droylsden ==
Name	Architect	Location	Built	Demolished	Served (Years)
Albion		Droylsden SJ 903860 53°29′05″N 2°08′42″W			
	Notes: 1891-Joseph Byrom and Sons, 22,548 spindles				
Angola Mill		Droylsden SJ 900400 53°28′42″N 2°09′00″W			
	Notes: 1851-Kay, Richardson and Wroe; 1891-W. P. Bellerby, 257 looms				
Droylsden Mills		Droylsden SJ 901260 53°28′39″N 2°08′56″W			
	Notes: 1891-Ashworth, Hadwen and Co, Limited, 39,000 spindles				
Edge Lane Mill		Droylsden SJ 891370 53°28′43″N 2°09′49″W			
	Notes: 1891-John Fletcher and Sons, 41,640 spindles				
Fairfield Mills (W.M. Christy and Sons Ltd)		Droylsden SJ 901460 53°28′47″N 2°08′55″W			
	Notes: 1891-W. M. Christy and Sons, 30,000 spindles and 710 looms				
Lumb (Littlemoss)		Droysden SJ 910580 53°29′29″N 2°08′05″W			
	Notes: 1891-Cryer Brothers, 45,000 spindles				
Oakfield		Droylsden SJ 904800 53°29′12″N 2°08′37″W			
	Notes: 1891- John Broadbent and Sons, 24,000 spindles				
Royal		Droylsden SJ 908980 53°29′18″N 2°08′14″W			
	Notes: 1891-Joseph Byrom and Sons, 45,000 spindles				
Saxon		Droylsden SJ 904260 53°29′07″N 2°08′39″W	1907	1995	88
	Notes: 1907-Saxon Mill Co (Ashton Syndicate); 1930s-Lancashire Cotton Corporation; 1964-Courtaulds; 1960s-Closed down 1995-Demolished				
Victoria Mill		Manchester Rd, Droysden SJ 899800 53°28′45″N 2°09′04″W			
	Notes: 1847-Henry Lees and Brothers; 1879-Victoria Spinning Co; 1891-Thomas Holt, 44,500 spindles 1893-Joseph Byrom and Sons				

== Mills in Dukinfield ==
Name	Architect	Location	Built	Demolished	Served (Years)
Albert	George Woodhouse	53°28′00″N 2°05′18″W	1873	1947	59
	Notes: Built by the Newton moor Spinning Co. in 1873-4, to plans by George Woodhouse. It was powered by a quadruple expansion engine by Adamson. It contained 48,000 spindles, but by 1911, it had 57,000 spindles. In 1920, it and its sister mill were taken over by Astley Mill Co Ltd a company running well over 200,000 spindles. Hard times and the mill stopped spinning in 1932.				
Albion Mills see Oxford Road Mill; Park Mill					
Alma Mill see Waterside Mill		53°28′58″N 2°05′48″W			
Aqueduct Mill /Dukinfield Mill		SJ 935984 53°28′56″N 2°05′56″W	1841		185
	Notes: The land between the Garforth's Private Branch Canal off the Peak Forest Canal and the River Tame, was sold to John Stanley an ironmaster for an ironworks. He speculatively built two cotton mills in 1841 on surplus land. Dukinfield mill was small, with four storeys running 13,584 spindles. In 1893 the mill changed its name to Aqueduct Mill, being leased by the cotton doubling firm of James Cooper & Sons. Doubling continued until around 1940. The mill was subsequently demolished.				
Astley Mill	Stott& Sons	53°28′10″N 2°05′20″W	1883	1935	48
	Notes: Built on share capital of 100,000 during 1883, by Aaron Haughton contractors to Stott and Son design. It was four storeys. The steam engine was a 1300 IHP, horizontal cross-compound with a seven-foot stroke. It powered a 34 feet (10 m) flywheel that ran 32 ropes. The engines were christened Beatrice and Constance after two daughters of Francis Dukinfield Palmer Astley.. It had 35 pairs of mules built by Taylor, Lang & Co of Stalybridge. It spun twist and weft. Opening and scutching machines were by the same firm, but the 70 double carding engines were by Asa Lees & Co. It was recapitalised in the 1920s and took over the Albert and Victoria Mills, thus had control of over 200,000 spindles. It went into liquidation in 1931, and was demolished in 1935 and the site used for housing.				
Astley Street Mill see Stanley Wood Mill		53°28′27″N 2°06′07″W ,			
Barrack Mill see Dukinfield New Mill		53°29′03″N 2°05′25″W			
Barn Meadow Mill	Robert Ashton	53°28′11″N 2°06′09″W	1834	1985	50
	Notes: Built about 1835, it was the first purpose built combined mill in Dukinfield. Run by Robert Ashton until 1857 it was then leased to Rowbottoms until 1864, then Messrs Woolnough & Kendal.				
Bow Mill see Dukinfield New Mill		53°29′03″N 2°05′25″W			
Bridge Eye Mill		53°29′05″N 2°05′33″W	1815	1910	72
	Notes: Bridge Eye is a loop in the River Tame. Robert Lees, see New Mill, built the first part of this mill in 1815. During the investment boom of the 1920s, Lees expanded the mills in 1822 and 1823, and again in 1827. In 1833 it was powered by three steam engines; two of 50 hp and one of 36 hp. It employed 1134 people, 487 spinning 40/60 counts, and the remainder weaving. Lees sons built the Walk Mill in Ashton- together the mills employed 1500. In 1874, the ageing factory was sold to Henry Gartside & Co. In 1884, when it closed, it contained 14,556 spindles and 761 power looms.				
Chapel Hill Mill		53°28′45″N 2°05′16″W	1792	1970	170
	Notes: Erected about 1792, its original purpose was probably a warehouse, it was first described as a mill in 1803 when it is assumed that a steam engine had been installed and in 1811 it ran 4320 mule spindles, It was run as a separate concern and combined with Oxford Road Mills. In 1833 it had a 12 hp steam engine. It stood empty for some years and working again in 1850. In 1854 it was damaged by a boiler explosion. By 1864 it had become a combined mill, but by 1874 spinning stopped and in 1884 it was a weaving shed with 428 looms. In 1886 it was taken over by John Henry Gartside and Co and occupied until 1908. The Winterbottom Book Cloth Company took over and 400+ looms were used until 1953, the mill closed in 1962 and was demolished in the 1970s.				
Crescent Mill see Dukinfield New Mill		53°29′03″N 2°05′25″W			
Dog Lane Mill see Dukinfield Hall Mill		53°28′15″N 2°06′05″W			
Dukinfield Mill (1835) see Aqueduct Mill		53°28′56″N 2°05′56″W			
Dukinfield Mill (1898) see Oxford Road Mills					
Dukinfield Hall Mill		53°28′15″N 2°06′05″W	1838	1895	56
	Notes: Owned by Abel Wimpenny, occupied by Messrs Gee & Hindley, then Hindley & Sutcliffe spinning 36 counts of twist and weft. From 1851 to the fire in 1864 it was Charles Frederick Hindley and Co. By 1868 the Dukinfield Hall Spinning Co was in occupation, it was incorporated in 1874 and was running 40,236 spindles of 32/54 counts. This produced 23,000 pounds (10,000 kg) of yarn a week. The company was wound up in 1894 and the mill demolished in 1895				
Dukinfield New Mill		53°29′03″N 2°05′25″W	1802	1933	131
	Notes: Built in 1802 as a steam-powered mill. In 1811 it ran 12,480 mule spindles powered by a 20 hp engine. In 1830 it was leased by Alexander Wylde Thorniley who employed 182 people, 121 in spinning and 61 on power looms. In August 1836 the lease expired and the mill became the barracks for the 10th, 20th and 38th Regiment of foot. It was back in cotton in 1845, occupied by James Ogden and Son. New mill was destroyed by fire in February 1866. At this time the main spinning block contained 5 storeys of 15 bays. The next owners were the Bow Mill Co. Ltd. who renamed it Bow Mill and ran 20,000 spindles. It was renamed again around 1896, when Bowker and Ball took over. They spun 24/40s of twist yarn. They stayed at Ćrescent Mills until December 1933, when it was destroyed by fire. Bowkers and Ball moved their business to the Tame Valley Mill, where they remained until 1996.				
Dukinfield Old Mill	extension Sidney Stott	SJ 945984 53°28′57″N 2°05′05″W	1792		161
	Notes: The earliest part of the mill was erected 1792, it was water powered. By 8111 it was occupied by Buckley & Binns and ran 5760 mule spindles, it was extended in 1818 and again in 1824. The owner was Cyrus Armitage, and then in 1826 by Robinson and Armitage. Power loom weaving started here in 1828, and in 1833 we know 173 people were employed here, 76 were spinning 36/40 counts and rest were power weaving. It was in this year that a stream engine was brought in to supplement the waterwheel that gave between 8 and 20 hp. Weaving was still recorded here in 1847. The mill was slightly altered to allow construction of Park Road in the 1850s. Owners changed and in November 1880 the mill suffered a serious fire. It was expanded again in 1891, and then in 1894 Sidney Stott built a further mill extension, with Adamson boilers. The older buildings were redundant- it appears the plan was to demolish them and extend the extension into a full mill. In 1895 there were 52,000 mule spindles, of which 45,000 continued in operation to 1953. The Stott mill was still standing in 1993.				
Furnace Mill		Bridge Eye 53°29′00″N 2°05′34″W	1792		234
	Notes: Landowner Mr Astley had a foundry on this site before 1784. Furnace Mill was built in 1792, its waterwheel was driven by a goit constructed across the Bridge Eye loop in the River Tame. In 1808 Furnace Mill was a five-storey, 92 feet (28 m) by 36 feet (11 m)main building with a three -storey 8 yards (7.3 m) square cotton warehouse. The mill was extended in 1825 and let out in two parts. The part occupied by Leigh & Leton had 17 carding engines and mules with 5400 spindles. James Ogden and Son ran this mill in conjunction with New Mill. It was destroyed by fire in August 1868.				
Old Barracks Mill see Dukinfield New Mill		53°29′03″N 2°05′25″W			
Old Hall Mill	rebuilt Sidney Stott	53°28′09″N 2°05′59″W	1864	1933	69
	Notes: It was a weaving shed suitable for 200 looms. It was built speculatively at the end of the Cotton Famine and occupied between 1871 and 1874 by William Young & Co and then Henry Bannerman & Sons of Stalybridge. It was extended, and by 1884 had 300 looms and at the time of the fire in 1906 it had 550 looms. It was rebuilt to plans from Sidney Stott. It was taken over by the Lancashire Cotton Corporation in 1930 and decommissioned, closing in 1933.				
Old Ship Mill see Furnace Mill		53°29′00″N 2°05′34″W			
Oxford Road Mills		53°28′37″N 2°04′48″W	1815	1937	122
	Notes: This was Hindley's Mill started in 1815. It was run from 1819 by Charkes Hindley. The first mill was known as Park Mill. Weaving was introduced in 1828. Major additions were made on the opposite side of Foundry Street, between 1833 and 1840. The Oxford Road and Park Mills sometime known as Albion Mills were sold around 1870 to Abel and Nathaniel Buckley. In 1884 the mills contained 50,000 spindles and 900 power looms, but weaving had ceased by 1898. Then the mills became the property of the Dukinfield Mill Co Ltd, some buildings were demolished and the remains renamed to Dukinfield Mill and spun coarse medium counts of twist and weft. Between 1911 and 1920 the mules were replaced with ring frames, there were 40,000 ring spindles. The mills closed on 1937 and were demolished.				
Park Mill see Oxford Road Mills		53°28′37″N 2°04′48″W			
Park Road Mill	AH Stott & Sons	53°28′56″N 2°04′58″W	1891	1995	74
	Notes: 1992 Image This company was an offshoot of the Astley Mill Co Ltd having the same directors. It was built alongside Old Mill on the banks of the Tame. It was a five-storey mill, the contractors being Messrs E. Taylor & Co of Littleborough. It was filled with 38 pair of mules carrying 92,280 spindles, serviced by 96 carding engines all by Asa Lees & Co. It was considered at the time to be a typical state of the art spinning mill and it featured in a series of articles on good practice in the Textile Recorder around May 1894. The power was provided by a pair of horizontal cross-compound triple-expansion engines by Benjamin Goodfellow of Hyde. They delivered 1500 IHP, to the shafts via a 30 feet (9.1 m) flywheel grooved for 45 ropes. It concentrated on spinning twists and weft from coarse counts of American cotton. Ring spinning was introduced by 1950 and by 1961 it had increased so there were 27,864 ring spindles and 17,664 mule spindles. It closed to cotton in 1965 and was subsequently used by ICL Computers Ltd but closed and was demolished 10 August 1995.				
Queen	Sidney Stott	53°28′38″N 2°04′53″W	1901	1983	58
	Notes: Designed by Sidney Stott, built by Messrs Storrs & Son, Stalybridge. 4 storey, 33-bay mill. 100,000 mule spindles supplied Howard & Bullough, and Taylor, Lang & Co. It was delivered by an inverted triple expansion 1800 hp with a 26 ft flywheel with 36 ropes, made by Scott& Hodgson. Queens Mill (Dukinfield) Ltd became part of Fine Spinners and Doublers in 1954.				
River Mill	Edward Potts	53°28′54″N 2°04′51″W	1877		57
	Notes: A four story mill built for Christian Koch near his Tame Valley Mill and the later Tower Mill. It had 45,000 spindles producing twist from American cotton. River & Tower Mills Co became a limited company about 1912 and were in work until 1934. The building found other uses				
St Helens Mill		53°29′00″N 2°05′26″W	1819	standing	57
	Notes: A set buildings started in 1819 by Joshua Binns, who had been working in Old Mill. A new section was added in 1824 and the buildings housed 18 pairs of mule with 9,936 spindles with 14 carding engines. In 1833 it used a 20 hp steam engine and employed 93 people. The third section was added by 1840 and it was possibly to house power looms introduced in 1836. In 1847 part of the building was in use to print fabric. It was occupied Jamieson, Kershaw William Young and between 1871 and 1876 by Joseph Clementson & Son. It ceased to be a cotton mill in 1876				
Stanley Wood Mill		53°28′27″N 2°06′07″W	1861	1906	35
	Notes: Or Aatley Street Mill, probably erected in 1861, it was occupied by Frederick Hindley, then Messrs Wood and Scholfield. It had a capacity of between 30,000 and 40,000 spindles but after 1888 it was only running 3000 doubling spindles. It closed in 1896 and was demolished by 1906.				
Tameside Mills	Edward Sigley & Sons; No.3 Potts, Son & Pickup	53°28′57″N 2°04′44″W	1852		85
	Notes: Built by the Chadwick family in 1852. The main block was six storeys. It was extended in 1857, 1860 and 1872 over doubling in size in 1884 it ran 102,000 spindles for spinning and doubling. In 1884 Potts Son and Pickup built the four-storey building known as No. 3 Mill by 1920 they were 115,596 mule spindles, 14,108 ring and 10,240 doubling spindles. This large enterprise closed in 1933, and all the buildings other than the No.3 mill were demolished				
Tame Valley Mill	Extension; B Morton & Sons	53°28′54″N 2°04′36″W	1853		143
	Notes: The mill was erected in 1853 by GJ Wainwright, formerly a spinner at St Helens Mill. It was a small four-storey mill with 26,000 mule spindles. In the early 1870s it was taken over by Koch & Co. They built a four-storey extension in 1909 increasing its spindlage to 43,000. In 1933 the mill was idle. Bowkers and Ball had been spinning 24/40s of twist yarn, at the Dukinfield New Mill (then named Crescent Mill) when, December 1933, it was destroyed by fire. Bowkers and Ball moved their business to the Tame Valley Mill, which was renamed to Crescent Mill. They remained until 1996 employing ninety people. It is still in operation in 2019, operating as a technical textile manufacturing business, Culimeta Saveguard.				
Tower Mill	Potts, Pickup & Dixon	SJ 951983 53°28′51″N 2°04′33″W	1885	standing	
	Notes: Built for Christian Koch, this 4-storey mill similar to River Mill, but more ornate being a Potts design. It had 44,000 spindles and 5000 twiner spindles, doing coarse counts from American. The River and Town mills Co Ltd (1912) ceased spinning at River in 1934, but by increasing the reliance on Ring spinning kept Tower going until 1955. On closure it had 13,000 mule and 24,000 ring spindles. The BBC One series Making Out was filmed at the mill and broadcast from 1989 to 1991.In 1996, Tower Mill’s historical importance was recognised by English Heritage, and it was given Grade II listed building status. In 2015 the mill was chosen as the new manufacturing site for English Fine Cotton. The company has invested £4.8m with a £1m grant from the Textile Growth Programme to restart cotton production in Manchester for the first time since the 1980's. In 2019, the mill is spinning cotton, uses new technology looms and produces cotton for high value products.				
Union Mill	Sidney Stott	53°28′21″N 2°06′10″W	1850	1883	−11
	Notes: Union Mill was built in 1850 to the east of the Peak Forest canal, and occupied by William, John and James Garforth. It span cotton and uniquely wove hose, which was traditionally only done in Nottingham. It was taken over by JE Lawton who just worked cotton. It closed suddenly in 1883.				
Victoria	George Woodhouse	53°28′05″N 2°05′22″W	1861	1947	71
	Notes: Built by the Newton moor Spinning Co. in 1861, to plans by George Woodhouse. It was powered by a twin triple-expansion engine by Daniel Adamson. It contained 57,414 spindles in 1878, but by 1911, it had 66,000 spindles. In 1920, it and its brother mill were taken over by Astley Mill Co Ltd a company running well over 200,000 spindles. Hard times and the mill stopped spinning in 1932.				
Warbrick's Mill	c.1825	53°28′59″N 2°05′37″W			
	Notes: Warbricks Mill was a very small mill – just 50 by 30 feet (15.2 m × 9.1 m) – built over the Furnace Mill Goit. It was probably built in 1825 and by 1845, the land was part of Furnace Hill Ironworks.				
Waterside Mill		53°28′58″N 2°05′48″W	1841	1914	73
	Notes: The land between the Portland Basin branch off the Peak Forest Canal and the River Tame, was sold to John Stanley an ironmaster for an ironworks. He speculatively built two cotton mills in 1841 on surplus land. Waterside mill was small, with four storeys, but unsuitable for longer mule frames. In 1896 the mill changed its name to Alma Mill, being leased by Leech, Hardy & Co. It was used for re-elling and winding and later doubling. It closed around 1914.				

== Mills in Hyde ==
Name	Architect	Location	Built	Demolished	Served (Years)
Bayleyfield Mill					
	Notes: 1891-Ashton Brothers and Co, Limited, with Carr Field and Throstle Bank, 114,580 spindles and 2,200 looms				
Carrfield Mill					
	Notes: 1891-Ashton Brothers and Co, Limited, with Bayley Field and Throstle Bank, 114,580 spindles and 2,200 looms				
Gee Cross		SJ 942937 53°26′24″N 2°05′20″W			
	Notes: 1891-Apethorn Mills Co, Limited, 40,000 spindles				
Gibraltar Mill					
	Notes: 1891-Gibraltar Mill Co Ltd, 28,674 spindles, 481 looms				
Greencroft Mill		SJ 944759 53°27′08″N 2°05′00″W		1990s	
	Notes: In an 1891 Hyde Directory (Worrall's?) it was listed as Cotton spinner and manufacturers called Hibbert and Aspland, Green Croft Mill it says that it had 26,668 mule and 1,480 ring spindles, 141/341 twist,161/421 weft; 541 looms, and made domestics, shirtings, drills and twills. In the 1930s, it was used by Crossley Motors who made buses. Demolished finally in the 1990s, the site is now a retail park.				
Greenfield Mill		SJ 946820 53°27′05″N 2°04′49″W			
	Notes: 1891-Horsfield and Co Ltd, 26,000 spindles and 451 looms				
Hyde		SJ 949820 53°27′55″N 2°04′32″W			
	Notes: Bought by the J.A. Pattreiouex company in 1960				
Providence		Alexandra Street SJ 944945 53°26′49″N 2°05′10″W			
	Notes: 1891- Robert Walker and Sons Ltd, 40,900 spindles				
Slack Mill		Hyde Lane SJ 952589 53°26′47″N 2°04′17″W			
	Notes: 1891-Slack Mills Co, Ltd, 58,892 spindles and 1,200 looms Taken over by the James North Company in 1960				
Throstle Bank		SJ 941109 53°27′24″N 2°05′19″W			
	Notes: 1891-Ashton Brothers and Co, Limited, with Bayley Field and Carr Field, 114,580 spindles and 2,200 looms				
Toray Mill				demolished	
	Notes:				
Wharf Mill				demolished	

== Mills in Mossley ==
Name	Architect	Location	Built	Demolished	Served (Years)
Bottom Mills		SD 975021 53°30′58″N 2°02′20″W			
	Notes: 1891-John Mayall, with Britannia, Southend and Scout Mills, 420,000 spindles				
Brunswick Mill		SD 978018 53°30′47″N 2°02′06″W			
Buckton Vale Print Works		SD 991009 53°30′18″N 2°00′54″W			
Carr Hill Mills		SD976025 53°31′08″N 2°02′17″W			
	Notes: 1891-Nathaniel Buckley and Sons, 84,600 spindles				
Carr Mill		Carrbrook			
Castle Mill		Carrbrook			
Castle Clough Mill		Carrbrook SD 982016 53°30′40″N 2°01′44″W			
	Notes: 1891-Alfred Howard, woollen manufacturer				
Clough Mill		Micklehurst Brook , SD 987021 53°30′58″N 2°01′16″W			
Croft Mill		SD 975020 53°30′54″N 2°02′20″W			
Doctors Mill		Micklehurst Brook			
Hollins Mill		Micklehurst Brook, SD980019 53°30′50″N 2°01′55″W			
Milton Mill		SD977025 53°31′08″N 2°02′10″W			
Scout Mill					
	Notes: 1891-John Mayall, with Britannia, Southend and Bottom Mills, 420,000 spindles				
Squire Mill		Micklehurst Brook			
	Notes: R. Radcliffe and Sons, woollen manufacturer				
Vale Mill		Micklehurst Brook SD984020 53°30′54″N 2°01′34″W			
	Notes: George Lawton and Sons, woollen manufacturer				
Woodend Mill		SD978027 53°31′16″N 2°02′06″W			

== Mills in Mottram ==
Name	Architect	Location	Built	Demolished	Served (Years)
Albion Mill		53°27′41″N 1°59′57″W			
Dry Mill- hand spinning/horse powered			1790		236

== Mills in Stalybridge ==
Name	Architect	Location	Built	Demolished	Served (Years)
Adshead's		53°29′01″N 2°03′33″W	1791		235
	Notes: A four storey mill built in 1791, housing hand operated mules. A steam engine (fire-engine) was mentioned in 1795. Then operated by Thomas Evans and then John Kershaw. It may have left cotton in 1818.				
Albion		53°29′02″N 2°02′59″W	1824		202
	Notes: James Bayley built the four-storey mill and six-storey mill in 1824 and 1825. A third four-storey mill built just after 1845 connected them. Robert Platt, bought the mills in the late 1850s and kept them until his death in 1882. They then had 56,000 spindles running fine counts. The successor 'The Albion Mills Co Ltd' continued through to 1983.				
Aqueduct		53°28′51″N 2°04′13″W	1823		203
	Notes: This started as a single 5-storey mill in 1823/4, by where the Huddersfield Narrow Canal crossed the River Tame. It was 23 bays by 14 yards. John Wagstaffe (Currier Slack, Ashton) built and ran the mill with Edward Sidebottom until around 1840, when Sidebottom took over the neighbouring Robinson Street Mill. About 1853 added a second mill only 8 bays long. In 1874 these mills had 30,354 spindles about 10,000 of these were on semi automatic mules, reputedly better for very fine counts. There were 3 steam engines giving 110 hp. The mill was extended by John Wagstaffe and Co Ltd and took 54,126 including 5640 ring spindles spinning warp and weft from American. In 1905 it passed to Storrs Mill Co Ltd who increased the ring spindles to 11,280. Aqueduct Mill Co (1927) took the mill through the difficult times and by 1938 was converted entirely rings, with 31,424 spindles. Cords Ltd took over in 1949, they spun American and Egyptian and also viscose and moved over to produce carpet yarns from viscose, wool and nylon. Aqueduct Mills were demolished in 1984.				
Aqueduct Higher see: Robinson Street Mill		53°28′48″N 2°04′10″W			
Bankwood a.k.a. Cheetham's		53°28′51″N 2°03′00″W	1831		195
	Notes: David and Cheetham of Castle Street Mills erected the stone built mill in 1831 as a combined mill, it was run together with Castle Street Mills and in 1871 they were employing 1400 workers. Alone in 1903, it had 1,200 looms and 42,000 mule and 16,000 ring spindles running medium and fine counts from American. George Cheetham and Sons, and then George Cheetham and Sons (1920) Ltd worked the mill until 1930 when it was sold to the Lancashire Cotton Corporation which closed it in 1935, and the buildings were put to other uses.				
Bannerman's Mills a.k.a. North End and River Meadow		53°29′26″N 2°02′43″W	1851		175
	Notes: North End Mill was erected in 1851 as a five-storey stone built mill with a single-storey weaving shed by James Adshead and Brothers. River Meadow Mill was a four-storey Mill built on the opposite side of the River Tame. They tried to sell them in 1863, then succeeded in selling them in 1864 to William Young and members of the Bannerman family. The mills were now used solely for spinning with 80,000 mule spindles. Bannerman Mills Ltd was formed in 1889 and included Brunswick Mill, Bradford, Manchester and Old Hall Mill, Dukinfield. The Stalybridge Mills produced medium-fine counts of twist and weft using Egyptian and American on 80,000 spindles. 18,720 ring spindle were added by 1920. They were all sold to the Lancashire Cotton Corporation in 1930 and been closed. North End Mill was demolished but River Meadow survived in other uses. Grade II Listed. It was used by Futura before they moved to Quarry Streetand then S. A. Driver warp knitters, dyers, printers and finishers. Now demolished.				
Bastille a.k.a. Chapel Street Mill see Rassbottom Mills		53°29′00″N 2°03′45″W			
	Notes: Lee's and Harrison 1797				
Bayley Field see:Bayley Street		{{coord}}			
Bayley Street		53°28′56″N 2°03′57″W	1830s	demolished	
	Notes: The Bayley brothers built a new combined mill on the other side of the river Tame to their existing mill in the early 1830s. It was designed by William Fairbairn, it had two floors, 1000 looms on the ground floor and 23,000 mule spindles on the first floor. The twin 110 hp beam engines were designed by Fairbairn. The flywheel was novel, power being taken off from a toothed rim. The beam engines were replaced by a 5000 hp marine engine. Henry Bayley alone was working the mill by 1871, and it was incorporated as Henry Bayley and Sons Ltd in 1875. It then contained 46,320 mule spindles and 1200 looms. It combined with Bridge Street Mill in 1883 and together they ran 99,300 spindles and 1700 looms. The worked medium counts of American into yarn and printing cloth. Benjamin Disraeli, in his novel Coningsby records a conversation with a stranger from Stalybridge and his mills. This would be William Bayley. The mills stopped between 1903 and 1906 and have been demolished leaving no trace.				
Bayley's Bridge Street		53°28′54″N 2°03′47″W	1812		214
	Notes: Built in 1812 by Joseph Bayley, and after his death run in the name of his wife Mary Bayley. The mill added power weaving in 1824. William, Henry and Charles ran the firm with their mother. By 1830 it was employing 263 in spinning and 322 in weaving. By 1836, there remained no land for expansion and a new mill was built on the other side of the River Tame. This was Bayley Street Mill.				
Bayley's Queen Street a.k.a. Hope Mill		53°29′04″N 2°03′35″W	c.1800		
	Notes: Built by Neddy all around 1800 when it contained about 9000 spindles and was leased in 1803 by Joseph and William Bayley. Joseph Bayley died here in 1811 when his arm was torn off by a blowing machine. At that time it had 10,500 mule spindles. James Bayley succeeded him running this and the larger Albion Mills until 1838. By 1841 Joseph Mills and Son were described as doublers and bobbin and skewer manufacturers, and the mill was known as Hope Mill. Demolished around 1900 when Waterloo Road was constructed over the mill.				
Bowling Green Mill aka King Street Mill		53°29′05″N 2°03′31″W			
Bridge Street Mills		53°28′52″N 2°03′53″W	1815	demolished	
	Notes: Seven-storey mill built in 1815 by the Platt Brothers George and Joshua, recently of Soot-poke.In 1831 it was inherited by Robert Platt who extended it and built the Quarry Street Mills. By 1882 Albion Mills. It was taken over by Robert Hyde Buckley and Sons and floated as a limited company in 1897 running 50,000 spindles doing Fine counts of Egyptian. It ran in cotton until 1953, and was then demolished.				
Castle		53°28′53″N 2°04′03″W	1891	2009	118
	Notes: Four-storey Mill on Dale Street built in 1891-2. Designed by Potts Son and Pickup. Carding machines by John Hetherington & Son, other preparatory machinery by Samuel Brooks, mules carrying 87,972 spindles by Taylor, Lang & Co. Weft and Twist from American medium counts. The 1400 IHP horizontal triple expansion engine by Yates and Thom ran a 30 ft diameter, 52 ton flywheel with 32 ropes at 60 rpm. Boilers were by Fernihough & Sons. It was taken over by the Lancashire Cotton Corporation in 1930 and closed. The mill was demolished in June 2009.				
Castle Street (Hall's) a.k.a. The Stone Factory		53°28′56″N 2°03′38″W	1815		211
	Notes: The first mill was a six-storey stone built mill from 1815 and extended in brick in 1824. It employed 187 in 1833. It had a 60 hp engine and spun coarse counts. The mill manager John Bates was taken into the partnership and he was succeeded by his son Ralph. They also had premises on Chapel St. This mill closed in 1883 and was used for warehousing.				
Castle Street Mills aka Longland's Mill		53°28′59″N 2°03′33″W	1805	in use	
	Notes: A mill with three lives. In its first incarnation from 1805 to 1896 it was a spinning mill run by the Cheethams, in its second incarnation from 1920 until 1961, it was known as Longlands Mill. In 2010 it is an apartment block, restored by Urban Splash and known as the Mill.: The first block was built by George Cheetham, (formerly of Lees Harrison & Co.) in 1805. It was probably a 4-storey building with 11,520 mule spindles powered by a 20 hp Boulton & Watt engine. The second block was larger and was built between 1821 and 1825: it was powered by a 36 hp Boulton & Watt. The third block, built 1826, was turned by two 20 hp Boulton& Watts. They employed 460 doing yarn for the hosiery trade. In 1832, expansion on this site stopped, as the Cheethams had bought Bankwood Mill. There were 28,000 spindles.; Longland Mill Company Ltd took over the mill and used it for doubling. There were up to 27,000 spindles. Rayon was introduced. The mill closed in 1961.				
Chapel Street aka Bastille see Rassbottom Mills		53°29′00″N 2°03′45″W			
	Notes: Lee's and Harrison 1797				
Cheetham's see: Bankwood		53°28′51″N 2°03′00″W			
Clarence aka Stamford Mill		53°28′59″N 2°04′24″W	1862		164
	Notes: Erected in 1862 during the Lancashire Cotton Famine by William and Henry Bayley as a work creation scheme. A five-storey brick building between Clarence Street and the Huddersfield Narrow Canal. Tall chimney. Robert and Joseph Byrom took over in 1871 and, by 1884 it had 70,000 spindles, in 1888 it had 75,000 spindles and by 1896 it had 90,000. It spun coarse to medium counts of twist and weft using Egyptian and American on mules and ring frames. In diversified into some wool and cotton mixtures in the 1930s, and post second world war, Robert Byrom (Stalybridge) Ltd was spinning cotton and rayon on 49,600 mule spindles and 42,060 ring spindles. It closed in 1960, the building with a truncated chimney still stands. It is now in multiple occupancy with the main block home to the Stamford Group.				
Copley		53°29′09″N 2°02′32″W	1827		199
	Notes: The buildings were erected in 1827 and had dual use for machine making and spinning 40 counts of twist. In 1883 James Wilkinson Ltd was running 51,000 spindles. In 1920 the buildings were empty, but in 1930 Robert Hyde Buckley and Son, a part of Amalgamated Cotton Mills Trust Ltd, were using the mills for cotton doubling. This firm continued to operate until 1974. Grade II listed, the buildings are in multiple use.				
Eagle see Phoenix		53°28′47″N 2°04′14″W			
	Notes: Cotton Waste in 1876 possibly.				
Garside's		53°29′06″N 2°03′38″W	1798		228
	Notes: Built in 1798 by Neddy Hall, it was soon owned by Samuel Garside and worked with John Brierley. It contained about 4000 spindles on twelve mules and was powered by 8 hp engine. It was probably demolished in 1840 to make way for the railway.				
Grosvenor Street Mills including Old Mill; Castle Mills; Clock Tower		53°28′53″N 2°04′03″W	1805		221
	Notes: Old Mill was built in 1805 by John Leech, it had a 14 hp Boulton & Watt steam engine and ran 9600 mule spindles. A combined mill was built next containing the first power looms in Stalybridge and the first to use gas lighting, the gas plant was built in 1818. John Leech was succeeded by his son John in 1822. The next combined mill was built in 1824, then a warehouse was built and converted to spinning in 1832. By then they had six steam engines delivering 158 hp and employed 1300. A further multi-storey mill was added about 1850 and the weaving sheds expanded. The expansion stopped about 1872 and in 1884 they contained 1855 looms and 102,000 spindles. It became a limited company in 1903 and started to introduce ring frames. By 1913 it has 33,400 ring spindles and 47,000 mule spindles and 1824 looms. The 1920s were bad. It was bought out in 1929 by the Lancashire Cotton Corporation, who had closed and demolished all the building with exception of the Clock Tower Mill, by 1934. This continued in cotton until 1955.				
Hen-cote		53°29′00″N 2°03′40″W		1845	
	Notes: Few details other that the location and that it had been demolished in 1845				
Heyrod		53°29′37″N 2°02′33″W	1788	c.1930	
	Notes: An Arkwright type mill built on the Tame by Faulkner., Brown and Etchell in 1788. It was a five-storey mill 17 yards by 9.5 yards. It started with water frames. A second mill was added in 1804 by Ousey- it was designed for mule spinning, being 3.5 yards wider. In 1806 a combination of Mule and Throstle spinning was being done with 24 mules carrying 6072 spindles, 16 throstles carrying 1,664 spindles and 15 carding engines. A third fireproof mill had been added by the new tenants Judson Ousey. So in 1830, the 52 throstle frames were producing 1000 lbs of twist yarn a week and the 30 mules producing 1000lbs of weft a week. They were converted into a print works around 1850 and known as the Harthead Works. The mills came into the hands of the Calico Printers Association and were demolished around 1930.				
Higher		53°29′11″N 2°03′05″W	bef. 1775		
	Notes: Built on the Tame on the Cheshire side upstream from Lower Mill originally as a fulling mill for woollen, it was in place by 1775. It came over to cotton around 1803 when it contained 4,800 spindles, hosting James Boyer and William Earnshaw, probably using throstles. One part was four storeys of 68 ft by 28 ft, and the other was three storeys of 38 ft by 40 ft. The fall on the river at that point was 13 ft. The first fire was in 1827, but the rebuilt mill was occupied by James Hall, of King Street Mill in 1836, and steam power was being used. The second fire here was in March 1873 when a centre shaft on the third floor overheated and 60 people lost their jobs. Only 11,000 spindles of a possible 30,000 were in use. The site was obtained by the North of England Paper Manufacturing Company, that was incorporated in 1874. The new multi-storey paper mill building was standing 1990.				
Hollins		53°28′45″N 2°04′06″W	1826	bef. 1896	
	Notes: An 1826 mill built by Joshua Platt had four storeys and an attic. It was 64 ft by 40 ft. Even in 1882 when it closed, it was running throstle frames and mules, and had a dye plant. It was demolished by 1896 and has been built over.				
Hope see: Bayley's Queen Street Mill		53°29′04″N 2°03′35″W			
Kershaw Wood		53°29′01″N 2°03′55″W	mid 1830s	demolished	
	Notes: Built in the boom of the mid-1830s, it was sold partially fitted up in 1837 with a 60 hp engine and space for 40,000 spindles. It had several owners before it was bought in 1878 by the London & North Western Railway Company and demolished to make way for a station that was never built.				
King Street		53°29′05″N 2°03′31″W	c.1800	bef. 1862	
	Notes: Built by James Mellor around 1800, and doubled in size in 1803 when in contained 5600 spindles. Ownership passed to James Hall in 1832, his sons built a new mill on the opposite side of King Street in 1850. The new mill was in cotton until the 1870ś and was demolished before 1892.				
Lilley's		53°30′N 2°06′W	1790	c. 1857	
	Notes: Until 1802, a horse gin provided power for this Woollen Mill, that was erected by Nicholas Lilley in 1790. The steam engine bought in 1802 was the earliest to be used in the district. In 1807 he went bankrupt leaving the mill that contained some cotton spinning equipment. It was converted into cottages that were demolished about 1857.				
Longland's see Castle Street Mills		53°28′59″N 2°03′33″W		in use	
	Notes: Converted into apartments by Urban Splash				
North End; Bannerman's Mills		53°29′26″N 2°02′43″W			
Oakwood; New Mill, Millbrook		53°29′37″N 2°02′03″W	1851	derelict	
	Notes: Erected in 1851 in Millbrook as the New Mill for the Staley Mill Co, which became the Millbrook Spinning Co. It was a stone-built four-storey spinning mill doing medium counts of twists from American. It started with a beam engine but this was replaced in 1908 with a Yates and Thom triple expansion engine. Rope dives were installed and new boilers. In 1911 it drove 59,000 mule spindles and 7000 ring spindles. It stopped spinning in 1962 when it passed over to the Dukinfield Bleaching Company. The engine room was covered completely with white tiles. Now derelict.				
Old Street		53°29′01″N 2°03′18″W			
	Notes: This could have been one of two mills in existence in 1790: a former corn mill or a former woollen mill known as 'Old Greasy'. It had a drawing-frame: no further information known.				
Phoenix		53°28′47″N 2°04′14″W	1831-69		
	Notes: Built between 1831 and 1845 in Tame Street, co-located with the Eagle Iron Works. Evidence of Cotton Weaving around 1869 to 1872.				
Premier		53°28′51″N 2°04′24″W	c.1906		
	Notes: An unusual single-storey combined mill designed by Sidney Stott in 1906. The shed contained 21,000 ring spindles and 1017 looms. The line shafts were driven by nine 60 HP, and three 150 HP 3-phase, 400 V electric motors. The chief engineer of the nearby Tame Valley SHMD generating station was appointed consulting engineer to Premier Mill Ltd. The syndicate of owners also owned Victor Mill and Ray Mill. In 1911 the three companies merged too form Victor Mill Ltd. The firm employed 1500 people, Premier was spinning coarser counts of twill and weft, and weaving printers shirtings and twills. from American cotton. By 1950 the company was part of the Fine Spinners and Doubler Association, and was taken over by Courtaulds in 1960 and still in production until 1982. The mill was standing in 1990.				
Quarry Street		53°28′45″N 2°03′57″W	1834	demolished	
	Notes: The first mill was a 6-storey 15-bay brick built mill erected in 1834 by Robert Platt who was expanding his operation from the Bridge Street site. The second mill was built between 1845 and 1872 by Platt who also owned Albion Mill, Platt died in 1882. Robert Platt Ltd, chaired by Frederick Platt-Higgins spun fine counts of twist and weft on 66,316 spindles. No 1 Mill was destroyed by fire in 1915 but rebuilt on the insurance money in 1916, it is surmised that the architects were Potts & Hemingway. The firm survived, joining the Fine Spinners and Doubler Association in 1938 with 90,000 spindles. The mill was later occupied by the Futura Rubber Company Ltd. a manufacturer of footwear which ceased trading in 1995. The mill has been demolished and replaced by housing.				
Queen Street		53°29′05″N 2°03′33″W	1804	c. 1906	
	Notes: A 14 hp Boulton and Watt engine was installed in the new mill in 1804 for Thomas Lees in partnership with John Brierley. It was destroyed by fire in May 1823, probably caused by the overheating of a shaft in the blowing room. The engine and the mill opposite were saved. The new mill was 5 storeys, 29 yards by 13 yards. It had a succession of tenants and by 1868 was i use for doubling being too narrow for modern mules. It was run in conjunction with Bankwood Mill. The 12,500 doubling spindles were supplied by Platt Brothers. It was bought around 1881 by the London & North-Western Railway Company for a planned but not built extension. It was demolished shortly after 1906.				
Rassbottom Mills		53°29′00″N 2°03′45″W	c. 1800	part demolished	
	Notes: A collective term for all the mills at Rassbottom in Stalybridge. These include Lees', Harrisons', Hencote, Water Street Mill, Castle Street Mills. It was presumed that it was the water power potential of this site that attracted the Lees brother and Harrison that purchased the site from Samuel Ousley in July 1795. They had already built up capital from cotton elsewhere. Chapel Street Mill 1797, bought a 40 hp Bateman & Sherratt steam engine in 1899. With a second mill, they had 34,000 spindles in 1803 making it the largest concern in Stalybridge or Ashton. A fire on 28 December 1804 destroyed the older mill. Lees & Harrison rebuilt the mill with 24,960 mule spindles. George Cheetham and John Leech left the partnership and built a mill on Castle Street. By 1816 Lees and Harrison split, Harrison running the older mill with his sons, The Harrisons expanded and added a new 6-storey mill fronting Chapel Street with an 80 hp Boulton & Watt engine with a 7 ft stroke running a 24 ft flywheel. They bought more engines and retired the Bateman & Sherratt to King Street, where it ran until 1859. In 1833 Harrisons had 220 hp of steam, from four engines, 3 of which were Boulton & Watt and 15 hp from a waterwheel. They employed 1300, of which 750 were weaving. John Lees with his son Jeremiah took the rebuilt new mill, and expanded in 1816, 1820, 1821 etc. These mills were run by John Lee and Son until 1847. They had 110 hp from 3 engines employing 796 hands. They were taken over by Henry Johnson and Sons, cotton spinners and manufacturers of shirtings and printing cloth. They built the Johnsons Side Mills on the Cheshire side of the River Tame in 1854, a 3-storey spinning block and more weaving sheds. In the 1870s the London & North-Western Railway bought most of the mills on the Lancashire side and demolished them for a goods yard that was never constructed. Some mills transferred to James Hall, Son & Co, but became disused in the 1880s and were demolished. The remaining mills became owned by Thomas Ashton Harrison & Co. There was more expansion for example off Caroline Street. In 1911 there were running 1,347 looms, 27,000 mule spindles and 44,000 ring spindles. By 1921 they were running 1,356 looms weaving domestics, plains, twills and sheeting, and spinning medium counts of twist and weft from American on 8400 mule and 58,600 ring spindles. They closed in 1933. The mills on the Lancashire side were demolished, while the Caroline Street mills are still standing.				
Ray		SJ 952983 53°28′54″N 2°04′27″W	1907	2018	111
	Notes: A five-storey, electrically driven red brick spinning mill built in 1907. It contained 66,528 ring spindles and 9000 doubling spindles. Together with Premier Mill it was using 3,050 horsepower (2,270 kW) of electricity. The syndicate of owners also owned Victor Mill and Premier Mill. In 1911 the three companies merged to form Victor Mill Ltd which employed 1500 people. Ray was spinning medium counts from American cotton. By 1950 the company was part of the Fine Spinners and Doubler Association, and was taken over by Courtaulds in 1960 and was still in production until 1982. The mill was destroyed by a fire on 17 March 2018.				
River Meadow; Bannerman's Mills		53°29′26″N 2°02′43″W			
Riverside		53°29′13″N 2°02′55″W	1884	in use	
	Notes: A weaving shed built in 1884 designed by Stott and Sons. It had 1200 Looms by Eli Cryer & Co with other machines by Dickensons of Blackburn, powered by a 450 IHP engine by Wainwrights of Stalybridge. It struggled by being outside the main weaving area. It was taken over four years later by Jackson & Steeple of Mossley, who in 1893 installed a few thousand ring spindles. In 1911 it had 4,000 ring spindles; 854 looms. The mill was now viable and worked as a combined mill until 1930 when the rings were abandoned. In 1952 it was re-equipped with 800 Northrop automatic looms. It closed in 1962 but the building survived as part of a now far larger factory.				
Robinson Street Mill aka Aqueduct Higher Mill aka Nuttall's Mill		53°28′48″N 2°04′10″W	1824	1920s	
	Notes: The first small mill was built by Daniel Howard in 1824 close to the Outred aqueduct over the Tame. It was not successful and was sold containing 14 pairs of mules holding 8000 spindles. Around 1840 John Wagstaffe and Edward Sidebottom took over this mill and Aqueduct Mill. The mill was run by Edward Sidebottom & Sons, and later in 1882 by the Stalybridge Spinning and Doubling Mills Ltd. There were two main blocks one of 3 storeys and one of 5 storeys. They contained 46,000 mule spindles and 4,200 twiner spindles turned by two beam engines and two John Petrie & Co horizontal together will 486 hp. Then it was Hulme Spinning Co Ltd and in 1901 C.H.Nuttall and Co Ltd who introduced an additional 20,000 ring spindles. Extra floors were added in 1904 and it ran 72,000 spindles, 38,000 being in ring frames. It closed and was demolished in the 1920s.				
Soot-poke		53°29′05″N 2°03′40″W	1776	1824	48
	Notes: A small mill, the size of a cottage built in 1776, this was the first cotton mill in Stalybridge. Built by a Mr Hall, the carding machine was powered by a water wheel. The spinning jennies were operated by hand. A steam engine, or fire engine as it was then called, was installed in 1790/1. It was a 6hp engine, with a square rough wood beam. The factory gained the name of the Soot-poke (poke meaning pocket). By 1803 it had been extended and was operated by George and Joshua Platt who stayed with the 4200 spindles until 1816. It burnt down in 1824.				
Spring Grove		SJ 976999 53°29′46″N 2°02′17″W	1818	1882	64
	Notes: The last purpose built water mill, in 1818, on John Howards land on the Swineshaw Brook. 115 people were employed at this five-storey mill spinning forty count. the 20 hp waterwheel was supplemented by a 10 hp engine. Expanded a little, it was sold for woollen in 1868. The building burnt down in 1882, but woollen manufacture continued in the new buildings on the site until 1969.				
Staley		SJ 977250 53°29′32″N 2°02′03″W			
Staley Mill (Howard's) aka Swineshaw Mill aka Castle Hall Mill		53°29′29″N 2°01′54″W			
	Notes: An old corn mill that converted about 1800 and owned by William Bayley. It had 5000 spindles in 1811. There was a fire, it was rebuilt by James Adshead in 1815 and sold in the 1820s to Richard Buckley and Co, then Buckley and Howard. In 1833 they were employing 82 spinning 40 counts. Power was by a combination of water and steam-using 12 hp. In 1865 it was still operating hand operated mules holding 11,3238 with 4,284 spindles on self-actors. Then it had 120 hp steam and 22 hp water. Howard had another mill on Swineshaw Brook. When Bagshaws took over the mill after the Cotton Famine it was named Swineshaw Mill, and the firm became Swineshaw Twist Co Ltd running 22,000 spindles. It came out of cotton in 1896, and went into woollen, and the mill was renamed as Castle Hall Mill: it was working until 1962.				
Staley New Mills		53°28′58″N 2°02′46″W		1983	
	Notes: These mills were demolished about 1983, having been out of cotton since 1896. They were built by the Adsheads as their 'new mill' in 1824; it employed 209. The second mill was built in the 1830s and slightly smaller- together they had 58,000 spindles.				
Stalybridge		53°28′57″N 2°03′52″W			
Stone Factory		53°28′56″N 2°03′38″W			
Swineshaw		53°29′29″N 2°01′54″W			
Valley		53°28′11″N 2°02′23″W		demolished	
	Notes: A stone built woollen mill with 4 storeys, 11 by 18 yards, and attic on the Acres Brook. which powered a water wheel from a 30 ft fall. There was a reservoir. It was expanded. By 1827 a supplementary waterwheel had been added. By 1838 it had been bought by Samuel Hyde and was spinning cotton, using mule frames with 7000 spindles made by Hibbert & Platt of Oldham. It was sold in 1841, without the steam engine. The mill disappeared from records between 1872 and 1896 although the reservoir remains.				
Victor		53°28′48″N 2°04′20″W	1903	1985	82
	Notes: A fine Edwardian four-storey Sidney Stott Mill (1903), the first in Stalybridge built entirely for ring spinning. The 77,000 spindles were powered by a 1500 IHP George Saxon, inverted vertical triple expansion. The syndicate of owners also owned Premier Mill and Ray Mill. In 1911 the three companies merged too form Victor Mill Ltd. The firm employed 1500 people, Victor Mill was spinning twist yarn from American and Egyptian cotton. By 1950 the company was part of the Fine Spinners and Doubler Association, and was taken over by Courtaulds in 1960 and still in production until 1982. The mill was demolished in 1985.				
Water Street		53°29′01″N 2°03′36″W	1797	bef. 1896	
	Notes: Built in 1797 by John Orrell on the River Tame, it was a purpose built steam powered mule mill powered by a 10 hp Boulton & Watt 15 ft beam engine with a stroke of 4 ft driving a 12 ft flywheel. Various tenants went on to build other Tameside mills. It had 13,000 mule spindles in 1811. A further 36 hp Boulton and Watt was ordered in 1819 and the 10 hp was bought by Mr Thornley, of Hadfield. Though becoming an asset of a joint stock company in 1867, it had been demolished by 1896.				
Wareing's		53°28′55″N 2°03′45″W	1821		205
	Notes: A small mill built in 1821 near the Huddersfield Canal Wharf on Bridge St. It was run by John and William Wareing until 1852 when it passed to the Thackerays who worked it to 1903. It was a 5-storey mill with attic, with 10,824 spindles. It ceased spinning in 1896 and remained standing in other uses until 1970.				

== Others ==
Name	Architect	Location	Built	Demolished	Served (Years)

== Bibliography ==
- Ashmore, Owen (1982). The industrial archaeology of North-west England. Manchester University Press. ISBN 0-7190-0820-4.
- Haynes, Ian (1987). Cotton in Ashton. Tameside Metropolitan Borough. ISBN 0-904506-14-2.
- Haynes, Ian (1990), Stalybridge Cotton Mills, Neil Richardson, ISBN 978-1-85216-054-8
- Haynes, Ian (1993), Dukinfield Cotton Mills, Neil Richardson, ISBN 1-85216-080-2
- Naismith, Joseph (1894), Recent cotton mill construction and engineering, Manchester: John Heywood
- Williams, Mike; Farnie (1992). Cotton Mills in Greater Manchester. Carnegie Publishing. ISBN 0-948789-89-1.
