= Sunspel =

English clothing company

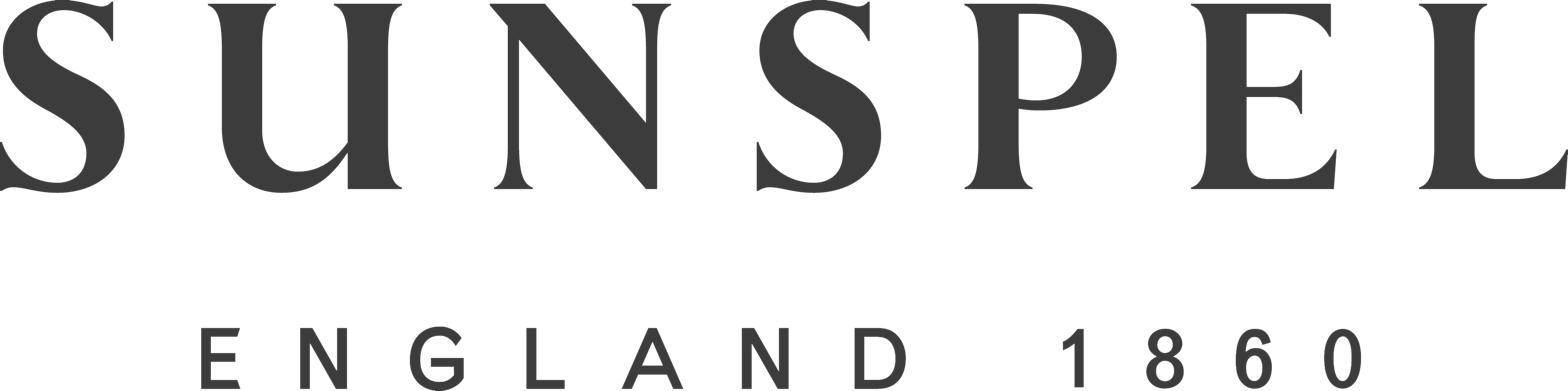
- Industry: Fashion
- Founded: 1860
- Founder: Thomas Arthur Hill
- Headquarters: UK, Long Eaton, Derbyshire
- Products: Clothing
- Website: www.sunspel.com

Sunspel is an English luxury clothing brand, founded in England in 1860. The brand is best known for boxer shorts, T-shirts and polo shirts. It is based in Long Eaton, near Nottingham, where it has its own factory.

== History ==
=== Early years ===
Sunspel's origins date back to the mid-nineteenth century when the firm began crafting high-quality underwear in Nottingham - then the centre of the British lace and hosiery industry - from cotton, merino wool and silk. The firm was previously named Thomas A. Hill Ltd after the owner, Thomas Hill who was a well-known industrialist. Hill moved the firm from its original factory in Back Lane, Nottingham to a much larger building in Castle Gate, Nottingham.

With Hill's innovative direction, the new factory brought several marked improvements to working conditions including factory lighting, sanitation and fire prevention systems. Hill was among the first to introduce state-of-the-art steam-powered machinery to Nottingham's hosiery industry.

Under his guidance the company grew significantly and earned a reputation for exceptional quality. Towards the end of the century, the brand began using Sea island cotton, the world's rarest and finest extra-long staple cotton.

=== 20th century ===
At the beginning of the 20th century, the company began making and selling some of the world's first T-shirts. Originally undergarments, they were designed to be cool and comfortable in the heat of tropical climates and were made with a high-quality Sea island cotton jersey fabric. Upon Hill's death in 1909, he passed on the company to his son, also named Thomas Hill, and the business remained in the Hill family for the rest of the century. The brand continued its dedication to fabric innovation and in 1914, invented a unique cellular cotton fabric which was made on traditional lace machines and used for lightweight underwear, and it is still in the collection today.

In 1935, the company was officially renamed Sunspel. The name was inspired by the quality control stamp of Sea Island cotton (with which the brand had become synonymous), featuring a sunburst through clouds.

The company moved its manufacturing base from Nottingham to nearby Long Eaton, Derbyshire, in 1937 and it has remained in the same factory ever since. During the Second World War, Sunspel produced underwear and long johns for the war effort under the CC41 utility mark.

In 1947, John Hill, the great-grandson of founder Thomas Hill introduced the boxer short to the United Kingdom. He discovered the underwear style on his honeymoon in the United States and modified the design by adding a back panel, flattening the seams and using the highest quality cotton. The underwear style gained widespread popularity after the 1985 Nick Kamen Levi’s advert in which he wore Sunspel boxer shorts.

From the 1950s, the brand was stocked in renowned department stores such as Liberty of London, Harrods and Selfridges.

=== 21st century ===
In 2005, Hill's great-grandson, Peter Hill, sold the company to a former barrister, Nicholas Brooke. He sought to modernise the brand, without losing the appeal of its historical heritage.

Shortly afterwards, Sunspel was approached by the award-winning costume designer and stylist Lindy Hemming, whose brief was to update James Bond's style as part of a reboot to the franchise. She tailored Sunspel's Riviera Polo Shirt to fit Daniel Craig for Casino Royale. Craig wore Sunspel Riviera T-shirts which were also tailored to him. Hemming said of the brand:

“[For Casino Royale], I thought it would be a perfect collaboration of quality and Britishness to ask Sunspel to create all [Bond's] T-shirts, polo shirts and underwear, which they duly did, excellently. He looks very sexy and happy in their clothing.”

Jonathan Anderson, who went on to become creative director for Loewe and founded his own eponymous fashion label JW Anderson, was the creative director for Sunspel between 2009 and 2014 and introduced the Loopback Sweatshirt to the collection. More recently, Sunspel has collaborated with several British artists and designers such as Paul Weller, David Shrigley, and Charlie Casely-Hayford. In 2022 it collaborated with supermodel Edie Campbell for a womenswear capsule. Sunspel has also collaborated with a number of leading brands including Comme des Garcons, Lemaire, and Paul Smith.

To this day, Sunspel still operates from its Long Eaton factory where it has been based since 1937. The factory employs approximately 50 people and it is where Sunspel handmakes its Classic T-shirts. The brand continues to be stocked in leading global retailers and has its own retail stores worldwide.

== Notable products ==
=== T-shirts ===
The earliest garments that Sunspel produced were tunics and undershirts, which were manufactured in their Nottingham factory at the height of the industrial revolution. Made from Sea Island cotton, they were among the very first T-shirts ever made. Sunspel manufactures T-shirts in its Long Eaton factory and uses extra-long staple Supima cotton from California, which can be traced to the farm it comes from.

=== Boxer shorts ===
Sunspel introduced the boxer short to the UK from the US in 1947 after John Hill, the great-grandson of founder Thomas Hill, discovered the style on his honeymoon in the US. He modified the design in the process, adding a back panel, flattening the seams and using the highest quality cotton. In 1985, a Levis advertisement saw English model Nick Kamen wearing a pair of Sunspel boxer shorts. This advertisement is widely attributed as being the moment that brought this underwear style to mass popularity in the UK.

=== Polo shirts ===
In 2006, Sunspel designed a custom polo shirt for Daniel Craig in his debut performance as James Bond in Casino Royale. The shirt was based on a classic 1950s Sunspel polo shirt, which was selected and updated by award-winning stylist Lindy Hemming. The Riviera Polo Shirt is made from extra-long staple Supima cotton that can be traced to the Californian farm of origin.

== Film and media exposure ==
In 1985 Nick Kamen starred in a celebrated Levi's advertisement, in which he removed his jeans in a launderette, to reveal a pair of white Sunspel boxer shorts.

In 2006 Daniel Craig wore a Sunspel Riviera polo shirt and Riviera T-shirt in his first James Bond film, Casino Royale.

Christian Bale wore Sunspel in The Dark Knight Rises.

In 2013, the Rolling Stones wore Sunspel T-shirts on their world tour.

In 2016, the television football pundit Gary Lineker undertook to present the season-opening edition of Match of the Day in his underpants if Leicester City became Premier League Champions. He performed his promise in a pair of Sunspel boxer shorts.

In the 2025 film, F1, Brad Pitt's character Sonny Hayes wears a pink, and green sweatshirt from the brand.

== See also ==
- Drake's
- John Smedley
