= Tower Mill, Dukinfield =

Cotton mill in Greater Manchester, England

Tower Mill
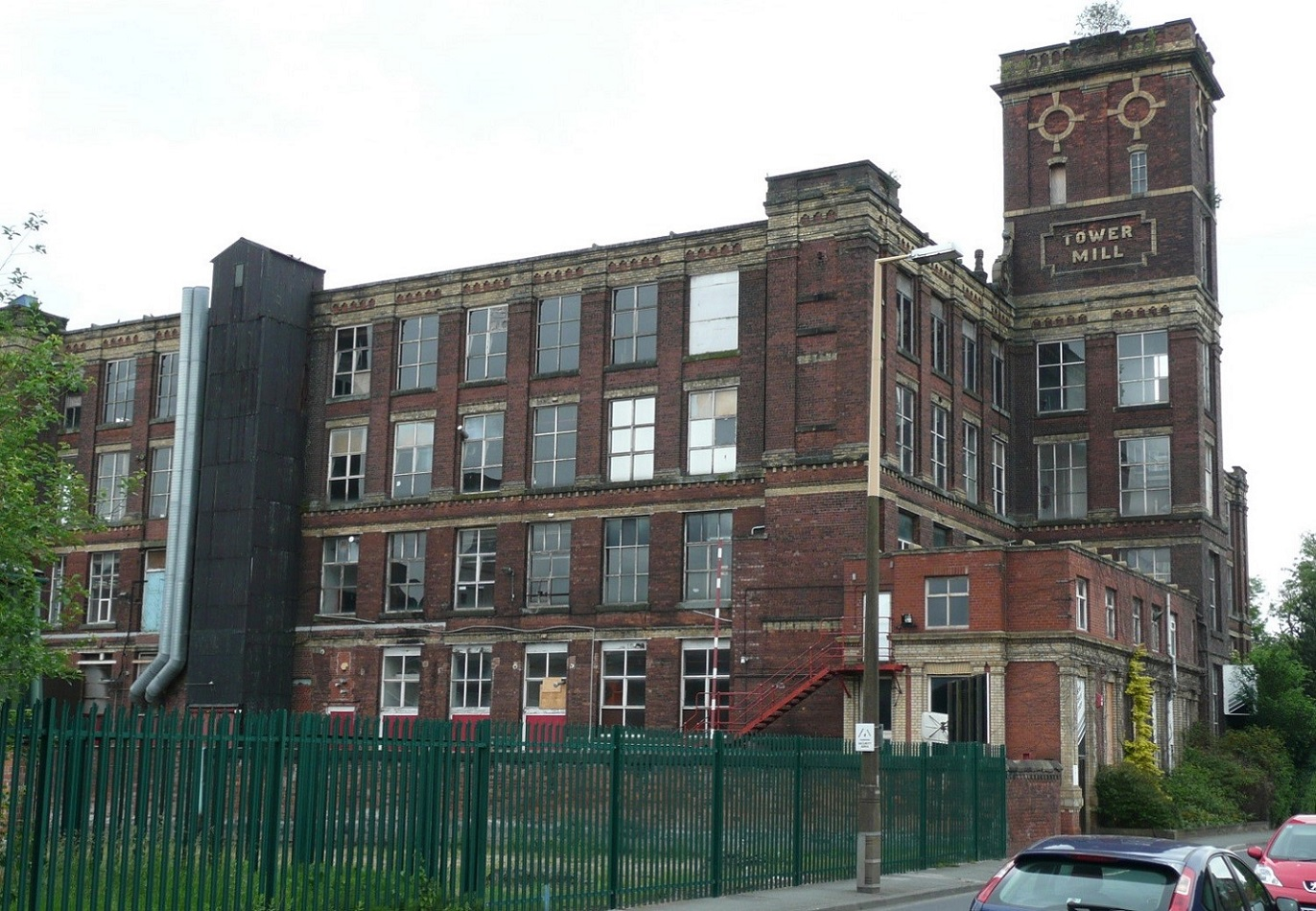
- Tower Mill in 2011

- Location in Greater Manchester
- Location: Dukinfield, Greater Manchester (formerly Cheshire), England
- Serving canal: Huddersfield Narrow Canal
- Owner: Christian Koch
- Current owners: English Fine Cotton Ltd
- Coordinates: 53°28′51″N 2°04′33″W

Construction
- Completed: 1885
- Renovated: 2015
- Floor count: 4

Design team
- Architect: Potts, Pickup & Dixon

Equipment
- Date: 2016 / 2017
- Manufacturer: Truetzschler, Zinser, Savio
- Ring Frames path: 24,000 ring spindles (1955); 7,200 ring spindles (2017)

Tower Mill is a cotton mill in Dukinfield, Greater Manchester, England. It is a grade II listed building. It was designed by Potts, Pickup & Dixon in 1885 and spun cotton, using mules and spinning frames until 1955 when it was no longer used as a cotton mill and was subsequently used by various industries and divided into small units, at one point plans were even passed for the mill to be converted into luxury apartments but with the recession in 2007/8 this plan was abandoned. After several years of lying empty it was eventually bought in 2013, restored and re-equipped to ring spin superfine cotton yarns in 2016 and is now after the absence for many years the only cotton mill in production in the United Kingdom.

== Description ==
This impressive building produces spun cotton. It specialises in superfine long staple cotton such as American Supima. The building is being totally renovated.

=== The building ===
The ground floor houses the six stage blowing room where the fibres are opened, plucked, cleaned and blended: with bale breakers (openers, bale pluckers), carding machines, a drawframe to draft the sliver, a lapformer, a comber to remove the short fibres, a speedframe to draft further and to wind the roving onto roving bobbins. The frames are by Truetzschler.and Zinser

The third floor has the 6 ring frames which at around 50 metres in length per machine boast a total of 7,200 spindles and where the yarn is spun onto tubes to produce what are known as cops, finished cops are taken to the autoconer on the 1st floor which cuts out any imperfections and then rejoins (splices) the yarn with an almost invisible join. Yarn can be plied (2,3 or 4 single yarns twisted together) as required.

=== Cotton varieties ===
Only four varieties of the cotton genus are used commercially- coarse counts use surat, while the fine counts use types of Gossypium barbadense. These are all extra long staple (ELS) cottons- They have a staple length exceeding 35 millimetres (1.4 in) and often over 40 millimetres (1.6 in) while 'upland' cottons are 27 millimetres (1.1 in). The longest staple are 'special' hand picked American Pima, Sea Island, Indian Suvin and Egyptian Giza 45.

English Fine Cotton are purchasing 85% of their Pima from J G Boswell, the world's largest Supima cotton farm in California. The cotton bales can be tracked to the section of the field where it was grown and the date when it was picked. The combine harvesters run on a precision GPS navigation system. The cotton is ginned on the farm before it is baled and exported.

== History ==
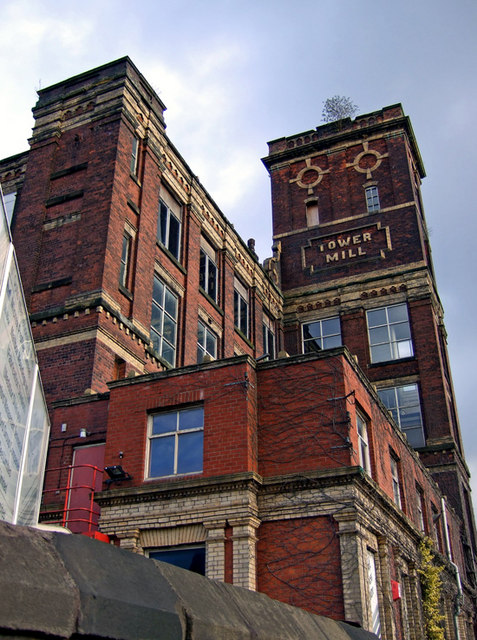
The mill in 2009

Built for Christian Koch, this 4 storey mill is similar to River Mill, but more ornate being a Potts design. It had 44,000 spindles and 5000 twiner spindles, doing coarse counts. The River and Tower Mills Co Ltd (1912) ceased spinning at River Mill in 1934, but by increasing the reliance on ring spinning kept Tower going until 1955. On closure it had 13,000 mule and 24,000 ring spindles.

The River and Tower Mills Co Ltd (1912) ceased spinning at River in 1934, but by increasing the reliance on ring spinning, it kept Tower going until 1955. On closure it had 13,000 mule and 24,000 ring spindles.

== Revival ==
In 2015 the mill was chosen as the new manufacturing site for English Fine Cotton. The company is investing £4.8m with a £1m grant from the Textile Growth Programme to restart cotton production in Greater Manchester for the first time since the 1980s. The mill is using modern technology machinery and produces cotton for high value products.

== Media ==
The BBC One series Making Out was filmed at the mill and broadcast from 1989 to 1991.

== See also ==
- Listed buildings in Dukinfield

== Bibliography ==
- Ashmore, Owen (1982). The industrial archaeology of North-west England. Manchester University Press. ISBN 0-7190-0820-4.
- Haynes, Ian (1993), Dukinfield Cotton Mills, Neil Richardson, ISBN 1-85216-080-2
- "A 21st Century Mill". English Fine Cottons. 17 October 2016.
- "Our Cotton in California". English Fine Cottons.
- Williams, Mike; Farnie (1992). Cotton Mills in Greater Manchester. Carnegie Publishing. ISBN 0-948789-89-1.
