= Thomas Hill (clothing manufacturer) =

British businessman factory owner (1823-1909)

Thomas Arthur Hill
- Born: c. 1823; Nottingham, England
- Died: c. 1909 (aged 85–86)
- Occupation: Businessman
- Known for: Hosiery and underwear factory owner and founder of luxury brand
- Children: 3

Thomas Arthur Hill (c. 1823 – 1909) was an English hosiery and underwear manufacturer and factory owner from Nottingham. His company, Thomas A. Hill Ltd, later changed its name to Sunspel and is now a leading luxury British brand.

== Career ==
Hill became the managing partner of the Nottingham branch of I. & R. Morley in 1860, working under the renowned abolitionist and MP, Samuel Morley, who introduced pensions and elementary education for his workers.

As managing partner, Hill opened and developed several factories, including those on Manvers Street and Handel Street, Daybrook. He significantly improved the factories with better machinery, lighting, and sanitation and was among the first to introduce steam-powered machinery in Nottingham. He also introduced regular working hours and standard wages.

Hill also operated his own company, Thomas A. Hill Ltd, which later became Sunspel. The company manufactured high-quality undergarments from merino wool, cashmere, silk, and cotton, operating from a large factory on Castle Gate, Nottingham. Hill introduced modern machinery and ensured good working conditions, with adequate lighting, ventilation, and fire safety drills. His goods were "subjected to a rigid examination by an experienced overlooker whose duty it [was] to inspect every article before finally passing the goods as finished." The firm used modern hosiery machines to develop fabrics; these included "rib frames, rotary frames, circular and fleecy web frames, circular body and webbing frames with the requisite complement of winding machines." It sold its products to large wholesalers in Britain and exported them abroad.

In 1908, Thomas A. Hill Ltd became one of the first companies to sell T-shirts, which were made from rare, extra-long staple Sea island cotton.

== Legacy ==
Hill died in 1909 and was survived by two sons (Charles and Thomas Arthur) and a daughter. His son, Thomas Arthur, took over the business. In 1934, the company changed its name to Sunspel. In 2005, Hill's great-grandson, Peter Hill, sold the firm to Nicholas Brooke.
