= Dukinfield Junction =

Canal junction in Greater Manchester, England

Coordinates: 53.4826°N 2.0997°W

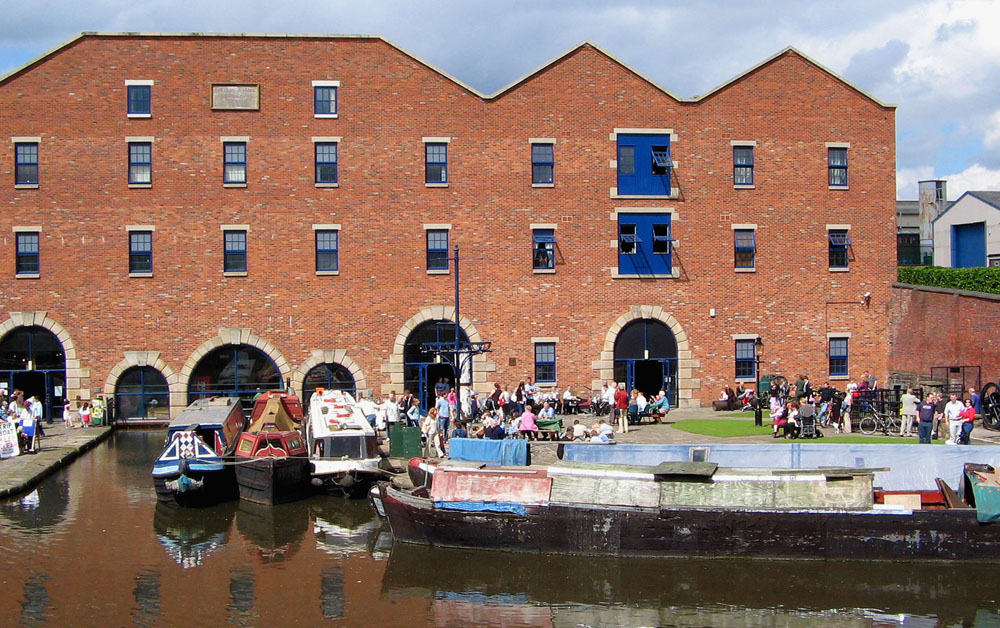
- The Portland Basin warehouse

Specifications
- Status: Open
- Navigation authority: Canal & River Trust

History
- Date completed: 1800
- Date closed: 1962
- Date restored: 1974

Dukinfield Junction (grid reference SJ933984) is the name of the canal junction where the Peak Forest Canal, the Ashton Canal and the Huddersfield Narrow Canal meet near Ashton-under-Lyne, Greater Manchester, England. The area has been designated by Tameside Metropolitan Borough Council as a conservation area.

It is adjacent to Portland Basin, and the names are often used as synonyms by boaters, whilst locals refer only to Portland Basin. Strictly speaking, Portland Basin is the wide area on the main line of the canal. The arm under the junction bridge and the aqueduct over the River Tame were built by the Ashton Canal, and the junction with the Peak Forest canal was historically at the southern end of the aqueduct.

== History ==
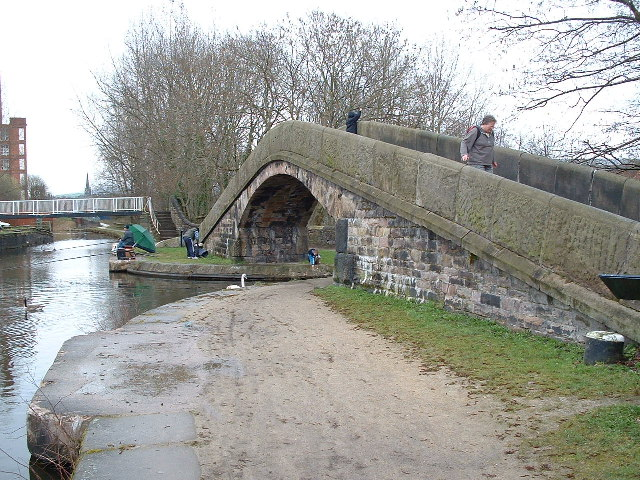
The towpath bridge crosses the Peak Forest Canal. The Huddersfield Narrow Canal is ahead, and the Ashton Canal is behind the photographer.

The Ashton Canal was authorised by an Act of Parliament obtained in 1792, to connect the coal mining area around Oldham and the textile mills of Ashton-under-Lyne to Manchester. It was heavily-locked, with 18 locks in 6.5 miles (10.5 km). During construction, the company obtained a second Act to allow them to build the Hollinwood Branch Canal, the Stockport Canal and the Beat Bank Branch Canal. The line to Ashton and the branch to Hollinwood were both opened in December 1796, and the Stockport Branch opened in January 1797, but the Beat Bank Branch was never completed.

The Peak Forest Canal was authorised two years after the Ashton Canal, to access limestone reserves at Doveholes, near Whaley Bridge. The final 6.5 miles (10.5 km) were built as a tramway, as the quarries were too high to make access by canal economic, and the limestone was transhipped to barges at Bugsworth Basin. The canal is on two levels separated by a flight of locks at Marple which had not been completed when most of the canal opened in 1800. A temporary tramway bypassed the locks until they were completed four years later. The Ashton Canal built a short section of canal southwards from the junction, which included an aqueduct over the River Tame, and the Peak Forest Canal officially started at the southern end of the aqueduct.

The Huddersfield Narrow Canal was also authorised in 1794, and is one of three which cross the Pennines. It was a huge undertaking, with 74 locks and the longest canal tunnel in Britain at Standedge. Sections were opened at both ends as they were completed, with that from Ashton to Greenfield opening in 1798. The canal was not fully opened until 1811, with the completion of the tunnel. It joins the Ashton Canal end-on at the junction.

== Restoration ==
The Huddersfield Narrow Canal was abandoned in 1944. The Peak Forest Canal had ceased to be used by the start of the Second World War in 1939, and the Ashton Canal was unnavigable by 1962. However, the Peak Forest Canal Society was formed, and working with the British Waterways Board, the local councils through which the canals ran, and the Inland Waterways Association, the Ashton Canal and the lower Peak Forest Canal were reopened in 1974, bringing the junction back into use. A campaign for the restoration of the Huddersfield Narrow Canal began in the same year, but was not completed until 2001, helped by public funding from the Millennium Commission.

== Ashton Canal Warehouse ==
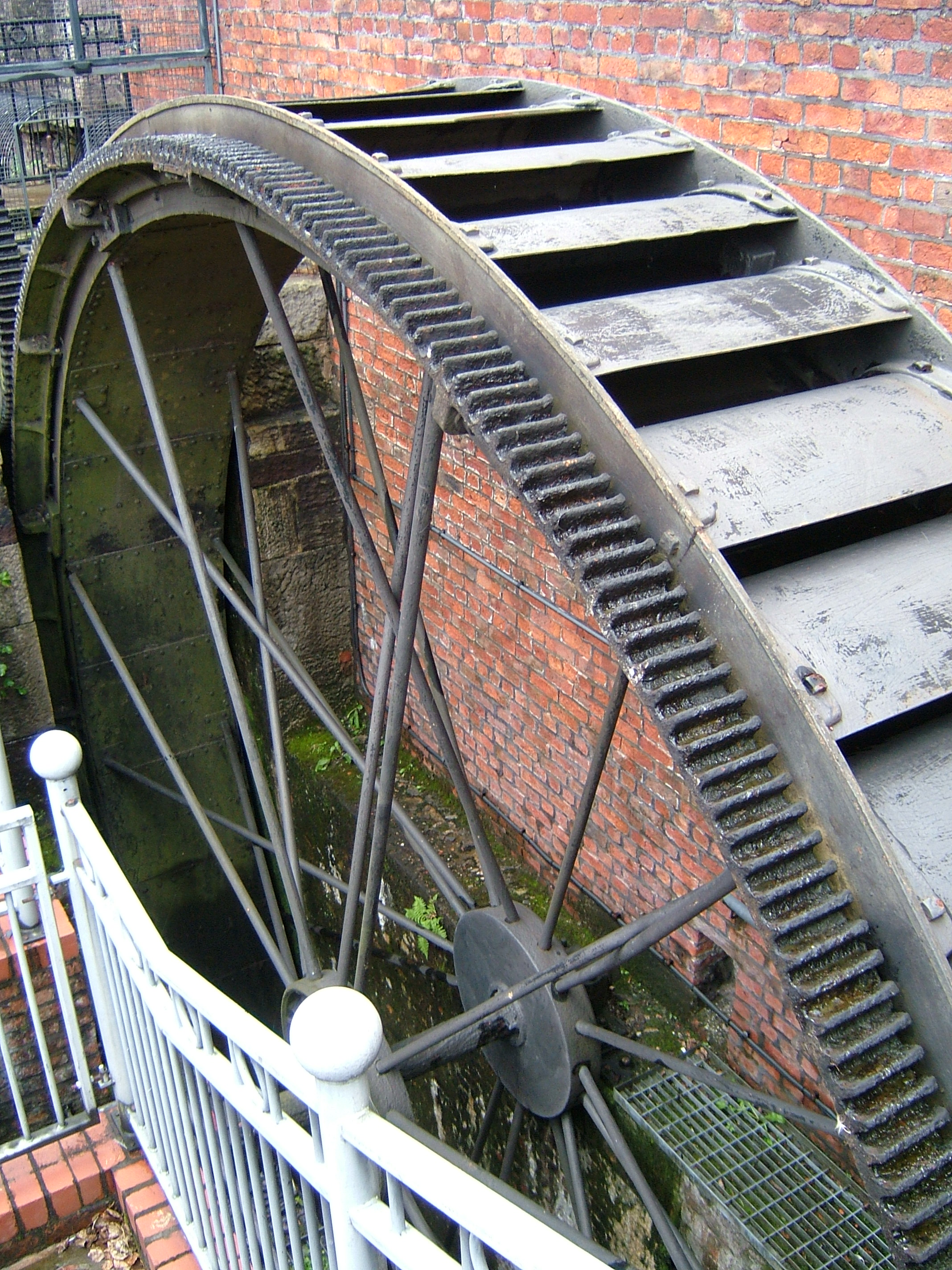
The restored waterwheel

The Ashton Canal Warehouse was built at the Portland Basin in 1834 by the canal company replacing the early warehouse to the east. It is a three-storey warehouse 200 feet (61 m) by 72 feet (22 m), brick built in English garden wall bond. The wooden floors are supported by cast iron columns. The southern elevation which opened to the canal was 3 storeys high and it had three shipping holes. The northern elevation which opens to the road is two storeys high, trap doors allowed split loading and unloading between the road and the 3 canal arms. The roof was flat allowing increased storage. The building we see today is the result of a 1998 restoration.

=== Portland Basin water wheel ===
The internal hoist system was powered by an external waterwheel. The head race was taken from the canal, and the tailrace fed down to the River Tame 33 feet (10 m) below. The high breastshot waterwheel was constructed in 1841 to a suspension design introduced by Thomas Hewes and William Armstrong Fairburn and had rim gearing. It cost £1078. It was 24 feet (7.3 m) in diameter and 3 feet (0.9 m) in width and produced 15 hp (11 kW). Power was transmitted by a line shaft. Using a suspension system, akin to the spokes on a bicycle, allowed the wheel to be lighter than the wooden one it replaced. Taking the power train off the rim rather than from axle reduces the stress and gears up the line-shaft leading to less power loss.

== Portland Basin Museum ==
Portland Basin is the location of the Portland Basin Museum, housed within the restored nineteenth century Ashton Canal Warehouse, covering the area's industrial heritage. The warehouse was built in 1834, and interprets aspects of local history, industry and trades. Exhibits include a 1920s period street with shops, period room displays and historic machines.

== Wooden Canal Boat Society ==
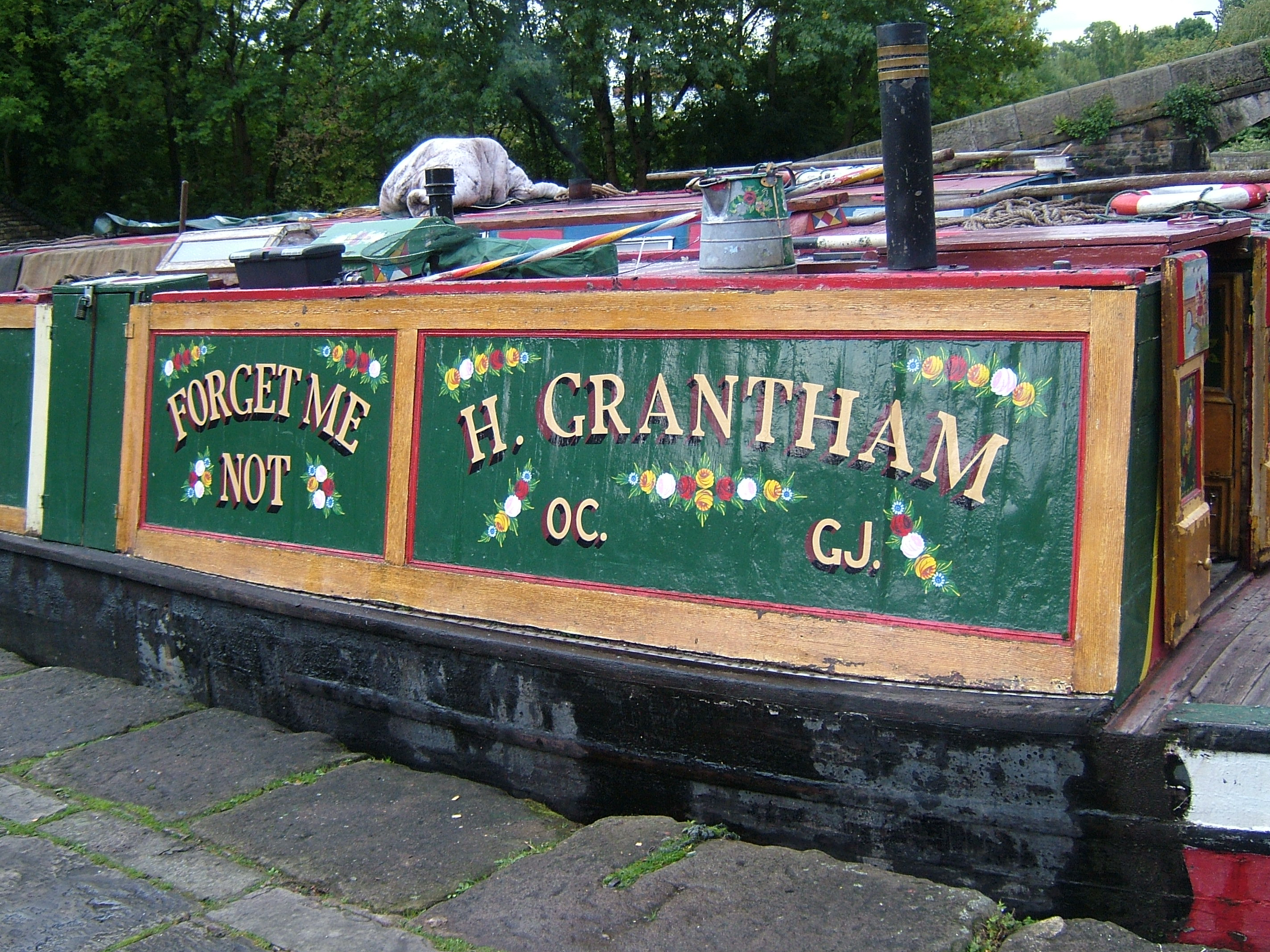
Forget me not (1927), at the basin in September 2010

The Portland Basin hosts the Wooden Canal Boat Society which has restored and works six traditional narrowboats. The Society was formed as a charitable company limited by guarantee in 1996, and took over the assets of the former Wooden Canal Boat Trust in 1997. It became a registered charity in 1998, and the first boat was moved to Portland Basin Museum in 1996.

== Location ==
The junction is located on the southern edge of Ashton-under-Lyne, and the Ashton Canal approaches it from the south-east. The canal is level for 2.5 miles (4.0 km) to Fairfield Junction, where the Hollinwood Branch turned north, and the Fairfield locks begin the descent to Manchester. The Peak Forest Canal heads south, and is level for 7 miles (11 km) to the first of the sixteen Marple Locks. It passes through two short tunnels at Woodley and Hyde Bank, the second of which is slightly too narrow to allow two boats to pass. The Huddersfield Narrow Canal heads to the north-east, and passes through a tunnel under an Asda supermarket to reach the first of 32 locks that ascend to Standedge Tunnel, 0.4 miles (0.64 km) from the junction.

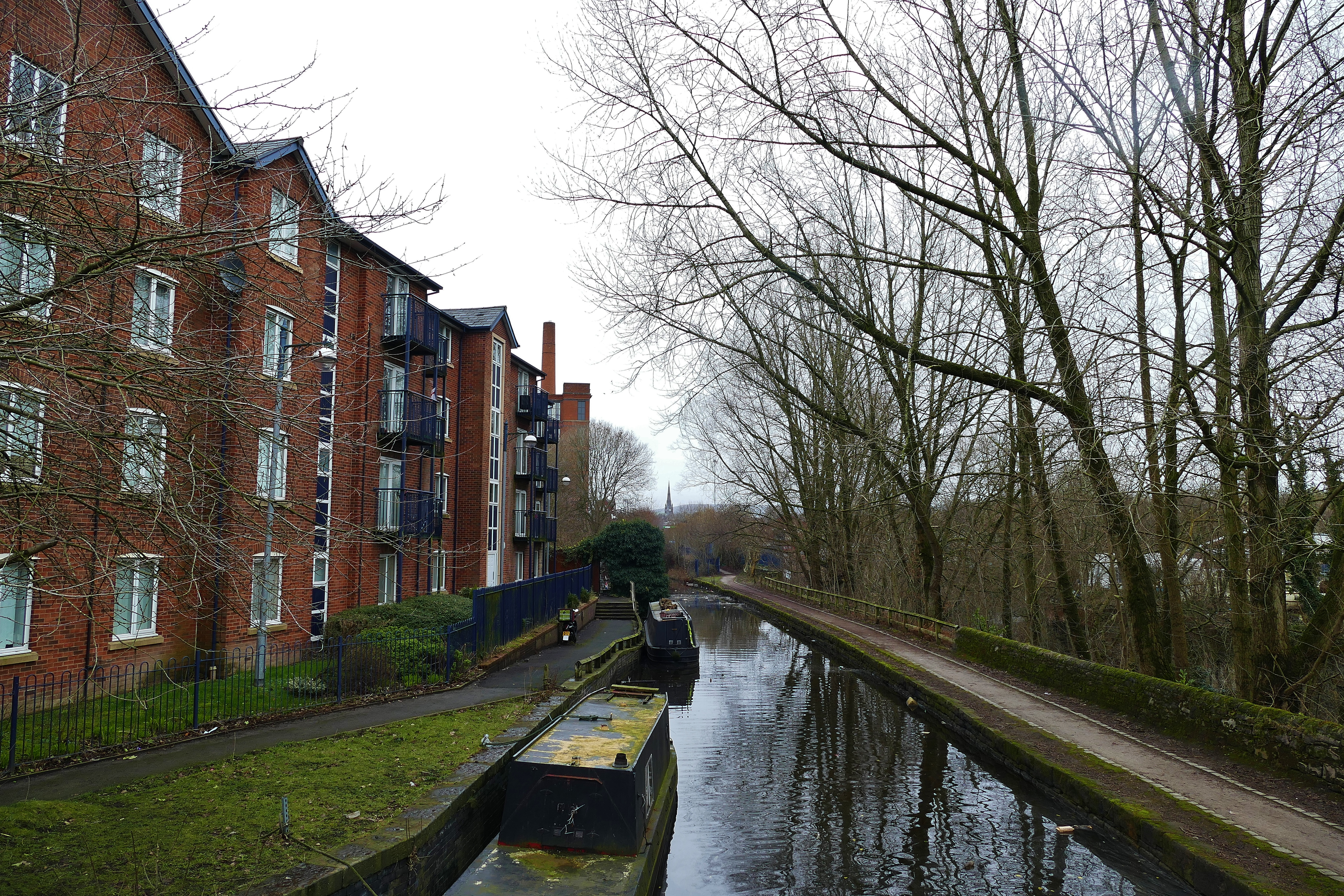

A slender bridge carries the towpath over the line to the aqueduct and the Peak Forest Canal. It carries the date 1835, and is a grade II listed structure. Nearby is Cavendish Mill, a former cotton spinning mill built in 1884-5, and one of the first to use steel girders and lintel plates to support concrete floors, rather than using brick arches. The construction method was pioneered by Edward Potts, who failed to obtain a patent for the design in 1884. The junction is the location for the Tameside Canals Festival, held in mid-July each year.

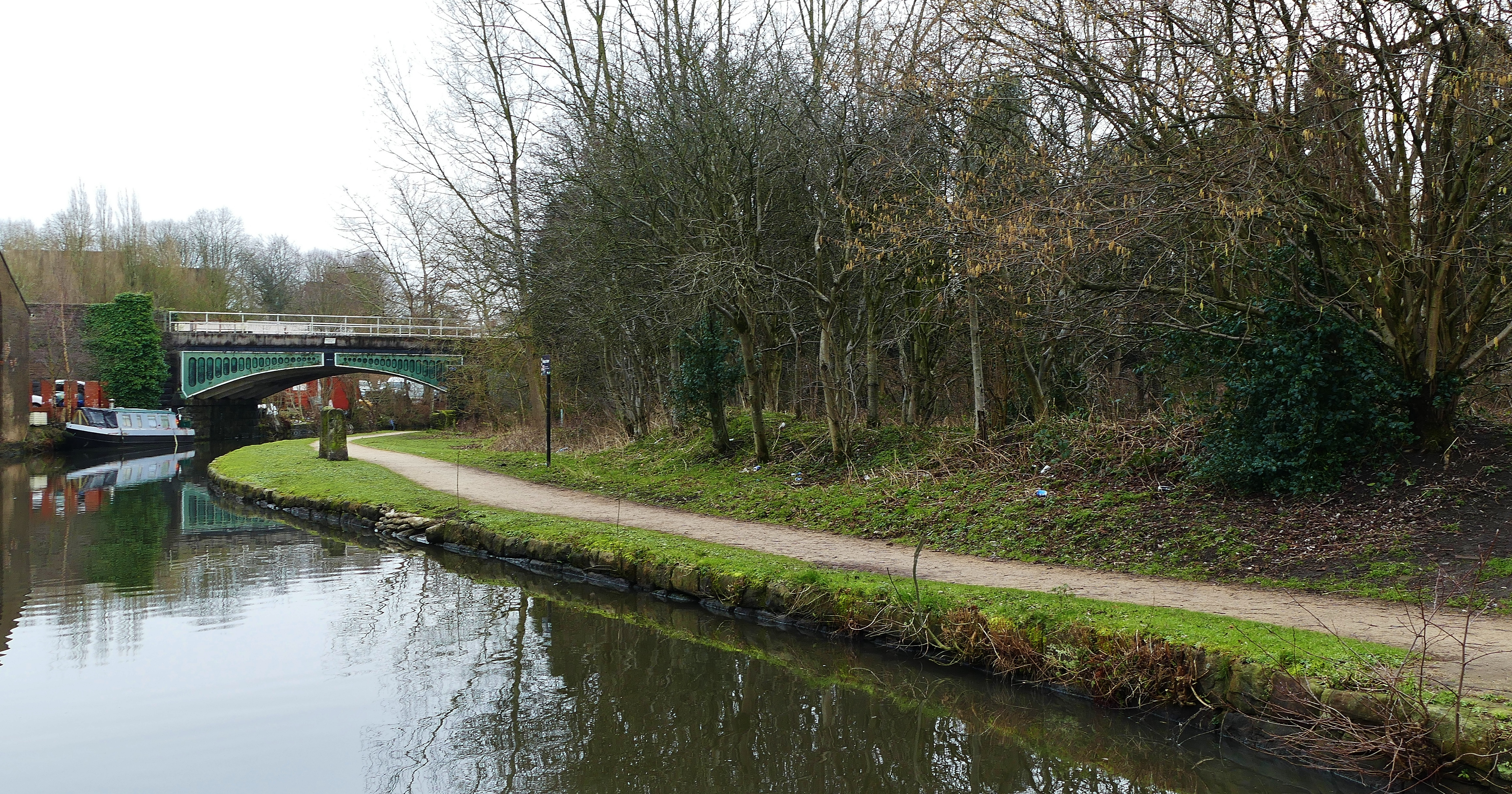

== See also ==
- Junction Mills, Ashton-under-Lyne
- List of canal junctions in Great Britain

== Bibliography ==
- Cumberlidge, Jane (2009). Inland Waterways of Great Britain (8th Ed.). Imray Laurie Norie and Wilson. ISBN 978-1-84623-010-3.
- Hadfield, Charles; Biddle, Gordon (1970). The Canals of North West England, Vol 2 (pp.241-496). David and Charles. ISBN 0-7153-4992-9.
- McNeil, R.; Nevell (2000). A Guide to the Industrial Archaeology of Greater Manchester. Association for Industrial Archaeology. ISBN 0-9528930-3-7.
- Nevell, Mike; Walker (2001). Portland Basin and the archaeology of the Canal Warehouse. Tameside Metropolitan Borough with University of Manchester Archaeological Unit. ISBN 1-871324-25-4.
- Nicholson (2006). Nicholson Guides Vol 5: North West and the Pennines. Harper Collins. ISBN 978-0-00-721113-5.
