= Textile Growth Programme =

Funded program in UK to support and create jobs in the textile industry

The Textile Growth Programme is a programme in the United Kingdom funded by the European Union Regional Development Fund, designed to support and create jobs in the textile industry through grant aid.

== Recipients ==
- 2016 English Fine Cotton Tower Mill, Dukinfield
