= Cavendish Mill =

Listed building in Greater Manchester, England

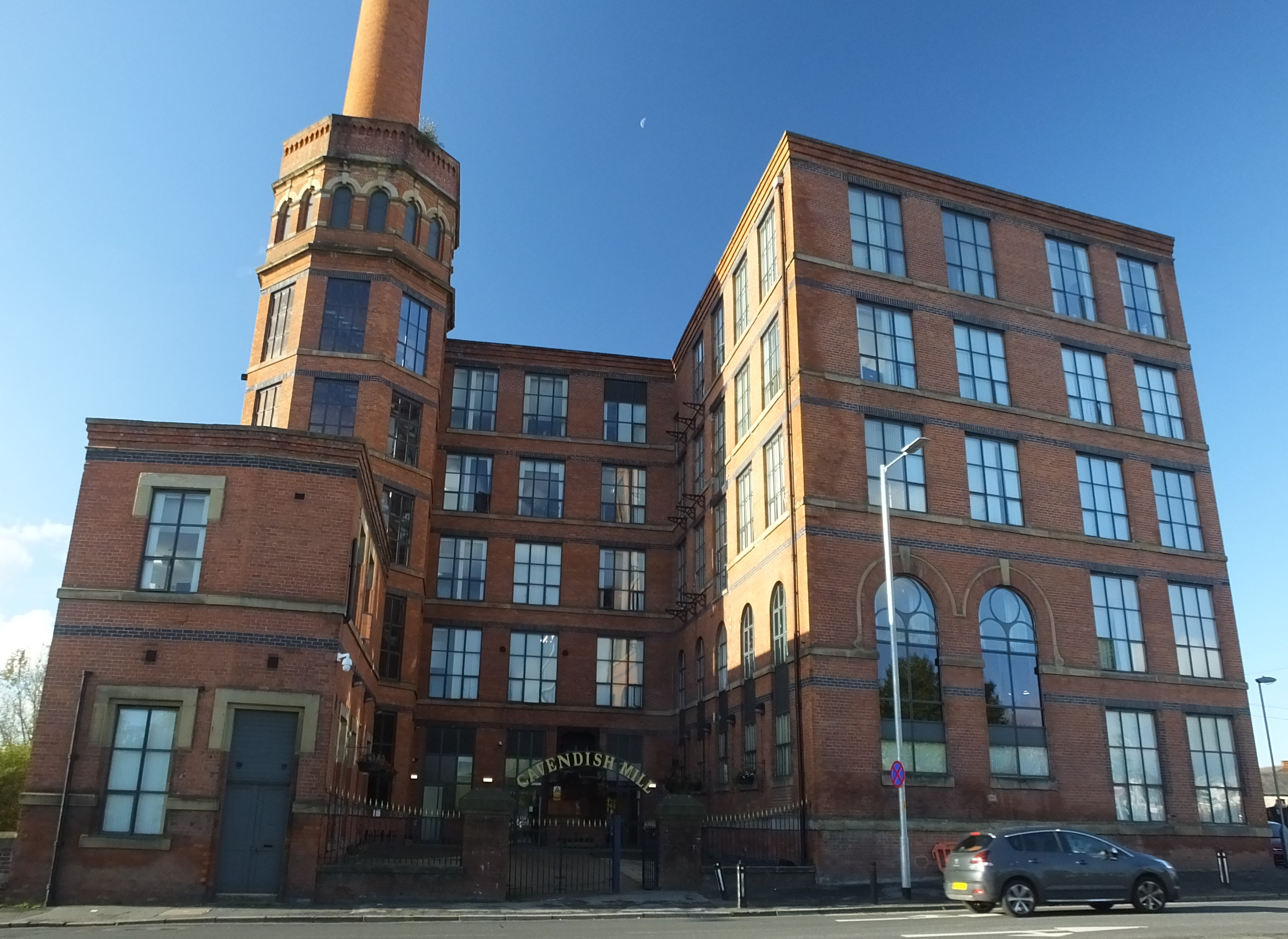
- The mill in 2016

- Location in Greater Manchester

Spinning (ring mill)
- Location: Ashton-under-Lyne, England
- Serving canal: Ashton Canal
- Serving railway: Lancashire and Yorkshire Railway
- Owner: Cavendish Spinning Company
- Coordinates: 53.4840°N 2.0973°W

Construction
- Built: 1885; 141 years ago
- Main contractor: Stoor Sons & Co Ltd

Design team
- Architect: Potts, Pickup & Dixon of Oldham

Power
- Date: 1885; 141 years ago
- Engine maker: Hick, Hargreaves & Co.
- Transmission type: Geared transmission

Equipment
- Manufacturer: Asa Lees
- Mule Frames: 72,360 mule spindles: 1885; 56,172 mule 22,383 ring: 1920

Cavendish Mill is a Grade II* listed former cotton spinning mill in Ashton-under-Lyne, Greater Manchester, England. It was built between 1884 and 1885 for the Cavendish Spinning Company by Potts, Pickup & Dixon of Oldham. Cavendish Mill was next to the Ashton Canal Warehouse at Portland Basin. It ceased spinning cotton in 1934 and was then used for a variety of purposes before it was converted into housing in 1994.

== Location ==
Cavendish Mill was built on the site of the former Bankfield Mill, separated from Portland Basin on the final section of the Ashton Canal by the site of Tudor Mill.

== History ==
The Cavendish Spinning Company Limited was registered in 1884 to build the Cavendish Mill on the site of the former Bankfield Mill. This was a Potts building. It was six storeys tall on the canal side, and five on the other. It is a fireproof design and was the first mill in Ashton to have concrete floors and a flat roof. It is recognisable by the octagonal staircase that surrounds the lower part of the chimney. It stopped spinning in 1934 and was put to other uses. It still stands.

=== Power ===
The steam engine was a horizontal twin compound by Hick, Hargreaves & Co of Bolton.

=== Equipment ===
The machinery was provided by Asa Lees; originally there were 72,360 for coarse and medium counts. Between 1911 and 1920 many of the mules were replaced by ring frames so it contained 57,172 mule spindles and 22,588 ring spindles

== Usage ==
Until 1934, the Cavendish Spinning Company used the mill for spinning coarse and mediums of American cotton, after which it was used for the process of winding artificial silk from synthetic fibres on to weavers' beams by the Bentinck Street Silk Works company until 1976, and then by Twinglass Limited, a double glazing company, to manufacture window frames. It is still standing, having been converted into a resource centre for the community, commercial units and 165 apartments by the Worcester-based Sanctuary Housing Association in 1994. In June 2008, ownership passed to New Charter Housing Trust, a company specialising in managing social housing in Tameside. Among the commercial tenants is Tameside Community Radio Limited.

=== Owners ===
- Cavendish Spinning Company Ltd
- Bentinck Street Silk Works Ltd, rayon processors
- Twinglass Limited, a manufacturer of double glazed window frames
- Sanctuary Housing Association
- New Charter Housing Trust

== See also ==
- Grade II* listed buildings in Greater Manchester
- Listed buildings in Ashton-under-Lyne
- Textile manufacturing

== Bibliography ==
- Haynes, Ian (1987). Cotton in Ashton. Libraries and Arts Committee, Tameside Metropolitan Borough. ISBN 0-904506-14-2.
- Williams, Mike; Farnie, Douglas Anthony (1992). Cotton Mills of Greater Manchester. Carnegie Publishing. ISBN 0-948789-69-7.
