= Junction Mills, Ashton-under-Lyne =

Cotton Mill in Greater Manchester, England

Junction Mills
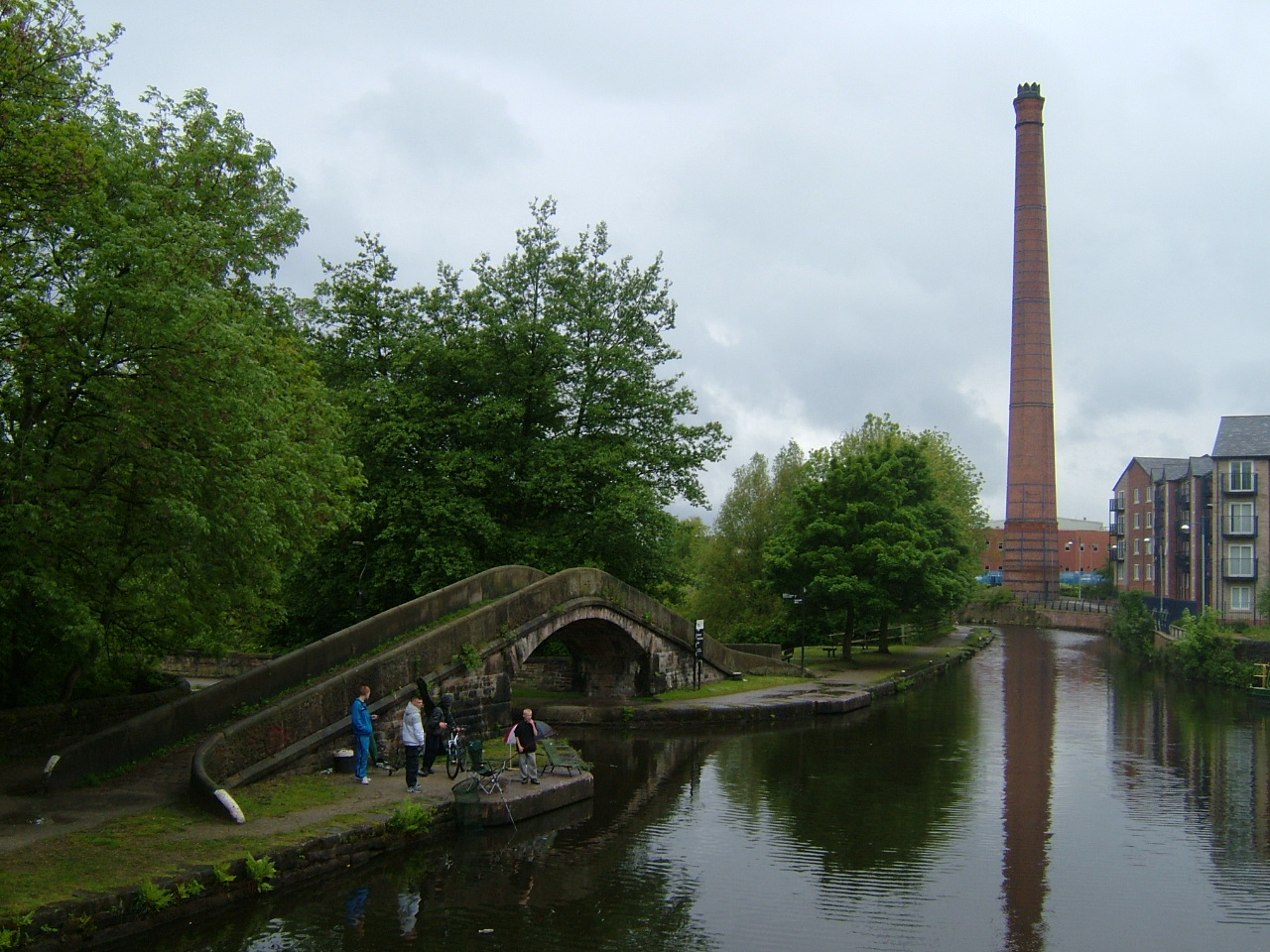
- Junction Mill Chimney

- Location in Greater Manchester

Spinning (Mule mill)
- Current status: Closed, 1930
- Location: West of Portland Basin, Ashton-under-Lyne, Greater Manchester, England
- Serving canal: Ashton Canal
- Serving railway: Lancashire and Yorkshire Railway
- Owner: Samuel Heginbottom
- Further ownership: Samuel Heginbottom and Sons Ltd (1896/7)
- Coordinates: 53.4818°N 2.1013°W

Construction
- Built: 1831
- Renovated: 1867 Chimney built

The Junction Mills were cotton spinning and weaving mills to the west of the Portland Basin in Ashton-under-Lyne, Greater Manchester, in England. They were built between 1831 and 1890 for the Samuel Heginbottom and his sons. The firm went out of business in 1930, and all the buildings have been demolished but the 210 feet (64 m) octagonal chimney, built in 1867, and typical of that period has been preserved in situ.

== Location ==
The Junction mills were built alongside the Ashton Canal to the west of the Portland Basin.

== History ==
Generally, the earlier mills in Ashton had been built close to the town centre, but after 1824 all the new mills had been built adjacent to the canal. Sites with a good wharf were favoured.1825 to 1830 was a period of depression. In the boom of 1830 many mills built extensions. Samuel Heginbottom bought the land to the west of the Portland basin in 1831, and by 1833 had constructed a five-storey mill that cost £5000.

The first expansion was in 1835, when a 22 bay five storey mill was built on newly acquired land fronting Margaret St. In November 1837, a banquet was held here before the machinery was installed, and the mill became known as 'Banquet Mill'. In 1839 the two mills were connected by a further multistorey block. All these mills were built for spinning, but by 1837 power looms had been installed and by 1847, the mills were producing printed cloths and shirtings.

The 1840 mill was employing 632 hands, rising in 1860 to 700. The 210 feet (64 m) high octagonal chimney was built in 1867, adjoining the Banquet Mill Engine House, presumably in an attempt to increase the efficiency of the boilers that were required to produce even more power. More weaving sheds were constructed in 1884, giving space for 1004 looms. The Spindleage at this time was 48,000. A further 400 looms were installed in 1893 in a detached shed on the other side of Margaret Street.

The company was incorporated in 1896/7, when it was spinning medium counts and weaving fancies such as Jacquards, sateens, drillettes and velvets. The company closed in 1930, and though part of the 1831 mill remained until 1987 it has all been demolished except the chimney which has been preserved as local landmark.

=== Owners ===
- Samuel Heginbottom
- Samuel Heginbottom and Sons Ltd

== See also ==
- Textile manufacturing

== Bibliography ==
- Ashton. "Cotton Mills of Ashton — Archive Photographs". Archived from the original on 15 December 2008.
- Haynes, Ian (1987). Cotton in Ashton. Libraries and Arts Committee, Tameside Metropolitan Borough. ISBN 0-904506-14-2.
