= Ray Mill, Stalybridge =

Cotton mill in Stalybridge, England

Coordinates: 53°28′54″N 2°04′27″W

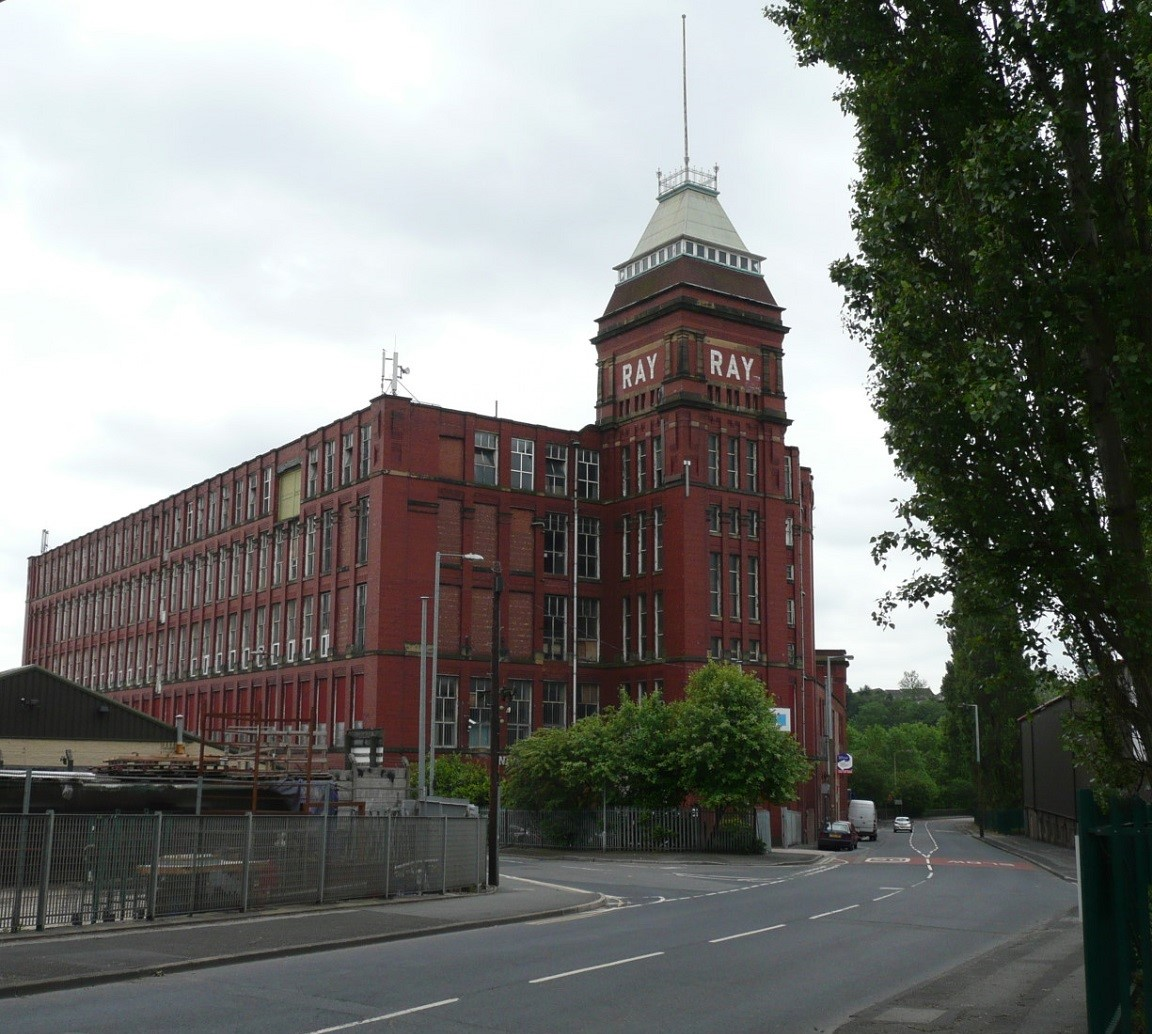

Ray Mill was a mill in Stalybridge, UK. A five-storey, electrically driven red brick spinning mill built in 1907. It contained 66,528 ring spindles and 9000 doubling spindles. Together with Premier Mill it was using 3,050 horsepower (2,270 kW) of electricity. The syndicate of owners also owned Victor Mill and Premier Mill. In 1911 the three companies merged to form Victor Mill Ltd which employed 1500 people. Ray was spinning medium counts from American cotton. By 1950 the company was part of the Fine Spinners and Doublers Association, and was taken over by Courtaulds in 1960 and was still in production until 1982. On 17 March 2018, a huge devastating fire broke out in the mill which took over 50 firefighters from across Greater Manchester to deal with.

The building housed 15 businesses at the time of the fire. The building was largely destroyed by the fire and subsequently demolished.
