= Supima =

Marketing organisation for American long staple cotton

Supima (Superior pima) is a non-profit trade association in the United States promoting American-grown Pima cotton (Gossypium barbadense). Founded in 1954, it derived its name from superior pima. Supima licenses about 600 selected high-quality mills, textile and clothing manufacturers, and brands/retailers to use the SUPIMA® trademark. Members finance the activities of Supima by payments calculated on a "per bale" basis.

Its other activities include:

- research programs to improve the quality of American Pima cotton
- timely crop and market information to its grower-members and licensees
- advertisements in both consumer and trade publications
- presentations to customers both in the USA and abroad
- participation in major international exhibitions and events
- an annual design competition featuring top graduates from the leading U.S. fashion and design schools that is showcased during New York Fashion Week in September

The Board of Directors of Supima is made up of American Pima growers from Arizona, California, New Mexico, and Texas.

Production of Supima cotton has risen from about 100,000 bales per year in the 1980s to over 800,000 bales in 2006. More than 90% of Supima cotton is exported from the United States, the majority of this being for the overseas manufacture of yarn, finished fabrics, clothing, sheets and towels which are re-exported to the United States for sale. The top five importers of Supima cotton are China, India, Pakistan, Turkey, and Peru.

Supima production has fallen in recent years. Supima cotton production in 2026 is forecast at 378,000 bales, down 1 percent from the previous forecast and down 20 percent from 2024.
