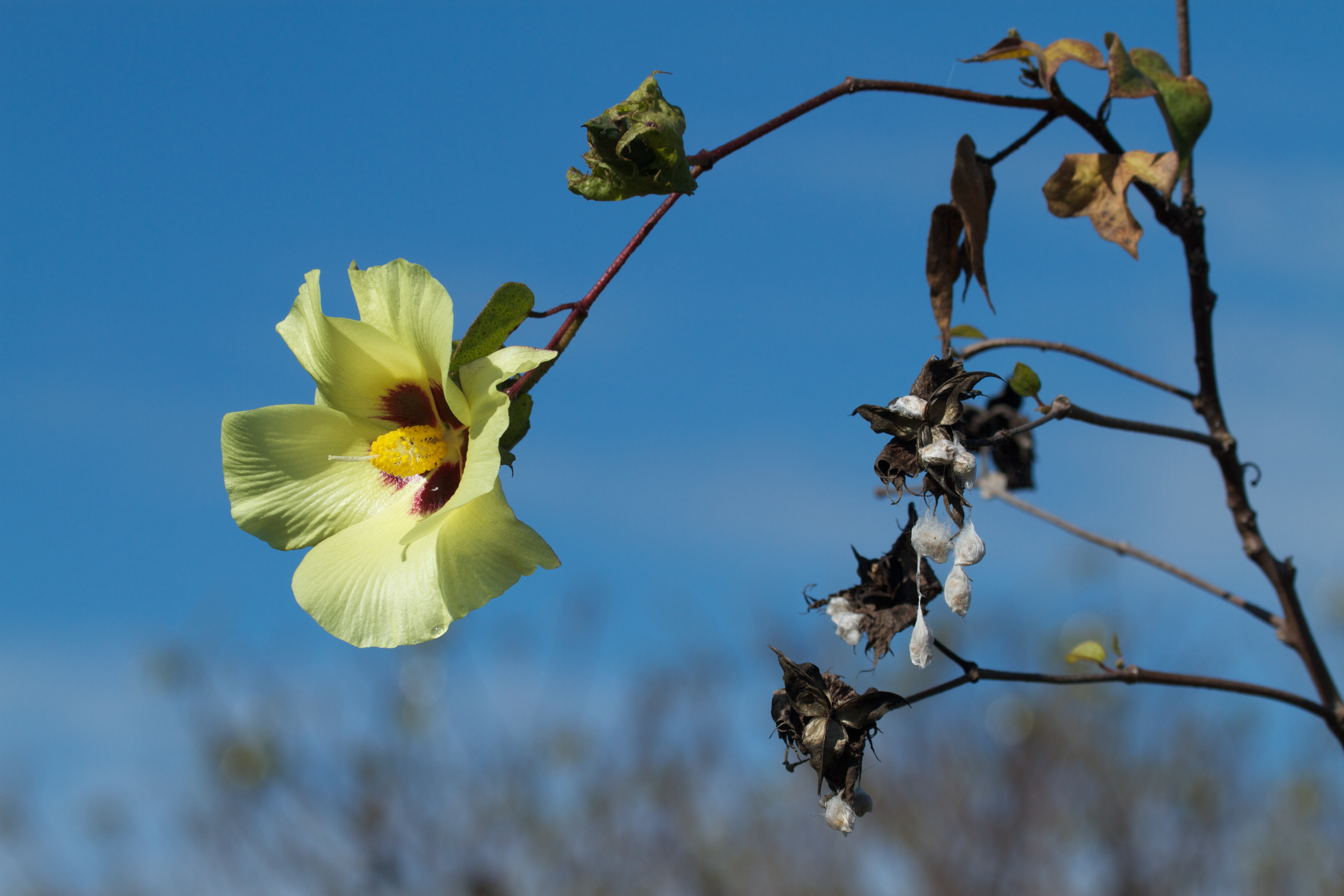

Scientific classification
- Kingdom: Plantae
- Clade: Tracheophytes
- Clade: Angiosperms
- Clade: Eudicots
- Clade: Rosids
- Order: Malvales
- Family: Malvaceae
- Genus: Gossypium
- Subgenus: G. subg. Karpas
- Species: G. barbadense

Binomial name
- Gossypium barbadense L.

= Gossypium barbadense =

Species of cotton

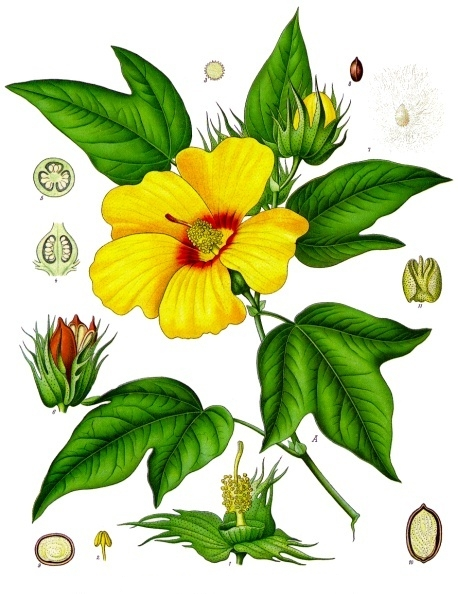
Botanical illustration by Franz Eugen Köhler, 1897

Gossypium barbadense is one of several species of cotton. It is in the mallow family. It has been cultivated since antiquity, but has been especially prized since a form with particularly long fibers was developed in the 19th century. Other names associated with this species include Sea Island, Egyptian, Pima, and extra-long staple (ELS) cotton.

The species is a tropical, frost-sensitive perennial that produces yellow flowers and has black seeds. It grows as a bush or small tree and yields cotton with unusually long, silky fibers.

The native range of this species is Colombia to Peru. It is now cultivated in dry tropical and arid subtropical areas around the world. It is the major source of the longer grades of cotton, but accounts for only a small proportion of the overall cotton market.

== Taxonomy and etymology ==
Linnaeus is given credit for describing Gossypium barbadense ("the cotton encountered in Barbados"). Today, this name is universally accepted; however, there is some question whether the modern definition matches what Linnaeus described. Paul A. Fryxell argues, although the evidence surviving from Linnaeus's time is less than ideal, the name is applied correctly. On the other hand, Y. I. Prokhanov and G. K. Brizicky argue that Linnaeus never actually saw any examples of the species we now call G. barbadense.

The species is a member of the mallow family, Malvaceae. (Note: There have always been problems delineating the scope of Malvaceae. With respect to G. barbadense and the other cottons, this has sometimes led to them being placed in the family Bombacaceae rather than Malvaceae.) Authors differ on the ranks between family and genus. A recent example that considers cladistics is Bayer et al. (1999). In this system, G. barbadense and other cottons fall in the subfamily Malvoideae and tribe Gossypiae. The tribe Gossypiae includes cotton species and others that produce the substance gossypol.

The genus Gossypium encompasses the cottons. The genus can be divided by chromosome count. Subgenus Karpas has 52 chromosomes (four sets of 13). This subgenus encompasses G. barbadense, along with G. hirsutum and a few other New World cottons. In comparison, the commercially important Old World cottons have 26 chromosomes. Most botanists who study Gossypium believe that the group of cottons with 52 chromosomes forms a clade. In other words, G. barbadense, G. hirsutum, and a few other New World cotton species arose from the same ancestor.

One form of G. barbadense has been recognized as a variety. Var brasiliense is called "kidney seed cotton" because its seeds are fused together into somewhat kidney-shaped masses.

== Description ==
G. barbadense, like other cottons, forms a small bush in its first year. In cultivation, it is treated as an annual. If allowed to, it can grow into a large bush or even a small tree of height 1–3 m. Leaves are mostly 8–20 cm long, with 3-7 lobes. One distinction between G. barbadense and the more commonly cultivated G. hirsutum is that G. barbadense has three to five lobes whereas G. hirsutum has only three. The lobes of G. barbadense's are also more deeply cut, about two-thirds the length of the leaf, as opposed to one half for G. hirsutum.

Cotton flowers are showy, with five petals that open only partially. The petals are up to 8 cm long, usually yellow. The petals of Sea Island cultivars typically are creamy yellow with a red spot at the base, and as they wither, they turn rose pink. Like other members of the mallow family, the flowers have many stamens, which are merged to form a cylinder around the style.

The seeds and fiber form in a capsule called a "bole". Each bole is divided into three parts, each of which produce 5-8 seeds. (Note: Some historical records identify G. barbadense as "black-seeded" as opposed to "green-seeded" G. hirsutum. Nevertheless, some kinds of G. hirsutum have black seeds.) The seeds are 8-10 mm long. (Note: However, in variety brasiliense "kidney seed cotton" each group of seeds is fused together in a somewhat kidney-shaped mass.)

Thousands of years of cultivation have dramatically changed the fiber in cotton plants. Wild cottons have very little fiber, so little it might not be noticed. The fiber emanates from each seed. The purpose of the fiber to wild plants is unknown. Domesticated cottons have much more fiber. Besides the more obvious long fibers, domesticated cotton seeds have short fibers called "linters". Some cultivars of G. barbadense have so few of these short hairs they are often called "lintless". They can also be called "smooth-seeded" as opposed to "fuzzy-seeded" G. hirsutum.

As with all cottons, the bolls open when they mature, revealing showy "snowballs" of fiber.

All cottons contain gossypol, although some cultivars of G. hirsutum have been selected to minimize this chemical. Those cultivars are more susceptible to insect pests, which suggests the natural purpose of gossypol is to deter pests. The impact of gossypol in agriculture is it makes cotton plants poisonous to non-ruminant animals.

== Distribution and habitat ==
G. barbadense grows in dry portions of the tropics, where it is a perennial. Treated as an annual, and with the benefit of irrigation, it can be cultivated quite successfully in arid subtropical regions.

Human activity has substantially expanded the range of the species. Today, wild populations exhibit the most genetic diversity in Ecuador and Peru, and based on this, Percy and Wendel argue that region is where the species originated (see Vavilov center). S.G. Stephens and M.E. Mosely narrowed this to a small area near the Guayas Estuary in Ecuador and an island off of Manta, Ecuador, as that is where the forms with the most wild characteristics are found. From there, it dispersed. Its natural range is dry habitats from the western South American coast to the intermontaine valleys of the northern Andes to riverine northern South America. By the time Columbus encountered it being cultivated in the Caribbean, its range included much of tropical South and Central America. G. barbadense is now cultivated around the world, including China, Egypt, Sudan, India, Australia, Peru, Israel, the southwestern United States, Tajikistan, Turkmenistan, and Uzbekistan.

== History ==
The earliest known evidence of human use of G. barbadense has been along the coast of present-day Ecuador and Peru. It is plausible humans in that area were also the first to domesticate the species. However, available evidence, such as seeds found in the floors of ancient houses, could be the result of either cultivated or wild-gathered cotton. So far, archaeologists have found evidence of widespread use in this region about 5000 years ago. Further, they have strong evidence at a few sites dating back 5500 years, and weaker evidence as far back as 7800 years. Investigators at one of the circa 5500 year-old sites, in the Ñachoc valley in northern Peru, argue that domestication did not happen there, therefore G. barbasense was domesticated elsewhere and then brought to Ñachoc.

By 1000 BCE, Peruvian cotton bolls were indistinguishable from modern cultivars of G. barbadense. Native Americans grew cotton widely throughout South America and in the West Indies, where Christopher Columbus encountered it. At the time of Columbus, indigenous peoples of the West Indies raised G. barbadense as a dooryard crop, single plants near residences.

The advent of worldwide trade resulted in many kinds of plants being introduced to new places (see Columbian exchange). In the case of cotton, this exchange happened in all directions, new world cottons to the old world, old world cottons to the new world, and cottons to places which they had never grown before. In some cases, this resulted in multiple kinds of cotton growing in the same region. Since then, most of these regions have transitioned to specialize in a particular kind of cotton, resulting in the distinctive market classes of today.

During the 17th century, European colonists in the English West Indies developed cotton as a cash crop for export to Europe, establishing numerous plantations operated by white indentured servants and Black slaves to do so. By the 1650s, Barbados had become the first English colony in the West Indies to export cotton to Europe. By the late 1700s and early 1800s, G. barbadense was a major commercial crop in the West Indies. After the early 19th century, it was mostly supplanted as a cash crop by sugar cane. There have been a few periods since the early 1800s when cotton production has been attractive in the West Indies, but generally sugar cane has been more profitable.

== Classification by staple length ==
Cotton traders use many systems to classify the quality of cotton fiber. One of the most significant distinctions is "staple length", length of the individual fibers. Traditionally, cultivars of Gossypium barbadense fall into the "long-staple" category. The term extra-long-staple (ELS) first came into use in 1907. The International Cotton Advisory Committee, in an attempt to standardize classification, defined extra-long-staple as 1 3/8 inches (35 mm) or longer, and long-staple as 1 1/8 to 1 5/16 inches (29 to 33 mm). Under this classification scheme, most cultivars of G. barbadense produce extra-long-staple fibers, but some cultivars qualify as long-staple.

== Cultivation ==
The species accounts for about 5% of the world's cotton production. Certain regions specialize in G. barbadense. One reason is to prevent different species of cotton from hybridizing with each other. If a field of G. barbadense is too close to a field of a different species, the result is generally poor quality of the fiber.

In historical times, G. barbadense was mostly a dooryard crop and treated as a perennial. Individual households would maintain one or a few bushes for years at a time. This form of cultivation continues to a small extent to the present. However, nearly all cotton production, G. barbadense or otherwise, are now row crops and treated as an annual. Plants are grown from seed each year.

== G. barbadense organized by market class ==
Traders in cotton have developed several broad categories called market classes. These categories are based on the characteristics of the fiber and the region where they are produced. In the United States, some market classes have been formalized in law.

=== Sea Island cotton ===
Sea Island is a historical market class. It was actively marketed from 1790 to 1920. It was grown on the Sea Islands, islands off the coast of South Carolina, Georgia, and Florida. It once was an important market class. In the markets of Europe, it suffered little competition from cottons with similar characteristics from its inception until the interruption of trade resulting from the U.S. Civil War.

==== Origins of Sea Island ====
The origins of Sea Island cotton has been the subject of considerable controversy. Nevertheless, developing the market class required developing cultivars that would be productive in the Sea Islands, and developing a product that was distinct from other kinds of cotton. It also required at least some producers and consumers to agree "Sea Island" was a useful category.

One of the challenges explaining the development of a long fiber cotton that would thrive in the Sea Islands is that the cotton in the Sea Islands came from the West Indies, an area where all the cultivated cotton was short fiber (by today's standards) and required a long growing season. A distinctive cotton could not be developed in the Sea Islands, at least not by the methods of hybridization or selection, because frost killed the plants before they had a chance to produce seed.

One possible explanation was that the changes happened accidentally in a region with long growing season and then were introduced to the Sea Islands. In the 1960s and 1970s, S. G. Stephens performed an experiment where he hybridized a G. barbadense with short coarse fibers and long growing season with a wild form of G. hirsutum that had the same short fiber and long growing season, but the fibers were fine. It seemed reasonable the resulting plant produced fine fibers, but was surprised to find it also had long fiber and short growing season. He then demonstrated this could be rather easily back-hybridized (see introgression) to form a cotton that retained these desirable characteristics, yet was almost entirely G. barbadense. He argued that such an event could have happened accidentally in the 18th century, resulting in the long, fine fiber G. barbadense of today. However, since this event could not have happened in the Sea Islands, it is not sufficient to explain the Sea Islands' distinctive product.

Unusual weather in 1785 and 1786 helped develop G. barbadense production in the Sea Islands. According to historical records, planters in Georgia were trying to introduce G. barbadense, but the plants would die from frost before they could produce seed or fiber. However, the winter of 1785-1786 was particularly mild, so a few plants did succeed in producing seed. The next generation of plants was able to produce seed and fiber before the winter.

Historical records credit Kinsey Burden of developing the particularly high-quality cotton that came to be associated with the Sea Islands. He accomplished this in the first decade of the 1800s via seed selection on Burden's Island and Johns Island in South Carolina. The Sea Islands region parted ways with the rest of the southeastern United States, specializing in this high-quality G. barbadense. Meanwhile, the rest of the southeastern United States developed its own market class "upland".

By 1803, the Charleston SC market recognized class distinctions of Sea Island, South Carolina upland, West Indian, and Mississippi.

What was called Sea Island cotton was cultivated on the Sea Islands, along the coasts of South Carolina and Georgia, especially by the late 18th century. Sea Island cotton commanded the highest price of all the cottons because of its long staple (1.5 to 2.5 inches, 38 to 64 mm) and silky texture; it was used for the finest cotton counts and often mixed with silk.

Although planters tried to grow it on the uplands of Georgia, the quality was inferior, and it was too expensive to process. The invention of the cotton gin by the end of the 18th century utterly changed the production of cotton as a commodity crop. It made processing of short-staple cotton profitable. This cotton, known as upland cotton (Gossypium hirsutum), could be grown successfully in the interior uplands. Short-staple cotton became the prime commodity crop of the developing Deep South, and King Cotton was the basis of southern wealth in the antebellum years. This cotton in the early 21st century represents about 95% of U.S. production.

Among the earliest planters of Sea Island cotton in North America was an Englishman, Francis Levett. Other cotton planters came from Barbados. At the outbreak of the American Revolution, Levett left his Georgia plantation and went to the Bahamas. He attempted to introduce cotton production, but failed. Sugar cane had been a more important commodity crop.

==== Sea Island cultivars ====
Sea Island planters could buy seed to plant each year, or they could plant seed saved from the previous year. Named cultivars resulted when particular planters gained a reputation for selecting the best seed to replant. Examples include "Seabrook", named after plantation proprietor William Seabrook, and "Bleak Hall", named after the plantation John Townsend managed. An incident in the early 20th century illustrates the importance of seed selection. The best seed selectors, in order to stop planters in the West Indies from benefiting from their work, they quit selling seed, even to their neighbors. This resulted in a decline in quality across the Sea Island region.

==== Demise of Sea Island ====
Sea island never fully recovered from the disruptions of the U.S. Civil War. In the early 20th century, the boll weevil caused tremendous damage in the traditional cotton-growing regions of the United States. Sea Island cultivars were particularly susceptible. Also, wet conditions on the islands moderated soil temperatures, further favoring the insect. Production of Sea Island on a commercial scale ended in 1920.

It was once widely believed the end of Sea Island as a market class also marked the end of the Sea Island cultivars. However, a few cultivars are still available, continuing to be used to improve modern cultivars and for other research. In the period from 2007 to 2019, the cultivar Bleak Hall was the third most requested kind of seed from the National Cotton Germplasm Collection's G. barbadense sub-collection. (Note: It is unclear whether Bleak Hall ranks third of all G. barbadense cultivars. Some of the National Cotton Germplasm Collection's samples of G. barbadense are in sub-collections other than the one designated "G. barbadense". Further, many of the cataloged samples are repeats or not cultivars.)

=== Egyptian ===
Egyptian is a market class representing G. barbadense grown in Egypt, and it also includes crops in Sudan, which was once part of Egypt. Sometimes the terms "Egyptian long-staple" and "Egyptian extra-long staple" are used, as Egypt and Sudan produce cottons with a variety of fiber lengths.

The development of the market class started in 1820, when Jumel's cotton entered commercial production. This was a type of cotton that had been growing in the region for some time, but a French engineer named Jumel recognized its potential as a source of fiber when he saw it growing as an ornamental in a garden in Cairo. Based on its description, it seems likely it was the recently developed long fiber kind of G. barbadense from the New World. Encouraged by the success of Jumel's cotton, Egyptians tested other seeds, including Sea Island. The next major cultivar in Egypt, "early Ashmouni," likely was a hybrid between Jumel and a Sea Island cultivar. Likewise, the following major cultivar, "Mit Afifi," likely was a hybrid between early Ashmouni and a Sea Island cultivar. Many more cultivars followed.

In the last half of the 19th century, cotton production in Egypt grew dramatically because of expansion of irrigation and increased demand because of the United States civil war. Egyptian cotton has been important ever since.

=== Pima ===
Pima is a name often used for cotton grown in the Southwestern United States. This market class consists of extra-long G. barbadense. It was originally known as "American Egyptian", but eventually the name "Pima" became more popular. Since the name "Pima" also has been applied to extra-long staple cotton growing in countries such as Peru, Australia, and Israel, sometimes the name "American Pima" is used to clarify the origin. The name "American Pima" was formally adopted by the United States government in 1970.

The American Pima market class was the result of government efforts to enable United States farmers to compete in the "Egyptian cotton" market. Circa 1900, the United States led in production of all the major market classes except Egyptian. H. J. Webber and others in the United States Department of Agriculture believed Egyptian long-staple would thrive under irrigation in the deserts of the southwestern United States. On behalf of the USDA, David Fairchild visited Egypt in 1902 and brought back a few Egyptian cultivars. A USDA team led by Thomas H. Kearney selected among these cultivars, (Note: Sources differ which Egyptian cultivar became the basis for American Pima. Fairchild says it was Jannovich whereas Kearnsey said Mit Afifi.) and after a decade of refinement, released the first cultivar successful in the southwestern United States.

This first commercially successful cultivar was named "Yuma", after the Arizona town near the experiment station where it was developed. Kearney's second successful cultivar was "Pima". (Note: The market class "Pima" was almost certainly named after the cultivar "Pima". Sources differ on the origin of the name of the cultivar. The botanist Porcher and the historian Bess say it was named after the Gila River Indian Community (Pima Reservation), the home of the cooperative testing and demonstration farm where the cultivar was developed. Many other sources, such as a glossary published by the Congressional Research Service, say it was named in honor of the Akimel O'odham (Pima Indians) who helped raise the cotton at the demonstration farm.) The cultivar Pima dominated irrigated lands in the southwestern United States from 1918 to as late as 1941, when other cultivars became more popular.

As of 2005, American Pima accounts for less than 5% of U.S. cotton production. It is grown chiefly in California, with small acreages in West Texas, New Mexico and Arizona.

=== Sea Island of the Caribbean ===
The market class “Sea Island of the Caribbean” developed from efforts to revitalize cotton production in the Caribbean region. It never became a major crop for the region, nevertheless the market class is significant for the luxury market.

G. barbadense has been grown in the West Indies, and more broadly in the Caribbean region on a small scale since antiquity. It became one of the region's major crops in the 18th century. This was the traditional form of the species, as varieties with long fibers had not yet been developed. However, Caribbean producers all but abandoned cotton production in the nineteenth century, when sugar cane became more lucrative. Then, the market for sugar cane declined, leading Caribbean growers to seek another crop. Commercial quantities of long-fiber G. barbasense seeds first came to the Caribbean in 1902. From this developed the “Sea Island of the Caribbean” market class.

For a few years, the Caribbean producers were using seed from the Sea Islands, despite those cultivars being selected for a different climate. Then the Sea Island producers quit exporting their cultivars, resulting in the genetics of the cotton in the two regions diverging.

Today, Sea Island of the Caribbean both benefits and suffers from the reputation of the Sea Island cotton of the nineteenth century. On the one hand, it enjoys the reputation of the finest quality fiber. On the other hand, one reason Caribbean residents are reluctant to produce it is its historical association with slavery.

=== Tanguis ===
Although Tanguis represents a tiny fraction of the worldwide market, it is remarkable because it was developed relatively recently from local populations in G. barbadense's home territory of Peru. Although it produces fiber shorter and rougher than other modern market classes, it has unique properties useful for certain industrial applications. It accounts for the majority of Peru's cotton production (about 80% in 2011).

== Uses ==
Most G. barbadense production comes from cultivars that produce particularly long fiber, and most of that is made into clothing. Fine (thin) yarn requires long fiber. In turn, this thin yarn is required for intermediate products like lace and high thread-count cloth. The long-fiber cultivars also tend to have particularly strong fibers, making them useful for various industrial products. Historically, G. barbadense has been used for the cords of automobile tires and cloth for aircraft wings. It is also used for sewing machine thread.

G. barbadense fiber is also used for some luxury goods where the fiber qualities are less important than the reputation of the best quality materials.

Some growers have established trademarks for yarn or finished items made of G. barbadense fiber. Caribbean producers banded together in 1933 to form the West Indian Sea Island Cotton Association. The organization allows makers of yarn and finished goods to use the “WISICA” trademark, provided the items are made from Sea Island of the Caribbean cotton and meet certain quality requirements. Likewise, a group of southwestern United States growers established the trademark Supima for products made of American Pima fiber.

Small quantities of Tanguis and other short-fibered cultivars are grown for specialized purposes.

G. barbadense can be used as a source of cottonseed oil and animal feed. However, other kinds of cotton generally are preferred because G. barbadense seeds contain more of the undesirable substance gossypol.
