= South Garden, Virginia =

South Garden, Virginia may refer to:

- South Garden, Albemarle County, Virginia, location of NRHP-registered Sunny Bank
- South Garden, Richmond, Virginia
