= South Garden, Richmond, Virginia =

Unincorporated community in Virginia, US

Coordinates: 37°29′01″N 77°29′29″W

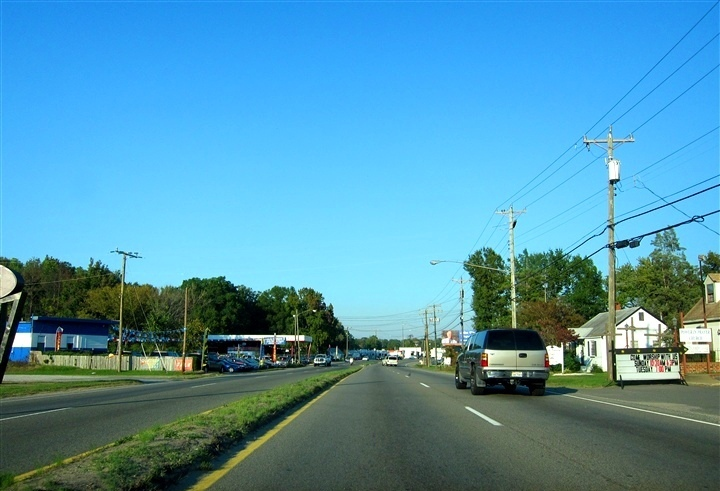
South Garden on Hull Street Road, heading north.

South Garden is an unincorporated community in Richmond City, in the U.S. state of Virginia.
