= Romiley =

Village in Greater Manchester, England

Coordinates: 53.41128°N 2.08421°W

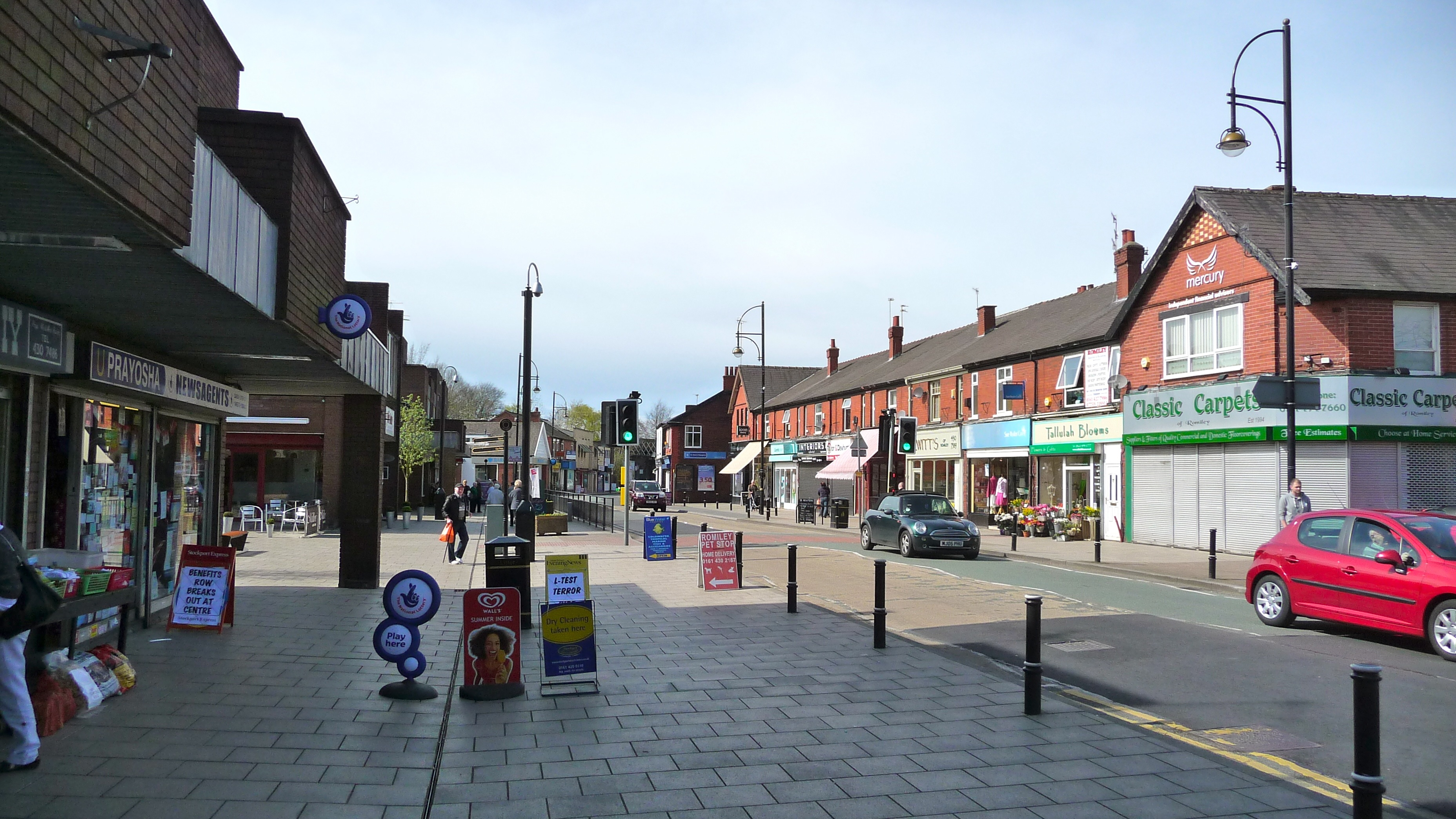
- Stockport Road in Romiley, 2011

- Location within Greater Manchester
- Population: 10,900 (Built up area, 2021)
- OS grid reference: SJ945905
- Metropolitan borough: Stockport
- Metropolitan county: Greater Manchester
- Region: North West
- Country: England
- Sovereign state: United Kingdom
- Post town: STOCKPORT
- Postcode district: SK6
- Dialling code: 0161
- Police: Greater Manchester
- Fire: Greater Manchester
- Ambulance: North West
- UK Parliament: Hazel Grove

Romiley is a village within the Metropolitan Borough of Stockport, Greater Manchester, England. Historically part of Cheshire, it borders Marple, Bredbury and Woodley. At the 2021 census, the built up area had a population of 10,900.

== History ==
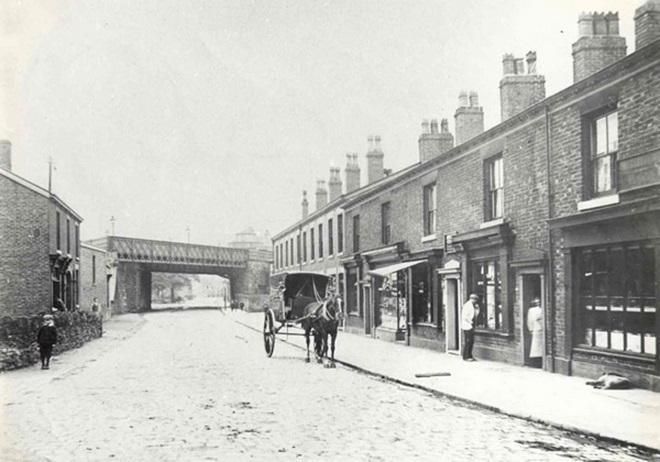
Compstall Road in Romiley, 1905

Romiley (or Rvmelie in Medieval Latin) is documented in the Domesday Book of 1086 as being predominantly agricultural, with 16 ploughlands (areas defined as 120 acres each) and 9 square leagues of woodland. It had no recorded population.

Romiley's agricultural nature continued during the centuries leading up to the late Victorian era, when it became a residential area with a small district centre.

The Peak Forest Canal flows around the west and south of Romiley. It was completed in 1805. Although much of the canal fell into disuse by the early 1960s, it was restored and subsequently reopened in April 1974.

== Governance ==
There is one main tier of local government covering Romiley, at metropolitan borough level: Stockport Metropolitan Borough Council. The council is a member of the Greater Manchester Combined Authority, which is led by the directly-elected Mayor of Greater Manchester. Romiley forms part of the Bredbury Green and Romiley electoral ward for elections to the council.

For national representation, Romiley forms part of the Hazel Grove constituency.

=== Administrative history ===
Romiley was historically a township and chapelry in the ancient parish of Stockport, which formed part of the Macclesfield Hundred of Cheshire. From the 17th century onwards, parishes were gradually given various civil functions under the poor laws, in addition to their original ecclesiastical functions. In some cases, including Stockport, the civil functions were exercised by each township separately rather than the parish as a whole. In 1866, the legal definition of 'parish' was changed to be the areas used for administering the poor laws, and so Romiley became a civil parish.

In 1880, Romiley was added to the local government district of Bredbury, which had been created in 1865, and the district was renamed Bredbury and Romiley. Local government districts were reconstituted as urban districts under the Local Government Act 1894.

Romiley continued to form a civil parish within the Bredbury and Romiley Urban District after 1894, but as an urban parish it had no parish council. The parishes within the urban district were united into a single parish called Bredbury and Romiley in 1936, when the district was also enlarged to take in Compstall and there were more minor adjustments to the boundaries with neighbouring areas. In 1931 (the last census before its abolition), Romiley parish had a population of 3,722.

Bredbury and Romiley Urban District was abolished in 1974 under the Local Government Act 1972. The area became part of the Metropolitan Borough of Stockport in Greater Manchester.

== Education ==
There are four primary schools: Romiley Primary School, Bredbury Green Primary School, St. Christopher's Catholic Primary School and Greave Primary School (which is on the border with Woodley).

Secondary education is provided by Werneth School and Harrytown Catholic High School in Bredbury, with much of the suburb being in the catchment area for Marple Hall School in nearby Marple.

== Amenities ==
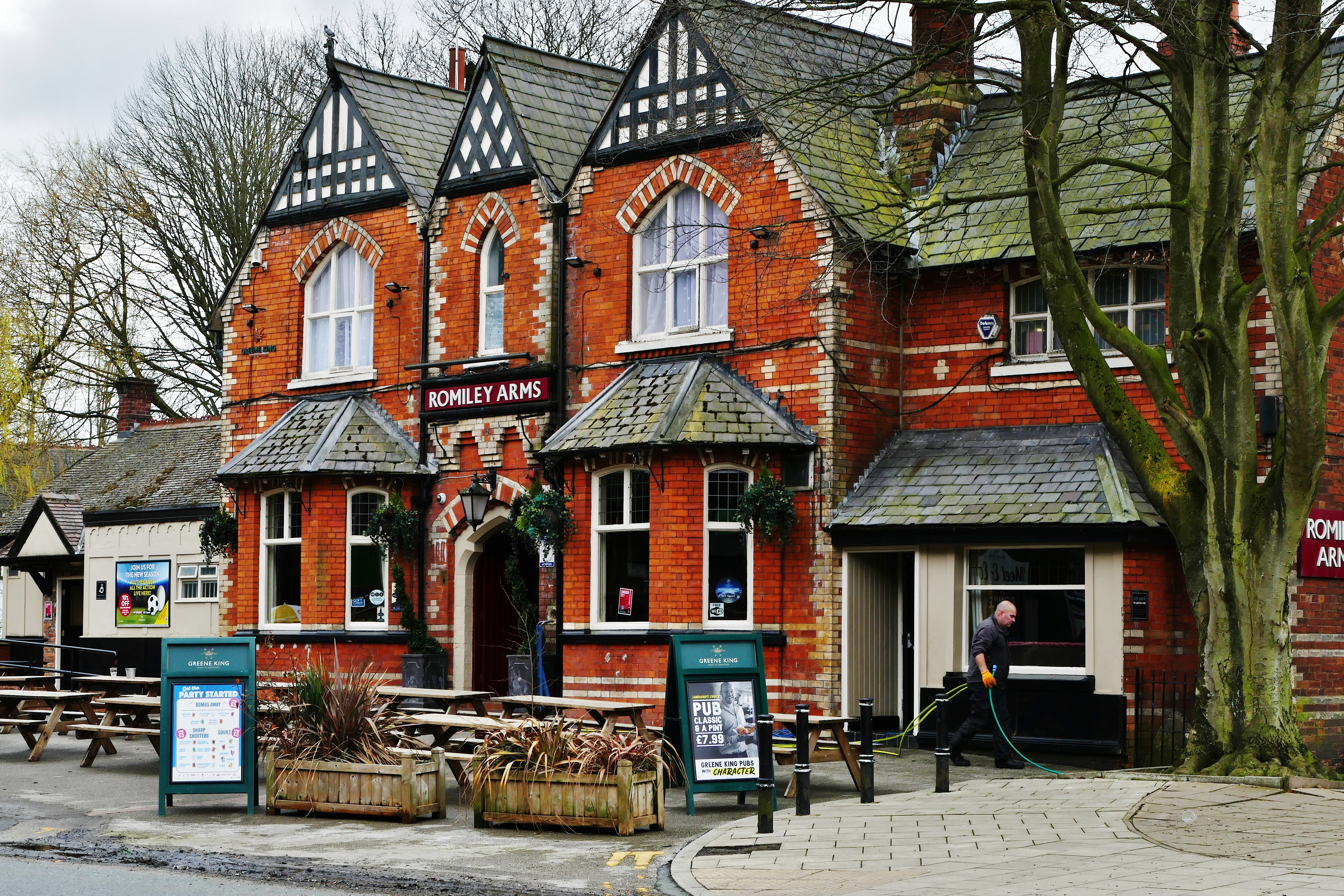
Romiley Arms

Romiley has its own theatre, the Forum Theatre. This is a building owned by Stockport Council but, since 2003, has been managed by NK Theatre Arts, a registered charity which provides all-inclusive performing arts workshops for children, young people and adults. The theatre is also used by many other local community groups in Stockport.

There are many pubs in Romiley, including The Friendship Inn, Romiley Arms, Platform One, Duke of York and Stock Dove.

== Geography ==
Romiley's surroundings are rural, although it is a suburb, with fields to the north, south and east. The nearby village of Compstall, situated between Romiley and Marple Bridge, is home to the Etherow Country Park. The park lies at the heart of the Etherow/Goyt Valley; it was one of Britain's first country parks and is one of the most widely visited parks in Stockport.

== Transport ==
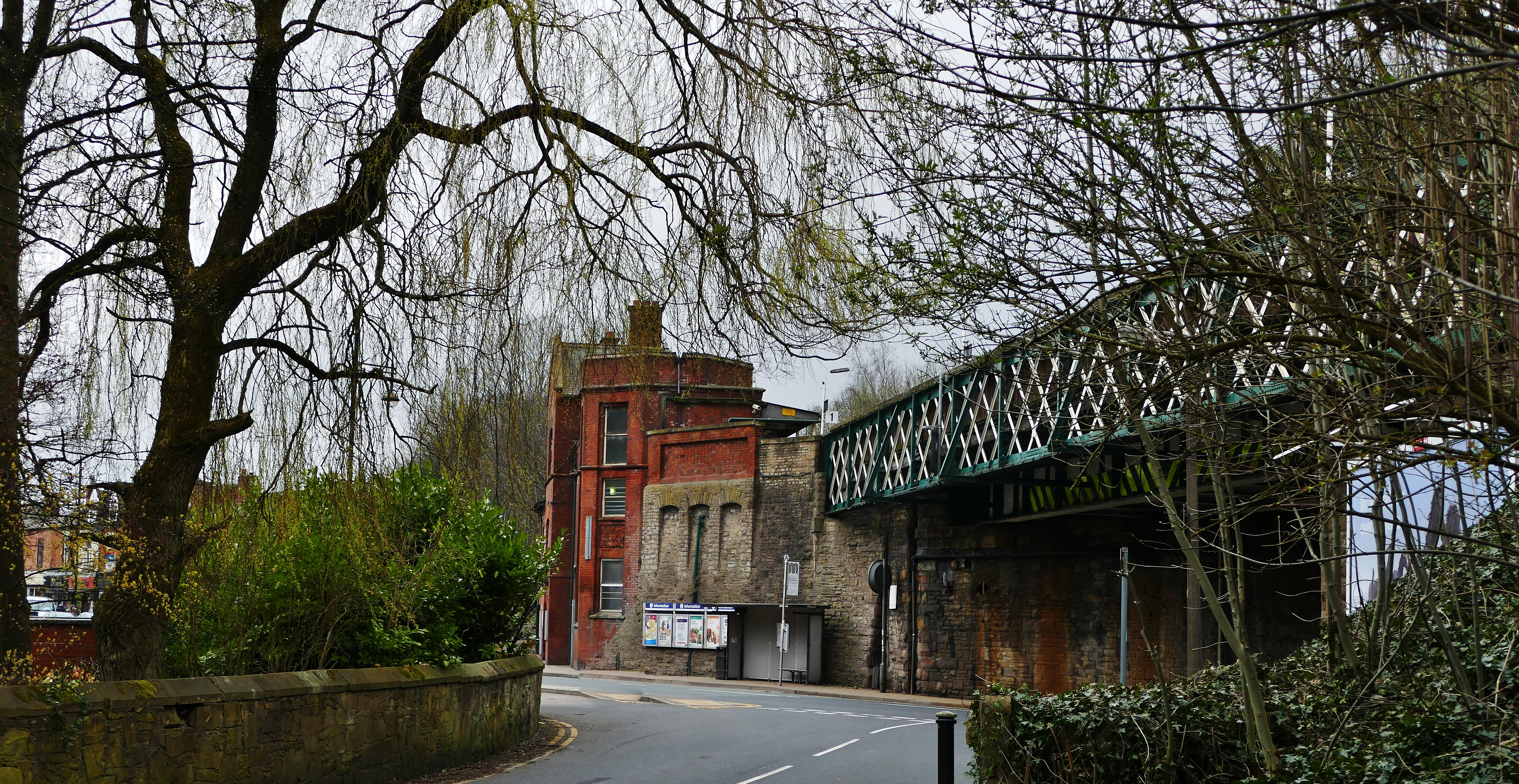
Romiley station, from Beech Lane

The suburb is served by Romiley railway station, which is on the Hope Valley Line between Sheffield and Manchester Piccadilly. Services run westbound to Manchester Piccadilly, either via Bredbury or Woodley; eastbound trains travel either to Rose Hill Marple or to Marple and beyond to New Mills Central and Sheffield.

Romiley is served by several bus services, which are operated by Stagecoach Manchester. The most regular services run on a Stockport circular route to Bredbury and Portwood (383 anticlockwise), and to Marple and Offerton (384 clockwise). There is also an hourly 382 service, which runs from Stockport to/from Woodley, via Romiley.

== Conservation areas ==
Romiley contains four conservation areas, a designation made by the local council to protect locations which have special architectural or historical character. They help reduce traffic, preserve wildlife and important landscapes; they restrict making changes which affect the look of the area, such as changing front doors, roofing, facades or windows.

The four conservation areas are:

- Barlow Fold (1997, reviewed in 2006) is around 0.5 miles (0.80 km) to the north-east of Romiley village centre and 4 miles (6.4 km) north-east of Stockport. The conservation area covers 0.39 hectares and contains 12 households.
- Chadkirk (2006) is a quiet rural retreat lying approximately 0.5 miles (0.80 km) south of the centre of Romiley. It comprises farmlands, a 17th-century farmhouse, outbuildings, a Victorian walled garden and the 16th-century Chadkirk Chapel; it forms an oasis of peace and tranquility, surrounded on three sides by ancient woodlands and the River Goyt which flows alongside.
- Church Lane (1996, extended in 2006). This is essentially a late 19th-century railway suburb, overlaying the lanes and fields of a former agricultural area; it developed following the opening of Romiley railway station in 1862; however, it has the form and character of a village or earlier community as the area is focused around the landmark church of St Chad (1864–66).
- Greave Fold (1996, reviewed 2006) is 0.5 miles (0.80 km) north of Romiley village centre and approximately 4 miles (6.4 km) north-east of Stockport. The conservation area covers 2.31 hectares and contains 48 households.

A further conservation area adjoins Romiley at Hatherlow in Bredbury.

== Notable people ==
- Julia Britton (1914–2012), an Australian playwright of literary adaptations and biographical plays.
- Sir Charles Mantell (1937—2010), a barrister who served as a High Court judge and a Lord Justice of Appeal.
- Dame Hilary Mantel (1952–2022), a writer who wrote historical fiction, personal memoirs and short stories; lived locally when young
- George Thornewell (1898–1986), a footballer who played 400 games including 275 for Derby County and 4 for England
- Sir Frederic C Williams (1911–1977), an engineer, and pioneer in radar and computer technology

== Gallery ==
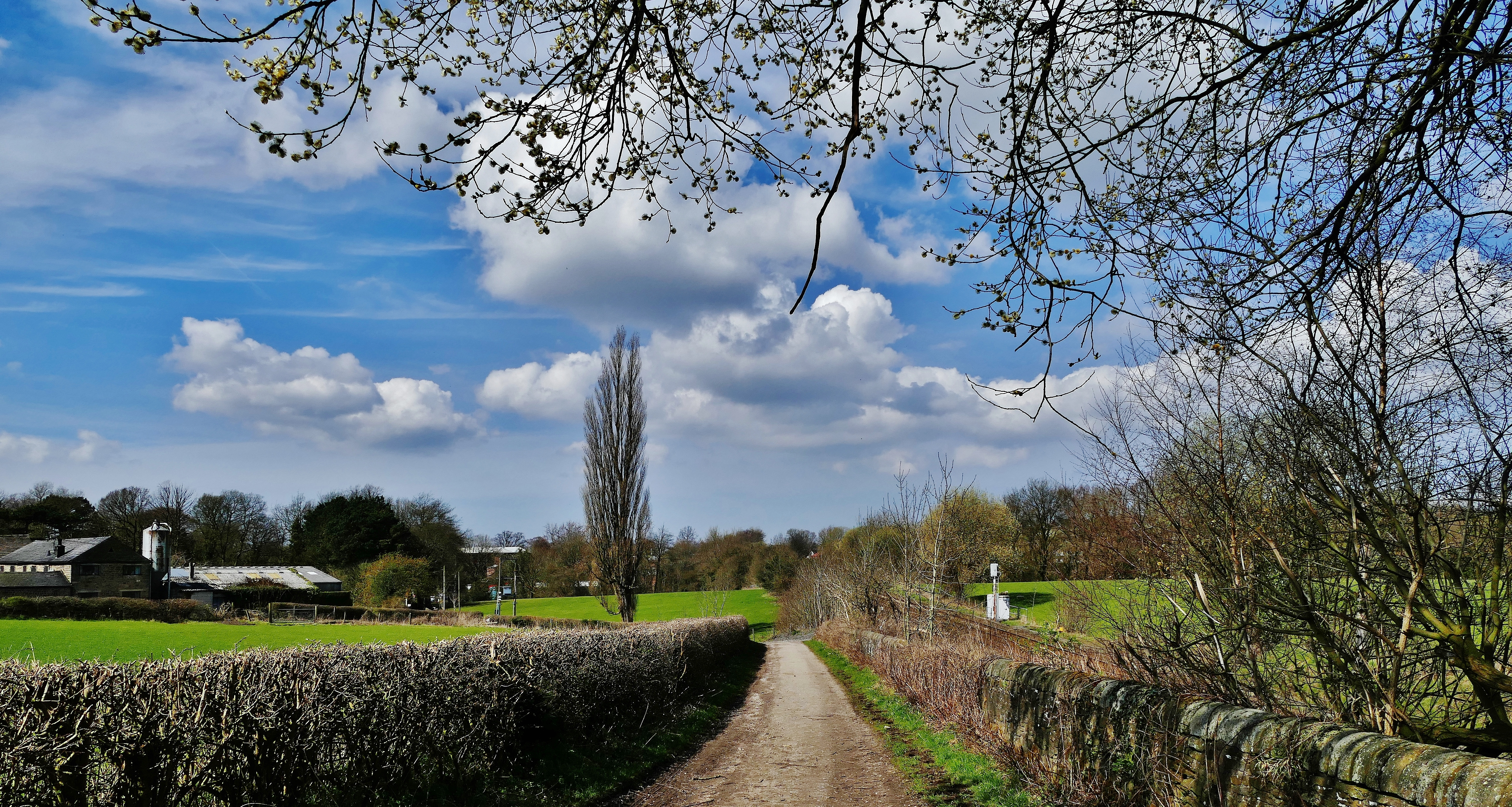
Hyde Bank Farm

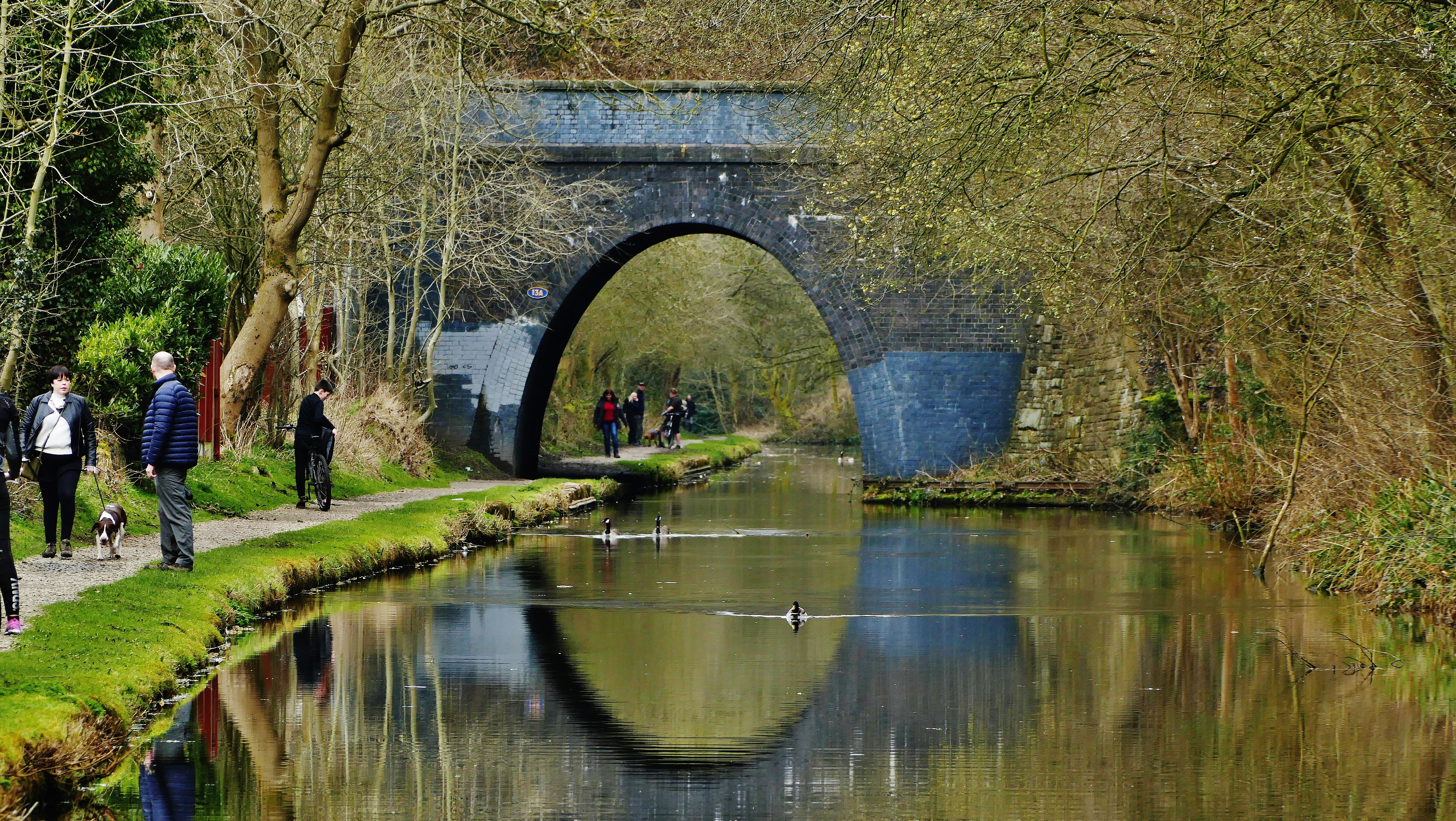
Peak Forest Canal

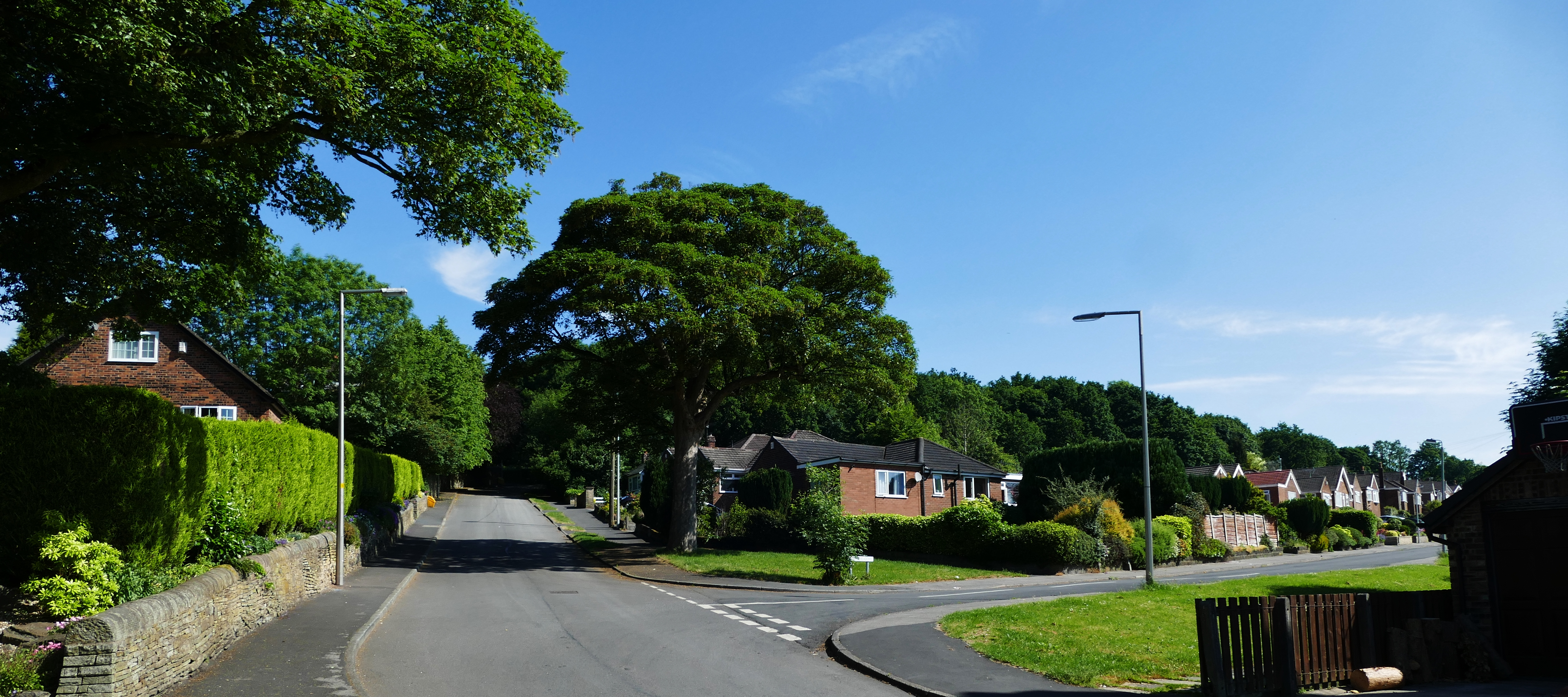
High Meadows

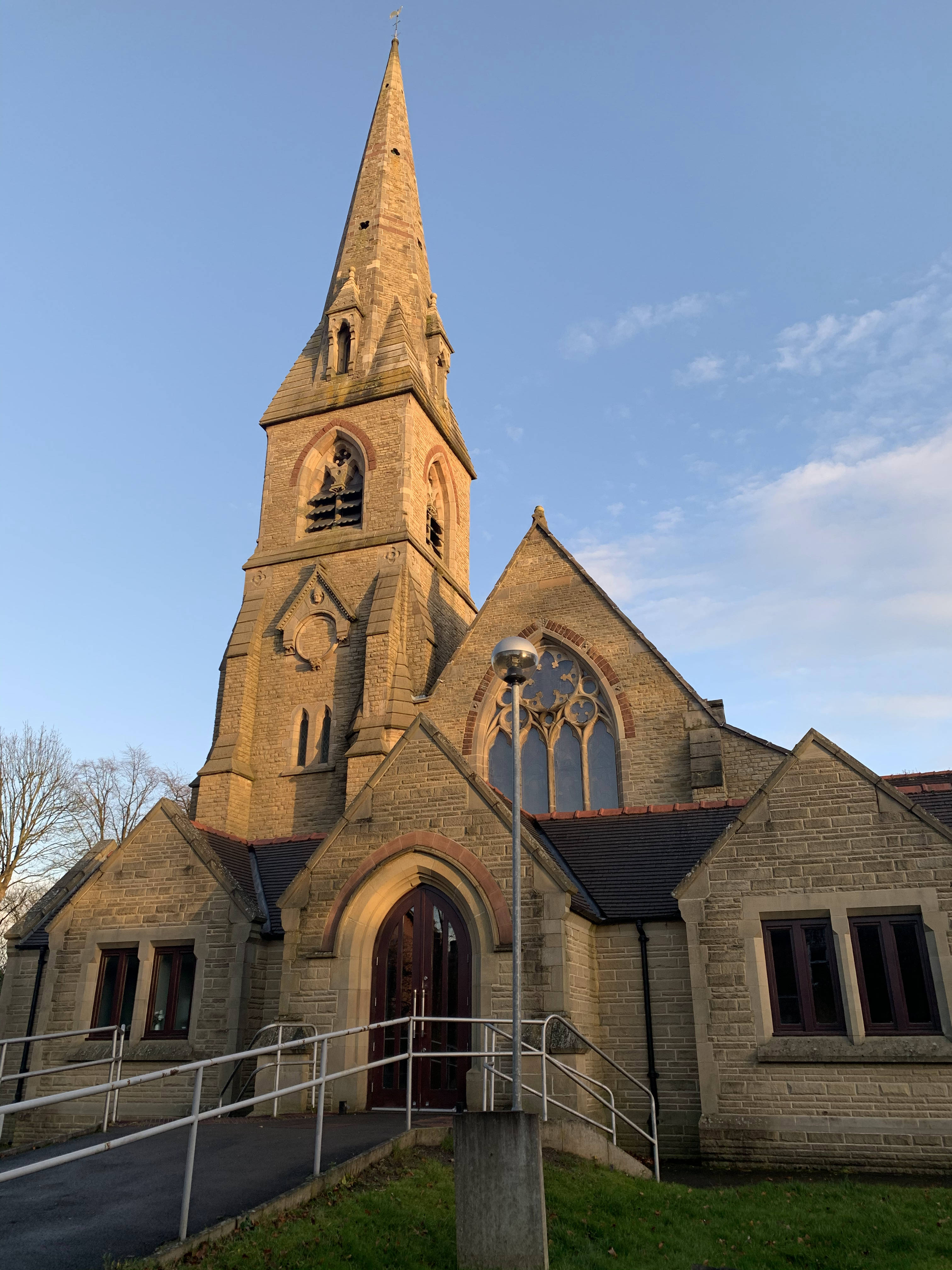
St Chad's church

== See also ==
- Listed buildings in Bredbury and Romiley
