= Compstall =

Village in Greater Manchester, England

Coordinates: 53.414°N 2.054°W

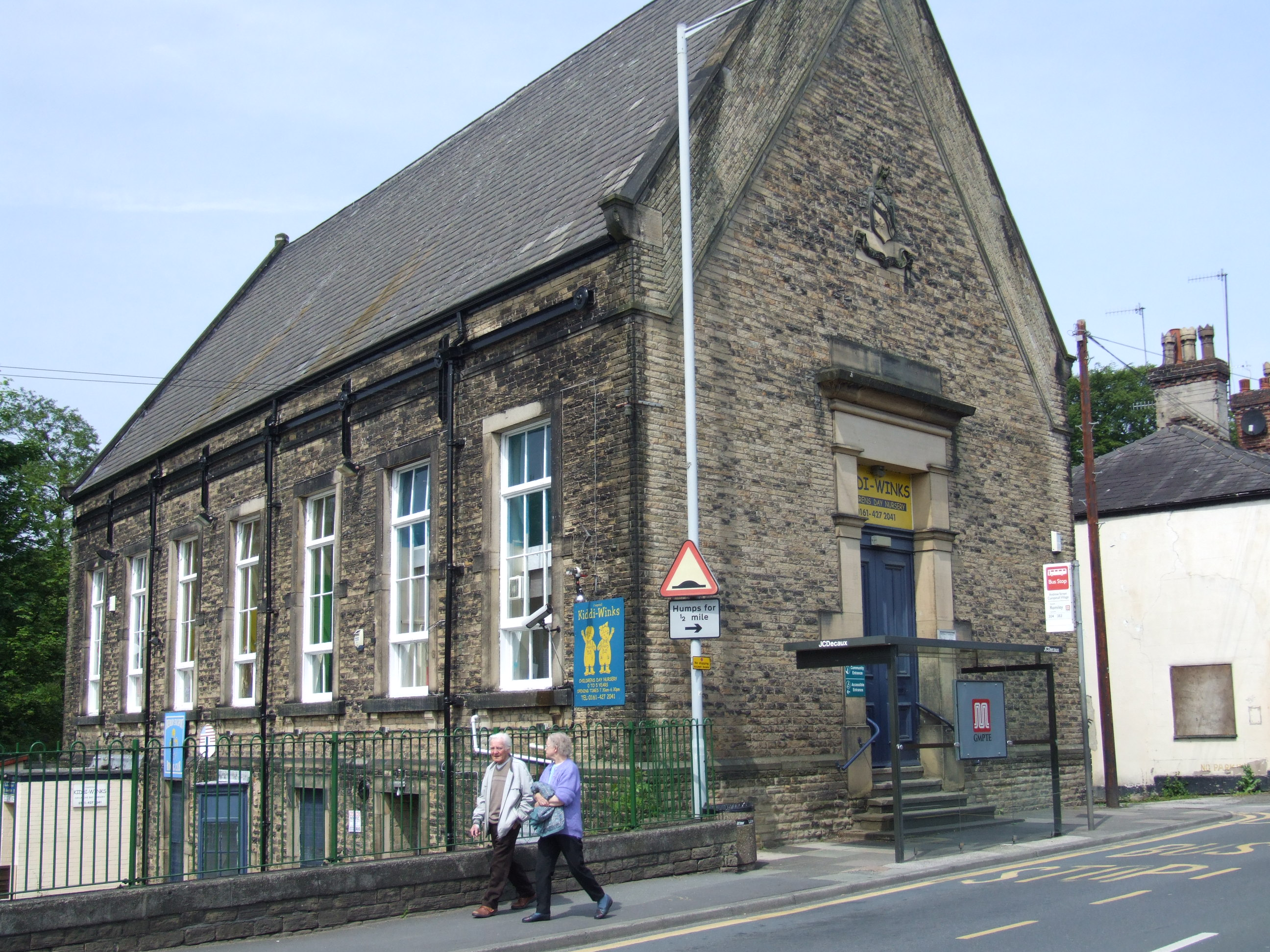
- The Athenaeum

- Location within Greater Manchester
- OS grid reference: SJ963908
- Metropolitan borough: Stockport
- Metropolitan county: Greater Manchester
- Region: North West
- Country: England
- Sovereign state: United Kingdom
- Post town: STOCKPORT
- Postcode district: SK6
- Dialling code: 0161
- Police: Greater Manchester
- Fire: Greater Manchester
- Ambulance: North West
- UK Parliament: Hazel Grove

Compstall is a village in the Metropolitan Borough of Stockport, Greater Manchester, England, between Marple Bridge and Romiley. Historically part of Cheshire, it was formerly a mill village built by George Andrew in the 1820s to house his 800 workers; most of the original mill cottages and other structures remain unchanged.

The waterways were constructed to carry water from the weir, on the River Etherow, to turn the mill wheels. A water wheel called Big Lily was the largest in England when it was built in 1839. The former millpond forms part of Etherow Country Park, one of the oldest country parks in England.

== History ==
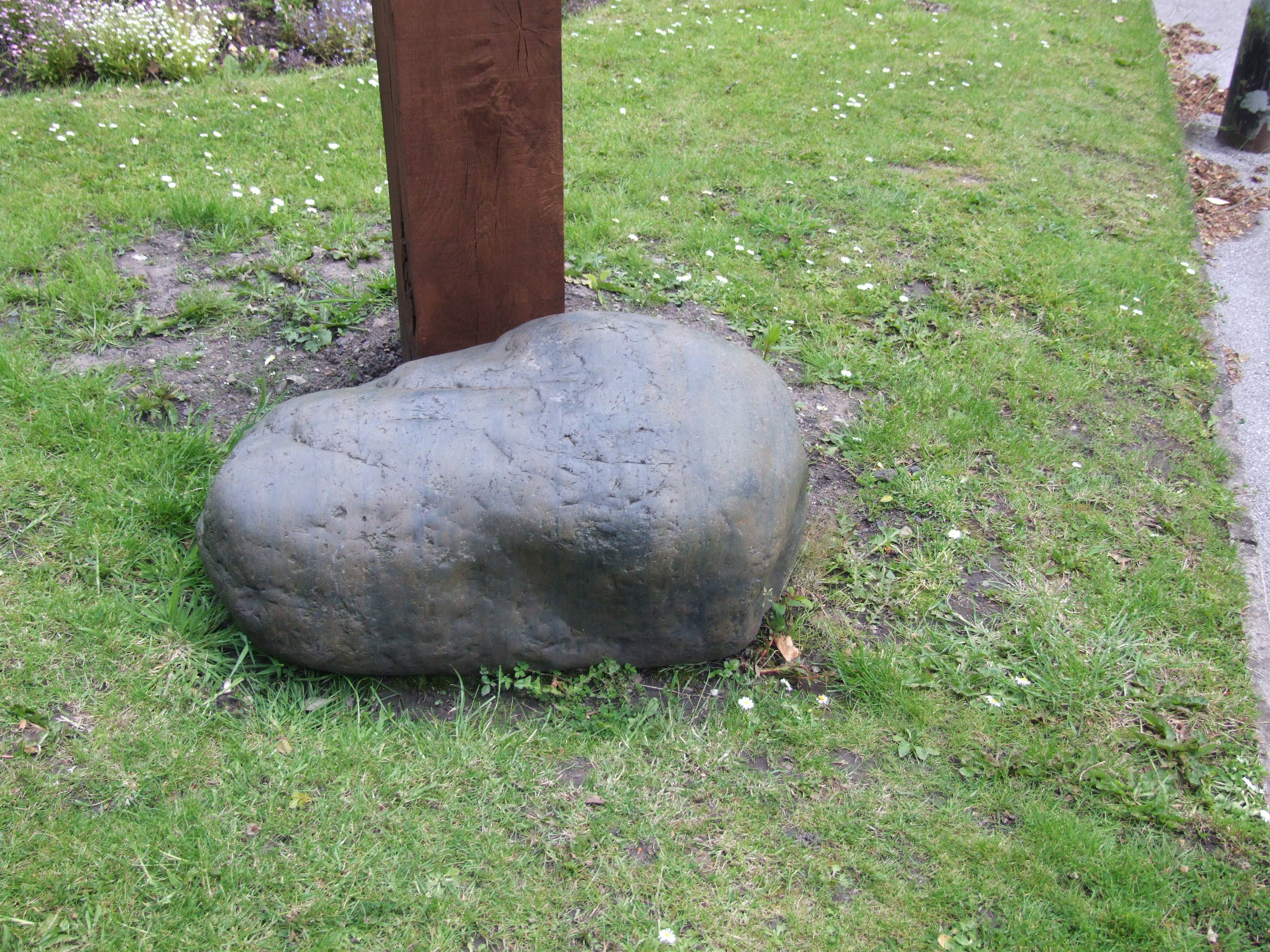
The Touch Stone marks where deals were made in the Market Place

Compstall was first noted as a place where farmers would meet to trade and sell their sheep, which were held at Barlow Fold, Greave Fold, Ratcliffe Fold, Beacom Fold and Lower Fold. The Touch Stone in the market place marks where deals were made; it is a glacial erratic deposited during the last ice age. Once a deal was agreed, the parties would spit on their hands and hit the stone, sealing the deal.

In 1804, the Andrew family established a water-driven calico printing business downstream from the present mill site. In 1821, Thomas Andrew died; the Manchester Guardian of 22 September recorded "On Friday morning the 14th inst. suddenly of angina pectoris, under which he had laboured for some years, Thomas Andrew, Esq, of Harpurhey aged 68. He has left a widow and numerous family to lament his loss." His son, George Andrew I, reorganised the business. He built a water-powered cotton mill and a reservoir to power the wheels; he had a steam engine to provide backup power. The earliest workers' cottages had been built in the southern side of the bridge in 1806; in 1823, cottages were built along Market Street on the north side and this became the heart of the village. With further mills, further houses were added to the north of the village and, by 1839, the village was almost complete.

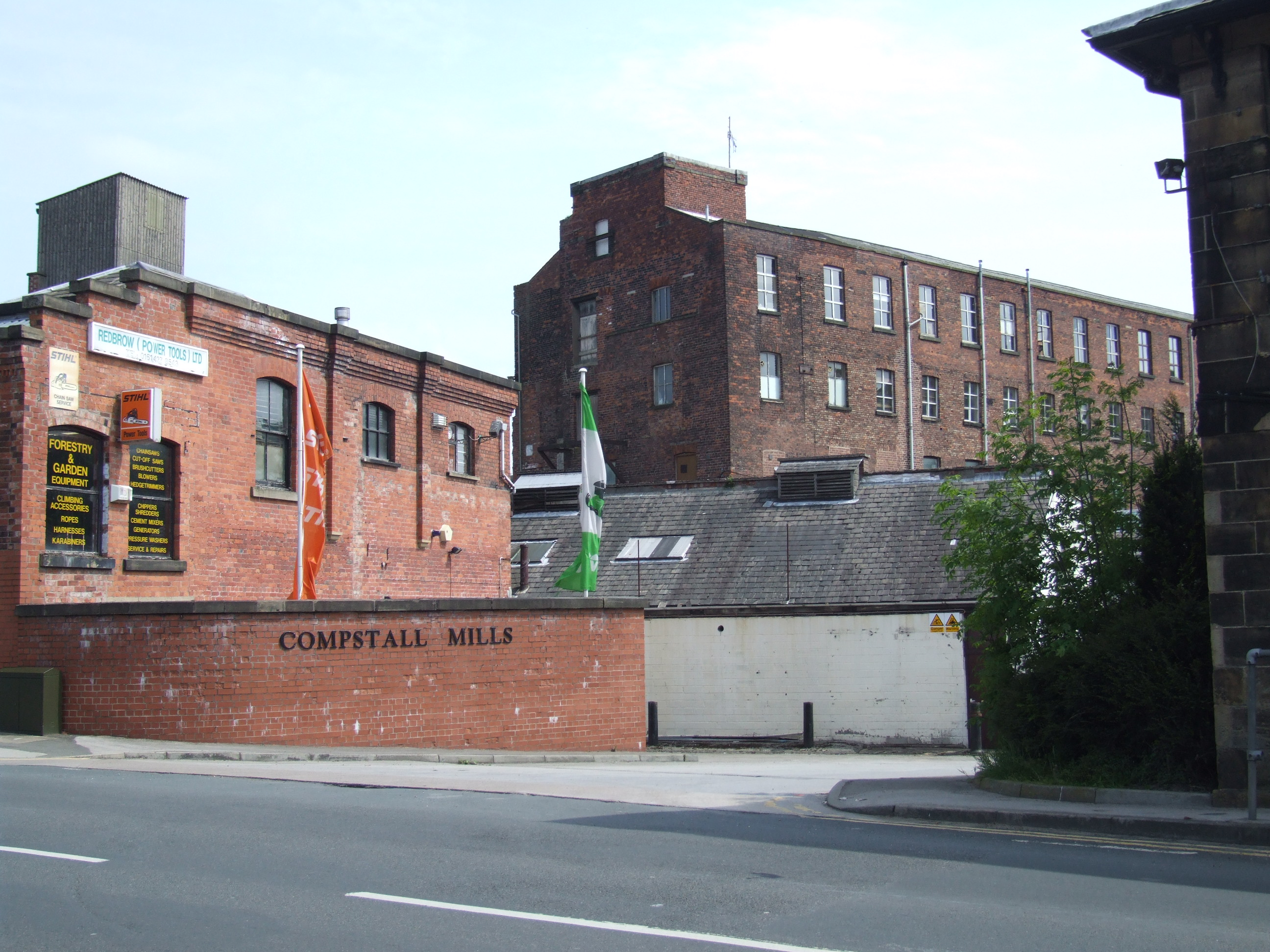
The first calico printing works was opened by Thomas Andrew downstream of the bridge.

A Co-op store was opened in 1851 and further shops followed. The first church was the Wesleyan Methodist Chapel. The Andrews family built the multipurpose Athenaeum in 1865. St Paul's Church of England church was built in the Early English style.

Steam and gas lighting were installed in the mill by 1890 and these were replaced by electricity in 1915.

== Compstall Mills ==
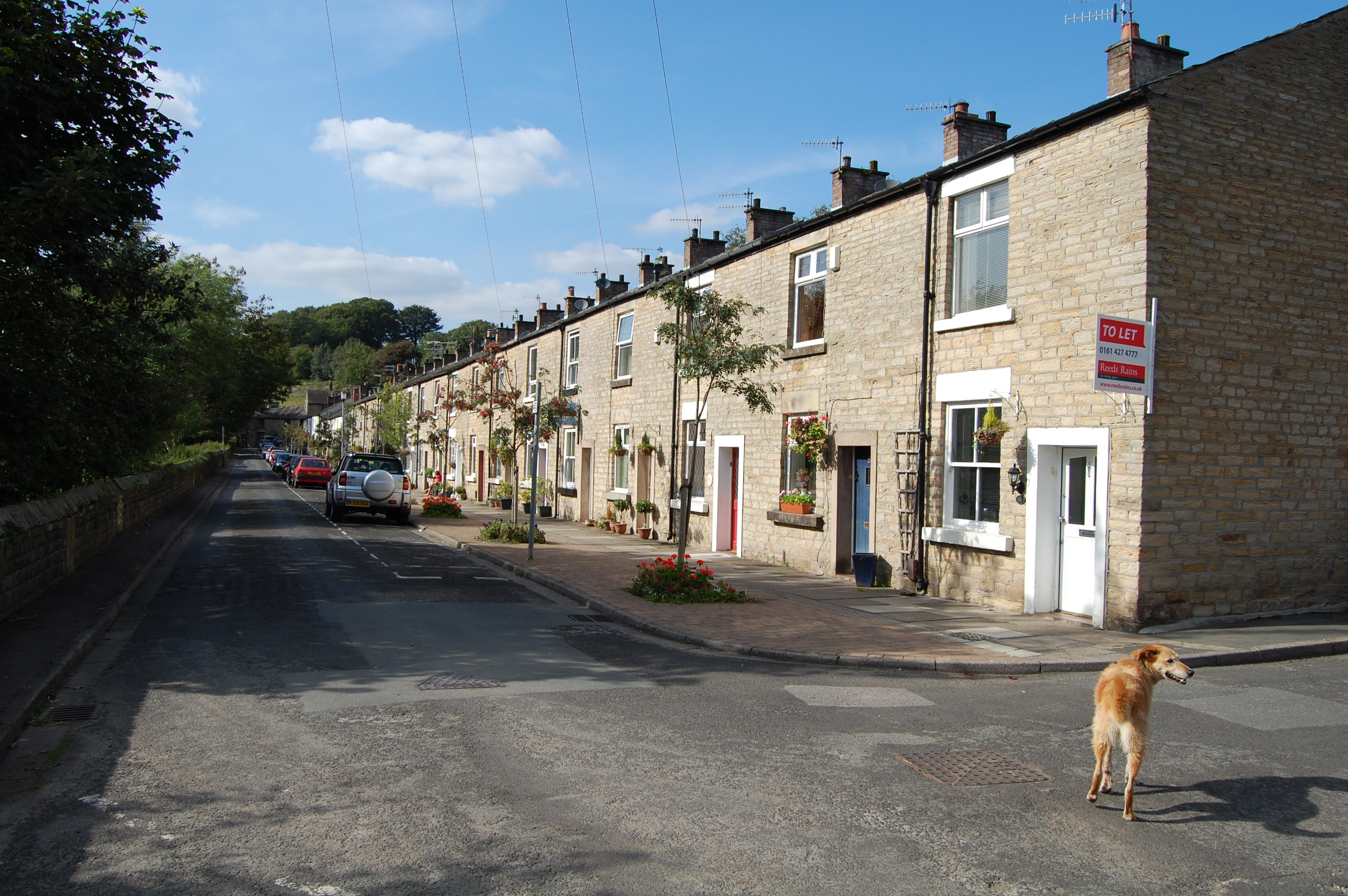
The cottages on Montagu Street were built by George Andrew to house his mill workers.

George Andrew experimented with printing; then, on the death of his father, started on the mill complex on the site known today. Between 1833 and 1833, he built Old Mill, a five-storey L-shaped building that fronted on the river and on Market Street. At its north end, there was a four-storey building that housed the water wheel. During the six years from 1833 to 1839, the Scotland Mill, the Victoria Mill, Provans Mill and Noah's Ark weaving sheds were built. The first two water wheels, Old Josh and North Wheel, were supplemented by the giant Lily Wheel in 1838; this was 17 ft (5.2 m) wide and 50 ft (15 m) in diameter and was built by Fairburn and Lillie.

The North Mill was added between 1839 and 1847 and the mill office was extended. The Albert Mill and a range of riverside buildings, including the mechanics shop, were extended between 1847 and 1872. Over the next 25 years, many extra weaving sheds were added and extended. By 1907, a new engine house had been added.

=== Future developments ===
After a long period of consultation, planning permission was sought in July 2009 to restore and redevelop the site. It was proposed that there should be 121 residential units and 25,136 square feet (2,335.2 m^{2}) of commercial space. The Victoria and Albert Mills would be refurbished to create 58 apartments. The Engine House would be restored and house the existing electricity sub-station and provide industrial space. The boiler house, with its traces of the Lily Wheel pit, would be restored and be used as commercial space. The Scotland Mill would be demolished and replaced with the New Scotland Mill with 32 two-bedroom duplex apartments overlooking the Country Park. The building would mirror the length, height and form of the original mill, using complementary materials. New 3- and 4-bedroom terraced family houses would be built along the north bank of the river where the mechanic shop once stood. A new clubhouse for Etherow Country Park Sailing Club would be built on or near the site of the now demolished Noah's Ark shed.

As with any scheme, there would be landscaping, the site would be tidied, parking provided and public open spaces constructed.

== Other landmarks ==
Compstall Hall was built by George Andrew in 1825 in the Grecian Villa style, with an imposing driveway and entrance. It was owned by James Walton during the 1850s.

Compstall Bridge is a Grade II listed building and carries the B6104 road over the River Etherow.

== Etherow Country Park ==
Etherow Country Park was established in 1968; covering 240 acres, it is one of the oldest country parks in England and one of the most widely visited in Stockport. The park includes several millponds and other industrial relics alongside the River Etherow.

The Goyt Way starts in the park, running for a distance of 10 miles (16 km) through Compstall, Marple and New Mills to Whaley Bridge in Derbyshire.

== Governance ==
There is one main tier of local government covering Compstall, at metropolitan borough level: Stockport Metropolitan Borough Council. The council is a member of the Greater Manchester Combined Authority, which is led by the directly-elected Mayor of Greater Manchester.

=== Administrative history ===
Compstall was historically part of the ancient parish of Stockport, which formed part of the Macclesfield Hundred of Cheshire. Stockport parish was subdivided into townships; the western of part Compstall village was in the Romiley township, but the main part of the village to the east was in the Werneth township (not to be confused with the other Werneth, 8 miles (10 km) to the north in Oldham). The River Etherow formed the county boundary with Derbyshire; the area south of the river was in the Ludworth township of Glossop.

From the 17th century onwards, parishes were gradually given various civil functions under the poor laws, in addition to their original ecclesiastical functions. In some cases, including Stockport, the civil functions were exercised by each township separately rather than the parish as a whole. In 1866, the legal definition of 'parish' was changed to be the areas used for administering the poor laws, and so Romiley and Werneth each became civil parishes.

From 1877, the part of Werneth north of the hill of Werneth Low, which area included the village of Gee Cross, was included in the local government district of Hyde, which became a municipal borough in 1881. From 1880, Romiley parish was included in the Bredbury and Romiley local government district.

The Local Government Act 1894 said that civil parishes were no longer allowed to straddle borough boundaries, and so Werneth was reduced to just cover the area outside the borough of Hyde. Compstall was thereafter the largest settlement in the parish, and so in 1897 the civil parish of Werneth was formally renamed Compstall.

In 1902, Compstall parish was made an urban district. It was relatively small for an urban district; it had a population of just 865 in 1931 (the last census before it was abolished). The parish and urban district of Compstall were abolished in 1936. Most of the area, including the village, became part of Bredbury and Romiley Urban District, and a smaller area was transferred to the borough of Hyde. Also in 1936, Ludworth was transferred from Derbyshire to Cheshire and incorporated into Marple. Bredbury and Romiley Urban District was abolished in 1974 and its area became part of the metropolitan borough of Stockport in Greater Manchester.

== Transport ==
=== Buses ===
There are regular bus services on a circular route to and from Stockport town centre: the 383 travels anticlockwise to Romiley, Bredbury and Portwood; and the 384 clockwise to Marple Bridge, Marple and Offerton.

=== Railway ===
Compstall does not have its own railway station; the nearest is over a mile away at Marple. It is a stop on the Hope Valley Line between Sheffield, New Mills Central and Manchester Piccadilly. Services are generally half-hourly on Mondays to Saturdays, hourly on Sundays.

== See also ==
- Listed buildings in Bredbury and Romiley
