= Bredbury =

Town in Greater Manchester, England

Coordinates: 53.420°N 2.113°W

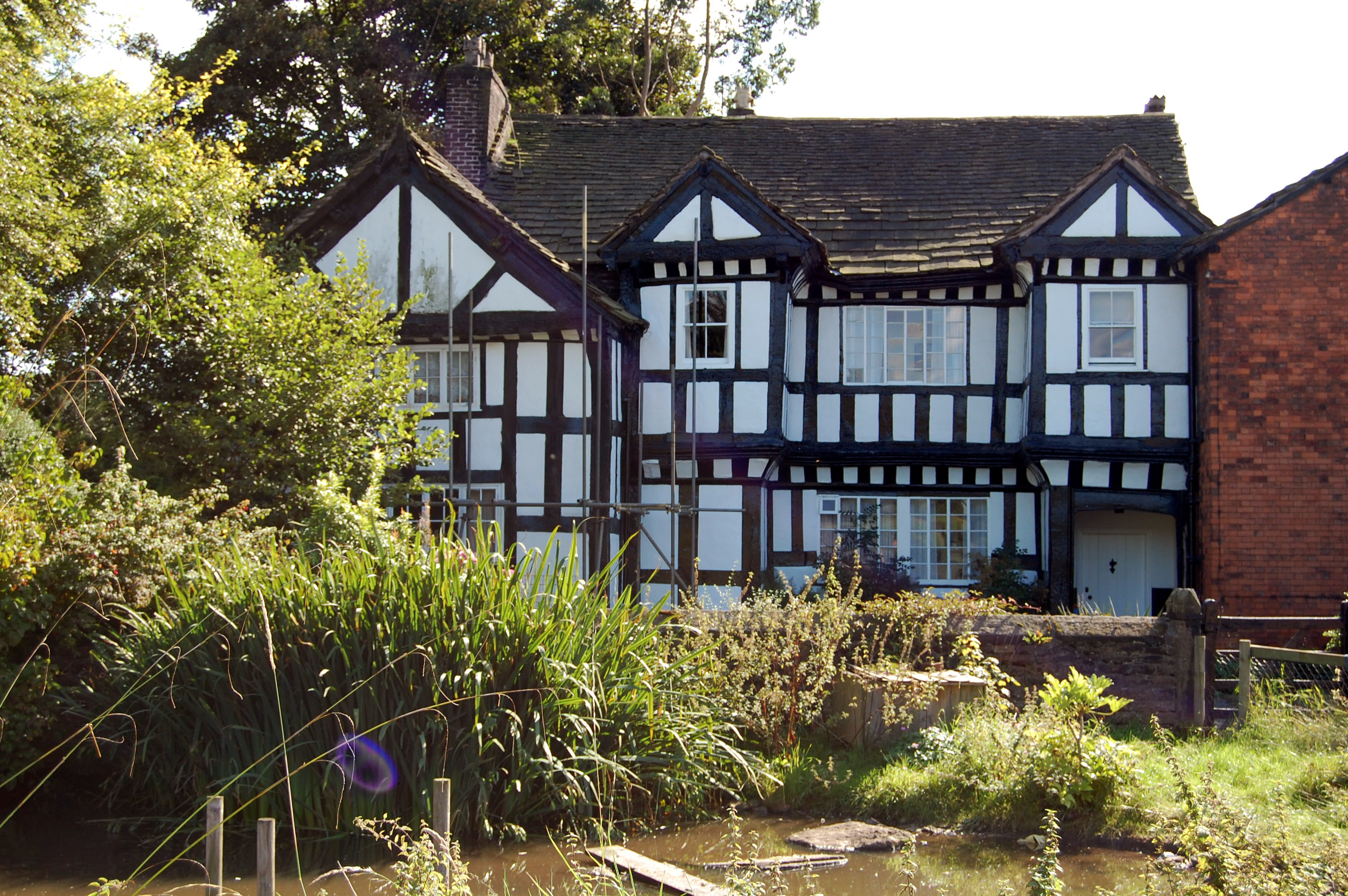
- Goyt Hall in 2009

- Location within Greater Manchester
- Population: 17,040 (Bredbury and Woodley built up area, 2021)
- OS grid reference: SJ925915
  - London: 157 miles (253 km) SSE
- Metropolitan borough: Stockport
- Metropolitan county: Greater Manchester
- Region: North West
- Country: England
- Sovereign state: United Kingdom
- Post town: STOCKPORT
- Postcode district: SK6
- Dialling code: 0161
- Police: Greater Manchester
- Fire: Greater Manchester
- Ambulance: North West
- UK Parliament: Hazel Grove

Bredbury is a town in the Metropolitan Borough of Stockport, Greater Manchester, England; it lies 8 miles (12.9 km) south-east of Manchester, 2 miles (3.2 km) east of Stockport and 3 miles (4.8 km) south-west of Hyde. The Bredbury and Woodley built up area (as defined by the Office for National Statistics) had a population of 17,040 at the 2021 census.

Bredbury is on the lower southern slopes of Werneth Low, an outlier of the Pennines; it lies between the valleys of the rivers Tame and Goyt, head-waters of the River Mersey.

== History ==
=== Iron Age ===
The area must have been unattractive to the Brigantes settlers in pre-Roman Britain, with its bleak hilltop, the heavy clay soil of the intermediate land probably covered by trees and becoming marshy where the slopes flattened out, and the swampy valley floors. The rivers flowed more fully before their waters were dammed in the 19th century to supply Manchester, Stockport and other towns. However, where the valley of the River Goyt narrows at New Bridge, passage was possible and here an ancient highway entered the village to proceed along the higher land to the north-east.

=== Roman occupation ===
The Romans surveyed and constructed a road between the forts of Mamucium (Manchester) and Ardotalia (Melandra Castle at Gamesley) over this ancient track; this, in turn, became an 18th-century turnpike road and the Liverpool to Skegness trunk road, the A560.

Some years ago, a Roman coin was dug up on the edge of the road between Bredbury railway station and St Mark's Church. The coin long antedates any Roman occupation of this part of the country; this may either have been lost when held as a souvenir or have been brought over from the continent in the course of trade.

As with the majority of hills, rivers and other natural features in this area, the names of the River Tame and Werneth Low are of Celtic origin. The name 'Bredbury' is Anglo-Saxon and probably dates from the first permanent settlement, likely a fortification. Names found in nearby villages suggest that Norse invaders found their way into the district, probably during the 10th century.

=== Middle Ages ===
Bredbury comprised farm land bought by Lord Danton in 1014. There is no mention of Lord Danton's manor, but the 'lord' of Bredbury was the pre-conquest Anglo-Saxon thane, Wulfric. It is likely that William the Conqueror's army, on its march from Yorkshire to subdue the rebellion at Chester, followed the main highway. Virtually all the townships on the way were systematically looted, part of the Harrying of the North. Bredbury seems to have been an exception, for reasons which are unclear, but the army apparently crossed the hill into Romiley, which although not on the direct route, is duly described as "waste" in the Domesday Book of 1086. Bredbury itself was mentioned briefly in the Domesday Book as being several hundred acres of land. The only occupants listed were a duck and a sheep. Its value was placed at three pounds.

Bredbury passed from the hands of Sir Richard de Vernon to the Mascis of Dunham, under whom it was held by the Fitz-Waltheofs of Stockport. A charter granted by the third Hamon de Masci, lord of Dunham, who died about the end of the reign of King John, confirms the ownership of lands in Bredbury to the Fitz-Waltheofs, and is of special interest because it affords an insight into the working of the feudal system of the period. A translation of the charter runs as follows:

And I, Hamo, regrant to Robert, the son of Waltheof, Bredbury and Brinnington, with their appurtenances, as his inheritance, to him and his heirs, to hold of me and my heirs, by the service of carrying my bed, my arms or my clothing, whenever the Earl of Chester in his own proper person shall go to Wales. And I, Hamo, will fully furnish Robert, the sone of Waltheof, and his heirs, with a sumpter beast and a man and a sack, and we will find estovers (sufficient food) whilst he is with us in the field, until he shall be returned, to the said Robert or his heirs. And Robert, the son of Waltheof, shall pay to ransom my body from captivity and detention, and to make my eldest son a knight, and to give my eldest daughter a marriage portion, in consideration of which Robert has given me a gold ring.

The conditions laid down in this charter were usual under the feudal system, when military expeditions into Wales were no uncommon tasks for the Earl of Chester and his underlords.

By a general inquisition of tenures, taken on 10 May 1288, to determine the services due to Edward I in the Welsh Wars, it was found that "Richard de Stokeport holds Bredbury of Hamo de Masci" and "makes service to our Lord the King with one uncaparisoned horse".

Some time during the 14th century, the manor of Bredbury was sub-divided into two portions. The larger was held by the Bredburys and was passed from them by marriage with an heiress to the Ardern family, who are the ancestors of William Shakespeare on his mother's side.

The remaining portion ultimately came into the possession of the Davenports of Henbury.

It would appear, however, that the manor of Bredbury was still held by the Stokeports. In the inquisition post mortem of Isabel, daughter and heiress of Sir Richard de Stokeport, taken in 1370, it was found that the manor of Bredbury, with its appurtenances, was held from Roger Lestrange, lord of Dunham Massey, by knight's service; it was worth 100 shillings per annum.

In the same year, another inquisition was taken on the death of Hugh de Davenport, which records that he died "seised of two parts of the manor of Bredbury, and of land in Romiley and Werneth" and that Thomas de Davenport was his son and heir, aged 12 years. These lands remained in the possession of the Davenports for several generations The manor house of the Davenports in Bredbury was Goyt Hall on the banks of the River Goyt.

During the Middle Ages, the wealth of the Kingdom of England arose largely from the export of wool to the Netherlands, but the district had no share in this prosperity. By Tudor times, however, conditions had changed. Continental trade had been ruined by the Dutch War of Independence and home production of cloth was encouraged. By this time too, the wolves of Longdendale had been exterminated. Great flocks of sheep grazed on the moors and hillsides of the district, sheep farmers and weavers prospered, and established families such as the Ardernes and, at nearby Marple, the Bradshaws became wealthy and influential. The local industries based on thesheep farming, in the absence of ready water power, remained domestic – mainly handloom weaving and the making of felt hats.

=== Modern era ===
A schedule of owners of lands in the township shows that two lords of the manor in 1661 were Sir Fulke Lucy of Henbury and John Arderne of Bredbury, and that in 1672 Sir John Arderne owned Arden Hall, whilst Sir Fulke Lucy owned Goyt Hall. Shortly after this date the Davenports' portion of the manor of Bredbury appears to have been purchased by Sir John Arderne of Arden Hall, who thus acquired the whole manor.

Until the beginning of the 19th century, a Court Baron was held for the lordship under the title of the Court of the Manor of Bredbury-cum-Goyt.

The main road continued to be of importance, particularly for the transport of salt from Cheshire, throughout medieval times. In the 17th century there were as many as twelve smithies in Bredbury. Since one blacksmith usually satisfied the needs of any one township, it would appear that so many craftsmen were needed to shoe the packhorses which moved in long processions through the village.

In 1754, the population of Bredbury is recorded as being 597. The district was, until quite late in the 19th century, little more than a group of hamlets, including Barrack Hill, Harrytown and Hatherlow. The Industrial Revolution brought a number of cotton mills, some of which depended on the water power provided by the head-streams of the River Mersey and the Peak Forest Canal, along which more mills were built.

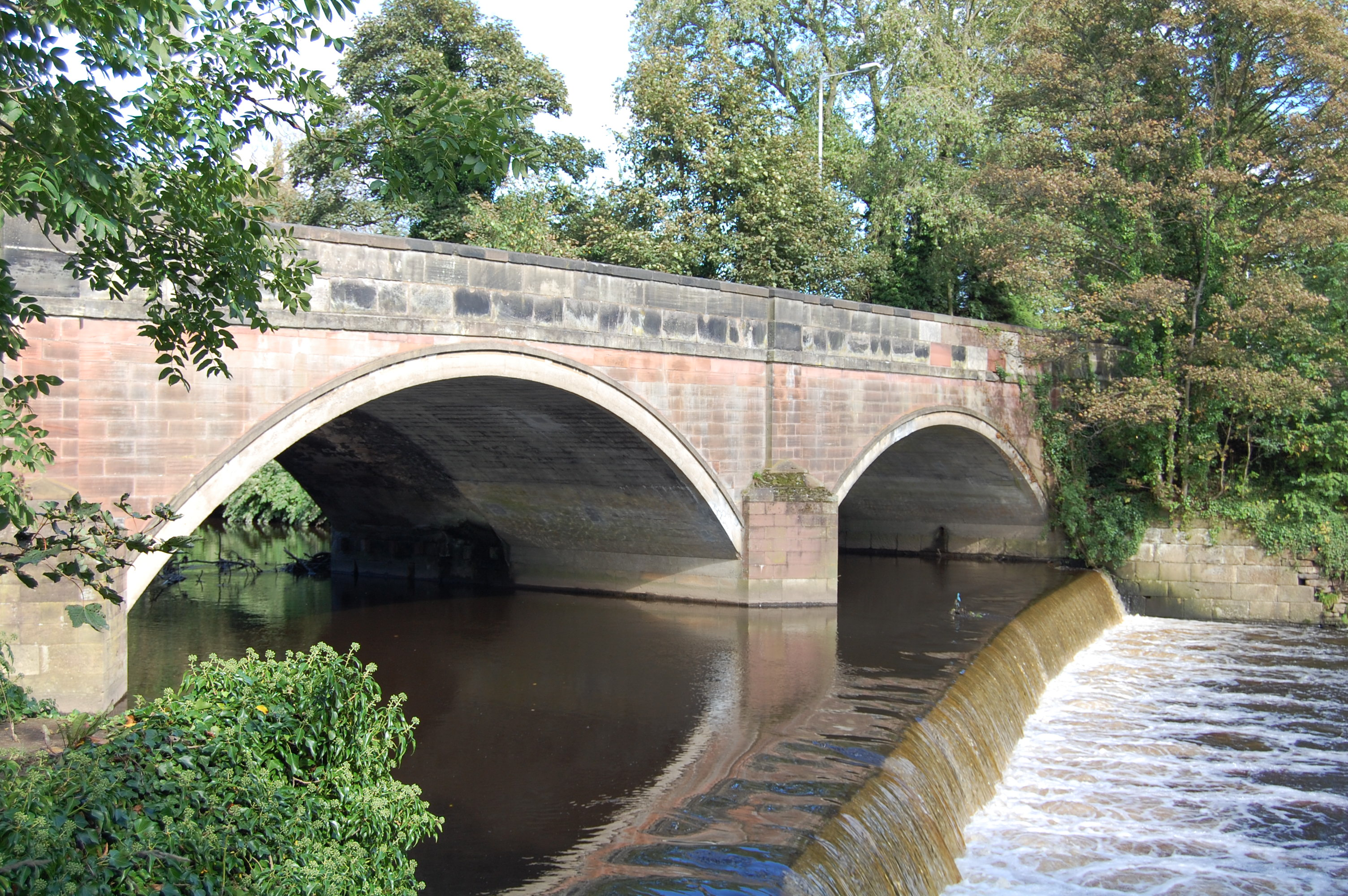
The weir at Otterspool was intended to provide water power for an industrial estate along the banks of the River Goyt.

The days of the great local landowners ended in the early 19th century. William Arden, 2nd Lord Alvanley, succeeded to the Arden estates on the death of his uncle, John Arden, in July 1823. He was a bachelor who had spent his life in the circle of the Prince Regent, building up heavy debts in expectation of his inheritance. Within a month of getting the estates, he had sold Underbank Hall in Stockport and most of the Bredbury lands were sold in lots in 1825, realising in three days nearly £154,000. There was a final sale, including the mansion of Arden Hall in 1833. William Arden was succeeded by his brother Richard Arden, on whose death in 1857 the barony became extinct. The long connection of the Arden family had been broken, and for the next century most of the old manor lands were held by a small number of families, including the Horsfields, Hudsons and Vaudreys, until it became profitable to sell to building developers.

At the sale of the Bredbury estate, an area lying along the River Goyt was purchased by a Mr Marsden, who built a weir at Otterspool and planned to use water power to develop the valley from there to New Bridge as an industrial estate. However, he failed to secure the water rights. and by the time the lengthy legal proceedings were completed water power had been superseded by steam power.

=== Industrial Revolution ===
Population (including Woodley)
Year	Population
1754	597
1851	2,990
1881	3,733
1911	5,876
1931	7,154
1951	12,020
1961	13,921
1966	17,700

The construction of the Peak Forest Canal by Samuel Oldknow, under the direction of Benjamin Outram, opened in sections in the 1790s and first decade of the 19th century, had a striking effect on the village. On the one hand, it provided a water supply and the transport of raw materials, fuel and finished products for the new mills. On the other hand, it made possible the importing of lime from Derbyshire for agricultural improvement. The green fields and rich crops of the local farms were remarked upon by visitors and, with easy transport to the growing markets of Manchester and Stockport, local agriculture was prosperous in the period following the Napoleonic Wars when elsewhere in the country there was rural depression.

The coming of the railways led to further industrial development, a steady growth of population and the fusing of the separate settlements into the village of Bredbury. The first line was the Manchester, Sheffield and Lincolnshire Railway branch from Hyde Junction, which was opened to Hyde in 1858 and extended to Marple on 5 August 1862. The Stockport and Woodley Junction line, opened on 12 January 1863, was amalgamated into the Cheshire Lines Committee on 5 July 1865. The lines from Romiley Junction to Bredbury Junction and Ashburys were opened on 1 April 1875 and 2 August 1875 respectively; on the latter date, the branch from Brinnington to Reddish Junction was opened. On 1 February 1867, Midland Railway trains began to run through the village, as part of the Sheffield and Midland Railway Companies' Committee, to Manchester London Road, at first via Hyde and later via Reddish. The terminus was transferred to Manchester Central in 1880, trains running via Stockport Tiviot Dale.

There are now few traces of the coal mining that went back to the 17th century until the early 20th century; it was one of the bases of life in the village. The last colliery closed in 1926 and spoil heaps were levelled at Ashton Road and Stockport Road East in the 1960s to make way for new industrial development. Brick-making too was carried on in the village, with Jacksons Brickworks at Ashton Road surviving into the 1970s; there were several large hat works, the last of which closed in 1958.

Exors of James Mills were manufacturers of steel products for over 100 years, the company growing from a small building employing two men to the large Bredbury Steelworks on Lower Bents Lane, which at its height employed over 2,000 people. In the early part of the 20th century, the company began to roll steel and to produce bright steel, at one point becoming the largest producer of bright steel outside the United States. Other products were added from time to time, including cotters for locomotives and rolling stock, engineers' keys, taper pins, grooved fastenings for securing all kinds of assemblies, railway permanent way fastenings, rail lubricators and hot pressings of various types. In 1938, the company introduced lead-bearing steels to the United Kingdom and, in the 1960s, developed free machining steels containing tellurium and an alloy replacement steel. The company was later acquired by GKN and closed down in 1985. The site has since been redeveloped for housing.

The firm of Lightbown Aspinall started making wallpaper in Pendleton and, in 1899, became part of the newly formed Wall Paper Manufacturers. In 1929, the plant was transferred to Brookfield Avenue, where the company produced Crown and Scene wallpapers and Crown Vinyl wall covering, employing 450 people. The site has since been redeveloped for housing.

Pear New Mill was owned by Combined English Mills and were spinners of superfine white hosiery yarn, employing over 400 people. The building has since been subdivided into industrial units.

William Crosland, an engineer and ironfounder, started business in 1855 in an upstairs room at Miller Street in Manchester. He was later joined by his four sons and the company moved to Stockport Road West in 1894, manufacturing machines and cutting tools for the packaging industry and specialised tooling for the sheet metal trade. The site has since been redeveloped as an industrial estate.

=== 20th century ===
In the 1930s, and after the Second World War, the growth rate accelerated with the coming of new industries, including engineering, chemicals, clothing and textiles, whilst the village became an important residential area on the periphery of the Greater Manchester Urban Area. A large bakery was erected on Ashton Road in 1951.

Comprehensive sewerage and sewage disposal services were completed and put into operation in 1938.

In 1948, the tramway along the A560 from Stockport to Hyde and beyond was abandoned after less than 50 years use. The section through Bredbury had been opened in August 1901.

After considerable pressure by the Government and the Mersey River Board, the Urban District Council agreed in 1966 to a joint scheme with the County Borough of Stockport, abandoning the treatment works at Welkin Road and the sludge beds at Brinnington, to provide for the rapidly growing population and the additional industry.

== Governance ==
There is one main tier of local government covering Bredbury, at metropolitan borough level by Stockport Metropolitan Borough Council. The council is a member of the Greater Manchester Combined Authority, which is led by the directly-elected Mayor of Greater Manchester.

=== Administrative history ===
Bredbury was historically a township in the ancient parish of Stockport, which formed part of the Macclesfield Hundred of Cheshire. From the 17th century onwards, parishes were gradually given various civil functions under the poor laws, in addition to their original ecclesiastical functions. In some cases, including Stockport, the civil functions were exercised by each township separately rather than the parish as a whole. In 1866, the legal definition of 'parish' was changed to be the areas used for administering the poor laws, and so Bredbury became a civil parish. The Bredbury township was made a separate ecclesiastical parish from Stockport in 1846. St Mark's Church was subsequently built to serve as Bredbury's parish church, being completed in 1848.

In 1865, a local government district was created covering the township of Bredbury, administered by an elected local board. The district was enlarged in 1880 to take in the neighbouring township of Romiley, and the district was renamed Bredbury and Romiley. Local government districts were reconstituted as urban districts under the Local Government Act 1894.

Bredbury continued to form a civil parish, within the Bredbury and Romiley Urban District after 1894 but, as an urban parish, it had no parish council. The parishes within the urban district were united into a single parish called Bredbury and Romiley in 1936, when the district was also enlarged to take in Compstall. In 1931 (the last census before its abolition) Bredbury parish had a population of 7,154.

Bredbury and Romiley Urban District was abolished in 1974, under the Local Government Act 1972. The area became part of the Metropolitan Borough of Stockport in Greater Manchester.

== Landmarks ==
The village has extensive areas of attractive countryside, both in the river valleys and on the slopes of Werneth Low.

=== Arden Hall ===
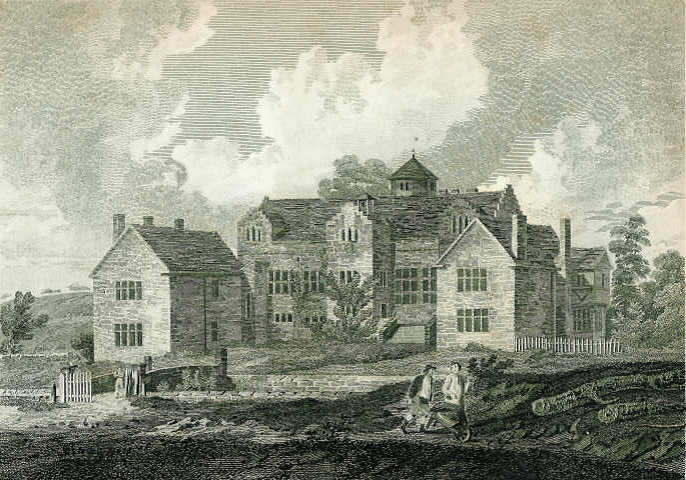
Arden Hall (Aiken, 1795)

The most famous of the halls of Bredbury, Arden Hall, was erected in 1597, is now a ruin standing in a commanding position above the valley of the River Tame. For over two centuries, it was owned by the Ardernes, who had other possessions in Cheshire and were a junior branch of the Arden family of Warwickshire, of whom William Shakespeare's mother was a member.

The building was at one time "a tall building, narrow in proportion to its height and length, built of flat stones or parpoints, and having a sturdy watchtower at the back, looking over the valley of the River Tame. It was surrounded by a wide and deep moat. On the front were three gables, two of them projecting from the face of the hall, the third being flush with it. The entrance doorway was in the side of the central gable, and was approached from the courtyard by a flight of steps. Passing through the doorway, a heavy oak door on the right side opened at once into the Great Hall, and in the tower exactly opposite was a wide oak staircase, which led to the upper part of the house. The Great Hall occupied the whole of the ground floor of this portion of the building, and was about 33 feet (10 m) long by 24 feet (7.3 m) wide. At the end was a raised platform, where the high table was situated, lighted by two loft bay windows, one at each end. The year in which some portion of the hall, if indeed not the whole of it, was erected, is fixed from the date 1597 on the spout above the entrance, and the initials and date R A 1597 on the right hand gable."

In the particulars of sale of 1825, it states that "the ancient mansion house of Arden Hall has been in part converted into a commodious farm house, with every requisite convenience", and it had already been let as such.

There is a tradition that Oliver Cromwell stayed at the hall and that there was a skirmish nearby between Cavaliers and Roundheads, but there is no firm evidence, although the access to the hall is called Battle Lane. However, Ralph Arderne, like most other local gentry, espoused the Parliamentarian cause and saw action in several engagements.

=== Bredbury Hall ===
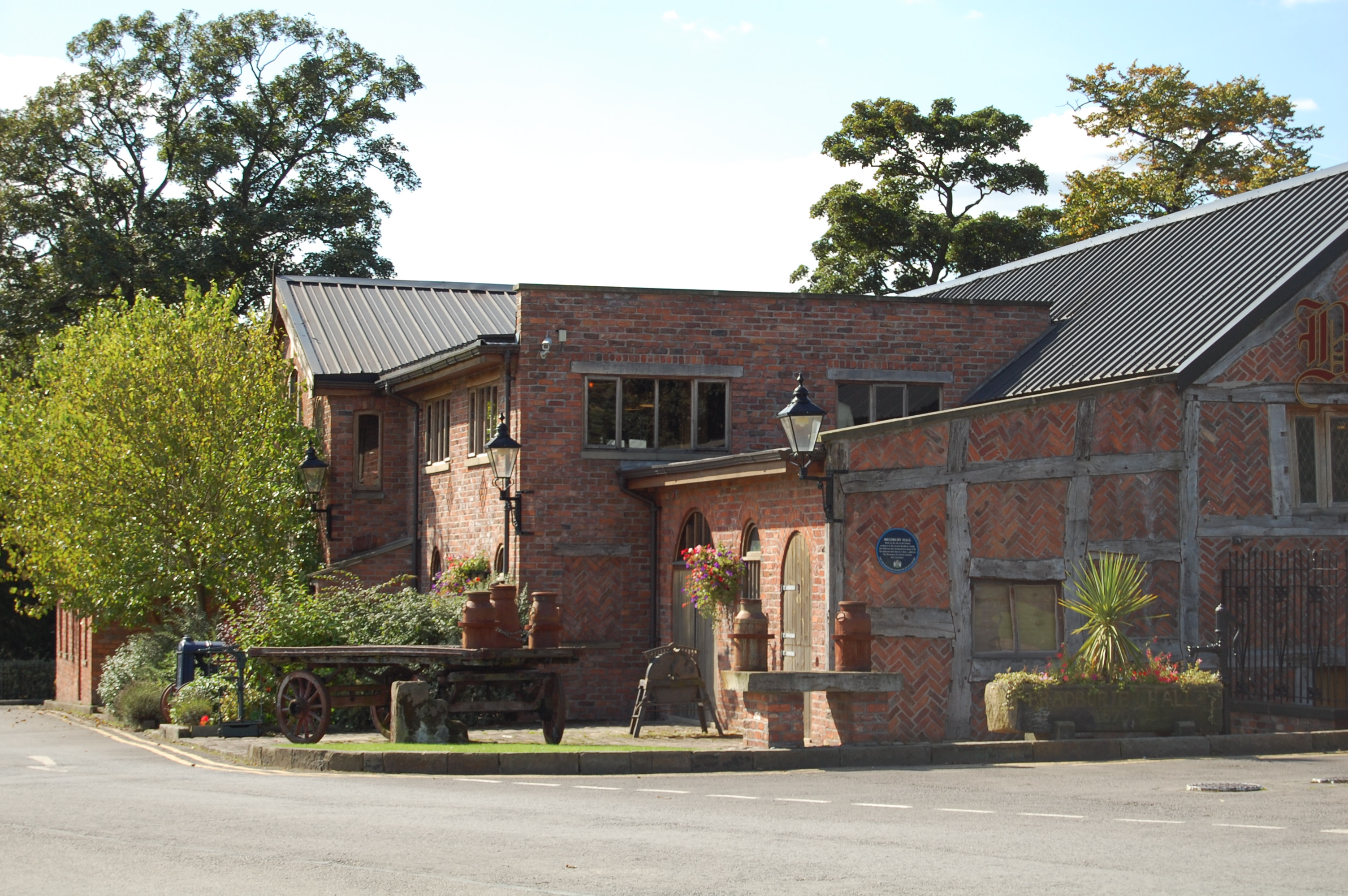
The great barn of Bredbury Hall, of cruck framed construction, is medieval in origin although the original framing timbers have been overlaid by brick

Bredbury Hall, approached from Dark Lane, has been so altered as to have lost every vestige of its former appearance. It was probably built upon the site of a former homestead, as some branch of the Bredburys is supposed to have settled here in early times.

In 1638, the hall was occupied by a branch of the Davenports, a connection of the Bredburys. In later times, the venerable building degenerated into an ordinary farmstead.

In the 19th century, it was rebuilt and converted into a family residence in the Georgian style.

For some years prior to the erection of St Barnabas Church, services were held here. The hall, outbuildings and grounds are now used as a hotel and country club; the buildings have been much modified to suit that purpose.

The great barn, 42 yards (38 m) long of cruck framed construction, is medieval in origin although the original framing timbers have been overlaid by brick.

The hotel was owned for several years by the Flood family; it has been owned and operated by Vine Hotels since May 2021 and after some bedroom renovations will rebrand as a Mercure property.

The great barn is now renovated into an events space and hosts regular club nights. It has several bars and a large dance floor.

Bredbury Hall is now known as a popular hotel and many of its stories are now lost or just unknown. It is said that the ghosts of the old manor, that stood here previously, still roam the hallways at night; there have been many sightings and hearings reported of this. Later, on further investigation, no proof of such sighting was found and now considered a hoax.

=== Bredbury Library ===
The original library on George Lane opened in 1937; the capacity was doubled by extensions in 1962, comprising a children's room and reference room. The latter, now used as a community meeting room, is a dodecahedral annexe, erected mainly out of funds collected locally, as a War Memorial for the Second World War, and contains memorial windows designed by Anne Goodrich, a local artist, and a Book of Remembrance for the dead in both World Wars. Further substantial extensions and alterations, including the conversion of the War Memorial room into an exhibition and lecture room, were completed in 1970.

In 1950, the Centenary Year of the Public Library Movement, plaques were unveiled at the library in honour of Sir Ernest Barker, the Woodley-born writer on political and historic subjects, and Thomas Greenwood, the Woodley-born writer and advocate of free public libraries.

=== Bredbury Old School ===
Erected at School Brow in 1780 by John Arden, Lord of the Manor, and the freeholders of the township of Bredbury, on land enclosed from the Common of Barrack Hill, Bredbury Old School was vested in trustees who were to "appoint a proper and sufficient person to be Schoolmaster". The appointee was to enter into a bond with the trustees "in the penal sum of £200 at the least conditioned for the due observance of the several rules and conditions" set out in the trust deed, including that he "shall duly and properly teach and instruct children to read, write and cast accompts and that his wife or some sufficient person to be by him provided shall teach girls to knit and sew."

The building of larger schools and the passing of the Education Acts rendered the building obsolete. By an order of the Charity Commissioners in 1889, the trustees were instructed to "apply the trust income either in making payments by way of rewards or prizes to children attending public elementary schools in the townships of Bredbury and Romiley for good conduct, regularity in attendance and proficiency during a period of three years next preceding the award, or in the payment of exhibitions tenable at places of higher education." Later changes to the grant system made the second power ineffectual, but awards of cash continue to be made to local schoolchildren a few days before Christmas, together with a traditional form of certificate.

The building has, since its closing as a school, been used for a variety of purposes, including use as offices of Bredbury and Romiley Urban District Council. By the 1950s, it had fallen into serious disrepair. Its re-roofing with asbestos cement sheets and the rendering of the walls modified the external appearance very seriously, but inside the original floors and timbers were still visible. After the repairs it was leased to Romiley Little Theatre as their club house, and the surrounding land was let as allotments.

=== Goyt Hall ===
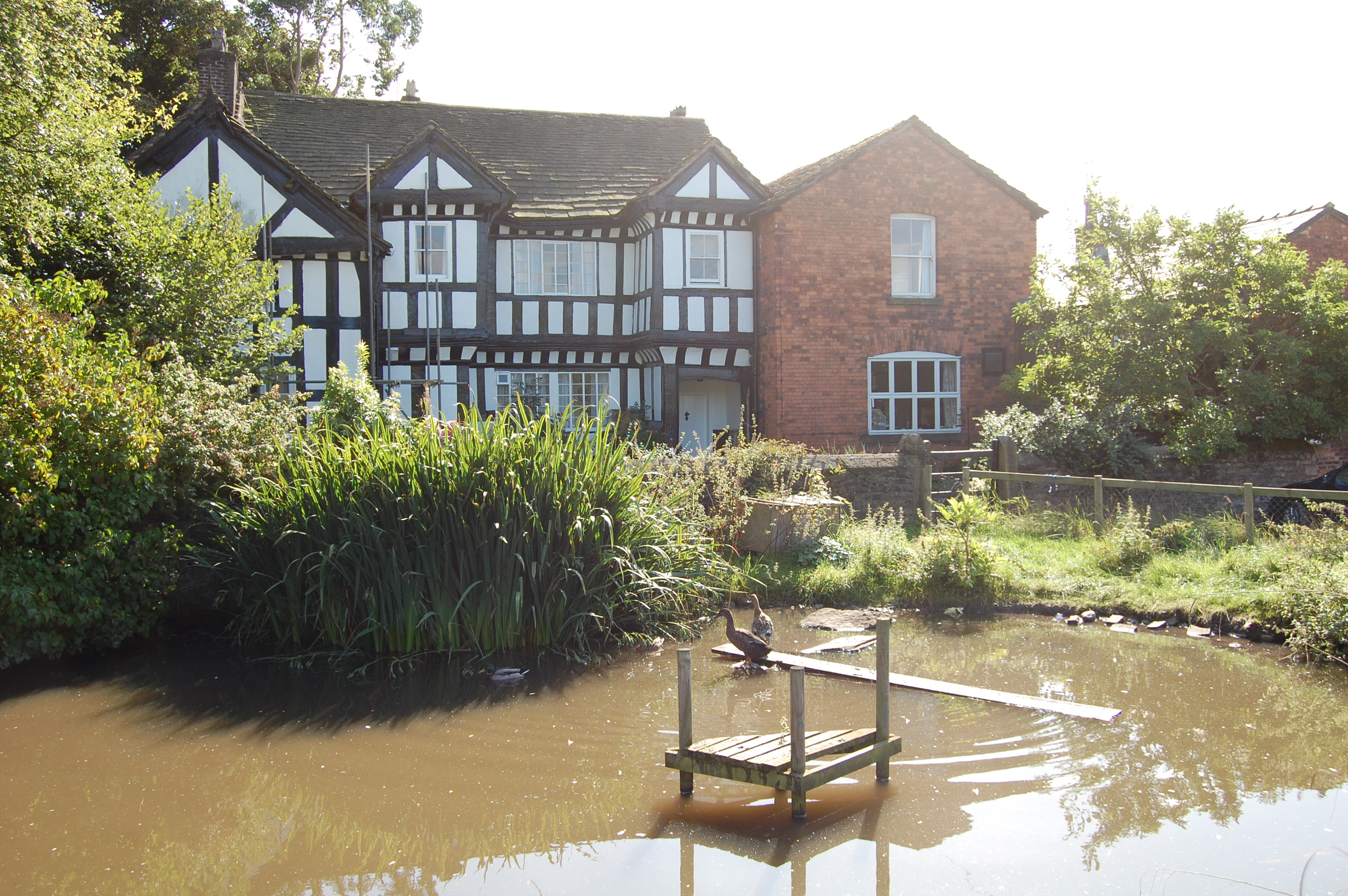
The marriage of the last of the Davenports in 1664 brought Goyt Hall into the possession of Sir Fulke Lucy.

Goyt Hall, which stands in the valley of the River Goyt, midway between Otterspool Bridge and New Bridge, is a half-timbered building erected by Randal Davenport about the year 1570, although William Davenport of Goyt Hall, who appears as witnessing a mortgage, died in 1542.

The marriage of the last of the Davenports in 1664 brought the hall into the possession of Sir Fulke Lucy, a kinsman of Sir Thomas Lucy who features in the story of William Shakespeare's youth. This rather tenuous association was marked by the naming of the streets on the nearby Shakespeare Estate, an overspill development built by Manchester City Council.

=== Harrytown Hall ===
Formerly occupied by the Convent of the Nativity of the Sisters of Charity of Notre Dame d'Évron, who maintained Harrytown High School, Harrytown Hall dates from 1671 and is well preserved in spite of being Gothicised during the Romantic Revival. The building was converted into apartments in the early 1980s.

== Transport ==
=== Railway ===
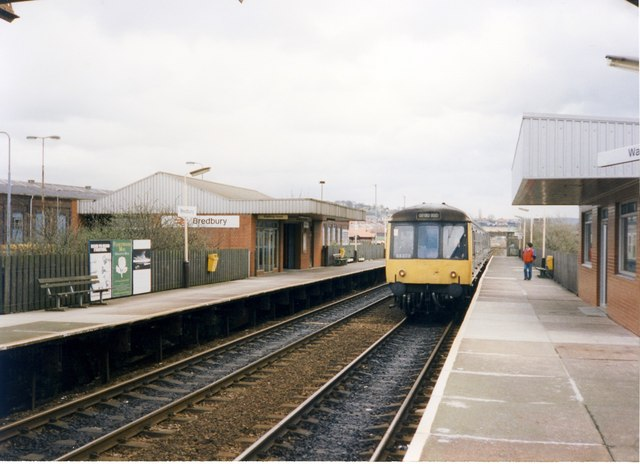
Bredbury station, 1989

Bredbury is served by Bredbury railway station on the Hope Valley Line between Sheffield, New Mills Central and Manchester Piccadilly. Services are generally half-hourly on Mondays to Saturdays, hourly on Sundays.

=== Buses ===
Buses link the town with the neighbouring communities of Ashton-under-Lyne, Brinnington, Compstall, Denton, Dukinfield, Hyde, Marple, Marple Bridge, Romiley, Woodley and Stockport.

Services are operated by Stagecoach Manchester; key routes that serve Bredbury include:

- 330 runs between Stockport and Ashton, via Woodley, Hyde and Dukinfield.
- 382 runs between Stockport and Woodley, via Romiley.
- There are regular services on a circular route to and from Stockport town centre: the 383 travels anticlockwise to Lower Bredbury and Portwood; and the 384 clockwise to Harrytown, Romiley, Compstall, Marple and Offerton.

=== Roads ===
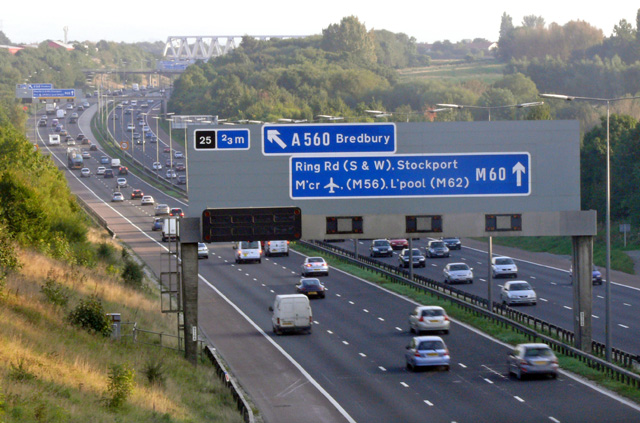
The M60 motorway approaching Bredbury

Bredbury is situated close to J25 of the M60 Manchester orbital motorway. The A560 passes through the suburb, which runs between Altrincham, Stockport, Gee Cross and Hattersley.

== Education ==
Bredbury has a public library and two secondary schools: Harrytown Catholic High School and Werneth School; the latter was formerly known as Bredbury Comprehensive.

Bredbury was formerly home to the National Library for the Blind. In November 2012, NLB's Bredbury site was closed and its braille, giant print, Moon books and braille sheet music collections were relocated to the RNIB's Peterborough site.

== Religious sites ==
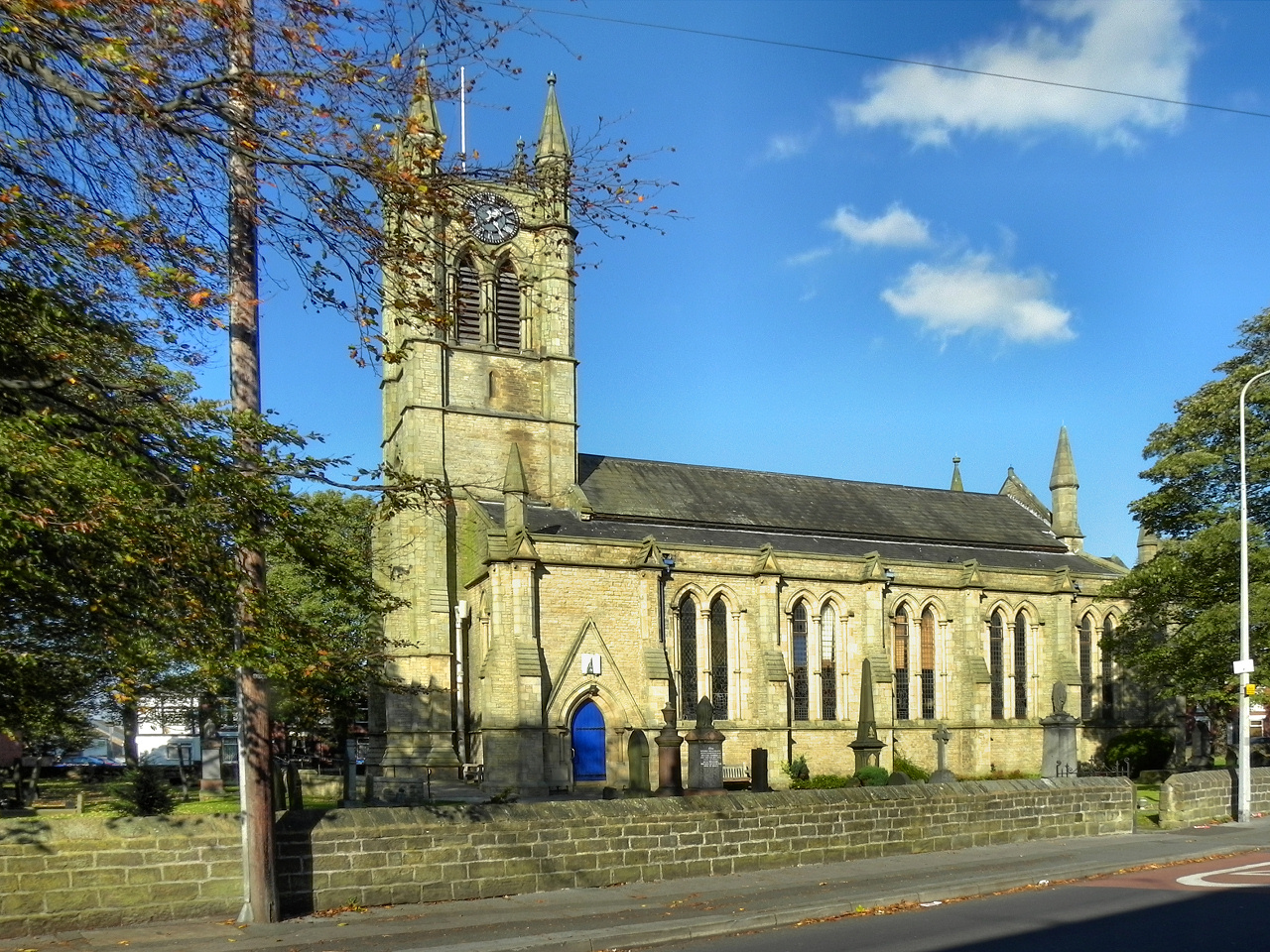
St Mark's Church, Bredbury

St Mark (Church of England) The parish church of Bredbury is dedicated to St Mark.

Although the town is mentioned in the Domesday Book, Bredbury was without a church until the middle of the 19th century. The first move towards the establishment of a local church and parish, as distinct from that of St Mary's in Stockport, was made in 1846, when an Order in Council marked out the boundaries of the District of St Mark, Bredbury.

It was not long before a site for the church was secured through the generosity of John Sidebotham of Kingston in Hyde and, in 1847, the foundation stone of the new church was laid by the donor of the site. The church was consecrated on 17 January 1849 and the church school was opened in 1850.

Built of freestone in the Early English style, the church consists of a square tower having four pinnacles, a nave and aisles, and a chancel with a vestry on the north side. The tower is 70 feet (21 m) high, occupying a commanding position, a contains a clock and a peal of bells. The windows consist of two lights each, the chancel window of three lights being filled with painted glass illustrating the Crucifixion, erected by William Collier Vaudrey in 1875, to the memory of his wife and her sister.

The Church School, now rebuilt, is on the opposite side of Redhouse Lane.

St Barnabas (Church of England) In 1942, Bredbury Hall, with its 11 acres (4.5 ha) of land, was purchased by the Diocese of Chester to be used as a mission church and social centre for Lower Bredbury. On 16 May 1943, the Lord Bishop of Chester dedicated an altar in one of the rooms of the hall.

Later, the new church was erected nearby and was dedicated to St Barnabas by the Bishop of Chester on 27 March 1954. Bredbury Hall was then sold.

Our Lady and St Christopher (Roman Catholic) The Roman Catholic faith is ministered to by the Church of Our Lady and St Christopher at Barrack Hill, which was erected in 1932. A presbytery was added in 1952; the church was subsequently enlarged and a parish hall added. Roman Catholic services were previously held in the chapel at Harrytown Hall.

Hatherlow (United Reformed Church)

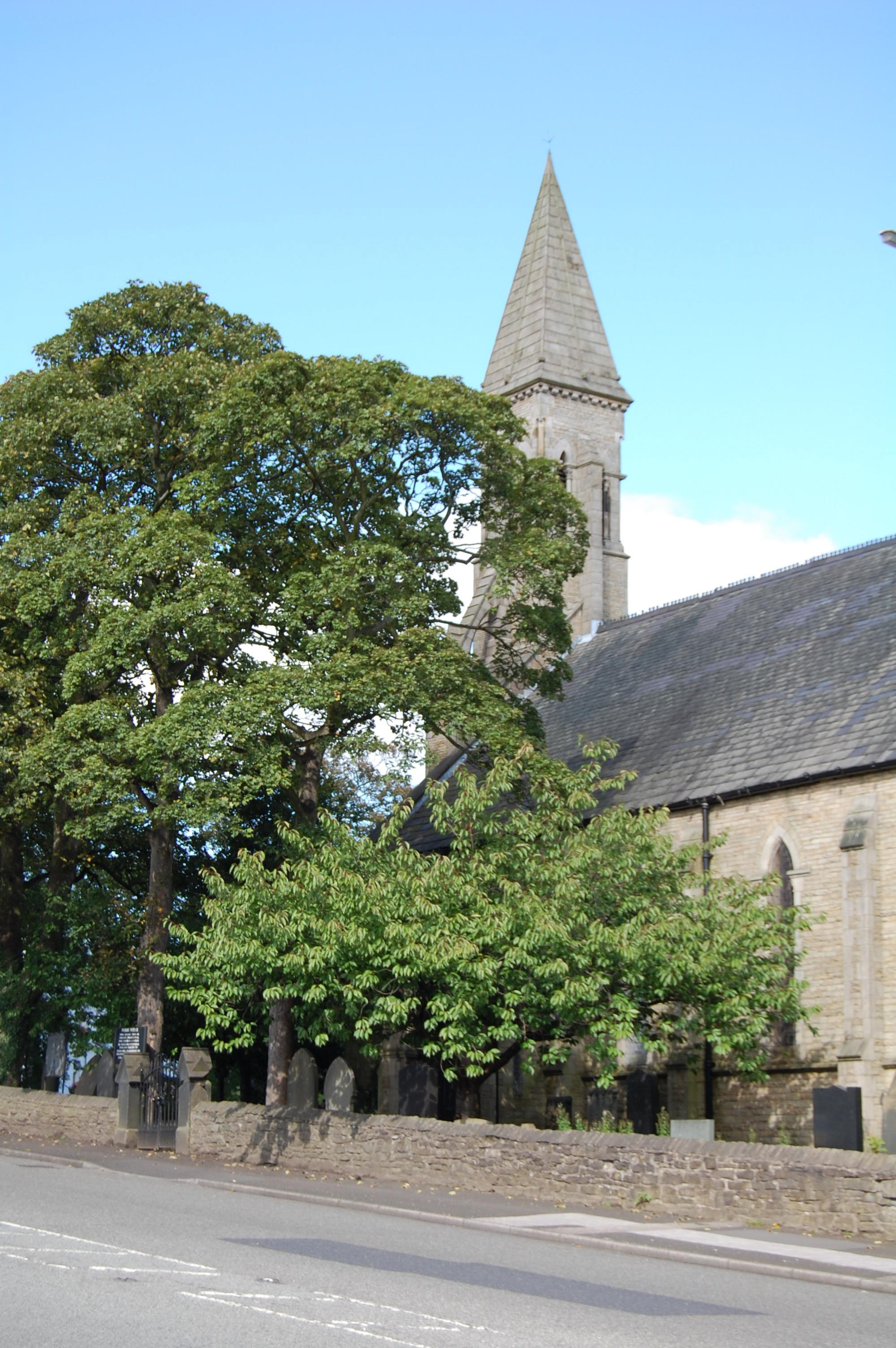
Hatherlow Congregational Church opened in 1845, although the burial ground surrounding it dates back to 1793

Hatherlow Church traces its history back to 1645, services then being held in Chadkirk Chapel, and it was the oldest Congregational body in Cheshire. The first independent minister at Chadkirk was Gamallel Jones, who settled there in 1688 or 1689. In the latter year, the "Meeting Place" at Chadkirk was certified as a licensed place for religious worship shortly after the passing of the Toleration Act. When they were finally ejected in the reign of Queen Anne, a new building was erected in 1706 on the site now occupied by Hatherlow Sunday School.

It is recorded in a statistical table of the dissenting chapels in Cheshire, begun about 1715, that the congregation at Hatherlow numbered about 300 hearers, including 10 gentlemen, 39 tradesmen, 26 yeomen and 8 labourers. These would be drawn from a very wide area.

The present church was opened as Hatherlow Congregational Church in 1845, although the burial ground surrounding it goes back to 1793. A day school was established in 1780 at Bredbury Old School on School Brow and the building known as Top School on Gorsey Brow, now partially demolished, was built in 1830 as an overflow. The day school continued until it was succeeded by the Council school at Barrack Hill in 1909.

Hatherlow Sunday School was established in May 1817; it was first held at School Brow and then at the Top School. The present Sunday School was built in 1911.

The church has always been the centre of cultural activity in the district; it was the home of the former Bredbury Amicable Subscription Library, founded in 1822, and later of Hatherlow Botanical Society.

== Notable people ==
- Robert Robinson (1726–1791), English Dissenter, influential Baptist and scholar.
- Richard Pepper Arden, 1st Baron Alvanley (1744–1804), Solicitor General, Attorney General and politician.
- Charles Clay (1801–1893), surgeon; the Father of Ovariotomy.
- Mike Yarwood (1941–2023), impressionist, comedian and actor
- Peter Snape (born 1942), politician, MP for West Bromwich East 1974-2001
- Joanne Whalley (born 1961), film and television actress, went to school locally
- Will Mellor (born 1976), actor who plays Harvey Gaskell on Coronation Street
- Danny Miller (born 1991), actor who plays Aaron Dingle on Emmerdale

John Agecroft (1716–1804) lived in a cottage at Barrack Hill where, until the end of the 19th century, a crude bust stood in a niche on the outer wall. A canvass weaver, bookbinder and well-known local eccentric, he is said to have conceived the idea of the bust from that of William Shakespeare at Stratford upon Avon, and to have made the matrix by pushing his face into the hardening mud of a ditch. The bust, or part of it, in the form of a death mask, was on display in the Council Chamber when Agecroft Road was named.

Edward McLellan (1870–1967) was born in Redhouse Lane. The son of the village clogger, he attended St Mark's School. It speaks much for the quality of education there, under the headmaster Silas Whipp, that without further formal education he was able to enter Hartley College, the Primitive Methodist Ministers' Training college, from which he embarked on 47 years of active ministry. In 1931, he reached the highest point he could attain in his vocation when he was elected president of the Primitive Methodist Conference. He published many articles and stories in magazines and wrote a number of books on religious subjects. He continued to preach to an advanced age and conducted services after his 90th year at both Woodley and Greave.

Thomas Platt (1745–1824) of Dark Lane House was claimed to have established a Sunday school some years before Robert Raikes, the usually accredited founder of the system. In recruiting for Stockport Parish Church choir, he found that many of the boys and girls he gathered could not read, and so instructed them on Sunday evenings. When Raikes' system spread to Greater Manchester, Platt became the paid headmaster of one of the Stockport Sunday Schools.

== See also ==
- Listed buildings in Bredbury and Romiley
