= Chadkirk Chapel =

Listed building in Greater Manchester, England

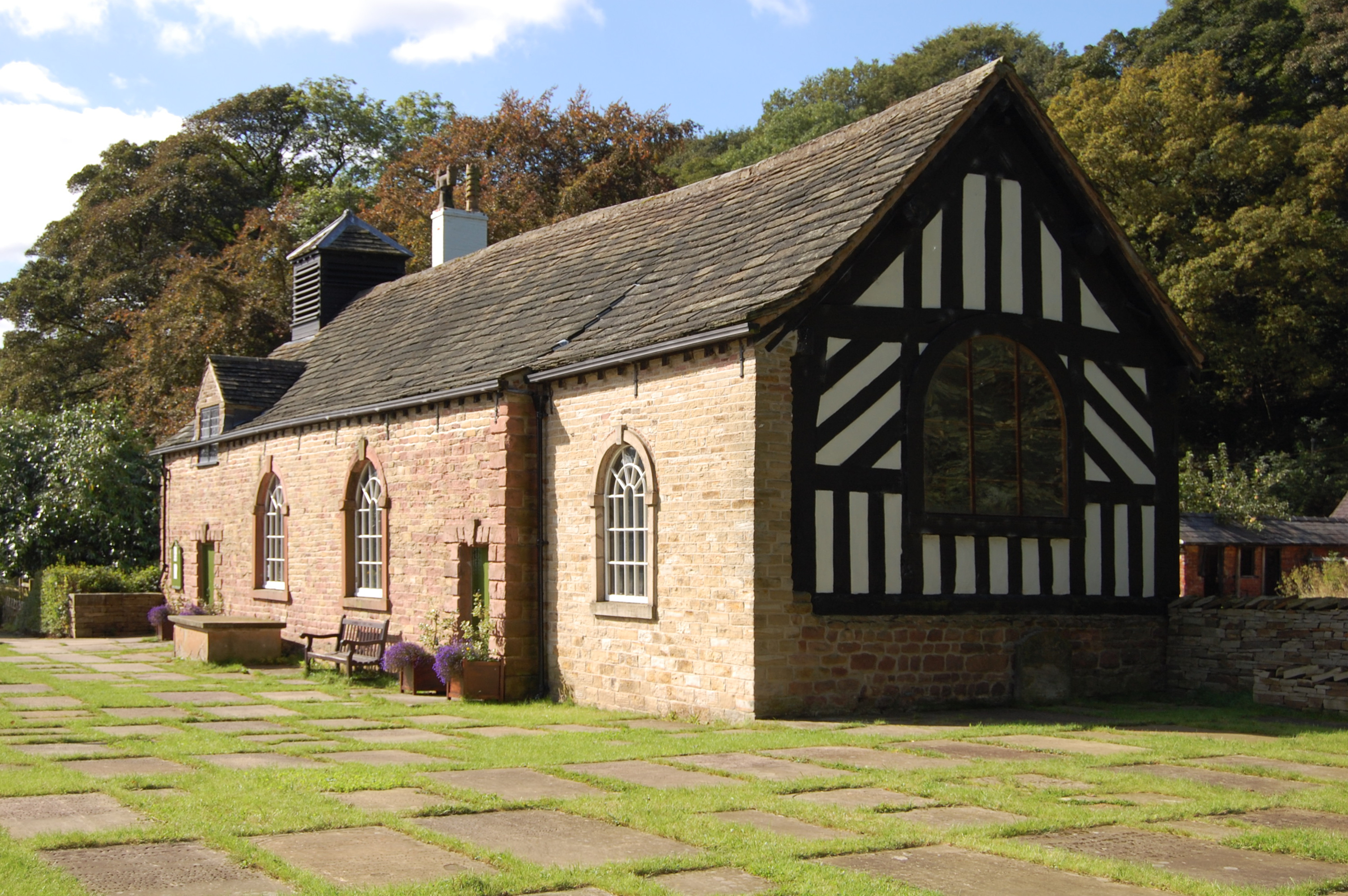
- The chapel in 2009

- Location in Greater Manchester

General information
- Status: Wedding venue and events space
- Type: Chapel (former)
- Location: Chadkirk Lane, near Romiley, Greater Manchester, England
- Coordinates: 53.40877°N 2.09162°W
- Grid position: SJ 940 903
- Years built: 16th century 1747 (south walls rebuilt)
- Renovated: 1876 and 1995 (restored)
- Owner: Stockport Council

Design and construction
- Designations

Listed Building – Grade II*
- Official name: Chadkirk Chapel
- Designated: 29 March 1966
- Reference no.: 1259981

Website
- chadkirkchapel.org

Chadkirk Chapel is a Grade II* listed former chapel on Chadkirk Lane in Chadkirk, near Romiley, within the Metropolitan Borough of Stockport, Greater Manchester, England. Parts of the building date from the 16th century, though worship on the site is thought to be older, and the chapel has undergone periods of neglect, rebuilding and restoration. Declared redundant in 1971, it is now owned by Stockport Council and used for weddings and community events.

== History ==
There are records of a chaplain at or possibly from Chadkirk in 1347; however, the fact that the name incorporates the word "kirk", deriving from the Scandinavian word for a church or chapel, points to even earlier worship here, at a time when Scandinavian influence on the local dialects of English was strong enough for "kirk" to be a usual word for a house of worship.

The earliest part of the present structure is the half-timbered east end dating back, very probably, to the 16th century, the time of the Tudor kings and queens and of the Reformation, the break between the English Church and the Church of Rome.

In time, however, the chapel fell into disuse and decay. It passed through a succession of owners and is even reputed to have been used as a stable. Subsequently, it was used by Nonconformists, but they were ejected during the reign of Queen Anne and erected a new chapel at Hatherlow at the top of the hill overlooking Chadkirk. The chapel once again fell into neglect and was "in a ruinous condition" until in 1747 it was taken over once more by the Church of England and was substantially rebuilt in stone.

Further repairs were carried out at Chadkirk in 1761 and 1860. In 1876 there was a restoration when much of the furniture was removed. The chapel was declared redundant in 1971, deconsecrated and then purchased by Bredbury and Romiley Urban District Council. In 1974 local government reorganisation abolished urban districts and the area was transferred to the newly created Stockport Metropolitan Borough Council.

The chapel was restored in 1995 and is used as a wedding venue by Stockport Council and for community events, meetings and activities managed by a non-profit community organisation, the Friends of Chadkirk. The Friends group helps to maintain and run the chapel and surrounding estate.

== Architecture ==
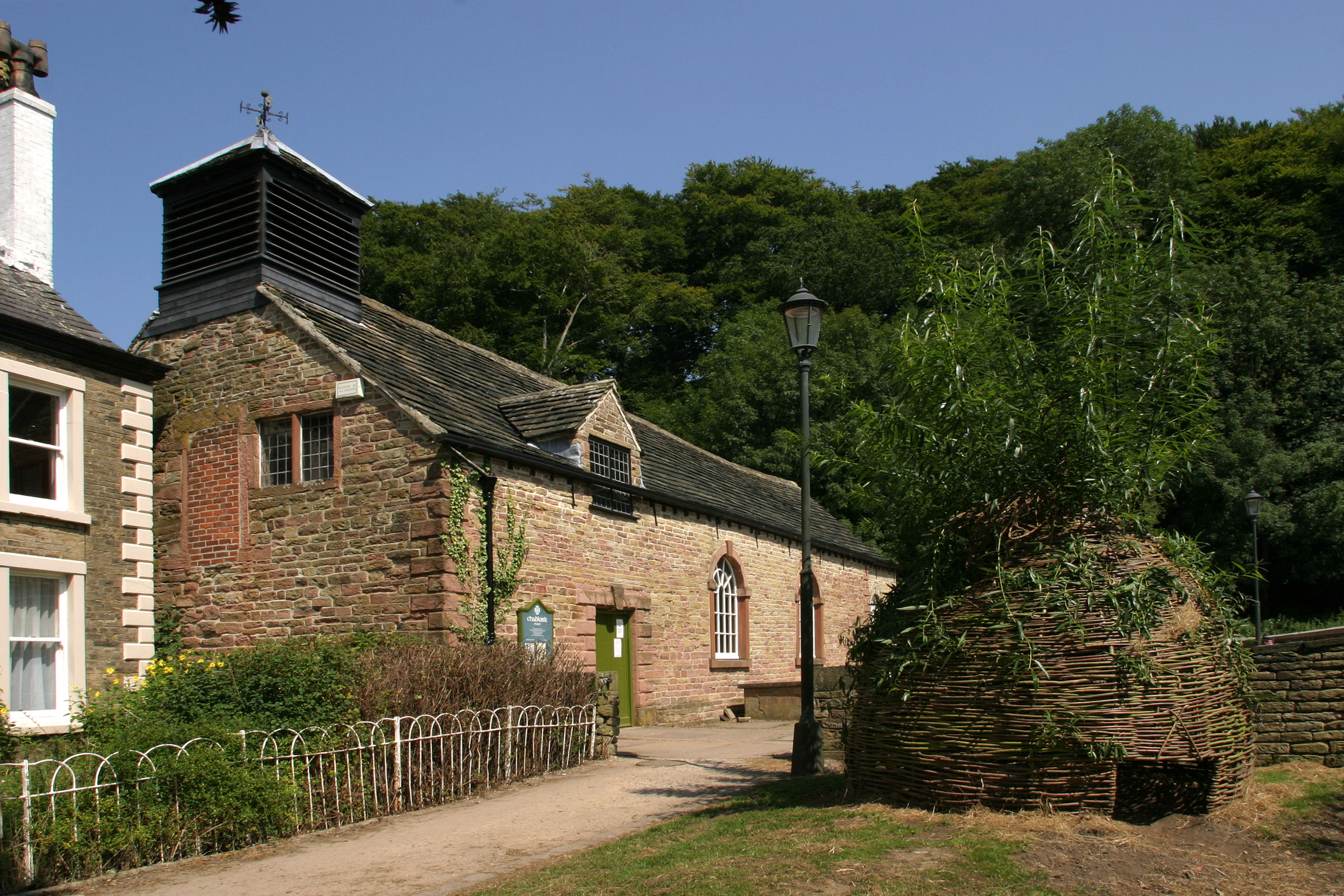
The west end of the chapel with the timber bell-cote

The present building dates from the 16th century, although the south walls were rebuilt in 1747. It is a timber-framed building with a slate roof, but most of the walls have been rebuilt in dressed stone.

At the west end is a timber bell-cote, with a pyramidal roof and a weather-vane. The south wall of the nave has two doors and two windows with semicircular heads. Above the west door is a gabled dormer window. The chancel has a semicircular-headed window. The east and north walls of the chancel retain their timber framing. At the east end is a window with a semicircular head.

== See also ==
- Grade II* listed buildings in Greater Manchester
- Listed buildings in Bredbury and Romiley
