= Bredbury and Romiley Urban District =

Former local government area in the UK

Bredbury and Romiley Bredbury (1865–1880)
- Local Government District (1865–1894); Urban district (1894–1974)
- Bredbury and Romiley UD within Cheshire in 1970
- Area
  - 1971: 1,736 acres
  - Coordinates: 53.417°N 2.100°W
- Population
  - 1901: 7,185
  - 1971: 28,529
- History
  - Created: 1865
  - Abolished: 1974
  - Succeeded by: Metropolitan Borough of Stockport
  - HQ: Bredbury

Bredbury and Romiley was an administrative district in Cheshire, England. It had its origins in a local government district created in 1865 covering the township of Bredbury. The district was enlarged in 1880 to take in Romiley, when it was renamed Bredbury and Romiley. Local government districts were reconstituted as urban districts in 1894. Compstall was absorbed into the district in 1936. Bredbury and Romiley Urban District was abolished in 1974, with the area becoming part of the new Metropolitan Borough of Stockport in Greater Manchester.

== History ==
Bredbury, Romiley, and Compstall were each townships within the ancient parish of Stockport. Such townships became civil parishes in 1866.

In 1865 a local government district was created covering the township of Bredbury, administered by an elected local board. The district was enlarged in 1880 to take in the neighbouring township or civil parish of Romiley, and the district was renamed Bredbury and Romiley.

Local government districts were reconstituted as urban districts under the Local Government Act 1894. In 1902, the urban district was enlarged on the abolition of the neighbouring township of Brinnington (which had ceded much of its territory to the borough of Stockport the previous year). The urban district council established offices at School Brow; the building was in the parish of Bredbury, but close to the border with Romiley. The council later moved its headquarters to nearby Bank House on George Lane in 1919.

The socialist activist Christopher Thomas Douthwaite was a member of Bredbury and Romiley Urban District Council from 1911 to 1947.

There was a review of boundaries in 1936. The neighbouring parish of Compstall, which had itself been an urban district since 1902, was abolished and its area absorbed into the Bredbury and Romiley Urban District. At the same time, there were more minor adjustments to the boundaries with neighbouring districts, and the urban parishes within the district were united into a single parish called Bredbury and Romiley. The urban district ceded the north-western part of its territory around Brinnington to Stockport in 1952.

Bredbury and Romiley Urban District was abolished in 1974 under the Local Government Act 1972. The area became part of the Metropolitan Borough of Stockport in Greater Manchester.
