= Metropolitan Borough of Stockport =

Borough of Greater Manchester, England

- Metropolitan borough
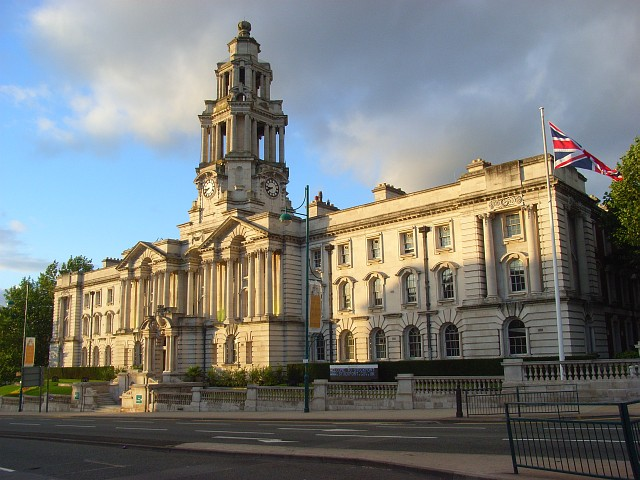
- Stockport Town Hall

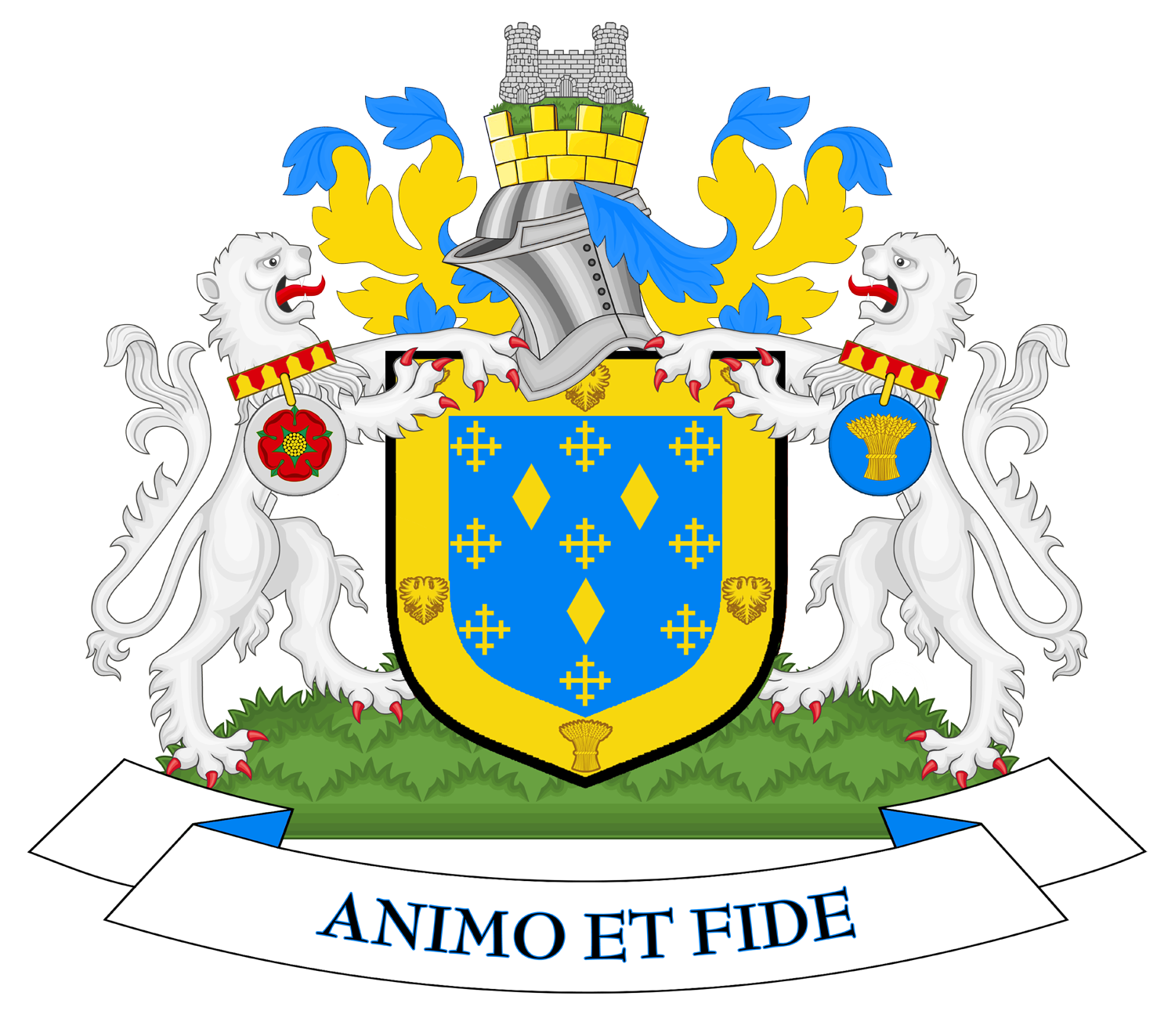
- Coat of arms
- Motto: Latin: Animo et Fide, lit. 'With courage and faith'
- Stockport shown within Greater Manchester
- Coordinates: 53°24′20″N 2°09′33″W
- Sovereign state: United Kingdom
- Country: England
- Region: North West
- Ceremonial county and city region: Greater Manchester
- Incorporated: 1 April 1974
- Named for: Stockport
- Administrative HQ: Stockport Town Hall

Government
  - Type: Metropolitan borough
  - Body: Stockport Metropolitan Borough Council
  - Executive: Leader and cabinet
  - Control: Liberal Democrat
  - Leader: Mark Roberts (LD)
  - Mayor: Kerry Waters
  - MPs: 3 MPs: Navendu Mishra (L); Tom Morrison (LD); Lisa Smart (LD)

Area
  - Total: 126 km^{2} (49 sq mi)
  - Rank: 178th

Population (2025)
  - Total: 304,879
  - Rank: 51st
  - Density: 2,419/km^{2} (6,270/sq mi)
- Demonym: Stopfordian

Ethnicity (2021)
  - Ethnic groups: List: 87.4% White; 7.3% Asian; 2.6% Mixed; 1.2% Black; 1.6% other

Religion (2021)
  - Religion: List: 47.5% Christianity; 39.6% no religion; 5.5% Islam; 0.8% Hinduism; 0.4% Judaism; 0.3% Buddhism; 0.2% Sikhism; 0.4% other; 5.2% not stated
- Time zone: UTC+0 (GMT)
  - Summer (DST): UTC+1 (BST)
- Postcode area: SK
- Dialling code: 0161; 01663 (Note: The 01663 code is used in High Lane only.)
- ISO 3166 code: GB-SKP
- GSS code: E08000007
- Website: stockport.gov.uk

The Metropolitan Borough of Stockport is a metropolitan borough of Greater Manchester, England. It lies south-east of central Manchester and south of Tameside. As well as the towns of Stockport, Bredbury and Marple, it includes the outlying suburbs and villages of Hazel Grove, Bramhall, Cheadle, Cheadle Hulme, Gatley, Reddish, Woodley and Romiley. In 2025, it had a population of 304,879, making it the fourth-most populous of Greater Manchester's ten boroughs.

== History ==
The borough was created in 1974, under the Local Government Act 1972, from the former area of the County Borough of Stockport and from the administrative county of Cheshire the urban districts of Bredbury and Romiley, Cheadle and Gatley, Hazel Grove and Bramhall, and Marple.

Stockport became a county borough in 1889 and was enlarged by gaining territory from Lancashire, including Reddish in 1906 and the Four Heatons in 1913. The Marple Urban District of Cheshire, formed in 1894, gained parts of Derbyshire in 1936, including Mellor and Ludworth from Chapel en le Frith Rural District.

Prior to its creation, it was suggested that the metropolitan borough be named Norchester, but this was rejected as "a concocted name"; it was beaten by Stockport by a vote of 16 to 5.

== Geography ==
The borough includes the following suburbs of Stockport:

- Adswood
- Bramhall, Bredbury, Brinnington
- Cale Green, Cheadle, Cheadle Heath, Cheadle Hulme, Compstall
- Davenport
- Edgeley
- Gatley
- Heaton Chapel
- Heaton Mersey
- Heaton Moor
- Heaton Norris
- Hazel Grove, Heald Green, High Lane
- Marple, Mellor
- Offerton
- Portwood
- Reddish, Romiley
- Woodford, Woodley, Woodsmoor.

== Governance ==
The borough is administered by Stockport Metropolitan Borough Council, which meets at Stockport Town Hall. The council is a member of the Greater Manchester Combined Authority, which is led by the Mayor of Greater Manchester.

=== Parliamentary constituencies ===
There are three parliamentary constituencies in the Stockport Metropolitan Borough:

- Stockport, represented by Navendu Mishra (Labour) since 2019
- Cheadle; represented by Tom Morrison (Liberal Democrats) since 2024
- Hazel Grove; represented by Lisa Smart (Liberal Democrats) since 2024.

== Demography ==
Population pyramid of Stockport, 2020

At the 2001 UK census, the Metropolitan Borough of Stockport had a total population of 284,528.

Of the 120,456 households in Stockport: 38.0% were married couples living together, 30.3% were one-person households, 8.3% were co-habiting couples and 9.4% were lone parents.

The population density is 2,257/km^{2} (5,850/sq mi) and, for every 100 females, there were 93.2 males. Of those aged 16–74 in Stockport, 25.7% had no academic qualifications, lower than 28.9% in all of England. 5.0% of Stockport's residents were born outside the United Kingdom, significantly lower than the national average of 9.2%. The largest minority group was recorded as Asian, at 2.1% of the population.

=== Population change ===
The table below details the population change since 1801, including the percentage change since the last available census data. (Note: Although the Metropolitan Borough of Stockport has only existed since 1974, figures have been generated by combining data from the towns, villages and civil parishes that would later be constituent parts of the borough.)

Population growth in Stockport since 1801
Year	1801	1811	1821	1831	1841	1851	1861	1871	1881	1891
Population	18,901	23,957	29,745	39,027	50,340	51,232	67,034	82,837	98,693	114,252
% change	–	+26.7	+24.3	+31.2	+29.0	+1.8	+30.8	+23.6	+19.1	+15.8
Source: Vision of Britain

Population growth in Stockport since 1901
Year	1901	1911	1921	1931	1941	1951	1961	1971	1981	1991
Population	135,156	159,884	172,025	185,087	204,265	225,433	256,848	292,695	288,977	288,354
% change	+18.3	+18.3	+7.6	+7.6	+10.4	+10.4	+13.9	+14.0	−1.3	−0.2
Source: Vision of Britain

Population growth in Stockport since 2001
Year	2001	2011	2021	2031	2041	2051	2061	2071	2081	2091
Population	284,544	283,300								
% change	−1.3	−0.4								
Source: Vision of Britain

=== Ethnicity ===
Ethnic Group	Year							
Ethnic Group	1991		2001		2011		2021	
Ethnic Group	Number	%	Number	%	Number	%	Number	%
White: Total	277,648	97.6%	272,230	95.7%	260,819	92.1%	257,530	87.3
White: British	–	–	264,279	92.9%	252,044	89%	245,831	83.4
White: Irish			4,155	1.5%	3,938	1.4%	4,174	1.4
White: Roma	–	–	–	–	–	–	132	<0.01
White: Gypsy or Irish Traveller	–	–	–	–	58	0.02	90	<0.1
White: Other	–	–	3,796	1.3%	4,779	1.7%	7,303	2.5
Asian or Asian British: Total	4,532	1.6%	7,282	2.6%	13,762	4.9%	21,464	7.3
Asian or Asian British: Indian	1383	0.5	1,867	0.7	2,786	1.0	4,433	1.5
Asian or Asian British: Pakistani	1579	0.6	2,949	1.0	6,673	2.4	10,953	3.7
Asian or Asian British: Bangladeshi	226	0.1	353	0.1	705	0.2	963	0.3
Asian or Asian British: Chinese	943	0.3	1,315	0.5	1,722	0.6	2,306	0.8
Asian or Asian British: Other Asian	401	0.1	798	0.3	1,876	0.7	2,809	1.0
Black or Black British: Total	1,122	0.4%	1,181	0.4%	1,958	0.7%	3,416	1.2
Black or Black British: African	231	0.1	352	0.1	976	0.3	2,030	0.7
Black or Black British: Caribbean	493	0.2	660	0.2	745	0.3	896	0.3
Black or Black British: Other Black	398	0.1	169	0.1	237	0.1	490	0.2
Mixed or British Mixed: Total	–	–	3,026	1.1%	5,104	1.8%	7,668	2.6
Mixed: White and Black Caribbean	–	–	953	0.3	1,734	0.6	2,215	0.8
Mixed: White and Black African	–	–	413	0.1	775	0.3	1,236	0.4
Mixed: White and Asian	–	–	915	0.3	1,460	0.5	2,359	0.8
Mixed: Other Mixed	–	–	745	0.3	1,135	0.4	1,858	0.6
Other: Total	1093	0.4%	809	0.3%	1,632	0.6%	4,692	1.6
Other: Arab	–	–	–	–	727	0.3	1,509	0.5
Other: Any other ethnic group	1093	0.4	809	0.3	905	0.3	3,183	1.1
Total	284,395	100%	284,528	100%	283,275	100%	294,773	100%

=== Religion ===
The following table shows the religious identity of residents residing in Stockport:

Religion	2001		2011		2021	
Religion	Number	%	Number	%	Number	%
Christian	214,610	75.4	179,005	63.2	139,951	47.5
Muslim	4,977	1.7	9,431	3.3	16,332	5.5
Jewish	1,654	0.6	1,340	0.5	1,234	0.4
Hindu	1,331	0.5	1,666	0.6	2,388	0.8
Sikh	190	0.1	330	0.1	503	0.2
Buddhism	610	0.2	853	0.3	964	0.3
Other religion	643	0.2	964	0.3	1,207	0.4
No religion	40,346	14.2	71,126	25.1	116,749	39.6
Religion not stated	20,167	7.1	18,510	6.5	15,445	5.2
Total	284,528	100.00%	283,275	100.00%	294,773	100.0%

== Economy ==
Stockport Compared
2011 UK Census	Stockport	North West England	England
Population of working age	178,400	4,839,669	35,532,091
Full-time employment	43.3%	38.8%	40.8%
Part-time employment	12.5%	11.9%	11.8%
Self employed	8.4%	7.1%	8.3%
Unemployed	2.5%	3.6%	3.3%
Retired	14.8%	14.3%	13.5%

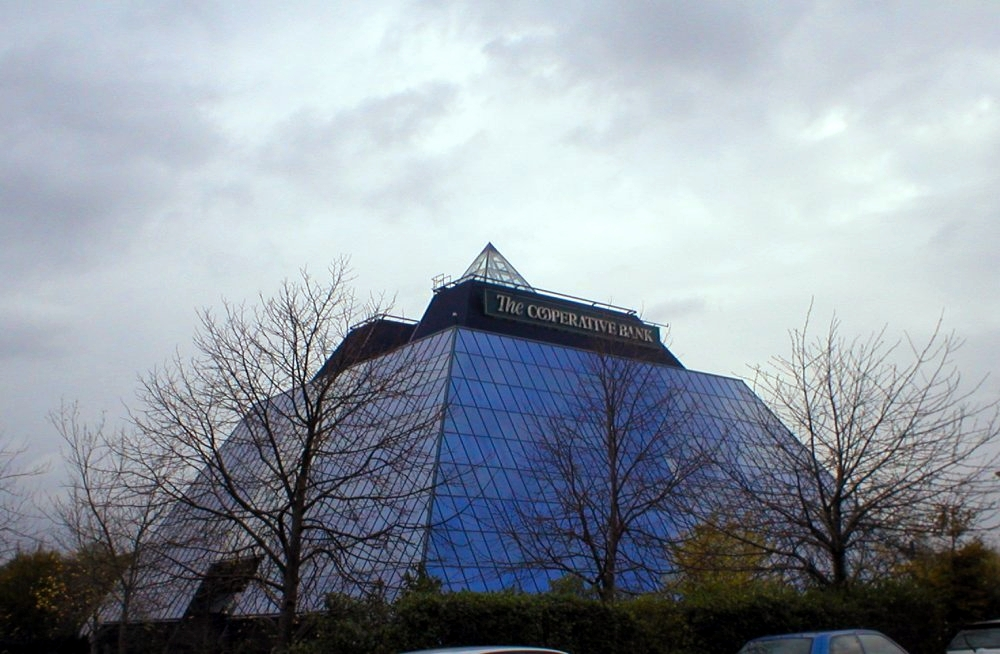
The Stockport pyramid, previously a call centre for the Co-operative Bank

The Co-operative Bank opened a telephone banking centre in the Stockport pyramid in 1994. In 1999, it became the administrative home of smile.co.uk, an internet bank owned by the Co-op. The Co-op moved out of the building in 2019; it is now occupied by an Indian restaurant.

Experian ranked Stockport fifth in North West England for shopping, which includes Stockport Peel Centre and the Merseyway Shopping Centre, which underwent a £15m redevelopment in 2008.

Medical equipment and technology, financial and professional services, computer and internet based services, and creative industries have been identified as growth industries in Greater Manchester; all have concentrations in Stockport. With employment at 2.0%, Stockport has the lowest rate of unemployment of all of Greater Manchester's ten boroughs.

Average house prices in the Stockport are second highest out of all the metropolitan boroughs in Greater Manchester, at 27.7% higher than the average for the county.

At the 2001 UK census, Stockport had 204,812 residents aged 16 to 74; of these, 2.4% were students with jobs, 3.3% students without jobs, 5.4% looking after home or family, 5.0% permanently sick or disabled, and 2.4% economically inactive for other reasons. These figures were generally in line with the national averages, although the proportion of people looking after home and family and students without jobs was significantly lower than the national average.

In 2001, of 136,059 residents of Stockport in employment, the industry of employment was: 17.3% retail and wholesale, 14.7% manufacturing, 13.8% property and business services, 11.7% health and social work, 8.9% education, 7.7% transport and communications, 6.1% construction, 5.3% finance, 4.6% public administration and defence, 4.1% hotels and restaurants, 0.7% energy and water supply, 0.6% agriculture, and 4.3% other. This was roughly in line with national figures, except for the proportion of jobs in agriculture which is less than half the national average, reflecting the town's suburban nature and its proximity to the centre of Manchester.

== Landmarks ==
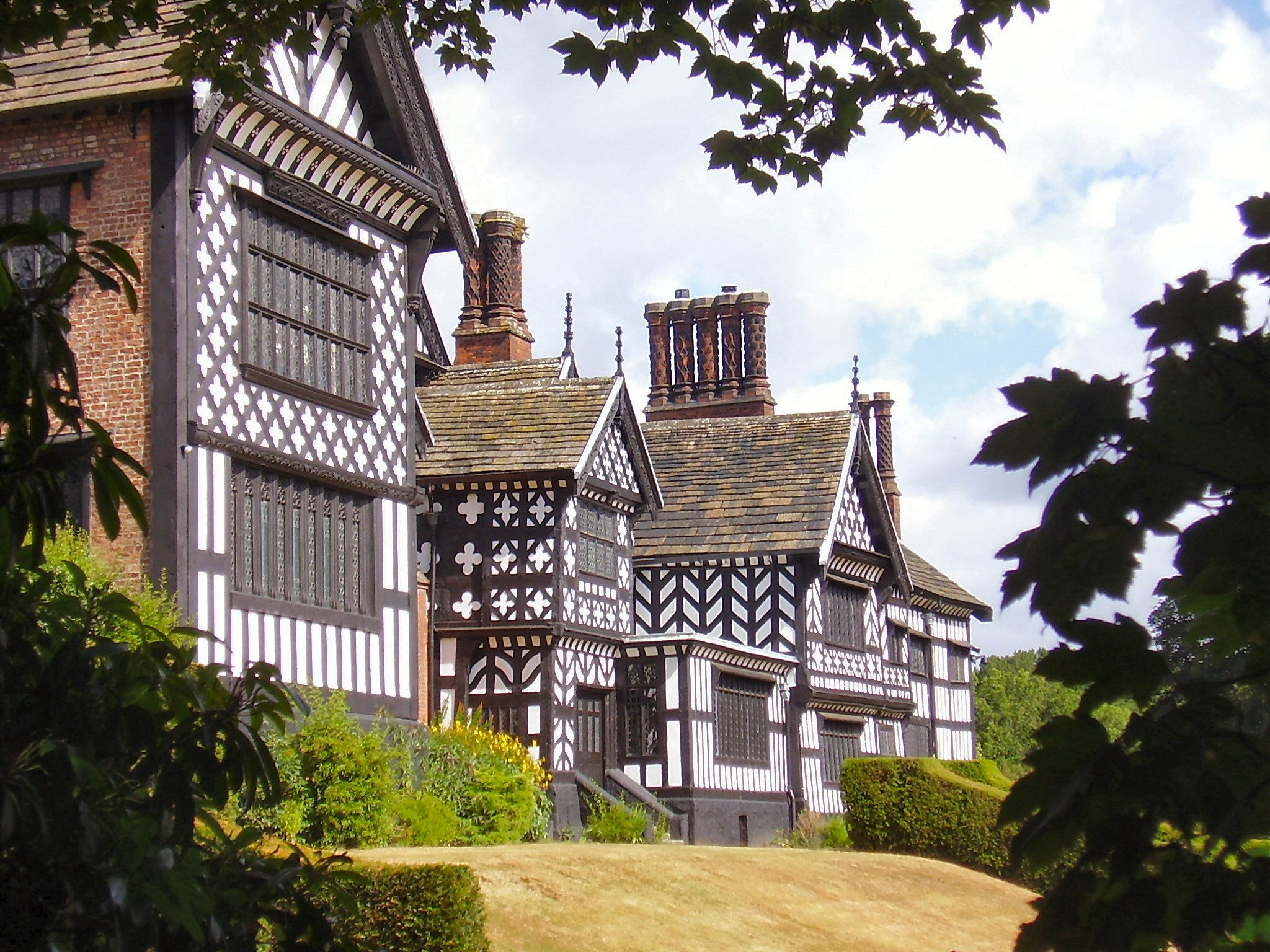
The east side of Bramall Hall, a Grade I listed building and Tudor mansion

Stockport has 386 listed buildings.

There are six Scheduled Ancient Monuments in the borough. Two date to the Bronze Age, a cairn in Ludworth and the Brown Low bowl barrow. Two related to medieval halls, Peel Hall in Heaton Moor and Torkington Moat. The final two were both built at the start of the 19th century, Oldknows Limekilns and Marple Aqueduct.

Stockport has 14 local nature reserves: Abney Hall Park, Carr Wood, Chadkirk Country Estate, Crookilley Woods, Etherow Country Park, Gatley Carrs, Heaton Mersey Common, Happy Valley, Mersey Vale Nature Park, Poise Brook, Reddish Vale Country Park, Tangshutts Fields, Woodbank Park and Wright's Wood.

== Education ==
Overall, Stockport was ranked 21st out of all the Local Education Authorities in SATs performance in 2006 and was second in Greater Manchester. Authorised and unauthorised absences from Stockport secondary schools in 2006-07 were 6.7% and 1.3% respectively, almost the same as the national average (6.8% and 1.3%).

In 2007, the Stockport LEA was ranked 30th out of 148 in the country, and second in Greater Manchester, based on the percentage of pupils attaining at least 5 A*-C grades at GCSE including Maths and English (50.0% compared with the national average of 45.8%).

In 2006, Cheadle Hulme School was the most successful school in Stockport at both GCSE and A-level; 99% of the pupils gaining five or more GCSEs at A*-C grade including Maths and English. At A-level, it was also the 72nd most successful school in the country.

== Twin towns ==
The Borough of Stockport has formal twinning arrangements with two European places:

- Béziers, France, 1972: originally twinned with the County Borough of Stockport and became twinned with the Metropolitan Borough on its creation in 1974.
- Heilbronn, Germany, 1982.

== Arms ==
Coat of arms of Metropolitan Borough of Stockport

Notes
Supporters granted 1 December 1959, rest granted 5 December 1932.
Supporters
On either side a lion Argent that to the dexter gorged with a collar vairy Or and Gules pendent therefrom by a chain Gold a plate charged with a rose Gules barbed and seeded Proper that to the sinister likewise collared and pendent from the collar by a like chain a hurt charged with a garb also Gold.
