= Werneth School =

Academy in Bredbury, Stockport, England

Location
- Harrytown; Bredbury; Stockport, Greater Manchester, SK6 3BX; England
- 53°24′46″N 2°06′23″W

Information
- Type: Academy
- Local authority: Stockport
- Trust: Education Learning Trust
- Department for Education URN: 148327 Tables
- Ofsted: Reports
- Headteacher: Rhiannon Chantler
- Gender: Coeducational
- Age: 11 to 16
- Enrolment: 1275
- Houses: Astor, Brunel, King, Lowry
- Colours: Red, Blue, Yellow and Green
- Website: wernethschool.com

Greater Manchester location map

Werneth School (formerly Bredbury Comprehensive School) is a coeducational secondary school located in Bredbury near Stockport, Greater Manchester, England.

An Ofsted report in October 2023 rated the school as "inadequate".

== History ==
=== Construction ===
The original school buildings came into use in 1941, and several additions and extensions have been added over the years. Specialist provision is available for all subjects. There are extensive playing fields, an all-weather pitch, two gymnasia, a Sports Hall, laboratory accommodation, Technology workshops, computing facilities, maths facilities and a School Library and Resource Centre.

=== 1987 arson attack ===
There was an arson attack on 31 March 1987. 40 firemen attended, taking one hour to put out the fire. The headmaster was Kenneth Boardman. The fire cost £750,000. A 14 year old and a 16 year old appeared in court, in September 1987, where the 16 year old received a three year prison sentence.

=== Awards ===
The school won the National Literacy Trust's 2006/2007 Reading Connects School of the Year Competition. The school was rated "Satisfactory" by Ofsted at that time.

The school's librarian, Nikki Heath, was awarded the School Librarian of the Year Award by the School Library Association in May 2008. On 4 December 2014, Nicky Morgan, the Secretary of State for Education visited the school.

Previously a community school administered by Stockport Metropolitan Borough Council, in January 2021 Werneth School converted to academy status. The school is now sponsored by the Education Learning Trust.

== Disability lanyards ==
In November 2024, the school was reported to be requiring pupils with disabilities to wear sunflower lanyards as a sign of their disability, with refusal to do this 'based on defiance' being a cause for disciplinary action. The policy was criticised by parents, who claimed their children were being bullied as a result of having to publicly disclose their learning disabilities. The lanyard rule is no longer in place as a result of the backlash.
