= Ludworth, Greater Manchester =

Area of Marple, Greater Manchester, England

Coordinates: 53°25′N 2°02′W

Ludworth
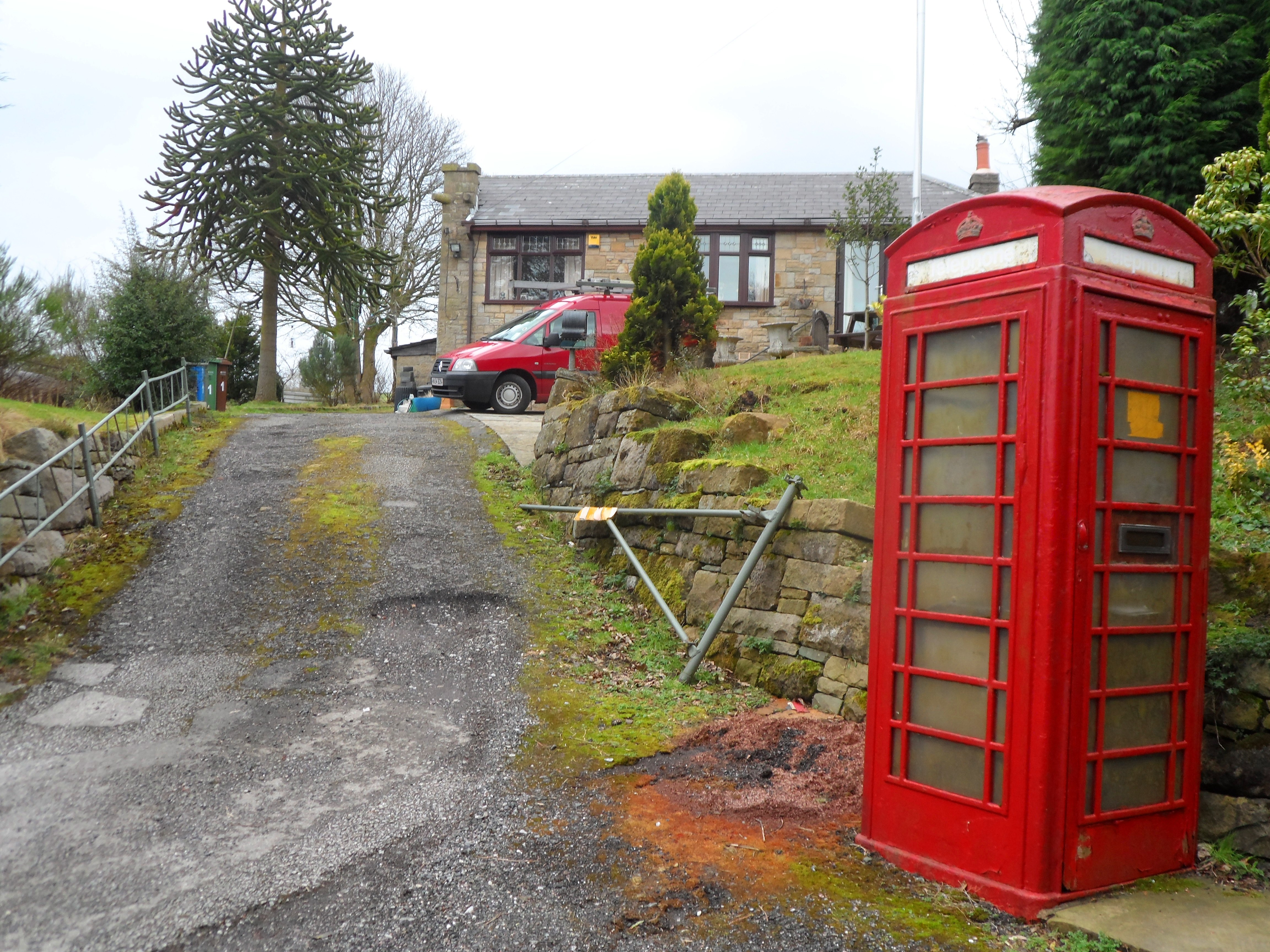

- Location within Greater Manchester
- Metropolitan borough: Stockport
- Metropolitan county: Greater Manchester
- Region: North West
- Country: England
- Sovereign state: United Kingdom
- Post town: STOCKPORT
- Postcode district: SK6
- Dialling code: 0161
- Police: Greater Manchester
- Fire: Greater Manchester
- Ambulance: North West

Ludworth is an area of Marple, in the Stockport district of Greater Manchester, England.

== History ==
Ludworth was formerly a township in the parish of Glossop. On 1 April 1896 Ludworth became a civil parish, being formed from part of Ludworth and Chisworth and became part of Glossop Dale Rural District. In 1934 it was transferred to Chapel en le Frith Rural District and on 1 April 1936 the parish was abolished and merged with Marple and became part of Marple Urban District, along with Mellor. In 1931 the parish had a population of 1926. In 1974, Marple Urban District became part of the metropolitan borough of Stockport in Greater Manchester.

The civil parish consisted of Marple Bridge and the smaller Mill Brow.

== Today ==
Though Ludworth is not often used for the area, it does live on in the name of Ludworth primary school which is located in Marple Bridge. Ludworth and Lyme is also an area within the Stockport Girl Guide organisational areas.
