= Apethorn Farmhouse =

Listed building in Hyde, Greater Manchester, England

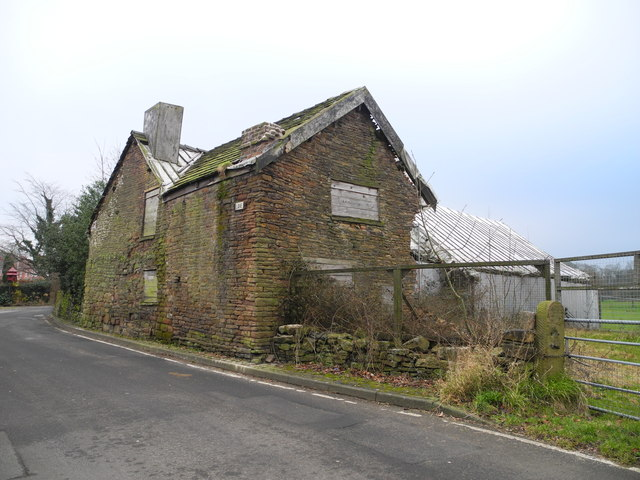
- Apethorn Farmhouse in 2013

- Location within Greater Manchester
- Alternative names: Apethorn Fold Farmhouse

General information
- Architectural style: Vernacular
- Location: Apethorn Lane, Hyde, Greater Manchester, England
- Coordinates: 53.43805°N 2.08459°W
- Year built: Early 16th century
- Renovated: 17th to 19th centuries (altered)

Listed Building – Grade II*
- Official name: Apethorn Farmhouse
- Designated: 22 December 1969
- Reference no.: 1068079

Apethorn Farmhouse is a Grade II* listed building on Apethorn Lane, near the village of Gee Cross in Hyde, within Tameside, Greater Manchester, England. It is considered an important surviving example of an early 16th-century cruck-framed farmhouse, a building type now rare in the region. Uninhabited since the 1960s and following a fire in 1993, the property was added to Historic England's Heritage at Risk Register. In 2025 a planning application was submitted to Tameside Council for the restoration and conversion of the farmhouse complex into four residential dwellings.

== History ==
Apethorn Farmhouse dates to the early 16th century, with dendrochronological analysis indicating construction between 1522 and 1542. Originally a four-bay cruck-framed open hall-house, it likely served as a longhouse, combining living quarters with space for livestock. A first floor was inserted in the 17th century, and further alterations in the 18th and 19th centuries included conversion into cottages.

By 1733 Apethorn Farm was owned by the Bretland family. During the 18th century, the farm was divided into two farmsteads: one tenanted by John Didsbury in 1750, and the other owned by John Heginbotham and his son in 1745 and 1787. The Heginbotham share was sold to William Wood in 1787 and later to Henry Swindells in 1808. The Bretland portion passed to the Tatton family and was leased to various tenants in the late 18th and early 19th centuries. Samuel Ashton purchased Swindells' share in 1822 and the remainder in 1829, using the site for dairying and other agricultural purposes. By 1939 the Barton family occupied one dwelling, while the other stood vacant. The farmstead came under the ownership of the current owner's family between the 1920s and 1930s.

Uninhabited since the 1960s, Apethorn Farmhouse was designated a Grade II* listed building on 22 December 1969 for its architectural and historic significance.

In 1993 a fire severely damaged the farmhouse, compromising much of its external fabric. Following the incident, the building was stabilised with scaffolding, and corrugated sheeting was installed to restrict access due to safety concerns. The roof coverings of the shippon (cattle shelter) and part of the farmhouse were removed, and a temporary roof structure was erected to provide protection.

In February 2025, a planning application for listed building consent was submitted to Tameside Council for the restoration and conversion of the Apethorn Farmhouse complex into four residential dwellings, together with associated infrastructure and landscaping.

== Architecture ==
The building is cruck-framed, with surviving timber trusses that exemplify early 16th-century construction techniques. Of the original five cruck trusses, four remain intact, along with some original purlins and ridge-pieces. The frame supports a graduated stone-slate roof. External walls are a mix of brick and squared rubble stone, reflecting later modifications.

The west elevation features a small gabled wing and a second bay in stone, while the remaining bays are in brick and include three doors, which correspond to the former shippon. The east elevation has three dormer windows rising from the eaves, one of them gabled. A sash window appears on the gable facing the road. Internally, the cruck trusses incorporate tie-beams, collar ties, and collar yokes, supporting the original roof structure. One truss in the shippon includes a carved capital with a rudimentary column beneath, a decorative detail not commonly found in vernacular buildings.

== Heritage at Risk Register ==
Since at least 1999, the farmhouse has been included on Historic England's Heritage at Risk Register. Its condition is recorded as "very bad," with an "immediate risk of further rapid deterioration or loss of fabric".

== See also ==
- Grade II* listed buildings in Greater Manchester
- Listed buildings in Hyde, Greater Manchester
