= Werneth =

Werneth may refer to:

- Werneth, Cheshire, England
- Werneth, Greater Manchester, England; a district of Oldham
- Werneth, Victoria, Australia
