= Gee Cross =

Village in Tameside, Greater Manchester, England

Coordinates: 53.4380°N 2.0677°W

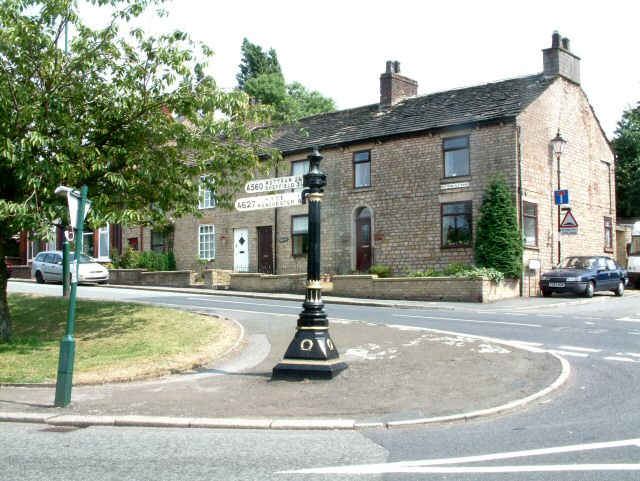
- Gee Cross village centre

- Location within Greater Manchester
- OS grid reference: SJ9593
- Metropolitan borough: Tameside
- Metropolitan county: Greater Manchester
- Region: North West
- Country: England
- Sovereign state: United Kingdom
- Post town: Hyde
- Postcode district: SK14
- Dialling code: 0161
- Police: Greater Manchester
- Fire: Greater Manchester
- Ambulance: North West
- UK Parliament: Stalybridge and Hyde

Gee Cross is a village and suburb of Hyde within Tameside Metropolitan Borough, in Greater Manchester, England.

== History ==
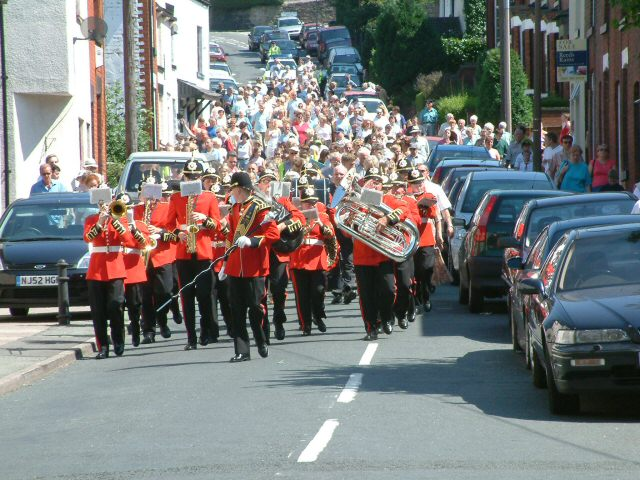
Gee Cross well dressing festival, 2003

Gee Cross village centre dates back to the times of the Domesday Book. Originally, Gee Cross was the larger village in the immediate area; however, Hyde grew during the Industrial Revolution and is now the major town, having merged into the north of Gee Cross.

The village contains modern day Hyde's first place of Christian worship, Hyde Chapel, built in 1708. This would serve as the main church in the area for over a century until St George's Church was built in the centre of Hyde in 1832.

Historically, the village, latterly as part of the borough of Hyde, was a part of Cheshire until the creation of Greater Manchester in 1974. The village has neither statutory boundaries nor civil parish status. Tradition would dictate that the northern boundary is at a location known as the Big Tree, just past Lilly Street, which now commemorates those that lost their lives in the Falklands War of 1982.

Gee Cross is home to a recently instituted well dressing festival, which is an ancient custom in the Pennines. Another recent addition is the annual village fete, which is a major fundraising event for local charities; it is held on the site of the former reservoir, the Queen Adeleide Reservoir, now known as Sam Redfern Green, which is now classified as the village green.

== Geography ==
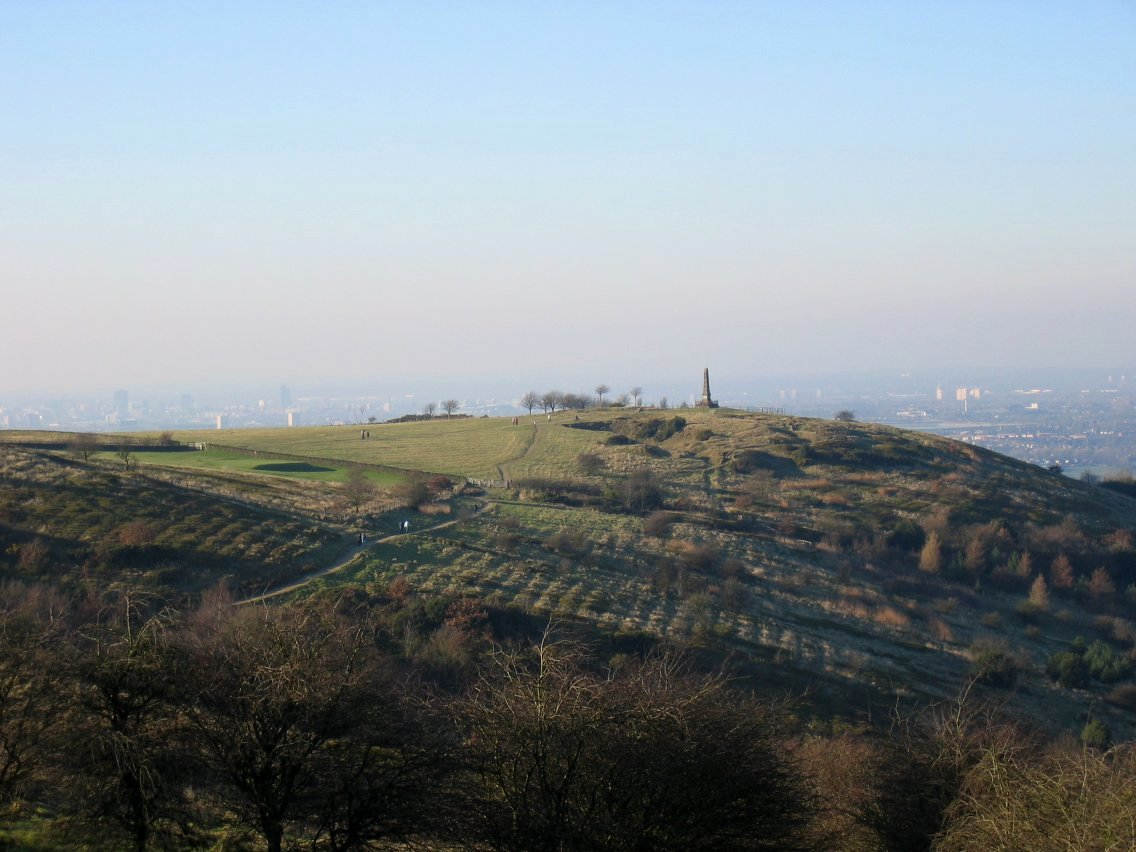
Werneth Low

Gee Cross is built on the side of a hill called Werneth Low, a part of the Pennines, which surrounds the village to the south and east. Werneth Low is a protected country park that was first created as a war memorial by the people of Hyde. The park has a visitors centre and ranger service. On a clear day, there are views across Greater Manchester, as well as Lancashire and Merseyside; the Welsh mountains are sometimes visible. Sightseers can view Manchester city centre, including the tallest tower in the UK outside of London - Deansgate Square South Tower. The Hare and Hounds pub sits on the top of Werneth Low, as does Hyde Cricket and Squash Club and Werneth Low Golf Club.

To the south-west, the village borders Woodley in the Metropolitan Borough of Stockport. Within Tameside, Hyde town centre merges with Gee Cross along its northern border and the village of Godley, also a part of Hyde, is found to the north-east. Across Werneth Low, Hattersley lies to the east and Romiley to the south.

== Amenities ==
The centre of the village hosts a small commercial district, which has grown in recent years to include some office-based businesses; these include an estate agents, hairdressing salons and barbers, a pharmacy, laundrette, bakers, florists, tattooist, cafes, bistros, takeaways and a wine bar. In addition, at the bottom of Stockport Road, is a former car dealership that was once run by Volkswagen and then by Audi. The local Post Office was formerly located on the corner of School Lane and Stockport Road, but was closed in the phasing out of smaller branches; it has now become a private house.

=== Pubs ===
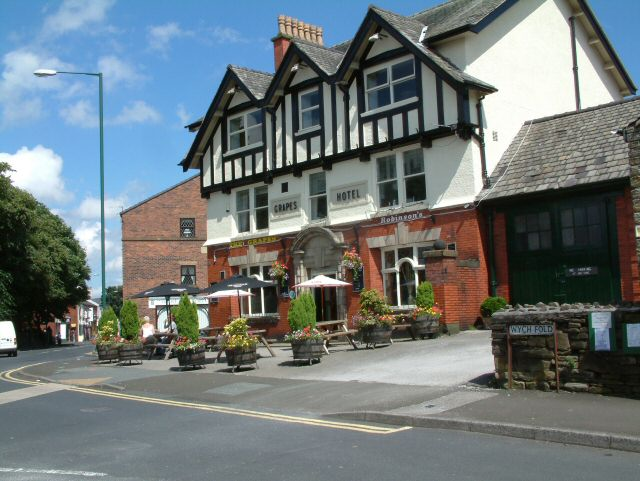
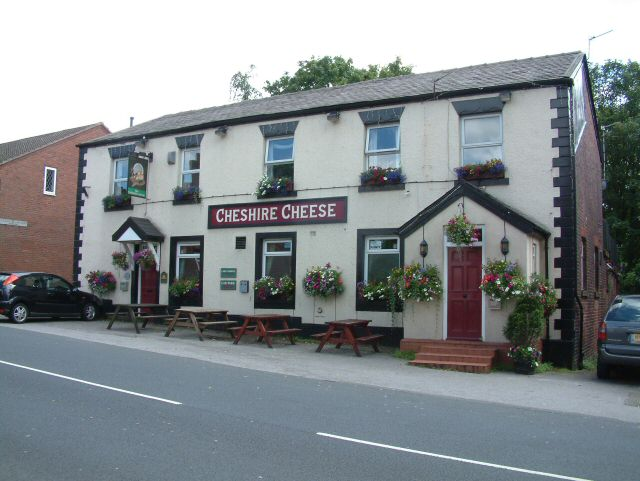
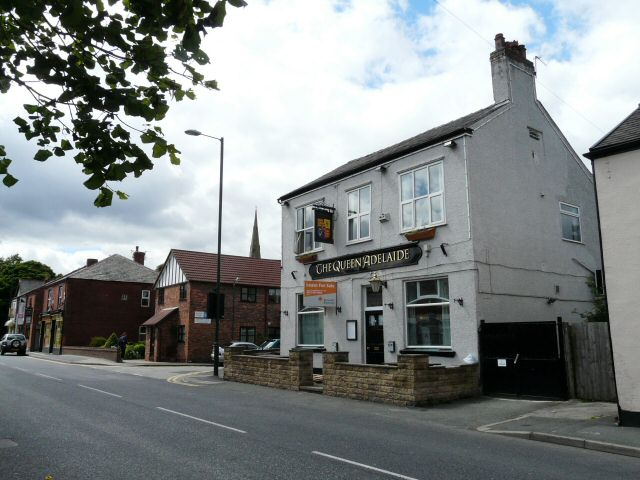
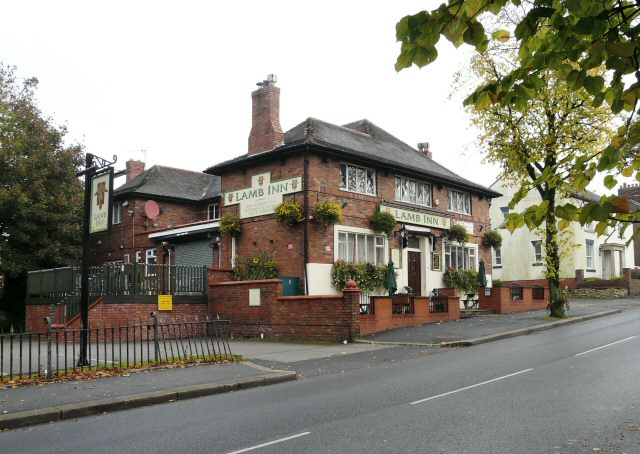
Pubs of Gee Cross include (clockwise): The Grapes Hotel, The Cheshire Cheese, The Lamb Inn (now closed) and The Queen Adelaide.

The village is a popular social venue, featuring numerous pubs alongside newer restaurants and bars. These include The Buxton, The Queen Adelaide, The Werneth and The Cheshire Cheese.

In 1817, the Cheshire Cheese premises were three private cottages owned by Bristowe Cooper. Behind them was a small dingle called Sugar Loaf Wood and one could walk down a path through this to a plantation which was owned by Samuel Ashton, the cotton magnate. The cottages were later transformed into a school for the children of Gee Cross and Bristowe Cooper became the schoolmaster. Around 1857, the school was closed and the premises became a butcher's shop, a beerhouse and a grocer's shop. The three cottages were then owned by Benjamin Cocker, who was also the first licensee of the beerhouse and who gave it the sign of the Cheshire Cheese. After Benjamin left, Betsy Emery ran the three shops single handedly for many years. The Emery family occupied the "Cheese" until around 1974, the butchers became part of the pub in 1919 and the grocer's shop closed in 1959. It was a freehouse until 1943, when it was bought by Yates Brewery and then it later came under the John Smiths banner. Under new management in 2020, the "Cheese" has once again started to be the heart of the Gee Cross community and the Grapes Hotel. The former Lamb Inn has been converted to a day nursery. Another addition to the already thriving Gee Cross pub scene is the Joshua Bradley. Named after the former Mayor of Hyde and situated on the borders of the village, this 19th-century former private hall (Bamford Hall in its previous incarnation) has been subject to a £3 million transformation by Hydes brewery.

=== Education ===
Gee Cross contains two primary schools: Dowson Primary and Gee Cross Holy Trinity (CofE). Just outside Gee Cross is Alder Community High School, which is a new secondary school built in 2004. It is a computing and maths specialist school, which teaches over 800 11-16 year olds.

=== Religion ===
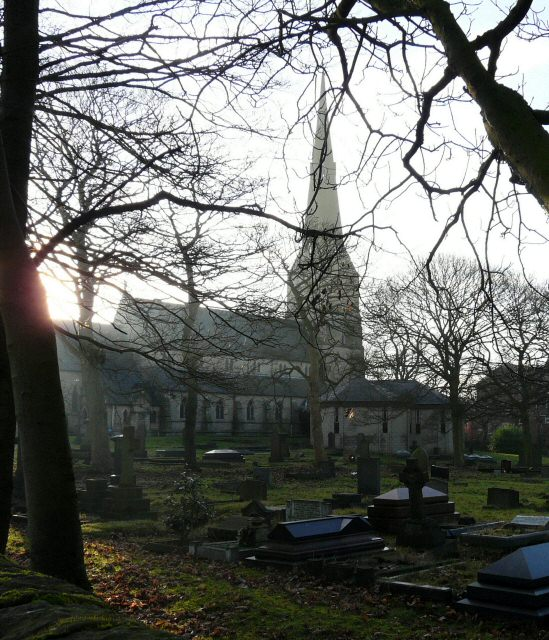
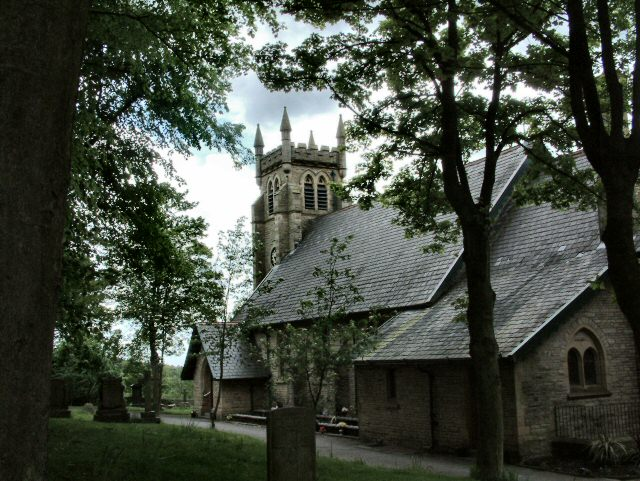
Churches in Gee Cross include Hyde Chapel (left) and Gee Cross Holy Trinity (right).

There are three churches in Gee Cross: an Anglican, Methodist and Unitarian Church. The Unitarian Church in the centre of the village is called Hyde Chapel. The Anglican Church is called Gee Cross Holy Trinity and is affiliated with the primary school. Gee Cross Methodist Church is the other church in the village.

== Notable people ==
- Daniel Benson: Four time national Boxing champion
- Warren Bradley: Manchester United footballer
- John Bramwell: English singer-songwriter, frontman for the three-piece alternative rock band I Am Kloot.
- Tom Cassell (a.k.a. Syndicate): YouTube gamer/Weekday Vlogger
- Tommy Chow: Olympic cycling medallist
- Mick Coleman: Composer and songwriter of Brian & Michael The Matchstalk Men
- Brian Day: Musician, founding member of the Syd Lawrence Orchestra. Also worked with Neil Sedaka, 10cc and Barclay James Harvest.
- Jack Griffiths: Manchester United footballer, who later worked as a physiotherapist at Richmond House, Stockport Road.
- Ricky Hatton: Famous boxer, lived in Gee Cross. He died at his mansion in Bowlacre Road in 2025.
- Nigel Howard: First class cricketer, born in Gee Cross, Hyde, and played test cricket for England. He played first class cricket for Lancashire between 1946 and 1954, he played his four tests between 1951 and 1952. He became Lancashire's youngest ever captain in 1949 and, in 1950, he led Lancashire to a shared Championship title.
