= Godley Hall Inn =

Listed former pub in Godley, Greater Manchester, England

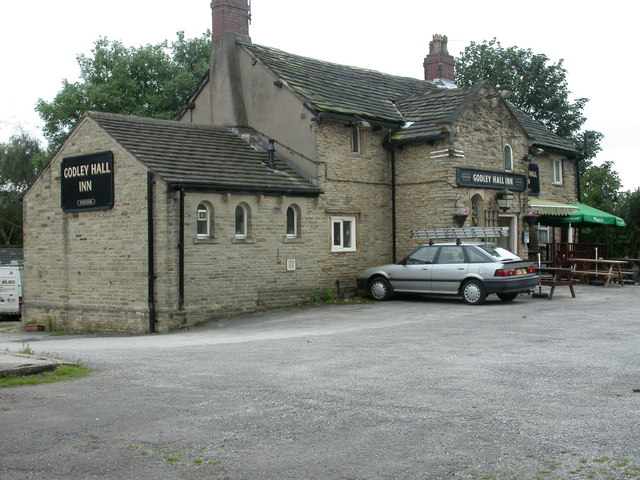
- The pub in 2009, before its closure in 2020

- Location within Greater Manchester
- Alternative names: Godley Hall

General information
- Status: Converted to residential use
- Type: Public house (former)
- Location: Godley Hill, Godley, Greater Manchester, England
- Coordinates: 53.4512°N 2.0516°W
- Year built: 1718; 308 years ago
- Closed: 2020 (as a pub)

Design and construction
- Designations

Listed Building – Grade II
- Official name: Godley Hall public house
- Designated: 6 February 1986
- Reference no.: 1068082

The Godley Hall Inn is a Grade II listed former public house on Godley Hill in Godley, a suburb of Hyde in Tameside, Greater Manchester, England. Built in 1718 as a house, it was in use as a pub by 1830. The pub closed in 2020, and a local group sought to have it listed as an asset of community value so they could buy it for community use, but they were unable to raise the required funds before the deadline. It was subsequently sold to a Stalybridge‑based developer, who applied for and received planning permission and listed building consent in 2021 to convert it back into a private dwelling.

== History ==
The building was constructed in 1718 as a house, according to its official listing, with the date appearing on a door lintel. It was in use as a public house by 1830. The 1877 and 1935 Ordnance Survey maps show the building without a name or designation. On 6 February 1986, Godley Hall was designated a Grade II listed building.

The pub closed in 2020, and a local group attempted to have it listed as an asset of community value so they could buy it and retain it for community use. They were unable to raise the required funds before the deadline, and the pub was instead sold to a Stalybridge-based developer. The new owner stated an intention to convert the former pub back into a private dwelling, and a planning application with accompanying listed building consent was submitted in September 2021 and approved in December that year.

In 2023 the developer who had purchased the Godley Hall Inn won an appeal against a refusal issued by Tameside Council the previous year, resulting in permission being granted for a four‑bedroom house on the former pub's car park.

== Architecture ==
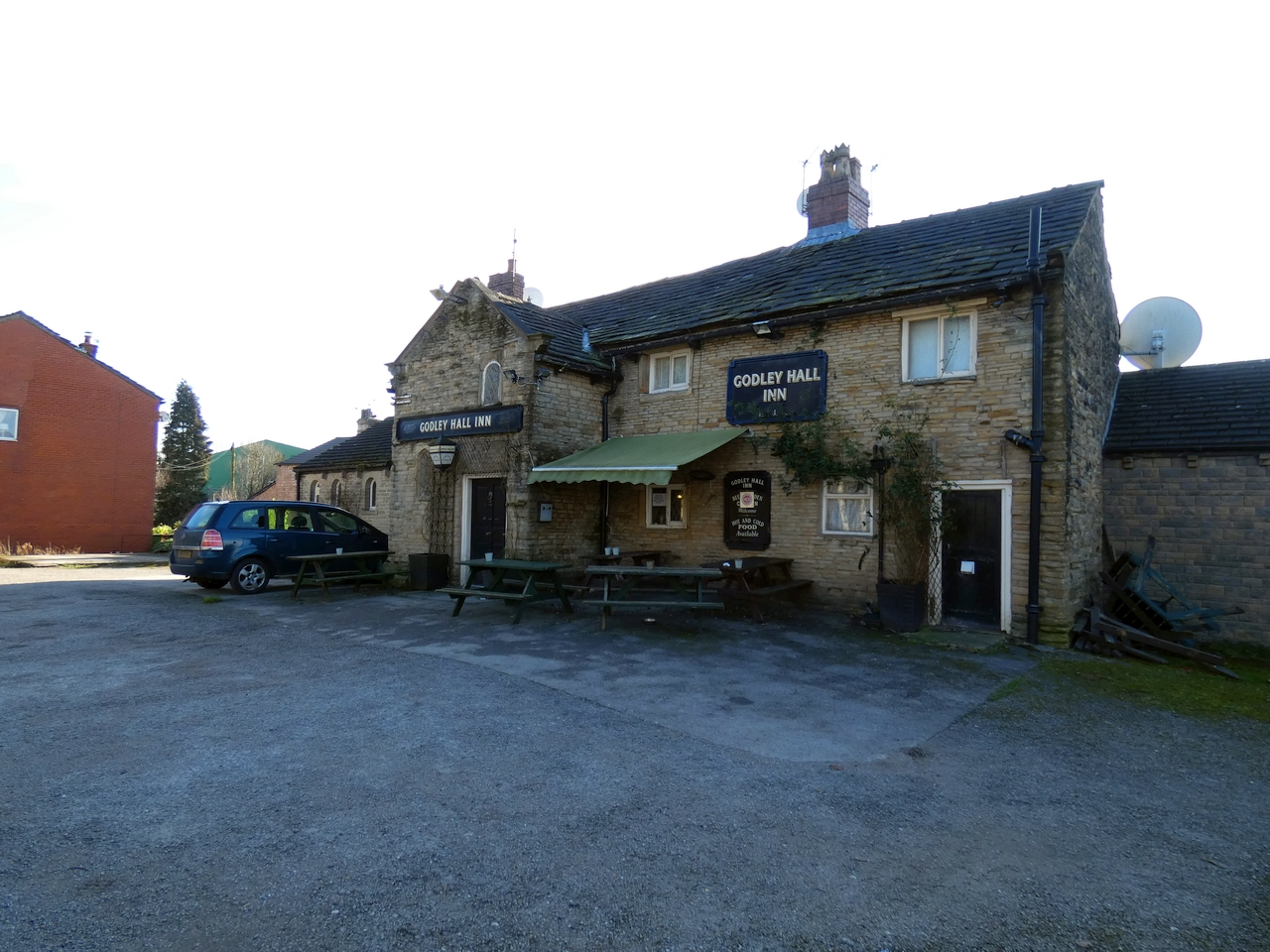
The building in 2020, viewed looking southeast

The building is constructed of roughly shaped stone with a stone‑slate roof and brick chimneys. It has two storeys and three bays, and its first entrance, now at the back, indicates an early layout where the doorway opened into a small lobby. A two‑storey projection at the rear, now used as the main entrance, serves as a porch, and later extensions were added to both ends of the house.

Each floor has three window openings, which together once formed three stone‑framed windows with two panes each; two of these had protective mouldings above them, and all have since lost their original stone dividers. There are also two simple casement openings and one with a rounded top. The porch includes two similar rounded‑top openings, a raised base, an entrance set slightly to one side, and a gabled front with shaped stones at the base and a ball ornament at the peak. There are two chimneys along the roofline and a later doorway added on the right side.

At the back, a former doorway has been filled in, though its shaped stone frame and a finely carved dated lintel remain. There is also a three‑pane stone‑framed window and a single‑storey extension built slightly later than the main structure.

== See also ==
- Listed buildings in Hyde, Greater Manchester
- Listed pubs in Greater Manchester
