= Frank Knowles =

English footballer (1891–1951)

Personal information
- Full name: Frank Knowles
- Date of birth: May 1891
- Place of birth: Hyde, Cheshire, England
- Date of death: 20 January 1951 (aged 59)
- Place of death: England
- Position: Fullback

Senior career*
Years	Team	Apps	(Gls)
1911	Stalybridge Celtic		
1911–1919	Manchester United	47	(1)
1919	Hartlepool United	162	(10)
1919	Manchester City	2	(0)
1919	Stalybridge Celtic		
1921–1922	Ashington	38	(3)
1922–1923	Stockport County	15	(1)
1923–1924	Newport County	17	
1924–1925	Queen's Park Rangers	22	
1925–1926	Sandbach Ramblers		
1926	Ashton National		
- Macclesfield
- * Club domestic league appearances and goals

Frank Knowles (May 1891 – 20 January 1951) was an English footballer. His regular position was at full back. He was born in Hyde, Cheshire. He played for Manchester United, Stalybridge Celtic, Sandbach Ramblers, Hartlepool United, Manchester City and Queens Park Rangers. During the War he guested for Skelmersdale United, Hyde, Arsenal, Oldham Athletic and Manchester City,
