= Len Hopwood =

English cricketer (1903–1985)

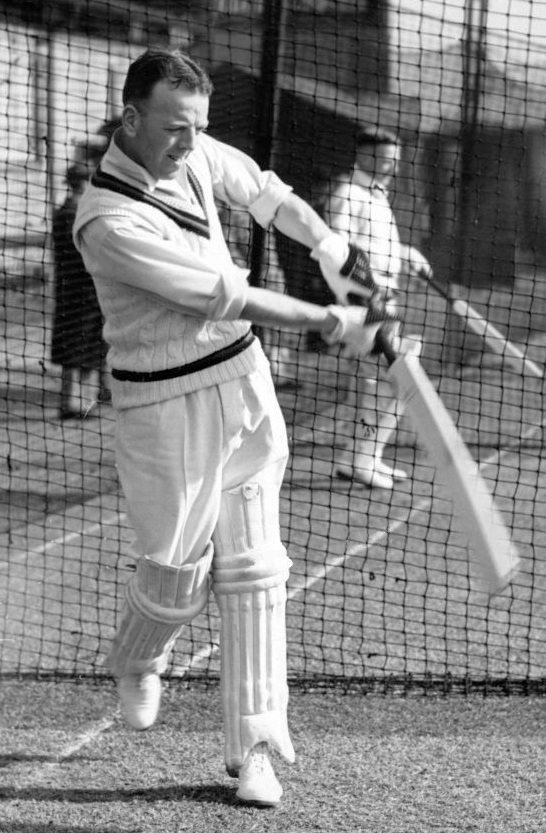
- Hopwood in about 1939

Personal information
- Born: 30 October 1903; Newton, Lancashire, England
- Died: 15 June 1985 (aged 81); Denton, Lancashire, England
- Batting: Right-handed
- Bowling: Left-arm medium

International information
- National side: England
- Test debut: 6 July 1934 v Australia
- Last Test: 20 July 1934 v Australia

Career statistics
Competition	Test	First-class
Matches	2	400
Runs scored	12	15,548
Batting average	6.00	29.89
100s/50s	0/0	27/70
Top score	8	220
Balls bowled	462	43,449
Wickets	0	673
Bowling average	–	22.45
5 wickets in innings	–	35
10 wickets in match	–	6
Best bowling	–	9/33
Catches/stumpings	0/–	198/–
- Source: CricInfo, 7 November 2022

John Leonard Hopwood (30 October 1903 – 15 June 1985) was a Lancashire cricketer who was the focal point of the county's Championship win in 1934. During this period he was an effective if unattractive all-rounder and played twice for England, though he failed to make any impact in either game with bat or ball.

== Biography ==
Born 30 October 1903, Newton, Hyde, Cheshire, Hopwood began playing for Lancashire in the 1920s as a solid right-hand batsman, but after playing fairly often for the first team in 1924 and 1925 he dropped out until 1928. In that year, however, he helped the team to their finest record ever in the County Championship with a number of surprising performances as an accurate left arm spinner, the best of which was nine for 74 against Middlesex, five for 71 against Derbyshire and six for 20 against Wales. He also hit a century against Worcestershire.

1929 saw Hopwood establish a regular place he held until the war and with Hallows declining and rule changes reducing what had previously been remarkable run-scoring, he became of great value to the team even if he was very slow and ungraceful with a backlift consistently compared with Bill Woodfull. 1930 saw Lancashire return to the top of the table and Hopwood had a major role with 949 runs and 63 wickets. His best figures were five for 18 against Essex at Leyton and five for 40 against Northamptonshire at Old Trafford.

The next two years were ordinary, but in the dry summer of 1933 Hopwood suddenly jumped to the top of the tree, scoring over 1,900 runs and revealing himself one of the soundest and most patient opening batsmen in the game. Late in the season he confirmed his skill as a bowler by taking eleven wickets on a good pitch against Middlesex and then completing the match double against Leicestershire with a return of nine for 33, which was a surprising leap from his previous best 7 for 91. Although Hopwood had been prior to that used mainly as a defensive bowler with six men on the leg side, this match showed he could be as deadly as Verity on a sticky pitch.

1934 was Hopwood's greatest year, however. His batting was not quite so good as in 1933, but with 220 against Gloucestershire and his skill as a bowler he was seen as too good to miss a place in the Test team. However, with the likes of C.F. Walters and the incomparable Herbert Sutcliffe to fill Hopwood's natural place as an opener, there was little hope he would be successful trying to play a game foreign to his nature. As for his bowling, nobody believed he could get wickets against batsmen with the superlative footwork of Bradman, Kippax or Ponsford on good pitches, whilst on bad pitches Verity would – as at Lord's – do everything that was required. Thus it was unsurprising when Hopwood scored only twelve runs in two innings and set a record for bowling the most balls in Test cricket (462) without taking a wicket. His economy in the Old Trafford Test on a featherbed pitch, however, drew praise form the critics even if it was clear he did not have Verity's cleverness. Nonetheless, for Lancashire Hopwood had three deadly matches on worn or sticky pitches:

- nine for 69 and six for 43 against Worcestershire
  - on a pitch that crumbled
- seven for 13 and five for 55 against Glamorgan
- five for 32 and eight for 58 against Derbyshire
  - both on rain-affected wickets that were rare in a dry summer

1935 saw Hopwood maintain his all-round form and do the "double" of 1,000 runs and 100 wickets for the second successive year, but after a few good performances early in 1936 his bowling declined severely. Hopwood did maintain his batting until the war despite dropping down the order, but by 1937 his spin and accuracy as a bowler had completely gone – a savage loss for Lancashire who had a high frequency of rainy weather and wet wickets that required a spin bowler of the standard Hopwood was at between late 1933 and the end of 1935.

Though aged forty-three, Hopwood intended to resume his career after the war but a major illness put paid to such ambitions. He died 15 June 1985, Denton near Manchester.
