= Trevor Grimshaw =

English artist (1947–2001)

- Born: 1947; Hyde, Cheshire
- Died: 2001 (aged 53–54)
- Occupation: Artist

Trevor Grimshaw (1947–2001) was an English artist whose main subject is the northern industrial town landscape as it used to be.

== Life and work ==
Grimshaw was born in Hyde, Cheshire in 1947 and studied at the Stockport College of Art from 1963 to 1968. He worked in oils, charcoal and graphite, producing largely monochrome depictions of the industrial landscape of northern England.

Grimshaw had a longstanding interest in steam engines and trainspotting. He made several visits to the Woodham Brothers scrapyard at Barry in South Wales and photographed the steam locomotives stored there. In 1977 he published Stilled Life, a book containing 36 black-and-white photographs from the scrapyard.

He spent much of his working career at Manchester advertising agency Stowe Bowden Ltd.

=== Artistic career ===
Grimshaw exhibited in the UK and abroad, including at the Royal Scottish Academy and the Royal Academy during the 1970s. His work was held in private collections including those of L. S. Lowry, Edward Heath, the Warburton family and Gerald Kaufman, and in public collections including the Tate, Salford Art Gallery, Stockport Art Gallery and Bury Art Gallery.

He illustrated The Singing Street, a book of poems by Mike Harding, and executed limited edition lithographs for Christie's Contemporary Art. He also collaborated with composer Peter McGarr in 'Echoes and Reflections' at Cornerhouse Gallery, Manchester and did the title slide images for the early BBC Great Railway Journeys of the World series. Artist Geoffrey Key described Grimshaw, a long time friend, as "one of the most important graphic artists working in the north during the last half of the 20th century".

His work included black-and-grey graphite depictions of canals, cityscapes, viaducts and steam trains. He also produced works depicting megaliths, Stonehenge, quarries in North Wales and motorway construction. His colour works included Cheshire landscapes and images of Clarice Cliff ceramics.

L. S. Lowry bought three of Grimshaw's works from an early exhibition.

In 1973, the North West Arts Association published ''Townscape: Trevor Grimshaw'', reproducing 30 of his drawings. A retrospective exhibition was held at Stockport Art Gallery in 2004.

In December 2011, two of Grimshaw's graphite drawings were sold at an auction conducted by Adam Partridge in Congleton for £3,200 and £3,800, respectively.

== Final exhibitions and death ==
By the time of his death, in a house fire in November 2001, Grimshaw had become an alcoholic and a reclusive figure. He held his last show in 1997 in the County Museum and Art Gallery at Prostějov, Czech Republic, his 50th show in his 50th year.

Grimshaw's daughter organised a retrospective exhibition of his work at Stockport Art Gallery from February to May 2004.

In 2019, Grimshaw's daughter Ceridwen Grimshaw discovered previously unused negatives from his visits to the Woodham Brothers scrapyard at Barry in the 1970s. Around 90 of the photographs were exhibited at Stockport Museum and Art Gallery from 11 May to 15 June 2019 in an exhibition titled ''Trevor Grimshaw—Unseen Barry Photographs''. A book of 47 photographs from the archive, also titled ''Trevor Grimshaw – Unseen Barry Photographs'', was published in 2019. The photographs document steam locomotives stored at the scrapyard and the effects of exposure to the sea air.

A book showing 47 of the photographs titled Trevor Grimshaw – Unseen Barry Photographs written by former colleagues the late Frank Dixon and John Keith, and fellow artist Martin Dobson (who accompanied Grimshaw on 2 of his Barry trips) was published in 2019. An Exhibition of Grimshaw's Barry (South Wales) Photographs shown at the Up-front Gallery in the village of Unthank near Penrith in Cumbria 11 July until 8 August 2021; The photographs show the corroding effects of sea air on the hundred plus steam locomotives parked at Woodham's scrapyard awaiting scrapping, most to be eventually saved.

Messum's St. James London Gallery achieved the highest price to date (£10k) for a Grimshaw at their Elemental North Exhibition in 2014.
