= Clarendon Square Shopping Centre =

Coordinates: 53.4511°N 2.0777°W

- Location: Hyde, Tameside, Greater Manchester
- Opened: 1994; 32 years ago (current building)
- Manager: Commercial Real estate Management Limited
- Owner: MCR Property Group
- Num. of stores: 69 Stores (2008)
- Num. of anchor tenants: 3
- Floor area: 122,500 sq ft (11,380 m^{2})
- Floors: 1
- Website: www.clarendonsquare.co.uk

Clarendon Square Shopping Centre is a shopping mall in the town centre of Hyde, Greater Manchester. It holds multiple different retailers including both chain stores and independents, along the town's indoor market hall and outdoor market. The shopping centre opened in 1963 but it has since been redeveloped and renamed. It consists of the main retail mall, the Market Hall, along with additional sections of mall at the eastern-end. It is nearby the other major shopping areas of the town centre, such as Market Place and Market Street, and it is also close to the towns two major supermarkets, Asda and Morrisons.

== History ==
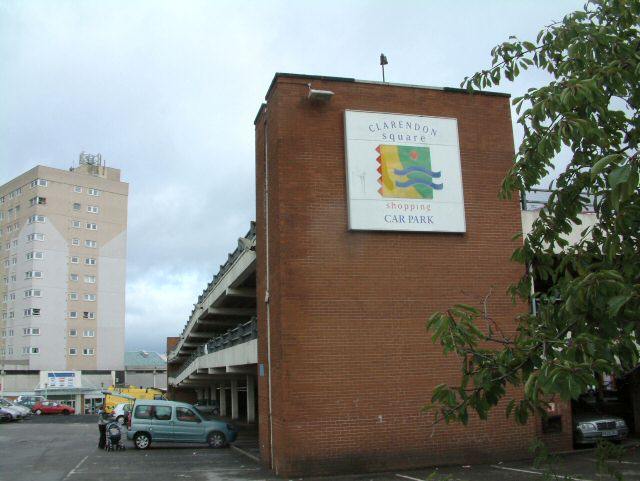
The old Clarendon Square car park (Demolished in 2014)

The original Hyde Town centre land including part of the market ground was given by the then Hyde Council to the Metropolitan Railway Surplus Land company in an exchange plan for them to redevelop the ageing market ground and old shops. Several notable old building including the original Hyde Council offices, police office and the Norfolk Arms Hotel, noted in history for "May's Downfall" in April 1828, also various other small shops and two streets of "two up two down" terraced hoses namely Helen Street and Norbury Street, were demolished to make way for the new development. The redeveloped was opened in 1963 by the Mayor of Hyde as an open air precinct including a new Market Hall, market stalls and a multi-storey car park but by 1980 it was in decline, with consistent vandalism combined with poor construction materials and appearance deterring retailers from locating within it. In 1990 the freeholders of the precinct, the local council (TMBC) and other organisations stepped in to sort out the centre and initiate a redevelopment strategy. In 1994 that plan was made a reality with the centre extended and made undercover, along with a revamp of the existing new market hall and increased retail space. It is now extremely popular within the catchment area and it boasts a number of well-known chain stores such as B&M (closed down), O_{2}, Argos(closed down)) and Superdrug. It is now owned by Manchester-based property group, MCR Property Group. In recent years, Clarendon Square Shopping Centre has seen a decline in footfall due to ever-changing shopping habits; leading to the closure of many of the centres stores. Despite this, retailers such as: Peacocks & One Below have moved in to the centre, boosting footfall. Locals, however, are calling on the council for more to be done to help boost Hyde's Shopping Centre offering. In 2014, Clarendon Square's multi story car park was demolished in order to make way for a KFC restaurant to be built in its place. The multistorey car park was built on the site of the Chartist meeting hall. Chartism is an important part of Hyde's history yet no blue plaque has been erected noting its former place.

== Transport links ==
The towns main bus station is located about 5 minutes walk away, and this provides a range of services to destinations across Greater Manchester and beyond.

Hyde Central Railway Station is just a short distance away. Running frequent services to Manchester Picadilly and Rose Hill Marple operated by Northern Rail
