= Listed buildings in Hyde, Greater Manchester =

Hyde is a town in Tameside, Greater Manchester, England. The town and the nearby area contains 37 listed buildings that are recorded in the National Heritage List for England. Of these, one is listed at Grade II*, the middle grade, and the others are at Grade II, the lowest grade. The listed buildings include houses, farmhouses, farm buildings, churches and associated structures, a public house, a former hatter's workshop, bridges crossing the Peak Forest Canal, a boundary stone, a canal warehouse, a railway viaduct, civic buildings, a former theatre, and war memorials.

== Key ==
Grade	Criteria
II*	Particularly important buildings of more than special interest
II	Buildings of national importance and special interest

== Buildings ==
Name and location	Photograph	Date	Notes	Grade
Apethorn Farmhouse; 53.43809°N 2.08457°W		Early 16th century	Alterations were carried out in the 17th to 19th centuries. The farmhouse and shippon are cruck-framed, and have brick and stone walls and a stone-slate roof. There is a main range of three bays, and a three-bay wing. The windows include a sash window and three dormers. Four of the original five crucks have survived.	II*
Cruckframe building 53.46024°N 2.08906°W		16th century (probable)	The remaining part of Newton Hall, it was rebuilt in 1970. The building is cruck framed with timber framed side walls on a stone plinth, rendered at the rear, and with a thatched roof. The windows are mullioned, and inside are three pairs of crucks.	II
Higher Matley Hall; 53.46017°N 2.03883°W	—	17th century	A timber framed house, later encased in stone, rendered at the rear, on a rendered plinth, it has a slate roof with coped gables. The house has two storeys and a T-shaped plan. There is a two-storey porch containing a door with a moulded surround, and most of the windows are mulliond with hood moulds.	II
Stocks; 53.43726°N 2.07090°W		1712	The stock ends are in the graveyard of Hyde Chapel. They are in plain stone with rounded heads, they are grooved for foot restraints, and one is dated.	II
Godley Hall public house 53.45119°N 2.05163°W		1718	Originally a house and later a public house, now converted back to a dwelling, it is built in stone with a stone‑slate roof. There are two storeys and three bays, with later extensions at each end. The original stair wing, later the porch, has two storeys, a projecting plinth, two round-headed windows, and a coped gable with ball finials. Most of the other windows are mullioned, some with hood moulds. At the rear is a blocked doorway with a moulded surround and a dated lintel.	II
Hat maker's workshop 53.43586°N 2.06747°W		18th century	The workshop is in stone with a brick extension at the rear and a stone-slate roof. It is a small single-storey building, and contains doors, windows with stone sills and lintels, and at the rear are four steam release windows.	II
Miniature castle and cottage 53.45585°N 2.02997°W	—	Late 18th century	The façade was added to the farmhouse and cottage in the 19th century. The buildings are in stone with roofs of stone-slate and 20th-century clay tiles. There are three bays, all with embattled parapets. The first bay is a three-storey tower on a projecting plinth with mullioned and transomed windows, a band, and projecting corner piers. The other bays have two storeys, there is a door with a square-cut surround in the middle bay, and in the third bay, which is higher, is an engraved stone.	II
Wood End Canal Bridge, Peak Forest Canal; 53.44553°N 2.08688°W		1794–1801	Also known as Captain Clarke's Bridge, it is a roving bridge carrying Woodend Lane over the canal. The bridge is in stone, and consists of an elliptical arch that has parapets with replacement coping on the north side and square end piers. On the south side is a spiral walkway.	II
Manchester Road Canal Bridge, Peak Forest Canal; 53.45257°N 2.08670°W		1804	A road and roving bridge over the canal that has been subsequently widened. The original stone bridge has an elliptical arch, and was widened to the north in the mid-19th century with a truncated elliptical arch with a keystone, and in the 20th century with a footpath bridge. The bridge was widened to the south later in the 19th century in brick. The towpath bridge has a spiral walkway, cast iron parapet walls, and a flat deck in stone-slate.	II
197 Talbot Road; 53.46464°N 2.06004°W		Early 19th century	A house in brick at the front and stone at the rear with a slate roof. It has a stone plinth, rusticated quoins, two storeys, and three bays. The central doorway has a rusticated surround, a keystone, and a pediment, and there is a blind window above. The other windows are casements with keystones.	II
Boundary stone 53.43356°N 2.08486°W		Early 19th century (probable)	The stone marks the boundary between the former townships of Werneth and Bredbury. It consists of a stone slab with a shaped head built into a stone wall and inscribed with the names of the townships.	II
Pole Bank Hall; 53.43535°N 2.08297°W		Early 19th century	A country house, it was extended later in the 19th century, a wing was added in the 20th century, and it has since been used for other purposes. The house is in brick on a stone plinth, with a band, an eaves cornice, a blocking course, and a hipped slate roof. There are two storeys, a rear wing, and a single-storey wing to the left. At the entrance is a tetrastyle Ionic porch with a frieze containing wreaths, a pediment, and a door with a fanlight. The windows are sashes with stone sills and flat brick arches, and on the left side is a two-storey three-window bay window.	II
Canal warehouse 53.45298°N 2.08644°W		1828	The warehouse, later used as offices, is in brick with stone dressings, and has a slate roof with coped gables. There are two storeys at the front and three at the rear, and fronts of five and three bays. The windows are 20th-century casements with round brick arches and stone sills. There are loading bays with canopies and winches at the top; the loading bays have either been glazed or filled in.	II
St George's Church; 53.44656°N 2.07884°W		1831–32	A Commissioners' church, it is in stone with a slate roof. The church consists of a nave, north and south aisles, a short chancel, and a west tower. At the corners are octagonal piers with pinnacles. The tower has three stages, a west doorway, a four-light window, clock faces, a coped parapet with octagonal corner columns with pinnacles, and flanking doors on the sides. On the south aisle wall is a sundial.	II
St Mary's Church; 53.46533°N 2.05963°W		1840	A Commissioners' church in Romanesque style, with the chancel added in 1877 by J. Medland and Henry Taylor. It is in sandstone with slate roofs, and consists of a nave, a south porch, and a chancel with a north organ loft and vestry. At the west end is a central doorway above which is a three-light window, a circular bell opening, and a pediment. This is flanked by turrets with pyramidal roofs.	II
239 Mottram Road; 53.45155°N 2.06211°W	—	c. 1840	A brick house on a stone plinth with a Welsh slate roof. It has a double-depth plan, two storeys with attics, and a symmetrical front of three bays. There is a central round-headed doorway with a fanlight, and the windows are sashes. In front of the garden is a low stone wall with saddleback coping, iron railings, a brick end pier on the right, and a stone end pier on the left.	II
Hearse house 53.44657°N 2.07947°W	—	1841	The hearse house is outside St George's Church. It is in stone and has a slate roof with coped gables. In the gable end facing the road is a doorway with a rusticated surround, a Tudor arch, and a dated keystone carved with skull and crossbones.	II
Railway Viaduct; 53.45585°N 2.06402°W	—	1841	The viaduct was built by the Sheffield, Ashton-under-Lyne and Manchester Railway. It is in brick with stone dressings, and consists of nine semicircular arches on square piers. There are stone bands and copings.	II
Hyde Chapel; 53.43753°N 2.07197°W		1846–1848	A Unitarian church designed by Bowman and Crowther in Gothic Revival style. It is in stone and consists of a nave with a clerestory, north and south aisles, a south porch, a chancel with a vestry, and a west steeple. The steeple has a four-stage tower with buttresses, an octagonal stair turret, a three-light west window, and a broach spire with lucarnes.	II
St John the Baptist's Church, Godley; 53.45487°N 2.06444°W		1849–50	A Commissioners' church designed by E. H. Shellard, with the tower added in 1878, it is in stone with a slate roof. The church consists of a nave, north and south aisles under separate roofs, a south porch, a chancel, and a west tower. The tower has three stages, an octagonal stair turret with a spire rising higher than the tower, diagonal buttresses, a clock face, and an embattled parapet with gargoyles.	II
Folly, 239 Mottram Road; 53.45187°N 2.06210°W	—	Mid-19th century (probable)	The folly in the back garden is in red brick encased on three sides with sandstone, and has one tall storey over a basement. It has a stepped parapet at the front and corbelled embattled parapets elsewhere, a cylindrical northwest turret, a recessed centre with corner turrets, and arrow slits, and on the west side is a round-headed opening with brick voussoirs.	II
St Paul's Church and presbytery 53.45615°N 2.07025°W		1853–54	A Roman Catholic church designed by Weightman, Hadfield and Goldie in Decorated style, with the chancel and Lady chapel were added in 1899 by Edmund Kirby. The church and presbytery are in sandstone with Welsh slate roofs. The church consists of a nave with a clerestory, north and south aisles, and a chancel with a Lady Chapel. At the west end is a buttress with a niche containing a statue, and on the gable is a bellcote. At the east end of the south aisle is a sacristy linking with the presbytery, making an L-shaped plan.	II
St Thomas' Church; 53.45100°N 2.07076°W		1867–68	The church, designed by J. Medland and Henry Taylor, is in sandstone with dressings and decoration in red brick, and slate roofs. It consists of a nave, north and south aisles, and a chancel with a vestry. At the west end is a double door under a pointed arch, a triple lancet window, and on the gable is a bellcote. At the east end of the south aisle is a tall chimney with a corbelled top and a bell with a gabled cover on its east face.	II
Holy Trinity Church; 53.43918°N 2.06479°W		1873–74	The church was designed by J. Medland and Henry Taylor, and the tower was added in 1903. It is in stone with a slate roof, and consists of a nave, a south porch, a north transept, a chancel with a vestry and organ chamber, and a west tower. The tower has three stages, angled buttresses, bands, clock faces, an embattled parapet, and octagonal corner pinnacles. The gables have bargeboards, and at the east end is a three-light window.	II
Bandstand; 53.45720°N 2.07729°W		Late 19th century	The bandstand is in Hyde Park, and has an octagonal plan and a brick base. The cast iron columns have crocket capitals, and support a dome-shaped copper roof with a decorative crown and a weathervane.	II
Flowery Field Church; 53.45627°N 2.08426°W		1878	Built as a Unitarian church and designed by Thomas Worthington, it is in stone and has a slate roof with coped gables and cross finials. The church consists of a nave, north and south transepts, a polygonal chancel and an almost detached southwest tower. The tower has three stages, a corner stair turret, angled buttresses, and an embattled parapet. There are stair towers with conical roofs flanking the transepts.	II
Town Hall; 53.45079°N 2.07975°W		1883–1885	The town hall, which was extended in 1913, is in red brick with sandstone dressings and slate roofs. It has two storeys and a basement in stone, and the main front on Market Street has eleven bays, the outer bays projecting forward as pavilions with hipped roofs and finials. The entrance has a round-headed doorway that has wide pilasters with fluted capitals, an entablature with a decorated frieze, and brackets carrying a balustraded balcony. The bay rises to form a tower with clock faces and an octagonal cupola. Other features include oriel windows.	II
Lychgate; 53.44667°N 2.07924°W		1885	The lychgate is at the entrance to the churchyard of St George's Church. It has low stone walls with octagonal end piers carrying timber posts. The roof is in slate and has pierced ridge tiles, finials, and a wrought iron cross. There is an inscription on the eaves beam.	II
St Stephen's Church; 53.46112°N 2.08396°W		1889–1891	The church is in stone with a slate roof. It consists of a nave with a clerestory, a west polygonal baptistry, north and south aisles, a south porch, a polygonal chancel, and a northwest steeple. The steeple has a tower incorporating a porch, it has three stages, angled buttresses, a semi-octagonal stair turret, clock faces, and a broach spire with lucarnes.	II
Bus shelter 53.45099°N 2.07929°W		Late 18th or early 19th century	Originally a tram shelter, the bus shelter is opposite the Town Hall. It has four main cast iron columns with crocket capitals and decorative pierced spandrels, and in between are intermediate columns with ball finials supporting a timber and glass screen. On the top is a glazed canopy with rounded ends, and elaborate cast iron finials.	II
Former Theatre Royal; 53.45011°N 2.08055°W		1901–02	The theatre is in red brick and terracotta with a Welsh slate roof, three storeys and attics. It has a symmetrical front of nine bays, the central bay being wide, with a decorated pediment and an arch with a keystone and decoration in the tympanum on the top floor. There are corner pilasters, bands between the floors, sash windows, two oeil-de-boeuf windows flanked by balustrading in the attic, and finials. Over the doors is a canopy, and on the roof is a lantern.	II
Walden, 22 Backbower Lane; 53.44233°N 2.06469°W	—	1903	A house designed by Barry Parker and Raymond Unwin in Arts and Crafts style, it is in roughcast brick on a rendered plinth, and has a double-pitched red tile roof. The house has two storeys and a keyhole-shaped plan, with polygonal projections to the northwest. The windows are either fixed or casements, and some have hood moulds. Many of the internal fittings have been retained.	II
Godley Hill war memorial 53.45174°N 2.05208°W		1920	The war memorial is in a circular garden surrounded by a stone wall. It has a two-stepped square base, a plinth, and a granite obelisk. There are inscriptions on the front of the plinth and on the upper step of the base, and the names of those lost in the two World Wars are included.	II
Victoria Street war memorial 53.46129°N 2.06142°W		1920	The war memorial is in a triangular garden at a road junction. It is in sandstone and about 3.6 metres (12 ft) tall. There is a three-stepped square base, and a plinth with a pediment, on which stands the statue in bronze of a soldier holding a rifle. On the memorial are inscriptions and the names of those lost in the two World Wars and in subsequent conflicts.	II
Hyde war memorial 53.43833°N 2.05511°W		c. 1920	The war memorial is on Hackingknife Hill. It is in granite, and consists of a rusticated and banded obelisk. On the base is an inscription and a plaque commemorating the Second World War. The memorial is surrounded by plain railings with wreaths on the corners.	II
Bennett Street war memorial and railings 53.46266°N 2.07709°W		1920s (probable)	The war memorial is at a road junction, and stands in an area enclosed by decorative railings with spikes. It is in stone and consists of a tall square-shaped shaft, which has carved panels at the bottom and cross motifs at the top. The shaft is on a square base that carries an inscription and the names of those lost in the First World War.	II
