= Kenneth Horsfield =

- Born: 30 September 1920; Hyde, Cheshire, England
- Died: 18 August 1944 (aged 23); Brindisi, Italy
- Burial place: Bari War Cemetery
- Military career
- Allegiance: United Kingdom
- Branch: British Army
- Service years: 1939–1944
- Rank: Corporal
- Service number: 3531119
- Unit: Manchester Regiment
- Conflicts: Second World War: North African campaign; Italian Campaign †
- Awards: George Cross

Kenneth Horsfield, GC (30 September 1920 – 18 August 1944) was a British soldier of the Manchester Regiment who was posthumously awarded the George Cross for "most conspicuous gallantry" shown in attempting to rescue a comrade trapped and injured by an explosion in Italy in 1945.

== Second World War ==
Horsfield enlisted in the British Army in 1939 and served in North Africa.

In the early afternoon of 18 August 1944, an ammunition explosion in the demolition area of Military Establishment 54 (ME 54, Mil. Est. 54) in Brindisi killed two men and injured three more. Horsfield ran to the scene, with ammunition exploding all around him. He was unable to release one injured man but ran to fetch a fire extinguisher to try and control the fire when it became exhausted. A second explosion occurred causing him injuries from which he died on his way to hospital.

The Commanding Officer of ME54 said, "In view of the great sacrifice this soldier made, to save the life of another, and with full knowledge of the likelihood of another fatal explosion, I have no hesitation in recommending him for the posthumous award of the George Cross". Notice of Horsfield's award appeared in The London Gazette on 23 March 1945, reading:

The King has been graciously pleased to approve the posthumous award of the George Cross, in recognition of most conspicuous gallantry in carrying out hazardous work in a very brave manner, to:— No. 3531119 Corporal Kenneth Horsfield, The Manchester Regiment (Hyde, Cheshire).

— London Gazette

Horsfield is buried in Bari War Cemetery.
