= Waldorf Playing Fields =

Fields in Hyde, Greater Manchester, England

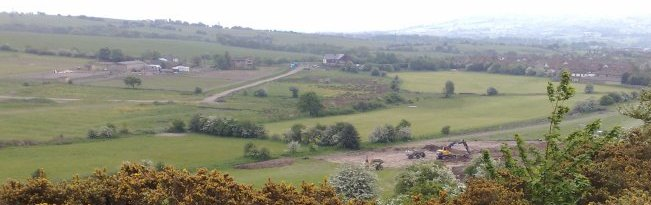
The Playing Fields

The Waldorf Playing Fields are three fields adjacent to Matley Lane in Hyde, Tameside.

== History ==
The playing field was donated to the people of the Borough of Hyde for recreation by Newton Mill Ltd. in 1973, but had a covenant restricting their use as a "recreation ground for the use of the residents of Hyde".

The Borough of Hyde was incorporated into the Metropolitan Borough of Tameside on 1 April 1974 under the Local Government Act 1972. In 1986 Tameside became a unitary authority with the abolition of the Greater Manchester County Council.

The fields are currently subject to a dispute regarding their future use. Tameside Council is proposing the sale of two of the fields, subject to the lifting of the covenant. There is a local group campaigning to retain the fields for public use.
