= Hyde Town Hall =

Municipal building in Hyde, Greater Manchester, England

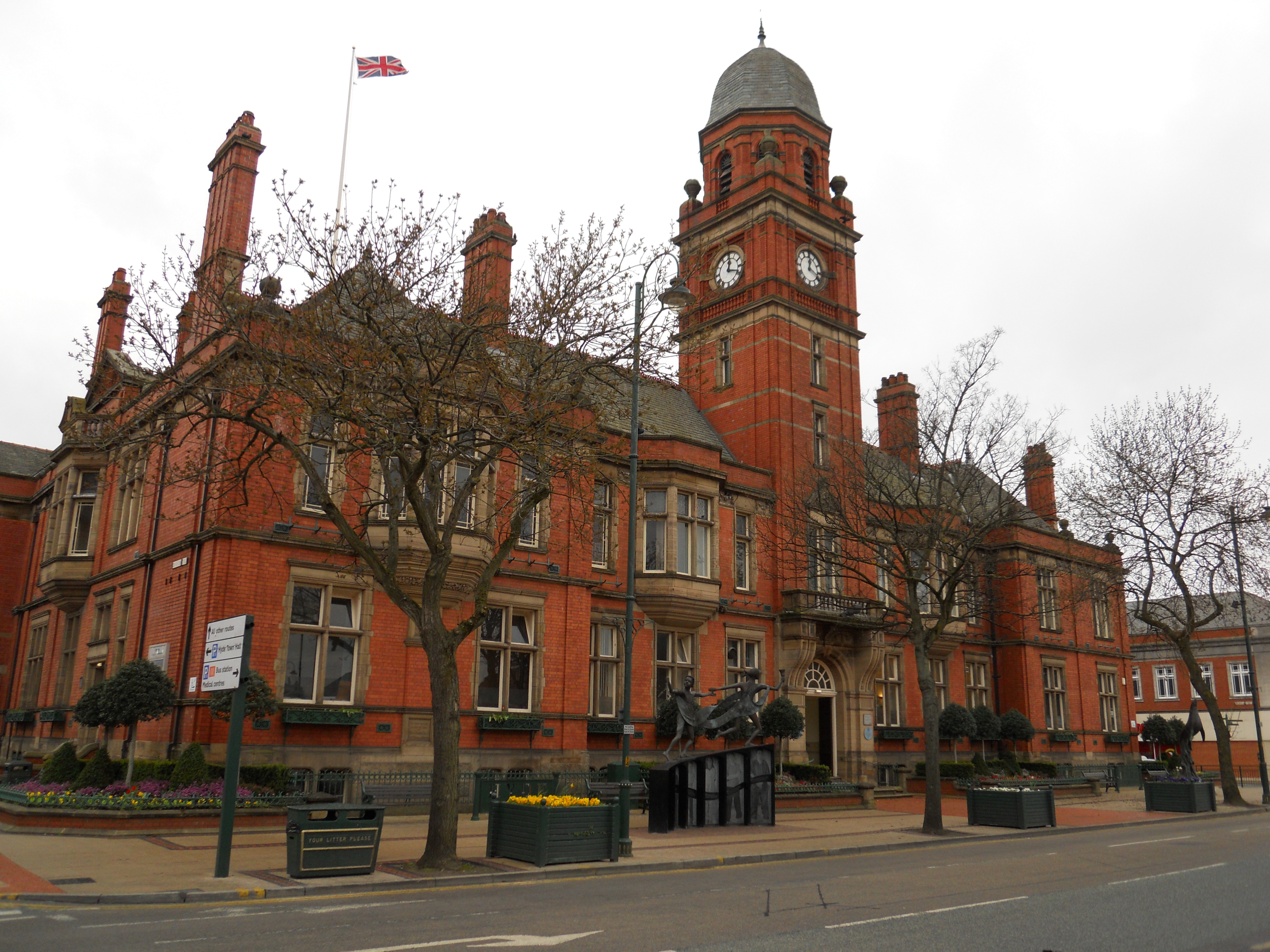
- Hyde Town Hall

- Shown in Greater Manchester
- 53.4508°N 2.0800°W
- Location: Market Street, Hyde

History
- Built: 1885

Site notes
- Architect: James William Beaumont
- Architectural style: Neoclassical style

Listed Building – Grade II
- Official name: Hyde Town Hall
- Designated: 9 December 2009
- Reference no.: 1393594

Hyde Town Hall is a municipal building in the Market Street, Hyde, Greater Manchester, England. The town hall, which was the headquarters of Hyde Borough Council, is a grade II listed building.

== History ==
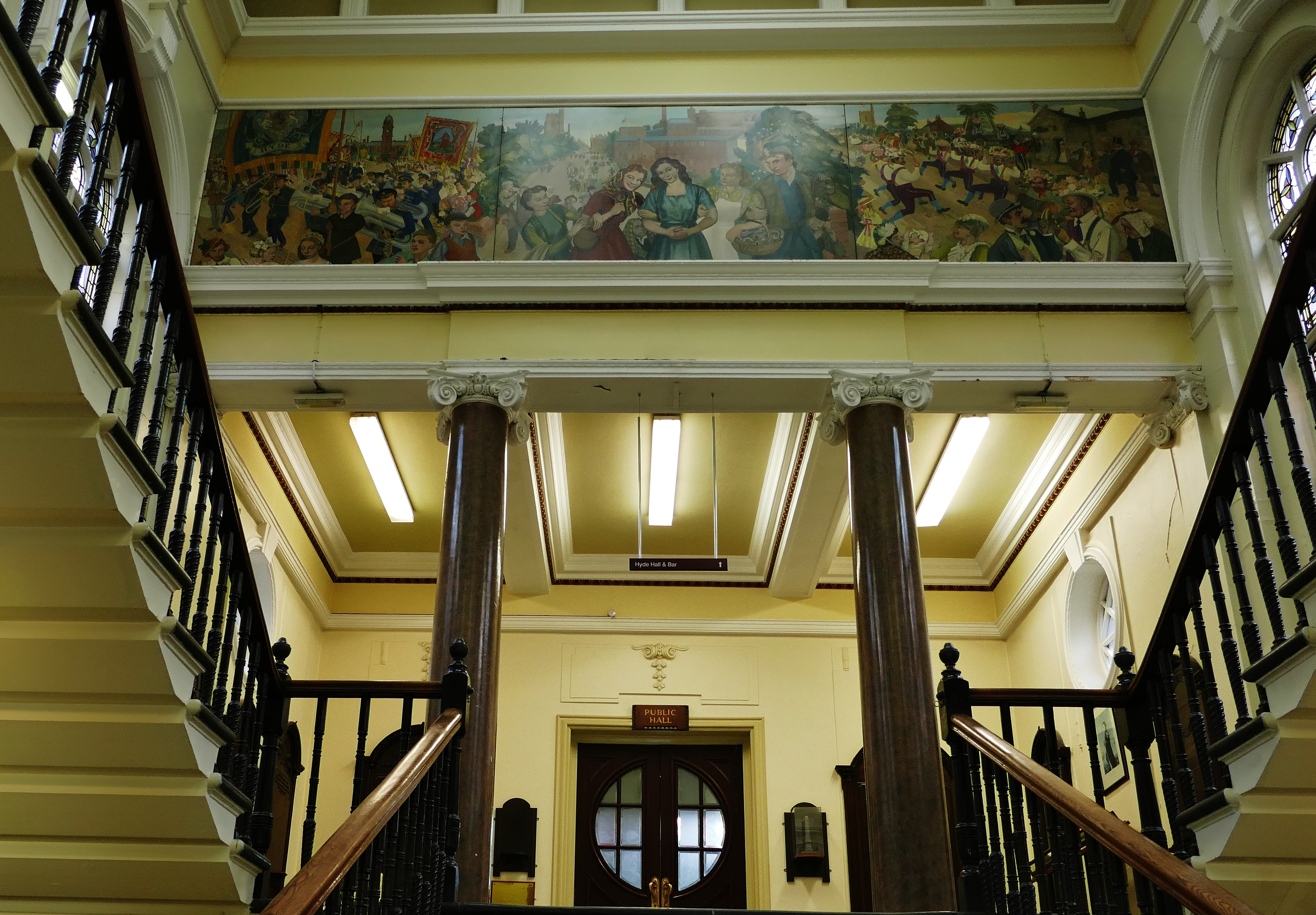
The mural by Harry Rutherford inside the building

After significant industrial growth in the 19th century, particularly in relation to the cotton industry, Hyde became a municipal borough in 1881. Civic leaders decided to procure a town hall: the site they selected had previously been occupied by Greenfield House, the former home of John Howard, a cotton mill owner who also owned Brereton Hall.

The foundation stone for the new building was laid by the mayor, Thomas Ashton, on 30 June 1883. It was designed by James William Beaumont in the neoclassical style, built in red brick with stone facings and was officially opened by the mayor, Edward Hibbert, on 27 June 1885. The design involved a symmetrical main frontage with eleven bays facing onto Market Street with the last two bays at each end projected forward as pavilions; the central section of seven bays featured a doorway with a fanlight flanked by pilasters and brackets supporting an entablature and a balcony; there was a window with an open pediment containing the borough coat of arms on the first floor and a clock tower with an octagonal dome above. On the first floor there was an oriel window between the two left hand end bays to illuminate the mayor's parlour and two more oriel windows in the central section on either side of the tower. The clock and the bells were a gift from the manager of a local cotton mill, Joshua Bradley; the clock was by Potts of Leeds and the four bells by Taylor of Loughborough. Internally, the principal rooms were the council chamber, the mayor's parlour and a large public hall.

After 23 miners were killed in an explosion at Hyde Colliery in January 1889, the town hall was the venue for the subsequent inquiry held into the disaster in February 1889. A large extension to the rear, which incorporated a police station, a courtroom and additional offices, was completed in 1913.

A mural depicting local scenes painted by the local artist, Harry Rutherford, was installed across the top of a beam above the main staircase at the time of the Festival of Britain in the 1951. The town hall continued to serve as the headquarters of Hyde Borough Council for much of the 20th century but ceased to be the local seat of government when the enlarged Tameside Metropolitan Borough Council was formed in 1974.

In November 2002, a statue of two human figures designed by Stephen Broadbent was unveiled outside the building, commemorating the role of the Chartists in bringing about parliamentary reform, and, in May 2007, a statue of a seal designed by Castle Fine Arts was unveiled outside the building, commemorating the achievements of the Hyde Seal Swimming and Water Polo Club which dominated water polo and swimming in England in the early years of the 20th century. After a programme of refurbishment works, the local public library moved from Union Street into new accommodation in the town hall in March 2015.

== See also ==
- Listed buildings in Hyde, Greater Manchester
