= Bobby Morrison (footballer, born 1896) =

English footballer (1896–1974)

Personal information
- Full name: Robert Morrison
- Date of birth: 31 March 1896
- Place of birth: Hyde, England
- Date of death: 1974 (aged 78–79)
- Position: Wing-half

Senior career*
Years	Team	Apps	(Gls)
1914–1915	Hyde United		
1919–1920	Stalybridge Celtic		
1920–1921	Hyde United		
1922–1925	Stockport County	30	(0)
1925–1931	New Brighton	168	(4)
1931	Macclesfield		
Total		198	(4)
- * Club domestic league appearances and goals

Robert Morrison (31 March 1896 – 1974) was an English footballer who played in the Football League for New Brighton and Stockport County.
