= St George's Church, Hyde =

Coordinates: 53.4466°N 2.0788°W

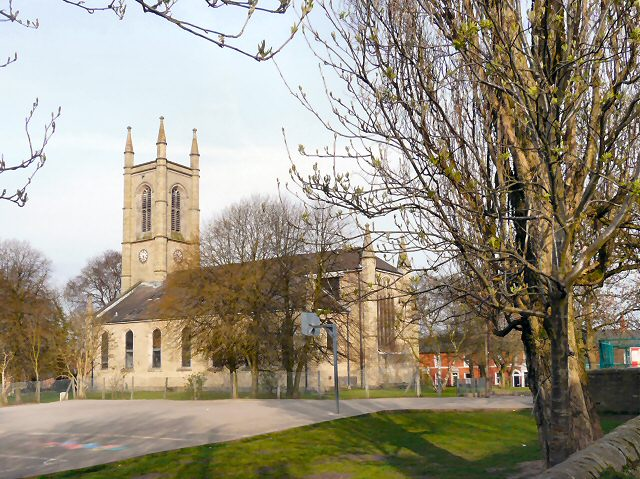
- St George's Church, Hyde, from the southeast

- Location in Greater Manchester
- OS grid reference: SJ 949 944
- Location: Church Street, Hyde, Greater Manchester
- Country: England
- Denomination: Church of England
- Website: https://www.achurchnearyou.com/church/12829/

History
- Status: Parish church
- Dedication: Saint George

Architecture
- Functional status: Active
- Heritage designation: Grade II
- Designated: 1 October 1985
- Architect(s): T. W. and C. Atkinson
- Architectural type: Church
- Style: Gothic Revival
- Groundbreaking: 1831
- Completed: 1832

Specifications
- Capacity: 250
- Materials: Stone, slate roof

Administration
- Province: York
- Diocese: Chester
- Archdeaconry: Macclesfield
- Deanery: Mottram
- Parish: St George, Hyde

Clergy
- Vicar: In Vacancy (from Sep. 2026)

St George's Church is on Church Street, Hyde, Greater Manchester, England. It is an active Anglican parish church in the deanery of Mottram, the archdeaconry of Macclesfield, and the diocese of Chester. The church is recorded in the National Heritage List for England as a designated Grade II listed building. It was a Commissioners' church, having received a grant towards its construction from the Church Building Commission.

== History ==
St George's was built in 1831–32 to a design by T. W. and C. Atkinson. A grant of £4,788 (equivalent to £460,000 in 2025) was given towards its construction by the Church Building Commission. It was originally a chapel of ease to St Mary's Church, Stockport. It became a parish church in 1842, with its ecclesiastical parish initially being the whole township of Hyde. A shallow chancel was added in 1882–83. The interior of the church was remodelled in 1885, the pulpit being moved from its previous central position, the seating was changed, and the organ was relocated. Considerable damage was done to the structure and furnishings of the church in the 1980s by dry rot.

== Architecture ==
The church is constructed in stone with a slate roof. Its architectural style is Gothic Revival. The plan consists of a seven-bay nave with north and south aisles, a single-bay chancel, and a west tower. The tower is in three stages and contains a west door above which is a four-light window. The middle stage contains circular clock faces, and in the upper stage are two-light bell openings. At the top of the tower is a coped parapet. On the corners of the tower, and at the corners of the body of the church, are octagonal columns rising to form pinnacles. Along the sides of the church are lancet windows. The east window has five lights. On the wall of the south aisle is a sundial. In 1838 a two-manual pipe organ by Samuel Renn was installed. This was rebuilt in 1912 by Ravensdale of Stockport, but is no longer in the church. There is a ring of eight bells, all cast in 1920 by John Taylor and Company of Loughborough.

== External features ==
Outside the church are two associated structures, both of which are listed at Grade II. At the entrance to the churchyard on the north side is a lychgate dated 1855. It consists of a stone base with octagonal stone piers and timber posts supporting a slate roof. The ridge of the roof consists of pierced tiles, and on the gables are cross finials. To the northwest of the church is a hearse house constructed in stone with a slate roof. Its keystone is inscribed with the date 1841 and a skull and crossbones. The churchyard contains memorial headstones commemorating six soldiers of World War I who buried in it, but whose graves are not individually marked.

== List of vicars ==
The list of vicars of St George's church, Hyde since the church was built in 1832; source:

- Herbert Allkin (1832–1849)
- Alexander Read (1849–1875)
- William H. Lowder, M.A. (1875–1888)
- William G. Bridges, M.A. (1888–1906)
- John A. Davys, M.A. (1906–1916)
- Harold J. Graham, M.A. (1916–1931)
- Frederic C. Sellar, M.A. (1932–1933)
- Edward V. Dawson, B.A. (1933–1942)
- Thomas A. Parker, L.TH. (1942–1955)
- Duncan Baird (1955–1967)
- L. Roy Lawrence, M.A. (1968–1975)
- Michael W. Walters, BSc (1975–1982)
- Geoffery H. Greenough, B.A. B.D. (1982–1987)
- John H. Darch, M.A. (1988–1999)
- T. S. McCabe, BSc (2000)
- Steven J. Wilson, Btech (2000–2010)
- Joanna C. Parker, M.A. (2011–2017)
- Jeremy Bentliff (2018–2026)

== See also ==
- Listed buildings in Hyde, Greater Manchester
- List of churches in Greater Manchester
- List of Commissioners' churches in Northeast and Northwest England
