= Werneth Low =

Hill in Greater Manchester, England

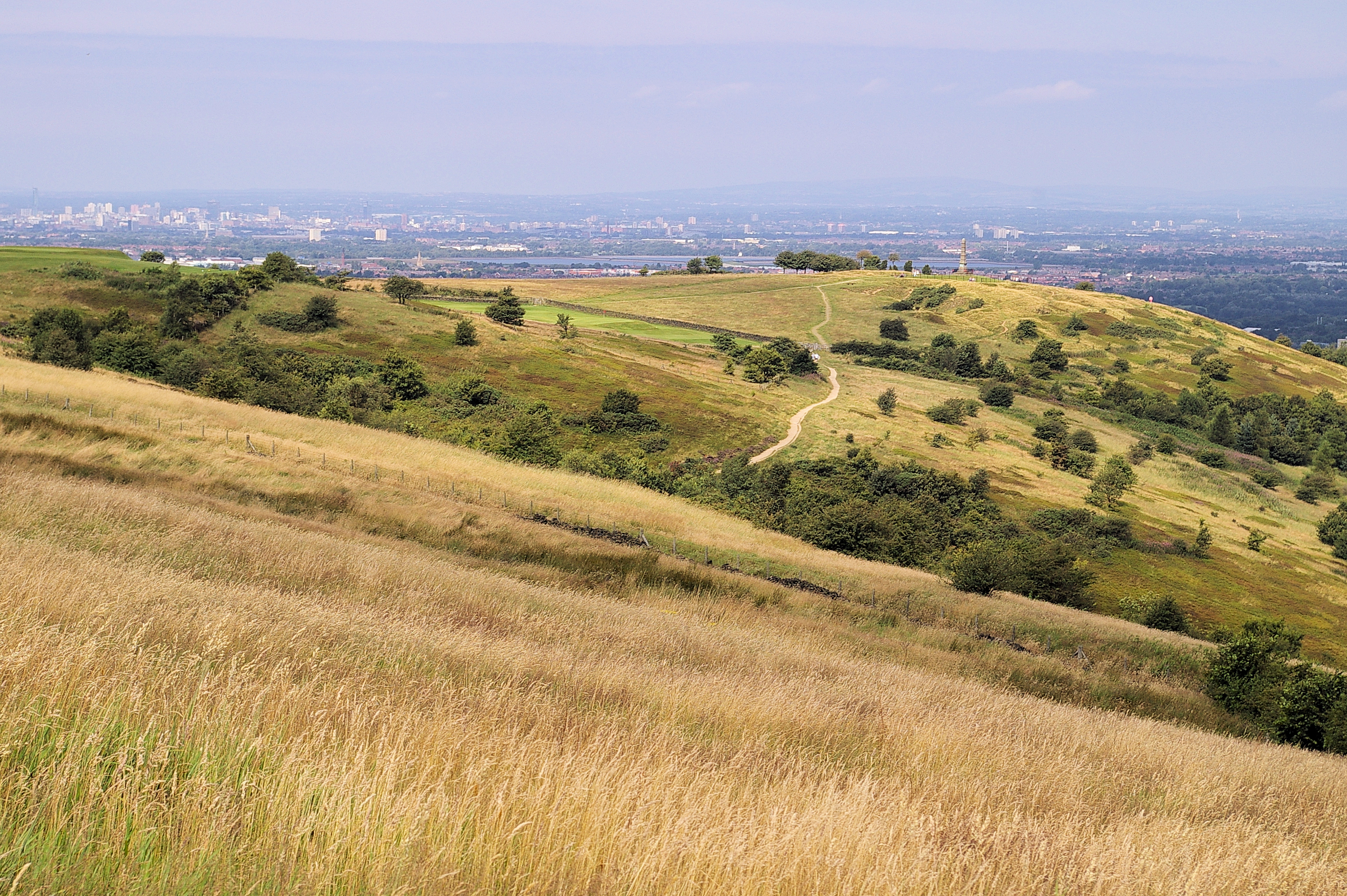
- Werneth Low, showing the cenotaph, and the Greater Manchester Built-up Area in the background, 2007

Highest point
- Elevation: 279 m (915 ft)
- Prominence: c. 112 m (367 ft)
- Coordinates: 53°26′1.57″N 2°3′14.94″W

Geography
- Location within Greater Manchester
- Location: Greater Manchester, England
- Parent range: Pennines
- OS grid: SJ968930
- Topo map: OS Landranger 109

Werneth Low (/ˈwɜːrnɛθ/; WUR-nəth) is a hill in Greater Manchester, England, and a part of the Pennines. It is located on the border of Stockport and Tameside, rising to a height of 279 metres (915 ft). The villages of Woodley, Greave, Gee Cross, Mottram and Romiley lie on the sides of the low.

The term "low" does not refer to any lack of altitude, it being a northern English word for hill.

Werneth Low offers panoramic views over the Greater Manchester Urban Area and, in clear weather, the Winter Hill transmitting station can be seen from here. To the south, Stockport town centre, part of Wythenshawe in south Manchester and the Welsh mountains can be viewed in clear weather.

The majority of Werneth Low is administered jointly by Hyde War Memorial Trust and Tameside Council. The trust organises the Remembrance and Peace day services. It was established to be the guardian of Werneth Low, to keep it "For the people of Hyde" and provide a lasting monument to the 710 men of Hyde who perished in World War I.

Various landmarks can be seen from the top of Werneth Low, including Manchester's Deansgate Square and Beetham Tower, the Oldham Civic Centre, Jodrell Bank Observatory's radio telescope (visible from the south-western end of the hilltop), and Manchester Airport.

== History ==
A flint knife and a Bronze Age stone mace head have been discovered on Werneth Low. Hangingbank is the site of a possible Iron Age farmstead dating to the first millennium BC, enclosed by a double ditch and featuring crop marks. A Roman road from Melandra to Astbury probably crosses the hill, however the exact course has not been identified. The site covers 1.23 hectares (3.0 acres). There is also evidence of Romano-British activity on Werneth Low; a sherd of Roman pottery dating to the 2nd century AD was discovered in the material filling one of the ditches at Hangingbank, indicating that was when the site fell out of use. There is a possible temporary Roman camp and excavations have recovered a posthole. The name Werneth derives from the Welsh verno for alder meaning 'the place where alders grow'.

The Higham family owned the land from at least 1330 and it is from them that the upper and lower Higham Farms take their name. In 1920, Lower Higham Farm and all of its land was purchased by the War Memorial Committee of the Hyde Borough Council and, in 1921, Hyde's main war memorial was officially unveiled. Being dedicated to remembering and being diligent about the 710 men who lost their lives for Hyde's wellbeing. A Royal Observer Corps monitoring post was active here from 1962 to 1968, which was intended to give warning of hostile aircraft and nuclear attacks on the United Kingdom. In the late 1980s, Greater Manchester Council, Tameside Metropolitan Borough Council and the Hyde War Memorial Trust worked together to establish Werneth Low country park, which covers 80 hectares (200 acres); the park was officially opened in 1980.

== Transport ==
Werneth Low was served by bus number 304 on Mondays, Wednesdays and Saturdays only. With effect from 31 January 2010, the Greater Manchester Passenger Transport Executive diverted this bus onto routes on which other bus services run and, as a result, Werneth Low is no longer served by any form of public transport.

== Gallery ==
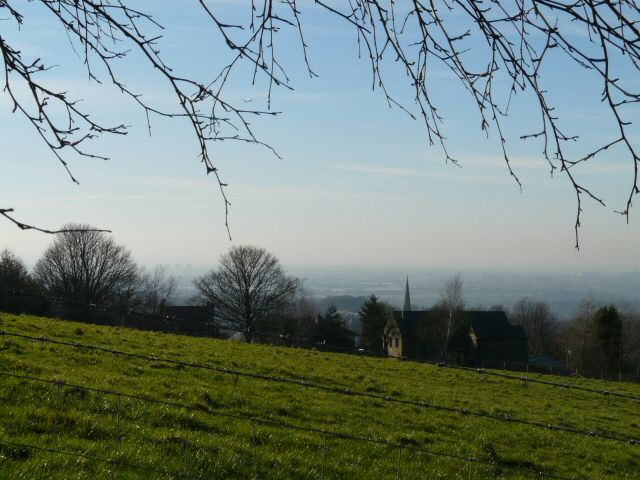
Croft Field with Werneth Low's visitors' centre in the background

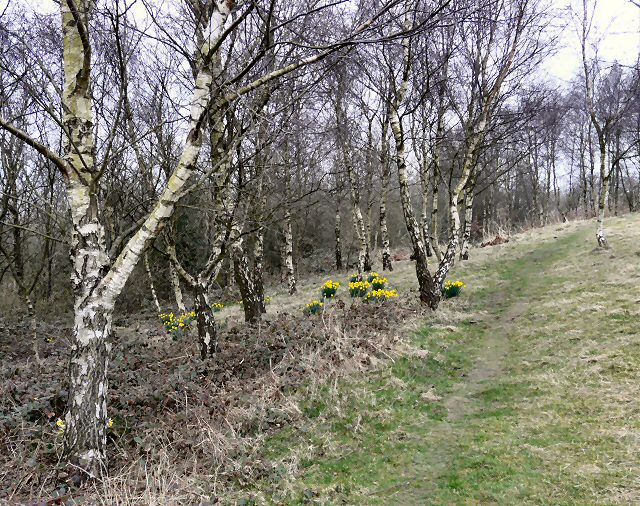
Woodland near Hanging Bank

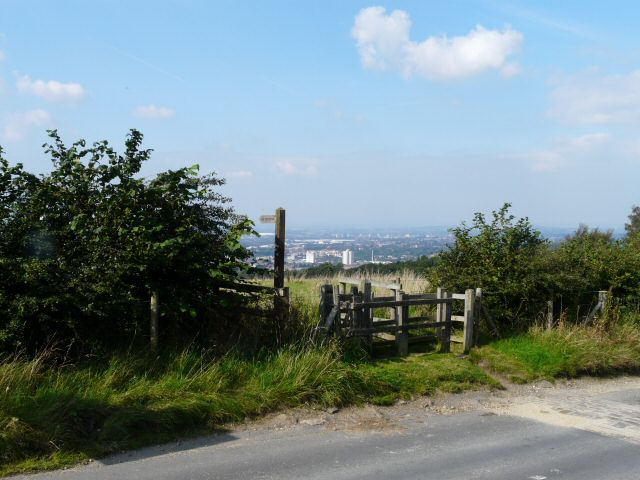
From Higham Lane looking north

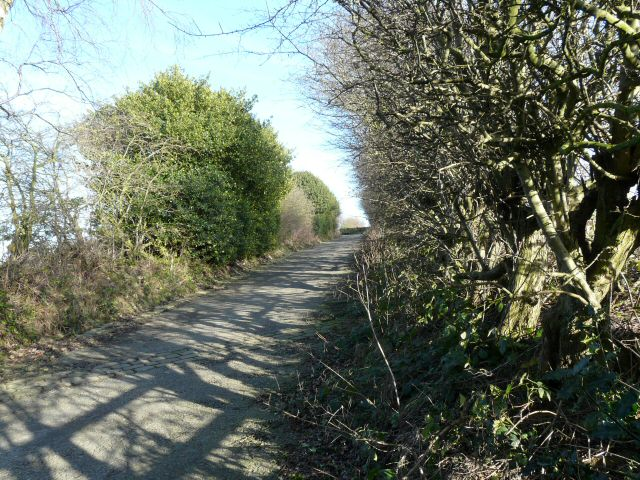
Footpath to Hanging Bank

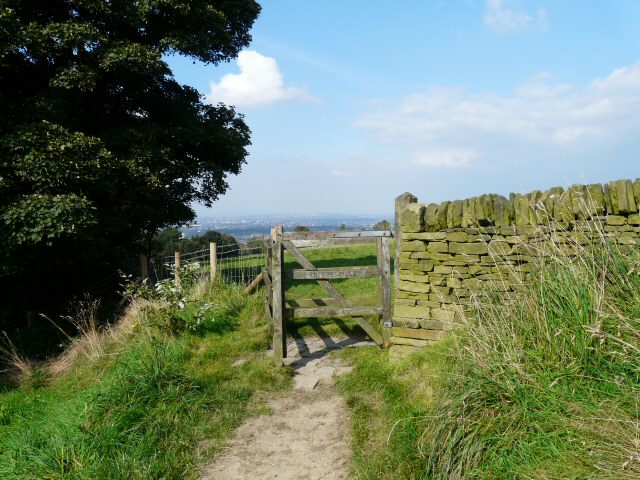
Gate to Rye Field

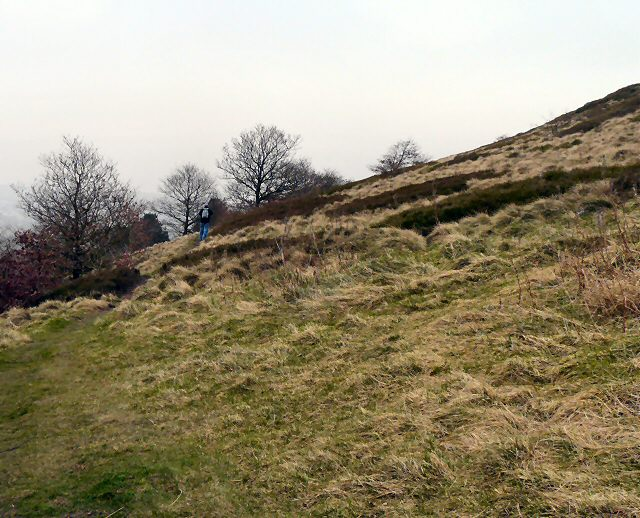
Werneth Low's Hanging Bank

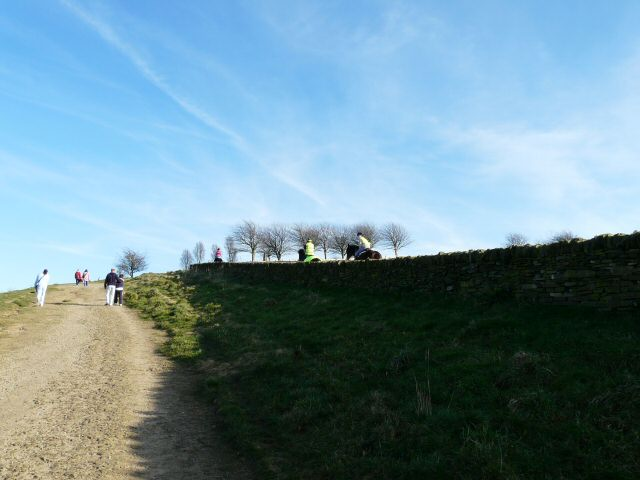
Towards the top of Hacking Knife

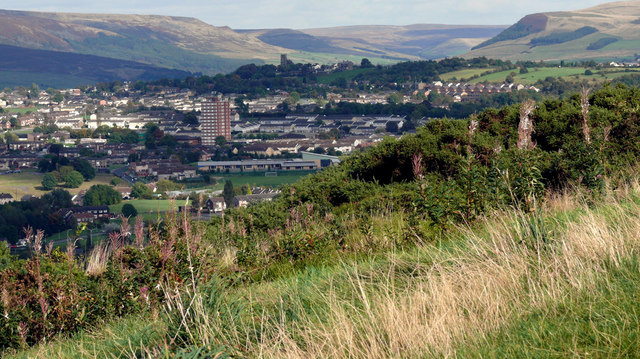
Looking east from Werneth Low towards Mottram with the hills of the Peak District in the background

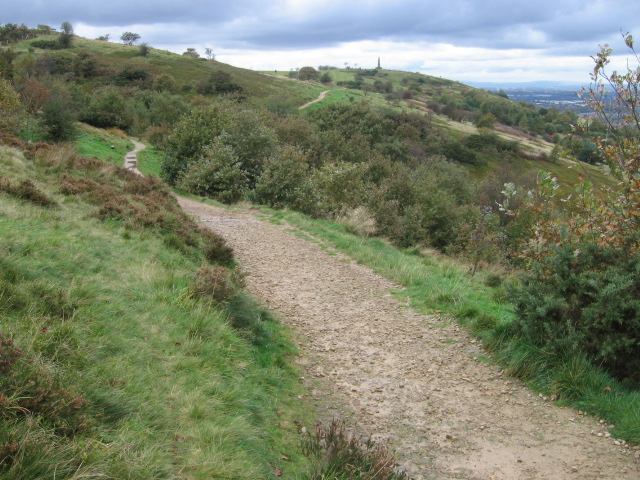
Looking west along the Low, with the Hyde Cenotaph in the background

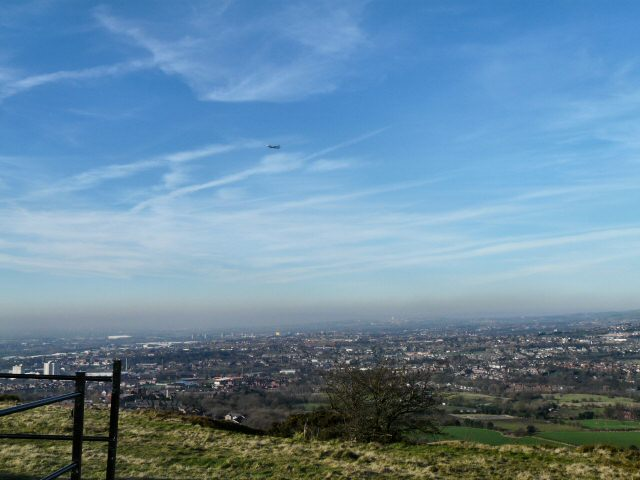
Looking north from Werneth Low across Tameside and Oldham

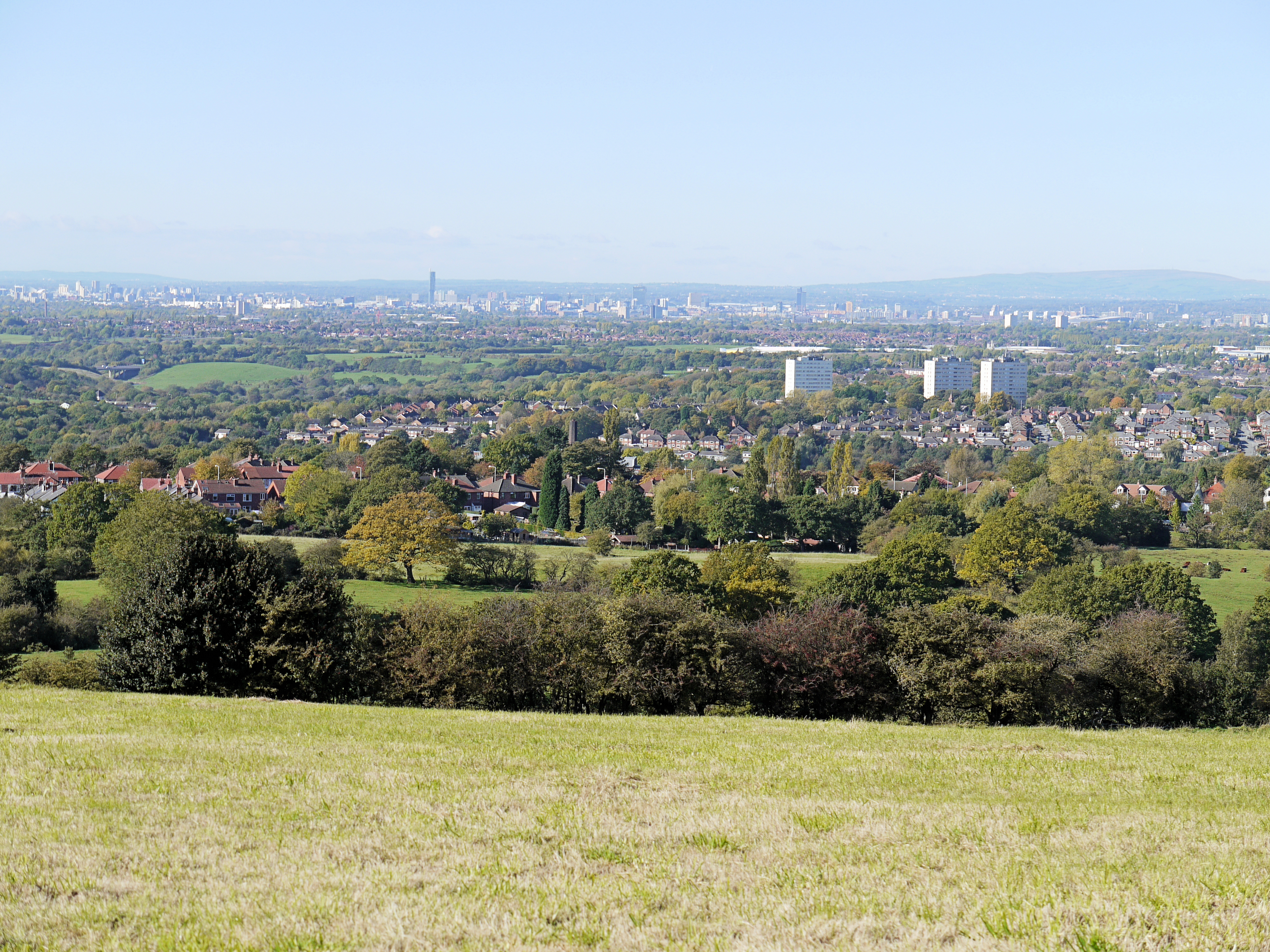
Looking north-west from Werneth Low towards Manchester city centre

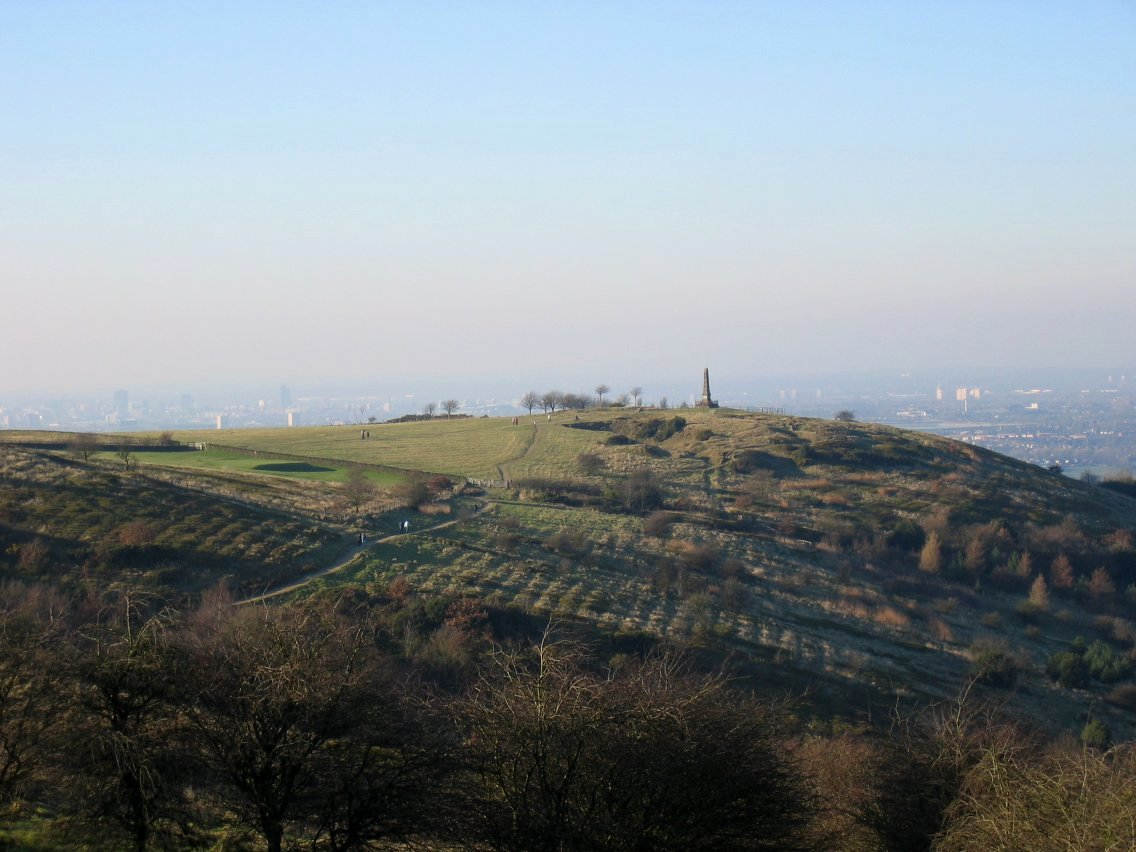
Looking north-west along the top of the Low

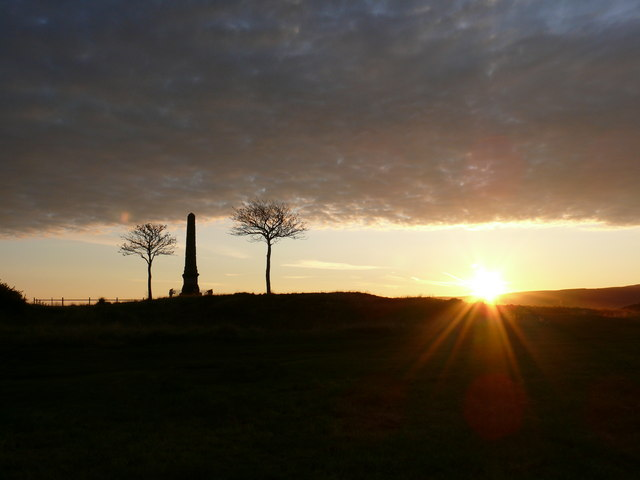
Sunrise from the top of Werneth Low
