= Alder Community High School =

Location
- Mottram Old Road, Gee Cross, Hyde, SK14 5NJ; England; 53.4416°N 2.0604°W

Information
- Type: Community school
- Religious affiliation: Mixed
- Local authority: Tameside
- Department for Education URN: 134283 Tables
- Ofsted: Reports
- Head teacher: Michelle Critchlow
- Gender: Mixed
- Enrolment: 800 (Approx)
- Website: http://www.aldercommunityhighschool.org.uk/

Alder Community High School is a secondary school in Hyde, Greater Manchester, England. The School was built under the Private Funding Initiative (PFI) by Interserve, a major government investment programme designed to bring Britain's secondary schools into the 21st Century. It has around 800 pupils. It is a computing and maths specialist school. The school was opened on the 1st April 2003.

== Building ==
The school building was constructed on the site of a former large field area. The school also owns an Artificial Turf pitch located adjacent to the road leading to the main school entrance and car park.
