= Hyde, Greater Manchester =

Town in Tameside, Greater Manchester, England

Coordinates: 53.4474°N 2.0820°W

Hyde
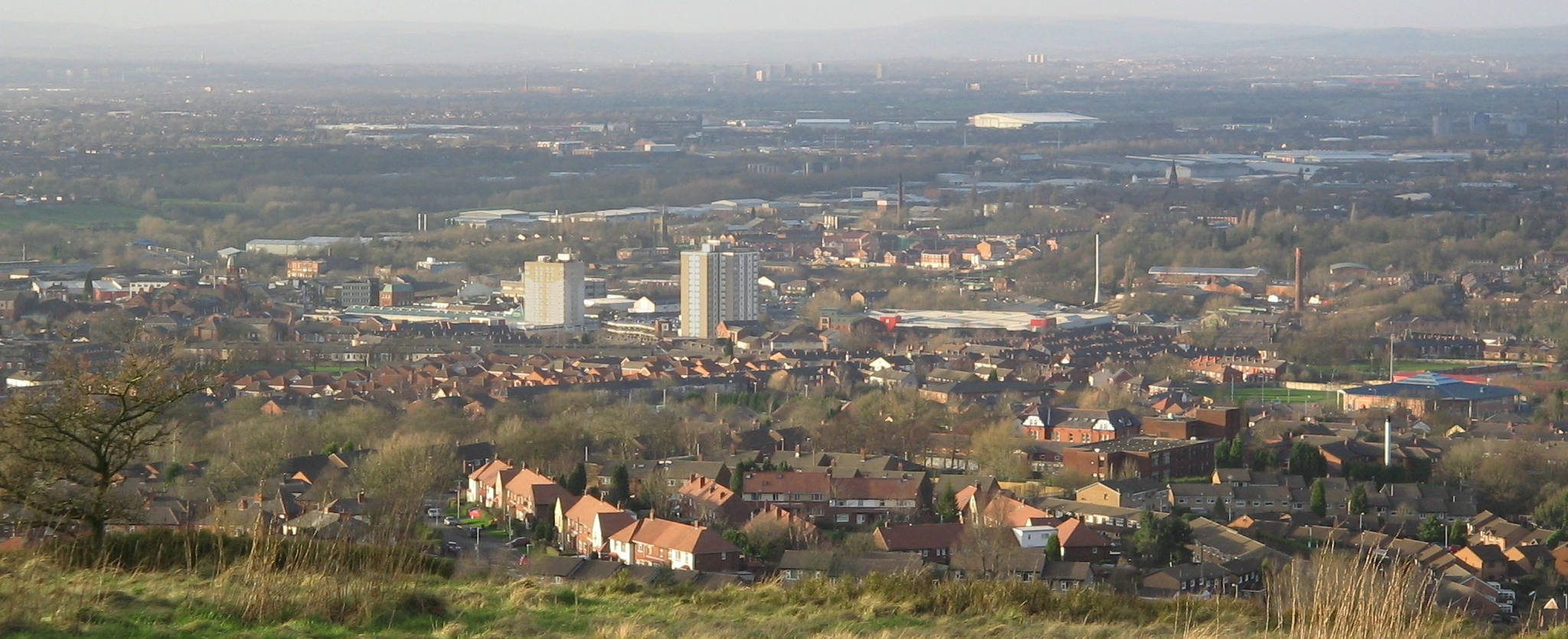
- Hyde from Werneth Low

- Location within Greater Manchester
- Population: 35,895 (Built-up area, 2021)
- OS grid reference: SJ945945
- Metropolitan borough: Tameside
- Metropolitan county: Greater Manchester
- Region: North West
- Country: England
- Sovereign state: United Kingdom
- Post town: HYDE
- Postcode district: SK14
- Dialling code: 0161
- Police: Greater Manchester
- Fire: Greater Manchester
- Ambulance: North West
- UK Parliament: Stalybridge and Hyde

Hyde is a town in Tameside, Greater Manchester, England. It lies within the historic county boundaries of Cheshire, and became part of Greater Manchester in 1974. The built-up area as defined by the Office for National Statistics had a population of 35,895 at the 2021 census. The town lies 5 miles (8 km) north-east of Stockport, 6 miles (10 km) west of Glossop and 6.5 miles (10 km) east of Manchester.

== Toponymy ==
The name Hyde is derived from the hide, a measure of land for taxation purposes, taken to be that area of land necessary to support a peasant family. In later times, it was taken to be equivalent to 120 acres (49 ha).

== History ==
=== Early history ===
Newton Hall was present in the thirteenth century. Hyde was a township in the parish of Stockport. In the late 18th century, the area that was to become the town centre was no more than a cluster of houses known as Red Pump Street. Gee Cross to the south was the larger settlement at that time, with Hyde being primarily the estates of Hyde Hall on the banks of the River Tame. At the 1801 census, the Hyde township had a population of 1,063. The modern town is largely a creation of the 19th century and the Industrial Revolution.

=== Industrial Revolution ===
The Peak Forest Canal was constructed through Hyde, being completed in 1800. It runs from Ashton-under-Lyne to Woodley, Romiley and Marple. Captain Clarke's Bridge, originally named Wood End Canal Bridge, is situated at the end of Woodend Lane. The bridge was erected before Captain Clarke rose to prominence and therefore probably became known as Captain Clarke's Bridge after he retired and resided there.

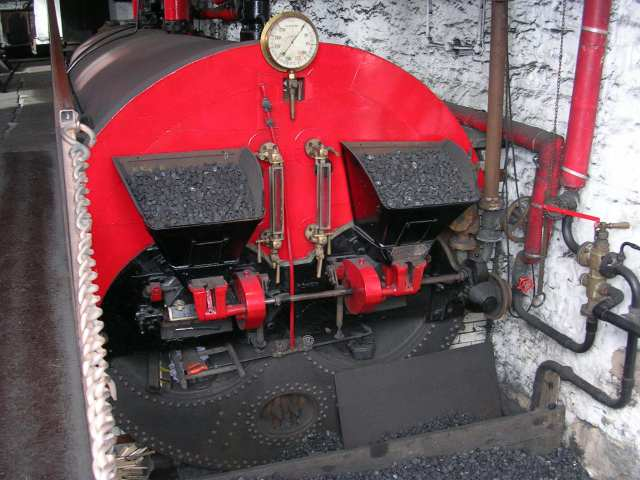
Lancashire boiler built by Tinker, Shenton & Co, Hyde installed at Queen Street Mill Textile Museum, Burnley

The population of Hyde increased due to the success of the cotton mills during the Industrial Revolution of the late 18th and early 19th centuries; at one stage, there were 40 working mills. By 1872, only 27 remained; half of the remaining mills closed between 1921 and 1939 and there is only one working mill in the town today. There were many mill-owning families, including Sidebotham, Hibbert and Horsfield. The main employers in the mills were the Ashton family, who successfully ran a combined spinning and weaving company; most mills concentrated on one process only. The Ashton family built Hyde Chapel, on Stockport Road in Gee Cross. The Ashton Brothers' Mill has been demolished recently to make way for a housing estate.

St George's Church was built in 1832 as a chapel of ease to St Mary's, Stockport. It was built at the instigation of John Hyde Clarke of Hyde Hall and was the first Church of England place of worship in the town; St George's became a parish church in 1842, with its ecclesiastical parish initially covering the whole township of Hyde. Later additions include the lychgate, boathouse by the canal, hearse house, parish rooms and numerous vicarages. The church has a 110-foot (34 m) tower housing eight bells and a clock.

Newton for Hyde railway station opened in 1841 on the Sheffield, Ashton-under-Lyne and Manchester Railway. It was in the neighbouring township of Newton, 0.6 miles (1 km) north-east of the Market Place in Hyde. Hyde Central railway station, closer to the town centre, was opened in 1858 on a branch line.

In 1853, construction work on the Catholic St Paul's Church in Hyde began. On 21 June 1854, the church was opened. It was designed by the noted architects Matthew Ellison Hadfield, John Grey Weightman and George Goldie in the Gothic Revival style. In 2013, it was designated a Grade II listed building.

Hyde Colliery was a coal mine in the town; in January 1889, an explosion there killed 23 miners. There was an inquiry held the following month at Hyde Town Hall. The following month, Ardwick AFC (now Manchester City) played Newton Heath (now Manchester United) under floodlights at Belle Vue to raise money for the victims' families. The game was watched by 10,000 people and this was the first floodlit match played by either side.

=== 20th century ===
During the 1960s, Myra Hindley and Ian Brady were arrested in their home on the Hattersley estate in Hyde after police found the body of 17-year-old Edward Evans in the house. At their trial, they were found guilty of murdering Evans as well as two other children whose bodies were found buried on Saddleworth Moor several miles away.

Britain's most prolific serial killer, Dr Harold Shipman, had his doctor's surgery in the town where he murdered most of his several hundred victims. The first known victim was 86-year-old Sarah Hannah Marsland of Ashton House in Victoria Street on 7 August 1978 and the last was Kathleen Grundy of Joel Lane on 24 June 1998.

=== 21st century ===
On 18 September 2012, drug dealer Dale Cregan made a hoax emergency call to the police from an address in Mottram in Longdendale, luring police constables Nicola Hughes, 23, and Fiona Bone, 32, of Greater Manchester Police there by claiming that there had been an incident of criminal damage. When they arrived, he murdered them.

== Governance ==
There is one main tier of local government covering Hyde, at metropolitan borough level: Tameside Metropolitan Borough Council. The council is a member of the Greater Manchester Combined Authority, which is led by the directly-elected Mayor of Greater Manchester. There are three Tameside wards named after Hyde: Hyde Godley, Hyde Newton, and Hyde Werneth.

The three Hyde wards all lie within the Stalybridge and Hyde constituency for national elections. The town was previously included in the Hyde constituency, which was created in 1885 and abolished in 1918 when the Stalybridge and Hyde constituency was created.

=== Administrative history ===
Hyde was historically a township in the ancient parish of Stockport, which formed part of the Macclesfield Hundred of Cheshire. From the 17th century onwards, parishes were gradually given various civil functions under the poor laws, in addition to their original ecclesiastical functions. In some cases, including Stockport, the civil functions were exercised by each township separately rather than the parish as a whole. In 1866, the legal definition of 'parish' was changed to be the areas used for administering the poor laws, and so Hyde became a civil parish.

The Hyde township was also made a local government district in 1863, administered by an elected local board. The local government district was enlarged in 1877 to take in the neighbouring townships or civil parishes of Newton (also known as Newton Moor), Godley, and the part of Werneth north of the hill of Werneth Low, which area included the village of Gee Cross. The Hyde local government district was incorporated to become a municipal borough in 1881.

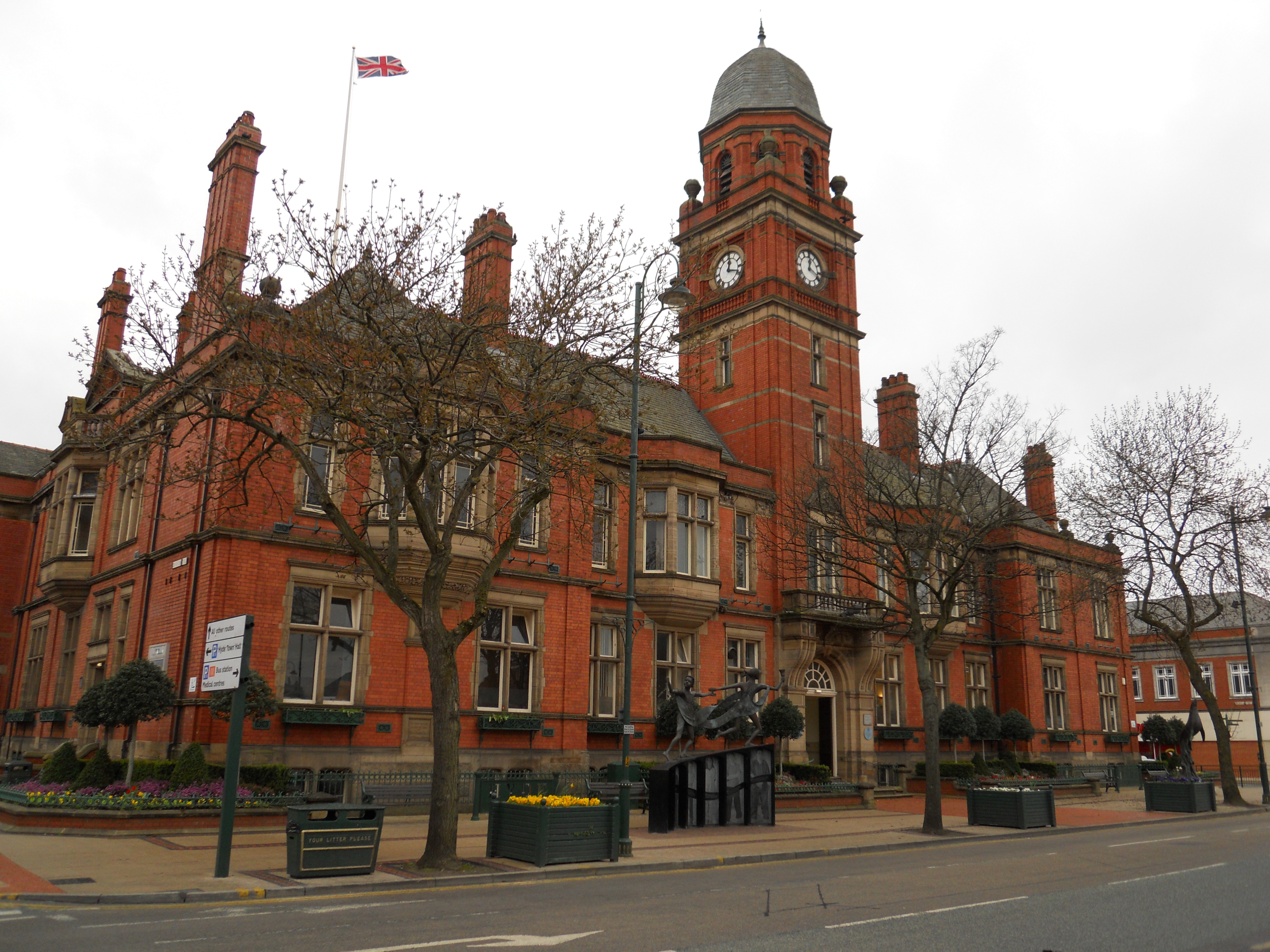
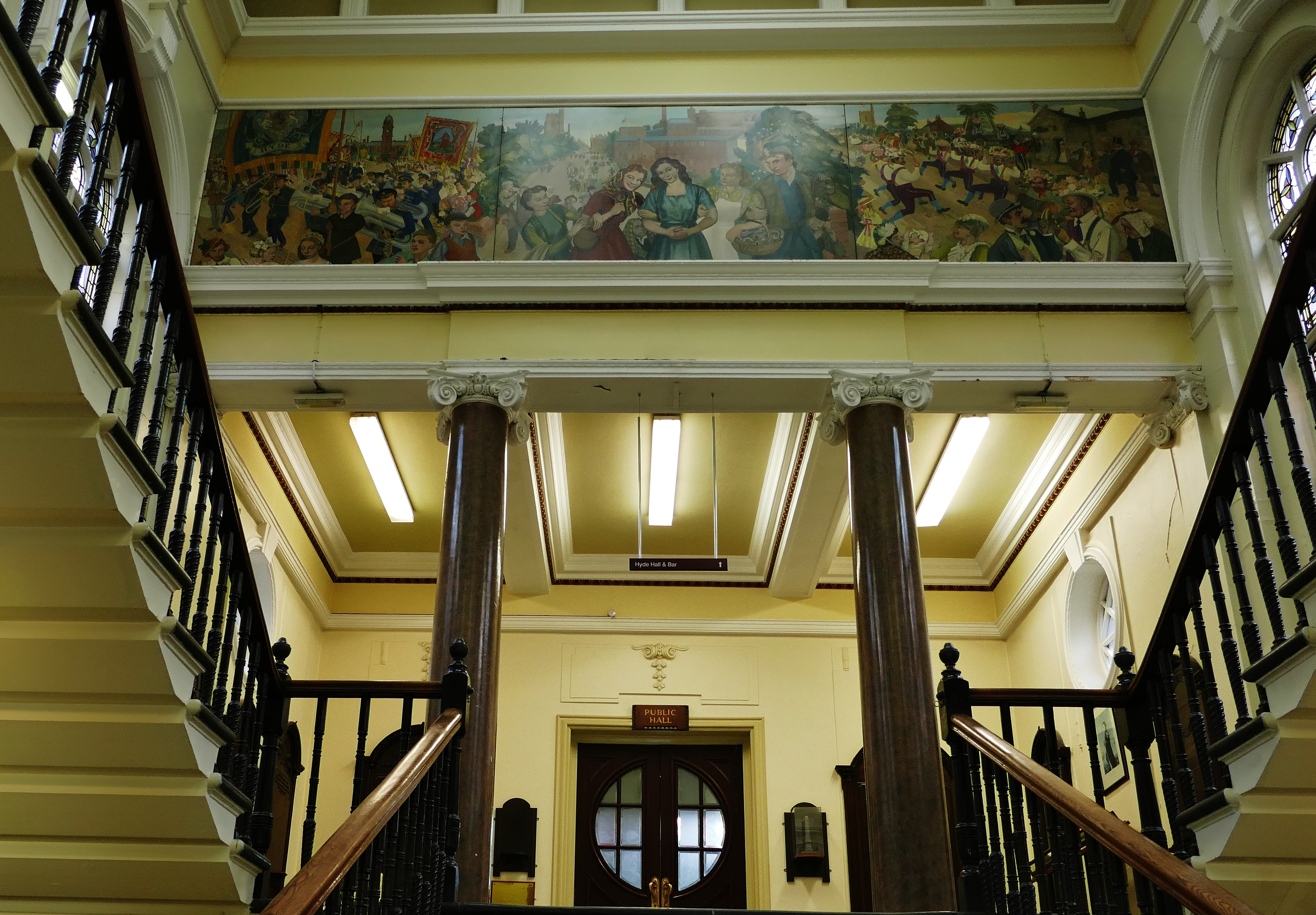
Hyde Town Hall (Exterior left; Interior right).

The borough council built Hyde Town Hall on Market Street, overlooking Market Place, to serve as its headquarters. The building was completed in 1885. The large bell in the clocktower is known as Owd Joss (Old Josh), on account of the clock and bells having been paid for by Joshua Bradley, who had been a child worker in the mills but later rose to be a factory manager and served as a councillor.

In 1894, the part of Werneth township within the borough was added to the parish of Hyde. The borough then comprised the three urban parishes of Hyde, Godley and Newton until 1923, when they were merged into a single parish of Hyde covering the whole borough. The borough was enlarged in 1936 to take in Hattersley and part of Matley from Tintwistle Rural District.

The borough of Hyde was abolished in 1974 under the Local Government Act 1972. The area became part of the Metropolitan Borough of Tameside in Greater Manchester.

== Geography ==
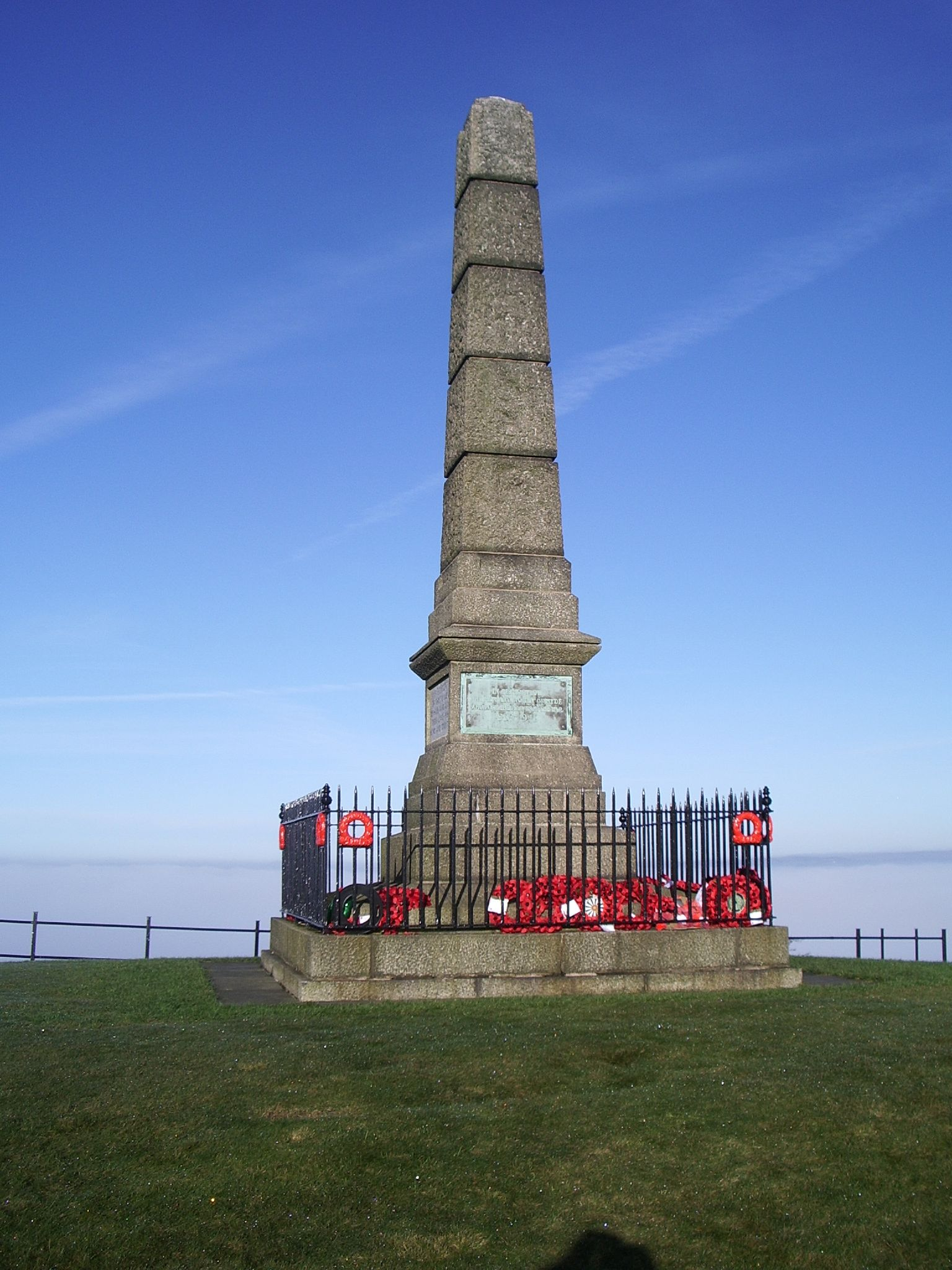
Hyde Cenotaph on Werneth Low

Werneth Low Country Park is the location of the Hyde War Memorial. The memorial is owned by a trust which raised funds from Hyde residents after the Great War to create a permanent memorial to those Hyde residents who died in that conflict. The memorial contains 710 names.

Hyde is separated from Denton by the River Tame, a tributary of the River Mersey. There are several areas and suburbs in Hyde, these include: Gee Cross, Newton, Hattersley, Godley, and Flowery Field.

== Transport ==
=== Buses ===
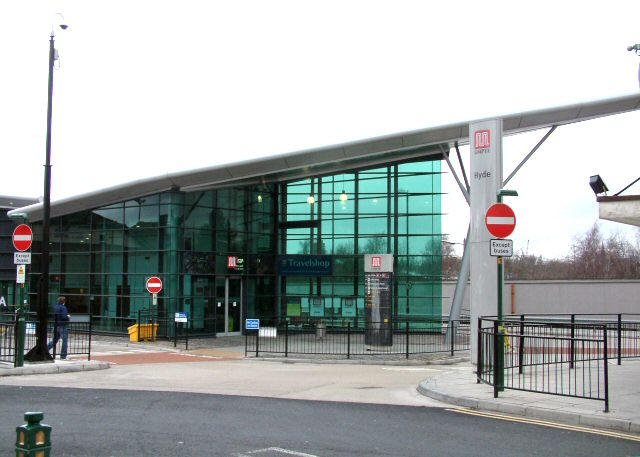
Hyde bus station

Local bus services are operated by Metroline Manchester, Go North West, Stagecoach Manchester and Diamond North West under the Bee Network. Routes connect the town with the Manchester city centre, Stockport, Dukinfield, Gee Cross, Woodley, Stalybridge, Ashton-under-Lyne and Oldham.

The bus station was originally built in the 1960s, with an open bus shelter design. It was rebuilt in 2007 as a much larger central terminus style building, enclosed from the outside; it opened on 23 August 2007 and cost £3.7m to build. The initiative was intended to encourage people to use public transport.

=== Railway ===
There are six railway stations in the Hyde area, with services operated by Northern Trains:

- Hyde Central and Hyde North stations are on the Hyde Loop line between Manchester Piccadilly and Rose Hill Marple;
- Flowery Field, Newton for Hyde, Godley and Hattersley stations are on the electrified Glossop line between Piccadilly, Glossop and Hadfield.

=== Roads ===
Hyde is served by the M67, which is a feeder to the M60 Manchester orbital motorway.

=== Trams ===
The nearest Metrolink station is in neighbouring Ashton-under-Lyne, which provides services to the city centre.

A tram network, operated by the SHMD Joint Board, ran lines through Hyde from 1904 to 1945, until their replacement by buses.

== Media ==
=== Television ===
Local news and television programmes are provided by BBC North West and ITV Granada. Television signals are received from the Winter Hill TV transmitter.

=== Radio ===
Local radio stations are BBC Radio Manchester on 95.1 FM, Capital Manchester and Lancashire on 102.0 FM, Heart North West on 105.4 FM, Smooth North West on 100.4 FM, Greatest Hits Radio Manchester & The North West on 96.2 FM, and Tameside Radio, a community based station which broadcast from its studios in Ashton-under-Lyne.

=== Newspapers ===
The local newspaper is the Tameside Reporter, published on Thursdays.

== Sport ==
=== Football ===
Ewen Fields the home of Hyde United F.C.

Hyde United F.C. was formed in 1919 and changed its name to Hyde FC in 2010, as a result of a sponsorship deal with Manchester City, and back to Hyde United in 2015. The club plays its home games at Ewen Fields. The ground has been used by Manchester City and Manchester United for their reserve team fixtures; in 2010, Manchester City F.C. Reserves and Academy moved in. They used the facility as their permanent home until 2015, when a purpose-built academy stadium was opened on the campus at the Etihad Stadium. A notable appearance for Hyde United F.C. was in the FA Cup - in the 2017–18 season, they made a first round appearance in the FA Cup where they lost 4–0 to Milton Keynes Dons FC.

The first club in the town, simply called Hyde F.C., was notable for suffering the biggest defeat in FA Cup history, losing 26–0 at Preston North End in 1887.

=== Boxing ===
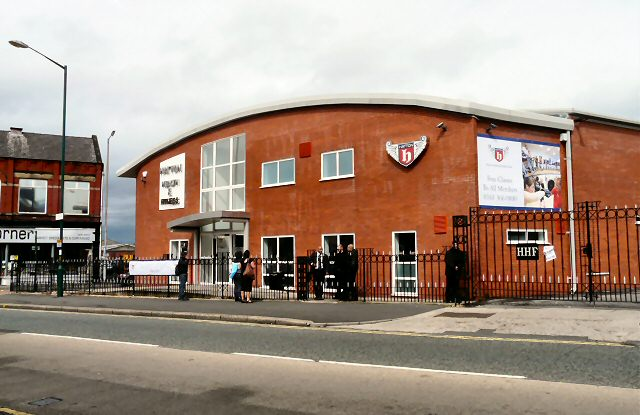
Ricky Hatton's gym, Hatton Health and Fitness, in Hyde

World champion boxer Ricky Hatton was brought up on the Hattersley Estate and lived in Gee Cross. He fought against Floyd Mayweather Jr. and Manny Pacquiao, but lost on both occasions. Overall his record is 45-3, and at one point was 43–0. His association with the town led to the creation of a boxing gym and health club by Hatton Promotions.

=== Water polo ===
The Hyde Seal Swimming & Water Polo Club dominated water polo and swimming in England in the early years of the 20th century. and were three times world water Polo champions.

=== Cricket ===
Hyde Cricket and Squash Club play in the Cheshire County League and have their ground near Werneth Low. Flowery Field Cricket Club are part of the Greater Manchester Cricket League. Professional cricketer Len Hopwood was born in Newton.

== Education ==
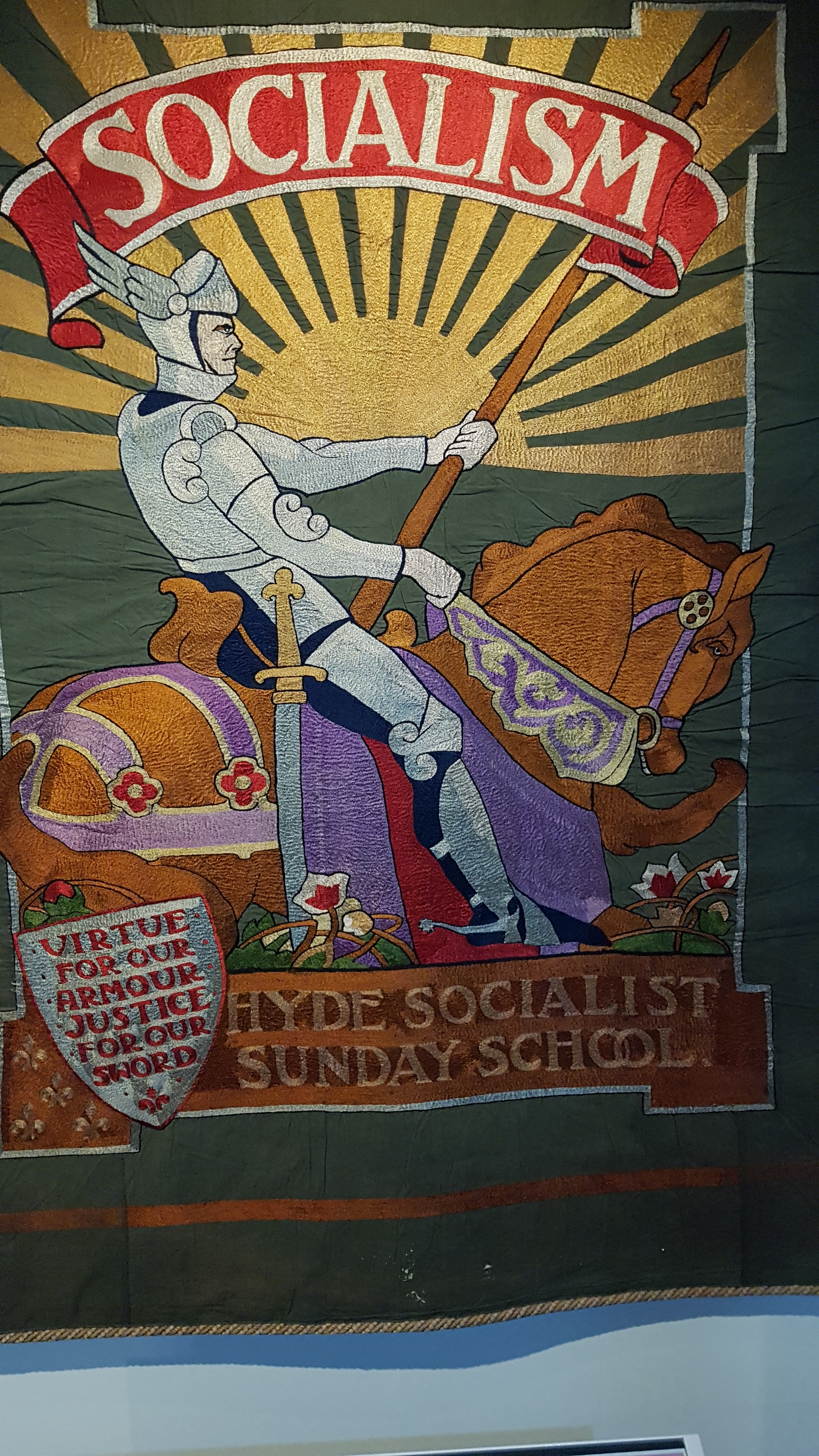
Hyde Socialist Sunday School

The secondary schools in the Hyde area are Alder Community High School and Hyde High School.

Tameside College and Clarendon Sixth Form College used to be located in Hyde but have since moved to Ashton-under-Lyne.

The historic Canterbury College of Business had a campus hall in Hyde until it relocated its facilities overseas.

== Leisure ==
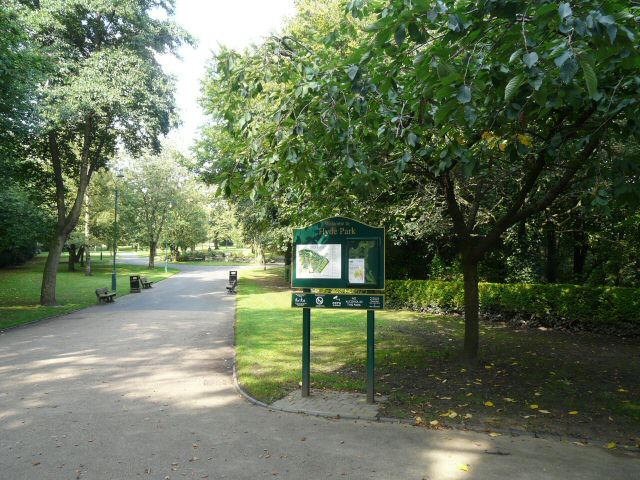
Hyde Park

Hyde's largest greenspace is Hyde Park, originally part of the Newton Lodge estate which was purchased by James Ashton circa 1620. The Ashton family were cotton mill owners and one of the two biggest employers in Hyde. The park was given to the Borough of Hyde by Eveline Mary Ashton and Amy Elizabeth Ashton in 1902 and opened to the public on 21 May 1904. The bandstand opened in 1922 and in 1938 Newton Lodge was demolished and replaced by Bayley Hall. The park features a garden of tranquillity, a children's play area and a rockery.

Hyde Market has been a shopping centre for centuries. In 1994, Clarendon Square Shopping Centre opened alongside the market. Outside the shopping centre is a children's carousel ride which celebrated its 100th birthday on 6 July 2019.

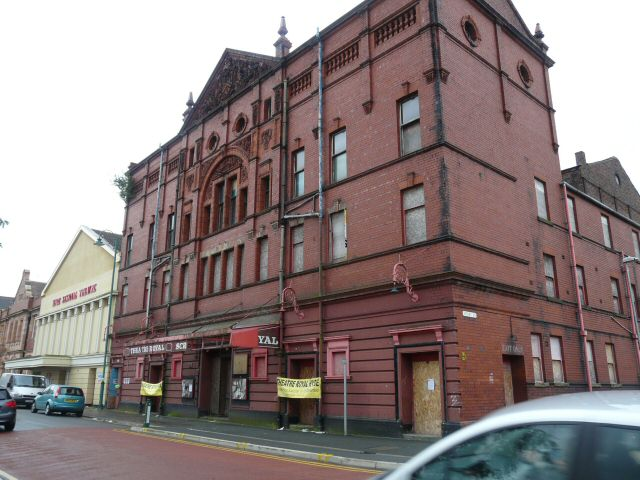
Theatre Royal, Hyde

Hyde's Festival Theatre is home to several local amateur groups presenting plays, music and dance in the downstairs auditorium or the upstairs smaller studio. There are occasional visiting professional shows.

Hyde leisure centre contains a large swimming pool with a wave machine, aqua slide and upstairs fitness suite. The octagon-shaped structure, which has been open since the 1990s, is next to Hyde United F.C.'s ground. Waldorf Playing Fields are adjacent to Matley Lane in Hyde.

Hyde also has an Air Cadet Organisation (ACO), No. 468 (Hyde & Hattersley) Squadron.

Hyde Library had a gallery exhibiting the work of Harry Rutherford, an artist from the Tameside area, now at Ashton-under-Lyne.

== Notable people ==
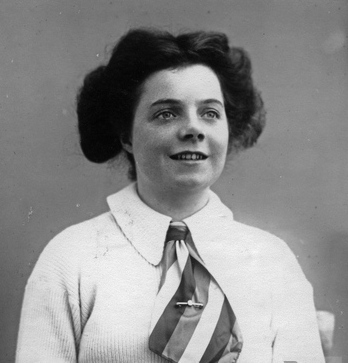
Margaret Hewitt, 1909

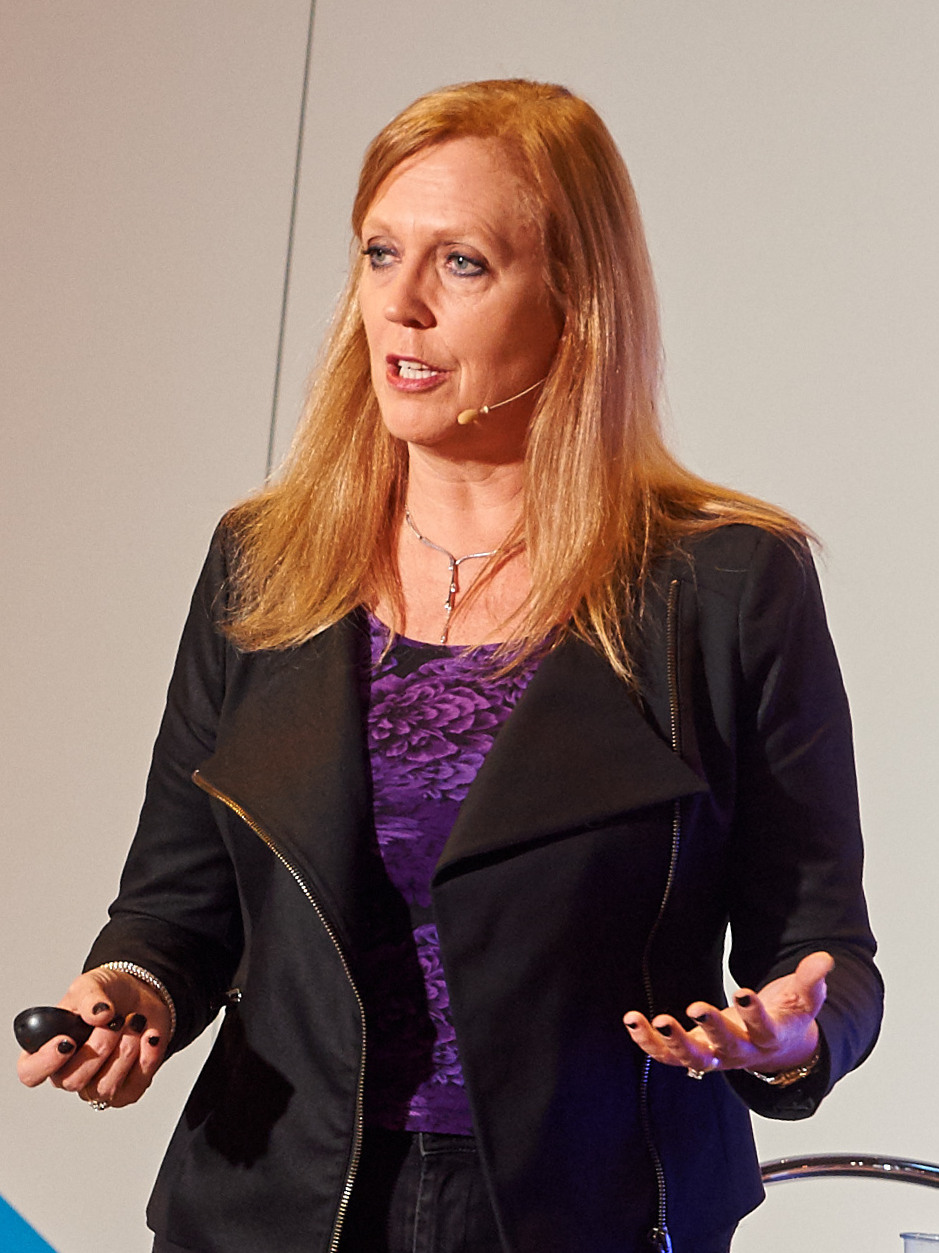
Jenny Campbell, 2015

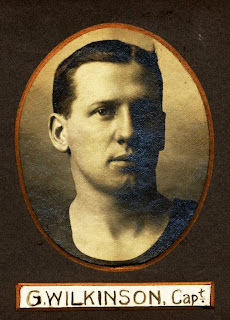
George Wilkinson, 1904

The following individuals were born in Hyde or lived in the town:

- Thomas Ashton (1818–1898), an English cotton manufacturer and philanthropist.
- Frances Burgess (1910–1993), the first woman to be crowned the national Cotton Queen in 1930.
- Margaret Hewitt (1889-1972), suffragette employed by the Women's Social and Political Union.
- Stuart Hall (born 1929), former BBC radio and TV presenter & convicted sex offender.
- Kenneth Horsfield (1920–1944), Manchester Regiment soldier, posthumously awarded the George Cross for "most conspicuous gallantry"
- The moors murderers - Ian Brady (1938-2017) & Myra Hindley (1942-2002), serial killers
- Harold Shipman (1946–2004), former General practitioner and serial killer
- Trevor Grimshaw (1947–2001), artist, portrayed the northern industrial town landscape as it used to be.
- Jenny Campbell (born 1961), former British banker and panelist on Dragons' Den
- John Bramwell (born 1964), singer-songwriter, lead singer of I Am Kloot
- Justin Moorhouse (born 1970), stand-up comedian, radio DJ and actor, raised locally
- Lucy Dixon (born 1989), actress, played Danielle Harker in the BBC One series Waterloo Road
- Luke Baines (born 1990), actor, singer and model

=== Sport ===
- George Wilkinson (1879–1946), water polo player, team gold medallist at 1908 and 1912 Summer Olympics
- Frank Knowles (1891–1951), footballer who played over 290 games including 162 for Hartlepool United
- Bobby Morrison (1896–1974), footballer who played 198 games including 168 for New Brighton A.F.C.
- Len Hopwood (1903–1985), a Lancashire cricketer who played 400 First-class cricket matches
- Nigel Howard (1925–1979), a Lancashire cricketer who played 198 First-class cricket matches
- Alan West (born 1951), footballer, played 387 games including 285 for Luton Town
- Ricky Hatton (1978-2025), former professional boxer; held multiple world light-welterweight championships
- Matthew Hatton (born 1981), former professional boxer; held the European welterweight title 2010/2011

== In popular culture ==
In fiction, Hyde is mentioned frequently in the BBC drama Life on Mars. In the programme, the character Sam Tyler was said to have transferred from C Division Hyde, to the City Centre, A Division CID. The choice of Hyde is given as a clue that his 1973 self is an alter ego, as in Robert Louis Stevenson's Strange Case of Dr Jekyll and Mr Hyde.

== See also ==
- Listed buildings in Hyde, Greater Manchester
