= 2016 in New Zealand =

- Decades: 1990s; 2000s; 2010s; 2020s
- See also: History of New Zealand; List of years in New Zealand; Timeline of New Zealand history

The following lists events that happened during 2016 in New Zealand.

== Population ==
National

Estimated populations as at 30 June.

- New Zealand total – 4,693,000
- North Island – 3,596,200
- South Island – 1,096,200

Main urban areas

Estimated populations as at 30 June.

- Auckland – 1,495,000
- Blenheim – 30,700
- Christchurch – 389,700
- Dunedin – 118,500
- Gisborne – 36,100
- Hamilton – 229,900
- Invercargill – 50,700
- Kapiti – 41,800
- Napier-Hastings – 131,000
- Nelson – 65,700
- New Plymouth – 56,800
- Palmerston North – 84,300
- Rotorua – 57,800
- Tauranga – 134,500
- Wellington – 405,000
- Whanganui – 39,600
- Whangārei – 56,400

== Incumbents ==
=== Regal and vice-regal ===
- Head of State – Elizabeth II
- Governor-General – Jerry Mateparae until 31 August, then Patsy Reddy from 28 September.
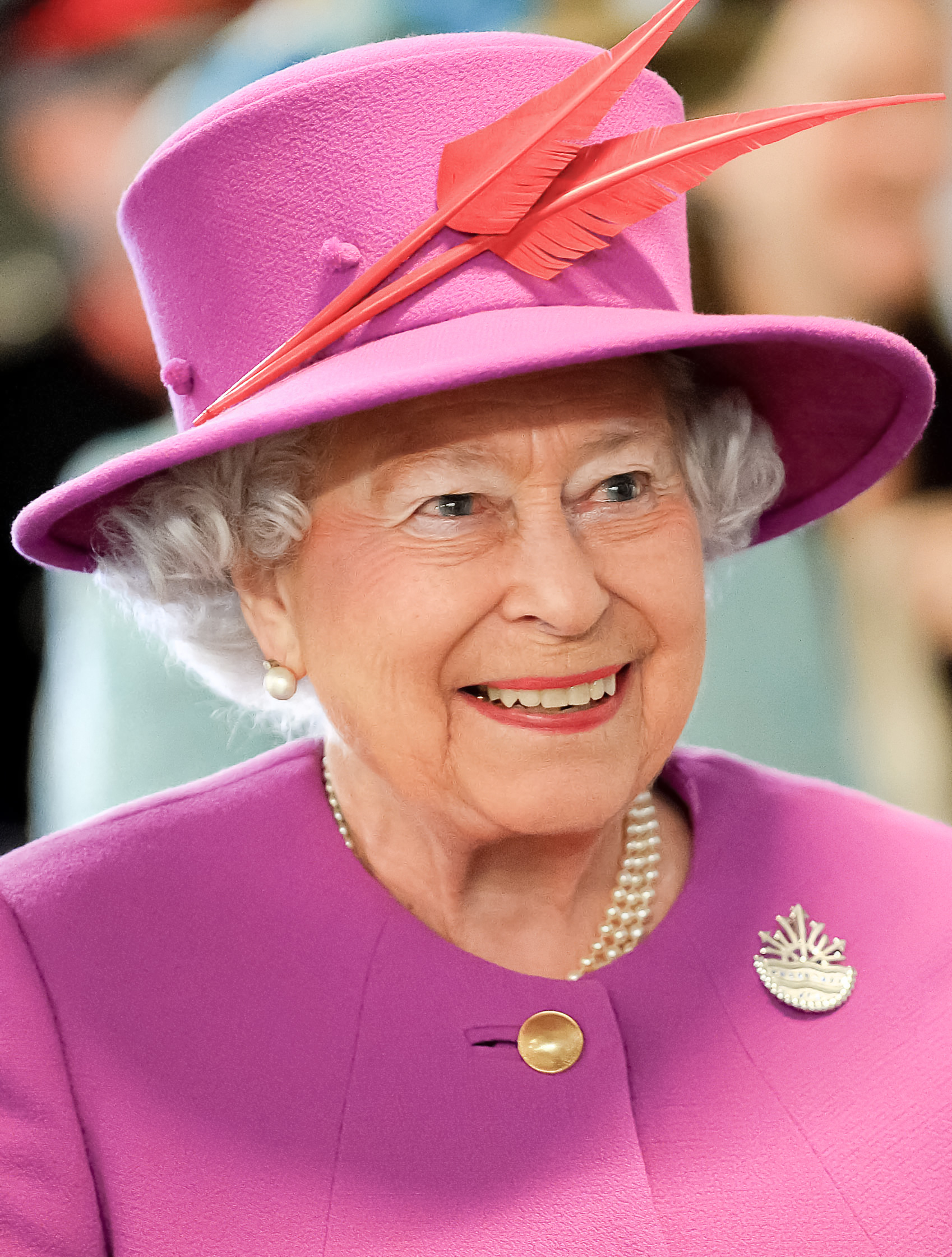
Elizabeth II

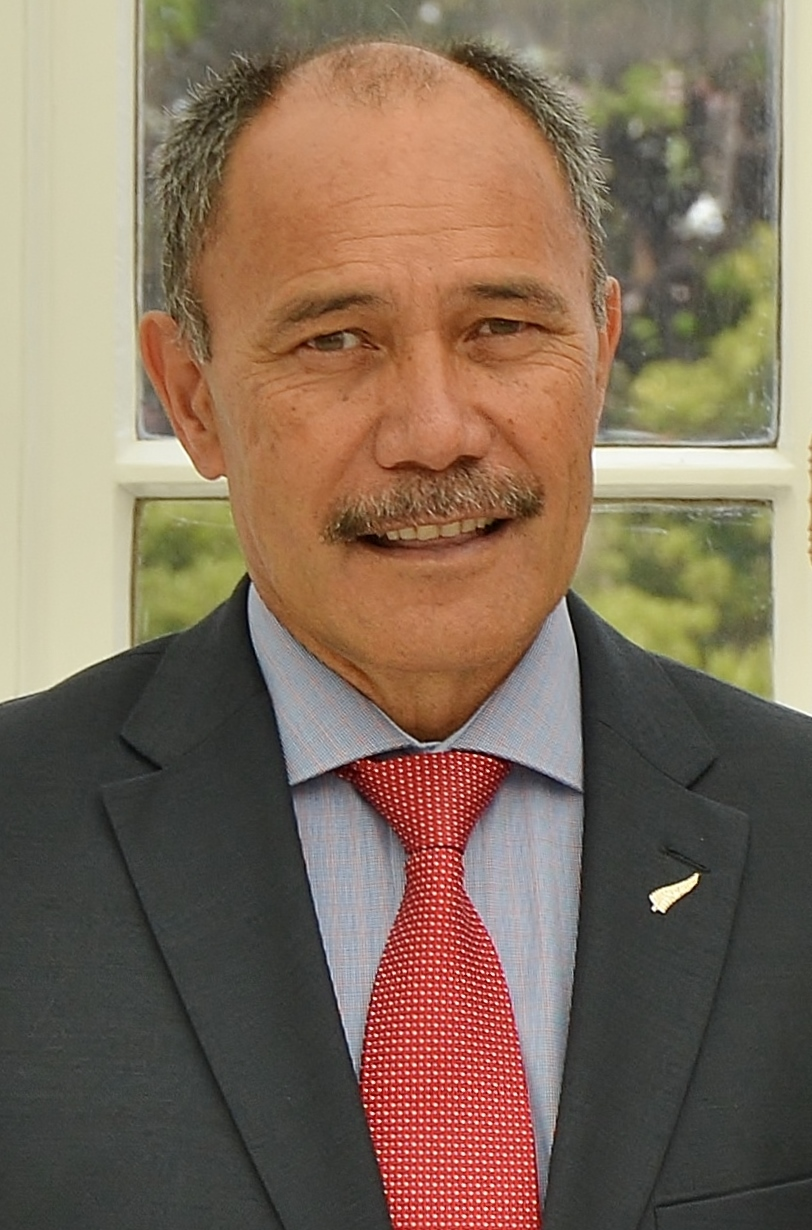
Jerry Mateparae

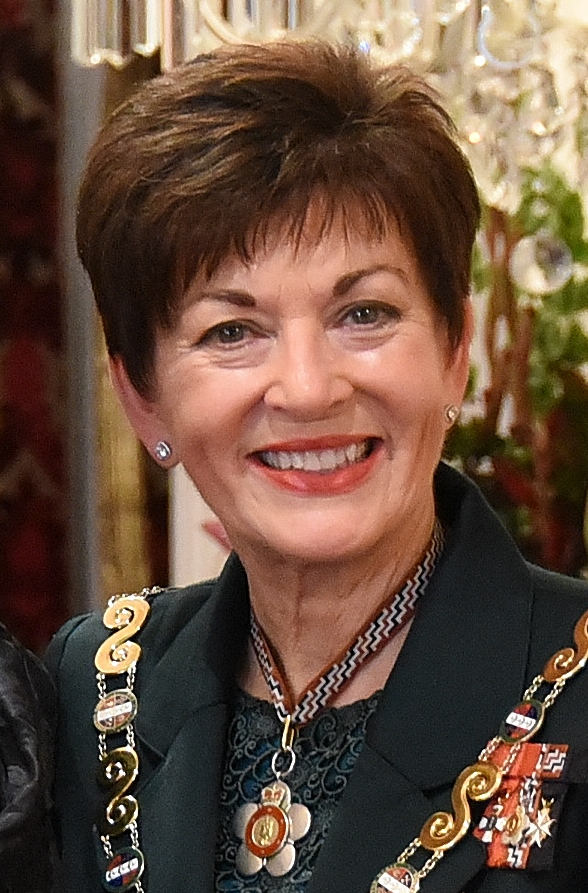
Patsy Reddy

=== Government ===
2016 is the second full year of the 51st Parliament, which first sat on 21 October 2014.

The Fifth National Government, first elected in 2008, continues.

- Speaker of the House – David Carter
- Prime Minister – John Key (until 12 December), then Bill English
- Deputy Prime Minister – Bill English (until 12 December), then Paula Bennett
- Leader of the House – Gerry Brownlee
- Minister of Finance – Bill English, then (from 20 December) Steven Joyce
- Minister of Foreign Affairs – Murray McCully
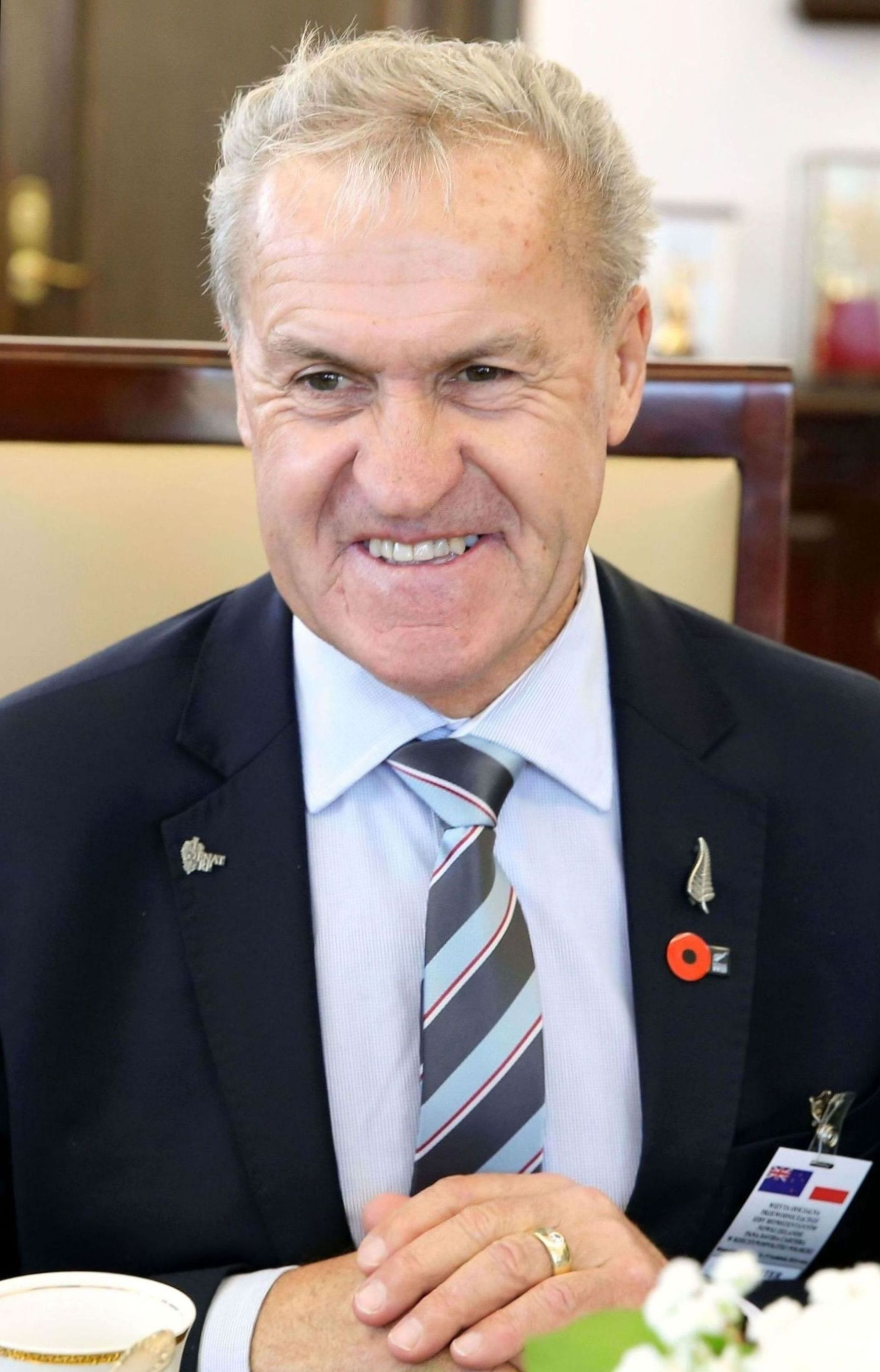
David Carter

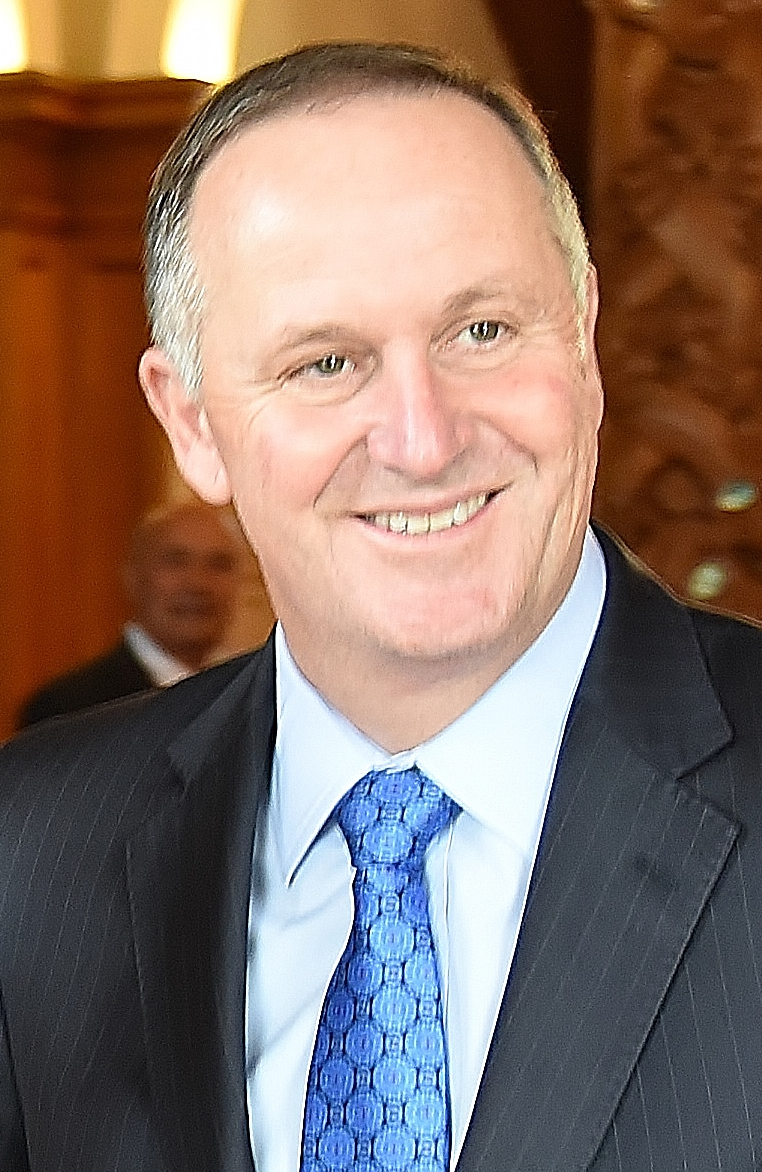
John Key

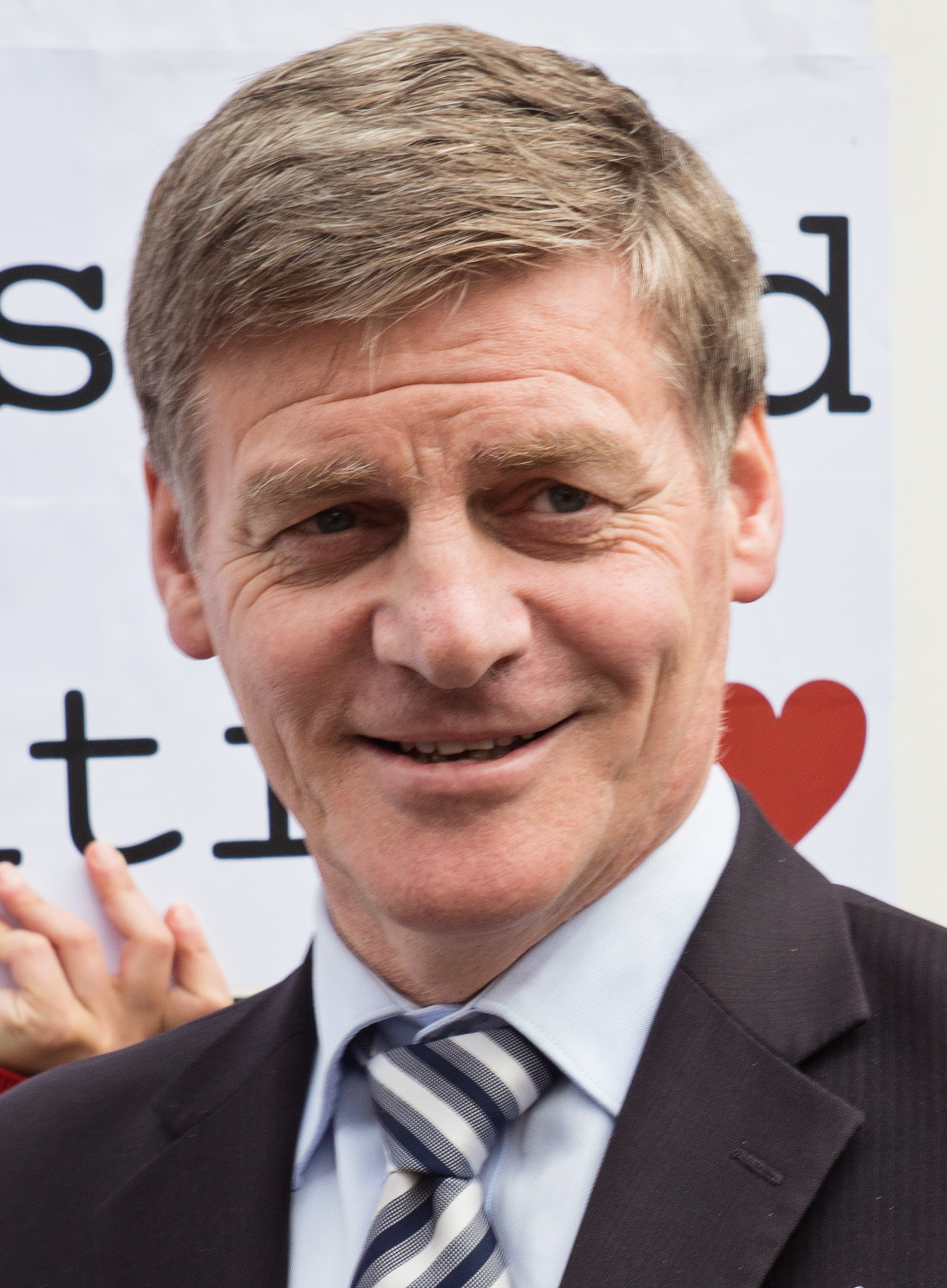
Bill English

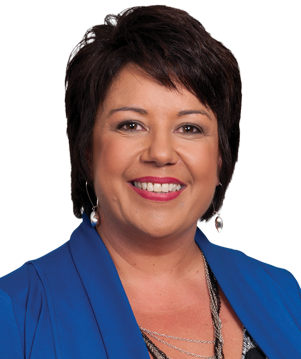
Paula Bennett

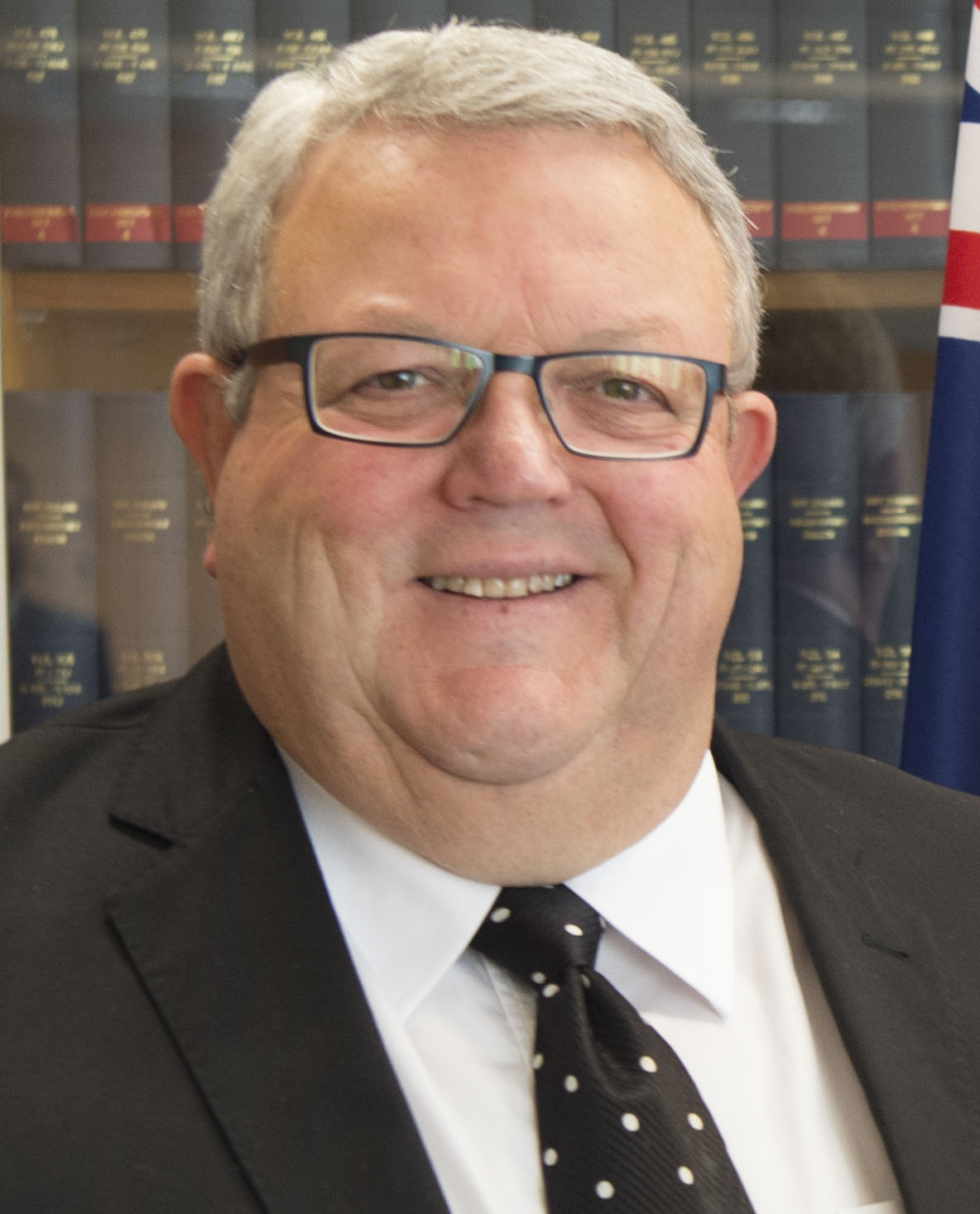
Gerry Brownlee

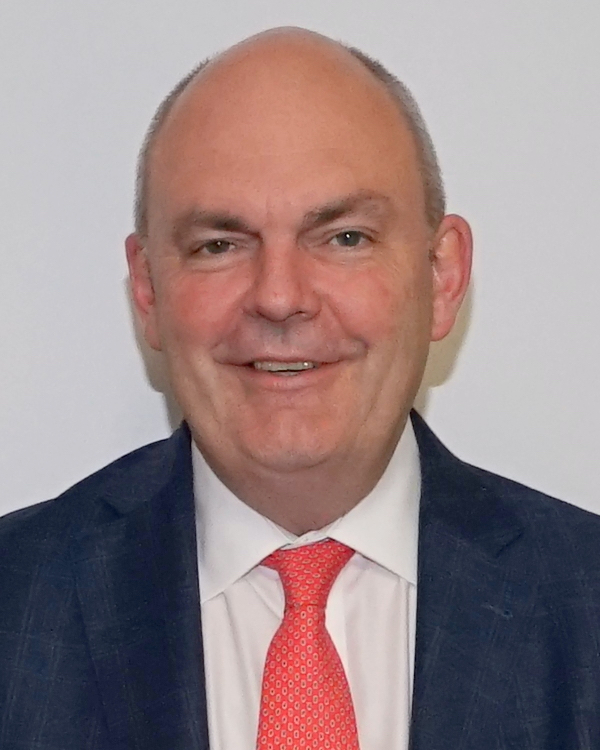
Steven Joyce

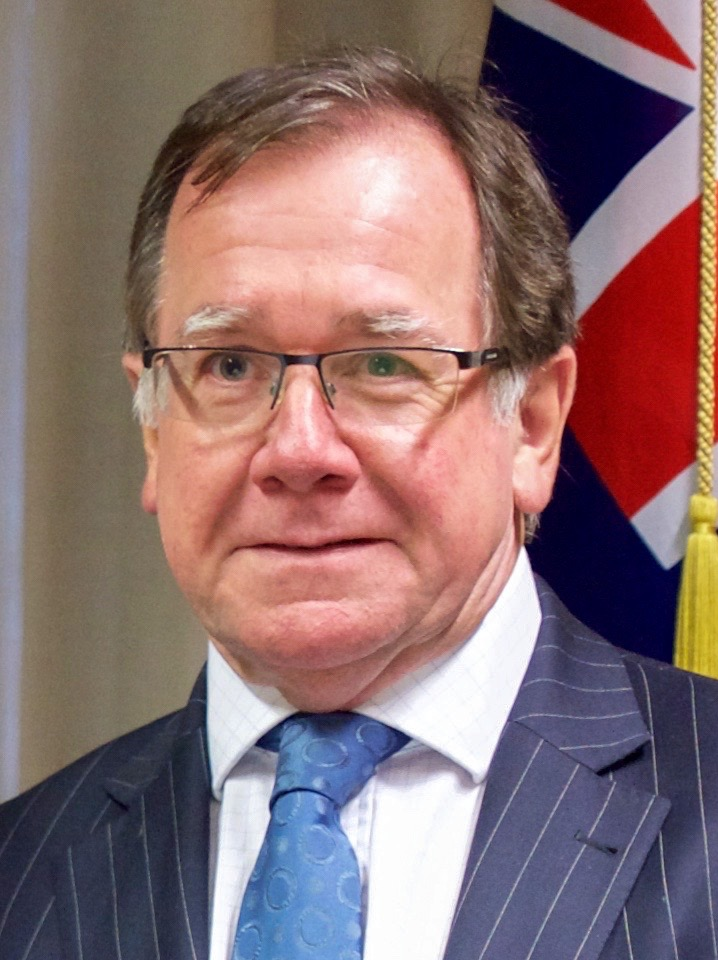
Murray McCully

=== Other party leaders in parliament ===
- Labour – Andrew Little
- Green – James Shaw and Metiria Turei
- New Zealand First – Winston Peters
- Māori Party – Te Ururoa Flavell and Marama Fox
- ACT New Zealand – David Seymour
- United Future – Peter Dunne
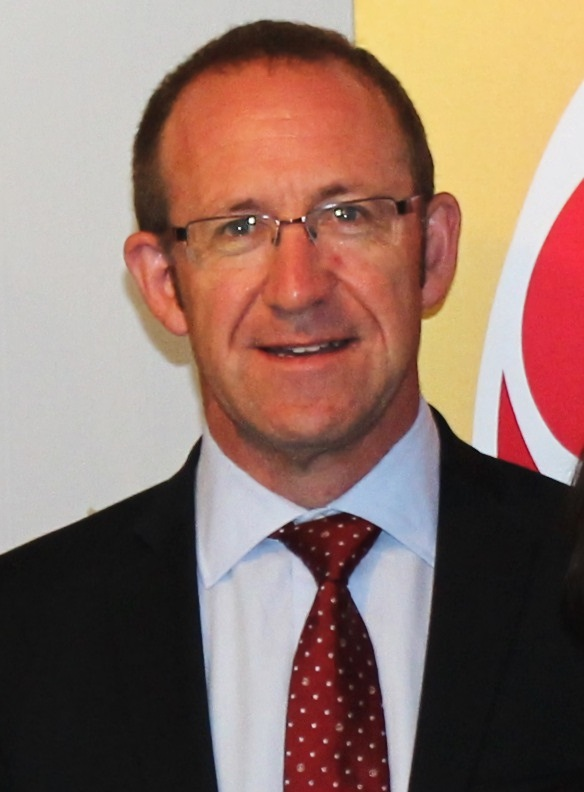
Andrew Little

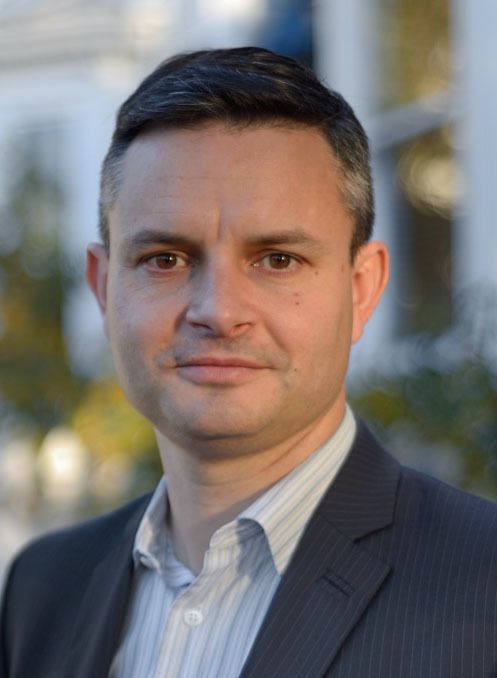
James Shaw

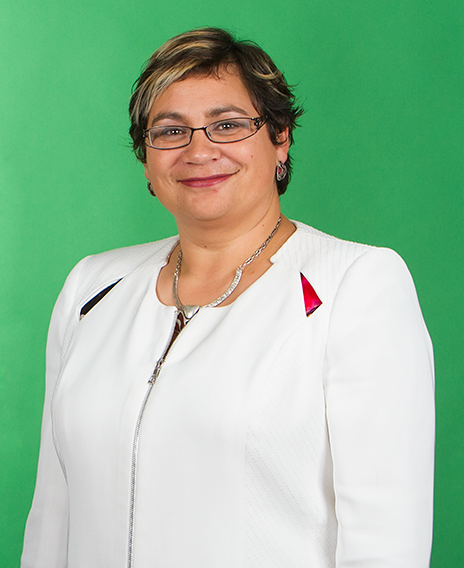
Metiria Turei

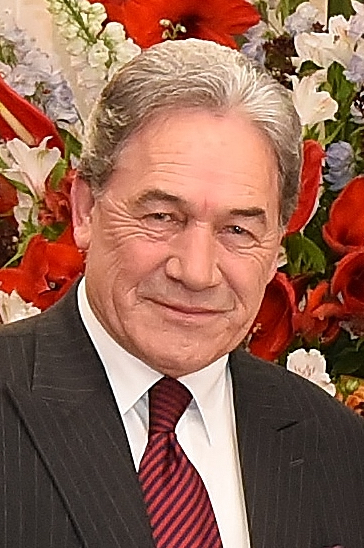
Winston Peters

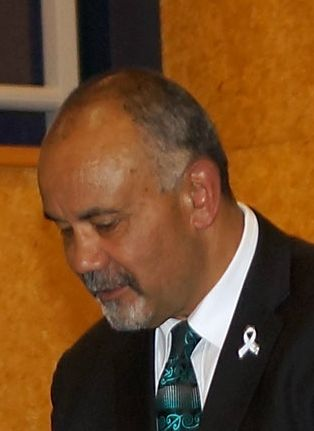
Te Ururoa Flavell

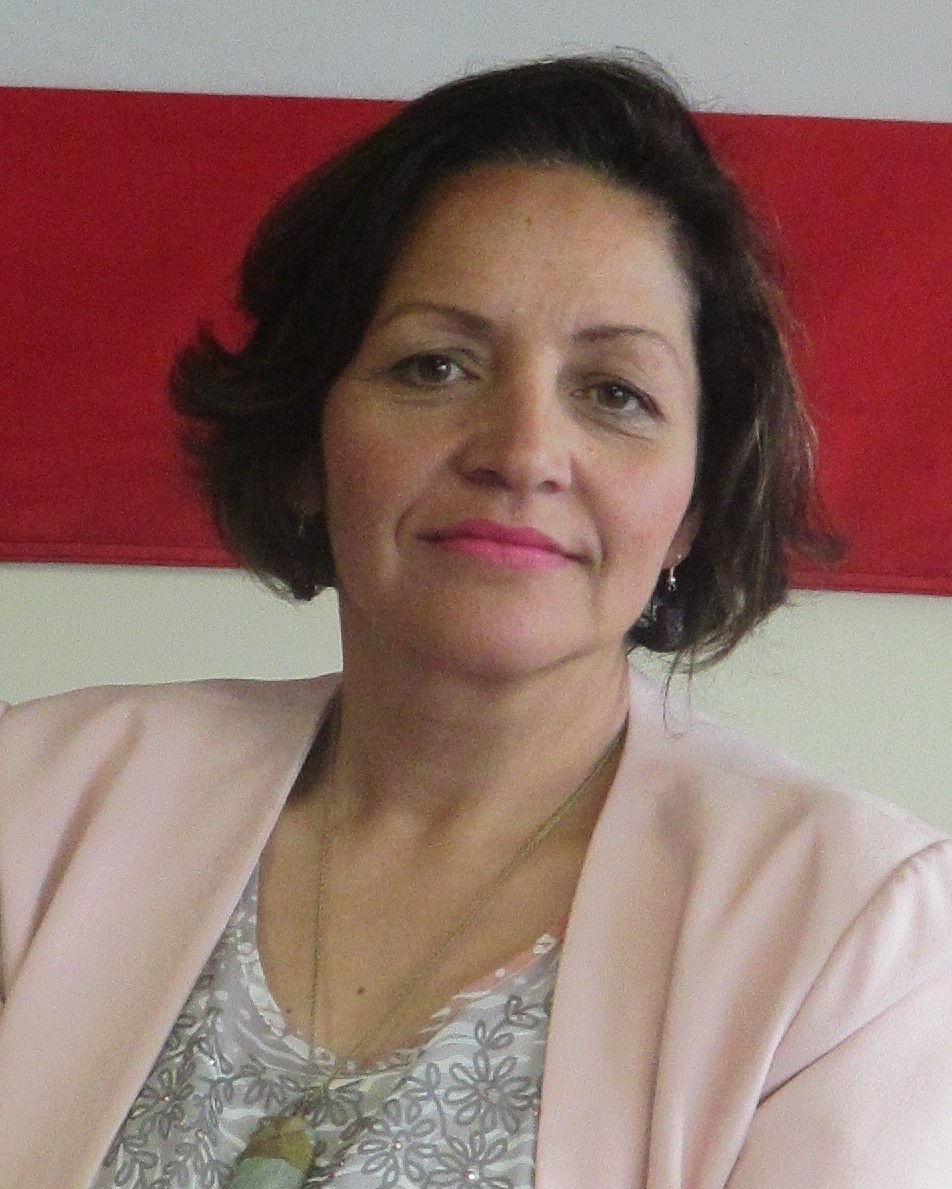
Marama Fox

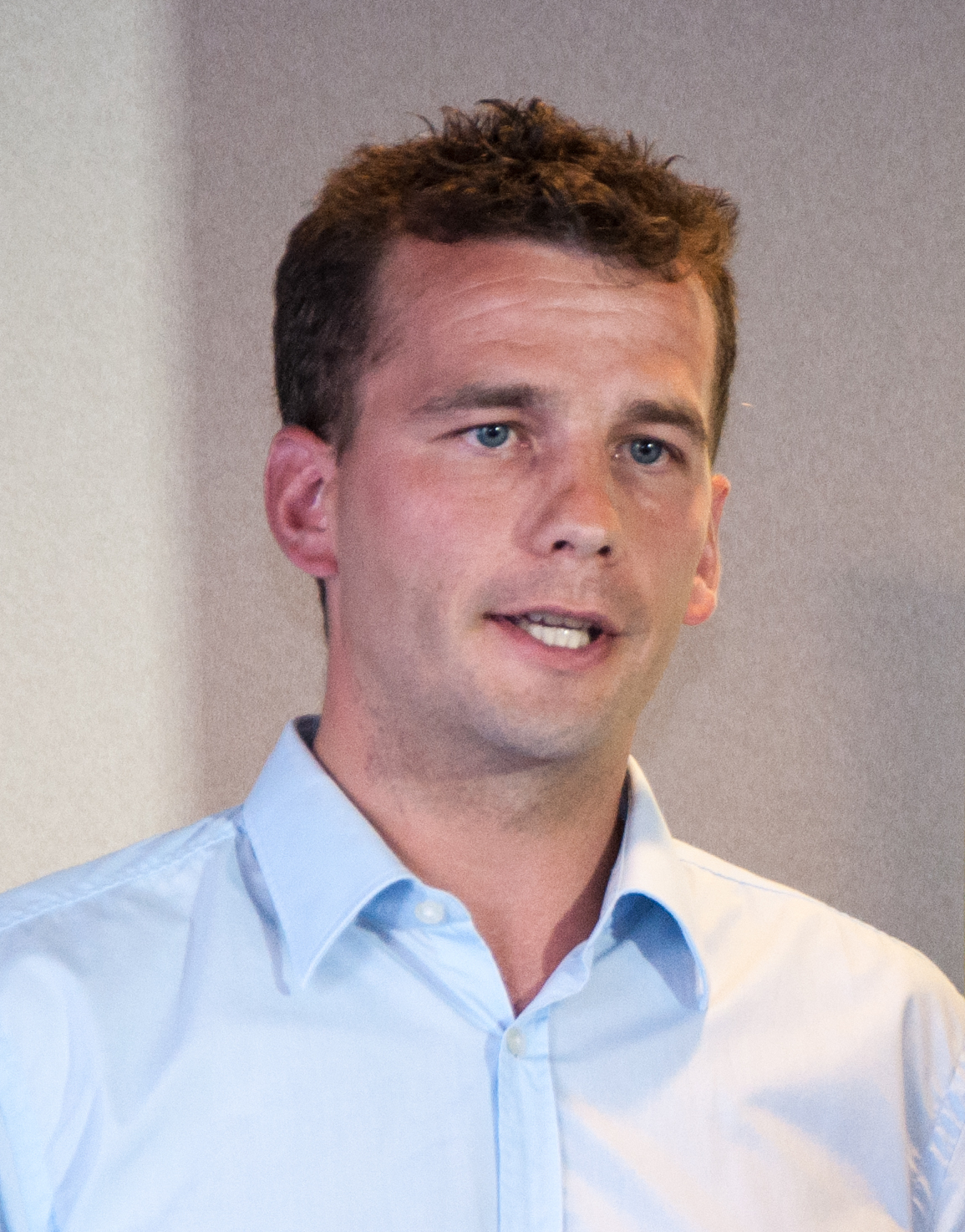
David Seymour

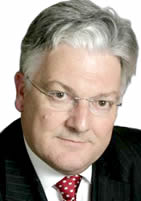
Peter Dunne

=== Judiciary ===
- Chief Justice – Sian Elias
- President of the Court of Appeal – Ellen France, and then Stephen Kós from 22 July
- Chief High Court judge – Geoffrey Venning
- Chief District Court judge – Jan-Marie Doogue
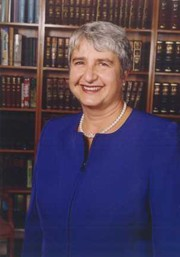
Sian Elias

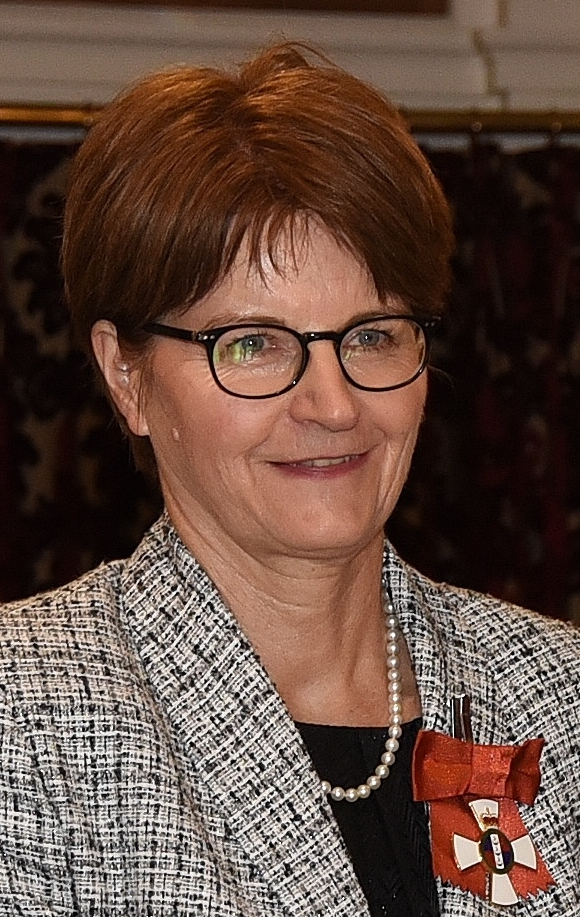
Ellen France

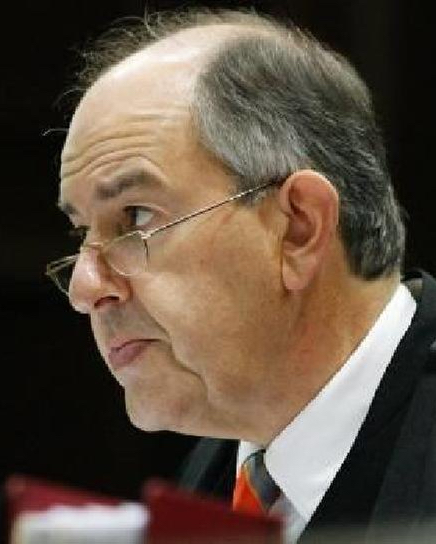
Stephen Kós

=== Main centre leaders ===
- Mayor of Auckland – Len Brown, then from 1 November Phil Goff
- Mayor of Tauranga – Stuart Crosby, then from 31 October Greg Brownless
- Mayor of Hamilton – Julie Hardaker, then from 9 November Andrew King
- Mayor of Wellington – Celia Wade-Brown, then from 26 October Justin Lester
- Mayor of Christchurch – Lianne Dalziel
- Mayor of Dunedin – Dave Cull
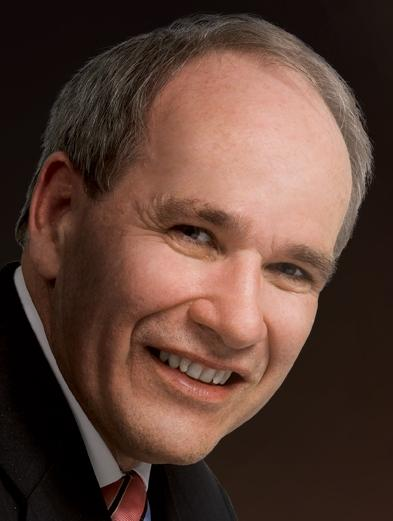
Len Brown

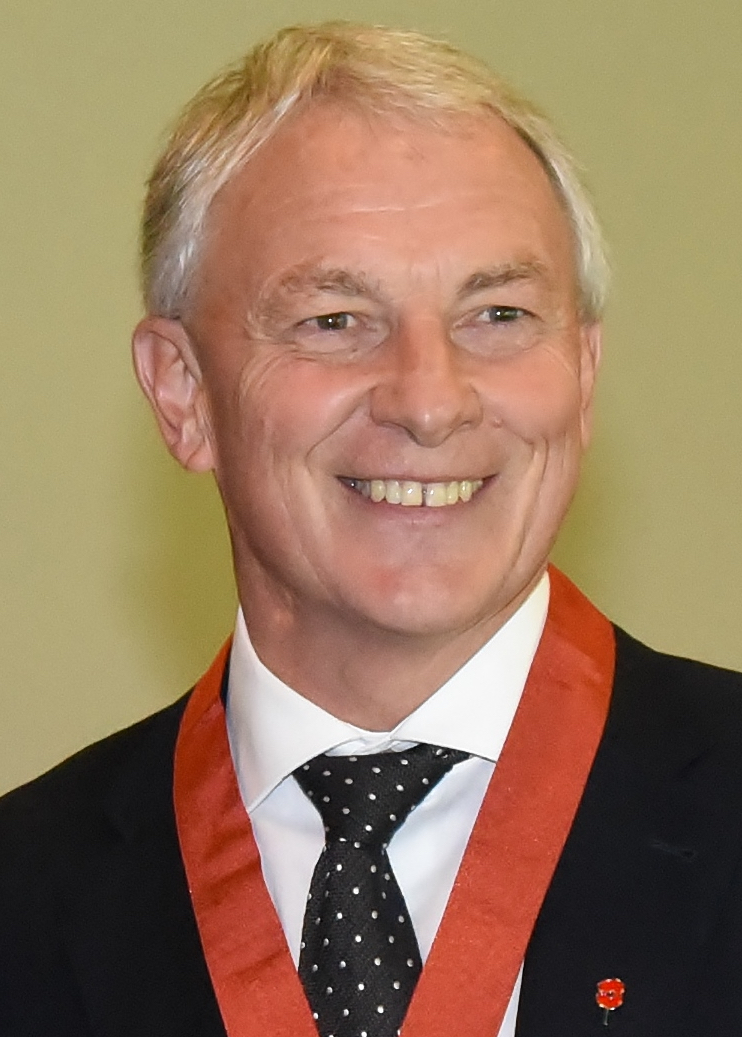
Phil Goff

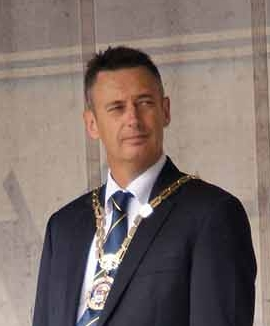
Stuart Crosby

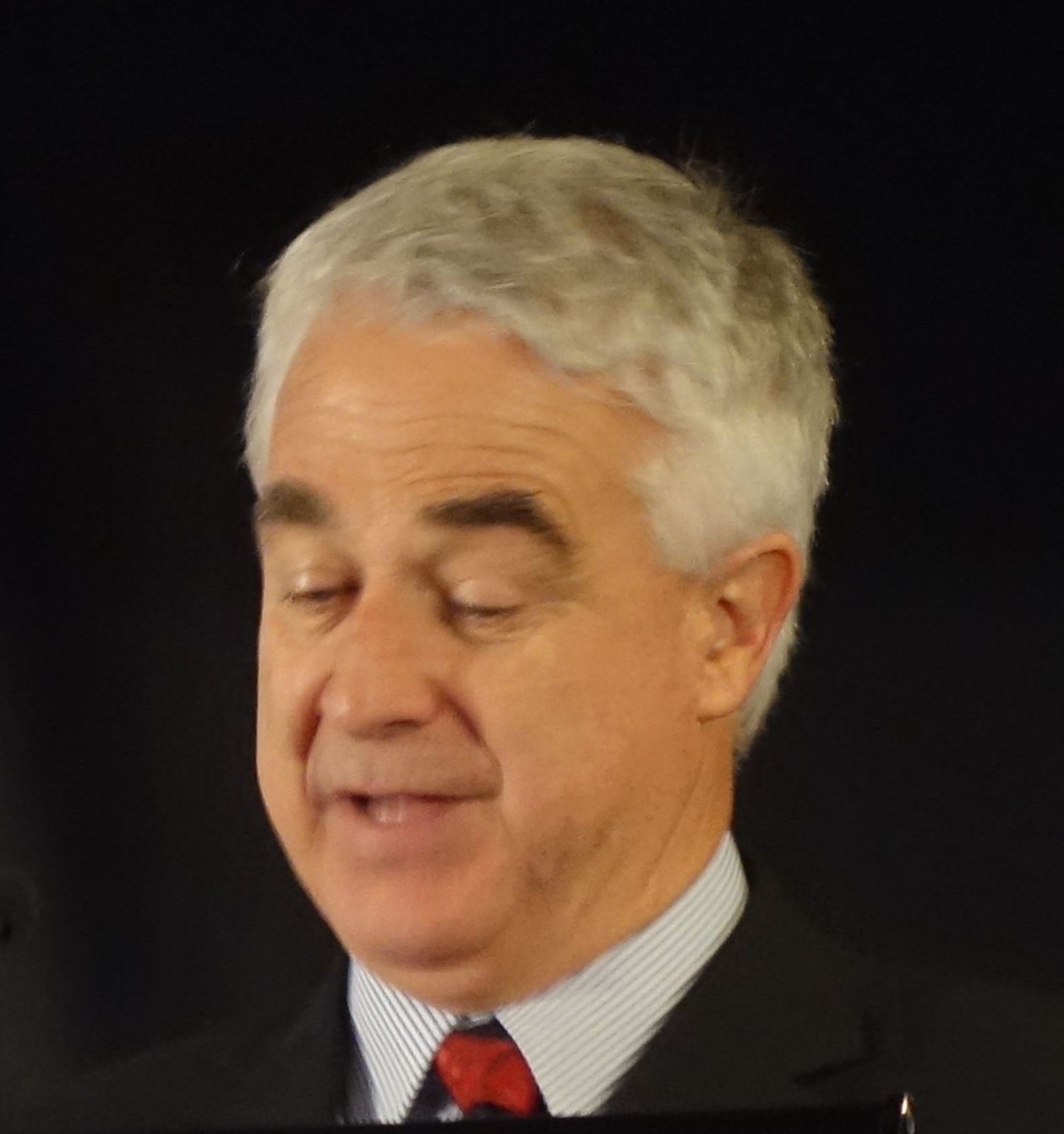
Greg Brownless

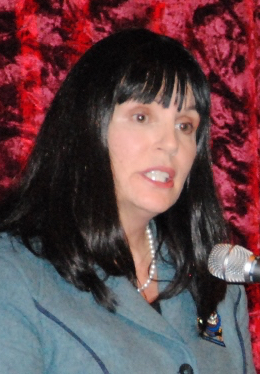
Julie Hardaker

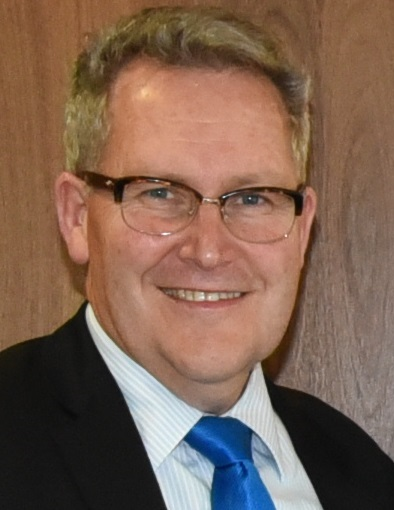
Andrew King

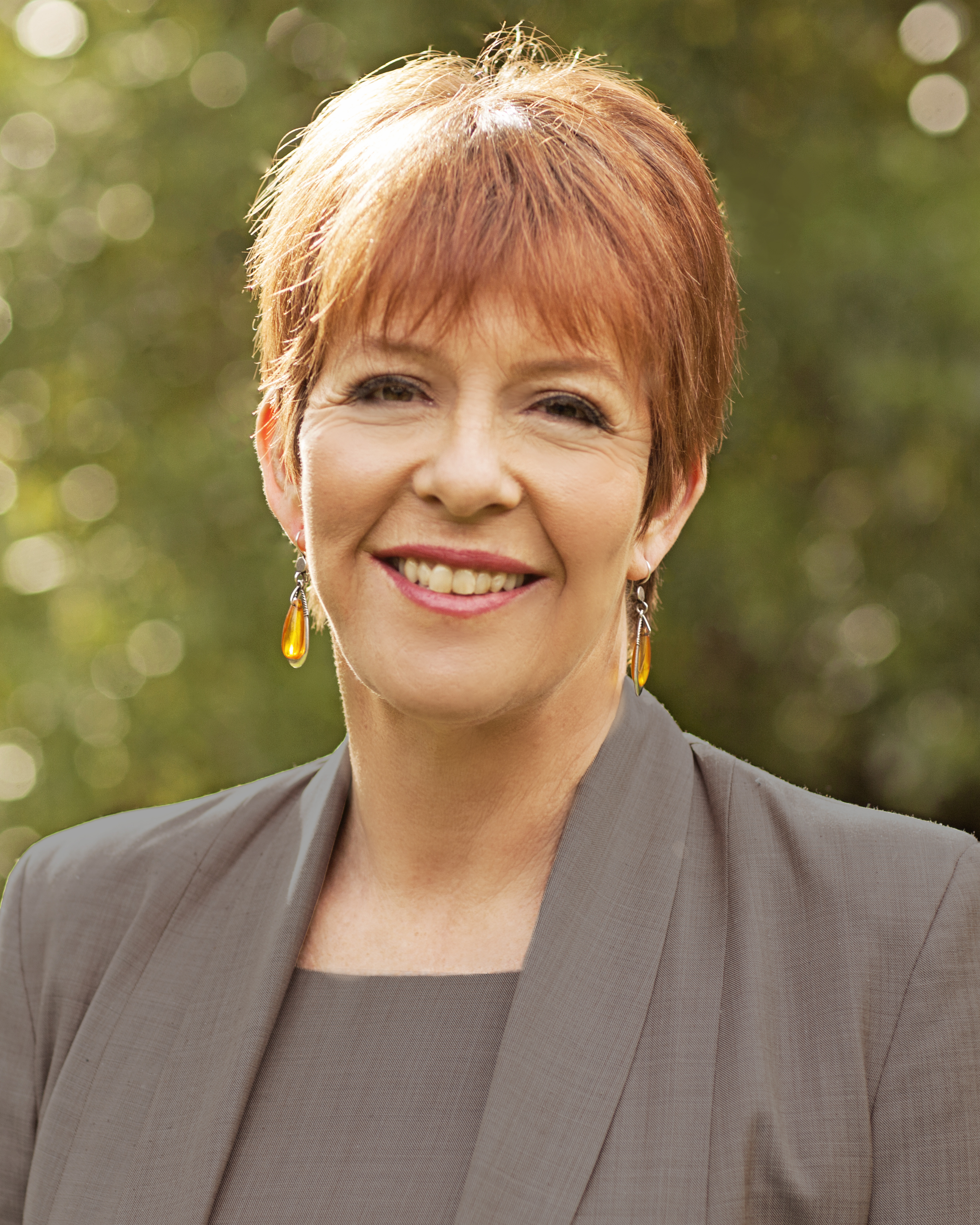
Celia Wade-Brown

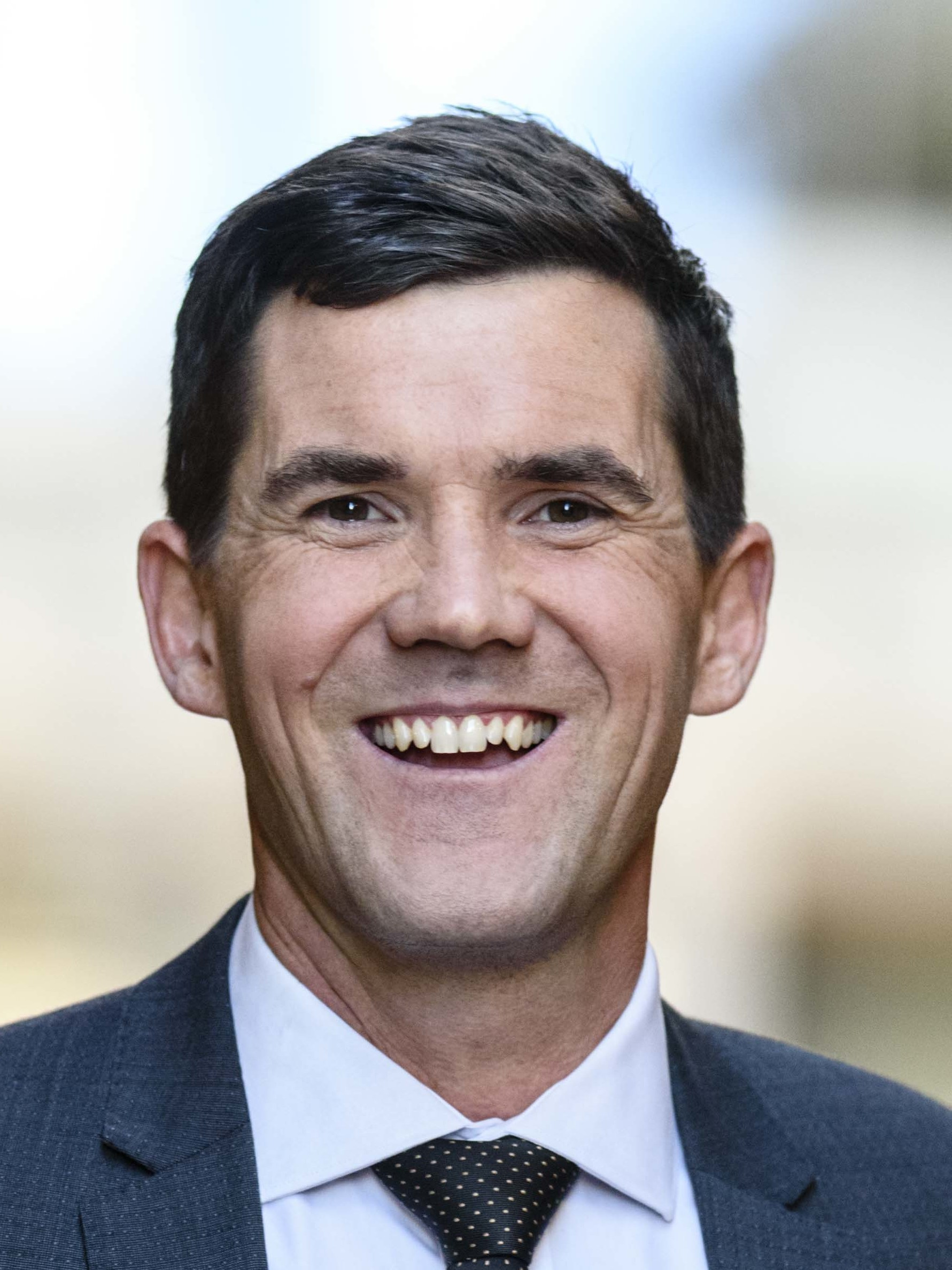
Justin Lester

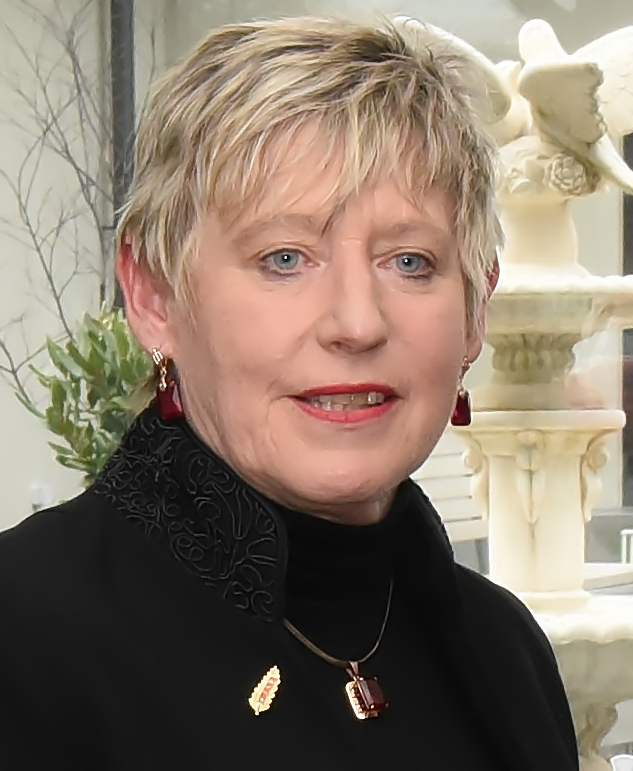
Lianne Dalziell

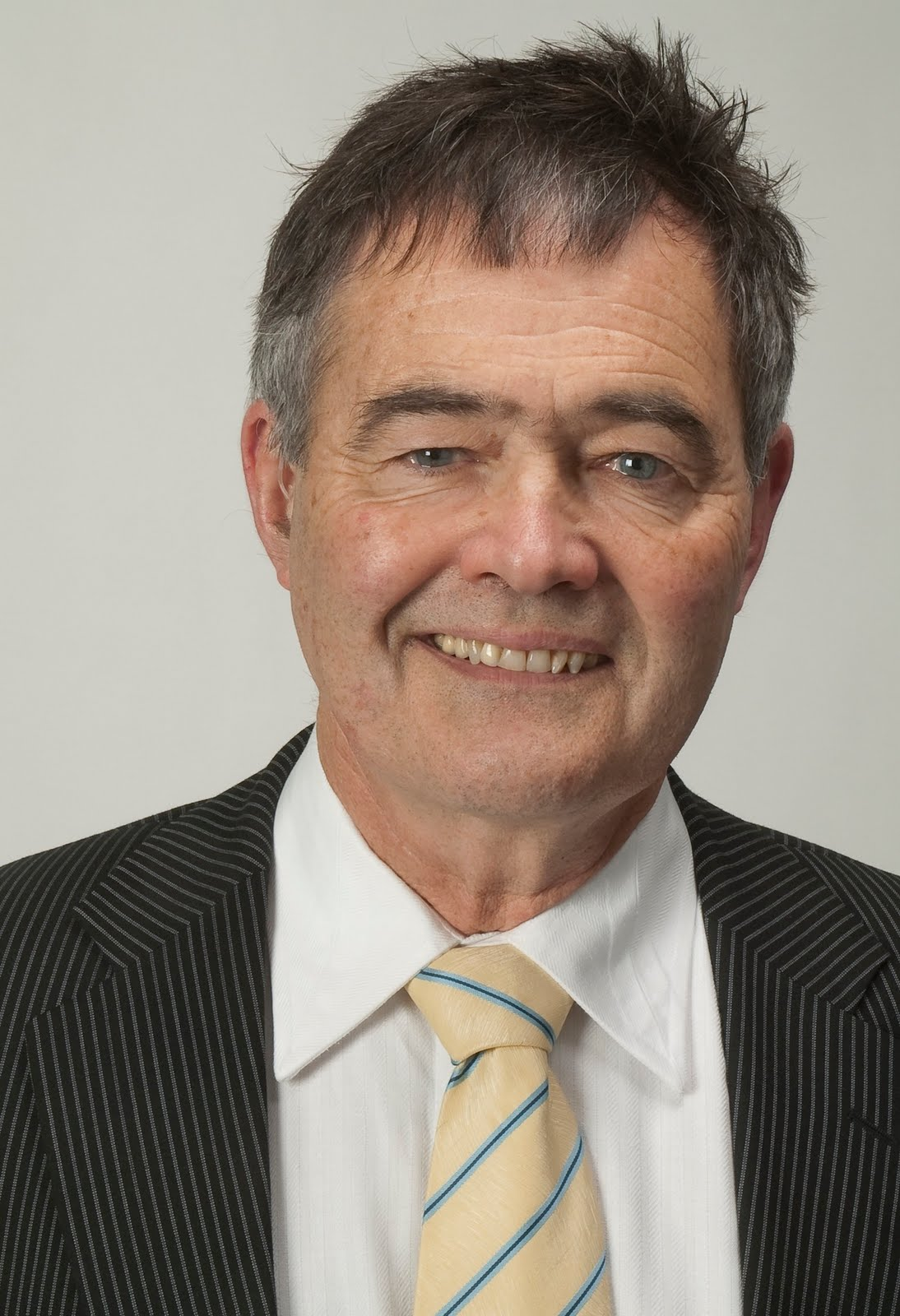
Dave Cull

== Events ==
=== February ===
- 8 February – Operation Neptune begins.
- 14 February – A significant aftershock in Christchurch causes some cliffs to collapse.

=== March ===
- 3–24 March – Second referendum on changing the country's flag – existing flag retained.
- 11 March – Parliament passes legislation to outlaw zero-hour contracts.

=== April ===
- 18 April – The Canterbury Earthquake Recovery Authority is disestablished.

=== June ===
- 6 June – The 2016 Queen's Birthday Honours are announced.

=== August ===
- 5–21 August – 132 athletes from New Zealand compete at the 2016 Summer Olympics in Rio de Janeiro, Brazil.

=== September ===
- 2 September – A 7.1 magnitude earthquake strikes north-east of Te Araroa.

=== October ===
- 8 October – The 2016 local elections are held.

=== November ===
- 14 November – A M_{W} 7.8 earthquake strikes Kaikōura at midnight, killing two people.
- 22 November – Operation Neptune ends.

=== December ===
- 5 December – John Key announces that he will step down as prime minister and leader of the National Party on 12 December.
- 12 December – Bill English is sworn in as New Zealand's 39th prime minister, following the resignation of John Key.
- 15 December – Amazon Prime Video launches in New Zealand.
- 31 December – The 2017 New Year Honours are announced.

== Arts and literature ==
=== Performing arts ===
- Benny Award presented by the Variety Artists Club of New Zealand to Suzanne Prentice.

== Sport ==
=== Halberg Awards ===
- 54th Halberg Awards (awarded 9 February 2017 for the 2016 calendar year)
  - Supreme Award – Lisa Carrington (canoeing)
  - Sportsman of the Year – Mahé Drysdale (rowing)
  - Sportswoman of the Year – Lisa Carrington (canoeing)
  - Team of the Year – Men's 49er class: Peter Burling & Blair Tuke (sailing)
  - Disabled Sportsperson of the Year – Liam Malone (athletics)
  - Coach of the Year – Gordon Walker (canoeing)
  - Emerging Talent – Campbell Stewart (cycling)

=== Olympics ===
- New Zealand sends a team of 199 competitors across 20 sports.
- Sprint canoeist Lisa Carrington becomes the first New Zealand women to win two medals in the same Olympic Games.

Gold	Silver	Bronze	Total
4	9	5	18

=== Paralympics ===
- Swimmer Sophie Pascoe overtakes Eve Rimmer to become New Zealand's most successful Paralympian in terms of medals won.

Gold	Silver	Bronze	Total
9	5	7	21

=== Rowing ===
- New Zealand Secondary School Championships (Maadi Cup)
  - Maadi Cup (boys U18 eight) – Christ's College
  - Levin 75th Jubilee Cup (girls U18 eight) – Diocesan School for Girls
  - Star Trophy (overall points) – St Peter's School (Cambridge)

=== Shooting ===
- Ballinger Belt – Malcolm Dodson (Kaituna/Blenheim)

=== Winter Youth Olympics ===
- New Zealand sends a team of 11 competitors in five sports.

Gold	Silver	Bronze	Total
0	1	1	2

== Births ==
- 6 November – Probabeel, Thoroughbred racehorse
- 15 November – Copy That, Standardbred racehorse

== Deaths ==
=== January ===
- 2 January – Tim Francis, diplomat (born 1928)
- 5 January – Keith Thiele, World War II pilot (born 1921)
- 7 January – David Shale, mathematician (born 1932)
- 8 January – Ida Gaskin, schoolteacher, quiz show contestant, politician (born 1919)
- 17 January
  - Melvin Day, artist (born 1923)
  - Jules Le Lievre, rugby union player (born 1933)
- 22 January – Alec Wishart, musician (born 1939)
- 23 January – Barry Brickell, potter (born 1935)
- 24 January – Neville Black, rugby union and rugby league player (born 1925)
- 26 January – Bob Thomas, long jumper (born 1939)
- 27 January – Shirley Tonkin, sudden infant death syndrome researcher (born 1921)
- 28 January
  - Rob Courtney, Paralympic athlete (born 1959)
  - Peter Robinson, musician (born 1958)
  - Bob Tizard, politician, deputy prime minister (1974–75) (born 1924)
- 31 January
  - Mere Broughton, Māori language activist, unionist (born 1938)
  - Rona McCarthy, athlete (born 1916)

=== February ===
- 1 February – Kelly McGarry, mountain biker (born 1982)
- 2 February
  - Chris Kenny, boxing trainer (born 1937)
  - Marcus Turner, singer-songwriter, folk musician, television presenter (born 1956)
- 4 February – Jim Higgins, politician, Mayor of Tokoroa (1966–1979) (born 1931)
- 7 February – Andrew Hintz, cricketer (born 1963)
- 10 February – John Spencer, businessman (born c.1934)
- 13 February – Barry Jones, Catholic Bishop of Christchurch (born 1941)
- 17 February – Sophia Hawthorne, actress (born 1976)
- 23 February – George Newton, weightlifter (born 1936)
- 24 February – Ken English, rugby league player (born 1927)
- 26 February – Jack Forrest, rugby league player (born 1924)
- 28 February – Bob Morrison, association footballer (born 1926)
- 29 February – Ranginui Walker, Māori academic (born 1932)

=== March ===
- 3 March – Martin Crowe, cricketer (born 1962)
- 4 March – Harry Turbott, architect, landscape architect, environmentalist (born 1930)
- 5 March – David Abbott, cricket umpire (born 1934)
- 10 March – Judy Pickard, abstract painter, librarian and advocate for women's rights (born 1921)
- 11 March – Sel Belsham, rugby league player, cricketer (born 1930)
- 16 March – George Menzies, rugby league player and coach (born 1930)
- 18 March – Paul Swadel, film director and producer (born 1969)
- 19 March – Graham Fortune, diplomat and public servant (born 1941)
- 25 March – Ross Jennings, television producer and director (born 1944)
- 27 March – Frank Torley, television reporter, director and producer (born 1941)
- 31 March – Mark Vryenhoek, alpine skier (born 1960)

=== April ===
- 3 April
  - Rowley Habib, poet, playwright, short-story writer (born 1933)
  - Whai Ngata, broadcaster, journalist, lexicographer (born c.1942)
- 4 April – Maida Bryant, politician, community leader (born 1926)
- 7 April – Matiu Dickson, politician, kapa haka exponent (born 1952)
- 11 April – Ruth Gilbert, poet (born 1917)
- 12 April – Alan Loveday, violinist (born 1928)
- 13 April – Kurtis Haiu, rugby union player (born 1984)
- 14 April – Colin Knight, educationalist (born 1934)
- 22 April
  - Rex Fell, Thoroughbred racehorse breeder (born c.1945)
  - Peter Sellers, sports broadcaster (born 1921)
- 23 April – Bill Sevesi, musician (born 1923)
- 24 April – Paul Annear, jeweller (born 1947)
- 27 April – Chris Parkinson, broadcaster (born 1941)

=== May ===
- 3 May – Ian Quigley, politician (born 1931)
- 13 May – David Garner, physical oceanographer (born 1928)
- 18 May – Ian Watkin, actor (born 1940)
- 21 May – Tony Kriletich, rugby league player (born 1944)
- 25 May – Bob Sorenson, rugby union player and coach, cricketer (born 1923)

=== June ===
- 1 June – Leonard Boyle, bishop (born 1930)
- 2 June
  - Keith Lawrence, World War II fighter pilot (born 1919)
  - Brian Reidy, rugby league player (born 1939)
- 4 June – Bill Snowden, rugby league player (born 1935)
- 6 June – Keith Smith, cricketer (born 1929)
- 7 June – Sir Graham Latimer, Māori leader (born 1926)
- 9 June – Joyce Carpenter, diver (born 1923)
- 10 June – Derek Wilson, architect and environmentalist (born 1922)
- 15 June – David Hall, chemistry academic (born 1928)
- 16 June – Pat Suggate, geologist (born 1922)
- 21 June – Susanna Ounei, Kanak independence activist, feminist (born 1945)
- 23 June – Roy Crawford, mechanical engineering academic, university administrator (born c.1949)
- 25 June – Jack Cropp, yachtsman (born 1927)
- 27 June – Dame Grace Hollander, community leader (born 1922)
- 29 June – Maurie Gordon, sport shooter (born 1926)

=== July ===
- 5 July
  - Johnny Borland, high jumper, athletics administrator (born 1925)
  - Max Carr, field athlete and coach, athletics official, air force officer (born 1922)
  - Rex Pickering, rugby union player (born 1936)
- 14 July
  - Ivan Bootham, writer, composer (born 1939)
  - Hallard "Snow" White, rugby union player, coach and administrator (born 1929)
- 19 July – Ray Bell, rugby union player (born 1925)
- 20 July
  - Dick Corballis, English literature academic (born 1946)
  - Ray Moreton, rugby union player (born 1942)
- 21 July – Sid Hurst, farmer (born 1918)
- 22 July – Lee Grant, actor, singer, choreographer (born 1931)
- 26 July – Henry Connor, botanist (born 1922)
- 30 July – Peter Gossage, author and illustrator (born 1946)

=== August ===
- 2 August – Terence Bayler, actor (born 1930)
- 3 August – Chris Amon, motor racing driver (born 1943)
- 5 August – Don Donnithorne, architect (born 1926)
- 7 August – Sir Ron Scott, sports administrator (born 1928)
- 11 August – Sir Ian Turbott, diplomat, university administrator (born 1922)
- 19 August – Bob Skelton, jockey (born 1934)
- 22 August – Don McIver, military leader, public servant (born 1936)
- 24 August – Glen Evans, politician, mayor of Lower Hutt (1986–95) (born 1936)
- 29 August – Edward Latter, military officer, politician, diplomat (born 1928)
- 30 August – Brian Robinson, inorganic chemist (born 1940)

=== September ===
- 1 September – Sir Graeme Douglas, businessman, pharmacist, philanthropist (born 1929)
- 4 September – Ross McPherson, field hockey player, cricketer (born 1938)
- 7 September – Don "D. J." Cameron, sports journalist (born 1933)
- 11 September – Let's Elope, Thoroughbred racehorse (foaled 1987)
- 16 September – Reese Griffiths, rugby league player (born 1937)
- 19 September – Margaret Baird, immunologist (born 1945)
- 23 September

- Arnold Green, rugby league player (born c.1933)
- Bill Johnson, actor (born 1924)

=== October ===
- 1 October
  - Brian Bell, ornithologist (born 1930)
  - Toni Williams, singer (born 1939)
- 3 October – David Donald, cricketer (born 1933)
- 4 October – Peggy Hay, designer (born 1924)
- 14 October
  - Avis Higgs, textile designer, painter (born 1918)
  - Helen Kelly, trade unionist (born 1964)
- 15 October
  - Doug Anderson, rugby league player (born 1926)
  - Octagonal, Thoroughbred racehorse (foaled 1992)
- 21 October – Wally Argus, rugby union player (born 1921)
- 24 October – Roger Slack, plant biologist and biochemist (born 1937)
- 29 October – Tom Weal, politician (born 1929)
- 30 October – Reg Boorman, politician (born 1935)

=== November ===
- 11 November – Sir James McNeish, writer (born 1931)
- 13 November – Leslie Kenton, journalist, entrepreneur (born 1941)
- 14 November – Marti Friedlander, photographer (born 1928)
- 15 November – Rod Bieleski, plant physiologist (born 1931)
- 16 November – Jean Wishart, magazine editor (born 1920)
- 20 November
  - Mita Mohi, rugby league player, mau rākau and kapa haka exponent, youth worker (born 1939)
  - Tim Raphael, Anglican priest (born 1929)
- 21 November – Helen Ryburn, school principal, local-body politician (born 1925)
- 22 November
  - Mike Burgoyne, rugby union player (born 1951)
  - Bev Malcolm, netball player (born 1920)
- 25 November – Bill Skelton, jockey (born 1931)
- 28 November – Ray Columbus, entertainer (born 1942)
- 29 November – Margaret Belcher, literary scholar (born 1936)

=== December ===
- 3 December – Sir David Hay, cardiologist, anti-smoking campaigner (born 1927)
- 6 December – Elva Bett, artist, art historian, art gallery director (born 1918)
- 12 December – Lord Gyllene, Thoroughbred racehorse (foaled 1988)
- 13 December – Christopher Vance, Standardbred racehorse (foaled 1986)
- 14 December – Bunny Walters, singer (born 1953)
- 15 December – Richard Dowden, astrophysicist (born 1932)
- 18 December – Frank Crotty, rower, industrial chemist (born 1938)
- 19 December – Arthur Berry, cricketer (born 1928)
- 23 December – Doug Coombs, cricketer, geologist (born 1924)
- 24 December – Ron Broom, cricketer (born 1925)
- 25 December – John Gregson, George Cross recipient (born 1924)
- 30 December – Con Linton, sailor (born 1938)
