= Robert Morrison =

Robert, Bob, Bobby, or Rob Morrison may refer to:

== Academics ==
- Robert Hall Morrison (1798–1889), president of Davidson College
- Robert J. H. Morrison (born 1961), Canadian academic
- Rob Morrison (scientist) (born 1942), Australian zoological researcher and science communicator
- Robert G. Morrison (born 1969), professor of religion

== Politics ==
- Robert F. Morrison (1826–1887), 13th Chief Justice of the Supreme Court of California
- Robert Morrison, 1st Baron Morrison (1881–1953), British Labour Party politician
- Robert Morrison (politician) (1909–1999), Arizona Attorney General 1955–1960
- Rob Morrison (politician) (born 1956), Canadian politician

== Sports ==
=== Association football (soccer) ===
- Bob Morrison (footballer) (1869–1891), Irish footballer with Linfield
- Bobby Morrison (footballer, born 1896) (1896–1974), English footballer
- Bobby Morrison (footballer, born 1933) (1933–1999), Scottish footballer with Falkirk, Rangers, Workington
- Robert Morrison (soccer) (1883–1952), Scottish-American soccer player
- Robert Morrison (footballer) (1926–2016), New Zealand footballer

=== Other sports ===
- Bobby Morrison (American football) (1945–2024), American college football player and coach
- Robert Morrison (rower) (1902–1980), British rower

== Others ==
- Robert Morrison (missionary) (1782–1834), Protestant missionary
- Robert Morrison (Phi Delta Theta) (1822–1902), one of the founders of Phi Delta Theta
- Bob Morrison (songwriter) (born 1942), American country songwriter
- Rob Morrison (journalist), American television journalist and news anchor
- Robert Morrison (artist) (1941–2018), American artist and teacher

== See also ==
- Robbie Morrison, 21st-century British comics writer
- Robert Morison (1620–1683), Scottish botanist
- Robert Morrison MacIver (1882–1970), Scottish-born American sociologist
