= Hung Liu =

Chinese-American painter (1948–2021)

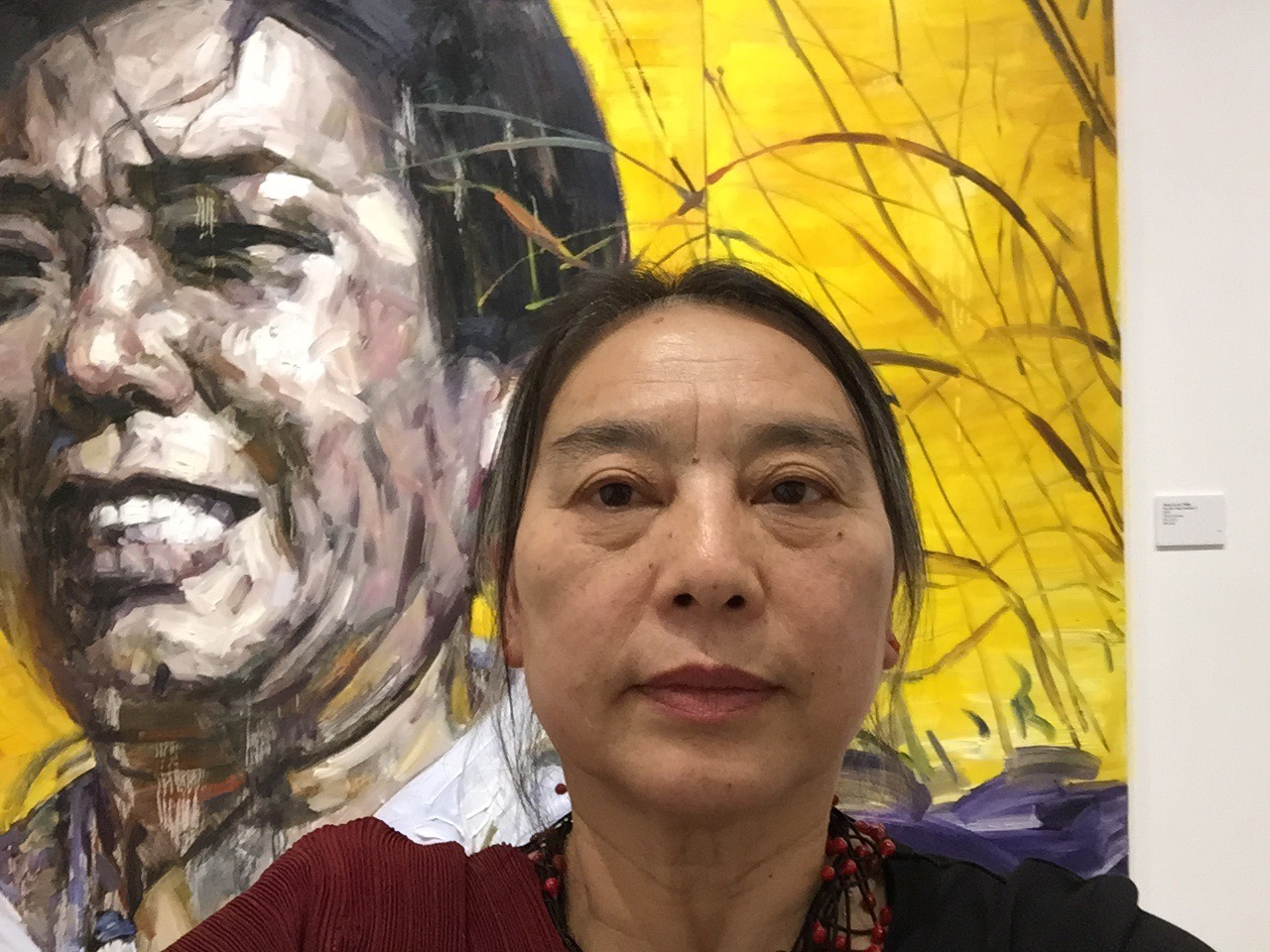
- In front of her painting from her "Daughters of China" series
- Born: 17 February 1948; Changchun, China
- Died: 7 August 2021 (aged 73); Oakland, California, U.S.
- Education: Beijing Teachers College, Central Academy of Fine Arts, University of California, San Diego
- Known for: Painting, mural painting
- Awards: Joan Mitchell Fellowship (1998), SECA award (1992), Eureka Fellowship (1993), SGC International Award for Lifetime Achievement (2011)

Chinese name
- Traditional Chinese: 劉虹
- Simplified Chinese: 刘虹
Transcriptions
Standard Mandarin
- Hanyu Pinyin: Liú Hóng
- Website: www.hungliu.com

Hung Liu (劉虹) (17 February 1948 – 7 August 2021) was a Chinese-born American contemporary artist. She was predominantly a painter, but also worked with mixed-media and site-specific installation and was also one of the first artists from China to establish a career in the United States.

A ten-year retrospective of Liu's work traveled nationally in the U.S. in 1998 and 1999. Summoning Ghosts: The Art of Hung Liu was a retrospective collection of Liu's work with paintings from more than 40 collections displayed.

== Early life and work in China ==
Hung Liu was born in Changchun, China in 1948. Shortly after her birth, her father was imprisoned for being a member of the Kuomintang of China. In 1958, Hung Liu followed her aunt to Beijing at the age of 10 and entered the famous 北师大 女附中 (now The Experimental High School Attached to Beijing Normal University). In 1968, two years after the beginning of China's Cultural Revolution, Liu was sent to Huairou, a small village in the Beijing countryside, where she lived and worked among the local villagers from 1968 to 1972. She attended Beijing Teachers College in 1975 and studied mural painting as a graduate student at the Central Academy of Fine Arts in Beijing. As a student Liu's art education had strict limits; the constrained and academic style which students were forced to emulate has been likened by Liu to paint-by-numbers. Although the use of cameras to aid painting was prohibited, Liu rebelled by secretly taking photographs of local farmers in Huairou with their families and making drawings of them.

1972 oil painting by Hung Liu from the "My Secret Freedom" series.

== Work ==
Her paintings and prints typically featured layered brushstrokes combined with washes of linseed oil which gave images a drippy appearance. They were often inspired by anonymous Chinese historical and contemporary photographs, particularly those of women, children, refugees, and soldiers. Some have suggested that this visual strategy's surrealism and its absence of Socialist political drive can be seen as the opposite of (or a rejoinder to) the rigid academicism of the Chinese Socialist Realist style in which Liu was trained. It has also been characterized as a metaphor for the loss of historical memory: the dripping in Liu's paintings is described by art critic Bill Berkson as "analogous to memory" and how "[memory] is blurred." Given the pathos that often infuses her works, her painting style has been described by Liu's partner, critic and curator Jeff Kelley, as a kind of "weeping realism."

Hung Liu - Chinese Profile II, 1998. Oil on canvas, 80 x 80 in. Collection of San Jose Museum of Art.

Many works were drawn from the artist's personal collection of 19th century Chinese photographs, a large portion of which feature prostitutes. Liu believed her paintings "gives a spirit to them, the forgotten." As curator Réne de Guzman writes, her paintings bring details of Chinese history and memory into the present for American viewer. Writing for the San Francisco Museum of Modern Art, Kelley suggests that Liu's paintings "challenge the documentary authority of historical photographs by subjecting them to the more reflective process of painting [...] Much of the meaning in her paintings comes from the way the washes and drips dissolve the photo-based images, suggesting the passage of memory into history."

Since the late 1990s, Liu has occasionally taken historical photographs of non-Chinese women, refugees, migrants, workers, and children as a point of departure. Her Strange Fruit paintings of the early to mid 2000s depicted Korean "comfort women" forced to serve as prostitutes for Japanese soldiers in the second World War. Several of her paintings draw imagery from the portrait and documentary photographs of the Chinese populace by John Thomson. In her American Exodus series, Liu addresses American subject matter, creating images of the Dust Bowl and the Great Depression after the photographs of Dorothea Lange.

Pieces such as Goddess of Love/Goddess of Liberty incorporate significant mixed-media elements (often antique or hand-made objects) either installed in close proximity to or mounted directly onto the piece. Liu cited her installation work as a continuation of the principles she utilized as a muralist "an ability to work in large scale and to take the site specificity of the situation into account. Creating an installation merely required pushing the work out into the third dimension". Liu's paintings also often incorporate a sculptural dimensionality through the use of custom canvases shaped to the contours of their subject matter.

=== My Secret Freedom paintings ===
Liu also disobeyed the ban against non-sanctioned art of the Maoist regime in her series called "My Secret Freedom". These miniature landscape paintings, created during Liu's time at Da Dulianghe, depict scenes of everyday life. Their title refers to the rebellion inherent in their creation: Liu had to hide a small paint box and brushes beneath her coat and painted each tiny image quickly. Jeff Kelley writes that Liu's "intent was radical in China at the time: to paint not in the service of state ideology or party dicta, but simply to paint. To paint for the sheer pleasure of painting." It was announced in 2018 that the San Francisco Museum of Modern Art had acquired the entire "My Secret Freedom" series.

=== Immigration and Resident Alien exhibition ===
Liu immigrated to the United States in 1984. She is a class of 1986 alumna of the University of California, San Diego.

As resident artist at Capp Street Project in San Francisco in 1988, Liu painted a series of works whose main focus was the issue of identity as it relates to immigrant status. Among these was the eponymous Resident Alien. This was Liu's first self-portrait, in which the artist painted an enlarged version of her own green card with several pointed changes, e.g. her birthdate of 1948 becoming 1984, the date of her immigration, and her name comically replaced by the words "Fortune Cookie". The off-site exhibition of these works brought Liu her first major art world attention; the painting Resident Alien also subsequently received numerous treatments and interpretations by scholars of gender identity and women's studies as well as art historians. Dong Isbister proposes that Resident Alien is best understood via a 'diasporic consciousness,' as Liu asks her audience to "examine how her body is positioned and portrayed in relation to legal, racial, and gender issues based on immigration." The painting evidences the "tension between an ethnic, a national and a transnational identity"; at the same time, Liu "shows resistance to being assimilated into the stereotypes imposed upon her by inserting her own voice." In 1988, as part of her Capp Street Project residency, Liu produced a mural, Reading Room, for the Chinese for Affirmative Action Community Room in San Francisco's Chinatown.

=== "Jiu Jin Shan (Old Gold Mountain)" ===
Hung Liu's installation Jiu Jin Shan (Old Gold Mountain), 1994/2013, at the Mills College Art Museum. Photo by Phil Bond.

Liu's installation work Jiu Jin Shan (Old Gold Mountain) (1994) was originally commissioned by the M.H. de Young Memorial Museum. In this work, Liu created a "gold mountain" made of 200,000 fortune cookies, engulfing a crossroads of railroad tracks. The junction of the tracks references the cultural intersection of East and West, as well as the Chinese immigrants who perished during the building of the Sierra Nevada stage of the transcontinental railroad. Jiu Jin Shan (Old Gold Mountain) was also installed at the Mills College Art Museum in 2013 as part of the exhibition Hung Liu: Offerings.

=== Going Away, Coming Home airport installation ===
In November 2006, Liu's public art installation Going Away, Coming Home was unveiled at the Oakland International Airport. The installation is a 160-foot long wall of windows in the Terminal 2 concourse. The installation was commissioned by the Port of Oakland for $300,000.

The installation depicts 80 cranes that are meant to comfort and give blessings to people who are leaving their homes or returning from travel. Liu was inspired by a silk Chinese scroll painting from the 12th century, which also depicts cranes symbolizing good luck. Liu painted the work with enamel in her signature style of allowing the paint to drip. To make the work, she collaborated with the 140-year-old German glass fabrication company Derix Glasstudios.

=== Summoning Ghosts retrospective ===
Summoning Ghosts: The Art of Hung Liu was a retrospective collection of Liu's work, including around 80 paintings and an assortment of photographs, studies, and sketchbooks. It remains the most extensive exhibit of her work to date, with paintings from more than 40 collections displayed. The exhibit featured works from throughout Liu's artistic career, beginning from the late 1960s; these paintings draw upon her personal history and experience of the Maoist regime, the Great Leap Forward, and the Cultural Revolution, as well as drawing from themes of Ancient China. Réne de Guzman, the chief curator at the Oakland Museum of California, organized the exhibit in collaboration with Hung Liu. The artist describes the exhibit as a "…full circle… [Comprising] where I come from, what I was interested in, and what was possible to do in China."

=== Three Fujins ===
Three Fujins is an oil on canvas painting by Liu, and is currently on display at the Memorial Art Gallery in Rochester, New York. It was finished in 2015 and was put on display at the Memorial Art Gallery in 2016. The dimensions of the painting are 96 x 256 x 12 in (243.8 x 320 x 30.5 cm).

This piece depicts three women adorned in Qing dynasty robes, their clothing and makeup suggesting they are concubines. These concubines each hold fans in their laps, sitting symmetrical to each other and facing the observer. All of the concubines are sitting on a singular bench with little room between each other. From the painting's surface extends three bird cages, each cage extending from its respective concubine, giving the painting a distinct three-dimensional aspect.

Liu was born under the Maoist regime, and the influence of her environment growing up is evident in this particular work. It is strikingly similar to another painting of hers, "The Ocean Is The Dragon's World", which depicts the Dowager Empress Cixi. She similarly has a birdcage extending from the canvas of the painting as well, showing that though she is in a position of power, she is still confined to the role of a woman of her time.

Using the style of photorealism, Liu bases her paintings off the people in historical photographs that she has taken or others have. These subjects are most often those who have no record of existing, citing that she views her pieces as a type of "memorial site" for the subjects. She often paints directly from these pictures, adding flourishes of her own, such as color, texture, flowers, birds, and other "decorative motifs".

Liu's signature technique was "Weeping Realism", one that she pioneered herself. Weeping Realism takes the realistic and lifelike figures of her paintings and overlays a liberal amount of linseed oil drip over the wet paint, causing the colors to bleed down the canvas and make the crisp image much harder to discern at first glance.

== Awards and achievements ==
Liu has received numerous awards, including two painting fellowships from the National Endowment for the Arts and a Joan Mitchell Fellowship. In 2011 she received an SGC International Award for Lifetime Achievement in Printmaking from the Southern Graphics Council. Other awards include a Society for the Encouragement of Contemporary Art (SECA) award and a Eureka Fellowship.

She was the Professor Emerita of Painting at Mills College in Oakland, California, where she taught from 1990 until retiring in 2014.

== Death ==
Liu died from pancreatic cancer on 7 August 2021 in Oakland, California. At the time of her death, the De Young Museum in San Francisco had a collection of her work on exhibit. The exhibition ran until 7 August 2022. Liu was in the process of developing an exhibition at the Smithsonian's National Portrait Gallery before her death. Hung Liu: Portraits of Promised Lands opened on 27 August 2021 and closed on 30 May 2022.

== Collections ==
Liu's work is held in the following public collections:

- National Museum of Women in the Arts, Washington, DC
- San Francisco Museum of Modern Art, San Francisco, California
- Oakland Museum of California, Oakland, California
- Whitney Museum of American Art, New York, New York
- Metropolitan Museum of Art, New York, New York
- National Gallery of Art, Washington, D.C.
- Asian Art Museum, San Francisco, California
- Los Angeles County Museum of Art, Los Angeles, California
- San Jose Museum of Art, San Jose, California
- University of Oregon Museum of Art, Eugene, Oregon
- Muscarelle Museum of Art, Williamsburg, Virginia

== Exhibitions ==
Liu's work has appeared in exhibitions and venues including the following:

- Portraiture Exhibition, Winter Palace Gallery, Beijing, China; 1978
- National Fine Arts Colleges Exhibition, a traveling group show in China; 1980
- Two Lovers 两个爱人; 1980
- The Music of the Great Earth 神州律吕行, Mural Central Academy of Fine Arts, Beijing; 1981
- Resident Alien 常住的外来者, San Jose Museum of Art, California; 1988
- Chinese Pieta (mixed-media installation), The Women's Building, Los Angeles, California; 1989
- Goddesses of Love and Liberty, Nahan Contemporary Gallery, New York City; 1989
- Precarious Links: Emily Jennings, Hung Liu, and Celia Munoz, San Antonio Museum of Art, San Antonio, Texas and Lawndale Art and Performance Center, Houston, Texas; 1990
- Decoding Gender, School 33 Art Center, Baltimore, Maryland; 1992 (curated by Robert Atkins)
- 43rd Biennial of Contemporary American Painting, Corcoran Gallery of Art, Washington, DC; 1993
- In Transit, New Museum, New York City; 1993
- Year of the Dog, Steinbaum Krauss Gallery, New York City; 1994
- See-Saw 跷跷板; 1994
- Twelve Bay Area Painters: The Eureka Fellowship Winners, San Jose Museum of Art, California; 1994
- The Last Dynasty, Steinbaum Krauss Gallery, New York City; 1995
- Parameters: Hung Liu, Chrysler Museum of Art, Norfolk, Virginia; 1995-1996
- Gender Beyond Memory, Tokyo Photographic Art Museum, Tokyo, Japan; 1996
- American Kaleidoscope: Art At The Close Of This Century, Smithsonian American Art Museum, Washington, DC; 1996
- American Stories: Amidst Displacement and Transformation, various venues in Japan (traveling) 1997-1998 including Setagaya Art Museum, Tokyo; Chiba City Museum, Chiba; Fukui Fine Arts Museum, Fukui; Kurashiki Art City Museum, Kurashiki; Atorion, Akita
- Hung Liu: A Ten-Year Survey, 1988-1998, College of Wooster Art Museum, Wooster, Ohio (March–June 1998); Muscarelle Museum of Art, Williamsburg, Virginia (August–October 1998); Kemper Museum of Contemporary Art, Kansas City, Missouri (November–December 1998); University of California, San Diego, La Jolla, California (January–March 1999); Bowdoin College Museum of Art, Brunswick, Maine (April–June 1999); and Ackland Art Museum, Chapel Hill, North Carolina (September–November 1999).
- New Work: Painting Today, Recent Acquisitions, San Francisco Museum of Modern Art, California; 1999-2000
- Where is Mao? 2000, The Art Center, Center of Academic Resources, Chulalongkom University, Bangkok, Thailand; 2000
- Text and Subtext: Contemporary Art and Asian Women, various venues (traveling) 2000-2003 including Earl Lu Gallery, La Salle-Sia College of the Arts, Singapore; Ivan Dougherty Gallery, University of New South Wales, Sydney Australia; Artspace, Sydney, Australia; Museum of Far East Antiquities, Stockholm, Sweden; Stenersen Museum, Stockholm, Sweden; Nikolaj Copenhagen Contemporary Art Centre, Copenhagen, Denmark; Taipei Fine Arts Museum, Taipei, Taiwan; X-Ray Art Centre, Beijing, China
- Art/Women/California: Parallels and Intersections, 1950-2000, San Jose Museum of Art, California; 2002
- Strange Fruit: New Paintings by Hung Liu, Arizona State University Art Museum, Tempe, Arizona (26 January – 28 April 2002); Boise Art Museum, Boise, Idaho (1 June – 4 August 2002); Laguna Art Museum, Laguna Beach, California (27 October – 23 February 2003); and Crocker Art Museum, Sacramento, California (8 March – 4 May 2003).
- Hung Liu: Toward Peng-Lai (Paradise), Rena Bransten Gallery, San Francisco, California; 2003
- Visual Politics: the Art of Engagement, San Jose Museum of Art, California; 2005-2006
- Re-presenting the Chinese in the American West; University of Wyoming Museum of Art, Laramie, Wyoming; 2006
- Daughters of China, Rena Bransten Gallery, San Francisco, California; 2007
- Tai Cang (Great Granary), Xin Beijing Art Gallery (XBAG), Beijing, China; 2008
- Prodigal Daughter, F2 Gallery, Beijing, China; 2008
- Richter Scale 里氏震级, Bernice Steinbaum Gallery, New York City; 2009
- Qi Bu (Seven Steps to Heaven) 七步(七步上天堂), Rena Bransten Gallery, San Francisco, California; 2009
- Half-Life of a Dream: Contemporary Chinese Art from the Logan Collection, San Francisco Museum of Modern Art, California; 2008
- First Spring Thunder, Alexander Ochs Gallery, Beijing, China; 2011
- Culture Revolution: Contemporary Chinese Paintings from the Allen Memorial Art Museum, Akron Art Museum, Ohio; 2011
- SGC International Award Exhibition, Sam Fox School of Design & Visual Arts, Washington University in St. Louis, Missouri; 2011
- CYCLE 輪回: New Works by Hung Liu, di Rosa Art Preserve, Napa, California; 2012
- Happy and Gay, Rena Bransten Gallery, San Francisco, California; 2012
- Gold, Belvedere Museum, Vienna, Austria; 2012
- The Female Gaze: Women Artists Making Their World, Pennsylvania Academy of the Fine Arts; 2012-2013
- I, You, We, Whitney Museum of American Art, New York City; 2013
- Hung Liu: Offerings; Mills College Art Museum, Oakland, California; 2013
- Qianshan: Grandfather's Mountain, Nancy Hoffman Gallery, New York City; 2013
- Summoning Ghosts, Oakland Museum of California from 16 March 2013; then travelled to Kemper Museum of Contemporary Art, October 2014 and toured, finishing its tour at Palm Springs Art Museum.
- The Rat Years, Huntington Museum of Art, West Virginia; 2014
- Marks Made: Prints by American Women Artists from the 1960s to the Present, Museum of Fine Arts, St Petersburg, Florida; 2015
- Hung Liu: Daughter of China, Resident Alien; American University Museum at the Katzen Art Center, Washington, DC; 2016 (curated by Peter Selz)
- American Exodus, Nancy Hoffman Gallery, New York City; 2016
- Hung Liu: Scales of History, Fresno Art Museum, California; 2016-2017
- Unthinkable Tenderness, Walter Maciel Gallery, Los Angeles, California; 2018
- Promised Land, Rena Bransten Gallery, San Francisco, California; 2017
- Women with Vision, Muscarelle Museum of Art, Williamsburg, Virginia; 2018
- Hung Liu: Portraits of Promised Lands, National Portrait Gallery, Washington, DC, 2021
- Remember This: Hung Liu at Trillium, University of Oregon Museum of Art, Eugene, Oregon; 2022
- Hung Liu: Making History, National Museum of Women in the Arts, 2023-2024
- Spirit in the Land, Nasher Museum of Art at Duke University, Durham, North Carolina; 2023, and Pérez Art Museum Miami, Florida; 2024

An exhibition titled Hung Liu: Passers-by, scheduled for the Ullens Center for Contemporary Art in Beijing, China, in 2019 was canceled by the Beijing Municipal Bureau of Culture because of the content of some paintings.

== Publications ==
- Sui, Jianguo et al. Hung Liu: Great Granary. Blue Kingfisher, 2011
- Roth, David; "Hung Liu @ Oakland Museum." Square Cylinder, 18 April 2013
- Liu, Hung. Questions from the Sky. Hardy Marks Publications, 2015
- Kelley, Jeff et al. Daughter of China, Resident Alien. American University Museum at the Katzen Art Center, Washington, D.C. 2016
- Hickey, Dave; 25 Women: Essays on Their Work. University of Chicago Press, 2016
- Gouma-Peterson, Thalia et al. Hung Liu: A Ten-Year Survey 1988-1998. College of Wooster Art Museum, Wooster, MA, 1998
- de Guzman, Rene et al. Summoning Ghosts: The Art of Hung Liu. University of California Press, 2013
- Moss, Dorothy et al. Hung Liu: Portraits of Promised Lands. Yale University Press, Published in association with the National Portrait Gallery, Smithsonian Institution, Washington, DC, 29 June 2021
