= Robert Morrison (artist) =

Nevada sculptor and visual artist

Robert Morrison (October 20, 1941 – December 16, 2018) was an American artist and teacher. His practice spanned a broad range of media including steel, bronze, wood, watercolor, ink, paper, graphite drawings, acrylic paintings, glass and ceramics. He became widely known for his elaborate installations fashioned from sheet metal and other materials, many of which included sound as an integral element of the work. His installations were considered "among the strongest works of contemporary sculpture to be made in Nevada."

He earned his BA Degree in Art at Fresno State University in 1962 and his master's degree in Design at Stanford University. He taught art at University of California, Davis, and then went to work at University of Nevada, Reno as an Art Professor in 1967, where he made a lasting impression on students. His major public art commissions include a statue of Abraham Curry in front of the Nevada State Capitol in Carson City as well as the Fleischmann Planetarium Sundial at the University of Nevada, Reno. His most extensive exhibition, Robert Morrison: A Retrospective, included three decades of work from 1968-1998 and opened at Nevada Museum of Art in 2004.

== Artistry ==
Robert Morrison started his career as a painter in the 1960s. Frustrated that paintings could not achieve genuine flatness, he turned to sculpture, sandblasting images on opposing surfaces of glass cubes to evoke the 'negative space of sculpture." Influenced by musicians John Cage and Steve Reich, concrete texts by Emmett Williams and Ian Hamilton Finlay, and the aleatory works of poet Jackson MacLow, his focus shifted in the 1970s into creating video and performance art. He worked with televisions and reel to reel recorders to investigate the hypnotic qualities of repeated sound in the forms of spoken words and phrases on video and audio tape loops.

In 1982, Morrison participated at an experimental poetry performance series called Pigeons at Pipers at Piper's Opera House in Virginia City. Placing four tape recorders on the floor, he threaded blank recording tape in a loop through the machines, turned on both the microphones and the speakers, and hit the start buttons. The tape, picking up dust and debris from the floorboards, made "appaling sounds upon reaching the heads of the machines—sounds recorded and added to and played back by each machine in a building crescendo of unbearable ambient magnitude." This work, according to art critic William L. Fox, "gave the space a voice without any specific authorship by the artist" and "exhibited many of the tensions that would inhabit Morrison's work for the next two decades."

Throughout the 1980s, Morrison turned to creating "sound pieces—large, labor-intensive installations that explore the concept of how sound can affect our sense of space." Working mostly with steel, fiberglass, and radio wire, his sculptures symbolized how figures are "bound in media, trying to speak." The central and "exasperating paradox" of his work emerged when the sculptural material acts as "a resistance to speech." According to American writer Rebecca Solnit, Morrison's work "often explores 'how uncomfortably we occupy' our bodies and our world."

Throughout his career, Morrison's work was in conversation with contemporary artists such as Bruce Nauman, Bill Fontana, and Paul Kos. Although his "heritage was modernist abstraction," his works uniquely played with conceptualist and Dada techniques such as "temporality, chance and wit." As art critic Jeff Kelley writes, Morrison's "struggle to navigate between the extremes of self and society, figuration and abstraction, speech and muteness, and even life and death" pushed his art towards a "threshold" where it "either hardens into forms of modernist denial or softens into an atmosphere of fleeting information, some of which we need to hear, some of which is scary, most of which we miss." In this way, Morrison is "both a sculptor and a performance artist" who lived and worked "at the margins of the mainstream art world."

== Major sound works ==
In 1983, Morrison showed Mumbles at the Sheppard Fine Arts Gallery at the University of Nevada, Reno. According to Jeff Kelley, the piece 'invokes space as it exists beyond human perceptual limits.' Ten steel plates, cut and folded in geometric shapes, hung from the walls, each with a thin metal rod welded to it. Speaker wires ran from these rods to stereo receivers and amplifiers in a hidden room that transmitted various radio signals into the steel plates, causing them to vibrate like "highly imperfect speakers." As William L. Fox writes, Mumbles "evok[es] that mildly euphoric and pleasurable reverie we derive [from] ... serial Modernism ... but the anxiety produced by an anonymous agent voicing into space ... mitigates against mistaking these for decorative late Modernism. They would drive you nuts."

In 1985, supported by grants from the Nevada State Council of the Arts and the National Endowment for the Arts, Morrison created a site-specific sound sculpture called River Thrum for the Sierra Nevada Museum of Art (now called Nevada Museum of Art). According to Jeff Kelley, the piece looked like a 'futuristic sailing device' that made "twitching, crusty, distant metallic sound... from an apparatus designed to catch and register the ambient wind and river currents." Morrison achieved this effect through wind passing through perforations in iron plates as well as fishing lines that ran from the riverbed to the sculptures armature and tugged on the work, ringing it "as if a bell."

In 1986, Morrison completed a large sculpture and sound installation, Tongues: The Half-Life of Morphine, for the Center for Research in Contemporary Art in Arlington, Texas. The piece was inspired by a period of Morrison's life as he recovered from a leg injury during a wind-surfing accident in Hawaii. Needing a bone graft and medicated with opiates, Morrison came up with and fabricated Tongues. The piece consisted of 36 steel cots, each with a steel pillow that "looks soft enough to fall asleep on." Like earlier pieces, wires rest on the pillows and "jitter nervously" through the sculptures with sounds generated by a synthesizer out of sight in another room. The effect evokes "a critique of the Modernist inability to represent completely the human condition" while "acting as a metaphor of Morrison's impaired physical and psychological condition."

In 1989, Morrison made O'Coeur. The name comes from a chant that Jean-Paul Marat's followers intoned as they sat under the heart of their assassinated revolutionary leader suspended in an urn from the ceiling of their meeting place. In O'Coeur, twelve narrow steel tubs filled halfway with water sit within claustrophobic wire screen booths. These tubs, the same dimensions as the tub Marat spent most of his time in, cultivated a "mineral scum" analogous to Marat's "scrofulous skin disease." Above each tub hung a lit electric light bulb. This symbolic eclectic heart "creates a frisson between the supposedly redemptive powers of the bath and the ambiance of an electric chair." The piece was also a comment on the AIDS crisis and its devastating effects on artistic communities at that time: an "ablution for all the dead and dying."

In 1992, Morrison showed M. Hasard, his last planned sound piece. Named after one of Marcel Duchamp's pseudonyms, the piece consisted of three steel chairs hanging on a wall, large steel shelves holding homburg hats in the middle of the room, and 11 "Sanitary Aprons" hanging on the opposite wall. In homage to his artistic legacy (via evocations of cubism via Pablo Picasso, surrealism via Duchamp, and the social sculpture of Joseph Beuys), the piece evokes Morrison's "personal art history codified, filtered, and serialized" with the artist's characteristic sound, a "raspy chatter" from steel wires in the shelves that "picks up random martial cadences every minute or so." The water that flows through channel-like slits in the piece vibrated to the sound, marking the passage of time like a "primitive clock" and a "record of the destructiveness of time itself."

== Exhibits ==
Morrison is credited with 142 solo and group exhibitions from 1962-2012. Notable exhibits include:

- 2004: "Robert Morrison: A Retrospective" at Nevada Museum of Art (Reno, NV)
- 1998: "Eating Monkey Brains, The Baboon Nurse and Other Tales" at Museum of Contemporary Art (Palm Beach Community College, Lake Worth, FL)
- 1992: "Solo Exhibition" at Foster Goldstrom Gallery (New York, NY)
- 1986: "Tongues: The Half Life of Morphine" at Center for Research in the Visual Arts (University of Texas, Arlington)
- 1985: "River Thrum" at Sierra Nevada Museum of Art (Reno, NV)
- 1983: "Sound Sculptures" at University of Nevada, Las Vegas
- 1979: "Install and Dedication of Abraham Curry Statue" at Capitol Plaza (Carson City, NV)
- 1968: "Solo Exhibition" at Fresno Art Center (Fresno, CA)

== Legacy ==
His archives are held at the Nevada Museum of Art and include documents, slides, photographs, notebooks, correspondence, grants, videotapes, paintings, drawings, technical drawings, and exhibition ephemera.

== Major awards ==
- 1991 National Endowment for the Arts Grant
- 1990 National Endowment for the Arts Fellowship: Individual Artist Award
- 1990 Sierra Arts Foundation Artist Grant
- 1990 Nevada Arts Council Visual Arts Award
