= Operation Neptune (New Zealand) =

New Zealand International Naval Review
- Date: 8 February – 18 December 2016
- Venue: Devonport Naval Base and Auckland Harbour
- Also known as: 75th Anniversary of the Royal New Zealand Navy
- Type: Naval Review
- Theme: Military
- Organised by: Royal New Zealand Navy

Operation Neptune was a programme of commemorative events and activities held in New Zealand throughout the year 2016 to celebrate the 75th anniversary of the establishment of the Royal New Zealand Navy in 1941.

Royal New Zealand Navy Ensign

The name “Operation Neptune” was chosen to commemorate the greatest single loss sustained by the New Zealand Navy. HMS Neptune was being prepared for transfer to the Royal New Zealand Navy when she sank after hitting an enemy minefield in the Mediterranean on 19 December 1941 with the loss of all but one man, including all 150 of the New Zealanders who had already joined the ship.

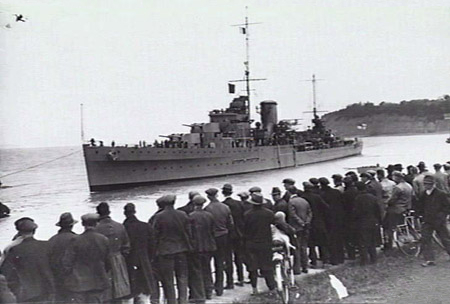
HMS Neptune in 1937

== History ==
Initially established as a division of the Royal Navy in the early 1900s, it was not until 1 October 1941, that His Majesty King George VI approved the designation “Royal New Zealand Navy” for the regular element of the New Zealand Naval Forces; including Reserve and Volunteer Reserve elements.

== Events ==
=== Through year ===
On 22 January, the Devonport Naval Base was opened to the public for the first time in two years.

The year-long celebrations started on 8 February, when the Royal New Zealand Navy performed a 'Navy Formation Entry' into Auckland Harbour, declaring the start of the Naval Celebrations. The formation included a 17-gun salute undertaken by HMNZS Canterbury whilst passing by the Devonport Naval Base. The salute was reciprocated with an 11-gun salute fired from HMNZS Te Mana, who was berthed at Devonport Naval Base. The salute was to celebrate the appointment of the new-Chief of Navy John Martin, OMNZ

On 20 February 90 sailors stationed on HMNZS Canterbury completed a march through Rangiora, New Zealand.

Through March, HMNZS Manawanui organised a public visit to Gisborne, New Zealand, and hosted two local high schools on deck, Illminster Intermediate School and Tairawhiti Services Academy, before attending the local boys and girls high schools, Gisborne Boys' High School and Gisborne Girls' High School to speak about careers in the Navy.

On 1 October, The New Zealand Naval Ensign was flown on the Auckland Harbour Bridge to commemorate the 75th Anniversary of the Royal New Zealand Navy. It was passed through Auckland by-law's that the Naval Ensign will fly on the Harbour Bridge every 1 October from 2016 onward.

=== Naval plays ===
The Royal New Zealand Navy has commissioned Lt. Cdr. Mark Hadlow with the creation of two theatrical plays, The Complete History of the Royal New Zealand Navy, a light-hearted look at the Navy and its history, and Commander Claire and Pirates of Provence, a play for children.

The play, The Complete History of the Royal New Zealand Navy runs for about an hour and a quarter and focuses on the Naval History from Captain Cook to the present day celebrations of Operation Neptune. The play includes William Edward Sanders’ encounter with a German U-boat and it is delivered entirely in jack-speak – navy slang – with a translation thrown in. Also in the play, within the WWII portion, it features the Battle of the River Plate, with a hilarious comparison of gun sizes before the German raider is brought down to size.

=== International naval review weekend ===
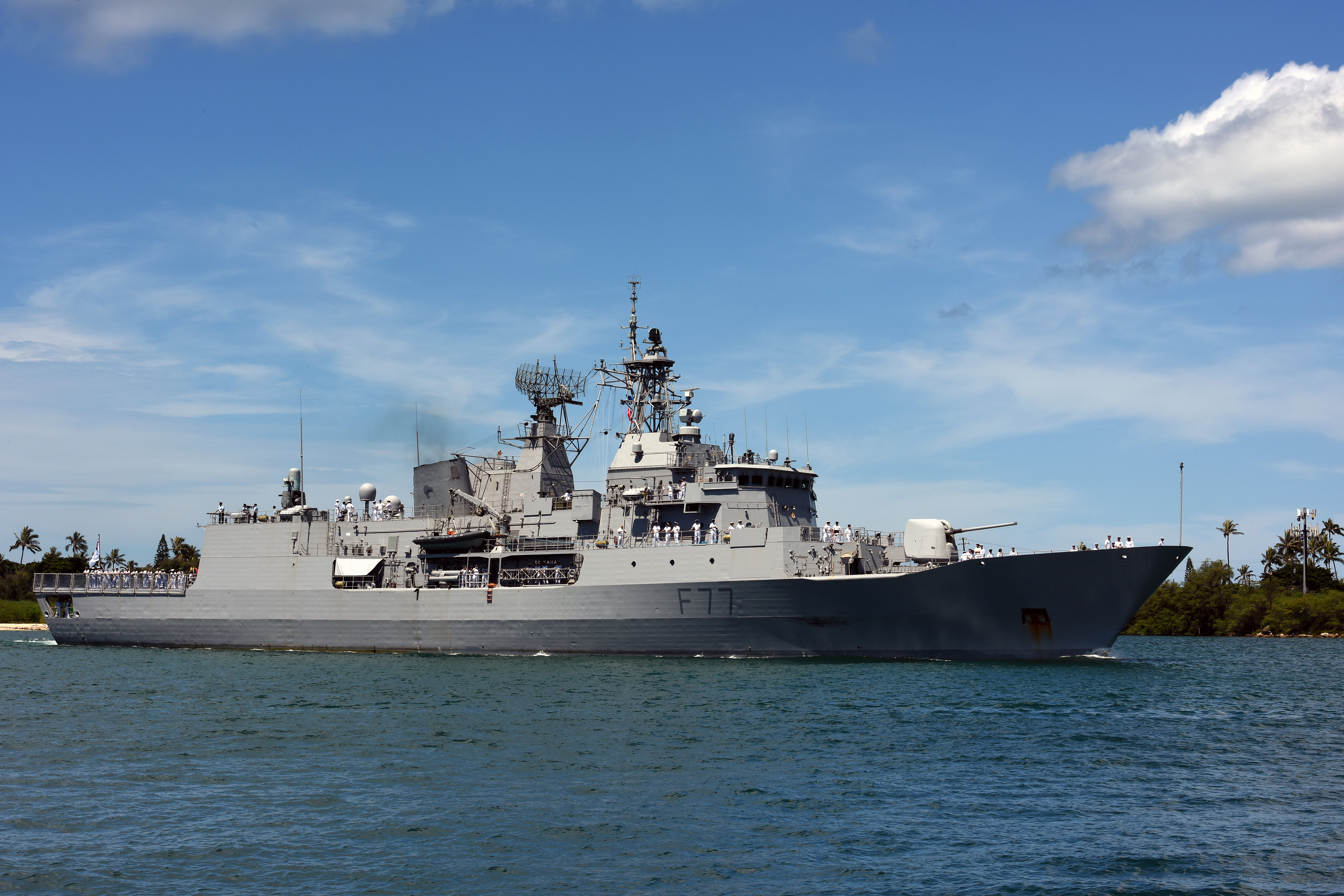
HMNZS Te Kaha in 2016

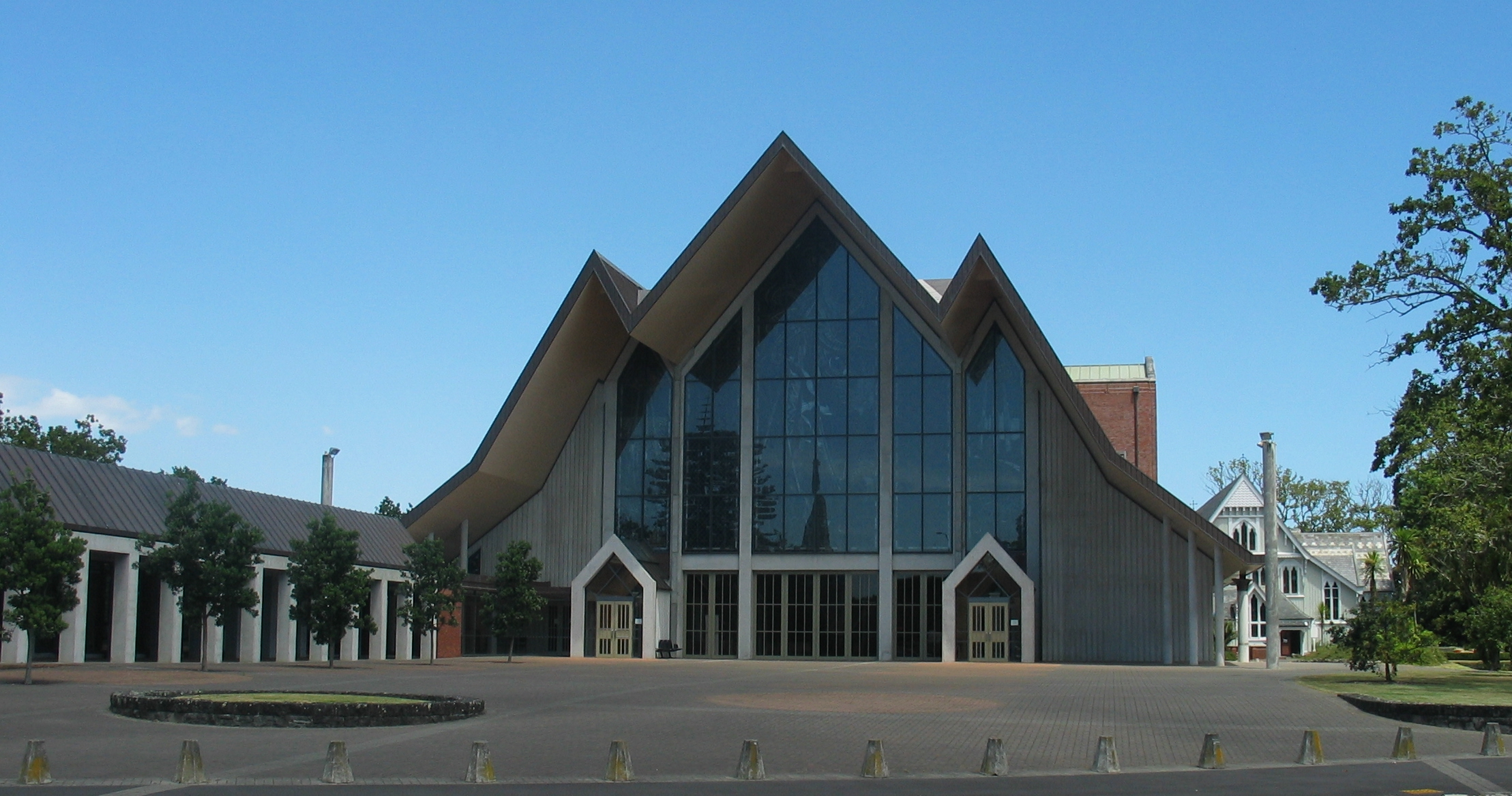
Holy Trinity Cathedral, Parnell, Auckland.

Event	Date(s)	Description	Notes
Fleet entry	17 November 2016	New Zealand and International Navy assets enter the Auckland Harbour and berth in the Ports of Auckland and the Devonport Naval Base. A gun salute will occur from the deck of HMNZS Te Kaha for each ship entering the harbour.	
International street march	18 November 2016	The Royal New Zealand Navy will carry out a 1,000-sailor International Naval Review Street Parade to be reviewed by the Mayor of Auckland. The Parade will also feature contingents from foreign military institutes.	
International naval review	19 November 2016	The Naval Review will feature Her Excellency the Governor-General of New Zealand reviewing the Royal New Zealand Navy and visiting ships.	
Open day for visitors	20 November 2016	The Open day will provide a rare and unique experience for the New Zealand public due to the fact that the Navy as well as Visiting Nations will provide open access to all assets on show to the public. Countries and Territories participating in the open day include, Australia, Canada, China, Chile, Cook Islands, India, Indonesia, Japan, South Korea, Samoa, Tonga, and the United States of America.	
Divine service	20 November 2016	A memorial service to those lost in the 1941 sinking of HMS Neptune in the Mediterranean. Held at Holy Trinity Cathedral in Parnell. Will be attended by all visiting military personnel.	
Fleet departure	22 November 2016	All Military Vessels and Assets leave Auckland Harbour, except those stationed at Devonport Naval Base.	

== Participation ==
Ships from Australia, Canada, Cook Islands, Chile, China, India, Indonesia, Japan, Samoa, Singapore, South Korea, Tonga, and the United States have started arriving to help the Navy celebrate its milestone. Brunei, France, Germany, Papua New Guinea, Thailand, Timor Leste, the United Kingdom, and Vietnam are also sending representatives to the celebration but not ships.

=== New Zealand ===
All active ships of the Royal New Zealand Navy will be participating, as well as two Kaman SH-2G Super Seasprite naval helicopters and one Lockheed P-3 Orion Naval plane.

=== Australia ===
Australia is sending multiple Royal Australian Navy vessels including, but not limited to HMAS Dechaineux, which arrived at Devonport Naval Base on 3 November.

=== United States ===
On 21 July 2016, it was announced that then-Vice President Joe Biden, while on a diplomatic visit to New Zealand, had accepted an invitation for a US Naval vessel to visit New Zealand and participate in the 75th Anniversary celebrations. This was surprising to the New Zealand public due to the fact that the United States of America had not sent any of its Naval forces to New Zealand since 1987.

It was announced on 18 October 2016 that the United States would send USS Sampson along with full-crew of roughly 310 soldiers.

== Kaikōura earthquake ==
Several ships attending the anniversary were re-deployed, by their respective Governments, to help with the 2016 Kaikōura earthquake recovery efforts. These Ships are New Zealand's HMNZS Te Kaha, HMNZS Canterbury, HMNZS Endeavor, and HMNZS Wellington. International fleet include, United States Navy ship USS Sampson, Royal Australian Navy ship HMAS Darwin, and Royal Canadian Navy ship HMCS Vancouver.

On 15 November, the Japanese Navy and Singaporean Government's request to help was granted by the Acting Minister of Civil Defense, Gerry Brownlee.
