= Rex Fell =

Rex Selwyn Fell (1944 or 1945 – 22 April 2016) was a New Zealand breeder of Thoroughbred racehorses.

Fell was one of twin sons born to Arthur Fell, founder of Fairdale Stud at Longburn, and his wife Joan. His greatest success as a breeder came with the gelding Hyperno, winner of the 1979 Melbourne Cup and other group and listed races. After a 45-year partnership in Fairdale Stud with his father Arthur and brother Gerald, Fell established Goodwood Stud with his son, William, in 2007.

As well as being a breeder, Fell was involved in horseracing administration, serving as the president of the Manawatu Racing Club.

Fell died at Palmerston North on 22 April 2016, aged 71.
