= Margaret Baird =

New Zealand immunologist (1945–2016)

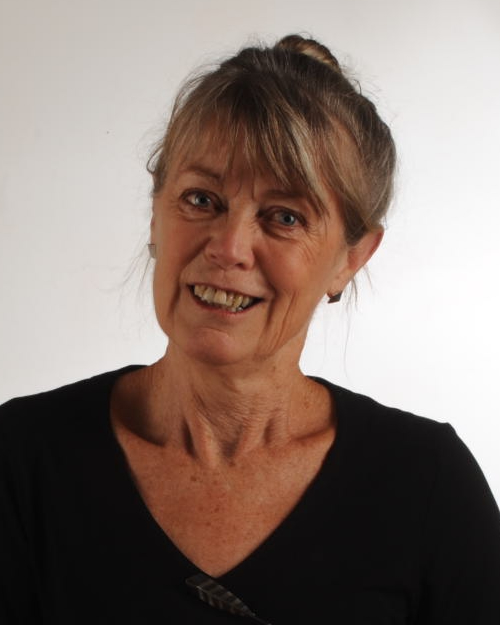
- Baird in 2011
- Born: Margaret Alison McIntyre; 1945; Wellington, New Zealand
- Died: 19 September 2016 (aged 71); Dunedin, New Zealand
- Education: University of Otago
- Scientific career
- Workplaces: University of Otago
- Thesis: Survival of syngeneic and allogeneic erythrocytes in rats (1983)

Margaret Alison Baird (née McIntyre; 1945 – 19 September 2016) was a New Zealand immunologist. She was a full professor in the Department of Microbiology and Immunology at the University of Otago. Her research considered dendritic cells and their role in cancer and infectious disease.

== Early life and education ==
Baird was the daughter of Hazel and Alan McIntyre, and grew up in Tauranga, a small town that is on the North Island of New Zealand. She attended the University of Otago, where she studied zoology and graduated in 1967. After graduating, Baird worked as a high school teacher, teaching biology at St Hilda's Collegiate School. She developed debating and drama programs for the school students. Her husband joined the King George VI School in Honiara in 1970, and soon after Baird followed to teach science and art. In 1972 she returned to New Zealand, where she worked as a Speech and Drama teacher. Baird became interested in microbiology and enrolled on a postgraduate course in immunology at the University of Otago. She was the only woman and oldest person on the course. She eventually started a doctoral degree in transplant immunology, working with Barbara Heslop at the University of Otago. In 1984 she earned her PhD, and later that year coordinated an important immunology meeting in Queenstown. The 1985 meeting would lead to the formation of the Australia and New Zealand Society for Immunology.

== Research and career ==
Baird investigated dendritic cells. She was made a lecturer in the Microbiology Department at the University of Otago, where she investigated the role of dendritic cells in infectious diseases and cancer. She was promoted to Professor in 2011.

When Baird retired in 2012 she was made a part time Professor in the Department of Pathology at the University of Otago. In this capacity she studied the role of p53 in tumour suppression. She also studied how p53 was involved in the regulation of dendritic cell function.

=== Academic service ===
Baird taught immunology courses at the University of Otago. In 2013 she was the first New Zealander to be awarded the Derrick Rowley Medal, which represents outstanding service to Immunology and the Australia and New Zealand Society for Immunology.

== Death and legacy ==
Baird died in Dunedin on 19 September 2016, at the age of 71.

In 2019, the Australia and New Zealand Society for Immunology established the Margaret Baird Women in Immunology Award. The award is worth $5,000 AUD to fund a trans-Tasman lectureship. This lectureship will involve a series of guest lectures across New Zealand and Australia, focusing on the applicant's research, but also including perspectives on equity and balance in science careers.
