= Jeff Kelley =

American art critic, author, and curator

- Occupations: Curator, Art critic, Author
- Notable work: Childsplay: The Art of Allan Kaprow; Essays on the Blurring of Art and Life

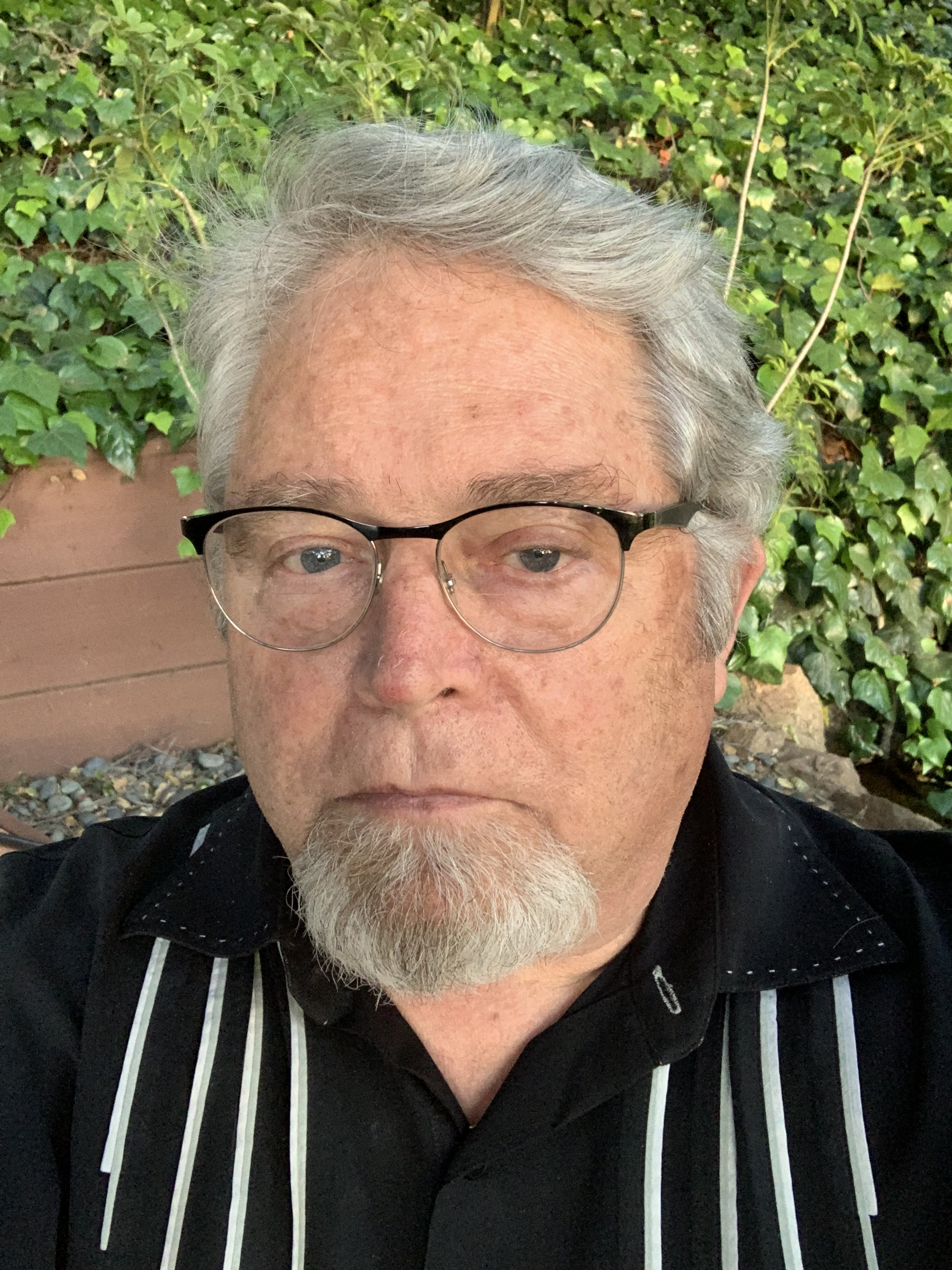

Jeff Kelley is an art critic, author, and curator. A practicing art critic since 1977, his reviews and essays about artists including Chinese conceptual artist Ai Weiwei have appeared in publications including Artforum, Art in America, and the Los Angeles Times.

In 1993 the University of California Press published Essays on the Blurring of Art and Life, a collection of significant writings by American conceptual artist Allan Kaprow edited by Kelley. He is also the author of Childsplay: the Art of Allan Kaprow, published in 2004 by UC Press.

Kelley lives in Oakland, California. He was married to Chinese-born American painter Hung Liu until her death on August 7, 2021.

== Selected exhibitions ==
Between 1998 and 2008 Kelley served as Consulting Curator of Contemporary Art at the Asian Art Museum of San Francisco, organizing major exhibitions by contemporary Chinese artists including:

- Sui Jianguo, “The Sleep of Reason,” 2005
- Liu Xiaodong, “The Three Gorges Project,” 2006
- Zhan Wang, “On Gold Mountain: Sculpture from the Sierra,” 2008

In 2008, Kelley curated "Half-Life of a Dream: Chinese Contemporary Art from the Logan Collection" at the San Francisco Museum of Modern Art.

== Teaching ==
From 1993 to 2005 Kelley taught Art Theory and Criticism at the University of California, Berkeley. He founded and served as the director of the Center for Research in Contemporary Art (CRCA) at the University of Texas at Arlington. He has also held teaching positions at the University of Nevada at Las Vegas, California College of Arts and Crafts, and the San Francisco Art Institute.
