= Andrew Hintz =

New Zealand cricketer (1963–2016)

Personal information
- Full name: Andrew John Hintz
- Born: 8 December 1963; Christchurch, New Zealand
- Died: 7 February 2016 (aged 52); Christchurch, New Zealand
- Batting: Right-handed
- Bowling: Right-arm fast-medium
- Role: All-rounder

Domestic team information
- Years: Team
- 1985/86–1987/88: Canterbury
- FC debut: 6 February 1986 Canterbury v Otago
- Last FC: 29 January 1988 Canterbury v Wellington
- LA debut: 27 December 1986 Canterbury v Wellington
- Last LA: 1 January 1988 Canterbury v Northern Districts

Career statistics
Competition	First-class	List A
Matches	6	10
Runs scored	108	60
Batting average	13.50	15.00
100s/50s	0/1	0/0
Top score	62	32*
Balls bowled	674	535
Wickets	11	17
Bowling average	33.18	21.11
5 wickets in innings	0	0
10 wickets in match	0	0
Best bowling	3/51	4/23
Catches/stumpings	0/–	1/–
- Source: CricketArchive, 24 April 2016

Andrew John Hintz (8 December 1963 – 7 February 2016) was a New Zealand first-class cricketer who played for Canterbury.

Born in Christchurch on 8 December 1963, Hintz played club cricket for Burnside West University. A right-arm pace bowler, Hintz made six first-class appearances for Canterbury between 1985/86 and 1987/88, taking 11 wickets at an average of 33.18. With the bat he scored 108 runs, with a high score of 62, at an average of 13.50. In 10 one-day games for Canterbury, he took 17 wickets at 21.11, and scored 60 runs at an average of 15.00.

Hintz died of cancer at Christchurch on 7 February 2016.
