= Ross McPherson =

New Zealand sportsman

Ross James McPherson (24 October 1938 – 4 September 2016) was a field hockey goalkeeper from New Zealand. He represented New Zealand at two Olympic Games, 1968 and 1972. He also played first-class cricket for Northern Districts in the Plunket Shield.
