= Robert Morrison (footballer) =

New Zealand footballer

Bob Morrison
Personal information
- Full name: Robert F Morrison
- Date of birth: 30 December 1926
- Date of death: 28 February 2016 (aged 89)
- Place of death: Auckland, New Zealand

Senior career*
Years	Team	Apps	(Gls)
- Brigadiers

International career
1951–1952	New Zealand	10	(0)
- * Club domestic league appearances and goals

Robert Morrison (1926–2016) was an association football player who represented New Zealand at international level.

Morrison made his full All Whites debut, a 0–2 loss to New Caledonia on 19 September 1951 and ended his international playing career with 10 A-international caps to his credit, his final cap an appearance in a 5–3 win over Tahiti on 28 September 1952.
