= Karl Leo =

German physicist

Karl Leo (born 10 July 1960 in Freiburg im Breisgau, Baden-Württemberg, Germany) is a German physicist. He holds the chair of optoelectronics at the Dresden Integrated Center for Applied Physics and Photonic Materials (IAPP) of TU Dresden and is a leading researcher on organic semiconductors. He is known for the controlled electrical doping of organic thin films and the resulting highly efficient organic light-emitting diodes (OLEDs) and organic solar cells, and for the first experimental generation and detection of Bloch oscillations in a semiconductor superlattice. Leo has co-founded several technology spin-off companies based upon his research, among them Novaled and Heliatek. His honours include the Gottfried Wilhelm Leibniz Prize (2002), the Deutscher Zukunftspreis (2011), the Blaise Pascal Medal in Physics (2021) and the Order of Merit of the Free State of Saxony (2025).

== Education and Career ==
After his Abitur in 1979 in St. Georgen im Schwarzwald and military service in 1980, Leo studied physics at the Albert-Ludwigs-Universität Freiburg, graduating in 1985 with a diploma thesis on solar cells carried out at the Fraunhofer Institute for Solar Energy Systems under Adolf Goetzberger. In 1986 he moved to the Max Planck Institute for Solid State Research in Stuttgart, where he received his doctorate from the University of Stuttgart in 1988 under Hans-Joachim Queisser, with work on ultrafast spectroscopy of semiconductors.

From 1989 to 1991 Leo was an Otto Hahn fellow and postdoctoral researcher at AT&T Bell Laboratories in Holmdel, New Jersey. He then joined RWTH Aachen as an assistant professor and completed his habilitation in 1993. Since the 1993/94 winter term he has held a full professorship for optoelectronics at the Dresden Integrated Center for Applied Physics and Photonic Materials (IAPP) of TU Dresden, which he has headed (with an interruption from 2003 to 2006). In parallel he worked for the Fraunhofer Society from 2001 to 2013, first as a department head at the Fraunhofer Institute for Photonic Microsystems (IPMS) and, from 2008, as director of its organic-electronics division, which became Fraunhofer COMEDD in 2012. He has also held visiting professorships at Tohoku University (2009) and at King Abdullah University of Science and Technology (KAUST, 2013–2014).

== Research focus ==
Leo works in semiconductor optics and the physics of thin organic films. In 1992 he achieved the first generation and detection of Bloch oscillations in a semiconductor superlattice, an effect long considered impossible to observe. Much of his later work concerns the controlled electrical doping of organic semiconductors, which enabled p–i–n device architectures and organic light-emitting diodes with very low operating voltages and record power efficiencies; in 2009 his group reported a white OLED reaching the luminous efficiency of a fluorescent tube. His work on organic solar cells produced some of the highest reported efficiencies, later commercialised through the spin-off Heliatek. Further topics include organic permeable-base transistors, near-infrared organic photodetectors and organic bioelectronics. Leo has published more than 700 peer-reviewed papers and is co-inventor of around 60 patent families.

== Awards ==
- Otto Hahn Medal, Max Planck Society, 1989
- Rudolf von Bennigsen-Foerder Preis des Landes Nordrhein-Westfalen, 1992
- Gottfried Wilhelm Leibniz Prize, Deutsche Forschungsgemeinschaft, 2002
- Academy Prize, Berlin-Brandenburg Academy of Sciences and Humanities, 2002
- Elected member, Leopoldina (German National Academy of Sciences), 2003
- Manfred von Ardenne Prize, 2006
- Deutscher Zukunftspreis (German Future Prize), 2011
- Rudolf Jaeckel Prize, German Vacuum Society, 2012
- Honorary doctorate (Dr. techn. h.c.), University of Southern Denmark, 2013
- Elected member, European Academy of Sciences (EURASC), 2014
- Hector Science Award and Hector Fellow, 2014
- Fellow, Optical Society of America (OSA), 2015
- Fellow, Canadian Institute for Advanced Research (CIFAR), 2015
- Technology Transfer Prize, German Physical Society (DPG), 2016
- Wilhelm Ostwald Medal, Saxon Academy of Sciences, 2017
- Elected member, acatech (German Academy of Science and Engineering), 2018
- futureSAX Saxon Transfer Prize, 2019
- Jan Rajchman Prize, Society for Information Display (SID), 2021
- Blaise Pascal Medal in Physics, European Academy of Sciences, 2021
- European Inventor Award (Lifetime Achievement), European Patent Office, 2021
- UNIPRENEURS Founders Award, 2023
- Order of Merit of the Free State of Saxony, 2025
