= Center for Digital Technology and Management =

German research and teaching institute

Coordinates: 48°08′37″N 11°33′29″E

Center for Digital Technology & Management
- Motto: Empowering innovators of tomorrow
- Established: 1998
- Location: Munich, Germany
- Website: www.cdtm.de
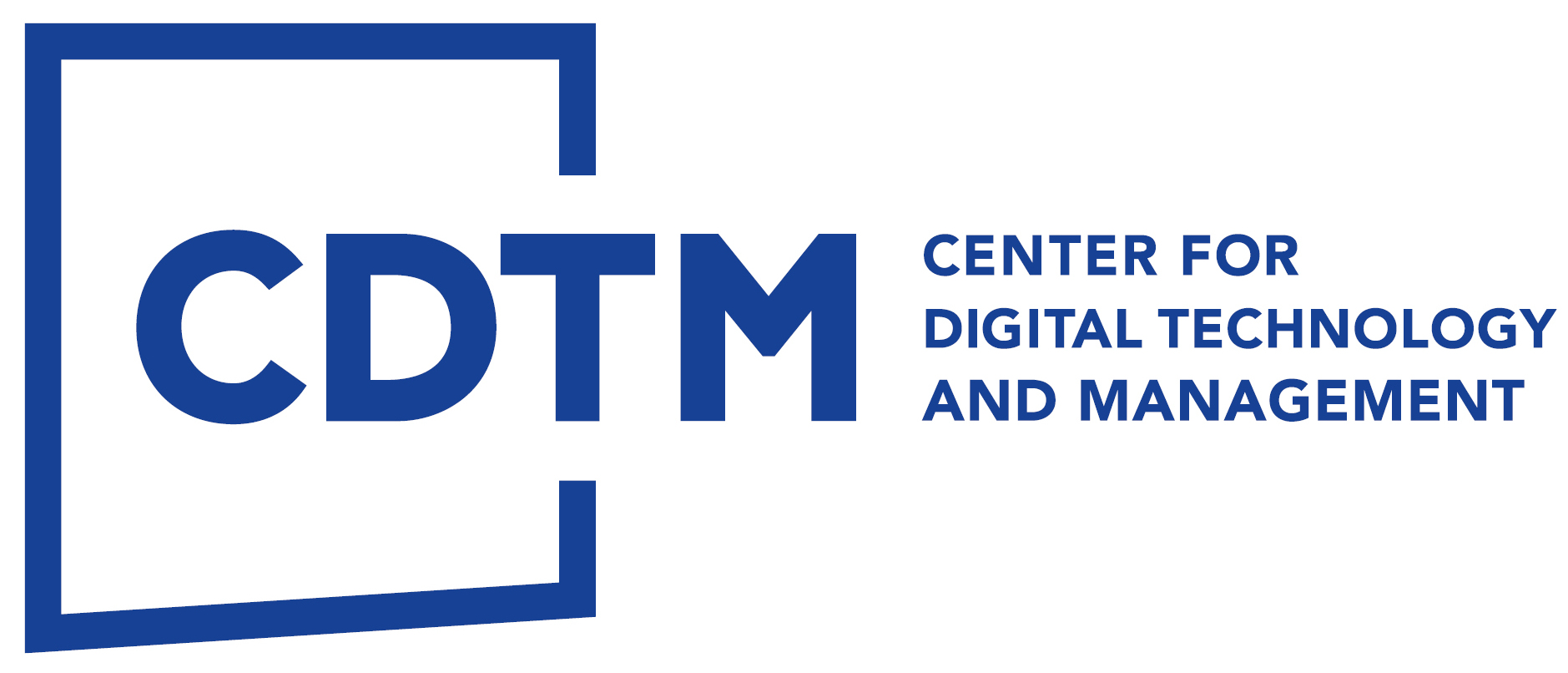

The Center for Digital Technology and Management (CDTM) is a joint research and educational institute established by the Technical University of Munich (TUM) and LMU Munich. It was founded by Manfred Broy, Jörg Eberspächer, Arnold Picot, and Andrew Kelly in 1998. The main goal of the CDTM is to provide innovative entrepreneurial education to students and advance research in diverse fields.

== Education ==
As a member of the Elite Network Bavaria, the additional study program "Technology Management" is located at the interface of digital technology, management, and entrepreneurship. Each semester, up to 25 highly qualified and ambitious students are recruited from a pool of more than 300 interdisciplinary applicants for this program. Most represented study fields are business administration, electrical engineering, and computer science. Through close cooperation with various renowned industrial partners, the focus of the English program is on providing practical experience for students.

The Technology Management program aims to educate the innovators of tomorrow. During the program students develop the necessary professional and interpersonal skills to work together in interdisciplinary teams and sustainably address our society's challenges today beyond digital technologies. The Elite Network Bavaria recognizes the study program as a four-semester elite study program at Master's level where students can gather up to 45 ECTS. Students graduate with an Honours Degree in Technology Management, which is jointly awarded by the sponsoring universities and confirmed with a certificate.

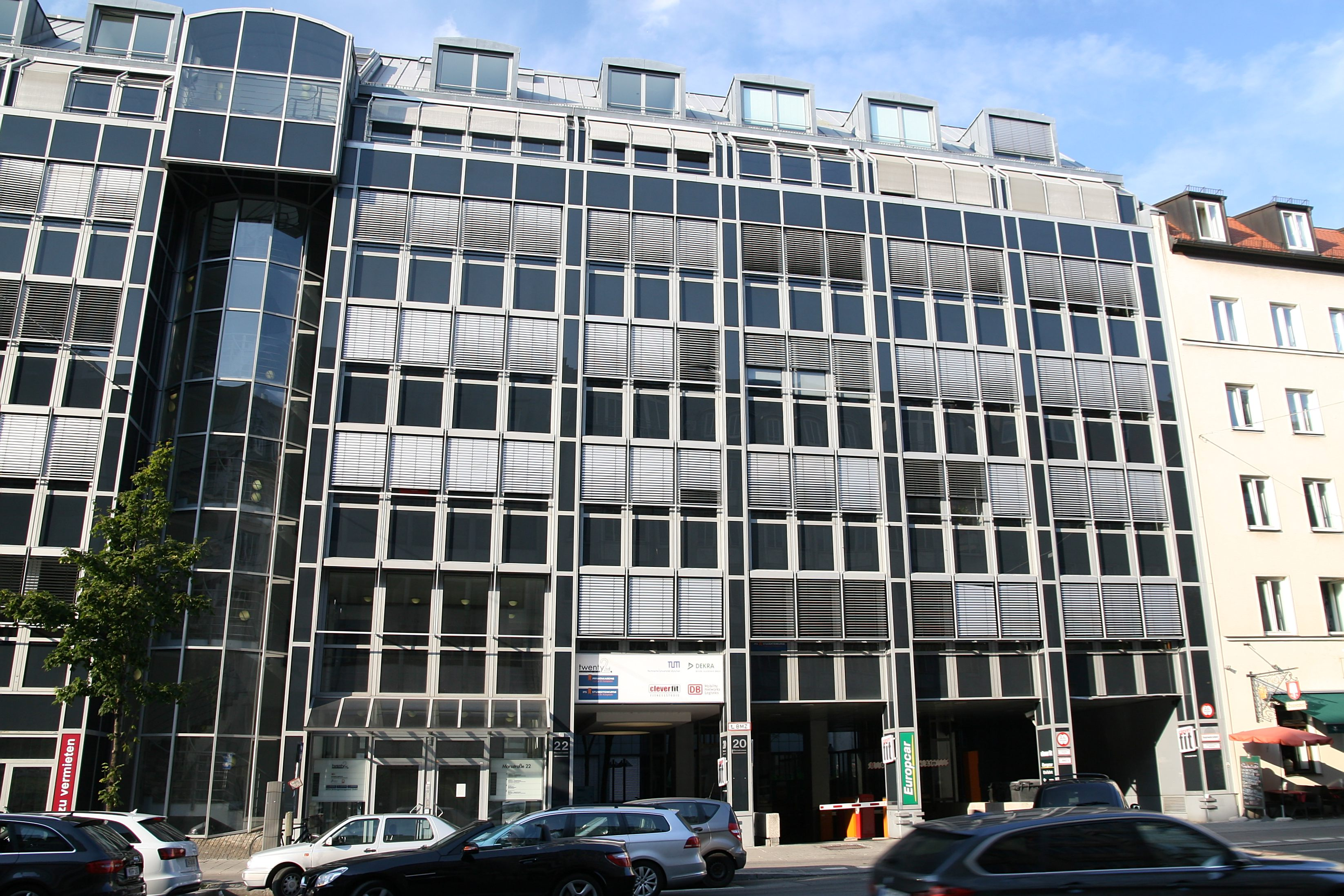
The institute is situated at Marsstraße 20–22 in Munich.

=== Content and procedure ===
The Technology Management program spreads throughout one to two years, with one block seminar during the lecture-free period and two regular semesters. Technology Management is offered as a supplemental program to a traditional Bachelor's or Master's degree and thus represents an additional qualification. The program aims to complement university education with a particular focus on practice. The presentational phases occur in Munich and primarily in the evening or on weekends to ensure compatibility with primary studies. The content focuses on trend research, product development, entrepreneurship, and soft skills. Due to frequently changing elective courses, the core program is always complemented by new electives, such as design thinking, hardware prototyping, social entrepreneurship or data science. A stay abroad is required for up to four months in the form of an internship with partner companies such as Infosys or a semester abroad. Partner universities include UC Berkeley, Columbia University, Massachusetts Institute of Technology, ETH Zurich and HEC Montréal.

=== Alumni ===
As of October 2021, the CDTM has expanded its alumni network to over 900 graduates. In total, over 230 companies have been founded by CDTM alumni since its establishment.

Notable alumni include:

- Armin Bauer, founder of Amiando und IDnow
- Julian Blessin, co-founder of Tier Mobility
- Florian Biller, Patrick Christ, Florian Ettlinger, Sebastian Schlecht, founders of Capmo
- Julia Bösch, co-founder of Outfittery
- Henry Brodski and Rodrigo Rivera Castro, founders of Emplido
- Joshua Cornelius and Mehmet Yilmaz, founders of Freeletics
- Fabian Dany, CEO of Finanztip
- Christian Deger, David Bellem, Simon Eumes and Johannes Lechner, founders of Payworks
- Andreas Franz, CEO of Framos GmbH
- Benjamin Günther, Sebastian Schuon, Max-Josef Meier and Anselm Bauer, founders of Stylight
- Sami Haddadin, professor at the Technical University of Munich
- Hung Hieu Dang and Hai Nguyen Mau, co-founders at Y42
- Jonas Huckestein, founder of Monzo Bank
- Katharina Jünger, founder of TeleClinic GmbH
- Jonathan Landgrebe, CEO of Suhrkamp Verlag
- Vlad Lata, co-founder of Konux
- Johannes Martens, founder of Aloqa
- Erik Muttersbach and Michael Wax, co-founders at Forto GmbH
- Thomas Pischke, co-founder of Trade Republic
- Hanno Renner, Ignaz Forstmeier, Roman Schumacher and Arseniy Vershinin, co-founders at Personio
- Veronika Riederle, co-founder of Demodesk
- Maximilian Rothkopf, COO of Hapag-Lloyd AG
- Philipp Rösch-Schlanderer and Florian Sauter, founder of eGym
- Georg Schroth, co-founder of NavVis GmbH
- Nikolaus von Taysen, founder of PAY.ON AG
- Oliver Trinchera, founder of Kinexon
- Isabell Welpe, professor at the Technical University of Munich
- Maximilian Schütz, Carl Pfeiffer and Bernhard Mehl, co-founders at Kisi
- Sebastian Schaal, co-founder of Luminovo
- Elias Atahi, co-founder of Unu
- Stefan Rothlehner, Sergei Krauze, Manuel Thurner and Konstantin Mehl, co-founders at Foodora
- Manuel Thurner and Konstantin Mehl, co-founders at Kaia Health
- Veronika Schweigert, Sascha Ritz and Dragan Mileski, co-founders at Climedo Health
- Dr. Gesa Biermann, Florian Fincke, and Jonas Kerber, co-founders at Pina Earth

== Research ==
Excellent research at the interface of digital technologies and entrepreneurship is another task of the CDTM. The conducted research focuses on new technologies that will become relevant in five to ten years. In detail, topics such as prototyping, business model innovation, and technology transfer are addressed. A particularity at the CDTM is the close link between research and teaching. An interdisciplinary structure enables the incorporation of expertise from students, doctoral students, and professors. For instance, current topics are integrated into courses, and students are involved in research projects through seminars and theses. Publicly funded research projects of the European Union are, for example, innovative educational initiatives in the food industry or the health sector. But also private research projects are carried out at the CDTM. In numerous projects, the CDTM cooperates with institutes such as the Karolinska Institute, the European Institute of Innovation & Technology (EIT) or educational institutions such as the IESE Business School, Imperial College London, Queen's University Belfast, or the University of Cambridge.

Each semester, the CDTM publishes a trend study about future scenarios and ideas for digital business models. Previous topics were "Public admission in the digital era" in spring 2020 and "Parentech - the future of parenting" in autumn 2019.

== Organisation ==
The CDTM is mainly organized by the so-called Center Assistants of the management team. They develop and improve the additional study program besides fostering new research opportunities. In addition to the center assistants, the students, also called "Centerlings", shape the CDTM. A board of professors makes crucial strategic and organizational decisions.

This board is composed of the following professors (as of October 2021):

- Andreas Butz
- Klaus Diepold
- Dietmar Harhoff
- Thomas Hess
- Dieter Kranzlmüller
- Wolfgang Kellerer
- Tobias Kretschmer
- Alexander Pretschner
- Martin Spann
- Isabell Welpe
- Hana Milanov
- Jelena Spanjol
- Jörg Claussen
- Reiner Braun
- Albrecht Schmidt
- Helmut Krcmar (retired)
- Bernd Brügge (retired)
- Manfred Broy (retired)
- Jörg Eberspächer (retired)
- Heinz-Gerd Hegering (retired)
