= Manfred Curbach =

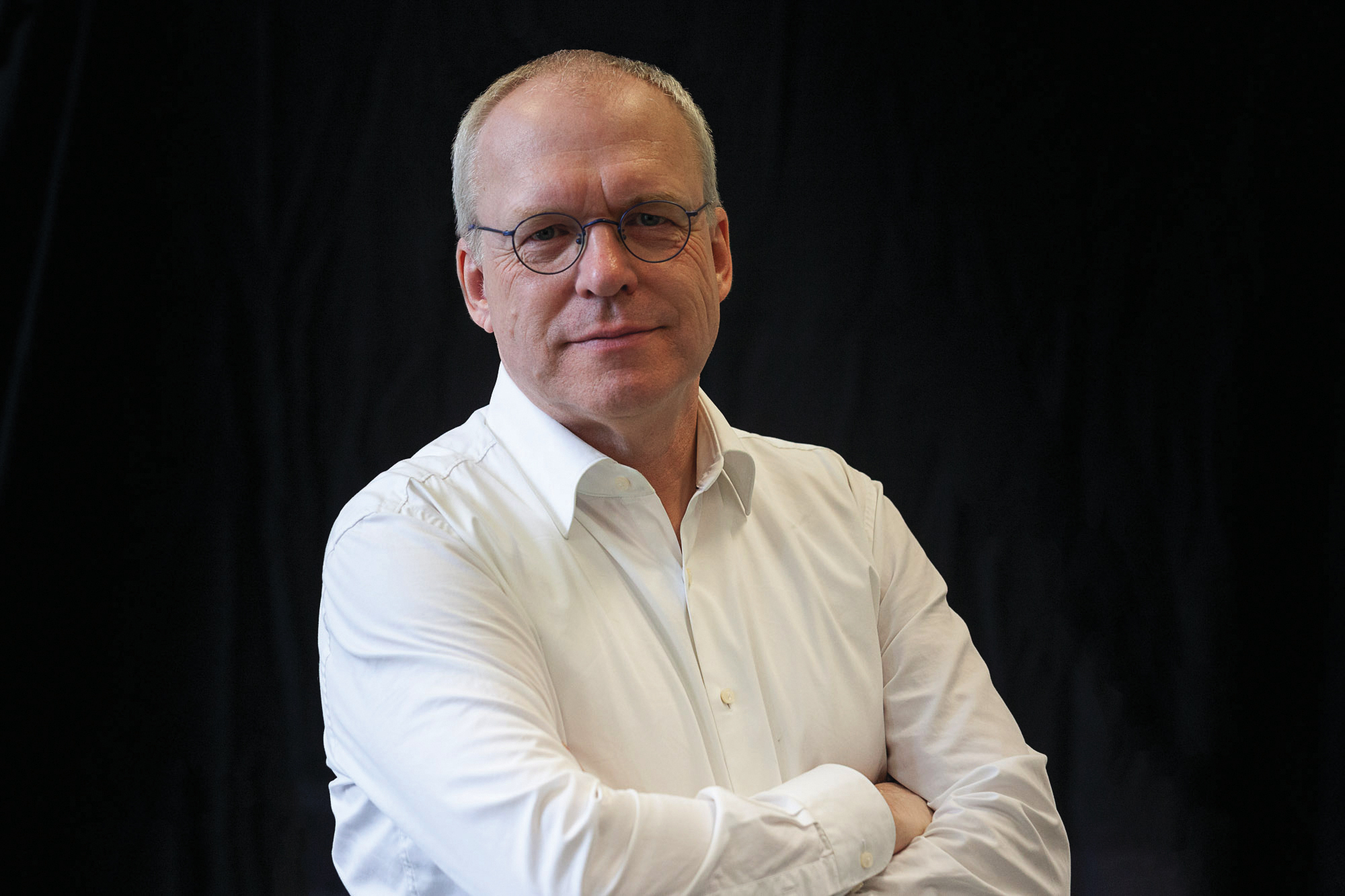
Manfred Curbach, university professor of Concrete Structures at the Faculty of Civil Engineering, Technische Universität Dresden

Manfred Curbach (born 28 September 1956 in Dortmund) is a German civil engineer and university professor. He is a leading researcher in the development of textile-reinforced concrete and carbon reinforced concrete respectively.

== Life and career ==
Manfred Curbach completed his A Levels in June 1976 at the Albert-Einstein-Gymnasium in Dortmund. From 1977 to 1982 he studied Civil Engineering at the Technische Universität Dortmund, specialising in structural engineering. In 1980 he was admitted to the Studienstiftung des Deutschen Volkes (German Academic Scholarship Foundation of the Federal Republic of Germany). After his graduation, he took up the scholarship to work for David P. Billington at the University of Princeton (USA) doing research on "Bridge construction in the USA" and "Robert Maillart".

From 1982 to 1988, Manfred Curbach was Josef Eibl's research assistant, first at the University of Dortmund and later at the University of Karlsruhe, where he also received his doctorate in 1987. In 1988 he started working as project manager at the Ingenieurbüro Köhler + Seitz where he was also a partner from 1994 to 2004.

Since August 1994 Manfred Curbach holds the professorship for the Institut für Massivbau (Institute of Concrete Structures) at the Technische Universität Dresden, which is still his main field of activity today. Since 1997 he is registered as test engineer for structural analysis, specialising in concrete structures. In 2005 he started a new engineering company Curbach Bösche Ingenieurpartner, Dresden. In December 2014 the company CarboCon GmbH was founded which specialises in design, construction, calculation and building with carbon reinforced concrete. Curbach is one of the three founding partners.

== Research ==
=== Textile and carbon reinforced concrete ===
Manfred Curbach concentrates on basic research and application-oriented research for the development of textile and carbon reinforced concrete with the aim to establish it in the building industry. From 1999 to 2011 Curbach was the spokesman for the Collaborative Research Centre 528 "Textile reinforcements for structural reinforcement and repair". As part of this research programme, the new composite material, made of high-strength fine concrete and high-performance fibres (made of different materials such as alkali-resistant glass, later mainly carbon fibres), was developed and researched, as well as transferred into practice by pilot projects in cooperation with construction companies.

Since July 2020 Manfred Curbach is spokesman of the Collaborative Research Center/Transregio (SFB/TRR) 280 "Design strategies for material-minimized carbon reinforced concrete structures – Foundations for a new way of building", funded by the German Research Foundation DFG. Involved are the Technische Universität Dresden, RWTH Aachen and IPF Dresden. While previous research projects investigated the fundamentals and the applicability of the new material carbon reinforced concrete, this SFB/TRR investigates new construction strategies for carbon reinforced concrete in a total of 17 subprojects. The aim is that the new material composite carbon reinforced concrete will not only replace the previously used reinforced concrete, but that new ways of construction will be found that are specifically tailored to the properties of carbon concrete in order to really exploit the full performance potential of this novel building material.

Curbach is the head of a consortium of one of ten Zwanzig20-projects, funded by the German Ministry of Education and Research with up to 45 million euro. The consortium C^{3} – Carbon Concrete Composite pursues the goal to introduce a completely new design with carbon reinforced concrete (CarbonBeton).

Further fields of research are the material behaviour of concrete under multiaxial load or at high loading rates.

=== Impact ===
Manfred Curbach also works on the subject of high-speed dynamics/ impact for concrete and concrete structures and has established a centre of competence regarding it.

=== Multiaxial ===
Curbach produced significant results on the multiaxial loading of concrete, especially ultra-high-strength concrete, and built up a research group for this experimentally and theoretically very challenging topic.

=== Bridges ===
With the organisation of the annual Dresdner Brückenbausymposium Curbach succeeded in establishing a national and international centre and meeting place for bridge construction engineers. This symposium as well as the design, calculation and construction of large bridges, has had a lasting influence on bridge construction.

=== History of concrete construction ===
Due to the research of the national and international history of concrete construction the civil engineering community worldwide experiences an increasing awareness for their own history.

== Memberships ==
Since 1999 Manfred Curbach has been a member of the scientific advisory board of the magazine Beton- und Stahlbetonbau. Since 2010 he is head of the German delegation of the International Concrete Association fib and since February 2012 he is on the review board of the Deutsche Forschungsgemeinschaft (DFG) (German Research Foundation). He is a member of the executive board and the research advisory board of the Deutscher Ausschuss für Stahlbeton (DAfStb) (German Committee for Reinforced Concrete), where he was chairman of the executive board from 2004 to 2012. From 2002 to 2008 he was a member of the senate of the DFG and from 2003 to 2008 chairman of the executive board of the VDI-Gesellschaft, Bautechnik (Association of German Engineers – Division Construction Engineering). Curbach has been a member of the scientific advisory board of the Bundesanstalt für Wasserbau (BAW) (Federal Waterways Engineering and Research Institute) since 2011 and has been its chairman since 2015.

Curbach is a member of the editorial board of the magazine Civil Engineering Design.

Curbach is also head of the task group for textile reinforced concrete and the task group for the history of concrete construction for the fib (fédération internationale du béton).

== Awards ==
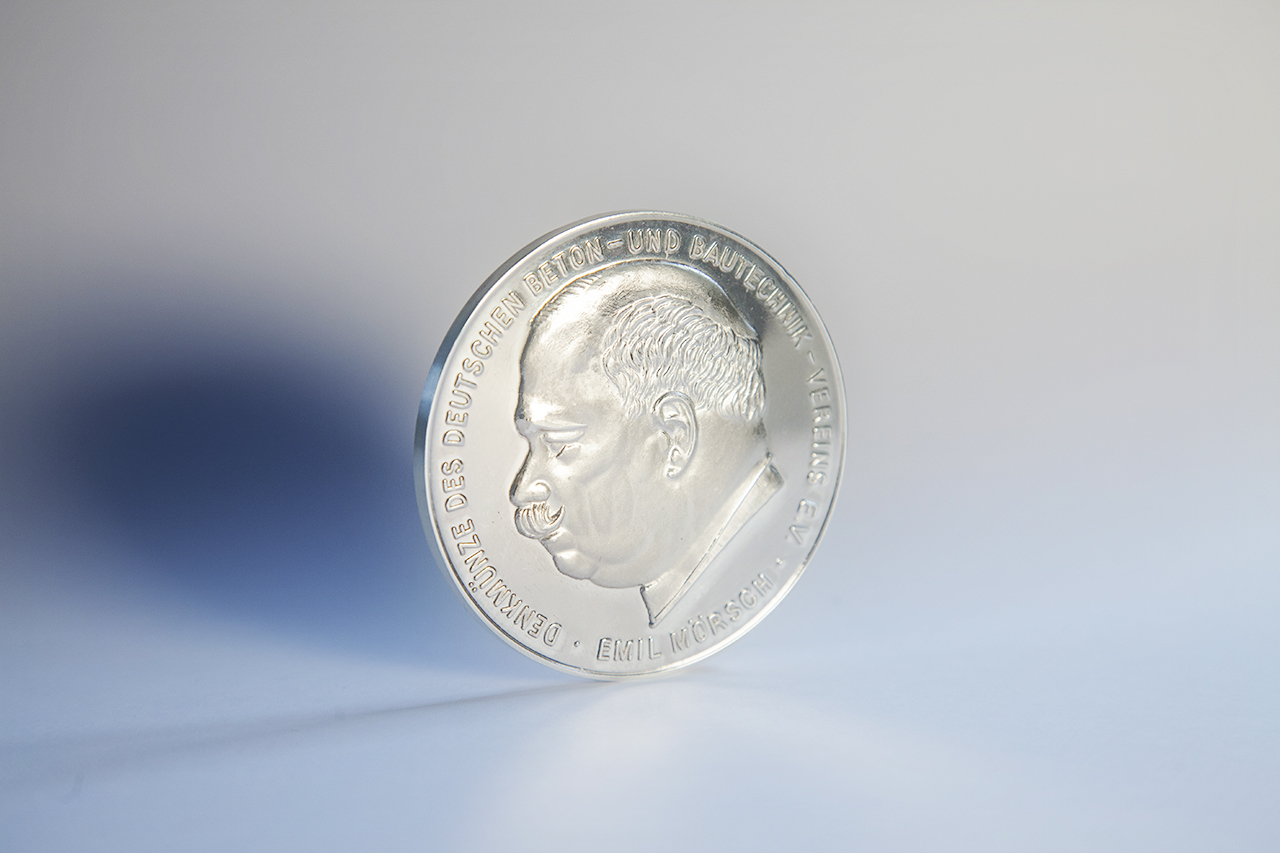
Emil Mörsch commemorative coin

On 15 November 2011, Curbach received an honorary doctorate from the Universität Kaiserslautern for his outstanding scientific achievements in structural engineering, his services in the consistent implementation of research results into practice and his exemplary personality.

Since June 2013, Curbach has been a member of the Nationale Akademie der Wissenschaften Leopoldina (National Academy of Sciences Leopoldina). In 2017, the honour was bestowed on him to hold the renowned Christmas lecture of the Leopoldina. In September 2014, the VDI-Gesellschaft – Bauen und Gebäudetechnik (VDI-Association – Division Civil Engineering and Building) awarded Manfred Curbach at its annual convention the Wolfgang-Zerna-Medal of Honour for "outstanding achievements in the field of construction technology".

In February 2016 Curbach was awarded the George Sarton Medal of the History of Science Society, University of Ghent.

In 2016 Curbach was elected to the Sächsische Akademie der Wissenschaften (Saxon Academy of Sciences).

In 2016 he received the Deutscher Zukunftspreis together with Chokri Cherif and Peter Offermann, which is awarded by the German Federal President.

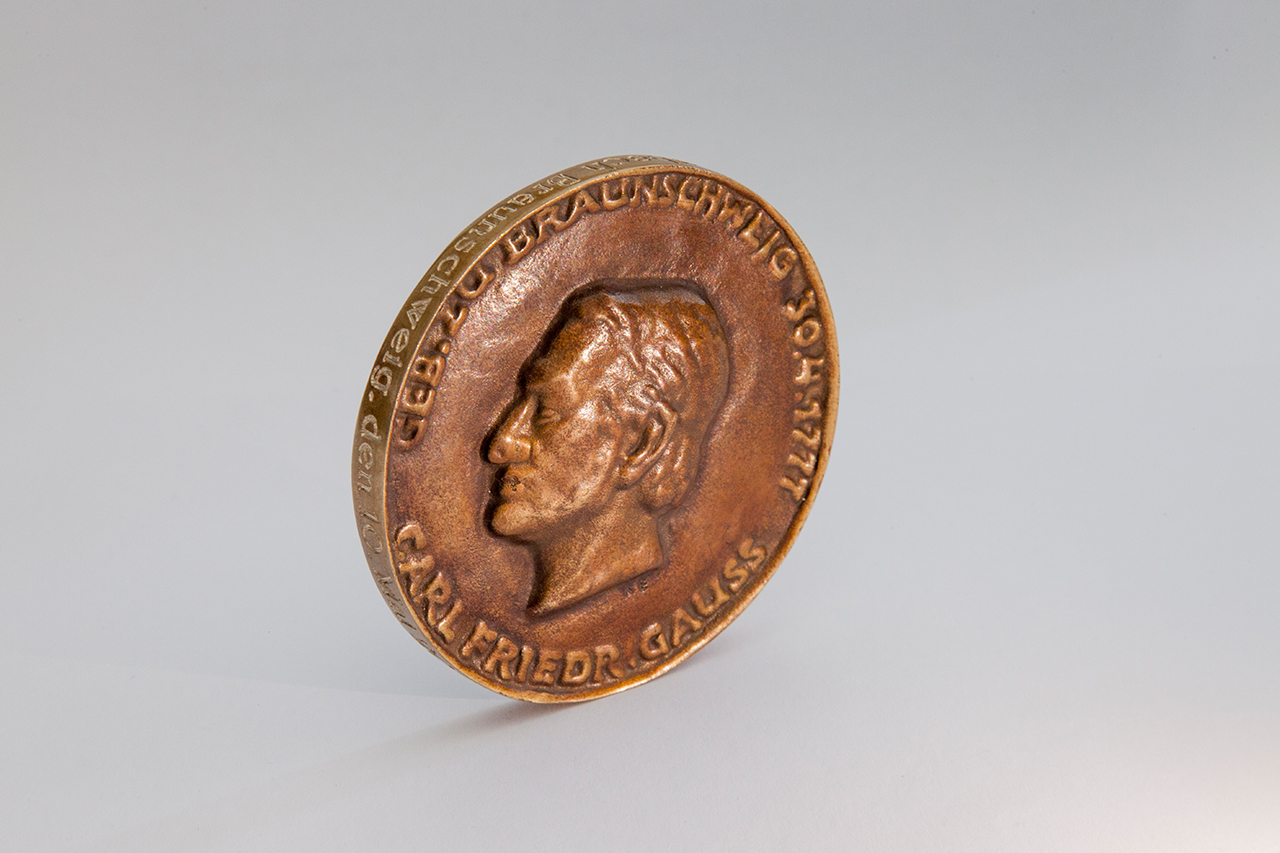
Carl Friedrich Gauss Medal

At the Saxon Chamber of Engineers Day he was awarded the Wackerbarth Medal for his recognized scientific work and his commitment to the internationally recognized Dresden Bridge Building Symposium in November 2018.

At the German Construction Technology Day 2019 in Stuttgart, Manfred Curbach received the Emil Mörsch commemorative coin, donated by the German Society for Concrete and Construction Technology (Deutscher Beton- und Bautechnik-Verein E.V.).

On 10 May 2019 he was awarded the Carl Friedrich Gauss Medal, donated by the Braunschweig Scientific Society (BWG).

Since December 2019, Manfred Curbach has been a corresponding member of the engineering sciences class of the Braunschweig Scientific Society.

Also in December 2019 he became a full member of acatech – German Academy of Science and Engineering.

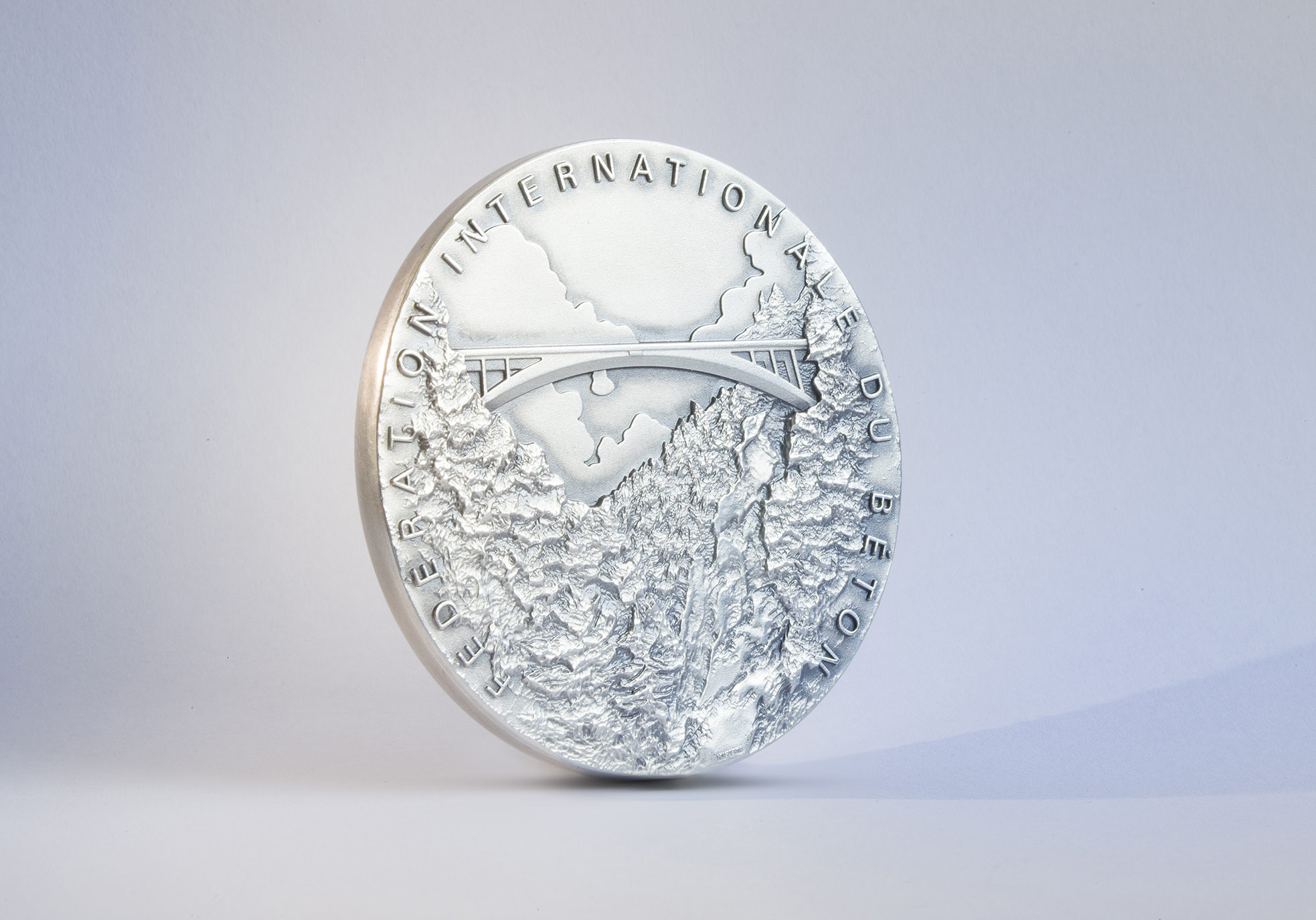
Photo shows a photograph of the "fib Medal of Merit" of the Fédération internationale du béton

On 4 October 2021, Technische Universität Dresden honoured members who have rendered outstanding services and special individual achievements for the good of the university. Curbach received a Golden Badge of Honour for, among other things, his pioneering work in the field of textile and carbon concrete and for a successful term of office in the TUD's Prorectorate of University Development.

In February 2022, Curbach was elected fib Fellow 2022 as one of 10 fib members who have belonged to fib – Fédération internationale du béton for at least 10 years, who represent its values and who have actively rendered outstanding services to concrete construction – in teaching, research, design and construction.

In May 2023, Curbach was awarded the fib Medal of Merit by fib - Fédération internationale du béton in recognition of his outstanding contributions.

In April 2024, Curbach, together with a team from the Institute of Concrete Structures at TU Dresden and in cooperation with the Institute of Textile Machinery and High Performance Material Technology (ITM) at TU Dresden, received the Techtextil Innovation Award 2024 in the category "New Concept".

In October 2025, it was announced that Manfred Curbach would receive the Sustainability Academic Award from the Nobel Sustainability Trust in the category "Leadership in the Implementation of Sustainability". The award recognizes his pioneering work in the field of carbon-reinforced concrete.

== Works ==
- Donau bridge Fischerdorf (1988)
- Spessart bridge, road bridge over the Main near Wertheim (1989–1990)
- Main bridge Retzbach-Zellingen (1990–1991)
- Neckar bridges during the construction of the federal highway B 312 between B10 and B 14/29 in Stuttgart (1992–1993)
- Main bridge Oberndorf during the construction of motorway A 70 (1993)
- Saale bridge Rudolphstein
- Textile reinforced concrete bridges in Oschatz (2005) and Kempten (2007)

== Publications ==
=== Selected publications ===
- May, Sebastian; Michler, Harald; Schladitz, Frank; Curbach, Manfred (10 April 2018). "Lightweight ceiling system made of carbon reinforced concrete". Structural Concrete. 19 (6). Wiley: 1862–1872. doi:10.1002/suco.201700224. ISSN 1464-4177. S2CID 115669924.
- Frenzel, Michael; Curbach, Manfred (26 October 2017). "Shear strength of concrete interfaces with infra-lightweight and foam concrete". Structural Concrete. 19 (1). Wiley: 269–283. doi:10.1002/suco.201700015. ISSN 1464-4177.
- Hegger, Josef; Curbach, Manfred; Stark, Alexander; Wilhelm, Sebastian; Farwig, Kristina (23 November 2017). "Innovative design concepts: Application of textile reinforced concrete to shell structures". Structural Concrete. 19 (3). Wiley: 637–646. doi:10.1002/suco.201700157. ISSN 1464-4177. S2CID 116055864.
- Quast, Matthias; Curbach, Manfred (2017). "Concrete under biaxial dynamic compressive loading". Procedia Engineering. 210. Elsevier BV: 24–31. doi:10.1016/j.proeng.2017.11.044. ISSN 1877-7058.
- Schmidt, Angela; Curbach, Manfred (23 March 2017). "Design optimization to increase the (buckling) stability of concrete columns". Structural Concrete. 18 (5). Wiley: 680–692. doi:10.1002/suco.201600183. ISSN 1464-4177. S2CID 113784362.
- Wilhelm, Sebastian; Curbach, Manfred (2017). "Experimental and nonlinear numerical analysis of underwater housings for the deep sea, made of ultra-high performance concrete". Structural Concrete. 18 (1). Wiley: 216–224. doi:10.1002/suco.201600018. ISSN 1464-4177. S2CID 113503866.
- Zobel, Robert; Curbach, Manfred (23 February 2017). "Numerical study of reinforced and prestressed concrete components under biaxial tensile stresses". Structural Concrete. 18 (2). Wiley: 356–365. doi:10.1002/suco.201600077. ISSN 1464-4177. S2CID 114467847.
- Ritter, Robert; Curbach, Manfred (2016). "Shape of Hypersurface of Concrete under Multiaxial Loading". ACI Materials Journal. 113 (1). American Concrete Institute. doi:10.14359/51688182. ISSN 0889-325X.
- Beckmann, Birgit; Schicktanz, Kai; Reischl, Dirk; Curbach, Manfred (2012). "DEM simulation of concrete fracture and crack evolution". Structural Concrete. 13 (4). Wiley: 213–220. doi:10.1002/suco.201100036. ISSN 1464-4177. S2CID 110545782.

=== Publications for the DAfStb ("green booklets") ===
- Manfred Curbach, Silke Scheerer, Kerstin Speck, Torsten Hampel: Experimentelle Analyse des Tragverhaltens von Hochleistungsbeton unter mehraxialer Beanspruchung. Heft 578, 2011.
- Manfred Curbach, Kerstin Speck: Konzentrierte Lasteinleitung in dünnwandige Bauteile aus textilbewehrtem Beton. Heft 571, 2008.
- Manfred Curbach, Kerstin Speck: Mehraxiale Festigkeit von duktilem Hochleistungsbeton. Heft 524, 2002.
- Manfred Curbach u. a.: Sachstandsbericht zum Einsatz von Textilien im Massivbau. Heft 488, 1998.
- Manfred Curbach, Thomas Bösche: Verwendung von Bitumen als Gleitschicht im Massivbau. Heft 485.

=== Further publications ===
A detailed list of publications is available on the website of the Institut für Massivbau.
