= Sami Haddadin =

Electrical engineer, computer scientist

- Born: June 26, 1980 (age 46); Neustadt am Rübenberge, Germany
- Citizenship: German
- Awards: Gottfried Wilhelm Leibniz Prize (2019); German Future Prize (2017)

Sami Haddadin (born 26 June 1980) is a German electrical engineer, computer scientist, and university professor specializing in robotics and artificial intelligence. From April 2018 until January 2025, he served as the founding and executive director of the Munich Institute of Robotics and Machine Intelligence (TUM MIRMI) at the Technical University of Munich (TUM), where he also held the Chair of Robotics and Systems Intelligence. Sami Haddadin is vice president for Research at the Mohamed bin Zayed University of Artificial Intelligence.

== Early life and education ==
Haddadin was born in Neustadt am Rübenberge, Germany, to a Jordanian doctor and a Finnish nurse. He is the eldest of three children. He completed his Abitur in 1999 in Stolzenau and pursued studies in electrical engineering and informatics at several institutions, including the Leibniz University Hannover, the University of Hagen, the University of Oulu in Finland, and Munich. Haddadin holds degrees in electrical engineering, computer science, and technology management from the Technical University of Munich and the Center for Digital Technology and Management (CDTM), a joint institute of TUM and LMU Munich.

== Career ==
Haddadin received his doctorate summa cum laude from RWTH Aachen University in 2011. He subsequently worked as a research assistant at the German Aerospace Center (DLR). From April 2014 to April 2018, he held the Chair of Automatic Control at the Leibniz University Hannover. From 2018 until January 2025, he joined TUM as a professor and director of TUM MIRMI. Haddadin has published over 200 scientific articles and is recognized for his contributions to robotics and AI.

Haddadin is a co-founder of the German robotics company Franka Emika GmbH. His invention, the Panda Robotic Arm, was included in Time magazine's "50 Best Inventions of 2018" and featured in National Geographic in September 2020. His patent for the "Tactile Robot" is part of the "Milestone made in Germany" collection by the German Patent and Trade Mark Office (DPMA).

Haddadin and his team curated the exhibition "KI.ROBOTIK.DESIGN," which explores the development and future of robotics and AI. The exhibition was presented at the Pinakothek der Moderne in Munich.

Haddadin has been involved in various initiatives and commissions, such as the "Robot Factory" training program in Hanover and the Study Commission on Artificial Intelligence in the German Parliament. He has served on the EU High-Level Industrial Roundtable "Industry 2030" and the EU High-Level Expert Group on Artificial Intelligence. In 2020, he was appointed Chairman of the Bavarian AI Council.

== Awards and honors ==
Haddadin has received several prestigious awards, including the Gottfried Wilhelm Leibniz Prize in 2019 and the Alfried Krupp Sponsorship Award for Young University Teachers in 2015. In 2017, he and his colleagues Simon Haddadin and Sven Parusel were awarded the German Future Prize for their work on affordable, flexible, and user-friendly robots. In 2021, Haddadin was elected a member of the German National Academy of Sciences Leopoldina.

== Startups ==
Haddadin has founded several companies, including:

- Franka Emika GmbH (2016)
- KBee AG (2014–2016)
- Kastanienbaum GmbH (2012–2014)

== Publications ==
- Kühn, J., Bagnato, C., Burdet, E., Haddadin S. Arm movement adaptation to concurrent pain constraints. Scientific Reports 11, 6792 (2021).
- M. Tröbinger et al. and S. Haddadin, "Introducing GARMI - A Service Robotics Platform to Support the Elderly at Home: Design Philosophy, System Overview and First Results," in IEEE Robotics and Automation Letters, vol. 6, no. 3, pp. 5857–5864, July 2021.
- McLennan, S., Fiske, A., Celi, L., Müller, R., Harder, J., Ritt, K., Haddadin, S., Buyx, A. (2020): An embedded ethics approach for AI development. Nature Machine Intelligence 2 (7), 488–490.
- Haddadin, S., Johannsmeier, L., & Ledezma, F. D. (2018): Tactile robots as a central embodiment of the Tactile Internet. Proceedings of the IEEE, 107(2), 471–487.
- Haddadin, S., Krieger, K., Albu-Schäffer, A., & Lilge, T. (2018): Exploiting elastic energy storage for "blind" cyclic manipulation: Modeling, stability analysis, control, and experiments for dribbling. IEEE Transactions on Robotics, 34(1), 91–112.
- Tomic T, Ott C, Haddadin S: "External Wrench Estimation, Collision Detection, and Reflex Reaction for Flying Robots". IEEE Transactions on Robotics. 2017; 33(6): 1467–1482.
- Haddadin S., De Luca A., Albu-Schäffer A. (2017): "Robot Collisions: A Survey on Detection, Isolation, and Identification". IEEE Transactions on Robotics. 33(6): 1292–1312.
- Haddadin S., Croft E. (2016) Physical Human–Robot Interaction. In: Siciliano B., Khatib O. (eds) Springer Handbook of Robotics. Springer Handbooks. Springer, Cham.
- Haddadin S. (2014): "Towards Safe Robots". Springer Tracts in Advanced Robotics 90, Springer Berlin Heidelberg.
- Haddadin S, Haddadin S, Khoury A, Rokahr T, Parusel S, Burgkart R, Bicchi A, Albu-Schäffer. A (2012): "On making robots understand safety: Embedding injury knowledge into control". The International Journal of Robotics Research. 31(13): 1578–1602.
- Hochberg LR, Bacher D, Jarosiewicz B, Masse NY, Simeral JD, Vogel J, Haddadin S, Liu J, Cash SS, van der Smagt P, et al. (2012): "Reach and grasp by people with tetraplegia using a neurally controlled robotic arm". Nature 485: 372–375.
- Yang, C., Ganesh, G., Haddadin, S., Parusel, S., Albu-Schaeffer, A., & Burdet, E. (2011). Human-like adaptation of force and impedance in stable and unstable interactions. IEEE transactions on robotics, 27(5), 918–930.
- Haddadin, S, Albu-Schäffer A, Hirzinger G (2009): "G. Requirements for safe robots: Measurements, analysis and new insights". The International Journal of Robotics Research. 28(11–12): 1507–1527.
