= Maria-Regina Kula =

German biochemist

Maria-Regina Kula (born 16 March 1937) is an inventor. She was one of the two prize winners of the German Future Prize in 2002. Also in 2002, she was elected a member of the National Academy of Engineering for contributions to the understanding and practice of enzyme-based chemical processes and protein separations.

Awarded by the President of Germany, and worth €250,000, the prize helps to identify projects which are of high scientific value and, more importantly, have concrete applications and are already developed to a point of readiness for commercial applications. Kula was awarded the prize as a leading developer of inexpensive biocatalysts through the use of genetically opimised enzymes. Together with her co-researcher, Martina Pohl, she successfully isolated formate dehydrogenase (FDH) from the yeast "Candida boidinii", enabling manufacturers to develop and produce new drugs and other chemical products on a large scale in a way which is both environmentally sound and cost-effective.

== Biography ==
Maria-Regina Kula was born in Berlin. Between 1956 and 1960, she studied Chemistry at the Humboldt University of Berlin and the Ludwig-Maximilians-Universität München. It was from the Ludwig-Maximilians-Universität München that in 1962 she received her doctorate of natural sciences. She was employed as a research associate at the Ludwig-Maximilians-Universität München's Institute of Anorganic Chemistry ("Institut für Molekulare Enzymtechnologie" / IMET) between 1962 and 1964.

The first prototype of Kula's "Enzyme Membrane Reactor" (EMR) is on display (2016) at the Deutsches Museum in Munich, identified as one of the "100 most important technical inventions". The notice states that the reactor produces 75% of the world supply of L-Methionine. (Sources infer that this is not a reference to the 10ml prototype unit on display in the museum.) The EMR had its world launch at Konstanz in 1981. In 2005 Degussa, a specialist chemicals conglomerate headquartered in Essen, opened an EMR plant in China with an annual production capacity of 500 units.

She was based in Baltimore between 1964 and 1967, sponsored by the DFG at the Johns Hopkins University School of Medicine for a two-year training fellowship, followed by time as a "postdoc". During 1968 and 1969, she worked as a research associate at the Max Planck Institute for Experimental Medicine in Göttingen. She then worked till 1985 as head of department with the Society for Research in Molecular Biology ("Gesellschaft für Molekularbiologische Forschung" - today renamed as the "Heimholz Centre for Infection Research / "Helmholtz-Zentrum für Infektionsforschung"" / HZI) in Braunschweig. She also served as this institution's Scientific Director between 1975 and 1979. It was in 1979 that she received her Habilitation (high academic qualification) from the Bio-chemistry Faculty at the Technical University of Braunschweig, opening the way to a broadened range of career progression options in the mainstream universities sector.

In 1986, she moved west, taking a position as a professor and director of the Institute of Enzyme Technology at the University of Düsseldorf. Her role combined research and teaching. She retired from her university post in 2002.

== Awards and honours (selection) ==
- 1995 - Sherman Fairchild Distinguished Scholar of California Institute of Technology
- 1995 - Enzyme Engineering Award
- 1997 - Order of Merit of the Federal Republic of Germany 1st class
- 2002 - Elected Foreign Associate of the US National Academy of Engineering
- 2002 - German Future Prize
