= German Future Prize =

German science and innovation award

The German Future Prize award is considered one of the most prestigious conferred for science and innovation within Germany. The award is worth €250,000 and is supported by numerous sponsors.

This prize has been awarded to various exceptional individuals since 1997.

== The award winners and their projects ==
Year	Research team	Project name
1997	Christhard Deter, LDT GmbH & Co. Laser-Display-Technologie KG, Gera	"Einprägsames Bilderleben mit Laser-Großbildprojektion, der flachste Bildschirm variabel in Größe, Norm und Farbe"
1998	Peter Grünberg, Forschungszentrum Jülich	"Entdeckung des GMR-Effektes"
1999	Peter Gruss (speaker), Herbert Jäckle, Max Planck Institute for Biophysical Chemistry, Göttingen	"Molekularbiologische Verfahren für innovative Therapien"
2000	Karlheinz Brandenburg (speaker), Bernhard Grill, Harald Popp, Fraunhofer-Institut für Integrierte Schaltungen IIS, Erlangen	"MP3-Komprimierung von Audiosignalen in Hifi-Qualität für Internet und Rundfunk"
2001	Wolfgang Wahlster, Deutsches Forschungszentrum für Künstliche Intelligenz, Saarbrücken	"Sprachverstehende Computer als Dialog- und Übersetzungsassistenten"
2002	Maria-Regina Kula (speaker), Martina Pohl, Institut für Enzymtechnologie der Heinrich-Heine-Universität Düsseldorf im Forschungszentrum Jülich	"Sanfte Chemie mit biologischen Katalysatoren"
2003	Kazuaki Tarumi (speaker), Melanie Klasen-Memmer, Matthias Bremer, Merck KGaA, Darmstadt	"Leichter, heller, schneller: Flüssigkristalle für Fernsehbildschirme"
2004	Rainer Hintsche (speaker), Walter Gumbrecht, Roland Thewes, Fraunhofer-Institut für Siliziumtechnologie (ISIT), Itzehoe Siemens AG, Power & Sensor Systems, Corporate Technology, Erlangen Infineon, München	"Labor auf dem Chip – Elektrische Biochiptechnologie"
2005	Friedrich Boecking (spokesperson), Klaus Egger, Hans Meixner, Robert Bosch GmbH, Stuttgart, Siemens VDO Automotive AG, Regensburg	"Piezo-Injektoren: neue Technik für saubere und sparsame Diesel- und Benzinmotoren"
2006	Stefan Hell, Max Planck Institute for Biophysical Chemistry, Göttingen	"Lichtmikroskopie in ungekannter Schärfe"
2007	Klaus Streubel (spokesperson), Stefan Illek, Osram Opto Semiconductors GmbH, Regensburg, Andreas Bräuer, Fraunhofer-Institut für Angewandte Optik und Feinmechanik (IOF), Jena	"Licht aus Kristallen – Leuchtdioden erobern unseren Alltag"
2008	Jiri Marek (speaker), Michael Offenberg und Frank Melzer, Robert Bosch GmbH, Reutlingen, Bosch Sensortec GmbH, Reutlingen	"Smarte Sensoren erobern Konsumelektronik, Industrie und Medizin"
2009	Frank Misselwitz (speaker), Dagmar Kubitza und Elisabeth Perzborn, Bayer Schering Pharma AG, Wuppertal	"Thrombosen verhindern – eine Tablette kann Leben retten"
2010	Peter Post (speaker), Markus Fischer, Andrzej Grzesiak*, Festo AG & Co. KG., Esslingen, *Fraunhofer-Institut für Automatisierung und Produktionstechnik (IPA), Stuttgart	"Vorbild Elefantenrüssel – ein Hightech-Helfer für Industrie und Haushalt"
2011	Karl Leo (speaker), Jan Blochwitz-Nimoth, Martin Pfeiffer, TU Dresden, Novaled AG, Heliatek GmbH, Dresden	"Organische Elektronik – mehr Licht und Energie aus hauchdünnen Molekülschichten"
2012	Birger Kollmeier (speaker), Volker Hohmann, Torsten Niederdränk, Carl von Ossietzky Universität Oldenburg und *Siemens AG, München	"Binaurale Hörgeräte – räumliches Hören für alle"
2013	Jens König (speaker, Bosch), Stefan Nolte, Dirk Sutter, Robert Bosch GmbH mit dem Entwicklungszentrum Schwieberdingen, Friedrich-Schiller-Universität Jena, Fraunhofer-Institut für Angewandte Optik und Feinmechanik, Jena, TRUMPF Laser GmbH + Co. KG, Schramberg	"Ultrakurzpulslaser für die industrielle Massenfertigung – produzieren mit Lichtblitzen"
2014	Stephanie Mittermaier (speaker), Peter Eisner and Katrin Petersen (Prolupin GmbH, Grimmen) and Fraunhofer-Institut für Verfahrenstechnik und Verpackung	"Lebensmittelzutaten aus Lupinen – Beitrag zu ausgewogener Ernährung und verbesserter Proteinversorgung"
2015	Ardeschir Ghofrani (Speaker), Reiner Frey, Johannes-Peter Stasch (Bayer Pharma AG, Wuppertal) Justus-Liebig-Universität Gießen	"Entlastung für Herz und Lunge – vom Nitroglyzerin zu innovativen Therapien" (Riociguat)
2016	Manfred Curbach (Speaker), Chokri Cherif, Peter Offermann – TU Dresden	"Das faszinierende Material Carbonbeton – sparsam, schonend, schön"
2017	Sami Haddadin (Speaker), Simon Haddadin, Sven Parusel, Leibniz University Hannover, FRANKA EMIKA GmbH, München	"Mittelpunkt Mensch – Roboterassistenten für eine leichtere Zukunft"
2018	Helga Rübsamen-Schaeff (Speaker), Holger Zimmermann, AiCuris Anti-infective Cures GmbH, Wuppertal	"Schutz bei fehlendem Immunsystem – die lebensrettende Innovation gegen gefährliche Viren"
2019	Alexander Rinke (Speaker), Bastian Nominacher, Martin Klenk, Celonis, München	"Process mining – Schlüsseltechnologie für die Zukunft der Arbeit und Wertschöpfung in Unternehmen"
2020	Peter Kürz (Speaker, Carl Zeiss SMT), Michael Kösters (TRUMPF Lasersystems for Semiconductors Manufacturing GmbH) and Sergiy Yulin (Fraunhofer Institute for Applied Optics and Precision Engineering)	"EUV-Lithographie – neues Licht für das digitale Zeitalter"
2021	Uğur Şahin (Speaker), Özlem Türeci, Christoph Huber, Katalin Karikó, BioNTech SE, Mainz	"mRNA vaccines for humanity – the first COVID-19 vaccine ushers in a new era in medicine"
2022	Thomas Kalkbrenner (Speaker), Jörg Siebenmorgen and Ralf Wolleschensky from Carl Zeiss Microscopy in Jena	"Exploring the basics of life – a novel microscope for gentle 3D imaging of living cells"
2023	Stephan Biber (Speaker, Siemens Healthineers AG, Erlangen), David M. Grodzki (Siemens Healthineers AG, Erlangen), Michael Uder (Uniklinikum Erlangen)	Open to all – a new MRT for the world
2024	Norwin von Malm (Speaker, ams-OSRAM International GmbH, Regensburg), Stefan Grötsch (ams-OSRAM International GmbH, Regensburg), Hermann Oppermann (Fraunhofer IZM, Berlin)	Digital light – intelligent LED technology for tomorrow's world
2025	Christoffer Uhr (Speaker), Pierre Andrieu, Kai Weeber (Robert Bosch GmbH, Stuttgart)	Powerhouse for the climate – electric long-haul trucks powered by hydrogen
2026	Christian Koos (Speaker, Karlsruher Institut für Technologie), Matthias Lauerman (Vanguard Automation) and Philipp Dietrich (Keystone Photonics)	3D Printing on the nanoscale – Photonic microchips and light bridges for the digital future
