= Festo =

German automation company

Festo SE & Co. KG
- Type: SE & Co. KG
- Industry: Automation
- Founded: 1925
- Headquarters: Esslingen am Neckar, Germany
- Key people: Thomas Böck (CEO)
- Revenue: €3.33 billion (2025)
- Number of employees: 20,600 (2025)
- Website: www.festo.com

Festo SE & Co. KG is a German automation technology company headquartered in Esslingen am Neckar, Baden-Württemberg. It is part of the Festo Group, a family-owned group of companies active in pneumatic and electric automation technology as well as technical education through Festo Didactic.

Festo develops and manufactures products and systems for factory and process automation, including pneumatic, electric and digital drive technology. The company operates internationally and invests more than eight percent of its annual revenue in research and development.

== History ==
=== Founding and early years ===
In April 1925, Albert Fezer and Gottlieb Stoll founded the company Fezer & Stoll to manufacture woodworking machinery. The name "Festo" is derived from the founders' surnames. After Fezer left the company, Gottlieb Stoll assumed sole responsibility for its management.

In 1926, the company filed a patent application for a universal woodworking machine. This was followed by the development and manufacture of additional stationary and portable woodworking machines.

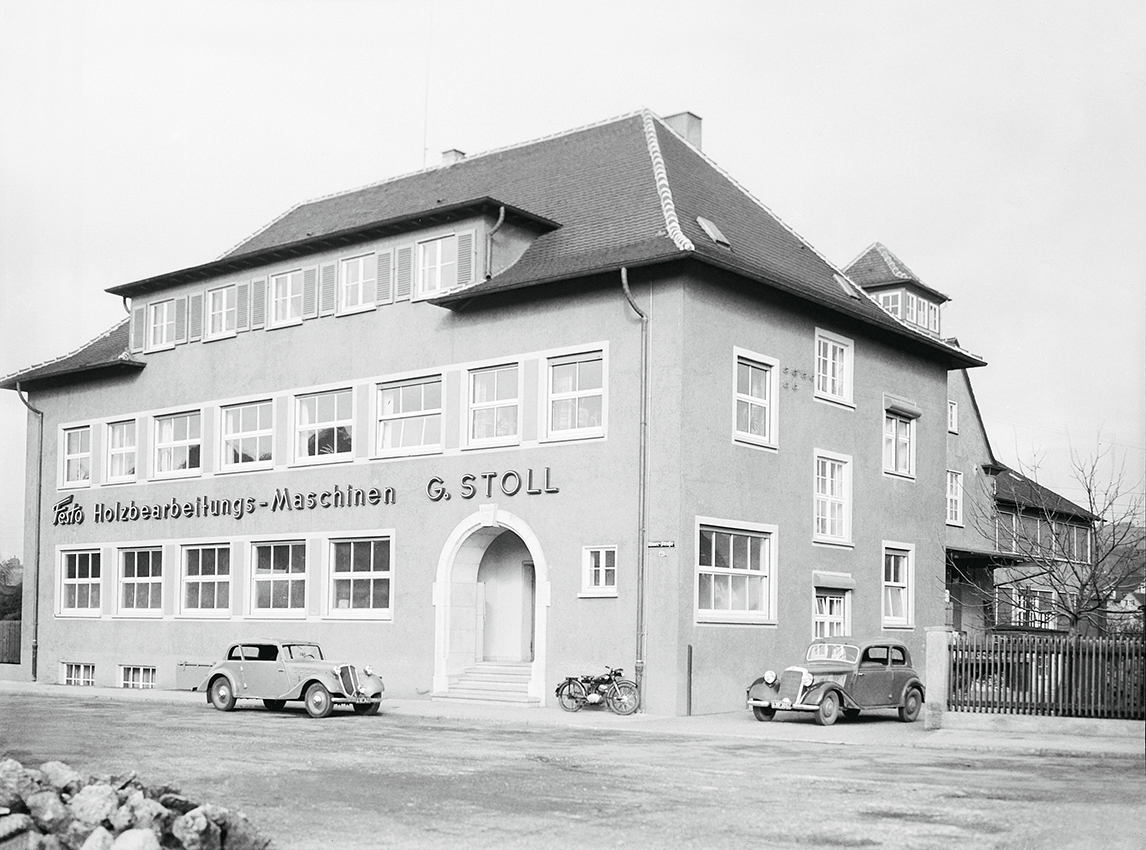
Festo's first company headquarters was established on Ulmer Strasse in Esslingen am Neckar in the late 1930s.

=== Pneumatics and international expansion ===
In 1950, Dr. Kurt Stoll, the eldest son of Gottlieb Stoll, became acquainted with pneumatic technology during a visit to the International Trade Fair in Chicago. Recognizing its potential for industrial applications, he initiated the company's entry into pneumatics.

Festo introduced its first pneumatic products in 1955 and established the business unit Festo Pneumatic.

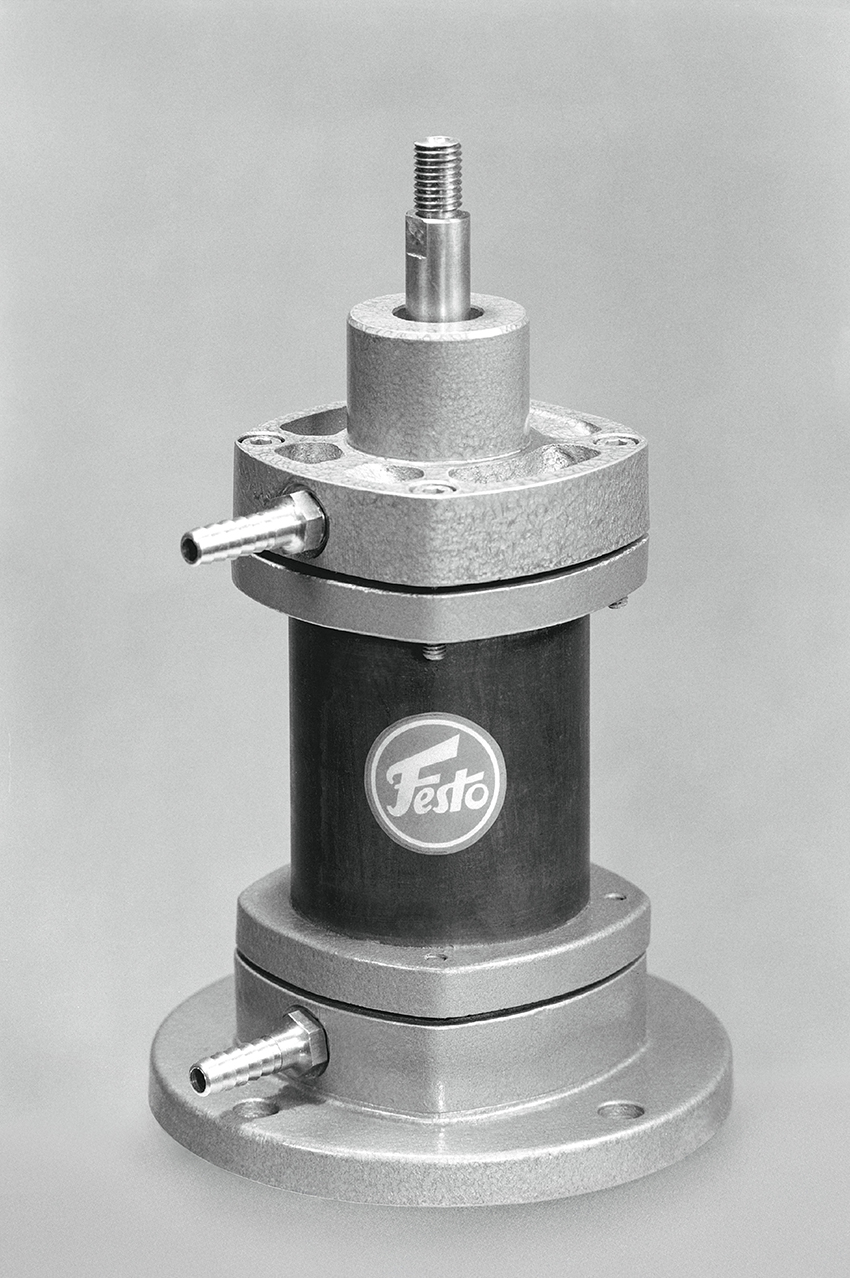
The double-acting cylinder type DV was among the first products in the company's pneumatic portfolio.

The company established its first international subsidiary in Italy in 1956. Under the leadership of Dr. Wilfried Stoll, Festo continued its international expansion through the establishment of subsidiaries in numerous countries. In 1967, Festo Australia became the company's first subsidiary outside Europe.

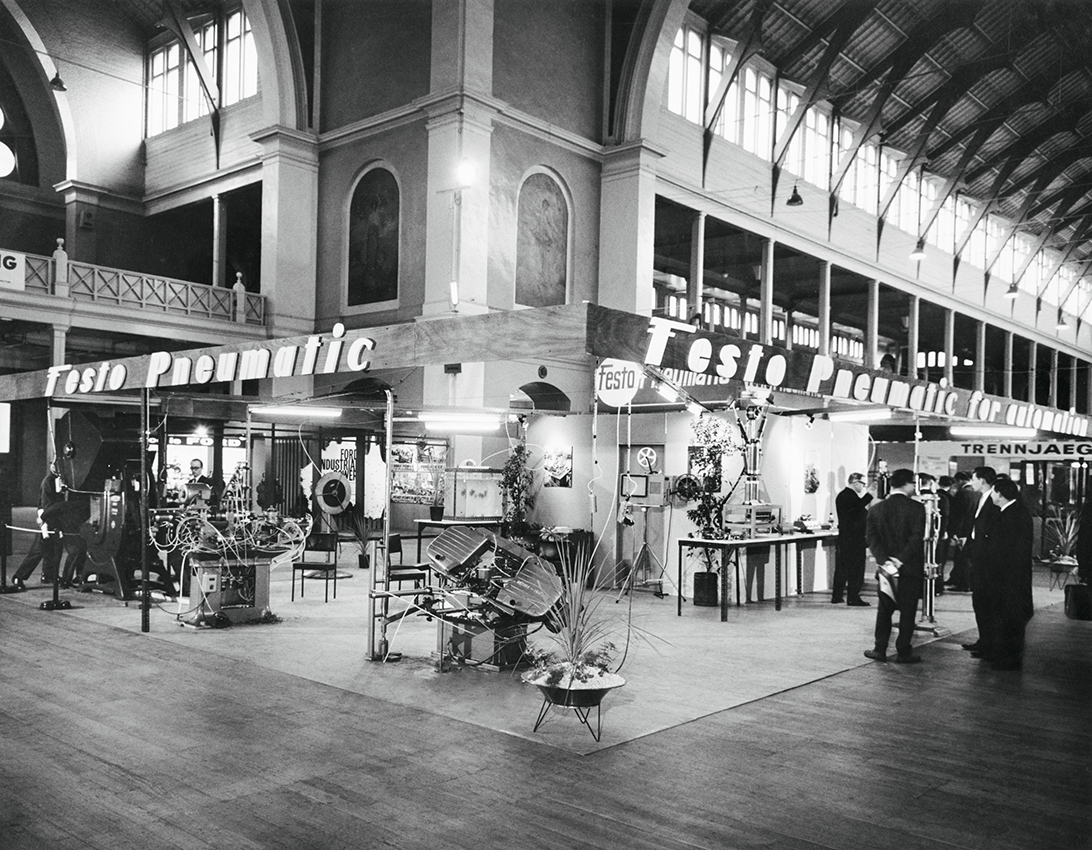
Festo Pneumatic exhibition stand at the Royal Exhibition Building in Melbourne, Australia, 1967

In Germany, Festo expanded its operations with the establishment of a dedicated pneumatics facility in Esslingen-Berkheim in 1962, bringing together administration and production. The site remains the company's global headquarters. An additional production facility was acquired in Rohrbach, Saarland, in 1968.

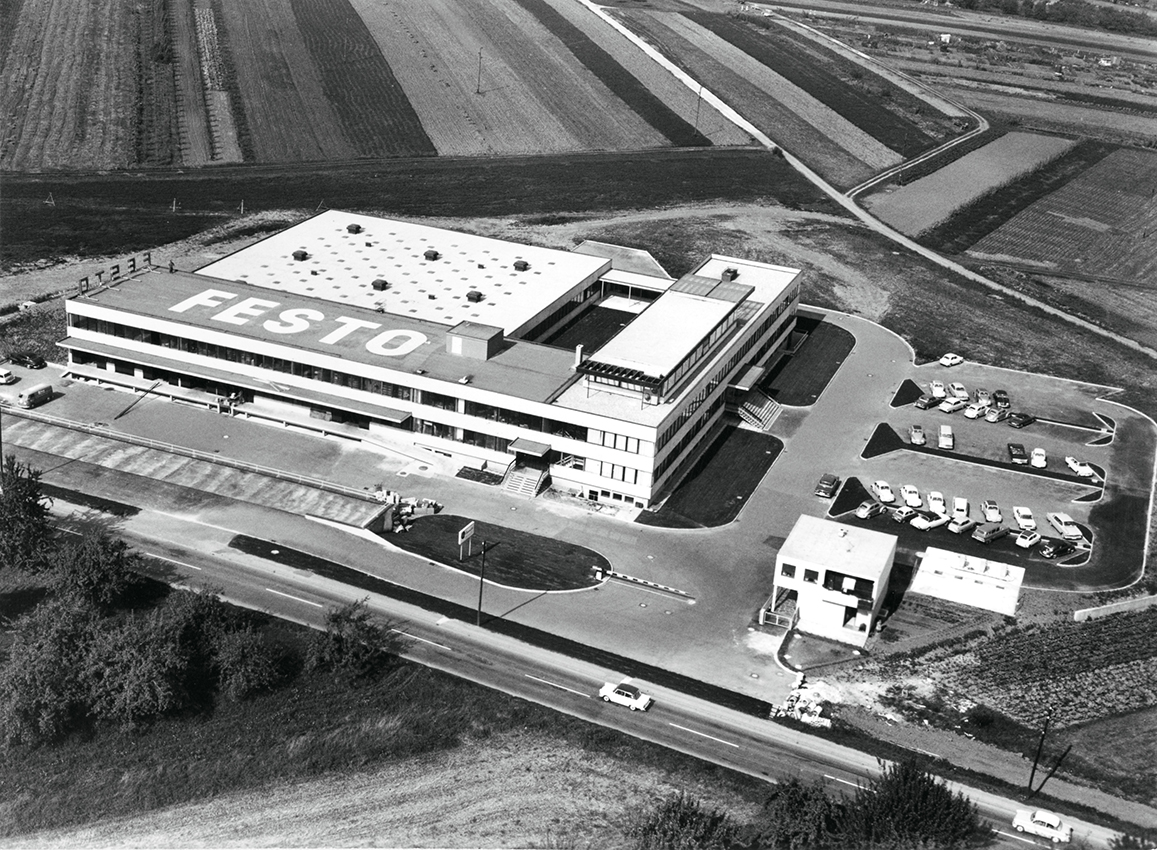
In 1962, the Festo Pneumatic division relocated to Esslingen Berkheim.

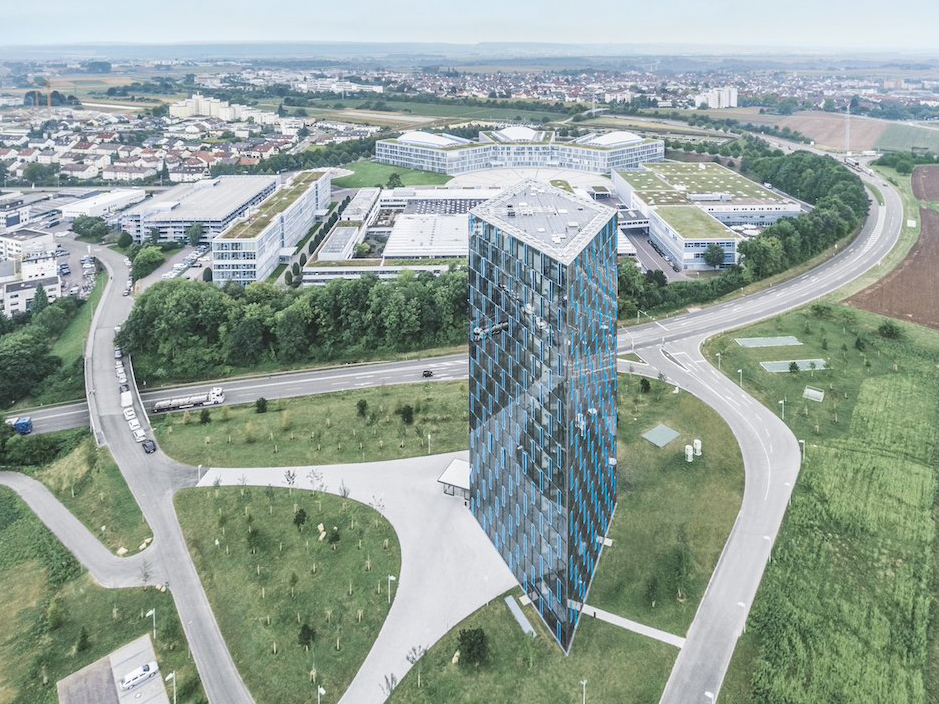
The site remains the company's global headquarters.

During the 1970s, Festo expanded its activities beyond pneumatics into fields including technical education, electronics, sensor technology, and control engineering. Development of electronic control technology began in 1976, and in 1979 the company introduced its first programmable logic controller (PLC), the FPC 606.

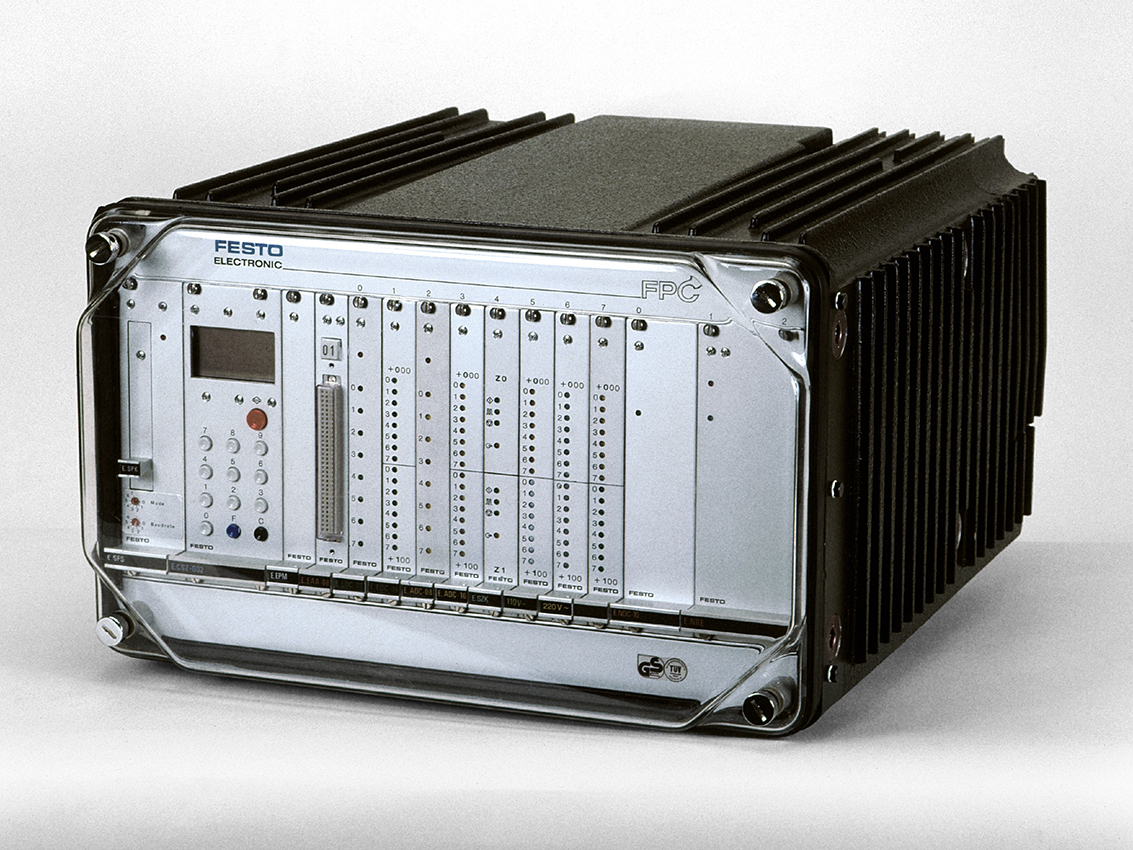
In 1979, Festo presented its first programmable logic controller (PLC), the FPC 606, at the Hannover Messe.

In 1989, Festo introduced the valve terminal, which combined pneumatic valves and their electrical control functions within a single unit. Developed for use in automated production systems, it simplified the installation and integration of pneumatic automation systems.

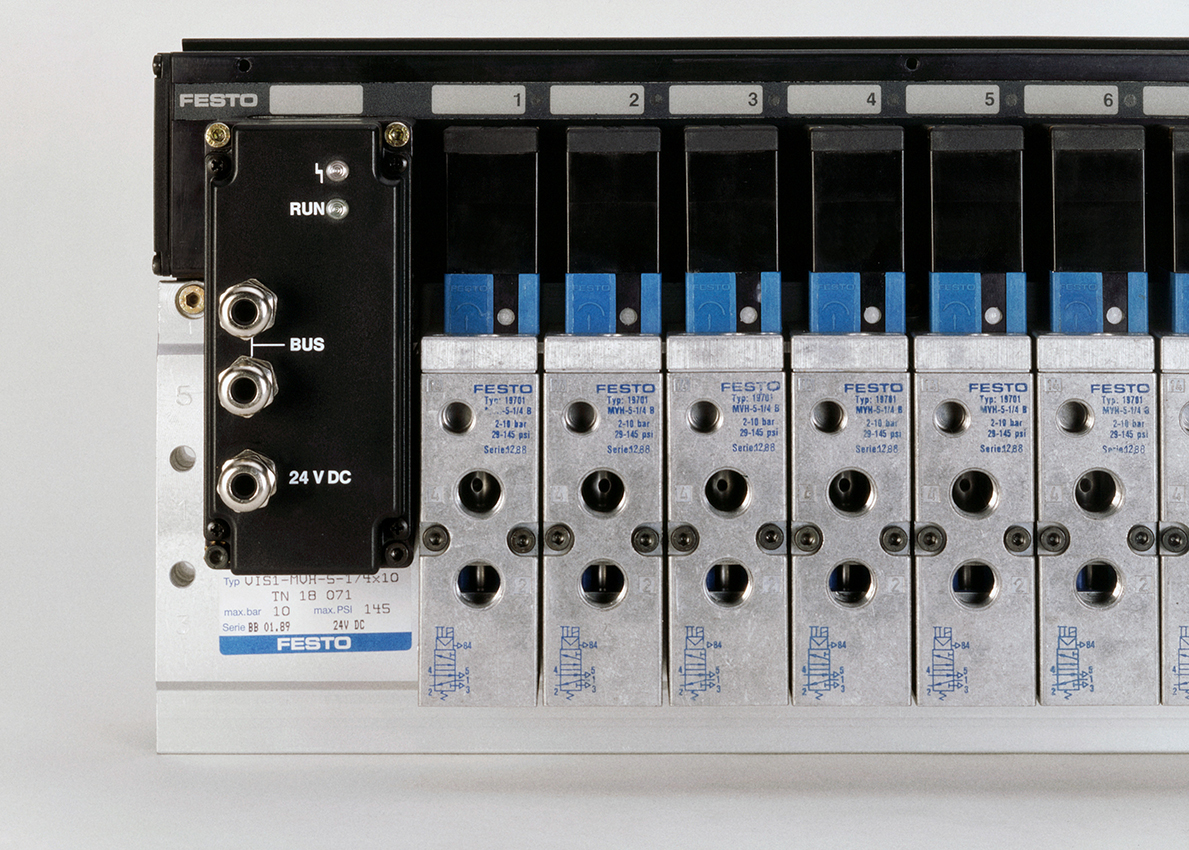
The first valve terminal, type VIMP-01, was introduced in 1989.

=== Festo Didactic ===
During the 1960s, Festo began developing training services to support the application of pneumatic technology. In 1965, the company published its first training manual, Introduction to Pneumatics, and established the Educational Relations business unit.

The educational activities were subsequently expanded and, in 1976, the division was renamed Festo Didactic. In 1980, Festo Didactic was established as an independent company.

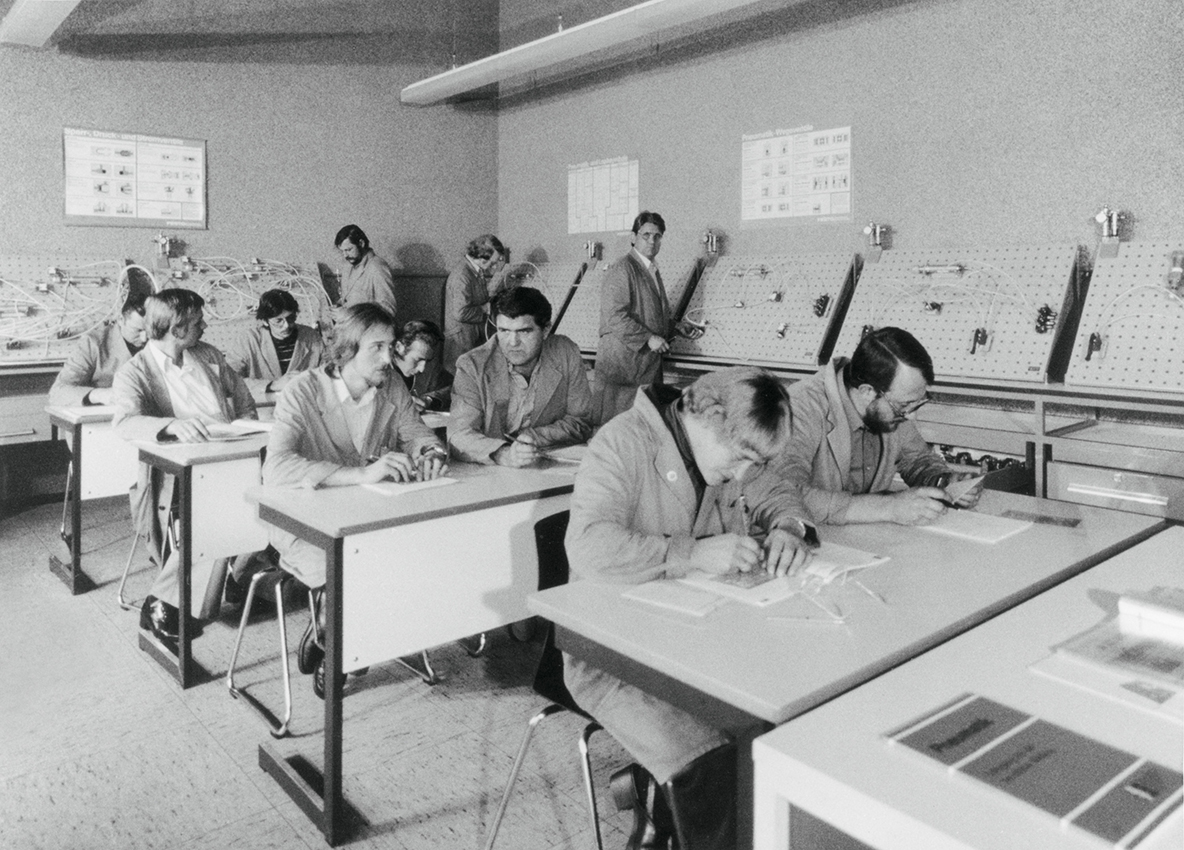
A Festo Didactic training session in the 1970s

=== Separation of Festo and Festool ===
In 2000, Festo and Festool were separated through a corporate division. Following the separation, both companies continued to operate as independent corporate groups.

== Business areas ==
=== Automation ===
Festo develops and manufactures products and systems for factory and process automation.

==== Pneumatic automation ====
Pneumatic automation is one of Festo's principal business areas. The portfolio includes pneumatic drives, cylinders, valves, valve terminals, compressed-air preparation equipment, vacuum technology, and grippers.

==== Electric automation ====
Festo's electric automation portfolio comprises drive, motion-control, and handling technologies for industrial automation. Product categories include electric actuators, servo drives, servo motors, handling systems, and industrial robots.

==== Software and digital technologies ====
In addition, Festo develops software and digital technologies for industrial automation applications, including systems for machine operation, maintenance, production monitoring, and the analysis of production and process data, including applications based on artificial intelligence.

==== Industry segments ====
Festo products are used in a range of industries, including automotive and automotive suppliers, electrical and electronics manufacturing, intralogistics, life sciences, food and beverage processing, packaging, semiconductor manufacturing, and hydrogen-related applications.

Applications include manufacturing and assembly processes for tasks such as joining, rotating, gripping, positioning, connecting, holding, testing, and inspecting components, assemblies, and finished products.

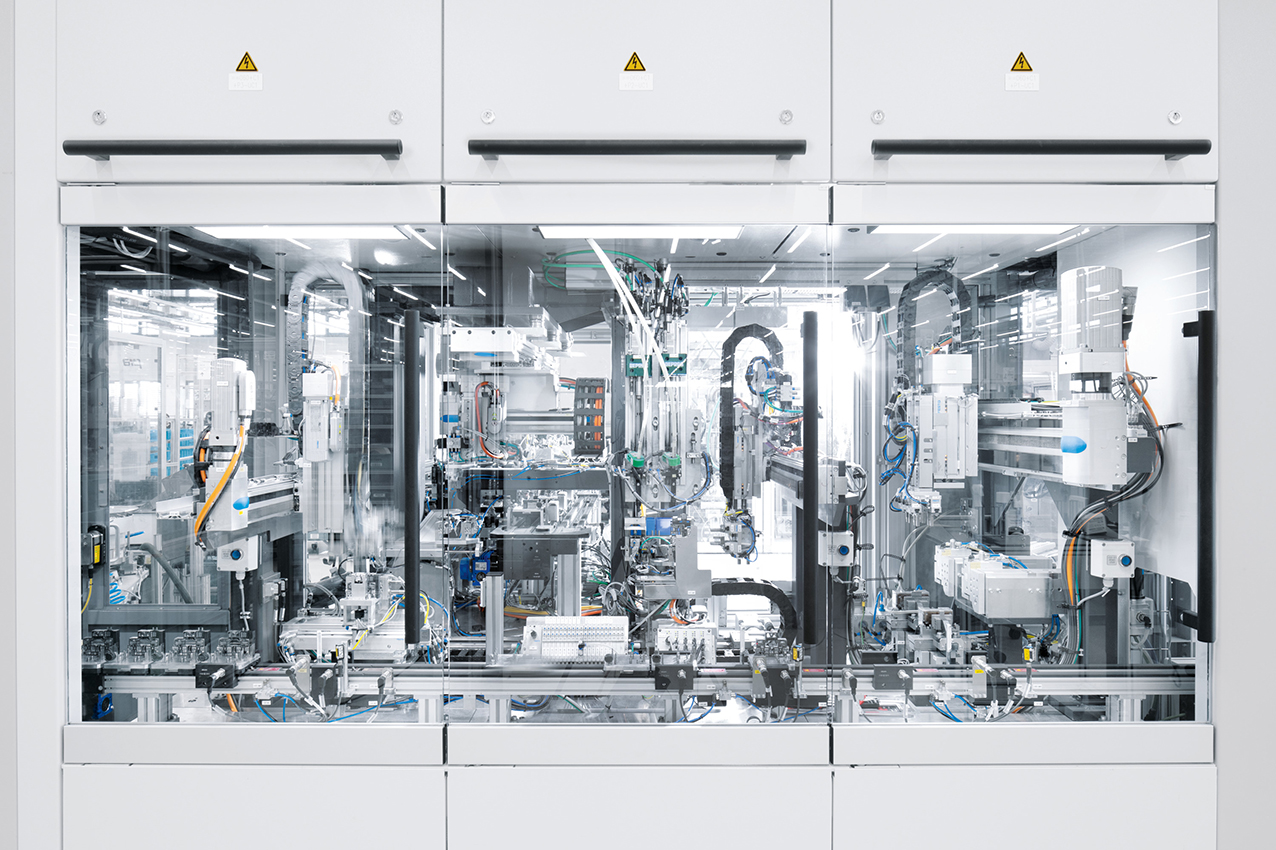
Fully automated production combining pneumatic and electric automation technology

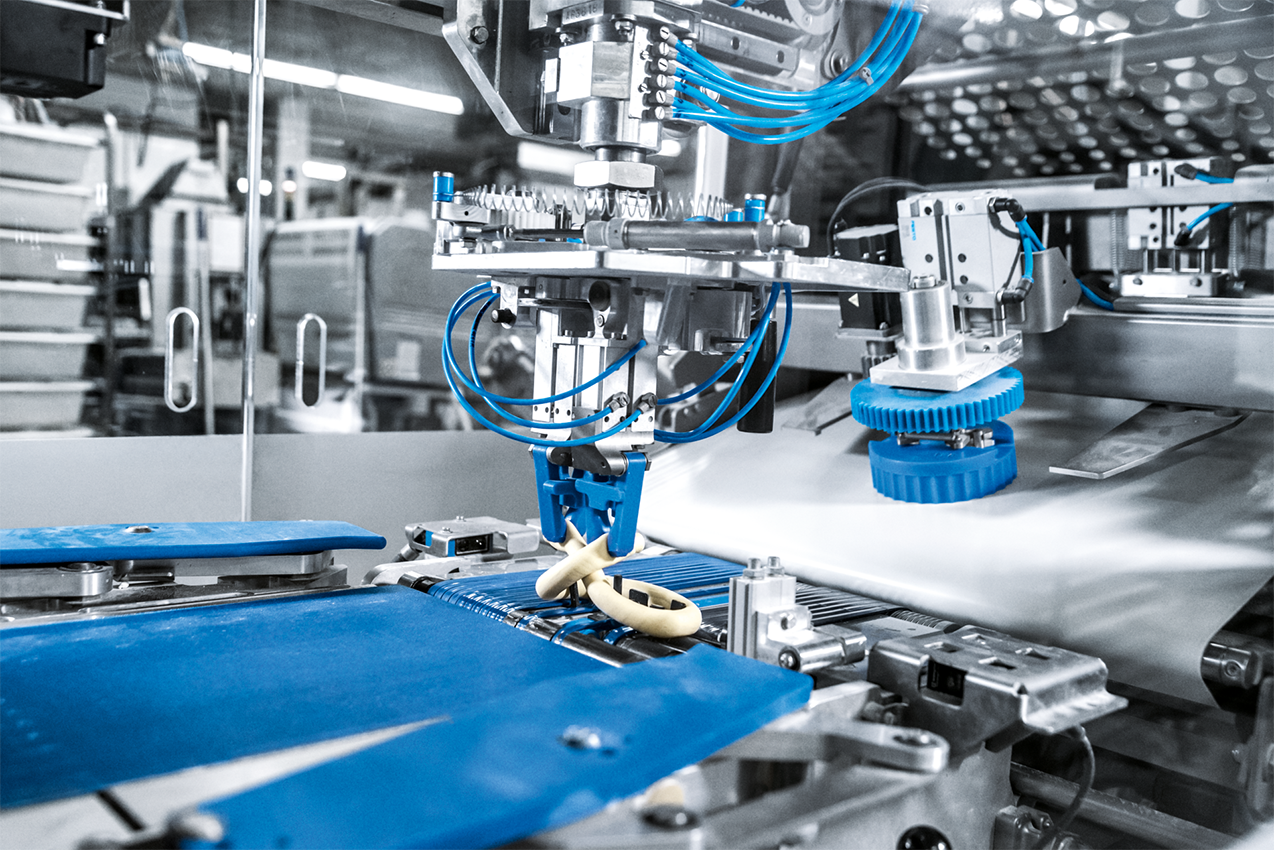
Pretzel twisting machine equipped with Festo pneumatic components

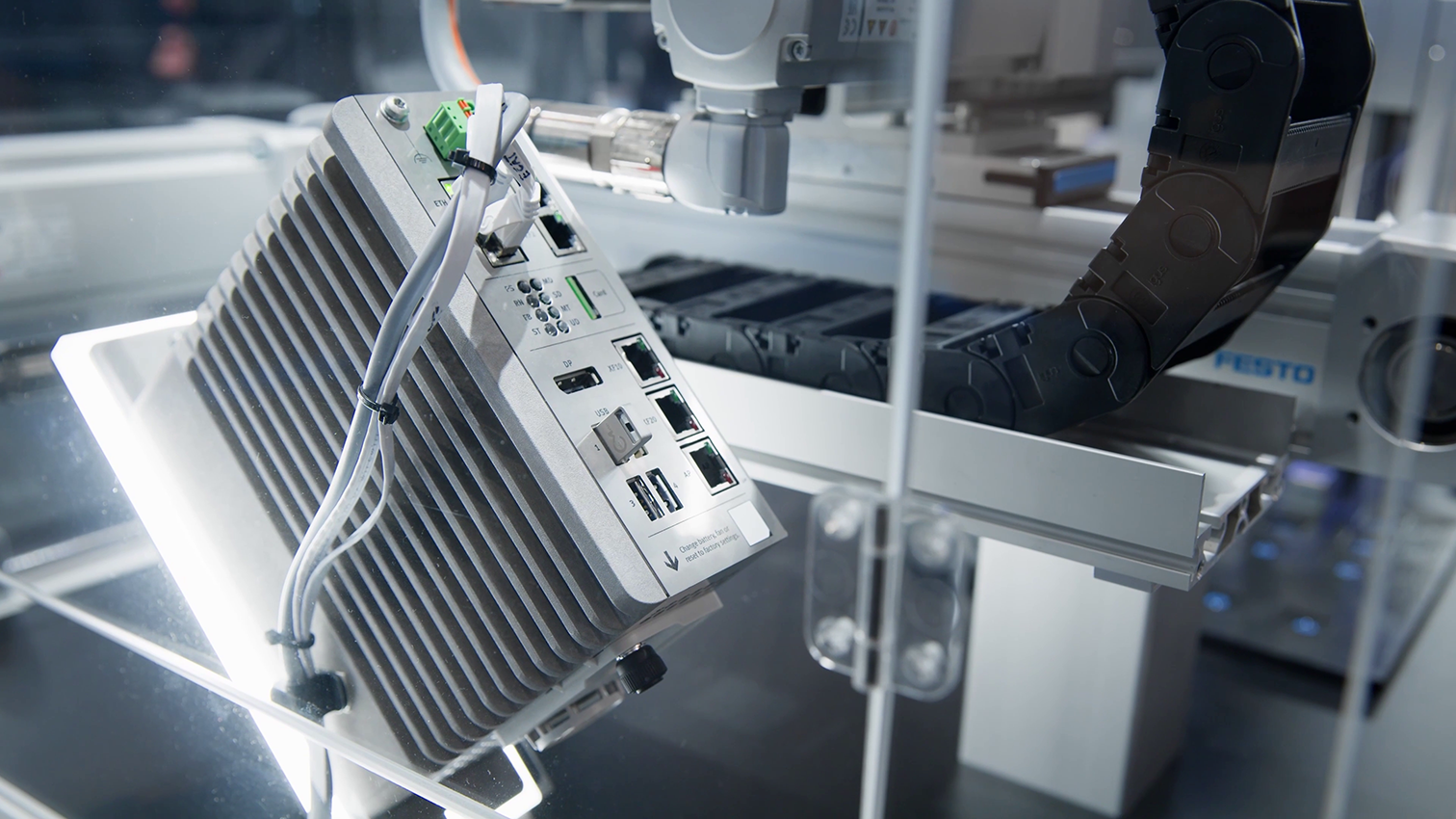
Festo CEPE control system

=== Technical education ===
Festo Didactic is the technical education and training division of the Festo Group. It develops learning systems and educational programs for schools, universities, vocational education and training institutions, and industrial companies.

Its activities include the provision of teaching and learning systems, the planning and equipping of training facilities, and training and consulting services for technical education. Festo Didactic also develops educational programs for technical occupations and industrial applications.

Festo has been a partner of WorldSkills International since 1991 and has served as a Global Premium Partner of the organization since 2025. It supports international skills competitions and provides equipment for disciplines including mechatronics, water technology, Industry 4.0, and renewable energy.

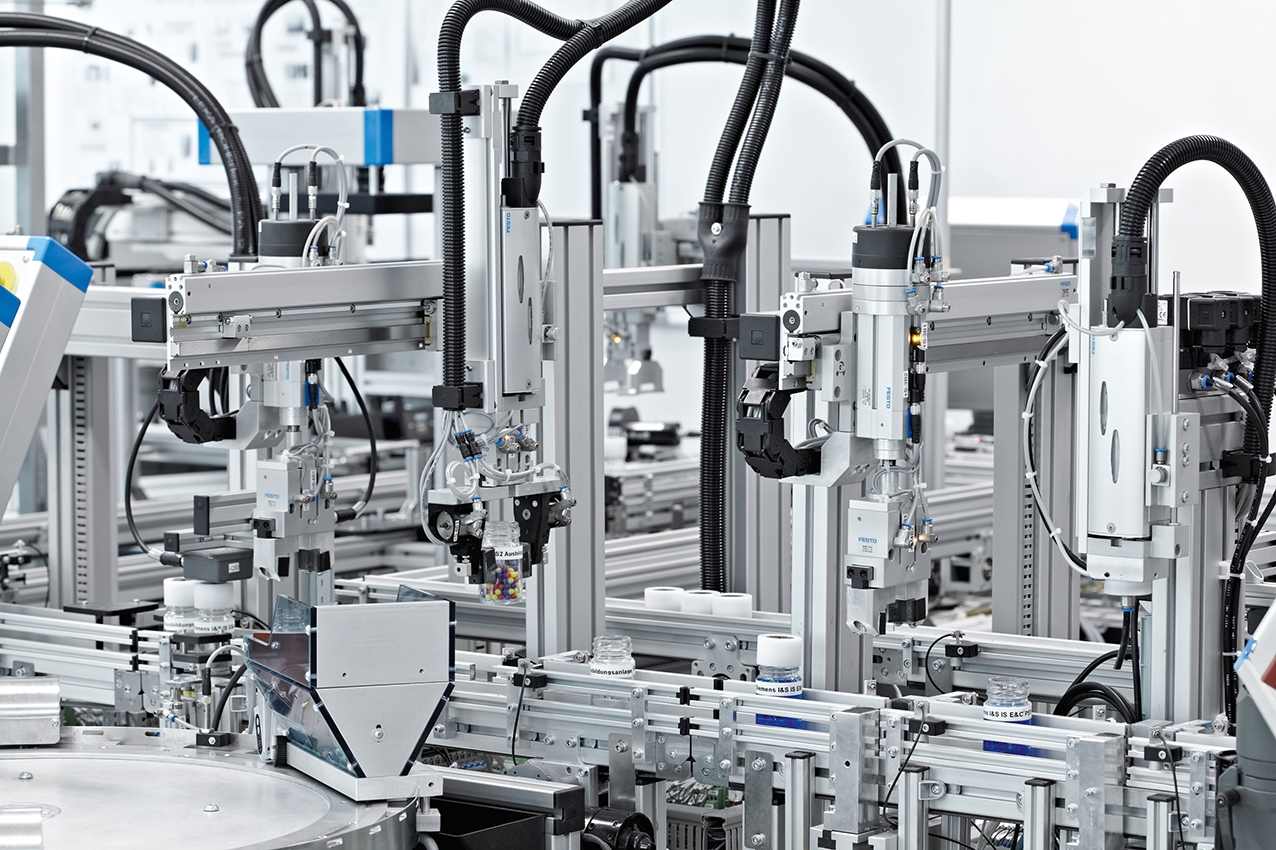
Festo Didactic learning systems

== Research and innovation ==
Festo is involved in research and development activities in the fields of automation technology, bionics, and advanced motion systems. Through the Bionic Learning Network, an interdisciplinary research initiative involving universities, research institutes, and other partners, the company explores the transfer of biological principles to technical applications.

Examples of projects developed within this framework include the SmartBird, BionicOpter, BionicSwift, BionicBee, and AirJelly. One outcome of these activities was the Bionic Handling Assistant, which received the German Future Prize in 2010.

Since 2013, Festo has pursued research into the application of superconductivity in automation technology through its SupraMotion program. The technology is designed to enable the contactless levitation and movement of objects for industrial applications.

As part of its centennial celebrations, the company presented future technologies at the Hannover Messe in 2025, including soft robotics concepts and experimental motion technologies showcased in the Incredible Machine installation.

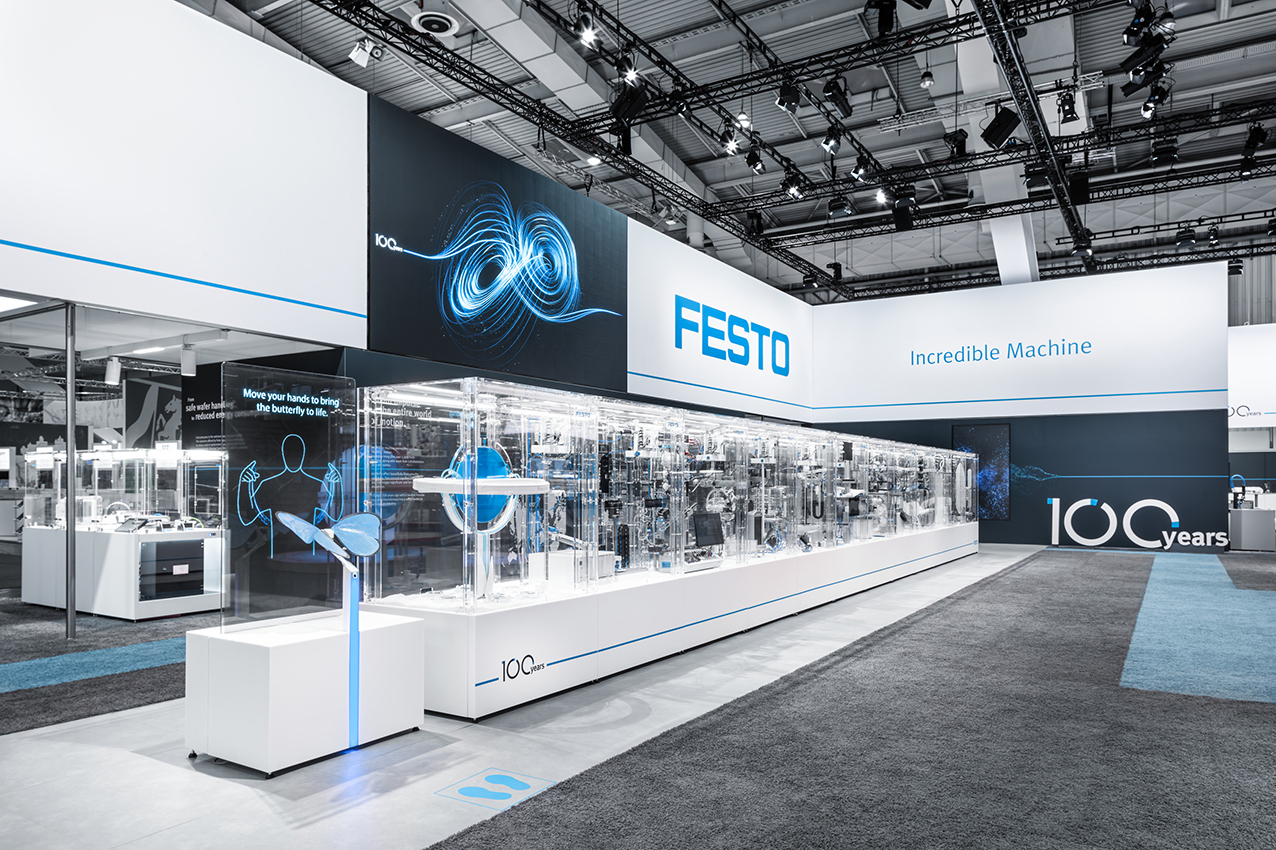
The Incredible Machine at the Festo exhibition stand, Hannover Messe trade fair 2025

== Sustainability ==
Festo has adopted sustainability targets that are aligned with the United Nations Sustainable Development Goals (SDGs) and the objectives of the Paris Agreement.

In February 2025, the company's greenhouse-gas reduction targets were validated by the Science Based Targets initiative (SBTi). The targets include a commitment to achieve net-zero greenhouse gas emissions across the company's value chain by 2050.

In 2024, Festo received the German Sustainability Award in the category "Hydraulics, Pumps and Compressors".
