= Festo SmartBird =

SmartBird
- Computer generated image of SmartBird.

General information
- Type: UAV
- Manufacturer: Festo

SmartBird is an autonomous ornithopter created by Festo's Bionic Learning Network with an emphasis on better aerodynamics and maneuverability. It is an ornithopter modeled on the herring gull. It has a mass of 450 grams and a wingspan of 1.96 meters. In April 2011 the SmartBird was unveiled at the Hanover Fair.

The natural wingbeat of a bird was emulated by using bionics technology to decipher bird flight. Based on the flight of a herring gull, Smartbird differs from previous flapping wing attempts in that it can take off, fly and land by itself. Its wings not only beat up and down, but deliberately twist. This is done by an active torsion mechanism, which provides both lift and propulsion.

Smartbird is constructed of polyurethane foam and carbon fiber and is powered by a 135 brushless motor running at 23 watts.

== Lift and propulsion ==
External videos
- Short documentary about the creation of SmartBird, YouTube

Flight occurs in a manner very similar to that of real birds. The vertical motion of the wings is provided by an electric motor in the body of the bird. It is connected to two wheels that attach to rods in the wings in a manner similar to steam locomotives. Inside the wings are torsional servo motors that adjust the wings' angle of attack to provide forward motion. Directional control is provided by moving the tail and head.
