= Heliatek =

German solar film company

- Company type: Private company
- Industry: Solar power
- Founded: 2006; 19 years ago
- Founder: Technical University of Dresden and University of Ulm
- Headquarters: Dresden, Germany
- Key people: Guido van Tartwijk
- Products: Solar film
- Website: heliatek.com

Heliatek is a German company headquartered in Dresden. The company develops and produces lightweight, flexible solar power films that is stable over a wide temperature range.

== History ==
The company was spun off in July 2006 from the Technical University of Dresden (IAPP) and the University of Ulm. The company's founding brought together the fields of organic optoelectronics and organic oligomer synthesis.

In 2011 the company was recognized, by an audience of non professionals in the field, by winning the German Future Prize. The World Economic Forum awarded the firm as a Technology Pioneer in 2015.
