= Freeletics =

Fitness app by Freeletics GmbH

Freeletics GmbH
- Type: Private (GmbH)
- Industry: Fitness
- Founded: March 2013; 13 years ago
- Headquarters: Munich, Germany
- Key people: Daniel Sobhani (CEO)
- Website: www.freeletics.com

Freeletics is a fitness app developed and published by Freeletics GmbH, based in Munich, Germany. The company reports having over 60 million users worldwide.

== Overview ==
Freeletics offers high-intensity training programs focused on strength and endurance, without the need for equipment. The workouts are delivered through a virtual coach and draw on principles from calisthenics and high-intensity training. Typical exercises include burpees, squats, lunges, sit-ups, push-ups, jumps, pull-ups, mountain climbers, jumping jacks, and sprints, usually completed in a fixed order and timed. Sessions typically last no longer than 45 minutes.

The app also includes a nutrition coach and recipe suggestions, but no longer includes a shop for athletic wear. Users can train alone using the app or join self-organized group sessions in parks around the world. Local ambassadors help introduce new users to the program.

== History ==
Freeletics was founded in March 2013 by Mehmet Yilmaz, Joshua Cornelius, and Andrej Matijczak at the Center for Digital Technology and Management in Munich. The initial product launch consisted of a YouTube video, a newsletter, and three PDFs. The first training sessions took place in Munich's Maßmannpark.

In August 2018, Freeletics was acquired by Fitlab, Causeway Media Partners, Jazz Venture Partners, Courtside Ventures, Elysian Park Ventures, and Ward.Ventures for a reported high eight-figure amount. In October 2017, the company opened its first official Training Ground in Berlin's Monbijoupark.

In December 2018, Freeletics completed a Series A funding round worth $45 million. This was followed by a $25 million Series B round in September 2020.

In November 2021, Freeletics announced the launch of “STÆDIUM”, an expansion into AI-supported weight training at home.
