= FutureSAX =

futureSAX is a company of the Free State of Saxony and is financed with tax revenues based on the budget approved by the members of the Saxon State Parliament. It aims to support start-ups and the founding of companies free of charge in a mission of the Free State of Saxony with various events, formats and grants.

== Procedure ==
futureSAX is divided into three competition phases, in which the competing participants are aided under consultation in the development of their own business plans. During the course of the competition, the business ideas continually evolve; the participants profit from free seminar programs and the opportunity to correspond with others in their industry as well as sponsors of the competition.

On the basis of a business or development idea (phase one), the production of a business and marketing strategy develops (phase two) and a detailed and professional business plan (phase three) is constructed. Each phase ends with a confidential evaluation of the practicality of the business ideas by independent juries.

The business plans that have the most judicial approval are awarded with prize money. For the first two award ceremonies, four teams are awarded - one team each per the industries of technology, ITK, bio/nano-technology, and service. With the third award ceremony, five prizes in the three categories of “start-ups”, “growth”, and “special university prize” are awarded.

Apart from the phase's closing jury vote, the technical support is guaranteed to the competitors by sponsors, such as regularly offered coaching and seminar meetings about start-up relevant information.

Apart from the technical support with the development of business plans through futureSAX, the opportunity is granted to the competitors to establish contacts to financial sources such as Venture Capitalists, etc. at the futureSAX networking seminars.

== History ==
On 7 November 2002, futureSAX started as a Saxony industry competition for start-ups and recent growth enterprises. Thus, it replaced the IT Business Plan Competition, which was exclusive for the IT-industry that had existed since 1999 and was also presented by futureSAX.

Since 2002, more than 490 start-ups and entrepreneurs, as well as 10,000 participants in net-working meetings and workshops, have taken part in futureSAX. However, in the 2006 competition, 140 teams took part and 188 business ideas, marketing concepts, and business plans were submitted. During the years 2003 through 2005, the competition grew approximately 67 percent.

On October 5, 2006, futureSAX launched into its fifth open-industry competition, which ran until 18 July 2007. The total prize money amounted to 68,000 euros.

Since 2018, futureSAX is officially a start-up of the Saxon Free State. The shareholders of the new GmbH are the Free State of Saxony and the Saxony Economic Development Corporation (WFS).
