= Konux =

Internet of things start up company (e. 2014)

KONUX GmbH
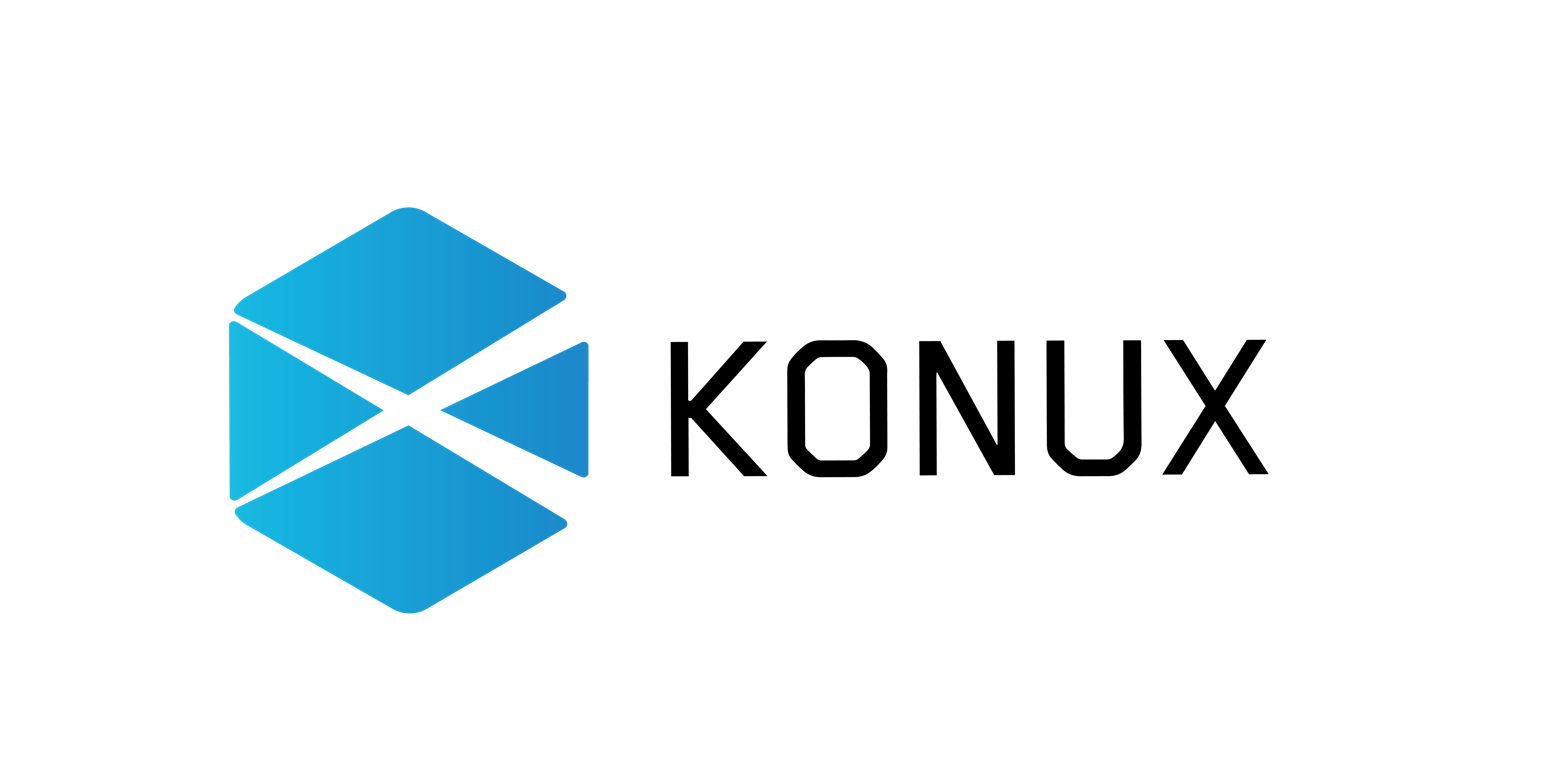
- Company type: GmbH
- Industry: Software; Railway
- Founded: 2014
- Founders: Andreas Kunze; Dennis Humhal; Maximilian Hasler; Vlad Lata
- Headquarters: Munich, Germany, Europe
- Area served: Worldwide
- Products: KONUX Predictive Maintenance System
- Number of employees: 51-200
- Website: www.konux.com

Konux (stylised as KONUX) is a German AI/IoT (Internet of Things) company. The company is headquartered in Munich, Germany, and is registered in Palo Alto, California, as an American corporation (Inc.).

== History ==
KONUX was founded in 2014 by Andreas Loy (previously Kunze), Dennis Humhal, Vlad Lata, and Maximilian Hasler. The four students from different disciplines had met at their alma mater, the Technical University of Munich (TUM), where they developed the basic idea of using sensor data to increase the availability of industrial facilities through predictive maintenance. Using a combination of sensors and artificial intelligence-based analytics software, they devised a system that can monitor assets and thereby also predict maintenance needs. The founders focused on rail technology and, in their first application, specifically on railway switches and crossings.

For their project, they received initial funding (seed round) of $2 million from Silicon Valley investors, led by Michael Baum, founder and CEO of the Big Data software company Splunk. Other investors included the Google investor, Andreas von Bechtolsheim, and the venture capitalist firm New Enterprise Associates (NEA). In three further financing rounds, KONUX has raised a total of over US$130 million to date. Later investors included MIG-Funds, and Athos, the family office of the Strüngmann brothers, which is also the largest shareholder of the biotechnology company BioNTech.

KONUX's IoT devices have been utilized on switches in Deutsche Bahn's high-speed network since 2015. They are intended to increase the availability of the track network and thus improve the punctuality of trains. At the beginning of 2020, KONUX was working for a total of ten international customers in Europe and Asia. In the same year, KONUX won a tender from Deutsche Bahn to monitor the condition of switches as critical elements of the rail infrastructure. In the initial phase of this project, the company completed the digitalization of more than 650 switches in mid-August 2021. The long-term framework agreement is Deutsche Bahn's first-ever cloud-based software-as-a-service (SaaS) infrastructure project. In 2023 Deutsche Bahn extended the roll-out to 3500 additional assets on their busiest routes.

== Products ==
KONUX Switch is a predictive maintenance system for rail switches. It is delivered as software-as-a-service (SaaS) and uses IIoT devices and artificial intelligence to continuously and autonomously monitors the condition of key switch components such as the track bed and frog. The KONUX system provides infrastructure managers with a forecast of how the condition of the switches will develop over time, enabling them to prevent failures and optimize their maintenance planning.

== Recognition ==
- June 2018 – CogX Award in the category "Outstanding Innovations with Artificial Intelligence in Sensor Technology"
- June 2017 – Presidential Entrepreneurship Award 2017 from the Technical University of Munich (TUM).
- February 2017 – Technology pioneer, one of the 30 most important technology start-ups in the world, designated by the World Economic Forum (WEF).
- July 2016 – "The Spark - the German Digital Prize". The prize is awarded annually by business newspaper Handelsblatt and the management consultancy McKinsey.
- October 2016 – German Mobility Prize, the Federal Ministry of Transport and Digital Infrastructure.
- 2019 - Global deep tech investment firm Boundary Holding announced its investment in Konux.
