= Outfittery =

German clothing online personal shopping service

Outfittery GmbH is a German online personal shopping service founded by Julia Bösch. She came up with the idea of an online personal shopping service when a friend tried out a personal shopper service in New York. Together with the other cofounder Anna Alex she raised €50 million for their Berlin-based startup and established Outfittery in 2012. Outfittery combines Artificial Intelligence with real-life stylists to help customers find the right clothes. In 2018, Outfittery served 500,000 customers in eight European countries. Originally, the service was only available for menswear. In 2021, Outfittery started offering womenswear.

Company founder Bösch previously worked as Head of International Business Development at Zalando and as a student she went on a student exchange to Columbia Business School, where she saw many fellow students starting a business right after graduation. She was listed in the Forbes list of Europe's Top 50 Women in Tech 2018.
