= Textile-reinforced concrete =

Type of reinforced concrete

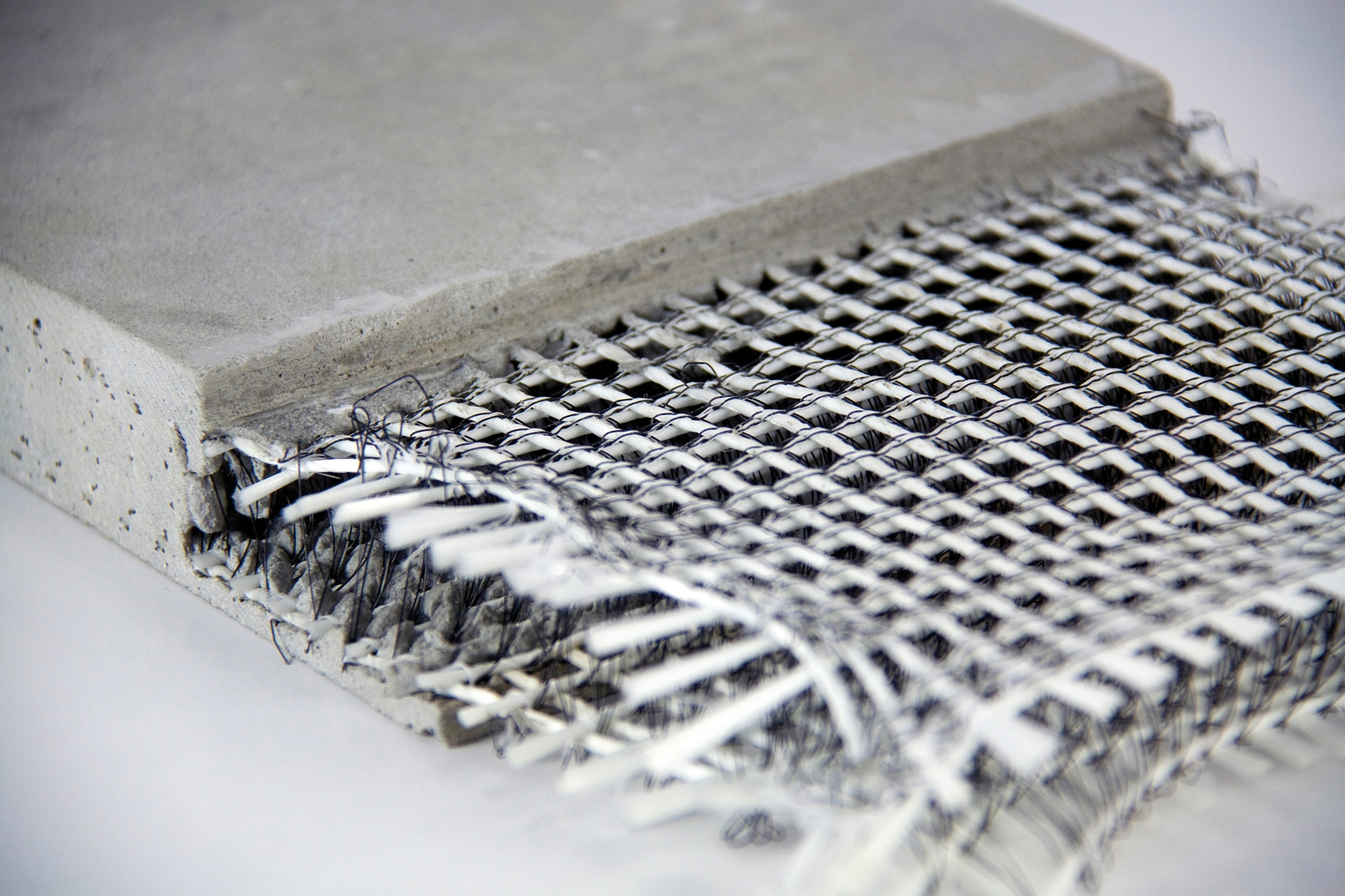
Close-up of a piece of textile-reinforced concrete

Textile-reinforced concrete is a type of reinforced concrete in which the usual steel reinforcing bars are replaced by textile materials. Instead of using a metal cage inside the concrete, this technique uses a fabric cage inside the same.

== Overview ==
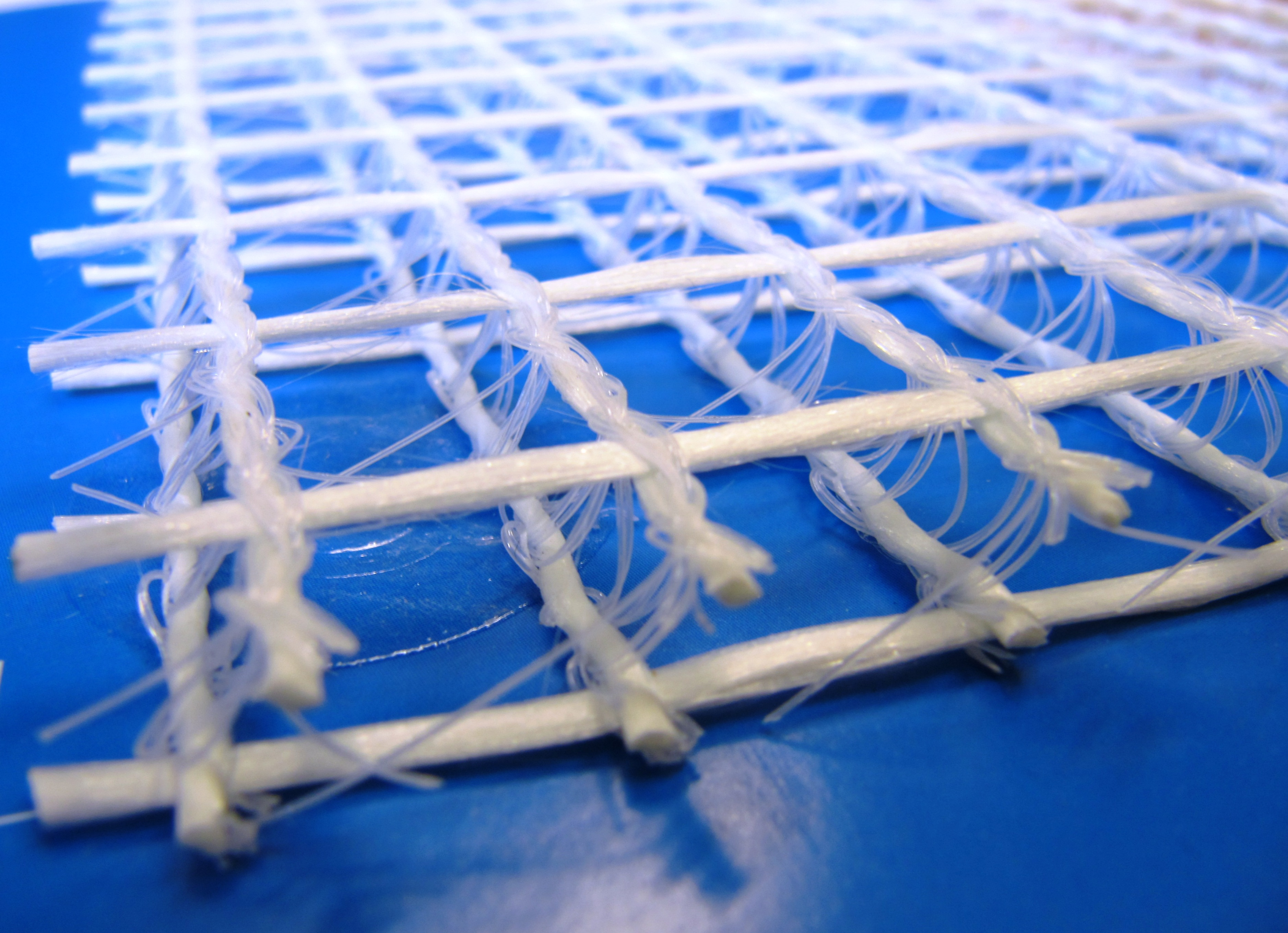
Glass fiber structure for use in textile-reinforced concrete

Materials with high tensile strengths with negligible elongation properties are reinforced with woven or nonwoven fabrics. The fibres used for making the fabric are of high tenacity like jute, glass fibre, Kevlar, polypropylene, polyamides (Nylon) etc. Recently, attention has been given to the use of plant-based fibers (either dispersed or as a fabric) in reinforcement of concrete. The use of plant-based fibers is promising but the individual components are subject to degradation due to the alkaline environment. The weaving of the fabric is done either in a coil fashion or in a layer fashion. Molten materials, ceramic clays, plastics or cement concrete are deposited on the base fabric in such a way that the inner fabric is completely wrapped with the concrete or plastic.

As a result of this sort of structure the resultant concrete becomes flexible from the inner side along with high strength provided by the outer materials. Various nonwoven structures also get priority to form the base structure. Special types of weaving machines are used to form spiral fabrics and layer fabrics are generally nonwoven.

== History ==
=== First patents ===
The initial creation of textile-reinforced concrete (TRC) began in the 1980s. Concepts for TRC originated from the Sächsisches Textilforschungs-institut e.V. STFI, a German institute focusing on textile technology. The first patent for textile-reinforced concrete design, granted in 1982, was for transportation related safety items. These items were specifically meant to be reinforced with materials other than steel. In 1988, a patent was awarded for a safety barrier that used a rope-like reinforcement as its design. This reinforcement was made from concrete waste and textiles, and the innovative arrangement and size of the reinforcing fibers inside was notable. The reinforcements were set in place so that the concrete could be poured in, and the size of the reinforcement was described using diameter and mesh size.

=== Concrete canoe and textile reinforced concrete ===
In 1996, German university students created two concrete canoes using textile reinforcement. One boat utilized alkali-resistant glass as its textile reinforcement. To manufacture the glass in a fabric, a process called Malimo-technique was used to keep the glass in one continuous yarn, such that it could be used to make the fabric. The other boat was constructed using carbon fiber fabric as its method of reinforcement. The boats competed in the 1996 Concrete Canoe Regatta in Dresden, Germany, and this was the first time that textile-reinforced concrete was brought to public attention. The boats received an award for their design.

== Construction ==
Four factors are important when constructing TRC, which include the quality of the concrete, the interaction between the textile and the concrete, the amount of fibers used, and the arrangement of the textile reinforcement inside the concrete.

The particle size of the concrete must be carefully selected. If the concrete is too coarse, it will not be able to permeate through the textile reinforcement. For the best results, fresh concrete should be used. To aid in adhesion, chemical admixtures can be added to help the fibers stick to the concrete.

The characteristic features of TRC are its thin structure and malleable nature, as well as its ability to retain a high tensile strength; this is due to reinforcement in the concrete that uses long continuous fibers that are woven in a specific direction in order to add strength. As the result of the varying strength and properties needed to support correct loading, there are many different types of yarns, textile weaves, and shapes that can be used in TRC. The textile begins with a yarn that is made of a continuous strand of either filaments or staples. The yarn is woven, knit, glued, braided or is left non-woven, depending on the needs of the project. Carbon, AR glass, and basalt are especially good materials for this process. Carbon has good tensile strength and low heat expansion, but is costly and has bad adhesion to concrete. Basalt is formed by melting basalt rock; it is more cost effective than carbon, and has a good tensile strength. The drawback of basalt is when it is placed in an alkali solution, such as concrete, it loses some of its volume of fibers, thus reducing its strength. This means a nano composite polymer coating must be applied to increase the longevity of the construction. AR glass has this problem, as well, but the positives of using AR glass in TRC structure, including its adhesion to concrete and low cost, outweigh these issues.

Textile-reinforced concrete is described as a strain-hardening composite. Strain-hardening composites use short fiber reinforcements, such as yarn made from carbon fiber, to strengthen a material. Strain-hardening requires the reinforcements and concrete matrix surrounding the reinforcement to be carefully designed in order to achieve the desired strength. The textile must be oriented in the correct direction during design to handle the main loading and stresses it is expected to hold. Types of weaves that can be used to make fabrics for TRC include plain weave, Leno weave, warp-knitted, and 3D spacer.

Another important aspect of textile-reinforced concrete is the permeability of the textile. Special attention must be paid to its structure, such that the textile is open enough for the concrete to flow through, while remaining stable enough to hold its own shape, since the placement of the reinforcement is vital to the final strength of the piece. The textile material must also have a high tensile strength, a high elongation before breaking, and a higher Young's Modulus than the concrete surrounding it.

The textile can be hand laid into the concrete or the process could be mechanized to increase efficiency. Different ways of creating textile-reinforced concrete vary from traditional form-work casts, all the way to Pultrusion. When making TRC using casting, the form work must be constructed, and the textile reinforcement must be pre-installed and ready for concrete to be poured in. After the concrete is poured and has had time to harden, the form-work is removed to reveal the structure. Another way of creating a TRC structure is lamination by hand. Similar to casting, a form-work must be created to house the concrete and textile; concrete is then spread evenly in the form work, and then the textile is laid on top. More concrete is poured on top, and a roller is used to push the concrete into the spaces in the textile; this is completed layer after layer, until the structure reaches its required size. TRC can also be created by Pultrusion. In this process, a textile is pushed through a slurry infiltration chamber, where the textile is covered and embedded with concrete. Rollers squeeze the concrete into the textile, and it can take several sized rollers to get the desired shape and size.

== Uses ==
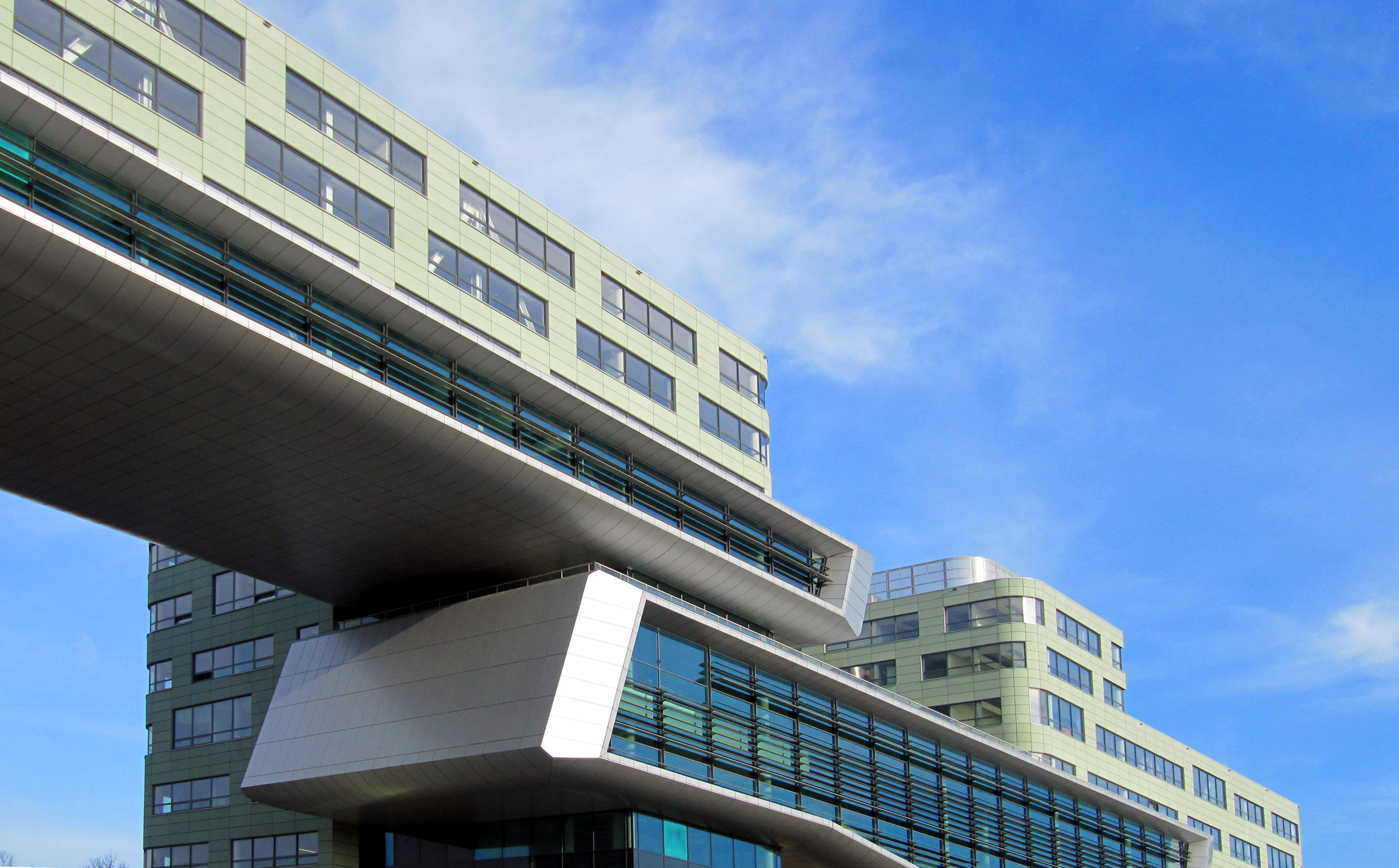
A building made of textile-reinforced concrete

Uses of textile reinforced materials, concretes are extensively increasing in modern days in combination with materials science and textile technology. Bridges, Pillars and Road Guards are prepared by kevlar or jute reinforced concretes to withstand vibrations, sudden jerks and torsion (mechanics). The use of reinforced concrete construction in the modern world stems from the extensive availability of its ingredients – reinforcing steel as well as concrete. Reinforced concrete fits nearly into every form, is extremely versatile and is therefore widely used in the construction of buildings, bridges, etc. The major disadvantage of RC is that its steel reinforcement is prone to corrosion. Concrete is highly alkaline and forms a passive layer on steel, protecting it against corrosion. Substances penetrating the concrete from outside (carbonation) lowers the alkalinity over time (depassivation), making the steel reinforcement lose its protection thus resulting in corrosion. This leads to spalling of the concrete, reducing the permanency of the structure as a whole and leading to structural failure in extreme cases.

Due to the thin, cost effective, and lightweight nature of textile-reinforced concrete, it can be used to create many different types of structural components. The crack control of TRC is much better than that traditional steel-reinforced concrete; when TRC cracks, it creates multiple small fissures, between 50 and 100 nanometers wide. In some cases, the cracks can self-heal, since a 50 nanometer crack is almost as impermeable as a non-cracked concrete.

Textile-reinforced concrete can be used to create full structures, like bridges and buildings, as well as large structures in environments with much water, such as in mines and boat piers. As of 2018, the testing procedures and approval for these structures is not available, although it can currently be used to create small components, such as panels. Façade panels would be a convenient use of TRC, due to the material being thinner and lighter than typical concrete walls, and a cheaper alternative to other options. For bridges and building profiles, TRC could add to the strength and overall design of the structure. TRC could also be used to create irregular shapes with hard edges, and could be a novel way to enhance style and architectural design of modern buildings.

Textile-reinforced concrete could also be used to reinforce, repair, or add on to existing buildings, in either a structural or cosmetic basis. Furthermore, TRC could be used to provide a protective layer for old structures or retrofit new elements to an old structure, due to the lack of corrosion associated with this mechanism. Unlike steel, which will rust if a crack forms, TRC does not corrode and will retain its strength, even with small cracks. If carbon fiber fabric is used as the textile, TRC could be used to heat buildings; carbon fiber is conductive, and could be used to support the building, as well as heat it.

=== Current examples ===
Large scale textile-reinforced concrete can be seen in Germany, at RWTH Aachen University, where a pavilion was constructed using a textile-reinforced concrete roof. The roof was engineered using four TRC pieces; each piece was thin and double curved in the shape of a hyperbolic paraboloid. Traditional concrete design would not allow this structure, due to the complex form-work needed to create the piece. RWTH Aachen University also utilized textile-reinforced concrete to create façade panels on a new extension added to their Institute of Structural Concrete building. This façade was made using AR glass and was made much lighter weight and in a more cost effective manner than a traditional façade of steel-reinforced concrete or stone. In 2010, RWTH Aachen University also helped to design a textile-reinforced concrete bridge in Albstadt, Germany, using AR glass as the reinforcement; the bridge is approximately 100 meters long, and is expected to have a much longer service life than the steel reinforced concrete bridge it replaced.

== Sustainability ==
Textile-reinforced concrete is generally thinner than traditional steel-reinforced concrete. Typical steel-reinforced construction is 100 to 300 mm thick, while a TRC structure is generally 50 mm thick. TRC is much thinner due to an extra protective layer of concrete that is not needed for its design. Due to this thinner structure, less material is used, which helps to reduce the price of using concrete, since the amount of concrete needed is also reduced. Since TRC can be used to extend the life of existing structures, it cuts down on the cost of materials and man power needed to tear down these existing structures, in order to create new ones. Instead of replacing old structures, they can now be repaired to add years of service to the lives of their construction.

== See also ==
- Geotextiles
- Fiber-reinforced concrete
