= Barmen lace machine =

Machine for making torchon and bobbin-type laces and braids

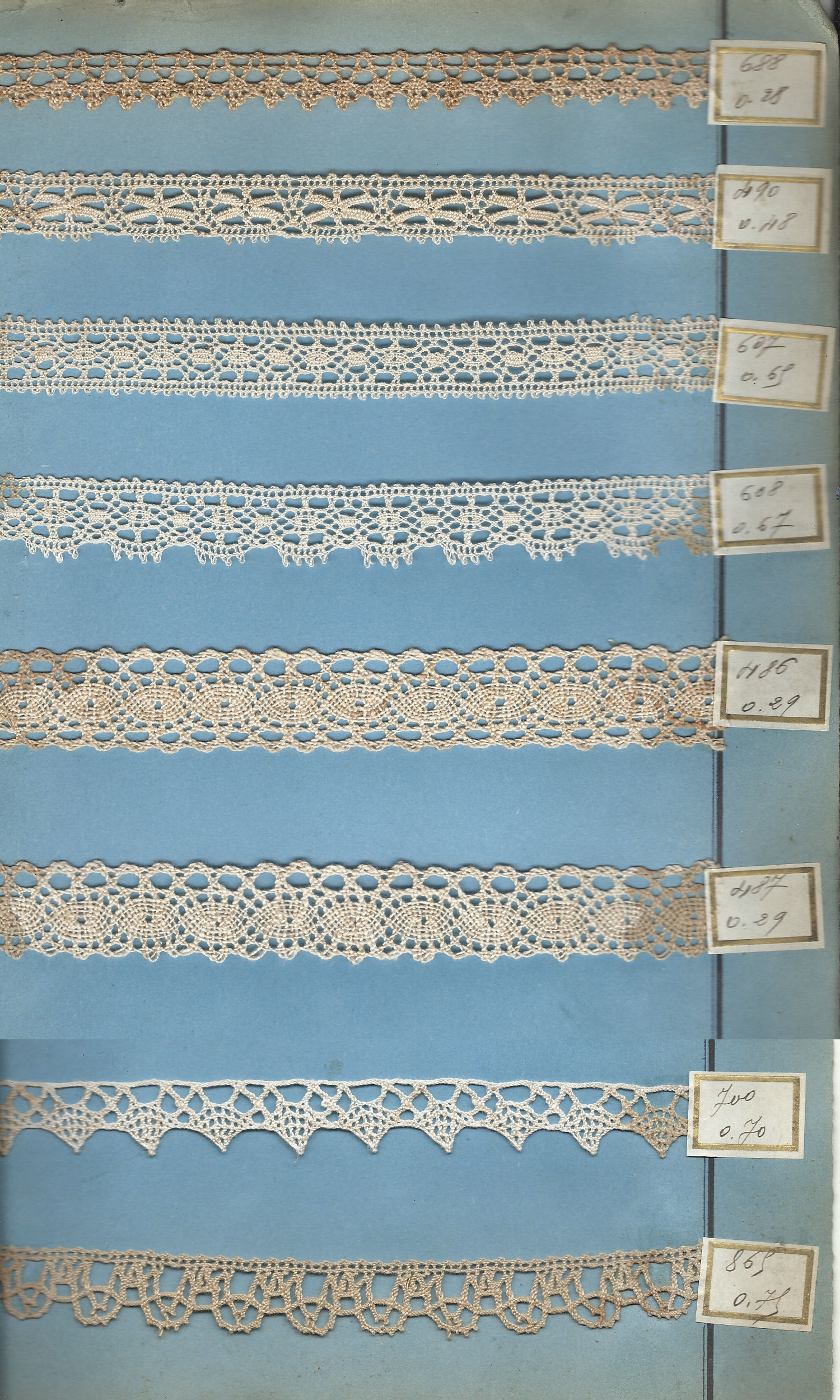
Barmen machine lace

The Barmen lace machine makes perfect copies of torchon lace and the simpler hand-made bobbin lace. Its bobbins imitate the movements of the bobbins of the hand-made lace maker.

== History ==
The Barmen machine was developed in the 1890s in the Prussian city of Barmen, now part of Wuppertal, Germany, from a braiding machine. The Barmen laces were derived from solid braids later pieced with openwork.

== Design of machine ==
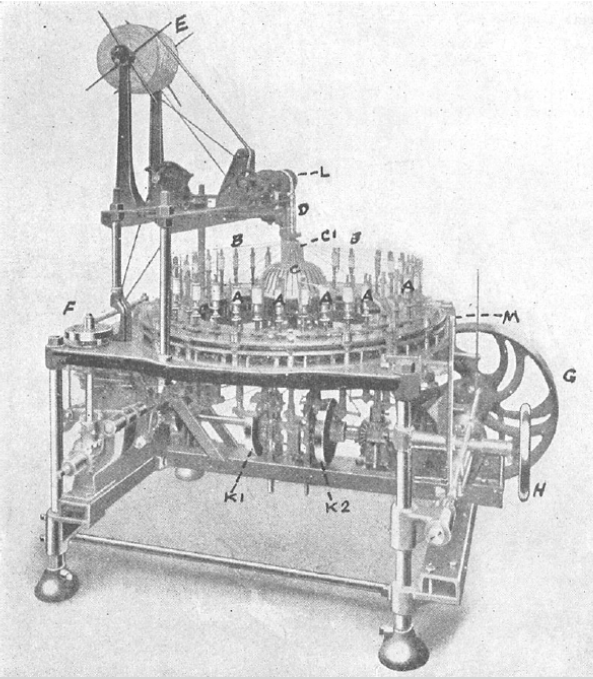
Barmen lace machine, showing its workings A. Spindle set in top plate B. Yarn threaded up to mandrill C.  Beater dome C1. Beater knives D.  Mandrill (variable settings) E.  Finished Lace F.  Jacquard G.  Pulley for drive belt H. Hand wheel K.  Beater cams L.  Take-up rolls M. Handle to engage drive belt

The Barmen machine has its spindles arranged in a circle, each one carrying a large bobbin of thread. These can pass each other, so their threads twine together in a complex way. The threads run towards the centre, where the finished lace appears, rising upwards. The machine can only make one width at a time, and has a maximum width of about 120 threads. The lace is made as a cylinder. When finished, threads are removed to allow the flat strip to appear.

== Uses ==
Barmen machines can make laces, trimmings, elasticated and rigid braids, cords and ric-racs. Barmen lace is still produced in Britain by Malmic Lace Limited, which is based in Nottingham.

== See also ==
- Lace machine
- Timeline of clothing and textiles technology
