= Timeline of clothing and textiles technology =

This timeline of clothing and textiles technology covers events relating to fiber and flexible woven material worn on the body. This includes the making, modification, usage, and knowledge of tools, machines, techniques, crafts, and manufacturing systems (technology).

== Fibers and fabrics ==
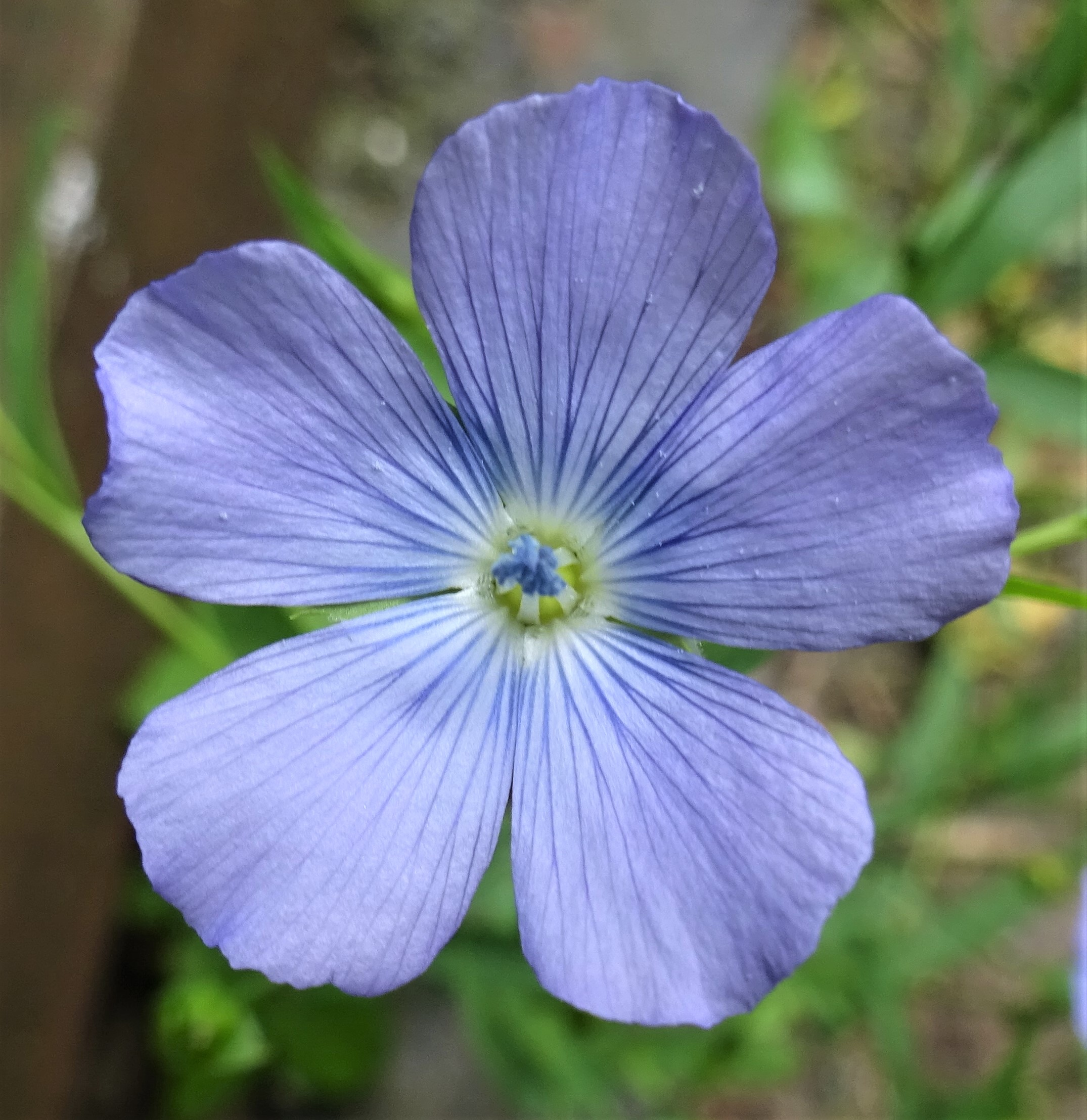
Flax flowers

- Research remains ongoing as to when people started wearing clothes.
- c. 50,000 BC – A discovered twisted fibre (a 3-ply cord fragment) indicates the likely use of clothing, bags, nets and similar technology by Neanderthals in southeastern France.
- c. 27000 BC – Impressions of textiles, basketry, and nets left on small pieces of hard clay in Europe.
- c. 25000 BC – Venus figurines depicted with clothing.
- c. 8000 BC – Evidence of flax cultivation in the Near East.
- c. 6000 BC – Evidence of woven textiles used to wrap the dead at Çatalhöyük in Anatolia.
- c. 3000 BC – Breeding of domesticated sheep with a wooly fleece rather than hair in the Near East.
- c. 2500 BC – The Indus Valley civilisation cultivates cotton in the Indian subcontinent.
- c. 1988 BC – Production of linen cloth in Ancient Egypt, along with other bast fibers including rush, reed, palm, and papyrus.
- c. 1000 BC – Cherchen Man was laid to rest with a twill tunic and the earliest known sample of tartan fabric.
- c. 200 AD – Earliest woodblock printing from China. Flowers in three colors on silk.
- 247 AD – Dura-Europos, a Roman outpost, is destroyed. Excavations of the city discovered early examples of naalebinding fabric.
- 11th century – Broadcloth first produced in the Duchy of Brabant (now Flanders).
- 1275 – Approximate date of a silk burial cushion knit in two colors found in the tomb of Spanish royalty.
- 1493 – The first available reference to lace is in a will by one of the ruling Milanese Sforza family.
- 1550-1600 – Armazine and Bombazine introduced for the first time in United Kingdom.
- 1590 – First reference to Cambric fabric.
- 1840 – Barathea developed as a cloth for mourning clothes.
- 1892 – Cross, Bevan & Beadle invent Viscose.
- 1938 – First commercial nylon fiber production by DuPont. Nylon is the first synthetic, non-cellulosic fiber on the market.
- 1938 – First commercial PTFE fiber production by DuPont.
- 1953 – First commercial polyester PET fiber production by DuPont.
- 1958 – Spandex fiber invented by DuPont's Joseph Shivers.
- 1964 – Kevlar fiber invented by DuPont's Stephanie Kwolek.

== Tools and machines ==
=== Ancient and prehistoric ===
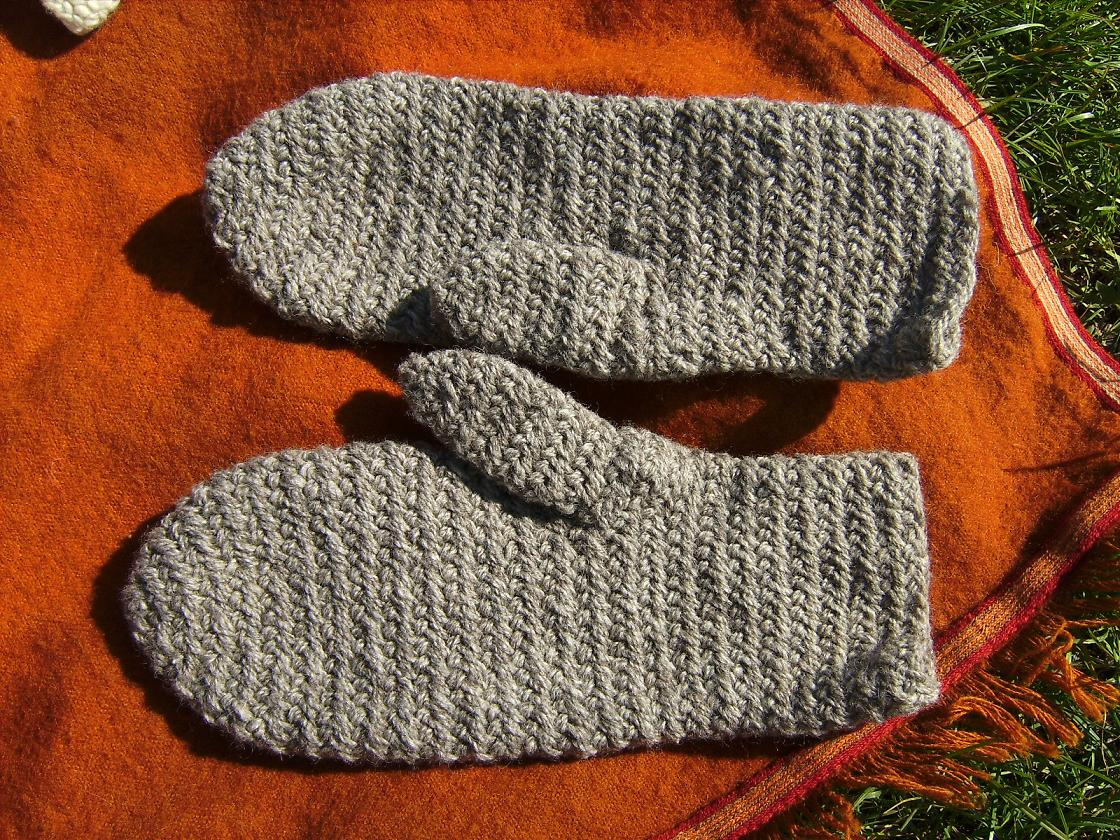
Mittens done in "nålebinding"

- c. 28000 BC – Sewing needles in use at Kostenki in Russia.
- c. 6500 BC – Approximate date of Naalebinding examples found in Nahal Hemar Cave, Israel. This technique, which uses short separate lengths of thread, predated the invention of knitting (with its continuous lengths of thread) and requires that all of the as-yet unused thread be pulled through the loop in the sewn material. This requires much greater skill than knitting in order to create a fine product.
- 4200 BC – Date of Mesolithic examples of Naalebinding found in Denmark, marking spread of technology to Northern Europe.
- 200 BC to 200 AD – Approximate date of earliest evidence of "Needle Knitting" in Peru, a form of Naalebinding that preceded local contact with the Spanish.
- 298 AD – Earliest attestation of a foot-powered loom, with a hint that the invention arose at Tarsus.

=== Medieval period ===
- 500s – Handheld roller cotton gins invented in the Indian subcontinent.
- 500-1000 – Spinning wheel invented in the Indian subcontinent.
- 1000s – Finely decorated examples of cotton socks made by true knitting using continuous thread appear in Egypt.
- 1000s – The earliest clear illustrations of the spinning wheel come from the Islamic world.
- 1100s-1300s – Dual-roller cotton gins appear in India and China.
- 1200s-1300s – The worm gear roller cotton gin invented in the Indian subcontinent during the early Delhi Sultanate era.
- 1400s-1500s – The incorporation of the crank handle in the cotton gin, first appeared in the Indian subcontinent some time during the late Delhi Sultanate or the early Mughal Empire.
- 1562 – Date of first example of use of the purl stitch, from a tomb in Toledo, Spain, which allows knitting of panels of material. Previously material had to be knitted in the round (in a tubular form) and cut open.
- 1589 – William Lee invents stocking frame, the first but hand-operated weft knitting machine.

=== Early modern period ===
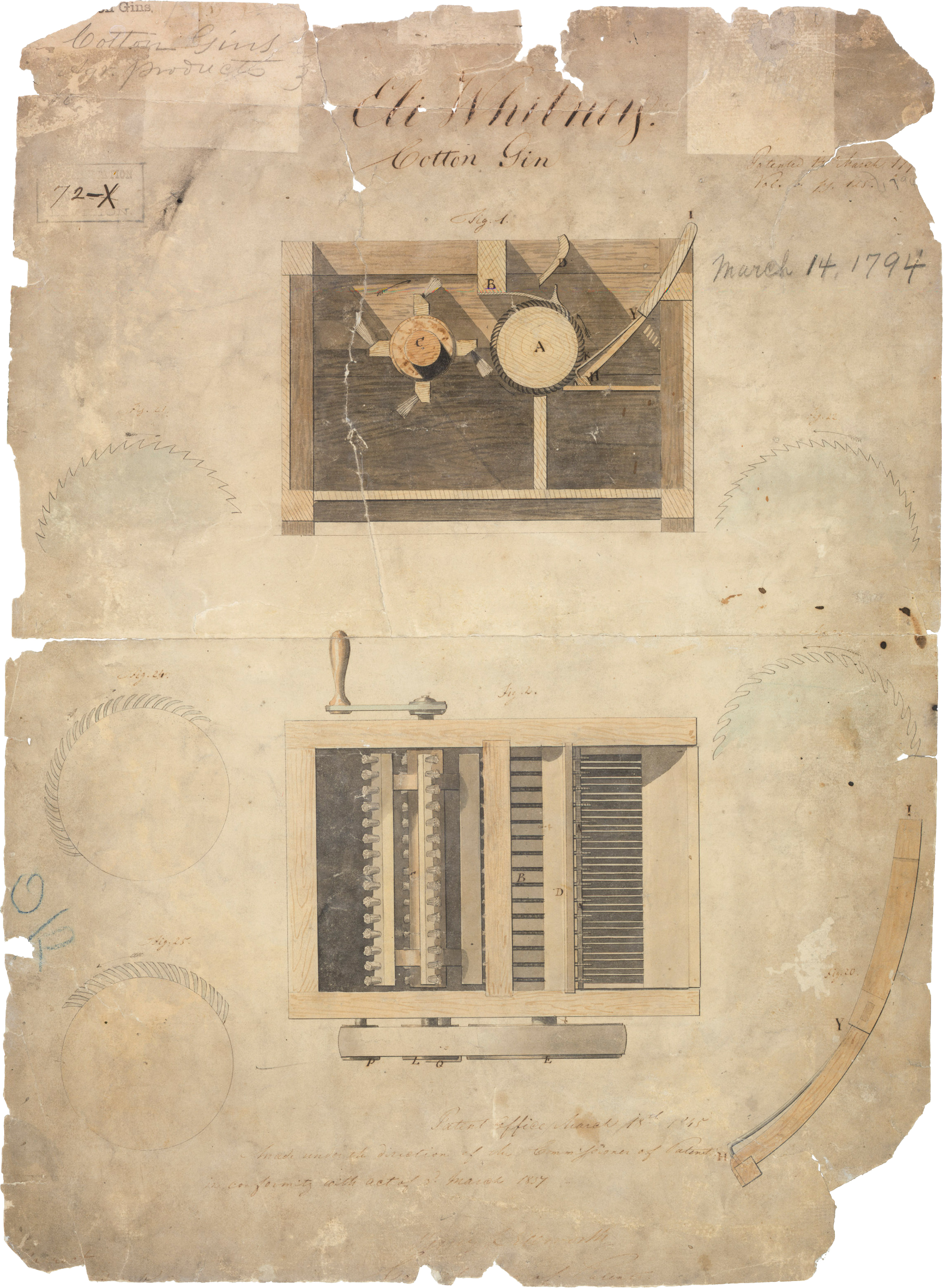
Eli Whitney's original cotton gin patent, dated March 14, 1794

- c. 1600 – The modern spinning wheel comes together with the addition of the treadle to the flyer wheel.
- 1725 – Basile Bouchon in Lyon invents punched paper data storage as a means for controlling a loom.
- 1733 – John Kay patents the flying shuttle.
- 1738 – Lewis Paul patents the draw roller.
- 1745 – Jacques Vaucanson in Lyon invents the first fully automated loom.
- 1758 – Jedediah Strutt adds a second set of needles to Lee's stocking frame to create the rib frame.
- 1764 – James Hargreaves or Thomas Highs invents the spinning jenny (patented 1770).
- 1767 – John Kay invents the spinning frame.
- 1768 – Josiah Crane invents the hand-operated warp knitting machine.
- 1769 – Richard Arkwright's water frame.
- 1769 – Samuel Wise solves the mechanization of W. Lee's stocking frame.
- 1779 – Samuel Crompton invents the spinning mule.
- 1784 – Edmund Cartwright invents the power loom.
- 1791 – The Englishman Dawson solves the mechanization of the warp knitting machine.
- 1793 – Samuel Slater of Belper establishes the first successful cotton spinning mill in the United States, at Pawtucket; beginnings of the Waltham-Lowell system
- 1794 – Eli Whitney patents the cotton gin.
- 1798 – The Frenchman Decroix (or Decroise) patents the circular bearded needle knitting machine.
- 1801 – Joseph Marie Jacquard invents the Jacquard punched card loom, which would later lead to the invention of the computer.
- 1806 – Pierre Jeandeau patents the first latch needle (for the knitting machine).
- 1808 – John Heathcoat patents the bobbin net machine.
- 1812 – Samual Clark and James Mart constructs the pusher machine.
- 1813 – William Horrocks improves the power loom.
- 1814 – Paul Moody of the Boston Manufacturing Company builds the first power loom in the United States; beginnings of the "Waltham System".
- 1823 – Associates of the late Francis Cabot Lowell of the Boston Manufacturing Company begin operations at the Merrimack Manufacturing Company at East Chelmsford, Massachusetts. In 1826, East Chelmsford becomes incorporated as the town of Lowell, Massachusetts, the first factory city in the United States.
- 1828 – Paul Moody develops the leather belt and pulley power transmission system, which would become the standard for U.S. mills.

=== Late modern period ===
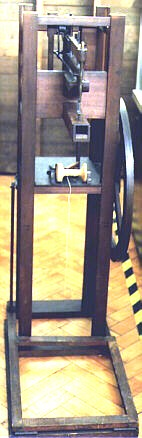
A copy of Barthélemy Thimonnier's sewing machine from about 1830

- 1830 – Barthélemy Thimonnier develops the first functional sewing machine.
- 1833 – Walter Hunt invents the lockstitch sewing machine, but is dissatisfied with its function and does not patent it.
- 1842 – Lancashire Loom, a semi-automatic power loom, is developed by Bullough and Kenworthy.
- 1842 – John Greenough patents the first sewing machine in the United States.
- 1844 – John Smith of Salford granted a patent for a shuttleless rapier loom.
- 1846 – John Livesey adapts John Heathcoat's bobbinet machine into the curtain machine
- 1847 – William Mason Patents his "Mason self-acting" Mule.
- 1849 – Matthew Townsend patents the variant of latch needle which has been the most widely used needle in weft knitting machines.
- 1855 – Redgate combines a circular loom with a warp knitting machine.
- 1856 – Thomas Jeacock of Leicester patents the tubular pipe compound needle.
- 1857 – Luke Barton introduces a self-acting narrowing mechanism on S. Wise's knitting machine.
- 1857 – Arthur Paget patents a multi-head knitting machine called "Paget-machine".
- 1859 – Wilhelm Barfuss improves on Redgates machine, called Raschel machines (named after the French actress Élisabeth Félice Rachel).
- 1864 – William Cotton patents the straight bar knitting machine named after him ("Cotton machine").
- 1865 – The American Isaac Wixom Lamb patents the flat knitting machine using latch needles.
- 1865 – Clay invents the double-headed latch needle which has enabled to create purl stitch knitting.
- 1866 – The American Mac Nary patents the circular knitting machine (with vertical needles) for fabrication of socks and stockings with heel and toe pouches.
- 1878 – Henry Griswold adds a second set of needles (horizontal needles) to the circular knitting machine enabling knitting of rib fabrics as cuff for socks.
- 1881 – Pierre Durand invents the tubular pipe compound needle.
- 1890s – Development of the Barmen machine

=== Contemporary ===
- 1889 – Northrop Loom: Draper Corporation, First automatic bobbin changing weaving loom placed in production. Over 700,000 would be sold worldwide.
- 1900 – Heinrich Stoll creates the flat bed purl knitting machine.
- 1910 – Spiers invents the circular bed purl knitting machine.
- c. 1920 – Hattersley loom developed by George Hattersley and Sons.
- 1924 – Celanese Corporation produces the first acetate fiber.
- 1928 – International Bureau of Standardization of Man Made Fibers founded.
- 1939 – US passes Wool Products Labeling Act, requiring truthful labeling of wool products according to origin.
- 1940 – Spectrophotometer invented, with impact on commercial textile dye processes.
- 1942 – First patent for fabric singeing awarded in US.
- 1949 – Heinrich Mauersberger invents the sewing-knitting technique and his "Malimo" machine.
- 1955 – Research begins on multi-phase weft insertion. Successful examples will not exist until the 80s and late 90s.
- 1956 – Du Pont Introduces a process for spinning sheaf yarn, a precursor to air-jet spinning.
- c. 1960s. Existing machines become outfitted with computerized numeric control (CNC) systems, enabling more accurate and efficient actuation.
- 1960 – US passes Textile Fiber Products Identification Act, dealing with mandatory content disclosure in labelling, invoicing, and advertising of textile products.
- 1963 – Open-end spinning developed in Czechoslovakia.
- 1965 – Dunlop Rubber awarded patent for polyurethane sheets fused together using ultrasonic vibrations, a precursor to fusing of coated textiles.
- 1968 – Control device for the knives of a pleating machine patented in Germany.
- 1979 – Murata manufacturing demonstrates air splicing of yarn.
- c. 1981 – Air jet spinning enters the US market.
- 1983 – Bonas Machine Company Ltd. presents the first computer-controlled, electronic, Jacquard loom.
- 1988 – First US patent awarded for a "pick and place" robot.

== Treatments, dyes, and finishes ==
- 500 AD – jia xie method for resist dyeing (usually silk) using wood blocks invented in China. An upper and a lower block is made, with carved out compartments opening to the back, fitted with plugs. The cloth, usually folded a number of times, is inserted and clamped between the two blocks. By unplugging the different compartments and filling them with dyes of different colors, a multi-colored pattern can be printed over quite a large area of folded cloth.
- 600s – Oldest samples of cloth printed by woodblock printing from Egypt.
- 1799 – Charles Tennant discovers and patents bleaching powder.
- 1856 – William Henry Perkin invents the first synthetic dye.
- 1921 – Georges Heberlein, of Switzerland, patents a treatment of cellulose with sulfuric acid to create organdy.
- c. 1945-1970 – Antimicrobial research enters a "golden" period. By the 1980s, antimicrobial treatments for textiles are developed and implemented in manufacturing.
- 1954 – Fiber reactive dye invented, with better performance for dyeing cellulosic fiber
- 1961 – Du Pont assigned patent for yarn fasciation.
- 1967 – Dow Chemical Co patents method for treating textile materials with a fluorocarbon resin, offering water, oil, and stain repellency.
- 1970 – Superwash acid treatment of wool creates a more durable material that does not shrink in laundry.
- 1979 – US DoD's Natick Labs grants multi-millions of dollars for research in chemical and biological protection garments.

== See also ==
- Sewing
- Clothing technology
- Timeline of historic inventions
