= 3D composites =

Three-dimensional composites use fiber preforms constructed from yarns or tows arranged into complex three-dimensional structures. These can be created from a 3D weaving process, a 3D knitting process, a 3D braiding process, or a 3D lay of short fibers. A resin is applied to the 3D preform to create the composite material. Three-dimensional composites are used in highly engineered and highly technical applications in order to achieve complex mechanical properties. Three-dimensional composites are engineered to react to stresses and strains in ways that are not possible with traditional composite materials composed of single direction tows, or 2D woven composites, sandwich composites or stacked laminate materials.

== 3D Woven Composites ==
Three dimensional woven fabrics are fabrics that could be formed to near net shape with considerable thickness. There is no need for layering to create a part, because a single fabric provides the full three-dimensional reinforcement. The 3-D woven fabric is a variant of the 2D weaving process, and it is an extension of the very old technique of creating double and triple woven cloth. 3D weaving allows the production of fabrics up to 10 cm in thickness. Fibers placed in the thickness direction are called z-yarn, warp weaver, or binder yarn for 3D woven fabrics. More than one layer of fabric is woven at the same time, and z-yarn interlaces warp and woof yarns of different layers during the process. At the end of the weaving process, an integrated 3D woven structure, which has a considerable thickness, is produced. Three-dimensional woven structures can create composite materials with fiber volume fractions around 50% in both 3D unit cell and 3D orthogonal structures.

Angle-interlock three-dimensional woven structures are also common in order to create much thicker woven preforms. In the interlock structures yarns can be woven from one layer of yarns to another and then back to the original layer to lock adjacent layers to each other. In complex interlock structures yarns may be woven at specified points into several layers in order to join multiple layers. These structures have a great advantage over laminated materials because of their excellent resistance to layer delamination.

By using jacquard woven techniques such as bifurcation, the 3D woven preforms can be created into nearly endless shapes ranging from a standard I-Beam to a complex Sine-Curve I-Beam, to Aircraft Airfoils, and many other shapes. 3D woven composites, finished with resin transfer molding have been produced larger than 26 feet long.

3D woven composites are used for various engineering applications, including engine rotors, rocket nose cones and nozzles, engine mounts, aircraft framework, T- and X-shape panels, leading edges for aircraft wings, and I-Beams for civil infrastructure.

=== Classification of 3D woven fabrics ===
There are several types of 3D woven fabrics that are commercially available; they can be classified according to their weaving technique.

1. 3D woven interlock fabrics, are 3D woven fabrics produced on a traditional 2D weaving loom, using proper weave design and techniques, it could either have the weaver/z-yarn going through all the thickness of the fabric or from layer to layer.
2. 3D orthogonal woven fabrics, are 3D woven fabrics produced on a special 3D weaving loom. The process to form such fabric was patented by Mohamed and Zhang. The architecture of the 3D orthogonal woven fabric consists of three different sets of yarns; warp yarns (y-yarn), weft yarns (x-yarn), and (z-yarn). Z-yarn is placed in the through-thickness direction of the preform. In 3D orthogonal woven fabric there is no interlacing between warp and weft yarns and they are straight and perpendicular to each other. On the other hand, z-yarns combine the warp and the weft layers by interlacing (moving up and down) along the y-direction over the weft yarn. Interlacing occurs on the top and the bottom surface of the fabric.

=== Advantages ===
- 3D woven fabrics are very useful in applications where the composite structure is subjected to out-of-plane loading, thanks to the extra strength provided by the z-yarn in the through thickness dimension. Thus it can better resist delamination, which is the separation of layers due to out-of-plane forces.
- 3D woven fabrics have a high formability, which means they can easily take the shape of the mold in case of complex composite designs.
- 3D woven fabrics have a highly porous structure, which decreases resin infusion time.
- 3D orthogonal woven fabrics have less or no yarn crimp (the difference in length of yarn, before and after weaving); therefore, mechanical properties of fibers are almost fully used in warp and weft directions. Thus, it could benefit from the maximum load carrying capacity of high performance fibers in these directions.
- The shape of 3D woven fabrics can be tapered in all three directions during the weaving process, producing near net shape fabrics such as I-beams and stiffeners. This means that these preforms could be placed directly in the mold without any additional labor work.
- There is no need for layering to create a part, because the single fabric has a considerable thickness that provides the full three-dimensional reinforcement.
- The 3D woven fabric can be molded into different shapes and can be used in biological applications to create replacement tissues

== 3D Braided Composites ==
"3D braided fabrics technology is an extension of the well-established 2-D braiding technology wherein the fabric is constructed by the intertwining of two or more yarn systems to form an integral structure." Developed in the late 1960s, in an effort to circumvent the problems related to 2D composite laminates yet at the same time retain the benefits of the braiding process. Braided structures, used as composite preforms, have a number of advantages over other competing processes, such as filament winding and weaving.

Braided composites have superior toughness and fatigue strength in comparison to filament wound composites. Woven fabrics have orthogonal interlacement while the braids can be constructed over a wide range of angles, from 10 to 858. An additional set of axial yarns can be introduced to the braiding process to produce triaxial braids (Fig. 1); triaxial braids are more stable and exhibit nearly isotropic properties.

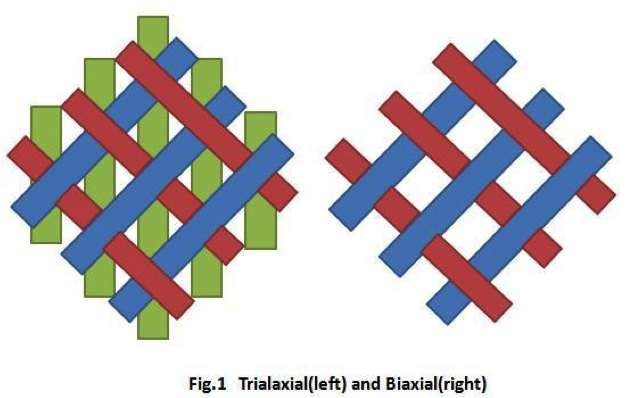
for 3d composites article

Braids can be produced either as seamless tubes or flat fabrics with a continuous selvedge. Composites produced with the braided preforms exhibit superior strength and crack resistance in comparison to broadcloth composites, due to fiber continuity; Composites with braided holes (Fig.2) exhibit about 1.8 times the strength in comparison to drilled holes, again due to fiber continuity.

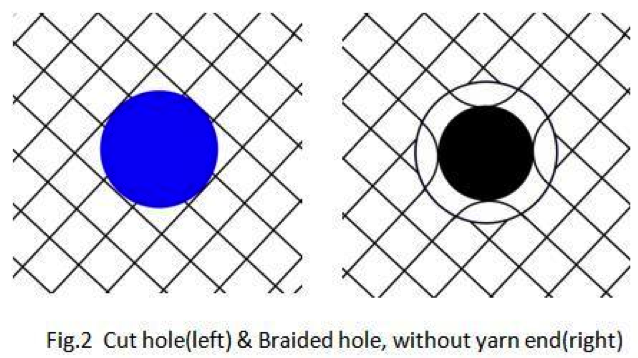
for 3d composites article

There are two main types of 3D braiders, horn gear and track and column types. Horn gear type 3D braiders use a large number of traditional horn gears for carrier propulsion. By arranging the horn gears in a square, 3D solid braids with a variety of cross-sections (e.g. H section) can be produced.

Applications of 3D Braided Composites

- Propeller blades, propulsion shafts, propellers
- Truss section decking, landing pads
- Auto bodies, chassis, drive shafts
- Biomedical devices

== 3D Stitched Composites ==
The stitching of laminates in the through thickness direction with a high strength thread has proven a simple, low-cost method for producing 3-D composites. The stitching process basically involves sewing high tensile strength yarn (e.g. glass, carbon or Kevlar), through an uncured prepreg laminate or dry fabric plies using an industrial sewing machine.

Studies report an improvement to in-plane mechanical properties due to stitching, whereas others find unchanged or degraded properties.The data assembled for stitched laminates reveal that the tension, compression, flexure, shear and open-hole strengths are improved or degraded up to 20% by stitching relative to those of unstitched laminates.

Applications of 3D Stitched Composites

- Lap joints
- Stiffened panels
- Aircraft wing-to-spar joints

== 3D Z-Pinning ==
This alternative method to the standard stitching process was first introduced in the late 1980s and was commercially developed by the company Aztex as Z-Fiber technology. "This technology consists of embedding previously cured reinforcement fibers into a thermoplastic foam that is then placed on top of a prepreg, or dry fabric, lay-up and vacuum bagged." 12 The foam will collapse as temperature and pressure are increased, which allows the fibers to be slowly pushed into the lay-up. 3D reinforcement in regards to Z-pinning is necessary to introduce a mechanical link between the different plies of the composite lamina, this link being a stiff carbon fiber rod in Z-pinning. Z-pin (carbon fiber of small diameter embedded in the thickness direction-z) composites are a means to provide higher through-the-thickness stiffness and strength that 2D woven composites do not possess.

Application of 3D Z-Pinned Composites

- Reinforcement of inlet duct skin panels and fastening hat-shaped stiffeners on the F/A- 18 Super Hornet fighter aircraft.

== Resin Application to Three-Dimensional Preforms ==
Many Three-Dimensional preforms are transformed into complex composite materials when a resin is applied and cured within the preform to create a solid fiber reinforced matrix. The most common form of resin application for 3D preforms is the Resin Transfer Molding process where a mold is created in the shape of a preform and the preform is then placed inside. The mold is closed and then the resin of the matrix material is injected under particular temperature and pressure, then allowed to cure. the mold is then removed from the exterior of the 3D composite material.

== Mechanical Evaluation of 3D Composites vs. 2D Composites ==
The microstructure of a 3D woven composite is mainly determined by the fiber architecture to the woven preform and weaving process, and to a lesser extent by the process of consolidation.Various types of defects are inadvertently created during the 3D weaving process that can possibly degrade the in-plane, through-thickness, and impact properties of the 3D composite. Research has found that testing various 3D composite materials that " ...the strength is the same or slightly higher than an equivalent two-dimensional (2D) material." When compared to a 2D composite, the impact resistance, compression after impact (CAI), and delamination control is significantly improved with a 3D composite without significantly reducing the mechanical properties along the plane.

== See also ==
- 3D textiles
