= Buckstitching =

Buckstitching is a technique used in leathercraft for securely joining two or more pieces of heavy leather along a seam. It is a simple, durable technique. Buckstitching is performed using a pronged metal tool that leatherworkers call a "buckstitch chisel" that has between one and five (or more) cutting tips. The chisel is held over the leather pieces to be joined, and is then struck with a mallet until the chisel penetrates all of the leather and produces what are called lacing slits. This is repeated along the entire seam. Next, a special leatherworker's needle is used to thread a wide sturdy lace back and forth through all of the slits.

Buckstitching is often found on items such as cowboy boots, western saddles, and other leather products associated with the American frontier. It is an alternative to the whipstitch, the running stitch, the saddle stitch, the round braid, loop lacing, and appliqué lacing.
