= Spinning mule =

Machine used to spin cotton and other fibres

A working mule spinning machine at Quarry Bank Mill

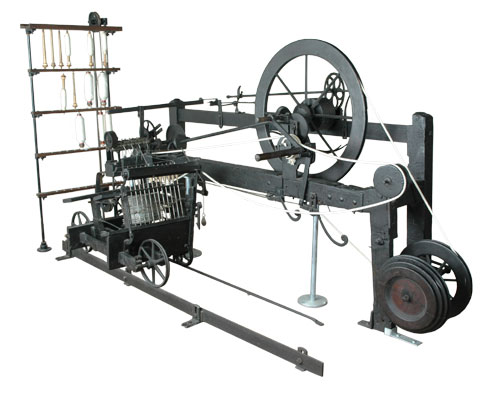
The only surviving example of a spinning mule built by the inventor Samuel Crompton

The spinning mule is a machine used to spin cotton and other fibres like wool. They were used extensively from the late 18th to the early 20th century in the mills of Lancashire and elsewhere. Mules were worked in pairs by a minder, with the help of two boys: the little piecer and the big or side piecer. The carriage carried up to 1,320 spindles and could be 150 feet (46 m) long, and would move forward and back a distance of 5 feet (1.5 m) four times a minute.

It was invented between 1775 and 1779 by Samuel Crompton. The self-acting (automatic) mule was patented by Richard Roberts in 1825. At its peak, there were 5,000,000 mule spindles in Lancashire alone. Modern versions are still in production and are used to spin woollen yarns from noble fibres such as cashmere, ultra-fine merino and alpaca for the knitted textile market.

The spinning mule spins textile fibres into yarn by an intermittent process. In the draw stroke, the roving is pulled through rollers and twisted; on the return it is wrapped onto the spindle. Its rival, the throstle frame or ring frame, uses a continuous process, where the roving is drawn, twisted and wrapped in one action. The mule was the most common spinning machine from 1790 until about 1900 and was still used for fine yarns until the early 1980s. In 1890, a typical cotton mill would have over 60 mules, each with 1,320 spindles, which would operate four times a minute for 56 hours a week.

== History ==
Before the 1770s, textile production was a cottage industry using flax and wool. Weaving was a family activity. The children and women would card the fibre – break up and clean the disorganised fluff into long bundles. The women would then spin these rough rovings into yarn wound onto a spindle. The male weaver would use a frame loom to weave this into cloth. This was then tentered in the sun to bleach it. The invention by John Kay of the flying shuttle made the loom twice as productive, causing the demand for cotton yarn to vastly exceed what traditional spinners could supply.

There were two types of spinning wheel: the simple wheel, which uses an intermittent process, and the more refined Saxony wheel, which drives a differential spindle and flyer with a heck (an apparatus that guides the thread to the reels) in a continuous process. These two wheels became the starting point of technological development. Businessmen such as Richard Arkwright employed inventors to find solutions that would increase the amount of yarn spun, then took out the relevant patents.

The spinning jenny allowed a group of eight spindles to be operated together. It mirrored the simple wheel; the rovings were clamped, and a frame moved forward stretching and thinning the roving. A wheel was rapidly turned as the frame was pushed back, and the spindles rotated, twisting the rovings into yarn and collecting it on the spindles. The spinning jenny was effective and could be operated by hand, but it produced weaker thread that could be used only for the weft part of the cloth. (Because the side-to-side weft does not have to be stretched on a loom in the way that the warp is, it can generally be less strong.)

The throstle and the later water frame pulled the rovings through a set of attenuating rollers. Spinning at differing speeds, these pulled the thread continuously while other parts twisted it as it wound onto the heavy spindles. This produced thread suitable for warp, but the multiple rollers required much more energy input and demanded that the device be driven by a water wheel. The early water frame, however, had only a single spindle. Combining ideas from these two system inspired the spinning mule.

The increased supply of muslin inspired developments in loom design such as Edmund Cartwright's power loom. Some spinners and handloom weavers opposed the perceived threat to their livelihood: there were frame-breaking riots and, in 1811–13, the Luddite riots. The preparatory and associated tasks allowed many children to be employed until this was regulated.

Development over the next century and a half led to an automatic mule and to finer and stronger yarn. The ring frame, originating in New England in the 1820s, was little used in Lancashire until the 1890s. It required more energy and could not produce the finest counts.

=== The first mule ===
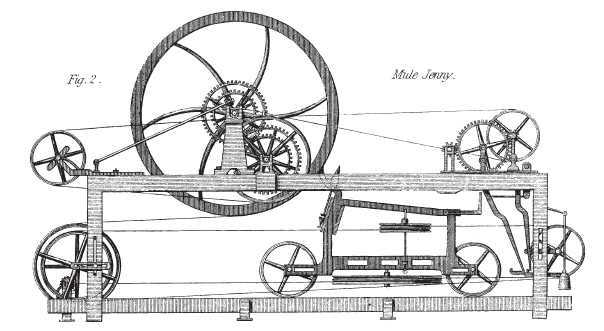
An early spinning mule: showing the gearing in the headstock

Samuel Crompton invented the spinning mule in 1779, so called because it is a hybrid of Arkwright's water frame and James Hargreaves's spinning jenny in the same way that a mule is the product of crossbreeding a female horse with a male donkey. The spinning mule has a fixed frame with a creel of cylindrical bobbins to hold the roving, connected through the headstock to a parallel carriage with the spindles. On the outward motion, the rovings are paid out through attenuating rollers and twisted. On the return, the roving is clamped and the spindles are reversed to take up the newly spun thread.

Crompton built his mule from wood. Although he used Hargreaves' ideas of spinning multiple threads and of attenuating the roving with rollers, it was he who put the spindles on the carriage and fixed a creel of roving bobbins on the frame. Both the rollers and the outward motion of the carriage remove irregularities from the rove before it is wound on the spindle. When Arkwright's patents expired, the mule was developed by several manufacturers. Crompton's first mule had 48 spindles and could produce 1 pound (0.45 kg) of 60s thread a day. This demanded a spindle speed of 1,700 rpm, and a power input of 1/16 horsepower (47 W).

The mule produced strong, thin yarn, suitable for any kind of textile, warp or weft. It was first used to spin cotton, then other fibres.

Samuel Crompton could not afford to patent his invention. He sold the rights to David Dale and returned to weaving. Dale patented the mule and profited from it.

=== Improvements ===
Crompton's machine was largely built of wood, using bands and pulleys for the driving motions. After his machine was public, he had little to do with its development. Henry Stones, a mechanic from Horwich, constructed a mule using toothed gearing and, importantly, metal rollers. Baker of Bury worked on drums, and Hargreaves used parallel scrolling to achieve smoother acceleration and deceleration.

In 1790, William Kelly of Glasgow used a new method to assist the draw stroke. First animals, and then water, was used as the prime mover. Wright of Manchester moved the headstock to the centre of the machine, allowing twice as many spindles; a squaring band was added to ensure the spindles came out in a straight line. He was in conversation with John Kennedy about the possibility of a self-acting mule. Kennedy, a partner in McConnell & Kennedy machine makers in Ancoats, was concerned with building ever larger mules. McConnell & Kennedy ventured into spinning when they were left with two unpaid-for mules; their firm prospered and eventually merged into the Fine Spinners & Doublers Association. In 1793, John Kennedy addressed the problem of fine counts. With these counts, the spindles on the return traverse needed to rotate faster than on the outward traverse. He attached gears and a clutch to implement this motion.

William Eaton, in 1818, improved the winding of the thread by using two faller wires and performing a backing off at the end of the outward traverse. All these mules had been worked by the strength of the operatives. The next improvement was a fully automatic mule.

=== Roberts' self-acting mule ===
Richard Roberts took out his first patent in 1825 and a second in 1830. The task he had set himself was to design a self-actor, a self-acting or automatic spinning mule. Roberts is also known for the Roberts Loom, which was widely adopted because of its reliability. The mule in 1820 still needed manual assistance to spin a consistent thread; a self-acting mule would need:

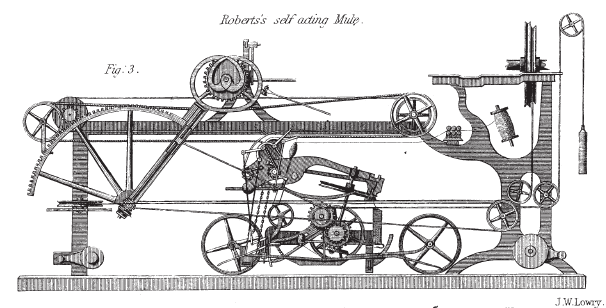
A Roberts self-acting spinning mule: 1835 diagram showing the gearing in the headstock

- A reversing mechanism that would unwind a spiral of yarn on the top of each spindle, before commencing the winding of a new stretch
- A faller wire that would ensure the yarn was wound into a predefined form such as a cop
- An appliance to vary the speed of revolution of the spindle, in accordance with the diameter of thread on that spindle

A counter faller under the thread was made to rise to take in the slack caused by backing off. This could be used with the top faller wire to guide the yarn to the correct place on the cop. These were controlled by levers and cams and an inclined plane called the shaper. The spindle speed was controlled by a drum and weighted ropes, as the headstock moved the ropes twisted the drum, which using a tooth wheel turned the spindles. None of this would have been possible using the technology of Crompton's time, fifty years earlier.

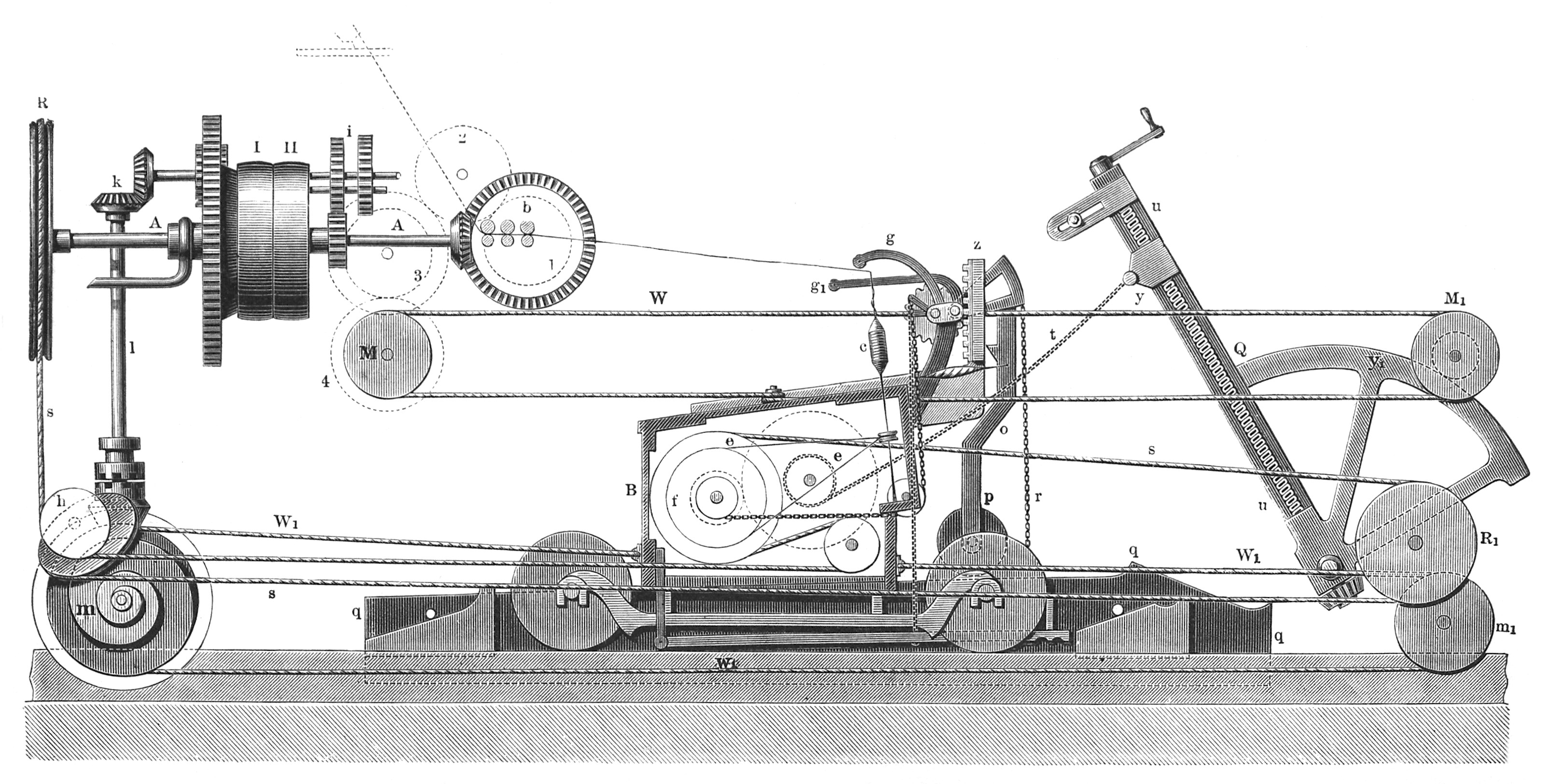
A cross section 1890

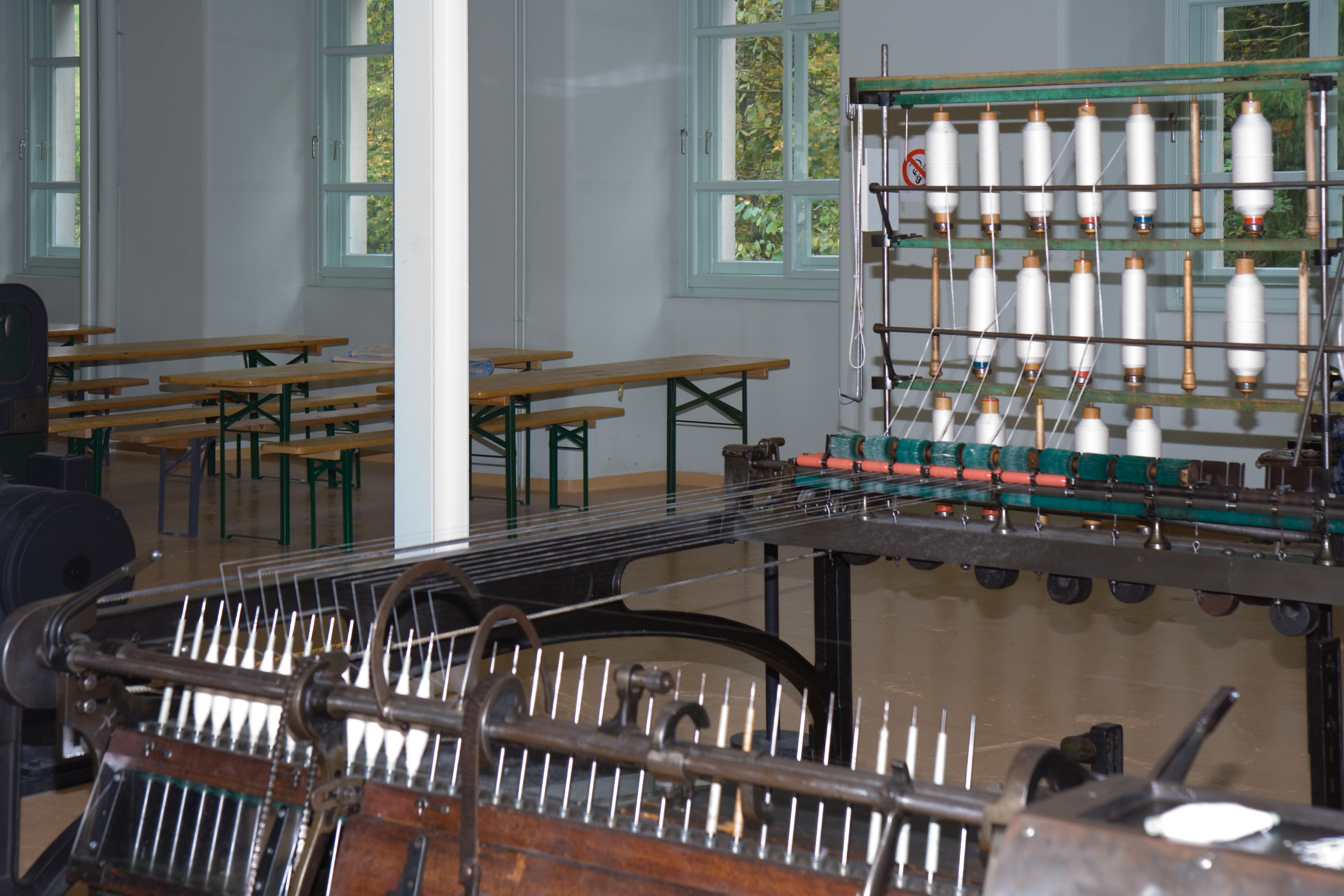
The outward traverse

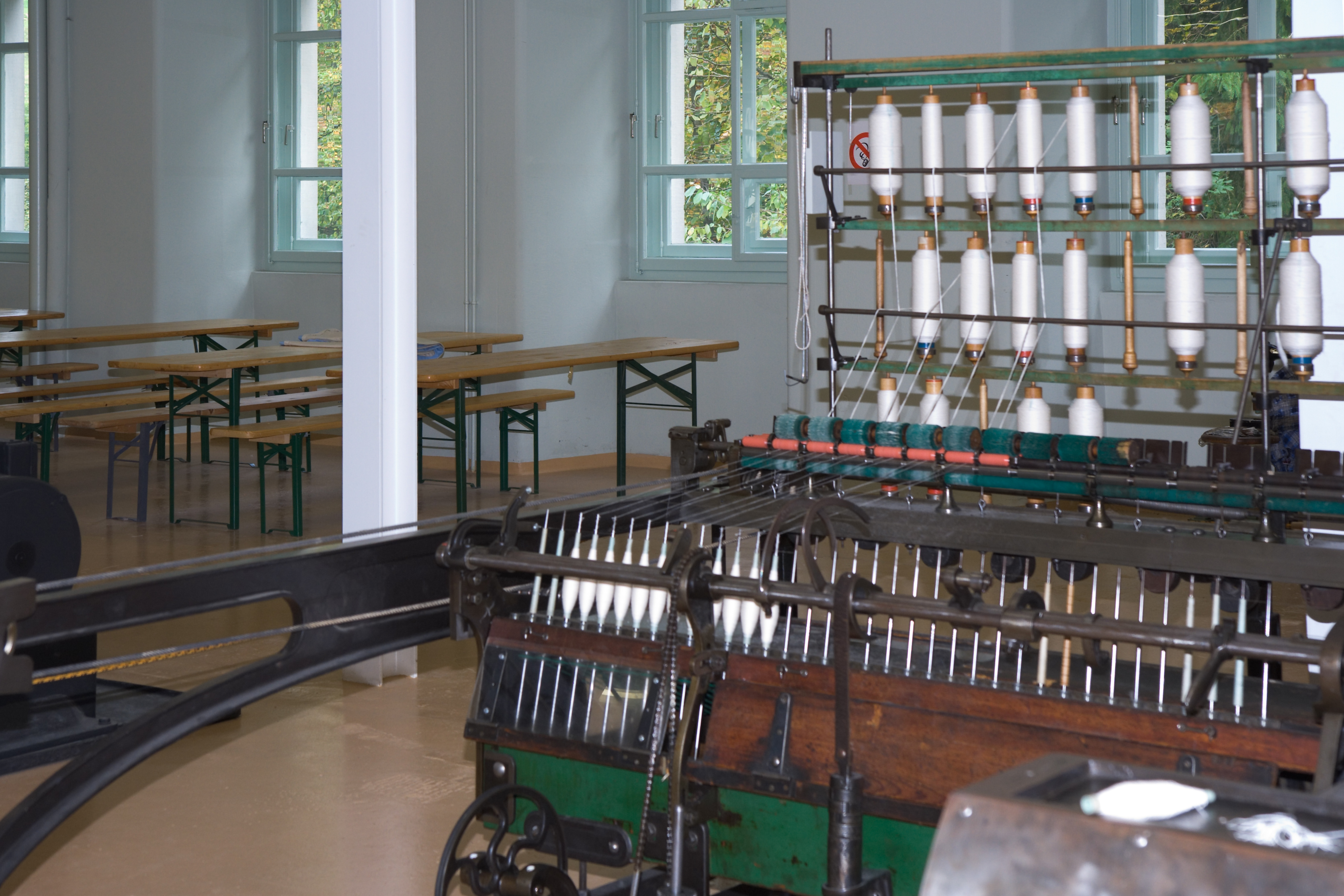
The inward traverse

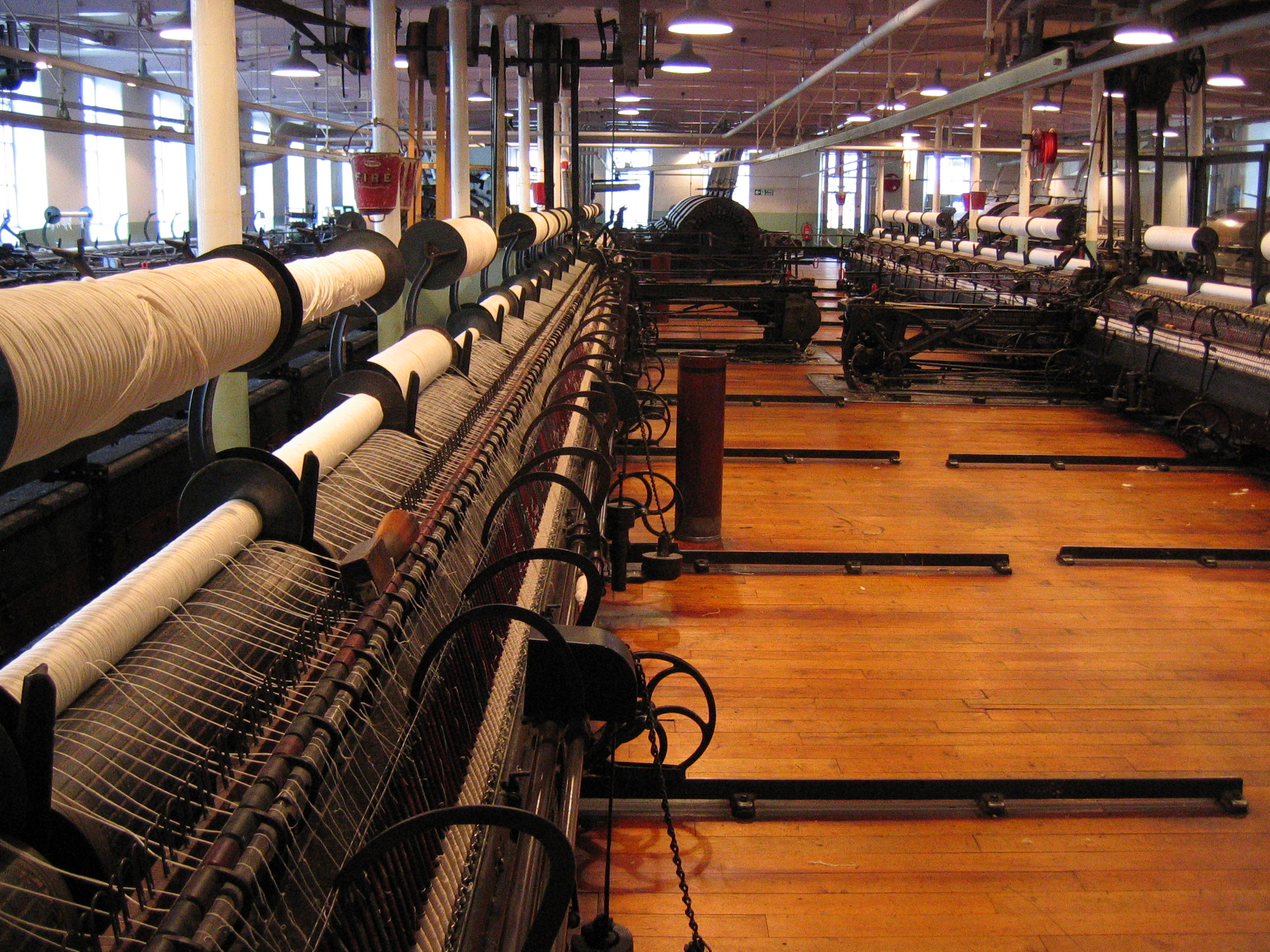
Notice the faller wire gear

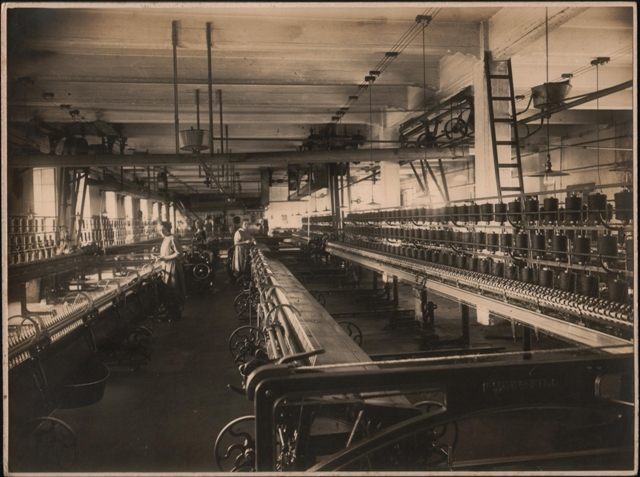
Selfactor in Vonwiller & Co., Senftenberg, Austria-Hungary (today Žamberk, Czech Republic)

With the invention of the self actor, the hand-operated mule was increasingly referred to as a mule-jenny.

=== Oldham counts ===
Oldham counts refers to the medium thickness cotton that was used for general purpose cloth. Roberts did not profit from his self-acting spinning mule, but on the expiry of the patent other firms took forward the development, and the mule was adapted for the counts it spun. Initially Roberts' self-actor was used for coarse counts (Oldham Counts), but the mule-jenny continued to be used for the very finest counts (Bolton counts) until the 1890s and beyond.

=== Bolton counts ===
Bolton specialised in fine count cotton, and its mules ran more slowly to put in the extra twist. The mule jenny allowed for this gentler action but in the 20th century additional mechanisms were added to make the motion more gentle, leading to mules that used two or even three driving speeds. Fine counts needed a softer action on the winding, and relied on manual adjustment to wind the chase or top of the perfect cop.

=== Woollen mules ===
Spinning wool is a different process as the variable lengths of the individual fibres means that they are unsuitable for attenuation by roller drafting. For this reason, woolen fibres are carded using condenser cards which rub the carded fibres together rather than drafting them. They are then spun on mule-type machines which have no roller drafting, but create the draft by the spindles receding from the delivery rollers whilst that latter, having paid out a short length of roving, are held stationary. Such mules are often complex involving multiple spindles speeds, receding motions, etc. to ensure optimum treatment of the yarn.

=== Condenser spinning ===
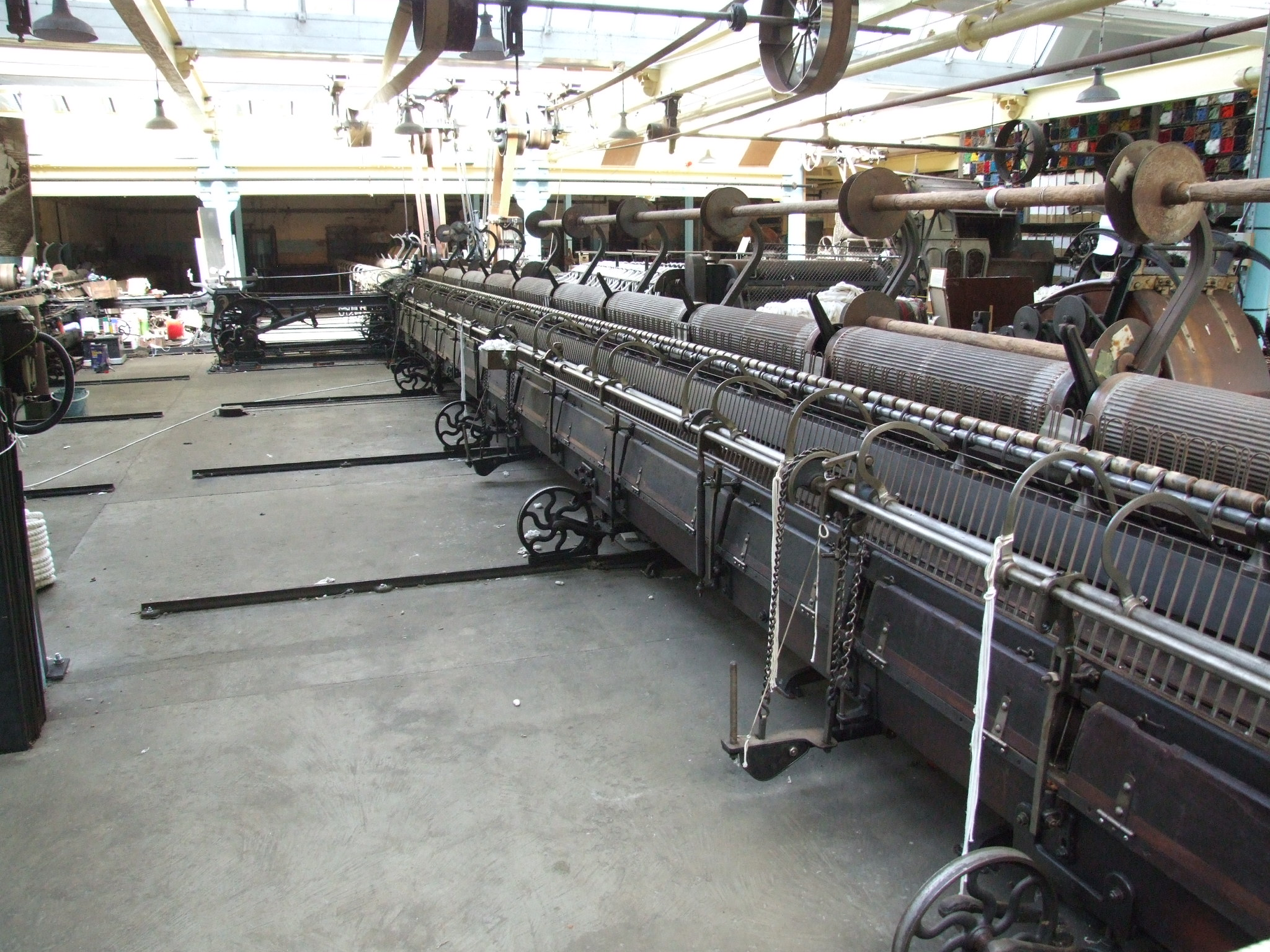
A pair of condenser spinning mules. These have 748 spindles and are believed to be the longest surviving cotton mules. They worked at Field Mill Ramsbottom, Lancashire until that mill closed in 1988 at which time they were the last such machines at work in the cotton industry probably in the world. These mules were built by Asa Lees and Company Ltd, of Oldham in 1906.

Condenser spinning was developed to enable the short fibres produced as waste from the combing of fine cottons, to be spun into a soft, coarse yarns suitable for sheeting, blankets etc. Only approximately 2% of the mule spindles in Lancashire were condenser spindles, but many more condenser mules survive today as these were the last spindles regularly at work., and the mules are similar. Helmshore Mills was a cotton waste mule spinning mill.

=== Current usage ===
Mules are still in use for spinning woolen and alpaca, and being produced across the world. In Italy for example by Bigagli and Cormatex.

== Operation of a mule ==
- Watch video demonstration #1

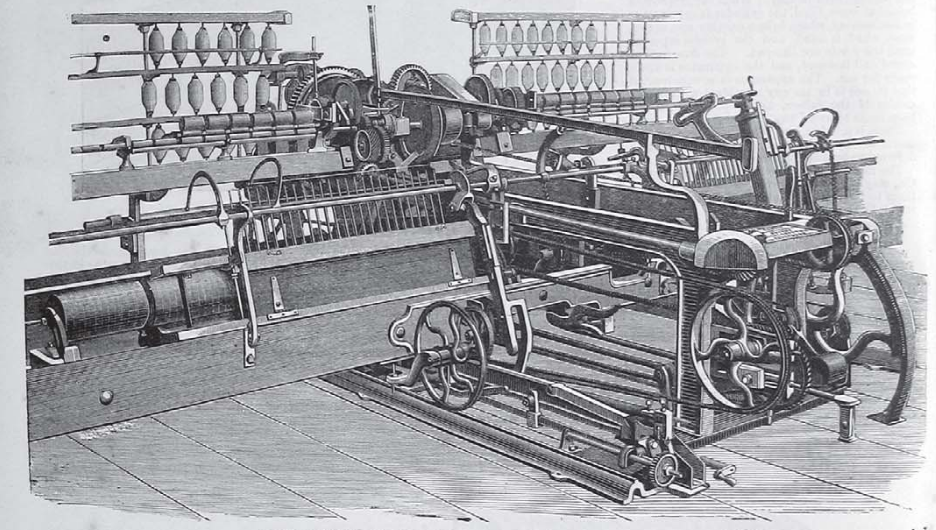
Taylor, Lang & Co selfactor mule headstock

Running spinning mule, built 1897, Mueller Cloth Mill

Mule spindles rest on a carriage that travels on a track a distance of 60 inches (1.5 m), while drawing out and spinning the yarn. On the return trip, known as putting up, as the carriage moves back to its original position, the newly spun yarn is wound onto the spindle in the form of a cone-shaped cop. As the mule spindle travels on its carriage, the roving which it spins is fed to it through rollers geared to revolve at different speeds to draw out the yarn.

Marsden in 1885 described the processes of setting up and operating a mule. Here is his description, edited slightly.

The creel holds bobbins containing rovings. The rovings are passed through small guide-wires, and between the three pairs of drawing-rollers.

- The first pair takes hold of the roving, to draw the roving or sliver from the bobbin, and deliver it to the next pair.
- The motion of the middle pair is slightly quicker than the first, but only sufficiently so to keep the roving uniformly tense
- The front pair, running much more quickly, draws out (attenuates) the roving so it is equal throughout.

Connection is then established between the attenuated rovings and the spindles. When the latter are bare, as in a new mule, the spindle-driving motion is put into gear, and the attendants wind upon each spindle a short length of yarn from a cop held in the hand. The drawing-roller motion is placed in gear, and the rollers soon present lengths of attenuated roving. These are attached to the threads on the spindles, by simply placing the threads in contact with the un-twisted roving. The different parts of the machine are next simultaneously started, when the whole works in harmony together.

The back rollers pull the sliver from the bobbins, and passing it to the succeeding pairs, whose differential speeds attenuate it to the required degree of fineness. As it is delivered in front, the spindles, revolving at a rate of 6,000–9,000 rpm twist the hitherto loose fibres together, thus forming a thread.

Whilst this is going on, the spindle carriage is being drawn away from the rollers, at a pace very slightly exceeding the rate at which the roving is coming forth. This is called the gain of the carriage, its purpose being to eliminate all irregularities in the fineness of the thread. Should a thick place in the roving come through the rollers, it would resist the efforts of the spindle to twist it; and, if passed in this condition, it would seriously deteriorate the quality of the yarn, and impede subsequent operations. As, however, the twist, spreading itself over the level thread, gives firmness to this portion, the thick and untwisted part yields to the draught of the spindle, and, as it approaches the tenuity of the remainder, it receives the twist it had hitherto refused to take. The carriage, which is borne upon wheels, continues its outward progress, until it reaches the extremity of its traverse, which is 63 inches (160 cm) from the roller beam. The revolution of the spindles cease, the drawing rollers stop.

Backing-off commences. This process is the unwinding of the several turns of the yarn, extending from the top of the cop in process of formation to the summit of the spindle. As this proceeds, the faller- wire, which is placed over and guides the threads upon the cop, is depressed; the counter-faller at the same time rising, the slack unwound from the spindles is taken up, and the threads are prevented from running into snarls. Backing-off is completed.

The carriage commences to run inwards; that is, towards the rollerbeam. This is called putting up. The spindles wind on the yarn at a uniform rate. The speed of revolution of the spindle must vary, as the faller is guiding the thread upon the larger or smaller diameter of the cone of the cop. Immediately the winding is finished, the depressed faller rises, the counter-faller is put down.

These movements are repeated until the cops on each spindle are perfectly formed: the set is completed. A stop-motion paralyses every action of the machine, rendering it necessary to doff or strip the spindles, and to commence anew.

Doffing is performed by the piercers thrutching, that is raising, the cops partially up the spindles, whilst the carriage is out. The minder then depressing the faller, so far as to guide the threads upon the bare spindle below. A few turns are wound onto the spindle, to fix the threads to the bare spindles for a new set. The cops are removed and collected into cans or baskets, and subsequently delivered to the warehouse. The remainder of the "draw" or "stretch," as the length of spun yarn is called when the carriage is out, is then wound upon the spindles as the carriage is run up to the roller beam. Work then commences anew. The doffing took only a few minutes, the piecers would run the length of the mule gate thrutching five spindles a time, and the doffing involved lifting four cops from the spindles with the right hand and piling them on the left forearm and hand. To get a firm cop bottom, the minder would whip the first few layers of yarn. After the first few draws the minder would stop the mule at the start of an inward run and take it in slowly depressing and releasing the faller wire several times. Alternatively, a starch paste could be skilfully applied to the first few layers of yarn by the piecers – and later a small paper tube was dropped over spindle – this slowed down the doffing operation and extra payment was negotiated by the minders.

=== Duties of the operatives ===
A pair of mules would be operated by a person called the minder and two boys called the side piecer and the little piecer. They worked barefoot in humid temperatures; the minder and the little piecer worked the minder half of the mule. The minder would make minor adjustments to his mules to the extent that each mule worked differently. They were specialists in spinning, and were answerable only to the gaffer and under-gaffer who were in charge of the floor and with it the quantity and quality of the yarn that was produced. Bobbins of rovings came from the carder in the blowing room delivered by a bobbin carrier who was part of the carder's staff, and yarn was hoisted down to the warehouse by the warehouseman's staff. Delineation of jobs was rigid and communication would be through the means of coloured slips of paper written on in indelible pencil.

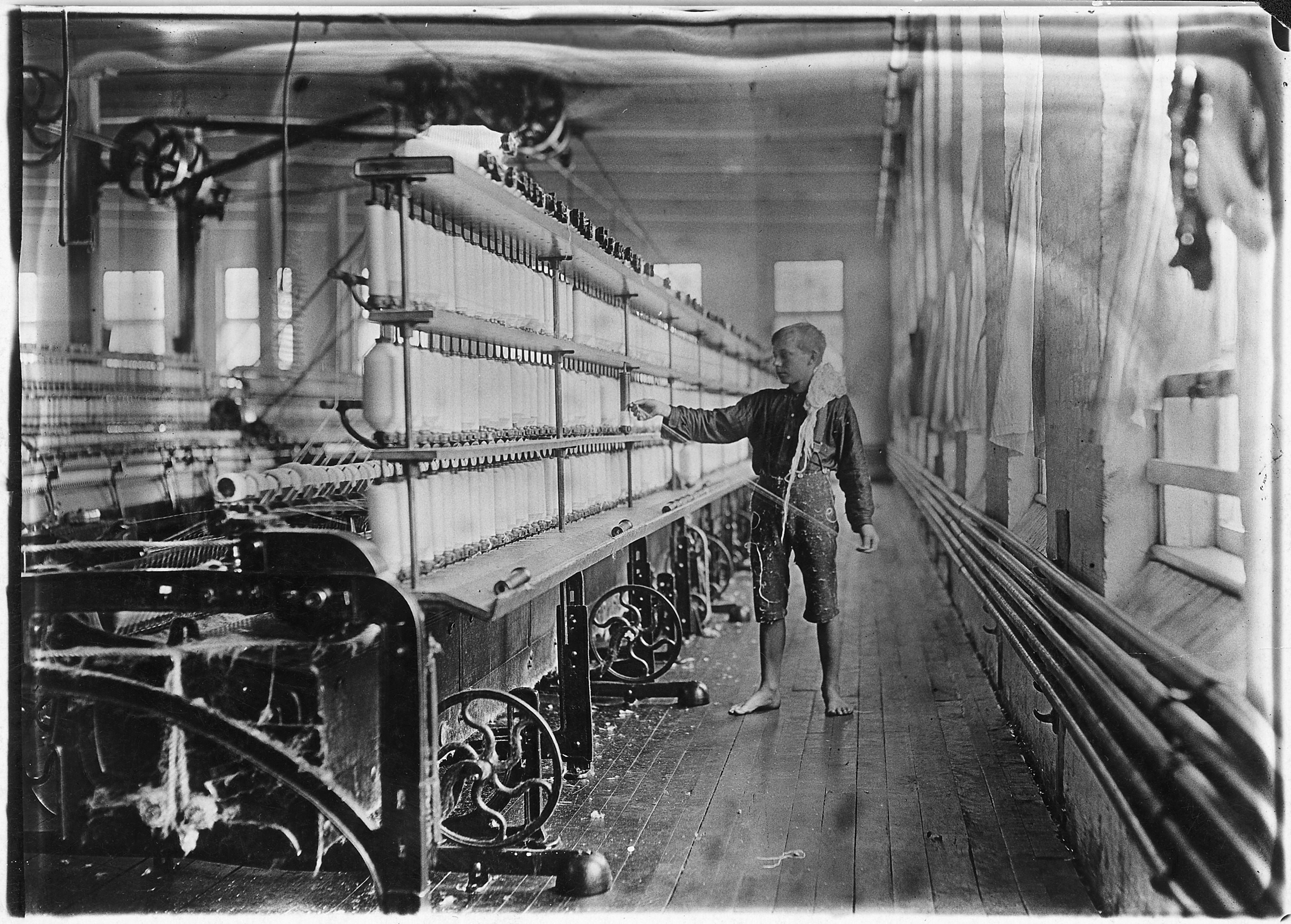
Mule-spinning room

Creeling involved replacing the rovings bobbins in a section of the mule without stopping the mule. On very coarse counts a bobbin lasted two days but on fine count it could last for 3 weeks. To creel, the creeler stood behind the mule, placing new bobbins on the shelf above the creel. As the bobbin ran empty he would pick it off its skewer in the creel unreeling 30 cm or so of roving, and drop it into a skip. With his left hand, he would place on the new bobbin onto the skewer from above and with his right hand twist in the new roving into the tail of the last.

Piecing involved repairing sporadic yarn breakages. At the rollers, the broken yarn would be caught on the underclearer (or fluker rod on Bolton mules), while at the spindle it would knot itself into a whorl on the spindle tip. If the break happened on the winding stroke the spindle might have to be stopped while the thread was found. The number of yarn breakages was dependent on the quality of the roving, and quality cotton led to fewer breakages. Typical 1,200 spindle mules of the 1920s would experience 5 to 6 breakages a minute. The two piecers would thus need to repair the thread within 15 to 20 seconds while the mule was in motion but once they had the thread it took under three seconds. The repair actually involved a slight rolling of the forefinger against the thumb.

Doffing has already been described.

Cleaning was important and until a formal ritual had been devised it was a dangerous operation. The vibration in a mule threw a lot of short fibres (or fly) into the air. It tended to accumulate on the carriage behind the spindles and in the region of the drafting rollers. Piking the stick meant placing the hand though the yarnsheet, and unclipping two sticks of underclearer rollers from beneath the drafting rollers, drawing them through the 1 1/4-inch (3.2 cm) gap between two ends, stripping them of fly and replacing them on the next inward run. Cleaning the carriage top was far more dangerous. The minder would stop the mule on the outward run, and raise his hands above his head. The piecers would enter under the yarn sheet with a scavenger cloth on the carriage spindle rail and a brush on the roller beam, and run bent double the entire length of the mule, avoiding the rails and draw bands, and not letting themselves touch the yarn sheet. When they had finished they would run to agreed positions of safety where the minder could see both of them, and the minder would unclip the stang and start the mule. Before this ritual was devised, boys had been crushed. The mule was 130 feet (40 m) long, the minder's eyesight might not have been good, the air in the mill was clouded with fly and another minder's boys might have been mistaken for his. The ritual became encoded in law.

=== Key components ===
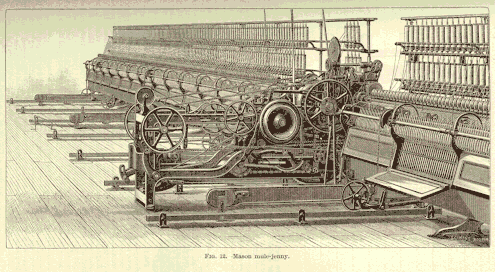
A mule jenny 1892

- Drawing rollers
- Faller and counter faller
- Quadrant

== Social and economic impact ==
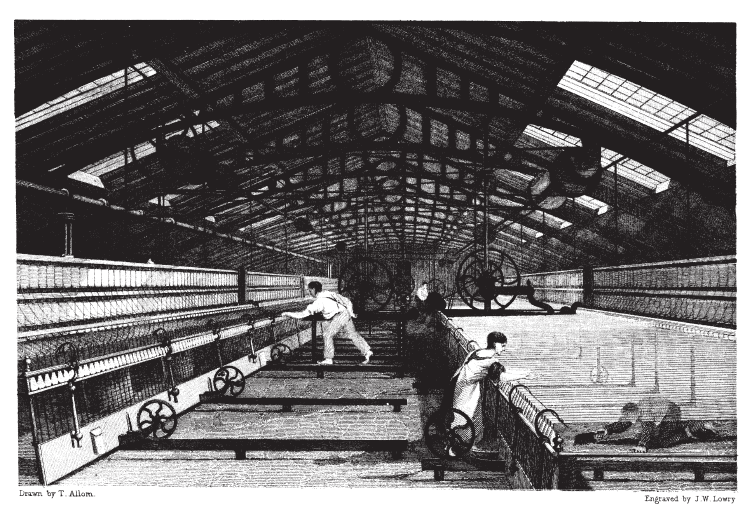
Mules operating in a cotton mill.

The spinning inventions were significant in enabling a great expansion to occur in the production of textiles, particularly cotton ones. Cotton and iron were leading sectors in the Industrial Revolution. Both industries underwent a great expansion at about the same time, which can be used to identify the start of the Industrial Revolution.

The 1790 mule was operated by brute force: the spinner drawing and pushing the frame while attending to each spindle. Home spinning was the occupation of women and girls, but the strength needed to operate a mule caused it to be the activity of men. Hand loom weaving, however, had been a man's occupation but in the mill it could and was done by girls and women. Spinners were the bare-foot aristocrats of the factory system. It replaced decentralised cottage industries with centralised factory jobs, driving economic upheaval and urbanisation.

Mule spinners were the leaders in unionism within the cotton industry; the pressure to develop the self-actor or self-acting mule was partly to open the trade to women. It was in 1870 that the first national union was formed.

The wool industry was divided into woollen and worsted. It lagged behind cotton in adopting new technology. Worsted tended to adopt Arkwright water frames which could be operated by young girls, and woollen adopted the mule.

== Mule-spinners' cancer ==
Circa 1900 there was a high incidence of scrotal cancer detected in former mule spinners. It was limited to cotton mule spinners and did not affect woollen or condenser mule spinners. The cause was attributed to the blend of vegetable and mineral oils used to lubricate the spindles. The spindles, when running, threw out a mist of oil at crotch height, that was captured by the clothing of anyone piecing an end. In the 1920s much attention was given to this problem. Mules had used this mixture since the 1880s, and cotton mules ran faster and hotter than the other mules, and needed more frequent oiling. The solution was to make it a statutory requirement to use only vegetable oil or white mineral oils, which were believed to be non-carcinogenic. By then cotton mules had been superseded by the ring frame and the industry was contracting, so it was never established whether these measures were effective.

== See also ==
- Cotton mill
- Textile manufacture during the Industrial Revolution
- Textile manufacturing
- Timeline of clothing and textiles technology

== Bibliography ==
- Catling, Harold (1986). The Spinning Mule. Preston: The Lancashire Library. ISBN 0-902228-61-7.
- Fowler, Alan (11–13 November 2004). "British Textile Workers in the Lancashire Cotton and Yorkshire Wool Industries". National Overview Great Britain, Textile Conference IISH.
- Nasmith, Joseph (1895). Recent Cotton Mill Construction and Engineering (Elibron Classics ed.). London: John Heywood. ISBN 1-4021-4558-6.
- Marsden, Richard (1884). Cotton Spinning: its development, principles an practice. George Bell and Sons 1903.
- Marsden, ed. (1909). Cotton Yearbook 1910. Manchester: Marsden and Co.
- Miller, I; Wild, C; Little, S (2007). A & G Murray and the Cotton Mills of Ancoats. Storey Institute Lancaster: Oxford Archaeology North. ISBN 978-0-904220-46-9.
- Saxonhouse, Gary; Wright, Gavin (2010). "Technological Evolution in Cotton Spinning, 1878–1933". The Japanese Economy in Retrospect. World Scientific. ISBN 9789814271455.
