= 3D braided fabrics =

Fabrics formed by inter-plaiting three orthogonal sets of yarn

3D braided fabrics are fabrics in which yarn runs through the braid in all three directions, formed by inter-plaiting three orthogonal sets of yarn. The fiber architecture of three-dimensional braided fabrics provides high strength, stiffness, and structural integrity, making them suitable for a wide array of applications. 3D fabrics can be produced via 3D weaving, knitting, and non-weaving processes.

== History ==
Three-dimensional braiding is among the oldest and most important of textile processes, transforming small natural fibers into more functional forms. Fabrics used in 3D braiding, such as rope, have been used since 4,000 BC.

In 1748, patents for the first 3D braiding machines were initiated in England. Most 3D braiding machines of the time were developed by modifying 2D braiding machines. In 1767, the first braiding machines which produced two-dimensional fabrics whose properties were different from 3D fabrics appeared in Germany. During the 1960s, the U.S. Government, as well as industrial and academic researchers, developed 3D braiding machines for use in producing composite material preforms, such as carbon fiber composites.

== Properties ==
3D braids show improved mechanical and structural properties. An important characteristic of 3D braids is their ability to form a variety of complex shapes; the direct manufacturing of complex structural shapes helps to eliminate the process of cutting to form joints, overlaps, and splices. 3D braided fabrics have high torsional stability and structural integrity.

== Manufacturing techniques ==
A track plate is kept at the bottom of the machine. Packages, which supply axial yarns, are kept beneath the track plate. Bobbins are mounted on the carrier, which is pushed by horn gears over the track plate. Braiding yarns are fed from these bobbins. The relative motion of the braiding yarns and the axial yarn determines the pattern and the structure of the braid. The 3D braiding process is a minor modification of the 2D braiding process, where the standing ends are added to the braiding yarns that are moving. The most important 3D braiding techniques are discussed below.

=== Circular braiding and over-braiding ===
In circular braiding, the bobbins (with opposite directions of rotation) move in two concentric orbits. The two orbits interfere to form dephased sinusoidal oscillations that determine the thread's pattern and crossing point. At this crossing point, the bobbins change their path to produce the upper and inner side of the braid. Generally, the circular braiding process produces braids with rotational symmetry. The over-braiding process follows the same principle as the circular braiding process, but the only modification is that the crossing point is located at the center.

=== Four-step braiding process ===
In this process, the bobbins move on the X and Y axes, which are mutually perpendicular to each other. In each step, the bobbins move to the neighboring crossing point in both axes and both directions, and stop for a specific interval of time. Basic arrangement of the braiding field is obtained after a minimum of four steps. This method produces braids which have a constant cross section.

=== Two-step braiding process ===
In the two-step braiding process, the bobbins move continuously without stopping. They move on the track plate through the complete structure and around the standing ends, such that the movements of bobbins are faster when compared to the four-step braiding process. The bobbins can move only in two directions, so the process is called the two-step braiding process.

=== 3D rotary braiding ===
The 3D rotary braiding process consists of base plates with horn gears and mobile bobbins arranged upon them. Switches are used to control the position of the threads and horn gears.

== Applications of 3D braided fabrics ==
3D braided fabrics have found applications in areas including medicine, aerospace, automobiles, train components, and reinforced hoses. The initial development of 3D braided fabrics came from the composite and medical industries. 3D braided fabrics can be manufactured in myriad varieties of cross-sections, and their near-net complex shapes make it possible to design very specialized products for both industries.

In helicopters, typical structural components like beams, sandwich structures, frames, and panels are manufactured using 3D braided profiles. Similarly, 3D fabrics are used to manufacture complex beam structures and floor panels in passenger cars. For train structures, different components manufactured from 3D braided profiles include the roof panel, interior components, side panels, and body structures.

=== In medicine ===
In the medical industry, 3D-braided fabrics find applications in stent grafts, bifurcated stents, arm and leg prosthetics, and braided sutures. Surgeons initially used two separate implant procedures for bifurcation stenosis treatment, which was time-consuming. With the advent of 3D braided fabric, multiple dendrite circular braids were produced for bifurcation stenosis treatment, which is flexible and less time-consuming. With multiple tubular braided structures, various cardiovascular implants can be produced.

=== In manufacturing of reinforced composite ===
Braiding is a unique technology for producing high-volume, low-cost composites. The 3D braided reinforced composites also exhibit high delamination resistance.

== See also ==
- 3D weaving
