= Malimo =

Textile manufacturing technique

Malimo is a textile manufacturing technique in which warp and weft yarns are sewn together. The method is also referred to as "stitch-bonding." It was invented in Eastern Germany in the 1950s. Malimo is used in a variety of applications, including apparel fabrics, wind turbine wings and isolation fabrics, and aerospace.

== Structure ==
Malimo is made by layering yarn in the warp and then layering weft over it, which is then held together with an additional yarn using interlocking. Malimo variations include multineedle operation, varying the number of yarns laid, and replacing warp with fabric. For instance the heavy number of warp and weft yarns sewn with fine yarn provides woven appearance. On the other hand, using fine yarns in the warp and weft and stitching with prominent yarns creates the appearance of knitted fabric. The fabric is three-dimensional in structure and is named after the Mali or arachne from which it is made.

== Heinrich Mauersberger ==
Heinrich Mauersberger, a German engineer, is credited with inventing Malimo, the series was further developed by the Chemnitz-based company Karl Mayer.

== See also ==
- Warp knitting
- 3D textiles
