= Rickrack =

Braided zigzag trim used in clothes or curtains

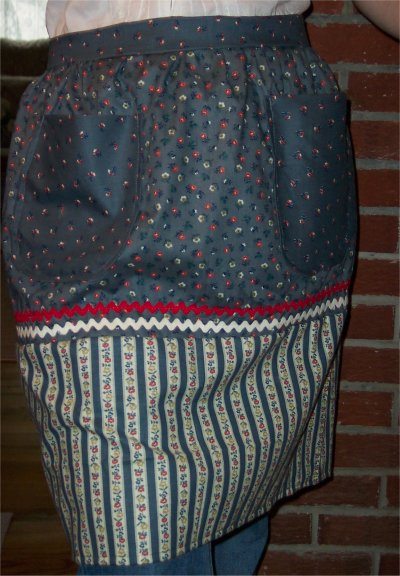
Red and cream rickrack trim on a calico half-apron

Rickrack (also ricrac and variants of both with a space or hyphen) is a flat piece of braided trim, shaped like a zigzag. It is used as a decorative element in clothes or curtains. Before the prevalence of sewing machines and overlockers, rickrack was used to provide a finished edge to fabric, and its popularity was in part due to its sturdiness and ability to stand up to harsh washing conditions. Rickrack is produced using a variety of fibers, including cotton, polyester, wool, and metallic fibers, and is sold in a variety of sizes and colors.

Invented in the mid-19th century, it took its modern form and current name around 1880. Rickrack's popularity peaked in the 1970s and is associated with the Little House on the Prairie. Several designs of formal and up-market girls' dresses with it on as a decoration became popular in the 1950s and 1960s.

Some modern sewing machine companies use the name "rickrack stitch" for a heavy decorative zigzag stitch, from its resemblance to the trim.

== History ==
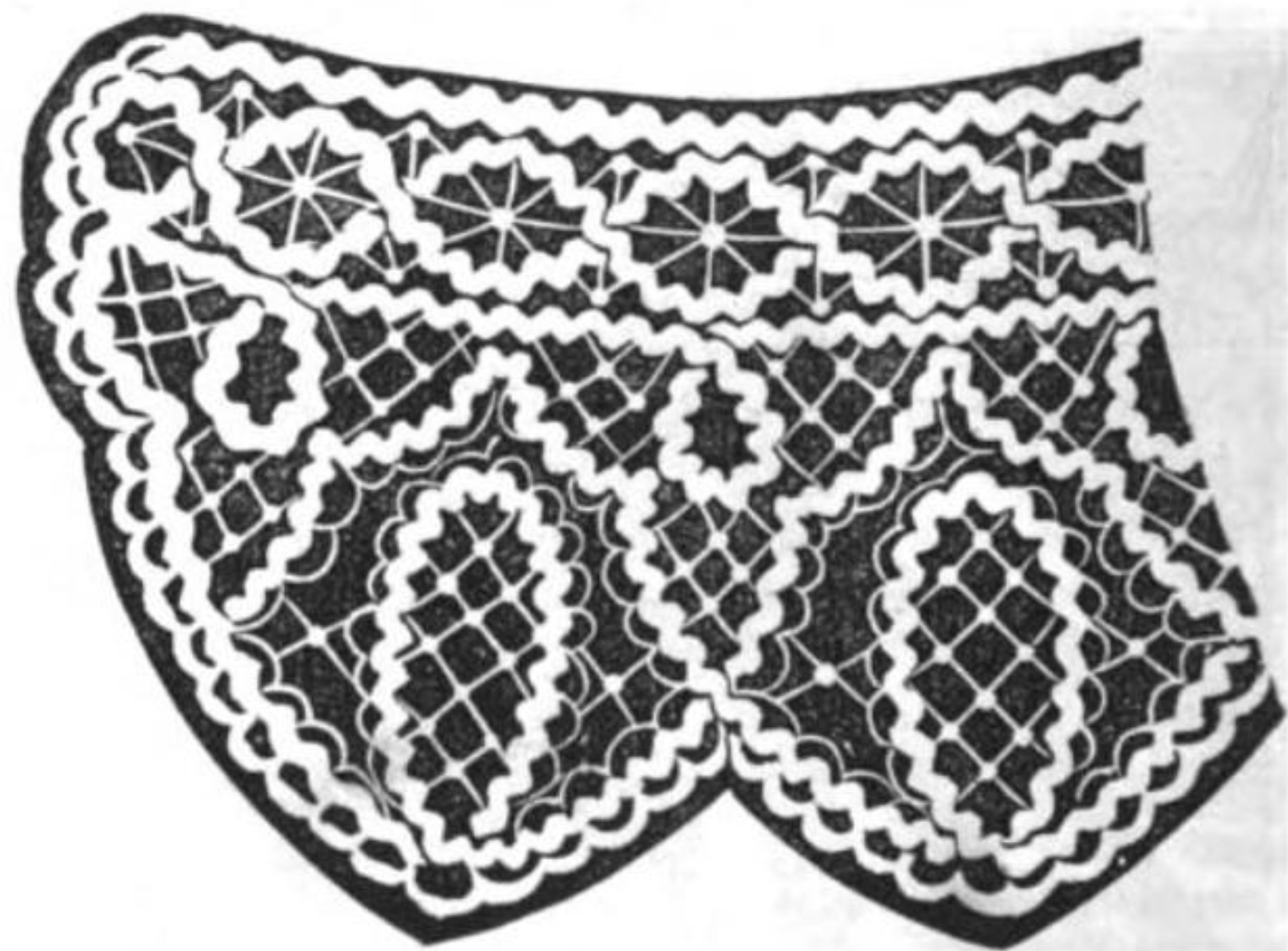
1861 pattern for a woman's lace collar using Hutton's waved lacet braid

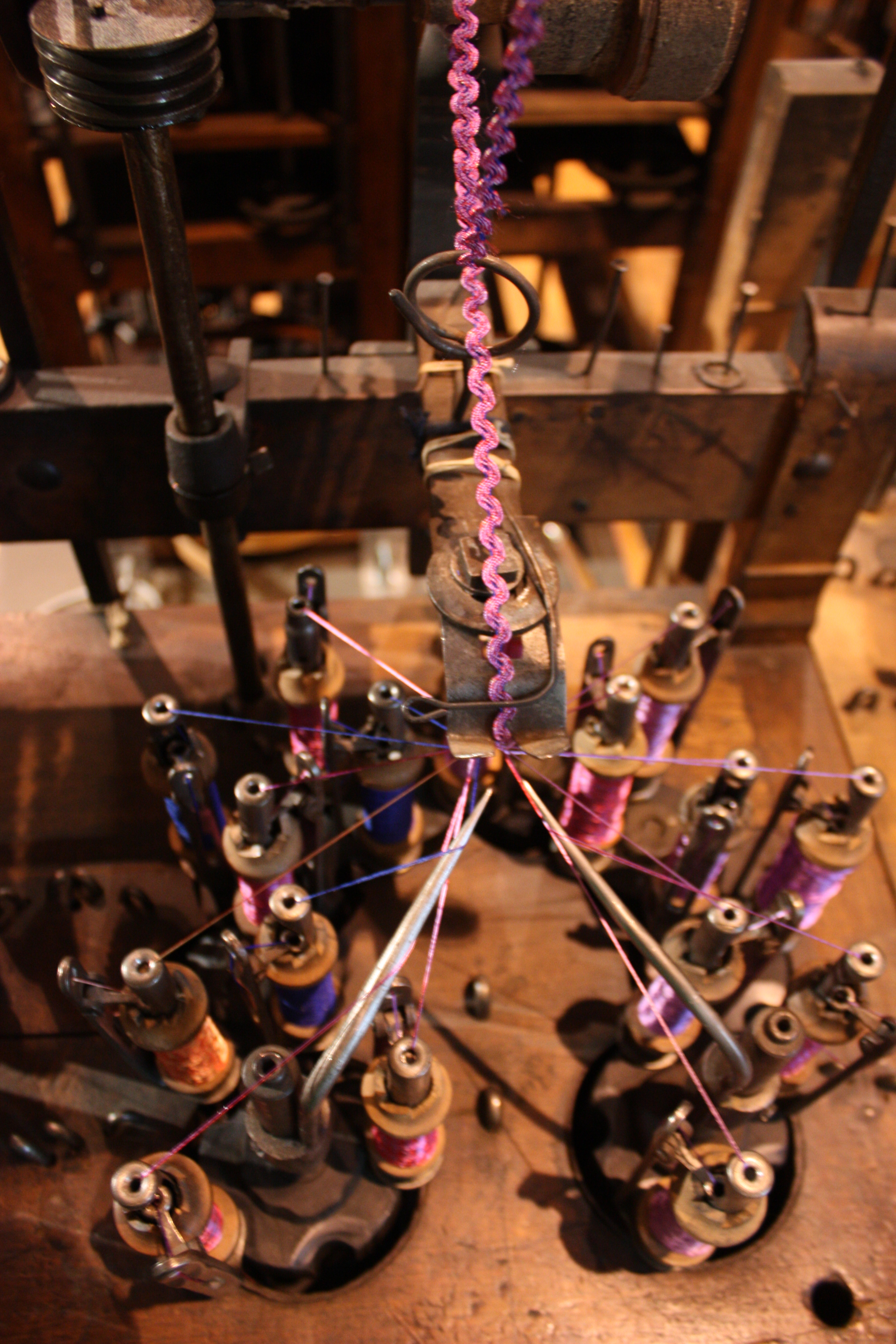
19th-century industrial braiding machine creating rickrack at the Museum of Crafts and Industry, St. Etienne, France

In the 1860s, rickrack was known as waved crochet braid or waved lacet braid.

During the 1890s, American home sewists used imported European rickrack as decorative edgings for dresses, aprons, and lingerie. Rickrack was also stitched into lace elements, which were then used to decorate bedding and other home linens. Between the 1890s and 1910s, rickrack experienced a decrease in popularity.

During the 1910s, rickrack experienced a resurgence in popularity, and American manufacturers began producing rickrack to supply to the domestic market. Among other uses, this rickrack was incorporated into crocheted lace. Books of designs, such as Nufashond Rick Rack Book, helped to popularize the craft.

In rural America in the 1930s, 1940s, and 1950s, rickrack was used to decorate feed sack dresses. These dresses were worn as everyday attire, and were constructed from the large cotton bags that flour, chicken feed, and other goods were shipped in. Since the food had to be shipped in fabric bags anyway, the flour mills competed with each other by using attractive, colorful fabrics that the buyer could either resell or upcycle into dresses, aprons, nightgowns, dishtowels, and other clothing and household items. Adding trim like rickrack was a way to reduce the stigma around needing to use whatever fabric was available, rather than buying it from a store.
