= Heinrich Mauersberger =

German textile inventor for Malimo process of fabric manufacturing

Heinrich Mauersberger (1909–1982) was a German textile inventor. He is credited with inventing Malimo, a technique for stitch bonding, in 1949. He was awarded the patent DD000000008194A. The series of Malimo was further developed by the Chemnitz-based company Karl Mayer.
