= Bigagli =

Bigagli is a surname. Notable people with the surname include:

- Alberta Bigagli (1928–2017), Italian psychologist and poet
- Claudio Bigagli (born 1955), Italian actor
