= 3D textiles =

Three-dimensional fibers, yarns and fabrics

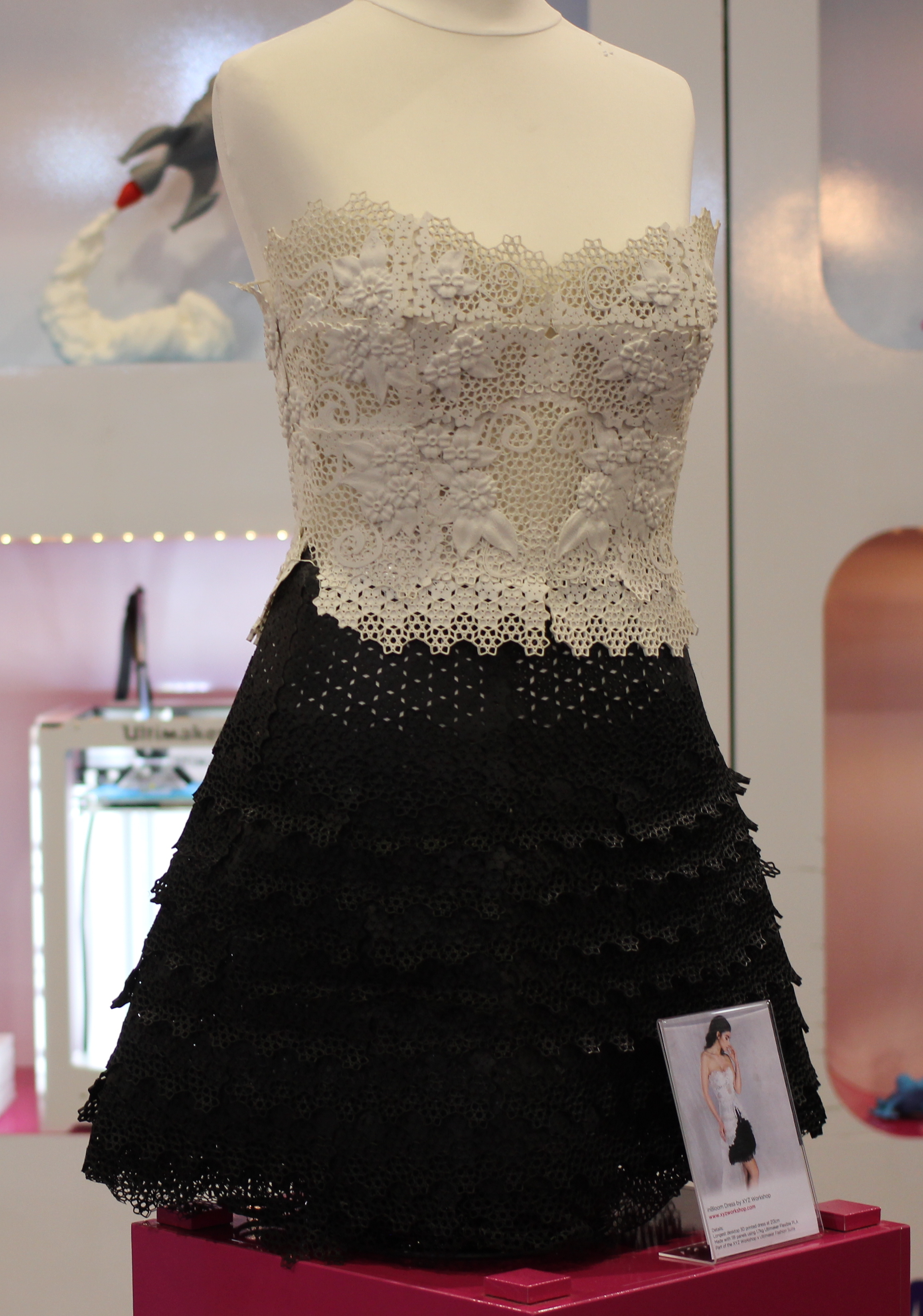
inBloom 3D printed outfit

3D textiles are three-dimensional structures made with different manufacturing methods such as weaving, knitting, braiding, or nonwoven, or made with alternative technologies. 3D textiles are produced with three planar geometry, opposed to 2D textiles that are made on two planes. The weave in 2D textiles is perpendicular. The yarn is fed along two axes: length (x-axis) and width (y-axis), while 3D textiles also have a perpendicular weave, but they have an extra yarn with an angular feeding (z-axis) which creates thickness. 3D weaves are orthogonal weave structures, multilayer structures, and angle interlocks. 3D textiles have more manufacturing opportunities, various properties, and a broader scope of applications. These textiles have a wide range of applications, but they are most commonly used where performance is the primary criterion, such as technical textiles. Composite materials, manufacturing is one of the significant areas of using 3D textiles.

3D structures have two kinds of structural formations, i.e., hollow and solid.

== Types ==
3D fabrics can be formed with 3D weaving, 3D knitting, 3D braiding, non-woven methods and with many newer technologies, such as 3D printing, etc.

3D Fabric type	Advantage and disadvantages	Reason
3D Woven fabrics	Free of delamination, Multilayered, and low in plane properties.	Because of extra strength provided by the z-yarn in the through thickness dimension.
3D knitting fabrics	Low fiber volume fraction	Because of looped structure.
3D Braided fabrics	Free of delamination, Multilayered, and low transverse properties.	Because of interlacement of interwine type
3D Nonwoven fabrics	Lacks mechanical properties	Because of short fibers

=== 3D weaving ===
There are several types of 3D woven fabrics that are commercially available; they can be classified according to their weaving technique.

1. 3D woven interlock fabrics, are 3D woven fabrics produced on a traditional 2D weaving loom, using proper weave design and techniques, it could either have the weaver/z-yarn going through all the thickness of the fabric or from layer to layer.
2. 3D orthogonal woven fabrics, are 3D woven fabrics produced on a special 3D weaving loom. The process to form such fabric was patented by Mohamed and Zhang. The architecture of the 3D orthogonal woven fabric consists of three different sets of yarns; warp yarns (y-yarn), weft yarns (x-yarn), and (z-yarn). The Z - yarn is placed in the through-thickness direction of the preform. In 3D orthogonal woven fabrics there is no interlacing between the warp and weft yarns and they are straight and perpendicular to each other. On the other hand, z-yarns combine the warp and the weft layers by interlacing (moving up and down) along the y-direction over the weft yarn. Interlacing occurs on the top and the bottom surface of the fabric.

==== Advantages ====
- 3D orthogonal woven fabrics have less or no yarn crimp (the difference in length of yarn, before and after weaving); therefore, mechanical properties of fibers are almost fully used in warp and weft directions. Thus, it could benefit from the maximum load carrying capacity of high performance fibers in these directions.
- There is no need for layering to create a part, because the single fabric has a considerable thickness that provides the full three-dimensional reinforcement.

=== 3D knitting ===
3D knitting is a method of forming an article of clothing directly from the yarns. Typical examples are socks and one piece tights. 3D knitted fabrics are also used for the production of certain reinforcement structures. Since 2017, Uniqlo has been offering fully 3D knit garments including T-shirts and dresses through a partnership with Shima Seiki. Other companies and designers have been exploring this technology, including for knit-on-demand or customized garments. Another technology that can be considered 3D knit is spacer knit. This technique creates a flat textile that has a sponge-like character.

=== Nonwoven ===
Non-woven 3D fabrics are made of short fibers (natural and cut filaments of synthetic yarn). They are comparatively less successful.

=== 3D printing ===
==== Additive manufacturing ====
Fabric manufacturing by three-dimensional printer employs additive manufacturing, also known as additive layer manufacturing (ALM), a CAD-aided manufacturing technique that builds the object layer by layer.

3D printing has entered the world of clothing, with fashion designers experimenting with 3D-printed bikinis, shoes, dresses, bags and pouches.

===== Bikini =====
"N-12" is a nylon bikini that was 3D printed by Shapeways.

===== Footwear and accessories =====
Nike is using 3D printing to prototype and manufacture the 2012 Vapor Laser Talon football shoe for players of American football, and New Balance is 3D manufacturing custom-fit shoes for athletes. ''Vapor Laser Talon boots'' has 3D-printed footplates. ''Futurecraft STRUNG'' is another 3D printed variant belongs to Adidas.

===== Dresses =====
Though very expensive, the 3D printer also printed a dress. Dita Von Teese wore a 3D printed gown with a fibonacci sequence that was designed by Michael Schmidt and the architect, Francis Bitonti.

===== Bags and Pouches =====
3D printing is increasingly utilized in the design and production of bags and pouches. Notable examples include XYZBAG, an Italian brand specializing in personalized 3D-printed bags, and JK3D, a company fabricating various 3D-printed products. ASTERYAM, a US-based startup, focuses on creating unique pouches and bags using 3D-printed chainmail fabric.

===== Auxetic textiles =====
Auxetic materials are materials which expand when stretched. They have the ability to be thicker when stretched. Fibers, yarns, and fabrics with auxetic properties are known as auxetic textiles. There are certain types of needle-punched nonwovens. 3D printers are also helpful in making auxetic materials for textiles. These fabrics have advanced properties that are useful in making various composite materials and high-performance applications.

==== Use ====
Auxetic textiles are used in protective clothing, upholstery, sports, filtration, body armor, bulletproof vests (because of shock absorbing properties), etc.

== Applications ==
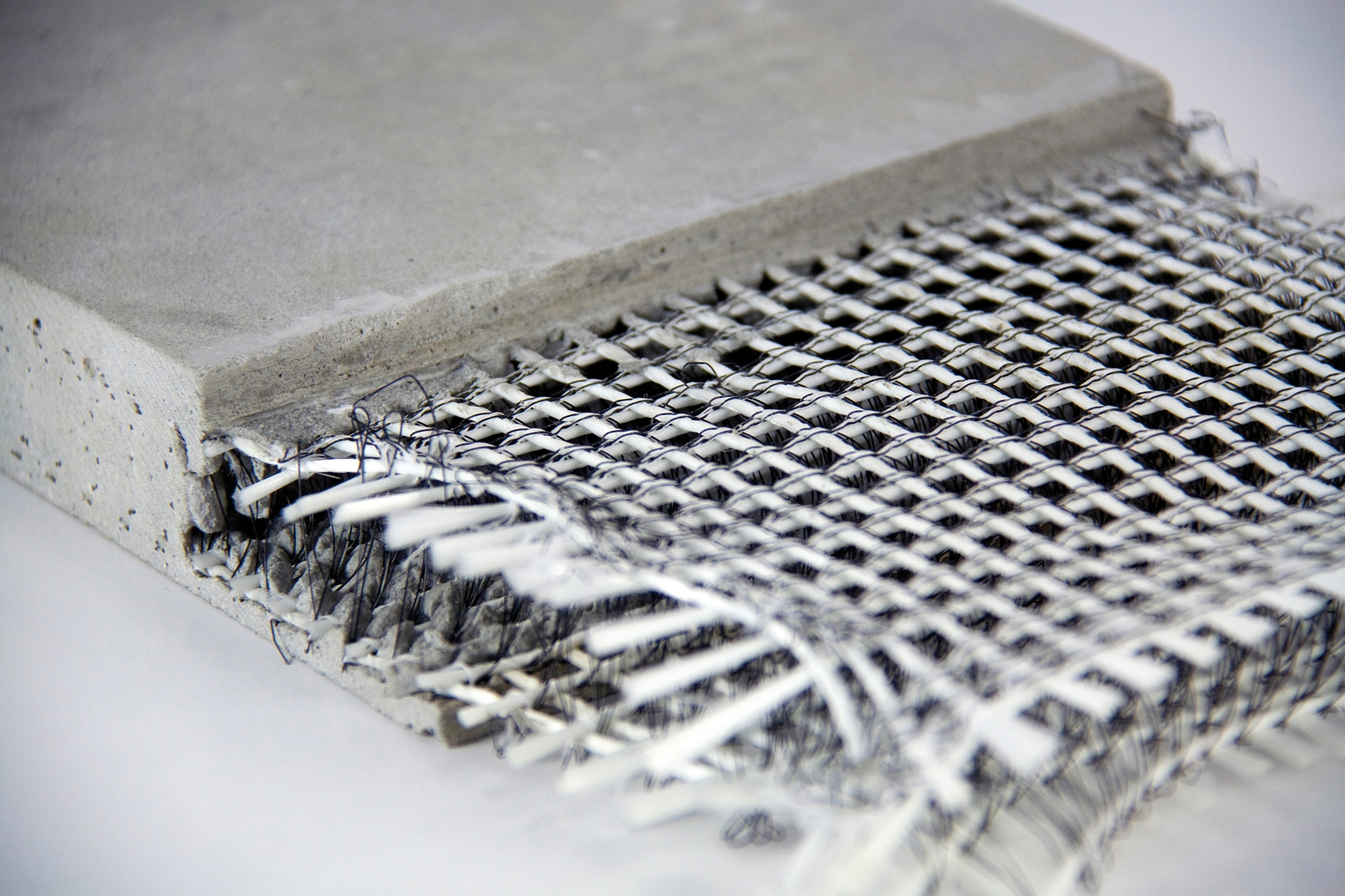
Close-up of a piece of textile-reinforced concrete

Other applications of 3D textiles are:

=== Composite materials ===
3D textiles are primarily used in manufacturing textile structural composites that are usable in military and construction.

=== Medical textiles ===
3D textiles in medical textiles contribute to the following sectors:

==== Wound care ====
In treating a wound over time by creating a favorable environment for healing, using both direct and indirect approaches, as well as preventing skin disintegration. Examples include 3D spacer fabrics.

==== Implants ====
Medical textiles use tubular fabrics with carefully chosen materials that are biocompatible, nonallergic, and nontoxic. For example, Dyneema, PTFE, Polyester, and Teflon are used for implants. The material type varies depending on the implant area; for example, PTFE is preferred for stent implants due to its nonstick properties, while polyolefin is used for mesh implants.

- Aerospace and automobile industry
- Shoes
- Filteration
- Construction industry

== See also ==
- 3D composites
