= Braiding machine =

Device that interlaces strands of yarn or wire

1925 braiding machine in action

The smallest braiding machine consists of two horn gears and three bobbins. This produces a flat, 3-strand braid.

A braiding machine is a device that interlaces three or more strands of yarn or wire to create a variety of materials, including rope, reinforced hose, covered power cords, and some types of lace. Braiding materials include natural and synthetic yarns, metal wires, leather tapes, and others.

== Process ==
1. Fibers are spun into yarn.
2. One or more yarns are twisted together to form a strand.
3. Strands are wound onto bobbins.
4. Bobbins are mounted on carriers.
5. Carriers are mounted onto a braiding machine, where the braiding takes place.

== Horn gear braider ==
In a horn gear braider, bobbins of thread pass one another to the left and right on pseudo-sinusoidal tracks. The bobbins are mounted on spool carriers that are driven by a series of horn gears. A horn gear is a notched disk driven by a spur gear below on the same shaft; bobbins are transferred between notches of adjacent gears. These gears lie below the track plate that the bobbin carriers ride on. The gears must be driven at multiple points on machines that use two or more bobbin sets and cross-shafts.

On a vertically oriented machine, the braided thread is taken up above the machine. The height and diameter of a guide ring affects the characteristics of the braided product. On horizontal machines, the braiding track plate and associated bobbins are rotated 90 degrees and the braided product is produced parallel to the ground. This enables large stiff braided cables to be output horizontally, which eliminates the need for factory buildings with tall ceilings.

Braiding machines, although they have an apparent complex movement of bobbins, are mechanically simple and robust. Modern versions are reliable and can operate for many hours or even days without attention. This enables factories with hundreds of machines to be operated by just a few workers, which reduces cost of labor and makes products cheaper and/or profits higher. These modern machines have incorporated electronic controls with automated controls. Although ropes, cords and fishing line are still the core products of most braiding companies there are many other products including webbing, cable shielding and automotive products such as reinforced brake lines.

The configuration of horn gears affects the shape of the final braid. A closed circle of gears can be used to make a hollow, circular rope. A single row or horseshoe-configuration can be used to create a flat braid. A grid of gears can be used to create solid-core braids, for example a square braid.

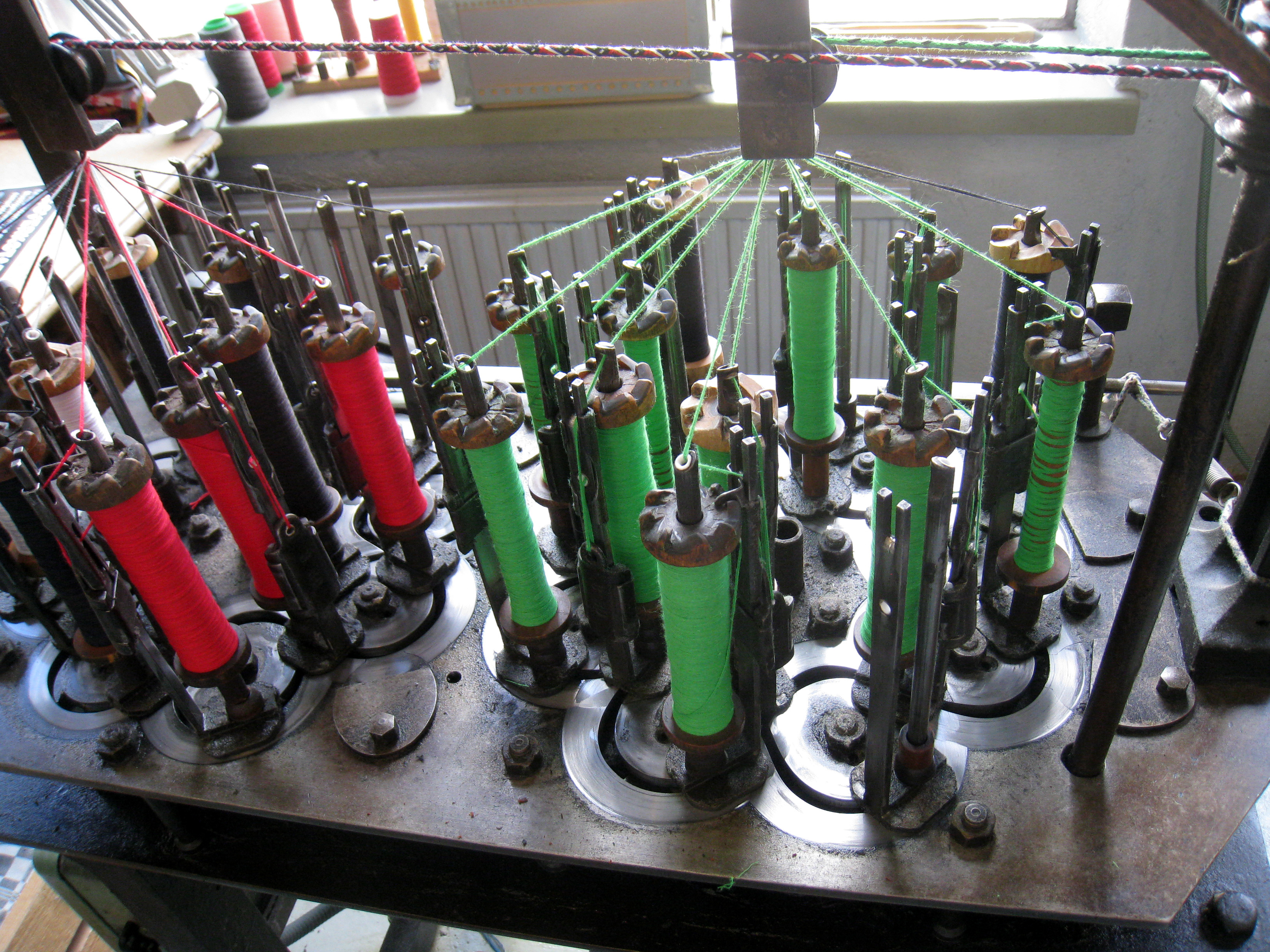
A horn gear braiding machine at the Arbetets Museum (Museum of Work) in Norrköping, Sweden

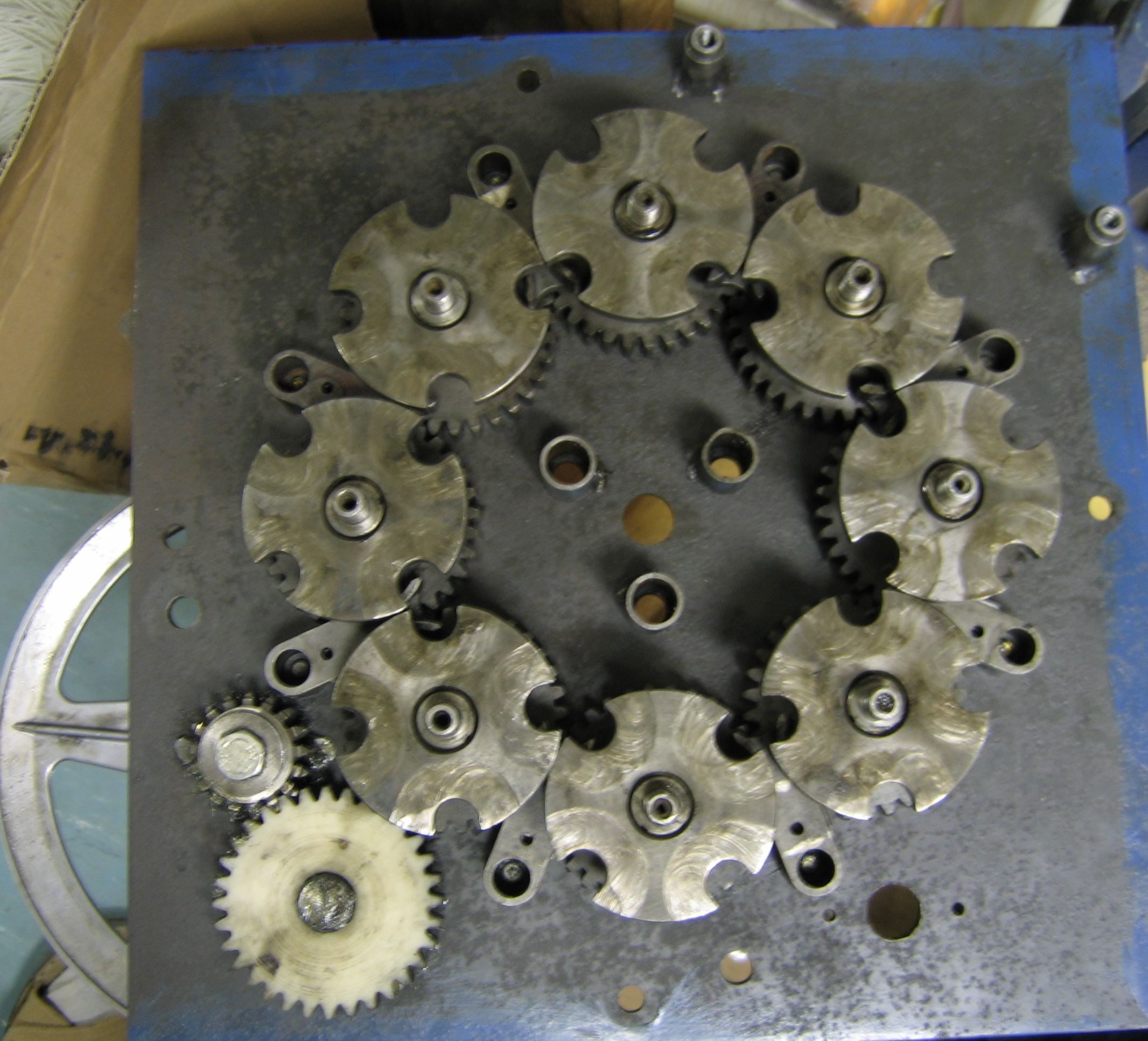
Horn gears mounted on a track plate

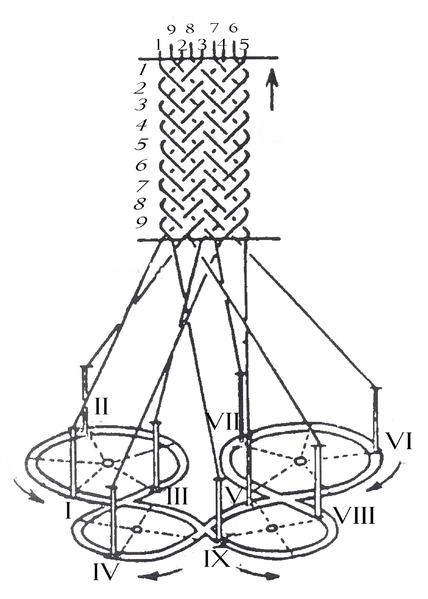
A horn gear machine used to produce a flat braid

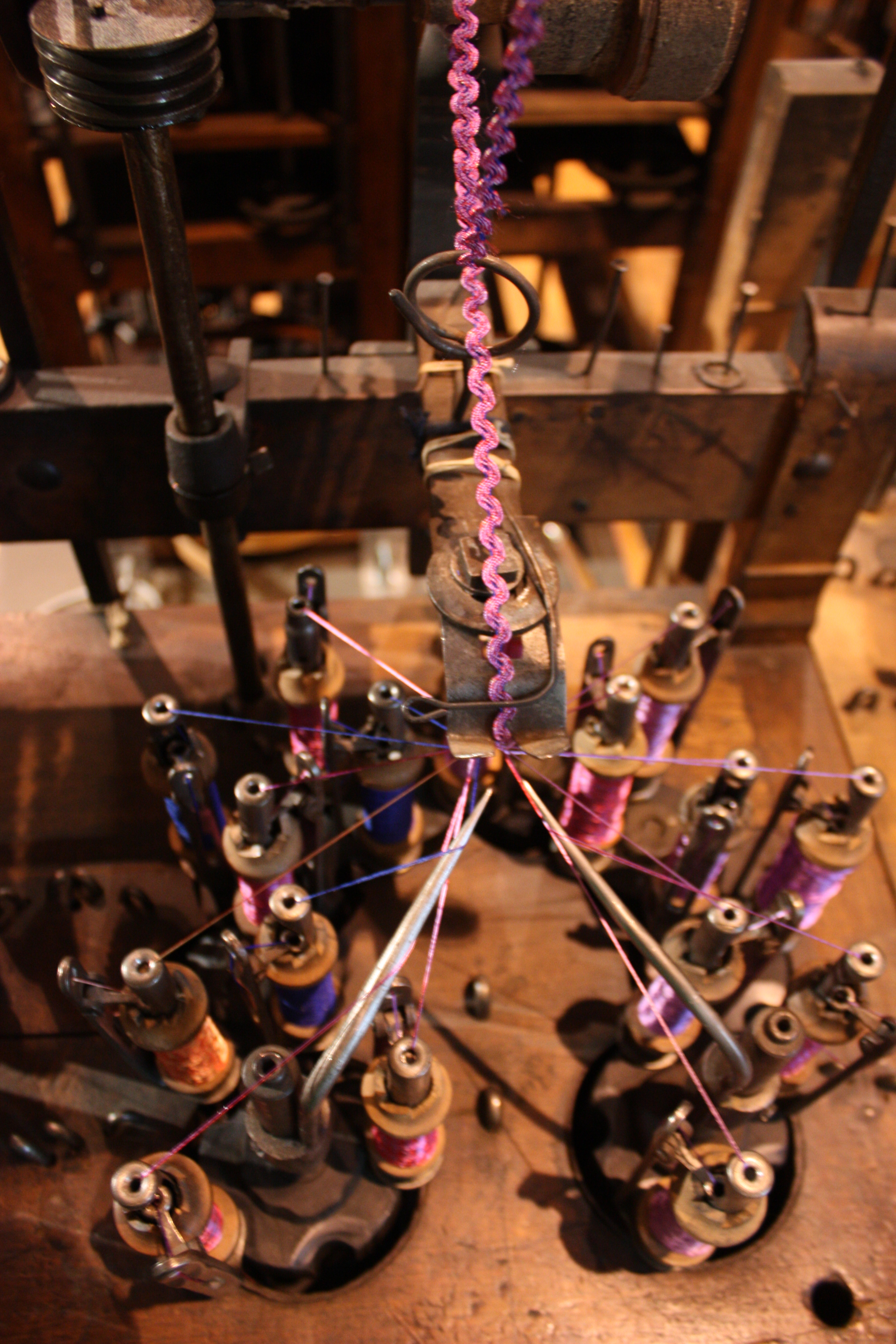
A 19th century braider used to produce rickrack. The wavy edges are produced by varying thread tension.

=== Maypole braider ===
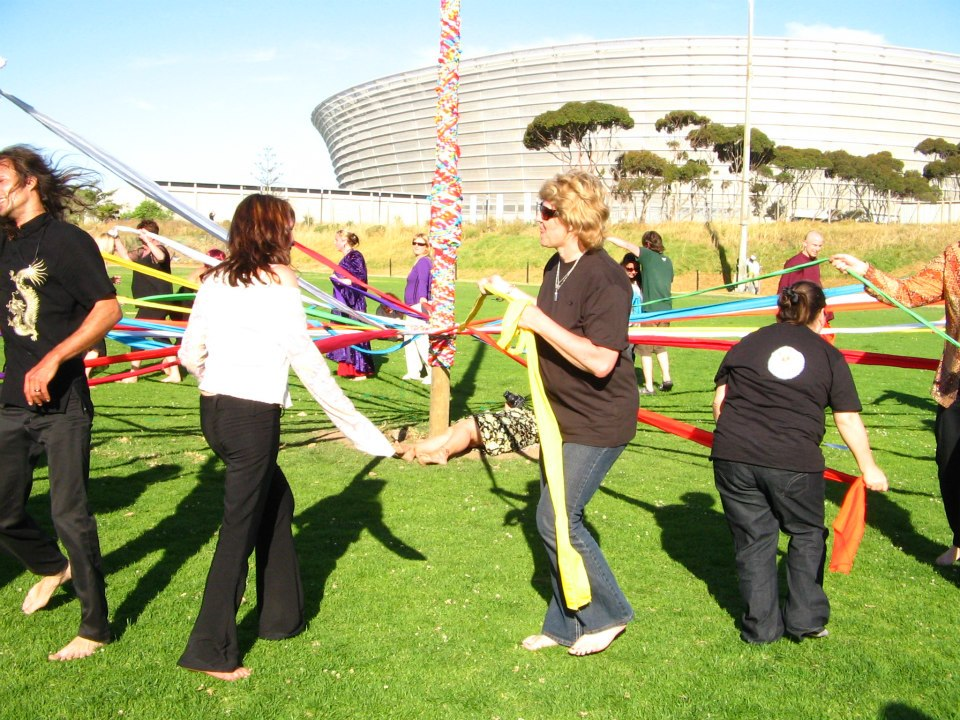
Alternate dancers traveling in opposite directions around a maypole. Notice how dancers use their arms to raise the ribbons to allow other dancers to pass by.

Maypole braiders, also known as circular braiders, are a type of horn gear braider used to produce hollow circular braids. The movement and order of fibers mimics that of ribbons used to decorate a maypole. They were well suited to be driven by the steam engines of the industrial revolution and electric motor-powered machines were common by the beginning of the 20th century.

Common types of braiding machines work in much the same way as the process of decorating a maypole. At the start of decorating a maypole, an even number of ribbons are tied to the top of the pole. Each ribbon is held by one person, and the group of people form a ring about the base of the pole. Half the people travel clockwise and the other half counter clockwise. When passing people traveling in the opposite direction, individuals alternate passing to the right and to the left. This results in a downward forming braid on the pole. As the braid works its way down the pole, the ribbons become shorter and the angle of forming changes as the braid works lower on the pole. On a standard braiding machine, the supply lines are a constant angle and at a constant tension and hence the output braided product is uniform.

This type of braiding can be used to braid a sheathe over a cable as it is drawn through the middle of the machine and is used to produce shielded electrical cables and fibre reinforced hoses. This type of machine is also used to weave fibres such as carbon fibres onto a hollow substrate to produce high performance composite parts, being used in producing rigid lightweight components such as bike frames and yacht masts.

=== Square braider ===
1989 US patent for a horn gear braider specifically designed to create a square braid from eight strands of yarn.

A square braider uses a grid of gears and intersecting tracks to produce a solid-core braid.

In the patent image on the right, the braider has two tracks, one shaded in green and one shaded in red. Four bobbin carriers slide along each track. The four carriers shaded in green travel around the green track in the counter-clockwise direction, and the four carriers shaded in red travel around the red track in the clockwise direction. As the two tracks cross over, the strands twist around each other, making a braid.

The carriers are pushed by four horn gears in the base plate. Each of the horn gears has a gear and a horn on a common shaft. The gears intermesh with each other, with alternate gears traveling in opposite directions. Each horn has four slots for pushing a bobbin carrier. The bobbin carriers get passed along from one horn to the next as they make their way along a track.

== Wardwell Rapid Braider ==
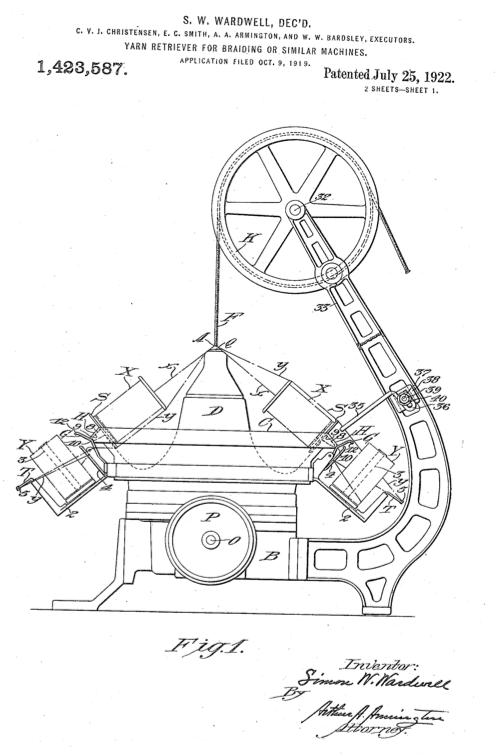
Patent for Wardwell Rapid Braider

The speed of a horn gear braider is limited by the effort needed to force bobbin carriers to follow a serpentine path. In 1922, Simon W. Wardwell solved this problem by moving the strands of yarn instead of the carriers, allowing the carriers to follow a simple circular path. The carriers are in two counter-rotating rings, while lever arms driven by a cam guide the strands of yarn from the outer ring up and down between the carriers of the inner ring. Because a lever arm has much less mass than a bobbin and carrier, the machine can run faster.

== Track and column braider ==
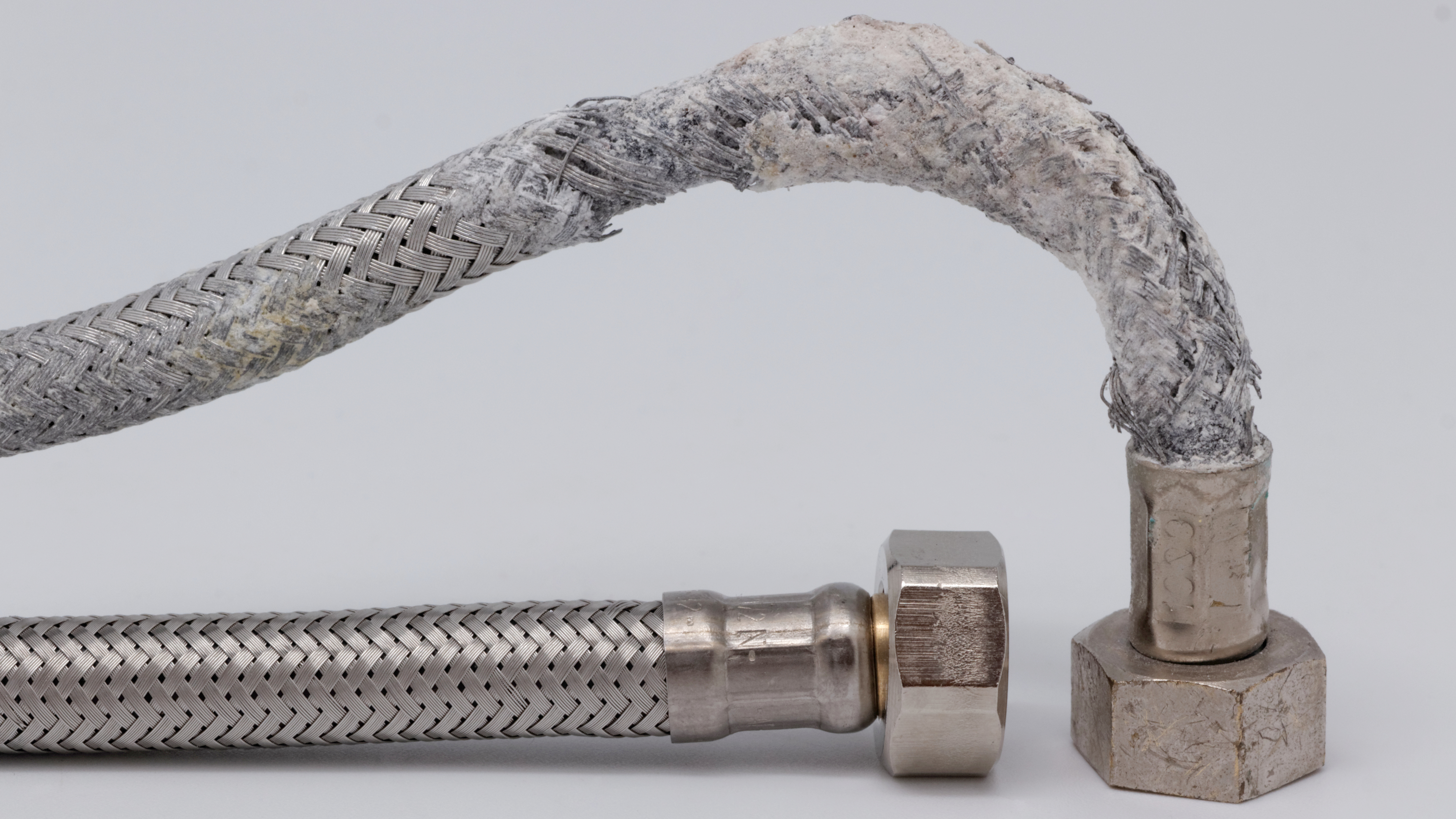
Braiding gives a metal hose like this flexibility and strength.

In a track and column braider, bobbin carriers follow tracks in a two dimensional array of rows and columns, instead of circular paths defined by horn gears.
