= Magnetic ring spinning =

Method of yarn production

Magnetic ring spinning, magnetic spinning, or innovative spinning is a ring spinning technology for making yarn based on magnetic levitation. This technique functions without a traveler sliding over the ring, enabling much higher spinning rates.

== Description ==
Ring spinning stands alone as the standard of high-quality yarn suitable for any type of textile end product. The main technological limitation of ring spinning lies with the metal/metal contact between the traveler and ring. This contact creates frictional heat and rapid wear, resulting in limitations on production speed, a drop in yarn quality with time.

Magnetic ring spinning design approach is a patented technology that aims to eliminate the traveler from the ring spinning system and replace it with a magnetically suspended disc that rotates in magnetic field. This new spinning concept, expounded in a 2005 dissertation at Auburn University, Auburn, Alabama, was developed to take advantage of the quality features produced by ring spinning and adding to it the much higher spinning speeds by avoiding the traditional limitations of the traditional system.

Magnetic spinning system mainly consists of a lightweight rotor magnetically suspended inside a fixed stator (Figure 1). The rotor can spin freely inside the stator. The stator is equipped with electromagnets that always keep the rotor in its central position. The rotor in this configuration replaces the ring and traveller in the traditional spinning system.

== See also ==
- Cotton mill
- Cotton-spinning machinery
- DREF friction spinning
- Magnetic levitation
- Open-end spinning
- Spinning
- Spinning wheel
- Textile manufacturing
