= Air-jet spinning =

Textile-spinning method that uses compressed air to twist fibers

Air-jet spinning (also called air spinning, jet spinning, or fasciated yarn spinning) is a method of spinning staple-fiber yarns in which a high-velocity stream of compressed air twists wrapper fibers around a core of parallel fibers. The resulting yarn has a fasciated structure (a largely parallel core wrapped in twisted fibers). Air-jet spinning development initiated in the mid-1950s and was first successfully commercialized by Murata Machinery in Japan during the early 1980s. Today, it is used for high-speed production of knitted and woven yarns with low hairiness.

== History ==
Experiments involving the use of air to assist in spinning date to the mid-20th century. In 1955, the German inventor Konrad Goetzfried filed a patent for a "method and apparatus for pneumatic spinning of a yarn" (Verfahren und Vorrichtung zum pneumatischen Spinnen eines Fadens). This is generally considered the first description of the air-jet spinning concept.

Research and patent activity by industrial firms followed. In particular, DuPont developed fasciated yarn methods in the 1950s and early 1960s. Their activities culminated with the release of the Rotofil machine in 1963. DuPont's Rotofil system is commonly cited as the first attempt to commercialize air-jet spinning but failed to win market acceptance due to its limitations.

The first commercially viable machines were developed in Japan. In 1982, Murata Machinery introduced the Murata Jet Spinner (MJS), which established air-jet spinning as an industrial production method. Murata's MJS attracted immediate industrial attention for spinning fine counts at production speeds far above contemporary ring frames. Shortly after, other Japanese manufacturers such as Toyota and Howa demonstrated their own air-jet machines.

In 1997, Murata launched the Murata Vortex Spinner (MVS), which improved cotton processing and produced stronger, more ring-like yarns.

In 2024, Swiss company Rieter announced the J 70, capable of delivery speeds of up to 600 m/min.

== Process ==
Air-jet spinning is preceded by conventional fiber preparation (carding, drawing, combing if required). A fiber strand is conveyed into a nozzle chamber where compressed air creates a vortex. This vortex wraps some fibers around the outside of the strand, forming the characteristic core–sheath structure. Two main variants are encountered:

- Two-nozzle systems: Pioneered by the Murata Jet Spinner (MJS). Such systems utilize sequential jets producing counter-rotating vortices, creating wrapper fibers in two stages.
- Vortex spinning: Introduced by the Murata Vortex Spinner (MVS). Vortex spinning produces a three-dimensional, rather than two-dimensional, vortex, better suited to cotton and blends, and creating yarns with properties closer to ring-spun yarn.

== Yarn characteristics and speed ==
Air-jet (fasciated) yarns typically have lower "hairiness" than ring yarns and can be produced at far higher delivery speeds. Technical overviews and comparative studies report that air-jet systems deliver substantially higher production rates than ring frames and, depending on configuration and count, can also outpace open-end spinning. Reported machine delivery speeds for commercial air-jet equipment commonly range from about 120–600 m/min depending on machine model and yarn count, with modern vortex systems frequently at the higher end of that range.

== Market share ==
Early commercial attempts were not broadly adopted, but in the 1980s, Japanese machines re-established industrial interest and led to substantial adoption in many textile mills. By the mid-1980s, Murata reported large installations in the U.S. textile industry. Later developments continued to improve air-jet capability, automation and delivery speed.

As of 2023, air-jet systems constitute a small but growing fraction of the spinning machine industry, with an estimated 637,000 spindles installed globally.

== See also ==
- Ring spinning
- Open-end spinning
- Textile machinery
- Cotton-spinning machinery
