= Nina Ruge =

German journalist, TV presenter and author (born 1956)

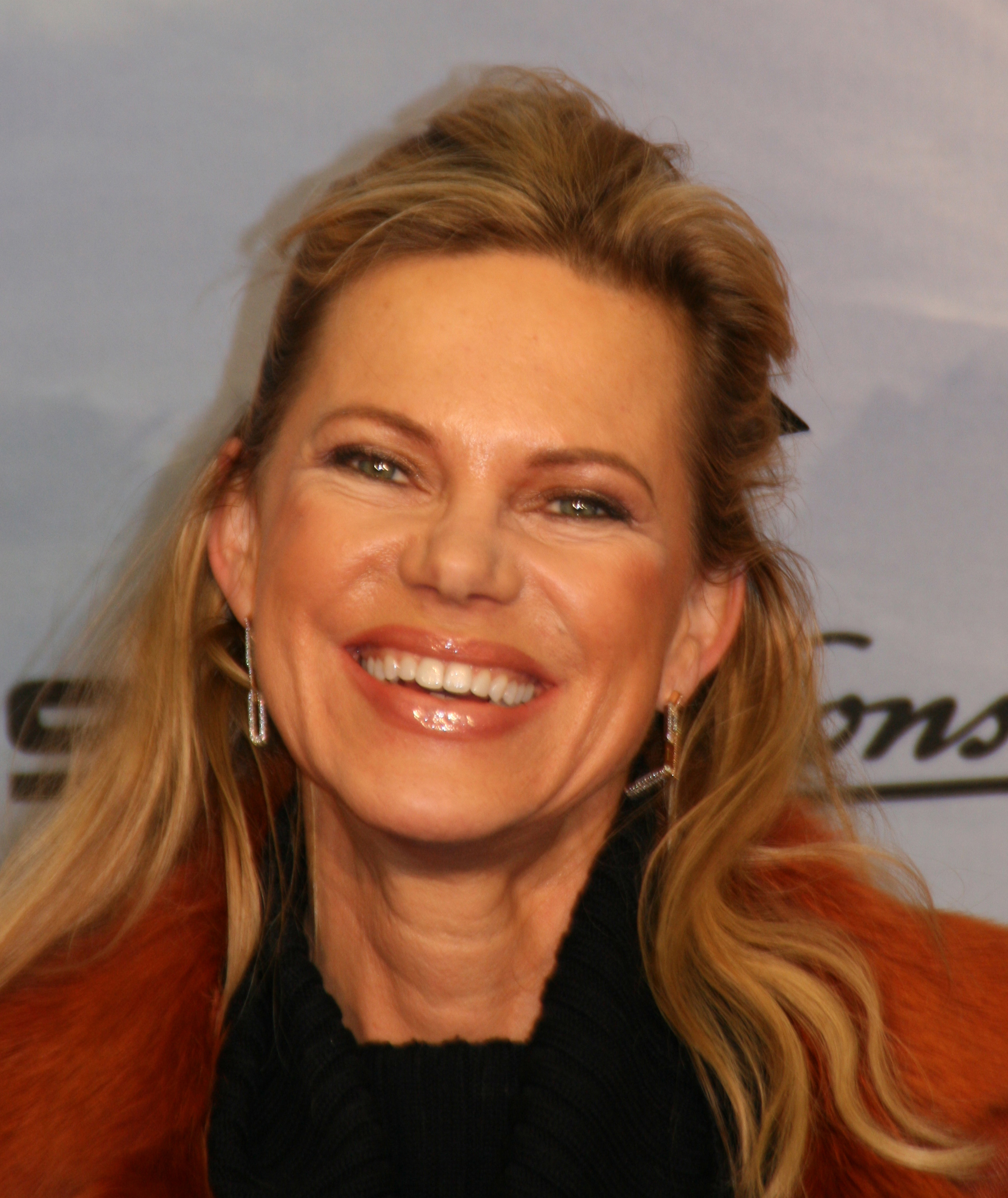
- Ruge at the premiere of the film "Asterix bei den Olympischen Spielen" in Munich (15. January 2008)
- Born: Nina Ruge; 24 August 1956 (age 70); Munich, West Germany
- Education: German language and literature
- Occupations: TV presenter, journalist, author
- Notable credit: Leute heute

Nina Ruge (born 24 August 1956 in Munich) is a German journalist, TV presenter and author.

== Early life and education ==
Ruge is the daughter of an engineering professor and visited the Ina-Seidel-Schule in Braunschweig. Her sister Annette is an aeromedical doctor at the European Aviation Safety Agency in Cologne. After finishing high school at the age of 17 she studied biology and German language and literature at the TU Braunschweig to become a teacher. She passed her final exams with distinction.

== Career ==
While she was teaching at a Gymnasium in Wolfsburg from 1983 to 1987, she started to work on a freelance basis for the NDR radio. In 1987 she moved to Berlin to work as script girl, assistant director of a number of TV and film productions and editorial assistant with the SFB family program.

In 1988 she was one of the editors who was involved in setting up RIAS-TV where she presented the evening news program Abendschau and later the breakfast TV show Frühstückfernsehen. Several times during her career she took the risk to leave established shows for new productions where she had more influence, like her move from the well established heute journal to the heute nacht news show. Her daily lifestyle magazine Leute heute became very successful after it was at first less popular than expected and in 1995 the 2000th episode was shown. Ruge finished nearly every edition of her show Leute heute with the quote Alles wird gut (Everything will turn out fine) which became her trademark and which she also used for some of her book titles. In November 2006 Ruge announced to end her work for Leute heute on 3 February 2007 in order to have more time for her private life.

In the 1999 cinema film On the Wings of Love Nina Ruge appeared in the role of Clarissa together with Maximilian Schell, Gudrun Landgrebe and Mathieu Carrière.

Nina Ruge has also been an entrepreneur since 2020. Together with her husband, top manager Wolfgang Reitzle, and Swiss billionaire Michael Pieper she has invested in the biotech startup Tomorrowlabs GmbH. The company, which was founded in 2016 in Vienna by the physician Dominik Duscher and pharmacologist Dominik Thor, is based on the patent-pending HSF ("HIF strengthening factor") active ingredient, which is supposed to promote skin and hair regeneration. Together with Duscher, she published in 2020 her 25th book: Altern wird heilbar (Curing Aging), a German bestseller.

== Charity and honors ==
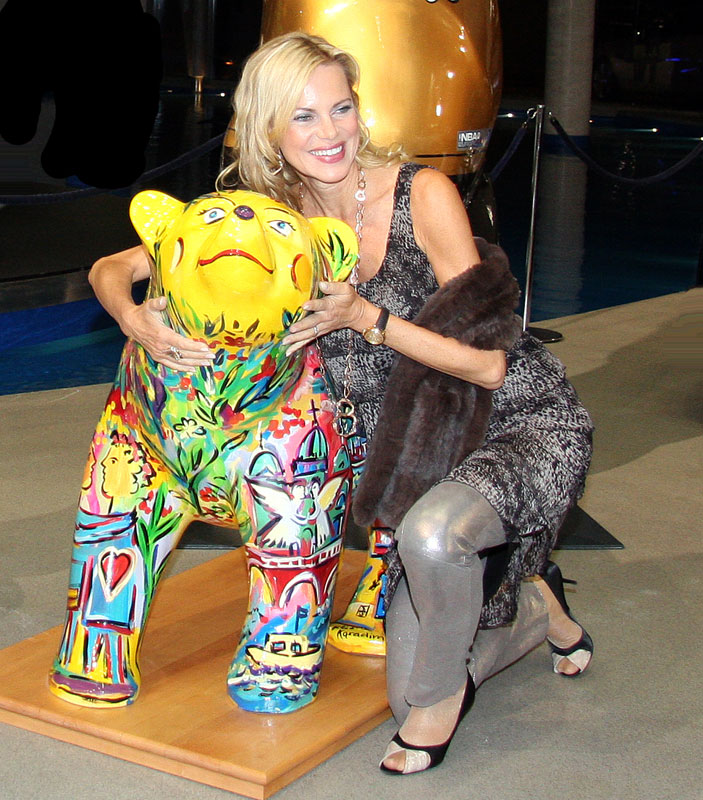
Nina Ruge at an auction of Buddy Bears in aid of UNICEF in Berlin, 2010

In addition to her work Nina Ruge is involved in a number of charities like UNICEF (as Goodwill Ambassador), Felix Burda Stiftung – Darmkrebs Prävention and Rosenthal – Porzellan "Charity – Teller". She is also the patron of the "Netzwerk von und für Frauen und Mädchen mit Behinderungen in Bayern".

In 2005 Nina Ruge was honored on the island Mainau by naming a bright orange-red rose after her.

== Personal life ==
From 1995 to 1998 she was married to the TV producer Stefen Voss. In September 2001 she married Wolfgang Reitzle, CEO of the international company Linde AG and she currently resides in Munich.

== TV and radio work ==
- TV-Abenjournal (RIAS, 1988)
- TV-Frühstückfernsehen (RIAS, 1988–1991)
- heute journal (ZDF, 1989–1994)
- Sonntagsshow (3Sat, 1991 – ?)
- Pep (3Sat, 1991 – ?)
- Tagesgespräch (3Sat, 1991 – ?)
- Newsquiz (3Sat, 1992 – ?)
- Standpunkte (Deutsche Welle TV)
- Boulevard Deutschland (Deutsche Welle TV)
- DW-Journal (Deutsche Welle TV, 1994 – ?)
- heute nacht (ZDF, 1994–1997)
- tele-zoo (ZDF, 1994–1997)
- 19-zehn (3Sat, 1996–2003)
- Classic cuts (3Sat, 1997 – ?)
- Leute heute (ZDF, 1997–2007)
- Klassik Leute (Klassik Radio, 2000 – ?)
- Alles wird gut (ZDF, 2007 – ?)
- nina.ruge.mode (ZDF, 2007 – ?)

== Books ==
- Achtung Aufnahme. Erfolgsgeheimnisse prominenter Fernsehmoderatoren (with Stefan Wachtel, 1997, Econ) ISBN 3-430-17872-X
- Mira May und das Zauberhandy (January 2002, Baumhaus Medien) ISBN 3-8315-0226-9
- Alles wird gut. Beflügelnde Worte (July 2002, Marion von Schröder Verlag) ISBN 3-547-77884-0
- Mein persönliches 'Alles wird gut' Buch (September 2003, Ehrenwirth) ISBN 3-431-03134-X
- Lucy im Zaubergarten (2003, Heyne) ISBN 3-453-87127-8
- Alles wird gut. 52 Streicheleinheiten für die Seele (with Margaretha Höbener, March 2004, Heyne) ISBN 3-453-88002-1
- Heilpflanzen. Blüten, Tee und Zauberkraft (June 2004, Kinderleicht Wissen), ISBN 3-937810-03-X
- Alles wird gut (December 2004, Ullstein) ISBN 3-453-87002-6
- Alles wird gut in der Liebe (February 2005, Ehrenwirth) ISBN 3-431-03630-9
- Alles wird gut im Job (September 2005, Ehrenwirth) ISBN 3-431-03641-4
- Keine Angst vor großen Köchen (with Michael Wissing, November 2005, Christian) ISBN 3-88472-698-6
- Das Geheimnis der Selbstheilung. Wege zu einem starken Immunsystem (with Lutz Bannasch, March 2006, Ullstein) ISBN 3-550-07870-6
- Nina Ruge erzählt die schönsten biblischen Geschichten (with Katja Pagel, September 2006, Gütersloher Verlagshaus) ISBN 3-579-06712-5
- Liebeszauber (with Elmar Bartel, January 2007, Ehrenwirth Verlag) ISBN 3-431-03691-0
- Altern wird heilbar: Jung bleiben mit der Kraft der drei Zellkompetenzen (with Dominik Duscher, June 2020, Graefe und Unzer) ISBN 978-3-8338-7178-8
