= DREF friction spinning =

Textile technology

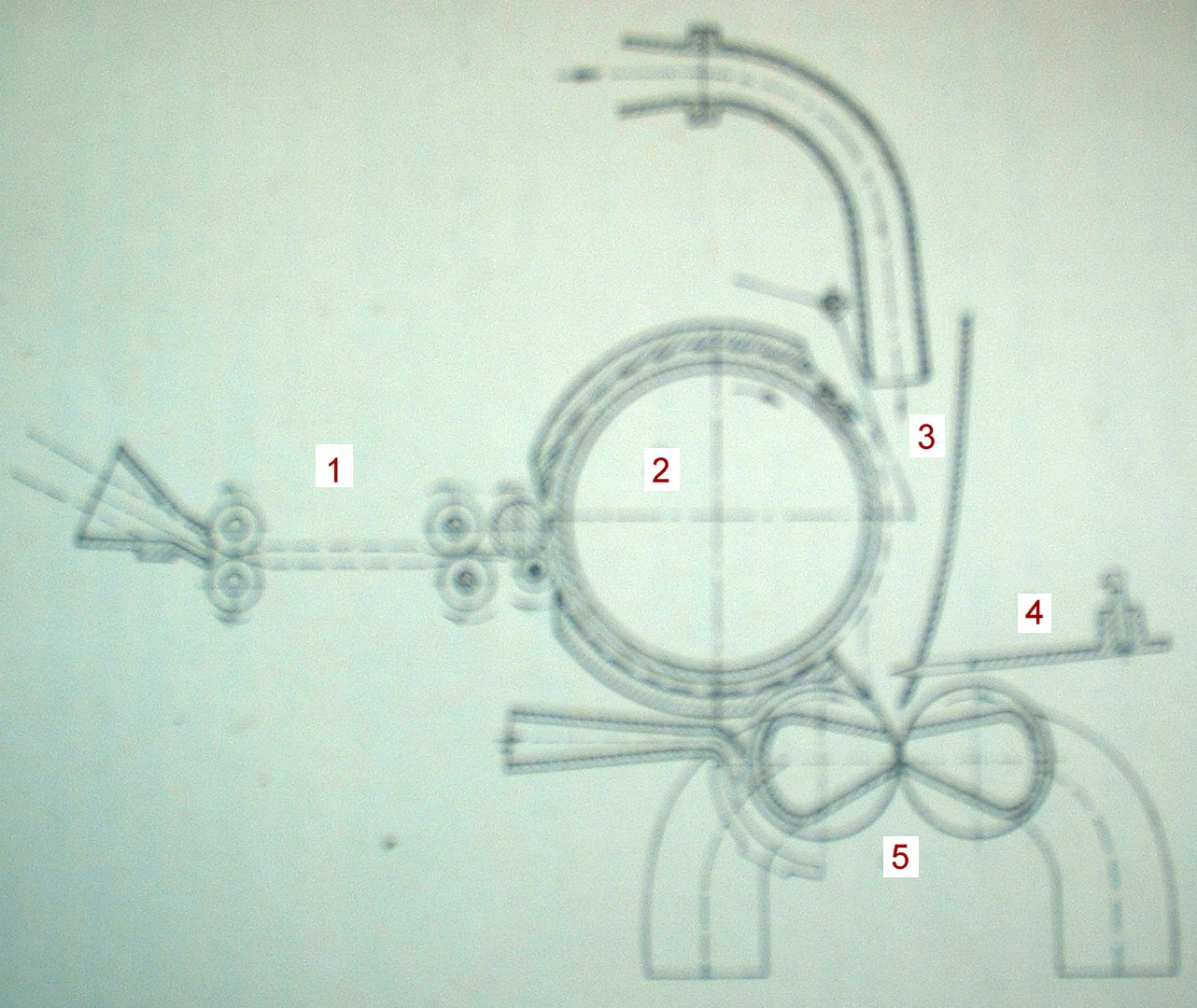
Friction spinning: air is used to propel the sliver of fibres (1) to a carding drum (2) where they drop (3) between two perforated drums (5) that integrate and twist the yarn.

Friction spinning or DREF spinning is a textile technology that is suitable for spinning coarse counts of yarns and technical core-wrapped yarns. DREF yarns are bulky with low tensile strength, making them suitable for blankets and mop yarns. They can be spun from asbestos, carbon fibres and are capable of being made into filters for water systems. Yarns such as Rayon and Kevlar can be spun using this method. The technology was developed around 1975 by Dr. Ernst Fehrer.

== Spinning technologies ==
There are three current technologies used today for spinning fibres:

1. Roving spinning which uses the legacy ring -spinning technology of the twentieth century,
2. Open end, Rotor or Break Spinning used for high quality threads
3. Dref friction spinning for other yarns.

Friction spinning is the fastest of all these techniques though the yarn is irregular and bulkier, making it suitable only for some applications.

== Yarn formation in friction spinning system ==
The mechanism of yarn formation consists of three distinct operations: feeding of fibres, fibre integration and twist insertion.

=== Feeding ===
The individual fibres are transported by air currents and deposited in the spinning zone. The mode of fibre feed has a particular effect on fibre extent and fibre configuration in yarn and on its properties. There are two methods of fibre feed:

- Direct feed

The fibres are fed directly onto the rotating fibre mass that outer part of the yarn tail.

- Indirect feed.

The fibres are first accumulated on the in-going roll and then transferred to the yarn tail.

=== Fibres integration ===
The fibres assembles through a feed tube onto a yarn core/tail within the shear field, is provided by two rotating spinning drums and the yarn core is in between them. The shear causes sheath fibres to wrap around the yarn core. The fibre orientation is highly dependent on the decelerating fibres arriving at the assembly point through the turbulent flow. The fibres in the friction drum have two probable methods for integration of incoming fibres to the sheath. One method, the fibre assembles completely on to perforated drum before their transfer to the rotating sheath. In the other method, fibres are laid directly on to rotating sheath.

=== Twist insertion ===
There has been much research on the twisting process in friction spinning. In friction spinning, the fibres are applied twist with more or less one at a time without cyclic differentials in tension in the twisting zone. Therefore, fibre migration may not take place in friction spun yarns. The mechanism of twist insertion for core type friction spinning and open end friction spinning are different, which are described below.

==== Twist insertion in core-type friction spinning ====
In core type friction spinning, the core, made of a filament or a bundle of staple fibres, is false twisted by the spinning drum. The sheath fibres are deposited on the false twisted core surface and are wrapped helically over the core with varying helix angles. It is believed that the false twist in the core gets removed once the yarn is emerged from the spinning drums, so that this yarn has a virtually twist-less core. However, it is quite possible for some amount of false twist to remain in the fact that the sheath entraps it during yarn formation in the spinning zone.

==== Twist insertion in open end type friction spinning ====
In open end type friction spinning the fibres in the yarn are integrated as a stacked cone. The fibres in the surface of the yarn found more compact and good packing density than the axial fibres in the yarn.

The yarn tail can be considered as a loosely constructed conical mass of fibres, formed at the nip of the spinning drums. It is of very porous and lofty structure. The fibres rotating at very high speed.

== History ==
Dr. Ernst Fehrer (1919–2001) invented and patented the DREF friction spinning process in 1973. He had begun work on the development of this alternative to mule, ring and rotor open end spinning with the objective of surmounting the physico-mechanical limits on capacity in yarn engineering, enhancing the production speeds. The system was named using letters from his honorific and name. His company Dr. Ernst Fehrer AG, Textilmaschinenfabrik, was based in Linz-Leonding, Austria. He died in December 2000 at age 81 having produced more than 1000 patents.

Fehrer began his career in research, development and inventing at age 14 writing his first patent at 18. He developed a high-speed needle loom with counterbalancing technology as well as the "DREF"system. In 1988, Fehrer received the TAPPI Nonwovens Division Award for his contributions to nonwovens manufacturing technology, and in 1994 Fehrer received Textile World's first Lifetime Achievement Award.

=== Development ===
The Dref I was in development in 1975; a three-head machine, and in 1977 the first DREF 2 for the coarse yarn count range came onto the market. In view of its success, Dr. Fehrer then created the DREF 3, which was designed for the medium yarn count range and made its debut at the ITMA '79 in Hanover, before entering serial production in 1981.

New generations of the DREF 2 followed in 1986 and 1994 and the DREF 3/96 was launched at the ITMA in Milan. The 1999 ITMA in Paris witnessed the arrival of the DREF 2000, the first of which was sold prior to the fair. Full production of the DREF 2000 commenced in the autumn of 1999 in co-ordination with presentations at the ATME, USA and the SIMAT in Argentina. In 2001, the DREF 2000 also went on display in Asia at the ITMA Singapore and in Central America at the EXINTEX, Mexico.

Fehrer entered co-operations with professional textile companies to develop the technology; Rieter AG in Switzerland and Oerlikon Schlafhorst in Germany. With this co-operation the last machine developed by DREF was the DREF 3000, which was available for testing in the new facility in Linz, Austria in 2001. Saurer AG purchased Fehrer AG in 2005. DREFCORP, along with all its associated patents and intellectual property was purchased in 2007 by Nordin Technologies – a Malaysian company – that continues to develop and manufacture DREF 2000 and DREF 3000 machines as well as continuing to serve the international market with parts for the original Fehrer Dref II, Dref III, Dref 2000 and Dref 3000 friction spinning machines.

== See also ==
- Mule spinning
- Ring spinning
- Spinning
- Air-jet spinning
- Open end spinning
- Carding
- Cotton-Spinning Machinery
