= Forbo Movement Systems =

German industrial manufacturer

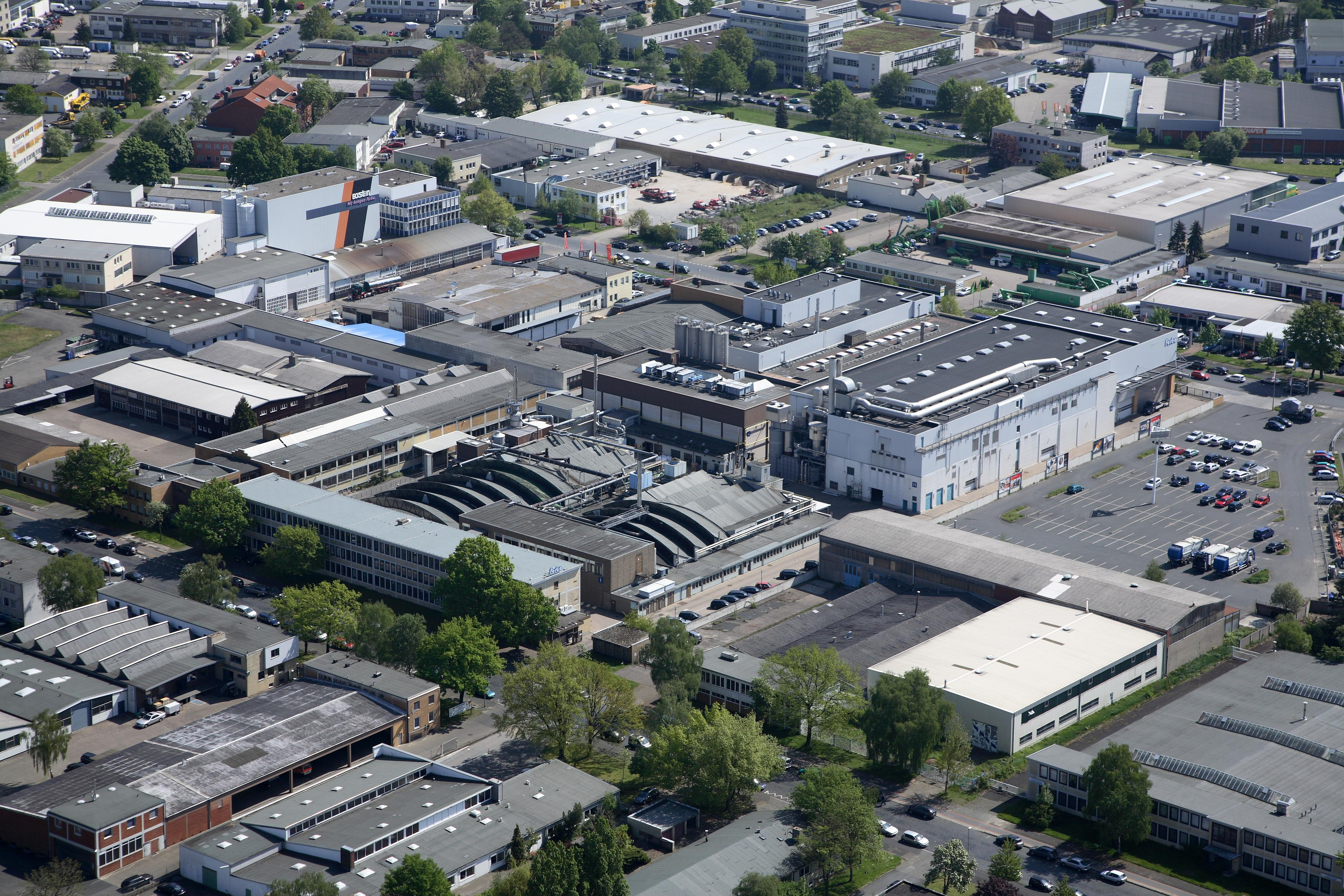
- Factory and administration office in Hanover
- Type: Subsidiary
- Founded: 1919; 107 years ago
- Founder: Ernst Siegling
- Headquarters: Hanover, Germany
- Key people: Marc Richard Deimling (Group Executive Vice President)
- Products: Conveyor and processing belts, flat belts, modular belts, timing belts
- Owners: Forbo Beteiligungen GmbH since 1 January 1994 then Forbo Holding
- Number of employees: 2,441 (FTEs) worldwide (2019)
- Website: forbo-siegling.com

The Forbo Siegling Group is a German manufacturing company that makes conveyor and power transmission belts (flat belts) made of synthetic materials. It is headquarters in Hanover. The group has eight production facilities in Europe, Asia and America, as well as warehouses and workshops in over 50 countries. There are Forbo Siegling service points in more than 300 places worldwide. The company was founded by Ernst Siegling in 1919 and was acquired by the Swiss corporation Forbo Holding in 1994.

== History ==
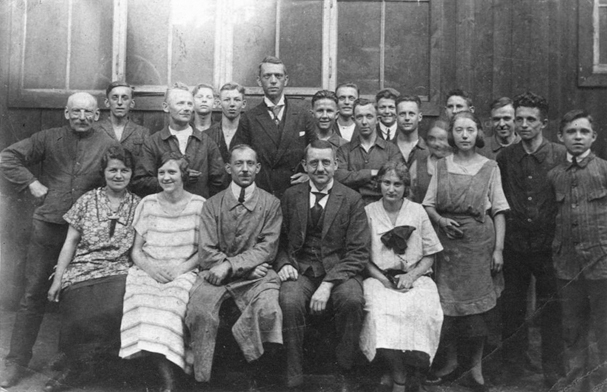
Company founder Ernst Siegling (in middle at back) with his employees

In 1919 Ernst Siegling founded a drive belt factory under his own name. Soon afterwards he started producing traditional, leather flat belts. Early in the 1920s chrome leather upright belts were being made and consisted of many riveted leather belts placed upright.

At the beginning of the 1940s, a patent was registered under the Extremultus brand for a multi-layer flat belt made of nylon and chrome leather. The over 98% energy efficiency offered was a vast increase compared with traditional belt and chain drives.

Automation and efficiency became key issues in the years of the German economic miracle. During this period, Hellmut Siegling, the son of the company's founder, developed a lightweight conveyor belt for inter-company material flow at the request of biscuit manufacturer Hermann Bahlsen. This new belt has since been marketed under the Transilon brand name. It was comparatively thin and light, but at the same time featured low-elongation, and was dimensionally stable, very quiet to operate, and robust. The light conveyor belt required much more compact machinery and therefore only a fraction of the space. Consequently, automation in many areas, such as parcel sorting centres or major bakeries, was possible.

Back in 1956, the company had already started to found numerous subsidiaries and affiliates abroad. Early companies to be founded were in the US, Switzerland, Mexico, Japan, Italy, France, Sweden, the Netherlands, Denmark, Australia, Austria and Spain. These were joined later by Canada, China, Malaysia, New Zealand, India, Korea, Belgium, the UK, Slovakia, Slovenia, the Czech Republic, Romania, Hungary, Ireland, Russia, Turkey, Indonesia, Brasil, Chile and Singapore.

In 1971, the world's first production machinery for three-metre wide conveyor belts was purchased. Since 1999, conveyor and processing belts, even up to a width of 4.5 metres, have been made using a calendering process.

Over time, several hundred different belt types with specific characteristics for various industries and applications have been developed. New product groups, such as plastic modular belts and plastic timing belts, gradually turned the company into a full-range supplier of belts. In 1994 the company was bought out by the Swiss corporation Forbo Holding. In 2007, Siegling Belting became Forbo Movement Systems.

== Products ==
- Conveyor belts: Siegling Transilon, Siegling Transtex
- Flat belts: Siegling Extremultus
- Plastic modular belts: Siegling Prolink
- High efficiency timing belts: Siegling Proposition
- Tools and accessories
- Air cooled splicing tools
- Extra products

== Industries & applications ==
- Food industry
- Logistics/airports
- Tobacco industry
- Raw materials
- Textiles industry
- Industrial production
- Paper industry/letter sorting
- Printing industry
- Sports and leisure

== Literature ==
- S. Falkenberg, T. Wennekamp: Doping of conveyor belt materials with nanostructured fillers to adapt innovative performance characteristics. Proceedings of the IEEE International Conference on Automation and Logistics. Qingdao, China, 2008. – ISBN 978-1-4244-2503-7 https://ieeexplore.ieee.org/stamp/stamp.jsp?tp=&arnumber=4636396
