= Wolfgang Reitzle =

German business executive

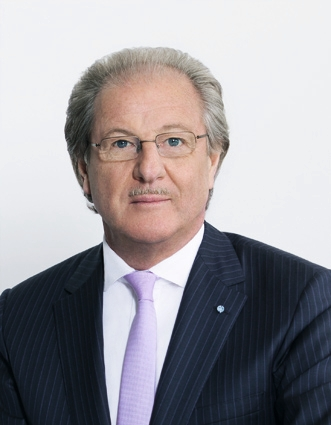
- Reitzle in 2012
- Born: Hans Wolfgang Reitzle; 7 March 1949 (age 77); Neu-Ulm, Germany
- Education: Doctorate in Engineering (Dr.-Ing.)
- Alma mater: Technical University of Munich
- Spouse: Nina Ruge
- Children: Two

Hans Wolfgang Reitzle (born 7 March 1949 in Neu-Ulm) is a German business executive.

== Early life and education ==
After leaving his school in Ulm, Reitzle continued his education at the Technical University of Munich where he studied mechanical engineering and economics. In 1971, aged just 22, he became Munich's youngest ever "Diplom-Ingenieur" graduate. In 1974, he received his doctorate in engineering (Dr.-Ing.).

== Career ==
In 1976, he joined BMW where he would progress to the No. 2 position. He was in charge of product development for more than ten years from 1987, presiding with meticulous attention over the development and launch of a string of successful models.

Between 1999 and 1 May 2002, Reitzle was the head of Ford's Premier Automotive Group, overseeing the Volvo, Jaguar, and Land Rover marques. He let it be known that he left Ford when it became clear that he would not have sufficient control of developing new models through to the production process: the cost containing instincts of fellow director Nick Scheele were destined to ensure that the PAG vehicles would not benefit from his uncompromising approach sufficiently to compete on level terms with market leaders such as Lexus and BMW.

When he left Ford, Reitzle denied having been offered a role with General Motors as heir apparent by Bob Lutz, initially taking over responsibility for Opel and Saab: Ford had provided him with sufficient experience of US auto industry corporate culture. A naval metaphor that he was prepared to place on record was that he "would rather be captain on a destroyer than first officer on an aircraft carrier".

He instead quit the car business and became CEO of The Linde Group, at that time a leading manufacturer of Fork-lift trucks and currently the world's largest industrial gas company, joining the board in 2002 and becoming a chairman in 2003. He was replaced at Ford by Mark Fields, who had previously headed up Mazda.

On 3 May 2016 in Munich, Reitzle was elected as chairman of the supervisory board of Linde AG.

In January 2018 Reitzle was appointed to the supervisory board of the fashion company Bogner. He resigned this post in 2019.

Wolfgang Reitzle has invested in several startups in recent years. For example, he and his wife Nina Ruge together with the billionaire investor Michael Pieper have acquired a stake in the biotech company Tomorrowlabs GmbH. The company, which was founded in 2016 in Vienna by the physician Dominik Duscher and pharmacologist Dominik Thor, is based on the patent-pending HSF ("HIF strengthening factor") active ingredient, which is supposed to promote skin and hair regeneration.

== Other activities ==
=== Corporate boards ===
- Continental AG, Chairman of the Supervisory Board (2009–2026)
- Deutsche Telekom, Member of the Supervisory Board
- Holcim, chairman of the board, Chairman of the Governance & Strategy Committee, Member of the Nomination & Compensation Committee (since 2014)
- KION Group, Member of the Supervisory Board
- Deutsche Bank, Member of the European Advisory Board (since 2003)

=== Non-profit organizations ===
- Deutsches Museum, Member of the Board of Trustees
- Kunsthistorisches Institut in Florenz (KHI), Member of the Board of Trustees
- Munich Security Conference, Chairman of the Advisory Council
- Roland Berger Foundation, Member of the Board of Trustees
- Senckenberg Nature Research Society, Member of the Board of Trustees
- Technical University of Munich (TUM), Member of the Board of Trustees
- Stifterverband für die Deutsche Wissenschaft, Treasurer and Member of the Board of Trustees (2007-2013)

== Personal life ==
Reitzle has two daughters by his first marriage. In September 2001, he married television presenter Nina Ruge.
