= Franke (company) =

Swiss industrial manufacturer

Franke Holding AG
- Type: Limited Company
- Industry: Kitchen systems, food service, industrial engineering
- Founded: 1911
- Headquarters: Aarburg (Aargau), Switzerland
- Key people: Patrik Wohlhauser, CEO Michael Pieper, owner
- Revenue: SFr 2.557 billion (2021)
- Number of employees: 8,130 (2021)
- Website: www.franke.com

Franke Holding AG, based in Aarburg, Switzerland, is an industrial manufacturer with companies located around the world.

Franke has about 8,100 employees working in 63 companies in Europe, South and North America, Africa, Australia and Asia.

In 2021, the Franke Group had a total turnover of CHF 2,557 million."Key figures". Franke Group.

== History ==
=== Founding years ===
Hermann Franke founded a sheet metal business in his name in Rorschach, Switzerland, in 1911. In the late 1920s, the economic upturn in the industry and construction sector led to the incorporation of a sanitary installations department. Franke began with the production of oven tops, skylights and dormer windows.

In the 1930s Franke started production of the first sink units in nickeline, monel-metal and later in stainless steel. Franke built a new factory with offices and residential building, and the company's ten employees relocated to Aarburg, Switzerland. Franke initiated the first production series and the first fully welded, smooth sink unit.

Hermann Franke died on January 25, 1939, and his son Walter took over the business. The Second World War led to great difficulties in obtaining materials. During the years after the war, the company's factory facilities expanded and the production of complete kitchens began. Franke started to export products to European countries.

=== Expansion years ===
The construction sector developed encouragingly. Business expanded rapidly. Franke sold kitchen sinks. In 1950 the Washroom and Sanitary Equipment product group was established as part of Franke with products for communal washrooms and WCs. Production of components for propulsion systems began. Franke saw its first foreign investment in Germany and by 1955 had 500 employees.

In the late 1950s, Franke's production doubled. Factory facilities were expanded further. A "Commercial Kitchens" division was founded. By 1961 Franke had 750 employees.

Over the next twelve years, Franke experienced rapid growth: 13 new subsidiaries were established and two companies began manufacturing under license. In 1972, Franke built and installed the first kitchen for McDonald's in Munich. By 1974 the company had 2,600 employees. In 1975 Franke ownership changes: Walter Franke's friend and business partner Willi Pieper took over. Four subsidiaries and two licensees were added to the group. In 1979 the Franke compact sink system was introduced. In the late 1980s the divisional organization was established.

=== Today ===
Michael Pieper joined Group Management in 1989. Rapid and consistent expansion transformed Franke into a corporate group with worldwide operations. Today Franke consists of approx. 8,500 employees in over 70 companies in Europe, South America, North America, Africa, Australia and Asia.

=== Franke companies ===
==== Switzerland ====
Franke Artemis Group has its headquarters in Aarburg/Switzerland.

==== United Kingdom ====
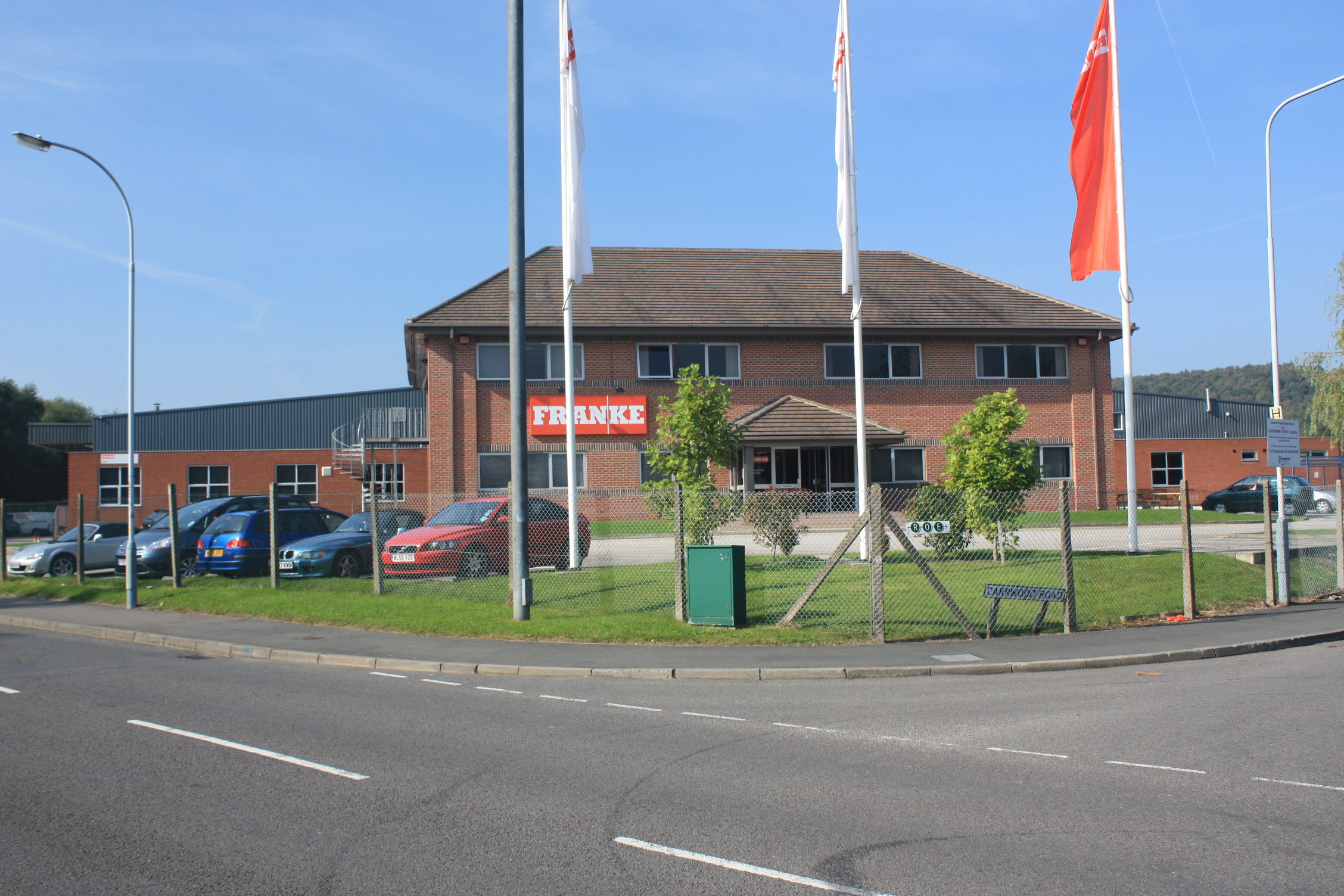
Franke Sissons Ltd Head office at Chesterfield, Derbyshire, UK

Franke took over the Sissons company based in Chesterfield, who are a manufacturer of stainless steel catering sinks and washroom systems. Sissons were one of the first companies to manufacture stainless steel sinks in the 1930s, and were founded in Sheffield, England. The company is known as Franke Sissons Ltd. In 1990, it bought the Falkirk-based Carron Phoenix.

Franke Coffee Systems UK are based in St Albans, Hertfordshire and sell and service bean-to-cup, pod and traditional style coffee machines.

==== France ====
The company has also bought the companies Blinox and Roblin (producing hoods).

United States

Franke Foodservice Systems Americas, Inc. is based in Smyrna, Tennessee, in an office and warehousing facility located near the Smyrna Municipal Airport and a factory in Fayetteville, Tennessee. The company was established in the 1970s with the purchase of a stainless steel manufacturer in the Philadelphia, Pennsylvania metro area. The company moved operations to Tennessee in 1998. The business was divided into two sister companies, Franke Foodservice Solutions and Franke Foodservice Supply, in 2016, before being merged back together into a single entity (Franke Foodservice Systems Americas) in 2019.

The Americas division is focused on the manufacture and sale of custom stainless steel heated and refrigerated equipment for quick-service restaurant chains.

==== Franke Home Solutions ====
In January 2026, Corrado Mura succeeded Barbara Borra as president and chief executive officer of Franke Home Solutions, following Borra’s retirement after seven years in the role. Mura, who had previously served as vice president for the EMEA region, assumed leadership of the division as part of an internal succession announced by the Franke Group in November 2025.

In January 2026, it was announced Franke had acquired the Norwegian kitchen hood manufacturer, Røros Metall for an undisclosed sum. The acquisition placed Røros Metall within Franke’s Home Solutions division and expanded the group’s operations and manufacturing presence in the Nordic region.
