= Michael Pieper =

Swiss businessman (born 1946)

- Born: 1946 (age 79–80)
- Education: University of St. Gallen
- Occupation: Businessman
- Known for: CEO and owner, Artemis Group and Franke
- Children: 2

Michael Pieper (born 1946) is a Swiss billionaire businessman. He is the owner of the kitchen appliance manufacturer Franke through his holding company, Artemis Group. As of August 2026, his net worth was estimated at US$4.8 billion.

== Early life ==
Pieper was born in 1946. He studied economics at the University of St. Gallen.

== Career ==
Pieper is the owner of Artemis Group, which controls Franke, bought by his father Will Pieper in 1975. Pieper took over as CEO of Franke in 1989. Franke is a supplier of products for kitchens, the hygiene sector and coffee preparation. Pieper stepped down in 2012 as CEO of the Franke Group. The group of companies employs around 9,000 people and generated sales of 2.076 billion Swiss francs in 2017. The owner Michael Pieper is number 804 on the Forbes list and is therefore also one of the 10 richest Swiss. Pieper's assets are estimated at CHF 3.5 to 4 billion.

In addition to a large real estate portfolio, the Artemis Group also includes investments in Swiss industrial companies. Artemis for example also owns a controlling interest in precision cutting technology company Feintool and teak plantations in Costa Rica and Nicaragua. Pieper serves on the boards of several companies, including construction manufacturer Forbo and vehicle component manufacturer Autoneum.

While machinery and industry were primarily his profession, the President of the Artemis Group, is recently breaking new ground with several startup investments. For this reason he joined the startup fund Wingman Ventures in 2019 with a high single-digit million amount. In 2020 he further acquired a 10% stake in the biotech startup company Tomorrowlabs GmbH alongside fellow investor and former Linde CEO Wolfgang Reitzle. The company was founded in Vienna in 2016 by the physician Dominik Duscher and the pharmacologist Dominik Thor on basis of the patent-pending HSF ("HIF strengthening factor") active ingredient intended to regenerate skin and hair.

== Personal life ==
Pieper is married and lives in Lucerne, Switzerland. Pieper's two children are involved in the Franke group and sit on the board of directors of Artemis Holding.
