= Autoneum =

Swiss automotive supplier

- Company type: Public company AG
- ISIN: CH0127480363
- Industry: Automotive
- Founded: May 13, 1901
- Headquarters: Winterthur, Switzerland
- Key people: Eelco Spoelder (CEO); Bernhard Wiehl; Daniel Bentele; Fausto Bigi; Andreas Kolf; Denis Albert; Hans-Peter Schwald (Chairman of the Board of Directors)
- Products: Automotive interior and exterior sound and thermal insulations
- Revenue: 2.29 billion (2025)
- Number of employees: 16,400 (December 31, 2025)
- Website: www.autoneum.com

Autoneum (legal name Autoneum Holding AG) is an internationally active Swiss automotive supplier headquartered in Winterthur, Switzerland. Autoneum is one of the leading manufacturers in vehicle acoustic and thermal insulation for vehicles and supplies the majority of global automobile manufacturers.

Autoneum was founded in 2011 as a spin-off of Rieter Holding AG. As of December 31, 2025, Autoneum operates more than 70 production facilities and employs 16,400 people worldwide. Autoneum Holding AG is listed on the SIX Swiss Exchange.

== History ==
In 1984, machine factory Rieter took over Unikeller AG, a manufacturer of noise control and thermal insulation systems for vehicles, thus laying the foundation stone for Autoneum. Unikeller AG became a fully owned subsidiary of Rieter Holding AG.

This was followed in 1988 by the acquisition of the CHG Group in Rossdorf-Gundernhausen, Germany, AGFK in Sevelen, Switzerland and Sipavel in Setúbal, Portugal.

In 1994, Firth Furnishings UK, a producer of vehicle carpets, was taken over, and one year later, in 1995, vehicle component manufacturer Globe Industries, USA. Together with this acquisition Rieter also took on UGN, a joint venture of Globe Industries with Japanese automotive supplier Nihon Tokushu Toryo (Nittoku). The Unikeller division was renamed Rieter Automotive Systems in the same year.

The last vehicle component manufacturers from Italy and Brazil were purchased in 1996/97 and a joint venture was launched with Magee Carpet Company in the USA.

A further joint venture with Nittoku was created in China in 2003 and a Development and Acoustic Center was opened in 2008 in Shanghai, China.

The board of directors decided to split the Rieter Group in March 2011. The Rieter Automotive Systems division was spun off in May 2011 and entered as a stock-listed automotive supplier under the name Autoneum.

In 2012, Autoneum and the Japanese automotive suppliers Nittoku and Toyota Boshoku agreed to collaborate in the development of interior systems for hybrid vehicles.

In 2013, Autoneum opened a plant in the Russian city of Ryazan. As part of a move to adjust production capacities to the decline in demand on the European market, the subsidiary Autoneum Italy with plants in Desio, Pignataro, Santhià and Vicolungo was sold in the same year. It was also in 2013 that Autoneum engaged in a joint venture with its long-standing partner Nittoku and Chinese supplier TGPM Automotive Industry Group (TGPM). The joint venture company Wuhan Nittoku Autoneum Sound-Proof operates a production site in the Chinese city of Wuhan for the manufacture of thermal and acoustic management components.

Autoneum established a further joint venture in 2014 with Korean automotive supplier SH Global. Autoneum Korea Ltd. has its registered office in Incheon, South Korea.

In June 2015, the German Federal Cartel Office imposed fines totaling 75 million euros on five automotive suppliers, including the German subsidiary of Autoneum due to illegal price fixing in the period from 2005 to 2013. Autoneum paid a fine of 29.5 million euros.

A new Autoneum plant commenced operations in 2016 in the Mexican city of San Luis Potosí. Together with the production facilities in Hermosillo and Silao (site of subsidiary UGN), the company therefore has three plants in Mexico and a sales and engineering office in Mexico City.

Autoneum founded its “Competence Center New Mobility” in the Californian city of Sunnyvale, USA, in 2017, where among other things acoustics and thermal management components for electric vehicles are being developed. In the same year, the company opened its new North America Headquarters in Novi (Michigan), USA. Also in 2017, Autoneum expanded the existing collaboration with Nittoku and Toyota Boshoku with the foundation of a joint venture for research and development in vehicle acoustics.

With new plants in Yantai, Changsha, Pinghu and Shenyang Tiexi, the automotive supplier expanded its production capacities in China in 2017 and 2018 to a total of ten locations. Autoneum opened a further production facility in Komárom, Hungary, in 2018. The plant manufactures lightweight components for acoustic and thermal management and is the company’s sixth Eastern European production site. Production also started in the same year at a second plant in San Luis Potosí so that Autoneum is now represented with a total of five locations in Mexico.

In January 2023, Autoneum announced the acquisition of the Borgers automotive business. The acquisition was completed successfully following the submission of all antitrust approvals with effect as of April 1, 2023. With the acquisition of the German company, Autoneum has further expanded its global market leadership in sustainable acoustic and thermal management for vehicles.

In March 2024, Autoneum announced the expansion of its production capacities in the Asian growth markets China and India with two new plants in the Chinese province of Jilin and Pune in Western India.

== Products ==
Autoneum develops and produces lightweight components for acoustic and thermal management for vehicles. These include engine encapsulations, carpet systems and inner dashes for the passenger compartment, underbody systems, wheelhouse outer liners and heatshields as well as dampers.
