= Forbo Holding AG =

Swiss manufacturing company

- Company type: Stock corporation
- ISIN: CH0003541510
- Industry: plastics and rubber industry
- Founded: 1928
- Headquarters: Baar ZG, Switzerland
- Key people: Johannes Huber (Chief Executive Officer (CEO)); Bernhard Merki (Executive Chairman of the Board of Directors)
- Products: Floor coverings and power transmission/light conveyor belts
- Revenue: 1,085.4 million CHF (2025)
- Number of employees: 5,050 (December 31, 2025)
- Website: www.forbo.com

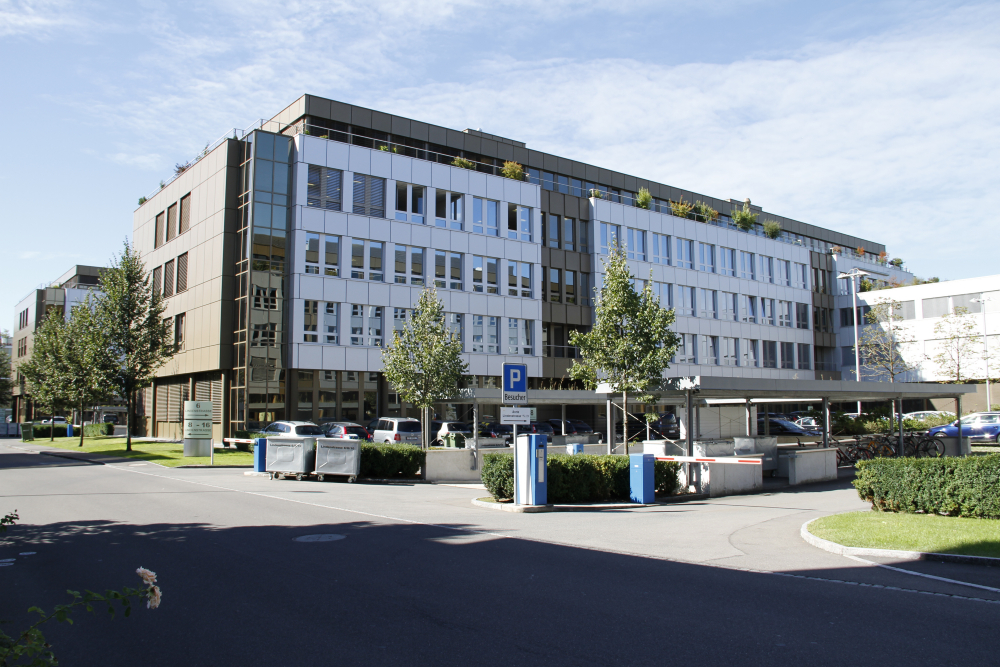
Forbo Holding AG has its headquarters in Baar in the canton Zug, Switzerland.

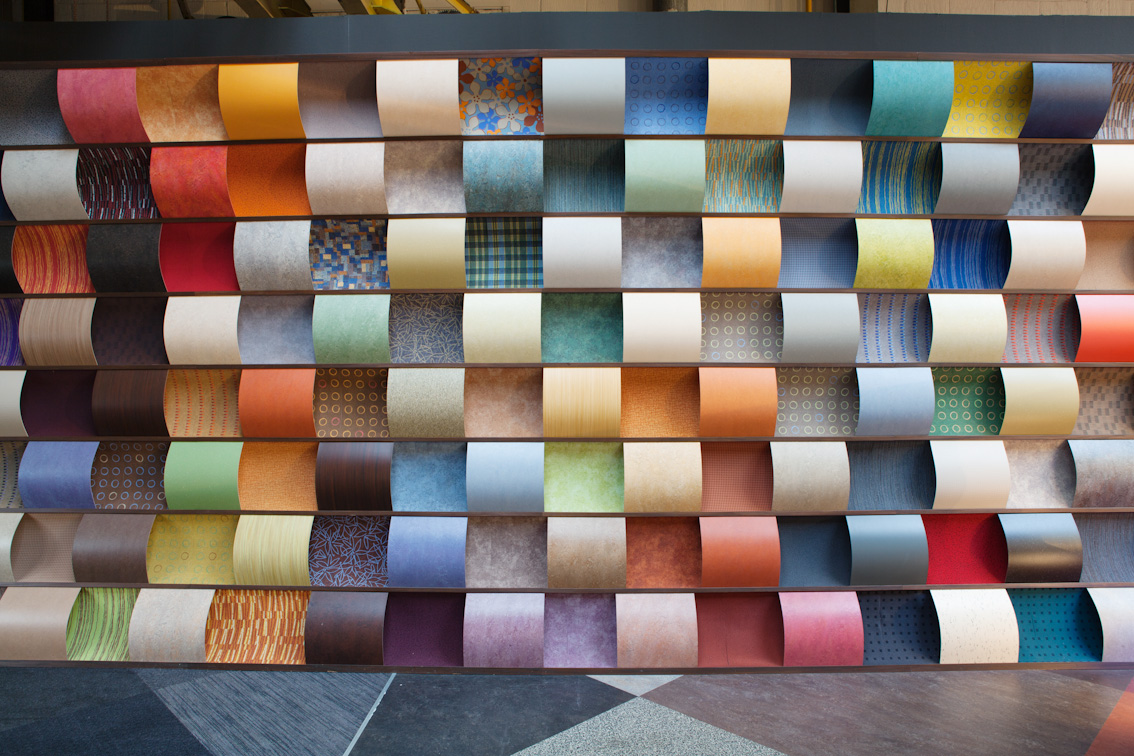
Forbo Flooring Systems offers a broad range of floor coverings and building and construction adhesives.

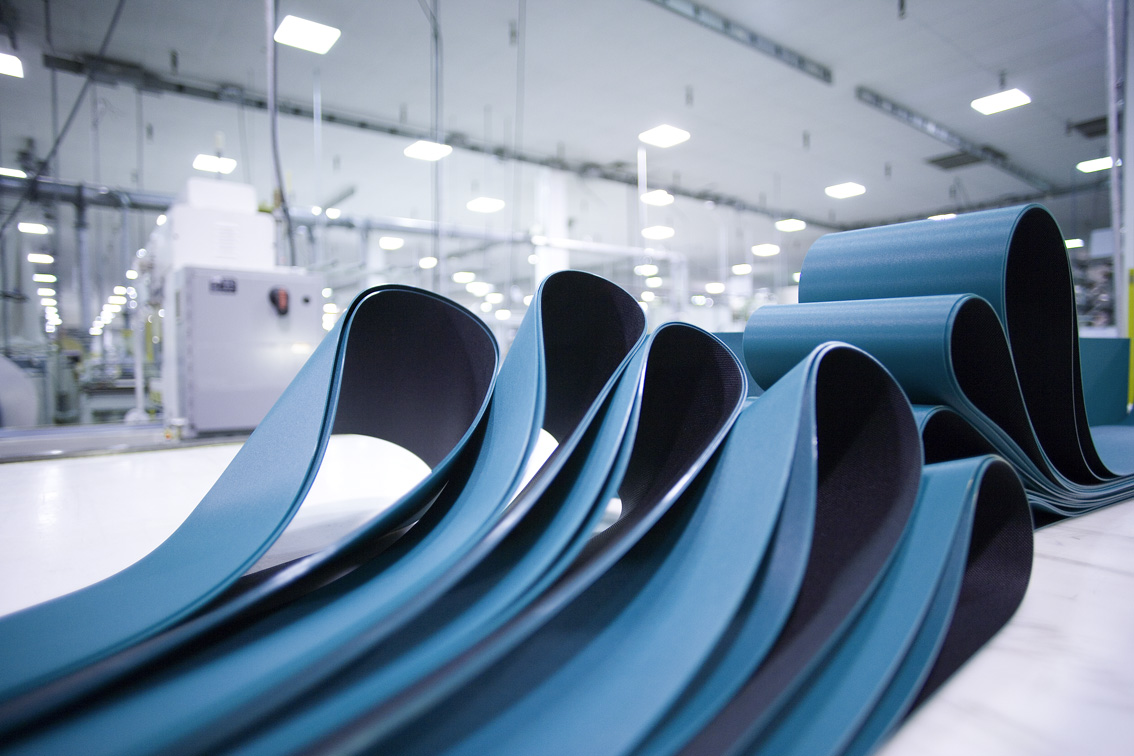
Forbo Movement Systems is specialized in power transmission and light conveyor belts.

Forbo Holding AG based in Baar ZG is a globally operating Swiss manufacturer of floor coverings and building and construction adhesives as well as power transmission and light conveyor belts.

The group has an international network of 25 locations with production and sales, as well as 49 pure sales organizations in a total of 39 countries. Forbo has around 5,050 employees and achieved a turnover in 2025 of 1,085.4 million Swiss francs. The company is listed on the SWX Swiss stock exchange (SIX: CH0003541510CHF4).

== Areas of activity ==
Forbo has two divisions: Forbo Flooring Systems and Forbo Movement Systems.

The Flooring Systems division is specialized in linoleum, vinyl floor coverings, entrance matting systems, carpet tiles, needle felt coverings and Flotex. These are used, among other things, in public buildings, hospitals, schools, business premises and in the home. Forbo is the worldwide market leader in linoleum. Forbo sells the material under the trademarked name of Marmoleum. Under the brand name Eurocol, Flooring Systems also offers ready-to-use adhesives for laying floor coverings and ceramic tiles, as well as filling and leveling compounds for the construction industry.

Movement Systems is specialized in power transmission belts, transport and process belts, plastic modular belts as well as toothed and flat belts of synthetic materials. The products are sold under the brand name of Siegling and are used in a wide range of areas in industrial, trade and services companies, for example as process belts in the food industry, as treadmill belts in fitness studios or as flat belts in mail distribution systems.

== History ==
Forbo was founded in 1928 by a merger of three linoleum manufacturers in Germany (Deutsche Linoleum-Werke A.G., Berlin), Sweden (Linoleum Aktiebolaget Forshaga) and Switzerland (Linoleum AG Giubiasco) under the company name of Continentale Linoleum Union. According to the company's own information, at the time it represented "80 % of linoleum production in continental Europe." In the following year the group was joined by the Nederlandsche Linoleumfabriek (Netherlands), and later by other companies from Austria, France and Latvia. Towards the end of the 1930s, the DLW left the union due to political circumstances.

From the 1950s on, the company began to diversify its business activities into other areas such as carpets and vinyl floor coverings. At the start of the 1970s, the adhesives area was separated from the linoleum business and continued independently. At the same time, the name of the company was changed from Continentale Linoleum Union to Forbo. In the subsequent two decades, Forbo grew to become a global concern, working on all five continents. The company made various acquisitions and extended its business activities to the areas of wall coverings and high-pressure laminates.

In 1994 Forbo took over Siegling, a company specialized in power transmission and light conveyor belts based in Hanover, Germany. In the second half of the 1990s, the areas wall coverings and laminates were phased out.

In 2000 the group realigned itself strategically in the four areas of linoleum, vinyl, synthetic belts and adhesives, and then made several smaller acquisitions to reinforce its adhesives business. The industrial areas, including extrusion profiles, decoration products and coated textiles, were phased out, while the carpet activity was sold in a management buy-out.

In the first half of the 2000s, the adhesives activity was further extended internationally by the takeover of the company Swift with operations in the US, Europe and Asia. The plastic belts division was also extended in Great Britain. The linoleum and vinyl activities were fused with Forbo Flooring, and at the same time the three strategic divisions of floor coverings, adhesives and plastic belts were formed. Production takes place at two locations in Krommenie (Netherlands) and Kirkcaldy (Scotland).

2006: takeover of Victa Technologies, a Chinese adhesives manufacturers specializing in hotmelt adhesives and water-based adhesives.

2007: new branding and growth strategy; the three core divisions are renamed Flooring Systems, Bonding Systems and Movement Systems, and pursue an integrated corporate strategy under the umbrella brand Forbo.

In 2012 there is a concentration on the market leading market positions Flooring Systems and Movement Systems. The activities of Bonding Systems with the industrial adhesives (including synthetic polymers) are sold off. Building and construction adhesives are continued as a separate unit within the division Flooring Systems.
