= Murata Machinery =

Japanese industrial machinery company

Murata Machinery, Ltd.
- Native name: 村田機械株式会社
- Company type: Private KK
- Industry: Machinery
- Founded: July 1935; 90 years ago
- Headquarters: Fushimi-ku, Kyoto, Japan
- Area served: Worldwide
- Key people: Daisuke Murata (President)
- Products: Textile machinery; CNC Turning machine with auto loader; Sheet metal machinery with auto loader; Automated guided vehicles; Clean FA systems; Communication equipment
- Revenue: JPY 253 billion (FY 2017) (US$ 17 billion) (FY 2017)
- Net income: JPY 17.1 billion (FY 2017) (US$ 162 million) (FY 2017)
- Number of employees: 6,950 (consolidated, as of March 31, 2018)
- Website: Official website

Murata Machinery, Ltd. (村田機械株式会社, Murata Kikai Kabushiki-gaisha), abbrev. MML, is a privately held Japanese international company founded in 1935 with its head office at Fushimi-ku, Kyoto

The company's main products are industrial machines such as textile machinery, turning machines, sheet metal machinery and communication equipment like digital multifunctional products. In addition, Murata Machinery provides factory automation and logistics systems centering on the automated storage and automated transportation systems, and also automated material handling systems for clean rooms designed for semiconductor fabs.

== History ==
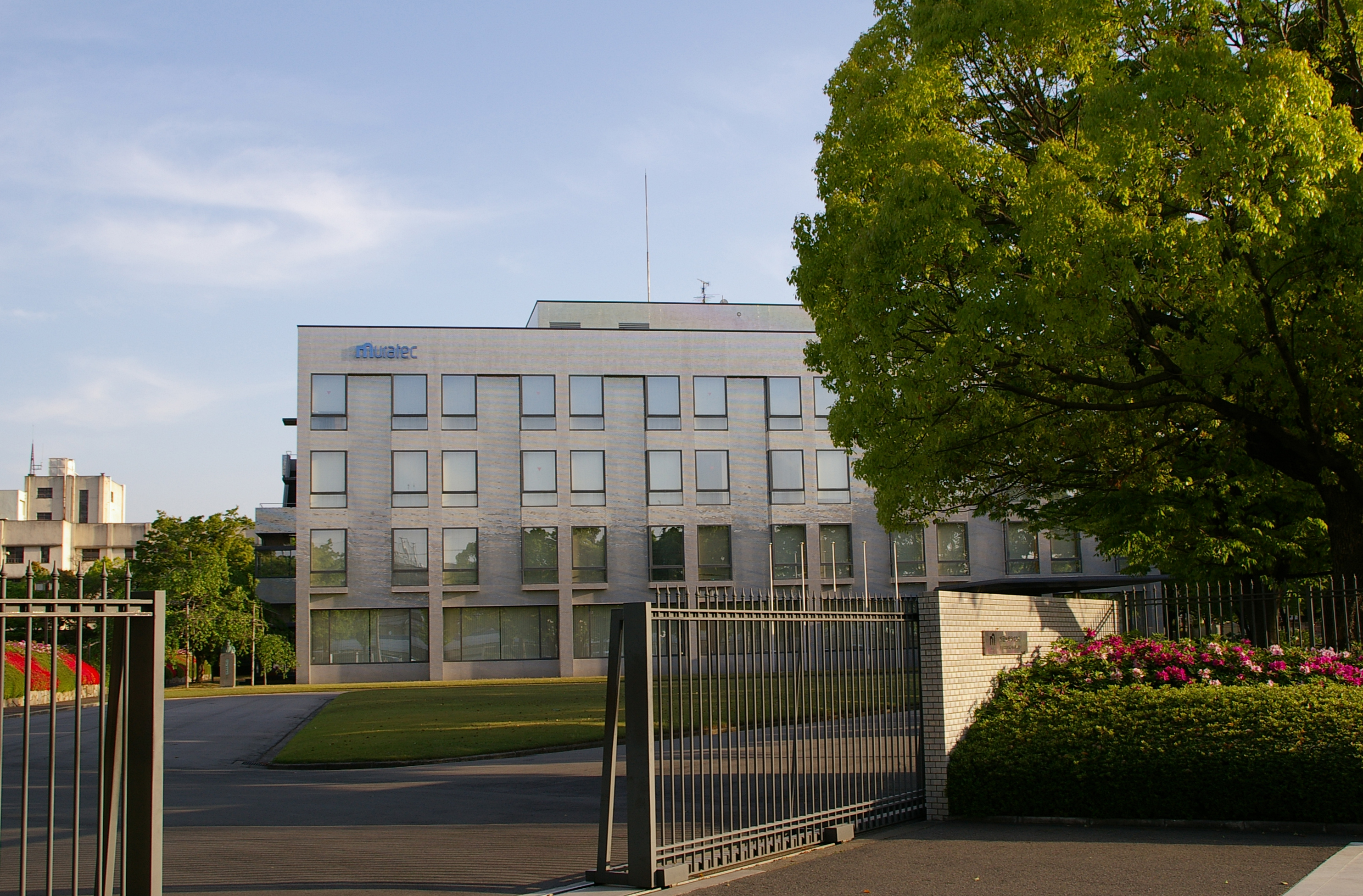
Headquarters of Murata Machinery in Fushimi-ku, Kyoto, Japan

Nishijin Jacquard Mfg., the predecessor of Murata Machinery, Ltd. was founded in 1935 and mainly developed the business of textile machinery. Nishijin Jacquart expanded into the machine tools industries in 1961, and automated systems in 1962. At that time, the company name was changed to the present Murata Machinery, Ltd. In 1970, Murata Machinery began selling facsimile machines in Japan.

In 1970, Murata Machinery's textile machinery division, developed the "Mach Splicer" device which can join yarn using air flow without knot. The Automatic Winders equipped with the Mach Splicer started to be delivered to worldwide factories and still remain the core products of this company. The synthetic fiber machine business was transferred to TMT Machinery, Inc., which was jointly funded in 2002 by the three leading manufacturers of synthetic fiber machinery in Japan that merged their synthetic textile machinery business units; Toray Engineering, Murata Machinery and Teijin Seiki (present Nabtesco).

Murata established its U.S.-based subsidiary, Murata Machinery USA in 1974. The company entered the U.S. market in 1982 as Murata Business Systems to sell fax machines through private-label agreements with multiple U.S. companies. In January, 1985, the company began marketing its facsimile products under the Murata name from its corporate headquarters in Dallas, Texas.

In 1991, Murata Machinery company-wide introduced the new unified brand name, "MURATEC".

In August 2009, the wholly owned subsidiary, Muratec Automation Co. Ltd., was established when Murata Machinery split the business unit for Automated Material Handling Systems for Semiconductor and FPD and acquired Asyst Technology Japan and then integrated these business units. In 2012, Muratec Automation was merged into Murata Machinery Ltd. and the Clean FA Division was established.

In 2011, Silex Technology, specializing in network and wireless technology, became a wholly owned subsidiary of Murata Machinery.

In October 2014, Murata Machinery acquired 100% ownership of Cimcorp Oy of Finland, the top supplier for intralogistics in the tire industry and for retail and distribution customers.
