= Spinning (textiles) =

Method of turning fiber into yarn or thread

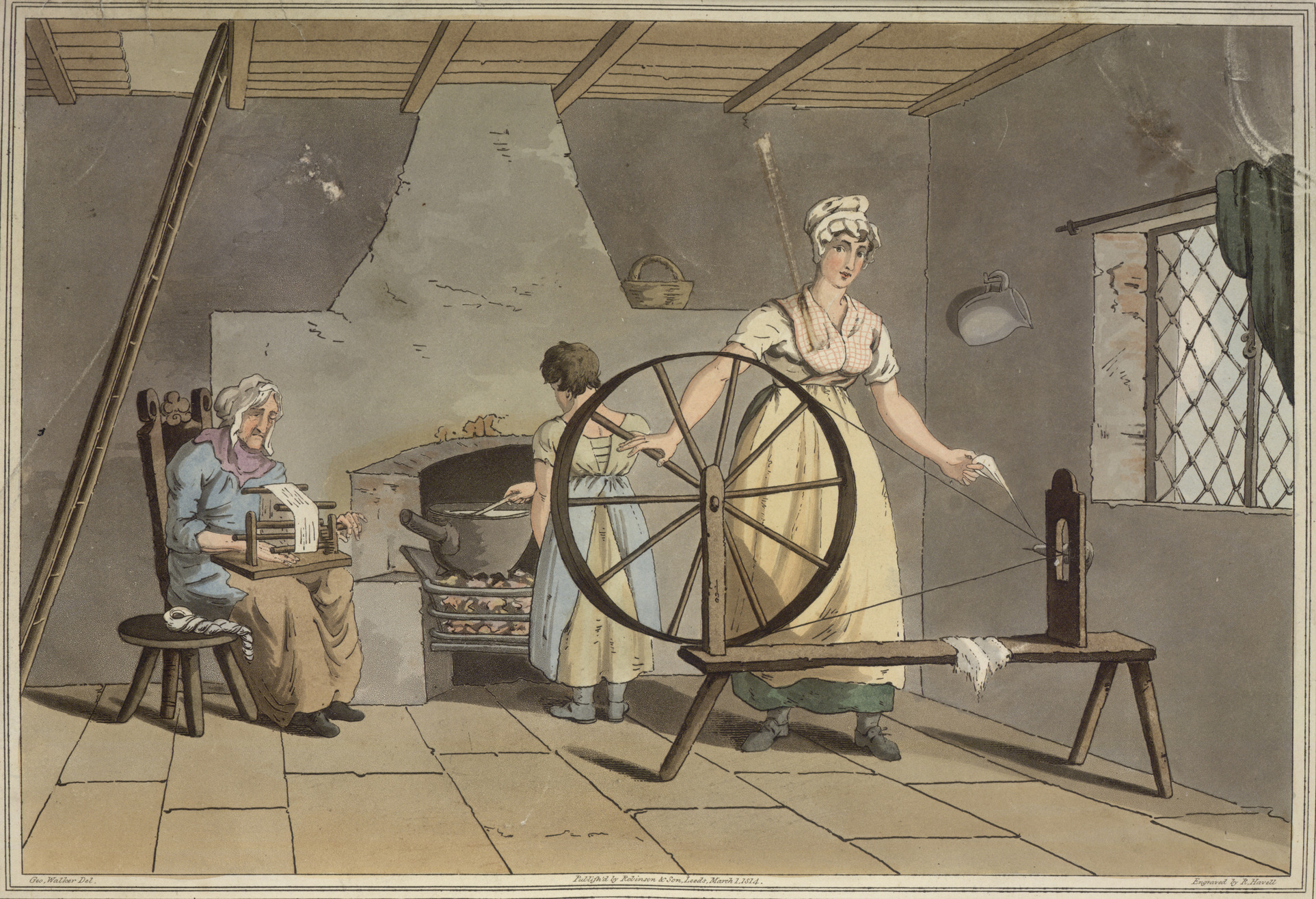
George Walker, 1814

Spinning is a twisting technique to form yarn from fibers. The fiber intended is drawn out, twisted, and wound onto a bobbin. The fibers that are commonly spun into yarn are cotton, viscose, animal fibers such as wool, and synthetic polyester. Originally done by hand using a spindle whorl, starting in the 500s AD the spinning wheel became the predominant spinning tool across Asia and Europe. The spinning jenny and spinning mule, invented in the late 1700s, made mechanical spinning far more efficient than spinning by hand, and especially made cotton manufacturing one of the most important industries of the Industrial Revolution.

== Process ==
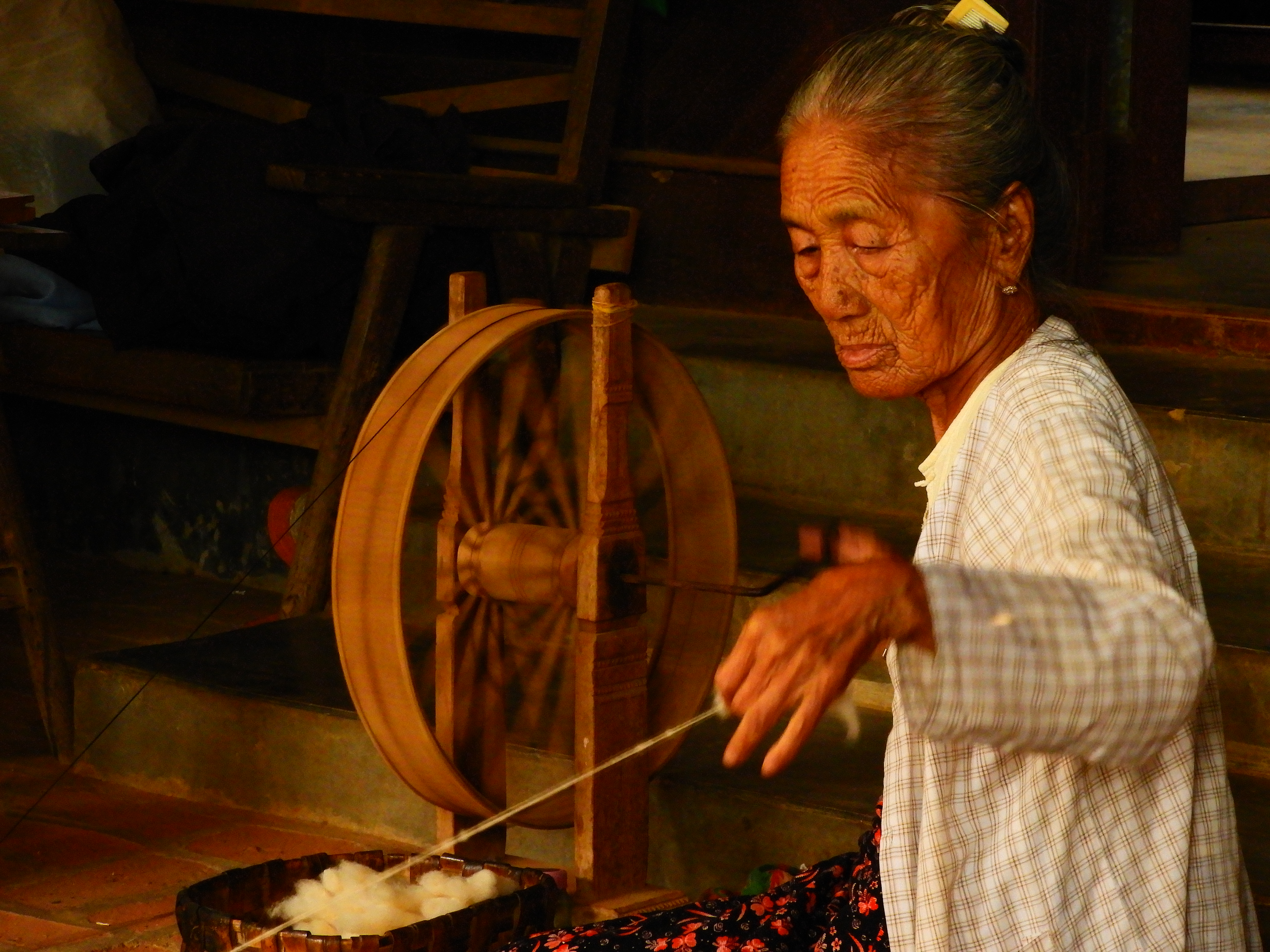
Traditional spinner in her family's house in Old Bagan, Myanmar (2019)

The yarn issuing from the drafting rollers passes through a thread-guide, round a traveller that is free to rotate around a ring, and then onto a tube or bobbin, which is carried on to a spindle, the axis of which passes through a center of the ring. The spindle is driven (usually at an angular velocity that is either constant or changes only slowly), and the traveller is dragged around a ring by the loop of yarn passing round it. If the drafting rollers were stationary, the angular velocity of the traveller would be the same as that of the spindle, and each revolution of the spindle would cause one turn of a twist to be inserted in the loop of yarn between the roller nip and the traveller. In spinning, however, the yarn is continually issuing from the rollers of the drafting system and, under these circumstances, the angular velocity of the traveller is less than that of the spindle by an amount that is just sufficient to allow the yarn to be wound onto the bobbin at the same rate as that at which it issues from the drafting rollers.

Each revolution of the traveller now inserts one turn of twist into the loop of yarn between the roller nip and the traveller but, in equilibrium, the number of turns of twist in the loop of yarn remains constant as the twisted yarn is passing through the traveller at a corresponding rate.

== Types of fibre ==
Artificial fibres are made by extruding a polymer through a spinneret into a medium where it hardens. Wet spinning (rayon) uses a coagulating medium. In dry spinning (acetate and triacetate), the polymer is contained in a solvent that evaporates in the heated exit chamber. In melt spinning (nylons and polyesters) the extruded polymer is cooled in gas or air and sets. All these fibres will be of great length, often kilometers long.

Natural fibres can be divided into three categories: animals (sheep, goat, rabbit, silkworm), minerals (asbestos, gold, silver), or plants (cotton, flax, sisal). These vegetable fibres can come from the seed (cotton), the stem (known as bast fibres: they include flax, hemp, and jute) or the leaf (sisal). Many processes are needed before a clean even staple is obtained. With the exception of silk, each of these fibres is short, only centimetres in length, and each has a rough surface that enables it to bond with similar staples.

Artificial fibres can be processed as long fibres or batched and cut so they can be processed like a natural fibre.

== Methods ==
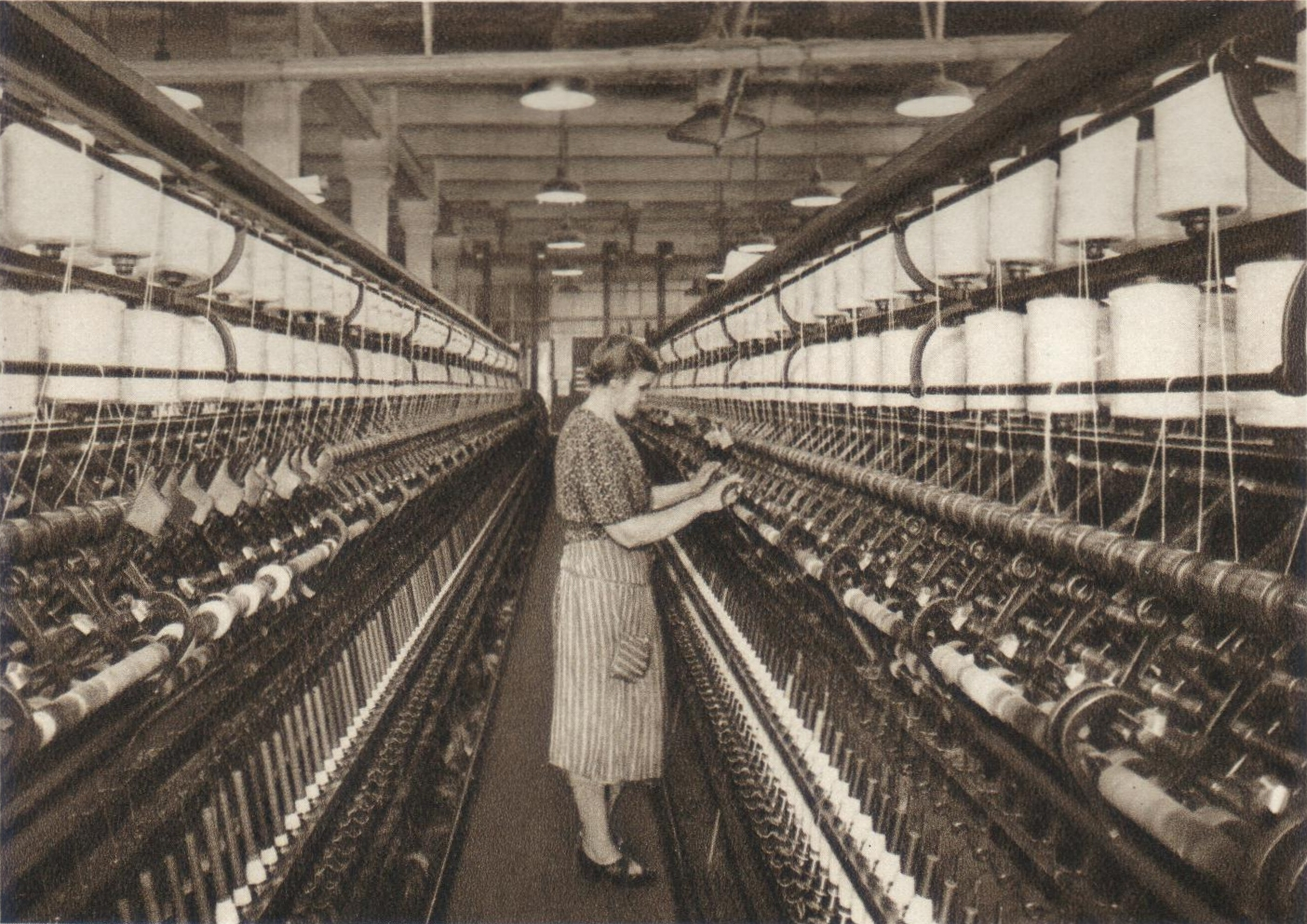
Ring spinning

Ring spinning is one of the most common spinning methods in the world. Other systems include air-jet and open-end spinning, a technique where the staple fiber is blown by air into a rotor and attaches to the tail of formed yarn that is continually being drawn out of the chamber. Other methods of break spinning use needles and electrostatic forces.

The processes to make short-staple yarn (typically spun from fibers from 1.9 to 5.1 centimetres (0.75 to 2.0 in)) are blending, opening, carding, pin-drafting, roving, spinning, and—if desired—plying and dyeing. In long staple spinning, the process may start with stretch-break of tow, a continuous "rope" of synthetic fiber. In open-end and air-jet spinning, the roving operation is eliminated. The spinning frame winds yarn around a bobbin. Generally, after this step the yarn is wound to a cone for knitting or weaving.

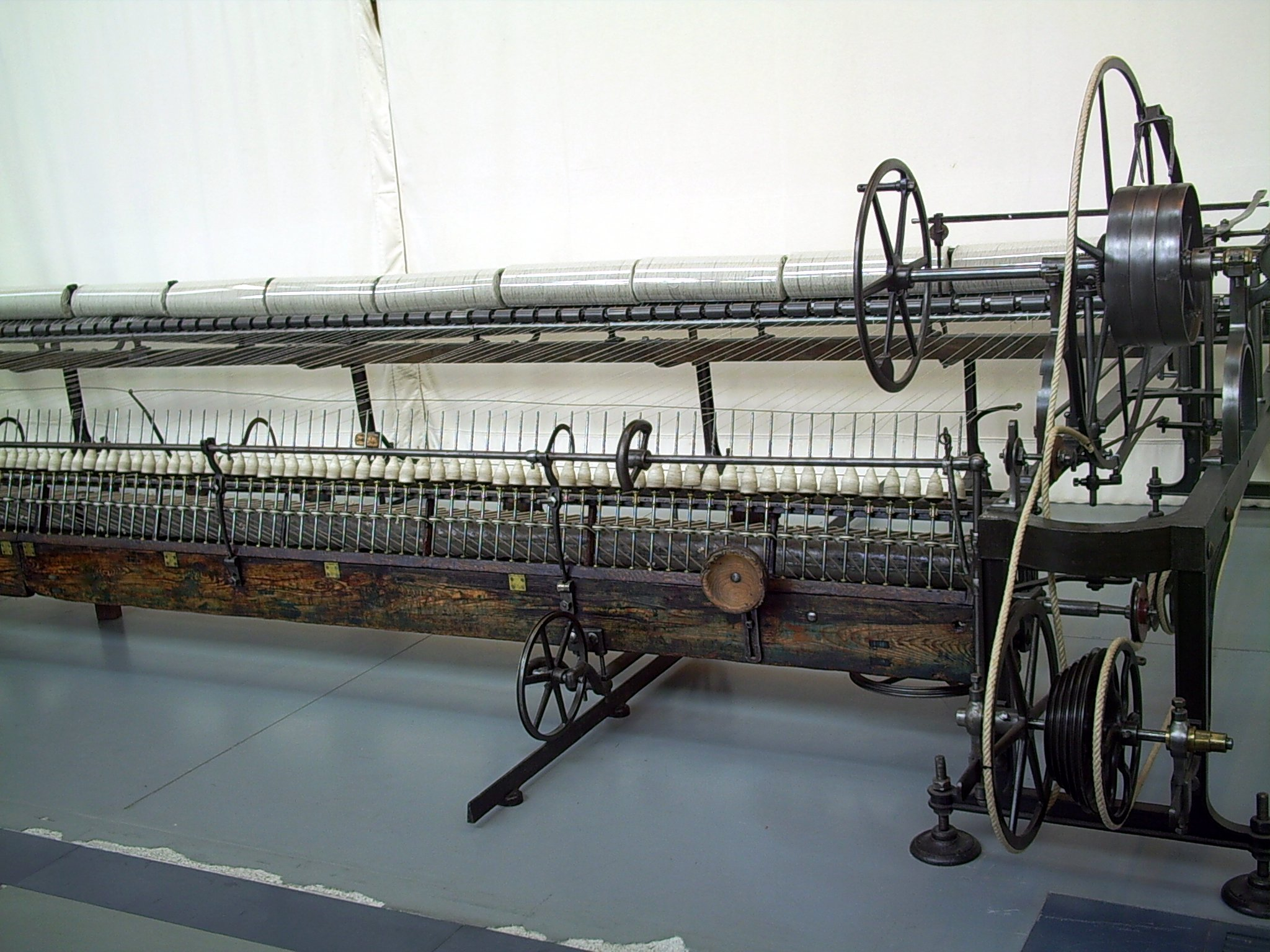
Mule spinning

In a spinning mule, the roving is pulled off bobbins and sequentially fed through rollers operating at several different speeds, thinning the roving at a consistent rate. The yarn is twisted through the spinning of the bobbin as the carriage moves out, and is rolled onto a cop as the carriage returns. Mule spinning produces a finer thread than ring spinning. Spinning by the mule machine is an intermittent process as the frame advances and returns. It is the descendant of a device invented in 1779 by Samuel Crompton, and produces a softer, less twisted thread that is favored for fines and for weft.

The ring was a descendant of the Arkwright water frame of 1769 and creates yarn in a continuous process. The yarn is coarser, has a greater twist, and is stronger, making it more suitable for warp. Ring spinning is slow due to the distance the thread must pass around the ring. Similar methods have improved on this including flyer and bobbin and cap spinning.

The pre-industrial techniques of hand spinning with a spindle or spinning wheel continue to be practiced as handicraft or hobby and enable wool or unusual vegetable and animal staples to be used.

== History and economics ==
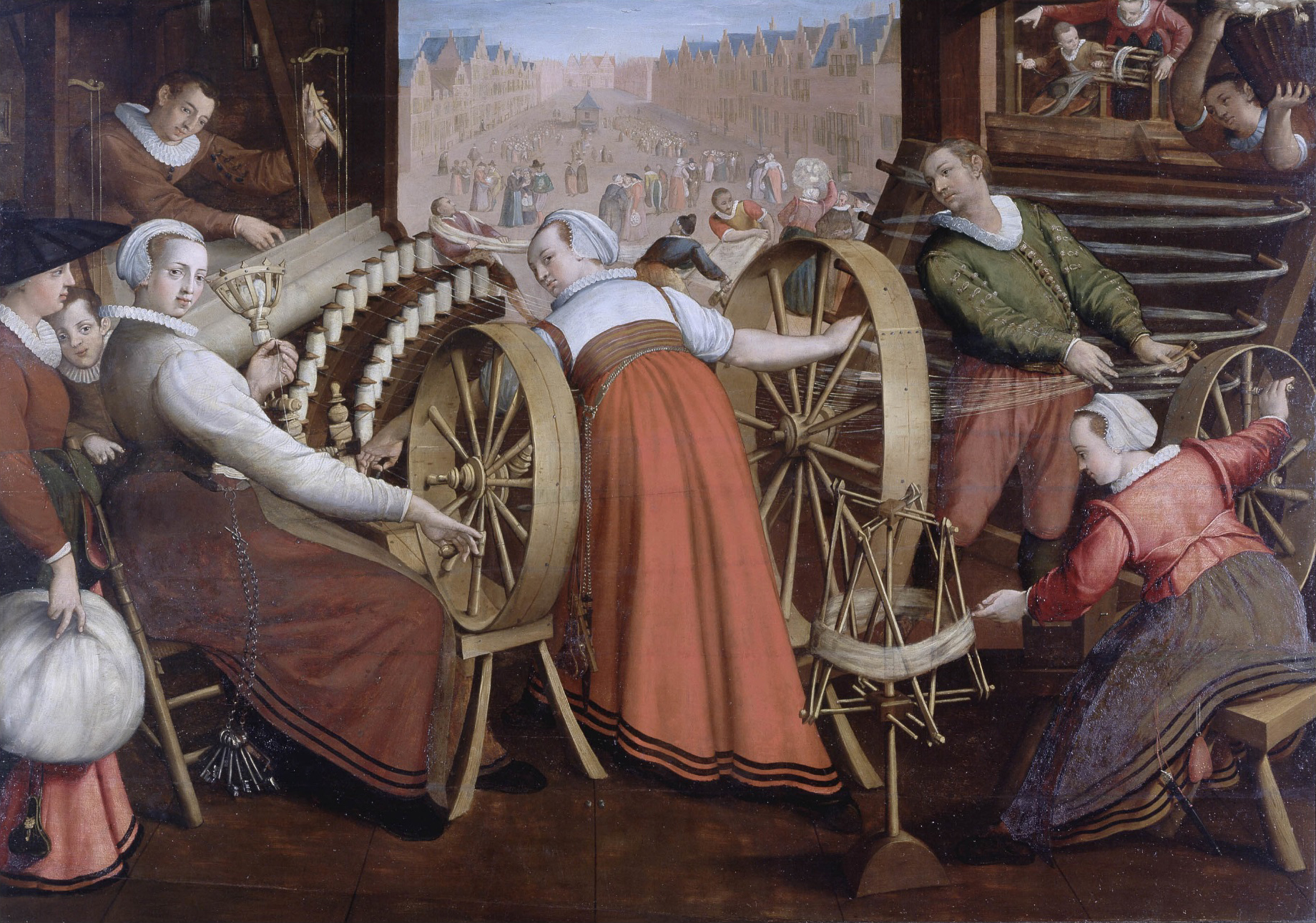
1595 painting illustrating Leiden textile workers

The origins of hand spinning fibers is unknown, but is believed to have originated separately in several cultures around the world long before the common era. The oldest known twisted fiber was found in southern France, and archaeologists believe it was created around 50,000–40,000 BC. People are thought to have originally twisted fibers together by rolling them up the thigh or between the fingers, although soon a stick was used to maintain tension and hold the twist in the fibers.

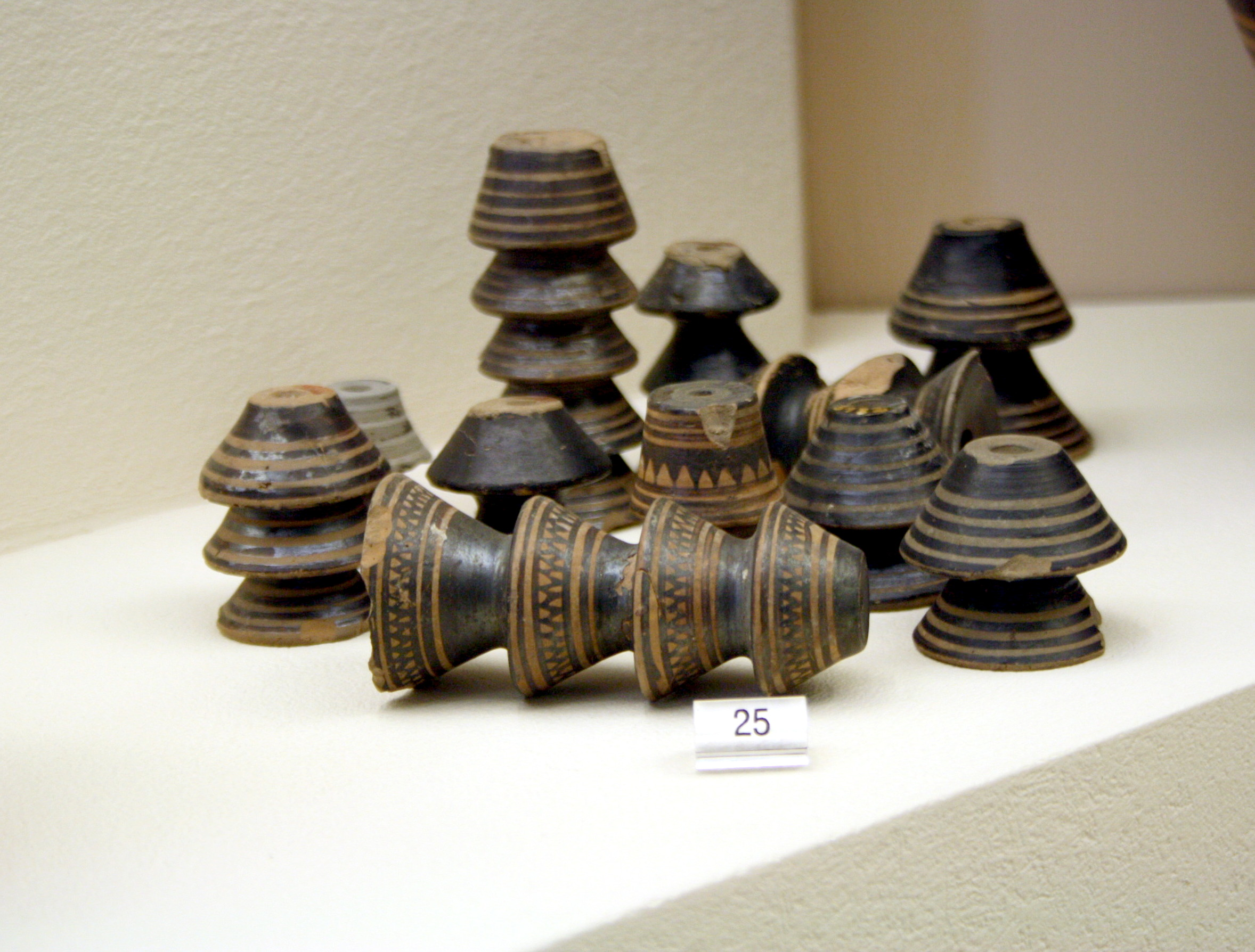
Ancient Greek spindle whorls, 10th century BC, Kerameikos Archaeological Museum, Athens

People eventually discovered that adding a weight to the stick, often made of stone, wood, or clay and known as a whorl, helped to maintain momentum and left the hands free to draft the fiber. Whorl spindles are still the predominant method of spinning fiber in some parts of the world.

The cultivation of cotton as well as the knowledge of its spinning and weaving in Meroë reached a high level around the 4th century BC. The export of textiles was one of the sources of wealth for Meroë. Hand spinning was an important cottage industry in medieval Europe, where the wool spinners (most often women and children) would provide enough yarn to service the needs of the men who operated the looms or to sell on in the putting-out system.

=== Spinning Jenny ===
Spinning jenny

After the invention of the spinning jenny water frame the demand was greatly reduced by mechanization. Its technology was specialized and costly and employed water as motive power. Spinning and weaving as cottage industries were displaced by dedicated manufactories, developed by industrialists and their investors; the spinning and weaving industries, once widespread, were concentrated where the sources of water, raw materials, and manpower were most readily available, particularly West Yorkshire. The British government was very protective of the technology and restricted its export. After World War I the colonies where the cotton was grown started to purchase and manufacture significant quantities of cotton spinning machinery. The next breakthrough was with the move over to break or open-end spinning, and then the adoption of artificial fibres. By then most production had moved to Asia.

== See also ==
- Wet processing engineering
- Textile manufacturing
- Clothing technology
- DREF friction spinning
- Spinster
- Blend (textile)
- Yarn realisation
- Spinning wheel

== Bibliography ==
- Collier, Ann M. (1970), A Handbook of Textiles, Pergamon Press, p. 258, ISBN 0-08-018057-4
