= Open-end spinning =

Technique for spinning yarn

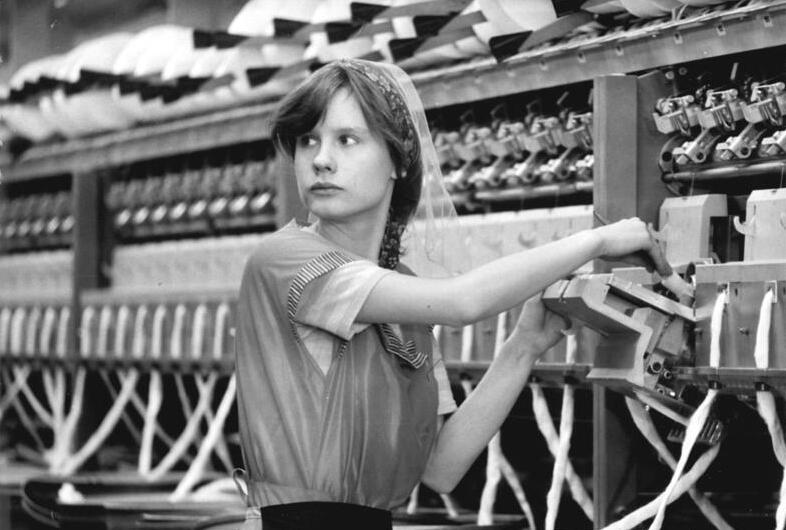
A spinner (Anett Mingram) cleans the spin box, the part containing the rotor. This allows for piecing, and a continuous conversion of sliver to yarn. (1987)

Open-end spinning is a technology for creating yarn without using a spindle. It was invented and developed in Czechoslovakia in Výzkumný ústav bavlnářský / Cotton Research Institute in Ústí nad Orlicí in 1963.

== Method ==
It is also known as break spinning or rotor spinning. The principle behind open-end spinning is similar to that of a clothes dryer spinning full of sheets. If you could open the door and pull out a sheet, it would spin together as you pulled it out. Sliver from the card goes into the rotor, is spun into yarn and comes out, wrapped up on a bobbin, all ready to go to the next step. There is no roving stage or re-packaging on an auto-coner. This system is much less labour-intensive and faster than ring spinning with rotor speeds up to 140,000 rpm. The Rotor design is the key to the operation of the open-ended spinners. Each type of fibre may require a different rotor design for optimal product quality and processing speed.

The first open-end machines in the United Kingdom were placed, under great secrecy, by Courtaulds into Maple Mill, Oldham in 1967.

One disadvantage of open-end spinning is that it is limited to coarser counts, another is the structure of the yarn itself with fibres less in parallel compared to ring-spun yarns, for example, consequently cloth made from open-end yarn has a "fuzzier" feel and poorer wear resistance.

== History ==
The global demand for spun fibre is huge. Converting raw fibre to yarn is a complicated process. Many manufacturers compete to provide the spinning machines that are essential to meeting the demand by delivering increases in spinning productivity and additional improvements in yarn quality. Over the past three centuries spinning technology has been continuously improved through thousands of minor innovations, and occasional major advances that have collectively increased the quality and lowered the cost of producing yarn dramatically.

Major technology advances have included:

- Hand spinning
- Mule spinning
- Ring spinning
- Open-end spinning
- Rotor spinning
- DREF friction spinning
- Air-jet spinning

Development stages of open-end spinning
1937	Berthelsen developed a relatively perfect open end.
1949	Julius Meimberg patented the rotor (open-end) spinning
1965	Czech KS200 rotor spinning machine was introduced at 30,000 rotor rpm.
1967	Improved BD200 with G5/1 Rieter were presented with first mill of OE coming under production.
1971–1975	There was a considerable increase in machine manufacturer and newer and improved version of machines were launched with increased speed at 100,000 rpm.
1975	Also witnessed first automated machine from Suessen equipped with Spincat and Cleancat which opened up the industrial rotor spinning breakthrough.
1977	Witnessed Schlafhorst with Autocoro machines, which made a mark in open-end market.

The number of manufacturers who can successfully compete has been reduced, as the technical complexity of the spinning machines has increased. However, there are many competent companies serving the global market for spinning machines who continue to pursue innovative ways to increase spinning productivity and yarn quality.

== Characteristics ==
A good open-end machine should have:

- Higher productivity

This is a major criterion, as productivity reduces the cost of manufacturing. The O.E. machines that are now in market boasts many basic needs like longer length of machine, higher speeds, able to process coarser hanks, fewer count changes, easy access to parts (less downtime for cleaning), longer production time between cleaning schedules, computerized controls for less power consumption and lower downtime and complete report generation giving leads to problem areas are some points worth discussing.

- High-capacity sliver cans (up to 18”)

In early days large machines were equipped with less distance between rotors (gauge of machine). This led to creeling of very small cans, which required frequent can changes. All major manufacturers currently allow cans up to 18” diameter leading to less breakage, less joining of yarn, hence better quality and higher productivity. Originally round cans were used. Rectangular cans are used because they double sliver capacity in the same sliver can footprint.

- Larger packages of yarn (4 to 5 kg)

The final package size has continued to increase. The final package size is important because it reduces tube change frequency and thus reduces idle time for creeling. Current yarn packages typically weigh 4–5 kg. The Savio Super Spinner 3000 currently has the largest package size at 6 kg.

- Less power consumption

Using individual motors and electronic controls for each of the various drives of the machine maximizes energy efficiency and minimizes downtime.

- Automation

All spinning machines, whether ring or open-end, need yarn joining to repair breaks or start new sliver cans. Joining the yarn has historically been a labor-intensive activity and a source of quality defects. Autopiecing units are robots that automate this process. Market leaders like Schlafhorst, Rieter, Savio, have machines that incorporate good quality autopiecers and autodoffing. This automation leads to less material handling costs and helps improve quality of the final product.

- Flexibility of spinning components

Many vendors are offering machines that can be programmed to produce many different types of yarns. The ability to rapidly change production results in the flexibility to serve multiple markets. A contemporary spinning mill should be able to produce a range of products: denim, knitting, towels, structured fabrics, construction fabrics, and various other products like core spun, multi count, etc.

- Handling count range.

Machines need to be easily programmed to spin yarns from 4sNe to 60sNe. This ability allows a single machine to produce yarns that cater to many different end-user requirements.

== Advantages ==
- Disappearance of simplex frame.
- Under certain circumstances, elimination of the second passage draw frame.
- In some cases, with the use of auto-leveller at the cards, elimination of even the draw frame passage.
- Bigger supply of cans to open-end and bigger packages to weaving.
- Elimination of winding.
- Less labor and power cost per kilogram of yarn.
- Higher productivity almost 7 times in the case of 10s and high efficiency.
- Fully automated mill a reality.
- Better uniformity in yarn

== Disadvantages ==
- Restricted only coarse counts.
- Usage restricted in case yarn is weak.
- Wear and tear of rotors, combing rollers, and navels are very high when high trash content mixing is used resulting in heavy replacement cost.

== Products ==
- Linen / flax yarns
- Cotton yarns
- Polyester cotton blended yarn
- Tencel 100%
- Polyester 100%
- Polyester / cotton / linen / viscose multi blend
- Dyed yarn (and fibre)
- Acrylic / rayon
- Recycle polyester 100% and different blends
