= Rieter =

Swiss textile machinery producer

Rieter Holding Ltd.
- Type: Public
- ISIN: CH0003671440
- Industry: Textiles Machinery
- Founded: 1795; 231 years ago in Winterthur, Old Swiss Confederacy
- Founder: Johann Jacob Rieter
- Headquarters: Winterthur, Switzerland
- Key people: Georg Stausberg (CEO); Carl Illi (Chairman)
- Products: Textile Machinery
- Brands: Accotex; Barmag; Bräcker; Graf; Novibra; Prosino; Rieter; SSM; Suessen; Temco
- Revenue: CHF 685.1 million (2025)
- Number of employees: 6 400 (Nov. 2026)
- Website: www.rieter.com

Rieter is a producer of textile machinery based in Winterthur, Switzerland.

== History ==
Rieter was founded as a global trading company in 1795 by Johann Jacob Rieter (1762-1826). Due to the Continental Blockade, Rieter entered the spinning business in 1812 with the establishment of the Wildbach spinning mill in Winterthur. The production of spinning machinery gradually emerged from the need to optimize the company’s own yarn production. It was not until after 1830 that Rieter developed into a machinery manufacturer.

In 1982, Rieter acquired the British textile machinery company Ernest Scragg & Sons Ltd. The group took over Automatik (founded in 1947) in 1992.

In 2011, the automotive products division, formerly Rieter Automotive, separated from Rieter and became a new corporation; Autoneum. The two Board Members of Rieter, Peter Spuhler and Michael Pieper, agreed to keep their shares in Autoneum for a certain agreed time period and to grant the new company a subordinated loan of 12.5 million CHF each.

On 30 June 2017, Rieter acquired SSM Textile Machinery Division (SSM) from Schweiter Technologies AG, Horgen (Switzerland) which now functions under the Rieter Component division. SSM deals in yarn winding equipment. SSM was formed by the merger of Schärer, Schweiter and Mettler companies in 1989. SSM took over Giudici S.p.A., Galbiate, Italy in February 2012 which is involved in false-twist texturing field machinery (fine count Nylon yarns). SSM also has a subsidiary in Zhongshan, China under the name of SSM (Zhongshan) Ltd, which helps in sales/support/service operations and also handles, manufacturing & assembling of machines for asian markets.

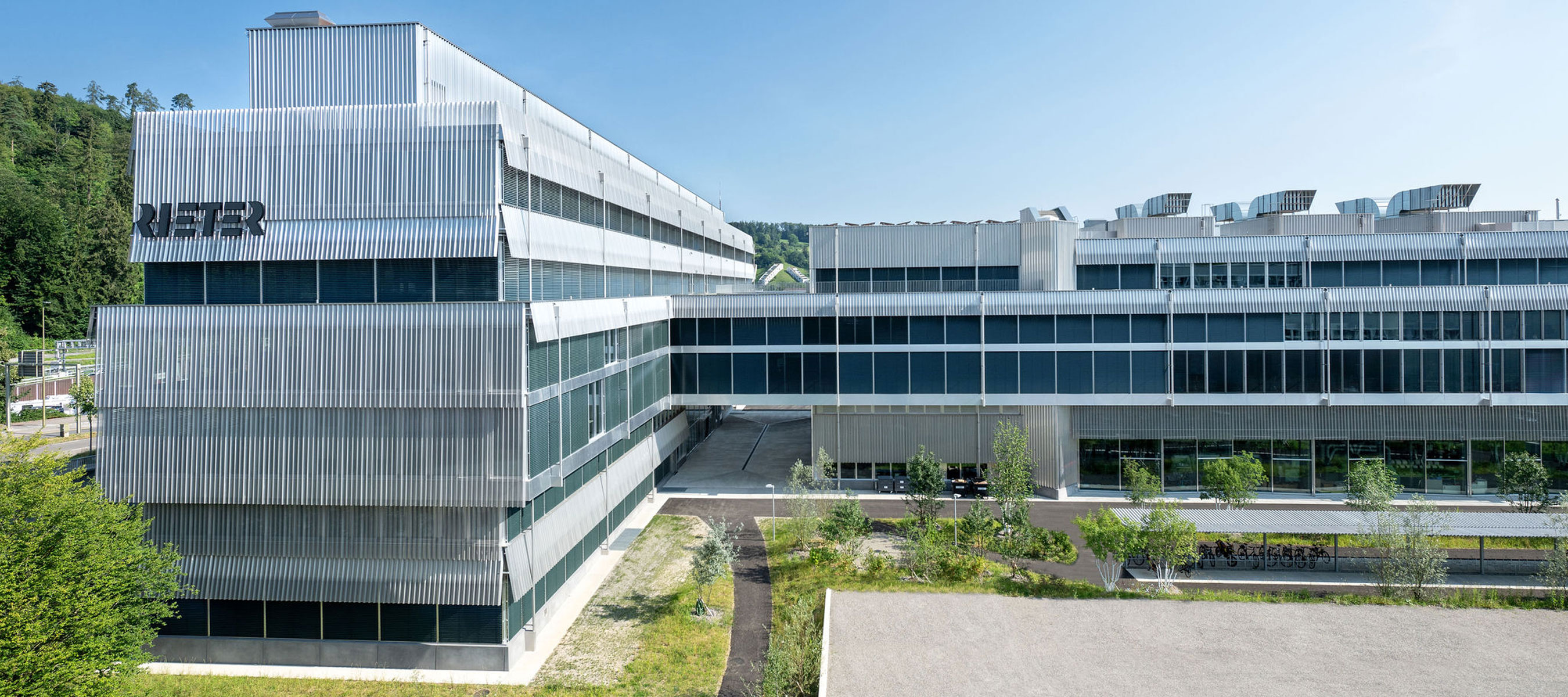
Rieter Campus in Winterthur, Switzerland.

In 2021, Rieter acquired three businesses from Saurer. On August 13, 2021, Rieter Holding Ltd., Winterthur (Switzerland), and Saurer Intelligent Technology Co. Ltd., Shanghai (China) listed and signed an agreement by which Rieter would acquire three businesses from Saurer Netherlands Machinery Company B.V., Amsterdam (Netherlands), the parent company of Saurer Spinning Solutions GmbH & Co. KG, Uebach-Palenberg (Germany) and Saurer Technologies GmbH & Co. KG, Krefeld (Germany). With this acquisition, Rieter completed the offering of ring- and compact spinning systems by acquiring the Schlafhorst automatic winder business. Additionally, Rieter invested in two component businesses: Accotex (elastomer components for spinning machines) and Temco (bearing solutions for filament machines).

In 2024, the new international headquarters of the Group, the Rieter Campus, was opened in Winterthur. It houses the customer center, product and technology development, as well as administrative functions.

As of 2 February 2026, Rieter acquired Barmag from OC Oerlikon. Barmag offers filament spinning systems for the production of man-made fibers, texturing machines, BCF systems, staple fiber spinning solutions, and nonwoven solutions.
