= Reddish (disambiguation) =

Reddish is an area of the Metropolitan Borough of Stockport in Greater Manchester, England.

Reddish may also refer to:

- Reddish, a shade of red
- Reddish, Cheshire, a location near Lymm, in Warrington, England
- Reddish (surname), including a list of people with the name
- 2884 Reddish, a main-belt asteroid
- Reddish House in Broad Chalke, Wiltshire, England

== See also ==
- Reddish South (disambiguation)
- Red, a colour
- Redditch, a town in Worcestershire, England
