= Audenshaw railway station =

Former railway station in England

Audenshaw

General information
- Location: Tameside, Greater Manchester; England
- Coordinates: 53°28′14″N 2°6′41″W
- Grid reference: SJ927971
- Platforms: 2

Other information
- Status: Disused

History
- Original company: London and North Western Railway
- Pre-grouping: London and North Western Railway
- Post-grouping: London, Midland and Scottish Railway

Key dates
- 1 November 1887: Opened as Hooley Hill Guide Bridge
- 1 January 1917: Closed for alterations
- 3 October 1921: Re-opened
- 2 June 1924: Renamed Audenshaw
- 25 September 1950: Station closed
- 1 January 1968: Line closed
Location

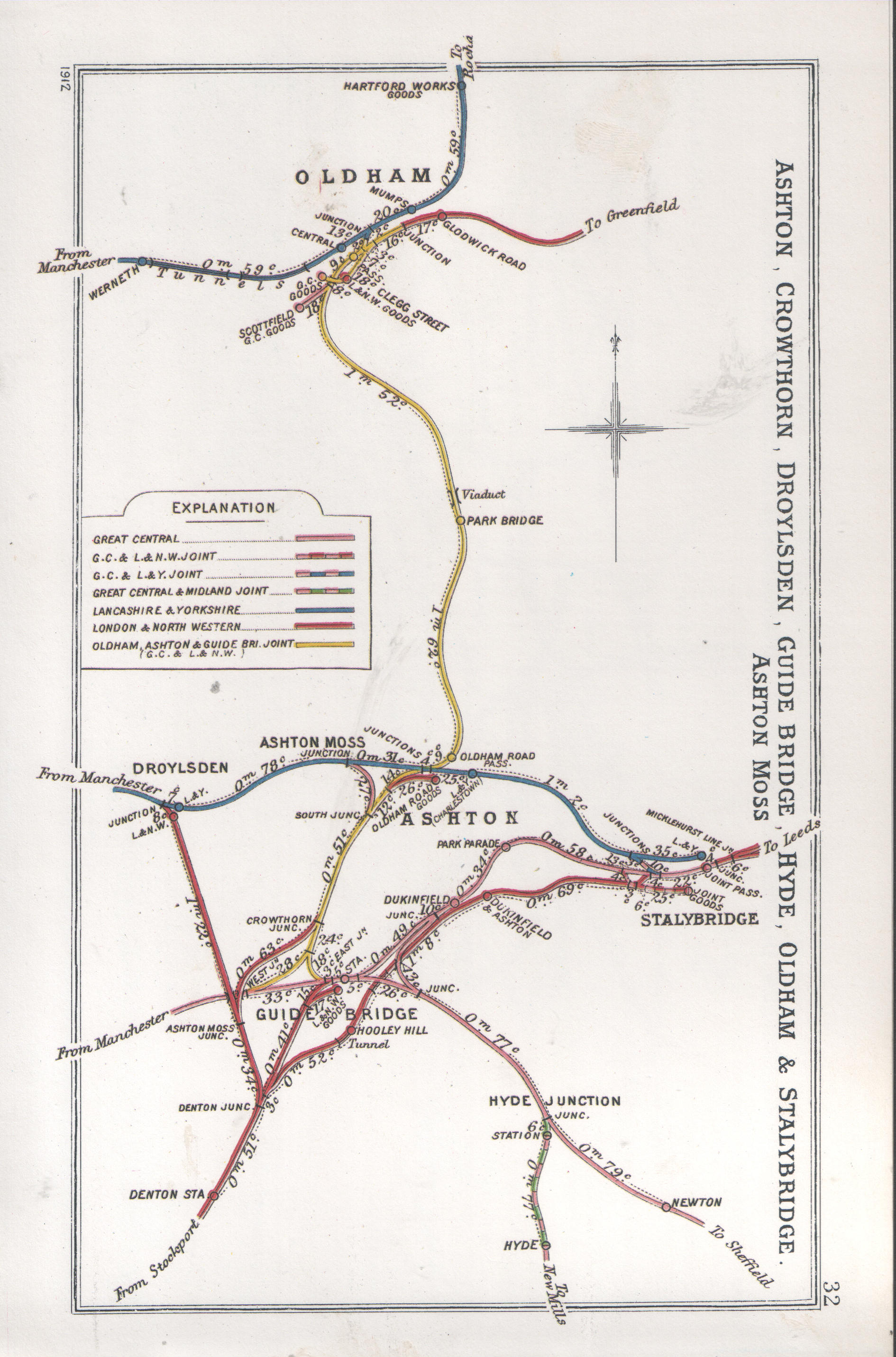
1912 Junction diagram of the Ashton Area, showing the station as Hooley Hill

Audenshaw railway station served the Hooley Hill area of Audenshaw, in Tameside, Manchester, England. There were two London and North Western Railway (L&NWR) stations with this name in different locations within the Audenshaw area; this was the second one located to the south of the area in Hooley Hill.

== History ==
The line through the station site opened on 1 November 1882, when the L&NWR opened the Denton and Dukinfield branch from Denton Junction to Dukinfield station (which became Dukinfield Central in 1954) on the Great Central Railway (GC).

The station opened as Hooley Hill Guide Bridge on 1 November 1887. It was located on the east side of Mount Pleasant Street, where the line emerged from a short tunnel. The station had two platforms one each side of the two running lines. There were no goods facilities.

In 1893, the L&NWR built their own Stalybridge junction line, from just south of the GC Dukinfield Central station through Dukinfield and Ashton to Stalybridge; the link to the GC station closed in 1902.

The station was closed for alterations from 1 January 1917 to 3 October 1921; it was renamed Audenshaw on 2 June 1924.

The Bradshaw's Guide timetable for 1922 listed 11 southbound & 12 northbound trains calling on Mondays to Saturdays, but none on Sundays.

The station closed on 25 September 1950 and the line was closed on 1 January 1968.

Preceding station	Disused railways	Following station
Denton	London and North Western Railway	Dukinfield; Denton and Dukinfield line GC (until 1902)
Denton	London and North Western Railway	Dukinfield and Ashton; Stalybridge junction line L&NWR (from 1893)

== Bibliography ==
- Bradshaw, George (1985) [July 1922]. Bradshaw's General Railway and Steam Navigation guide for Great Britain and Ireland: A reprint of the July 1922 issue. Newton Abbot: David & Charles. ISBN 978-0-7153-8708-5. OCLC 12500436.
- Brown, Joe (2021). Liverpool & Manchester Railway Atlas. Manchester: Crécy Publishing. ISBN 9780860936879. OCLC 1112373294.
- Hurst, Geoffrey (1992). Register of Closed Railways: 1948-1991. Worksop, Nottinghamshire: Milepost Publications. ISBN 0-9477-9618-5.
- Oliver, Henry; Airey, John (1894). Hand-book and Appendix of Stations, Junctions, Sidings, Collieries, &c., on the Railways in United Kingdom.
- Quick, Michael (2023) [2001]. Railway passenger stations in Great Britain: a chronology (PDF). version 5.05. Railway & Canal Historical Society.
