= Ashton Park Parade railway station =

Disused railway station in England

Coordinates: 53.48595°N 2.09237°W

Ashton Park Parade
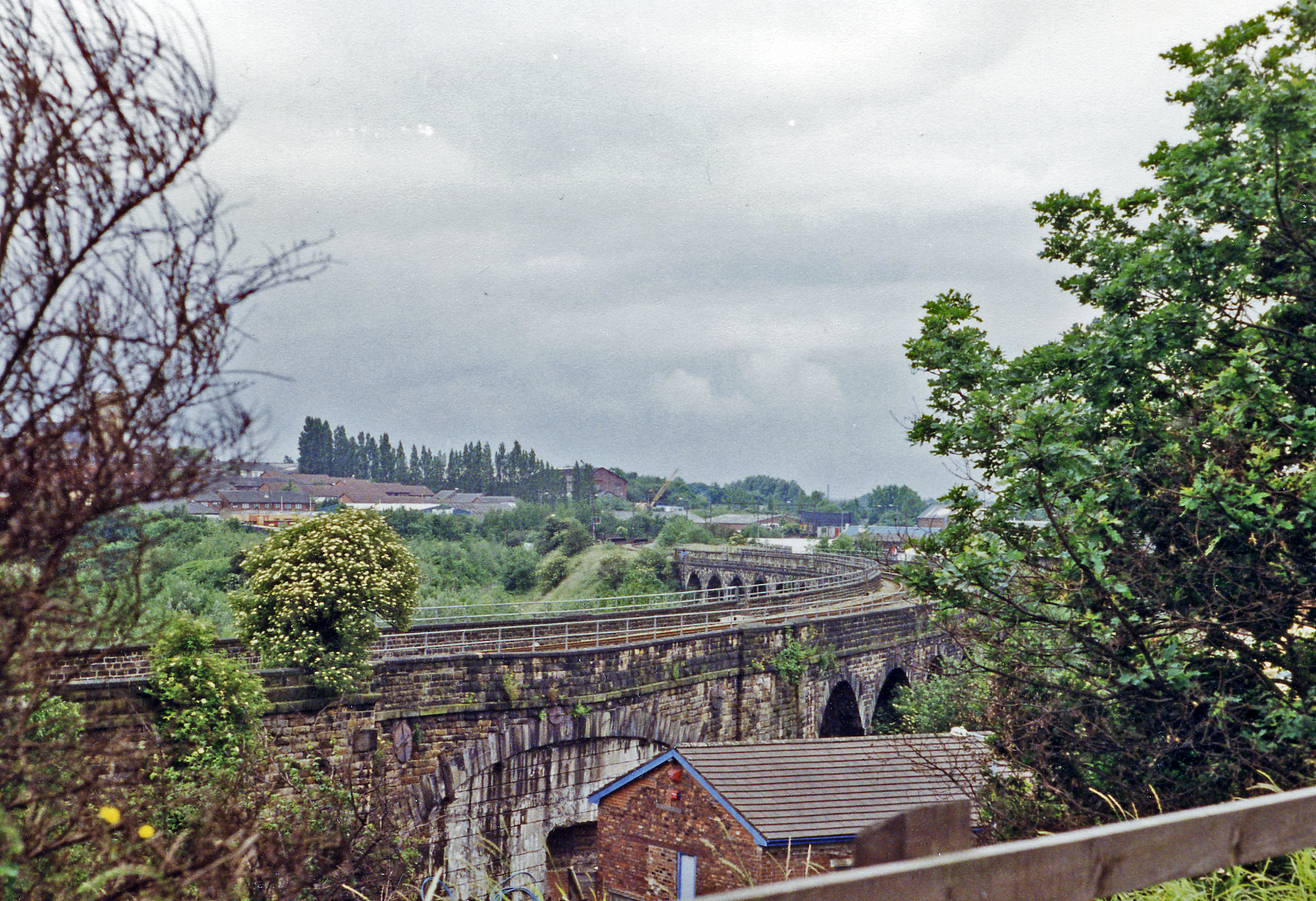
- Site of the station (1996)

General information
- Location: Ashton-under-Lyne, Tameside; England
- Platforms: 2

Other information
- Status: Disused

History
- Original company: Sheffield, Ashton-under-Lyne and Manchester Railway
- Pre-grouping: Great Central Railway
- Post-grouping: London and North Eastern Railway

Key dates
- 23 December 1845: Opened as Ashton
- 30 July 1862: Renamed Ashton Park Parade
- 5 November 1956: Closed
Location

Ashton Park Parade railway station was a station on the line between Guide Bridge and Stalybridge in Greater Manchester, England. This station served the town of Ashton-under-Lyne, now served only by Ashton Charlestown, north of this former station.

== Location ==
The down platform of Ashton Park Parade station was located on what is now a grass site to the south of Ashton's Park Parade Bypass and before the construction of the Bypass the down platform was approached directly from the end of Warrington Street where there was a large cobbled yard for passenger and parcel vehicles. The up platform stood on the edge of the escarpment, supported by arches and overlooking Lower Wharf Street. To the east of this platform were coal staithes where coal was dropped into vehicles waiting below in the coal yard. The lines serving the coal staithes were controlled by a signal box located on the opposite side of the line and just to the east of the down line platform where there was also a substantial goods siding. When the sidings were built Ashton's Old Baronial Hall was demolished to make way for them. These sidings occupied the land where the Bypass runs between the Parish Church and the railway line with the only remaining signs of the sidings being two wooden buildings in Church Street which once served the goods yard.

== History ==
Opened by the Manchester, Sheffield and Lincolnshire Railway, as the Stalybridge branch extension it later became part of the Great Central Railway, it then became part of the London and North Eastern Railway during the Grouping of 1923. The station then passed on to the London Midland Region of British Railways on nationalisation in 1948. It was then closed by the British Railways Board in 1956. It closed to goods on 2 November 1963.

== Present day ==
No remains of the former station are evident other than the well preserved flight of stone steps which ascend from Lower Wharf Street and led into the former Station Yard at the down platform entrance. The railway line is still open; TransPennine Express services between Liverpool/Manchester and the North East still run through the site of the old station, as does the once-weekly parliamentary service on the Stockport to Stalybridge Line. The only other clue of its existence is "The Station", a pub on Warrington Street, near the former station. The building of the Ashton by-pass sealed the fate of this station which cut it off from the towns main shopping street.

| Preceding station | Historical railways | Following station |
|---|---|---|
| Stalybridge; Line and station open | Great Central Railway; Manchester, Sheffield and Lincolnshire Railway | Dukinfield Central; Line open, station closed |
