= Dukinfield Central railway station =

Former railway station in Greater Manchester, England

Dukinfield Central

General information
- Location: Tameside, Greater Manchester; England
- Coordinates: 53.48146°N 2.09809°W
- Grid reference: SJ935983
- Platforms: 2

Other information
- Status: Disused

History
- Original company: Sheffield, Ashton-under-Lyne and Manchester Railway
- Pre-grouping: Great Central Railway
- Post-grouping: London and North Eastern Railway

Key dates
- 23 December 1845: Opened as Dukinfield
- March 1863: Resited SW
- 1954: Renamed Dukinfield Central
- 4 May 1959: Closed
Location

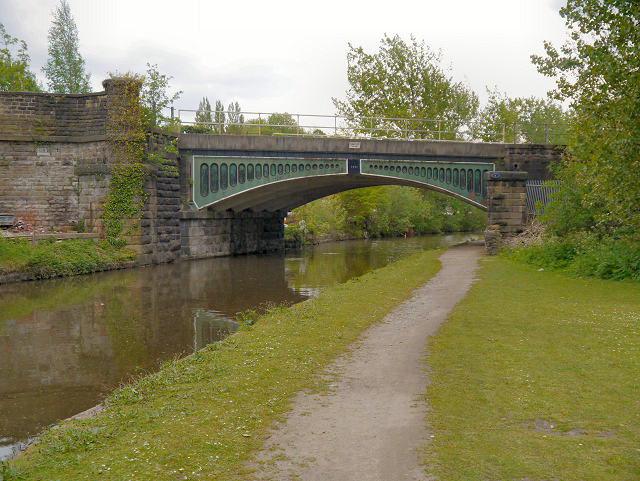
Railway bridge over the Peak Forest Canal at Dukinfield

Dukinfield Central railway station served the town of Dukinfield in Tameside, Greater Manchester, England from 1845 until 1959.

== History ==
The station was opened as Dukinfield on 23 December 1845, when the Sheffield, Ashton-under-Lyne and Manchester Railway opened its branch from Guide Bridge to Stalybridge.

=== First station ===
The station consisted of "a platform and open shed on the down side, and a bare narrow platform on the up, all of wooden construction, as were the steps by which they were approached. Nearby were half-a-dozen small cottages owned by the company, one of which, the residence of the clerk-in-charge, was used as a booking office and waiting room." (Note: Down trains usually headed away from the major conurbation, usually London, but some railway companies ran 'up' to their headquarters location; in this case, 'up' was towards Stalybridge.)

The platforms were lengthened in 1842 and gas lighting was installed in 1844.

=== Second station ===
The station was rebuilt in 1863; the new station was closer to the canal and 117 yd (107 m) nearer to Guide Bridge station.

It was situated on Wharf Street between Station Street and the Peak Forest Canal, next to the Wharf Tavern. The station building was two-storeys high, with steps from the forecourt up to the first floor at platform level.

By 1893, the station platforms had been extended over the canal so they were now twice the length of the originals.

In 1954, the station was renamed Dukinfield Central.

The station closed to passengers on 4 May 1959.

The station did not have goods facilities, although Dukinfield goods station did; this was located on the London and North Western Railway, just west of their Dukinfield and Ashton station.

Preceding station	National Rail	Following station
Ashton Park Parade	Great Central Railway; Manchester, Sheffield and Lincolnshire Railway	Guide Bridge

== Bibliography ==
- Brown, Joe (2021). Liverpool & Manchester Railway Atlas. Manchester: Crécy Publishing. ISBN 9780860936879. OCLC 1112373294.
- Clinker, C. R. (October 1978). Clinker's Register of Closed Passenger Stations and Goods Depots in England, Scotland and Wales 1830–1977. Bristol: Avon-Anglia Publications & Services. ISBN 0-905466-19-5. OCLC 5726624.
- Dow, George (1959). Great Central, Volume One: The Progenitors, 1813-1863. London: Locomotive Publishing Company. OCLC 60021205.
- Grant, Donald J. (2017). Directory of the Railway Companies of Great Britain (1st ed.). Kibworth Beauchamp, Leicestershire: Troubador Publishing Ltd. ISBN 978-1-78803-768-6.
- Quick, Michael (2023) [2001]. Railway passenger stations in Great Britain: a chronology (PDF). version 5.05. Railway & Canal Historical Society.
- Simmons, Jack (1997). "'up' and 'down'". In Simmons, Jack; Biddle, Gordon (eds.). The Oxford Companion to British Railway History From 1603 to the 1990s (1st ed.). Oxford: Oxford University Press. p. 548. ISBN 0-19-211697-5.
