= Senator Littlefield =

Senator Littlefield may refer to:

- Alfred H. Littlefield (1829–1893), Rhode Island State Senate
- Nathaniel Littlefield (1804–1882), Maine State Senate
- Richard W. Littlefield (1948–2012), Georgia State Senate
- Rick Littlefield (born 1952), Oklahoma State Senate
