= Audenshaw railway station (1883–1905) =

Railway station in Tameside, Greater Manchester, England

Audenshaw

General information
- Location: Tameside; England
- Coordinates: 53.47062°N 2.11174°W
- Platforms: 2

Other information
- Status: Disused

History
- Original company: London and North Western Railway
- Pre-grouping: London and North Western Railway
- Post-grouping: London Midland and Scottish Railway

Key dates
- 1 November 1883: Station opened
- 1 May 1905: Station closed
Location

Audenshaw railway station served the western side of Audenshaw, Tameside. There were two London and North Western Railway (L&NWR) stations with this name in different locations within the Audenshaw area, this was the first one located in the west of the area adjacent to Ryecroft Hall.

The line through the station site opened on 1 March 1882 when the L&NWR opened the Ashton branch junction line between Droylsden junction and Ashton Moss junction.

The station opened as Audenshaw on 1 November 1883.

The station was located on an embankment opposite the junction of Manchester Road and Droylsden Road. The station had two platforms on the south side of Manchester Road, one each side of the two running lines. There were no goods facilities. The station building was at road level on the western side of the railway.

In 1895 the station had six services in each direction, to either Manchester Victoria or Manchester Exchange, all of them starting or terminating at Stockport. There was no service on Sundays.

The station closed on 1 May 1905. The line closed on 6 July 1969.

The overbridge has long been demolished. The station building still remains, in 2014 it was in use as a computer repair shop.

Preceding station	Disused railways	Following station
Denton	London and North Western Railway; Ashton branch junction line	Droylsden

== Bibliography ==
- Bradshaw, George (2011) [December 1895]. Bradshaw's Rail Times for Great Britain and Ireland December 1895: A Reprint of the Classic Timetable Complete with Period Advertisements and Shipping Connections to All Parts. Midhurst: Middleton Press. ISBN 978-1-908174-11-6. OCLC 832579861.
- Goode, C. T. (1986). The railways of Manchester. Hull: C.T. Goode. ISBN 0-9508239-8-8. OCLC 500124682.
- Greville, M.D. (1981). Chronology of the Railways of Lancashire and Cheshire (Revised and Combined ed.). Railway & Canal Historical Society. ISBN 0-901461-30-X.
- Hurst, Geoffrey (1992). Register of Closed Railways: 1948-1991. Worksop, Nottinghamshire: Milepost Publications. ISBN 0-9477-9618-5.
- Oliver, Henry; Airey, John (1894). Hand-book and Appendix of Stations, Junctions, Sidings, Collieries, &c., on the Railways in United Kingdom.
- Quick, Michael (2023) [2001]. Railway passenger stations in Great Britain: a chronology (PDF). version 5.05. Railway & Canal Historical Society.
