= Reddish (surname) =

Reddish is a surname. Notable people with the surname include:

- Cam Reddish (born 1999), American basketball player
- Jack Reddish (1926–1992), American alpine skier
- John Reddish (1904–1989), English footballer and cricketer
- John Reddish (soldier) (1902–1971), Australian army officer
- Mark Reddish (born 1985), New Zealand rugby union player
- Riley Reddish (1933–2008), American politician
- Samuel Reddish (1735–1785), theatre manager and actor in England
- Sarah Reddish (1850–1928), British trade unionist and suffragette
- Tim Reddish (born 1957), British Paralympic swimmer
- Vincent Cartledge Reddish (1926–2015), British astronomer

== See also ==
- Redish, surname
