= Denton railway station =

Railway station in Greater Manchester, England

Denton
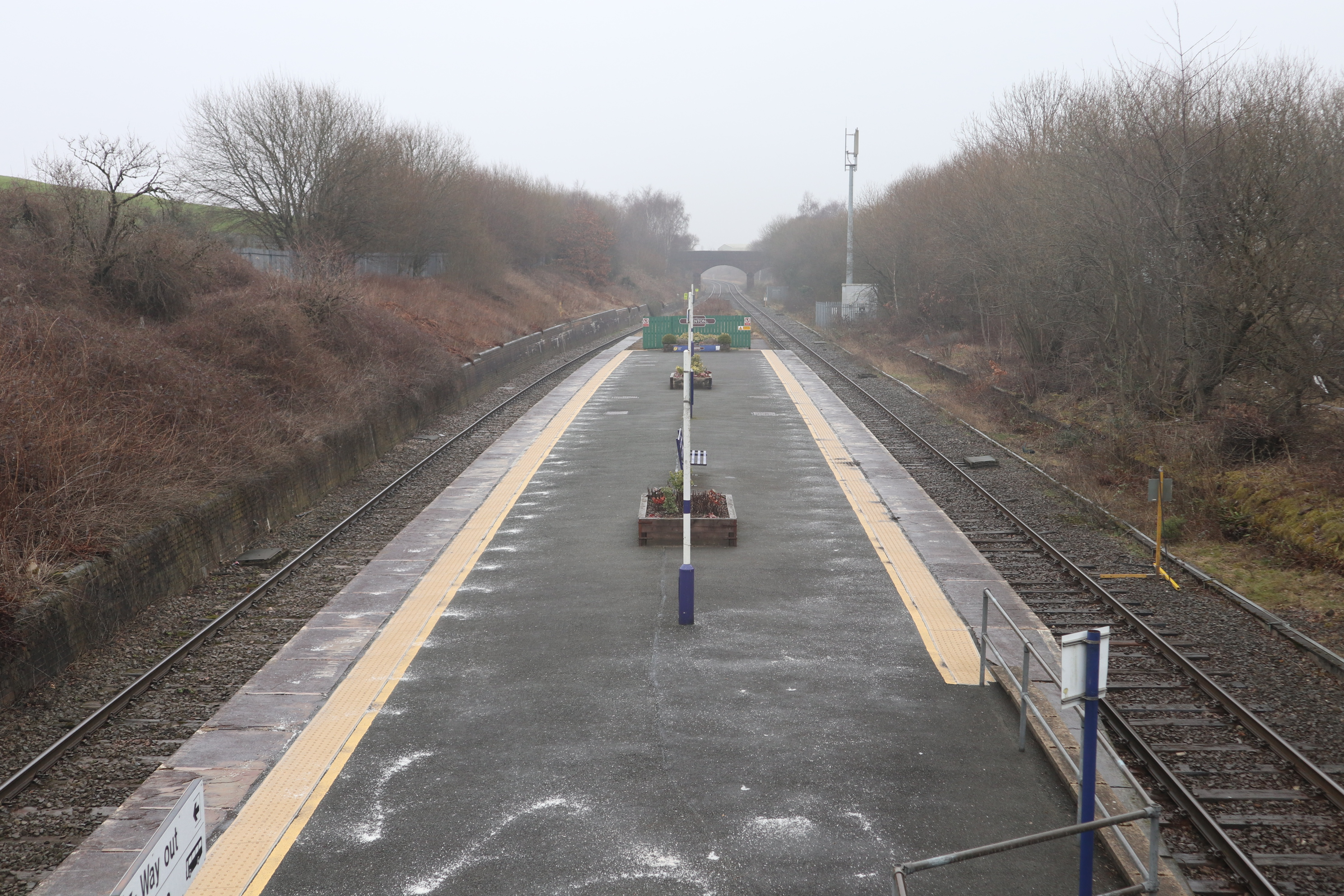
- Denton station, February 2025

General information
- Location: Denton, Tameside, England
- Coordinates: 53.4575°N 2.1306°W
- Grid reference: SJ914956
- Manager: Northern Trains
- Transit authority: Transport for Greater Manchester
- Platforms: 2

Other information
- Station code: DTN
- Classification: DfT category F2

History
- Opened: Circa 1851

Passengers
- 2021/22: ▲50
- 2022/23: ▼34
- 2023/24: ▲54
- 2024/25: ▲100
- 2025/26: 100
Location
Notes
- Passenger statistics from the Office of Rail and Road

Denton railway station serves the town of Denton, in Tameside, Greater Manchester, England. It lies on the Stockport–Stalybridge line, between Guide Bridge and Reddish South, 3 miles 39 chains (5.6 km) from Heaton Norris Junction, near Stockport. Northern Trains operates two trains per week, one in each direction on Saturday mornings.

== History ==
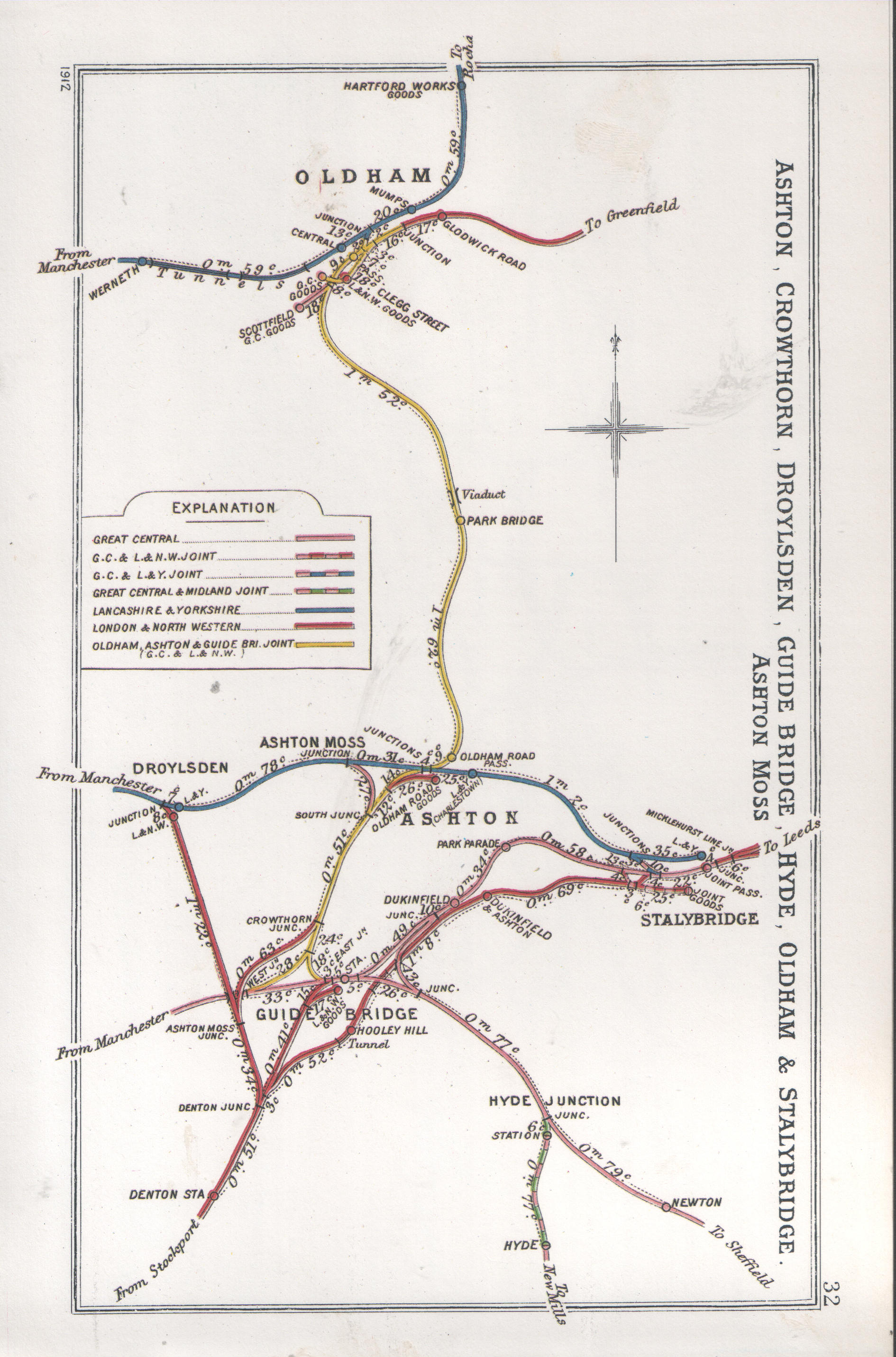
A 1912 Railway Clearing House Junction Diagram showing railways in the vicinity of Denton (bottom left)

The orientation of the line, running south-west to north-east, is a clue to its origin; it stands on the former main line of the London & North Western Railway (LNWR) between Crewe and Leeds, via Stockport. The LNWR had already completed its line to Manchester Store Street, via Stockport, and now looked to expand to reach the woollen districts of the West Riding of Yorkshire, building quadruple tracks all the way to Huddersfield and Leeds, via the Standedge Tunnel. The line between Guide Bridge and Heaton Norris Junction (north of Stockport) was surveyed by the Manchester and Birmingham Railway in 1845, shortly before it became part of the LNWR, and opened in 1849.

The station was opened by the LNWR around 1851, and the route through the station was quadrupled in 1889. Before the Railways Act 1921, it was served by trains from Stockport to Ashton-under-Lyne, Oldham Mumps, Rochdale and Stalybridge; a very limited passenger service ran to Manchester. The line to Droylesden, for which Denton was a junction station, closed in 1969. Stalybridge could also be reached via Hooley Hill and the Stalybridge Junction Railway, but the route closed to passengers in 1950.

The older route via Guide Bridge remained a useful link between the northern and southern Manchester railway networks. This ensured its continued use by British Rail until the late 1980s; before May 1989, an hourly service ran on weekdays along the route. The rerouting of the Leeds–Huddersfield–Manchester express service to Manchester Piccadilly at the May 1989 timetable change made the service essentially redundant though, as travellers could then access south Manchester services directly at Piccadilly, and its frequency was substantially cut. By 1992, it had been reduced to just a single weekly parliamentary train; this is the statutory minimum level necessary to avoid the requirement for formal closure proceedings.

=== Closure proposal ===
In 2013, Network Rail, in their Route Utilisation Strategy (RUS) report for the North West, proposed the closure of Reddish South and Denton stations, along with withdrawal of the remaining passenger service.

The promotion of a passenger service through Denton station seems uncertain, whilst the future of freight traffic seems more assured as evidenced by Network Rail's North West Rail Utilisation Strategy: May 2007. A more frequent service was considered for the 2008 timetable shakeup, which was designed to implement major changes to service patterns on the West Coast Main Line; however, because of the track layout and congestion at Heaton Norris, operational analysis suggests that: "Timetabling the move across Heaton Norris is very likely to be problematic. Performance could be impacted by the crossing move at Heaton Norris Junction. If there are two passenger trains an hour on this line, it will be more difficult to hold freight trains on the Denton line, additionally affecting performance."

Reddish South and Denton receive a minimal service because anticipated demand has not justified increasing it. The operating cost of providing a service at this station exceeds the revenue and socio-economic benefit they generate, even before periodic renewal costs are considered." It continues to say that for passenger effects: "The stations are both served by one train a week on a Saturday, in one direction only. A full impact analysis would be required prior to formal closure procedures, but it is reasonable to assume that any journey that could be made using this service could equally well be made by another mode. Data collection including observation on a representative Saturday has been unable to record any use of these stations. Consultation respondents cautioned against this option whilst uncertainty remains about local regeneration."

The 2012 North West Route Utilisation Strategy: Final Recommendations report stated that provision of W9 and W10 gauge clearance would allow intermodal trains to/from Trafford Park to divert via Denton; this would improve performance when the primary route is disrupted or closed. There were no remarks concerning RUS 5.3.2, the Stockport corridor.

== Passenger volume ==
With 30 passenger entries and exits between April 2011 and March 2012, Denton was the third-least used station in Great Britain. By 2015–16, the estimate of station usage had changed little, with 37 passenger journeys recorded for an entire year on the weekly train to Stalybridge. In 2018/19, Denton was deemed the joint least-used station in Great Britain, with Stanlow & Thornton. Reddish South, also in Greater Manchester and one stop south of the station, was ranked the third least used with just 60 entries and exits.

By 2022–23, the station had 34 entries and exits recorded, which made it technically the second least-used station in Great Britain; the least-used station, Teesside Airport, had its service suspended in May 2022 because the single platform that was in use at the time was deemed unsafe, which resulted in the station only reporting two entries and exits. This made Denton the least used station in Great Britain that was open all throughout the year.

Passenger volume at Denton
	2006–07	2007–08	2008–09	2009–10	2010–11	2011–12	2012–13	2013–14	2014–15	2015–16	2016–17	2017–18	2018–19	2019–20	2020–21	2021–22	2022–23	2023–24	2024–25
Entries and exits	65	53	56	496	52	30	194	110	120	74	144	70	46	92	12	50	34	54	100

The statistics cover twelve month periods that start in April.

== Services ==
In the 20 May 2018 timetable changes, Arriva Rail North introduced a return service at the station and changed the day of operation to Saturday. From the December 2024 timetable, the Northern Trains Saturdays-only service departs from Denton at 08:42 for Stockport and returns at 09:16 heading back to Stalybridge.

Preceding station	National Rail	Following station
Reddish South	Northern Trains Stockport–Stalybridge line Saturday only	Guide Bridge
Disused railways
Terminus	London and North Western Railway LNWR Droylsden line	Audenshaw (1st)
Terminus	London and North Western Railway; Denton and Dukinfield line	Audenshaw (2nd)

== Community rail ==
The station, along with neighbouring Reddish South, is part of the South East Manchester Community Rail Partnership.

== Bibliography ==
- Quick, Michael (2023). Railway Passenger Stations in Great Britain: A Chronology (PDF) (5th ed.). London: Railway and Canal Historical Society.
