= Redish =

Redish is a surname. Notable people with the surname include:

- Angela Redish, Canadian economist
- Janice Redish, American writer
- Martin Redish, American legal scholar
- David Redish, American neuroscientist

== See also ==
- Reddish (surname)
