= Dukinfield and Ashton railway station =

Former railway station in England

Dukinfield and Ashton

General information
- Location: Tameside; England
- Coordinates: 53.48260°N 2.09354°W
- Grid reference: SJ938984
- Platforms: 2

Other information
- Status: Disused

History
- Original company: London and North Western Railway
- Pre-grouping: London and North Western Railway
- Post-grouping: London, Midland and Scottish Railway

Key dates
- 2 October 1893: Opened
- 25 September 1950: Closed
- 30 January 1965: Closed for freight
Location

Dukinfield and Ashton railway station served Dukinfield in Greater Manchester, England.

The line through the station site opened in August 1893 when the London and North Western Railway (L&NWR) opened the Stalybridge junction line from a new junction just south of Dukinfield station on the Great Central Railway to Stalybridge, thereby providing its own route to Stalybridge from Denton Junction.

The station was built at high level on a viaduct as it passed through Dukinfield. The station was opened on 2 October 1893.

Access to the platforms was via an entrance in Cooper Street and ascending a staircase inside one of viaduct pillars.

The station was closed on 25 September 1950.

The goods yard, called just Dukinfield, was to the south-west of the passenger station, it had a goods shed and a 10 ton crane, it closed on 30 January 1965.

The line closed completely on 1 January 1968.

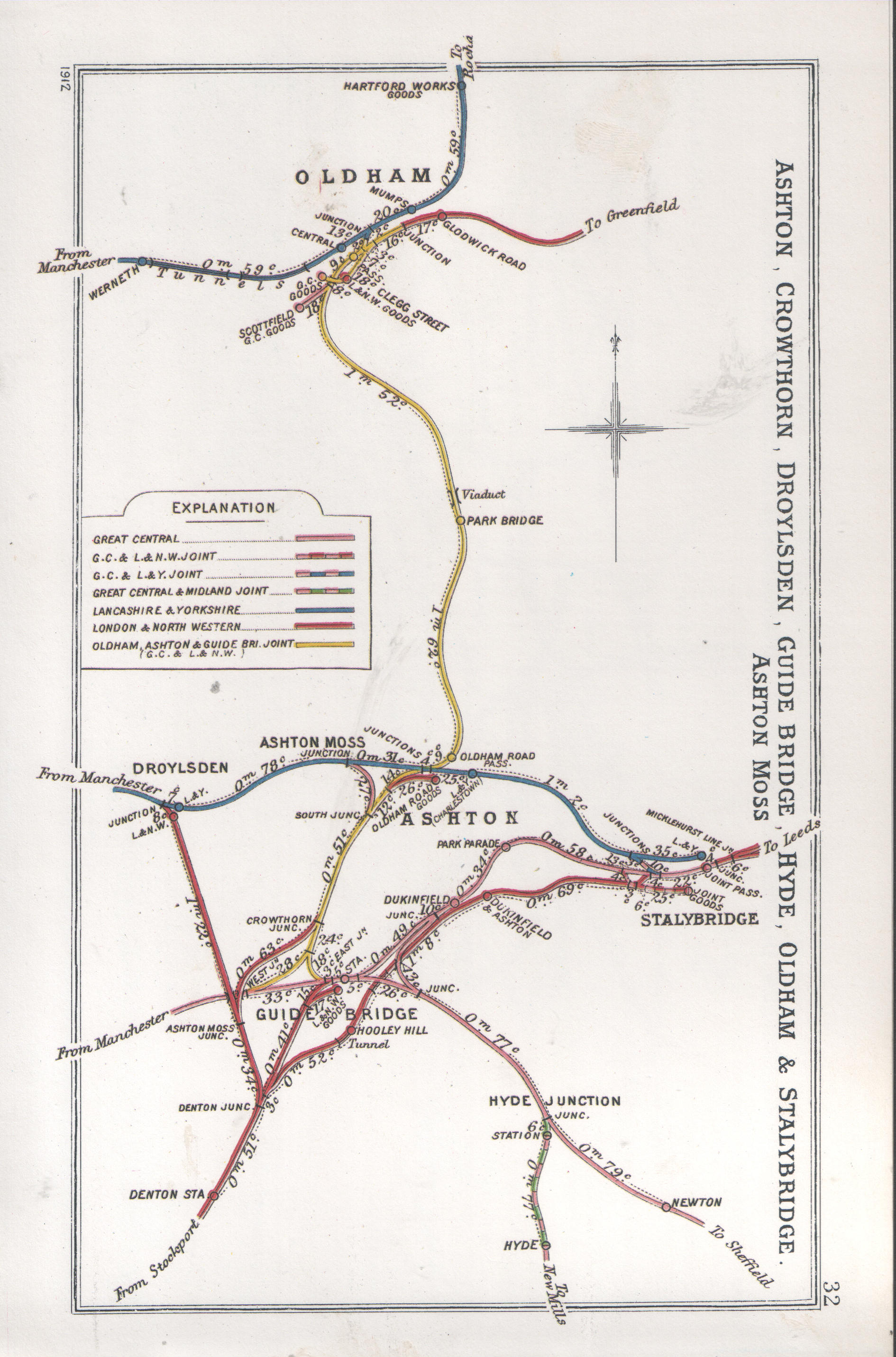
A 1912 Railway Clearing House Junction Diagram showing the railway and station (red line bottom centre)

Preceding station	Disused railways	Following station
Hooley Hill	L&NWR; Stalybridge junction line	Stalybridge

== Bibliography ==
- Brown, Joe (2021). Liverpool & Manchester Railway Atlas. Manchester: Crécy Publishing. ISBN 9780860936879. OCLC 1112373294.
- Hurst, Geoffrey (1992). Register of Closed Railways: 1948-1991. Worksop, Nottinghamshire: Milepost Publications. ISBN 0-9477-9618-5.
- Quick, Michael (2023) [2001]. Railway passenger stations in Great Britain: a chronology (PDF). version 5.05. Railway & Canal Historical Society.
- Reed, Malcolm C. (1996). The London & North Western Railway: A History. Atlantic Transport. ISBN 978-0-906899-66-3.
- The Railway Clearing House (1970) [1904]. The Railway Clearing House Handbook of Railway Stations 1904 (1970 D&C Reprint ed.). Newton Abbot: David & Charles Reprints. ISBN 0-7153-5120-6.
