= Reddish South =

Reddish South may refer to:

- Reddish South railway station
- Reddish South (electoral ward, 2004–2022)
- Reddish South (electoral ward, 2023–present)
