= Stockport railway station =

Railway station in Greater Manchester, England

Stockport
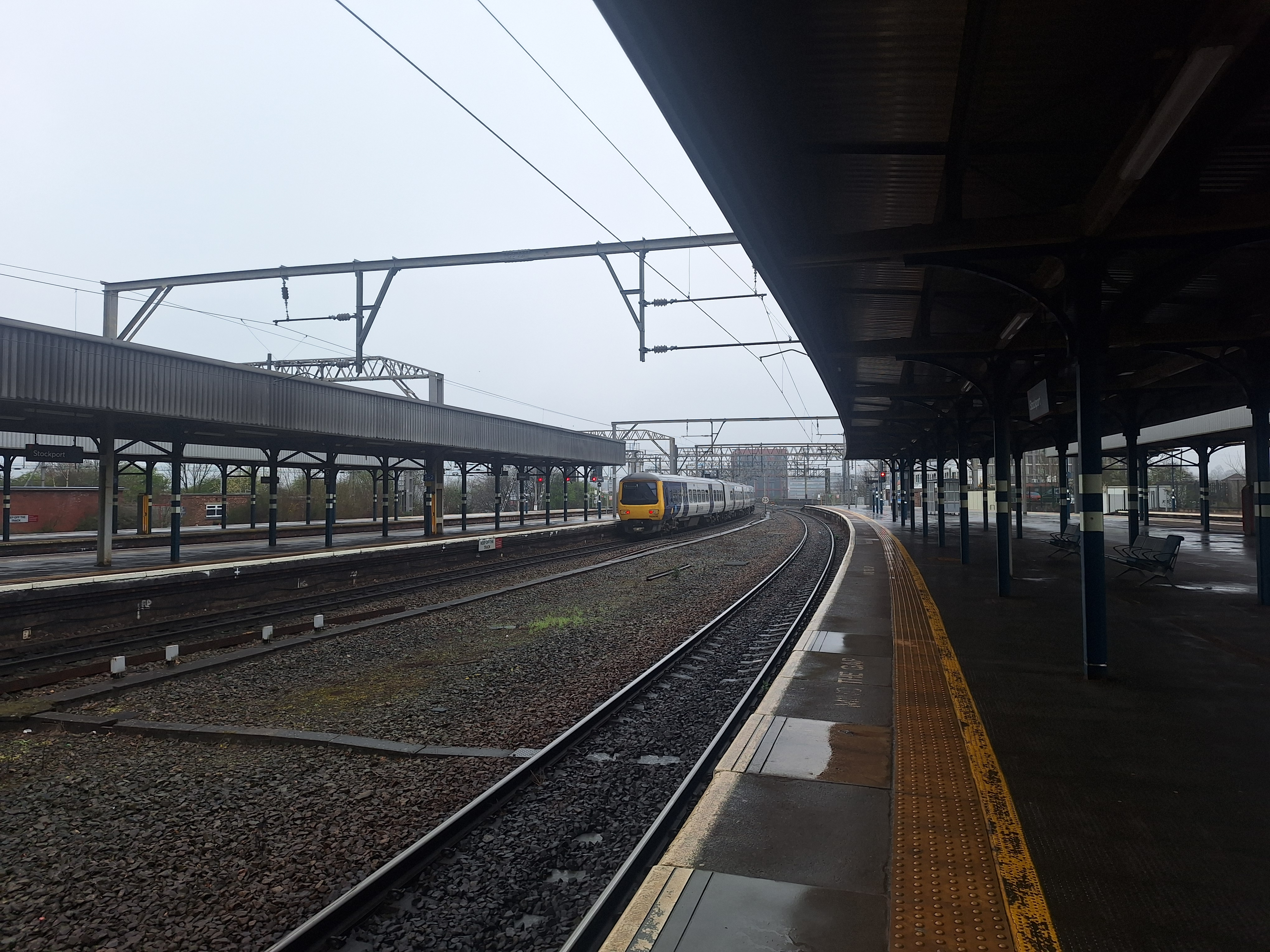
- Stockport station in 2025

General information
- Location: Stockport, Metropolitan Borough of Stockport, England
- Coordinates: 53°24′21″N 2°9′45″W
- Grid reference: SJ892898
- Manager: Avanti West Coast
- Platforms: 6 (numbered 0-3, 3a, 4)

Other information
- Station code: SPT
- Classification: DfT category B

History
- Original company: Manchester and Birmingham Railway
- Pre-grouping: London and North Western Railway
- Post-grouping: London, Midland and Scottish Railway

Key dates
- 15 February 1843: Opened as Edgeley
- ?: Renamed Stockport Edgeley
- 6 May 1968: Renamed Stockport

Passengers
- 2020/21: ▼0.913 million
- Interchange: ▼0.128 million
- 2021/22: ▲2.786 million
- Interchange: ▲0.456 million
- 2022/23: ▲3.143 million
- Interchange: ▼0.364 million
- 2023/24: ▲3.777 million
- Interchange: ▲0.438 million
- 2024/25: ▲4.296 million
- Interchange: ▲0.462 million
Location
Notes
- Passenger statistics from the Office of Rail and Road

Stockport railway station serves the market and industrial town of Stockport, in Greater Manchester, England. It is located 6 miles (9.7 km) south-east of Manchester Piccadilly, on a spur of the West Coast Main Line to London Euston.

== History ==
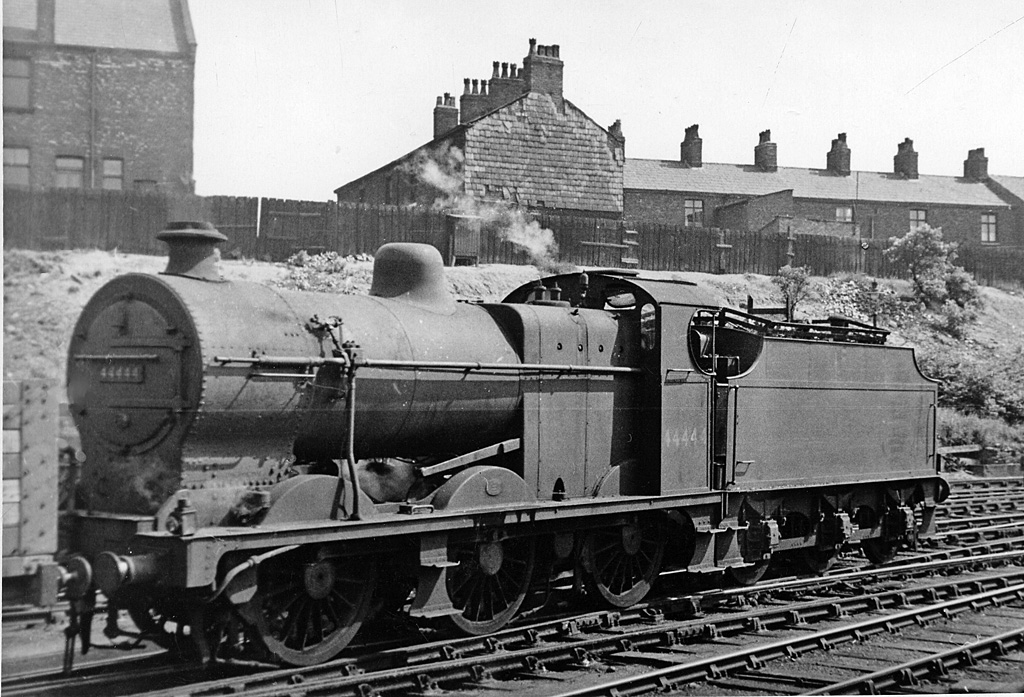
An LMS Fowler Class 4F shunting just south of the station, 1950

The Manchester and Birmingham Railway (M&BR) opened in stages from Manchester and reached Stockport in 1840. The 5.5-mile (9 km) line ran from a temporary station in Manchester to another in Stockport, at the north end of the uncompleted Stockport Viaduct. The temporary station, which was later renamed Heaton Norris, was Stockport's only station for more than two years. After the viaduct was completed, the M&BR built a station at its southern end as an experiment. The decision was prompted by complaints that the first station was a long way from the industrial parts of town and even farther from the residential districts on the south side. The second station opened on 15 February 1843 as Edgeley; by 1844, it became the town's principal station. Heaton Norris, at the north end of the viaduct, closed in 1959.

The station was operated by the London and North Western Railway (LNWR) and became part of the London, Midland and Scottish Railway (LMS) in 1923. In 1948, operations transferred to British Railways.

Most lines into the station were electrified at 25 kV AC, using overhead wires, under the British Railways' 1955 Modernisation Plan; however, not all of the local lines were electrified.

On 27 January 2025, as part of publicity for the new Scott Mills Breakfast Show on BBC Radio 2, all of the station signs were changed from Stockport to "Scottport" for the day.

== Facilities ==
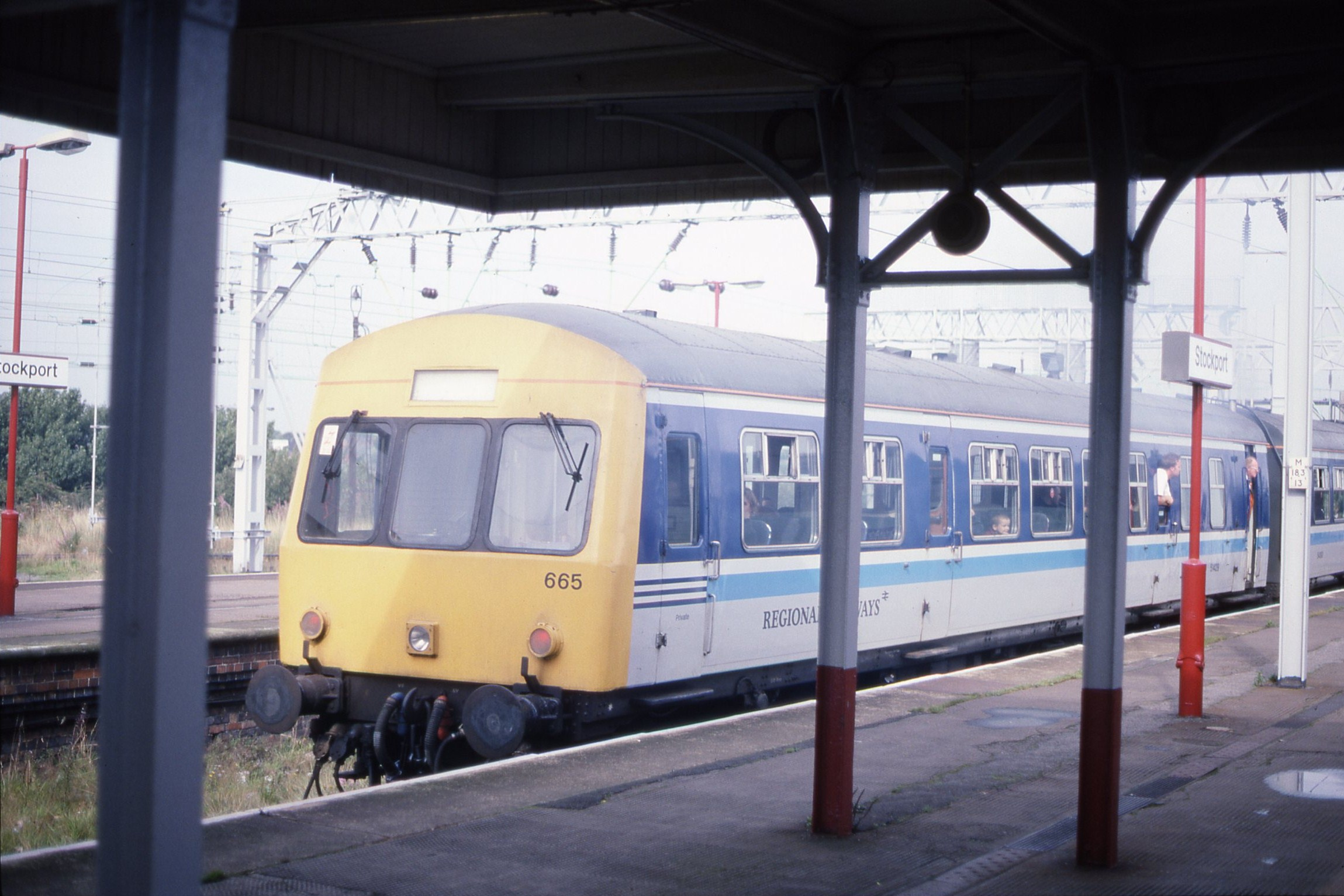
A Regional Railways-branded Class 101 diesel multiple unit, 1993

The station is positioned at high level above the valley of the River Mersey, with lifts that link a pedestrian underpass to central Stockport and Edgeley.

The station is staffed, with a ticket office, ticket machines, customer service points, shops, toilets, waiting rooms, lifts from the station subway and step-free access to the platforms.

In 2009, the station was identified as one of the ten worst category B interchange stations for mystery shopper assessment of fabric and environment; it received a share of £50m funding for improvements.

== Routes ==
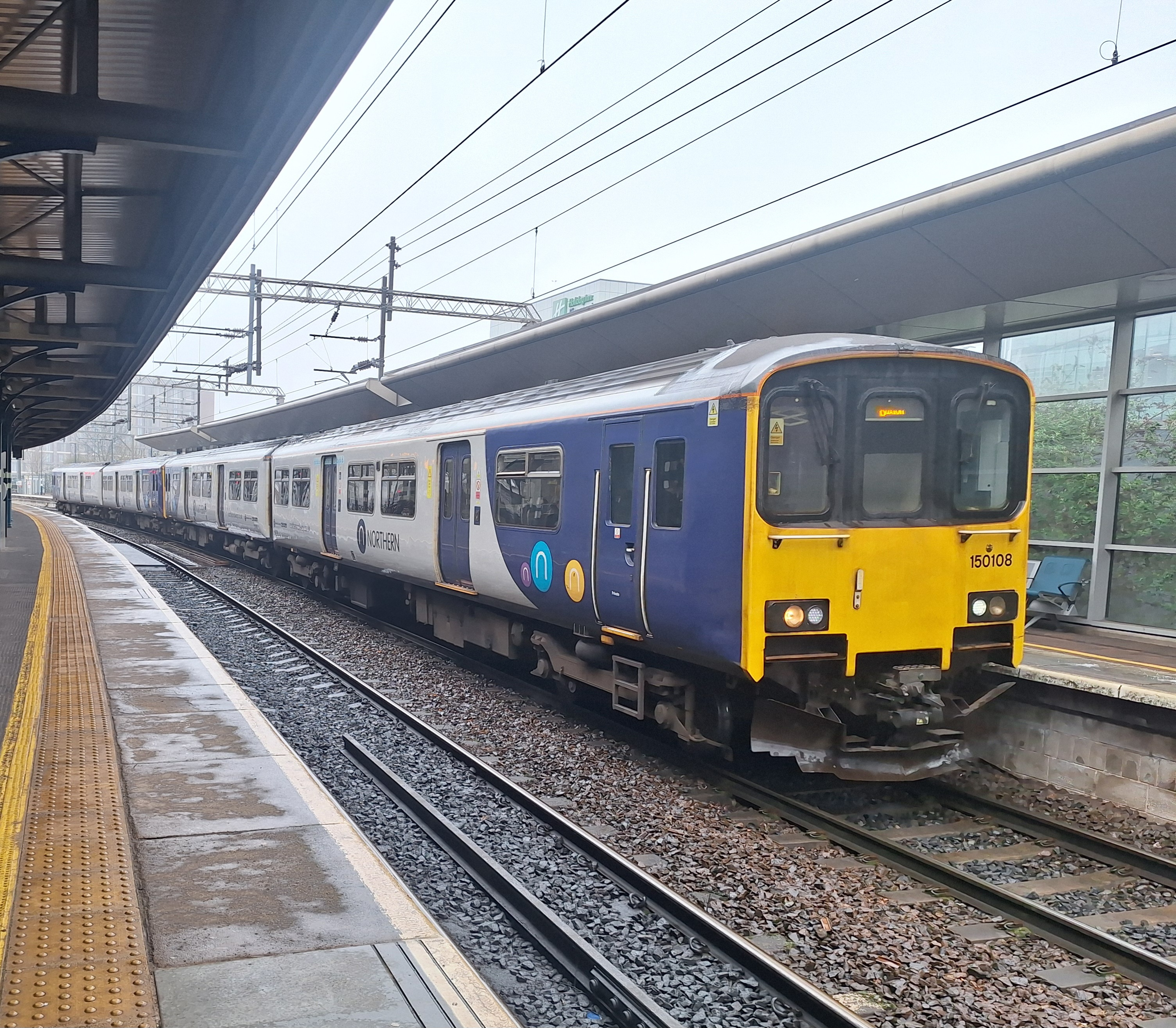
A Northern Trains Class 150, 2025

Trains running north-west serve Manchester Piccadilly; some continue on to Manchester Oxford Road and beyond to Liverpool Lime Street, via Warrington Central. Passengers wishing to travel north should change at Piccadilly or Oxford Road.

South-east from Stockport, express services run to Sheffield and onwards to Cleethorpes, Nottingham and Norwich; local services run to Hazel Grove and Buxton.

The two southbound West Coast Main Line routes run via Cheadle Hulme: one continues via Macclesfield and Stoke-on-Trent to Birmingham New Street or London Euston; the other via Wilmslow and Crewe for through services to London Euston or via Shrewsbury and the Welsh Marches line to Cardiff Central, Carmarthen, Pembroke Dock and Milford Haven. Trains to Birmingham, via Stoke-on-Trent, continue to destinations in the south of England including Bournemouth, via Reading, and Bristol Temple Meads.

The Mid-Cheshire Line runs westbound to Chester, via Altrincham, Knutsford and Northwich.

The Stockport to Stalybridge Line, via Guide Bridge, no longer has a daily passenger service. It was reduced from an hourly shuttle service to a once a week, one direction only skeleton service in the early 1990s. It now has two services a week, one in each direction on Saturday mornings.

The main concourse opened in September 2004, in a development that included a new platform 0 that only became fully operational at the beginning of March 2008. A pedestrian subway leads to the island platforms, which have a buffet and a newsagent.

== Platforms ==
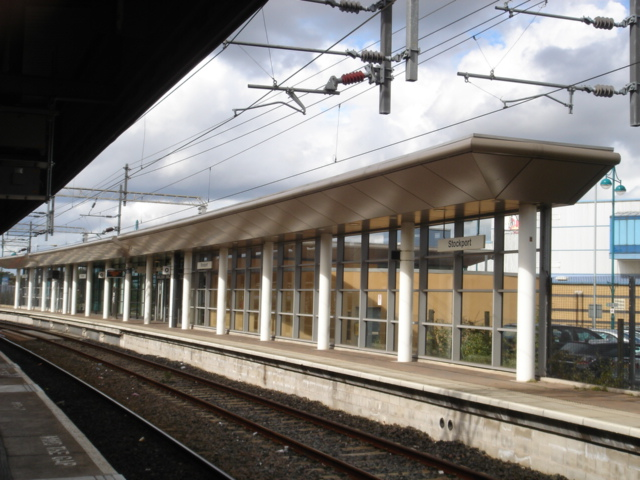
Platform 0 in 2007

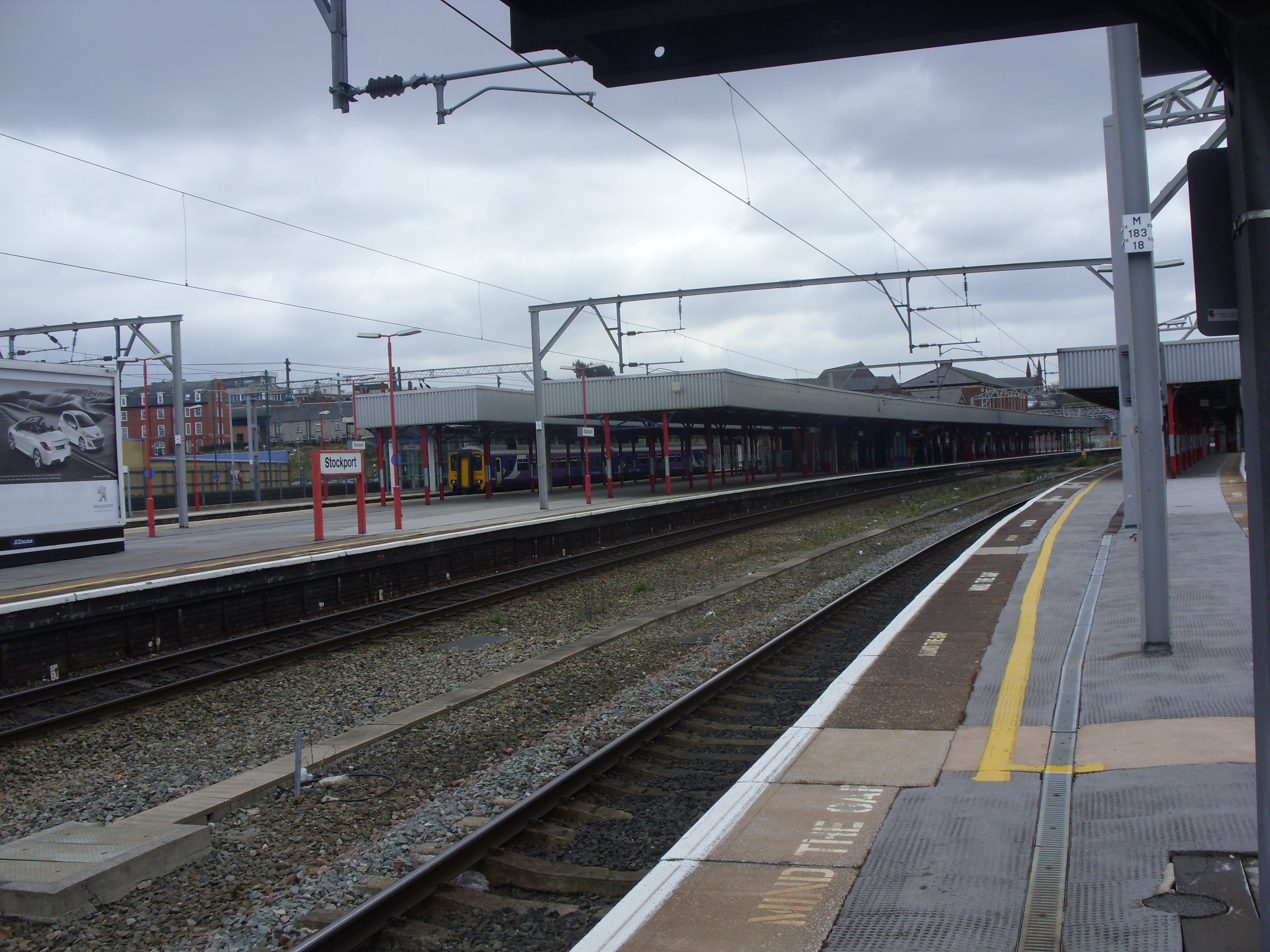
Platforms 2 and 3, 2010

There are six platforms:

- 0 — southbound services to Hazel Grove, Buxton, Sheffield, Norwich, Nottingham and Cleethorpes
- 1 — southbound stopping services to Macclesfield, Crewe, Stoke-on-Trent and Alderley Edge. It is also signalled for use by trains in the Manchester direction
- 2 — southbound main line services to South Wales, London, Bristol, Bournemouth and Paignton; it is also sometimes used for local services Stoke-on-Trent, Chester, Alderley Edge and Crewe
- 3 — northbound main line services to Manchester Piccadilly
- 3a — used by the weekly parliamentary train to/from Stalybridge
- 4 — northbound stopping services to Manchester Piccadilly and main line services to Liverpool Lime Street.

== Service ==
Stockport is served by six train operating companies; the typical off-peak service pattern in trains per hour/day/week (tph/tpd/tpw) is:

Avanti West Coast:

- 3 tph to Manchester Piccadilly
- 3 tph to London Euston; of which:
  - 1 tph calls at Macclesfield, Stoke-on-Trent, Rugby and Milton Keynes Central
  - 1 tph calls at Stoke-on-Trent and Nuneaton
  - 1 tph calls at Wilmslow, Crewe and Stafford.

CrossCountry:

- 2 tph to Manchester Piccadilly
- 1 tph to Bournemouth, via Macclesfield, Birmingham New Street and Reading
- 1 tph to Bristol Temple Meads, via Macclesfield and Birmingham New Street; of which:
  - 2tpd continue to Paignton, via Exeter St Davids.

East Midlands Railway:

- 1 tph to Liverpool Lime Street, via Warrington Central
- 1 tph to Norwich, via Sheffield and Nottingham.

Northern Trains:

- 6 tph to Manchester Piccadilly
- 1 tph to Alderley Edge
- 1 tph to Crewe
- 1 tph to Hazel Grove
- 1 tph to Buxton, via Hazel Grove
- 1 tph to Chester
- 1 tph to Stoke-on-Trent
- 1 tpw to Stalybridge, via Reddish South, Denton and Guide Bridge.

TransPennine Express:

- 1 tph to Cleethorpes
- 1 tph to Liverpool Lime Street, via Warrington Central.

Transport for Wales Rail:

- 1 tph to Manchester Piccadilly
- 1 tph to Cardiff Central, via Crewe and Shrewsbury; alternate services continue to Carmarthen, Milford Haven or Pembroke Dock.

Preceding station	National Rail	Following station
Macclesfield	Avanti West Coast West Coast Main Line	Manchester Piccadilly
Stoke-on-Trent	Avanti West Coast West Coast Main Line	Manchester Piccadilly
Wilmslow	Avanti West Coast West Coast Main Line	Manchester Piccadilly
Wilmslow	Transport for Wales Rail Welsh Marches Line	Manchester Piccadilly
Macclesfield	CrossCountry CrossCountry Route	Manchester Piccadilly
Sheffield	East Midlands Railway Liverpool Lime Street to Norwich	Manchester Piccadilly
Dore and Totley Limited service	East Midlands Railway Liverpool Lime Street to Norwich	Manchester Piccadilly
Chinley Limited service	East Midlands Railway Liverpool Lime Street to Norwich	Manchester Piccadilly
Hazel Grove Limited service	East Midlands Railway Liverpool Lime Street to Norwich	Manchester Piccadilly
Sheffield	TransPennine Express South TransPennine	Manchester Piccadilly
Dore & Totley Limited service	TransPennine Express South TransPennine	Manchester Piccadilly
Navigation Road	Northern Trains Mid-Cheshire line	Manchester Piccadilly
Cheadle Hulme	Northern Trains Stoke-on-Trent to Manchester Piccadilly	Manchester Piccadilly
Cheadle Hulme	Northern Trains Crewe–Manchester line	Heaton Chapel
Cheadle Hulme	Northern Trains Crewe–Manchester line	Manchester Piccadilly
Davenport	Northern Trains Buxton line	Heaton Chapel
Chinley	Northern Trains Hope Valley Line Limited service	Manchester Piccadilly
Hazel Grove	Northern Trains Hope Valley Line Limited service	Manchester Piccadilly
Terminus	Northern Trains Stockport–Stalybridge line Saturdays only	Reddish South
	Previous services	
Congleton	CrossCountry Cross Country Route Peak hours only	Manchester Piccadilly

== Non-stopping trains ==
It has been claimed that Stockport Viaduct was built on condition that all passenger trains using it were required to stop at Stockport station. Local MP Andrew Gwynne commissioned research into the issue and reported "Sadly no such Act of Parliament exists, although it is common currency in the town that it does. I made enquiries with the House of Commons Library and the Parliamentary Archives back at the time some inter-city trains stopped using Stockport. It appears it is purely an urban myth."

== Interchange with other transport modes ==
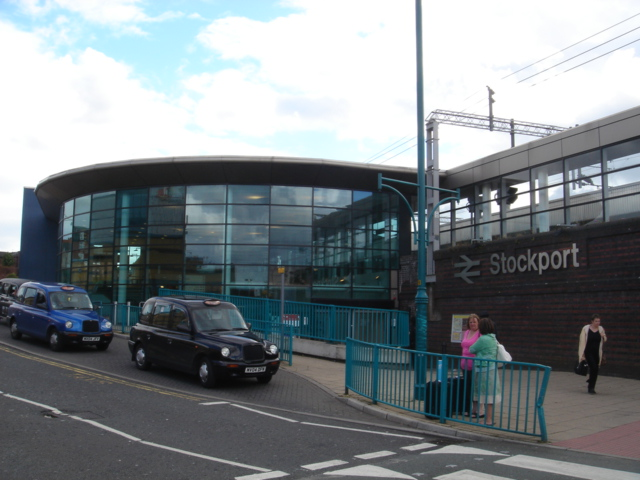
Main entrance, showing the taxi rank (left foreground) in 2007

=== Buses ===
The bus stops immediately outside the main station entrance were previously served by the Metroshuttle free bus service; this service was withdrawn in 2019. These are only now used for rail replacement bus services.

The station is a short walk from Stockport Interchange, which was constructed on the site of the former bus station, and was opened for passengers on 17 March 2024. A bridge to improve the walking route between the two facilities was built as part of the development.

Passengers can also use the bus stops on the nearby Wellington Road, which are well-served by routes that are operated mostly by Stagecoach Manchester; these include the 192 between Manchester Piccadilly and Hazel Grove.

=== Taxis ===
Passengers can board taxis from the taxi rank located immediately outside the station entrance.

=== Tram ===
Stockport Interchange

General information
- Location: Stockport, Metropolitan Borough of Stockport, England
- Coordinates: 53.405°N 2.1628°W
- System: Metrolink station

Other information
- Status: Proposed station
Location

An extension to the Manchester Metrolink line from East Didsbury to Stockport was planned in 2004 and the Greater Manchester Passenger Transport Executive applied for powers to build it. The project came to a halt when the Big Bang extension was stopped due to the loss of potential funding.

On 4 June 2025, Chancellor of the Exchequer Rachel Reeves announced £2.5 billion in funding for Greater Manchester, some of which will be used to extend the Metrolink network into the town centre. Labour MP for Stockport Navendu Mishra said "the details around the project were yet to be figured out."

== In popular culture ==
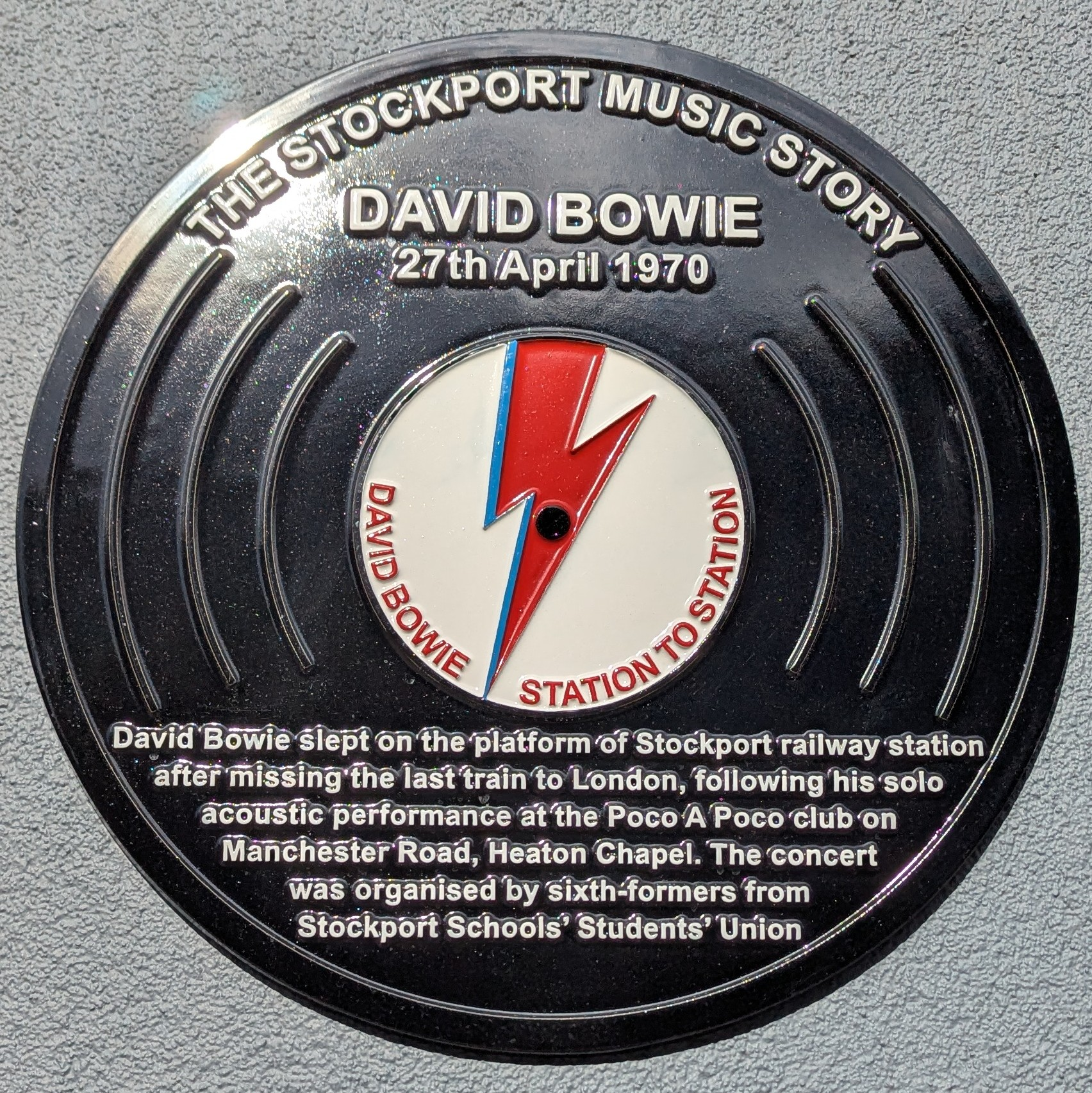
A plaque commemorating the night David Bowie slept on the platform in 1970

A plaque commemorating the night David Bowie slept on the platform was unveiled on 27 April 2025. He had missed the last train to London, following his performance at the Poco A Poco club in Heaton Chapel on 27 April 1970.

== See also ==
- Stockport Tiviot Dale railway station
