= Guide Bridge railway station =

Railway station in Greater Manchester, England

Guide Bridge
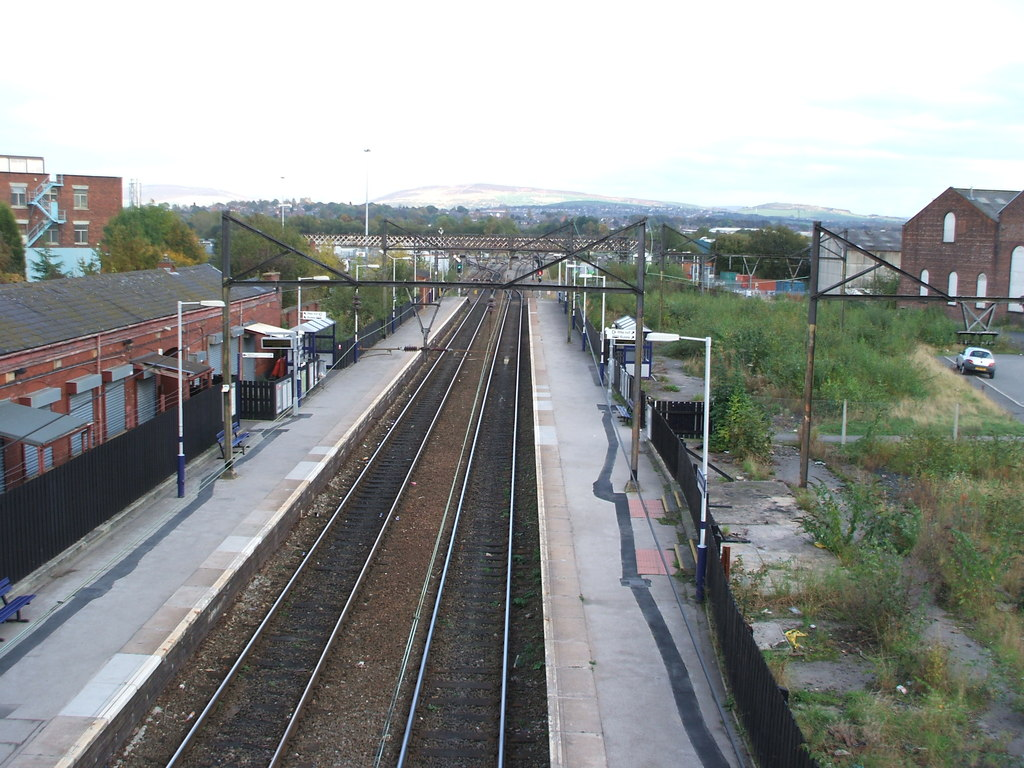
- The station in 2009

General information
- Location: Guide Bridge, Tameside, England
- Coordinates: 53°28′29.12″N 2°6′50.83″W
- Grid reference: SJ925975
- Managed by: Northern Trains
- Platforms: 2

Other information
- Station code: GUI
- Classification: DfT category E

History
- Opened: 1841
- Original company: Sheffield, Ashton-under-Lyne and Manchester Railway
- Pre-grouping: Great Central Railway
- Post-grouping: London and North Eastern Railway

Passengers
- 2020/21: ▼75,418
- Interchange: ▼1,533
- 2021/22: ▲0.204 million
- Interchange: ▲3,611
- 2022/23: ▲0.219 million
- Interchange: ▼3,382
- 2023/24: ▲0.245 million
- Interchange: ▲4,775
- 2024/25: ▲0.268 million
- Interchange: ▼4,530
Location
Notes
- Passenger statistics from the Office of Rail and Road

Guide Bridge railway station serves the Guide Bridge area of Audenshaw, in Greater Manchester, England. It lies 4 3/4 miles (7.6 km) east of Manchester Piccadilly, on both the Glossop Line and the Hyde loop of the Hope Valley Line. The station is managed by Northern Trains, which also operates all services that stop here.

== History ==
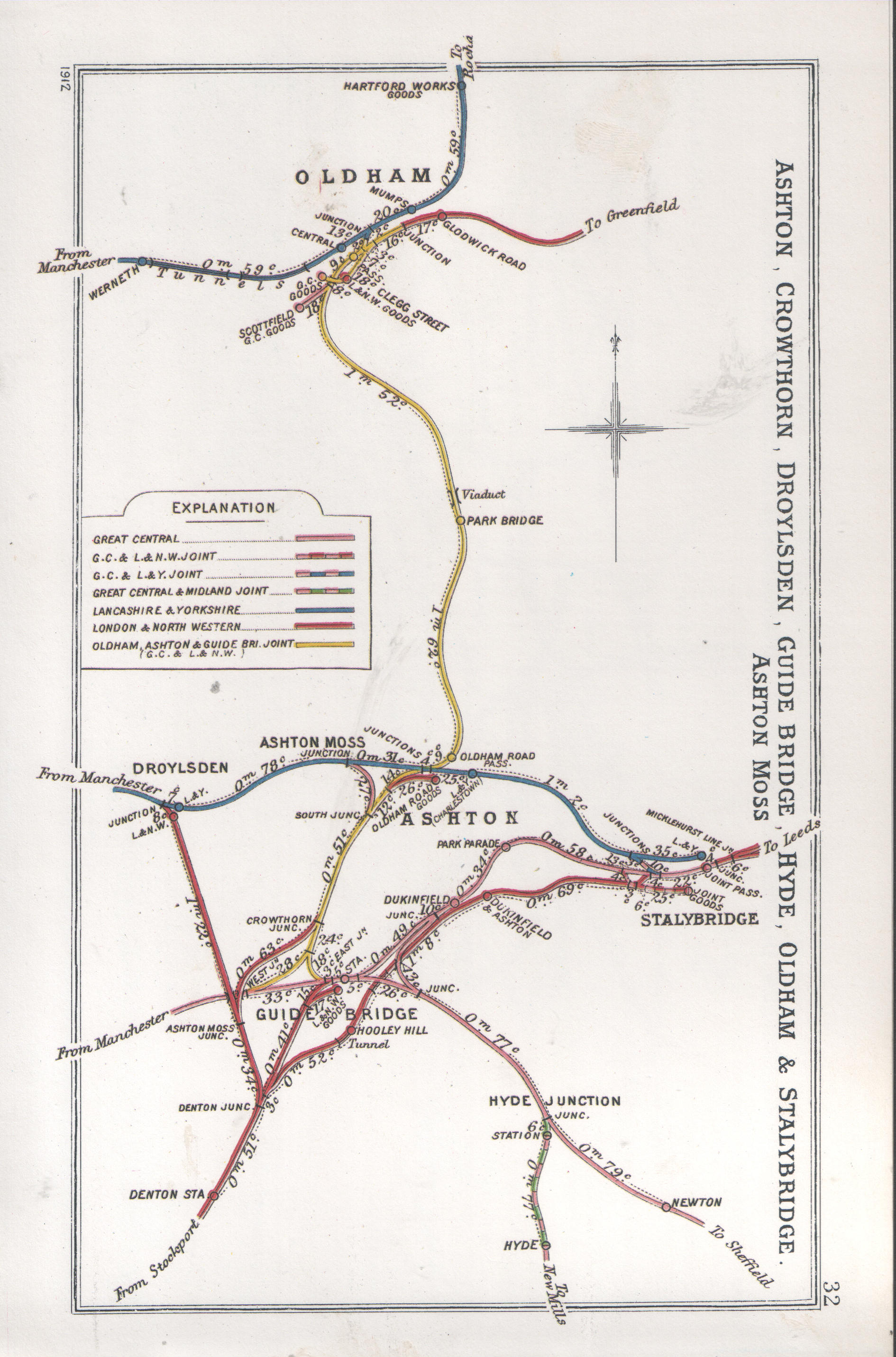
Guide Bridge junction in its 1912 context

The station was built by the Sheffield, Ashton-under-Lyne and Manchester Railway on its new line from Ardwick Junction, near to the Manchester and Birmingham Railway's terminus at Manchester Store Street, to Sheffield Victoria; it opened as Ashton and Hooley Hill on 11 November 1841, when the line opened as far as Godley Toll Bar. It was renamed Ashton in February 1842 and became Guide Bridge on 14 July 1845, when the line was extended to Sheffield.

The station had a four-platform configuration originally, with a large office on the southern side. However, the southern (former slow line) platforms were decommissioned and the tracks were lifted in 1984–85; this was part of layout alterations associated with the changeover from 1500 V DC to 25 kV AC working on the Hadfield line, with demolition of the buildings following a few years later. The area has been covered, with a section forming part of the car park, but some evidence remains of the previous two tracks. The junction at the country end of the station was also remodelled in 2011 to allow Stockport-Stalybridge Line trains to cross the junction at up to 30 mph (48 km/h), rather than at 15 mph (24 km/h) as it was previously.

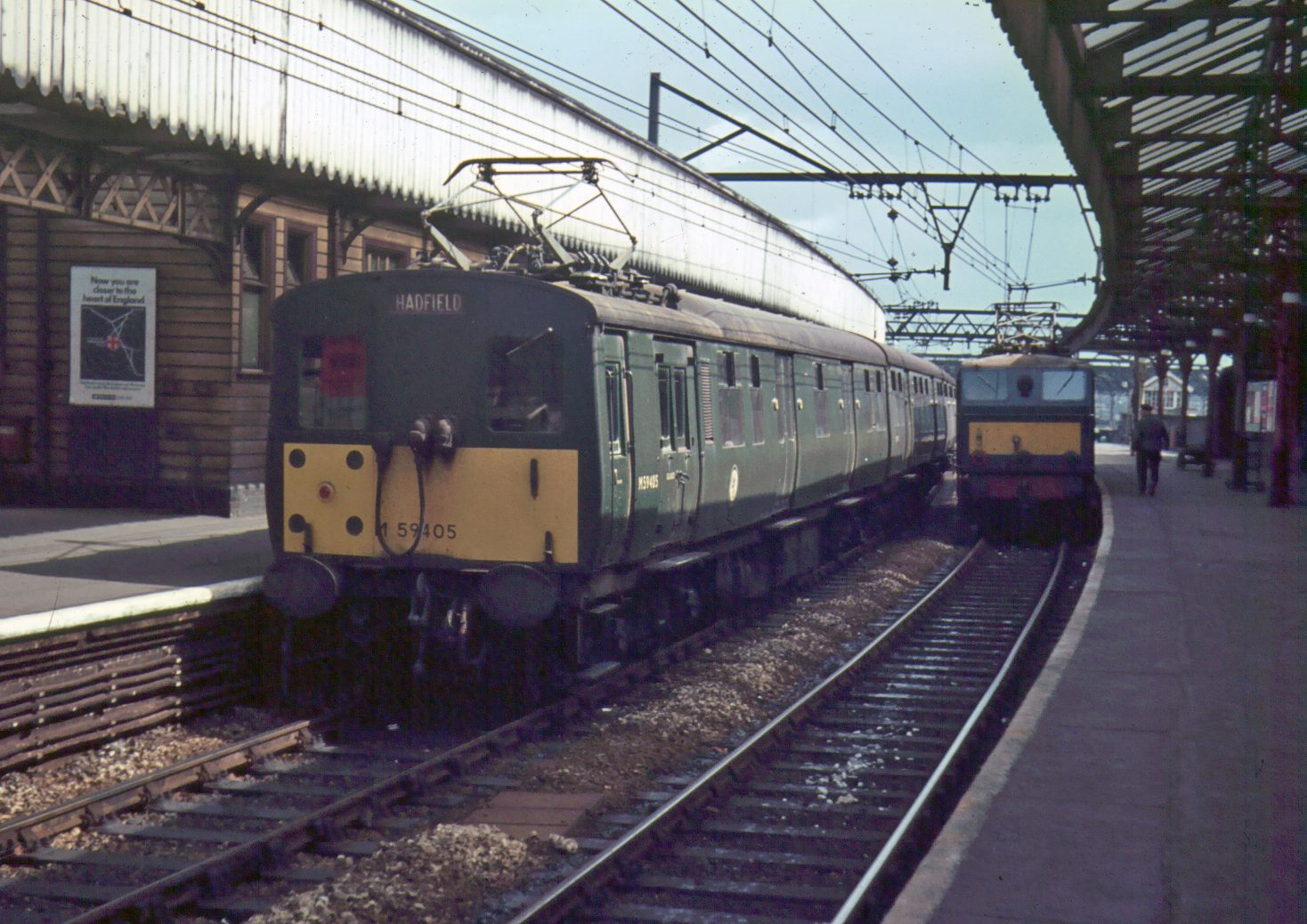
Guide Bridge station in 1967

With the electrification of the Woodhead Line between Manchester and Sheffield in the early 1950s, Guide Bridge, which was already a major centre of railway operations, increased in importance. Express trains called here, as well as electric multiple units between Manchester London Road and the north Derbyshire towns of Glossop and Hadfield. There were also diesel multiple unit-operated services from London Road to Macclesfield, via Rose Hill Marple, which closed south of Rose Hill in January 1970; Stockport Edgeley to Stalybridge; and to Oldham, via the Oldham, Ashton & Guide Bridge Railway, which closed to passengers in 1959.

The station was also where express services changed locomotives to and from Manchester Central, on the Great Central Main Line route to London Marylebone. Drawn by a Bo-Bo or Co-Co electric locomotive from Sheffield, a steam engine, or diesel locomotive in later years, would take the train the final few miles to/from Manchester Central. The Woodhead Line was busy with goods traffic, especially with coal traffic from South Yorkshire to Lancashire power stations. The station also accepted goods under British Railways' Passenger freight service and had a licensed buffet.

There was a large marshalling yard about 1 mile (1.6 km) east of Guide Bridge at Dewsnap, with a stabling point immediately to the east of the station, where engines could be refuelled. Guide Bridge was also where the local retail coal merchants transferred coal from British Rail coal wagons, carefully weighed into one hundredweight sacks for delivery to homes around Ashton, Audenshaw and Denton.

Express passenger trains via the Woodhead line ceased operation on 5 January 1970, but Dewsnap sidings and Guide Bridge stabling point were busy until the full closure of the Woodhead Line east of Hadfield on 20 July 1981. The Class 76 electric locomotives were a frequent sight here, along with Class 25 and Class 40 diesel locomotives.

Arriva Trains Northern had plans to establish Guide Bridge as a major interchange station, coupled with hopes that the Woodhead line might reopen. Such aspirations failed to materialise when First TransPennine Express took over the franchise.

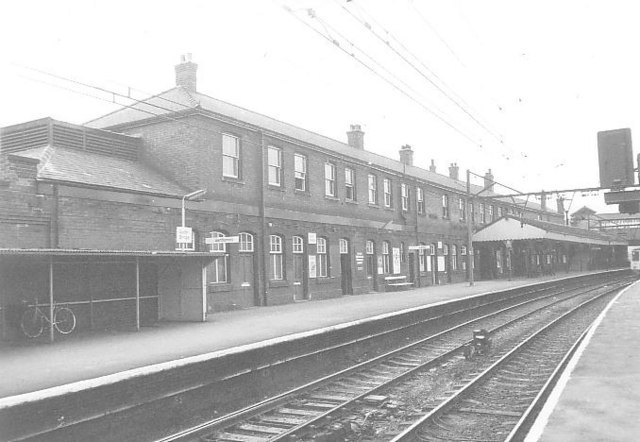
The southern platforms and station building in 1977; these have since been demolished

On 22 October 2006, a fire gutted the waiting room, footbridge and ticket office. The fire was attributed subsequently to arson and caused around £1 million of damage to the station, necessitating the demolition of the footbridge. This has not been rebuilt, so a lengthy walk out of the station and along the adjacent main road to change platforms is required.

In January 2009, the previously free car parking was abolished, with a daily charge of £3 being introduced. As a result, the once busy car park largely fell quiet. A subsequent review was taken, following complaints from neighbouring residents, with backing of local councillors; it investigated the redistribution of cars once parked on the ample station facility to the surrounding residential streets, with charging dismissed soon afterwards.

=== Parliamentary service ===
The station also lies on the Stockport-Stalybridge line, which used to be an hourly operation. It was almost entirely withdrawn in 1989, when trans-Pennine services between Manchester and Leeds were rerouted from Manchester Victoria to serve Manchester Piccadilly. In 2004, there was a 16:08 Fridays-only service from Stalybridge to Guide Bridge, whilst weekend engineering work was taking place in the Stockport area.

Subsequent to this, the once-weekly parliamentary train on the route operated in the other direction; it left Stockport at 9:22 and calling at 9:37, on Fridays only. This train was also unusual in that it arrived at Guide Bridge on the Manchester-bound platform before changing tracks after departure. Since the start of the summer 2018 timetable on 20 May, the service on this route has operated on Saturdays instead of Fridays, with a return working introduced. From the December 2023 timetable, it departs Guide Bridge at 08:37 for Stockport and arrives back at 09:19.

== Facilities ==
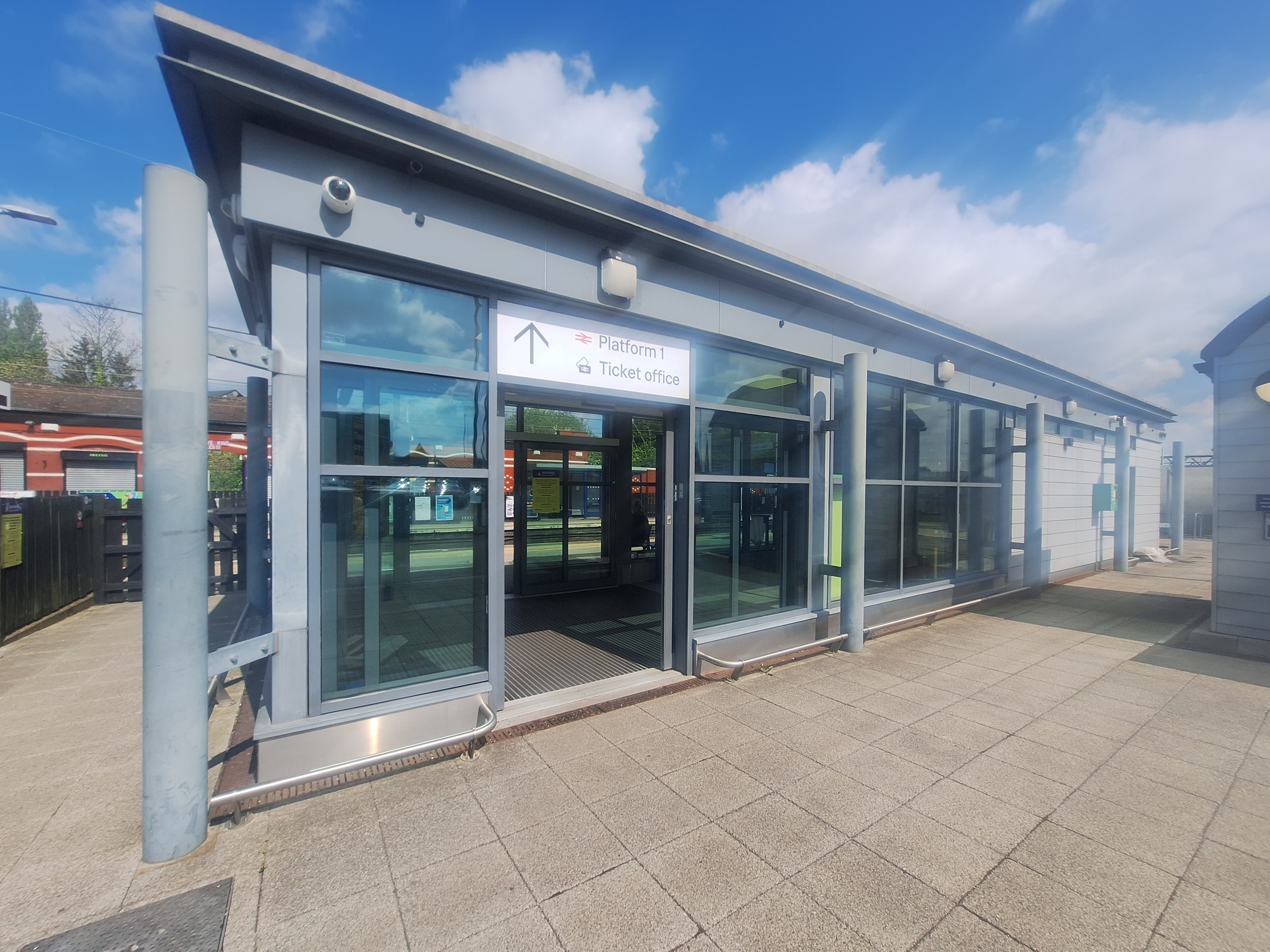
Ticket office

A new single-storey ticket office was commissioned in December 2014; it was built on the former island platform (now platform 1), as part of a £1.7 million revamp of the station. Improved lighting, an extended car park to 140 spaces, CCTV cameras and bicycle storage lockers were also provided. The new facilities were opened officially by the Minister of State for Transport, Baroness Kramer.

The ticket office is open Monday to Saturday daytimes. The station also provides seating, shelters, toilets and a passenger information system.

== Services ==
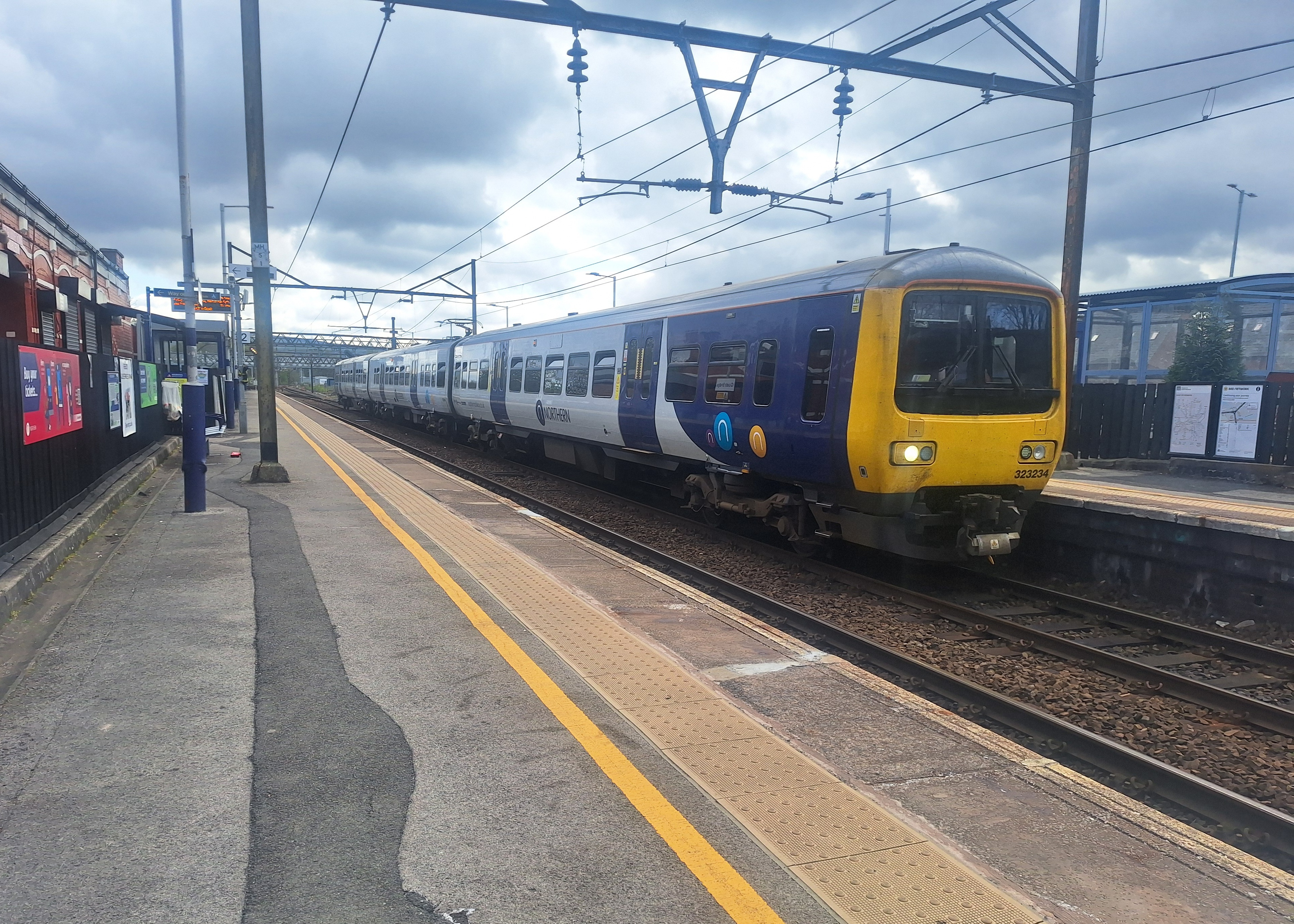
A Northern Trains Class 323 calling at the westbound platform

The general off-peak service at Guide Bridge consists of the following, in trains per hour/week (tph/tpw):

Glossop Line:

- 2 tph to Hadfield, via Glossop
- 2 tph to Manchester Piccadilly.

Hope Valley Line (Hyde Loop):

- 3 tp2h to Rose Hill Marple
- 3 tp2h to Manchester Piccadilly.

Stockport to Stalybridge Line:

- 1 tpw to Stockport
- 1 tpw to Stalybridge.

On Sundays, the service on the Glossop Line remains at 2 tph, but there is no service on the Hope Valley Line.

Preceding station	National Rail	Following station
Hyde North	Northern Trains Hope Valley Line (Mondays-Saturdays only)	Fairfield
Flowery Field	Northern Trains Glossop line	Ashburys
Flowery Field	Northern Trains Glossop line	Gorton
Denton	Northern Trains Stockport–Stalybridge line (Saturdays only)	Stalybridge

== Woodhead line museum ==
In August 2023, it was revealed that the Woodhead Railway Heritage Group has submitted plans to create a museum to celebrate the Manchester to Sheffield railway. The museum is housed in a former signalling and telecommunications building at the station. Network Rail has been carrying out renovation work on the building since 2020.
