= Richard W. Littlefield =

American politician

Richard W. Littlefield, Jr.

Member of the Georgia State Senate from the 6th district
- In office 1979–1982
- Preceded by: Roscoe E. Dean
- Succeeded by: Riley Reddish

Personal details
- Born: September 17, 1948 Duval County, Florida, U.S.
- Died: April 27, 2012 (aged 63)
- Party: Democratic
- Spouse(s): Lorraine Teresa Nelson; Elizabeth Ann Carter; Beverly Cheney
- Children: 3
- Education: Emory University; University of Georgia

Richard W. Littlefield, Jr. (September 17, 1948 – April 27, 2012) was an American politician. He served as a Democratic member for the 6th district of the Georgia State Senate.

== Life and career ==
Littlefield was born in Duval County, Florida. He attended Emory University and the University of Georgia.

Littlefield was an assistant district attorney for the Brunswick Judicial Circuit. In 1979, he was elected to represent the 6th district of the Georgia State Senate, succeeding Roscoe E. Dean. He served until 1982.

Littlefield died in April 2012 of heart failure, at the age of 63.
