= Riley Reddish =

American politician (1933–2008)

Member of the Georgia State Senate from the 6th district
- In office May 23, 1983 – January 12, 1987
- Preceded by: Richard W. Littlefield
- Succeeded by: Earl Echols

Personal details
- Born: December 26, 1933 Wayne County, Georgia, U.S.
- Died: April 1, 2008 (aged 74)
- Party: Democratic
- Education: Georgia Southern College

Riley Reddish (December 22, 1933 – April 1, 2008) was an American politician. He served as a Democratic member for the 6th district of the Georgia State Senate.

== Life and career ==
Reddish was born in Wayne County, Georgia. He attended Georgia Southern College.

Reddish was a Wayne County sheriff.

In 1983, Reddish was elected to represent the 6th district of the Georgia State Senate.

Reddish died on April 1, 2008, at the age of 74.
