= Stockport–Stalybridge line =

Railway line in Greater Manchester, England

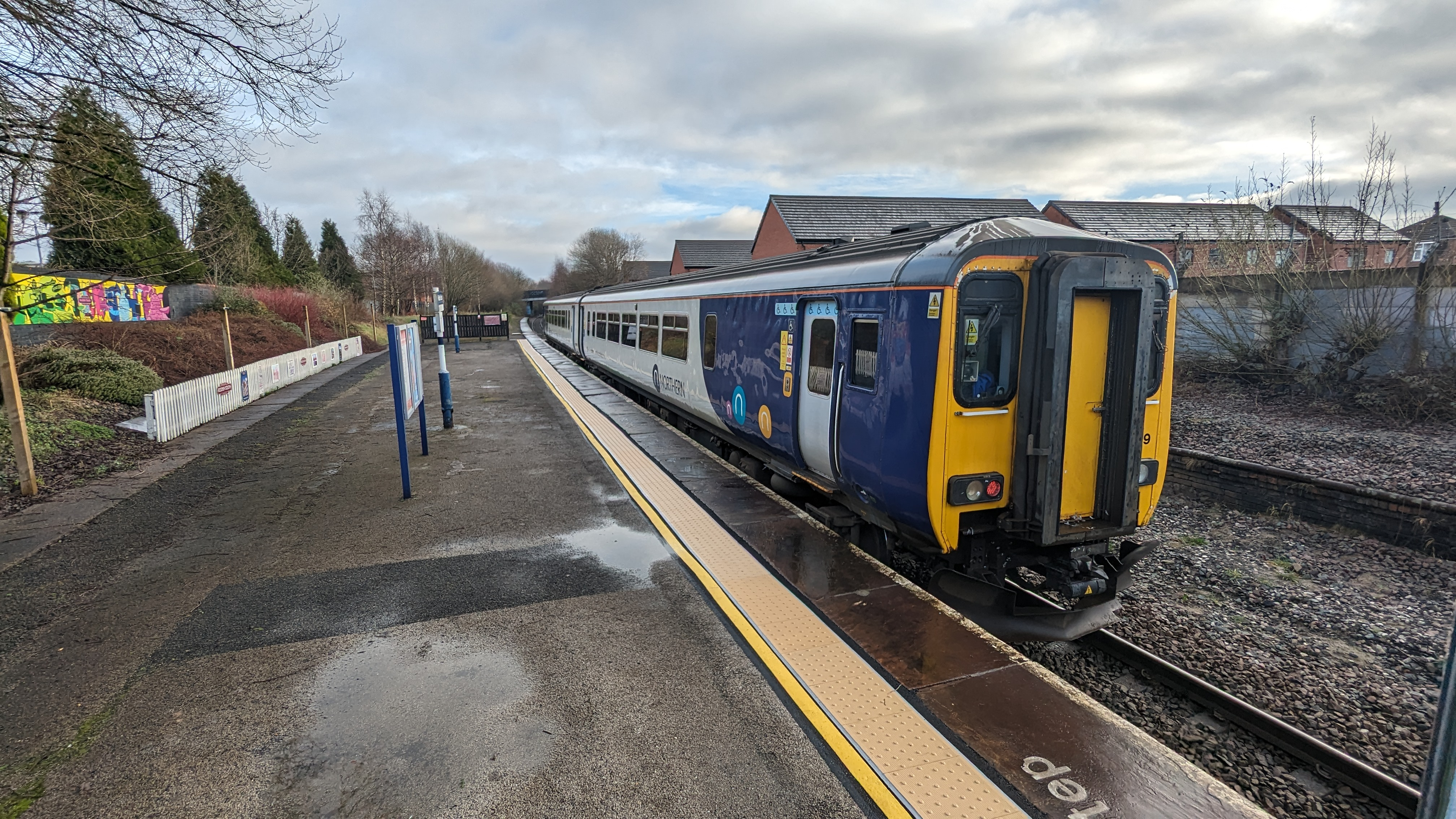
- A Class 156 diesel multiple unit at Reddish South

Overview
- Status: Operational
- Owner: Network Rail
- Locale: Greater Manchester
- Termini: Stockport, Stalybridge
- Stations: Reddish South, Denton, Guide Bridge

Service
- Type: Heavy rail
- System: National Rail
- Operator(s): Northern Trains

Technical
- Line length: 8.14 mi (13.10 km)
- Track gauge: 1,435 mm (4 ft 8 1/2 in) standard gauge
- Electrification: 25 kV 50 Hz AC OLE under construction
Route map
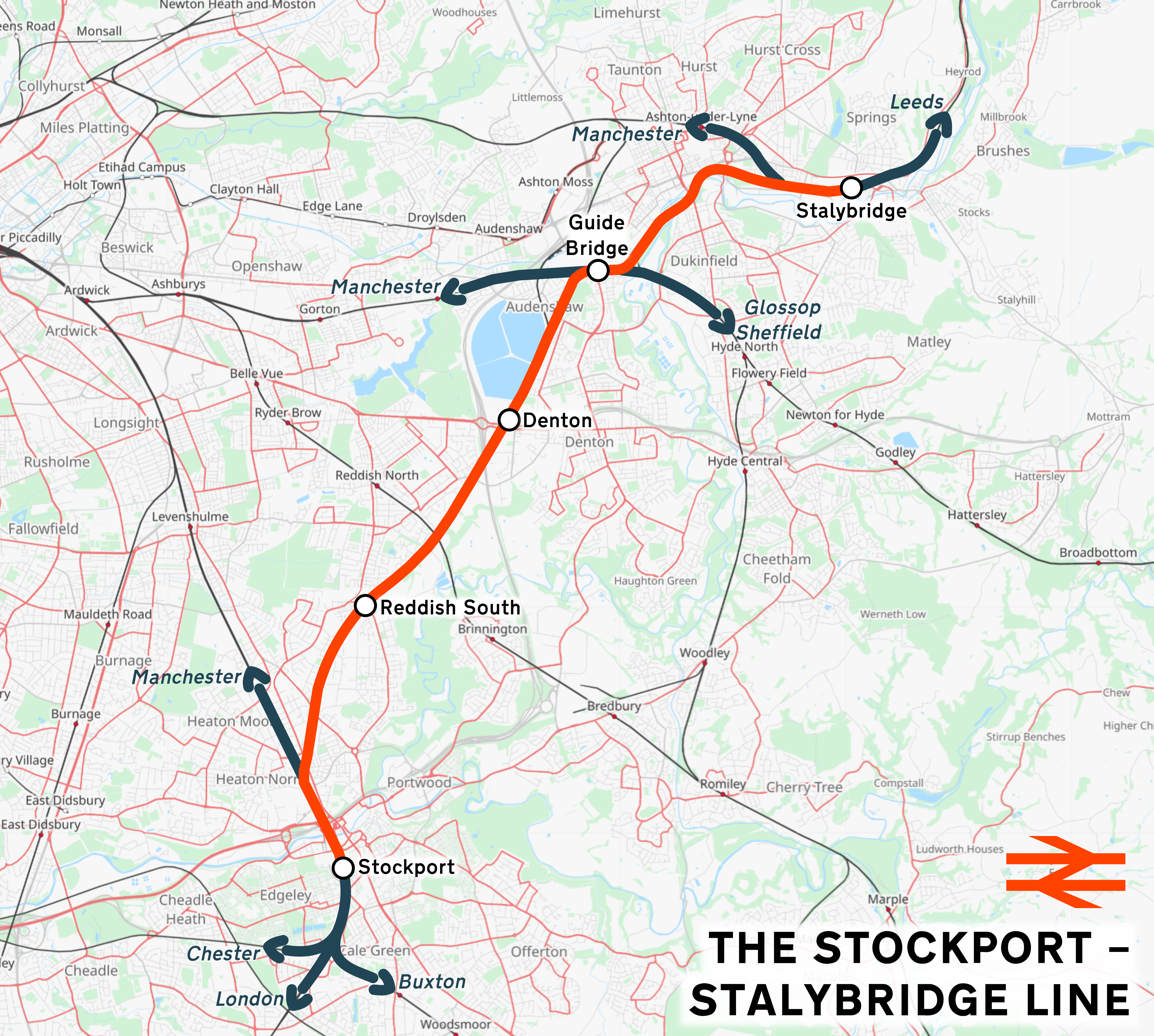
(Click to expand)

The Stockport–Stalybridge line is a railway line in Greater Manchester, England. It runs north-east from Stockport to Stalybridge, via Guide Bridge. The line is used mainly by freight and empty stock workings, although it once had a frequent passenger service. In 1992, the service pattern reduced to a single weekly passenger train but, in 2018, this was increased to twice a week with one service in each direction on Saturday mornings. Services are operated by Northern Trains, usually with a Class 150 or Class 156 diesel multiple unit. The line is intended to be electrified as part of the Transpennine Route Upgrade.

== History ==
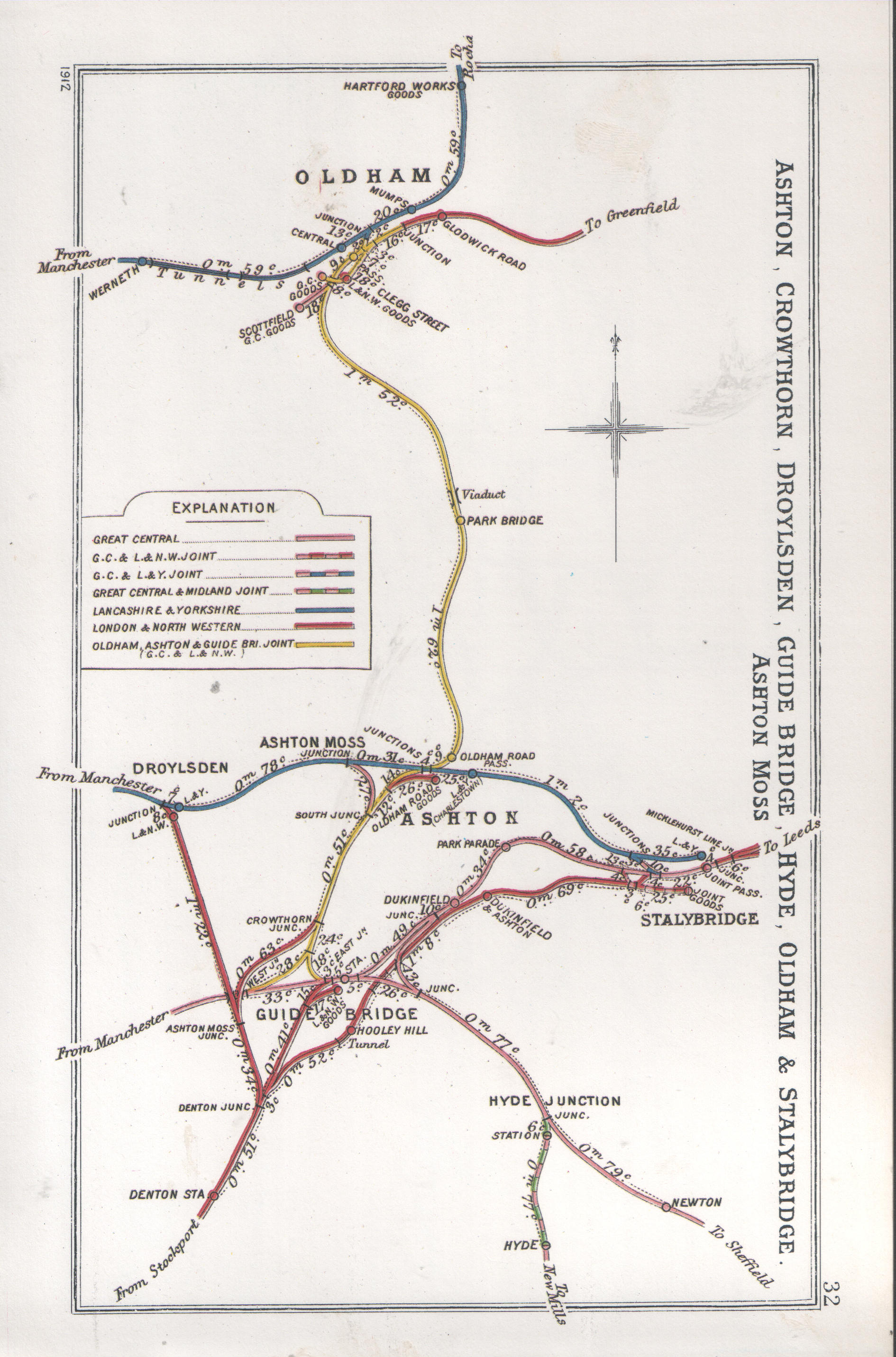
A 1912 map of railways around Guide Bridge and Stalybridge. The Stockport–Stalybridge line is the red line entering the diagram from the bottom left.

The southern stretch of the line between Stockport and Guide Bridge was built by the Manchester and Birmingham Railway, at around the time of its merger into the London and North Western Railway (LNWR). The contract was let to John Brogden and Sons in October 1845.

The northern section from Guide Bridge to Stalybridge was built by the Sheffield, Ashton-under-Lyne and Manchester Railway in 1845. This later became part of the Manchester, Sheffield and Lincolnshire Railway (MS&LR).

=== Guide Bridge avoiding line ===
Congestion around Guide Bridge led to the LNWR building a new line to avoid the station. Known as the Stalybridge Junction Railway, it ran from Denton Junction, then under the MS&LR main line east of Guide Bridge, parallel to the existing Guide Bridge-Stalybridge line, before joining the main line again just west of Stalybridge station. As well as relieving congestion, it also had the advantage of allowing LNWR trains to bypass MS&LR tracks altogether. The line was completed in 1893, with stations at Hooley Hill and Dukinfield and Ashton. A local Stockport-Stalybridge passenger service ran on this line until 25 September 1950. The line was closed completely in 1968 and was dismantled in the early 1970s. As it ran mostly on brick viaducts, which have since been demolished, little physical trace now remains of the line.

== Route ==
The line serves the following stations:

- Stockport
- Reddish South
- Denton
- Guide Bridge
- Stalybridge.

== Parliamentary service ==
This minimal service, termed a parliamentary train for historical reasons, avoids the official procedures of terminating a passenger service. The rerouteing of trans-Pennine express services from Leeds to Manchester Piccadilly and Manchester Victoria in May 1989 removed the main reason for its passenger service; passengers, who formerly used the Stalybridge–Stockport shuttle to avoid the need to change stations in Manchester, could travel via Manchester Piccadilly and change there instead. The service was reduced initially to five trains per day (three in one direction and two the other) but, by 1992, had been cut to its then-minimal level of one a week. The northern part of the route, from Guide Bridge to Stalybridge, is now used by the rerouted express services between Leeds and Manchester Piccadilly.

The scarcity of services on the line has led to it becoming popular with rail enthusiasts, as well as real ale connoisseurs visiting the station buffet at Stalybridge.

== Closure proposal ==
Network Rail, in their Route Utilisation Strategy (RUS) for the North West, proposed closure of Reddish South and Denton stations and withdrawal of the remaining passenger service. The report noted however that the cost of withdrawing the service (e.g. closure notices, dealing with objections) would be greater than the costs of operating the weekly service (Network Rail, in their North Western RUS, noted that the cost of each trip was just £96). The line itself would have remained open for empty stock transfers, freight and diverted passenger workings. The threat was withdrawn in May 2007, possibly temporarily, when GMPTE suggested it was to support three trains per hour between Stockport and Manchester Victoria.

In September 2006, Grand Central, an open access train operating company, had proposed using the line for passenger services between London Euston and Bradford Interchange, via the West Coast Main Line, using Stockport, Guide Bridge and Stalybridge stations as stops. These proposals were withdrawn in August 2008, with a service later introduced from Bradford Interchange to London King's Cross via the East Coast Main Line instead.

== Service ==
Before May 2018, the service operated in one direction only, on a Friday morning, leaving Stockport at 09:22 and arriving in Stalybridge at 09:42 (with train reporting number 2J45).

In the 20 May 2018 timetable changes, Northern Trains introduced a second (return) journey on the line, as well as shifting the day of operation to Saturday, meaning that Reddish South and Denton received a timetabled passenger services in both directions for the first time since 1992. In the December 2022 timetable, the first train departs from Stalybridge at 08:30 and arrives in Stockport at 08:59, with train reporting number 2J44. The train then makes a return journey leaving Stockport at 09:04 and arriving in Stalybridge at 09:28, with train reporting number 2J45. These services operate every Saturday and call at the intermediate stations in both directions.

== Reinstatement of regular passenger services ==
In March 2020, a bid was made to the Restoring Your Railway fund to pay for a feasibility study into reinstating services on the Stockport to Ashton via Denton Junction section of the line. This bid was unsuccessful. In October 2021, it was announced by the UK government that a further bid to the third round of the Restoring Your Railway fund was successful, seeing up to £50,000 contributed towards developing early stage proposals. The bid proposes either reinstatement of heavy rail services to Manchester Victoria or a light rail service extending from the existing Manchester Metrolink East Manchester Line terminus at Ashton-under-Lyne.
