= Reddish South railway station =

Railway station in Greater Manchester, England

Reddish South
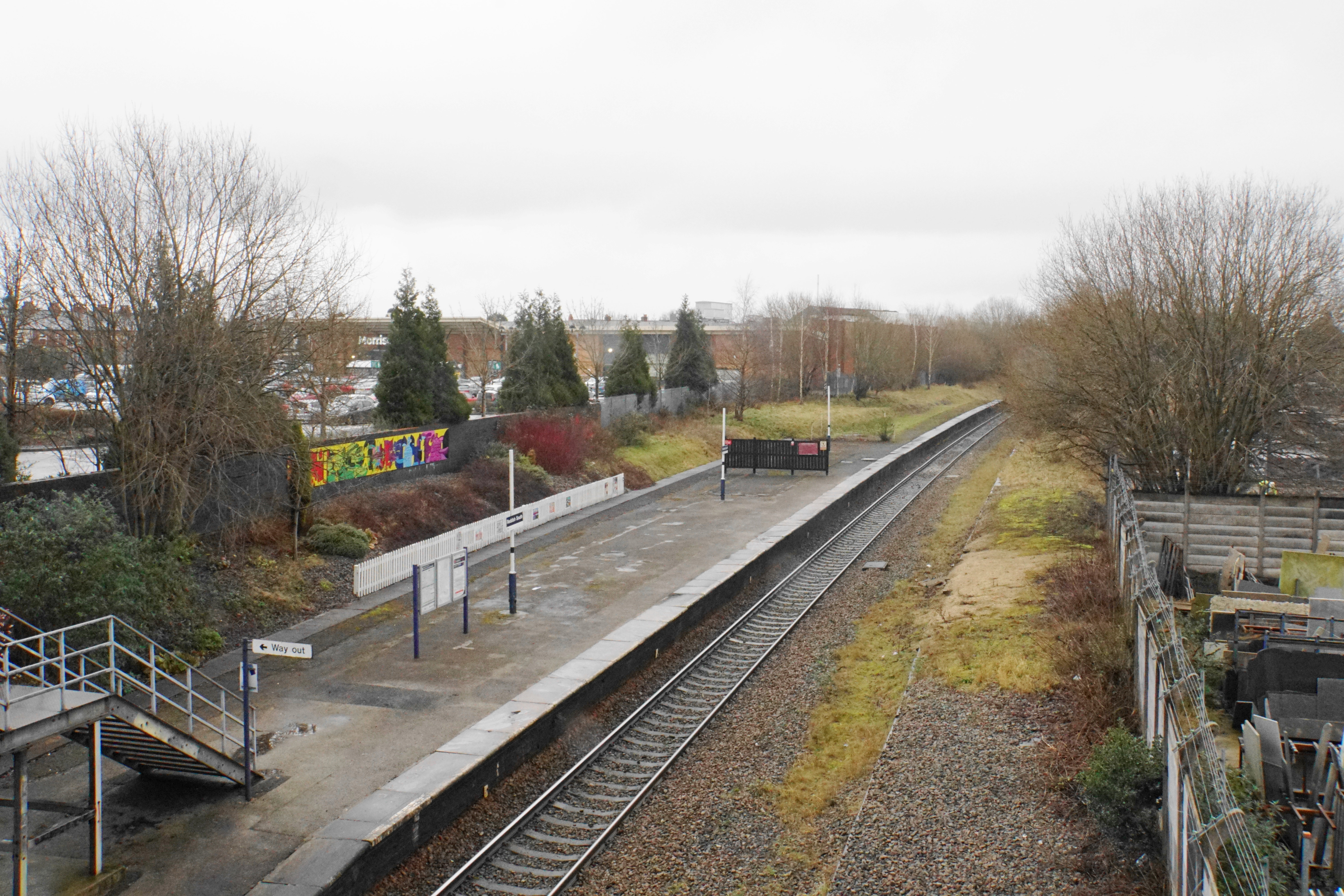
- The station in 2020

General information
- Location: Reddish, Metropolitan Borough of Stockport, England
- Coordinates: 53.4361°N 2.1580°W
- Grid reference: SJ895932
- Manager: Northern Trains
- Transit authority: Transport for Greater Manchester
- Platforms: 1

Other information
- Station code: RDS
- Classification: DfT category F2

History
- Opened: 1849 or 1852

Passengers
- 2021/22: ▲108
- 2022/23: ▼100
- 2023/24: ▲128
- 2024/25: ▼102
- 2025/26: ▼94
Location
Notes
- Passenger statistics from the Office of Rail and Road

Reddish South railway station is a stop on the Stockport–Stalybridge line. It is one of two serving the town of Reddish, in Greater Manchester, England; the other is Reddish North. It is between Stockport and Denton, 1 mile 50 chains (2.6 km) from Heaton Norris Junction, near Stockport.

The station is one of the quietest on the British railway network; it was used by only 26 passengers in 2013/14. It has been served by parliamentary services since May 1992, in order to avoid a formal proceeding to close the line.

== History ==
Reddish South was opened by the London and North Western Railway (LNWR) in either 1845 or 1849. It first appeared in the public timetable in 1852. It originally opened as Reddish, but was renamed to Reddish South in September 1952. The station once had two island platforms, although has now been reduced to using a single side of one of the islands. Services were gradually reduced over time, with express services terminating in Manchester rather than continuing from Reddish South towards Leeds.

Although the Stockport–Stalybridge line escaped the 1960s Beeching cuts, when large numbers of branch lines across the country were closed for being uneconomical, the station and line were gradually run down by British Rail over the next couple of decades.

In May 2007, Network Rail proposed in its North West Route Utilisation Strategy that both Reddish South and Denton stations should be closed, while the line remain open for freight and diverted passenger workings. This prompted a campaign to start asking for a regular service from Stockport to Manchester Victoria, via Reddish South and Denton.

== Passenger volume ==
Between April 2013 and March 2014, Reddish South was the third-least-used station in Great Britain, after Teesside Airport and Shippea Hill, with only 26 recorded passengers. In 2015, passenger figures from the Office of Rail and Road showed that Reddish South had become Britain's fourth-quietest railway station. In January 2020, the station was named as the Britain's third quietest, with just 60 entries and exits between 1 April 2018 and 31 March 2019. In 2022‐2023, the station had become the fifth least used, with 100 entries and exits. In 2023–24, the station was again the fifth least used, with 128 entries and exits. Between 2025 and 2026, Reddish South became Britain's least-used railway station, recording just 36 journeys to or from the station, equivalent to 94 entries and exits.

In comparison, the neighbouring stations of Reddish North, Heaton Chapel and Brinnington all have regular services.

Passenger volume at Reddish South
	2006–07	2007–08	2008–09	2009–10	2010–11	2011–12	2012–13	2013–14	2014–15	2015–16	2016–17	2017–18	2018–19	2019–20	2020–21	2021–22	2022–23	2023–24	2024–25	2025–26
Entries and exits	120	47	274	76	68	56	122	26	54	38	94	104	60	158	18	108	100	128	102	94

The statistics cover twelve month periods that start in April.

== Services ==
The station is notable for being served by a weekly parliamentary train. For many years from 1992, the only service was the 09:22 Fridays-only parliamentary train from Stockport to Stalybridge; it stopped at Reddish South at 09:26.

On 20 May 2018, Arriva Rail North replaced the Friday service with one return service on Saturday mornings. Northern Trains now operates the service, which departs Reddish South at 08:46 to Stockport, returning at 09:10 for Stalybridge.

Preceding station	National Rail	Following station
Stockport	Northern Trains Stockport–Stalybridge line (Saturdays only)	Denton
	Historical railways	
Heaton Norris	London & North Western Railway; Manchester and Birmingham Railway	Denton

== Community rail ==
The station has an active station friends' group, who campaign for regular services to be reinstated to the station and look after the station. It is also part of the South East Manchester Community Rail Partnership.

== Bibliography ==
- Quick, Michael (2023). Railway Passenger Stations in Great Britain: A Chronology (PDF) (5th ed.). London: Railway and Canal Historical Society.
