= Stalybridge railway station =

Railway station in Greater Manchester, England

Stalybridge
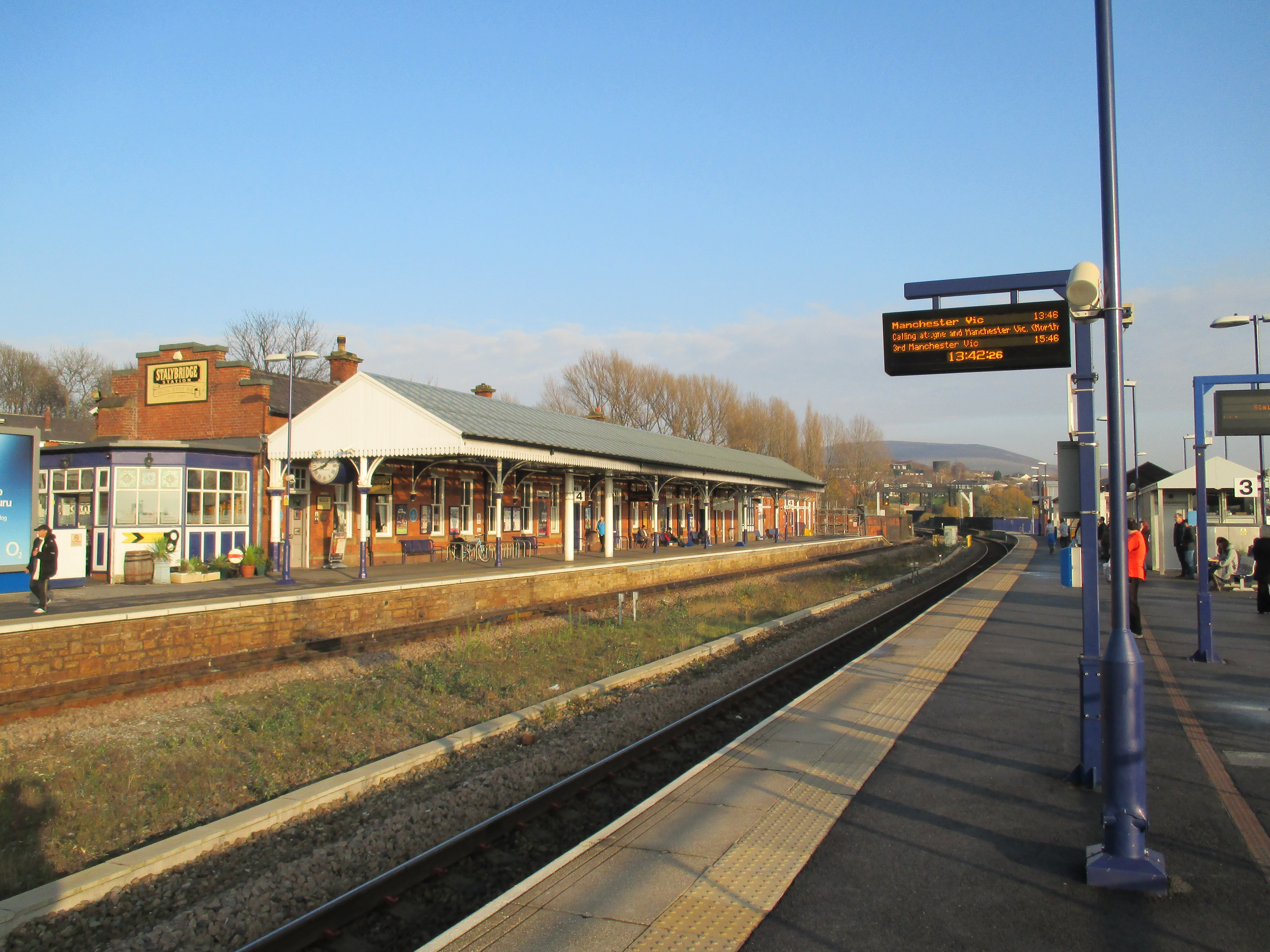
- Stalybridge railway station

General information
- Location: Stalybridge, Metropolitan Borough of Tameside, England
- Coordinates: 53.4841°N 2.0647°W
- Grid reference: SJ958986
- Manager: TransPennine Express
- Transit authority: Transport for Greater Manchester
- Platforms: 5

Other information
- Station code: SYB
- Classification: DfT category D

History
- Opened: 1845

Passengers
- 2020/21: ▼0.264 million
- Interchange: ▼20,372
- 2021/22: ▲0.666 million
- Interchange: ▲82,337
- 2022/23: ▼0.619 million
- Interchange: ▼71,513
- 2023/24: ▲0.673 million
- Interchange: ▼54,344
- 2024/25: ▲0.840 million
- Interchange: ▲54,442
Location
Notes
- Passenger statistics from the Office of Rail and Road

Stalybridge railway station serves the town of Stalybridge, in Greater Manchester, England. It lies on the Huddersfield Line, 7 1/2 miles (12.1 km) east of Manchester Piccadilly and 8 1/4 miles (13.3 km) east of Manchester Victoria. The station is managed by TransPennine Express, which also operates services along with Northern Trains.

== History ==
=== Toponymy ===
At first, Quick (2022) reports that the station was called "a glorious mixture of Staleybridge, Staley Bridge, Stalybridge and Staly Bridge" in published timetables, with Bradshaw's Guide finally settling on the Stalybridge version in 1890. (Note: For example. Bradshaw's 1855 timetable uses two spelling in the same table.)

In some publications, such as Ordnance Survey maps, it was called Stalybridge Joint Station to distinguish it from the Lancashire and Yorkshire Railway (L&YR) station.

=== Ownership and routes ===
Stalybridge station was built by the Sheffield, Ashton-under-Lyne and Manchester Railway (SAMR) and opened as the terminus of its Stalybridge branch on 23 December 1845.

There was another Stalybridge station, which was operated initially by the Ashton, Stalybridge and Liverpool Junction Railway (AS&LJR), which later became the L&YR. Sited adjacent to this London and North Western Railway (LNWR) station, it opened in 1846 as the terminus of that company's line from Manchester Victoria.

On 27 July 1846, Parliament authorised the SAMR amalgamation with other railways and with effect from 1 January 1847 it became part of the Manchester, Sheffield and Lincolnshire Railway (MS&LR) which took ownership of the station.

It became a through station on 13 July 1849, when the LNWR opened the line from this station, via an end-on connection, to Huddersfield. At this time, the incoming lines from Manchester to the two adjacent stations were connected and joint passenger facilities, with separate booking offices, were provided; the station became jointly owned and managed by the MS&LR and LNWR. (Note: The AS&LJR, which had by now become the Lancashire and Yorkshire Railway (L&YR) station, was taken out of service to passengers; it was later reopened to provide additional capacity.) Joint goods facilities with separate warehouses were provided at the adjacent L&YR site.

The LNWR had running powers over both the L&YR line from Manchester Victoria and the MS&LR line from Guide Bridge; it remained a joint station until nationalisation. It was owned jointly by the MS&LR and LNWR, used by the L&YR, then the MS&LR, and became part of the Great Central Railway (GCR); the Midland Railway also started to use the station during the GCR's ownership.

The station was used by all three companies; despite being enlarged in 1858 and gaining refreshment rooms in 1859, it remained unsatisfactory. In 1869, the L&YR returned to using their former station. The connection lines between the stations were replaced in 1883 and a new station was built in 1885.

From 1882, the LNWR built their own line to Stalybridge from Denton Junction; (Note: Denton Junction lay to the south of Guide Bridge.) the southerly section to Dukinfield and Ashton station opened on 2 October 1882, with the remaining section into Stalybridge on 1 August 1893 for goods and 7 August 1893 for passengers. This line was closed to passengers on 25 September 1950 and to goods on 1 January 1968.

The LNWR built a further line to relieve congestion on the way to Huddersfield; this line, known as the Micklehurst Loop, ran from Stalybridge on the opposite side of the valley from the original line and rejoined it at Diggle. The line was opened for goods on 1 December 1885 and for passengers on 3 May 1886. The line closed to passengers on 7 September 1964 and to goods traffic in stages by 3 October 1966.

In the 1890s, the station had two main through-platforms, with three bay platforms all facing toward Manchester: two on the north and one to the south of the station. The main platform lines had two further through lines between them and there was another two through lines to the south. A signal box was located above the four central lines in the centre of the station and a subway at the eastern end of the station gave access to the southern platform from the main station buildings on the north side.

A joint goods yard with a shed was located to the south of the passenger station, it was able to accommodate most types of goods including live stock and was equipped with a twenty-ton crane.

== Facilities ==
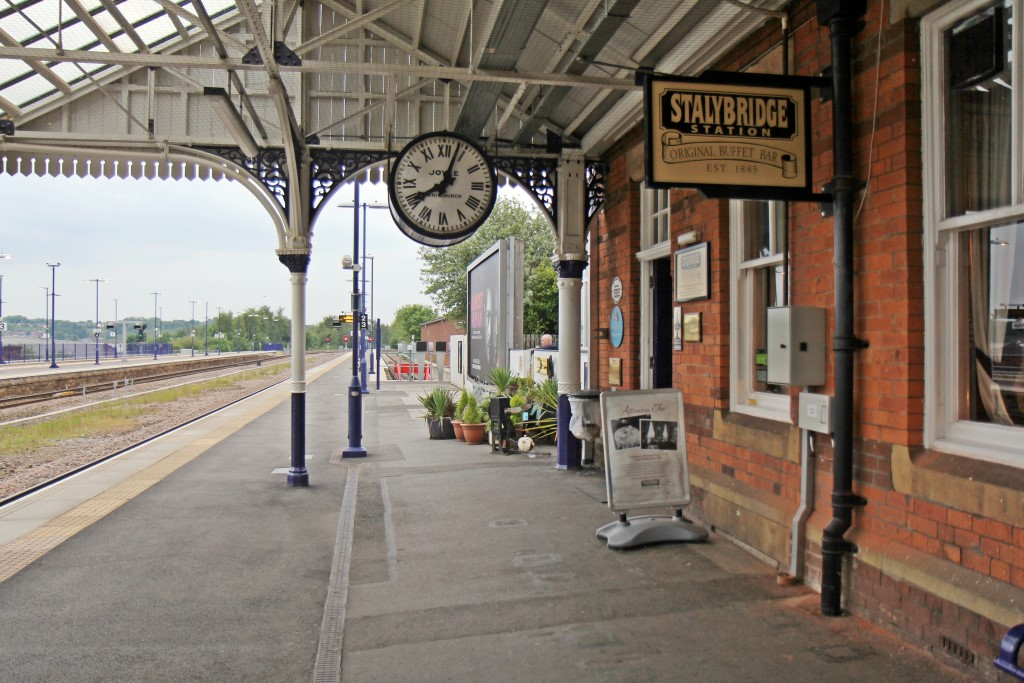
The buffet on platform 4

The station has an entrance block with a ticket office, with ramps and a passenger subway lead that up to the platforms. The station is one of very few to retain its original buffet; the 1998 refurbishment won awards from CAMRA and English Heritage. It was voted "best bar" at the 2008 Tameside Food and Drink Festival.

=== Refurbishment and redevelopment ===
Following further refurbishment in 2012, Lord Pendry of Stalybridge, who often used the buffet bar and contributed over half of the £6,000 costs, unveiled a plaque to mark the works.

In a £1.5m overhaul of the station, which began in 2007, the platforms were raised and the toilets, information services and shelters on the westbound platform were improved. In December 2008, the new entrance was completed.

The station, platforms and railway tracks were reworked in 2022/23, as part of the Transpennine Route Upgrade, to support the electrification process and to enable a speed of 50 mph (80 km/h) to pass through the station. TransPennine Express services began using electric traction through the station on 1 December 2024.

Further work to expand the station was completed in 2012. This saw major alterations to the track layout, including the opening of two new platforms and signalling, with control of the latter passing to the Manchester East signalling centre at Stockport; (Note: The 1886 No. 2 signal box closed at the end of October 2012.) the project cost £20million. This improved operational flexibility and reliability, allowing the line speed through the station and junction to be increased to 50 mph (80 km/h); it made the station ready for the electrification of the Leeds-Manchester trans-Pennine route, which is ongoing and is scheduled to be finished in 2032. Two new platforms were opened on 5 November 2012; the former platform 1 was renumbered 4 and a new bay on the northern side was numbered 5.

An Access for All scheme, funded by the Department for Transport, brought easier access to all of the platforms. Lifts were built to give step-free access to the entire station, although the station had no steps previously as there were ramps to all platforms.

== Layout ==
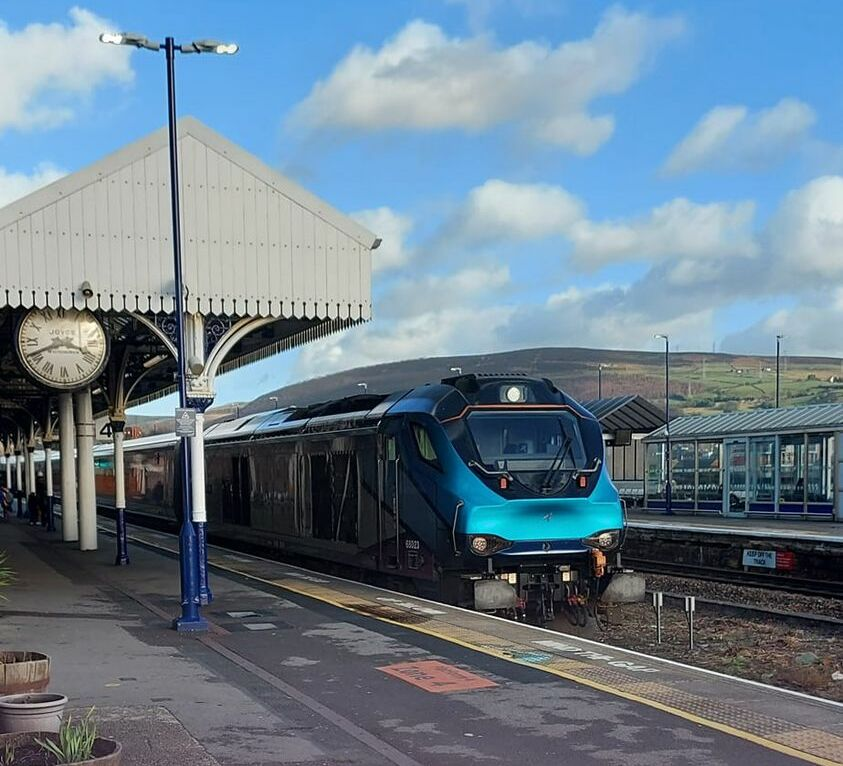
A TransPennine Express Class 68 diesel locomotive at platform 4 (2022)

Stalybridge has five platforms:

1. Westbound through platform, used by TransPennine Express
2. Westbound smaller bay platform, used regularly only by Northern Trains' parliamentary service to Stockport
3. Westbound through platform, used by TransPennine Express
4. Eastbound through platform, used by TransPennine Express
5. Eastbound longer bay, used by the hourly Northern Trains' service to Southport.

== Services ==
The station is served by two train operating companies, which provide the following general off-peak service pattern in trains per hour/week (tph/tpw):

TransPennine Express:

- 1 tph to Liverpool Lime Street, via Manchester Victoria
- 1 tph to Manchester Piccadilly
- 1 tph to Hull Paragon, via Huddersfield and Leeds
- 1 tph to York (stopping service), via Huddersfield and Wakefield Kirkgate.

Northern Trains:

- 1 tph to Southport, via Manchester Victoria, Salford Central and Bolton
- 1 tpw to Stockport, via Guide Bridge.

A parliamentary train still travels along the whole Stockport–Stalybridge line which, for many years, was in one direction only and with no return service. An attempt was made to close the line to passenger services in the early 1990s; the service was cut drastically in May 1989, after the rerouting of trans-Pennine services from Manchester Victoria to Piccadilly. Closure was refused by the Department for Transport, which ordered that a regular service must continue.

This service is the only one to call at Denton and Reddish South. It ran on a Saturday, as the 09:22 Stockport to Stalybridge, until 2007; it was subsequently changed to a Friday service in the opposite direction. From the start of the summer 2018 timetable, the service shifted back to Saturday and now operates in both directions. Trains currently leave Stalybridge at 08:30, call at Guide Bridge, Denton and Reddish South, and arrive at Stockport at 08:59; it returns to Stalybridge at 09:29.

Preceding station	National Rail	Following station
Manchester Piccadilly	TransPennine Express; TransPennine North Route	Huddersfield
Manchester Victoria	TransPennine Express; TransPennine North Route	Mossley
Ashton-under-Lyne	Northern Trains Huddersfield Line	Terminus
Guide Bridge	Northern Trains Stockport–Stalybridge line (Parliamentary service)	Terminus
Disused railways
Terminus	London and North Western Railway Micklehurst Line	Staley and Millbrook Line and station closed
Dukinfield and Ashton Line and station closed	London and North Western Railway Stalybridge Junction Railway	Terminus

== In popular culture ==
Michael Portillo visited the buffet bar in "Manchester Piccadilly to Silkstone Common", a 2017 episode of Great British Railway Journeys.
