= List of closed railway stations in Greater Manchester =

Railways around Manchester in 1921
London & North Western (LNWR)
Lancashire & Yorkshire (LYR)
Cheshire Lines (GCR / MR / GNR)
Midland (MR)
Great Central (GCR)
Joint GCR / LNWR
Joint GCR / MR
Joint LYR / LNWR
Joint GWR / LNWR
Lancashire
Other counties

== Bolton ==
- Bolton Great Moor Street
- Chequerbent (1831 station)
- Chequerbent (1885 station)
- Chew Moor
- Darcy Lever
- Horwich
- Lostock Lane
- The Oaks
- Plodder Lane
- Rumworth and Daubhill

== Bury ==
- Ainsworth Road Halt
- Bradley Fold
- Brandlesholme Road Halt
- Bury Bolton Street (now preserved, as part of the East Lancashire Railway)
- Bury Knowsley Street
- Greenmount
- Holcombe Brook
- Knowles Level Crossing Halt
- Molyneux Brow
- Radcliffe Black Lane
- Radcliffe Bridge
- Ringley Road
- Sunny Wood Halt
- Tottington
- Withins Lane
- Woodhill Road Halt
- Woolfold

== Manchester ==
- Baguley
- Chorlton-cum-Hardy (converted to Metrolink)
- Clayton Bridge
- Dean Lane (converted to Metrolink)
- Didsbury
- Fallowfield
- High Street (Metrolink tram stop)
- Hyde Road
- Levenshulme South
- Longsight
- Manchester Central
- Manchester Liverpool Road
- Manchester Mayfield
- Manchester Oldham Road
- Miles Platting
- Mosley Street (Metrolink tram stop)
- Newton Heath
- Northenden
- Park
- Wilbraham Road
- Withington and West Didsbury
- Woodlands Road (Metrolink tram stop)

== Oldham ==
- Delph
- Derker (converted to Metrolink)
- Diggle
- Dobcross
- Failsworth (converted to Metrolink)
- Friezland
- Grasscroft
- Grotton and Springhead
- Hollinwood (converted to Metrolink)
- Lees
- Measurements
- Middleton Junction
- Moorgate
- Oldham Central
- Oldham Clegg Street
- Oldham Glodwick Road
- Oldham Mumps (converted to Metrolink)
- Oldham Mumps (LNWR)
- Oldham Werneth
- Royton
- Royton Junction
- Saddleworth
- Shaw and Crompton (converted to Metrolink)
- Uppermill

== Rochdale ==
- Broadfield
- Broadley
- Middleton
- Milnrow (converted to Metrolink)
- New Hey (converted to Metrolink as "Newhey")
- Shawclough and Healey
- Wardleworth

== Salford ==
- Agecroft Bridge
- Barton Moss
- Cadishead
- Cross Lane
- Dixon Fold
- Ellenbrook
- Irlams o' th' Height
- Little Hulton
- Manchester Exchange
- Monton Green
- Oldfield Road
- Ordsall Lane
- Pendlebury
- Pendleton
- Pendleton Bridge
- Seedley
- Walkden Low Level
- Weaste
- Worsley

== Stockport ==
- Cheadle (Cheshire Lines)
- Cheadle (LNWR)
- Cheadle Heath
- Hazel Grove (Midland)
- Heaton Mersey
- Heaton Norris
- High Lane
- Middlewood Higher
- Stockport Portwood
- Stockport Tiviot Dale

== Tameside ==
- Ashton Moss
- Ashton Oldham Road
- Ashton Park Parade
- Audenshaw (1st)
- Audenshaw (2nd)
- Droylsden
- Dukinfield & Ashton
- Dukinfield Central
- Godley East
- Hooley Hill
- Micklehurst
- Park Bridge
- Staley and Millbrook

== Trafford ==
- Altrincham (1st)
- Bowdon
- Broadheath
- Cornbrook (converted to Metrolink)
- Dunham (W&SR)
- Dunham Massey
- Partington
- West Timperley

== Wigan ==
- Astley
- Atherleigh
- Atherton Bag Lane
- Bickershaw and Abram
- Boar's Head
- Hindley Green
- Hindley South
- Howe Bridge
- Leigh
- Lower Ince
- Pennington
- Plank Lane
- Platt Bridge
- Tyldesley
- West Leigh
- West Leigh & Bedford
- Wigan Central

== See also ==
- List of railway stations in Greater Manchester
