= Kirklees Valley Local Nature Reserve =

Nature Reserve in Greater Manchester, England

Coordinates: 53°36′53″N 2°19′48″W

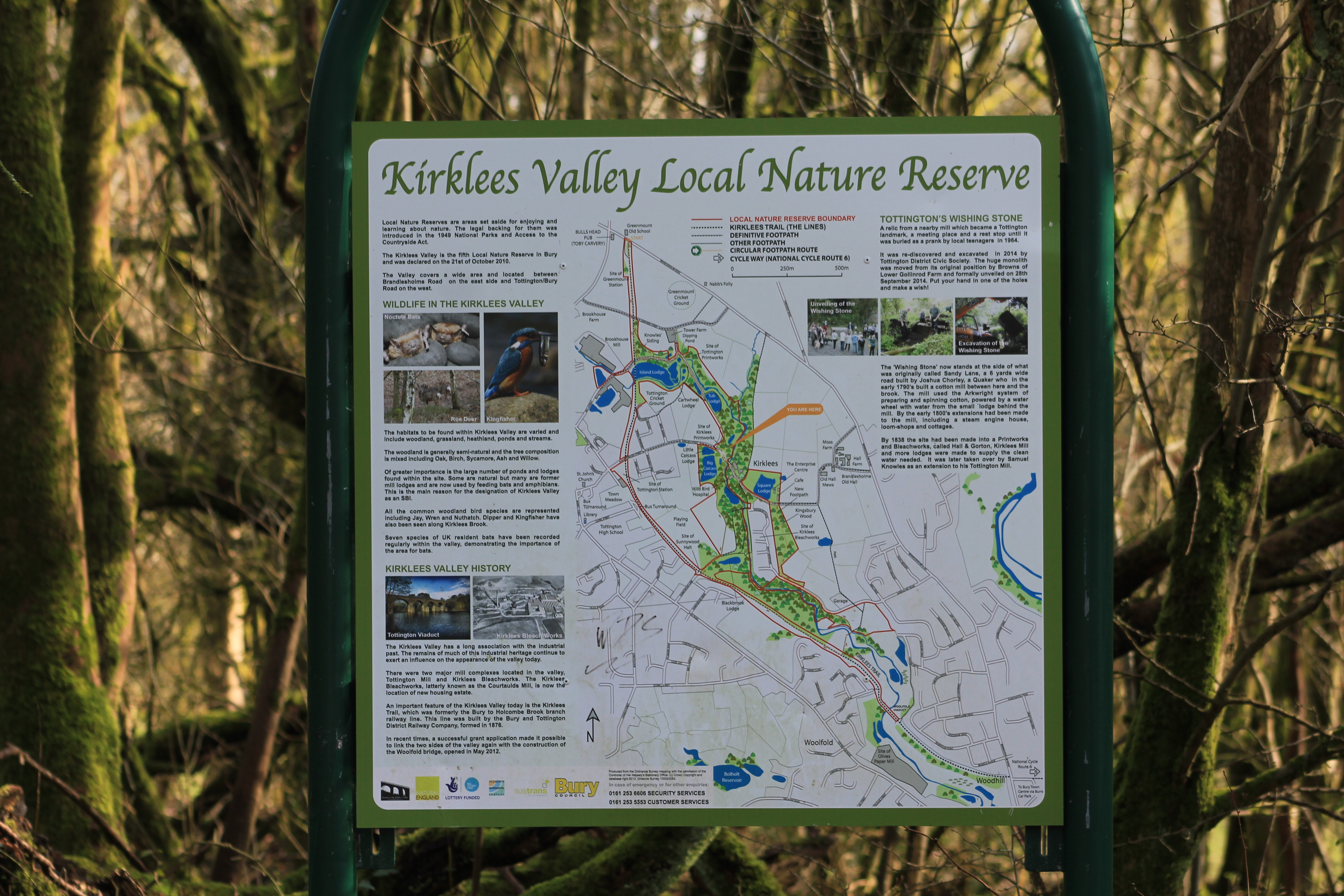
Official map, which is signposted throughout the reserve

Kirklees Valley Local Nature Reserve is a nature reserve in the Metropolitan Borough of Bury, that stretches from Greenmount in the north, Bury in the south, and Tottington in the west. It was declared a nature reserve in October 2010 under the 1949 National Parks and Access to the Countryside Act.

The nature reserve contains numerous footpaths, lodges and landmarks, as well as farmland and historic mill sites.

== Industrial History ==
The reserve sits on what was once a prosperous industrial area in Tottington, including Tottington and Kirklees Printworks, Tottington Bleachworks and Olive’s Paper Mill. The first evidence of a mill in this area was Tottington Corn Mill which was first mentioned in 1296.

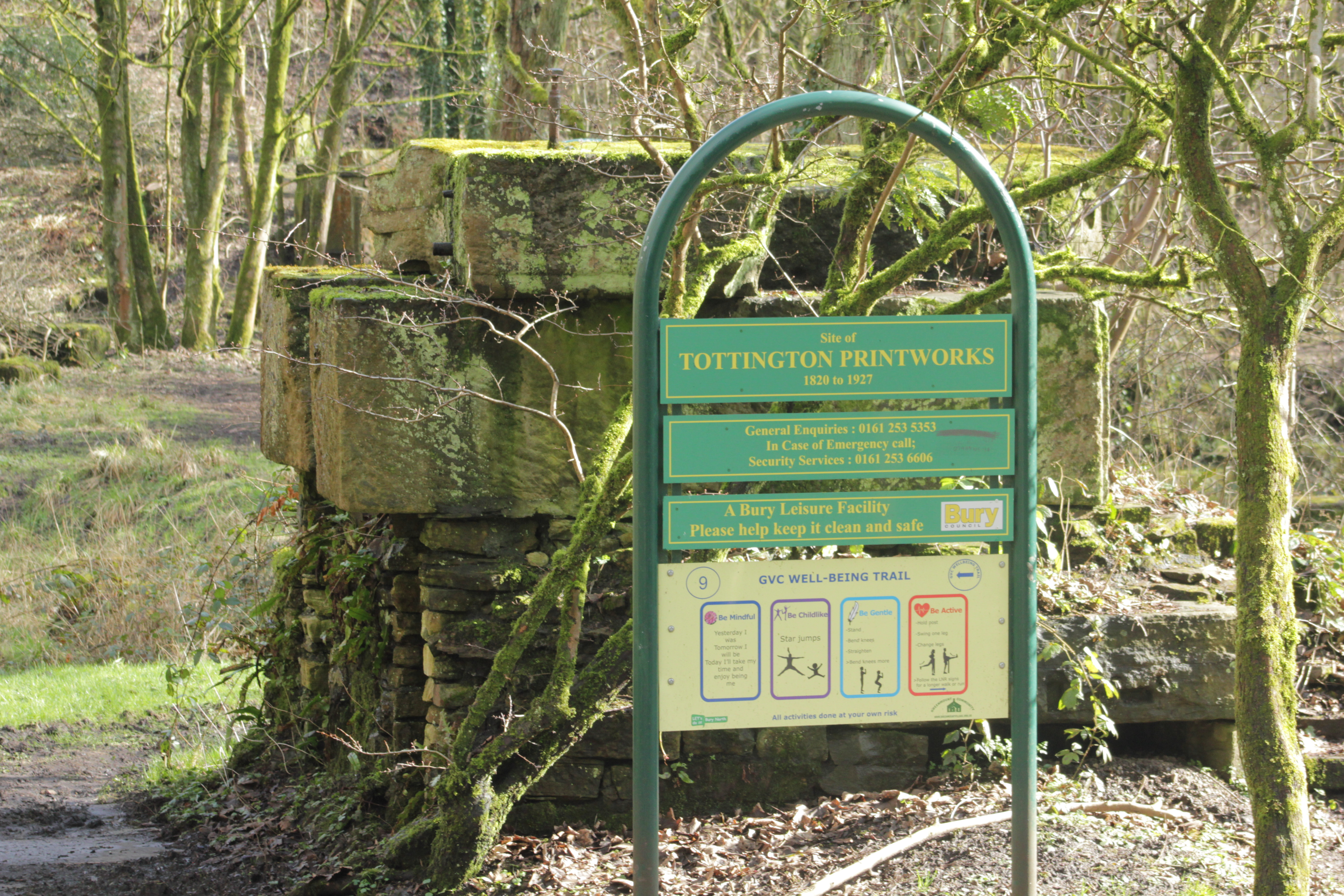
The ruins of Tottington Printworks

In 1820, Tottington Cotton Mill was converted into a Calico Printworks, which survived until 1927. The site was demolished completely with the closure of the engraving shop in the 1940s. The site and surrounding area became derelict and overgrown, forming the basis of the nature reserve.

In 2011, an Archaeological Dig was conducted by Oxford Archaeology and Bury Ranger Service, surveying the area and uncovering sites such as the Dye House.

== Ecology ==
While Kirklees Valley LNR has not been declared a Site of Special Scientific Interest, it still contains notable Ecological aspects, as with many abandoned areas of human settlement.

The nature reserve is shaped by Kirklees Brook, a minor river which feeds into the River Irwell. According to the Environment Agency (a body supported by the UK Department for Environment, Food & Rural Affairs), the river contains good quantities of invertebrates, but poor quantities of fish, along with high concentrations of dissolved ammonia and oxygen. Like all rivers in the UK, Kirklees Brook has a chemical status of Fail, mostly due to Mercury and Polybrominated diphenyl ethers. The Brook and surrounding areas have been classified as a Site of Biological Importance.

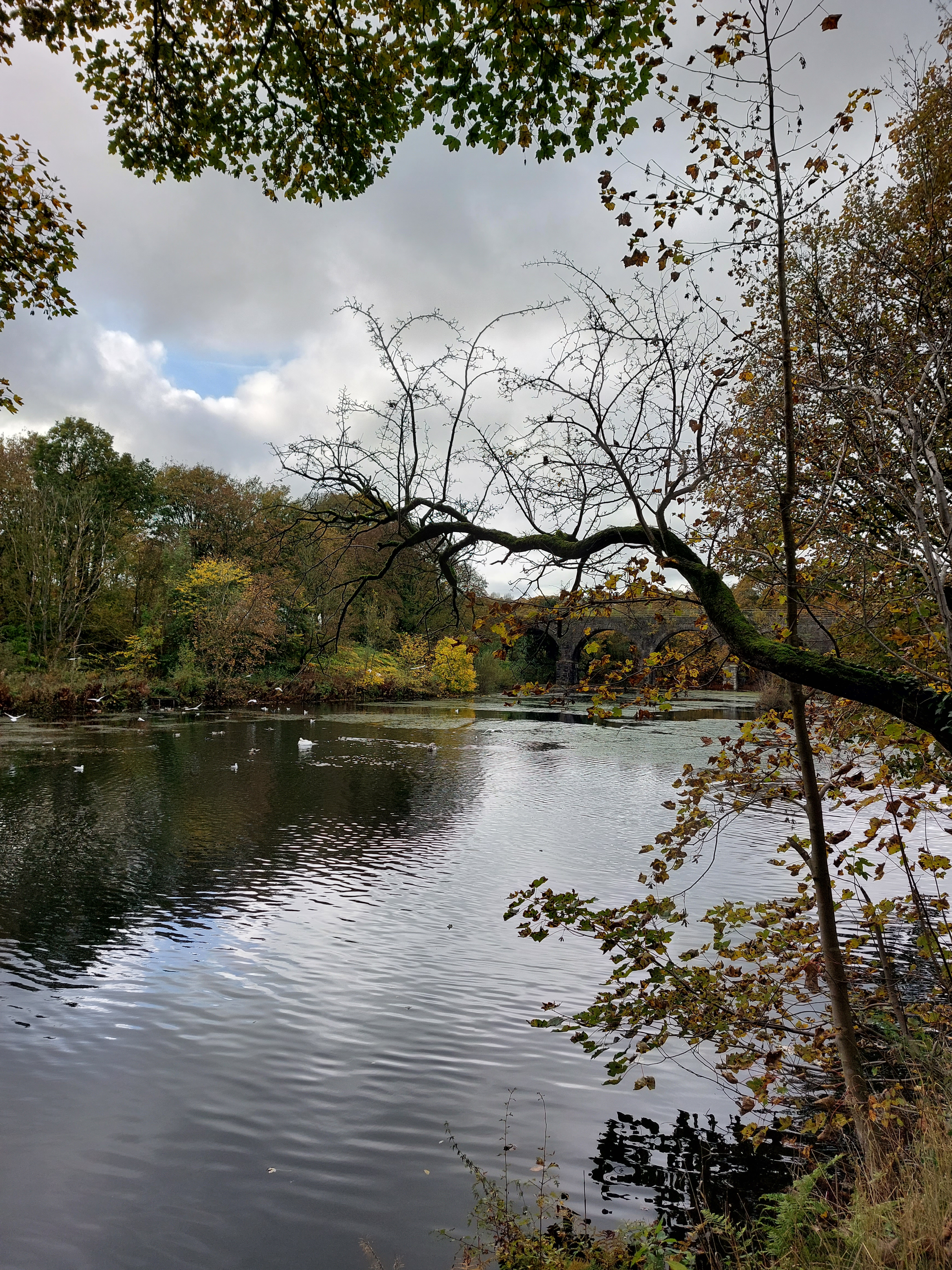
View of Island Lodge from Cartwheel Lodge

Most other bodies of water are Lodges, which were at one point reservoirs serving the many industrial sites and mills and are or were popular sites for angling and duck feeding. There are 9 surveyed lodges, the largest of which being Island Lodge, also known as Scholes’ Reservoir, named after the small island in the middle of the lodge. It is situated under Tottington Viaduct and south of what was once Mill Street, which was the primary route to Tottington Printworks from the south and can still be seen today. It was likely a part of Tottington Corn Mill.

In 2018, a campaign was started to revive Island Lodge after effluent was found to be leaking into the lodge from poorly connected drain pipes, causing the death of fish and an increase in algal growth. So far, no action has been reported.

In a study conducted by the South Lancashire Bat Group, six species of bats were surveyed between 1994 and 2006, including the Common Pipistrelle and the Daubenton’s Bat. The average number of bat species found in one lodge was two. EBird records 62 observed bird species within the reserve, including Redwings, Canada Geese, and Mute swans

The Enterprise Center is a learning centre situated east of Square Lodge, a popular fishing site. The centre focuses on Conservation and Ecology and is aimed at young people with Special Educational Needs (SEN) and adults not in Employment, Education or Training (NEET).

== Walking Trails ==
=== Kirklees Trail ===
Kirklees Trail, known locally as The Lines, is the longest and most well established walk in the reserve that stretches the length of the reserve, starting and ending on Brandleshome Road. It occupies the former railway lines used by the Bury to Holcombe Brook Line before its closure in 1963. The trail was created under a proposal from the Tottington District Civic Society to transform the unused railway into a footpath in 1972. The trail also connects to the National Cycle Route 6.

=== Circular Walk ===
The Circular Walk is a footpath that starts at Brandleshome Road in Greenmount. It encompasses the sites of Tottington and Kirklees Printworks; the Enterprise Centre and Kirklees Country Café; and Holcombe Hunt. The trail is indicated by Green Arrows on signposts, gateposts, and benches.

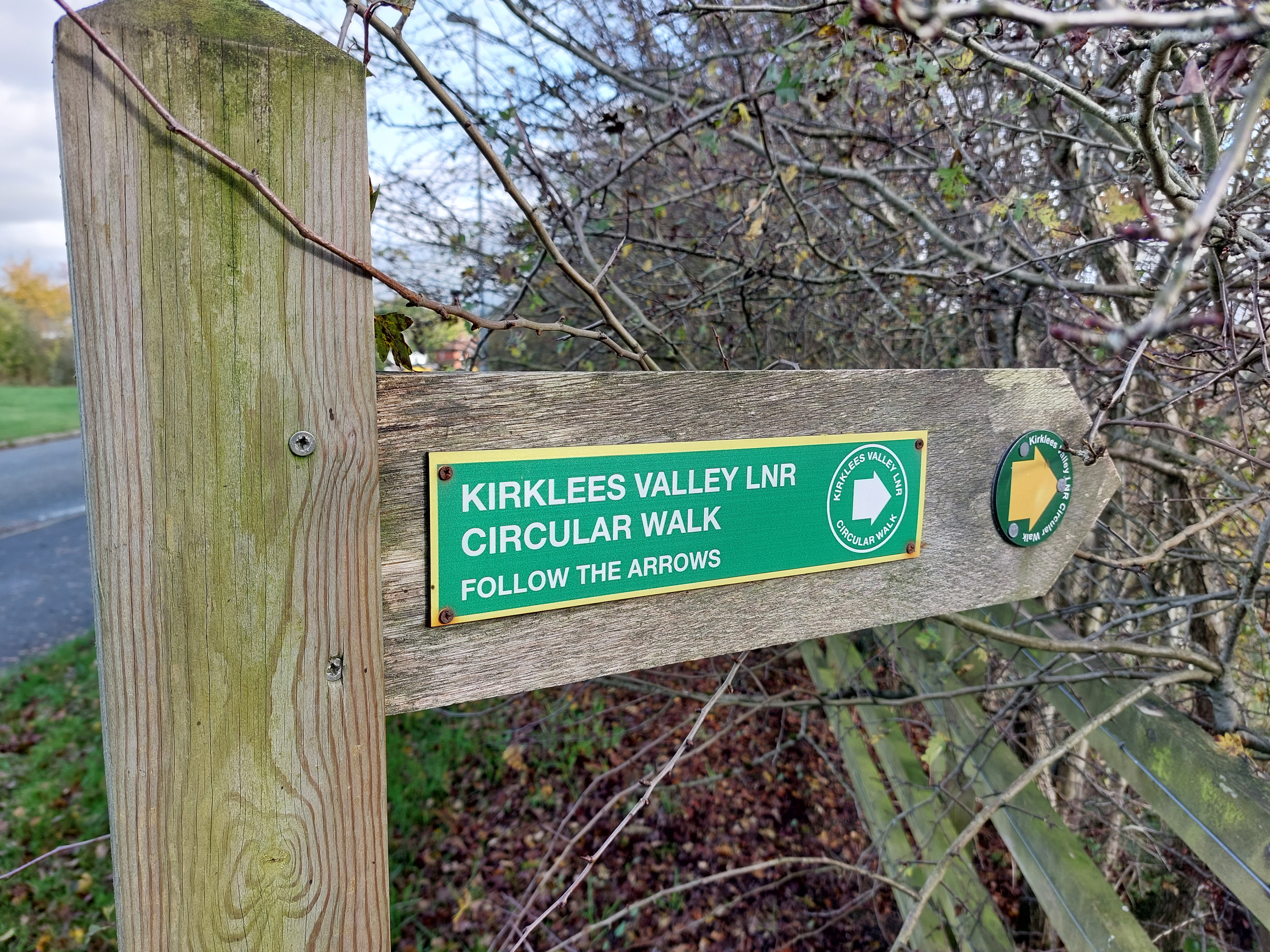
Signpost indicating the Circular Walk

=== Time Trial ===
In August 2020, 3 routes were chosen to be a part of the Sunnywood Project’s ‘Time Trials’. By scanning a QR code at the start and end of the chosen route, players can record their time and compare it with other players. These routes were designed to encourage families to walk more and explore the nature reserve. The trail is indicated by green, yellow and red arrows on signposts, gateposts, and benches.

=== History Trail ===
In February 2021, a new route was chosen by the Sunnywood Project as the History Trail. It encompasses 15 landmarks in and near the reserve, such as Tower Farm. It is a self-led trail with QR codes at each location. Each QR code leads to a video narrated by Yan Tan Tethera’s Professor Jigget.

=== GVC Wellbeing Trail ===
In June 2022, to celebrate the Platinum Jubilee of Elizabeth II, a new trail was established by the Greenmount Village Community. The trail is indicated by 10 signposts, each of which contains activities categorised under ‘Be Mindful’, ‘Be Childlike’, ‘Be Gentle’, and ‘Be Active’.

== Points of interest ==
=== Birdhouses ===
Along Kirklees Trail, numerous birdhouses can be found with unconventional designs, such as a roll of toilet paper and a domino, which have been designed by Paul Rodney. In January 2021, a birdhouse in the shape of a signpost was installed across from the site of Tottington Railway Station with the words ‘Barnard Castle’ in the style of a Snellen chart. Rodney created it with the intention to mock Dominic Cummings after he broke Lockdown rules by visiting Barnard Castle, claiming that he was testing his eyesight.

=== Emergency Meadow ===
Emergency Meadow is a sculpture of a Victorian handcart that forms part of the Irwell Sculpture Trail. It was designed by Melissa Hunt and constructed in 2015 under the bridge that replaced Woolfold Viaduct. It is only sewn with white flowers as a tribute to Olives Paper Mill, which was situated nearby. Today, its upkeep has been minimal, resulting in the bed becoming overgrown.

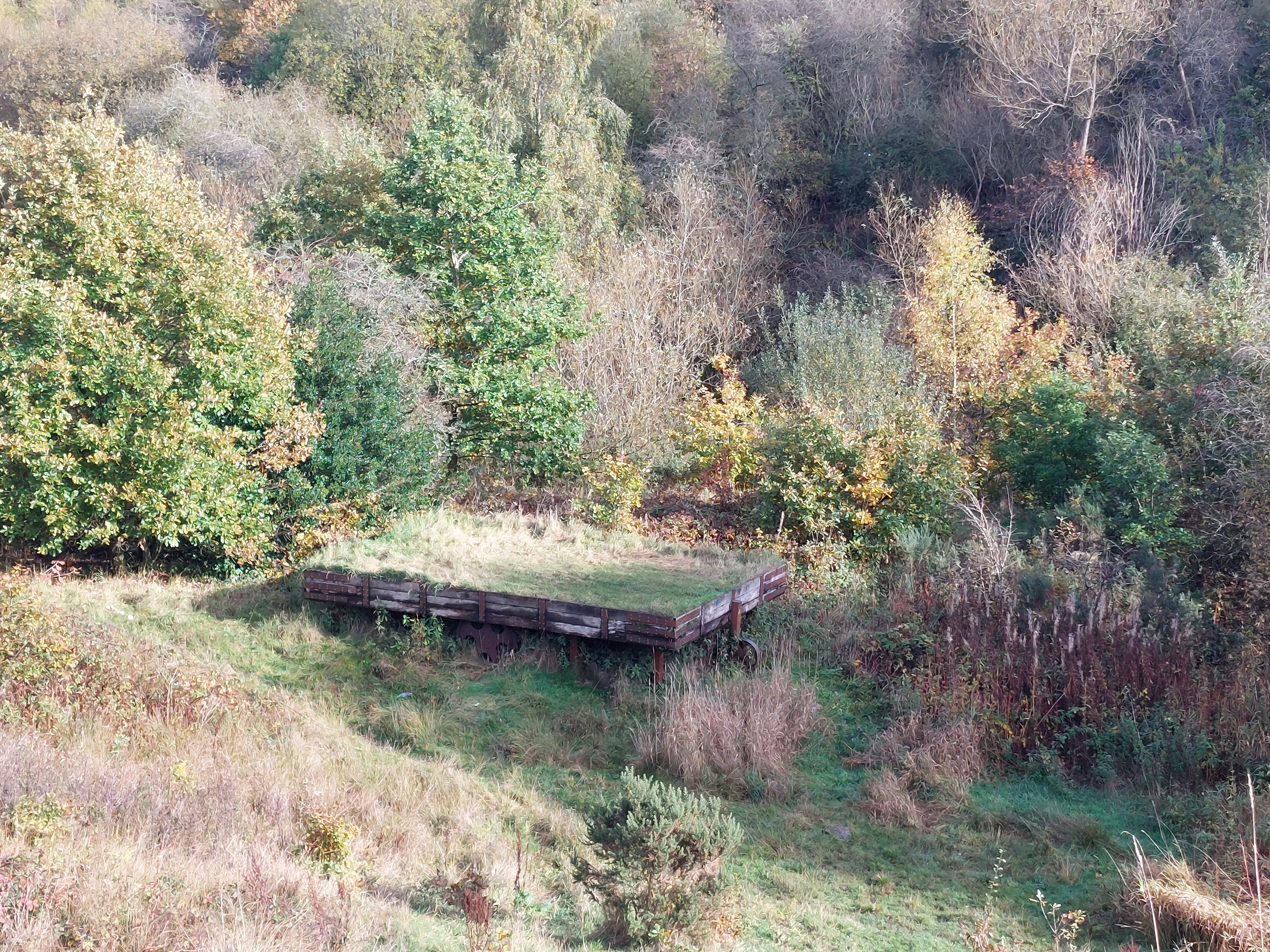
Emergency Meadow

=== Holcombe Hunt ===
The Holcombe Hunt is a heritage hunting society that can be traced back to 1086. It is home to hounds which the society claims are descended from Blue Gascoignes introduced by Norman Settlers. Throughout its time it has seen patrons including Edward I, James I, and George V.

=== Kirklees Valley Wildlife Rescue ===
The Greenmount Wild Bird Hospital was founded in 1970 and registered in 1979 as a sanctuary for injured birds awaiting release back into the wild. In 2019, the hospital’s manager, Natalie Kerr, was banned from keeping birds and the hospital was forced to temporarily close after an RSPCA inspection found 211 birds in unsanitary conditions, 145 of which were put down due to the extent of their injuries. In September 2022, it was rebranded as the Kirklees Valley Wildlife Rescue and refurbished by Volunteers.

=== Little Leopard Coffee ===
The Little Leopard Coffee is a mobile café made from a repurposed vintage caravan. It currently resides on the bus turnaround on Laurel Street, after it was forced to move from its original location due to it being on private land. It also caters to other events outside of Tottington.

=== Tottington Railway Station ===
In July 2021, a façade of a railway station was constructed on the Kirklees Trail at the site of Tottington Railway Station as part of the Tottington Scarecrow Competition. While it originally showed 3 scarecrows depicting characters from the Wizard of Oz, it has remained erect and has been redecorated for special events since, including for the Platinum Jubilee of Elizabeth II.

=== Tottington Wishing Stone ===
The Wishing Stone is a large monolith that was used as a meeting point by locals. The stone’s name comes from the belief that a wish would be granted by placing a hand in one of the holes on top of the stone. In 2014, it was excavated by Tottington District Civic Society after being buried by teenagers in 1964. It was relocated by Lower Gollinrod Farm to what was once Sandy Lane and unveiled on the 28th of September that year.

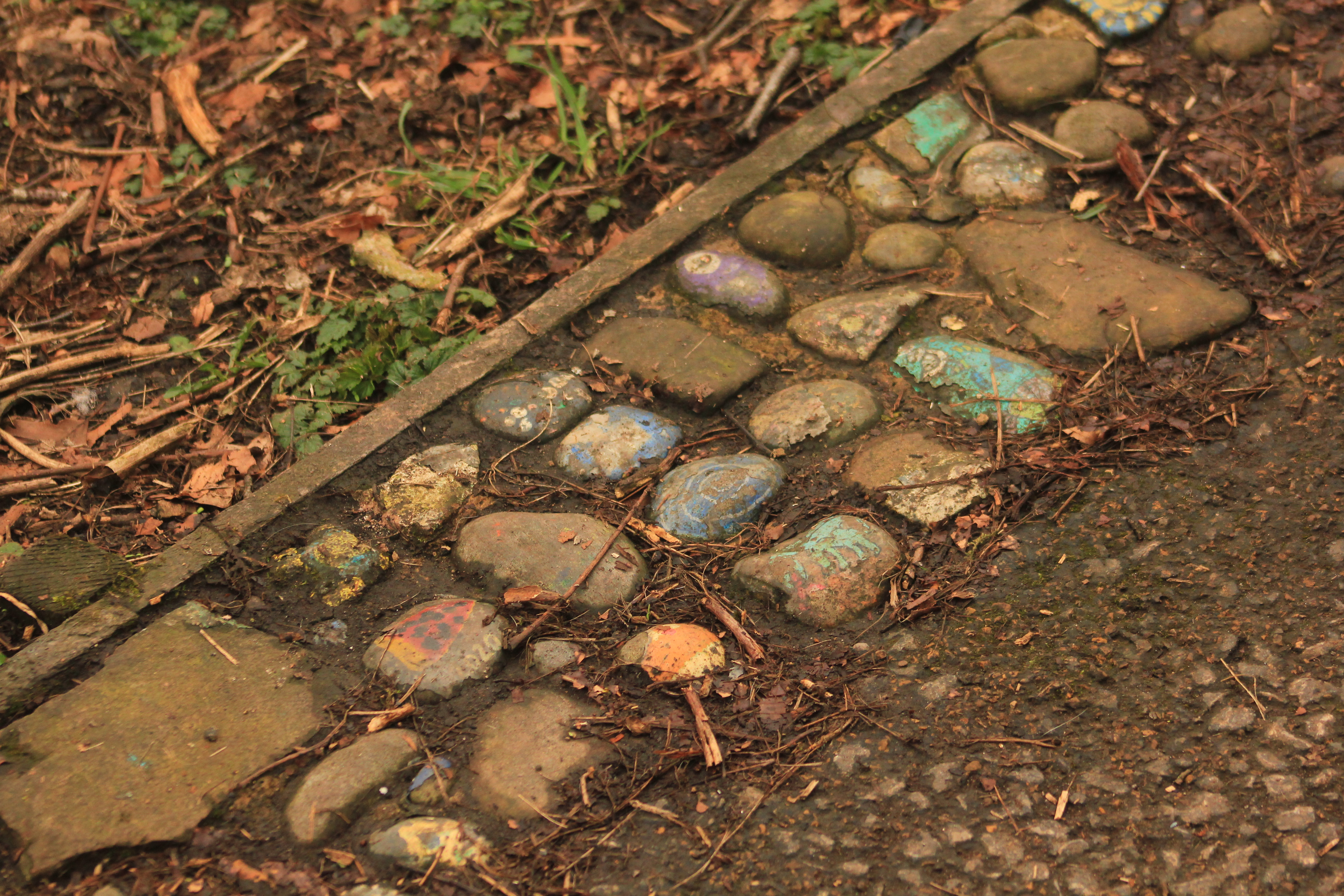
Small section of the Totty Snake

=== Totty Snake ===
In May 2020, the Totty Snake community project was started along Kirklees Trail. It is made of a chain of pebbles painted by local children and adults which have been cemented into the side of the path, many of which were tributes to the work of the NHS during the COVID-19 pandemic.

=== TWIGS ===
TWIGS is the name of the Incredible Edible plot in Tottington. It was set up in 2012 as a part of the Incredible Edible Project to teach children how to grow crops. It is situated on the site of Tottington Railway Station.
