= Knowles Level Crossing Halt railway station =

Former railway station in England

Knowles Level Crossing Halt

General information
- Location: Greenmount, Bury; England
- Coordinates: 53.62048°N 2.33734°W
- Grid reference: SD778138

Other information
- Status: Disused

History
- Original company: Lancashire and Yorkshire Railway
- Pre-grouping: Lancashire and Yorkshire Railway

Key dates
- 3 July 1905: Station opened
- 1 April 1918: Station closed
Location

Knowles Level Crossing Halt was a stopping point on the Bury to Holcombe Brook railway line, from 1905 until 1918.

== History ==
The line from Bury to Holcombe Brook had opened on 6 November 1882, and originally had three intermediate stations. A service of steam railmotors was introduced on the line in July 1905, and four more intermediate stations were opened at the same time; these small stations, or halts, included one at Knowles Level Crossing, 3 miles (4.8 km) from Bury, which opened on 3 July 1905. It closed on 1 April 1918. The halt was on the south side of Shepherd Street.

Preceding station	Disused railways	Following station
Greenmount	L&YR; Bury to Holcombe Brook Line	Tottington
