= Sunny Wood Halt railway station =

Former railway station in England

Sunny Wood Halt

General information
- Location: Tottington, Bury; England
- Coordinates: 53.61042°N 2.33351°W
- Grid reference: SD780127

Other information
- Status: Disused

History
- Original company: Lancashire and Yorkshire Railway
- Pre-grouping: Lancashire and Yorkshire Railway
- Post-grouping: London, Midland and Scottish Railway

Key dates
- 3 July 1905: Station opened
- 5 May 1952: Station closed
Location

Sunny Wood Halt was a stopping point on the Bury to Holcombe Brook railway line from 1905 until the line closed in 1952.

== History ==
The line from Bury to Holcombe Brook had opened on 6 November 1882, and originally there were three intermediate stations. A service of steam railmotors was introduced on the line in July 1905, and four more intermediate stations were opened at the same time; these small stations, or halts, included one at Sunny Wood, 2 miles (3.2 km) from Bury, which opened on 3 July 1905. It closed with the end of passenger services on the line on 5 May 1952.

Preceding station	Disused railways	Following station
Tottington	L&YR; Bury to Holcombe Brook Line	Woolfold
