= Victoria Mill (disambiguation) =

Victoria Mill is a former cotton spinning mill in Miles Platting, Manchester, England.

Victoria Mill or Victoria Mills may also refer to:

== Mills in England ==
- Scarborough Windmill, also known as "Victoria Mill", in North Yorkshire
- Victoria Mill, Skipton, North Yorkshire
- Victoria Mill, Saddleworth, Greater Manchester, now the Saddleworth Museum
- Victoria Mills, Ashford, Kent, former home of H.S. Pledge & Sons Ltd
- Victoria Mills, Bakewell, on the River Wye, Derbyshire
- Several mills in Lancashire including separately listed mills in Preston
- Several mills in Bolton, Greater Manchester
- New Victoria Mills in Bury, Greater Manchester
- Several mills in Manchester, Greater Manchester
- Several mills in Rochdale, Greater Manchester
- Several mills in Salford, Greater Manchester
- Several mills in Stockport, Greater Manchester
- Several mills in Tameside, Greater Manchester
- Several mills in Wigan, Greater Manchester
- Victoria Mills and Victoria Flax Mills, listed buildings in Leeds, West Yorkshire
- Victoria Mill, Listed building in Erewash, Derbyshire
- Victoria Mill, Listed building in Waverton, Cheshire
- Victoria Mill, Listed building in Macclesfield, Cheshire

== Mills outside England ==
- Victoria Mills, India, founded in 1874 as start of Tata Textiles
