= Greenmount railway station =

Former railway station in England

Greenmount
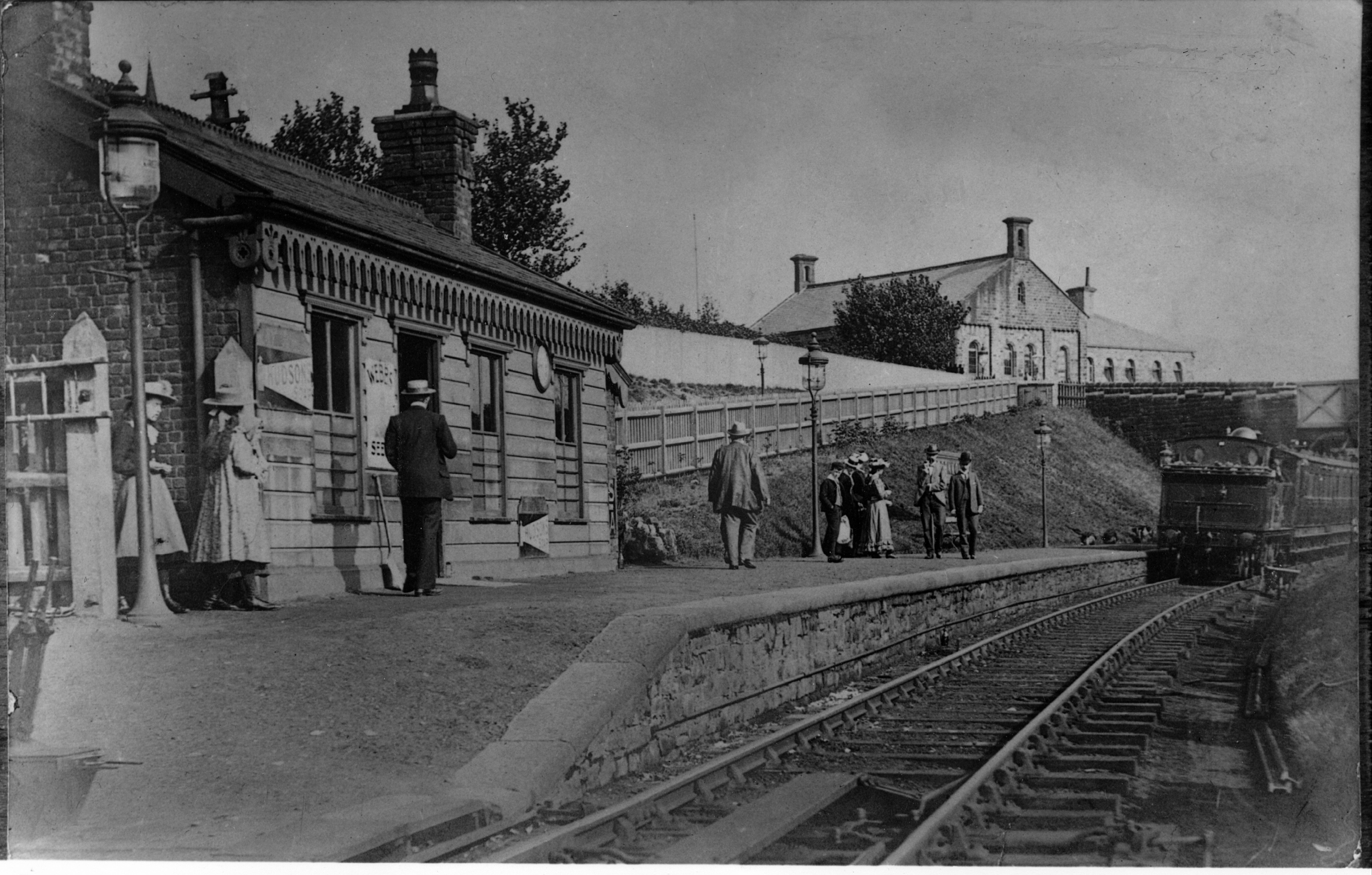

General information
- Location: Greenmount, Bury; England
- Coordinates: 53.62336°N 2.33736°W
- Grid reference: SD778141
- Platforms: 1

Other information
- Status: Disused

History
- Original company: Bury and Tottington District Railway
- Pre-grouping: Lancashire and Yorkshire Railway
- Post-grouping: London, Midland and Scottish Railway

Key dates
- 5 May 1882: Station opened
- 6 November 1952: Station closed
Location

Greenmount Railway Station served the village of Greenmount in the Metropolitan Borough of Bury.

== History ==
The Bury and Tottington District Railway opened from a junction to the north of Bury to a terminus at Holcombe Brook on 6 November 1882. Among the original stations was that at Greenmount, situated 3 1/4 miles (5.2 km) from Bury.

The station closed when passenger services were withdrawn from the Holcombe Brook line on 5 May 1952.

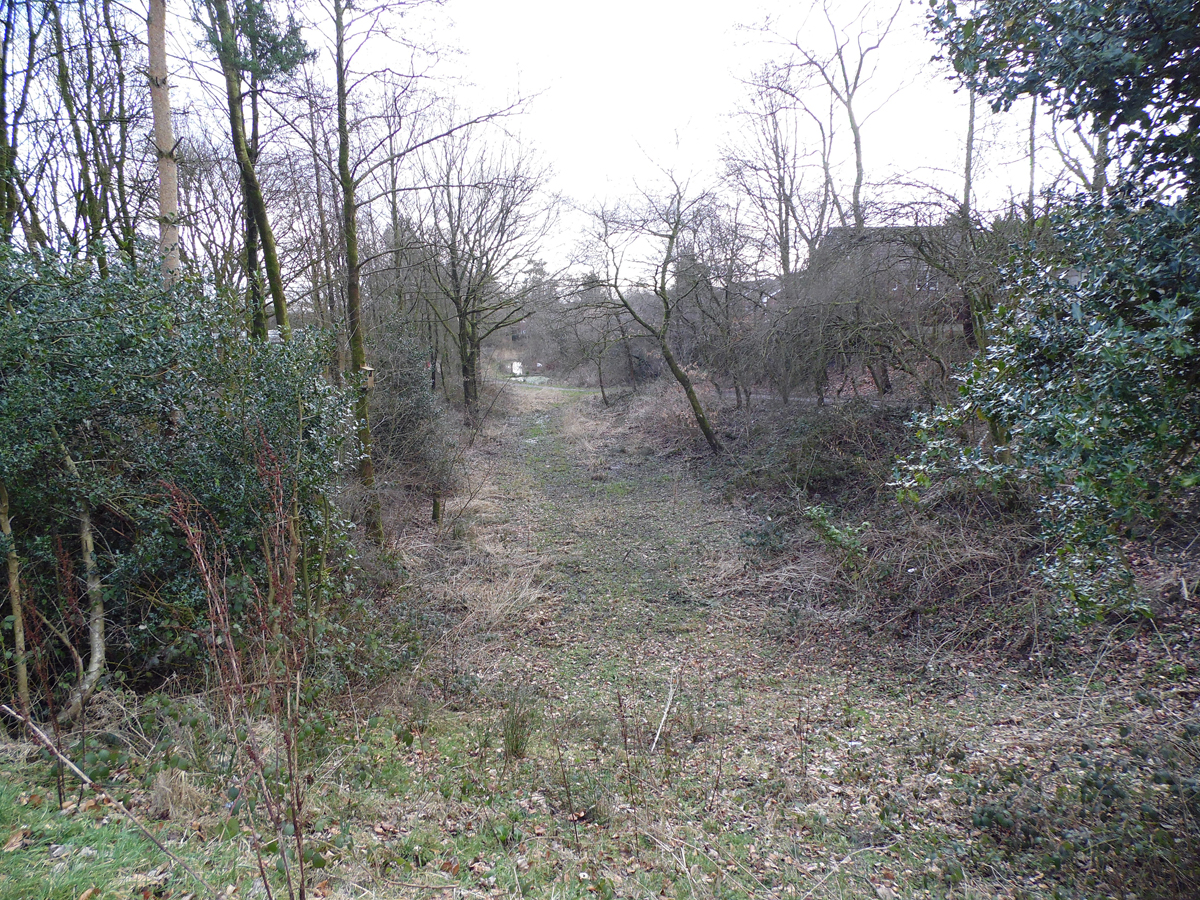
Greenmount Railway Station March 2018

Preceding station	Disused railways	Following station
Holcombe Brook	L&YR; Bury to Holcombe Brook Line	Knowles Level Crossing Halt
