= List of mills in Bury =

This is a list of the cotton and other textile mills in the Borough of Bury, Greater Manchester, England, which comprises Bury, Ramsbottom, Tottington, Radcliffe, Whitefield and Prestwich.

== Mills A-B ==
Name	Architect	Location	Built	Demolished	Served (Years)
Ainsworth Mercerising Works		SD 753094 53°34′52″N 2°22′30″W			
Ainsworth Mills		SD 756092 53°34′44″N 2°22′12″W			
Ainsworth Vale Works		SD 753093 53°34′48″N 2°22′30″W			
Albert Mill		Whitefield, SD 817060 53°33′00″N 2°16′41″W			
Albert Mill		Whitefield, SD 783072 53°33′40″N 2°19′44″W			
Albert New Mill		Whitefield, SD 811059 53°32′56″N 2°17′13″W			
Albion Mill		Prestwich SD 842039 53°31′55″N 2°14′24″W			
	Notes: Hulme Weaving Co, Albion Mills, Rooden lane; 160 looms				
Albion Mills		Bury, SD 796108 53°35′35″N 2°18′36″W			
Bankside Works		Whitefield, SD 792061 53°33′04″N 2°18′55″W			
Barn Brook Mills		Bury SD 812110 53°35′43″N 2°17′08″W			
	Notes: 1891-Bury Cotton Spinning and Manufacturing Co, Limited, 50,000 spindles, 208/508 weft, 328 ring. twist; 918 looms				
Beech Mill		SD 812102 53°35′17″N 2°17′07″W			
Beehive Works		SD 819076 53°33′53″N 2°16′29″W			
Bentley & Lunn Mills		SD 810138 53°37′13″N 2°17′19″W			
Bevis Green Works		SD 810138 53°37′13″N 2°17′19″W			
Black Lane Mills (Constellation)		Ainsworth Rd, Radcliffe SD 777088 53°34′31″N 2°20′17″W			
	Notes: 1891-Tootal Broadhurst Lee Co, Ltd., 70,000 spindles, 140 looms Now renamed Constellation Mill				
Bleaklow Mill		Hawkshaw SD 765149 53°37′48″N 2°21′24″W			
	Notes: 1891-Rigg Brothers, Bleaklow Mill; 8,000 spindles, 20'/405 twist; 170 looms Converted to an apartment block and renamed Hawkshaw Lodge.				
Bolholt Mills		SD 785117 53°36′05″N 2°19′35″W			
Brickhouse Mills		SD 813110 53°35′43″N 2°17′02″W			
	Notes: 1891- J. and A. Entwistle, Brick House Mill, Wash lane; 4,000 spindles, 51/108; 140 looms				
Bridge Hall Works		SD 824106 53°35′30″N 2°16′02″W			
Bridge Mills		SD 797111 53°35′46″N 2°18′29″W			
Bridge Street Mill		SD 812113 53°35′52″N 2°17′08″W			
Britannia Mill		Woolfold SD 789120 53°36′15″N 2°19′13″W			
	Notes: 1891-John Fletcher, 50 looms; Tweedale and Farrar, 400 looms				
Britannia Mill		Prestwich, SD 812039 53°31′53″N 2°17′06″W			
Britannia Mills		Free Town, Bury, SD 813114 53°35′56″N 2°17′02″W			
Britannia Mills		Radcliffe SD 782074 53°33′46″N 2°19′50″W			
	Notes: 1891-Street and Son, 8,000 spindles, 168/268 twist, 168/368 weft				
Brookhouse Mill		Tottington SD 776137 53°37′10″N 2°20′24″W			
	Notes: 1891-Bury Commercial Co, Limited, Brook House Mill; 467 looms. On Kirklees Brook.				
Brooksbottoms Mill (The Spinnings)		Summerseat SD 794152 53°37′58″N 2°18′46″W			
	1356822Notes: 1891-Joshua Hoyle and Sons Ltd, 61,560 spindles, 1,082 looms. Now an apartment block.				
Burrs Mill		SD 799126 53°36′34″N 2°18′19″W			

== Mills C-D ==
Name	Architect	Location	Built	Demolished	Served (Years)
California Mill		Lord Street, Bury SD 809107 53°35′33″N 2°17′24″W			
	Notes: Wilson and Ingham, 680 looms				
Canal Mill		Radcliffe SD 779074 53°33′46″N 2°20′06″W			
	Notes: 1891-Stand Lane Mill Co, (together with Allen Street), 390 looms				
Chesham Mills		Chesham, Bury SD 813118 53°36′09″N 2°17′02″W			
	Notes: 1891- Bury and Heap Commercial Co, Ltd.,(together with Woodhill Mills, Elton), 57,586 spindles, 168/328 twist, 208/508 weft; 791 looms				
Cobden Mill		SD 792166 53°38′44″N 2°18′58″W			
Commercial Mill		SD 806115 53°35′59″N 2°17′40″W			
Cross Mill		Radcliffe SD 794078 53°33′59″N 2°18′45″W			
	Notes: 1891-Bowker Squire and Son, 252 looms				
Crow Oaks Works		SD 795064 53°33′14″N 2°18′39″W			
Crown Mill		SD 762150 53°37′51″N 2°21′41″W			
Crystal Mill		SD 784068 53°33′26″N 2°19′39″W			
Derby Street Mill		SD 809109 53°35′40″N 2°17′24″W			
Dingle Vale Works		SD 778069 53°33′30″N 2°20′11″W			
Dumers Lane Mill		SD 803083 53°34′15″N 2°17′56″W			

== Mills E-F ==
Name	Architect	Location	Built	Demolished	Served (Years)
Egyptian Mills		Elton, Bury SD 794102 53°35′17″N 2°18′45″W			
	Notes: 1891-Milnes Brothers and Hoyle,10,000 spindles, 561/628 twist; 334 looms				
Elton Cop Works		SD 791114 53°35′55″N 2°19′02″W			
Elton Fold Mills		SD 792113 53°35′52″N 2°18′56″W			
Elton Vale Works		SD 787110 53°35′42″N 2°19′23″W			
Fern Grove Mills		SD 822115 53°35′59″N 2°16′13″W			
Fernhill Mill		Fernhill, Bury, SD 806115 53°35′59″N 2°17′40″W			
Fernhill Mills		Hornby St, Fernhill, Bury, SD 807117 53°36′05″N 2°17′35″W			
Fernhill Mills		Hornby St, Fernhill, Bury, SD 807116 53°36′02″N 2°17′35″W			
Field Mill		SD 794171 53°39′00″N 2°18′47″W			
Fold Mill		SD 757084 53°34′18″N 2°22′06″W			
Foundry Mill		Radcliffe SD 781068 53°33′26″N 2°19′55″W			
	Notes: 1891-John Bleakley, 60 looms				
Fountain Street North Mill		SD 713110 53°35′41″N 2°26′06″W			

== Mills G-H-I-J ==
Name	Architect	Location	Built	Demolished	Served (Years)
Glen Mill		Tottington SD 783122 53°36′21″N 2°19′46″W			
	Notes: 1891-Bury and Elton Commercial Co, Ltd (together with Soho Mill, Elton), 50,000 spindles, 161/36, ring twist, 201/468 weft; 500 looms				
Gollinrod Mill		Summerseat, SD 800155 53°38′08″N 2°18′14″W			
Heap Bridge Mills		SD 824106 53°35′30″N 2°16′02″W			
Higher Mills		Free Town, Bury SD 812113 53°35′52″N 2°17′08″W			
	Notes: 1891-John Pilling and Co, 7,000 spindles; 108/208 throstle twist				
Hollins Vale Works (Bleachworks)		Unsworth SD 815085 53°34′22″N 2°16′51″W			
Hollins Vale Works (Dyeworks)		Unsworth SD 814085 53°34′22″N 2°16′56″W			
Holly Bank Mills		Radcliffe SD 778073 53°33′43″N 2°20′12″W			
	Notes: 1891-W. Allen and Sons, 700 looms				
Holme Mill		Ramsbottom SD 792163 53°38′34″N 2°18′58″W			
	Notes:				
Hope Mill		Edenfield, SD 801187 53°39′52″N 2°18′09″W			
Hope Mill		Radcliffe SD 778074 53°33′46″N 2°20′12″W			
	Notes: 1891-John C. Hamer, 350 looms,				
Hope Works		Holcombe, SD 778162 53°38′31″N 2°20′14″W			
Hudcar Mills		Free Town, Bury SD 812117 53°36′05″N 2°17′08″W			
	Notes: 1891-R. and S. Alcock, 14,672 mule and 1,964 ring spindles, 20' twist, 26' weft; 450 looms				
Irwell Bridge Mills		Bury, SD 797111 53°35′46″N 2°18′29″W			
Irwell Bridge Mills		Ramsbottom, SD 794168 53°38′50″N 2°18′47″W			
Irwell Vale Works		Radcliffe, SD 789070 53°33′33″N 2°19′12″W			
Irwell Works		Radcliffe, SD 799085 53°34′22″N 2°18′18″W			

== Mills K-L ==
Name	Architect	Location	Built	Demolished	Served (Years)
Kenyon Street Mill		Ramsbottom, SD 793 172 53°39′03″N 2°18′52″W			
Kenyons Mill		Hawkshaw, SD 762150 53°37′51″N 2°21′41″W			
Kersal Vale Mill		Prestwich, SD 809018 53°30′45″N 2°17′22″W			
Kilnecroft Mill		SD 819076 53°33′53″N 2°16′29″W			
Kirklees works		SD 784128 53°36′41″N 2°19′40″W			
	Notes: On Kirklees Brook.				
Leemans Mill		SD 783122 53°36′21″N 2°19′46″W			
London Vale Works		SD 809018 53°30′45″N 2°17′22″W			
Lower Croft Works		SD 776110 53°35′42″N 2°20′23″W			
Lumn Mills		Walmersley SD 810138 53°37′13″N 2°17′19″W			
	Notes: 1891-E. D. Mimes and Brother				

== Mills M-N-O ==
Name	Architect	Location	Built	Demolished	Served (Years)
Meadow Mill		SD 793167 53°38′47″N 2°18′52″W			
Moorside Mill		Ainsworth, SD 767104 53°35′23″N 2°21′12″W			
Moorside Works		Bury, SD 811111 53°35′46″N 2°17′13″W			
Moss Lane Works		SD 811058 53°32′54″N 2°17′12″W			
Mossfield Mills		Bury SD 819114 53°35′56″N 2°16′30″W			
	Notes: 1891-John and Samuel Hoyle, 3,110 spindles; 110 looms				
Mount Pleasant Mill		Walmersley SD 810151 53°37′55″N 2°17′19″W			
	Notes: 1891-John Hall Limited, 250 looms				
Mount Sion Works		SD 767067 53°33′23″N 2°21′11″W			
New Road Mills		SD 795064 53°33′14″N 2°18′39″W			
New Victoria Mills		Wellington St, Bury SD 796105 53°35′26″N 2°18′34″W			
	Notes: 1891-New Victoria Cotton Spinning and Manufacturing Co, Limited; 30,000 spindles; 520 looms				
Nursery Mills		Chapelfield, Whitefield SD 790061 53°33′04″N 2°19′06″W			
	Notes: 1891-Bancroft and Co, 70 looms				
Old Ground Mill		SD 791167 53°38′47″N 2°19′03″W			
Olive Bank Mill		SD 789120 53°36′15″N 2°19′13″W			

== Mills P-Q-R-S ==
Name	Architect	Location	Built	Demolished	Served (Years)
Paradise Mill		John St, Bury 53°35′45″N 2°17′29″W			
	Notes:				
Pilot Mill		Alfred St, Bury SD 53°35′06″N 2°17′06″W			
	Notes:				
Stanley Mill		Whitefield, Greater Manchester SD			
	Notes: 1891-W. T. Ashton and Son, Stanley Mill, about 300 looms				

== Mills T-U-V ==
Name	Architect	Location	Built	Demolished	Served (Years)
Tottington Mill		SD			

== Mills W-X-Y-Z ==
Name	Architect	Location	Built	Demolished	Served (Years)
Whitefield Mill		Whitefield SD			
	Notes: 1891-Francis Mather, 232 looms				
Whitefield New Mill		Whitefield SD			
	Notes: 1891-W. H. Oldroyd and Co, 274 looms				
Wood Street Mill		James St, Bury 53°35′19″N 2°17′03″W			
	Notes:				

== Bibliography ==
- Ashmore, Owen (1982). The industrial archaeology of North-west England. Manchester University Press. ISBN 0-7190-0820-4.
- Williams, Mike; Farnie, D. A. (1992). Cotton Mills in Greater Manchester. Carnegie Publishing. ISBN 0-948789-89-1.
