= Woodhill Road Halt railway station =

Former railway station in England

Woodhill Road Halt

General information
- Location: Woodhill, Bury; England
- Coordinates: 53.60137°N 2.30612°W
- Grid reference: SD798117

Other information
- Status: Disused

History
- Original company: Lancashire and Yorkshire Railway
- Pre-grouping: Lancashire and Yorkshire Railway
- Post-grouping: London, Midland and Scottish Railway

Key dates
- 3 July 1905: Station opened
- 1 April 1918: Station closed
- 2 April 1934: Station reopened
- 5 May 1952: Station closed
Location

Woodhill Road Halt was a stopping point on the Bury to Holcombe Brook Line from 1905 until 1918 and from 1934 until the line closed in 1952.

== History ==
The line from Bury to Holcombe Brook had opened on 6 November 1882, and originally there were three intermediate stations. A service of steam railmotors was introduced on the line in July 1905, and four more intermediate stations were opened at the same time; these small stations, or halts, included one at Woodhill Road, 3/4 mile (1.2 km) from Bury, which opened on 3 July 1905, but closed on 1 April 1918. It was reopened on 2 April 1934, and closed permanently with the end of passenger services on the line on 5 May 1952.

Preceding station	Disused railways	Following station
Brandlesholme Road Halt	L&YR; Bury to Holcombe Brook Line	Bury Bolton Street
