= Brandlesholme Road Halt railway station =

Disused railway station in England

Brandlesholme Road Halt

General information
- Location: Higher Woodhill, Bury; England
- Coordinates: 53.60121°N 2.30962°W
- Grid reference: SD794117

Other information
- Status: Disused

History
- Original company: Lancashire and Yorkshire Railway
- Pre-grouping: Lancashire and Yorkshire Railway
- Post-grouping: London, Midland and Scottish Railway

Key dates
- 3 July 1905: Station opened
- 5 May 1952: Station closed
Location

Brandlesholme Road Halt was a stopping point on the Bury to Holcombe Brook railway line from 1905 until the line closed in 1952.

== History ==
The line from Bury to Holcombe Brook had opened on 6 November 1882, and originally there were three intermediate stations. A service of steam railmotors was introduced on the line in July 1905, and four more intermediate stations were opened at the same time; these small stations, or halts, included one at Brandlesholme Road, 1 mile (1.6 km) from Bury, which opened on 3 July 1905. It closed with the end of passenger services on the line on 5 May 1952.

| Preceding station | Disused railways | Following station |
|---|---|---|
| Woolfold | L&YR; Bury to Holcombe Brook Line | Woodhill Road Halt |
