= Diggle railway station =

Former railway station in Greater Manchester, England

Diggle
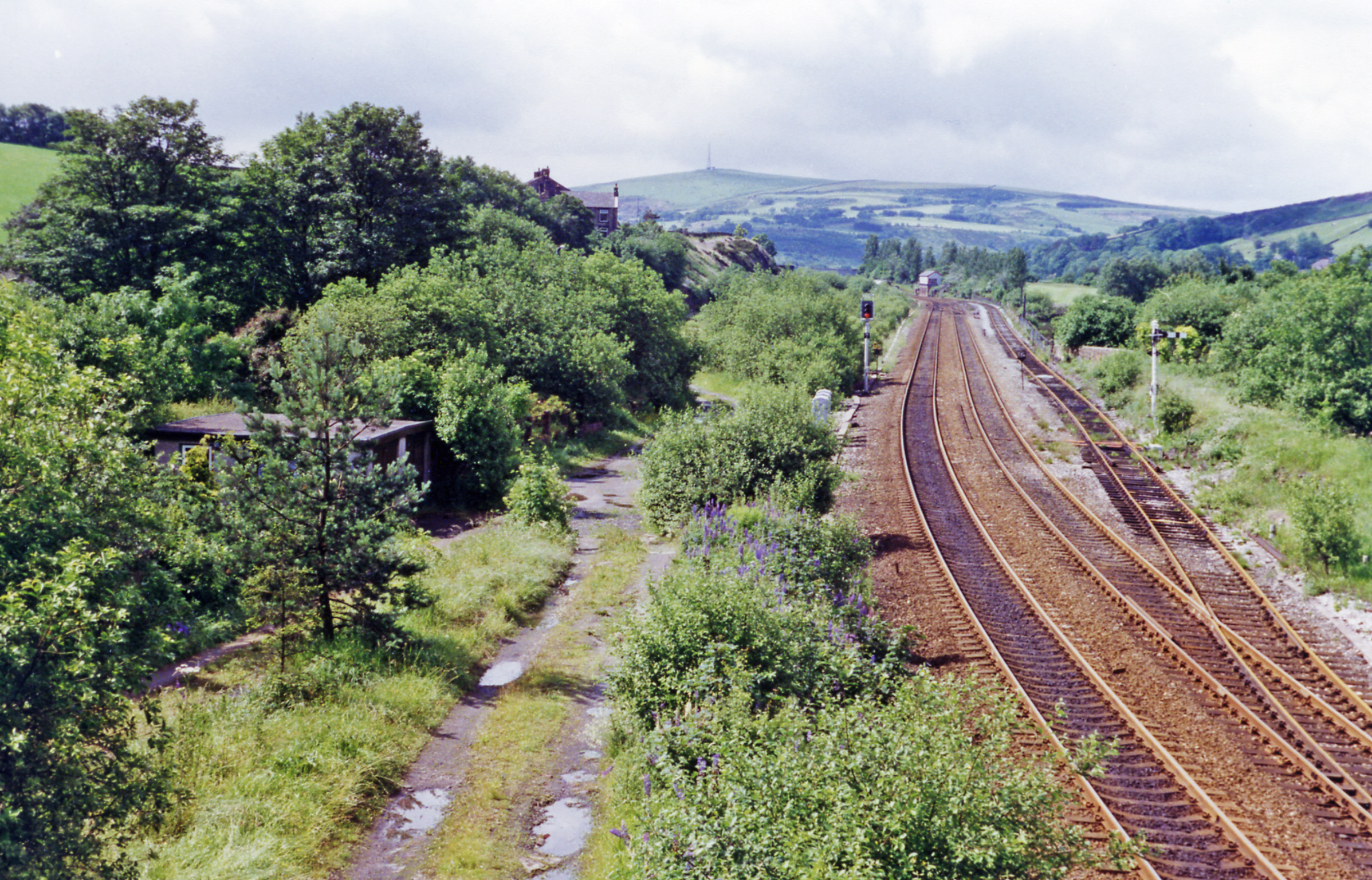
- Site of the former station, 1996

General information
- Location: Diggle, Metropolitan Borough of Oldham, England
- Coordinates: 53.5692°N 1.9904°W
- Grid reference: SE007080
- Platforms: 4

Other information
- Status: Disused

History
- Original company: London and North Western Railway
- Pre-grouping: London and North Western Railway
- Post-grouping: London, Midland and Scottish Railway

Key dates
- 1 August 1849: Station opened
- 7 October 1968: Station closed
Location

Diggle railway station served the village of Diggle, in Greater Manchester, England. It was a stop on the Huddersfield Line, sited to the north of Uppermill and immediately to the west of the Standedge Tunnels.

== History ==
The station was opened in 1849 along with the first railway tunnel and closed to passenger traffic in 1968. In its heyday, the station had platforms serving all four lines.

Preceding station	Historical railways	Following station
Saddleworth; Line open, station closed	London and North Western Railway; Huddersfield Line	Marsden; Line and station open
Uppermill; Line and station closed	London and North Western Railway; Micklehurst Line	Marsden; Line and station open

=== Incidents ===
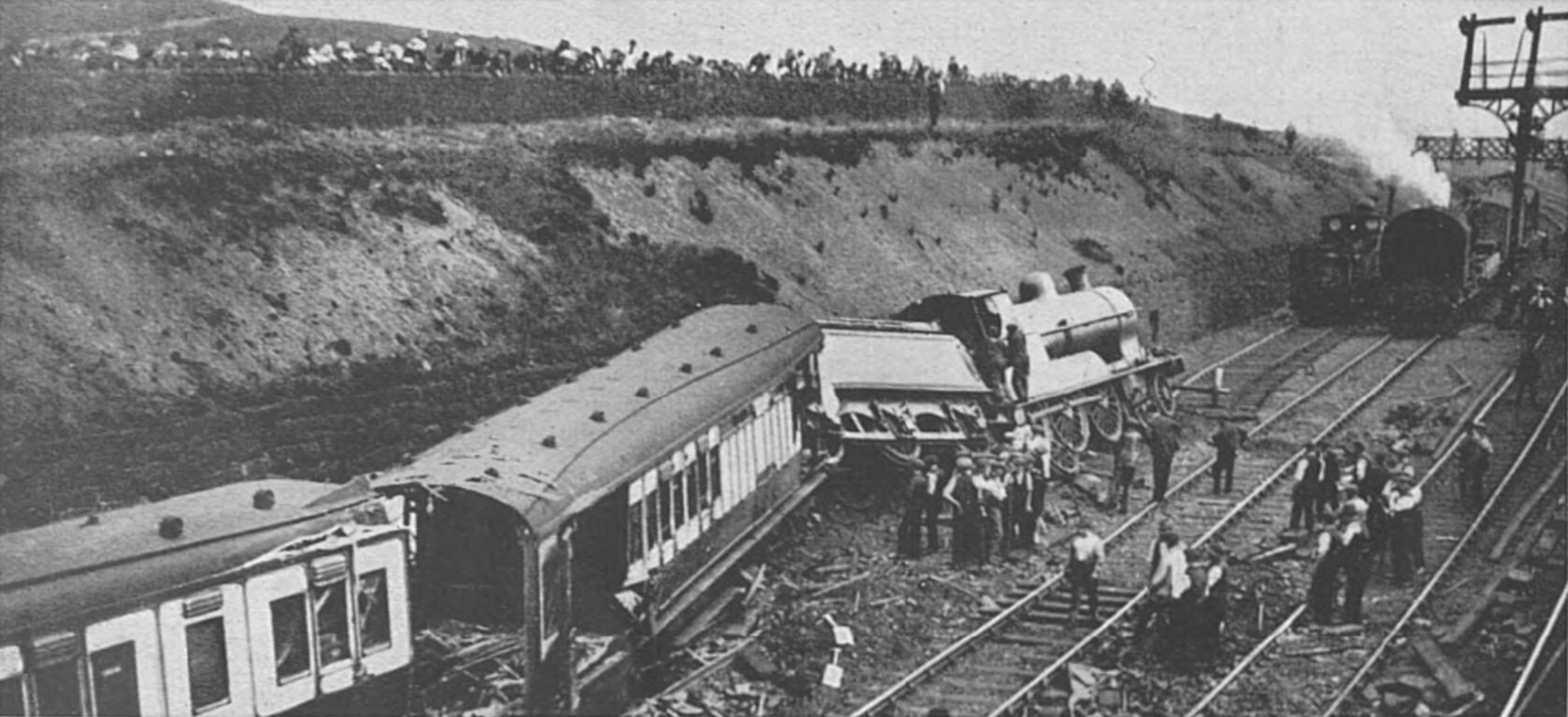
Railway accident in 1923 from The Sphere, 14 July 1923

On 5 July 1923, an express passenger train, hauled by LNWR Whale Experiment Class 4-6-0 no. 1406 George Findlay, was in a rear-end collision with a freight train. Four people were killed.

== The site today ==
Little remains of the station today; all of the buildings and platforms have been demolished. The nearby signal box remains operational for the Huddersfield Line that it still in use. The water tank for tunnel troughs and the station cottages are extant.

== Reopening campaigns ==
Local residents have periodically campaigned for the station to be reopened. This has often been connected to proposals to fully reopen the Standedge Tunnels.

In 2012, a renewed effort was launched by a local Liberal Democrat parish councillor. This was unsuccessful, as Transport for Greater Manchester concluded that much of the cited passenger demand would actually be abstracted from the existing station at nearby Greenfield.
