= Tottington railway station =

Former railway station in England

Tottington

General information
- Location: Tottington, Bury; England
- Coordinates: 53.61394°N 2.33753°W
- Grid reference: SD777131

Other information
- Status: Disused

History
- Original company: Bury and Tottington District Railway
- Pre-grouping: Lancashire and Yorkshire Railway
- Post-grouping: London, Midland and Scottish Railway

Key dates
- 6 November 1882: Station opened
- 5 May 1952: Station closed for passengers
- 19 August 1963: closed for freight
Location

Tottington Railway station served the town of Tottington in Greater Manchester (then Lancashire), England. It opened in 1882 and continued to serve passengers until the line closed to passengers in 1952 and freight in 1963.

== History ==
The Bury and Tottington District Railway opened from a junction to the north of Bury to a terminus at Holcombe Brook on 6 November 1882. Among the original stations was that at Tottington, situated 2 1/2 miles (4.0 km) from Bury.

The station closed when passenger services were withdrawn from the Holcombe Brook line on 5 May 1952; goods trains continued to serve Tottington until 19 August 1963.

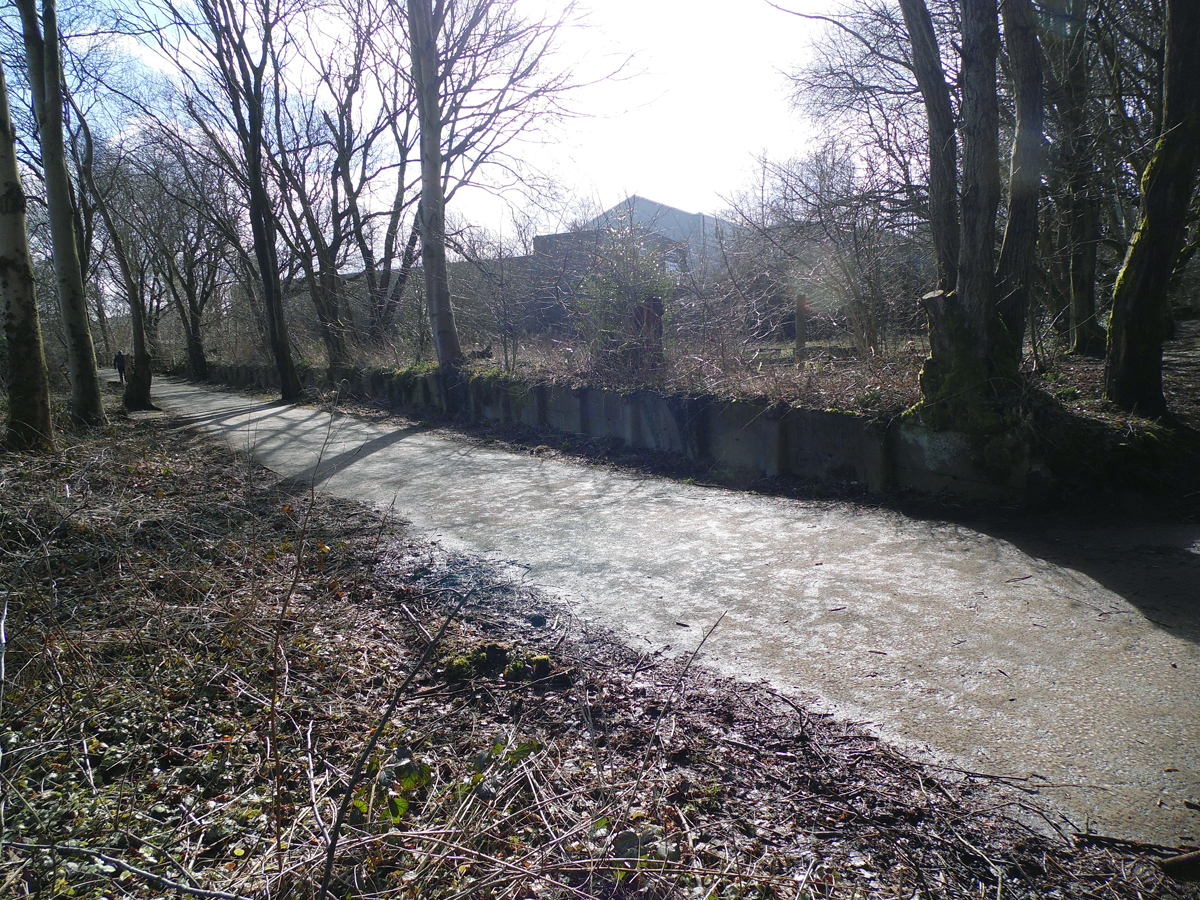
Photo of Tottington Railway Station platform remains

Preceding station	Disused railways	Following station
Knowles Halt	L&YR; Bury to Holcombe Brook Line	Sunny Wood Halt
