= Woolfold railway station =

Former railway station in England

Woolfold

General information
- Location: Woolfold, Bury; England
- Coordinates: 53.60507°N 2.32101°W
- Grid reference: SD789121
- Platforms: 2

Other information
- Status: Disused

History
- Original company: Bury and Tottington District Railway
- Pre-grouping: Lancashire and Yorkshire Railway
- Post-grouping: London, Midland and Scottish Railway

Key dates
- 6 November 1882: Station opened
- 5 May 1952: Station closed
Location

Woolfold railway station served the district of Woolfold in Bury from 1882 to 1952.

== History ==
The Bury and Tottington District Railway opened from a junction to the north of Bury to a terminus at Holcombe Brook on 6 November 1882. Among the original stations was that at Woolfold, situated 1 mile (1.6 km) from Bury.

The station closed when passenger services were withdrawn from the Holcombe Brook line on 5 May 1952.

| Preceding station | Disused railways | Following station |
|---|---|---|
| Sunny Wood Halt | L&YR; Bury to Holcombe Brook Line | Brandlesholme Road Halt |
