= Micklehurst railway station =

Former railway station in England

Coordinates: 53.5154°N 2.0359°W

Micklehurst
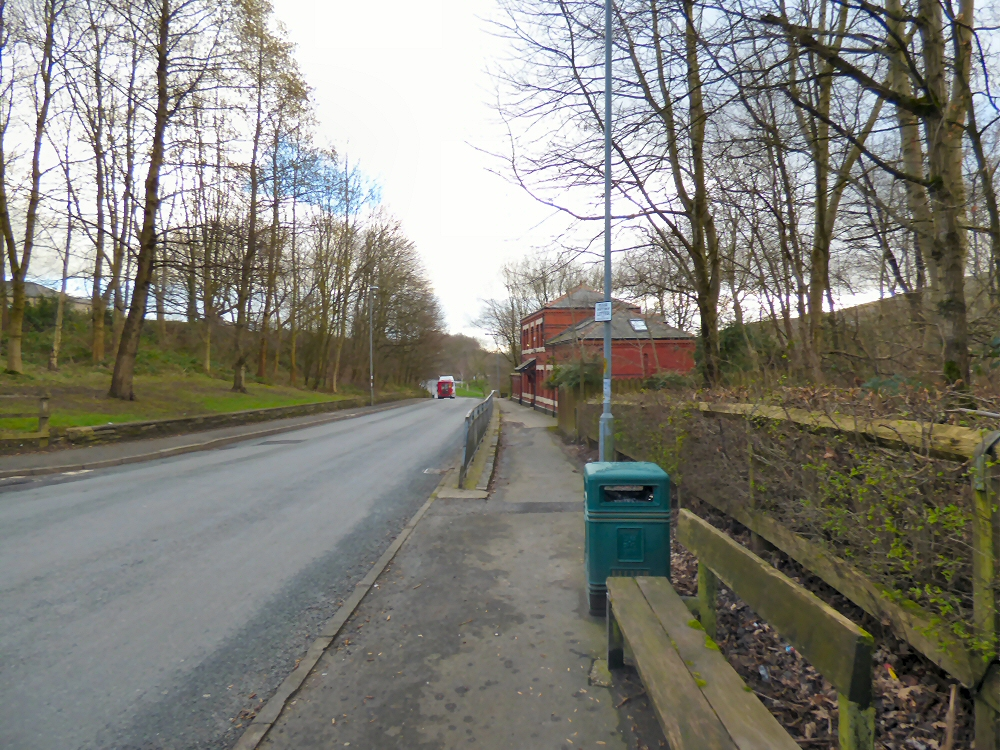
- Station Road, near the site of the station, in 2016

General information
- Location: Micklehurst, Tameside; England
- Grid reference: SD977021
- Platforms: 2

Other information
- Status: Disused

History
- Original company: London and North Western Railway
- Pre-grouping: London and North Western Railway

Key dates
- 1 July 1886: Opened
- 1 May 1907: Closed to passengers
- 19 February 1962: Closed for freight
Location

Micklehurst Railway Station served the town of Mossley in Cheshire. It was built by the London and North Western Railway on its Micklehurst Line. The station closed for passengers in 1907 and to freight on 19 February 1962 but the line through the station remained open for passenger traffic until 7 September 1964. The station building on the up (Diggle to Stalybridge) side is still standing and is used as a private residence.

At present, the nearest operational station to Micklehurst is Mossley railway station

Preceding station	Disused railways	Following station
Staley and Millbrook	L&NW; Micklehurst Line	Friezland
