= Friezland railway station =

Former railway station in England

Coordinates: 53.5338°N 2.0115°W

Friezland
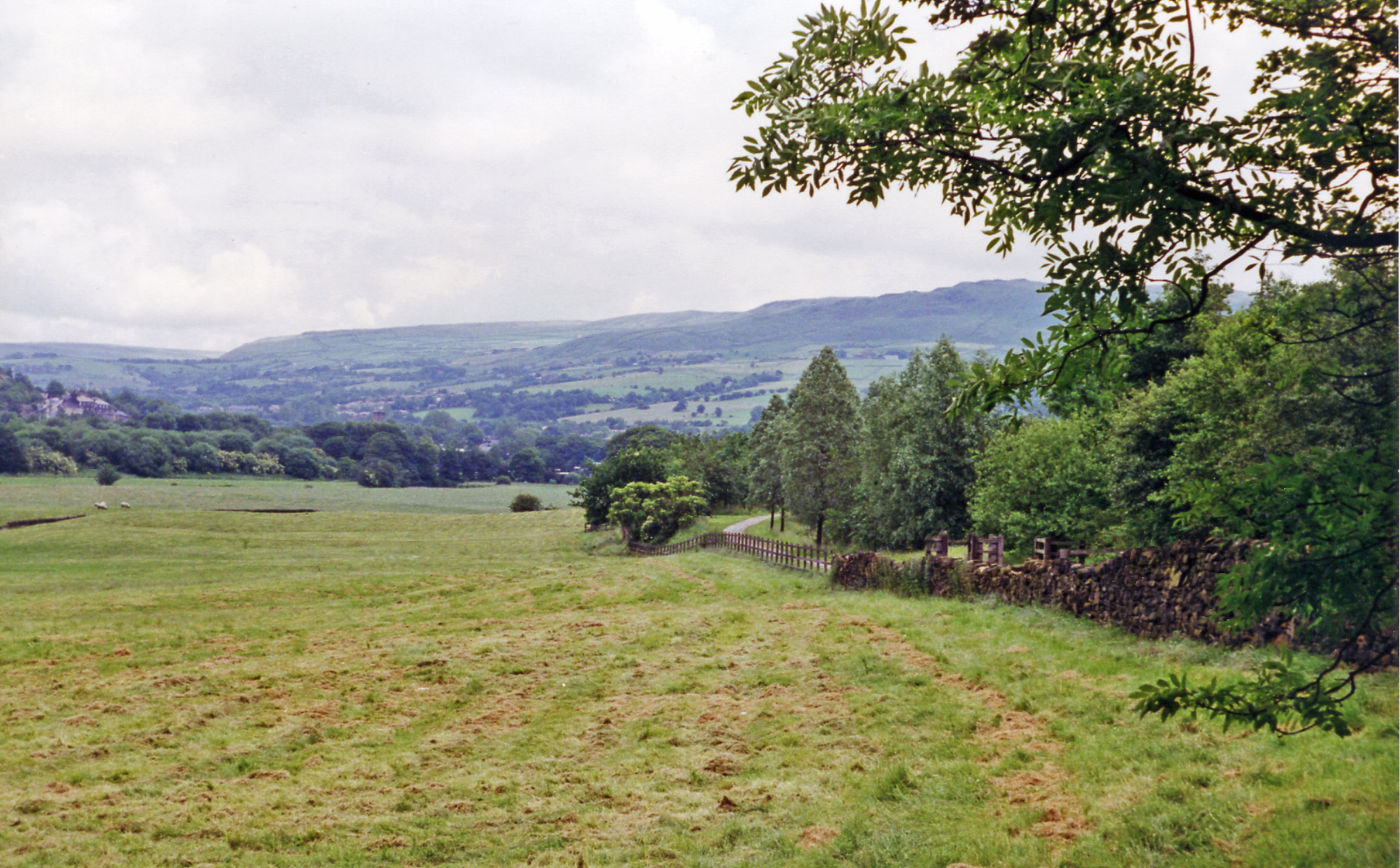
- The site of the station in 1996

General information
- Location: Friezland, Oldham; England
- Grid reference: SD993041
- Platforms: 2

Other information
- Status: Disused

History
- Original company: London and North Western Railway
- Pre-grouping: London and North Western Railway

Key dates
- 1 July 1886: Station opens
- 1 January 1917: Station closes to passengers
- 22 February 1965: closed to freight
Location

Friezland Railway Station served the Hamlet of Friezland in Saddleworth until closure on 1 January 1917. It was built by the London and North Western Railway on its Micklehurst Line.

On 19 August 1909 a passenger train was derailed at Friezland. Both train crew were killed.

The station closed for passenger traffic on 1 January 1917 but regular passenger traffic continued to pass through until 1964. Freight services to the station were withdrawn in 1965 and the line through the station was closed in 1966. The village is now served by Greenfield railway station.

Preceding station	Disused railways	Following station
Micklehurst	L&NW; Micklehurst Line	Uppermill
