= Kirklees Brook =

River in Greater Manchester, England

Coordinates: 53.621967°N 2.348566°W

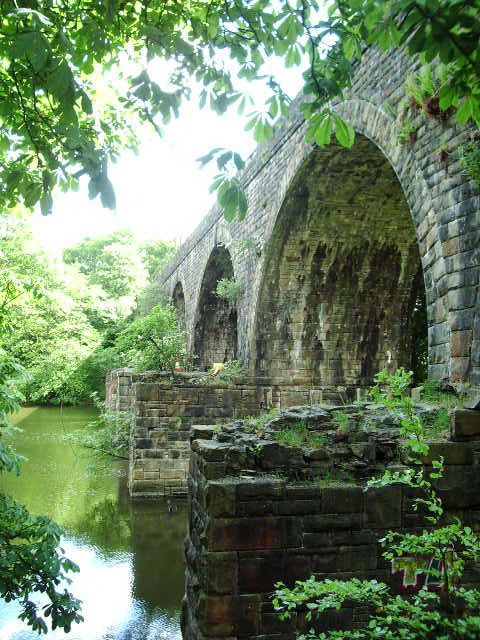
Reservoir at Brookhouse Mill

Kirklees Brook is a minor river in Greater Manchester, England. It is 6.56 miles (10.556 km) long and including tributaries has a catchment area of 5.23 square miles (13.547 km^{2}).

Kirklees Brook springs from the slopes of Holcombe Moor at Grainings on the modern boundary with Lancashire, north of Hawkshaw, flowing south. At Brookhouse Mill between Greenmount and Tottington there are a number of small connected reservoirs. It is known as Woodhill Brook for a short stretch before joining the River Irwell in the Woodhill area of Bury.

Next confluence upstream	River Irwell	Next confluence downstream
River Ogden (West)	Kirklees Brook	River Roch (East)
