= Uppermill railway station =

Former railway station in England

Upper Mill

General information
- Location: Uppermill, Oldham; England
- Coordinates: 53.54771°N 2.00223°W
- Grid reference: SD999057
- Platforms: 2

Other information
- Status: Disused

History
- Original company: London and North Western Railway
- Pre-grouping: London and North Western Railway

Key dates
- 1 July 1886: Station opens
- 1 January 1917: Station closes
- 15 June 1964: Closed for freight
Location

Uppermill Railway Station served the village of Uppermill in the West Riding of Yorkshire. It was built by the London and North Western Railway on their Micklehurst Line from Stalybridge to Diggle and Huddersfield. It opened in 1886 and closed to passengers in 1917. Regular passenger trains continued to pass through the station until 1964 and the line was closed completely in 1966.

Preceding station	Disused railways	Following station
Friezland	London and North Western Railway; Micklehurst Line	Diggle; Line open, station closed
