= Micklehurst Line =

The Micklehurst Line was a railway line between Stalybridge, Cheshire, and Diggle junction in the West Riding of Yorkshire (now part of Greater Manchester). The line, approximately eight miles (13 km) long, was also sometimes referred to as the Micklehurst Loop and the Stalybridge and Diggle Loop Line.

== Construction and opening ==
The London and North Western Railway had built its line from Stalybridge to Huddersfield through Standedge tunnel between 1847 and 1849 and it opened on 1 August 1849 for through trains between Liverpool Lime Street, Manchester Victoria, Huddersfield and Leeds. The increasing number of passenger and goods trains on the route required a second single-bore tunnel to be built, opening in February 1871. A further growth in traffic required construction of a double-track tunnel which was completed in August 1894.

To effectively serve the four railway tracks through the Standedge tunnels, an additional twin-track railway line was required. The original track had been built on the steep, western slopes of the Tame Valley making it difficult to add a second pair of tracks alongside, so the new line was built in parallel, along the eastern side of the valley and about one mile distant. The new line was completed in 1885.

== Passenger train service and stations ==
Whilst the line had mainly been built with through goods trains in mind, the LNWR built four intermediate passenger stations on the line, all opening on 3 May 1886. The first out of Stalybridge was Staley and Millbrook; Next was Micklehurst; the third station from Stalybridge was Friezland and the nearest to the junction at Diggle and the tunnel entrance was Uppermill. Passenger traffic in this sparsely populated Pennine valley was light. Micklehurst was closed to passengers on 1 May 1907; Staley and Millbrook on 1 November 1909; and Uppermill and Friezland stations on 1 January 1917.

== Goods train traffic ==
The line had been built primarily to handle the many goods trains that ran between Lancashire and Yorkshire. A typical weekday in Autumn 1952 saw at least thirty-seven eastbound goods trains running into Yorkshire using the Micklehurst Loop and a similar number of westbound trains. The loop had easier gradients than the original line through Mossley and Greenfield and this caused most of the heavy goods trains to use it.

Daily local freight trains called at each of the stations to shunt wagons in the goods yards until and after their closure to passengers, Uppermill closing for goods traffic on 15 June 1964. The section of the line from Diggle to Staley and Millbrook was closed to all traffic on 3 October 1966, with the remaining section from Stalybridge to Staley and Millbrook surviving for a few more years to serve Hartshead Power Station near the latter location.

== Present day ==
The track was lifted soon after the line's closure in the 1960s although the vast majority of the original trackbed is now part of the Pennine Bridleway. Royal George tunnel between Greenfield and Micklehurst was buried with both portals landscaped soon after the line closure. The demolition of the Greenfield viaduct and other bridges in the area was completed in 1979. Butterhouse tunnel between Uppermill and Diggle remains intact although the Southern Uppermill portal was backfilled and landscaped in the late 1980s. The Northern portal in Diggle has been untouched since the line's closure. Most of the station buildings along the route remain intact.
