= Staley and Millbrook railway station =

Former railway station in England

Coordinates: 53.495°N 2.039°W

Staley and Millbrook
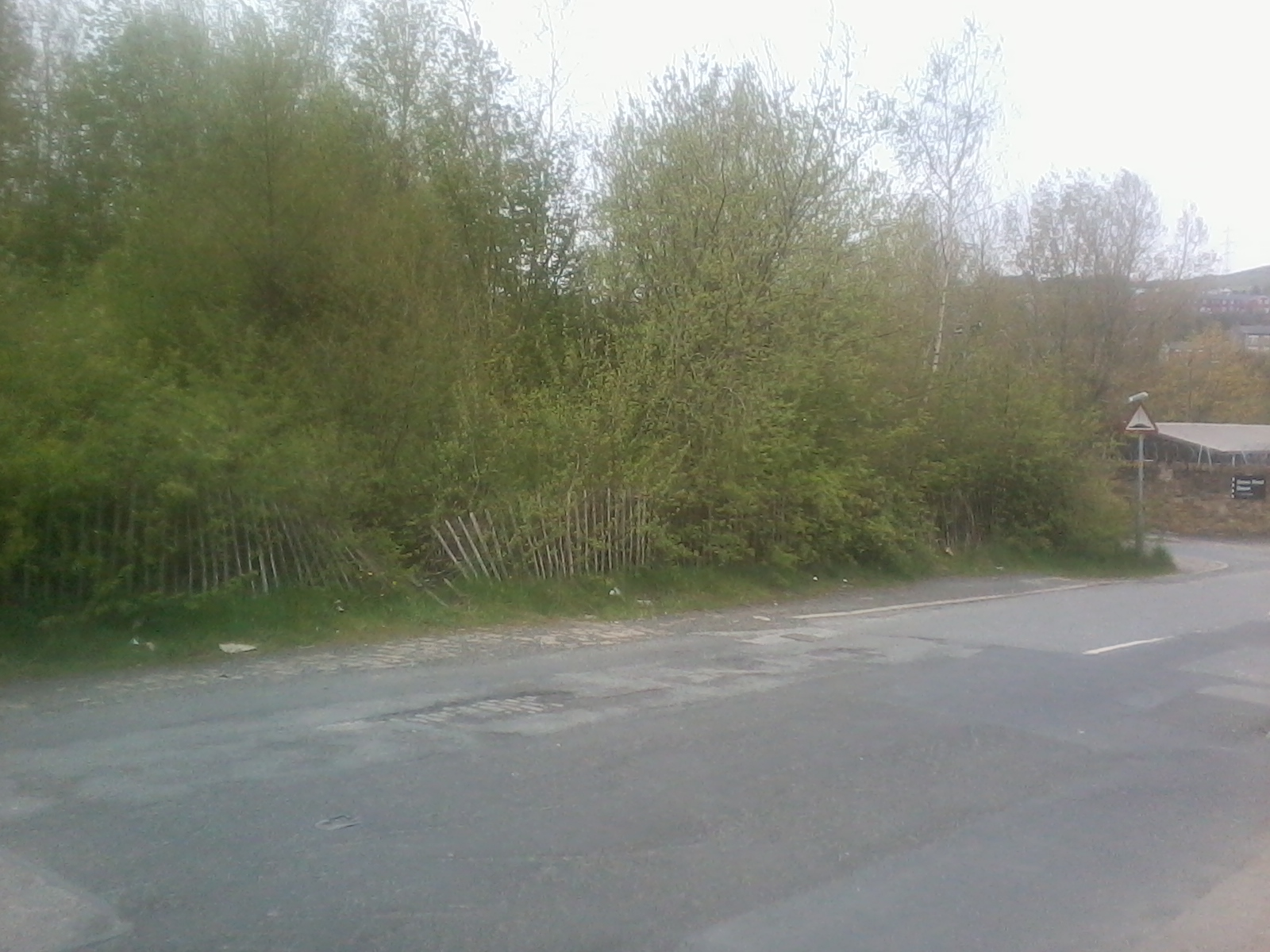
- The station site in 2012

General information
- Location: Millbrook, Tameside; England
- Grid reference: SJ975998
- Platforms: 2

Other information
- Status: Disused

History
- Original company: London and North Western Railway
- Pre-grouping: London and North Western Railway

Key dates
- 1 July 1886: Station opens
- 1 November 1909: Station closes for passengers
- 20 April 1964: closed for freight
Location

Staley and Millbrook railway station served the villages Staley and Millbrook in Stalybridge, Cheshire (later Tameside).

The station was built by the London and North Western Railway on the Micklehurst Line and opened on 3 May 1886. It served passengers until closure on 1 November 1909. The line through the station remained open for passenger traffic until 7 September 1964 and for freight until 1972.

Preceding station	Disused railways	Following station
Stalybridge	L&NW; Micklehurst Line	Micklehurst
