= Greenmount, Greater Manchester =

Coordinates: 53.627°N 2.330°W

Greenmount
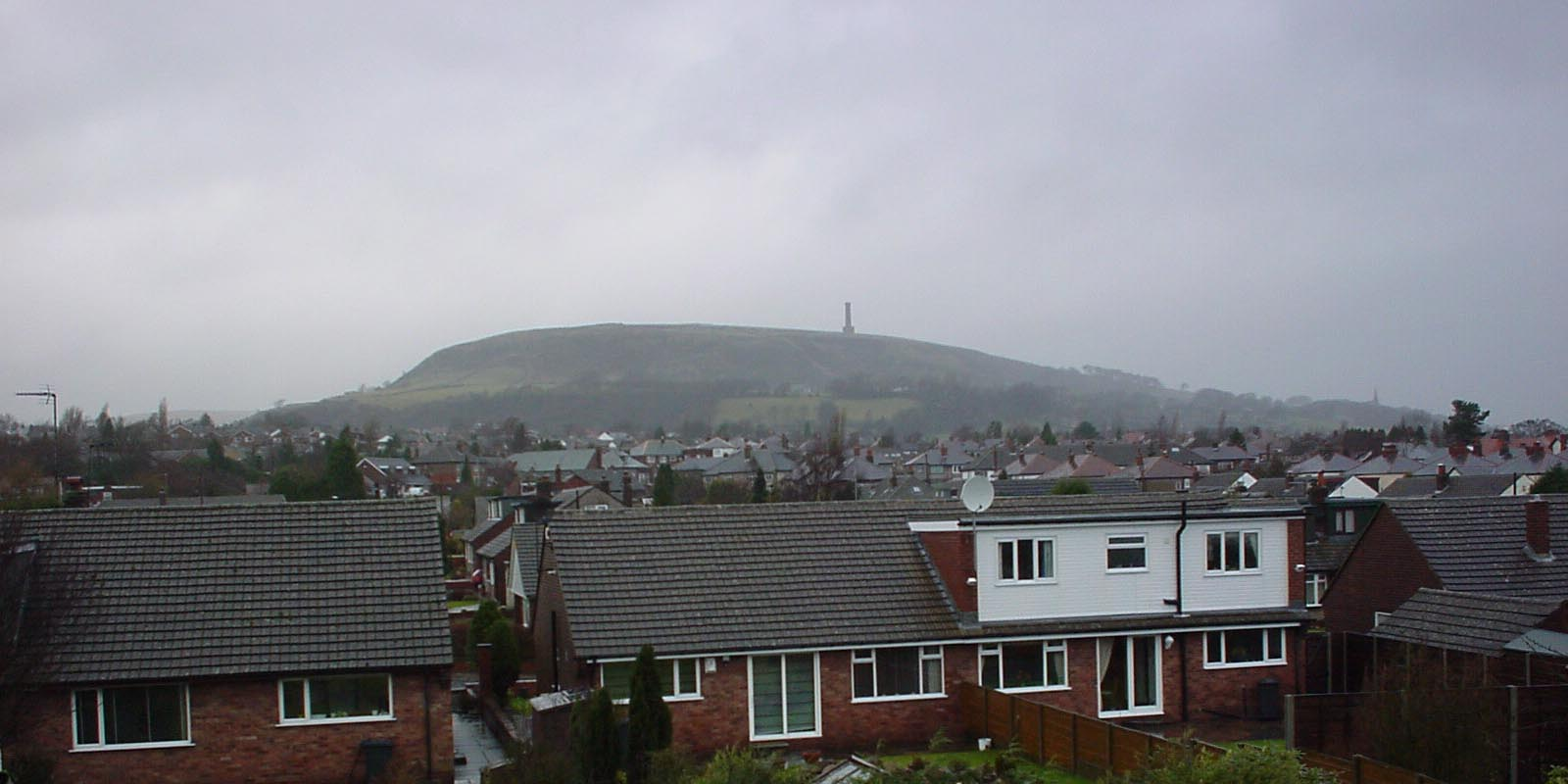
- Peel Tower on Harcles Hill above Greenmount

- Location within Greater Manchester
- OS grid reference: SD777143
- Metropolitan borough: Bury
- Metropolitan county: Greater Manchester
- Region: North West
- Country: England
- Sovereign state: United Kingdom
- Post town: BURY
- Postcode district: BL8
- Dialling code: 01204
- Police: Greater Manchester
- Fire: Greater Manchester
- Ambulance: North West
- UK Parliament: Bury North

Greenmount is a village in Tottington in the West Pennine Moors, in the northern part of the Metropolitan Borough of Bury, in Greater Manchester, England.

Historically a part of Lancashire, Greenmount is 13 miles (21 km) north of Manchester, 1 mile (2 km) to the northeast of Tottington, and 2 miles (3 km) south of Ramsbottom.

== History ==
Greenmount came into existence in 1848 when the Sunday School was built. It was originally spelt Green Mount. Greenmount was, in 1848, on the outskirts of Tottington. People who lived near to the Sunday School included the name of Greenmount in their address and gradually this was extended to the surrounding area and became the village name. The ward boundaries came into existence after the Local Government Act 1894. They were changed in 1979.

== Governance ==
Since 1974, as part of the Local Government Act 1972, Greenmount has formed part of the Metropolitan Borough of Bury of Greater Manchester.

== Geography ==
The village of Greenmount is 13 miles (20.9 km) north of Manchester.

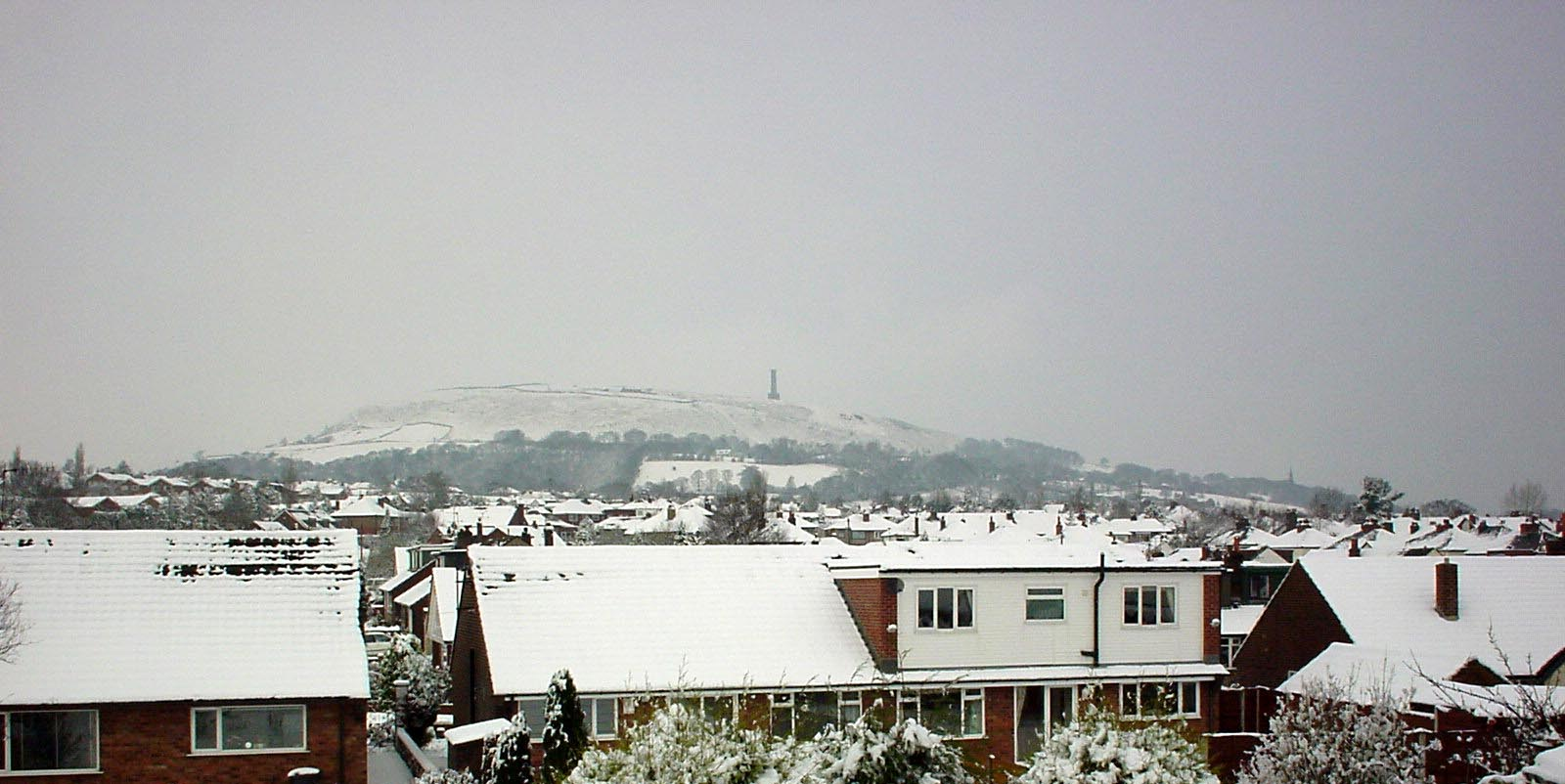
Peel Tower, Harcles Hill

The village has a nonconformist church, Greenmount United Reformed Church.

== Kirklees Trail / former railway line ==
At one time, Greenmount village was a stopping point from Bury to Holcombe Brook via a railway line operated by the Lancashire and Yorkshire Railway. This line was closed to passengers in 1968. The old railway line is now the central footpath through a park and nature trail through Kirklees Valley called Kirklees Trail. The footpath also forms part of National Cycle Route 6, connecting Greenmount to Manchester city centre to the south. There is also a lake popular with fishermen, an impressive bridge over the river, a wildlife rescue centre (Kirklees Valley Wildlife Rescue) and a cricket club, all situated along the trail.

== Notable people ==
Brookhouse Farm on Holcombe Road has a blue plaque marking it as the 17th century home of Henry Wood, a Quaker and supporter of Oliver Cromwell who emigrated to New Jersey where he founded the city of Woodbury.

The Manchester United teammates and brothers Gary and Phil Neville and their father Neville Neville played cricket at Greenmount Cricket club (in the Bolton Cricket League).

TV presenter (and Emmerdale actor) Lisa Riley was born and raised in Tottington. Antony Cotton, star of the soap opera Coronation Street, was also born and raised in the village.
