= Bury–Holcombe Brook line =

Defunct railway line

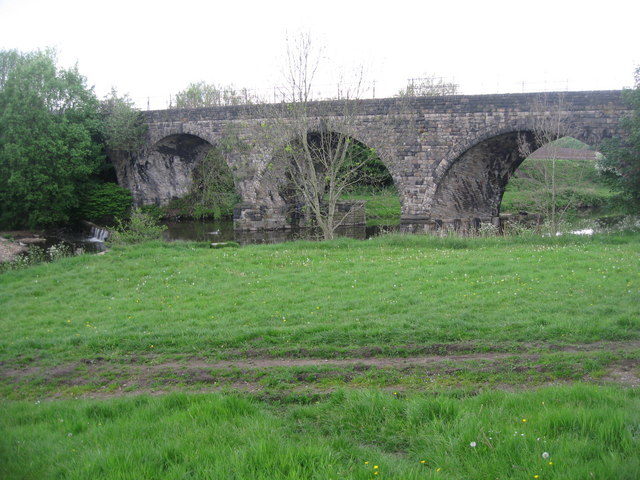
This viaduct, which spans the river Irwell, was part of the Bury–Holcombe Brook branch line built in 1882. The railway line closed in 1963 but the old track bed is still in use today as the Kirklees Trail cycle way and footpath.

The Bury–Holcombe Brook line was a 3 3/4-mile (6.0 km) single-track railway line which ran between Bury Bolton Street railway station and Holcombe Brook railway station via seven intermediate stations, Woodhill Road Halt, Brandlesholme Road Halt, Woolfold, Sunny Wood Halt, Tottington, Knowles Halt, and Greenmount.

== History ==
Bury and Tottington District Railway Act 1877
- Act of Parliament
- Parliament of the United Kingdom
- Long title: An Act for making a Railway from Bury to Tottington, with branches, in the county palatine of Lancaster.
- Citation: 40 & 41 Vict. c. clvii

Dates
- Royal assent: 2 August 1877

Text of statute as originally enacted

Bury and Tottington District Railway Act 1880
- Act of Parliament
- Parliament of the United Kingdom
- Long title: An Act to authorise the Bury and Tottington District Railway Company to raise additional Capital; and for other purposes.
- Citation: 43 & 44 Vict. c. iv

Dates
- Royal assent: 29 June 1880

Text of statute as originally enacted

Lancashire and Yorkshire Railway Act 1888
- Act of Parliament
- Parliament of the United Kingdom
- Long title: An Act for conferring further Powers on the Lancashire and Yorkshire Railway Company with relation to their Undertaking and to enable them to acquire the Undertaking of the Bury and Tottington District Railway Company and to confer further Powers on the Halifax High Level and North and South Junction Railway Company with respect to their Undertaking and for other purposes.
- Citation: 51 & 52 Vict. c. cxl

Dates
- Royal assent: 24 July 1888

Text of statute as originally enacted

Authorised by the Bury and Tottington District Railway Act 1877 (40 & 41 Vict. c. clvii) and opened in 1882 by the Bury and Tottington District Railway, the line was taken over by the Lancashire and Yorkshire Railway by the Lancashire and Yorkshire Railway Act 1888 (51 & 52 Vict. c. cxl). Initially the line had stations at Woolfold, Greenmount, Tottington and Holcombe Brook with additional halts opening at Woodhill Road, Brandlesholme Road, Sunnywood and Knowles Crossing in 1905.

The railways herein-before referred to and authorised by this Act are wholly situate in the county palatine of Lancaster, and are—
- A railway (No. 1), three miles three furlongs four chains and seventy-five links in length, (Note: 3 miles 34.75 chains (3.43 miles, 5.53 km)) commencing in the township of Elton, in the parish and borough of Bury, by a junction with the East Lancashire Line of the Lancashire and Yorkshire Railway Company nearly opposite the house called Chamber Hall, and terminating in the township of Tottington Lower End, in the said parish of Bury, at or near the junction of the Elton and Blackburn turnpike road with the highway (formerly the Edenfield and Little Bolton turnpike road) at the southern side of the village of Holcombe Brook:
- A railway (No. 2), on the deposited plans and sections called (No. 4), wholly situate in the said township of Tottington Lower End, two furlongs and one chain in length, (Note: 21 chains (0.26 mi; 0.42 km)) commencing by a junction with Railway (No. 1) at or near a point on the road leading from Moss Side to Hopkinsons about one hundred and fifty yards, measured along that road in a south-westerly direction, from the bridge over Kirklees Brook, and terminating near Messrs. John Olive and Sons' waggon building shed at Woolfold, about three chains, measured in a south-westerly direction, from the highway leading from Bury to Tottington.
— Section 5, Bury and Tottington District Railway Act 1877 (40 & 41 Vict. c. clvii)

Passenger services operated until 1952, while freight services continued to Holcombe Brook until 1960 and Tottington until 1963.

== Electrification ==
In 1912 Dick, Kerr & Co.‘s Preston factory were considering tendering for a Brazilian contract and approached the Lancashire and Yorkshire Railway to use the branch for test purposes at Dick, Kerr's expense. The line from Bury Bolton Street Station to Holcombe Brook was electrified with the overhead 3.5 kV dc system, rolling stock was also supplied at their cost. After prolonged trials the trains entered public use on 29 July 1913. The L&Y purchased the equipment and stock on the successful completion of the trials in 1916. During 1917 work started on the branch to convert to third rail to match the Manchester to Bury system. The third rail trains started to run on 29 March 1918.

== Kirklees Trail ==
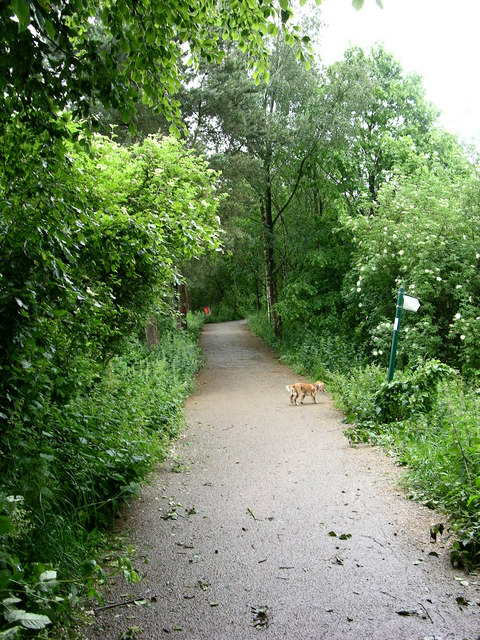
The start of the Kirklees Trail at Greenmount in 2007

The section of the line from Greenmount to Bury town centre has been converted into a pedestrian and cycle route, the Kirklees Trail, forming part of National Cycle Route 6. Sustrans built a new 65 metres (213 ft) long bridge over the Kirklees Valley to replace the demolished Woolfold viaduct.

== See also ==
- LYR electric units
