= Holcombe Brook railway station =

Former railway station in England

Holcombe Brook

General information
- Location: Holcombe Brook, Bury; England
- Coordinates: 53.63185°N 2.33561°W
- Grid reference: SD779151

Other information
- Status: Disused

History
- Original company: Bury and Tottington District Railway
- Pre-grouping: Lancashire and Yorkshire Railway
- Post-grouping: London, Midland and Scottish Railway

Key dates
- 6 November 1882: Station opened
- 5 May 1952: Station closed
Location

Holcombe Brook railway station was the terminus of the Bury to Holcombe Brook Line in England and served the village of Holcombe Brook in the Metropolitan Borough of Bury.

== History ==
The Bury and Tottington District Railway opened on 6 November 1882. The northern terminus of the line was at Holcombe Brook, 3 3/4 miles (6.0 km) from Bury.

The station closed when passenger services were withdrawn from the line on 5 May 1952; goods trains continued to serve Holcombe Brook until 2 May 1960. The station was demolished and the site is now occupied by a shopping development.

Preceding station	Disused railways	Following station
Terminus	L&YR; Bury to Holcombe Brook Line	Greenmount
