= Metropolitan Borough of Bury =

Borough of Greater Manchester, England

- Metropolitan borough
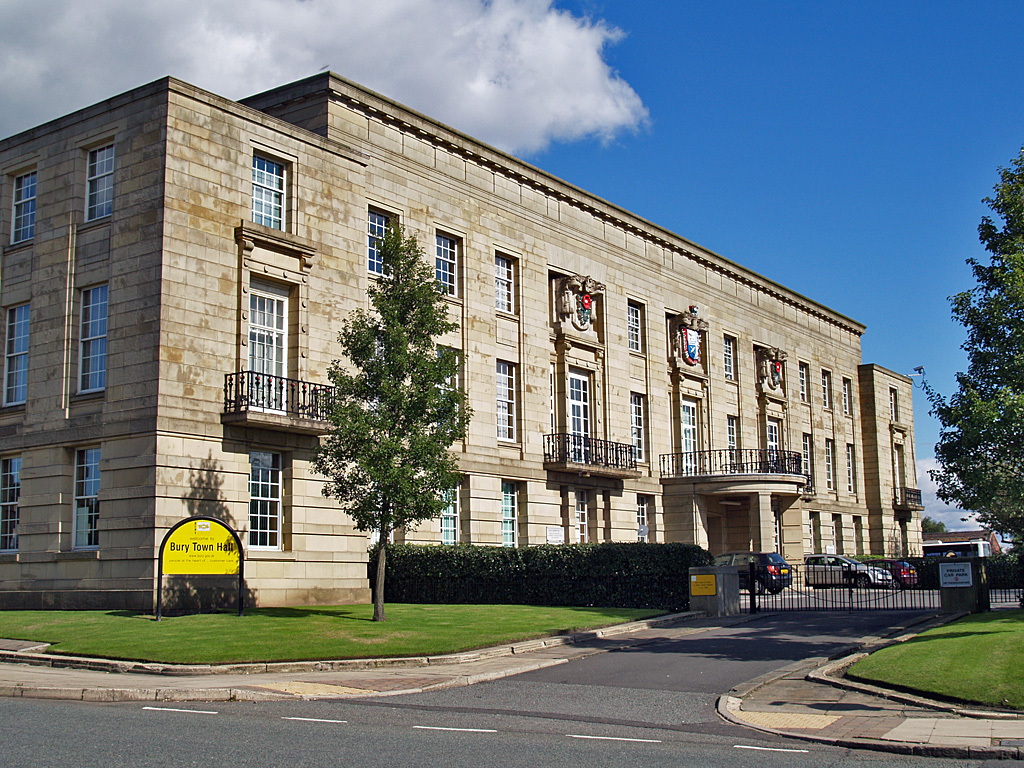
- Bury Town Hall

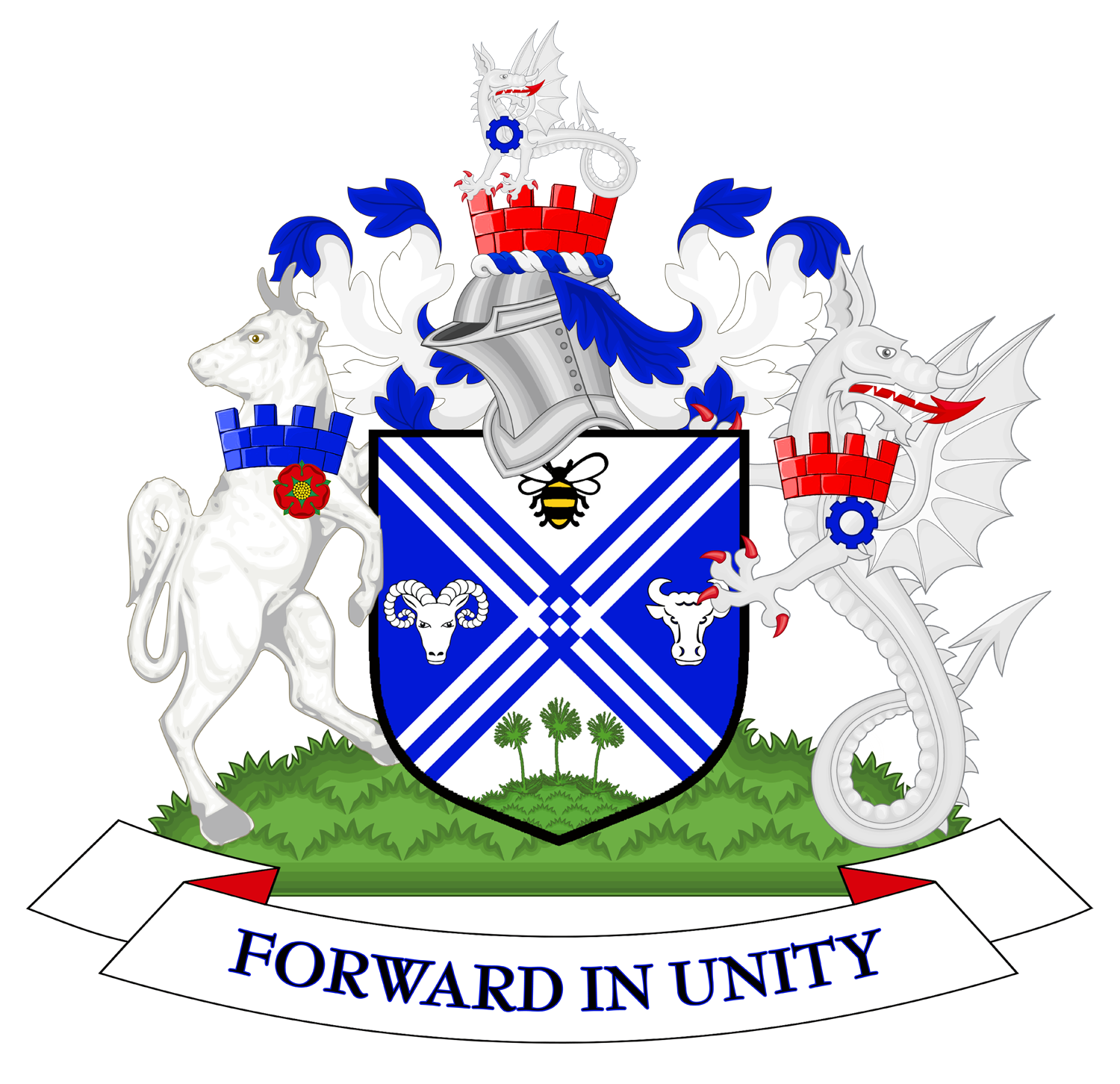
- Coat of arms
- Motto: Forward in unity
- Bury shown within Greater Manchester
- Coordinates: 53°35′34″N 2°17′53″W
- Sovereign state: United Kingdom
- Country: England
- Region: North West
- Ceremonial county and city region: Greater Manchester
- Incorporated: 1 April 1974
- Named for: Bury
- Administrative HQ: Bury Town Hall

Government
  - Type: Metropolitan borough
  - Body: Bury Metropolitan Borough Council
  - Executive: Leader and cabinet
  - Control: Labour
  - Leader: Eamonn O'Brien (L)
  - Mayor: Sandra Walmsley
  - MPs: 2 MPs: James Frith (L); Christian Wakeford (L)

Area
  - Total: 99 km^{2} (38 sq mi)
  - Rank: 197th

Population (2025)
  - Total: 199,271
  - Rank: 103rd
  - Density: 2,004/km^{2} (5,190/sq mi)

Ethnicity (2021)
  - Ethnic groups: List: 82.9% White; 10.6% Asian; 2.6% Mixed; 1.9% Black; 1.9% other

Religion (2021)
  - Religion: List: 48.8% Christianity; 29.4% no religion; 9.9% Islam; 5.5% Judaism; 0.5% Hinduism; 0.3% Sikhism; 0.3% Buddhism; 0.3% other; 4.9% not stated
- Time zone: UTC+0 (GMT)
  - Summer (DST): UTC+1 (BST)
- Postcode area: BL; M
- Dialling code: 0161
- ISO 3166 code: GB-BUR
- GSS code: E08000002
- Website: www.bury.gov.uk

The Metropolitan Borough of Bury is a metropolitan borough of Greater Manchester in England. It is north of Manchester, to the east of Bolton and west of Rochdale. The borough is centred around the town of Bury but also includes the other towns of Ramsbottom, Tottington, Radcliffe, Whitefield and Prestwich. Bury bounds the Lancashire districts of Rossendale and Blackburn with Darwen to the north. With a population of 199,271 in 2025, it is the smallest borough in Greater Manchester.

Within the boundaries of the historic county of Lancashire, the Metropolitan Borough of Bury, which covers 99 square kilometres (38 sq mi), was created on 1 April 1974, with the transfer of functions from the County Borough of Bury and the boroughs of Prestwich and Radcliffe, along with the urban districts of Tottington and Whitefield, and part of the urban district of Ramsbottom, all previously in Lancashire.

== History ==
The Metropolitan Borough of Bury was created on 1 April 1974, by the Local Government Act 1972 as one of the ten metropolitan districts of Greater Manchester. Prior to this, the area was represented by six other boroughs and districts:

- Bury (County Borough)
- Prestwich (Municipal Borough)
- Radcliffe (Municipal Borough)
- Ramsbottom (Urban District) (part)
- Tottington (Urban District)
- Whitefield (Urban District)

In 2006, facing a budget shortfall of over £10 million, Bury Metropolitan Council decided to sell its painting by L. S. Lowry called "A Riverbank". The work, which depicts the River Irwell and cost £175 in 1951, was expected to fetch between £500,000 and £800,000. Between the announcement and the sale at Christie's, the council was accused of "selling off the family silver". The authority, which had the painting on display at Bury Art Museum, said it was putting its people before a picture. The painting raised £1.25 million for the authority on 17 November 2006 at the auction in London, costing the bidder £1,408,000 including commission. Consequently, the council's membership of the Museums Association was cancelled and it was deregistered by the Museums, Libraries and Archives Council, a quango that was disbanded in 2011, transferring some of its duties to Arts Council England.

In July 2008 the borough was the first in Greater Manchester to hold a referendum on whether to install a directly-elected mayor. This was the result of a campaign against congestion charge plans that raised a petition with 9,460 names, well above the required five per cent of voters needed to trigger a mayoral vote. The proposal to have an elected mayor was rejected.

== Governance ==
=== Parliamentary constituencies ===
The Metropolitan Borough of Bury currently consists of two parliamentary constituencies:

- Bury North – James Frith (Labour)
- Bury South – Christian Wakeford (Labour)

=== Council ===
The borough has 17 wards, each represented by three councillors to form a council of 51 members. As of 2020, there were 148,595 electors, with an average of 2,914 per councillor.

At the 2023 Bury Metropolitan Borough Council election the average turnout to vote was 34.3%, varying locally from 45% in North Manor ward to only 25% in Bury East.

=== Combined Authority ===
The borough falls under the Greater Manchester Combined Authority, and is represented by the council leader, Eamonn O'Brien.

=== Unparished areas ===
The entirety of the borough is unparished.

== Coat of arms ==
The coat of arms contains symbols representing the six constituent towns, with the design based on the arms of the old County Borough of Bury. The shield is divided diagonally by interweaving alluding to the textile industry. On the shield are a bee (representing industry) and papyrus (papermaking) from Bury; a ram's head and a bullock's head represent Ramsbottom and Tottington respectively. The silver field represents Whitefield, whilst the shield is supported with figures from the crests of Radcliffe and Prestwich. These represent the Radcliffe and Egerton families and wear a red rose (for Lancashire) and a cogwheel (for industry). The motto 'Forward in Unity' sits on a scroll under the shield.

== Demography ==
Ethnic Group (2021 Census)	Population	% of total
English, Welsh, Scottish, Northern Irish or British	151,528	78.2%
Pakistani	15,148	7.8%
Other White	6,730	3.5%
Any other ethnic group	3,014	1.6%
African	2,520	1.3%
Irish	2,192	1.1%
Other Asian	2,044	1.1%
Indian	1,866	1.0%
White and Asian	1,670	0.9%
White and Black Caribbean	1,622	0.8%
Other Mixed or Multiple ethnic groups	1,085	0.6%
Chinese	1,055	0.5%
White and Black African	746	0.4%
Bangladeshi	480	0.2%
Other Black	469	0.2%
Arab	715	0.1%
Gypsy or Irish Traveller	132	0.1%
Roma	134	0.1%
Total	193,846	

At the 2021 UK census, the Metropolitan Borough of Bury had a total population of 193,846. The population density is 1,815/km^{2} (4,700/sq mi).

When the Census was taken there were 74,335 households in Bury with an average of 2.4 persons in each one. In more detail, 39.4% of households were married couples living together, 28.9% were one-person households, 8.7% were co-habiting couples and 10.7% were lone parents. Of all the households 75.11% lived in houses they owned, with or without a mortgage, significantly higher than the national average of 68.07%.

Of people aged 16–74 in Bury 42.93% were economically active in 2001, higher than the national average of 40.81%. 29.2% of this age group (16–74) had no academic qualifications, slightly higher than 28.9% in all of England.

5.8% of Bury's residents were born outside the United Kingdom, significantly lower than the national average of 9.2%. The largest minority group was recorded as Asian, at 4% of the population.

Country/Region of Birth (2021 Census)	Population	% of total
United Kingdom	170,444	87.9%
Middle East and Asia	10,966	5.7%
Other Europe	6,879	3.5%
Africa	2,818	1.5%
Ireland	1,427	0.7%
The Americas and the Caribbean	1,048	0.6%
Oceania, Antarctica and other	236	0.1%
Total	193,846	

=== Population and employment change ===
Historical population
Year	Pop.	±%
1801	12,169	—
1811	14,987	+23.2%
1821	17,646	+17.7%
1831	22,331	+26.5%
1841	33,696	+50.9%
1851	38,613	+14.6%
1861	61,749	+59.9%
1871	84,885	+37.5%
1881	108,020	+27.3%
1891	117,677	+8.9%
1901	123,882	+5.3%
1911	130,415	+5.3%
1921	132,599	+1.7%
1931	134,825	+1.7%
1941	138,276	+2.6%
1951	141,817	+2.6%
1961	157,142	+10.8%
1971	174,165	+10.8%
1981	175,459	+0.7%
1991	179,168	+2.1%
2001	180,612	+0.8%
2011	185,060	+2.5%
2021	193,846	+4.7%
Source: "Bury District: total population". Vision of Britain. Source 2: "Bury (Metropolitan Borough, United Kingdom) with population statistics, charts, map and location".

The historical population table details the population change since 1801, including the percentage change since the last available census data. Although the Metropolitan Borough of Bury has only existed since 1974, figures have been generated by combining data from the towns, villages, and civil parishes that would later be constituent parts of the borough.

In 1971 34,980 people living in Bury were employed in manufacturing. By 2001 this had fallen to 13,690 – a decrease of 61%. During the same period the numbers of people employed in service industries increased from 34,200 to 54,227, a gain of 58.5%.

=== Religion ===
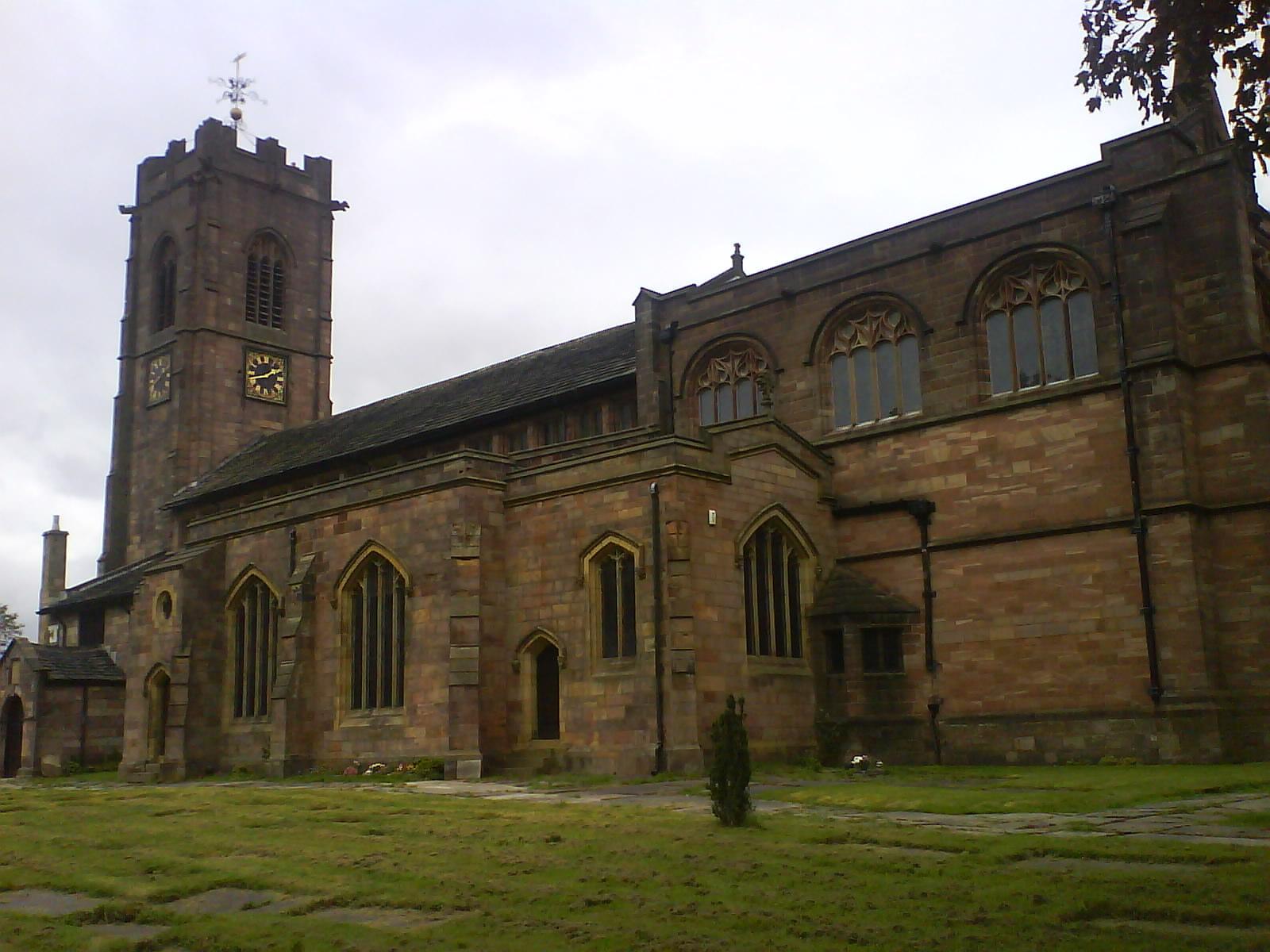
Parish Church of St. Mary the Virgin, Prestwich

At the 2021 UK census, 48.8% of people in Bury stated they were Christian. 29.4% of people stated they had no religion, 9.9% following the Muslim and 5.5% the Jewish faiths. The Jewish community in Prestwich and Whitefield is the second largest in the country.

Religion (2021 Census)	Population	% of total
Christian	94,669	48.8%
No religion	57,008	29.4%
Muslim	19,243	9.9%
Jewish	10,734	5.5%
Not answered	9,591	4.9%
Hindu	874	0.5%
Any other religion	649	0.3%
Sikh	575	0.3%
Buddhist	508	0.3%
Total	193,846	

Bury is covered by the Roman Catholic Diocese of Salford, and the Anglican Diocese of Manchester.

There are four Grade I listed churches in Bury. The Church of All Saints, at Stand in Whitefield, was built in 1826. The Parish Church of St Mary, Radcliffe, is a 14th-century church with a 15th-century tower. The Church of St Mary the Virgin, Prestwich, is a 15th-century church. The current Church of St Mary the Virgin, Bury, was built in 1876 by J. S. Crowther. Of the nine Grade II* listed buildings in Bury, two are churches: Christ Church, Walshaw and the Presbyterian Chapel in Ainsworth.

There are around SIX Mosques in Bury, including one of the oldest Islamic seminaries in the United Kingdom, Darul Uloom Bury, which was established in 1979 in Holcombe.

The original Jewish immigrant community in Manchester was based in the inner city. As in other cities the community gradually moved outward geographically and upward economically from its roots establishing itself in the more leafy suburbs of Crumpsall and Broughton Park as well as the town of Prestwich. Later, a second migration of young families in the mid-1960s sought pastures even further away from these traditional areas settling in Whitefield, Sunny Bank and Unsworth. There are now about 10 synagogues in the borough.

== Politics and services ==
Between 1974 and 1986, the Conservative Party controlled the council. In 1986, the Labour Party gained control and continued in power, at first with an overall Labour majority and subsequently through a Labour executive running the council in a state of no overall control, until 2007. The May elections in 2007 saw the Conservative Party become the largest group on the council and the Conservative Group took control of the council and its executive. The leader of the council was named as Councillor Bob Bibby. At the 2008 local elections, the Conservatives won three more seats and took overall control of the council. In 2010, the Conservatives lost overall control with the new council having 23 Conservative, 20 Labour and 8 Liberal Democrat councillors.

The Audit Commission reported in 2006 that Bury Council continues to make good and sustained progress in improving services for local people. Overall the council was awarded 'three star' status, similar to 47% of all local authorities.

The council was said to be improving well in children's services, particularly in social care. The Audit Commission also noted that resident satisfaction was rising, reflecting improvements in the quality of the environment and services generally. Ten parks have achieved green flag status, recycling levels are above average and street cleanliness is improving. The council is on target to reach its Decent Homes target by 2010.

The assessment concluded that the council has improved the way it uses its resources to deliver its plans, improving how it manages its finances and service performance and strengthening arrangements to make sure that it achieves good value for money.

== Education ==
There are 60 primary schools, 13 secondary schools, three special schools and two pupil referral units in the borough. Overall, Bury was ranked 23rd of the all local education authorities in SATs performance and 3rd in Greater Manchester in 2006. In 2007, Bury LEA was ranked 45th out of 148 in the country – and third in Greater Manchester – based on the percentage of pupils attaining at least five A*-C grades at GCSE including maths and English (47.8% compared with the national average of 45.8%). The schools of the area compete annually in the Bury Schools Athletics Championships.

The borough has two colleges of further education. Bury College, which was originally Bury Technical College. In 1974, it merged with Radcliffe Technical College to form the Bury Metropolitan College of Further Education and, in 1987, it was renamed Bury College following its merger with Peel Sixth Form College, Stand Sixth Form College and a number of Youth Training Schemes. Holy Cross College was formerly Bury Convent Grammar School. It was a direct grant Catholic girls' school founded in 1878 by the Daughters of the Cross, a congregation of religious from Liège. In 2007 it was named 7th in the country.

Bury is also home to one of the UK's oldest Islamic seminaries, Darul Uloom Bury, which was established in 1979 and located in Holcombe.

== Landmarks ==
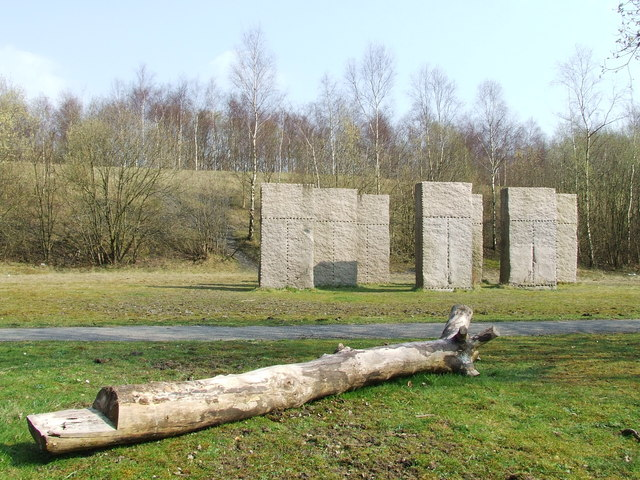
Ruckriem's "Standing Stones" sculpture at Outwood

As of February 2004, Bury has five Grade I, eight Grade II*, and 228 Grade II listed buildings.

Bury is at the heart of the largest public art scheme in the UK – the Irwell Sculpture Trail. Works in the borough include Ulrich Ruckriem's sculpture in Radcliffe, on the site of the former Outwood Colliery. Ruckreim is one of Germany's most eminent artists, best known for his monumental stone sculptures. His work at Outwood is one of his largest stone settings to date. Edward Allington's Tilted Vase sits in Market Place in the centre of Ramsbottom and has become a distinctive feature of interest.

== Local Nature Reserves ==
There are six local nature reserves (LNRs) in the borough:

- Chapelfield LNR, a Grade B Site of Biological Importance (SBI) with notable Water Violet Hottonia palustris.
- Chesham Woods LNR, a group of six woodlands and grazing meadows, established as the borough's second LNR in 2000
- Hollins Vale LNR, encompassing two Sites of Biological Importance: an area of grasslands which with historic hedgerows which Hollins Brook runs through; and woodland plantation.
- Kirklees Valley LNR, through which the Kirklees Trail passes.
- Philips Park LNR within the long-established Philips Park, the first and largest LNR in the borough, created in 1999, with a range of habitats, a countryside centre and a mountain bike trail.
- Redisher LNR, also called Redisher Wood LNR, a woodland valley around Holcombe Brook

== Twin towns ==
The Metropolitan Borough of Bury has five twin towns, in China, France, Germany and the United States. Two of these were originally twinned with a place within the Metropolitan Borough prior to its creation in 1974.

Country	Place	County / District / Region / State	Originally twinned with	Date	Notes
China	Datong	Shanxi	Metropolitan Borough of Bury	2003	
France	Angoulême	Poitou-Charentes	County Borough of Bury	1959	After which the 'Angoulême Retail Park' and the road 'Angoulême Way' are named.
France	Tulle	Limousin	Municipal Borough of Prestwich	1969	
Germany	Schorndorf	Baden-Württemberg	Metropolitan Borough of Bury	1994	
United States	Woodbury	New Jersey	Metropolitan Borough of Bury	2000	

== Freedom of the Borough ==
The following individuals and groups have received the Freedom of the Borough of Bury.

Name	Date Granted
Danny Boyle	11 May 2009
Zoe Robinson	11 May 2009
Members of the Band Elbow (Guy Garvey, Craig Potter, Mark Potter, Peter Turner, and Richard Jupp)	11 May 2009
* 207 (Manchester) Field Hospital Royal Army Medical Corps	20 October 2017
Kieran Trippier	14 July 2018
Henry Donn	4 April 2022
Roy Walker	15 December 2022

== See also ==
- Bury local elections
- List of people from Bury
