= Clayton Vale =

Area of green space in Manchester, England

Coordinates: 53°29′29″N 2°10′34″W

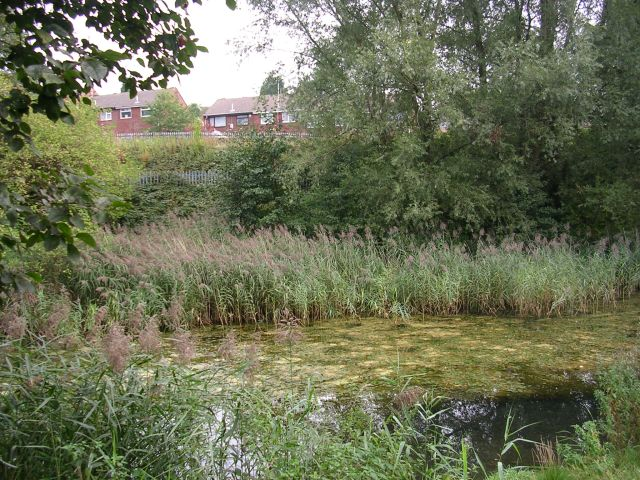
A pond in woodland at Clayton Vale

Clayton Vale is an area of green space in Clayton, Manchester, England, through which the River Medlock flows. Redeveloped in 1986, the land has a rich industrial and social history. Today the area is a natural habitat for wildlife and it has been designated a Local Nature Reserve.

== Natural history ==
Fossils of plants and insects in the rocks of the area show a very different climate to what we see today. Swamp forests and luxuriant growth were encouraged by the warm moist air. At the start of the Triassic Period, Britain was largely covered by desert. The land sank producing a great salt lake over much of northern Britain, after which the desert conditions returned.

== Clayton Vale pre-1986 ==
The Vale landscape was somewhat different before the late 1970s. The valley was home to many buildings from Bank Bridge Works and Tannery to The Smallpox Hospital.

Bank Bridge Works and Tannery

The chimney behind the Jewish Cemetery of Philips Park is all that remains of the once extensive complex, which was once shown on Johnson's Map of 1820.

The Smallpox Hospital

When the Manchester Ship Canal opened, and the city became an inland port, an isolation hospital was required to nurse sailors with infectious diseases. Originally known as Clayton Infectious Diseases Hospital, it was shown on the Ordnance Survey map of 1909. By 1933, it became known as Clayton Smallpox Hospital.

On the north bank of the River Medlock, opposite the site of the print works, the foundation stone is clearly visible along with brick walling on top of the stonework. To the south of the river stood the nurses home, known as Clayton House. The site also contained other associated buildings.

The Old Print Works

Standing near Clayton Bridge, on the sharp bend of the river on the south bank was Clayton Vale Print Works. This was shown again on Johnson's Map of 1820, but by 1888 the OS map shows the works as being disused and in 1909 the ten buildings of the complex were demolished leaving little to be seen today. However, foundation stone can be seen in the river bed.

Culcheth Dye Works

Shown on the 1893 OS map as a collection of buildings with large reservoirs. Because the more modern dye works made a greater demand on the water supply than could be provided by the river, the industry, known as Failsworth Dyeing and Finishing Works, fell into disuse in the late 1960s. The site has since been landscaped. The works once stood next to the present day Visitors Centre.

River Maintenance and Notable Bridges in the Vale

A bridge, situated where Edge Lane meets Berry Brow, is mentioned as far back as 1696. Today, a stone bridge stands, known as Clayton Bridge. Before this there was a ford, suggesting an ancient river crossing which might have been used since prehistoric times.

In 1872, the River Medlock rose suddenly and tore away part of the printworks complex, as well as washing away between 40 and 50 bodies from Philips Park Cemetery. After this, the river was lined with red bricks to prevent such a disaster from happening again. It is because of the red brick lining that the river is sometimes called 'The Red River'. This type of river engineering can be seen from the bridge nearby.

In recent years, more river engineering has taken place further up the river bank, near the red brick bridge (known as Vale Street Bridge). The river course was changed in the early 1960s as steep stone walls were installed to prevent flooding.

Coates Farm

Coates Farm held a summer gala for local children before the First World War, with races, tea and lemonade. The stone wall next to the river is probably one of the remaining walls of the farmhouse.

Edge Lane, Millstream Lane and Berry Brow is known locally as Pop Brew and the vale was also known locally as "the meddie". Coates farm was cleared by 1960 and a road was made taking Dustbin waste carts to a landfill site along the valley. The pig sty for the farm was demolished during World War Two and in its place stood an ARP Warden hut. a new build visitor centre now stands near the site of the old farm. Manchester Central Library online photo archive is a source, and can be accessed via a link below.

The Bay Horse Inn and Clayton Bridge as a Hamlet

Originally a farm building, it became a pub in the 19th century - known then as The Grey Mare. The inn served the small hamlet of Clayton Bridge which sprang up in the 18th and 19th centuries as a result of the dye and print works. It was home to many dwellings, including Andrews Brew - once a small lane off Berry Brow, it housed thatched roof cottages which were pulled down in the early 1990s. Saint Cuthbert Church was also erected around this time, but has since been demolished.

Other Victorian terraced houses lined the west side of Berry Brow as it rose to the level crossing at Clayton Bridge railway station, the east side still being occupied by fields into the 1950s.

Clayton Bridge Railway Station

Clayton Bridge railway station on the line between Manchester and Stalybridge opened in April 1846 and became a victim of the Beeching Axe, closing in 1968. The station buildings were to the west of Berry Brow, the signal box was on the opposite side on the north of the line and was also used to manually operate the level crossing gates. Nothing remains of the station.

Railway branch line

In 1904, a railway branch line was completed which ran south through Clayton Vale to the Stuart Street Power Station. The line was later extended in 1916, across Ashton New Road into the Clayton Aniline Company works. For many years, waste coal ash from the power station was transported on the line and dumped as landfill into Clayton Vale.

== Clayton Vale post 1986 ==
Before the mid-nineteen eighties, the land was heavily polluted with recent landfills and general neglect, and the buildings of the vale had either been vandalised or demolished. Redevelopment of the land went under way, known as the Medlock Valley Scheme. The area has been described as a shining example of urban country parkland and a haven for wildlife by The Heritage Trail. Trees were planted in the mid-1980s and after two decades stands a semi-mature forest, home to black-and-white blackbirds and squirrels in the taller trees. Silver birch, ash, sycamore, willow and poplars line to the top of the dell.

== See also ==
- Clayton, Manchester
- Newton Heath
