= Bradford-with-Beswick =

Inner city area in Manchester, England

Coordinates: 53°29′N 2°13′W

Manchester parish map with Beswick in the center, abbreviated Bk

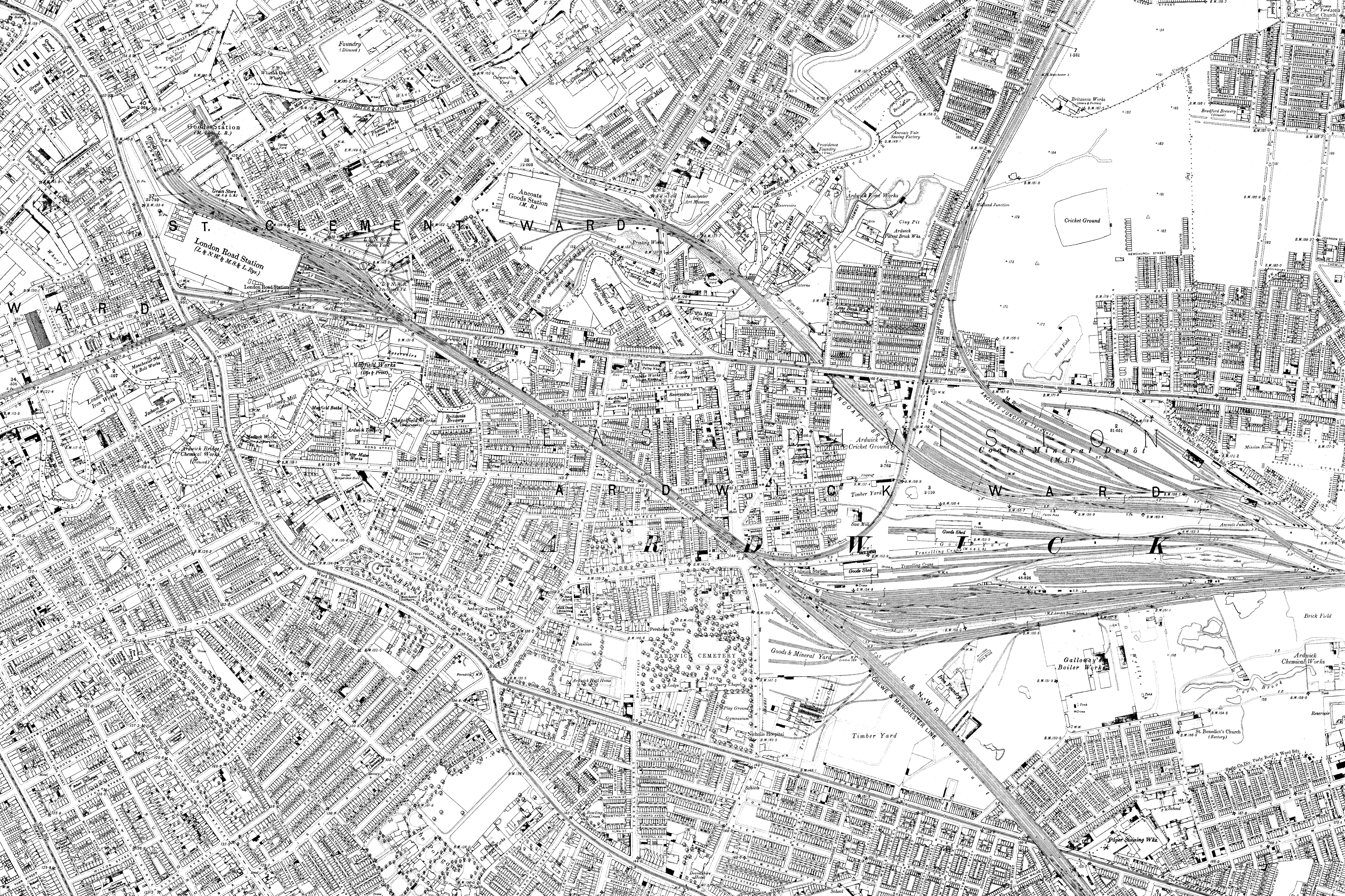
An early 20th-century Ordnance Survey map of Manchester

Beswick is an inner city area in Manchester, England. It consists of the ancient township of Beswick, Manchester, which is in the ancient parish of Manchester and hundred of Salford.

== Bradford-with-Beswick ==
The name Bradford-with-Beswick appears to have been coined by Christ Church, the 19th-century church that served the communities of those growing villages to the east of Manchester. Christ Church lay on the corner of Church Street and Cowper Street, on the boundary between the two villages, and it seems reasonable that the church authorities should use this name to describe them.

Christ Church, Bradford, was built in 1862 in the Early English style; the benefice was a rectory and its parish included Bradford and parts of Beswick and Openshaw.

== Bradford village ==
For administrative purposes, Bradford village was originally part of the Salford Hundred in the County Palatine of Lancaster. It is bordered by Miles Platting to the north and the River Medlock and the Ashton Canal both run through it. The village name is ancient and in 1196 it was known as Bradeford, meaning "broad ford". Until the Industrial Revolution, Bradford Village was rural with woodland, pastures and streams. It is reported that wolves and eagles once inhabited the woodlands and that honey production was part of the local economy.

Bradford Village also formed part of the Parish of Manchester but it was still an independent township having its own parochial offices under the Manchester churchwardens. In 1841 all this changed and the township became a member of the Manchester Union of Poor Law Guardians, which was established under the Poor Law Amendment Act 1841. From the 13 April 1850, until its incorporation into the township of North Manchester in 1896, the village was a member of the Prestwich Union, constituted by order of the Poor Law Board in 1850. The Local Board was set up in 1863, under the Public Health Act 1848.

Since the days of the Tudors (1485–1603), sufficient coal was mined at the village to supply most of the needs of Manchester but with the onset of the Industrial Revolution Bradford Colliery, as it was then known, was rapidly expanded to provide fuel to power steam engines in the new cotton mills that were springing up in the district. With the coming of the Ashton Canal in 1797, the colliery was connected to it by means of a private branch.

This canal branch also served the other large employer in Bradford Village, Richard Johnson & Nephew (Bradford Ironworks), who manufactured wire of all kinds.

In 1871, the owner of Bradford Colliery was R. T. Parker and the occupier, for rate purposes, was T.& C. Livesey. When deeper pit shafts were sunk, seams of fireclay were discovered and consequently a brickworks was built on the north side of the site to manufacture firebricks for use in lining furnaces. The brickworks had the same owner and occupier as Bradford Colliery. By 1896, the pit manager was H.L. Ward and the under-manager was George Bentley. At that time there were 404 underground workers and 125 surface workers. Four types of coal were mined: gas coal, household coal, manufacturing coal and steam coal. The brickworks was still operational in 1896 but by this time it was owned by Edward Williams. However, the only employees were three underground workers still extracting clay and two surface workers and this indicates a decline in the local firebrick manufacturing industry. Bradford Colliery remained open until September 1968 when it closed; not because its supply of coal was exhausted, but because of the subsidence that would have been caused by the exploitation of new coal seams.

In 1869, a giant gasholder or gasometer was built at the new Bradford Gas Works and this, along with the adjacent colliery, ironworks and cotton mills, was a dominant feature of the landscape.

== Beswick village ==
Beswick village is also ancient and around 1200–30 it was known as Bexwic, believed to be a combination of a personal name and a settlement or dwelling place. The River Medlock and the Ashton Canal both run through it.

Beswick village was originally smaller than Bradford village and it became part of the township of Manchester in 1838, being joined with Ardwick to form a municipal ward in the new township. For poor law purposes it was added to the Prestwich Poor Law Union, which was constituted by order of the Poor Law Board in 1850. In 1896 it was among the townships consolidated to form the township of North Manchester for Poor Law purposes.

At the height of the Industrial Revolution there was less industry here than in Bradford village and consequently back-to-back terraced houses abounded everywhere. Two open spaces were the David Lewis Play Ground and Bradford Recreation Ground.

== Philips Park and Philips Park Cemetery ==
Philips Park is on the south side of the River Medlock, and Philips Park Cemetery is on the north side.

The park has the distinction of being Manchester's original public park and Mark Philips, who was the Member of Parliament for Manchester, opened it in 1846. It was the first of its kind in Britain and it set the standard for many others that soon followed in towns and cities throughout Britain. It was designed to have walks, expansive lakes and glasshouses for exotic plants. It is also famous for its annual Tulip Festival, which is still held every year.

Philips Park Cemetery was opened in 1863.
