= Bradford, Manchester =

Area of Manchester, England

Coordinates: 53.4803°N 2.1952°W

Bradford
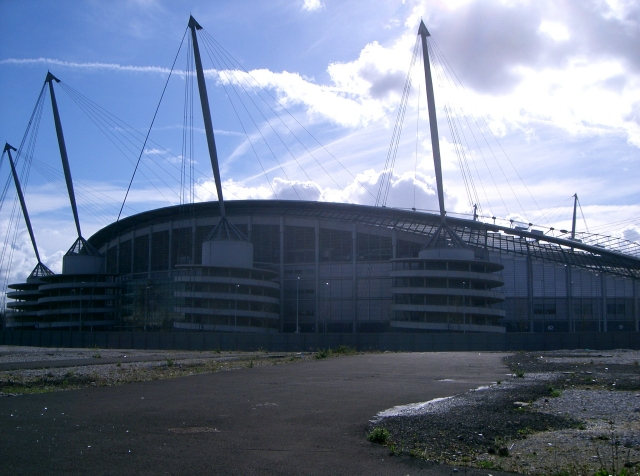
- City of Manchester Stadium, Bradford

- Location within Greater Manchester
- Population: 15,784 (2011)
- Ward Established: 2004
- Ward Abolished: 2018
- OS grid reference: SJ8714298193
- Metropolitan borough: Manchester
- Metropolitan county: Greater Manchester
- Region: North West
- Country: England
- Sovereign state: United Kingdom
- Post town: MANCHESTER
- Postcode district: M11
- Dialling code: 0161
- Police: Greater Manchester
- Fire: Greater Manchester
- Ambulance: North West
- UK Parliament: Manchester Central

Bradford is a district of east Manchester, England, two miles north east of the city centre. The population at the 2011 census was 15,784. Historically in Lancashire, after the closure of its heavy industries Bradford was for many years an economically deprived area but has undergone regeneration with the building of the City of Manchester Stadium which hosted the 2002 Commonwealth Games and is now home to Manchester City F.C. Bradford is neighboured by Beswick to the south and the two areas are sometimes referred to as Bradford-with-Beswick. The River Medlock and the Ashton Canal run through Bradford.

== History ==
The name of the area is ancient and in 1196 the village was recorded as Bradeford, meaning the broad ford. Up to the Industrial Revolution, it was rural with woodland, pastures and brooks. Wolves and eagles once inhabited the woodlands and honey production was part of the local economy.

=== Coal mining ===
From Tudor times (1485–1603), sufficient coal was mined to supply most of the needs of Manchester and with the onset of the Industrial Revolution, Bradford Colliery provided fuel to power steam engines in the new cotton mills that were springing up in the district. With the coming of the Ashton Canal in 1797, the colliery was connected to it by means of a private branch.

In 1871, the owner of Bradford Colliery was R. T. Parker and the occupier, for rate purposes, was T. & C. Livesey. When deeper pit shafts were sunk, seams of fireclay were discovered and consequently a brickworks was built on the north side of the colliery site to manufacture firebricks for use in lining furnaces. In 1896, the pit manager was F. L. Ward and the under-manager was George Bentley. At that time there were 404 underground workers and 125 surface workers. Coal were mined for making gas, for household and manufacturing use and for raising steam. The brickworks was operational in 1896 owned by Edward Williams. It employed three underground workers extracting clay and two surface workers. In 1935 Bradford Colliery became part of Manchester Collieries and became part of the National Coal Board on nationalisation in 1947. It remained open until September 1968 when it closed, not because its supply of coal was exhausted, but because of the damage to property caused by subsidence that would have been caused in the exploitation of new coal seams under built-up areas.

Coal from the mine was fed to the nearby Stuart Street Power Station via an underground conveyor system.

=== Other industries ===
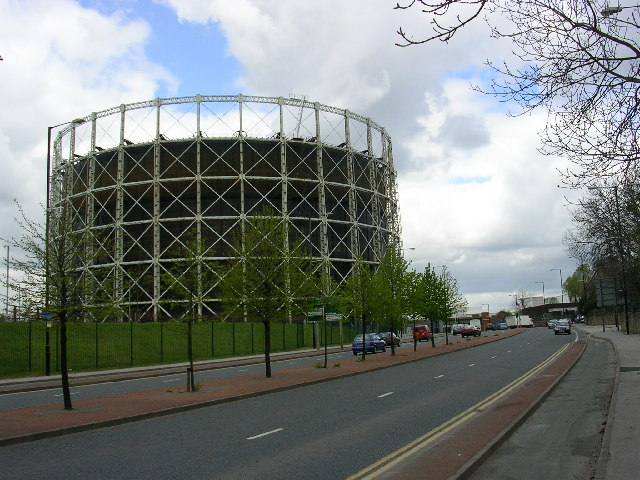
Gasholder in Bradford, Manchester

The other large employer in Bradford was Richard Johnson & Nephew (Bradford Ironworks), manufacturers of wire of all kinds. The ironworks was close to the Ashton Canal. In 1869, a gasometer was built at the new Bradford Gasworks and this, along with the adjacent colliery, ironworks and cotton mills, was a dominant feature of the landscape.

== Governance ==
Bradford was originally a part of the Salford hundred in the County Palatine of Lancashire. Bradford was an independent township of the ancient parish of Manchester, having its own parochial offices under the Manchester churchwardens. In 1841 this changed and the township became a member of the Manchester Poor Law Union, which was established under the Poor Law Amendment Act 1841. From 13 April 1850 the village was a member of the Prestwich Union, constituted by order of the Poor Law Board in 1850. The local board was set up in 1863 under the Public Health Act 1848. In 1866 Bradford became a separate civil parish, on 26 March 1896 the parish was abolished to form North Manchester. In 1891 the parish had a population of 19,981.

Under boundary changes by the Local Government Boundary Commission for England (LGBCE) the ward was abolished and replaced with the new electoral wards Ancoats and Beswick and Clayton and Openshaw in May 2018.

Election	Councillor	Councillor	Councillor
2004	John Longsden (Lab)	John Smith (Lab)	Neil Swannick (Lab)
2006	John Longsden (Lab)	John Smith (Lab)	Neil Swannick (Lab)
2007	John Longsden (Lab)	Rosa Battle (Lab)	Neil Swannick (Lab)
2008	John Longsden (Lab)	Rosa Battle (Lab)	Neil Swannick (Lab)
2010	John Longsden (Lab)	Rosa Battle (Lab)	Neil Swannick (Lab)
2011	John Longsden (Lab)	Rosa Battle (Lab)	Neil Swannick (Lab)
2012	John Longsden (Lab)	Rosa Battle (Lab)	Neil Swannick (Lab)
2014	John Longsden (Lab)	Rosa Battle (Lab)	Neil Swannick (Lab)
2015	John Longsden (Lab)	Rosa Battle (Lab)	Neil Swannick (Lab)
2016	John Longsden (Lab)	Rosa Battle (Lab)	Emma Taylor (Lab)
2018	Ward abolished	Ward abolished	Ward abolished

indicates seat up for re-election. indicates ward abolished and replaced with new wards: Ancoats & Beswick and Clayton & Openshaw.

== Geography ==
The Bradford township had an area of 288 acres between the River Medlock and Ashton Old Road. During the Industrial Revolution the area was covered with streets of terraced houses. The Ashton Canal crosses the township to the north and beyond the canal is Philips Park. the underlying rocks are the sandstones and shales of the Middle Coal Measures of the Manchester Coalfield.

== Regeneration ==
In addition to the City of Manchester Stadium and National Cycling Centre velodrome, Asda built its then largest store in the UK here, an Asda Supercentre, which opened in June 2002.

Bradford was home to the sculpture B of the Bang, built to commemorate the 2002 Commonwealth Games. At the time it was the tallest artwork in the UK, but after suffering structural problems was dismantled in 2009.
