= Park railway station =

Former railway station in Manchester, England

Park
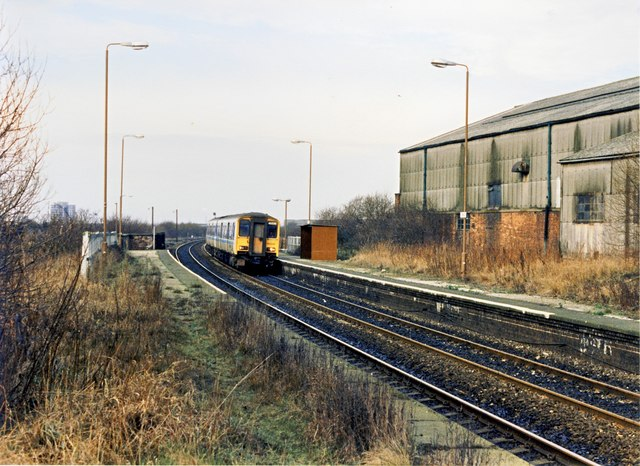
- Park railway station in 1989

General information
- Location: Newton Heath, Philips Park, City of Manchester; England
- Coordinates: 53.493°N 2.195°W
- Platforms: 2

Other information
- Status: Disused

History
- Original company: Ashton, Stalybridge and Liverpool Junction Railway
- Pre-grouping: Lancashire and Yorkshire Railway
- Post-grouping: London, Midland and Scottish Railway

Key dates
- 13 April 1846: Opened
- 27 May 1995: Closed
Location

Park railway station served the Newton Heath and Philips Park areas of Manchester, England.

== Location and early history ==
The station was located on Briscoe Lane. The station was opened on 13 April 1846 by the Ashton, Stalybridge and Liverpool Junction Railway (AS&LJ) at the same time as their line from Miles Platting to Ashton-under-Lyne and Stalybridge.

The AS&LJ became part of the Lancashire and Yorkshire Railway on 9 July 1847. The London and North Western Railway had running powers over the line, and from the completion of Standedge Tunnel ran express trains between Leeds and Manchester through Park station.

The station was served by local trains between Huddersfield, Stalybridge and Manchester throughout its life, although from 1968 (when many other local stations in the area closed) these mainly called during the weekday peaks.

== Later history and closure ==
Latterly only a handful of trains served the station and usage had declined to the point where it was decided that it was no longer economically viable to keep it open—as a result it closed on 27 May 1995. The overgrown platforms are still visible from passing trains.

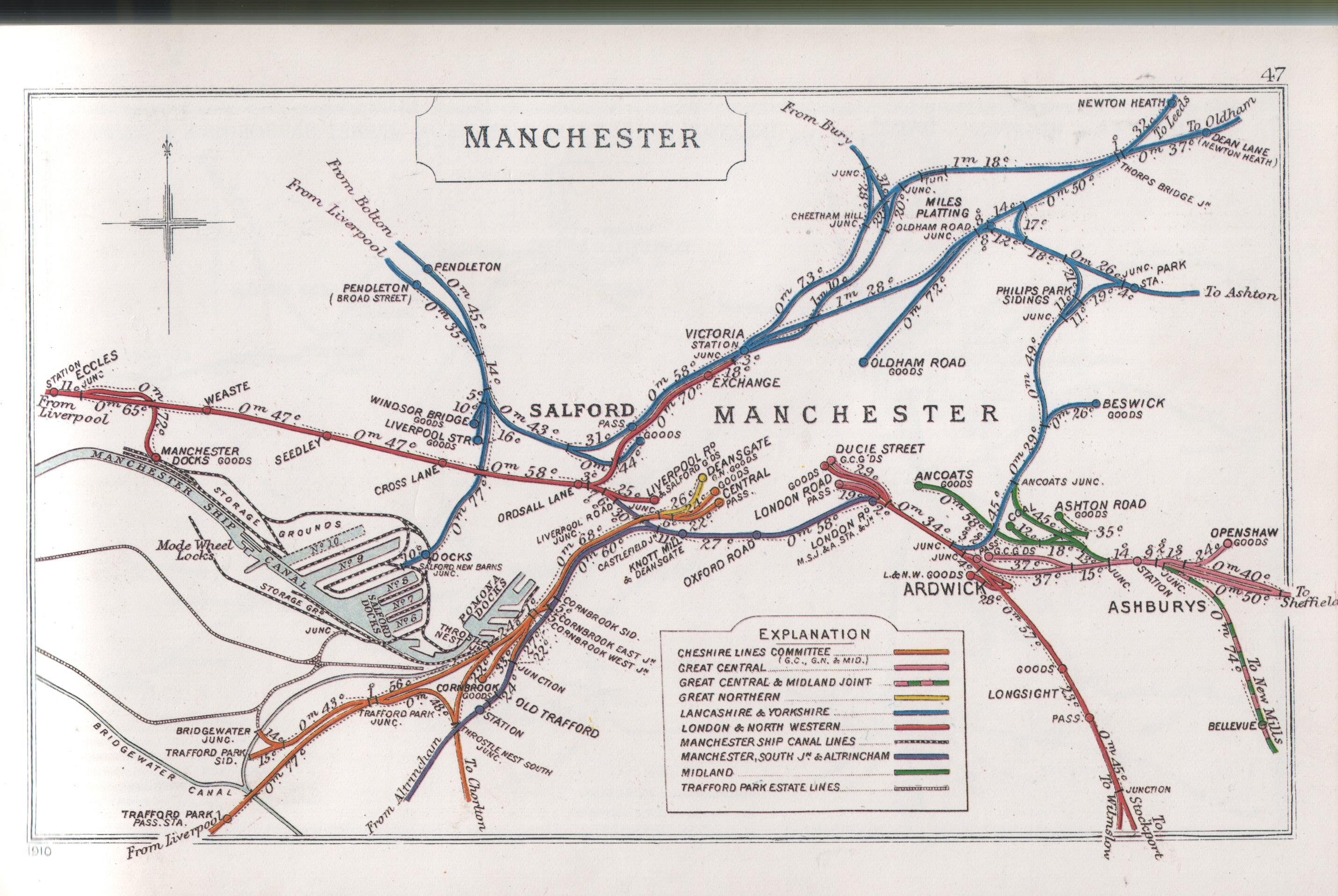
1910 Railway Clearing House diagram of Manchester's railway system showing the location (upper right) of Park station on the LYR line to Ashton

Preceding station	Disused railways	Following station
Miles Platting	L&YR; Huddersfield Line	Clayton Bridge
