= Ashton, Stalybridge and Liverpool Junction Railway =

The Ashton, Stalybridge and Liverpool Junction Railway (AS&LJR) was opened in 1846 to connect the industrial town of Ashton-under-Lyne to the developing railway network, and in particular to the port of Liverpool. It was a short line, joining the Manchester and Leeds Railway at Miles Platting (east of Manchester) and the connection to Liverpool was over that line and the Liverpool and Manchester Railway.

A branch line to Ardwick, near the present-day Manchester Piccadilly station, was built giving passenger and freight connection to the West Midlands and southern England.

The AS&LJR was closely aligned to the Manchester and Leeds Railway, and in 1847 the two companies amalgamated, along with another line still under construction, and the combined company was named the Lancashire and Yorkshire Railway. The Ardwick branch was not opened until after the amalgamation.

When the London and North Western Railway developed a route to Leeds via Huddersfield, its trains used the AS&LJR line from Manchester to Stalybridge, so that the S&LJR formed part of an important main line. Most of the small network remains in use at the present day.

== Conception ==
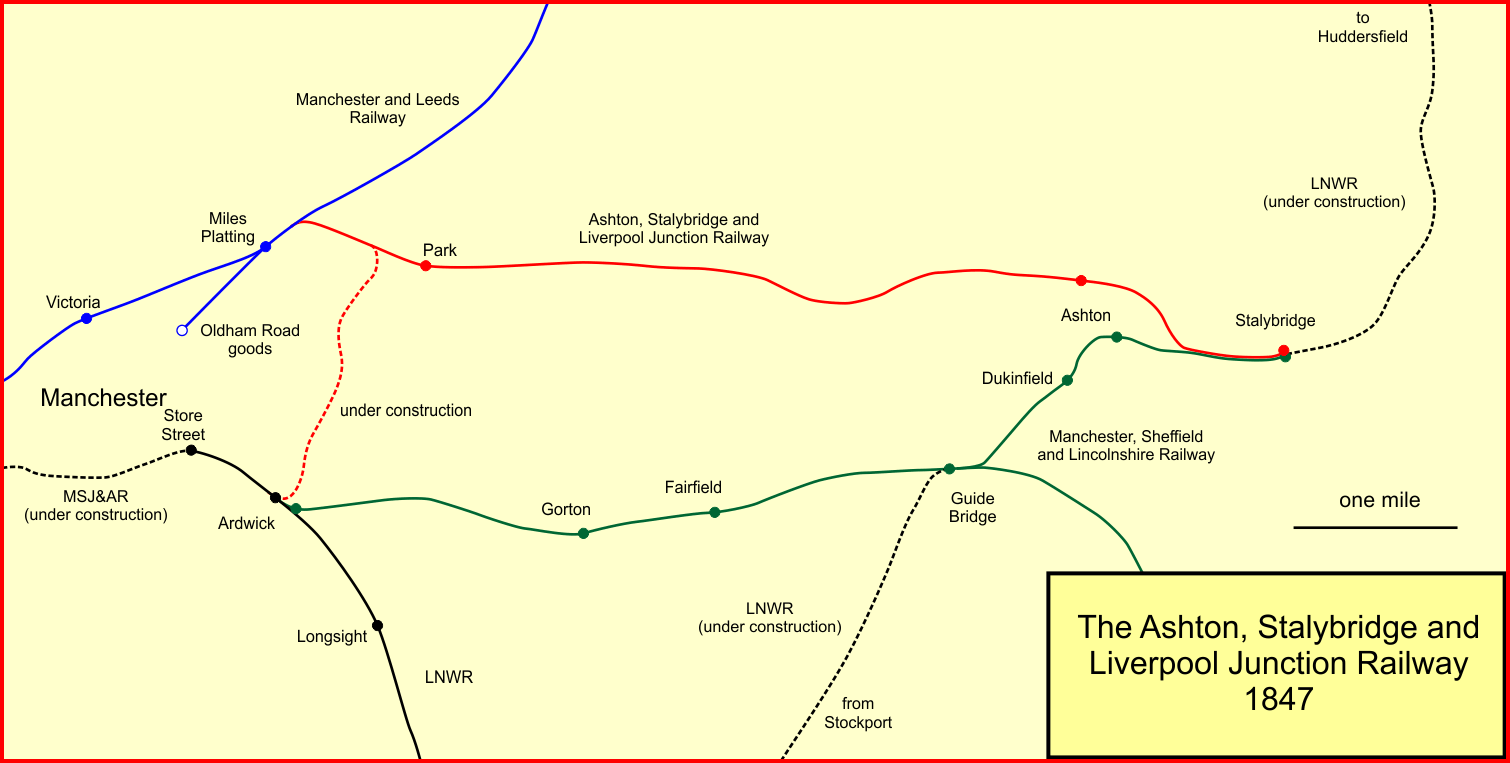
The Ashton, Stalybridge and Liverpool Junction Railway in mid-1847

As the Manchester and Leeds Railway established itself, its directors began to think of what branches could be built profitably. Thomas Longridge Gooch, its engineer, was instructed to survey suitable branches in 1843. One of these was from Miles Platting to Ashton and Stalybridge, with a short branch to Ardwick. At the time Ashton had a population of 40,000, and its manufacturing industry relied on the nearest station at Guide Bridge, 2 miles (3 km) away, on the Sheffield, Ashton-under-Lyne and Manchester Railway, and goods to and from Liverpool – a most important port for the town's raw materials – had to be carted by road across Manchester at the time.

Ashton, Stalybridge and Liverpool Junction Railway Act 1844
- Act of Parliament
- Parliament of the United Kingdom
- Long title: An Act for making a Railway from the Manchester and Leeds Railway to the Towns of Ashton-under-Lyne and Staly Bridge.
- Citation: 7 & 8 Vict. c. lxxxii

Dates
- Royal assent: 19 July 1844

Text of statute as originally enacted

Gooch's survey showed that a line was feasible, and construction was authorised by the Ashton, Stalybridge and Liverpool Junction Railway Act 1844 (7 & 8 Vict. c. lxxxii) of 19 July 1844. The Manchester and Leeds Railway (M&LR) was permitted by the act of Parliament to purchase or lease the AS&LJR. The reference to Liverpool was to the new connection over the M&LR to the Liverpool and Manchester Railway; there was no intention to build to Liverpool. A Stalybridge branch of the Sheffield, Ashton and Manchester Railway (SA&MR) was authorised on the same day. (The SA&MR later was reorganised as the Manchester, Sheffield and Lincolnshire Railway in 1847.) The two Stalybridge terminal stations were to be built alongside one another.

Ashton, Stalybridge and Liverpool Junction Railway Act 1845
- Act of Parliament
- Parliament of the United Kingdom
- Long title: An Act for amending the Act relating to the Ashton, Stalybridge, and Liverpool Junction Railway, and for making a Branch therefrom to Ardwick.
- Citation: 8 & 9 Vict. c. cix

Dates
- Royal assent: 21 July 1845

The Ashton, Stalybridge and Liverpool Junction Railway Act 1845 (8 & 9 Vict. c. cix), on 21 July 1845, authorised the branch from Miles Platting to Ardwick, connecting there with the Manchester and Birmingham Railway (later to become the London and North Western Railway), facing towards Store Street (later London Road) station.

== Construction and opening ==
The main line was built in two sections, by Hemingway & Pearson and Harding & Cropper respectively. As well as a timber viaduct at Park, there was a viaduct over the River Medlock, comprising ten stone arches of 30 feet (9 m) span and with a total length of 400 feet (120 m). A deep cutting had to be made at Ashton Moss, and the bad ground conditions were exceptionally difficult. Where the railway crossed the moss land, the ground had to be excavated to a depth of 4 to 5 feet (1.2 to 1.5 m), filled up with layers of brushwood and clay, and afterwards ballasted. The rails there were laid on longitudinal timbers. At Miles Platting, a relocated station was built at the new junction. The line was to be 6 miles 793 yards (10.381 km) long; it was made as a single line but the works were all double-track width except for Medlock viaduct. Ashton station was a large commodious stone building with a roof over the railway 150 feet (46 m) long and with a span of 60 feet (18 m).

The line from Miles Platting to Ashton was inspected by General Pasley for the Board of Trade on 6 April 1846, and following his approval, it opened on 13 April: 1,100 passengers were carried on the first day. It was connected to the Manchester and Leeds Railway at Miles Platting, and through running to Liverpool over the Liverpool and Manchester Railway was possible. On 23 September Pasley inspected the remainder of the branch, and that was opened to Stalybridge on 5 October. The station at Stalybridge was a simple structure with one platform. On 8 June 1847 a contract for doubling the line was let to Gill & Child. The work progressed slowly and was completed, except for Medlock viaduct, by 1 March 1849, but approval for opening the second track was delayed until 1 August. In February 1849 the contract for widening the viaduct was let to Child & Barker, and completed towards the end of 1849. The widening consisted of an additional single track width on the north side.

== Ardwick branch ==
The Ardwick branch from Miles Platting was to be 1 mile 1,561 yards (3.037 km) long. Work was started in the summer of 1845 but progress was slow and hindered by the collapse of some of the arches of the Ardwick viaduct on 11 March 1848. A single line was opened throughout on 20 November 1848 for goods traffic only, and the line soon formed an important link from the Potteries and the south-west to Hull and the West Riding. Regular passenger trains began at the end of 1852; connections were arranged at Miles Platting and Ardwick for journeys from Rochdale and beyond to London. On 19 April 1865 the order was given for the branch to be doubled, and this second line was ready on 7 August.

== Formation of Lancashire and Yorkshire Railway ==
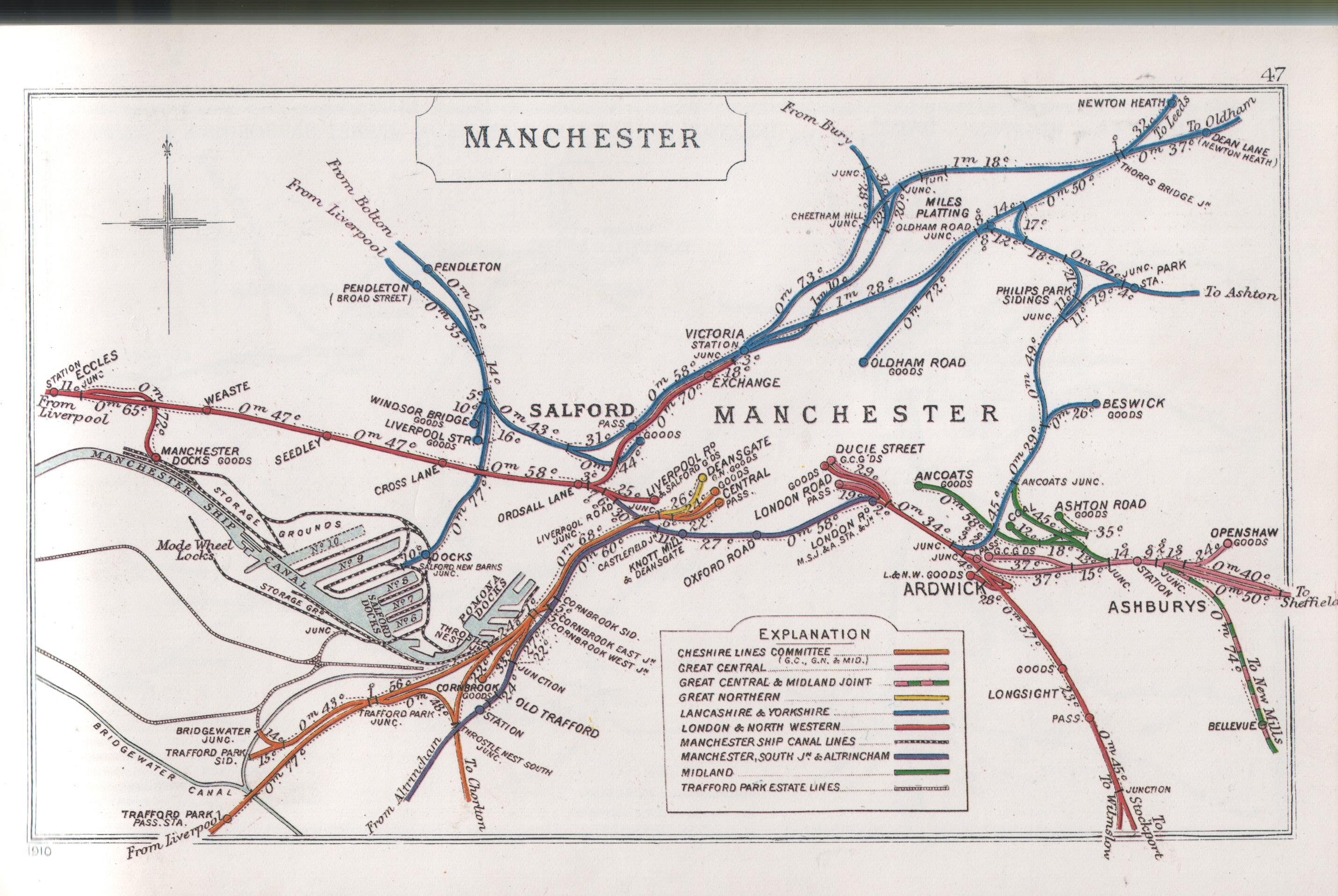

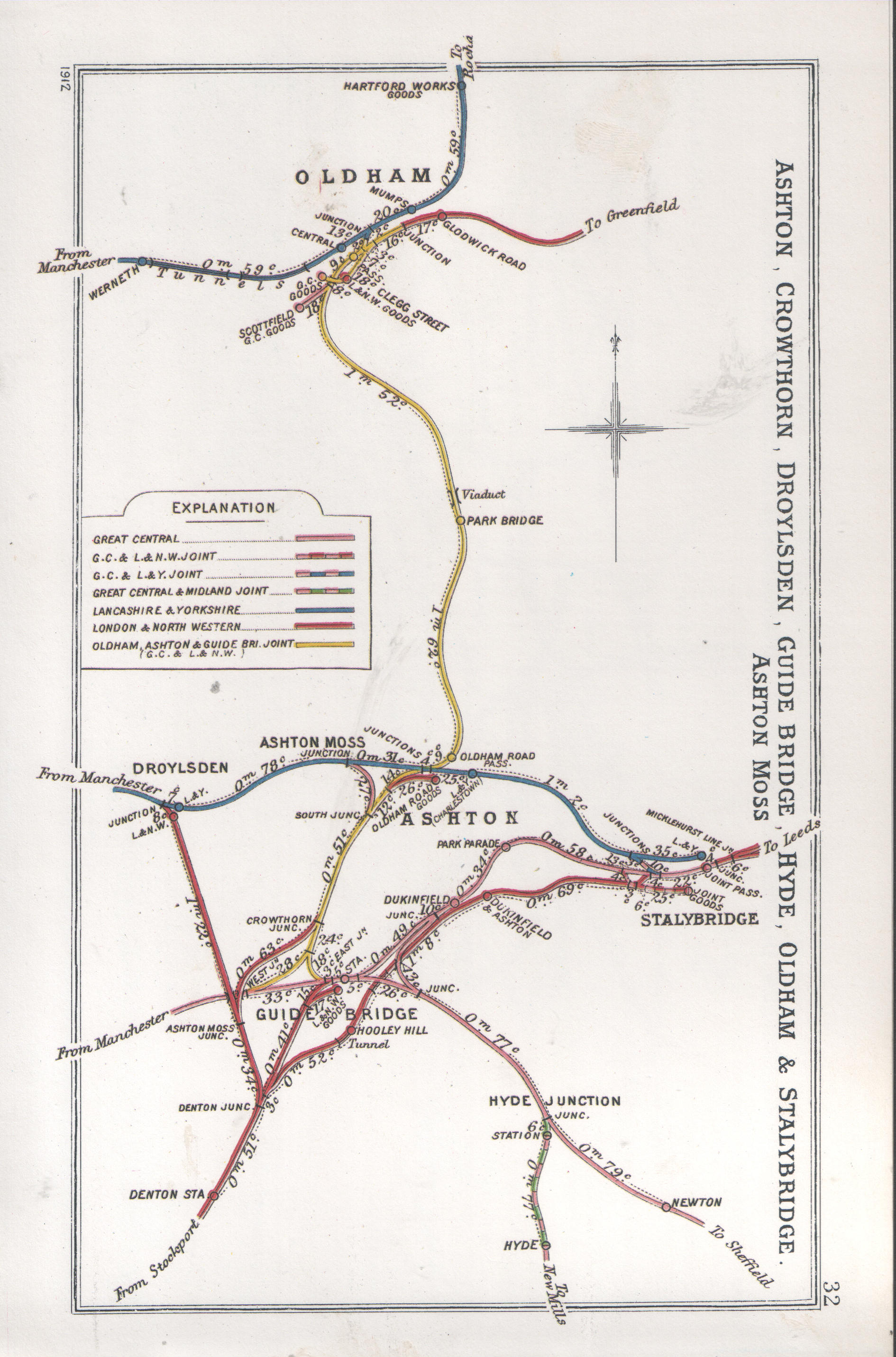

The Ashton, Stalybridge and Liverpool Junction Railway had always been closely aligned to the Manchester and Leeds Railway (M&LR), and in 1846 amalgamation was decided upon, also to include the authorised but unbuilt Wakefield, Pontefract and Goole Railway. The M&LR was vigorously extending its area of influence, and its original name was inappropriate, so as part of the amalgamation, a change of name was made: the combined company was to be the Lancashire and Yorkshire Railway. The amalgamation and the change of name were confirmed by the Manchester and Leeds Railway Act (No. 3) 1847 (10 & 11 Vict. c. clxiii) of 9 July 1847.

== Stalybridge to Huddersfield ==
Leeds, Dewsbury and Manchester Railway Act 1845
- Act of Parliament
- Parliament of the United Kingdom
- Long title: An Act for making a Railway from Leeds by Dewsbury to Huddersfield, all in the West Riding of the County of York, and for improving the Communication by Railway between the Towns of Leeds and Huddersfield and the Town of Manchester.
- Citation: 8 & 9 Vict. c. xxxvi

Dates
- Royal assent: 30 June 1845

The roundabout route of the Leeds and Manchester Railway, via Normanton, encouraged the development of shorter routes, and an independent Leeds, Dewsbury and Manchester Railway was incorporated by the Leeds, Dewsbury and Manchester Railway Act 1845 (8 & 9 Vict. c. xxxvi) of 30 June 1845 to build a line from Leeds to Cooper Bridge, near Mirfield on the Manchester and Leeds Railway.

The next month, on 21 July 1845, the Huddersfield and Manchester Railway and Canal Company was authorised by the Huddersfield and Manchester Railway and Canal Act 1845 (8 & 9 Vict. c. cv). This was a reorganisation of an existing canal of 1811. The new railway would run from near Cooper Bridge via Huddersfield to the Stalybridge station of the Sheffield, Ashton-under-Lyne and Manchester Railway. In 1847 the SA&MR too reorganised, and was renamed the Manchester, Sheffield and Lincolnshire Railway (MS&LR). Together the two new lines would form a new, shorter, route from Leeds to Manchester, reaching Manchester over the SA&MR line.

1845 was a peak year for railway authorisations: the Manchester and Birmingham Railway (M&BR) was authorised to build a branch from Heaton Norris, on its line just north of Stockport, to Guide Bridge on the Sheffield, Ashton-under-Lyne and Manchester Railway (SA&LJR). By the London and North Western Railway Act 1846 (9 & 10 Vict. c. cciv) of 6 July 1846 the Manchester and Birmingham Railway amalgamated with others to form the London and North Western Railway (LNWR).

The M&BR had long sought for a line to Leeds, and now (as the LNWR) this became possible. By the London and North Western Railway Act 1847 (10 & 11 Vict. c. clix) the London and North Western Railway gained possession of the Leeds, Dewsbury and Manchester Railway and the Huddersfield and Manchester Railway, which were both still under construction. When they were completed, the LNWR would have its own line from Stockport to Leeds; however it had no line of its own between Manchester and Stalybridge. The Huddersfield authorisation had indicated a connection to the SA&MR at Stalybridge, to reach Manchester via Guide Bridge, but the LNWR chose to make a connection to the Stalybridge, Ashton and Liverpool Junction line, now part of the Lancashire and Yorkshire Railway (L&YR).

On 1 August 1849 the Huddersfield to Stalybridge line and the connection to the L&YR were opened to traffic and from that date the LNWR began working trains between Manchester and Leeds, over the former SA&LJR line. The LNWR's Heaton Norris to Guide Bridge line opened on the same day. The MS&LR station at Stalybridge was now used for all passenger purposes, the former SA&LJR station being relegated to a goods station. On the same day the L&YR trains at Stalybridge were transferred from the former Manchester and Leeds Railway station to the MS&LR station. It was enlarged in 1858, but it was still very unsatisfactory. The L&YR trains continued to use it until 1 October 1869 when, because of dissatisfaction over the accommodation, they returned to their old station. That station then remained in use until 2 April 1917, and the L&YR relinquished its rights to use the joint station, which became the property of the MS&LR and the LNWR jointly. A new and improved station was brought into use on 21 May 1885.

== Later connections ==
A short goods branch to Beswick was opened on 6 March 1865 and carried general merchandise, as well as coal from a colliery near its terminus.

The Midland Railway (Additional Powers) Act 1885 (48 & 49 Vict. c. xc) of 16 July 1885 gave powers for the Ancoats Curve onto the L&YR Ardwick branch, from the Sheffield and Midland Railway Companies' Committee line. By an agreement dated 26 November 1884 the Midland Railway was granted running powers over the L&YR from Ancoats to Manchester Victoria and through to Hellifield, and from Liverpool Exchange to Blackburn. The Ancoats Curve was opened for ordinary passenger trains on 1 July 1889, permitting through running from London St Pancras to Manchester Victoria, and for the next 20 years many of the Manchester to Blackburn trains, including almost all fast passenger trains, were worked by the Midland Railway with through coaches from London St Pancras to Blackburn.

An east to south connection from the Stalybridge line towards Ardwick was brought into use on 21 September 1890; it was known as the Park East Fork, from Phillips Park No. 1 Junction to Phillips Park No. 2 Junction. This was authorised retrospectively by the Lancashire and Yorkshire Railway Act 1891 (54 & 55 Vict. c. xcix). An east to north spur at Miles Platting (Brewery Sidings Junction to Ashton Branch Sidings) was authorised by the Lancashire and Yorkshire Railway (Various Powers) Act 1901 (1 Edw. 7. c. cvii); it was opened on 29 January 1906 and has been used mainly by goods trains.

== Medlock viaduct ==
In the early 1880s the viaduct became unsafe because of coal workings beneath and had to be completely renewed by construction of a new double track structure on the north side, replacing the earlier viaduct.

== The present day ==
In 2020 the AS&LJR main line is in use as part of the main line from Manchester to Leeds via Huddersfield. Only the Stalybridge extremity has been closed, as the main line continuation uses the former Great Central and LNWR station. The east curve at Miles Platting is also in use for freight purposes.

The Ardwick branch also continues in use, except that the southern extremity approaching Ardwick has been closed; the line connects eastwards using the Midland Railway's Ancoats curve. The Phillips Park east curve is also still in use. There is no scheduled passenger activity on these lines.

== Location list ==
=== Main line ===
- Miles Platting; main line station; opened 1 January 1844; last train 26 May 1995;
- Phillips Park Junction; later No. 1 Junction;
- Park; opened 26 September 1846; resited westwards 1889; last train Friday 26 May 1995;
- Clayton Bridge; opened 13 April 1846; closed 7 October 1968;
- Droylsden; originally Droylesden; opened 13 April 1846; closed 7 October 1968;
- Ashton; the name Ashton under Lyne was used indiscriminately; opened 13 April 1846; renamed Ashton Charlestown 1868–69; reverted to Ashton 6 May 1968; still open;
- Stalybridge; opened 5 October 1846; closed 1 July 1849; reopened 1 October 1869; closed 2 April 1917.

=== Ardwick branch ===
- Phillips Park No. 1 Junction;
- Phillips Park No. 2 Junction;
- Beswick Junction; Beswick goods connection 1865–1967;
- Midland Junction;
- Ardwick; junction with LNWR main line; the AS&LJR probably had an exchange platform here 1852–53.
