= Philips Park =

Philips Park may refer to:

- Philips Park, Prestwich, England
- Philips Park, Clayton, England
