= Stuart Street =

Stuart Street may refer to:

- Stuart Street, Boston, located in Back Bay, Boston, Massachusetts, U.S.
- Stuart Street, Brooklyn, located in Marine Park (neighborhood), Brooklyn, New York City, New York, U.S.
- Stuart Street, Dunedin, New Zealand
- Stuart Street Power Station, in Bradford, Manchester, England

== See also ==
- Stewart Street
- Sturt Street (disambiguation)
