= Bradford Colliery Brickworks =

Coordinates: 53.483°N 2.202°W

Bradford Colliery Brickworks operated on the site of the Bradford Colliery in Bradford, Manchester, then in the historic county of Lancashire, England, between the early 1870s and 1903. To exploit the seams of fire clay found between the coal seams, colliery manager Edward Williams built a large kiln to a design patented in 1870 by Friedrich Hoffmann, which permitted the continuous production of bricks. One of the largest brick-making facilities in the area, the kiln was more than 30 metres (98 ft) long and 17 metres (56 ft) wide, and probably contained 12–14 separate firing chambers.

The kiln fell into disuse after the colliery's fireclay workings were abandoned in 1903, and it was eventually demolished in the late 1940s. An archaeological excavation carried out in the early 21st century could find virtually no trace of it.
