= Strinesdale Reservoir =

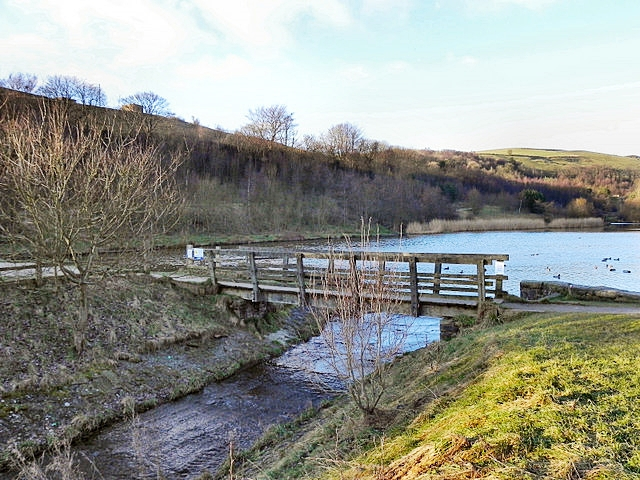

- Location within Greater Manchester
- Location: Greater Manchester
- Coordinates: 53°33′24″N 2°4′4″W
- Lake type: reservoir
- Primary inflows: River Medlock
- Primary outflows: River Medlock
- Basin countries: United Kingdom

Strinesdale is a reservoir situated on the A62 between Oldham and Delph in Greater Manchester, England. The town of Rochdale is to the north and the town of Oldham to the south. It is fed by the River Medlock.

Strinesdale is an area of water and woodland covering approximately 40 acres (162,000 m^{2}). In 1991, the reservoirs were drained and replaced by two smaller lakes with the old reservoir sites being planted with trees and grassland. Herons and kestrels can be seen on the lakeside and as the woodland develops it will provide shelter for animals and birds and many varieties of wild flowers. The site is now used for walking, orienteering and fishing.

The original upper reservoir was built in around 1826 and the erected plaque can be seen at Upper Strinesdale; a second reservoir followed in 1838.

Strinesdale derives its name from the Old English "strine" meaning boundary in connotation to the old Lancashire–Yorkshire boundary that ran through the middle of the site; since 1974 the whole area lies in Greater Manchester.

Strinesdale was home to a children's boarding hospital in the 1950s–1960s.
