= River Tib =

River in Greater Manchester, England

Map of the ancient parish of Manchester, showing the River Tib running through Manchester Township.

The River Tib is a minor tributary of the River Medlock in Manchester, England. It has been culverted along its entire length since about 1783 and now runs beneath Manchester city centre. Tib Street (53°29′01″N 2°14′05″W) and Tib Lane are named after the watercourse.

During the Roman period, the Tib marked the boundary of the vicus or settlement of Mamucium; the river continued to mark Manchester's boundary until medieval times, as well as providing drinking water. A notion concerning the Tib's name, coined by Geoffrey Ashworth in his book The Lost Rivers of Manchester, is that the river was given its name by homesick Roman soldiers after the River Tiber, but with the word shortened to reflect the size difference between the two rivers. Alternatively, the name may derive from the Celtic word for "watercourse".

The river's source is a spring in Miles Platting (53°29′36″N 2°13′08″W), from where it flows underneath Oldham Road and the eponymous Tib Street to reach the city centre. After flowing underneath West Mosley Street, the Tib crosses Princess Street to flow underneath the Manchester Town Hall Extension, the Central Library and the Midland Hotel's dining room, before joining the Medlock at Gaythorn (now First Street, 53°28′23″N 2°14′52″W), close to Deansgate railway station.

Parts of the Rochdale Canal around Lock 89 (Tib Lock) can be emptied into the River Tib by opening a small, original wooden trap door installed during construction. Lock 89 was one of the bottom nine locks opened in 1800.
