= Ashton-under-Lyne railway station =

Railway station in Greater Manchester, England

Ashton-under-Lyne
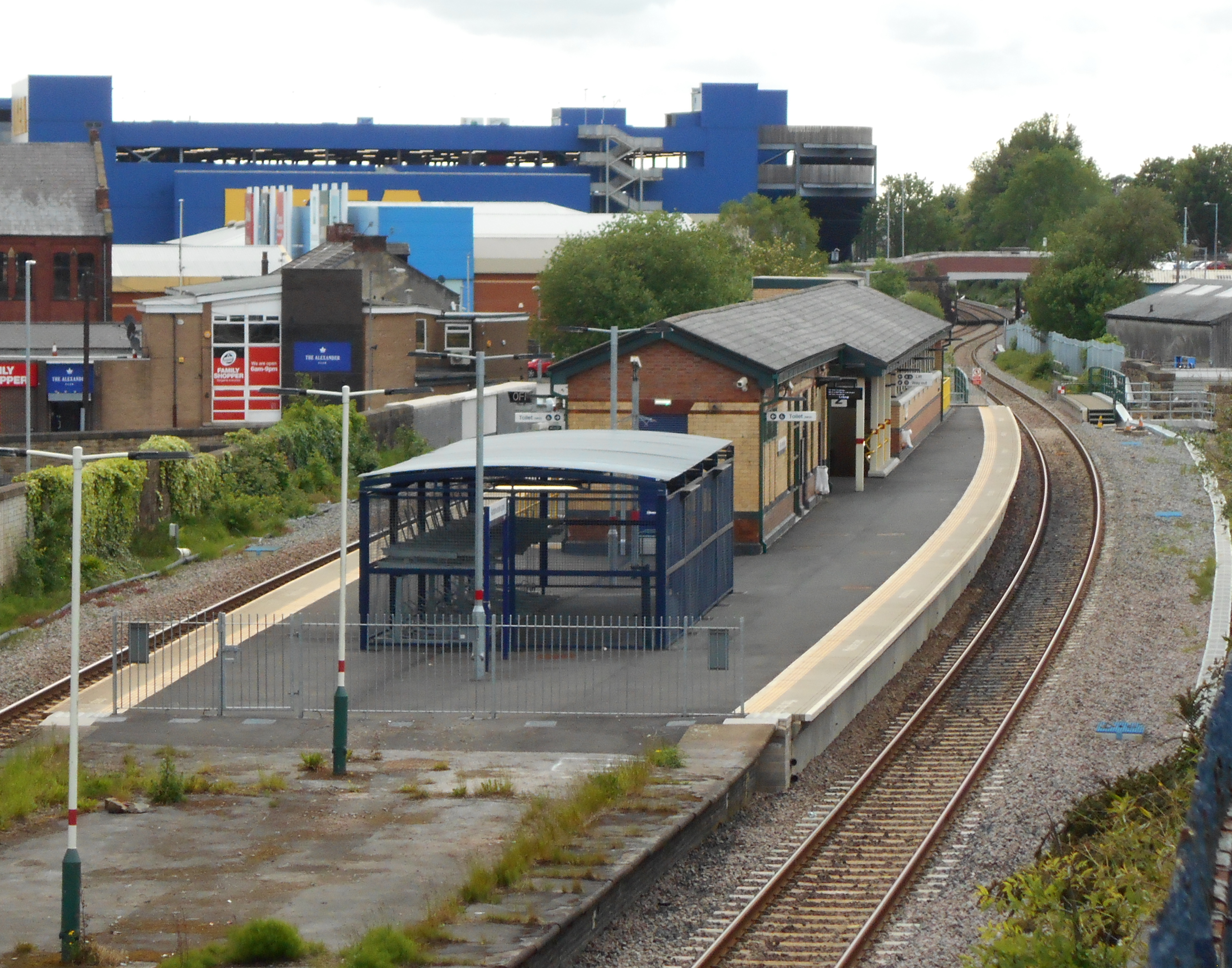
- The station's island platform, looking towards Manchester.

General information
- Location: Ashton-under-Lyne, Tameside; England
- Coordinates: 53.4913°N 2.0943°W
- Grid reference: SJ938993
- Managed by: Northern Trains
- Transit authority: Greater Manchester
- Platforms: 2

Other information
- Station code: AHN
- Classification: DfT category E

History
- Original company: Ashton, Stalybridge & Liverpool Junction Railway
- Pre-grouping: Lancashire & Yorkshire Railway
- Post-grouping: London, Midland & Scottish Railway

Key dates
- 13 April 1846: Opened as Ashton
- 1874: Renamed Ashton (Charlestown)
- 6 May 1968: Renamed Ashton-under-Lyne

Passengers
- 2020/21: ▼70,596
- 2021/22: ▲0.168 million
- 2022/23: ▼0.142 million
- 2023/24: ▲0.154 million
- 2024/25: ▲0.180 million
Location
Notes
- Passenger statistics from the Office of Rail and Road

Ashton-under-Lyne railway station serves the town of Ashton-under-Lyne, in Greater Manchester, England. It lies on the Huddersfield Line 6½ miles (10 km) east of Manchester Victoria and is operated by Northern Trains.

The station is a short walk from Ashton-under-Lyne bus station and Ashton-under-Lyne tram stop which opened in 2013, and is served by Manchester Metrolink trams to Droylsden, Manchester, and Eccles.

== History ==
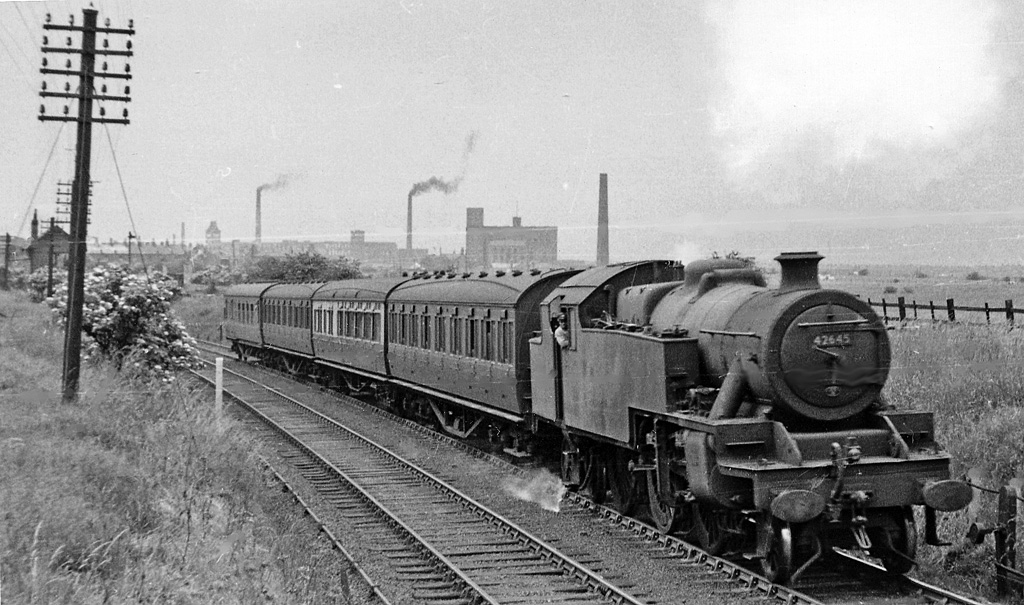
Local train approaching Ashton (Charlestown) Station in 1951

The station, known originally as Ashton, was opened by the Ashton, Stalybridge & Liverpool Junction Railway (AS&LJR) on 13 April 1846. The AS&LJR was absorbed by the Manchester & Leeds Railway in 1847, which was then renamed the Lancashire & Yorkshire Railway (LYR). The LYR renamed it Ashton (Charlestown) in 1874. The LYR amalgamated with the London & North Western Railway at the start of 1922, and these in turn amalgamated with several other companies on 1 January 1923, to form the London, Midland & Scottish Railway during the 1923 Grouping. It then passed to the London Midland Region of British Railways on nationalisation in 1948. It was renamed Ashton-under-Lyne on 6 May 1968.

When Sectorisation was introduced in the 1980s, the station was served by Regional Railways under arrangement with the Greater Manchester PTE until the privatisation of British Rail. Usage at this time was relatively low and trains called only rarely (see BR timetable 1974, 1975 et seq.). The train service was not regular and in essence operated at peak times only.

=== Other stations in Ashton ===
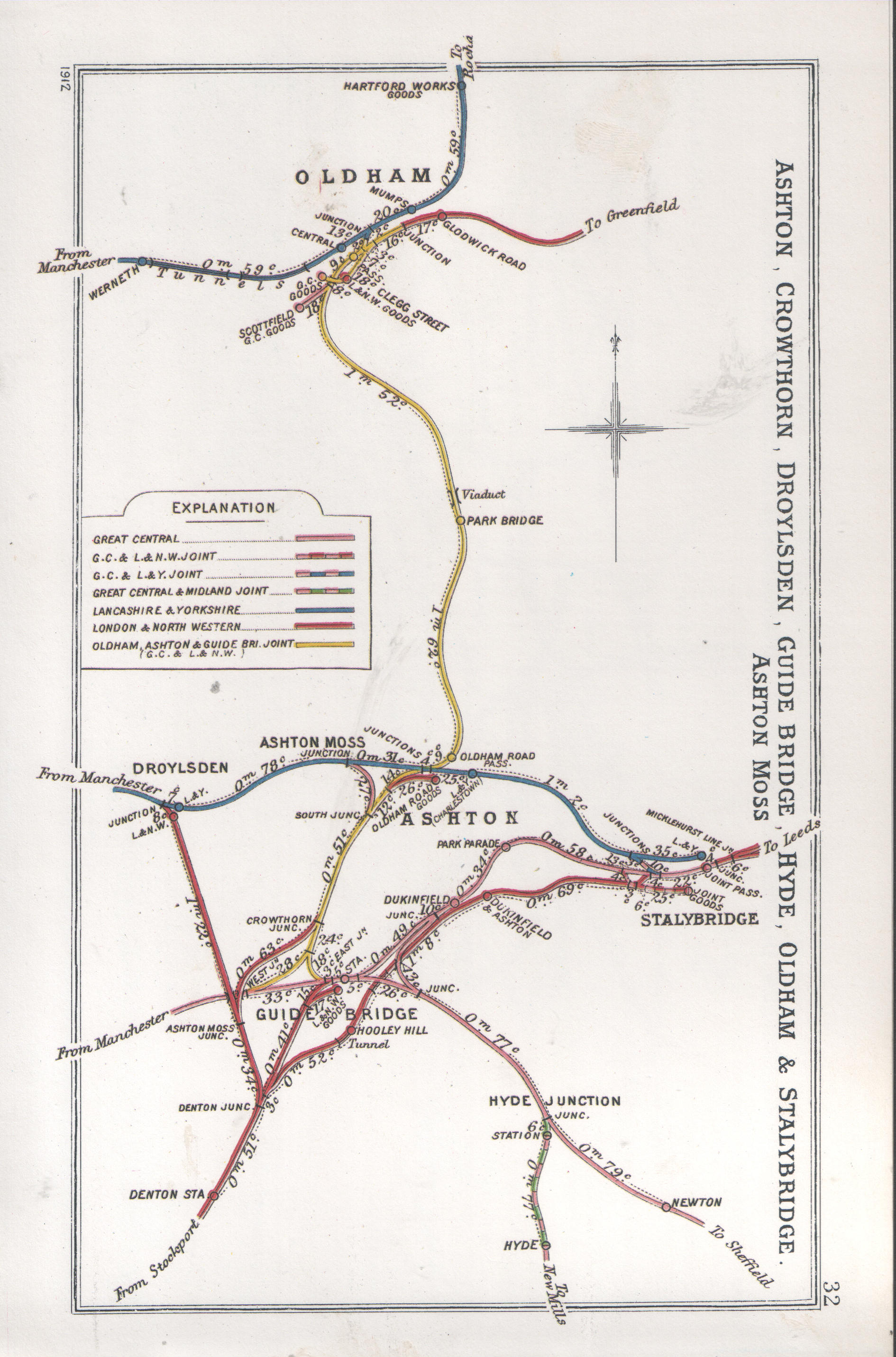
1912 map of railway lines in the area

There were once three stations in the town: Charlestown, Park Parade and Oldham Road. Also, Guide Bridge, a few miles away, was known as Ashton & Hooley Hill and then Ashton in its earliest years.

Charlestown Station — the present Ashton-under-Lyne station — was owned by the Lancashire & Yorkshire Railway, who ran services between Manchester Victoria and Stalybridge. The London & North Western Railway also ran services along the line, most only calling at Ashton and Stalybridge before continuing to Leeds. The station once sported a large booking hall, where the car park is currently, as well as a substantial canopy.

Park Parade Station was located on the Guide Bridge–Stalybridge line; the only remains of the station is the "Station Inn", a short stroll away.

Oldham Road Station was located on the line to Oldham (originally owned by the Oldham, Ashton and Guide Bridge Railway), which continued to Park Bridge before reaching Clegg Street, Oldham.

== Facilities ==
Ashton-under-Lyne station consists of a single island platform, accessible via a ramp from the underpass at street level, it is wheelchair accessible and also has a passenger lift. This was installed due to the 1-in-8 gradient between street level and platform level Facilities of the station include a waiting room, ticket desk, wheelchair-accessible toilet and a hot-drinks vending machine.

A 3-week engineering blockade in July 2017 saw the track through the station re-aligned and a road underbridge replaced to allow for faster line speeds. Replacement buses were provided, with through trains diverted or terminating short at Stalybridge.

== Services ==
The typical off-peak service from the station is:

- 1tph (train per hour) to Manchester Victoria
- 1tph to Stalybridge

The same frequency operates on a Sunday. Trains continue beyond Manchester to Bolton and then either Southport (Mondays to Saturdays) or Wigan North Western (Sundays only).

== Gallery ==
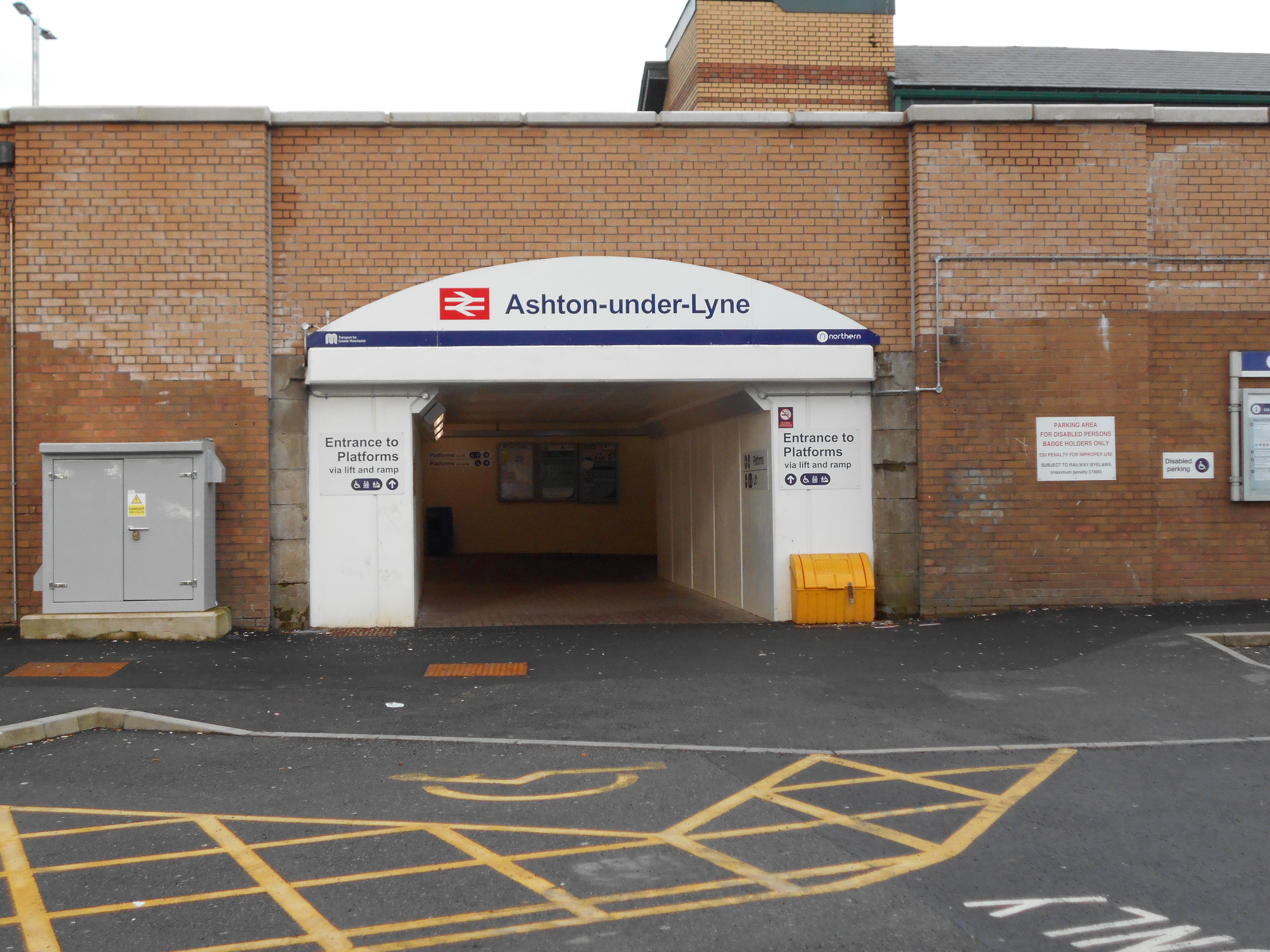
Station entrance

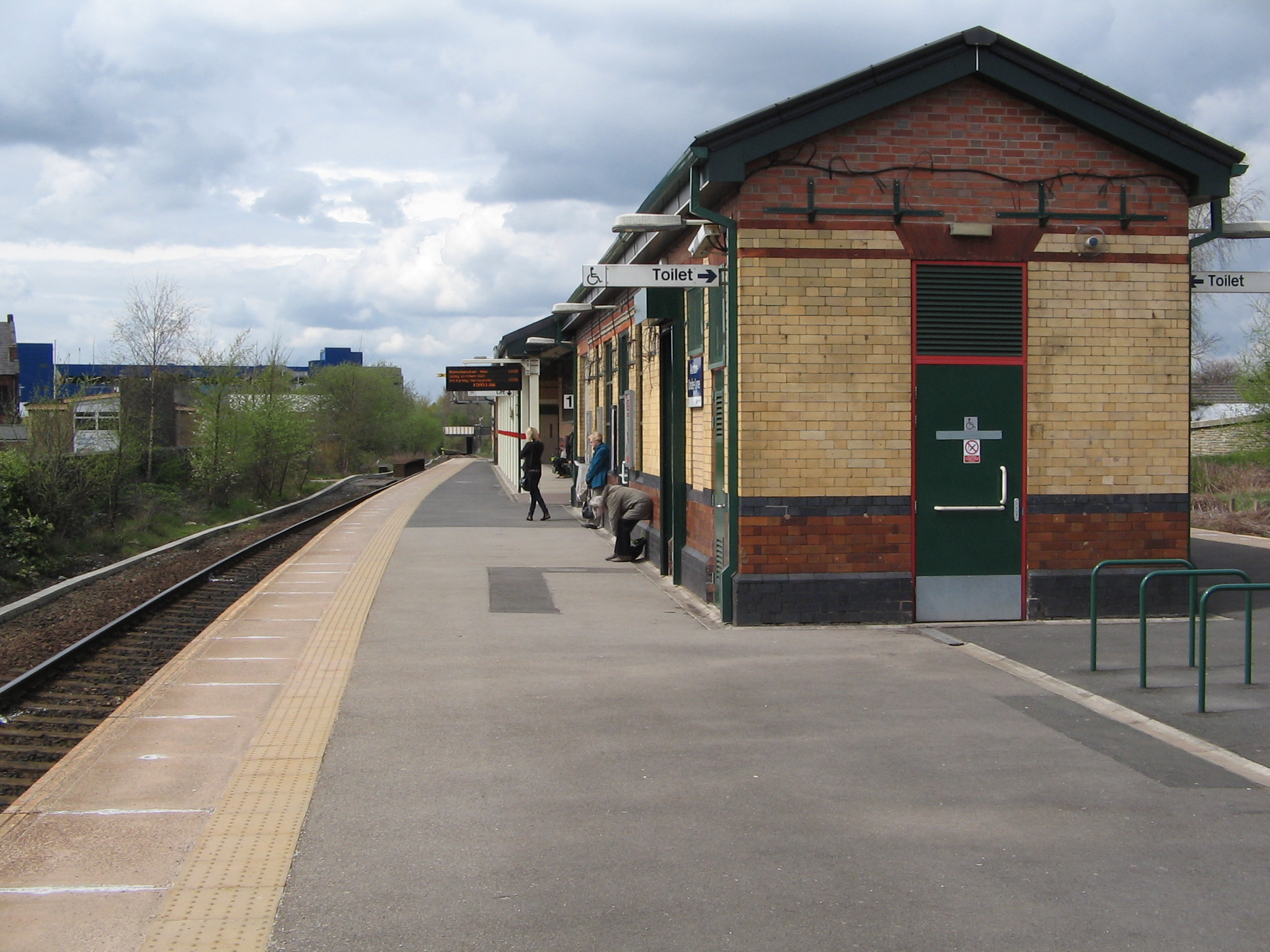
The station platform and building.

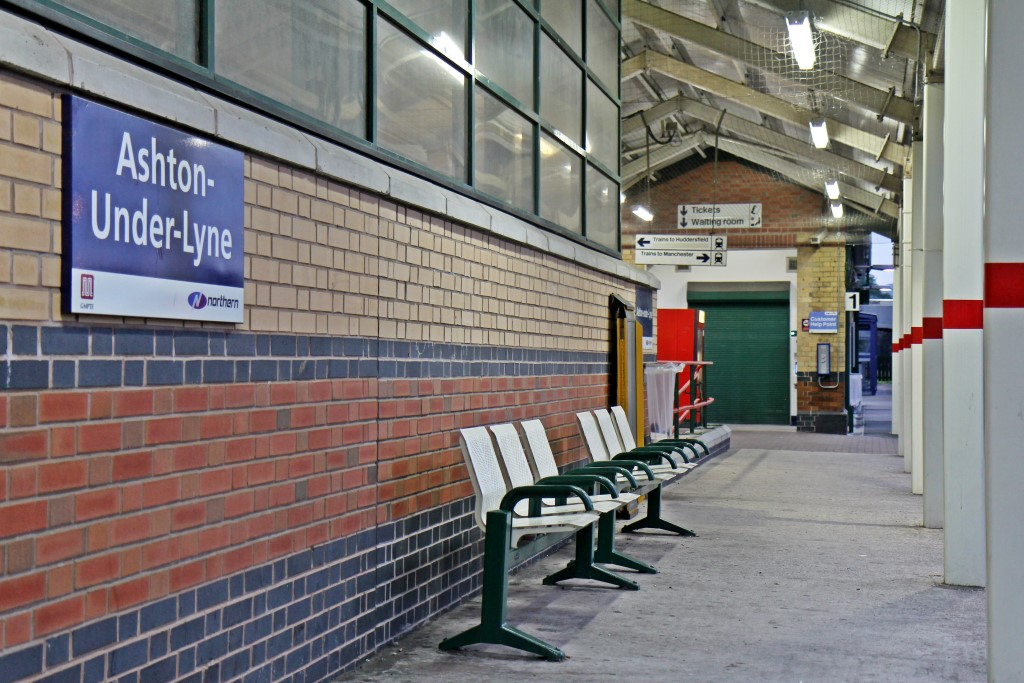
The waiting area on platform 1.

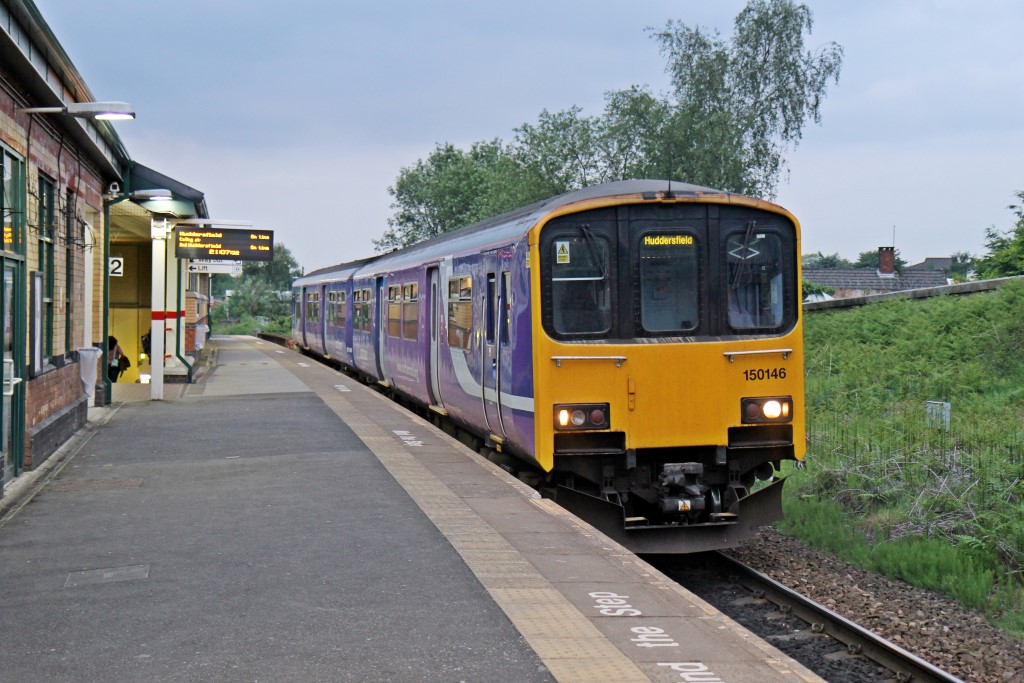
A Northern Class 150 waits at platform 2.

| Preceding station | National Rail | Following station |
|---|---|---|
| Manchester Victoria | Northern; Huddersfield Line | Stalybridge |
| | Disused railways | |
| Droylsden; Line open, station closed | Lancashire & Yorkshire Railway; Ashton, Stalybridge & Liverpool Junction Railway | Stalybridge (L&Y); Line and station closed |
