= Sturt Street =

Sturt Street may refer to:

- Sturt Street, Adelaide, Australia
- Sturt Street, Ballarat, location of the Sturt Street Gardens

== See also ==
- Stuart Street (disambiguation)
