= Droylsden railway station =

Former railway station in England

Droylsden
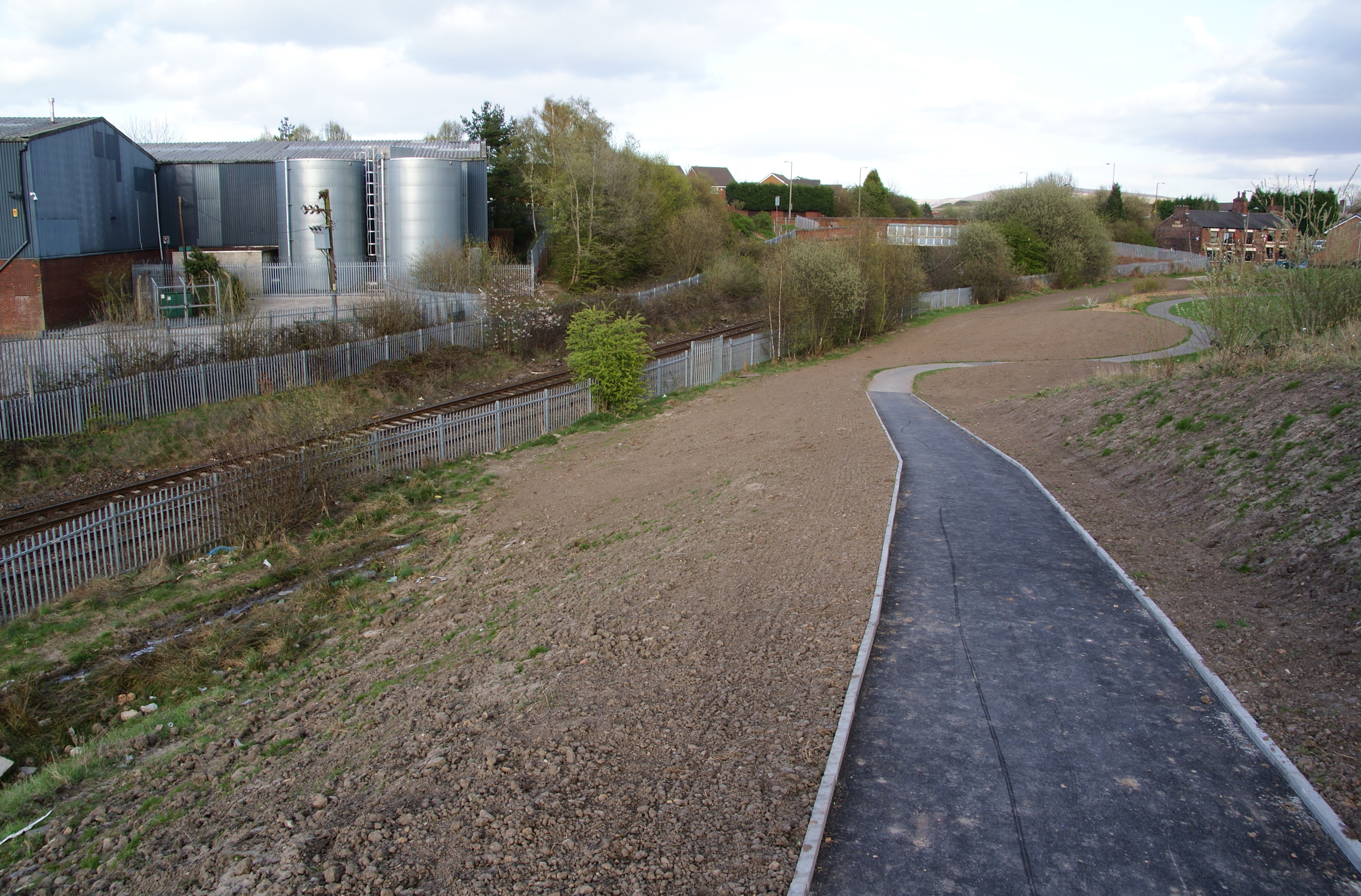
- The site of the station in 2010

General information
- Location: Droylsden, Tameside; England
- Coordinates: 53.4893°N 2.1364°W
- Platforms: 4

Other information
- Status: Disused

History
- Original company: Ashton, Stalybridge & Liverpool Junction Railway
- Pre-grouping: Lancashire and Yorkshire Railway; London and North Western Railway
- Post-grouping: London, Midland and Scottish Railway

Key dates
- 13 April 1846: opened
- 7 October 1968: closed
Location

Droylsden railway station served the town of Droylsden, Greater Manchester, England.

== History ==
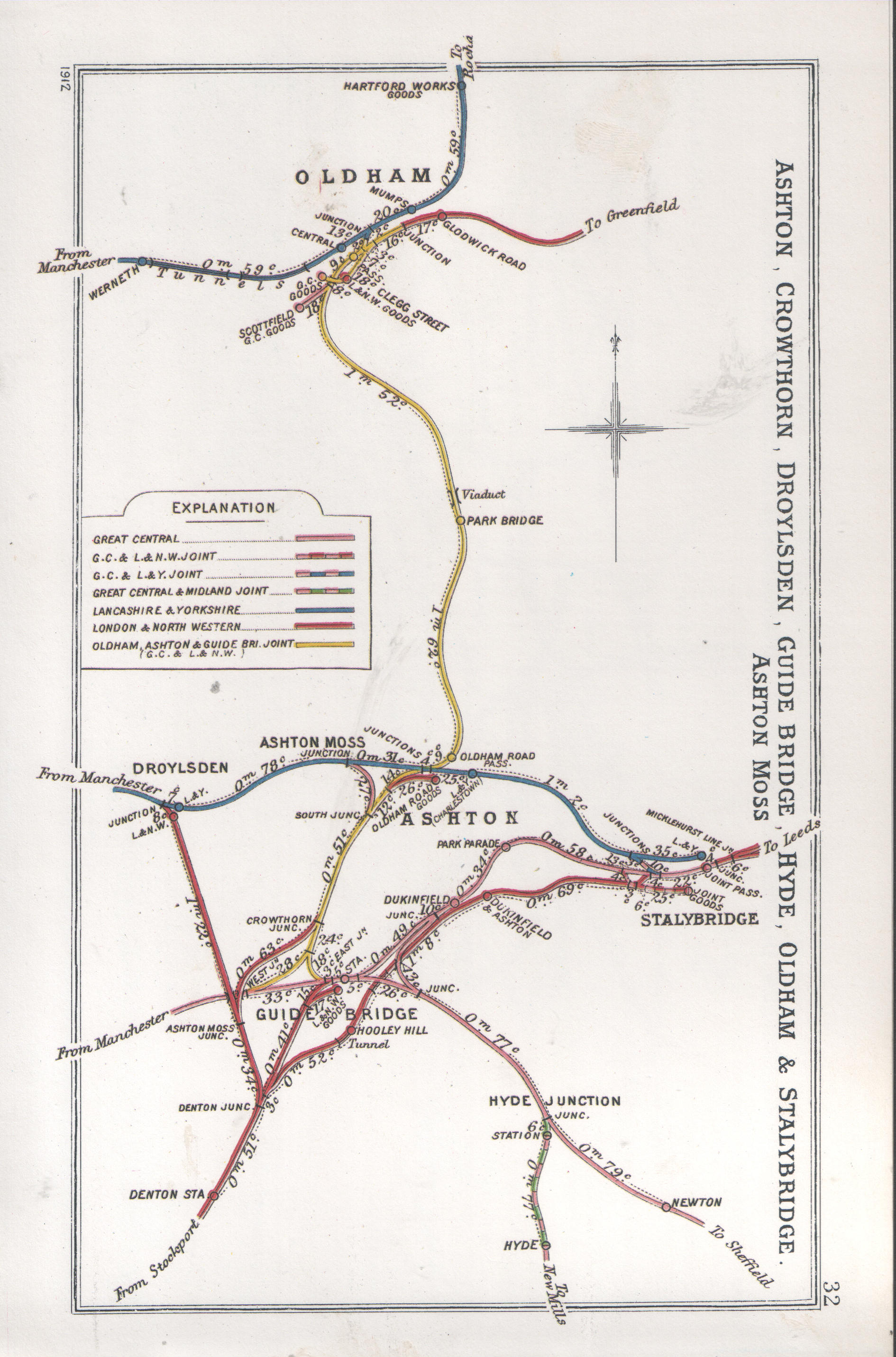
A 1912 Railway Clearing House Junction Diagram showing railways in the vicinity of Droylsden (centre left)

The station was opened on 13 April 1846 by the Ashton, Stalybridge & Liverpool Junction Railway. The Manchester & Leeds Railway took over the running on 9 July 1847, on which date the latter changed its name to the Lancashire & Yorkshire Railway.

The station was closed by British Railways on 7 October 1968.

== Location ==
Droylsden railway station had 4 platforms, two on the original Manchester to Stalybridge line and two on the later London and North Western Railway line to Denton.

The Littlemoss Aqueduct carried the Hollinwood Branch of the Ashton Canal over the railway just west of the station. It was replaced with a footbridge after the canal was closed.

== Routes ==
Preceding station	Disused railways	Following station
Clayton Bridge	L&YR; Huddersfield Line	Ashton-under-Lyne
Clayton Bridge	LNWR	Audenshaw (1883-1905)
