= Stalybridge railway station (Lancashire and Yorkshire Railway) =

Former railway station in Greater Manchester, England

Stalybridge (L&YR)

General information
- Location: Stalybridge, Tameside, England
- Coordinates: 53.48467°N 2.06373°W
- Grid reference: SJ959986
- Platforms: 2

Other information
- Status: Disused

History
- Original company: Lancashire and Yorkshire Railway
- Pre-grouping: Lancashire and Yorkshire Railway

Key dates
- 5 October 1846: Opened
- 2 April 1917: Closed to passengers
- 22 February 1965: Closed for freight
Location

Stalybridge railway station was one of two that served the town of Stalybridge, in Cheshire (now Greater Manchester), England. Owned by Ashton, Stalybridge and Liverpool Junction Railway (AS&LJR), the station was in use from 1846 to 1917; it was the terminus of their line from Manchester Victoria.

== History ==
The station was built by the AS&LJR and opened as the terminus of its 8 1/4 miles (13.3 km) branch from Manchester Victoria to Stalybridge on 5 October 1846. The station was described as "a simple structure with one platform."

It was located adjacent to the Sheffield, Ashton-under-Lyne and Manchester Railway's (SAMR) Stalybridge station, which had opened in 1845; it was the terminus of that company's line from Guide Bridge. On 27 July 1846, the SAMR amalgamated with other railways to become the Manchester, Sheffield and Lincolnshire Railway (MS&LR), which took ownership of the station.

The AS&LJR amalgamated with the Manchester and Leeds Railway (M&LR), and others, to form the Lancashire and Yorkshire Railway (L&YR) on 9 July 1847.

The two adjacent stations were combined in 1849 when the owning companies, the L&YR and the MS&LR, agreed to provide a double junction between the branch lines and to open a joint passenger station. There were separate booking offices on the site of the MS&LR station, with a joint goods depot with separate warehouses taking the place of the L&YR station.

In 1849, the London and North Western Railway (LNWR) opened a line to Huddersfield from this combined station; the station came to be jointly owned by the MS&LR and L&NWR, but also used by the L&YR. The station continued to be used by all three companies and, despite being enlarged in 1858 and with refreshment rooms added in 1859, it remained an unsatisfactory situation. On 1 October 1869, the L&YR reopened their original station for passenger use, following to a disagreement.

In 1884, a large goods warehouse was built. In the following decade, the station had one terminal platform with a bay on either side of it. The station building was at the eastern end, directly facing Rassbottom Street.

A goods shed and warehouse were sited to the north of the passenger station, accessed by small turntables. It was able to accommodate most types of smaller goods, including livestock. It was equipped with a ten-ton crane.

The station was closed to passengers on 2 April 1917 and to freight on 22 February 1965.
