= Bradford Colliery =

Coal mine

Coordinates: 53.483°N 2.202°W

Bradford Colliery, c.1928

Bradford Colliery was a coal mine in Bradford, Manchester, England. Although part of the Manchester Coalfield, the seams of the Bradford Coalfield correspond more closely to those of the Oldham Coalfield. The Bradford Coalfield is crossed by a number of fault lines, principally the Bradford Fault, which was reactivated by mining activity in the mid-1960s.

Coal had been mined at Bradford since at least the early 17th century, when the area around the pits was largely rural; it became increasingly built-up and industrialised as nearby Manchester expanded during the 19th century. Coal was transported from the colliery by canal and railway, but most was consumed locally by the adjacent Bradford Ironworks. In the mid-20th century a 469-yard (420 m) tunnel was dug to supply coal directly to the Stuart Street Power Station.

Damage to buildings in the area around the colliery caused by subsidence led to it becoming uneconomic despite its sitting on large reserves of high-quality coal, and it was closed in 1968. The site was cleared and is now occupied by the City of Manchester Stadium.

== Geology ==
The Bradford Coalfield is isolated from the rest of the Manchester Coalfield; its coal seams, laid down in the Carboniferous period, dip at an average of 1 in 3 towards the south and correspond more closely with those of the Oldham Coalfield. The Upper Coal Measures above the Worsley Four Foot mine (Note: In this part of Lancashire a coal seam is referred to as a mine and the coal mine as a colliery or pit.) horizon were worked at Bradford, where the Worsley Four Foot is known as the Parker mine. The Two Foot, Doctor, New, Yard, Bradford Four Foot, Three Quarters and Charlotte mines, above the Parker mine, are known as the Bradford Group; the Charlotte mine is closest to the surface. The Openshaw mine, above the Charlotte, was worked for fireclay. Below the Bradford Group and the Parker mine are the Top, Middle and Deep mines, and 60 feet (18 m) below them, the Roger mine. The Top, Middle and Deep mines correspond to the Major, Bland, and Ashton Great mines in the Oldham Coalfield. The Crombouke mine in the western coalfield corresponds to the Roger mine at Bradford Colliery. In total the workable seams contained 310 million long tons (347 million short tons) of coal.

The Bradford Coalfield is crossed by a number of fault lines, principally the Bradford Fault. The extraction of coal caused that fault to reactivate in the 1960s, resulting in a scarp that seriously damaged Crompton Hall, a residential complex built in the early 20th century. The building was subsequently demolished.

== Early history ==
The colliery was situated south of the Ashton Canal, built in 1797, and north of Ashton New Road. A short arm of the canal, now filled in, was built to the colliery from between Lock No. 6 and Lock No. 7, Beswick Lock.

Coal has been mined at Bradford since at least the early 17th century, when the endeavour could be very profitable albeit with significant financial risk. Thomas Charnock is recorded as having invested £300 in his Bradford Colliery during the reign of King James I (1603–1624) (equivalent to more than £500,000 as of 2009, (Note: Comparing average earnings of £300 in 1624 with 2009, which may go some way to explaining his "heavy debts and land sales" under James's successor, Charles I.) At about that time the seams at Bradford were producing about 10,000 long tons (11,200 short tons) of coal a year, and probably an average of 20,000–30,000 long tons (22,400–33,600 short tons) a year over the course of the 17th century. The early mines were shallow, exploiting seams close to the surface of what was a largely rural area until the growth of nearby Manchester. Colliery records date from 1740, when Oswald Mosley of Ancoats Hall granted a 200-year lease of mining rights. The first shaft for a deep colliery was sunk in 1840. By 1856 the colliery was in the ownership of Thomas Livesey, and had two 18-foot (5.5 m) diameter shafts to the Parker mine at a depth of 540 yards (490 m), providing ventilation. (Note: Two shafts, one upcast the other downcast, were required to ventilate the underground workings.)

The colliery became known as the Bradford Colliery Company, and by 1896 employed 404 underground and 125 surface workers producing house coal and coal for manufacturing from the Parker mine. The high price of coal at the end of the 19th century persuaded the newly created Fine Cotton Spinners and Doublers Association to mitigate the effects on its members by purchasing the colliery in 1900, thus ensuring a cheap supply of fuel for their steam-powered mills.

== Expansion ==
The new owners embarked on a programme of expansion and installed one of the earliest electrical plants at any colliery in 1900. A sirocco-type ventilation fan made by Hick, Hargreaves, which could be powered by either electricity or steam, was provided. Deepening the downcast shaft to access the Deep mine at 902 yards (825 m) started in 1903 and coal was reached in 1906. A massive timber headgear was built over the downcast shaft and a twin-cylinder vertical winding engine, built by Robert Daglish of St Helens, installed in the engine house. Coal tubs holding 10 cwt of coal were wound, six at a time in double-deck cages. The upcast shaft was used for winding men and had a smaller horizontal winding engine. An earlier shaft at the Forge pit was 155 yards (142 m) deep and used for pumping water from the workings. A windlass was used for winding at this shaft.

By the end of the 19th century the colliery site had become crowded, and included a brickworks that used fireclay and shale spoil from the pit. It was surrounded by housing and factories in what was one of the most industrial parts of Manchester. The ready supply of coal encouraged the development of Manchester's chemical industry around the colliery and in the northeast of the city generally. A factory producing carbolic acid from coal tar was established in 1857, and sulphuric acid and naphthalene were produced from 1865 in nearby Blackley, later the site of ICI's Dyestuff's Division.

Coal was transported by canal and a railway connection to the Lancashire and Yorkshire Railway's Beswick branch built in the early 1900s, but most of it was used locally, transported by road using horse and carts and motor lorries, much of it destined for the adjacent Bradford Ironworks. The company bought a 0-4-0 saddle tank locomotive, Bradford, from the Avonside Engine Company of Bristol in 1928 to shunt wagons to the colliery siding.

== Later years ==
In 1935 the colliery was acquired by Manchester Collieries. It had large reserves of high-quality coal in the Roger mine below the seams already exploited, and although the mines dipped steeply, was a dry and relatively gas-free pit. Manchester Collieries initially improved coal screening but had plans to develop the colliery and maximise output to 4000 long tons (4480 short tons) per day, involving the complete replacement of the surface works. The Parker shaft was deepened to 955 yards (873 m) between 1944 and 1948, and winding installed to accommodate 12-long ton (13.44-short ton) capacity skips. The transport of coal underground was improved by the installation of three-ton mine cars hauled by a battery-powered locomotive and a system of conveyors. A 200-foot (61 m) reinforced concrete winding tower was built to house a Koepe-type friction wheel built by Metropolitan-Vickers.

A new headgear and winding engine were built at the Deep pit shaft; ventilation was by means of two axial-type fans installed in an underground chamber. After 1947 a 460-yard (420 m) tunnel 55 yards (50 m) below ground level was driven to the Stuart Street Power Station, to provide coal direct from the colliery. A conveyor within the tunnel delivered 200 long tons (224 short tons) of small coal an hour to the power station's bunker. Most of the developments begun by Manchester Collieries were completed after nationalisation in 1947 by the National Coal Board (NCB). After modernisation and reconstruction, coal was extracted by longwall mining using coal-cutting machinery and conveyors. This type of mining creates a void or goaf into which the roof is allowed to collapse. At Bradford, which had no spoil heap, the goaf was infilled with spoil or waste. As there was insufficient spoil to fill the void, some was brought from other pits. The NCB incorporated the takes, or coal reserves, of Moston and Ashton Moss Collieries into the redeveloped Bradford Colliery. Moston was closed, but the shafts of Ashton Moss were retained for winding men and equipment.

== Closure ==
By the mid-1960s it was apparent that considerable subsidence was being caused by mining in the built-up area of Manchester around Bradford Colliery. Many buildings were affected, particularly in Bradford and Miles Platting, where in 1962 eleven council houses were so severely damaged they had to be demolished. The government approved an order restricting mining operations and ordered an enquiry to determine whether mining should continue unhindered, and if not whether compensation for loss of production should be paid; for the first time, the NCB required planning permission to mine under the city of Manchester. The NCB gave evidence to the enquiry in 1966 stating that for each ton of coal extracted from the colliery 5s 2d had to be paid out in compensation for surface damage – the highest for any pit in the region – contrasted with a national average of 6d per ton. The NCB's plans for the colliery included extending the mines beneath Collyhurst, Cheetham, and Ancoats, but the risk of causing yet more subsidence proved to be unacceptable. Therefore, despite sitting on "vast reserves of premium coal", Bradford Colliery was closed in 1968 as being uneconomic. In its final year of operation the 1500 workers employed produced 530,298 long tons (593,933 short tons) of coal. The 17-acre (6.9 ha) site, renamed Eastlands, was cleared and its two deep shafts capped with reinforced concrete in a scheme costing £8 million before redevelopment. Part of the site is now occupied by the City of Manchester Stadium.

== Incidents ==
Francis Taylor is the first recorded fatality at the colliery, killed by a roof fall at "Bradford coal pitt" in 1622. Although the mines were relatively gas-free, there were nevertheless some gas-related incidents. One collier, working by the light of a candle in 1874, died from burns received in an explosion of firedamp. In 1907 a miner died in a shotfiring incident, (Note: Shotfiring is the firing of explosive charges.) when gas exploded as a fuse was lit. In 1924 a number of tubs transporting miners being hauled to the surface derailed and dislodged a pit prop, causing a roof collapse, known locally as a crump; three men were killed and nine injured. The heat from a fire in the main winding engine house in 1953 caused the winding cables to snap, sending two coal-carrying cages crashing to the bottom of the main shaft and trapping 350 men underground. All managed to reach a smaller shaft 40 yards (37 m) away and were subsequently brought safely to the surface.

== See also ==
- Glossary of coal mining terminology
