= Oldham Coalfield =

Coal mining region in north west England

The Oldham Coalfield is the most easterly part of the South Lancashire Coalfield. Its coal seams were laid down in the Carboniferous period and some easily accessible seams were worked on a small scale from the Middle Ages and extensively from the beginning of the Industrial Revolution in the early 19th century until the middle of the 20th century.

== Geology ==
The Coal Measures lie above a bed of Millstone Grit and are interspersed with sandstones, mudstones, shales, and fireclays and outcrop in the Oldham district. The Gannister Beds or Lower Coal Measures occupy the high ground of the West Pennine Hills above Oldham where the most productive seam is the Mountain mine. (Note: In this part of Lancashire a coal seam is referred to as a mine and the coal mine as a colliery or pit.) The Lower Coal measures were worked north-east of a line from High Crompton to Greenacres and the Middle Coal Measures to the south-west. The deepest seam in the Middle Coal Measures is the Royley mine which is equivalent to the Arley mine of the Manchester Coalfield. The coal seams dipped in the direction of central Manchester and were broken by numerous faults including the Oldham Edge, Chamber, Oak and Great Faults.

== History ==
Coal was got in "Lennardyne" (Crompton) in 1552 and 70 years later Richard Radcliffe left his coal mines in Chadderton to his son. In A tour thro' the whole island of Great Britain finished in 1727, Daniel Defoe described "...Coals...upon the top of the highest hills" around Oldham. The coal seams were close to the surface and coal was easy to get.

Exploitation of the local coal seams led to the rapid development of early steam-powered cotton mills and 65 had been built in Oldham by 1825. More than 40 collieries were operation in 1841 and the Chamber Colliery Company had seven pits in the 1890s.

== Collieries ==
The early collieries were adits, accessing the coal from outcrops on the side of a hill at Crompton Moor, Oldham Edge and Werneth, employing up to a dozen workers. Shallow pits sunk from the surface with wooden headstocks were recorded in the late 1600s. These collieries had two shafts to aid ventilation. The Chamber Colliery Company's pits were sunk around 1750 by James Lees and the company was formed in 1877. James Watt installed a Newcomen steam pumping engine at the company's Fairbottom Colliery in the late 18th century. It was an atmospheric engine working at the low pressure of 1.5 lb. to the square inch known as Fairbottom Bobs. It is preserved in the USA in the Henry Ford museum.

From the middle of the 19th century the output of the coalfield was sold locally to cotton mills and factories and for domestic use. Platt Brothers owned the Jubilee Colliery in Crompton and Butterworth Hall Colliery in Milnrow. Bower Colliery in Chadderton was sunk between 1860 and 1863 on the site of an older colliery. It was linked to the Rochdale Canal and the rail network. It closed in 1922 when it employed 90 men. The Chamber Colliery Company had seven pits in Chadderton, Oldham and Middleton. They were Stockeld and Denton Lane Collieries, Oak Colliery in Hollinwood, Wood Park, Fairbottom Colliery which had a Newcomen-type pumping engine known as Fairbottom Bobs and Glodwick near Oldham town centre.

Wood Park Colliery produced 89,000 tons of coal in 1954. It had more than 400 employees.
