= Clayton Bridge railway station =

Former railway station in England

Clayton Bridge

General information
- Location: Clayton, Manchester; England
- Coordinates: 53.493°N 2.168°W
- Grid reference: SJ889996
- Platforms: 2

Other information
- Status: Disused

History
- Original company: Ashton, Stalybridge and Liverpool Junction Railway
- Pre-grouping: Lancashire and Yorkshire Railway
- Post-grouping: London, Midland and Scottish Railway

Key dates
- 13 April 1846: Station opened
- 7 October 1968: Station closed
Location

Clayton Bridge railway station, Manchester, was a railway station that served the locality between 1846 and 1968.

== Construction, opening and ownership ==
The station was built by the Ashton, Stalybridge and Liverpool Junction Railway and opened on 13 April 1846. The Manchester & Leeds Railway took over the running on 9 July 1847, on which day the latter company changed its name to the Lancashire & Yorkshire Railway (LYR). The LYR operated the station for the next 75 years before it was absorbed into the London & North Western Railway on 1 January 1922 and the joint company became a major constituent of the London, Midland and Scottish Railway in 1923.

== Location and facilities ==
The station was situated immediately west of where the line crossed Berry Brow in Clayton Bridge near Clayton Vale in Clayton, Manchester. The main station buildings were situated on the Manchester-bound platform, south of the two-track line. A timber-built passenger waiting room was provided on the northerly eastbound platform.

The signal box, situated on the northern side of the line, just east of Berry Brow, was also used to manually operate the level crossing gates. It was fitted with a larger 22 lever LYR frame in 1893. Remotely operated automatic lifting barriers, monitored by CCTV, were installed at the road crossing in 1973 and this resulted in closure of the signal box on 16 December 1973.

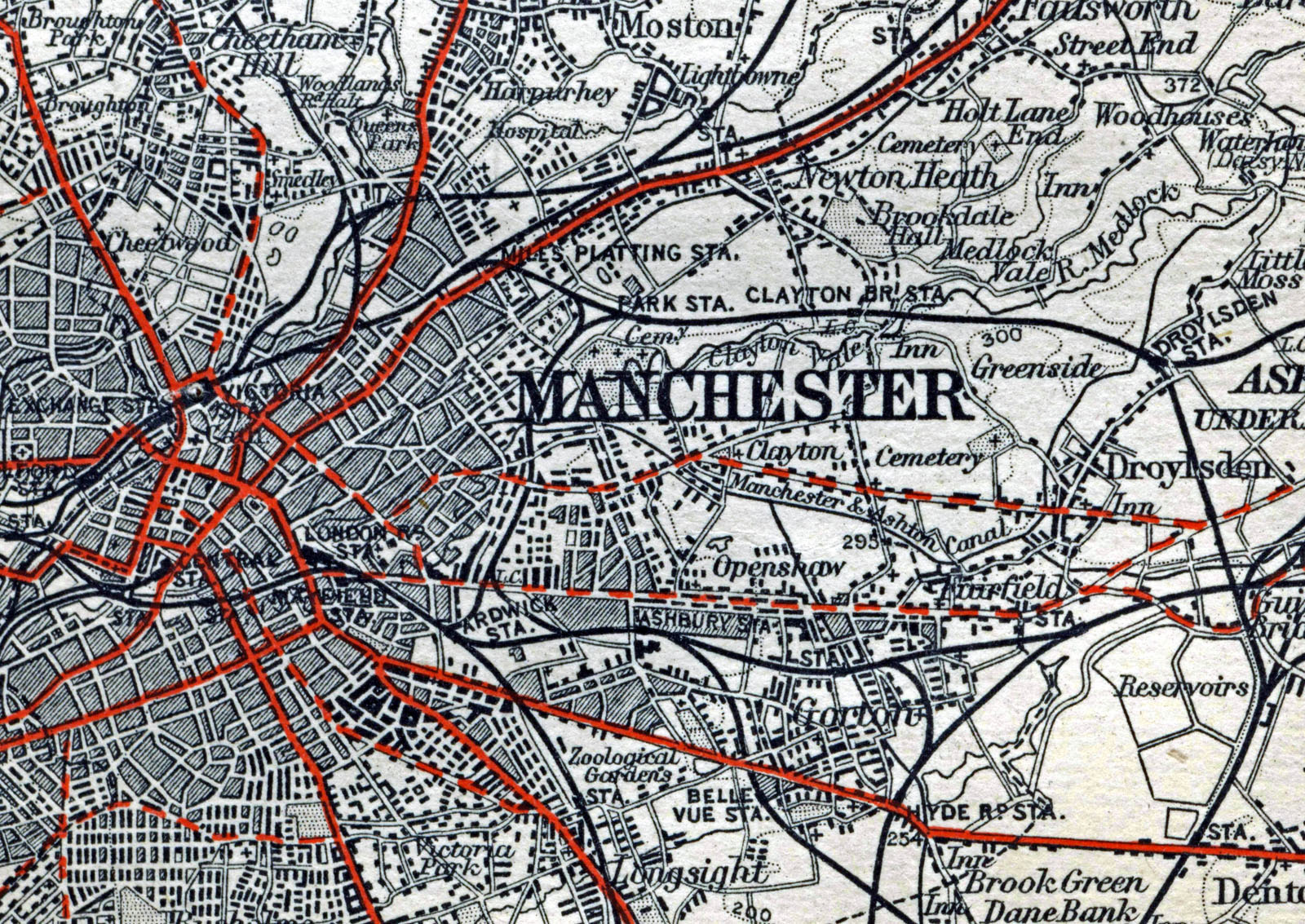
1911 map showing the location of Clayton Bridge station between Park and Droylsden stations.

== Train services ==
During summer 1922, the station was served on weekdays by 21 trains from Stalybridge to Manchester (Victoria) station (a few originating at Huddersfield), and one from Stockport (Edgeley) to Manchester (Exchange) Station. By 1956, the station was served by 17 stopping trains to Manchester on weekdays, with the third class ordinary single fare then being 8d (3p).

== Closure ==
Clayton Bridge station became a victim of the Beeching Axe, closing on 7 October 1968. Nothing now remains of the station buildings, platform or signal box. The level crossing barriers are now remotely operated.

Preceding station	Disused railways	Following station
Park	L&YR; Huddersfield Line	Droylsden
