= Stuart Street Power Station =

Former coal-fired power station

- Country: England
- Location: Lancashire
- Coordinates: 53.4858°N 2.1929°W
- Status: Decommissioned and demolished
- Commission date: 1900
- Decommission date: 1975
- Owners: Manchester Corporation (1900–1948); British Electricity Authority (1948–1955); Central Electricity Authority (1955–1957); Central Electricity Generating Board (1958–1975)
- Operator: As owner

Thermal power station
- Primary fuel: Coal
- Turbine technology: Steam turbines and reciprocating engines

Power generation
- Units decommissioned: All
- Nameplate capacity: 175MW, 106.75 MW (1923), 184.75 MW (1971)
- Annual net output: 136.733 GWh (1971)

Stuart Street Power Station was a coal-fired power station in Bradford, Manchester, England.

== History ==
The station No.1 was built in 1900 and opened in 1902 equipped with six Yates and Thom, 2,500hp steam engines, each engine driving an Electrical Co. Ltd, 1,500 kW, three-phase alternator, giving an output of 6,500 V at 50 Hz. Babcock & Wilcox supplied 24 boilers fitted with mechanical stokers. In 1904, two Wallsend Slipway & Engineering Company, 6000 hp, marine triple-expansion steam engines were installed, each driving a 3,750 kW, 6,500 V, three-phase flywheel alternator. Twelve extra boilers by Babcock & Wilcox were installed to drive the new engines. The plant's first turbine-driven generator was installed in 1907.

In 1920, the power station was, with Liverpool Docks, a target for an IRA plot involving its destruction. The plot was foiled when documents were captured and published.

In 1923 the generators at Stuart Street comprised 1 × 5,000 kW, 3 × 6,000 kW, 1 × 6,500 kW, 1 × 7,500 kW, 1 × 8,000 kW, 1 × 15,000 kW, 1 × 18,000 kW and 1 × 25,000 kW steam turbines, plus 1 × 3,750 reciprocating engine. This was a total of 106,750 kW of generating capacity. These machines were driven by a total of 1.728 million pounds per hour of steam (218 kg/s). In 1923 the combined electricity output of the Manchester Corporation electricity department was 224.240 GWh. This was from Stuart Street, Dickinson Street and Bloom Street generating stations.

In 1934, a modernisation programme began which involved practically rebuilding the whole of the site. Metropolitan-Vickers supplied the turbo-alternators, three 30,000 kW and one 25,000 kW. John Thompson Ltd supplied twelve new boilers. Four new concrete cooling towers were also built. Ferguson, Pailin & Co. were awarded the contract for the new switchgear. The work had to be carried out in stages over the following decade so that the plant could be kept running.

After the Second World War, an additional Metropolitan-Vickers, 60,000 kW turbo-alternator, generating at 33,000 V was installed along with two large John Thompson boilers. The new boilers were amongst the largest that had hitherto been constructed in the UK and had to be housed in a new building along with the electrostatic precipitators that removed particulates from the flue gases. A new chimney and an additional cooling tower also had to be built for the new boilers.

Coal was supplied from Bradford Colliery via a tunnel containing a conveyor belt. Ash from the boilers was taken away by rail and dumped in the nearby Clayton Vale.

In 1948, the station came under the control of the British Electricity Authority following the nationalisation of the electricity supply industry. The station later became part of the Central Electricity Generating Board in 1957.

In 1971 the boilers had a combined steam generating capacity of 1.94 million pounds per hour (538.9 kg/s). The steam conditions were low pressure 350/355 psi (24.1/24.5 bar) and 371/416 °C; and high pressure 600 psi (41.4 bar) and 454 °C. There was a single 66.5 MW and three 30.75 MW turbo-alternators, and the station had a total generating capacity of 184.75 MW. The electricity output in 1971 was 136.733 GWh.

The generating capacity and output from the high pressure and low pressure plant at Stuart Street is given in the following table.

Stuart Street high pressure plant electricity capacity and output
Year	1954	1955	1956	1957	1958	1961	1962	1963	1972
Installed capacity, MW	58	58	58	58	58	See below			
Electricity output, GWh	300.432	413.753	389.268	419.958	239.669				

Stuart Street low pressure plant electricity capacity and output
Year	1954	1955	1956	1957	1958	1961	1962	1963	1967	1972
Installed capacity, MW	111	111	111	111	111	179.75	179.75	184.75	174	184.75
Electricity output, GWh	367.606	299.142	364.347	296.364	353.105	544.644	500.632	517.02	371.75	136.733

In 1946 the combined electricity output of Stuart Street power station was 389.169 GWh of electricity, operating at a load factor of 46.1 per cent, and with a thermal efficiency of 19.15 per cent.

Stuart Street station was closed in 1975.

Demolition took place in the late 1970s; the cooling towers were demolished in February 1978. The station was demolished by MJ Finnigan & Co. The area has been redeveloped and the site is now the location of the Manchester Velodrome.

Dickinson Street Power Station

This was the first station in Manchester was opened in July 1893 and equipped with four 400 hp Galloway engines and six 100 hp Hornsby compound engines. The larger engines were arranged in pairs and were coupled to Elwell-Parker and Edison-Hopkinson dynamos by means of a jockey pulley belt drive. The output of the larger dynamos was 240 kW, and that of the smaller sets 60 kW. In 1901 two 750 kW continuous current Ferranti steam sets were installed. In 1903 two Parson steam turbines were installed driving tandem dynamos of 1,800 kW.

Bloom Street Power Station

This was the second station in Manchester was opened in 1901 the second station at Bloom Street. It consisted of eleven chain-grate coal-fired Babcock and Wilcox boilers, each with an evaporative capacity of 18,000 lb/hr. Steam is fed to four Musgrave slow-speed reciprocating engines of 3000 hp which are coupled to 1,800 kW dynamos.
