= Philips Park, Manchester =

Park in Manchester, England

Philips Park
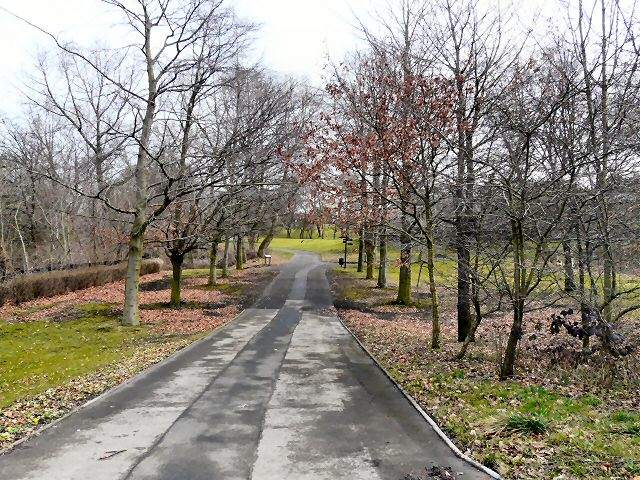
- Philips Park
- Interactive map of Philips Park
- Type: Municipal park
- Location: Manchester, England
- Coordinates: 53°29′21″N 2°11′44″W
- Area: 31 acres (13 ha)
- Created: 1846
- Operator: Manchester City Council
- Website: Philips Park

Philips Park lies in the valley of the River Medlock, in east Manchester, England.

Philips Park provides a mix of woodland, wild grassland, water and rolling hills. The park's other facilities include a visitor centre, park warden service, toilets, children's play area, hard standing ball court, junior football pitch, allotments, community orchard, bowling green and pavilion, a show-field for events, picnic area, seating and quiet areas along with a pond and dipping platform.

The park has a thriving friends group who, alongside the wardens, help organise environmental and educational activities as well as health walks.

Philips Park is well used by the local community and visitors to the area, and is particularly popular for annual events such as Party in the Park, which takes place in the summer as well as hosting one of Manchester's biggest free firework displays in November.

Philips Park opened on 22 August 1846 as one of the world's first municipal parks, intended for free use by the public to encourage a mixing of the classes. It was established by funds raised by public subscription and purchased from the 31-acre estate of Lady Hoghton, a local landowner, for £6,200 (approximately £400,000 in today's money).

The formation and opening of the park was largely due to the commitment of Mark Philips, a local MP, who lobbied considerably for the creation of parks for the working people of the city. In 1844, following seven years of intense campaigning, the ‘Committee for Public Walks, Gardens and Playgrounds’ was set up, and the first three parks were opened on the same day in 1846. The popularity of the park continued for over a century. Many of its original features remain to this day, including the carriage drive, serpentine paths, amphitheatre and the Head Gardener's house. Archaeological finds include a Roman coin, minted in the reign of Emperor Gallienus, and a halberd (a type of spear) from the 16th century.

In 2001, the park was given Grade II Listed status with the National Register of Parks and Gardens of Special Historic Interest in England and was awarded its first Green Flag in 2005.

The park is 2 miles east of Manchester city centre and covers almost 31 acres, bounded to the north by the River Medlock which flows westwards in an open terracotta brick culvert with level banks and central channel within stone walls which retain embankments rising almost 8 feet on both sides. To the west is Alan Turing Way (formerly Mill Street) which has a high stone boundary wall topped with 20th century railings between stone piers. The southern boundary has a high 19th century brick wall with housing to the west end and a bus depot to the east end. To the south-east the boundary is an early-20th century brick-arched mineral railway. The park is adjacent to the City of Manchester Stadium, the Manchester Velodrome and Philips Park Cemetery. The area was once heavily industrialised and the site of Bradford Colliery and much of the area has been cleared and landscaped as a country park.

The park's visitor centre is housed in a lodge commissioned in 1868 from the architect Alfred Darbyshire, who also designed Manchester's Palace Theatre.
