= River Medlock =

River in Greater Manchester, England

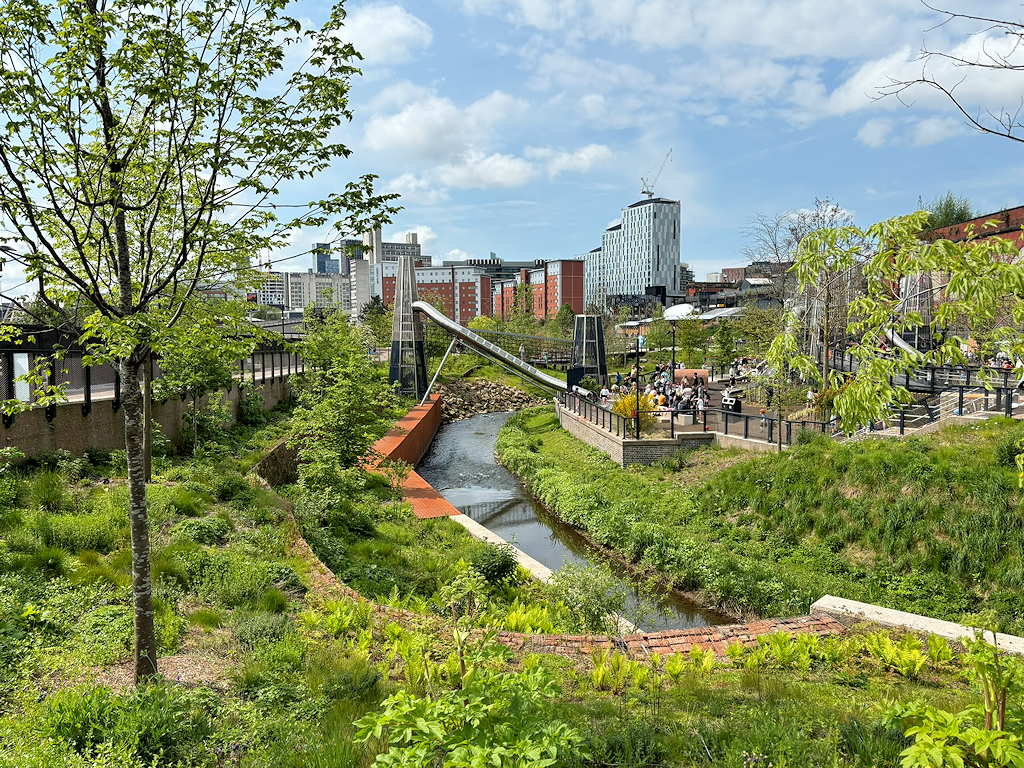
- River Medlock running through Mayfield Park, Manchester

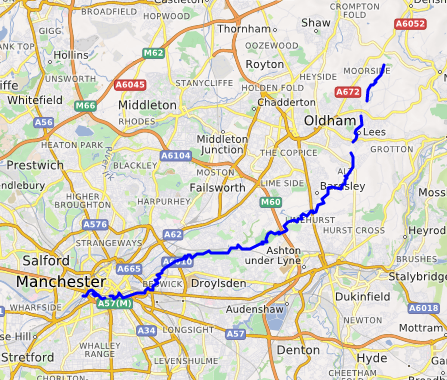

Location
- Country: England

Physical characteristics
- Source
  - location: between Oldham and Saddleworth, Pennines
- Mouth
  - location: River Irwell
  - coordinates: 53°28′27″N 2°15′12″W
- Length: 16 km (9.9 mi)

The River Medlock in Greater Manchester, England, rises in east Oldham and flows south and west for 10 miles (16 kilometres) to join the River Irwell in Manchester city centre.

== Sources ==
Rising in the hills that surround Strinesdale just to the eastern side of the Metropolitan Borough of Oldham, the Medlock flows through the steep-sided wooded gorge that separates Lees from Ashton-under-Lyne and the Daisy Nook Country Park with its 19th century aqueduct carrying the disused Hollinwood Branch Canal over the shallow river.

== Lower reaches ==
The final miles of the river flowing to the River Irwell have been extensively modified. The river is culverted underneath the car park of the City of Manchester Stadium (the site of a former gasworks). It is visible flowing through Mayfield Park and under a bridge on Baring Street, close to Piccadilly station, before running again in a culvert beneath the former University of Manchester Institute of Science & Technology campus (London Road (A6) to Princess Street), then under Hulme Street, until it appears briefly at Gloucester Street before flowing under the former gasworks at Gaythorn, reappearing at City Road East.

At the point where Deansgate and Chester Road (A56) meet (under the Bridgewater Viaduct), the river meets the Bridgewater Canal head on, where a sluice gate (a listed structure) allowed water to feed the canal, until the water quality of the Medlock became too polluted for canal use. Normally, the level of the river is several feet below the level of the canal, and the river is carried in a tunnel under the Castlefield canal basin, reappearing at Potato Wharf, where it is supplemented by excess canal water draining into a circular weir. When the river is in flood, the tunnel cannot cope and river water enters the canal, flows across the basin, and exits via the weir and manually operated gates. One-quarter mile (400 metres) further on, the Medlock enters the Irwell adjacent to the bottom gate of the disused Hulme Locks. Manchester's Princess Street road bridge over the River Medlock was manufactured by E. T. Bellhouse & Co, Manchester in 1842.

== Navigation ==
In the latter part of the 18th century the river was navigable at least between the Bridgewater Canal (at Deansgate) and the site of India House (on Whitworth Street). At India House was the entrance to a tunnel used to carry coal to a wharf at Store Street (by Piccadilly station). The tunnel mouth is still visible. The tunnel was rendered obsolete by silting of the river and the construction of the Rochdale Canal.

== Notable features ==
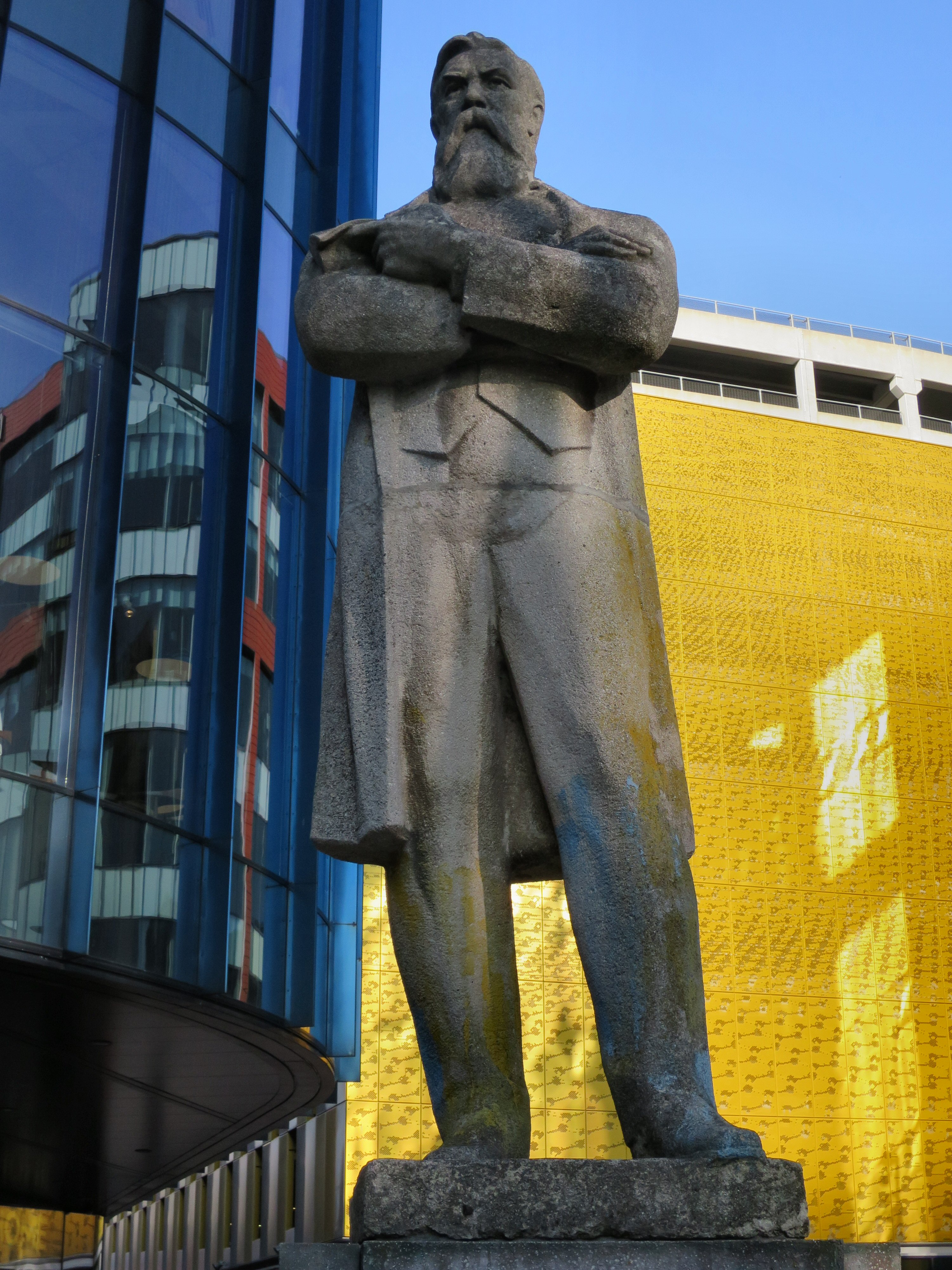
Statue of Friedrich Engels

The area just south of Oxford Road railway station enclosed by the railway line and the loop in the river was known as Little Ireland, and was described by Friedrich Engels as "the most horrible spot" of the area. It is commemorated by a red plaque on the wall of 8 Great Marlborough Street, about half-way between New Wakefield Street and Hulme Street.

About 3/8 mile (600 metres) west of the plaque, there stands the Statue of Friedrich Engels at Tony Wilson Place. The statue was moved from Ukraine after the dissolution of the Soviet Union, and has the now-culverted flow of River Medlock between Anne Horniman Street and City Road East beneath.

The telephone exchange name, and subsequent dialling code for the area around Strinesdale, Moorside, and Grains Bar, was Medlock Head, abbreviated to MED for dialling. This was so at the time of the introduction of Subscriber Trunk Dialling to the area in the 1960s. The name owed less to local geography than to technology. The code MED was rendered as 633 on the telephone dial. MAI, the code for Oldham Main, was 624. Post Office Telecoms equipment of the day worked better when discrete local geographical areas, then with relatively few subscribers, had similar prefixes. These numbers, and others beginning with 6, remain in use in Greater Manchester, prefixed by 0161.

== Tributaries ==
- River Tib
- Shooter's Brook
  - Newton Brook
- Lord's Brook
- Lumb Brook
- Taunton Brook
- Holden Brook
- Little Bankfield Brook
- Rabbit Brook
- Rowton Brook
- Thornley Brook
  - Ashes Brook
  - Wood Brook
- Sheep Washes Brook
- Roebuck Low Brook

Next confluence upstream	River Irwell	Next confluence downstream
River Irk (East)	River Medlock	-
