= Woodhey High School =

Coordinates: 53.6345°N 2.3303°W

Location
- Bolton Road West; Ramsbottom, Bury, BL0 9QZ; England

Information
- Type: Academy
- Established: 1979
- Local authority: Bury
- Trust: Shaw Education Trust
- Department for Education URN: 148097 Tables
- Ofsted: Reports
- Chair of local governing body: Gillian Hoyle
- Head teacher: Dean Watson
- Gender: Coeducational
- Age: 11 to 16
- Colours: Maroon and Gold
- Website: http://www.woodhey.bury.sch.uk/

Woodhey High School is a coeducational secondary school in Ramsbottom, in the Metropolitan Borough of Bury, Greater Manchester, England.

Woodhey High School was built by Bury LEA (Local Education Authority) in 1979 to replace the Peel Brow Secondary Modern school. Previously a community school administered by Bury Metropolitan Borough Council, in October 2020 Woodhey High School converted to academy status. The school is now sponsored by the Shaw Education Trust.

== Location ==
Woodhey High School is located near towns such as Bury, Bolton, Ramsbottom and Tottington and the suburbs of Brandlesholme, Greenmount and Edenfield and Rawtenstall. The address is: Woodhey High School, Bolton Road West, Ramsbottom, Bury, BL0 9QZ. The school has had major building work and renovation work that included several new classrooms and facilities around the school in 2013.

== Education ==
Secondary education is provided at Woodhey High School for 11- to 16-year-olds (Years 7 to 11). Many subjects are available to study at Woodhey including: Art, English Literature, English Language, Maths, (Double Award) Science (including Biology, Chemistry, Physics), History, Geography, Music, Information Technology, Business Studies, Electronics, Spanish, Personal Social Health Citizenship Education, Computer Science, Child Development, Physical Education, Drama, iMedia and Sports Science

== Uniform ==
In 2007, the school announced it was banning skirts from its uniform, saying that parents and members of the local community had complained they "create an unfavourable image of the school."

In September 2022, parents at the school complained that under the school's new uniform policy, their daughters were told their trousers were "too tight" despite them being purchased from official suppliers. One parent claimed that female pupils were told to "lift their shirts up" so that staff could check their trousers. The school denied it had threatened any students with "exclusion" and said that students being told their trousers were too tight was "in relation to the school’s new stronger enforcement of their uniform rule".
