= Spectrum Gaming =

British autism charity

- Formation: May 2020; 6 years ago
- Location: United Kingdom
- CEO: Andy Smith
- Website: https://www.spectrumgaming.net

Spectrum Gaming is a charity which provides an online community for autistic children in the United Kingdom. It was founded in May 2020 by Andy Smith, and became a registered charity in the United Kingdom in March 2021.

== History ==
Spectrum Gaming was founded by Andy Smith, an autistic adult from Bury, Greater Manchester, who after struggling as an autistic person, met other autistic people online who grew to accept their autism diagnosis. In 2017, he set up a Facebook page called 'Autistic Life', which shared educational content about autism. In 2020, he founded Spectrum Gaming to create an online community for autistic children, which became a registered charity in 2021. This has since expanded to include face-to-face gatherings, particularly in Greater Manchester.

Spectrum Gaming also does advocacy work. This includes Autism Understood, which is a website that contains resources written and contributed by autistic people. Furthermore, they have delivered a conference commissioned by Bury Council, and have delivered training to more than 2,100 people in 2023.

== Awards ==
In 2022, Spectrum Gaming was nominated a BBC Make A Difference award.

In 2023, Founder and CEO Andy Smith received a Points of Light award from the then British Prime Minister, Rishi Sunak, and also received a Great Minds Together award in the 'Inspirational Professional Award' category.
