= Brandlesholme =

Coordinates: 53.6102°N 2.3149°W

- Location within Greater Manchester
- Metropolitan borough: Bury
- Metropolitan county: Greater Manchester
- Region: North West
- Country: England
- Sovereign state: United Kingdom
- Post town: BURY
- Postcode district: BL8
- Dialling code: 0161
- Police: Greater Manchester
- Fire: Greater Manchester
- Ambulance: North West
- UK Parliament: Bury North

Brandlesholme Road, Bury

Brandlesholme is an area in the town of Bury in Greater Manchester, England. The boundary between Brandlesholme, Bury and the North Manor area of Bury is Wood Road Lane, close to the junction of Brandlesholme Road and Longsite Road.

Brandlesholme Road (B6214) is the main road through the area. At its furthermost south junction it meets with Tottington Road and Crostons Road, providing access to Bury town centre. Northwards at a stretch of open farmland, the road forks, bearing left to Greenmount with links to Tottington and Bolton, and right to Holcombe Brook, Summerseat and Ramsbottom. Frequent bus services run along the road every 15 minutes throughout Monday to Saturday daytime.

== History ==
In the 13th century a small number of people were living in Brandlesholme. The name belonged to a family who administered the local forests on behalf of Henry III but following marriage they were replaced by the Greenhalgh family. This family lived in Brandlesholme Old Hall, one of the oldest buildings in Bury on the northern outskirts of Brandlesholme. The building comprises the remains of a medieval hall, a single storied cruck-built structure with two farms and a Victorian wing built up around it. A map at Rufford Old Hall shows that until at least 1610, Brandlesholme was known as Brandleffham (Brandlessham).

Historically, mills tended to be located along rivers and streams. Kirklees Brook runs to the west of Brandlesholme and in the 18th century mills stood on the site of the old Kirklees Bleachworks, now demolished and redeveloped into a new housing estate named Miller Brook. In 1884, a French chemist, Hilaire de Charbonnet, Comte de Chardonnay, moved to the area to work on a cellulose-based fabric that became known as "Chardonnay silk". A forerunner of rayon it was an attractive cloth, but like celluloid it was very flammable. Eventually, following numerous accidents, it was taken off the market. More recently the mill was known locally as Courtaulds after the textile company who took over the site in 1962. Its occupation, latterly as a dyehouse, ended in 1980.

== Housing ==
To the west of Brandlesholme Road lies the Garside estate, a sizeable council-housing estate of terrace houses, a small middle class area along Birks Drive and a middle class estate encapsulating Bankhouse Road. To the east, two further sizeable additional estates exist, one encapsulating Trimingham Drive and Hunstanton Drive and the other Rudgwick Drive and Springside View. A second council-housing estate lies south of Brandlesholme on Woodhill Road. The latest housing development in the area is at the bottom of Garside Hey Road. Named Miller Brook, this new development is located besides Kirklees Brook between Brandlesholme and the neighbouring town of Tottington.

== Schools ==
Local primary schools include Our Lady of Lourdes RC Primary School, Old Hall Primary School and Woodbank Primary School. Brandlesholme County Primary School previously existed until the late 1990s, when it was demolished as a result of demographic change in the area.

Brandlesholme is served by Tottington High School, Woodhey High School and Elton High School in terms of secondary education, but many students attend church-aided secondary schools, St Gabriel's High School or Bury Church of England High School or the private Bury Grammar School in the town centre.

== Shops & services ==
There is a small selection of shops in Brandlesholme Shopping Precinct, known locally as the 'Top Shops'. They include a Tesco Express convenience store, a sandwich takeaway and bakery, hairdresser's, chemist's, English fish and chip shop, Chinese takeaway, pizza parlour, florist and an off licence. A newsagents, Welcome Newsagents, is located further south next to Woodbank School.

Brandlesholme has the Prospect Service Station, which houses a Spar convenience store and a Subway branch to the south and also the Brandlesholme Service Station to the north which borders with Greenmount. A cattery exists at Brandlesholme Hall Farm.

== Economy ==
William Hare Group has its headquarters in Brandlesholme. It is an independent steel design and fabrication company in the UK with an annual turnover in excess of £190 million.

== Recreation ==
Peel Tower can be seen from Brandlesholme. The area is home to three children's parks: Hunstanton Park, located within walking distance of Burrs Country Park; Purbeck Park, on the Rudgwick estate; and Brandlesholme Park, a newly created facility on the land of the old primary school.

=== Burrs Country Park ===
About a mile from the centre of Bury is Burrs Country Park which covers an area once housing the mill complex of the Burr and Higher Woodhill cotton mills. Situated on both sides of the River Irwell, it is overlooked by Castlesteads, an Iron Age/Roman settlement and hill fort and one of only four Scheduled Ancient Monuments in Bury. The local public house, the Brown Cow, is one of the oldest buildings in Bury. A number of sculptures that form part of the Irwell Sculpture Trail are located within the park, which is the base for the Burrs Activity Centre where a popular sport is canoeing. The East Lancashire Railway runs through the park. The latest addition is a Caravan Club caravan and camping site and the adjacent showground is used by the Bury Show and similar events.

=== Sport ===
Local sports teams include Woodbank Cricket Club and Brandlesholme Warriors. Established in 1935, Woodbank Cricket Club team play in the Lancashire County League. Its ground, Kenyon's is named after a local family who were involved when the club was established, and supported it for many subsequent years. Brandlesholme Warriors are a local junior football club.

== Landmarks ==
=== Brandlesholme Old Hall ===
Grade II 13th Century Listed Building located in the north of the borough. In the time of Henry I it was the residence of bailiff to Montbegon and later de Lacey lands whose name was Brandlesholme. By marriage, the house descended to Greenhalghs who remained for 11 generations till 1730s. Post Code BL8 4LS

=== Cruck Barn ===
North East of Brandlesholme Old Hall. Possibly 16th Century, constructed from roughly cut local sandstone, coursed externally only. Gables of brick. Entry in middle of each side. Stone slab roof on 3 massive cruck trusses.
