= Listed buildings in Tottington, Greater Manchester =

Tottington is a town in the Metropolitan Borough of Bury, Greater Manchester, England, and the area also includes the villages of Walshaw and Greenmount and the surrounding countryside. The area is unparished, and contains 33 listed buildings that are recorded in the National Heritage List for England. Of these, two are listed at Grade II*, the middle grade, and the others are at Grade II, the lowest grade. The area is partly agricultural and partly residential, and its listed buildings include farmhouses and farm buildings, private houses and associated structures, an ancient cross, churches and associated structures, a village lock-up, and schools.

== Key ==
Grade	Criteria
II*	Particularly important buildings of more than special interest
II	Buildings of national importance and special interest

== Buildings ==
Name and location	Photograph	Date	Notes	Grade
Old cross 53.61916°N 2.37235°W		Medieval (probably)	The cross is in stone, the base being the older part, and the shaft possibly dating from the 18th century. It consists of three circular steps and a roughly cut Tuscan column with a mortise cut into the top.	II
Brandlesholme Old Hall; 53.61470°N 2.32257°W	—	13th century	Originally a cruck-framed house with an open hall, it was altered and extended in the 16th century, and remodelled in 1849. The hall is rendered, and has two two-storey projecting gabled wings of differing sizes, each with bargeboards, and each containing a moulded oriel window. Behind at right angles is a range with a slate roof and 1 1/2 storeys containing the medieval hall. Inside the hall is a large inglenook fireplace.	II*
Cruck barn, Brandlesholme Old Hall; 53.61507°N 2.32236°W	—	15th or 16th century	The barn is in sandstone with brick gables, and has entrances in the middle of each side. Inside are three massive cruck trusses and two aisled sections.	II
High Crompton Farmhouse; 53.59967°N 2.34701°W	—	17th century (probable)	A stone farmhouse with quoins and a stone slabbed roof. There are two storeys, three bays, an extension to the right, and a rear stair wing. The windows are mullioned with casements, and on the ground floor they have hood moulds. In the extension there are no windows on the front, but there is a blocked opening. The doorway has a massive, slightly arched lintel.	II
Three Gates; 53.62445°N 2.36790°W	—	17th century	A rendered stone house with a stone slab roof. It has 1 1/2 storeys and two bays, and the windows have chamfered mullions.	II
Outbuilding, Tottington Hall; 53.61300°N 2.34039°W	—	Late 17th or early 18th century	The building is in stone with two storeys. In the west gable end is a mullioned window, in the east gable end is an oculus with a bevelled surround, and along the sides are sash windows.	II
2, 4 and 6 Stormer Hill Fold; 53.61752°N 2.34150°W		1724	A terrace of three stone cottages with quoins and a stone-slate roof. There are two low storeys, three mullioned windows on the ground floor, and replaced windows above.	II
Greenhalgh Fold; 53.62590°N 2.34457°W	—	1744	A stone house with a slate roof, two storeys and two bays. The central doorway has an architrave with a keystone. The windows are mullioned, and above the ground floor windows are hood moulds.	II
Barn, Brookhouse Farm; 53.62111°N 2.34144°W	—	18th century	The barn was extended to the west in the 19th century, and to the rear in the 20th century. It is in sandstone and some brick, with quoins, a stone flag roof, and the original part has three bays. On the front is a cart entrance, windows, a pitching hole, and square vent holes.	II
Outbuildings, Stormer Hill Fold Farm; 53.61792°N 2.34175°W	—	Mid-18th century (probable)	The outbuildings consist of a shippon and a stable, and a barn. The shippon and a stable are in brick with a stone slab roof, and the barn is in stone with a slate roof.	II
Stormer Hill Fold Farmhouse; 53.61777°N 2.34167°W		1759	The farmhouse and barn, which is recessed to the left, are in stone with quoins and a common roof ridge with ball finials at the ends. The house has two storeys, three sash windows, and two inserted windows, and the barn has a cart entrance and three tiers of ventilation slits. In the gable end is a stone carved with the date and names.	II
Stormer Hill House; 53.61762°N 2.34211°W	—	1762	A brick house with a moulded eaves cornice and a stone slab roof, it has three storeys and four bays. The doorway has a moulded surround, a rectangular fanlight, and a cornice hood on brackets. On the ground floor are two bay windows, and the other windows have keystones; on the middle floor they are sashes, and on the top floor they are casements. In the gable end facing the road are two rectangular bay windows, and square windows with keystones. At the rear is a doorway with a reeded doorcase, mullioned and transomed windows on the middle floor, and mullioned windows on the top floor.	II
Bradshaw Head Farmhouse and barn 53.62566°N 2.37870°W	—	Mid to late 18th century	The farmhouse and attached barn are in stone with a stone-slate roof. There are two storeys, the house has two bays, and the barn has three. The windows in the house are mullioned, and the door has a plain surround. In the barn are windows, doors and ventilation slits, and at the left is a lean-to extension.	II
Commemorative stone 53.61304°N 2.33987°W	—	1774	The inscribed stone has been moved from a former school. It now stands to the north of a bowling green to the east of Tottington Hall.	II
Former coach house, Lower Walshaw House; 53.60398°N 2.34187°W	—	c. 1774	The coach house is in stone with quoins, a moulded gutter cornice, a slate roof, and two storeys. In the centre is an arched doorway with impost blocks and a keystone. To the right is a cart entrance with a quoined surround and a segmental head, and on the upper storey are two oculi. In the right return is another oculus, and at the rear are sash windows.	II
North House; 53.61779°N 2.34214°W	—	Late 18th century	The house was created from the north wing and the former stables of Stormer Hill House, and is in brick with two storeys. Some of the windows are mullioned and others are modern. In the former stable external steps lead up to a first floor door.	II
Lower Walshaw House; 53.60382°N 2.34169°W	—	1779	A brick house with moulded eaves and a slate roof. There are two storeys and a symmetrical front of five bays. On the ground floor is a central porch with fluted Ionic columns and a dentilled cornice, and the windows are sashes.	II
St Anne's Church; 53.61583°N 2.34102°W		1799	A rectangular and plain church in Classical style, it is in stone with quoins and two storeys. The entrance front is gabled with a bellcote and clock face, and it contains two arched doorways with Tuscan pilasters, a cornice-pediment, and fanlights. Above the doorways are arched windows with jambs, imposts and keystones. There are two tiers of similar windows along the sides, and at the west end is an inserted Gothic window.	II
St Anne's Vicarage; 53.61618°N 2.34102°W	—	Early 19th century	The vicarage is in stone with two storeys at the front and three at the rear, cellars and attics, and a front of three bays. In the centre is a round-headed window with a traceried fanlight and an open pediment. The windows are sashes, and at the rear is a round-headed stair window. On the gable end facing the road are buttresses and quoins.	II
Tottington Hall; 53.61285°N 2.34034°W		Early 19th century	A stone house, later used as a library, with a sill band, a hipped slate roof, two storeys, and a symmetrical front of five bays. The doorway has plain half-columns, a cornice hood, and a fanlight, and the windows are sashes.	II
Barn to east of cruck barn, Brandlesholme Old Hall; 53.61506°N 2.32195°W	—	c. 1830 (probable)	The barn is in stone with quoins and a stone slab roof. It is a long building, with a two-storey section to the west. The barn contains a square-headed vehicle entrance, doorways, windows with pointed heads, and keyhole-shaped ventilation slits.	II
Lock-up; 53.61494°N 2.34262°W		1835	The village lock-up is in deeply rusticated stone, and has a roof of large stone blocks with a central vent, a grilled door, and a knocker in a lion's mouth. Some of the stones are carved with faces, crossed bones, and a key.	II
National School; 53.61549°N 2.34097°W	—	1835	The school, later used as a parish hall, is in stone, and consists of a simple rectangular building. The windows and doorways are round-headed and are in plain architraves.	II
Garden folly, Nabb's House; 53.62264°N 2.33214°W	—	c. 1835 (probable)	The folly is in stone and in Gothic style, with features resembling a miniature castle, and a choir. It has an arcaded front, and twin circular turrets. There are rusticated walls along three sides and pseudo-primitive carved heads and figures.	II
Yard wall, Nabb's House; 53.62294°N 2.33289°W	—	c. 1835 (probable)	A folly wall in rusticated stone with rounded coping. It is about 15 feet (4.6 m) high, and contains three mock gun ports with wooden doors.	II
Barn, Farnworth Hall Farm; 53.62760°N 2.37702°W	—	1852	The barn is in stone and has three bays. The doorways are surrounded by blocks forming jamb quoins, voussoirs or lintels, and each block is decorated with pseudo-primitive carvings, including faces, animals, patterns, and vermiculation, and one quoin has the date. There are also windows and keyhole-shaped ventilation slits.	II
St John's Church; 53.61418°N 2.34011°W		1853	The portico was added in 1867, and the chancel in 1909–10. The church is in gritstone, and has a slate roof with coped gables. It consists of a nave with a short chancel, a boiler house and a vestry. At the entrance front is a portico with four moulded columns, an entablature and a pediment, behind which are paired doorways with flat lintels. Above the portico is a stepped three-light window and a datestone, and on the apex of the gable is a bellcote with moulded coping and scrolled brackets.	II
Congregational Chapel, Greenmount; 53.62529°N 2.33824°W		1865–1867	Later a United Reformed Church, the church is in stone with a slate roof, and is in Early English style. It consists of a nave, north and south aisles, a chancel-like extension at the east end, a southeast octagonal chapel, and a southwest steeple. The steeple has a tower and a spire with lucarnes.	II
Boundary wall, Wesleyan School; 53.61401°N 2.34184°W	—	1868	The wall was altered in about 1905 to incorporate the datestone of a chapel that had been demolished. The wall extends for about 25 metres (82 ft) along the eastern boundary. It is built in stone slabs with a stone coping, and contains two pairs of gate piers. Each pier is a monolith in gritstone, about 2 metres (6 ft 7 in) high with a square plan, moulded copings, and a plain cap. The gates are in wrought iron.	II
Wesleyan day and Sunday school 53.61390°N 2.34172°W	—	1868	The former school, later converted for residential use, is in gritstone on an ashlar plinth, and has corner pilasters on the front, quoins at the rear, and a grey slate roof with coped gables. There are two storeys, four bays at the front, and seven bays on the sides. On the entrance front is a pedimented gable with a datestone, and a single-storey projecting porch with a moulded round-arched entrance, corner pilasters, moulded eaves, and a flat roof. The windows are segmental-headed sashes with keystones; the windows in the front have moulded architraves, and along the sides they have plain surrounds.	II
Christ Church, Walshaw; 53.60021°N 2.33909°W		1888	The church was designed by Maxwell and Tuke, the steeple was added in 1913, and the church is in Gothic Revival style. It is in stone, and consists of a large nave with passage aisles, small north and south transepts, a long chancel, and a southwest steeple. The steeple has a tower with corner pinnacles, and a recessed spire.	II*
Methodist Church; 53.61375°N 2.34103°W		1905	The church, which has Gothic and Art Nouveau features, is in gritstone and has a slate roof with coped gables and terracotta cresting. The church consists of a nave and a chancel, and has an entrance flanked by bays with hipped roofs, and the entrance itself has stepped buttresses that rise to octagonal shafts with tapering finials. On the roof are four ventilators.	II
Boundary wall, Spring Street Methodist Church; 53.61390°N 2.34092°W	—	Undated	The walls run along the south, east and north sides of the churchyard. They are in gritstone with ashlar coping. The gate piers are square, with pedimented caps. The railings and gates are in wrought iron, and are elaborate with Art Nouveau features.	II
