= Richard Ashworth (headmaster) =

English headteacher (1900–1928)

- Born: 16 April 1869; Tottington, Lancashire
- Died: 25 December 1928 (aged 59); Porthcawl, Wales
- Burial place: Edmonton Cemetery
- Education: University of London (B.A.)
- Occupation: Headteacher
- Years active: 1887–1928
- Known for: First headmaster of The Latymer School on Haselbury Road
- Spouse: Caroline Lydia Joscelyne

Signature
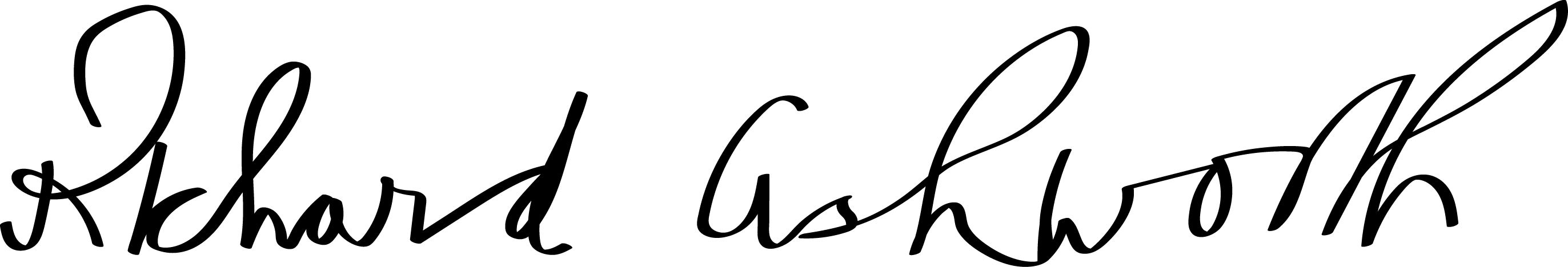

Richard Ashworth (16 April 1869–25 December 1928) was an English headmaster, known for his role as the headmaster of The Latymer School when that school underwent major change on moving to new buildings on Haselbury Road in Edmonton, London, from 1910 to 1928. Beginning his career as a teacher in Tottenham, he led several schools, including the Tottenham Pupil Teachers' Centre, before overseeing the growth of Latymer from a small institution into a major secondary school. Ashworth was also a prominent figure in local civic life, known for his activism in the Liberal Party and his public lectures on social reform.

== Early life and education ==
Richard Ashworth was born on 16 April 1869 in Tottington, a village near Bury in south Lancashire. He grew up in an industrial area that was recovering from the economic difficulties caused by the American Civil War and the subsequent cotton famine. His father, Robert Ashworth, worked as a calico printer and part-time farmer, while his mother, Alice Eliza Ashworth (nee Coop), was a power-loom weaver. He had two younger siblings, a brother named Joseph, born in 1871, and a sister named Lilian, born in 1877.

Family history played a significant role in shaping Ashworth's later political views; a close associate noted that Ashworth frequently spoke of the Peterloo Massacre of 1819, where a relative had sustained injuries that eventually proved fatal. This family tragedy was cited as the root of his "ardent" support for political reform."

Ashworth's early education is not well-documented, but at the age of twelve, he attended the New Jerusalem School in Ramsbottom, run by the Swedenborgian Society. The school focused on subjects like mathematics and science, which Ashworth pursued with interest.

Homerton College student register entry for Ashworth, showing his subjects and examination results.

At sixteen, following the death of his grandfather, Ashworth received a modest inheritance which helped support his further education. He worked as a pupil-teacher while continuing his academic studies in subjects such as mathematics, chemistry, and physics. In 1887, he won a Queen's Scholarship (placing in the First Class, ranked 244th nationally) to Homerton College, then a mixed teacher training college located in Homerton, East London.

The college register records that he achieved First Division standing in his 1888 Certificate Examination, alongside a Drawing ('D') qualification. He focused heavily on the sciences, taking examination passes in sound, light and heat (advanced second class), electricity, physiology, theoretical and practical chemistry, and first-stage mathematics. He completed his two-year training course at Homerton in 1889 with first-class honours.

== Career ==
=== Tottenham ===
Rather than returning to Lancashire after finishing at Homerton, Ashworth decided to remain in London, beginning his teaching career in Tottenham. He first held a probationary post at Seven Sisters School, a typical "board school" with separate departments for infants, girls, and boys. Shortly after, on 7 July 1890, Ashworth secured a formal appointment as an Assistant Master at Noel Park Boys' School. The selection process was highly competitive; the board minutes record that Ashworth was selected only after three rounds of balloting by the board members, eventually securing the post with an annual salary of £70.

In 1892, at the age of twenty-three and still on probation, he was promoted to second master of the boys' department at the Lancastrian School, a large institution in one of Tottenham's poorest areas. The school faced severe challenges, including extreme poverty, high truancy rates, and frequent epidemics of scarlet fever and smallpox. Despite these difficulties, Ashworth became known for his dedication and was noted for his ability to maintain discipline and improve attendance, frequently deputising for the headmaster. During this period, he concluded his probationary teaching service with the formal award of his government parchment in February 1894, while continuing his academic studies in his spare time, completing an external B.A. from the University of London in 1899.

In 1900, Ashworth was appointed headmaster of Woodlands Park Boys' School in Tottenham. Under his leadership, the school saw rapid growth, with the number of students increasing significantly. Ashworth's management and teaching methods were praised in annual inspections, and the school's success reflected his effective organisation, enthusiasm, and commitment to both his staff and students.

In February 1904, following a ballot of seven candidates, Ashworth was appointed Principal of the Tottenham Pupil Teachers' Centre, succeeding the late Mr. T. E. Margerison. Upon his departure from Woodlands Park to take up the role, his staff presented him with a silver tea and coffee service; the second master, Mr. Emery, noted that the staff 'could not have had a more considerate' headmaster. Under his care, the Centre expanded rapidly, and its students achieved the highest percentage of success in the preliminary examinations in the country. However, the educational philosophy shifted, leading to the proposal for the abolition of such centres. The Tottenham Centre was closed down in July 1910. The official note marking its closure included a tribute to Ashworth's work.

=== The Latymer School, Edmonton (1910–1928) ===
==== Appointment and early role ====
The original staff of Latymer School, c. 1910. Ashworth is seated in the centre.

Ashworth was appointed headmaster on 22 May 1910, at the Guildhall, Westminster. He secured the post against considerable opposition, only succeeding on the third ballot.

The new school building, intended initially for 150 pupils, opened on 26 September 1910, with 27 pupils ranging in age from 9 to 18. Eleven pupils held scholarships (including two from Essex), and seventeen paid fees. Ashworth's first monthly report, dated 18 October 1910, noted that the standard of admission must be "seriously raised," replacing an erased remark stating "The pupils are bright" with the more cautious appraisal, "The pupils on the whole are hopeful material." He appointed key staff, including Jano Davies (future wife of Liberal Party leader Clement Davies) as Senior Mistress and James North as Senior Master, and praised their abilities and zeal in his early reports. He also introduced the Latin motto Qui Patitur Vincit ("He who is willing to endure, in the end, conquers.").

==== Growth and wartime impact ====
Under Ashworth, the school grew from its small beginnings. He implemented strategies to increase enrolment, including the introduction of a preparatory department for younger pupils (ages 8–10) and offering financial assistance (scholarships, maintenance grants) and school meals. Ashworth was acutely aware of Latymer's inadequate science facilities and the time pupils wasted commuting to the Technical Institute for lessons, which fuelled his push for school expansion. By December 1912, enrolment was approaching the initial capacity of 150, and by 1913, the school was full.

The outbreak of World War I in 1914 impacted the school under Ashworth's direction. Male staff enlistments led to replacements by women teachers. The school faced acute overcrowding as pupil numbers rose significantly, reaching 268 by September 1917 and 289 by October 1918. Despite these challenges, Ashworth guided the school community in extensive philanthropic activities during the war, raising money and entertaining soldiers, driven by his aim of fostering character through altruism. He also used the war context to publicly advocate for his liberal educational views, arguing against lowering the school leaving age and promoting character formation over vocational training. He consistently sought salary increases for his overworked staff throughout the war, though applications were sometimes vetoed by the Middlesex Education Committee.

==== Post-war development and administrative struggles ====
Edmonton Latymer School staff in 1926, many of whom were friends and pupils of Ashworth previously

Post-war, the demand for places continued to grow due to the school's increasing academic successes. In 1924, Ashworth and the school's governors were involved in a significant administrative debate regarding a proposed £14,677 extension. While the Board of Education favoured using Latymer Foundation charity funds for the construction, the governors argued that these funds should be reserved for student scholarships and maintenance rather than building costs, which they believed were the responsibility of the County Council. Despite these disputes, Ashworth continued to push for expansion. In February 1925, during the school's tercentenary celebrations, he presided over a dinner for old students at the Holborn Restaurant, where he defended the decision to increase the school's capacity to 900 pupils to meet the growing educational needs of the district.

Duke and Duchess visit The Latymer School (27 October 1928)

The culmination of Ashworth's career and his efforts to expand the school was realised on 27 October 1928, with the official opening of the new extensions by the Duke and Duchess of York. The project, which included a new Great Hall with accommodation for over 1,000 people, cost approximately £67,000 and was the first visit by royalty to an Edmonton civic function in many years. The event was of such scale that an estimated 20,000 people lined the streets, standing twenty deep in places along Fore Street and Haselbury Road, to witness the royal motor-car pass through lanes of "cheering humanity." Ashworth, alongside Major W. Richard, was the primary official responsible for the general arrangements of the day, which included a guard of honour formed by 120 members of the British Legion and the Silver Prize Band.

During the ceremony in the new hall, the Duke delivered a speech advocating for an "interchange of ideas on educational matters" across the British Empire. At the conclusion of his address, the Duke requested that Ashworth grant the pupils a whole holiday to commemorate the event. Ashworth later confided to the Vicar of Edmonton that the day was the "grandest day in his life," though the immense physical and mental strain of organising such a massive undertaking was believed by his colleagues to have significantly weakened him.

The rapid growth and changing economic conditions resulted in a more diverse student body, including many from poorer backgrounds unable to stay for the full course. Ashworth noted that this influx of "raw juniors" and fewer "seniors" presented challenges to maintaining the school's academic profile and tone in later reports. He faced criticism from rival schools in Edmonton and encountered difficulties with the Middlesex Education Committee regarding funding for resources and perceived administrative pressures. Ashworth, described as not primarily an organiser, increasingly relied on his deputy, James North, to manage the administrative complexities of the large institution, finding his methods suited for a small school inadequate for the larger one. The strain of managing the school's rapid growth and administrative pressures was significant, contributing to his declining health; he had experienced a nervous breakdown around 1920.

== Philosophy and leadership style ==
Ashworth’s leadership was defined by a philosophy that prioritised character formation and social responsibility over purely vocational training. He argued that education should prepare students for "life itself" rather than just a livelihood, defining an educated person as one possessing "knowledge, imagination, sympathy, tolerance, powers of suspending judgment, the habit of work, and a philosophy of life." He championed subjects like English literature as essential for developing the "whole personality" with a view toward offering "perfect service to God and man."

Throughout his headship, Ashworth maintained an active presence in the classroom, teaching French (which he taught out of a passion for its sounds) and history. A dedicated disciple of phonetician Daniel Jones, he was described by colleagues as "fanatical about French pronunciation" and was deeply concerned with the clarity and precision of spoken English, despairing of the open vowels of southern speech. Under his curriculum, new pupils often spent an entire opening term exclusively learning phonetics before undertaking the written language itself, and he encouraged teachers to undertake further university training in phonetics. In class, he was remembered for energetic, theatrical methods (such as throwing himself against the wall to dramatise the reflexive verb se blottir contre le mur) and bringing French texts like Alphonse Daudet's Lettres de mon moulin to life. He was known locally for walking through Pymmes Park or riding open-top buses along Fore Street loudly practising French vowel sounds or conversing animatedly with the school's Belgian language assistant, M. Maelstaff, and he arranged for advanced students to attend services at a French church.

This commitment to the "soul of a school" (the character-building activities he believed "escaped computation" beyond academic results) informed his advocacy for Edmonton's working-class families. In 1910, he successfully campaigned for the reduction of school fees to ensure the institution remained accessible to poorer parents. Having no children of his own, Ashworth regarded his pupils as his "special charge," often prioritising their individual welfare and career guidance over institutional metrics.

At Woodlands Park, he was described as a "most considerate" headmaster, while he praised his subordinates as the "most loyal staff anywhere." Known for a "happy knack of saying the right things at the right time" and affectionately nicknamed "Dickie" by his students, Ashworth maintained a reputation for warmth and personal approachability alongside his professional standing.

== Personal life ==
Ashworth married Caroline Lydia Joselyne, on 2 August 1896, at St Magnus the Martyr church in Lower Thames Street, London, they had met the same year while studying at the University of London. The couple had no children. Caroline supported his work, frequently attending school events and remaining connected to The Latymer School.

In his later years, Ashworth took up golf and driving a motor car, but found both stressful, which colleagues speculated may have contributed to his declining health. In late 1928, likely driven by mounting professional pressures, Ashworth became a Freemason and the first initiate of the Edmonton Latymer Lodge.

== Political views and social activism ==
=== Foundational philosophy and party leadership ===
Ashworth was a prominent figure in the Radical wing of the Liberal Party in North London. His political outlook was informed by his Swedenborgian education and nonconformist faith; in an 1899 address on "Progress," he argued that the "leaven of Christian principles" was the primary driver of social evolution. He was an early advocate of the "Darkest England" scheme proposed by William Booth, maintaining that a "healthy England" required a direct fight against "evil environment and insanitary houses."

By 1900, Ashworth had risen to become the Secretary of the Tottenham Liberal and Radical Union. His dual role as a political leader and educator occasionally invited public scrutiny; his appointment as headmaster of Woodlands Park School in 1900 was the subject of a public controversy in the local press.

=== Parliamentary agency and Irish Home Rule ===
Ashworth's political influence extended into parliamentary affairs. He served as the political agent for the prominent reformer Sir Percy Alden, M.P., managing local operations during the Liberal landslide of 1906. He was an active supporter of the Parliament Act 1911, which sought to curb the power of the House of Lords, and he drafted resolutions on behalf of the Tottenham and Wood Green Liberal Federation praising the legislation as a victory for "the democratic power of the people."

In July 1914, Ashworth shared a platform with William Redmond, M.P., during a mass meeting in support of Irish Home Rule. Seconding a motion in favour of the Home Rule Bill, Ashworth described the Unionist opposition as a "rampart" erected by "reactionary opponents" to obstruct domestic progress on social issues affecting "health and home."

=== Educational and economic reform ===
Ashworth utilised the Pleasant Sunday Afternoon movement to campaign for systemic economic changes. Drawing on the research of Seebohm Rowntree, he delivered a series of lectures titled "Poverty: a Study of Town Life," where he utilized detailed statistics to argue that chronic poverty was largely a result of low wages rather than individual "improvidence."

He was particularly vocal in his opposition to the Education Act 1902, characterising it as a "clericalising and sterilising" measure that subsidised religious schools with public funds without ensuring adequate public representation. He further argued for the reform of the local education rate, maintaining that the "unequal incidence" of the rate placed an unfair financial burden on populous, working-class districts like Tottenham.

Ashworth was also known for his personal philanthropy; in 1914, he cooked a hot dinner for 153 of the poorest children in South Tottenham free of charge and provided a horse and cart to transport the requisites for the event. He was also a supporter of the temperance movement; in 1916, his name appeared on a 'grave appeal' to the Cabinet calling for the prohibition of alcohol during the war effort.

=== Views on suffrage and internationalism ===
Ashworth’s relationship with women’s political rights underwent a documented transformation. In 1906, he spoke dismissively of the militant Suffragettes, suggesting their movement was more concerned with "motor-cars" than genuine reform and expressing "amusement" at their tactics. However, his later career was marked by close cooperation with female political bodies. By the time of his death, he had established a firm alliance with the North Tottenham Women's Liberal Association, which sent a formal floral tribute to his funeral and participated in the representative mourning for him.

In the final decade of his life, Ashworth focused increasingly on internationalism and the peace movement. His views had been expressed during the First World War, when, at a 1916 National Union of Teachers meeting of local educators held at Croyland Road School, he argued that Germany should receive fair treatment after the war. Ashworth maintained that lasting European peace could not be achieved through punitive measures, but through reconciliation and the development and rebuilding of Germany's educational system. This position, which advocated cooperation with a wartime enemy, was unpopular at the time and attracted local opposition.

Following the war, Ashworth became Chairman of the Edmonton Branch of the League of Nations Union, becoming an advocate of international cooperation to address what he described as the "shattered civilization" left by the First World War. He frequently lectured on the "Futility of War", promoting international arbitration, democratic values, and a society that prioritised the "culture of the soul" over military preparation. His internationalism was closely connected to his belief in education as a means of promoting peace and preventing future conflict.

== Death and funeral ==
The announcement of Ashworth's death and a portrait published in the Tottenham & Edmonton Weekly Herald, 28 December 1928

In December 1928, accompanied by his wife, Ashworth travelled to Porthcawl, Wales, for the Christmas holidays. He departed London on Thursday, 20 December, but contracted a chill during the train journey. Already in a "generally run down condition" due to professional overwork, his health deteriorated rapidly upon arrival. He died of pneumonia on Christmas Day.

The funeral took place on Monday, 31 December 1928. The service began at All Saints' Church, Edmonton, which was described as crowded, with pupils of the Latymer School occupying the north and south aisles. Interment followed at Edmonton Cemetery. Contemporary reports noted that despite a "bitterly cold wind," a representative gathering of several hundred people stood at the graveside.

The chief mourners were led by his widow, Caroline, his sister Lilian, and extended family members. The public attendance included significant figures from local government and education, including the Members of Parliament for Edmonton (Frank Broad) and North Tottenham (Robert Morrison), alongside County Councillor Darlington (Chairman of the Middlesex Higher Education Committee) and Sir Benjamin Gott. The school staff were represented by Senior English Master Arthur Gibbs and Senior Mistress Dorothy Abbott; the Senior Assistant Master, James North, was unable to attend.

In the weeks following his death, tributes were paid from local pulpits and in the press, with the school described as being "in mourning." A memorial service was held in the newly opened Great Hall upon the pupils' return from the Christmas holidays. During the service, the Rev. R. C. Evill, Chairman of the Governors, said that Ashworth had "[given] his life for the School," having worn himself out in its service.

== Legacy ==
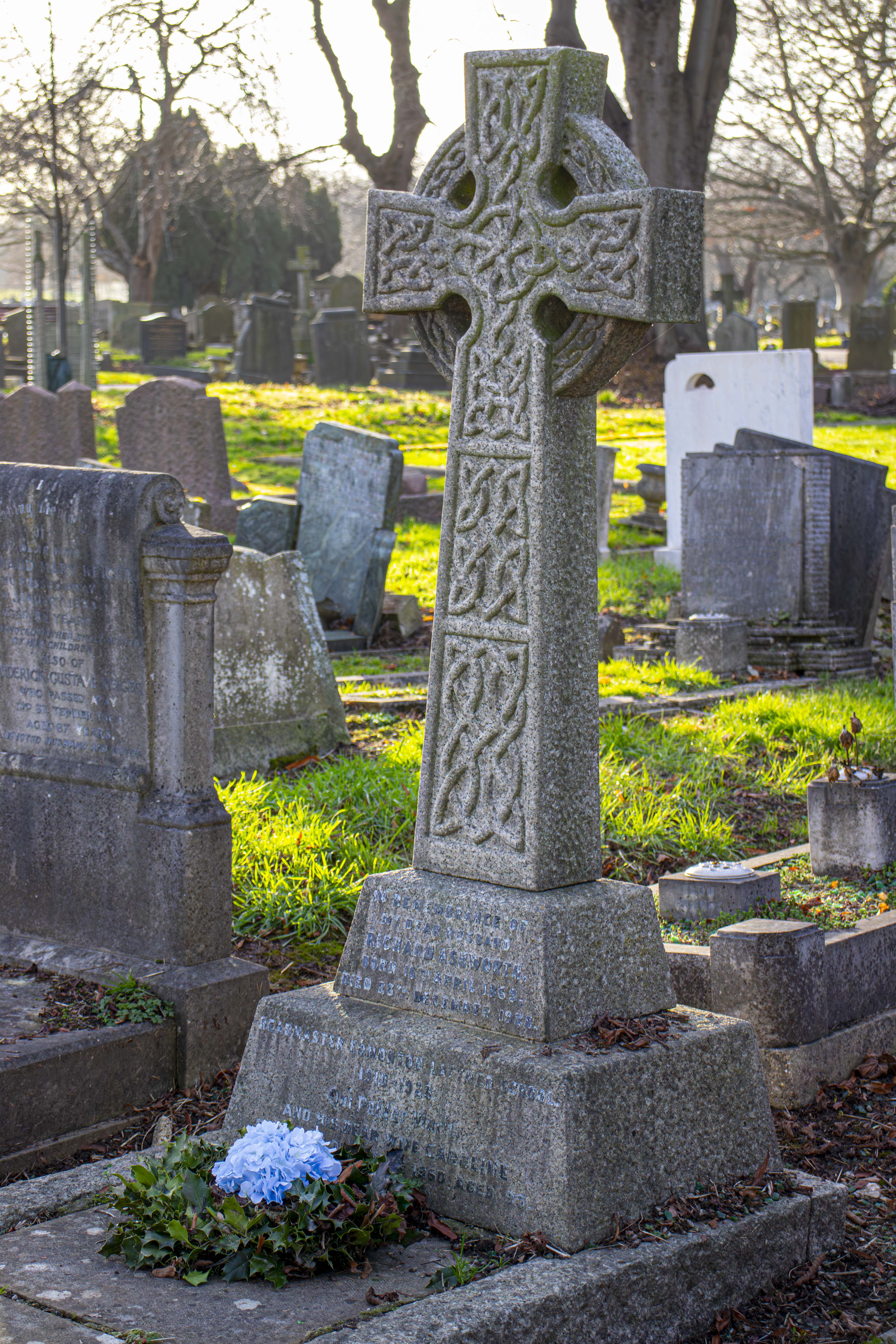
The gravestone of Richard Ashworth, Edmonton Cemetery.

Ashworth's tenure had a significant impact on The Latymer School's development and reputation. His educational philosophy, which emphasised character development alongside academics, became a core part of the school's culture, sometimes referred to as the "Ashworth tradition" or "Latymer spirit." According to school histories and alumni recollections, he was considered a major influence by many former pupils and colleagues. Several staff members who worked under him later became headteachers at other schools influenced by his principles. During his headship, The Latymer School's public standing improved from a new and relatively unknown institution to a respected secondary school within the local community.

His legacy is also associated with the successful establishment of co-education at Latymer and his role in the expansion of secondary education in Middlesex. Following his death, the school magazine published a tribute with a photograph and the inscription: "to live on in the hearts of those we love is not to die."

Ashworth is commemorated at The Latymer School through a house named after him and the Ashworth Memorial Library. His headship is a central focus of Joseph Acton Morris's 1975 book A History of The Latymer School at Edmonton. His impact is further detailed in published collections of student memories, including a volume compiled by Andrew Granath in 1995.

== Bibliography ==
- Morris, Joseph Acton (1975). A History of The Latymer School at Edmonton. The Latymer Foundation at Edmonton. ISBN 978-0-9504862-0-8.
- Granath, Andrew (1995). Latymer Remembered Memories Of Latymer School 1882 - 1945. The Latymer Foundation at Edmonton. ISBN 0950541524.
