= Christ Church, Walshaw =

Listed church in Greater Manchester, England

Coordinates: 53.600251°N 2.339052°W

Parish of Christ Church, Walshaw
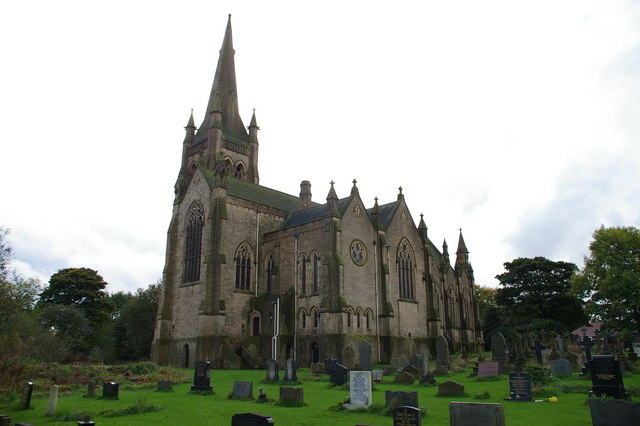
- Christ Church from the South West

- Location in Greater Manchester
- OS grid reference: SD 775,116
- Location: High St, Walshaw; Greater Manchester, England
- Denomination: Anglican
- Churchmanship: Evangelical
- Website: Christ Church, Walshaw

History
- Status: Parish church

Architecture
- Functional status: Active
- Heritage designation: Grade II*
- Designated: 29 January 1985
- Architect: Lawrence Booth
- Architectural type: Church
- Style: Gothic Revival
- Years built: 1888
- Construction cost: £20,000

Administration
- Province: York
- Diocese: Manchester
- Archdeaconry: Bolton
- Deanery: Bury
- Parish: Christ Church, Walshaw

Christ Church is an active church community on High Street in Walshaw, a village within the Metropolitan Borough of Bury Greater Manchester, England. Designed in the Gothic Revival style by Lawrence Booth in 1888, the building was funded by Rev John Gorrell Haworth and Miss Nancy Haworth, and took four years to complete. It was erected as a memorial to Manchester cotton and fustian manufacturer Jesse Haworth, as noted prominently across the west facade of the building. The church is a Grade II* listed building.

The church is large, with an especially wide nave and has an "admirable" steeple at its southeast corner, visible from the town of Bury in the valley below. The nave is crossed by two broad transepts, each two bays wide. Interior columns are of granite with shaft rings and in places the arcades feature double rows of columns. The windows are in the Gothic style but, as Pevsner notes, they have "un-Gothic transoms."

Internally, the church features a fine circular font, encrusted with stiff-leaf decoration.

The churchyard contains war graves of three soldiers and two airmen of World War II.

Christ Church has connections with the local community, including the church primary school and the local day nursery, and actively supports local voluntary secular and Christian mission agencies including Porch Boxes food bank, Bury Street Pastors, and Bury's CAP Debt Centre. The parish also engages in national and international ministry through its support and partnership with 'Tearfund', the 'Bible Society', 'Compassion' and 'The Bury Project: Christians Against Poverty'.

== See also ==
- Grade II* listed buildings in Greater Manchester
- List of churches in Greater Manchester
- Listed buildings in Tottington, Greater Manchester
