= Tottington Hall =

Municipal building in Tottington, Greater Manchester, England

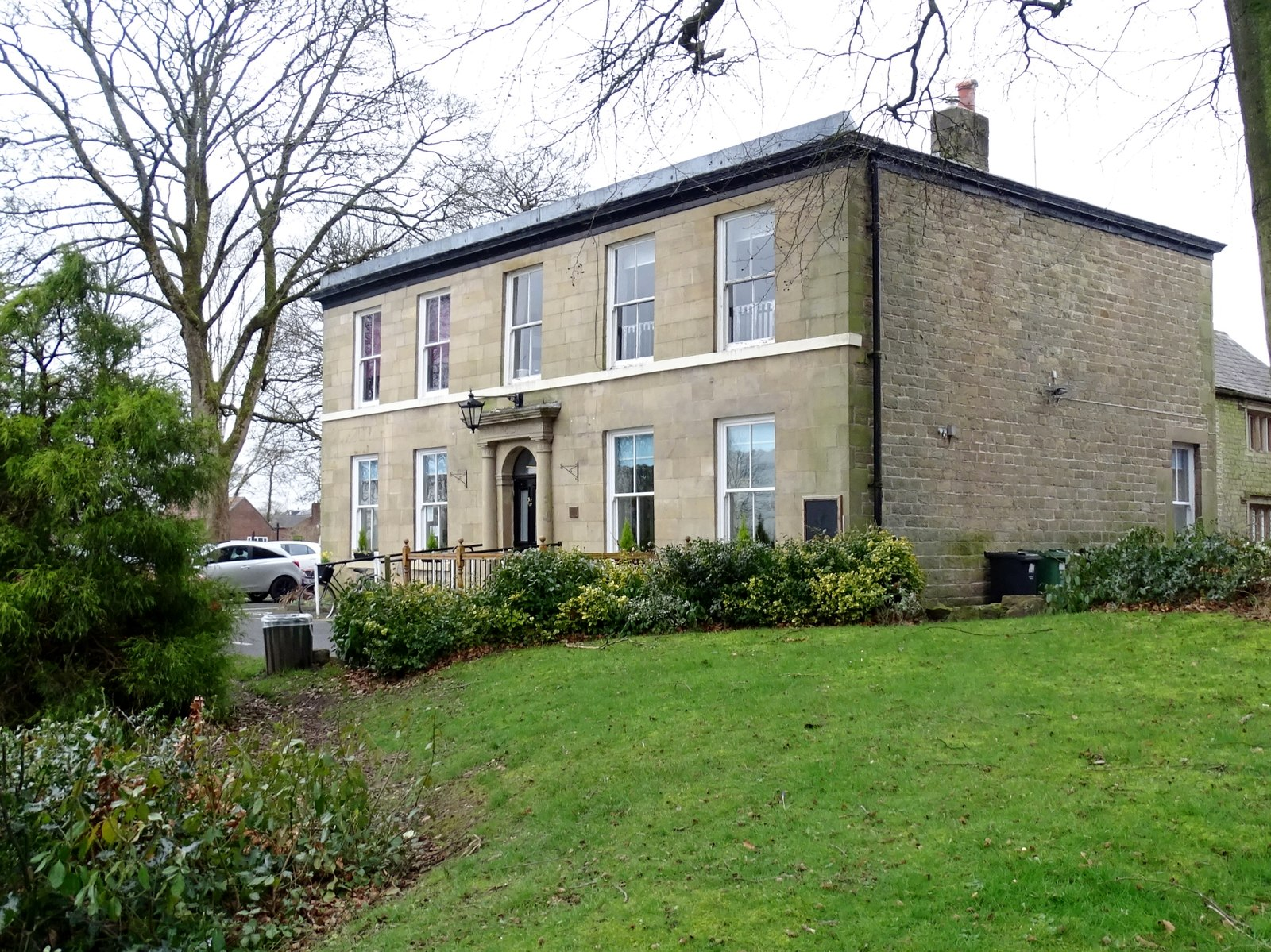
- The building in 2020

- Shown in Greater Manchester
- 53.6128°N 2.3404°W
- Location: Market Street, Tottington

History
- Built: c.1820

Site notes
- Architectural style: Neoclassical style

Listed Building – Grade II
- Official name: Tottington Hall
- Designated: 5 October 1982
- Reference no.: 1163648

Tottington Hall, also known as Tottington Town Hall, is a municipal building in Market Street, Tottington, a town in Greater Manchester in England. The building, which served as the offices and meeting place of Tottington Urban District Council and now operates as a public library, is a grade II listed building.

== History ==
The original building on the site was a private house, commissioned for a branch of the Notogh family, later known as the Nuttall family, which dated back to around 1504. After Thomas Nuttall died without descendants in 1727, his executors did much to expand and consolidate the estate. The house was subsequently occupied by the Wood family who were proprietors of a local tannery. In 1770, the house was acquired by John Gorton who, through the development of local mills and bleachworks, made a major contribution to the development of the town in the early 19th century.

The house then passed to Thomas Gorton, who had it refurbished and re-modelled, in around 1820. A whole new wing was erected on the front of the house facing east towards a newly laid lawn. The new wing was designed in the neoclassical style and was built in ashlar stone. The house was bought by two schoolmasters, James Hainsworth and George Hudson in 1863, and then by the Roberts family in the late 19th century.

In 1918, the house was purchased by Tottington Urban District Council for £2,750, for use as its town hall. A war memorial, designed by Walter Marsden in the form of a Portland stone wall with a simple cross in the centre, which was intended to commemorate the lives of local service personnel who had died in the First World War, was unveiled to the south of the town hall in April 1930.

The town hall continued to serve as the headquarters of the borough council for much of the 20th century, but ceased to be the local seat of government when for the enlarged Bury Borough Council which was formed in 1974. The council subsequently opened a library on the ground floor of the building, while the upper floor was disused. The council announced the closure of the library in 2017, but it was taken over by a voluntary group, which added a tea room, and made two conference rooms upstairs available for hire.

In July 2022, the Town Park Meadow, to the east of the town hall, was renamed Private Peachment VC Town Meadow Park in memory of Private George Peachment of the King's Royal Rifle Corps, who was posthumously awarded the Victoria Cross for his bravery at the Battle of Loos on 25 September 1915. A mural illustrating his life was unveiled at the same time.

== Architecture ==
The two-storey building has been grade II listed since 1982. It is five bays wide, with sash windows and a central door with half columns and a cornice hood. It is built of stone, and has a slate roof. Behind the front wing are the older parts of the complex which include the stables.

== See also ==
- Listed buildings in Tottington, Greater Manchester
