= Brandlesholme Old Hall =

Listed house in Greater Manchester, England

- Location within Greater Manchester
- Alternative names: Brandlesholme Hall

General information
- Type: Private residence
- Architectural style: Vernacular
- Location: Brandlesholme Rd, Brandlesholme, Bury, Greater Manchester, England
- Coordinates: 53.6147°N 2.3225°W
- Construction started: 13th century
- Renovated: 16th century (altered and extended); 1849 (remodelled)

Design and construction
- Designations

Listed Building – Grade II*
- Official name: Brandlesholme Old Hall
- Designated: 29 January 1985
- Reference no.: 1067287

Listed Building – Grade II
- Official name: Cruck barn to north east of Brandlesholme Old Hall
- Designated: 29 January 1985
- Reference no.: 1162937

Listed Building – Grade II
- Official name: Barn to east of cruck barn, north east of Brandlesholme Old Hall
- Designated: 29 January 1985
- Reference no.: 1356791

Brandlesholme Old Hall is a Grade II* listed, privately owned historic house on Brandlesholme Road in Brandlesholme, an area in the town of Bury, Greater Manchester, England. Historically in Lancashire, the building has medieval origins with later additions, and is one of the oldest surviving domestic structures in the borough. It has been associated with several notable local families and remains an important example of vernacular architecture in the Irwell Valley.

== History ==
The hall was owned by the Greenhalgh family for eleven generations. John Greenhalgh (d. 1651) was appointed Governor of the Isle of Man in 1640 by James Stanley, 7th Earl of Derby, and his estates were later seized by parliamentary authorities. On the death of Henry Greenhalgh in 1728, the property passed to the Matthews family, who sold it in the 1770s to the merchant Richard Powell of Heaton Norris, Stockport. The hall was sold at auction in 2018.

== Architecture ==
The building was originally an open-hall cruck-framed house, dating from the 13th century, and was later altered and extended in the 16th century and remodelled in 1849. The south end was dismantled and rebuilt in 1852, and the structure was repaired in 1908. It has 19th-century moulded oriel windows, and the tall 1½-storey range with a steep slate roof contains the medieval hall.

Externally, the house preserves little of its ancient appearance, but the interior retains a substantial amount of its timber construction. The hall preserves its wide open fireplace and contains a broad, well-formed 16th or 17th-century upper cruck frame.

== Associated structures ==
The site also includes a Grade II listed cruck barn from the 16th century and a Grade II listed barn dating from c. 1830.

== See also ==
- Grade II* listed buildings in Greater Manchester
- Listed buildings in Tottington, Greater Manchester
