= 2026 Bury Council election =

2026 English local government election

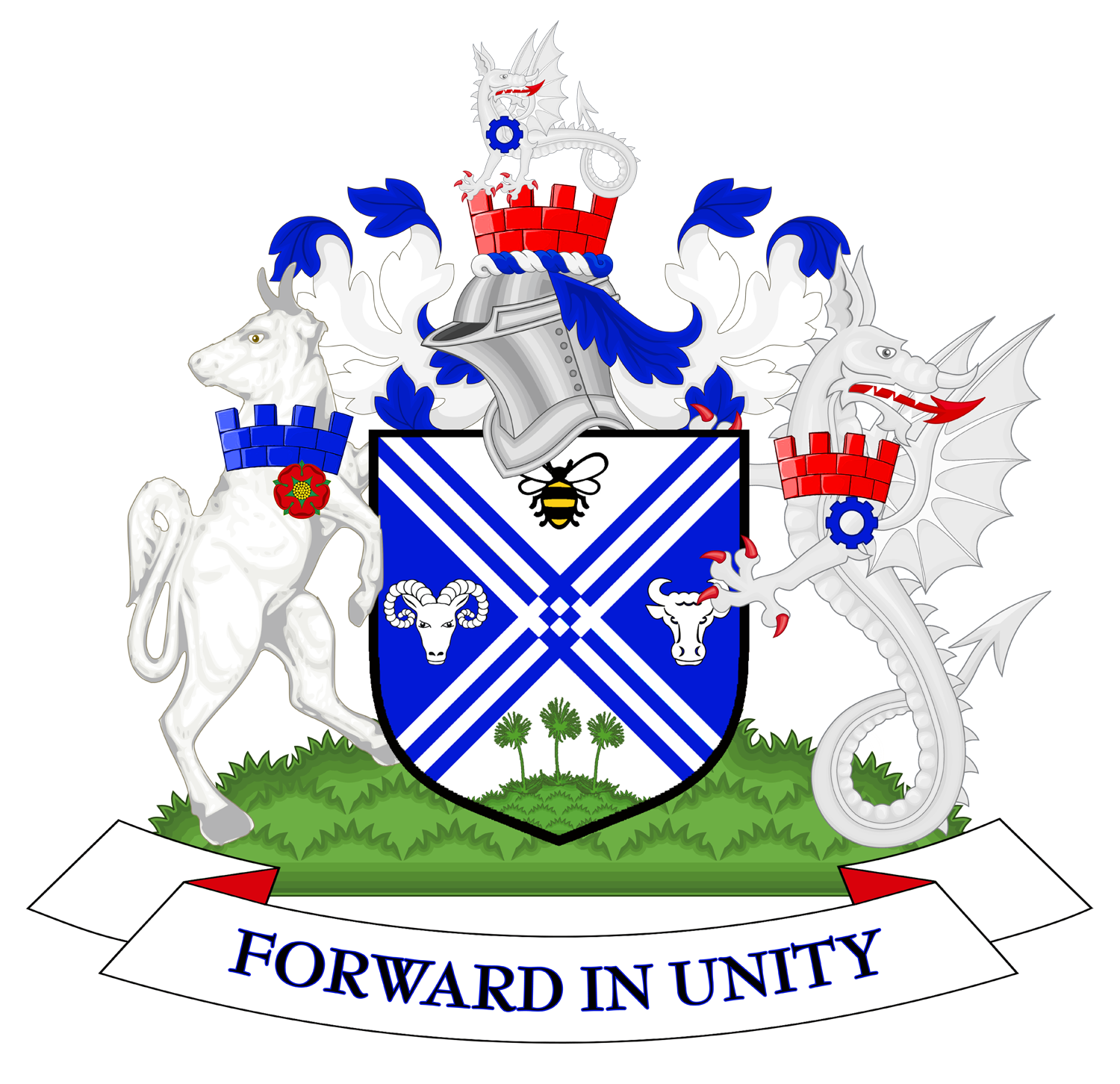
- 7 May 2026

17 out of 51 seats to Bury Council 26 seats needed for a majority
	First party	Second party	Third party
Leader	Eamonn O'Brien	Mike Smith	None
Party	Labour	Radcliffe First	Reform
Leader's seat	St Mary's	Radcliffe West
Last election	32 seats, 45.4%	8 seats, 7.8%	0 seats, 1.0%
Seats before	32	7	3
Seats won	8	2	5
Seats after	31	7	6
Seat change		Steady	▲3
Popular vote	16,012	3,711	18,135
Percentage	26.8%	6.2%	30.4%
Swing	▼18.6pp	▼1.6pp	▲29.4pp
	Fourth party	Fifth party	Sixth party
Leader	Shahbaz Arif	Russell Bernstein
Party	Conservative	Together for Bury	Independent
Leader's seat	Bury West	Pilkington Park
Last election	10 seats, 25.9%	Did not exist	1 seats, 0.4%
Seats before	5	3	1
Seats won	0	0	1
Seats after	3	2	1
Seat change	▼2	▼1	Steady
Popular vote	8,094	595	1,889
Percentage	13.6%	1.0%	3.2%
Swing	▼12.3pp	N/A	▲2.8pp
	Seventh party
Party	Workers Party
Last election	0 seats, 2.9%
Seats before	0
Seats won	1
Seats after	1
Seat change	▲1
Popular vote	1,511
Percentage	2.5%
Swing	▼0.4pp
- Winner of each seat at the 2026 Bury Council election (excluding the delayed poll in Moorside).
Leader before election
Eamonn O'Brien
Labour
Leader after election
Eamonn O'Brien
Labour

The 2026 Bury Council election took place on Thursday 7 May 2026, alongside other local elections in the United Kingdom. One third of the 51 members of Bury Council in Greater Manchester were elected. The election in Moorside ward was postponed to 18 June, following the death of the original Reform UK candidate.

Labour retained its overall majority on the council.

== Council composition ==
After 2024 election		Before 2026 election	
Party	Seats	Party	Seats
Labour	32	Labour	32
Radcliffe First	8	Radcliffe First	7
Conservative	10	Conservative	5
Together for Bury	N/A	Together for Bury	3
Reform	0	Reform	3
Independent	1	Independent	1

Changes 2024–2026:

- June 2025: Russell Bernstein (Conservative, Pilkington Park), Jo Lancaster (Conservative, Radcliffe North & Ainsworth), Luis McBriar (Conservative, Tottington), and Dene Vernon (Conservative, Bury West) leave party to sit as independents
- October 2025: Jack Rydeheard (Conservative) joins Reform
- December 2025: Together for Bury formed – Russell Bernstein (Independent), Jo Lancaster (Independent), Luis McBriar (Independent), and Dene Vernon (Independent) join party
- February 2026:
  - Luis James McBriar (Together for Bury) resigns – by-election held April 2026
  - Glyn Marsden (Radcliffe First) joins Reform
- April 2026: George Martin (Reform) gains by-election from Conservatives

== Summary ==
=== Background ===
Bury Metropolitan Borough Council was created in 1974. The Conservatives controlled the council until 1986, when Labour formed their first majority on the council. Following a period of no overall control beginning in 2006, the Conservatives formed a majority in 2008, but this was lost at the next election. Labour retook majority control in 2011 and have formed majority administrations since. Labour expanded their majority in 2024 by gaining one seat from the Conservatives.

Following the 2024 election, the Conservative group faced internal difficulties. Conservative group leader Russell Bernstein was deselected and faced disciplinary measures by the party. Bernstein and three other councillors left the party to form Together for Bury, which was registered in December 2025.

A new set of ward boundaries was used for the 2022 election. This election will be for the councillors elected with the highest number of votes in each of the seventeen three-member wards. Labour are defending nine seats, the Conservatives are defending four, Radcliffe First are defending three, and independents are defending one.

=== Election result ===
2026 Bury Metropolitan Borough Council election
Party	This election				Full council			This election		
Party	Candidates	Seats	Net	Seats %	Other	Total	Total %	Votes	Votes %	+/−
Labour	{{{candidates}}}	8	▼1	47.1	23	31	60.8	17,320	27.5	▼17.9
Radcliffe First	{{{candidates}}}	2	Steady	11.8	5	7	13.7	3,711	5.9	▼1.9
Reform	{{{candidates}}}	5	▲3	29.4	1	6	11.8	19,165	30.4	▲29.4
Conservative	{{{candidates}}}	0	▼2	0.0	3	3	5.9	8,203	13.0	▼12.9
Together for Bury	{{{candidates}}}	0	▼1	0.0	2	2	3.9	595	0.9	N/A
Independent	{{{candidates}}}	1	Steady	5.9	0	1	2.0	1,889	3.0	▲2.6
Workers Party	{{{candidates}}}	1	▲1	5.9	0	1	2.0	2,120	3.4	▲0.5
Green	{{{candidates}}}	0	Steady	0.0	0	0	0.0	8,204	13.0	▲10.3
Bury Independents	{{{candidates}}}	0	Steady	0.0	0	0	0.0	1,506	2.4	▼6.0
English Democrat	{{{candidates}}}	0	Steady	0.0	0	0	0.0	145	0.2	▼0.4
Liberal Democrats	{{{candidates}}}	0	Steady	0.0	0	0	0.0	119	0.2	▼3.6
Communist	{{{candidates}}}	0	Steady	0.0	0	0	0.0	33	0.1	N/A

== Incumbents ==
Ward	Incumbent councillor	Party	Re-standing
Besses	Noel Bayley	Labour	Yes
Bury East	Ayesha Arif	Labour	Yes
Bury West	Jackie Harris	Conservative	Yes
Elton	Jack Rydeheard (Note: Originally elected as a Conservative, but defected to Reform in October 2025.)	Reform	Yes
Holyrood	Elliot Moss	Labour	No
Moorside	Sandra Walmsley	Labour	Yes
North Manor	Roger Brown	Conservative	Yes
Pilkington Park	Russell Bernstein (Note: Originally elected as a Conservative, but subsequently left the party to sit as an independent in June 2025. In December 2025, he co-founded a new party, Together for Bury.)	Together for Bury	Yes
Radcliffe East	Carol Birchmore	Radcliffe First	Yes
Radcliffe North & Ainsworth	Donald Berry	Radcliffe First	Yes
Radcliffe West	Glyn Marsden (Note: Originally elected as Radcliffe First, but later defected to Reform.)	Reform	Yes
Ramsbottom	Clare Cummins	Labour	No
Redvales	Nikki Frith	Labour	Yes
Sedgley	Richard Gold	Labour	Yes
St Mary's	Eamonn O'Brien	Labour	Yes
Tottington	Yvonne Wright	Independent	Yes
Unsworth	Joan Grimshaw	Labour	No

== Ward results ==
=== Besses ===
Besses
Party	Candidate	Votes	%	±%
Labour	Noel Bayley*	1,130	34.9	−28.2
Reform	Elizabeth Clark	1,028	31.8	N/A
Green	Tom Gray	567	17.5	N/A
Conservative	Pat Grant	246	7.6	−4.0
Bury Independents	Martyn West	213	6.6	−9.5
English Democrat	Stephen Morris	50	1.5	−6.7
Majority		102	3.1	−43.9
Rejected ballots		8	0.2	N/A
Turnout		3,234	40.0	+11.0
Registered electors		~8,085		
Labour hold				

=== Bury East ===
Bury East
Party	Candidate	Votes	%	±%
Labour	Ayesha Arif	1,051	33.8	−3.6
Reform	Nick Haslam	916	29.5	+18.2
Green	Maisie Cunningham	509	16.4	N/A
Workers Party	Bilal Zahoor	439	14.1	−1.7
Conservative	Hasan Rahman	193	6.2	−6.4
Majority		135	4.3	−14.9
Rejected ballots		15	0.5	N/A
Turnout		3,108	35.0	+6.0
Registered electors		~8,880		
Labour hold		Swing	▼10.9	

=== Bury West ===
Bury West
Party	Candidate	Votes	%	±%
Reform	David Hill	1,449	34.7	N/A
Conservative	Jackie Harris*	1,306	31.3	−16.4
Labour	Helen Varnom	685	16.4	−21.3
Green	Elle Riley	530	12.7	N/A
Together for Bury	Carol Bernstein	204	4.9	N/A
Majority		143	3.4	N/A
Rejected ballots		12	0.3	N/A
Turnout		4,174	50.0	+10.0
Registered electors		~8,348		
Reform gain from Conservative				

=== Elton ===
Elton
Party	Candidate	Votes	%	±%
Reform	Jack Rydeheard*	1,619	40.7	N/A
Labour	James Ferguson	1,103	27.8	−17.7
Green	Gary Kirkley	485	12.2	N/A
Conservative	Mazhar Aslam	469	11.8	−29.5
Bury Independents	Michael Hankey	298	7.5	−5.1
Majority		516	12.9	N/A
Rejected ballots		22	0.6	N/A
Turnout		3,974	45.0	+6.0
Registered electors		~8,831		
Reform hold				

=== Holyrood ===
Holyrood
Party	Candidate	Votes	%	±%
Labour	Adnan Chaudhry	1,485	36.8	−8.1
Reform	David Silbiger	1,090	27.0	N/A
Green	Peter Curati	1,011	25.1	+17.8
Conservative	Ray Grant	353	8.8	+4.1
English Democrat	Valerie Morris	95	2.4	−1.4
Majority		395	9.8	+3.5
Rejected ballots		0	0.0	N/A
Turnout		4,034	48.0	+5.0
Registered electors		~8,404		
Labour hold				

=== Moorside ===
The election for this ward was cancelled on 15 April 2026 following the death of Reform candidate Victor Hagan. A new election was held on 18 June 2026.

Moorside
Party	Candidate	Votes	%	±%
Labour	Sandra Walmsley*	1,308	39.4	−4.0
Reform	Alan Derby	1,030	31.1	N/A
Workers Party	Aamer Yasin	609	18.4	N/A
Green	Conor William Craig Priestley	200	6.0	N/A
Conservative	Jihyun Park	108	3.3	−21.2
Bury Independents	Jill Budgen	61	1.8	−29.2
Rejected ballots		12		
Turnout		3,328	39	−7
Labour hold				

=== North Manor ===
North Manor
Party	Candidate	Votes	%	±%
Labour	Julie Southworth	1,563	35.4	−10.1
Reform	Mike Hankins	1,308	29.6	N/A
Conservative	Roger Brown	1,182	26.7	−17.8
Green	Charlie Allen	370	8.4	+1.9
Majority		257	5.8	+4.8
Rejected ballots		14	0.3	N/A
Turnout		4,425	55.0	+5.0
Registered electors		~8,045		
Labour gain from Conservative				

=== Pilkington Park ===
Pilkington Park
Party	Candidate	Votes	%	±%
Reform	Shadman Zaman	1,345	34.3	+26.9
Labour	John Mallon	987	25.2	−28.3
Conservative	Peter Freeman	703	18.0	−13.3
Green	John Fitzpatrick	525	13.4	N/A
Together for Bury	Russell Bernstein	342	8.7	N/A
Communist	Dan Ross	14	0.4	N/A
Majority		358	9.1	N/A
Rejected ballots		14	0.4	N/A
Turnout		3,916	53.0	+12.0
Registered electors		~7,389		
Reform gain from Together for Bury		Swing	▲27.6	

=== Radcliffe East ===
Radcliffe East
Party	Candidate	Votes	%	±%
Radcliffe First	Carol Birchmore	1,293	45.8	−13.9
Reform	Oscar Kelly	799	28.3	N/A
Labour	Sally McGill	325	11.5	−21.0
Green	Mark Carrigan	309	11.0	N/A
Conservative	Azhar Mehboob	95	3.4	−3.9
Majority		494	17.5	−9.7
Rejected ballots		3	0.1	N/A
Turnout		2,821	35.0	+7.0
Registered electors		~8,060		
Radcliffe First hold				

=== Radcliffe North and Ainsworth ===
Radcliffe North & Ainsworth
Party	Candidate	Votes	%	±%
Reform	Paul Davies	1,371	35.8	N/A
Radcliffe First	Donald Berry	1,360	35.5	−7.0
Labour	Andrew McAnulty	424	11.1	−11.5
Conservative	Phil Smith	363	9.4	−24.9
Green	Lilly Beards	307	8.0	N/A
Communist	Eddy Redmund	8	0.2	N/A
Majority		11	0.3	N/A
Rejected ballots		7	0.2	N/A
Turnout		3,833	42.0	+6.0
Reform gain from Radcliffe First				

=== Radcliffe West ===
Radcliffe West
Party	Candidate	Votes	%	±%
Radcliffe First	Judi Sheppard	1,058	37.2	−18.9
Reform	Glyn Marsden*	888	31.2	N/A
Labour	Josh Harcup	436	15.3	−19.2
Green	Reece Bowey	305	10.7	N/A
Conservative	Keith Worthington	156	5.5	−3.1
Majority		170	6.0	−15.6
Rejected ballots		9	0.3	N/A
Turnout		2,843	35.0	+7.0
Registered electors		~8,122		
Radcliffe First gain from Reform				

=== Ramsbottom ===
Ramsbottom
Party	Candidate	Votes	%	±%
Labour	Charlotte Hunt	1,634	36.3	−24.5
Reform	Zach Campbell-Robinson	1,318	29.3	N/A
Conservative	Ann Schofield	600	13.3	−18.1
Green	Alex Mays	507	11.3	N/A
Independent	Jonathan Moss	323	7.2	N/A
Liberal Democrats	Martyn Bristow	119	2.6	−4.0
Majority		316	7.0	−22.4
Rejected ballots		8	0.2	N/A
Turnout		4,501	50.0	+10.0
Labour hold				

=== Redvales ===
Redvales
Party	Candidate	Votes	%	±%
Workers Party	Shabaz Shamim	1,029	29.5	−1.3
Labour	Nikki Frith	788	22.6	−14.4
Reform	Tony Davies	771	22.1	N/A
Green	Usma Khan	445	12.8	+0.7
Bury Independents	Alice Sugden	232	6.6	+0.7
Conservative	Geoff Baron	224	6.4	−6.7
Majority		241	6.9	N/A
Rejected ballots		14	0.4	N/A
Turnout		3,489	41.0	+6.0
Registered electors		~8,510		
Workers Party gain from Labour		Swing	▲6.6	

=== Sedgley ===
Sedgley
Party	Candidate	Votes	%	±%
Labour	Richard Gold	1,139	33.1	−30.9
Conservative	Avi Schwartz	844	24.5	−0.3
Reform	Dacey Prentice	796	23.1	N/A
Green	Rachel Webster	666	19.3	N/A
Majority		295	8.6	−30.6
Rejected ballots		14	0.4	N/A
Turnout		3,445	40.0	+8.0
Registered electors		~8,613		
Labour hold		Swing	▼15.3	

=== St Mary's ===
St Marys
Party	Candidate	Votes	%	±%
Labour	Eamonn O’Brien	1,884	45.6	−21.2
Reform	Luke Broadfoot	998	24.1	N/A
Green	Max Sampson	838	20.3	+4.9
Conservative	Ann Buckley	415	10.0	−6.1
Majority		886	21.5	−29.2
Rejected ballots		23	0.6	N/A
Turnout		4,135	48.0	+11.0
Registered electors		~8,615		
Labour hold				

=== Tottington ===
Tottington
Party	Candidate	Votes	%	±%
Independent	Yvonne Wright*	1,566	40.8	N/A
Reform	Liz Cronshaw	1,099	28.7	N/A
Conservative	Andrew Luxton	528	13.8	−31.7
Labour	Drew Bell	360	9.4	−19.6
Green	Chloe King	232	6.1	N/A
Together for Bury	Greg Keeley	49	1.3	N/A
Majority		467	12.1	N/A
Rejected ballots		0	0.0	N/A
Turnout		3,834	50.0	+11.0
Registered electors		~7,668		
Independent hold				

=== Unsworth ===
Unsworth
Party	Candidate	Votes	%	±%
Reform	Jerome Roith	1,340	34.1	N/A
Labour	Katherine Thorpe	1,018	25.9	−25.3
Bury Independents	Steve Middleton	702	17.9	−4.7
Conservative	Samantha Davies	418	10.6	−9.9
Green	Max Blackwell Pickup	398	10.1	N/A
Workers Party	Mehwish Nasir	43	1.1	−4.2
Communist	Chris Malkin	11	0.3	N/A
Majority		322	8.2	N/A
Rejected ballots		6	0.2	N/A
Turnout		3,930	47.0	+7.0
Registered electors		~8,362		
Reform gain from Labour				
