= John Forrest (footballer) =

English footballer

Personal information
- Full name: John Anthony Forrest
- Date of birth: 9 October 1947 (age 79)
- Place of birth: Tottington, England
- Position: Goalkeeper

Team information
- Current team: Rochdale (Chief scout)

Senior career*
Years	Team	Apps	(Gls)
1966–1980	Bury	430	(0)
1973	→ Atlanta Apollos (loan)	17	(0)
1981–1982	Macclesfield Town	9	(0)
- * Club domestic league appearances and goals

John Anthony Forrest (born 9 October 1947 in Tottington, Lancashire, England) is an English former professional footballer.

== Career ==
=== Playing ===
Forrest spent the majority of his career with Bury, where he played from 1966 to 1980. He also spent the 1973 season Atlanta Apollos in the NASL where he made 17 appearances.

=== Coaching ===
Forrest worked as a coach for Bury and was appointed chief scout of Rochdale in September 2007.
