= Tottington High School =

Location
- Laurel Street; Bury, Greater Manchester, BL8 3LY; England; 53.612319°N 2.336676°W

Information
- Type: Academy
- Established: 1955
- Local authority: Bury
- Trust: Shaw Education Trust
- Department for Education URN: 146529 Tables
- Chair of Trust: Andrew Meehan
- Head teacher: L Jaunbocus-Cooper (Interim)
- Gender: Coeducational
- Age: 11 to 16
- Enrolment: 875
- Website: https://www.tottington.bury.sch.uk/

Tottington High School is a coeducational secondary school located in Tottington, Bury, England.

The school opened in 1955. Previously a community school administered by Bury Metropolitan Borough Council, Tottington High School converted to academy status in November 2018. The school is now sponsored by the Shaw Education Trust.
