= John Greenhalgh (governor) =

John Greenhalgh (died 1651), was the governor of the Isle of Man.

Greenhalgh was the only son of Thomas Greenhalgh of Brandlesholme Hall in the parish of Bury, Lancashire, by Mary, daughter of Robert Holte of Ashworth Hall in the same parish, was born before 1597. His father dying in 1599, his mother married Sir Richard Assheton of Middleton, Lancashire, by whom Greenhalgh was brought up. He was well educated and travelled abroad.

On the death of his grandfather, John Greenhalgh, he succeeded to Brandlesholme Hall, was on the commission of the peace for and deputy-lieutenant of the county of Lancaster, and was appointed governor of the Isle of Man by the James Stanley, 7th Earl of Derby in 1640. In 1642 he was discharged as a royalist from the commission of the peace by order of the House of Commons of England. He fought under the Earl of Derby at the head of three hundred Manxmen at the battle of Wigan Lane in August 1651, greatly distinguished himself at Worcester (3 September), when he saved the colours from capture by tearing them from the standard and wrapping them round his person, was severely wounded in a subsequent affair with Major Edge, when the Earl of Derby was taken prisoner, but made good his escape to the Isle of Man, and there died of his wound, and was buried at Malew, 19 September 1651.

His estates were confiscated. Greenhalgh married three times: first, on 30 January 1608–9, Alice, daughter of the Rev. William Massey, rector of Wilmslow, Cheshire; secondly, Mary, daughter of William Ashton of Clegg Hall, Lancashire; and thirdly, Alice, daughter of George Chadderton of Lees, near Oldham. He had issue three sons and three daughters.
