= Deputy head teacher =

Second highest position in a school

A deputy head teacher, deputy headmaster, deputy headmistress, assistant head teacher, assistant headmaster or assistant headmistress is the second most senior teacher in a school in the United Kingdom and elsewhere. Secondary schools usually also have between one and five deputy heads ("depute head" in Scotland) and several assistant heads, who act as assistants or subordinates to the head teacher or executive head teacher.

== Particulars ==
Commonly, a state school will have between two and six assistant head teachers (AHTs). Each AHT is normally in charge of a specific area of the school, such as administration, staff appraisal, first year, sixth form, or discipline. Normally, AHTs have only a small teaching role within the school.

A state primary school will usually have a single deputy head, although they may sometimes be replaced by two assistant heads. In some larger primary schools, there may be two deputy heads or a mixture of deputy head and assistant heads. In some primary schools, deputy heads may be class based with some non contact time to carry out leadership or management roles. In other primary schools, the deputy head may not have a full time teaching role, but have a range of whole school leadership responsibilities.

The terms "deputy headmaster" and "deputy headmistress" used to be the standard throughout both the state and private sectors, with "deputy head teacher" usually being used only to refer to them collectively. In recent years, however, it has become usual to officially use the gender neutral term in state schools. Nevertheless, the gender specific terms are still in common use, and may be in more formal use in some schools, particularly the remaining state grammar schools. Independent schools usually still officially use the gender specific terms. Some use other terms, such as "senior master" or "second master", but these terms have generally gone out of use in the state sector.

In state secondary schools, the second master or second mistress was usually the third most senior teacher after the head and deputy head, and in coeducational schools, there was often a second master and a second mistress, in charge of the boys and girls respectively. They were paid a supplement to their ordinary class teacher's salary, as opposed to the head and deputy head, who were paid on separate scales from ordinary teachers.

The term "second master" is still used to refer to the third most senior teacher in some independent schools.

In some schools, a deputy head is the third most senior teacher, coming after the senior deputy head. The senior deputy head will run the school in absence of the head teacher. The senior deputy may be the line manager for other deputy head teachers, as well as tackling multiple leadership duties themselves, but this is not always the case. Also, in certain schools – usually where the head teacher performs the role of an executive head teacher for other schools – the post of associate head teacher is becoming increasingly common.

An associate head teacher is more senior than a deputy, but less senior than the head. They are, in effect, the head teacher in the head's absence, or in some cases serve as the head teacher of a school being overseen by an executive head teacher. In many schools, deputy head teachers still retain some teaching responsibility, but in most, their duties are increasingly managerial and pastoral.

== See also ==
- Staffroom
