= Tottington, Greater Manchester =

Town in Greater Manchester, England

Coordinates: 53.613°N 2.339°W

Tottington
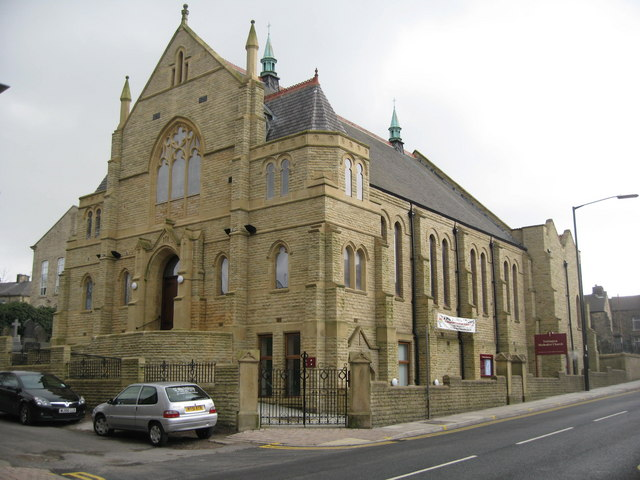
- Tottington Methodist Church, 2007

- Location within Greater Manchester
- Population: 9,783 (2011 Census)
- OS grid reference: SD775130
  - London: 173 mi (278 km)
- Metropolitan borough: Bury
- Metropolitan county: Greater Manchester
- Region: North West
- Country: England
- Sovereign state: United Kingdom
- Post town: BURY
- Postcode district: BL8
- Dialling code: 01204
- Police: Greater Manchester
- Fire: Greater Manchester
- Ambulance: North West
- UK Parliament: Bury North

Tottington is a town in the Metropolitan Borough of Bury in Greater Manchester, England, on the edge of the West Pennine Moors. In 2011 it had a population of 9783.

Historically in Lancashire, it was a medieval fee, a type of royal manor, which encompassed several townships from Musbury and Cowpe with Lench in the north to Affetside in the west and Walshaw in the south west, while the township of Tottington itself was a small agricultural settlement surrounded by open farmland and hunting ground where deer and wild boar were found.

== History ==
There is no mention of Tottington in the Domesday Book and little evidence of a settlement before the Norman conquest. The earliest extant record of Tottington is from 1212 when it was recorded as Totinton. Tottington's name is most likely derived from the Old English for the land or farmstead belonging to a man called Tota; or "tot" may be from an Old English word meaning "hilltop lookout point".

Tottington was part of the larger Royal Manor of Tottington, which comprised the northern part of the parish of Bury and was originally part of the De Montbegon Barony (Roger de Montbegon was present at the signing of the Magna Carta). Throughout the Middle Ages the manor was reduced as land was exchanged and bequeathed. Walmersley and Shuttleworth were given to the Lord of Bury; Musbury and Cowpe with Lench in the north were ceded to Blackburnshire. The Manor of Tottington eventually formed part of the Honour of Clitheroe, which in turn became part of the eventual Duchy of Lancaster. When the Duke of Lancaster seized the throne to become Henry IV the duchy became royal and the Manor of Tottington with it.

Tottington Hall is first recorded in 1504, as the residence of the Nuttall family. The Nuttall family's fortunes improved throughout the Tudor and Stuart periods and in 1715 Thomas Nuttall built the first school in Tottington. In 1770 the hall and its estates were bought by John Gorton, whose family had made their wealth in the cotton trade. He brought his industrial expertise to Tottington, building Tottington Mill, Kirklees Mill and Leemings Hill Bleach Works; greatly contributing to the prosperity and expansion of the village in the Georgian period. During this time the family financed the building of St Anne's Church and vicarage, and refurbished Tottington Hall leaving it much as it stands today. In 1863 the hall and grounds were put up for sale and came under the Roberts family before being bought by the recently formed Tottington Urban District Council in 1918 for £2,750. Ownership was handed over to the newly formed Bury Metropolitan Council in 1974, who used it to house the village library. Bury Council closed the library in 2018. Running of Tottington Hall was taken over by the local community in 2018. Operating as the Tottington Centre, it houses a library, tea rooms and locally based clubs.

Little expansion occurred until the Industrial Revolution when in common with other Lancashire settlements in the 19th century, Tottington saw a large industrial presence develop, largely under the influence of John Gorton. Nine mills were listed in an 1891 directory producing calico, cotton cloth and yarn. In 1884 Hilaire de Chardonnet, a French chemist, came to the area to work on a cellulose-based fabric that became known as 'Chardonnay silk'. A forerunner of rayon it was an attractive cloth, Chardonnet displayed it in the Paris Exhibition of 1889. However, like celluloid it was very flammable, following several publicly reported accidents, it was discontinued. The site on Royds Street South reverted to typical Lancashire textile production until 1925, when the Kirklees Rayon Company began producing viscose continuous filament yarn at the mill. This continued until 1955 when viscose production ceased. Courtaulds took over the mill in 1962 and converted it into a dye-house, this work continued until 1980. The site is now occupied by the housing estate centred on Kirklees Street. Tottington Mill printworks was the subject of the 1921 sketch "Mill Yard, Tottington" by LS Lowry.

The rapid expansion of the local population in the early 19th century, and the abundance of public houses that followed, led to the building of Tottington Dungeon in 1835 to lock up drunks and miscreants. It is not known who built it, who the carved faces on the outer stonewalls represent or who carved them. However, it does share architectural similarities with the folly built in the grounds of Nabbs House in Greenmount, which was constructed at the same time by John Turner. The following is a first hand account from a local mill worker, as published in Victorian and Edwardian Lancashire by John Hudson (Published 13 November 2008):

In those days a large fair used to be held yearly in Tottington, about the end of August, when the street from Turton Road down to the Parish Church, as far down as the present Town Hall, was lined with stalls selling nuts and brandysnaps, etc. The ground about the Robin Hood Hotel served as the cheapjacks' stand, and also for the shooting gallery, while the field on the left of Harwood Road was the place where the trading in cattle, horses and pigs was done. 'Hobby' horses were in full swing behind the Printers' Arms, and a large swing boat caused merriment, the plumber's and confectioner's shops were not built then. Tottington had many more public houses than to-day, and the constable, John Wilkinson, had a very busy time. The old dungeon was often in use.

— Ralph Rooney b. 23 March 1862

In 1882 the Bury to Holcombe Brook Line was opened by Bury and Tottington District Railway. In 1888 the line was taken over by the Lancashire and Yorkshire Railway and Tottington railway station remained open until the line closed for passengers in 1952 and goods in 1963. On 16 September 1904 an electric tram service was introduced running along Market Street between Bury and Tottington by Bury Corporation Tramways; in response to this competition the following year the railway introduced new rolling stock and increased the number of 'halts' on the line such as at Sunnywood. Passengers had to climb up onto the carriages as there were no platforms. Following the closure of the line, in 1972 Tottington Urban District Council proposed that the trackbed of the former Holcombe Brook branch should be developed as a 3-mile recreational path; the project was adopted by Bury Metropolitan Council upon its creation and the pathway is now known as the Kirklees Trail.

During the Second World War, Tottington was hit at 5:50 am on the morning of Christmas Eve 1944 by one of 45 V-1 flying bombs, launched from adapted Heinkel He 111 bombers flying over the North Sea. The 'Doodlebug' landed on a row of cottages in Chapel Street, killing two men and four women and injuring 14 others, one of whom died later. Numbers 21 and 23 Chapel Street were destroyed, while two neighbouring properties and a shop were severely damaged. The impact left a crater 30 ft deep, a total of 27 houses suffered serious structural damage, eight of which had to be demolished. St Anne's Church nearby had all its windows blown out, save for one behind the altar. The Whitehead family of nearby Stormer Hill Hall raised funds to have the area turned into a memorial garden, which was dedicated in 1950. The original brass plaque was stolen in 1975 and the gardens now feature a memorial stone dedicated to those lost.

Since the War Tottington has expanded with the Moorside area residential development being built in the early 1960s and new property built on the site of many of the former mills such as Spring Mill and Kirklees Mill.

== Governance ==
By the 18th century what remained of Tottington Manor was divided into Lower End and Higher End. Lower End contained the village of Tottington, the hamlets of Woolfold, Bolholt and Walshaw in the south; Affetside and Hawkshaw in the west; Greenmount, Holcombe Brook, Redisher, Hazelhurst and Holcombe in the centre, and Brooksbottom, Nuttall, Nuttall Lane and Ramsbottom (with Tanners and Carr to its west) in the north-east, with the River Irwell forming the eastern boundary. Higher End consisted the lands and settlements that now make up most of Rossendale borough.

The old township boundaries were removed by the Local Government Act 1894. Tottington Higher End was divided between Ramsbottom, Rawtenstall and Haslingden. Lower End was split to form Ramsbottom and Tottington Urban District Councils. The urban district was divided into four wards – Central, North, East and West – each returning three members to the council. In 1933 two acres of the urban district were added to the County Borough of Bury. Since 1974, as part of the provisions of the Local Government Act 1972, the urban district has been part of Bury Metropolitan Borough. One of the last actions of the UDC was the creation of Old Kay's Park, named after John Kay, the park was created as a bulwark against further development encircling the community. The metropolitan council partially resurrected Tottington Lower End when it created the township forum of Tottington, North Manor and Ramsbottom, which covers much the same area. The UDC territory broadly correlates with the Tottington ward of Bury Council and returns three councillors. Following an October 2015 by-election, the councillors representing the ward are:

- Yvonne Wright (Independent)
- Ian Gartside (Con)
- Luis McBrair (Con)

As of 2015, Ian Gartside is the leader of the opposition on Bury Council.

Tottington is part of the Bury North parliamentary constituency, which has been represented by James Daly (Conservative)since the 2019 general election. The constituency was previously represented by James Frith (Labour 2017–2019), David Nuttall (Conservative, 2010–2017), David Chaytor (Labour, 1997–2010) and Alistair Burt (Conservative 1983–1997).

== Geography and geology ==
Tottington's physical geography is characterised by its position at the edge of the West Pennine Moors and the Rossendale Valley. Directly north-west, Affetside Moor rises to a height of more than 900 ft above sea level and further north Top of Quarlton and Holcombe Moor dominate the skyline. From elevated parts of the town Scout Moor, Harden Moor and Knowl Hill are visible to the east. The villages of Affetside, Greenmount and Hawkshaw are north of the town, with Walshaw to the south west. Until the post-war period Tottington was a ribbon development along the Bury to Blackburn road, the Kirklees Valley to the east stopped development in that direction and kept Tottington distinct from Brandlesholme. Within the Kirklees Valley there are a number of artificial mill ponds and reservoirs created during Tottington's industrial heyday. Many of these have since dried up, but the remaining examples have proven an ideal habitat for numerous species of wildfowl and bats.

The superficial geology beneath Tottington consists of Devensian glacial tills, which overlie the Lower Pennine Coal Measures; the same sequences of sandstones, mudstones and coal seams that form the Lancashire Coalfield. There is no history of coal mining in Tottington, although most original buildings such as the dungeon are built from sandstone and gritstone quarried locally.

== Community profile and facilities ==
Running along Market Street, Tottington features a number of independent retailers including a veterinary practice, plus restaurants, a post office and a medium-sized Co-Op Food store. There are five pubs including the Old Dungeon Inn, which backs onto the Tottington Dungeon. Live music was regularly played at the Hark To Towler pub before it was closed and converted to apartments in 2018. Tottington Primary School and Tottington High School are both rated good by Ofsted. There are four churches in the town; St Anne's Church of England (1799), St John's Free Church of England (1867) Tottington Methodist Church (1905) and St Hilda's Roman Catholic Church (1963). Tottington Medical Practice opened in 1995 and houses 8 GP surgeries.

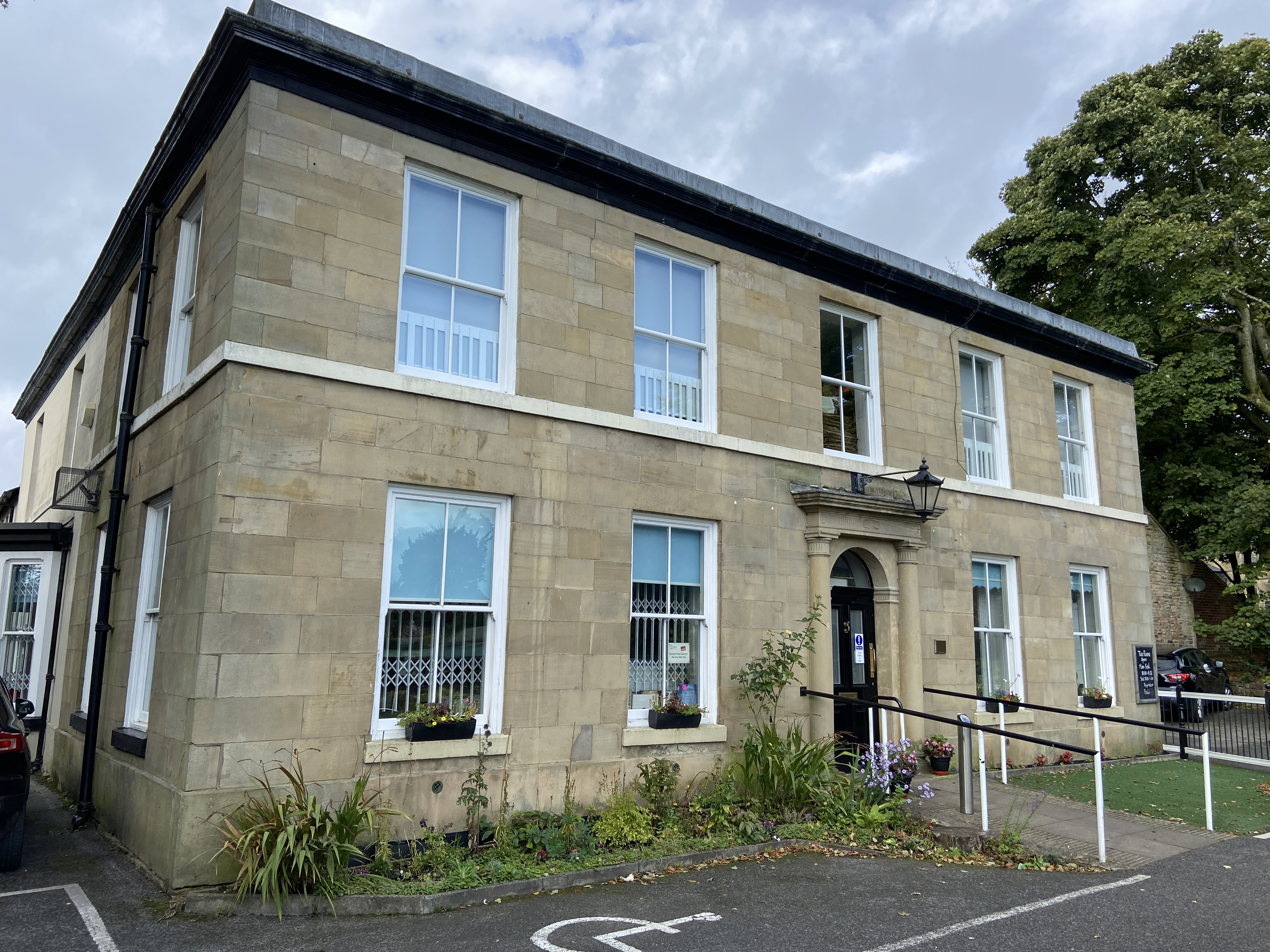
Tottington Hall has been the village library since the 1970s, operated by volunteers since 2018 after Bury Council announced its closure

Tottington Cenotaph was dedicated to victims of the First World War in 1930. Built of Portland stone as is the Cenotaph in London; it bears the inscription "We owe more tears to those dead men than time shall see us pay"; a line taken from Shakespeare's play Julius Caesar. It was designed by Lancastrian sculptor Walter Marsden and features two bronze wreath badges; one featuring a peace dove and the other the rising sun.

The village library, located in Grade II listed Tottington Hall and identified for closure by Bury Council in 2017, was saved from permanent closure by the efforts of a group of volunteers, led by councillor Yvonne Wright, and reopened in 2018 as Tottington Centre and Community Library.

The area is served by Tower FM local radio; so named after two landmarks in the stations coverage area; Turton Tower near Bolton and Peel Tower on Holcombe Hill near Ramsbottom. The Sustrans National Cycle Route 6 Runs through Tottington, following the old railway line, on its way from London to Keswick. Tottington is also served by regular direct bus services to Bury.

Tottington Public Band has been in continuous existence since at least 1835, making it one of the oldest brass bands in the country. During the course of its history, it has performed under various names including; Tottington Original Band, Tottington Prize Band and Tottington Silver Band. Tottington is also home to two amateur dramatic societies, a football club and a cricket club. An annual one-day music festival and fair has been held in the village since 2002, when it was first held for the Queen's Golden Jubilee. Despite the semi-rural setting, Tottington is well served by public parks and play areas, including Old Kay's Park to the north, Town Meadow Park behind the library, Compton Meadow and Two Brooks and Kirklees valleys.

== Landmarks ==
- 24 listed structures in Tottington, all Grade II.
- St John with Trinity Free Church of England, founded in 1853.
- Tottington Hall and gardens, now used as the village library and park.
- Whitehead Gardens which was built on the site of houses struck by a V-1 flying bomb on Christmas Eve 1944.
- Disused railway line to Holcombe Brook (pictures) once carried one of the first DC electrified railway lines in the world.
- West of Tottington runs Watling Street, the old Roman road running from Mamucium (Manchester) to Bremetennacum (Ribchester).
- Tottington Dungeon, at the junction of Market Street, Turton Road & Harwood Road, stone built with many faces and patterns carved into the blocks.
- Tottington Viaduct, a nine span construction now carrying the Kirklees Valley trail across Island Lodge Pond, originally constructed for the Bury to Holcombe Brook Line in 1882. At 125 yards long it was the largest bridge on the line and was built wide enough to accommodate a second track if required at a later date.

== Notable people ==
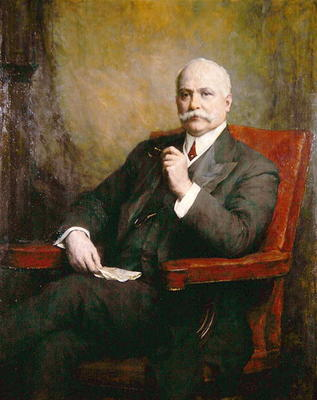
Sir Edward Holden, 1st Baronet, 1911

- Sir Edward Holden, 1st Baronet (1848–1919), banker and Liberal politician, developed the Midland Bank.
- Sarah Lord Bailey (1856–1922), elocutionist and teacher
- Ian Butterworth (1930–2013), a particle physicist, research director at CERN from 1983 to 1986.
- Antony Cotton (born 1975), actor, played Sean Tully in Coronation Street, born, brought and went to school locally.
- Tony Irving (born 1976), a former dancing champion, TV star and celebrity in Scandinavia
- Lisa Riley (born 1976), TV presenter, played Mandy Dingle in Emmerdale, was born and brought up land went to school locally.
- Vicky Binns (born 1982), actress, has played characters in Emmerdale and Molly Dobbs in Coronation Street
- Elbow (formed in Bury in 1997), an English rock band, included Craig Potter, Pete Turner and Richard Jupp. The band's first rehearsals were held locally at St Anne's Church Hall.
- Richard Ashworth (born 1869), a headmaster of leading schools in Middlesex (notably The Latymer School)

=== Sport ===
- Len Crompton (1902–after 1930), a football goalkeeper, who played about 150 games, mostly for Blackpool
- Bill Doran (1916–1973), a World Championship Motorcycle Racer in the early 1950s
- John Forrest (born 1947), footballer who played 430 games for Bury.

=== Other ===
- Lady Tottington, is a fictional character from Tottington Hall. She is the love interest of Wallace in Wallace & Gromit: The Curse of the Were-Rabbit. Her name continues the use of Lancashire placenames such as Wendolene, Ramsbottom and Preston, the dog in A Close Shave.

== See also ==
- Listed buildings in Tottington, Greater Manchester
- Tottington High School
- List of people from the Metropolitan Borough of Bury
- Tottington railway station
- Bury–Holcombe Brook line
