= Walshaw =

Village in Bury, Greater Manchester, England

Coordinates: 53.602°N 2.339°W

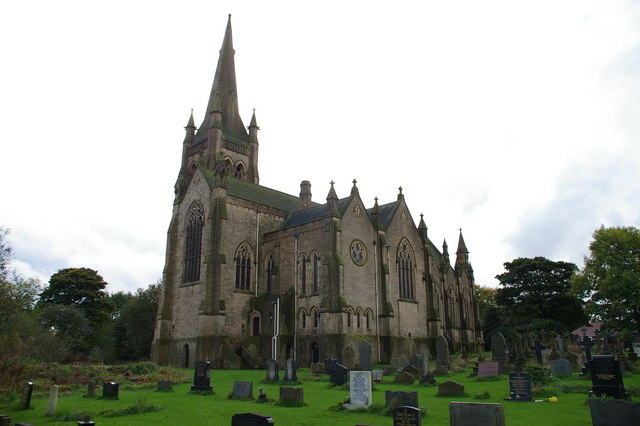
- Christ Church, Walshaw

- Location within Greater Manchester
- OS grid reference: SD775118
- Metropolitan borough: Bury
- Metropolitan county: Greater Manchester
- Region: North West
- Country: England
- Sovereign state: United Kingdom
- Post town: BURY
- Postcode district: BL8
- Dialling code: 01204; 0161
- Police: Greater Manchester
- Fire: Greater Manchester
- Ambulance: North West
- UK Parliament: Bury North

Walshaw is a village forming part of the Metropolitan Borough of Bury, in Greater Manchester, England. It is located to the south of Tottington and 2 miles northwest of Bury.

Walshaw lies around the top of Walshaw Road and the memorial cross and three radiating streets slightly to the North. One third of the centre of the village is taken up by Christ Church Primary School, which is linked to Christ Church on High Street.
