= Bury Council =

Local authority for Bury, England

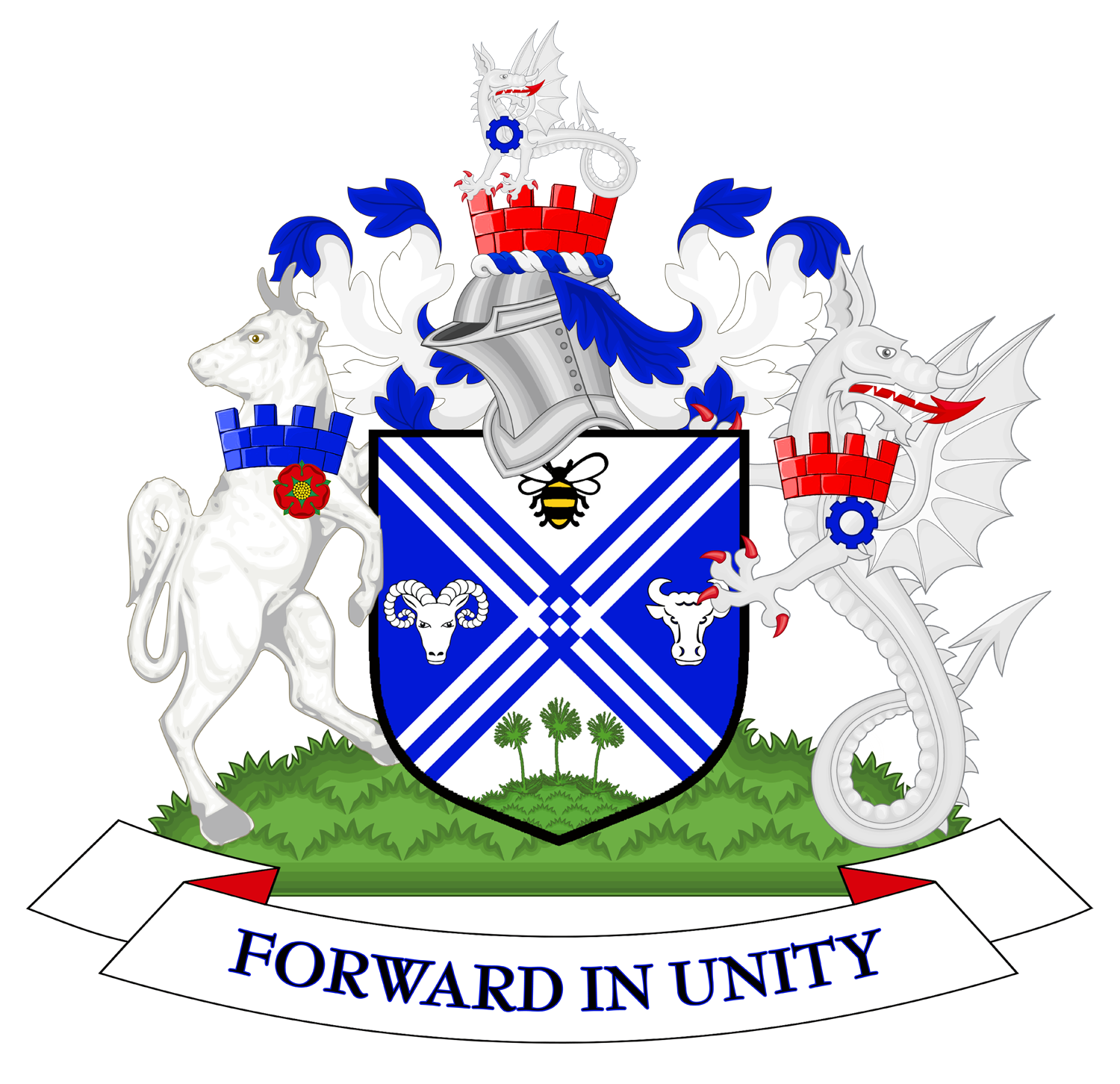
- Coat of arms

- Council logo

Type
- Type: Metropolitan borough council

History
- Founded: 1 April 1974

Leadership
- Mayor: Mohammed Tahir Rafiq, Labour since 20 May 2026
- Leader: Eamonn O'Brien, Labour since 20 May 2020
- Chief Executive: Lynne Ridsdale since 1 March 2023

Structure
- Seats: 51 councillors
- Graph of the party split among 51 seats.
- Political groups: Administration (31) Labour (31) Other parties (20) Radcliffe First (6) Reform (6) Conservative (3) Together for Bury (2) Workers Party (1) Independent (2)
- Joint committees: Greater Manchester Combined Authority; Greater Manchester Police, Fire and Crime Panel
- Length of term: 4 years

Elections
- Voting system: First-past-the-post
- Last election: 7 May 2026
- Next election: 6 May 2027

Meeting place
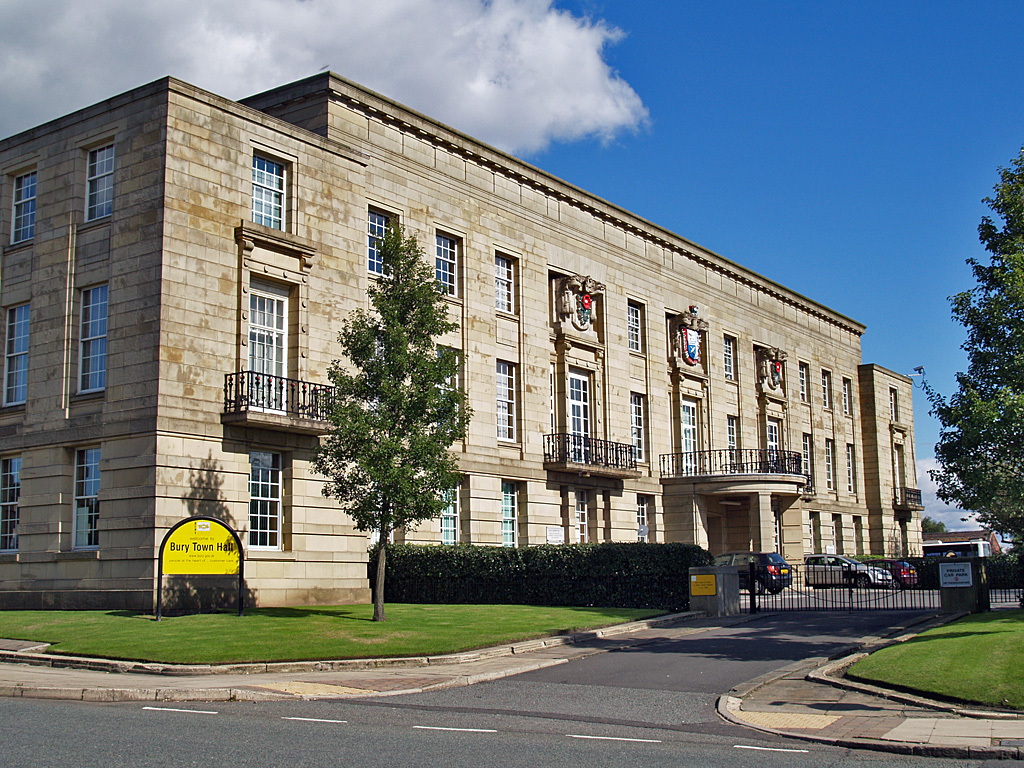
- Town Hall, Knowsley Street, Bury, BL9 0SW

Website
- www.bury.gov.uk

Bury Council, also known as Bury Metropolitan Borough Council, is the local authority of the Metropolitan Borough of Bury in Greater Manchester, England. It is a metropolitan borough council and provides the majority of local government services in the borough. The council has been a member of the Greater Manchester Combined Authority since 2011.

The council has been under Labour majority control since 2011. It is based at Bury Town Hall.

== History ==
The town of Bury had been governed by improvement commissioners from 1846. They were replaced in 1876 when the town was incorporated as a municipal borough, after which it was governed by a body formally called the 'mayor, aldermen and burgesses of the borough of Bury', generally known as the corporation, town council or borough council. When elected county councils were established in 1889, Bury was considered large enough for its existing council to provide county-level services, and so it was made a county borough, independent from the new Lancashire County Council, whilst remaining part of the geographical county of Lancashire.

The larger Metropolitan Borough of Bury and its council were created in 1974 under the Local Government Act 1972 as one of ten metropolitan districts within the new metropolitan county of Greater Manchester. The first election was held in 1973. For its first year the council acted as a shadow authority alongside the area's six outgoing authorities, being the borough councils of Bury, Prestwich and Radcliffe, and the urban district councils of Ramsbottom, Tottington and Whitefield. The new metropolitan district and its council formally came into being on 1 April 1974, at which point the old districts and their councils were abolished.

The metropolitan district was awarded borough status from its creation, allowing the chair of the council to take the title of mayor, continuing Bury's series of mayors dating back to 1876. The council styles itself Bury Council rather than its full formal name of Bury Metropolitan Borough Council.

From 1974 until 1986 the council was a lower-tier authority, with upper-tier functions provided by the Greater Manchester County Council. The county council was abolished in 1986 and its functions passed to Greater Manchester's ten borough councils, including Bury, with some services provided through joint committees.

Since 2011 the council has been a member of the Greater Manchester Combined Authority, which has been led by the directly elected Mayor of Greater Manchester since 2017. The combined authority provides strategic leadership and co-ordination for certain functions across Greater Manchester, notably regarding transport and town planning, but Bury Council continues to be responsible for most local government functions.

== Governance ==
Bury Council provides metropolitan borough services. Some strategic functions in the area are provided by the Greater Manchester Combined Authority; the leader of Bury Council sits on the combined authority as Bury's representative. There are no civil parishes in the borough; the whole area is unparished.

=== Political control ===
The council has been under Labour majority control since 2011.

Political control of the council since the 1974 reforms took effect has been as follows:

Party in control	Years
No overall control	1974–1975
Conservative	1975–1986
Labour	1986–1992
No overall control	1992–1995
Labour	1995–2006
No overall control	2006–2008
Conservative	2008–2010
No overall control	2010–2011
Labour	2011–present

=== Leadership ===
The role of mayor is largely ceremonial in Bury. Political leadership is instead provided by the leader of the council. The leaders since 1986 have been:

Councillor	Party	From	To
Albert Little	Conservative	Apr 1974	May 1986
Laurie Bullas	Labour	May 1986	May 1988
Colin Jones	Labour	May 1988	May 1993
John Byrne	Labour	May 1993	May 1997
Derek Boden	Labour	May 1997	May 2001
John Byrne	Labour	May 2001	18 May 2005
Wayne Campbell	Labour	18 May 2005	16 May 2007
Bob Bibby	Conservative	16 May 2007	18 May 2011
Mike Connolly	Labour	18 May 2011	18 May 2016
Rishi Shori	Labour	18 May 2016	10 Jul 2019
David Jones	Labour	10 Jul 2019	20 May 2020
Eamonn O'Brien	Labour	20 May 2020	

=== Composition ===
Following the 2026 election and subsequent changes up to September 2026, the composition of the council is:

Party	Seats
Labour	31
Radcliffe First	6
Reform	6
Conservative	3
Together for Bury	2
Workers Party	1
Independent	2
Total	51

The next election is due in 2027.

== Elections ==
Since the last boundary changes in 2022, the council has comprised 51 councillors representing 17 wards, with each ward electing three councillors. Elections are held three years out of every four, with a third of the council (one councillor for each ward) elected each time for a four-year term of office.

== Wards and councillors ==
Each ward is represented by three councillors.

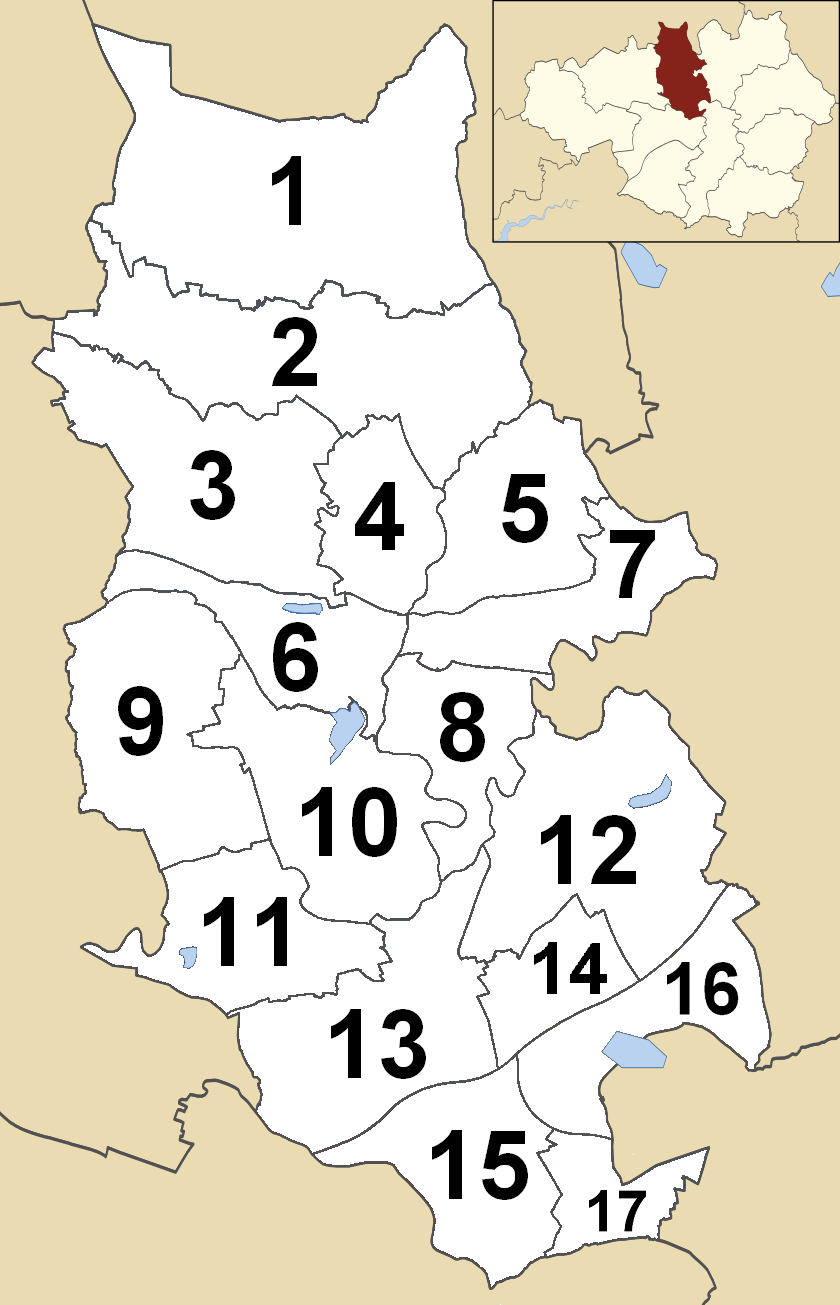
Council Wards 1 Ramsbottom 2 North Manor 3 Tottington 4 Elton 5 Moorside 6 Bury West 7 Bury East 8 Redvales 9 Radcliffe North & Ainsworth 10 Radcliffe East 11 Radcliffe West 12 Unsworth 13 Pilkington Park 14 Besses 15 St. Mary's 16 Holyrood 17 Sedgley

Parliamentary constituency	Ward	Councillor	Party	Term of office
Bury North constituency	Bury East	Ayesha Arif	Labour	2026-30
Bury North constituency	Bury East	Ummrana Farooq	Labour	2023-27
Bury North constituency	Bury East	Gavin McGill	Labour	2024-28
Bury North constituency	Bury West	Shahbaz Arif (Conservative Group Leader)	Conservative	2023-27
Bury North constituency	Bury West	David Hill	Reform	2026-30
Bury North constituency	Bury West	Dene Vernon	Together for Bury	2024-28
Bury North constituency	Elton	Martin Hayes	Labour	2024-28
Bury North constituency	Elton	Charlotte Morris	Labour	2023-27
Bury North constituency	Elton	Jack Rydeheard	Reform	2026-30
Bury North constituency	Moorside	Ciaron Boles	Labour	2024-28
Bury North constituency	Moorside	Babar Ibrahim	Labour	2023-27
Bury North constituency	Moorside	vacancy	Independent	2026
Bury North constituency	North Manor	Julie Anne Southworth	Labour	2026-30
Bury North constituency	North Manor	Khalid Hussain	Conservative	2023-27
Bury North constituency	North Manor	John Southworth	Labour	2024-28
Bury North constituency	Radcliffe North and Ainsworth	Paul Davies	Reform	2026-30
Bury North constituency	Radcliffe North and Ainsworth	Andrea Booth	Independent	2024-28
Bury North constituency	Radcliffe North and Ainsworth	Jo Lancaster	Together for Bury	2023-27
Bury North constituency	Ramsbottom	Charlotte Hunt	Labour	2026-30
Bury North constituency	Ramsbottom	Tom Pilkington	Labour	2024-28
Bury North constituency	Ramsbottom	Gareth Staples-Jones	Labour	2023-27
Bury North constituency	Redvales	Shabaz Imtiaz Shamim	Workers Party (UK)	2026-30
Bury North constituency	Redvales	Shaheena Haroon	Labour	2023-27
Bury North constituency	Redvales	Tamoor Tariq (Labour Group Deputy Leader)	Labour	2024-28
Bury North constituency	Tottington	Iain Gartside	Conservative	2023-27
Bury North constituency	Tottington	George Martin	Reform	2026-30
Bury North constituency	Tottington	Yvonne Wright	Independent	2026-30
Bury South constituency	Besses	Noel Bayley	Labour	2026-30
Bury South constituency	Besses	Miriam Rahimov	Labour	2024-28
Bury South constituency	Besses	Lucy Smith	Labour	2023-27
Bury South constituency	Holyrood	Adnan Chudary	Labour	2026-30
Bury South constituency	Holyrood	Imran Rizvi	Labour	2024-28
Bury South constituency	Holyrood	Lynn Ryder	Labour	2023-27
Bury South constituency	Pilkington Park	Shadman Zaman	Reform	2026-30
Bury South constituency	Pilkington Park	Elizabeth Fitzgerald	Labour	2024-28
Bury South constituency	Pilkington Park	Michael Rubinstein	Labour	2023-27
Bury South constituency	Radcliffe East	Carol Birchmore (Radcliffe First Group Leader)	Radcliffe First	2022-26
Bury South constituency	Radcliffe East	Ken Simpson	Radcliffe First	2024-28
Bury South constituency	Radcliffe East	Mary Walsh	Radcliffe First	2023-27
Bury South constituency	Radcliffe West	Des Duncalfe (Radcliffe First Group Deputy Leader)	Radcliffe First	2024-28
Bury South constituency	Radcliffe West	Judi Sheppard	Radcliffe First	2026-30
Bury South constituency	Radcliffe West	Mike Smith (Deputy Mayor)	Radcliffe First	2023-27
Bury South constituency	Sedgley	Richard Gold	Labour	2026-30
Bury South constituency	Sedgley	Alan Quinn	Labour	2024-28
Bury South constituency	Sedgley	Debbie Quinn	Labour	2023-27
Bury South constituency	St. Mary's	Debra Green	Labour	2024-28
Bury South constituency	St. Mary's	Eamonn O'Brien (Labour Leader and Leader of the Council)	Labour	2026-30
Bury South constituency	St. Mary's	Sean Thorpe	Labour	2023-27
Bury South constituency	Unsworth	Jodie Hook	Labour	2024-28
Bury South constituency	Unsworth	Jerome Roith	Reform	2026-30
Bury South constituency	Unsworth	Tahir Rafiq (Mayor)	Labour	2023-27

== Premises ==
The council is based at the Town Hall on Knowsley Street in Bury. The building was officially opened in 1954 for the old Bury Borough Council; construction had begun fifteen years earlier but had been interrupted by the Second World War. In 2023 the council announced plans to refurbish the building, allowing the council to consolidate its other offices into the Town Hall, notably from Knowsley Place opposite.
