= Guide Bridge =

Area in Greater Manchester, England

Coordinates: 53.475°N 2.114°W

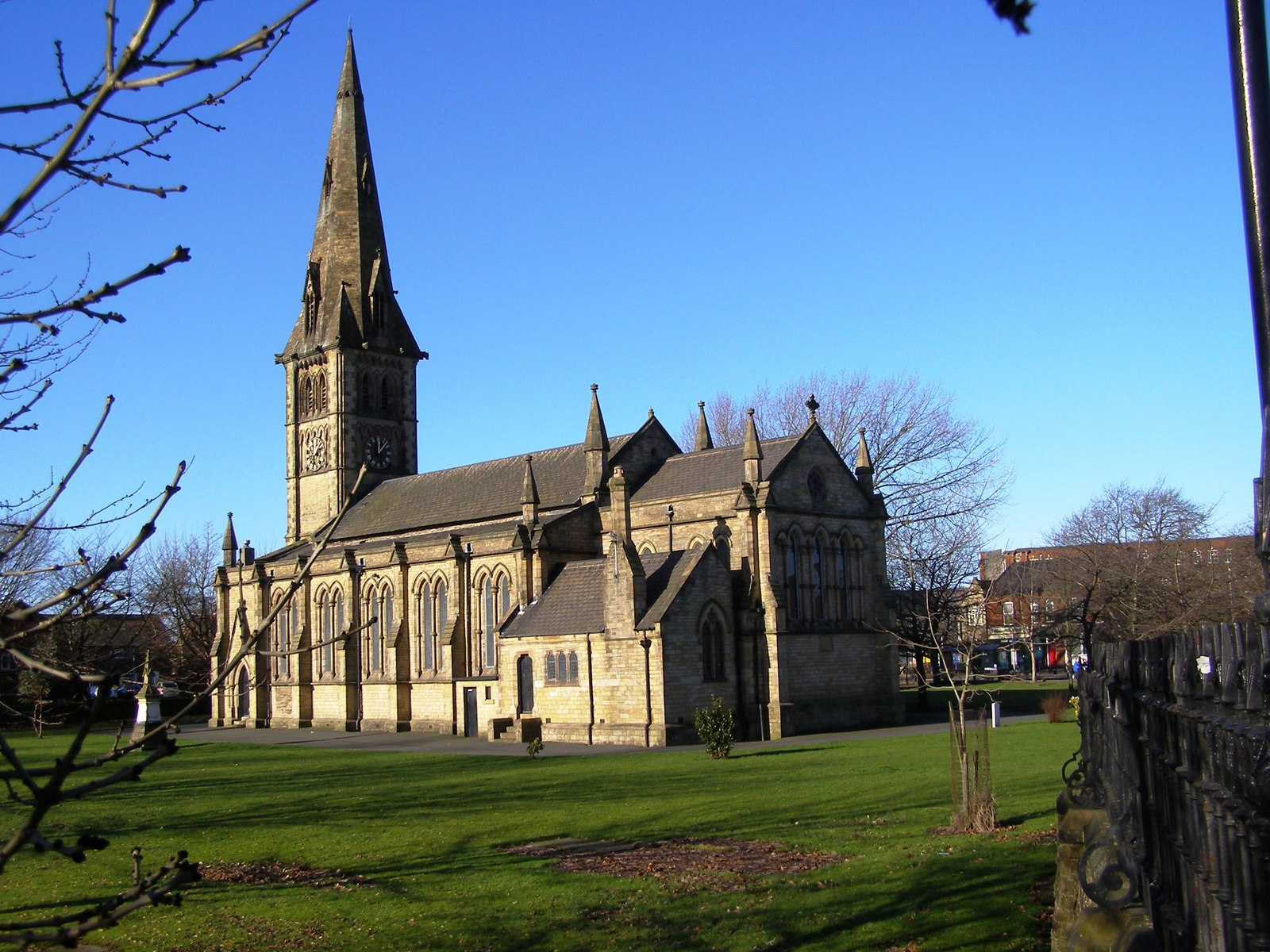
- St Stephen's Church, Guide Bridge

- Location within Greater Manchester
- Population: 1,659 (2001 census)
  - Density: 15.99 hm^{2}
- OS grid reference: SJ924976
- Metropolitan borough: Tameside
- Metropolitan county: Greater Manchester
- Region: North West
- Country: England
- Sovereign state: United Kingdom
- Post town: Ashton-under-Lyne
- Postcode district: OL7
- Dialling code: 0161
- Police: Greater Manchester
- Fire: Greater Manchester
- Ambulance: North West
- UK Parliament: Ashton-under-Lyne

Guide Bridge is an area of Audenshaw, west of Ashton-under-Lyne, in Greater Manchester, England. Historically part of Lancashire, Guide Bridge was built as a village around an eponymous bridge over the Ashton Canal.

== History ==
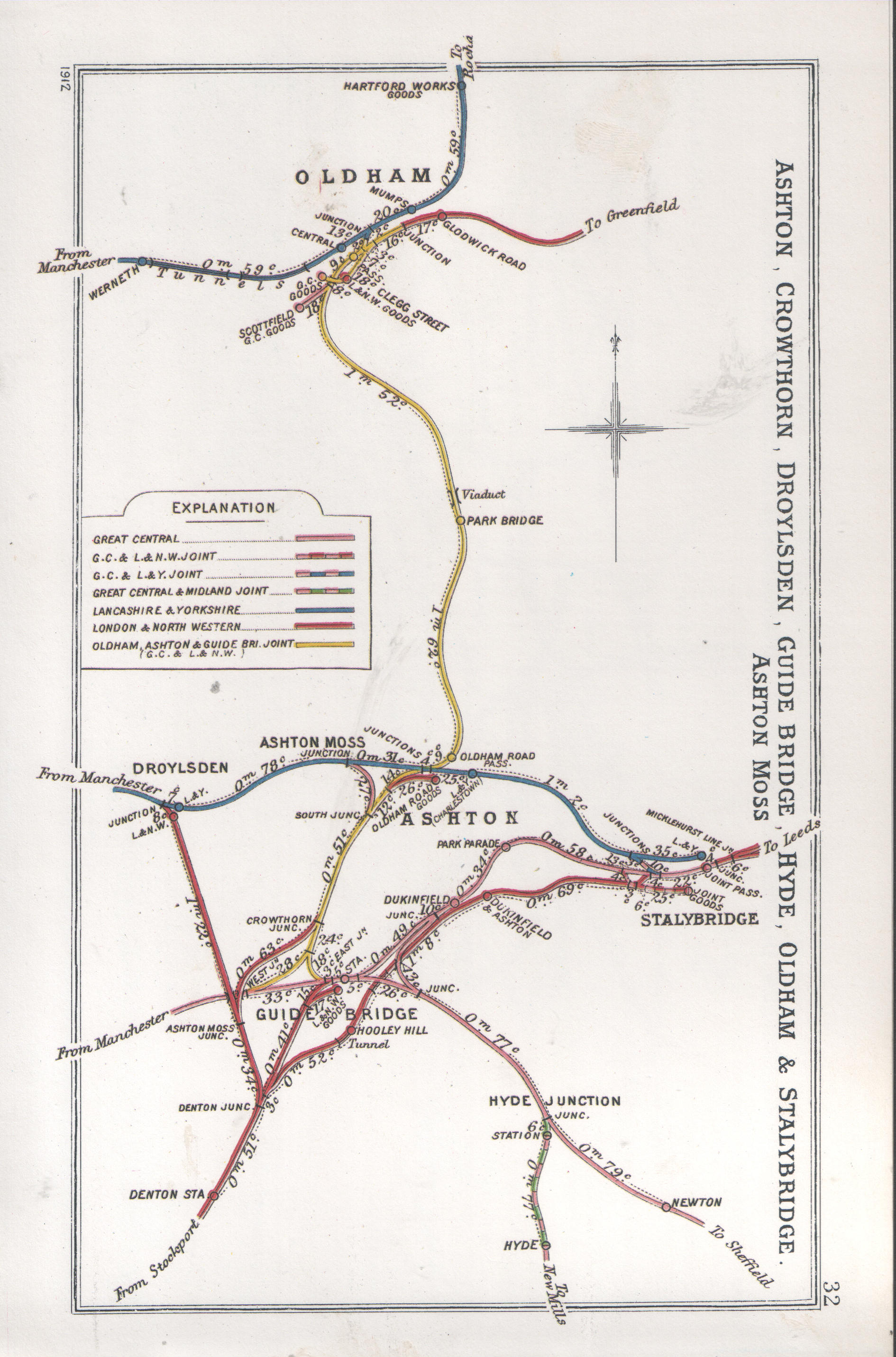
Map of the railways around Guide Bridge junction in 1912

Industries included Scott & Hodgson Ltd which had an engine shop near to Guide Bridge railway station. In later years, it was occupied by "Arnfields", makers of Mono-Pumps. Guide Bridge is located on the Ashton Canal and later on the Sheffield, Ashton-Under-Lyne and Manchester Railway. These were used for the transportation of raw materials and the delivery of parts of the finished engines. Guide Bridge was the home of the Jones Sewing Machine Company.

== Governance ==
Since the Reform Act 1832, Guide Bridge has been represented in the House of Commons of the United Kingdom as part of the Ashton-under-Lyne parliamentary constituency. The constituency was initially represented in the House of Commons by members of the Liberal Party until a period of Conservative Party dominance in the late 19th century. Since 1935, the constituency has been under Labour Party control. The member of parliament since 2015 has been Angela Rayner.

Guide Bridge Conservative Club is on Stockport Road.

== Community ==
At the centre of Guide Bridge is St. Stephen's Church and St Stephen's Church of England Primary School.

Guide Bridge is home to the Guide Bridge Theatre, formerly the Ashton and Audenshaw Repertory Club, which opened on 29 July 1972.

== Transport ==
Guide Bridge railway station is served by regular Northern Trains' services between Manchester Piccadilly to the west, and Hadfield and Rose Hill Marple to the east.
