= Scott & Hodgson Ltd =

British steam engine manufacturer

Coordinates: 53°28′26″N 2°06′44″W

- Industry: Engineering
- Headquarters: Guide Bridge, Greater Manchester
- Products: Stationary steam engines

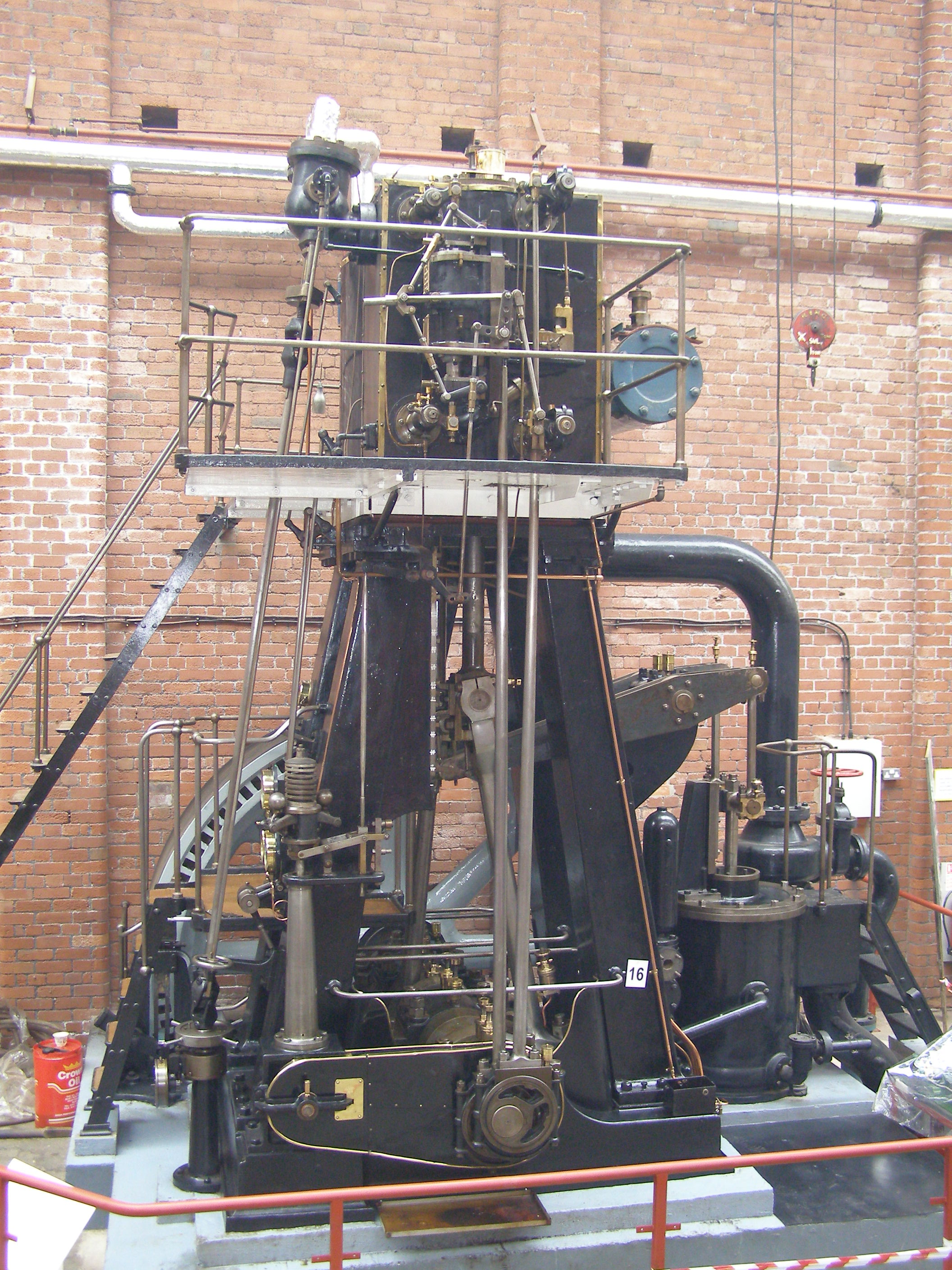
Inverted vertical compound engine from Diamond Rope Works

Scott & Hodgson Ltd, was a manufacturer of stationary steam engines in Guide Bridge, Greater Manchester. For instance, in 1914, they supplied an inverted vertical compound engine with Corliss valve gear to Hardman and Ingham's Diamond Rope Works, Royton, Lancashire. This engine is now in the Bolton Steam Museum.

== The Engine Works ==
Scott & Hodgson Ltd had an engine shop near Guide Bridge Station. It was convenient for the Ashton Canal, and later the Sheffield, Ashton-Under-Lyne and Manchester Railway – important transport links for the supply of raw materials and the delivery of parts of the finished engines. In 1938, the factory was taken over by J & E Arnfield Ltd, makers of Mono-Pumps.

== The steam engines ==
- Waterloo Mills, Silsden
- Dee Mill (ex Courtaulds), Cheetham Street, Shaw
- Diamond Rope Works, Shaw
- Stalybridge Mill, Stalybridge A rebuild of a 1600 ihp engine

== Diesel Engine ==
The Diesel engine was exhibited for first time in England on 30 March 1901 at Scott & Hodgson's Guide Bridge works. The demonstration took place with a 20 to 22 horsepower engine which was subjected to tests in front of experts, about 130 in all, who had journeyed from London by a special train. During the inspection, the engine was working at a pressure of 550psi, but was capable of 750psi. The heavier the load, the greater the pressure required and vice versa. Rudolf Diesel had invented his engine; Scott & Hodgson constructed the engine to the order of the company which had been founded to take over the English patent for the inventor.

== See also ==
- Hick, Hargreaves & Co. Ltd.
