= Brother Museum =

Museum in Nagoya, Aichi, Japan

- ブラザーミュージアム
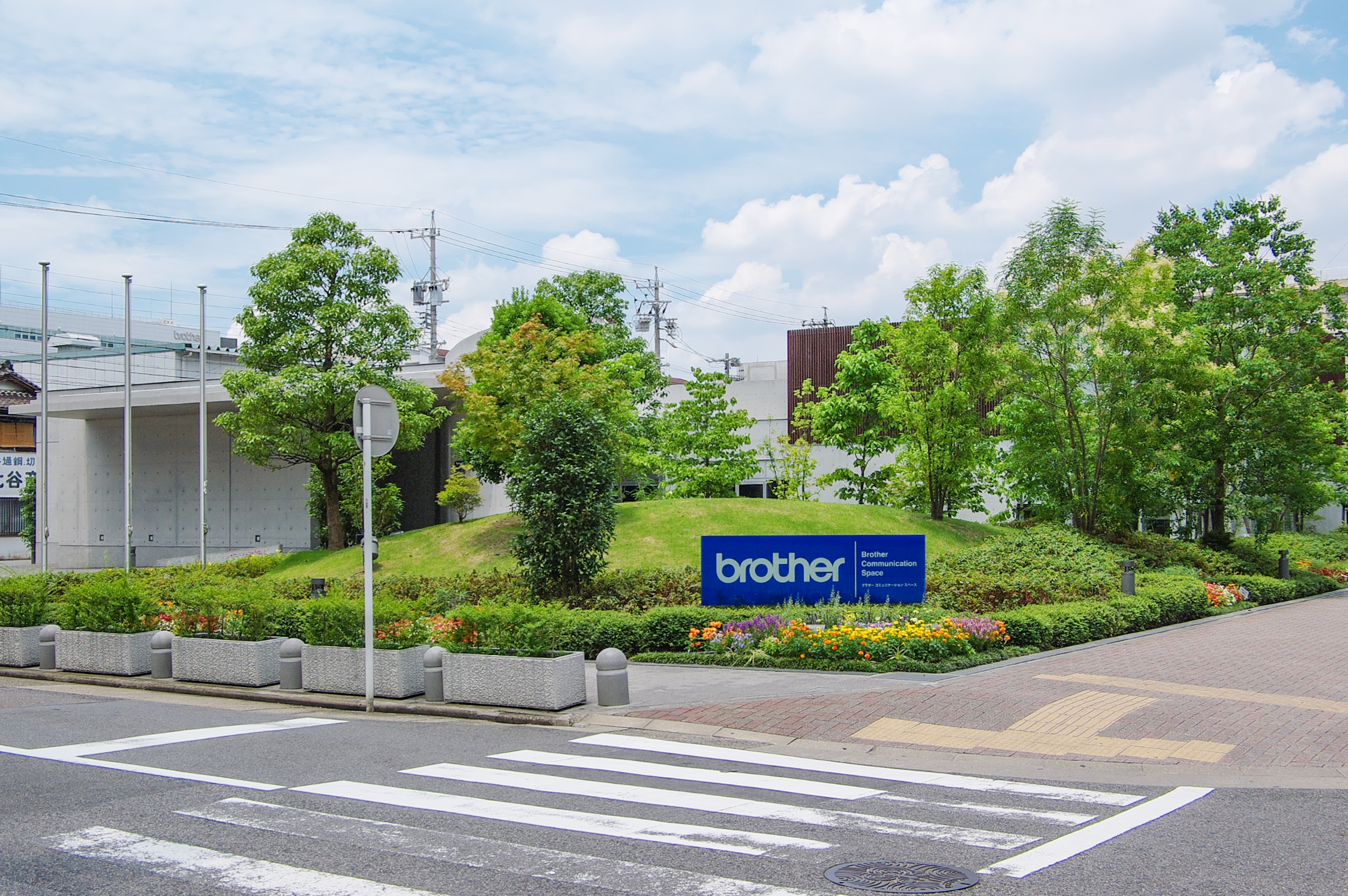

General information
- Location: 5-15. Shioiri-cho, Mizuho-ku, Nagoya, Aichi Prefecture, Japan
- Coordinates: 35.1189°N 136.9208°E
- Opened: March 2005.

Website
- Official website

Brother Museum is a corporate museum located in Nagoya, Aichi Prefecture, Japan. It is operated by Brother Industries.

== Summary ==
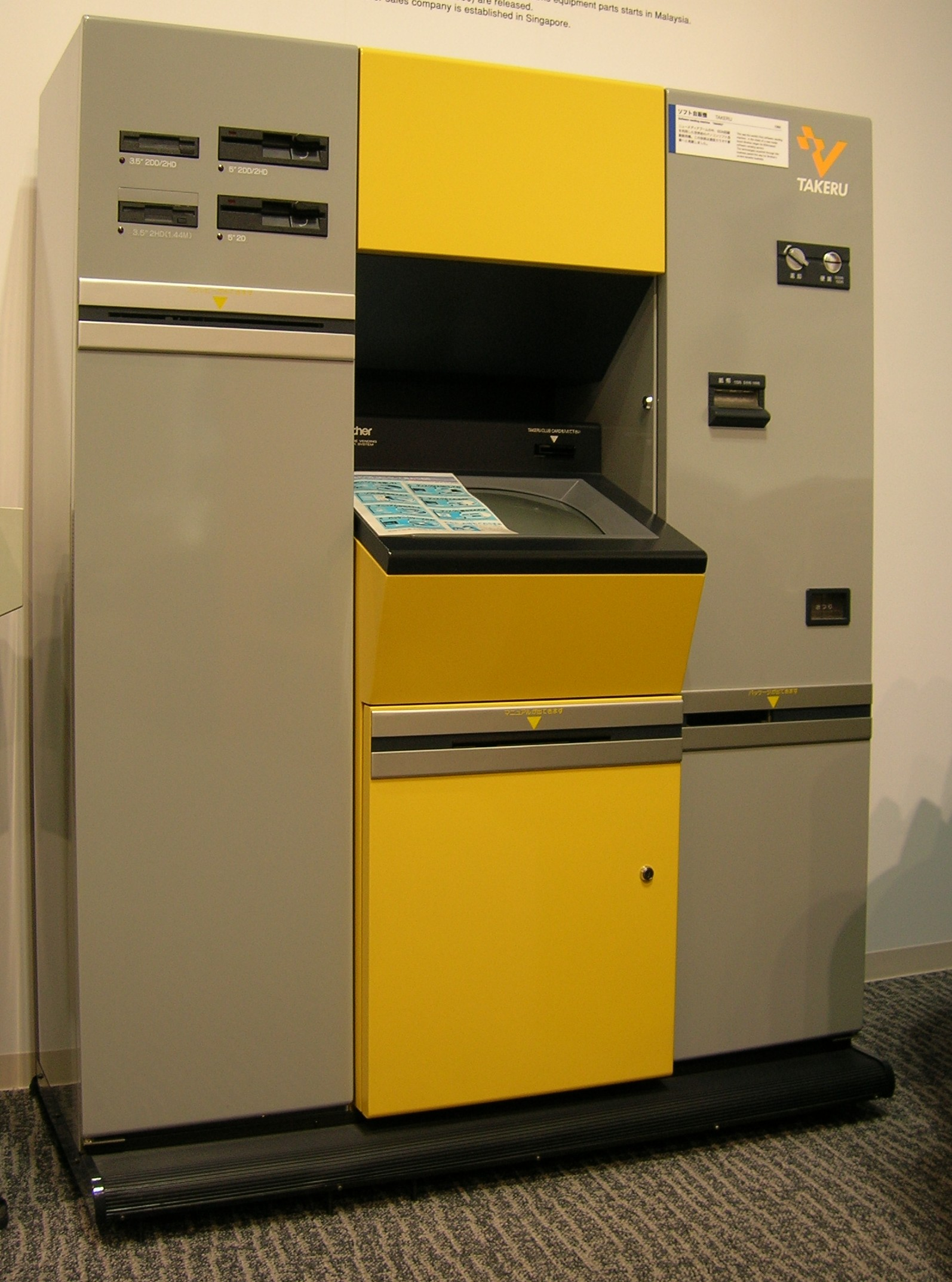
Software vending machine ”TAKERU”

It opened in March 2005 under the name "Brother Communication Space" and changed its name to the current one in January 2018.

The museum is divided into the "Product Zone", which introduces new products and businesses of Brother Industries; the "History Zone", which displays a knitting machine, typewriters, office equipment such as facsimiles and printers, and information and communication devices that were once manufactured by Brother Industries; and the "Sewing Machine Zone", which displays sewing machines collected from around the world. There is also a "Reference Room" with a collection of historical documents and books related to Brother Industries, and a hall that can accommodate 80 people.
