= Jones Sewing Machine Company =

British sewing machine manufacturer

- Formerly: Chadwick and Jones (1960); William Jones & Co. (1866); Jones & Co. (1867); Jones & Co. Ltd (1876)
- Industry: Machinery, Textiles
- Founded: 1860
- Founder: William Jones & Thomas Chadwick
- Headquarters: Lancashire, England
- Products: Sewing Machines

The Jones Sewing Machine Company was a British manufacturer of sewing machines founded in 1860 by William Jones and Thomas Chadwick under the name Chadwick and Jones, which later became known as the Jones Sewing Machine Company. The company produced sewing machines for almost 100 years, before being acquired by Brother Industries in 1968.

== History ==
As a master machinist, William Jones started making sewing machines in 1859 and in 1860 formed a partnership with his fellow lodger and master machinist, Thomas Chadwick. As Chadwick & Jones, they manufactured sewing machines at Ashton-under-Lyne until 1863. Their machines used designs from Howe and Wilson, produced under licence. Thomas Chadwick later joined Bradbury & Co. William Jones joined his brother to continue the business, opening a factory in Guide Bridge, Manchester in 1869. In 1893 a Jones advertising sheet claimed that this factory was the "Largest Factory in England Exclusively Making First Class Sewing Machines". The firm was renamed as the Jones Sewing Machine Co. Ltd and was later acquired by Brother Industries of Japan, in 1968. The Jones name still appeared on the machines till the late 1980s.

The Jones patent for his popular Serpent Neck model (also known as the Cat-Back and Serpentine model) appeared in 1879. These were manufactured until 1909. The Serpentine machines formed a lock stitch using a reciprocating (i.e., linear fore/aft motion) boat shuttle, while later models used a vibrating shuttle.

The B model received the 1884 Northampton Leather Exhibition prize for the best machine for closing boot uppers and general leather work.

The CS Family model was produced for many years. One version of it has "As Supplied to Her Majesty Queen Alexandra" written along the shoulder and like many Jones machines displayed very ornamental decoration ensuring that many are still kept in good condition as decorative items. You can find Jones machines and advertising with reference to her as "Princess Alexandra" and "Queen Alexandra" and there is a reliable account that while at technical school she did use a Jones machine.

Jones was happy to make machines under different names when ordering over 100 machines unlike Singer which would only produce machines with their name on. The different Jones machines can be found appearing under various name such as CWS (Co-operative wholesale society), Whiteley's universal, Federation (which is another machine for the co-operative wholesale society) which are all basically Jones Family CS machines. The Cat-Back design was also sold under the name Eclipse, and The Favourite. In 1969 Brother Industries bought the company, bringing its legacy to an end.

== Models ==
- Jones Medium TS
- Jones Family CS
- Jones 35
- Jones Family D53A
- Jones Popular
- Badged Federation For the Co-Op
- Badged Kenbar
- Badged Martlet
- B Model
- Serpent Neck
- Cat-Back

== Gallery ==
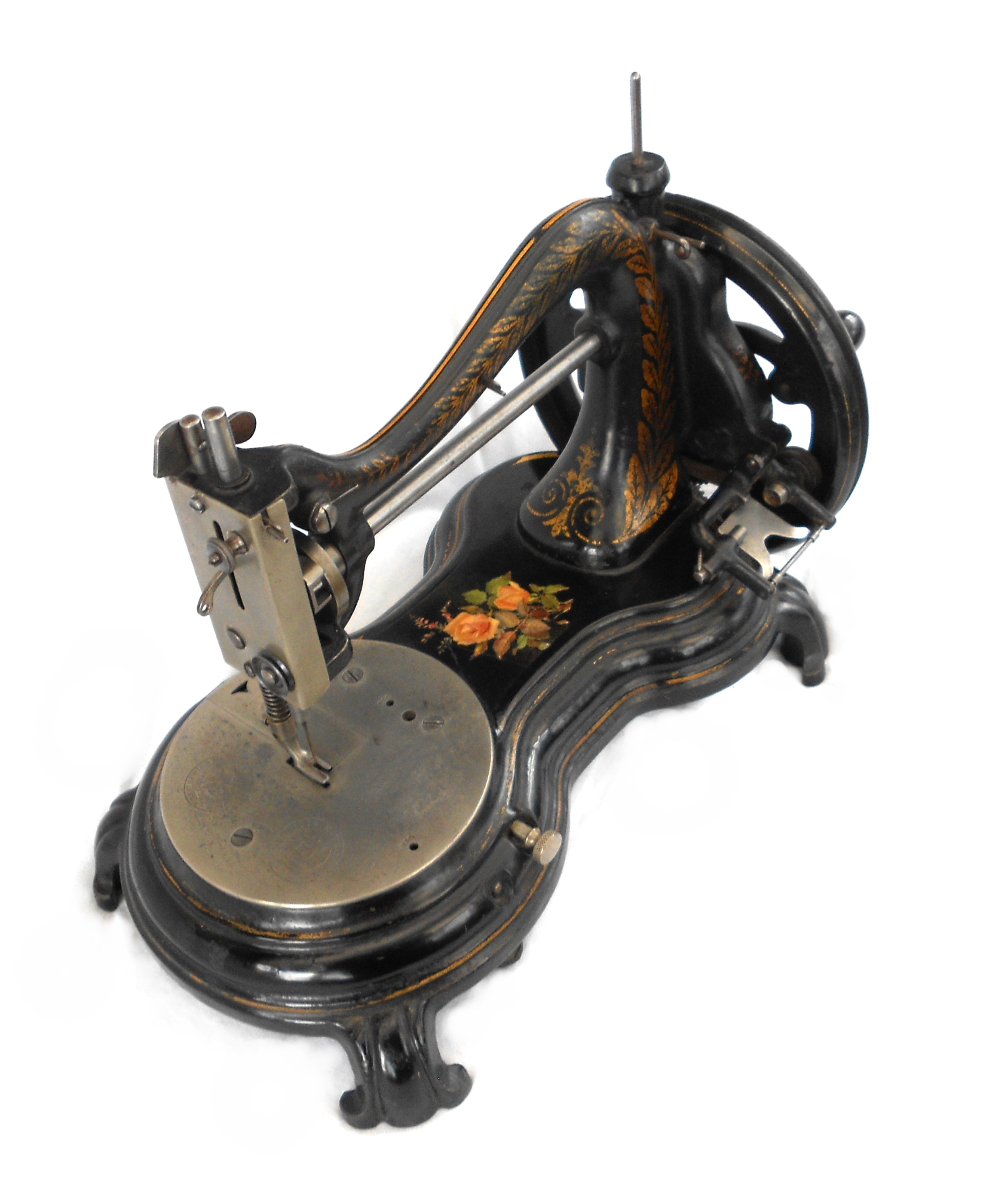
Early Jones cat-back. Often called serpentine or swan neck. Serpent neck with a flower pattern from around 1890.

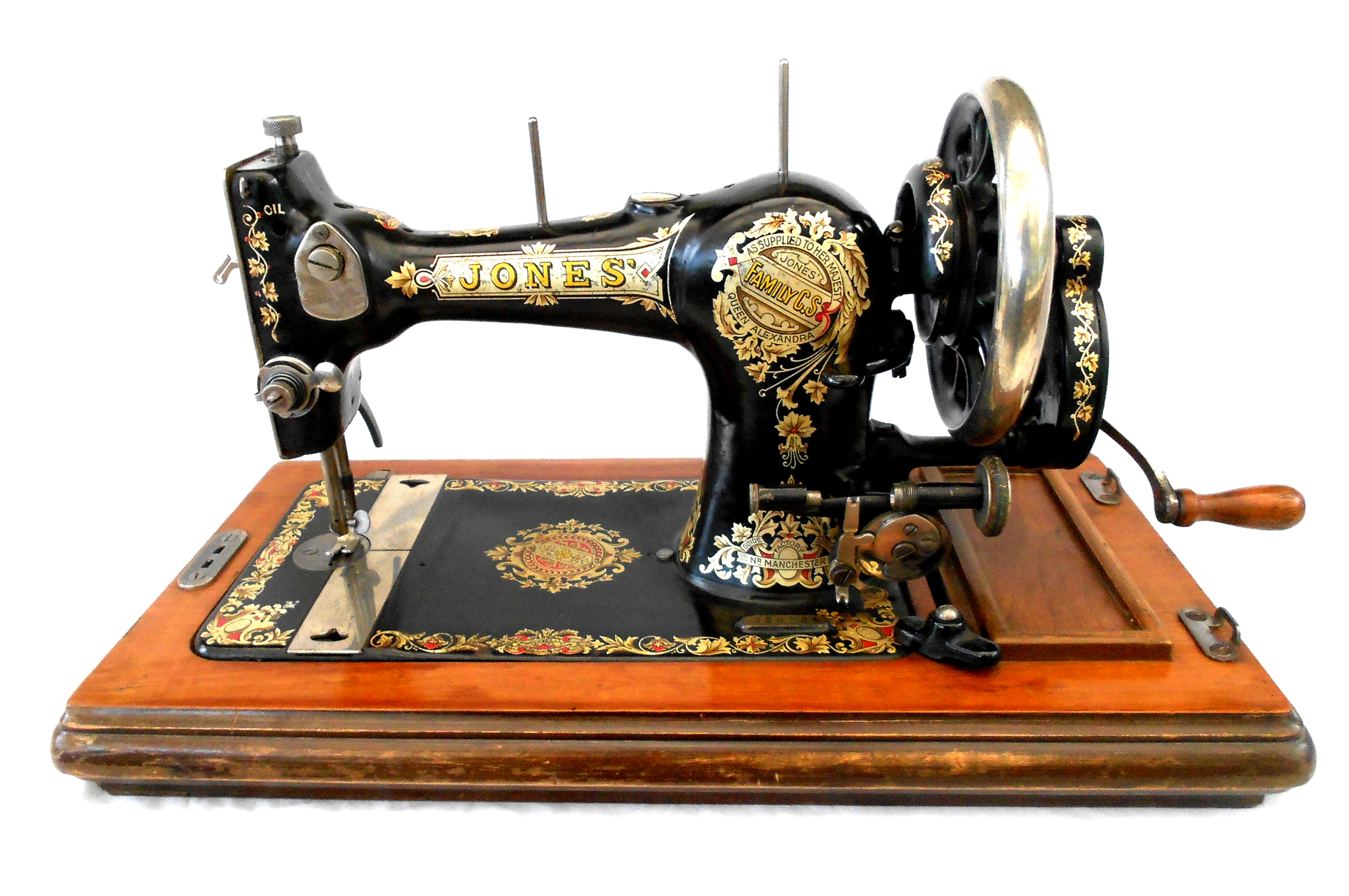
Jones Family CS Machine from around 1935.

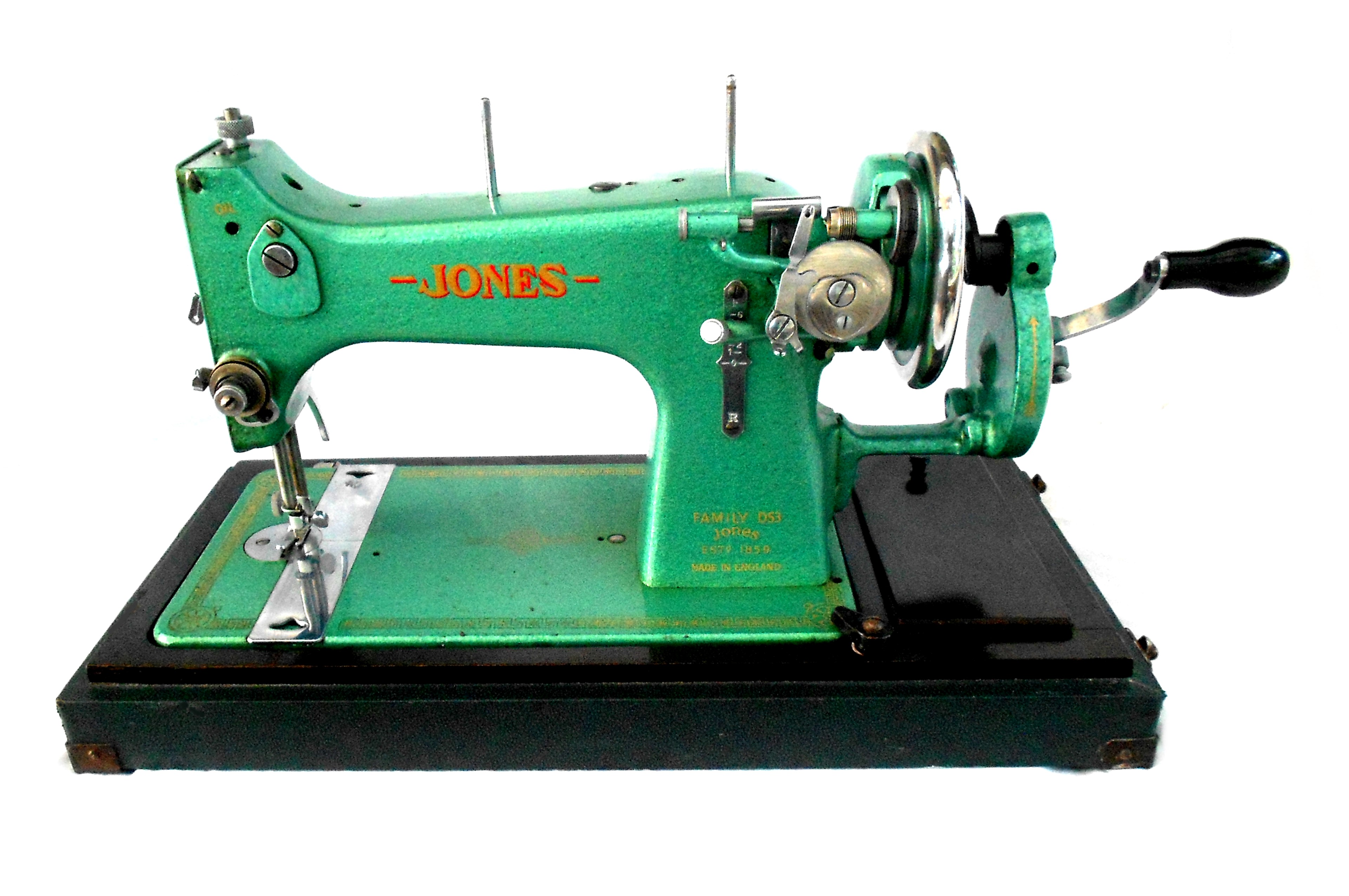
Jones D53 model in metallic green.

== See also ==
- List of sewing machine brands
