= Brother Industries =

Japanese electronics company

Brother Industries, Ltd.
- Logo since 1982

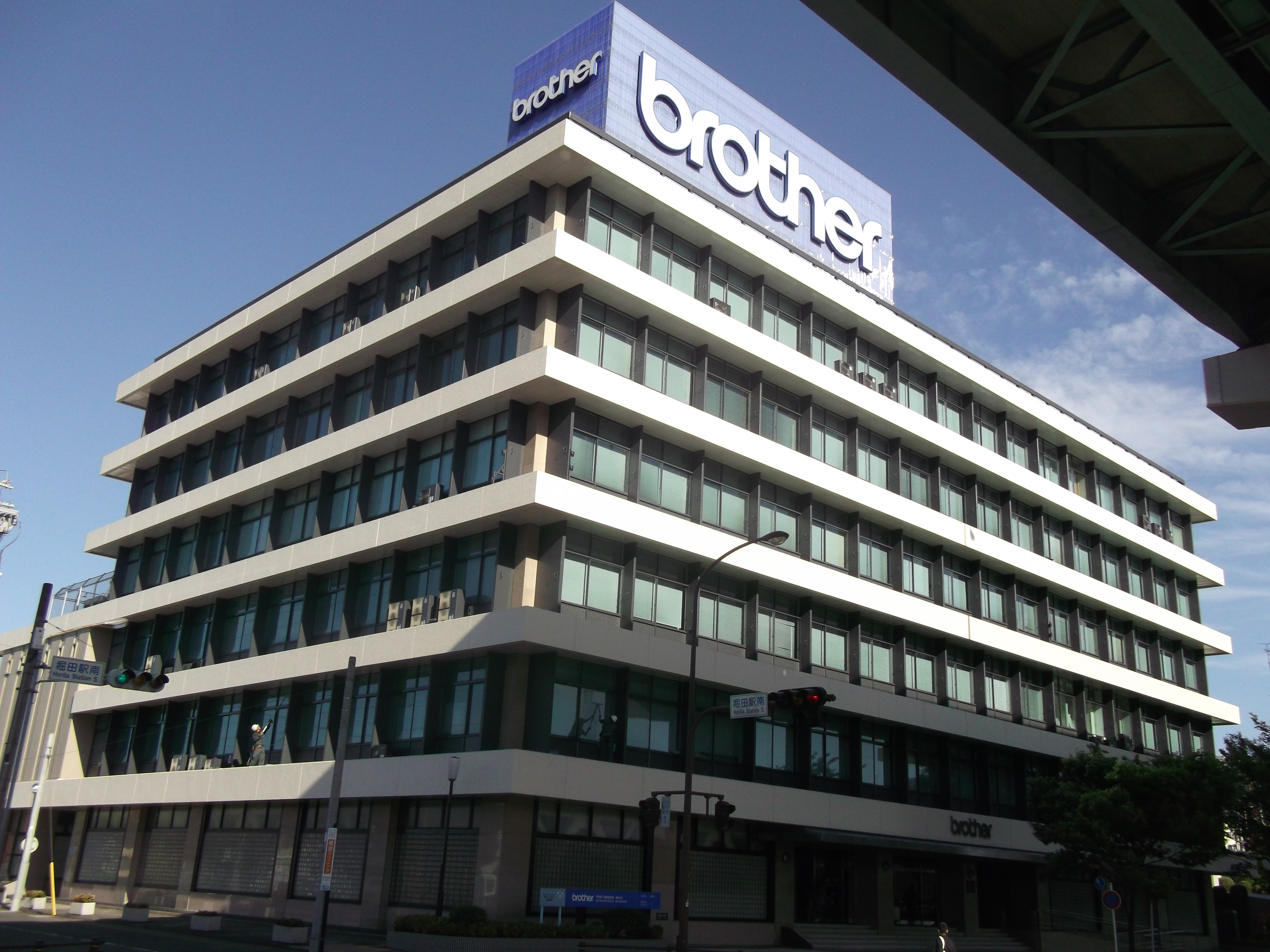
- Brother Industries headquarters
- Native name: ブラザー工業株式会社
- Romanized name: Burazā Kōgyō Kabushiki-gaisha
- Type: Public
- Traded as: TYO: 6448
- Industry: Printers, machinery
- Founded: 1908; 118 years ago (as Yasui Sewing Machine Co.)
- Founder: Kanekichi Yasui
- Headquarters: Nagoya, Aichi, Japan
- Area served: Worldwide
- Key people: Toshikazu Koike (Chairman); Ichiro Sasaki (President)
- Products: Computer printers Multi-function printers Desktop computers Fax machines Industrial sewing machines Typewriters; Knitting machines Domestic appliances Machine tools
- Revenue: ▲¥876.56 billion (2024)
- Operating income: ▲¥69.89 billion (2024)
- Net income: ▲¥54.79 billion (2024)
- Total assets: ▲¥932.65 billion (2024)
- Total equity: ▲¥691.47 billion (2024)
- Number of employees: 42,801 (2024)
- Website: global.brother

Brother Industries, Ltd. (stylized in lowercase) (Japanese: ブラザー工業株式会社, Hepburn: Burazā Kōgyō Kabushiki-gaisha) is a Japanese multinational electronics and electrical equipment company headquartered in Nagoya, Japan. Its products include printers, multifunction printers, desktop computers, consumer and industrial sewing machines, large machine tools, label printers, typewriters, fax machines, and other computer-related electronics. Brother distributes its products both under its own name and under OEM agreements with other companies.

== History ==
Brother's history began in 1908 when it was originally called Yasui Sewing Machine Co in Nagoya, Japan. The company name derives from an early sewing machine model, the Brother, which itself was named for the Yasui brothers, Masayoshi and Jitsuichi. In 1954 it entered the home and studio knitting machine market. In 1955, Brother International Corporation (US) was established as its first overseas sales affiliate. In 1958 a European regional sales company was established in Dublin. The corporate name was changed to Brother Industries, Ltd. in 1962. Brother entered the printer market during its long association with Centronics.

In 1968, the company moved its UK headquarters to Audenshaw, Manchester, after acquiring the Jones Sewing Machine Company, a long-established British sewing machine maker.

In March 2005, "Brother Communication Space" (now the Brother Museum), a corporate museum that also serves as a public relations facility, opened in Nagoya.

In December 2011, Brother diversified its offerings by acquiring Nefsis, an innovator in web-based remote collaboration and conferencing software.

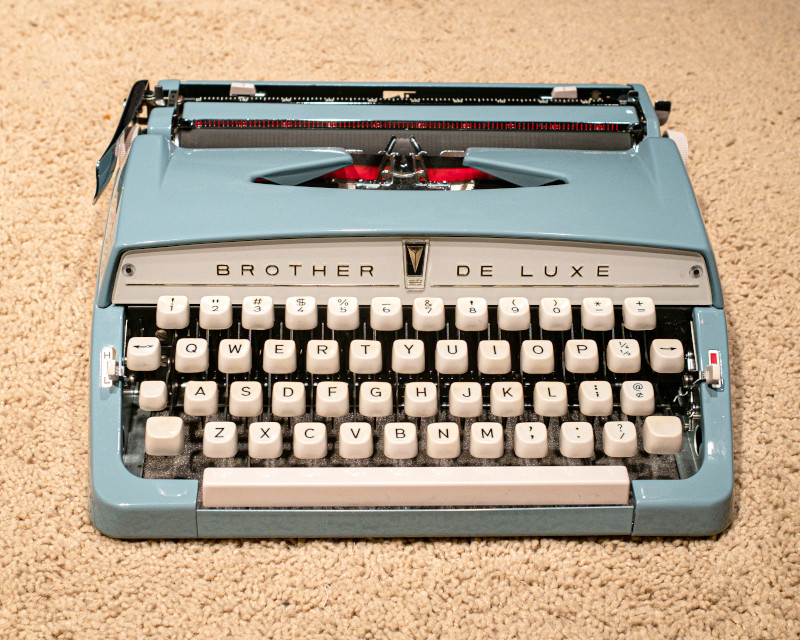
1960s Brother De Luxe manual typewriter

Brother competed heavily in the worldwide typewriter market, initially with its personal manual typewriters from its Nagoya factory and later with its own factories abroad (e.g., UK, USA), competing with brands that had dominated the international typewriter market—including with Japan's Silver Seiko Ltd. and others. In the 1960s and 1970s, Brother, along with Japanese companies Silver Seiko and Nakajima, were frequent targets of antidumping campaigns in the United States and Europe—for its low-priced manual typewriters. In November 2012, Brother announced that it had built the last UK-made typewriter at its north Wales factory. It had made 5.9 million typewriters in its Wrexham factory since it opened in 1985. Brother donated the last machine to London's Science Museum.

In September 2022, Brother celebrated a production milestone of 70 million home sewing machines made since mass production started in 1932.

== Sewing and embroidery machines ==
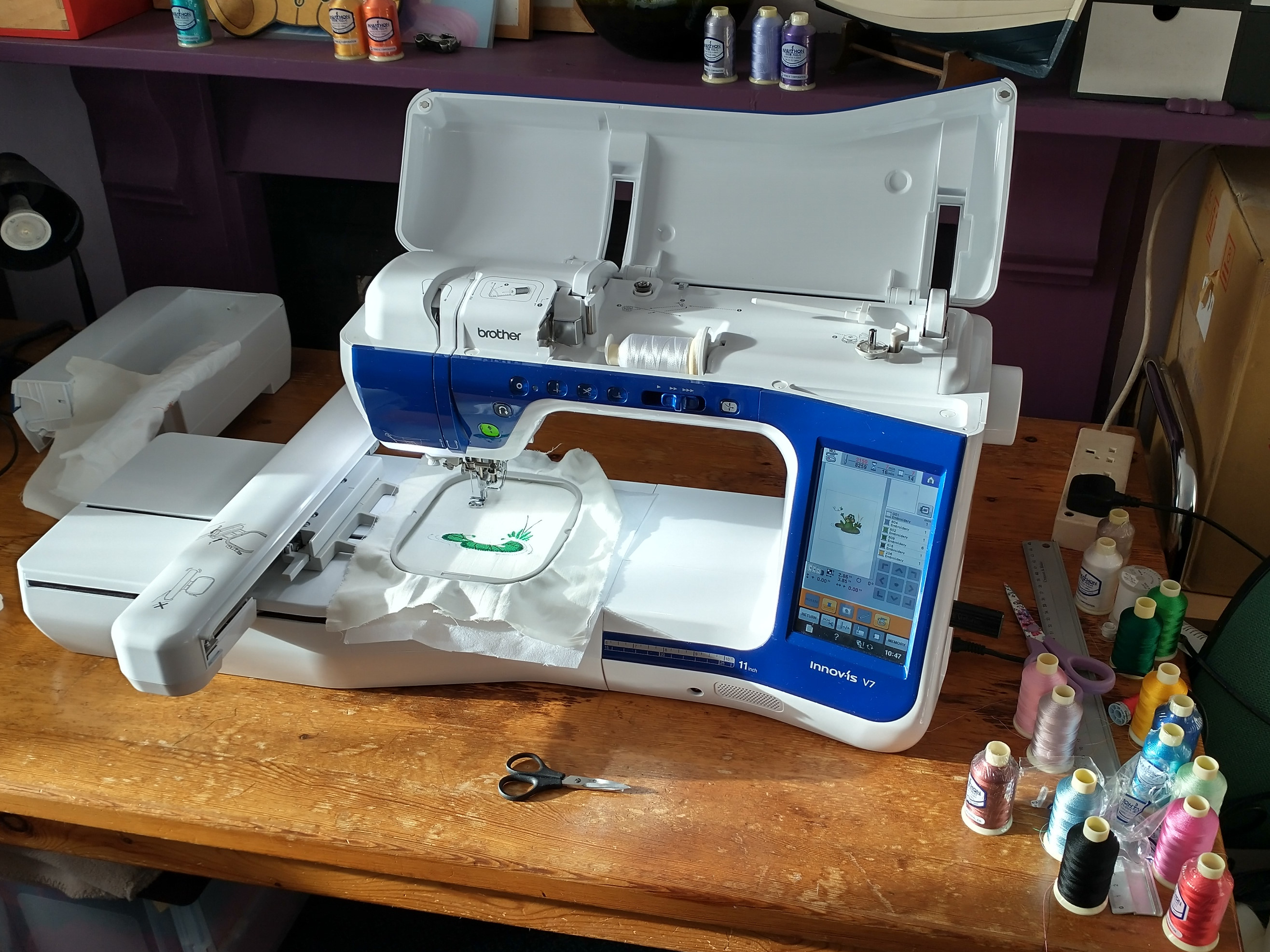
Brother Innov-is V7 computerised Sewing/Quilting/Embroidery machine

In 2010, the sewing divisions of Brother Industries around Europe were consolidated into one larger company called "Brother Sewing Machines Europe GmbH". With a turnover in excess of €80 million, it is the fourth-largest company under the Brother Industries Ltd umbrella of organisations.

Brother Industries manufactures mechanical sewing machines in Zhuhai, China and computerised sewing and embroidery machines in Taiwan. A new sewing machine factory was opened in 2012 in Đồng Nai province, Vietnam, which is the largest single-brand sewing machine factory in the world.

In September 2012, Brother Industries manufactured its 50 millionth home sewing machine.

In May 2017, Brother Industries manufactured its 60 millionth home sewing machine.

=== History ===
In 1908, Kanekichi Yasui established Yasui Sewing and Co. that provided repair services and parts for sewing machines. Meanwhile, Masayoshi Yasui inherited his company and renamed it to Yasui Brothers' Sewing Machine Co.

In 1928, the company's first product was a chain stitch sewing machine capable of producing straw hats. The machine was popular for its durability compared to German machines at the time.

They introduced and began mass production of home sewing machines in 1932, when Jitsuichi Yasui, Masayoshi's younger brother and co-founder of their company, succeeded in developing shuttle hooks.

In 1934, it was renamed Nippon Sewing Machine Manufacturing Co., then it subsequently manufactured industrial sewing machines in 1936.

Their 200 HA-1 domestic straight stitching sewing machines were exported to Shanghai, being requested by the Japanese government.

In 1979, it introduced and manufactured its first computerised sewing machine called ZZ3-B820 "Opus 8".

They started making commercial/multi needle sewing machines in 2003 with the introduction of the PR-600. 2010 marked its introduction of PC design and editing software on its sewing/embroidery machines (Innov-is I) called PE-Design.

In 2013, it introduced a home cutting machine named the CM550DX.

For the Japanese market, Brother introduced a sewing and embroidery combination machine called Parie in 2017.

On 7 August 2018, Brother officially revealed its new 2019 sewing machine product lineup at its Back To Business Dealer Conference held annually in Orlando, Florida to commemorate Brother's 100th anniversary since its inception in 1908. The newest top-of-the-line Brother sewing/embroidery/quilting machine is the Luminaire Innov-ìs XP-1. It features StitchVision technology, which uses light projections to virtually preview a stitch accurately and precisely, as well as a 10.6" by 16" maximum embroidery area.

== Other products ==
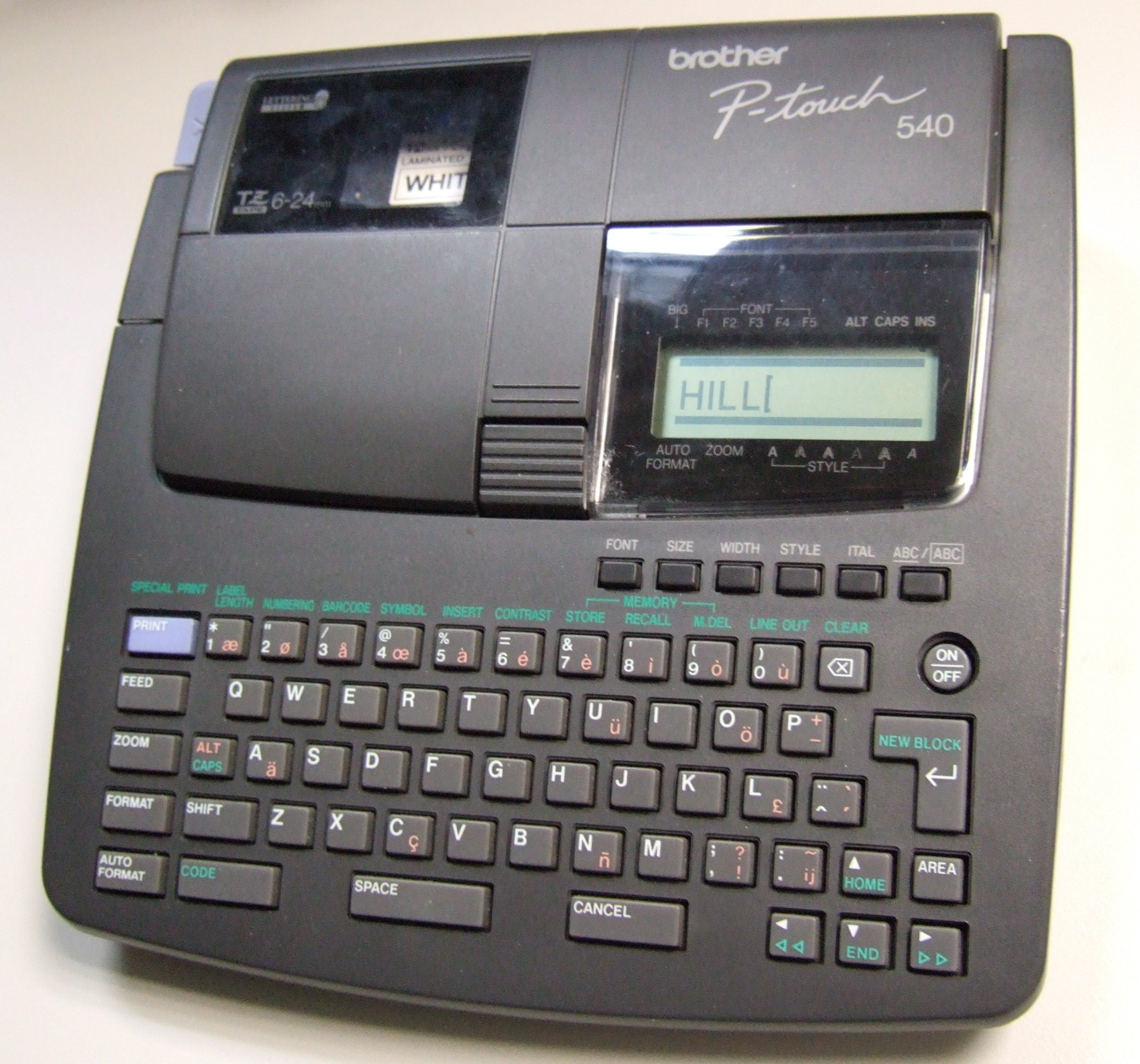
Brother P-Touch 540 label printer

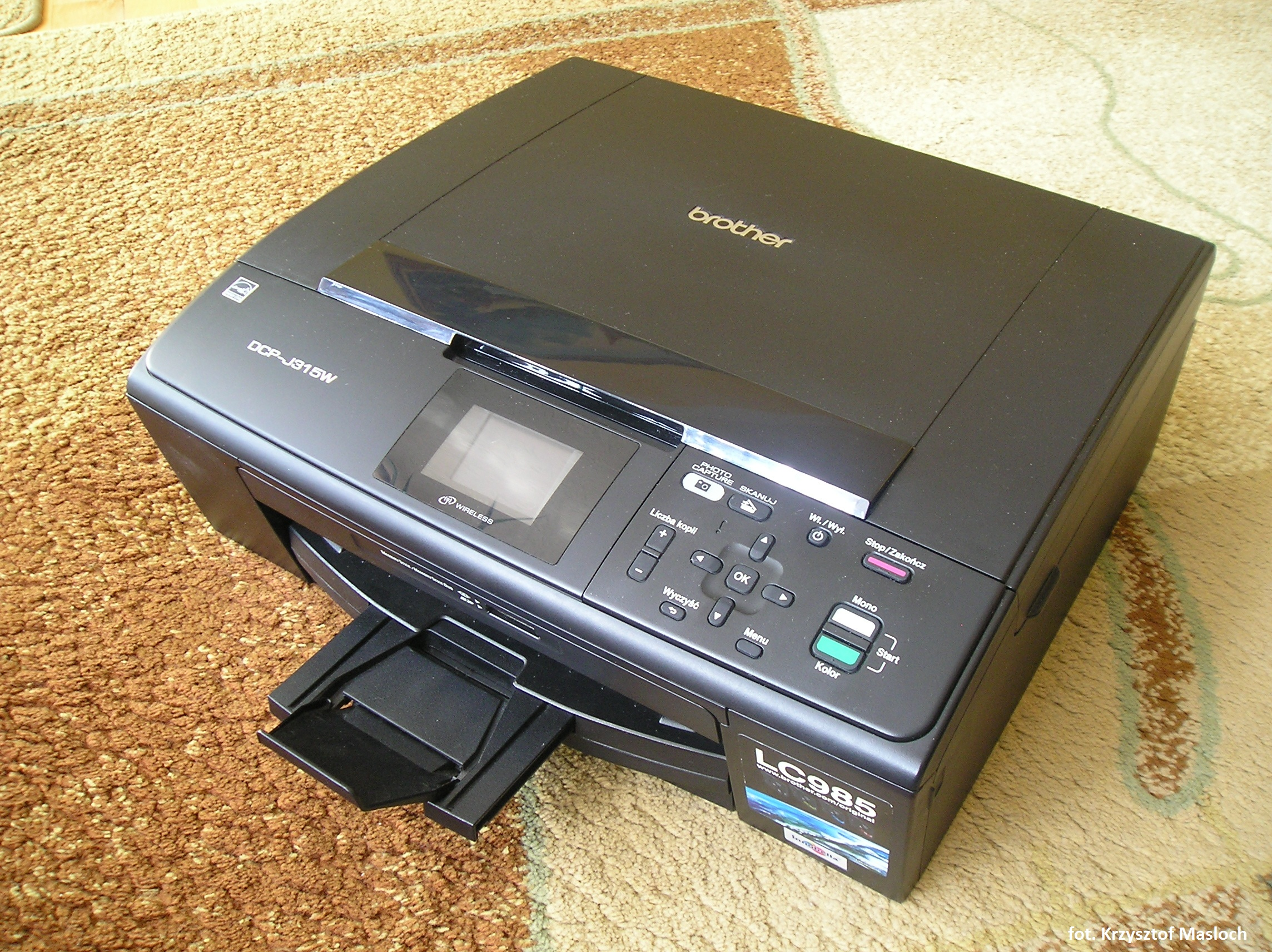
Wireless multifunction printer Brother DCP-J315W

Brother diversified into manufacturing printers, label printers, MFCs, garment printers, music sequencers, manufacturing/machine tools, Joysound karaokes in the 1960s and calculators in the 1970s.

By 2025, Brother produced some of the best (as determined by Consumer Reports) inkjet and laser printers on the market.

Brother Industries, for an unknown period of time, produced many different word processor machines, but there is hardly any information backed up online regarding these products.

== Advertising and sponsorship ==
Brother sponsored Manchester City Football Club from 1987 until 1999, which is one of the longest unbroken sponsorship deals of any English football club.

Brother launched their first integrated, pan-European advertising campaign in Autumn 2010 for their A3 printer range. Titled '141%', referring to the ratio between paper sizes A3 and A4.

In 2019 Brother's UK subsidiary became co-sponsor of the Vitus Pro Cycling Team, with the team's name officially becoming "Vitus Pro Cycling Team, Powered By Brother UK".

In 2019, Brother announced its co-sponsorship of the Japan Pavilion at the Expo 2020 in UAE.

In 2024, Brother sponsored WorldSkills Lyon 2024.

== Research and manufacturing locations ==
- Mizuho Factory (Mizuho Ward, Nagoya)
- Hoshizaki Factory (Minami Ward, Nagoya)
- Minato Factory (Minato Ward, Nagoya)
- Momozono Factory (Mizuho Ward, Nagoya)
- Kariya Factory (Kariya City, Aichi Prefecture)
- Technology Development Center (Mizuho Ward, Nagoya)
- Logistics center (Minami Ward, Nagoya)

Overseas headquarters are located in the following countries.

- Taiwan (1 location)
- Malaysia (1 location)
- China (6 locations)
- Vietnam (1 location)
- United Kingdom (2 locations)
- Slovakia (1 location)
- United States (1 location)

== Philanthropy ==
In 2017, Brother donated US$50,000 to the American Red Cross in response to damage caused by Hurricane Harvey.

In 2018, Brother donated ¥100 million towards relief efforts following the 2018 Indonesia earthquake.

In 2021, Brother Industries donated €110,000 to the German Red Cross and other organisations in response to damage caused by the 2021 European floods, while Brother International (Belgium) donated €10,000 to the Belgian Red Cross.

In 2022, Brother donated €500,000 to UNHCR to support its humanitarian relief efforts in Ukraine and neighboring countries. Later that year, Brother donated ¥2,000,000 to the non-profit organisation Japan Platform in response to the 2022 Pakistan Floods.

In 2023, Brother donated ¥2 million to the non-profit corporation Doctors Without Borders/Médecins Sans Frontières (MSF) to support people affected by the 2023 Afghanistan earthquake.

== See also ==
- List of sewing machine brands
- List of printer companies
