= Stalybridge Mill, Stalybridge =

Cotton mill in Greater Manchester, England

- The mill before 1951

- Location in Greater Manchester

Spinning (ring mill)
- Location: Bridge St, Stalybridge, Tameside, Greater Manchester, England
- Serving canal: Huddersfield Narrow Canal
- Serving railway: Lancashire and Yorkshire Railway
- Owner: Stalybridge Cotton Mill Co. Ltd
- Further ownership: Lancashire Cotton Corporation (1930s); Courtaulds (1964)
- Coordinates: 53.4823°N 2.0643°W

Power
- Date: 1868 (1) 1925? (2)
- Engine maker: Goodfellow and Matthews (1); Scott & Hodgson Ltd (2)
- Engine type: twin tandem compound engine
- Valve Gear: Corliss (1) Corliss HP, slide LP (2)
- Cylinder diameter and throw: Two 22"HP and two 42"LP X 6ft stroke.
- rpm: 55
- Installed horse power (ihp): 1000 (1) 1600 (2)
- Transmission type: ropes
- No. of ropes: 27

Boiler configuration
- Boilers: Four Lancashire, coal fired
- Pressure: 80psi (1) 120psi (2)

Equipment
- Ring Frames path: 75,000 spindles (1887); 87,000 spindles (1891)

Stalybridge Mill, Stalybridge is a cotton spinning mill in Stalybridge, Tameside, Greater Manchester, England. It was built in 1868, and the engine reconfigured in around 1925. It was taken over by the Lancashire Cotton Corporation in the 1930s and passed to Courtaulds in 1964.

== Location ==
Stalybridge is a town in the Metropolitan Borough of Tameside in Greater Manchester, England. It lies on the course of the River Tame and the Huddersfield canal, on undulating land in the foothills of the Pennines. Historically a part of Cheshire, it is 9 miles (14.5 km) east of Manchester city centre and 6 miles (9.7 km) northwest of Glossop. The road from Oldham, to the pennine passes: the Snake pass and Woodhead, bridges the river at this point. Stalybridge was the junction of three early railway companies. The Ashton, Stalybridge and Liverpool Junction Railway Company was formed on 19 July 1844 and the railway was connected to Stalybridge on 5 October 1846. On 9 July 1847 the company was acquired by the Lancashire and Yorkshire Railway. On 1 August 1849 the Manchester, Stockport and Leeds Railway connected Stalybridge to Huddersfield and later to Stockport. This line later became part of the London and North Western Railway.

== History ==
Farming and woollen spinning were the main means subsistence before the construction of a cotton mill in 1776, Stalybridge became one of the first centres of textile manufacture during the Industrial Revolution. The 19th-century wealth of the town was built on the factory-based cotton industry, transforming an area of scattered farms and homesteads into a self-confident town.

The 1776 mill was first water-powered; built at Rassbottom for carding and spinning cotton. In 1789 the town's first spinning mill using the principle of Arkwright's Water-Frame was built. By 1793 steam power had been introduced to the Stalybridge cotton industry and by 1803 there were eight cotton mills in the growing town containing 76,000 spindles. There was opposition and serious disturbances in town between November 1811 and April 1812 during the Luddites uprising. The social unrest did not curb the growth of Stalybridge. By 1814 there were twelve factories and by 1818 the number had increased to sixteen. When the Chartist petition was rejected, the ensuing disturbances known as the Plug Riots started in Stalybridge.

Stalybridge mill was built in 1868, during the first joint-stock company boom immediately after the cotton famine had ended.

The industry peaked in 1912 when it produced 8 billion yards of cloth. The Great War of 1914–18 halted the supply of raw cotton, and the British government encouraged its colonies to build mills to spin and weave cotton. The war over, Lancashire never regained its markets. The independent mills were struggling. The Bank of England set up the Lancashire Cotton Corporation in 1929 to attempt to rationalise and save the industry. Stalybridge Mill, Stalybridge was one of 104 mills bought by the LCC, and one of the 53 mills that survived through to 1950.

== Architecture ==
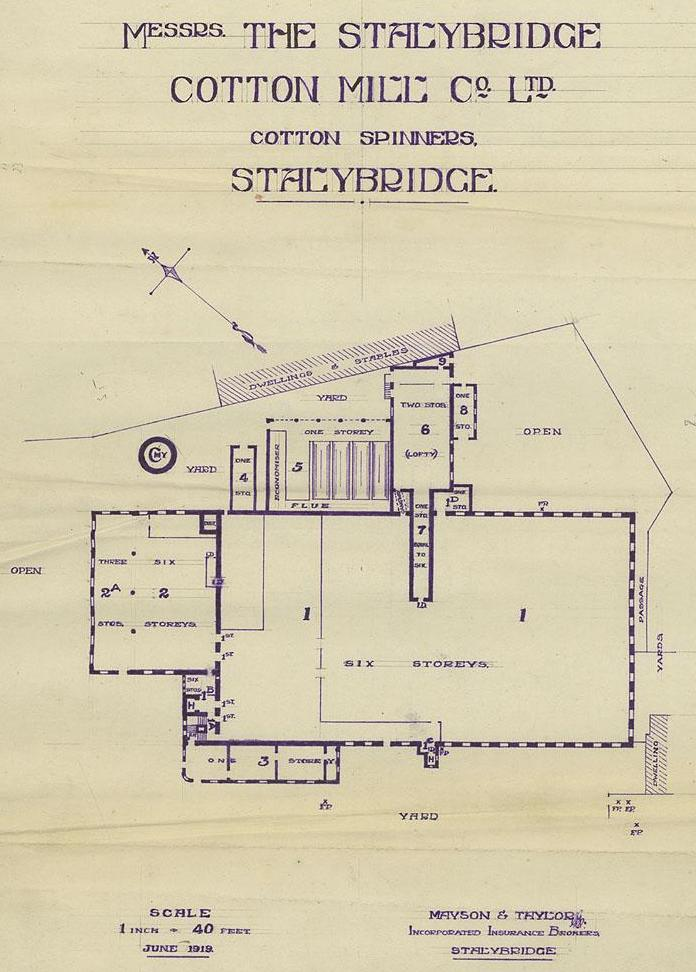

This was a six-storey mill, with a centrally placed engine and rope race. There was one six-storey extension, and a three-storey extension on the same wall as the water tower.

=== Power ===
It was originally driven by 1000 hp twin tandem compound engine by Goodfellow and Matthews built in 1868. It had a 30-foot flywheel with 27 ropes, which operated at 55rpm. It had two 22"HP and two 42"LP cylinders with a 6-foot stroke. The air pumps were driven by lever from crossheads with guides between HP and LP cylinders. This had Corliss valves on all cylinders and was steamed at 80psi. The HP cylinders were to the front.

It was rebuilt in 1925(?) by Scott & Hodgson as a 1600 hp engine. This engine had slide valves on the LP which were now at the front. The HP cylinders had Corliss valves; they were steamed at 120psi, by four Lancashire boilers, An economiser was used. Marine type connecting rods and trunk guides were fitted.

=== Equipment ===
It operated 75,000 spindles in 1887, rising in 1891 to 87,000 spindles, 348/388 twist, 408/528 weft. In 1951, it was an all ring mill doing coarse counts

== Usage ==
=== Owners ===
- Stalybridge Cotton Mill Co. Ltd.
- Lancashire Cotton Corporation (1930's-1964)
- Courtaulds (1964-)

== See also ==
- Textile manufacturing

== Bibliography ==
- Dunkerley, Philip (2009). "Dunkerley-Tuson Family Website, The Regent Cotton Mill, Failsworth". Archived from the original on 23 March 2008.
- LCC (1951). The mills and organisation of the Lancashire Cotton Corporation Limited. Blackfriars House, Manchester: Lancashire Cotton Corporation Limited.
- Roberts, A S (1921), "Arthur Robert's Engine List", Arthur Roberts Black Book., One guy from Barlick-Book Transcription, archived from the original on 23 July 2011
