= Falastin Street =

One of Baghdad city roads

Palestine Street Arabic: شارع فلسطين
- Falastin Street
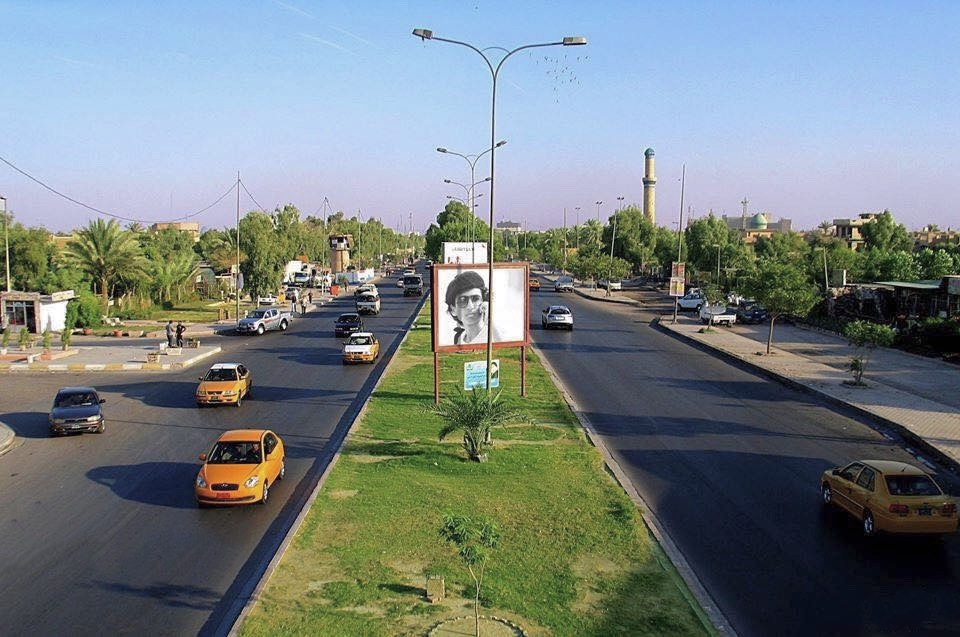
- Interactive map of Palestine Street; Arabic: شارع فلسطين
- Native name: شارع فلسطين
- Type: Street
- Location: Baghdad, Iraq
- South end: Mustansiriya Square
- Major junctions: Beirut Square
- North end: Maysalon Square

Construction
- Construction start: 1960s

Other
- Known for: al-Shaheed Monument, commercial and shopping hub
- Status: Active

Palestine Street or Falastin Street (Arabic: شارع فلسطين) is a street located in eastern Baghdad, Iraq. It runs parallel and to the west of Army Canal between Mustanssiriya square, through Beirut square to Maysalon square, in the neighborhoods of Mustansiriya, Nile, al-Muthanna to the west and 14 July, al-Idrisi, the al-Shaheed Monument, and Al-Muthanna to the east.

The street was established in the 1960s when the government started a plan to extend Baghdad by adding new neighborhoods.

The Palestine Street area has witnessed many recent reconstruction efforts, whereby many trees were planted by Baghdad municipality, and fountains and playgrounds were constructed. Palestinian Street is the leading commercial and shopping center in eastern Baghdad.
