= Canal =

Artificial channel for water

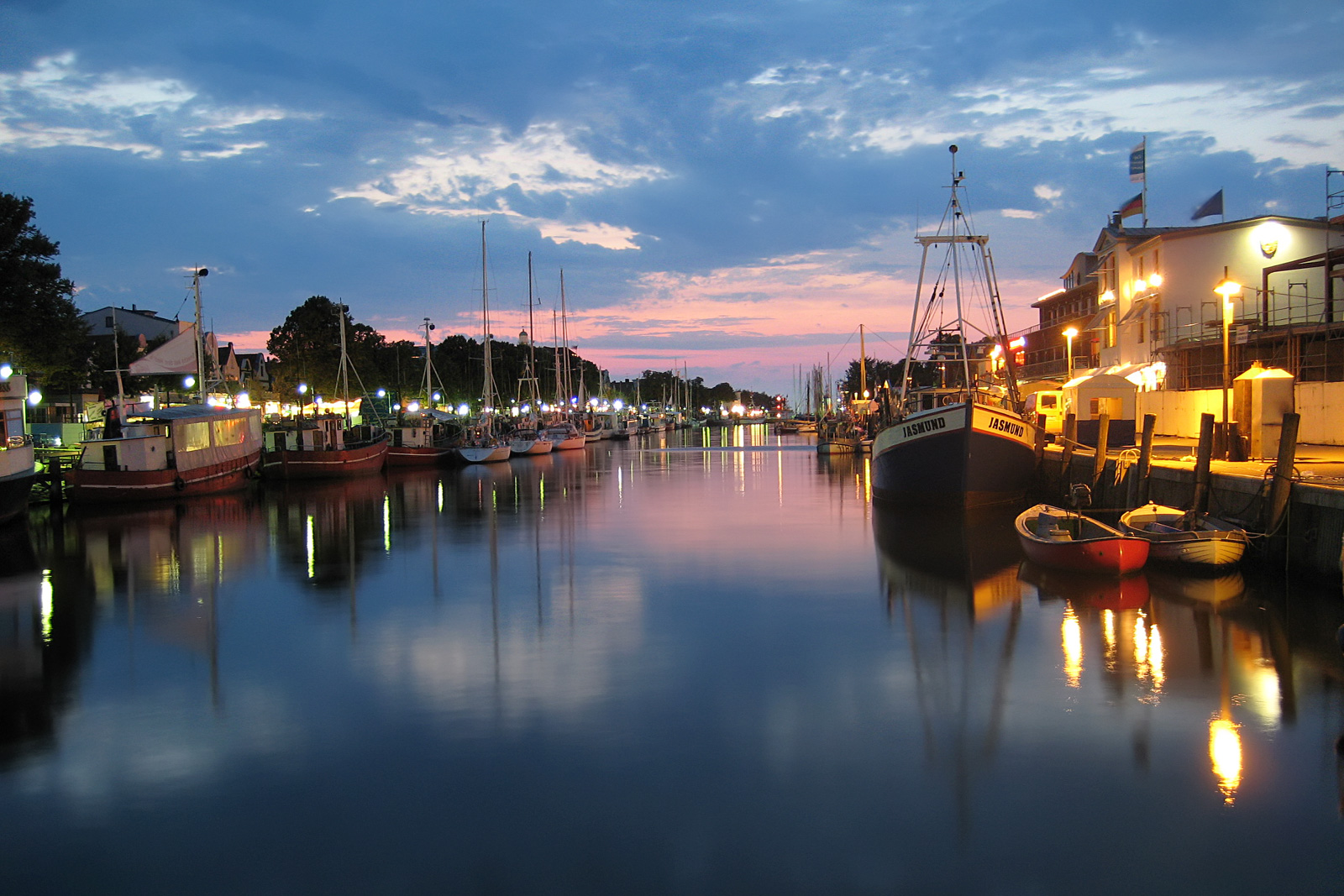
The Alter Strom, in the sea resort of Warnemünde, Germany

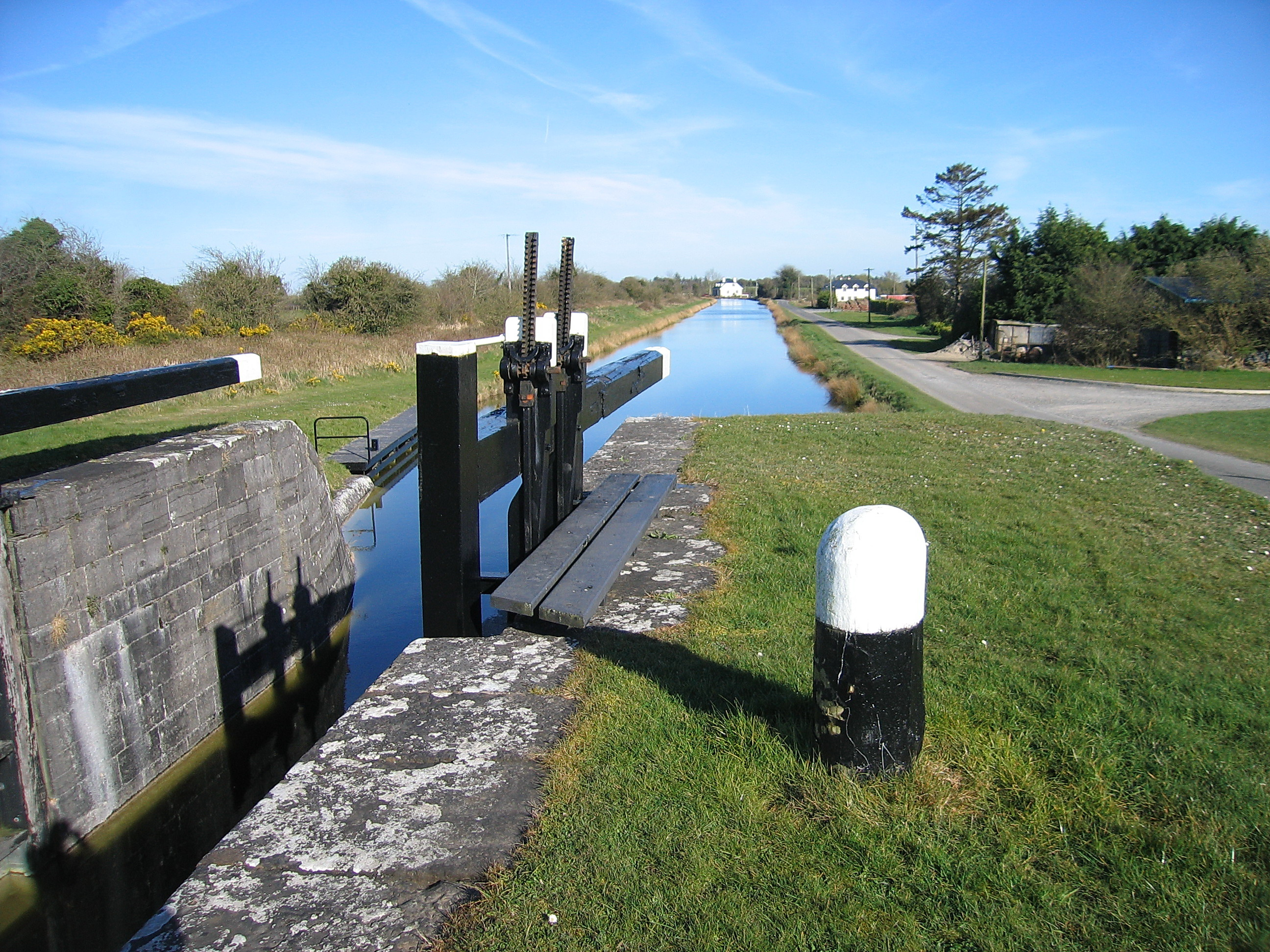
The Royal Canal in Ireland

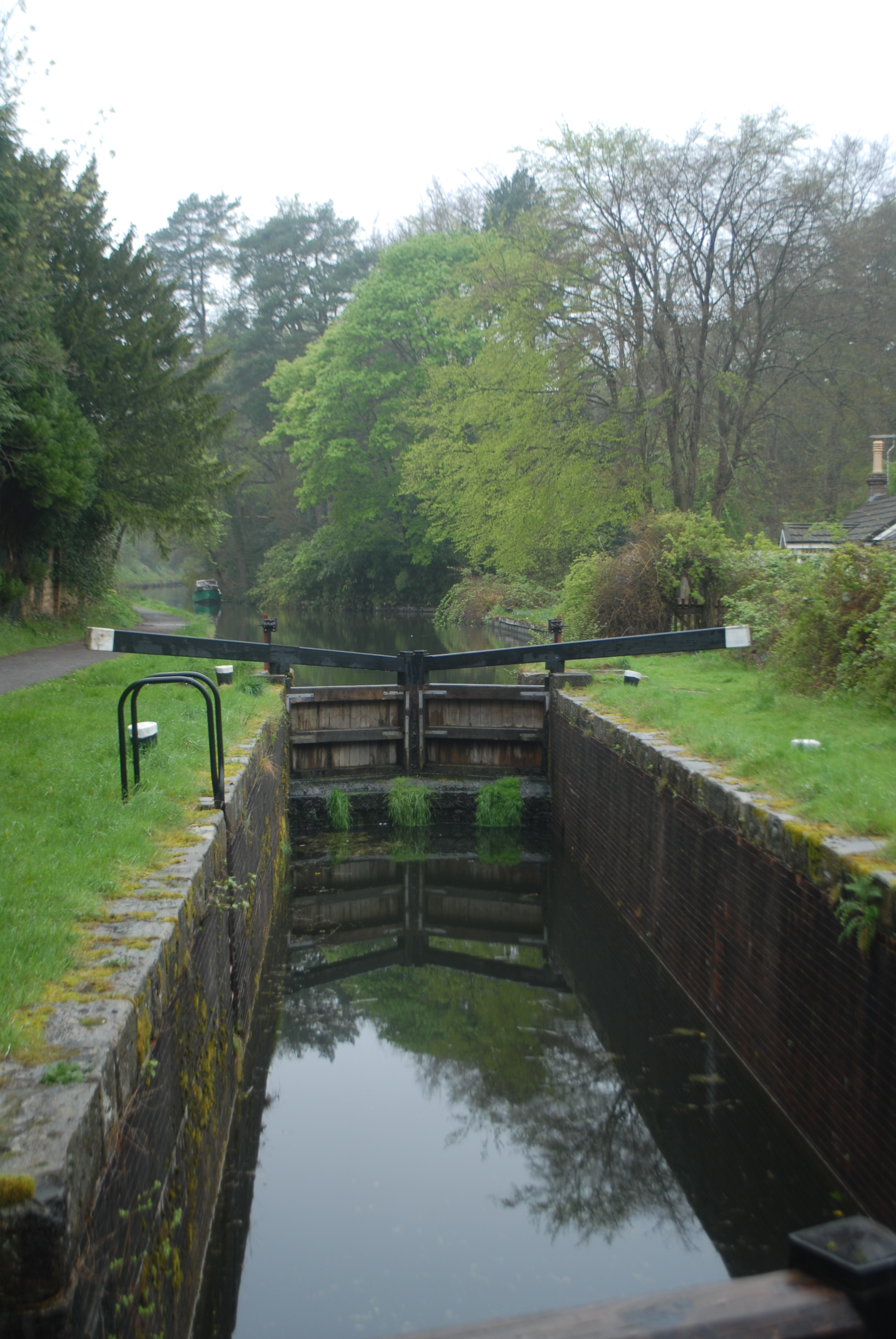
Small boat canals such as the Basingstoke Canal fuelled the Industrial Revolution in much of Europe and the United States.

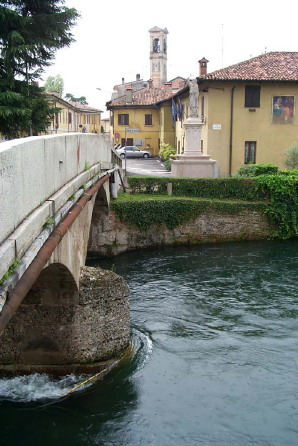
Bridge on the Naviglio Grande, in the town of Cassinetta di Lugagnano, in Italy

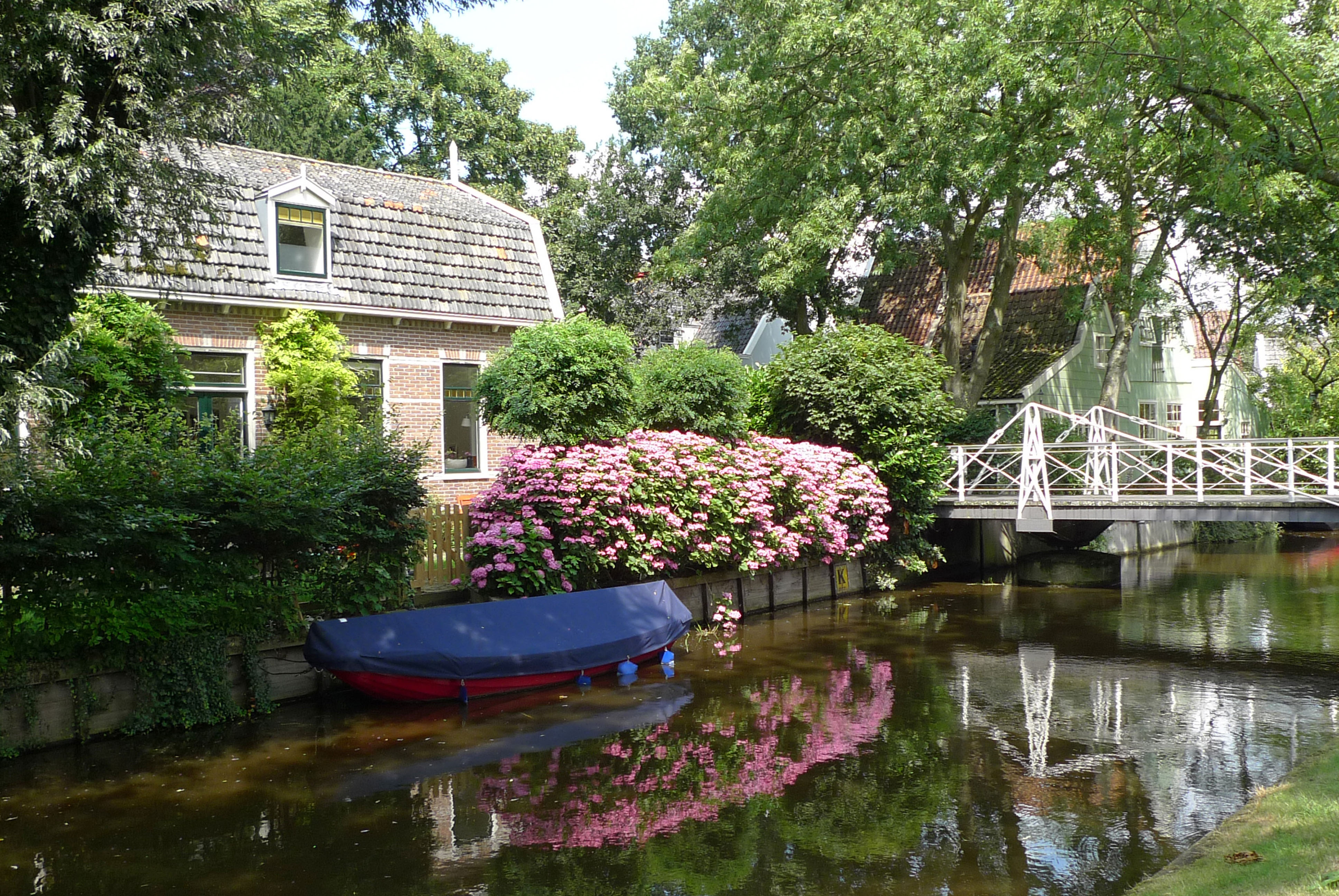
Canal in Broek in Waterland, Netherlands

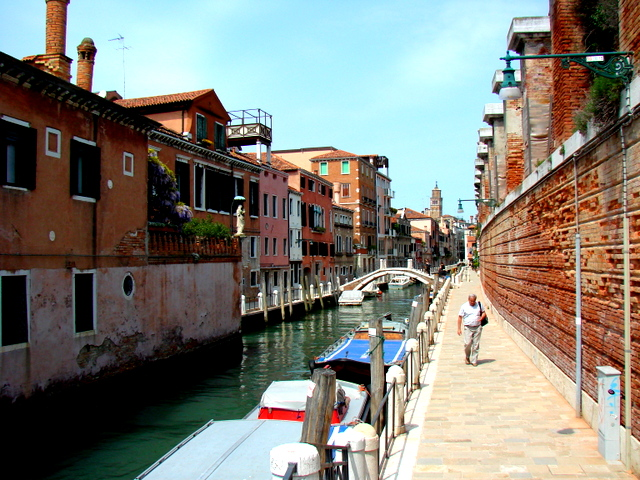
Canal in Venice

Canals or artificial waterways are waterways or engineered channels built for drainage management (e.g. flood control and irrigation) or for conveyancing water transport vehicles (e.g. water taxi). They carry free, calm surface flow under atmospheric pressure, and can be thought of as artificial rivers.

In most cases, a canal has a series of dams and locks that create reservoirs of low speed current flow. These reservoirs are referred to as slack water levels, often just called levels. A canal can be called a navigation canal when it parallels a natural river and shares part of the latter's discharges and drainage basin, and leverages its resources by building dams and locks to increase and lengthen its stretches of slack water levels while staying in its valley.

A canal can cut across a drainage divide atop a ridge, generally requiring an external water source above the highest elevation. The best-known example of such a canal is the Panama Canal.

Many canals have been built at elevations, above valleys and other waterways. Canals with sources of water at a higher level can deliver water to a destination such as a city where water is needed. The Roman Empire's aqueducts were such water supply canals.

The term was once used to describe certain linear features on the surface of Mars, though modern imaging has shown this to be a misnomer.

== Types of artificial waterways ==
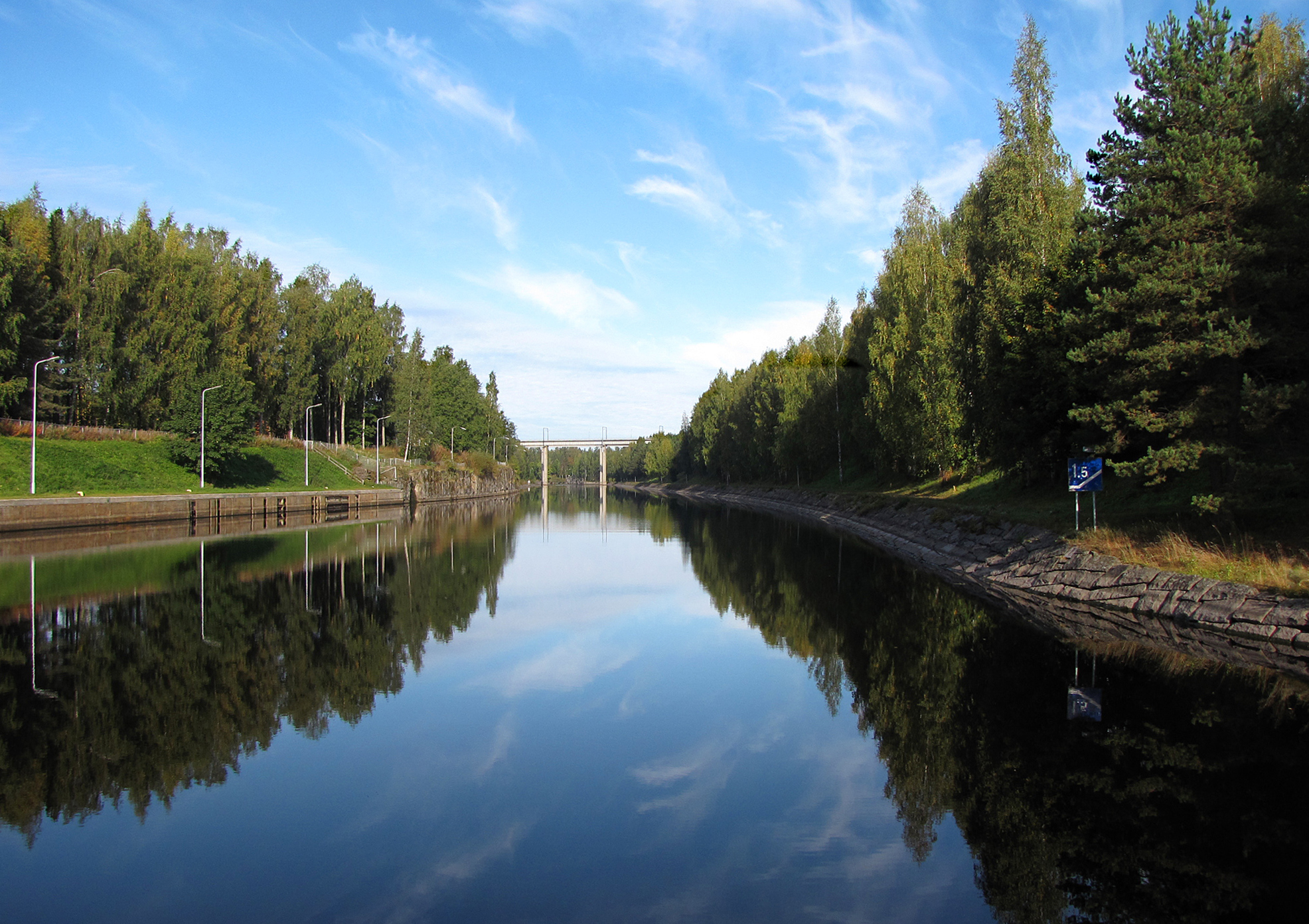
Saimaa Canal, a transportation canal between Finland and Russia, in Lappeenranta

A navigation is a series of channels that run roughly parallel to the valley and stream bed of an unimproved river. A navigation always shares the drainage basin of the river. A vessel uses the calm parts of the river itself as well as improvements, traversing the same changes in height.

A true canal is a channel that cuts across a drainage divide, making a navigable channel connecting two different drainage basins.

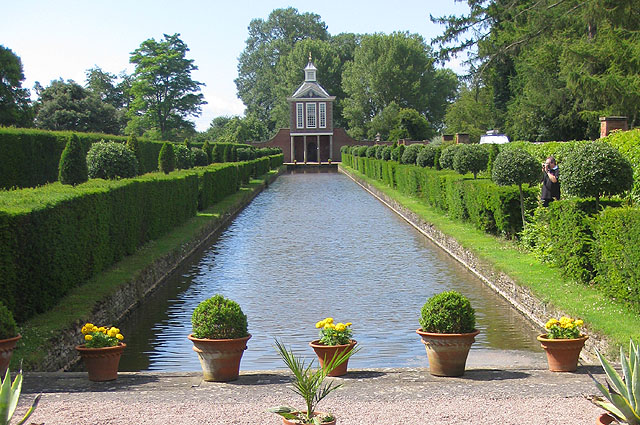
Westbury Court Garden: the garden "Canal"

== Structures used in artificial waterways ==
Both navigations and canals use engineered structures to improve navigation:

- weirs and dams to raise river water levels to usable depths;
- looping descents to create a longer and gentler channel around a stretch of rapids or falls;
- locks to allow ships and barges to ascend and descend.

Since they cut across drainage divides, rather than following the natural water level, true canals are more difficult to construct and often need additional improvements, such as viaducts and aqueducts.

== Types of canals ==
There are two broad types of canals:

- Waterways: canals and navigations used for carrying vessels transporting goods and people. These can be subdivided into two kinds:

- Those connecting existing lakes, rivers, other canals or seas and oceans.
- Those connected in a city network: such as the Canal Grande and others of Venice; the grachten of Amsterdam or Utrecht, and the waterways of Bangkok.

- Aqueducts: water supply canals that are used for the conveyance and delivery of potable water, municipal uses, hydro power canals and agriculture irrigation.

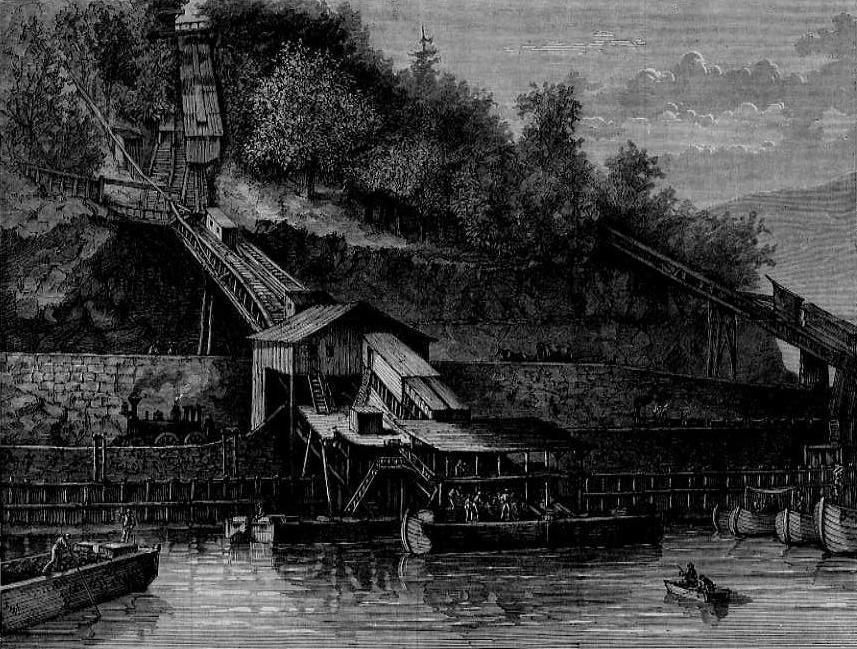
Loading Anthracite on the Lehigh Canal to feed the early United States industries in the pioneer-era

1. Design High Water Level (HWL) 2. Low water channel 3. Flood channel 4. Riverside slope 5. Riverside banquette 6. Levee crown 7. Landside slope 8. Landside banquette 9. Berm 10. Low water revetment 11. Riverside land 12. Levee 13. Protected lowland 14. River zone

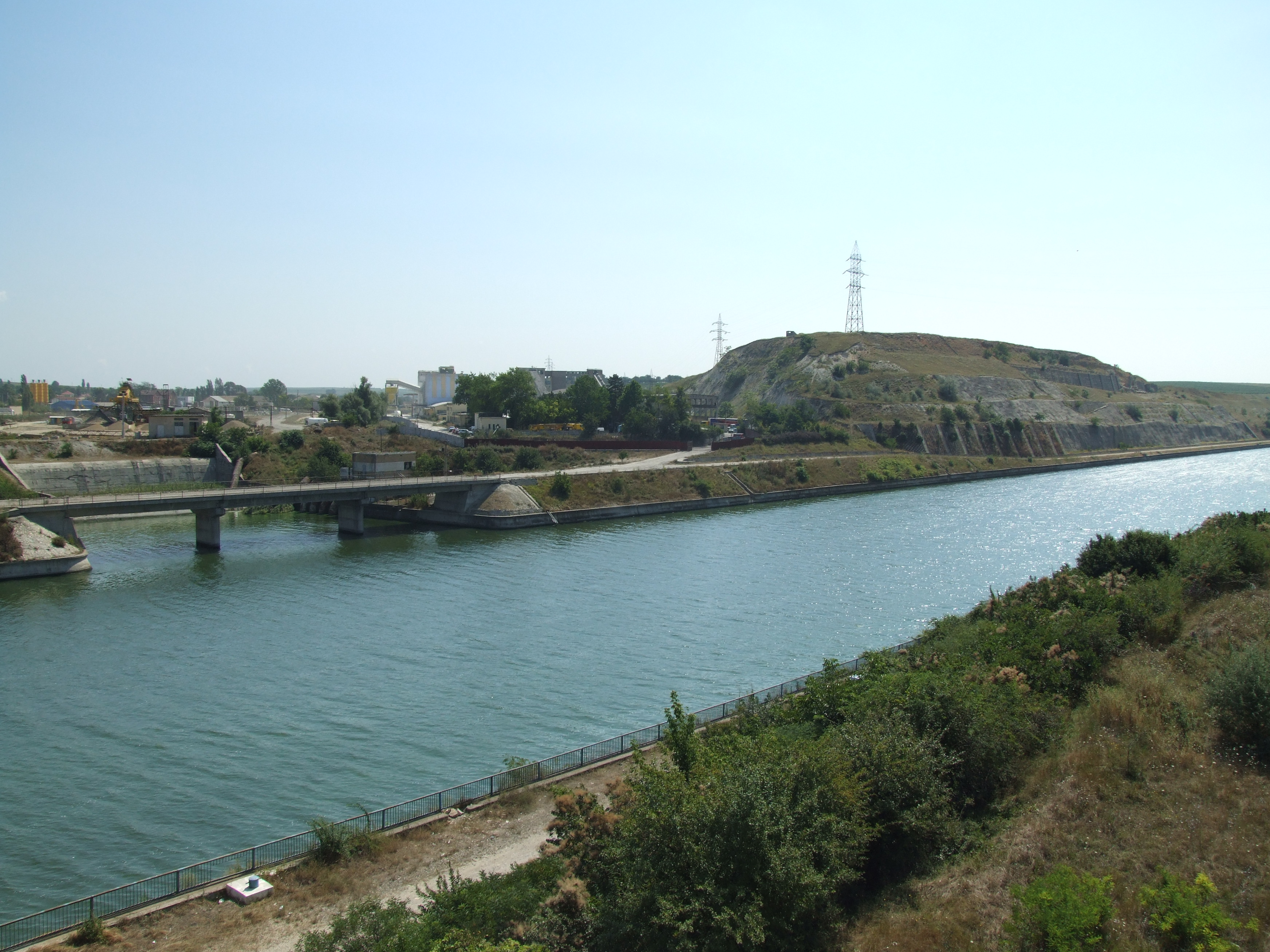
The Danube-Black Sea Canal in Romania

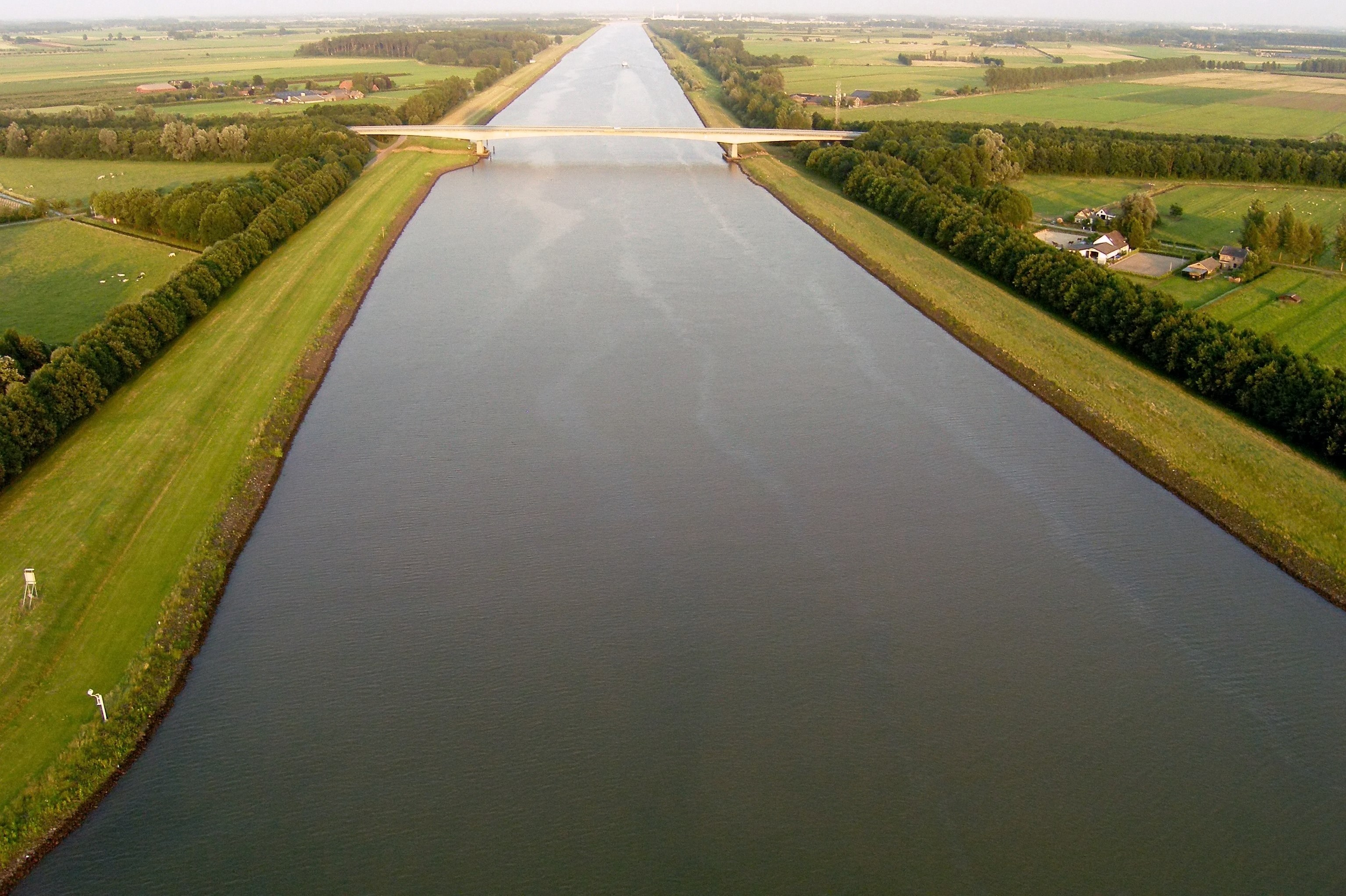
The Amsterdam-Rhine Canal near Rijswijk, Netherlands

== Importance ==
Historically, canals were of immense importance to the commerce, development, growth and vitality of a civilization. The movement of bulk raw materials such as coal and ores—practically a prerequisite for further urbanization and industrialization — were difficult and only marginally affordable to move without water transport. The movement of bulk raw materials, facilitated by canals, fueled the Industrial Revolution, leading to new research disciplines, new industries and economies of scale, raising the standard of living for industrialized societies.

The few canals still in operation in the 21st century are a fraction of the number that were once maintained during the earlier part of the Industrial Revolution. Their replacement was gradual, beginning first in the United Kingdom in the 1840s, where canal shipping was first augmented and later superseded by the much faster, less geographically constrained, and generally cheaper to maintain railway system.

By the early 1880s, many canals could not compete with rail transport and were abandoned. In the 20th century, oil was increasingly the heating fuel of choice, and the volume of coal shipments began to decrease. After the First World War, technological advances in motor trucks as well as expanding road networks saw increasing amounts of freight being transported by road, and the last small US barge canals saw a steady decline in cargo ton-miles.

The once critical smaller inland waterways conceived and engineered as boat and barge canals have largely been supplanted and filled in, abandoned and left to deteriorate, or kept in service under a park service and staffed by government employees, where dams and locks are maintained for flood control or pleasure boating. Today, most ship canals (intended for larger, oceangoing vessels) primarily service bulk cargo and large ship transportation industries.

The longest extant canal today, the Grand Canal in northern China, still remains in heavy use, especially the portion south of the Yellow River. It stretches from Beijing to Hangzhou at 1,794 kilometres (1,115 miles).

== Construction ==
Canals are built in one of three ways, or a combination of the three, depending on available water and available path:

Human made streams

- A canal can be created where no stream presently exists. Either the body of the canal is dug or the sides of the canal are created by making dykes or levees by piling dirt, stone, concrete or other building materials. The finished shape of the canal as seen in cross section is known as the canal prism. The water for the canal must be provided from an external source, like streams or reservoirs. Where the new waterway must change elevation engineering works like locks, lifts or elevators are constructed to raise and lower vessels. Examples include canals that connect valleys over a higher body of land, like Canal du Midi, Canal de Briare and the Panama Canal.
- A canal can be constructed by dredging a channel in the bottom of an existing lake. When the channel is complete, the lake is drained and the channel becomes a new canal, serving both drainage of the surrounding polder and providing transport there. Examples include the Lage Vaart. One can also build two parallel dikes in an existing lake, forming the new canal in between, and then drain the remaining parts of the lake. The eastern and central parts of the North Sea Canal were constructed in this way. In both cases pumping stations are required to keep the land surrounding the canal dry, either pumping water from the canal into surrounding waters, or pumping it from the land into the canal.

Canalization and navigations

- A stream can be canalized to make its navigable path more predictable and easier to maneuver. Canalization modifies the stream to carry traffic more safely by controlling the flow of the stream by dredging, damming and modifying its path. This frequently includes the incorporation of locks and spillways, that make the river a navigation. Examples include the Lehigh Canal in Northeastern Pennsylvania's coal Region, Basse Saône, Canal de Mines de Fer de la Moselle, and canal Aisne. Riparian zone restoration may be required.

Lateral canals

- When a stream is too difficult to modify with canalization, a second stream can be created next to or at least near the existing stream. This is called a lateral canal, and may meander in a large horseshoe bend or series of curves some distance from the source waters stream bed lengthening the effective length in order to lower the ratio of rise over run (slope or pitch). The existing stream usually acts as the water source and the landscape around its banks provide a path for the new body. Examples include the Chesapeake and Ohio Canal, Canal latéral à la Loire, Garonne Lateral Canal, Welland Canal and Juliana Canal.

Smaller transportation canals can carry barges or narrowboats, while ship canals allow seagoing ships to travel to an inland port (e.g., Manchester Ship Canal), or from one sea or ocean to another (e.g., Caledonian Canal, Panama Canal).

== Features ==
At their simplest, canals consist of a trench filled with water. Depending on the stratum the canal passes through, it may be necessary to line the cut with some form of watertight material such as clay or concrete. When this is done with clay, it is known as puddling.

Canals need to be level, and while small irregularities in the lie of the land can be dealt with through cuttings and embankments, for larger deviations other approaches have been adopted. The most common is the pound lock, which consists of a chamber within which the water level can be raised or lowered connecting either two pieces of canal at a different level or the canal with a river or the sea. When there is a hill to be climbed, flights of many locks in short succession may be used.

Prior to the development of the (double-gated) pound lock in 10th-century China and 15th-century Europe, vessels had to ascend and descend either with flash locks, consisting of a single gate, or with ramps, sometimes equipped with rollers. Flash locks were cumbersome and only usable where there was plenty of water available.

Cycling a lock uses a large amount of water, so builders have adopted other approaches for situations where little water is available. These include boat lifts, such as the Falkirk Wheel, which use a caisson of water in which boats float while being moved between two levels; and inclined planes where a caisson is hauled up a steep railway.

The crossing of a stream, road or valley, where the delay caused by a flight of locks at either side would be unacceptable, may be achieved by the construction of a navigable aqueduct, such as the Pontcysyllte Aqueduct (now a UNESCO World Heritage Site) across the valley of the River Dee in Wales.

Another option for dealing with hills is to tunnel through them. An example of this approach is the Harecastle Tunnel on the Trent and Mersey Canal. Tunnels are only practical for smaller canals.

Some canals attempted to keep changes in level down to a minimum. These canals known as contour canals would take longer, winding routes, along which the land was a uniform altitude. Other, generally later, canals took more direct routes requiring the use of various methods to deal with the change in level.

Canals have various features to tackle the problem of water supply. In cases, like the Suez Canal, the canal is open to the sea. Where the canal is not at sea level, a number of approaches have been adopted. Taking water from existing rivers or springs was an option in some cases, sometimes supplemented by other methods to deal with seasonal variations in flow. Where such sources were unavailable, reservoirs – either separate from the canal or built into its course – and back pumping were used to provide the required water. In other cases, water pumped from mines was used to feed the canal. In certain cases, extensive "feeder canals" were built to bring water from sources located far from the canal.

Where large amounts of goods are loaded or unloaded such as at the end of a canal, a canal basin may be built. This would normally be a section of water wider than the general canal. In some cases, the canal basins contain wharfs and cranes to assist with movement of goods.

When a section of the canal needs to be sealed off so it can be drained for maintenance stop planks are frequently used. These consist of planks of wood placed across the canal to form a dam. They are generally placed in pre-existing grooves in the canal bank. On more modern canals, "guard locks" or gates were sometimes placed to allow a section of the canal to be quickly closed off, either for maintenance, or to prevent a major loss of water due to a canal breach.

=== Canal falls ===
A canal fall, or canal drop, is a vertical drop in the canal bed. These are built when the natural ground slope is steeper than the desired canal gradient. They are constructed so the falling water's kinetic energy is dissipated in order to prevent it from scouring the bed and sides of the canal.

A canal fall is constructed by cut and fill. It may be combined with a regulator, bridge, or other structure to save costs.

There are various types of canal falls, based on their shape. One type is the ogee fall, where the drop follows an s-shaped curve to create a smooth transition and reduce turbulence. However, this smooth transition does not dissipate the water's kinetic energy, which leads to heavy scouring. As a result, the canal needs to be reinforced with concrete or masonry to protect it from eroding.

Another type of canal fall is the vertical fall, which is "simple and economical". These feature a "cistern", or depressed area just downstream from the fall, to "cushion" the water by providing a deep pool for its kinetic energy to be diffused in. Vertical falls work for drops of up to 1.5 m (5 ft) in height, and for discharge of up to 15 cubic metres per second (530 cu ft/s).

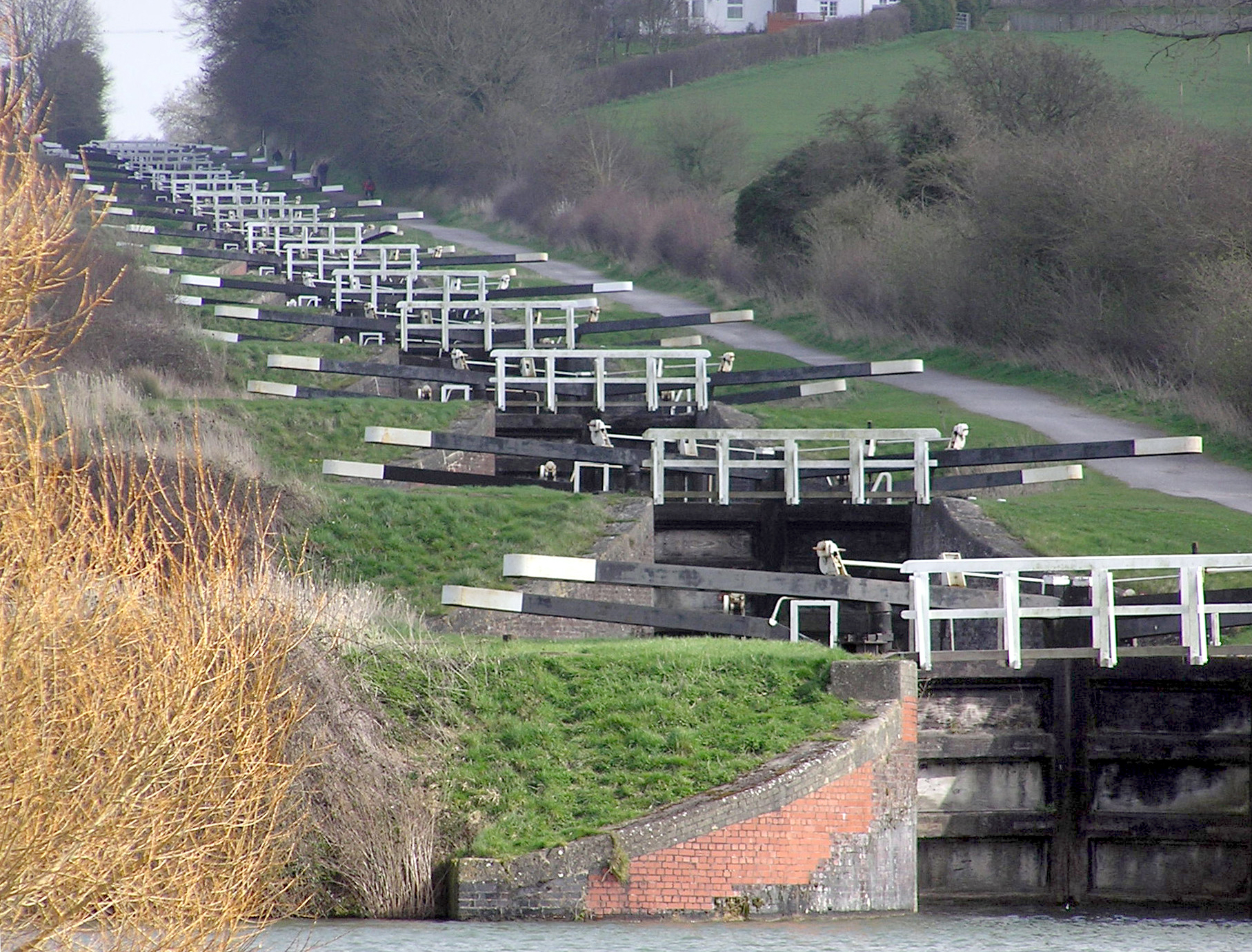
The flight of 16 consecutive locks at Caen Hill on the Kennet and Avon Canal, Wiltshire

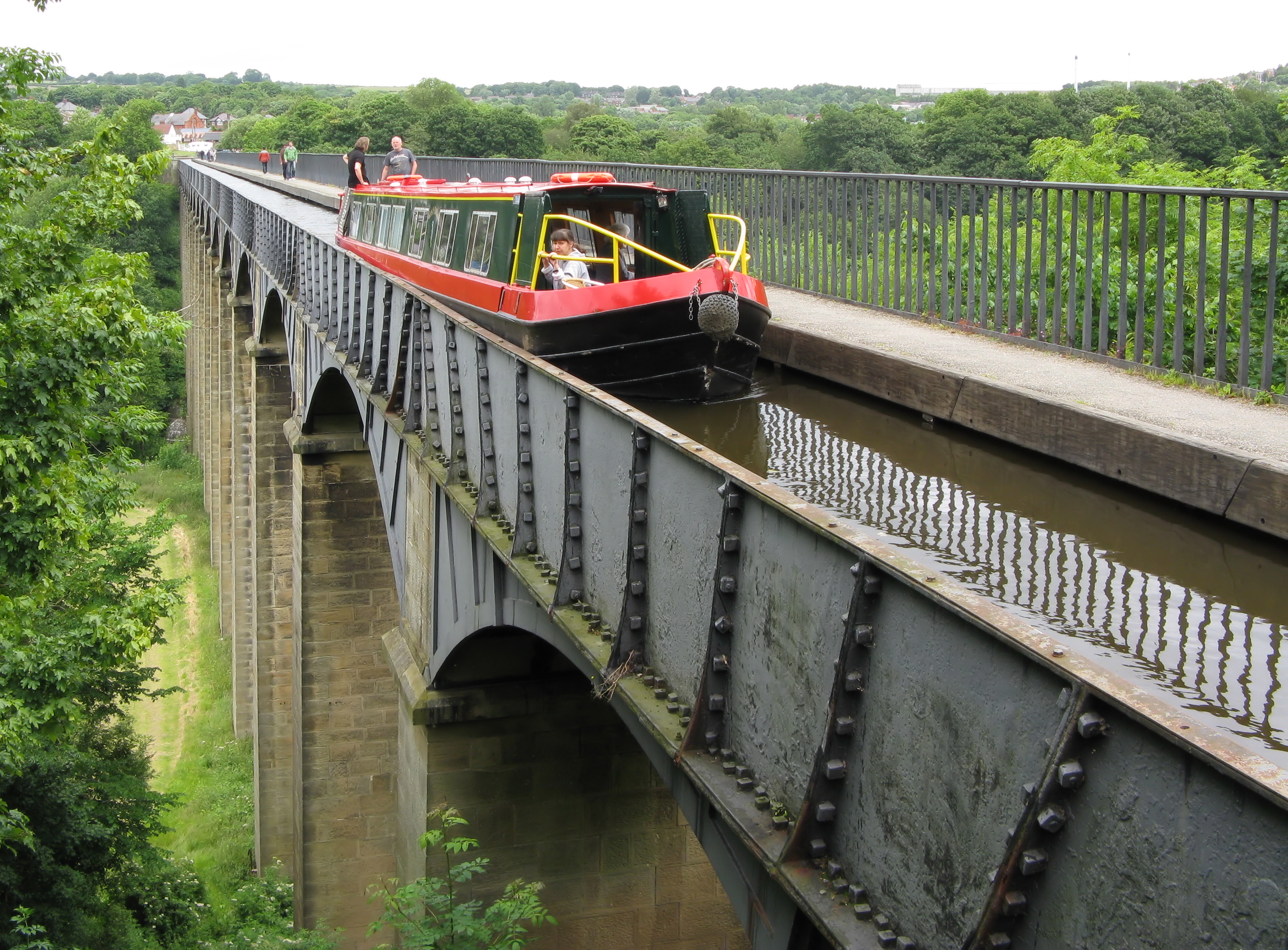
The Llangollen Canal traverses the longest and highest aqueduct in Wrexham, Wales, United Kingdom

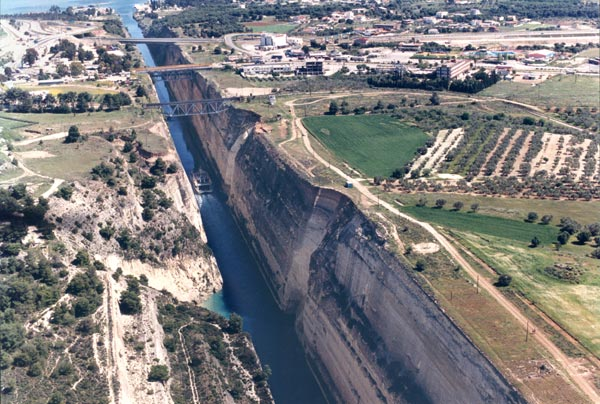
The Corinth Canal seen from the air

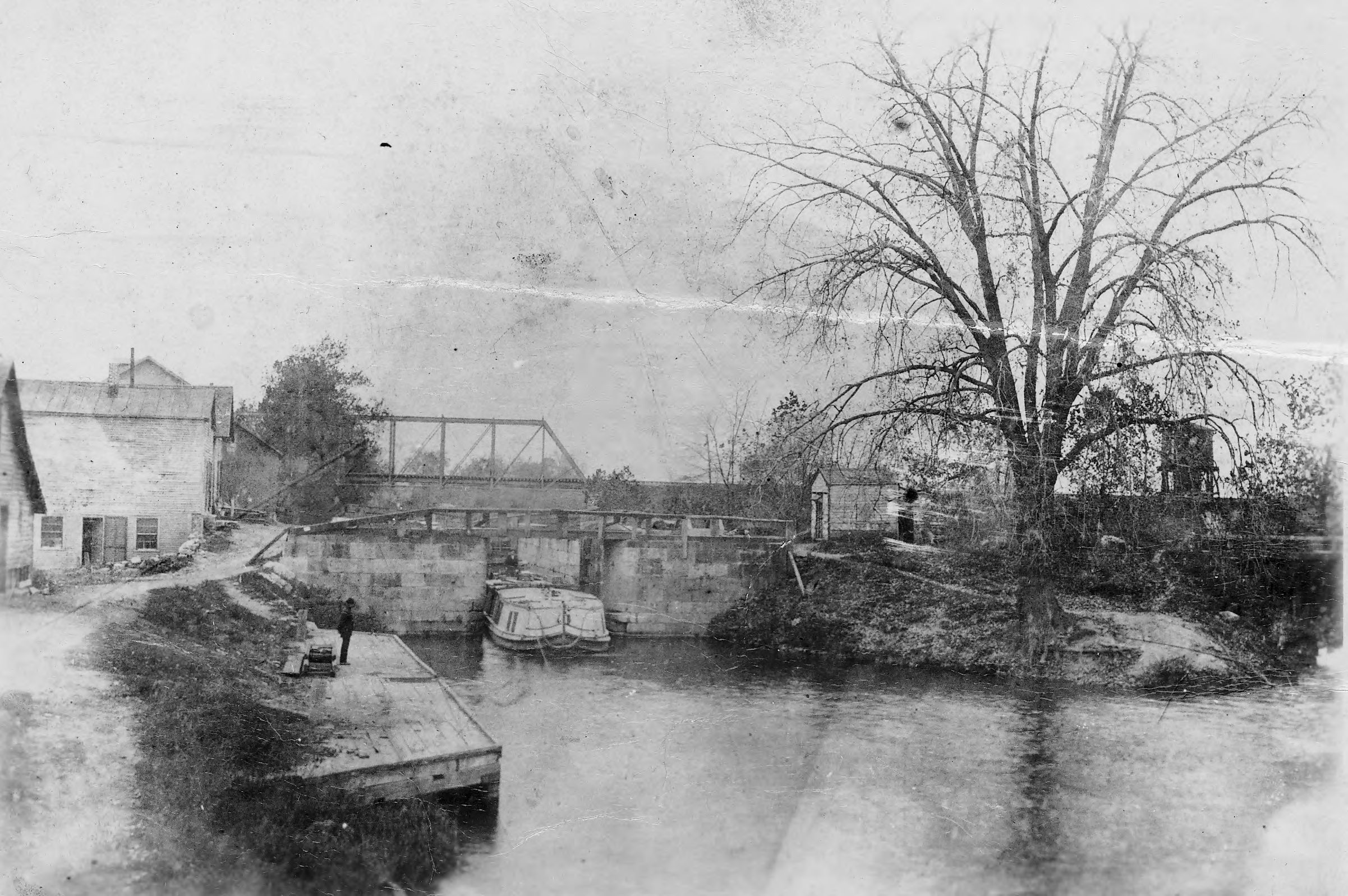
Miami and Erie Canal Lock in Ohio, United States

== History ==
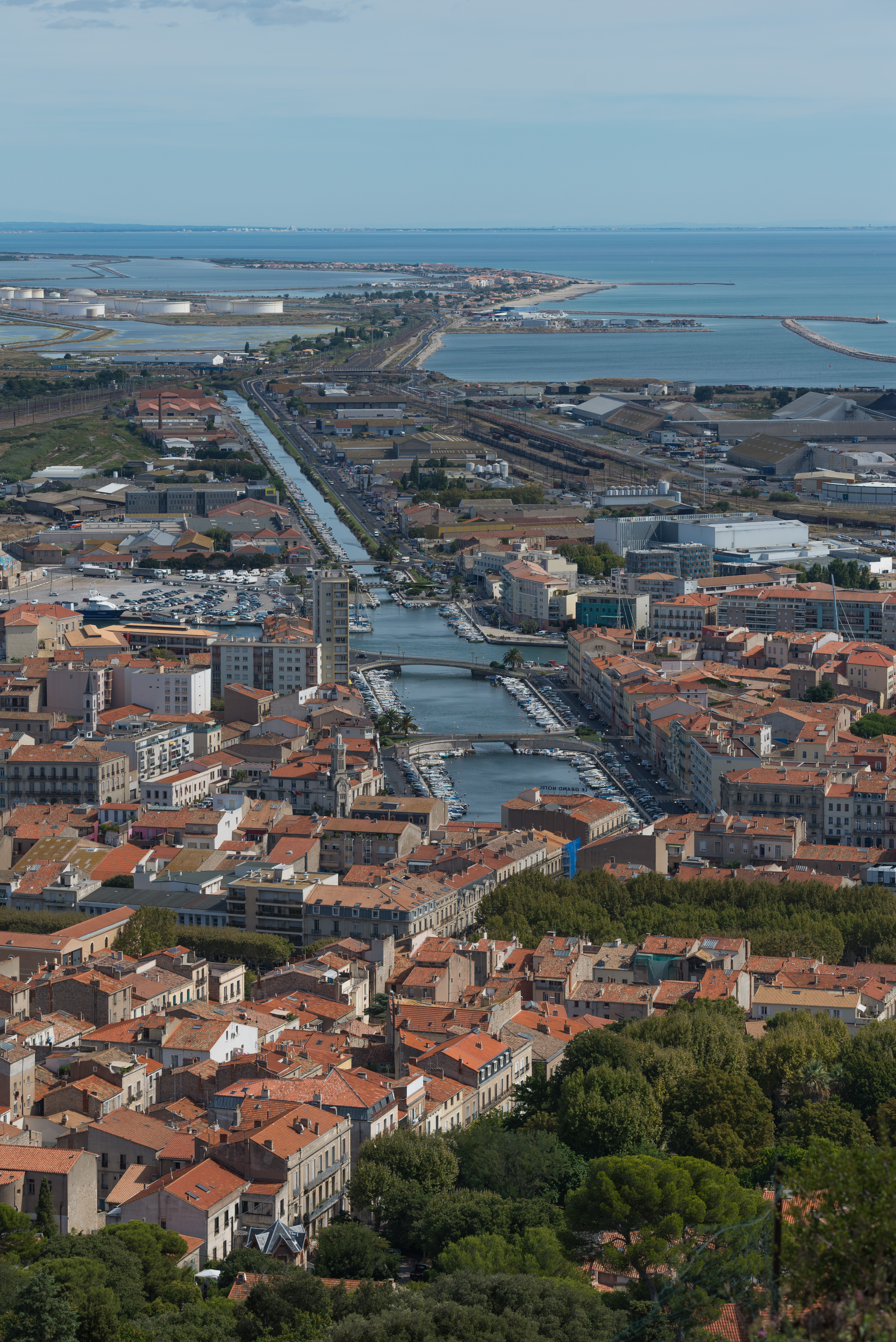
Canal in Sète, France

The transport capacity of pack animals and carts is limited. A mule can carry a 100-kilogram (250 lb) maximum load over a journey of several days or weeks, though much more for shorter distances and periods with appropriate rest. Besides, carts need roads. Transport over water is much more efficient and cost-effective for large cargoes.

=== Ancient canals ===
The oldest known canals were irrigation canals, built in Mesopotamia c. 4000 BC, in what is now Iraq. The Indus Valley civilization in what is now Pakistan and Northwestern India (c. 3000 BC) had sophisticated irrigation and storage systems developed, including the reservoirs built at Girnar in 3000 BC. This is the first time that such planned civil project had taken place in the ancient world. In Egypt, canals date back at least to the time of Pepi I Meryre (reigned 2332–2283 BC), who ordered a canal built to bypass the cataract on the Nile near Aswan.

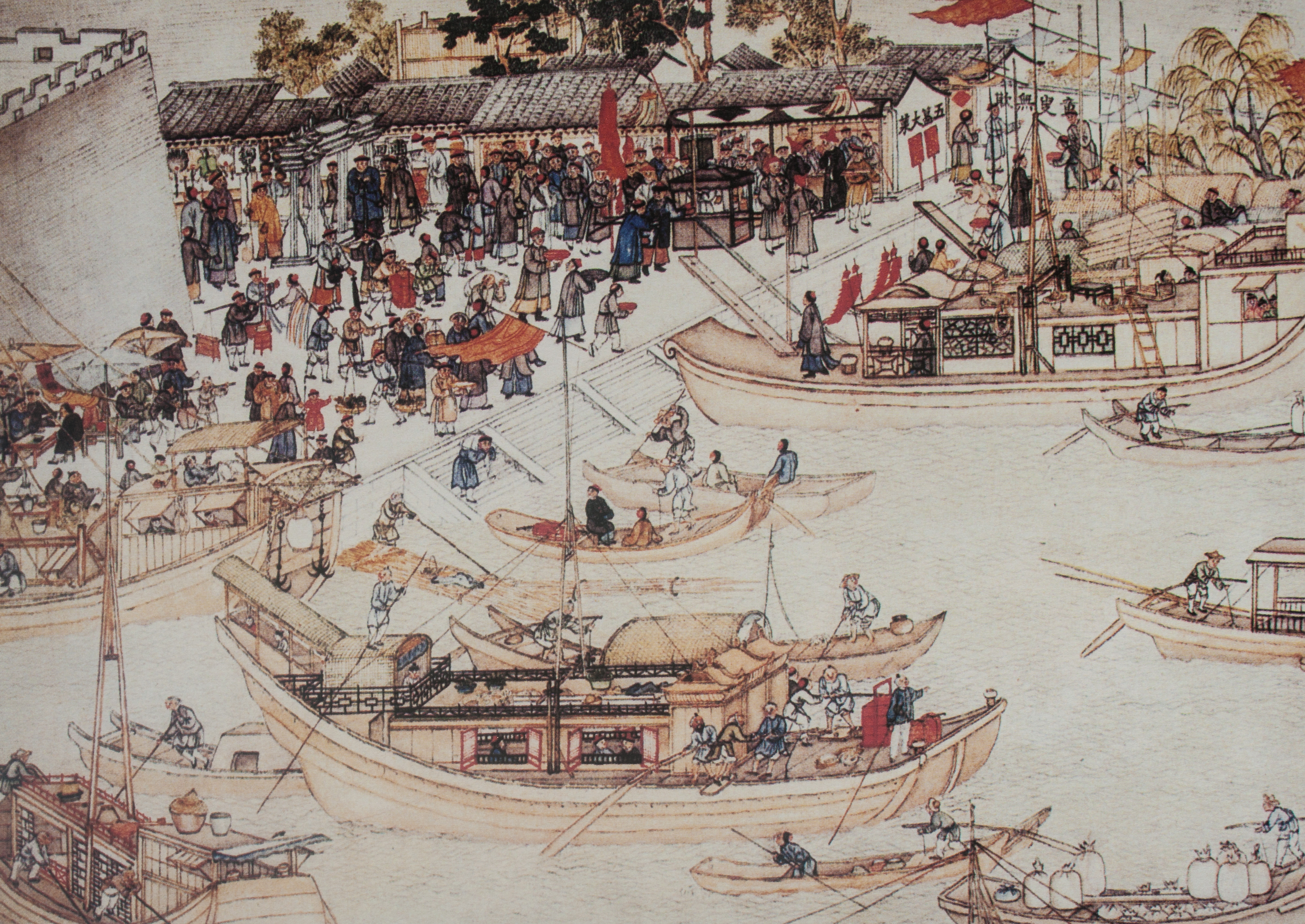
The Grand Canal of China at Suzhou

In ancient China, large canals for river transport were established as far back as the Spring and Autumn period (8th–5th centuries BC), the longest one of that period being the Hong Gou (Canal of the Wild Geese), which according to the ancient historian Sima Qian connected the old states of Song, Zhang, Chen, Cai, Cao, and Wei. The Caoyun System of canals was essential for imperial taxation, which was largely assessed in kind and involved enormous shipments of rice and other grains. By far the longest canal was the Grand Canal of China, still the longest canal in the world today and the oldest extant one. It is 1,794 kilometres (1,115 mi) long and was built to carry the Emperor Yang Guang between Zhuodu (Beijing) and Yuhang (Hangzhou). The project began in 605 and was completed in 609, although much of the work combined older canals, the oldest section of the canal existing since at least 486 BC. Even in its narrowest urban sections it is rarely less than 30 metres (98 ft) wide.

In the 5th century BC, Achaemenid king Xerxes I of Persia ordered the construction of the Xerxes Canal through the base of Mount Athos peninsula, Chalkidiki, northern Greece. It was constructed as part of his preparations for the Second Persian invasion of Greece, a part of the Greco-Persian Wars. It is one of the few monuments left by the Persian Empire in Europe.

Greek engineers were also among the first to use canal locks, by which they regulated the water flow in the Ancient Suez Canal as early as the 3rd century BC.

There was little experience moving bulk loads by carts, while a pack-horse would [i.e. 'could'] carry only an eighth of a ton. On a soft road a horse might be able to draw 5/8ths of a ton. But if the load were carried by a barge on a waterway, then up to 30 tons could be drawn by the same horse.
— technology historian Ronald W. Clark referring to transport realities before the industrial revolution and the Canal age.

Hohokam was a society in the North American Southwest in what is now part of Arizona, United States, and Sonora, Mexico. Their irrigation systems supported the largest population in the Southwest by 1300 AD. Archaeologists working at a major archaeological dig in the 1990s in the Tucson Basin, along the Santa Cruz River, identified a culture and people that may have been the ancestors of the Hohokam. This prehistoric group occupied southern Arizona as early as 2000 BC, and in the Early Agricultural period grew corn, lived year-round in sedentary villages, and developed sophisticated irrigation canals. The large-scale Hohokam irrigation network in the Phoenix metropolitan area was the most complex in ancient North America. A portion of the ancient canals has been renovated for the Salt River Project and now helps to supply the city's water.

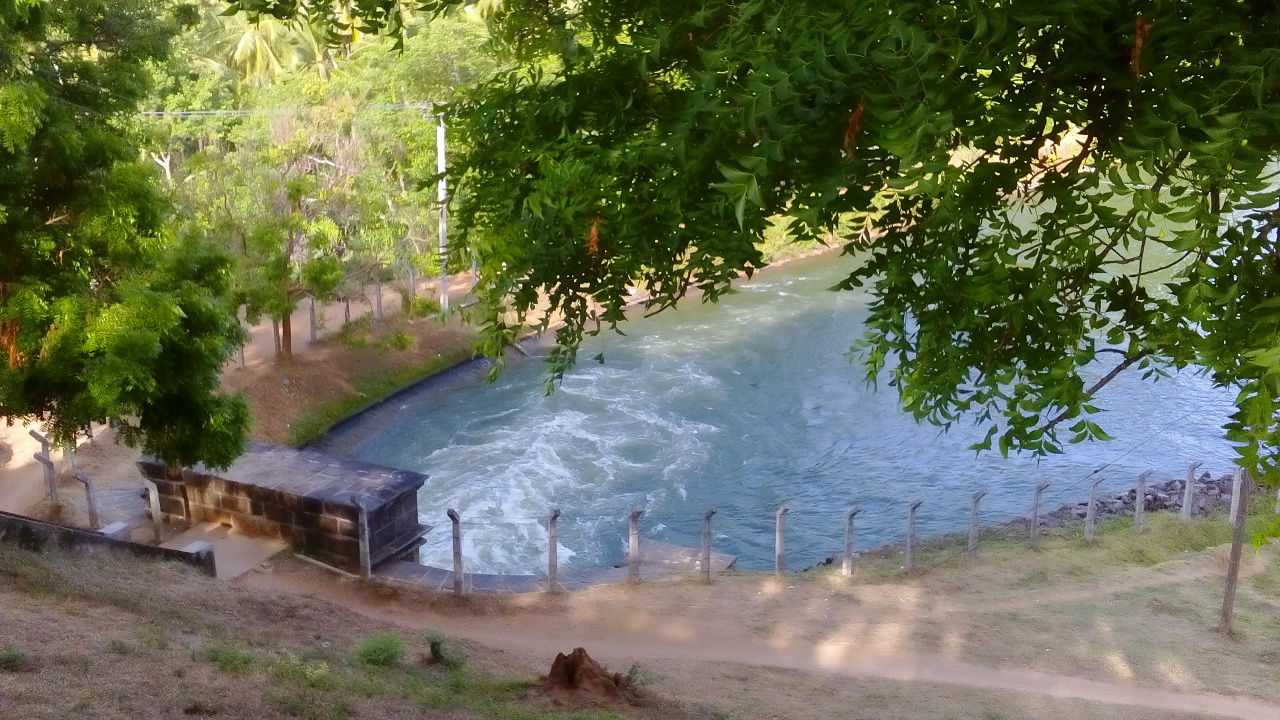
Yodha Ela, Anuradhapura, Sri Lanka

The Sinhalese constructed the 87 km (54 mi) Yodha Ela in 459 AD as a part of their extensive irrigation network which functioned in a way of a moving reservoir due to its single banking aspect to manage the canal pressure with the influx of water. It was also designed as an elongated reservoir passing through traps creating 66 mini catchments as it flows from Kala Wewa to Thissa Wawa. The canal was not designed for the quick conveying of water from Kala Wewa to Thissa Wawa but to create a mass of water between the two reservoirs, which would in turn provide for agriculture and the use of humans and animals. They also achieved a rather low gradient for its time. The canal is still in use after renovation.

=== Middle Ages ===
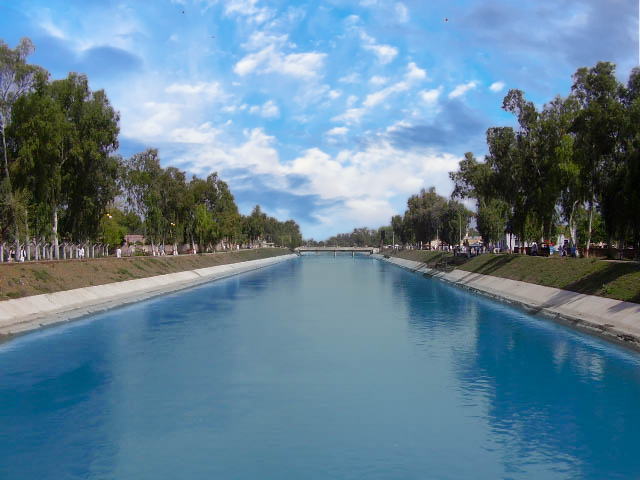
Thal Canal, Punjab, Pakistan

In the Middle Ages, water transport was several times cheaper and faster than transport overland. Overland transport by animal drawn conveyances was used around settled areas, but unimproved roads required pack animal trains, usually of mules to carry any degree of mass, and while a mule could carry an eighth ton, it also needed teamsters to tend it and one man could only tend perhaps five mules, meaning overland bulk transport was also expensive, as men expect compensation in the form of wages, room and board. This was because long-haul roads were unpaved, more often than not too narrow for carts, much less wagons, and in poor condition, wending their way through forests, marshy or muddy quagmires as often as unimproved but dry footing. In that era, as today, greater cargoes, especially bulk goods and raw materials, could be transported by ship far more economically than by land; in the pre-railroad days of the industrial revolution, water transport was the gold standard of fast transportation. The first artificial canal in Western Europe was the Fossa Carolina built at the end of the 8th century under personal supervision of Charlemagne.

In Britain, the Glastonbury Canal is believed to be the first post-Roman canal and was built in the middle of the 10th century to link the River Brue at Northover with Glastonbury Abbey, a distance of about 1.75 kilometres (1,900 yd). Its initial purpose is believed to be the transport of building stone for the abbey, but later it was used for delivering produce, including grain, wine and fish, from the abbey's outlying properties. It remained in use until at least the 14th century, but possibly as late as the mid-16th century.

More lasting and of more economic impact were canals like the Naviglio Grande built between 1127 and 1257 to connect Milan with the river Ticino. The Naviglio Grande is the most important of the lombard "navigli" and the oldest functioning canal in Europe.

Later, canals were built in the Netherlands and Flanders to drain the polders and assist transportation of goods and people.

Canal building was revived in this age because of commercial expansion from the 12th century. River navigations were improved progressively by the use of single, or flash locks. Taking boats through these used large amounts of water leading to conflicts with watermill owners and to correct this, the pound or chamber lock first appeared, in the 10th century in China and in Europe in 1373 in Vreeswijk, Netherlands. Another important development was the mitre gate, which was, it is presumed, introduced in Italy by Bertola da Novate in the 16th century. This allowed wider gates and also removed the height restriction of guillotine locks.

To break out of the limitations caused by river valleys, the first summit level canals were developed with the Grand Canal of China in 581–617 AD whilst in Europe the first, also using single locks, was the Stecknitz Canal in Germany in 1398.

==== Africa ====
In the Songhai Empire of West Africa, several canals were constructed under Sunni Ali and Askia Muhammad I between Kabara and Timbuktu in the 15th century. These were used primarily for irrigation and transport. Sunni Ali also attempted to construct a canal from the Niger River to Walata to facilitate conquest of the city but his progress was halted when he went to war with the Mossi Kingdoms.

=== Early modern period ===
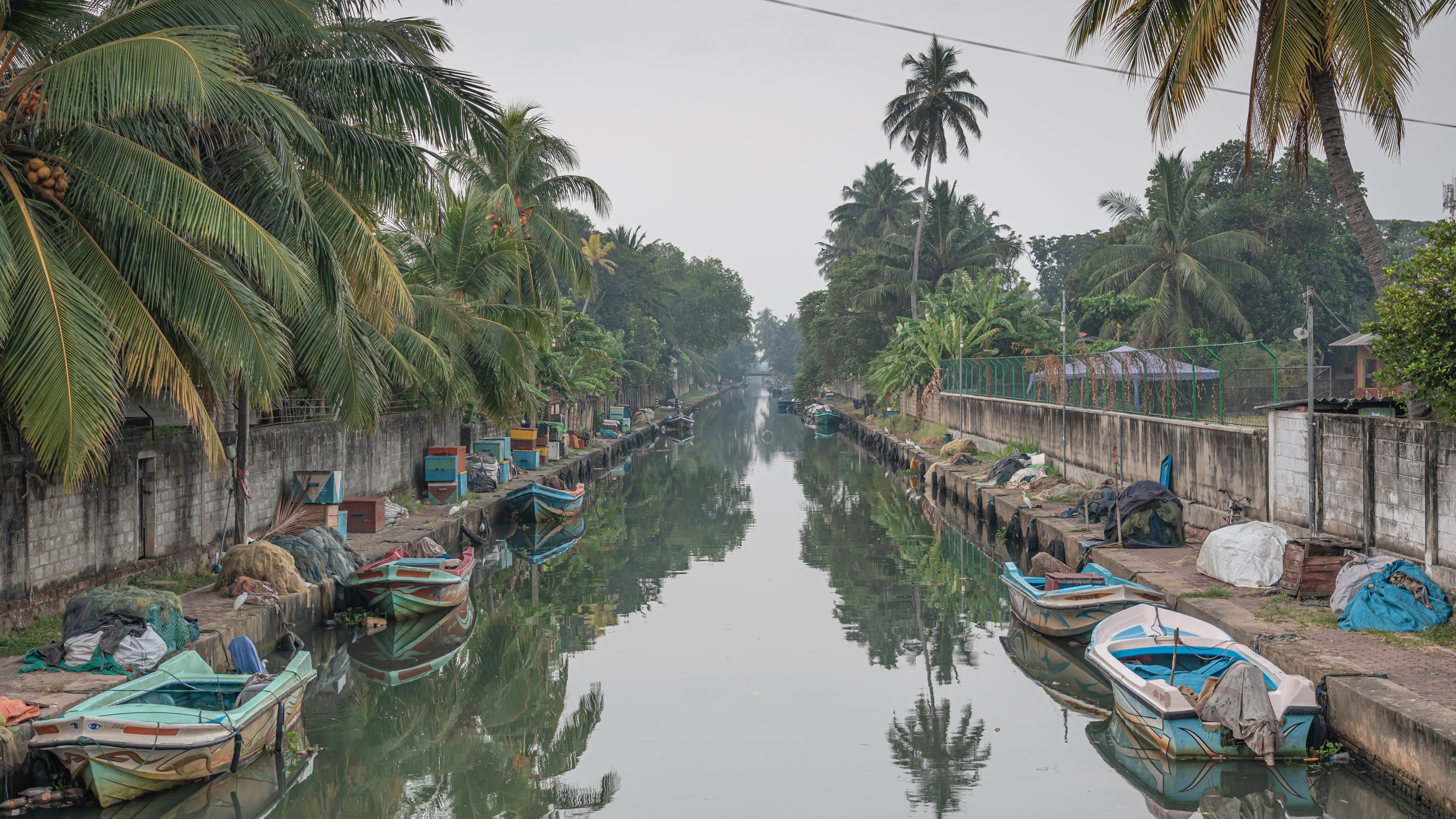
Dutch canal in Negombo, Sri Lanka

Around 1500–1800 the first summit level canal to use pound locks in Europe was the Briare Canal connecting the Loire and Seine (1642), followed by the more ambitious Canal du Midi (1683) connecting the Atlantic to the Mediterranean. This included a staircase of 8 locks at Béziers, a 157-metre (515 ft) tunnel, and three major aqueducts.

Canal building progressed steadily in Germany in the 17th and 18th centuries with three great rivers, the Elbe, Oder and Weser being linked by canals. In post-Roman Britain, the first early modern period canal built appears to have been the Exeter Canal, which was surveyed in 1563, and open in 1566.

The oldest canal in the European settlements of North America, technically a mill race built for industrial purposes, is Mother Brook between the Boston, Massachusetts neighbourhoods of Dedham and Hyde Park connecting the higher waters of the Charles River and the mouth of the Neponset River and the sea. It was constructed in 1639 to provide water power for mills.

In Russia, the Volga–Baltic Waterway, a nationwide canal system connecting the Baltic Sea and Caspian Sea via the Neva and Volga rivers, was opened in 1718.

=== Industrial Revolution ===
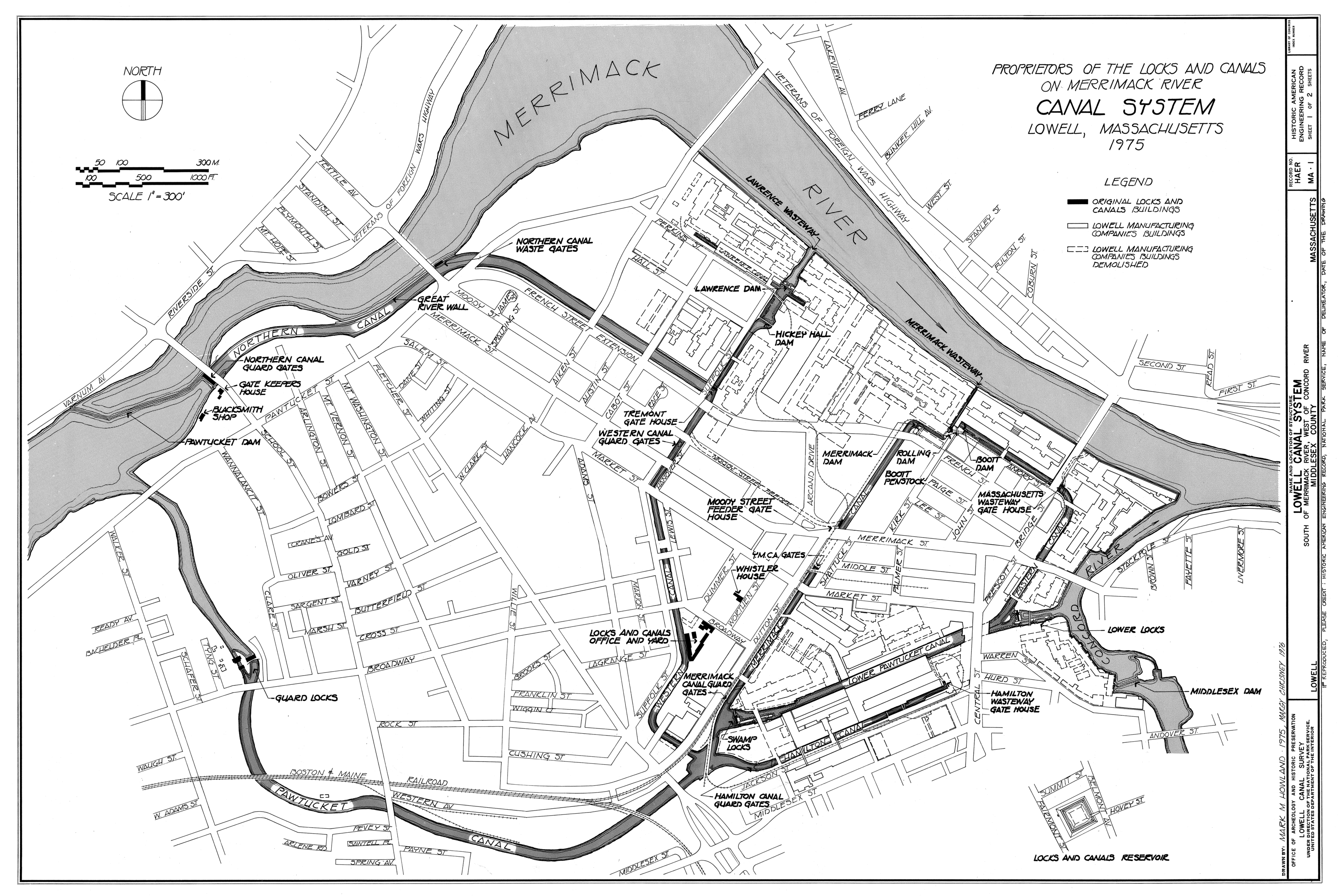
Lowell's power canal system

The modern canal system was mainly a product of the 18th century and early 19th century. It came into being because the Industrial Revolution (which began in Britain during the mid-18th century) demanded an economic and reliable way to transport goods and commodities in large quantities.

By the early 18th century, river navigations such as the Aire and Calder Navigation were becoming quite sophisticated, with pound locks and longer and longer "cuts" (some with intermediate locks) to avoid circuitous or difficult stretches of river. Eventually, the experience of building long multi-level cuts with their own locks gave rise to the idea of building a "pure" canal, a waterway designed on the basis of where goods needed to go, not where a river happened to be.

The claim for the first pure canal in Great Britain is debated between "Sankey" and "Bridgewater" supporters. The first true canal in what is now the United Kingdom was the Newry Canal in Northern Ireland constructed by Thomas Steers in 1741.

The Sankey Brook Navigation, which connected St Helens with the River Mersey, is often claimed as the first modern "purely artificial" canal because although originally a scheme to make the Sankey Brook navigable, it included an entirely new artificial channel that was effectively a canal along the Sankey Brook valley. However, "Bridgewater" supporters point out that the last quarter-mile of the navigation is indeed a canalized stretch of the Brook, and that it was the Bridgewater Canal (less obviously associated with an existing river) that captured the popular imagination and inspired further canals.

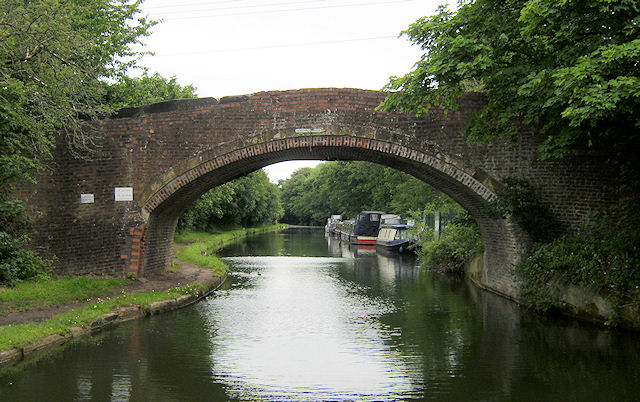
Bridgewater Canal in England

In the mid-eighteenth century the 3rd Duke of Bridgewater, who owned a number of coal mines in northern England, wanted a reliable way to transport his coal to the rapidly industrializing city of Manchester. He commissioned the engineer James Brindley to build a canal for that purpose. Brindley's design included an aqueduct carrying the canal over the River Irwell. This was an engineering wonder which immediately attracted tourists. The construction of this canal was funded entirely by the Duke and was called the Bridgewater Canal. It opened in 1761 and was the first major British canal.

The new canals proved highly successful. The boats on the canal were horse-drawn with a towpath alongside the canal for the horse to walk along. This horse-drawn system proved to be highly economical and became standard across the British canal network. Commercial horse-drawn canal boats could be seen on the UK's canals until as late as the 1950s, although by then diesel-powered boats, often towing a second unpowered boat, had become standard.

The canal boats could carry thirty tons at a time with only one horse pulling – more than ten times the amount of cargo per horse that was possible with a cart. Because of this huge increase in supply, the Bridgewater canal reduced the price of coal in Manchester by nearly two-thirds within just a year of its opening. The Bridgewater was also a huge financial success, with it earning what had been spent on its construction within just a few years.

This success proved the viability of canal transport, and soon industrialists in many other parts of the country wanted canals. After the Bridgewater canal, early canals were built by groups of private individuals with an interest in improving communications. In Staffordshire the famous potter Josiah Wedgwood saw an opportunity to bring bulky cargoes of clay to his factory doors and to transport his fragile finished goods to market in Manchester, Birmingham or further away, by water, minimizing breakages. Within just a few years of the Bridgewater's opening, an embryonic national canal network came into being, with the construction of canals such as the Oxford Canal and the Trent and Mersey Canal.

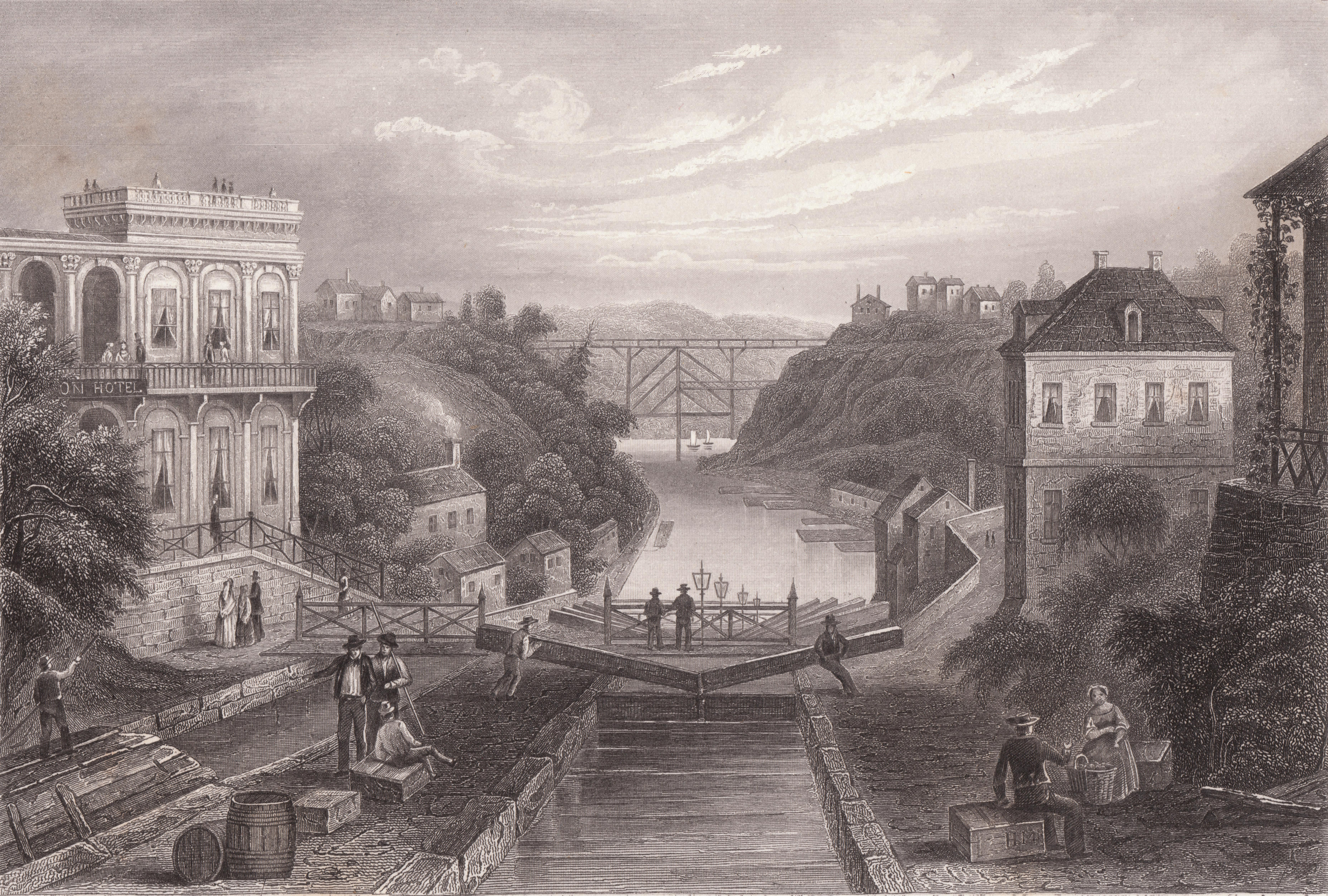
Erie Canal, Lockport, New York, c. 1855

The new canal system was both cause and effect of the rapid industrialization of The Midlands and the north. The period between the 1770s and the 1830s is often referred to as the "Golden Age" of British canals.

For each canal, an act of Parliament was necessary to authorize construction, and as people saw the high incomes achieved from canal tolls, canal proposals came to be put forward by investors interested in profiting from dividends, at least as much as by people whose businesses would profit from cheaper transport of raw materials and finished goods.

In a further development, there was often out-and-out speculation, where people would try to buy shares in a newly floated company to sell them on for an immediate profit, regardless of whether the canal was ever profitable, or even built. During this period of "canal mania", huge sums were invested in canal building, and although many schemes came to nothing, the canal system rapidly expanded to nearly 6,400 kilometres (4,000 mi) in length.

Many rival canal companies were formed and competition was rampant. Perhaps the best example was Worcester Bar in Birmingham, a point where the Worcester and Birmingham Canal and the Birmingham Canal Navigations Main Line were only seven feet apart. For many years, a dispute about tolls meant that goods travelling through Birmingham had to be portaged from boats in one canal to boats in the other.

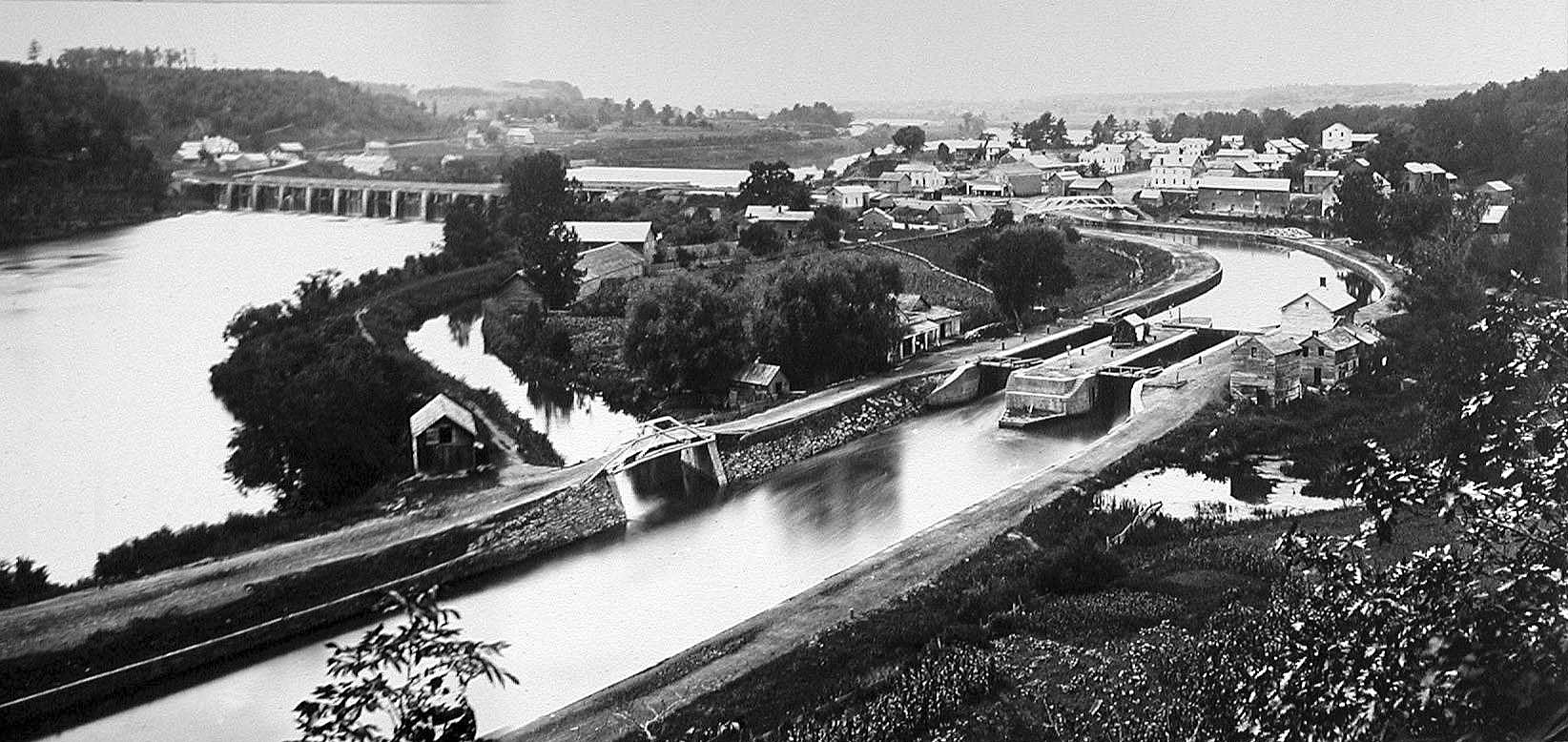
Aqueduct over the Mohawk River at Rexford, New York, one of 32 navigable aqueducts on the Erie Canal

Canal companies were initially chartered by individual states in the United States. These early canals were constructed, owned, and operated by private joint-stock companies. Four were completed when the War of 1812 broke out; these were the South Hadley Canal (opened 1795) in Massachusetts, Santee Canal (opened 1800) in South Carolina, the Middlesex Canal (opened 1802) also in Massachusetts, and the Dismal Swamp Canal (opened 1805) in Virginia. The Erie Canal (opened 1825) was chartered and owned by the state of New York and financed by bonds bought by private investors. The Erie canal runs about 584 kilometres (363 mi) from Albany, New York, on the Hudson River to Buffalo, New York, at Lake Erie. The Hudson River connects Albany to the Atlantic port of New York City and the Erie Canal completed a navigable water route from the Atlantic Ocean to the Great Lakes. The canal contains 36 locks and encompasses a total elevation differential of around 172 m (565 ft). The Erie Canal with its easy connections to most of the US mid-west and New York City soon quickly paid back all its invested capital (US$7 million) and started turning a profit. By cutting transportation costs in half or more it became a large profit center for Albany and New York City as it allowed the cheap transportation of many of the agricultural products grown in the mid west of the United States to the rest of the world. From New York City these agricultural products could easily be shipped to other US states or overseas. Assured of a market for their farm products the settlement of the US mid-west was greatly accelerated by the Erie Canal. The profits generated by the Erie Canal project started a canal building boom in the United States that lasted until about 1850 when railroads started becoming seriously competitive in price and convenience. The Blackstone Canal (finished in 1828) in Massachusetts and Rhode Island fulfilled a similar role in the early industrial revolution between 1828 and 1848. The Blackstone Valley was a major contributor of the American Industrial Revolution where Samuel Slater built his first textile mill.

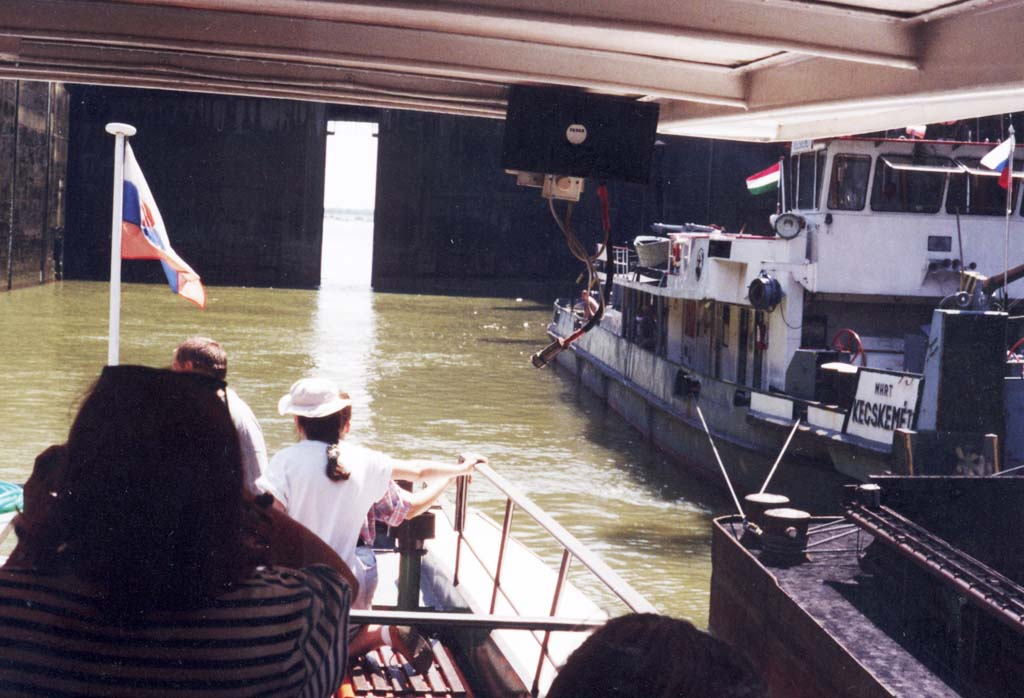
Sluice in the canal of Gabčíkovo Dam (Slovakia) – the canal is conveying water to a hydroelectric power station.

=== Power canals ===
A power canal refers to a canal used for hydraulic power generation, rather than for transport. Nowadays power canals are built almost exclusively as parts of hydroelectric power stations. Parts of the United States, particularly in the Northeast, had enough fast-flowing rivers that water power was the primary means of powering factories (usually textile mills) until after the American Civil War. For example, Lowell, Massachusetts, considered to be "The Cradle of the American Industrial Revolution," has 10 kilometres (6 mi) of canals, built from around 1790 to 1850, that provided water power and a means of transportation for the city. The output of the system is estimated at 7,500 kilowatts (10,000 hp). Other cities with extensive power canal systems include Lawrence, Massachusetts, Holyoke, Massachusetts, Manchester, New Hampshire, and Augusta, Georgia. The most notable power canal was built in 1862 for the Niagara Falls Hydraulic Power and Manufacturing Company.

=== 19th century ===
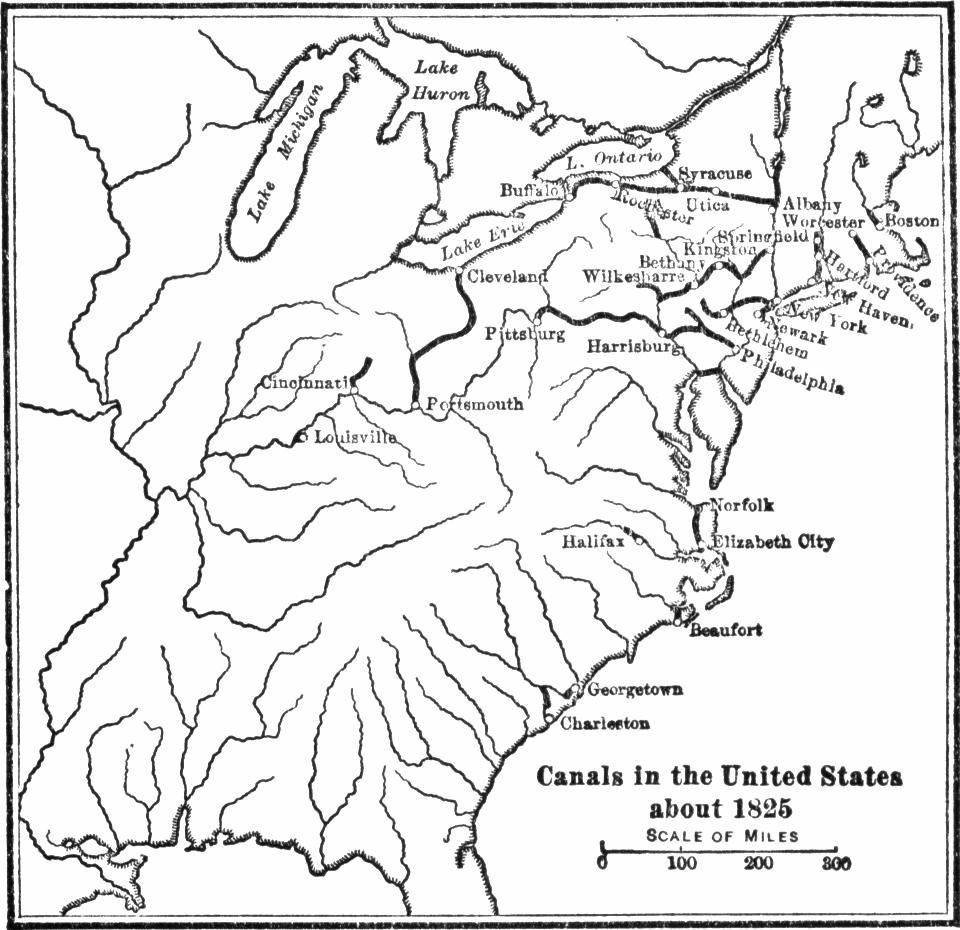
American canals c. 1825

Competition, from railways from the 1830s and roads in the 20th century, made the smaller canals obsolete for most commercial transport, and many of the British canals fell into decay. Only the Manchester Ship Canal and the Aire and Calder Canal bucked this trend. Yet in other countries canals grew in size as construction techniques improved. During the 19th century in the US, the length of canals grew from 160 kilometres (100 mi) to over 6,400 kilometres (4,000 mi), with a complex network making the Great Lakes navigable, in conjunction with Canada, although some canals were later drained and used as railroad rights-of-way.

In the United States, navigable canals reached into isolated areas and brought them in touch with the world beyond. By 1825 the Erie Canal, 584 kilometres (363 mi) long with 36 locks, opened up a connection from the populated Northeast to the Great Lakes. Settlers flooded into regions serviced by such canals, since access to markets was available. The Erie Canal (as well as other canals) was instrumental in lowering the differences in commodity prices between these various markets across America. The canals caused price convergence between different regions because of their reduction in transportation costs, which allowed Americans to ship and buy goods from farther distances much cheaper. Ohio built many miles of canal, Indiana had working canals for a few decades, and the Illinois and Michigan Canal connected the Great Lakes to the Mississippi River system until replaced by a channelized river waterway.

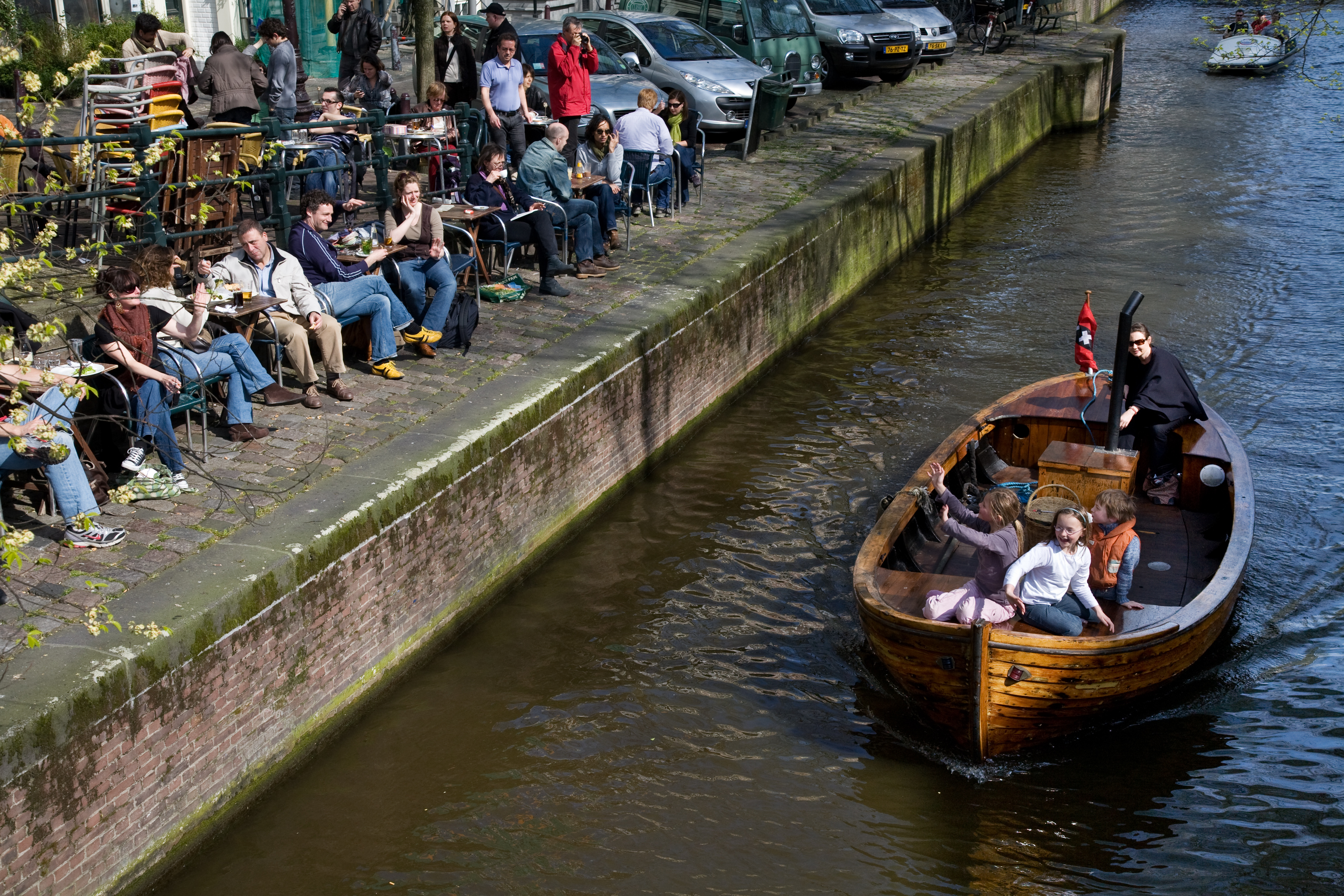
A family rides a boat in one of the canals of Amsterdam.

Three major canals with very different purposes were built in what is now Canada. The first Welland Canal, which opened in 1829 between Lake Ontario and Lake Erie, bypassing Niagara Falls and the Lachine Canal (1825), which allowed ships to skirt the nearly impassable rapids on the St. Lawrence River at Montreal, were built for commerce. The Rideau Canal, completed in 1832, connects Ottawa on the Ottawa River to Kingston, Ontario on Lake Ontario. The Rideau Canal was built as a result of the War of 1812 to provide military transportation between the British colonies of Upper Canada and Lower Canada as an alternative to part of the St. Lawrence River, which was susceptible to blockade by the United States.

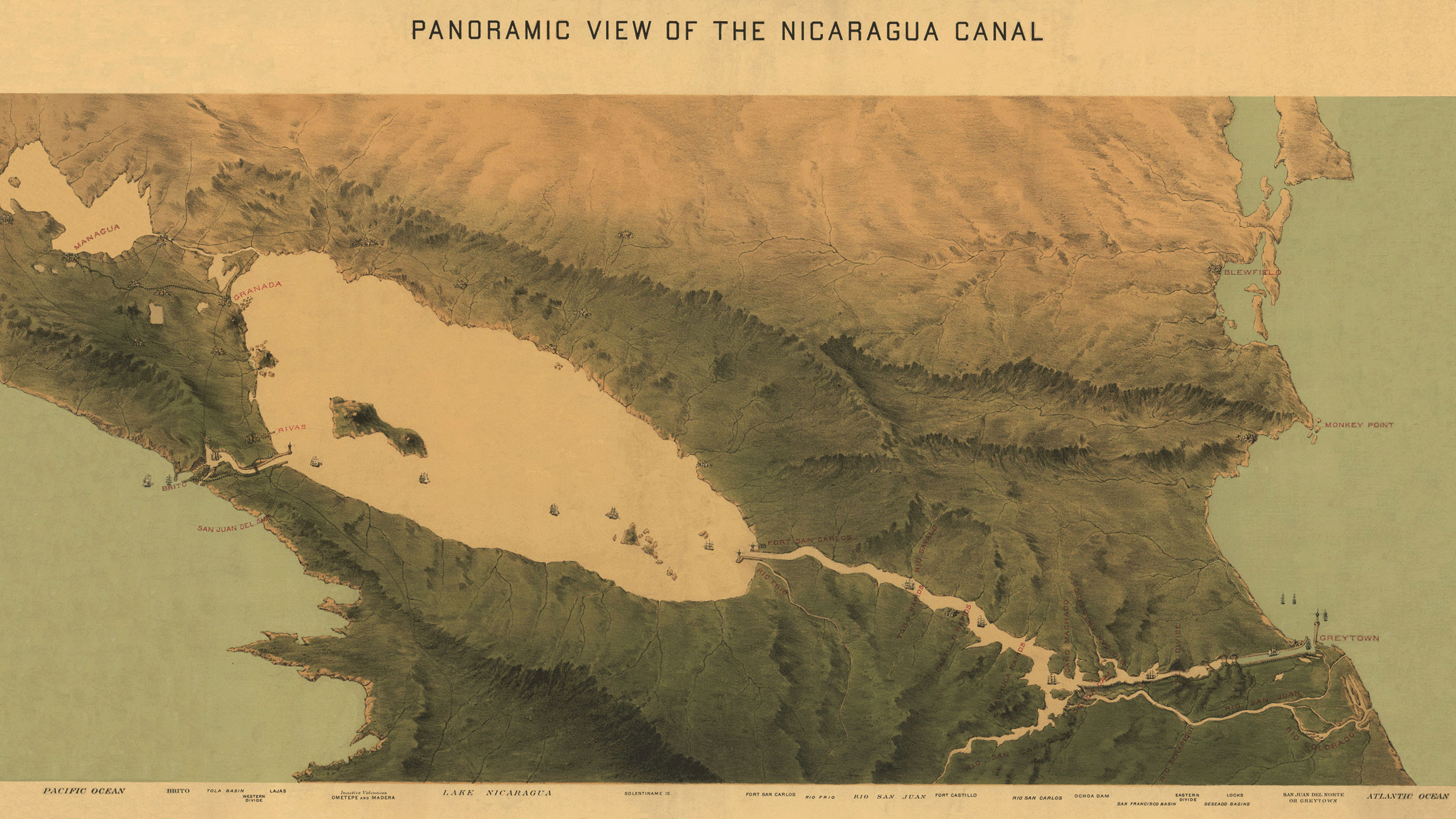
A proposal for the Nicaragua Canal, from around 1870.

In France, a steady linking of all the river systems – Rhine, Rhône, Saône and Seine – and the North Sea was boosted in 1879 by the establishment of the Freycinet gauge, which specified the minimum size of locks. Canal traffic doubled in the first decades of the 20th century.

Many notable sea canals were completed in this period, starting with the Suez Canal (1869) – which carries tonnage many times that of most other canals – and the Kiel Canal (1897), though the Panama Canal was not opened until 1914.

In the 19th century, a number of canals were built in Japan including the Biwako canal and the Tone canal. These canals were partially built with the help of engineers from the Netherlands and other countries.

A major question was how to connect the Atlantic and the Pacific with a canal through narrow Central America. (The Panama Railroad opened in 1855.) The original proposal was for a sea-level canal through what is today Nicaragua, taking advantage of the relatively large Lake Nicaragua. This canal has never been built in part because of political instability, which scared off potential investors. It remains an active project (the geography has not changed), and in the 2010s Chinese involvement was developing.

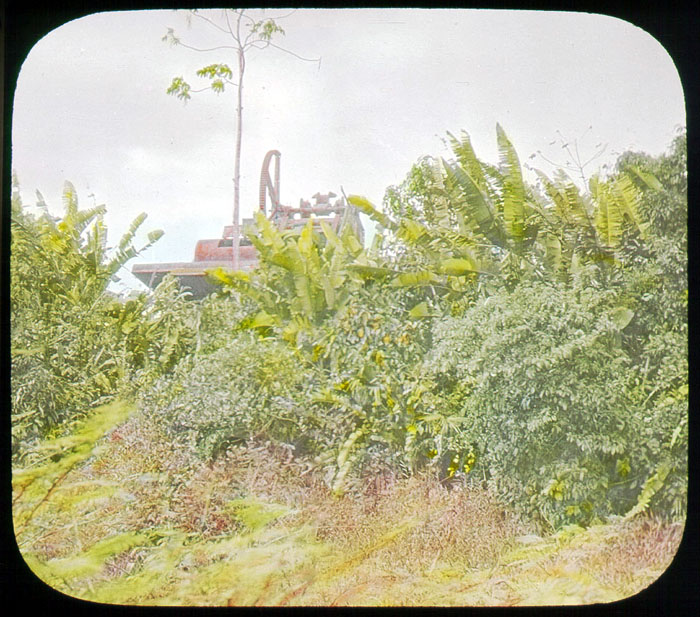
Abandoned DeLesseps equipment, Panama jungle

The second choice for a Central American canal was a Panama Canal. The De Lesseps company, which ran the Suez Canal, first attempted to build a Panama Canal in the 1880s. The difficulty of the terrain and weather (rain) encountered caused the company to go bankrupt. High worker mortality from disease also discouraged further investment in the project. DeLesseps' abandoned excavating equipment sits, isolated decaying machines, today tourist attractions.

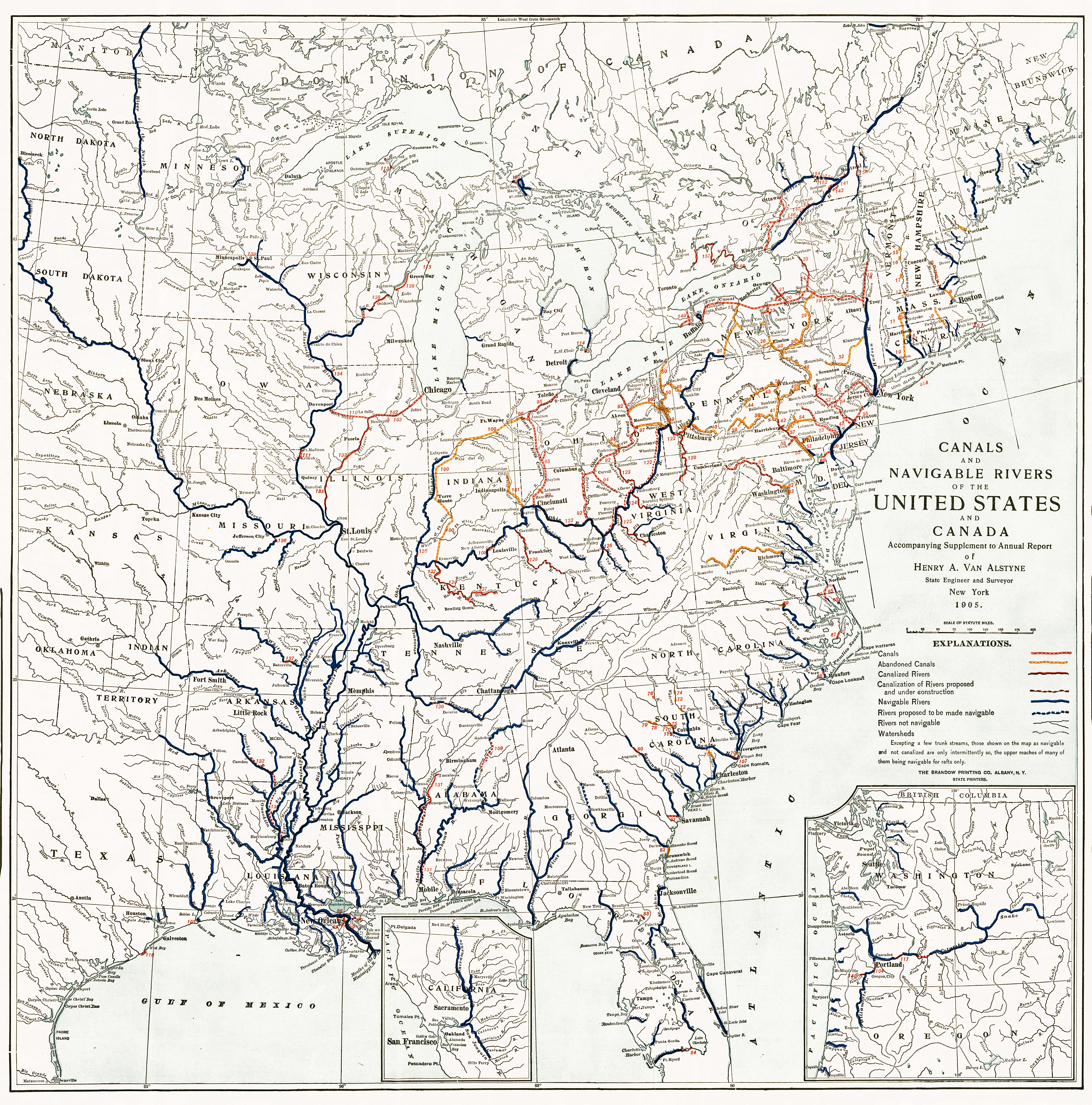
Map of canals and navigable rivers of the east coast of North America, as of 1905

Twenty years later, an expansionist United States, that just acquired colonies after defeating Spain in the 1898 Spanish–American War, and whose Navy became more important, decided to reactivate the project. The United States and Colombia did not reach agreement on the terms of a canal treaty (see Hay–Herrán Treaty). Panama, which did not have (and still does not have) a land connection with the rest of Colombia, was already thinking of independence. In 1903 the United States, with support from Panamanians who expected the canal to provide substantial wages, revenues, and markets for local goods and services, took Panama province away from Colombia, and set up a puppet republic (Panama). Its currency, the Balboa – a name that suggests the country began as a way to get from one hemisphere to the other – was a replica of the US dollar. The US dollar was and remains legal tender (used as currency). A US military zone, the Canal Zone, 16 kilometres (10 mi) wide, with US military stationed there (bases, 2 TV stations, channels 8 and 10, Pxs, a US-style high school), split Panama in half. The Canal – a major engineering project – was built. The US did not feel that conditions were stable enough to withdraw until 1979. The withdrawal from Panama contributed to President Jimmy Carter's defeat in 1980.

=== Modern uses ===
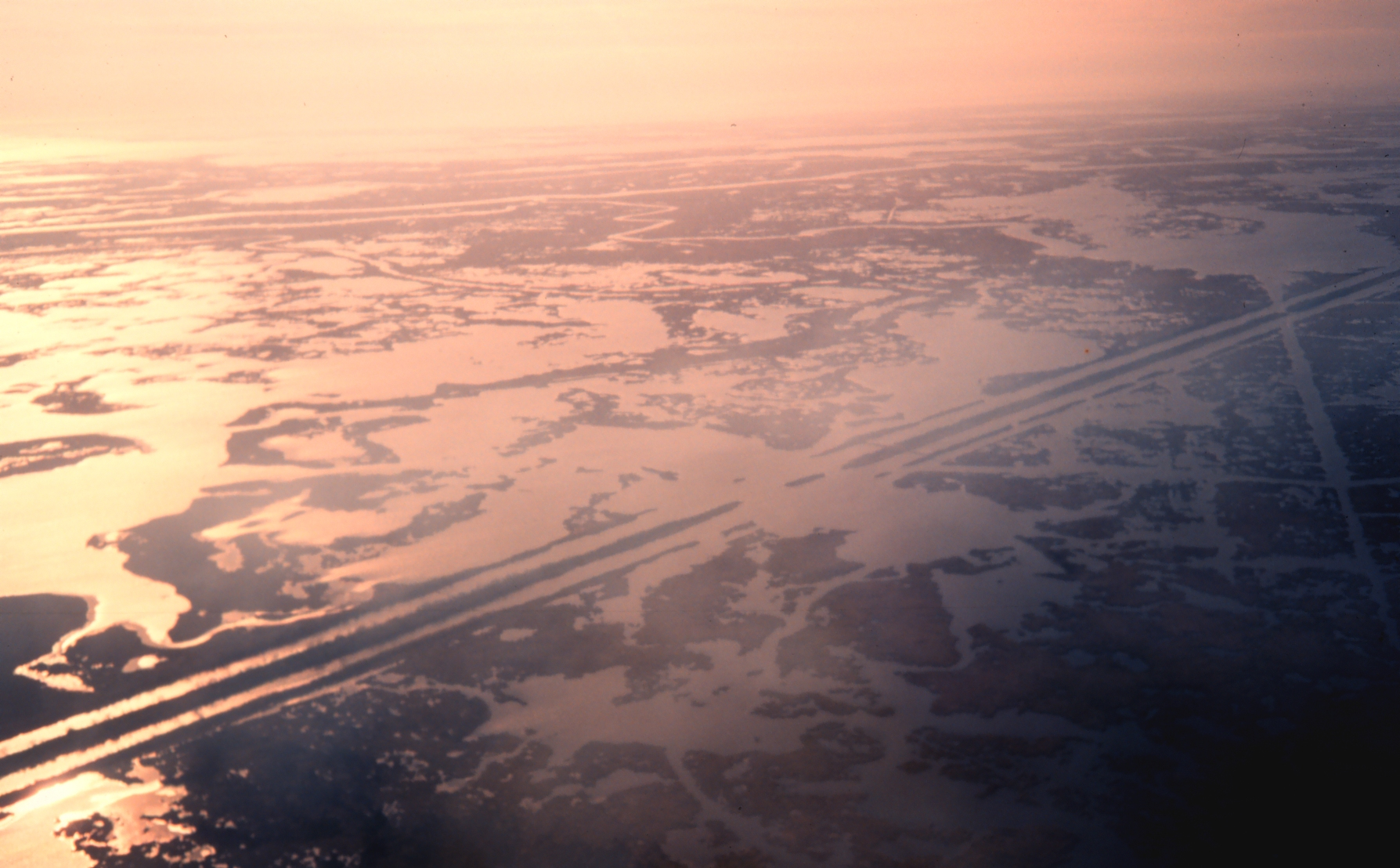
Canals can disrupt water circulation in marsh systems.

Large-scale ship canals such as the Panama Canal and Suez Canal continue to operate for cargo transportation, as do European barge canals. Due to globalization, they are becoming increasingly important, resulting in expansion projects such as the Panama Canal expansion project. The expanded canal began commercial operation on 26 June 2016. The new set of locks allow transit of larger, Post-Panamax and New Panamax ships.

The narrow early industrial canals, however, have ceased to carry significant amounts of trade and many have been abandoned to navigation, but may still be used as a system for transportation of untreated water. In some cases railways have been built along the canal route, an example being the Croydon Canal.

A movement that began in Britain and France to use the early industrial canals for pleasure boats, such as hotel barges, has spurred rehabilitation of stretches of historic canals. In some cases, abandoned canals such as the Kennet and Avon Canal have been restored and are now used by pleasure boaters. In Britain, canalside housing has also proven popular in recent years.

The Seine–Nord Europe Canal is being developed into a major transportation waterway, linking France with Belgium, Germany, and the Netherlands.

Canals have found another use in the 21st century, as easements for the installation of fibre optic telecommunications network cabling, avoiding having them buried in roadways while facilitating access and reducing the hazard of being damaged from digging equipment.

Canals are still used to provide water for agriculture. An extensive canal system exists within the Imperial Valley in the Southern California desert to provide irrigation to agriculture within the area.

== Cities on water ==
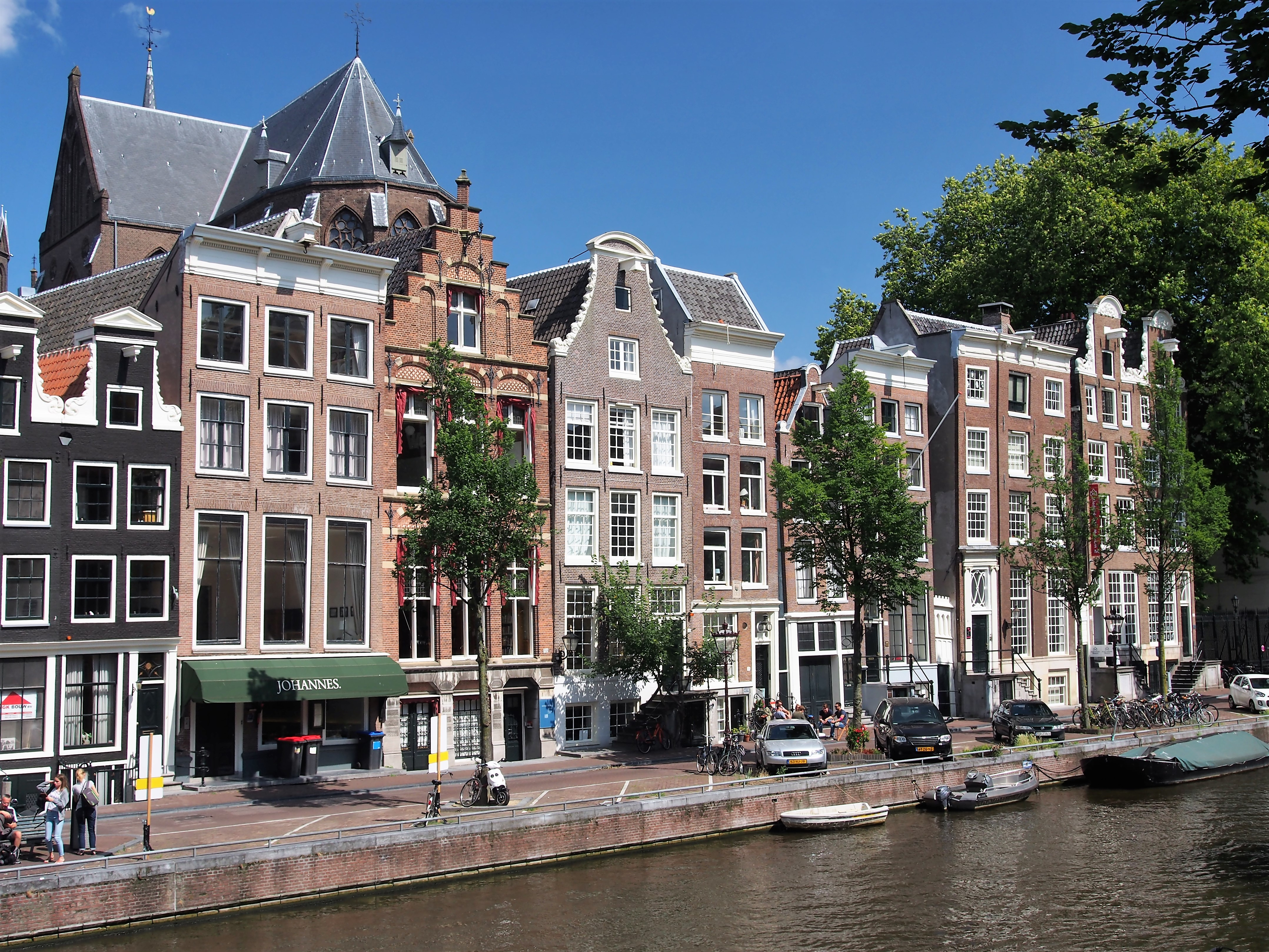
A canal (Gracht) in Amsterdam, Netherlands

Griboyedov Canal in St. Petersburg, Russia

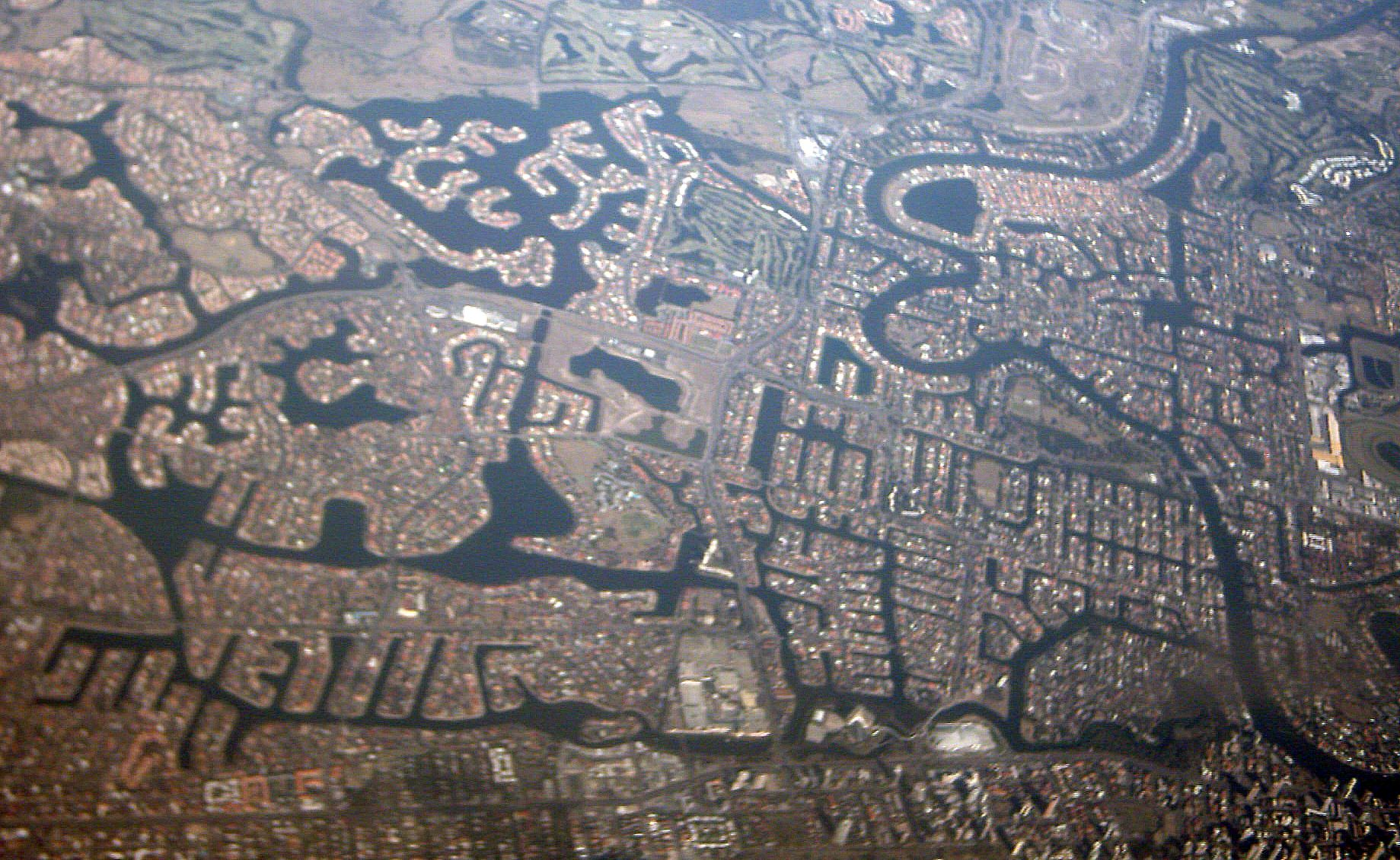
Aerial view of the man-made canals of the Gold Coast, Queensland, Australia

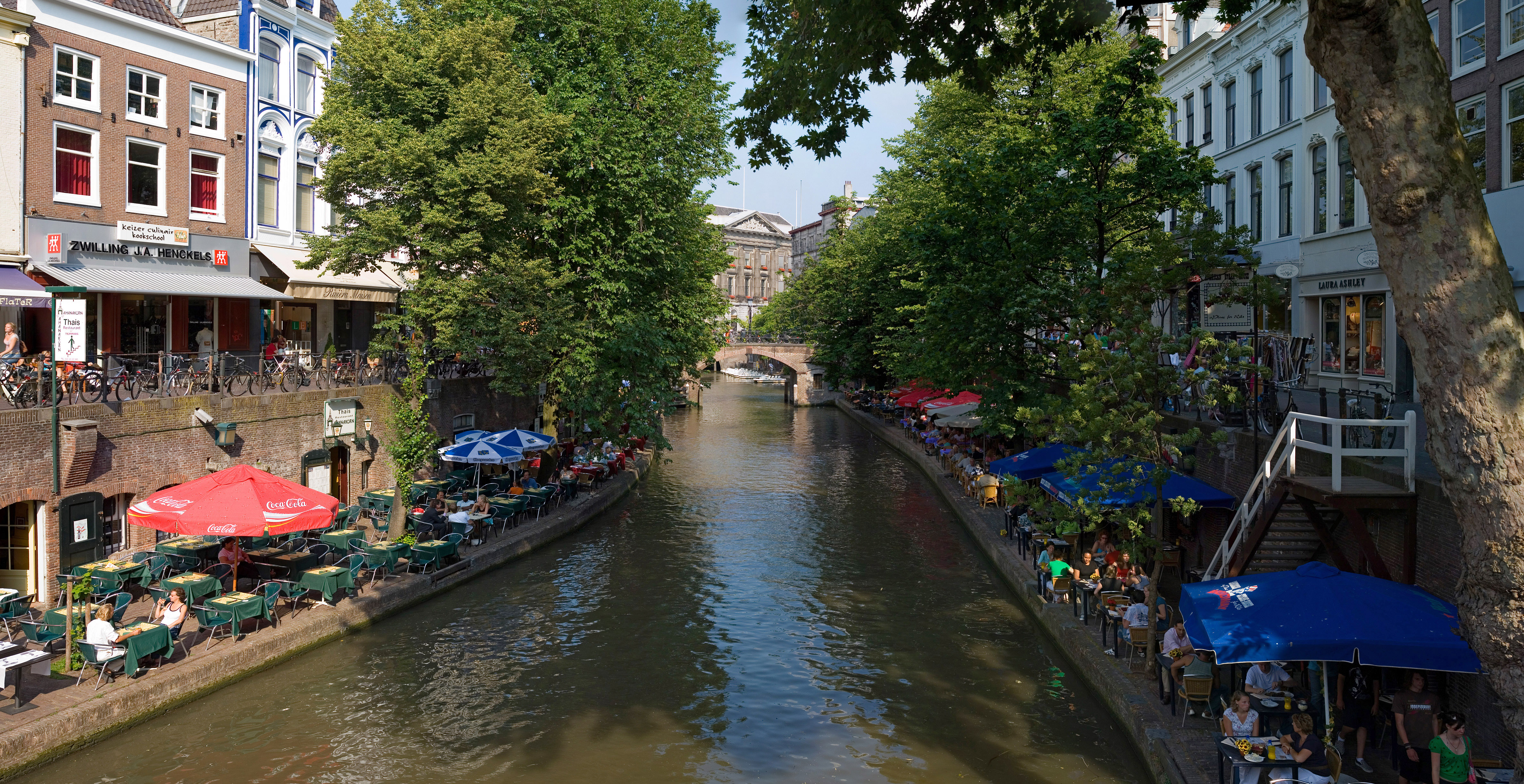
Wharfs along the Oudegracht in Utrecht, Netherlands

Canals are so deeply identified with Venice that many canal cities have been nicknamed "the Venice of…". The city is built on marshy islands, with wooden piles supporting the buildings, so that the land is man-made rather than the waterways. The islands have a long history of settlement; by the 12th century, Venice was a powerful city state.

Amsterdam was built in a similar way, with buildings on wooden piles. It became a city around 1300. Many Amsterdam canals were built as part of fortifications. They became grachten when the city was enlarged and houses were built alongside the water. Its nickname as the "Venice of the North" is shared with Hamburg of Germany, St. Petersburg of Russia and Bruges of Belgium.

Suzhou was dubbed the "Venice of the East" by Marco Polo during his travels there in the 13th century, with its modern canalside Pingjiang Road and Shantang Street becoming major tourist attractions. Other nearby cities including Nanjing, Shanghai, Wuxi, Jiaxing, Huzhou, Nantong, Taizhou, Yangzhou, and Changzhou are located along the lower mouth of the Yangtze River and Lake Tai, yet another source of small rivers and creeks, which have been canalized and developed for centuries.

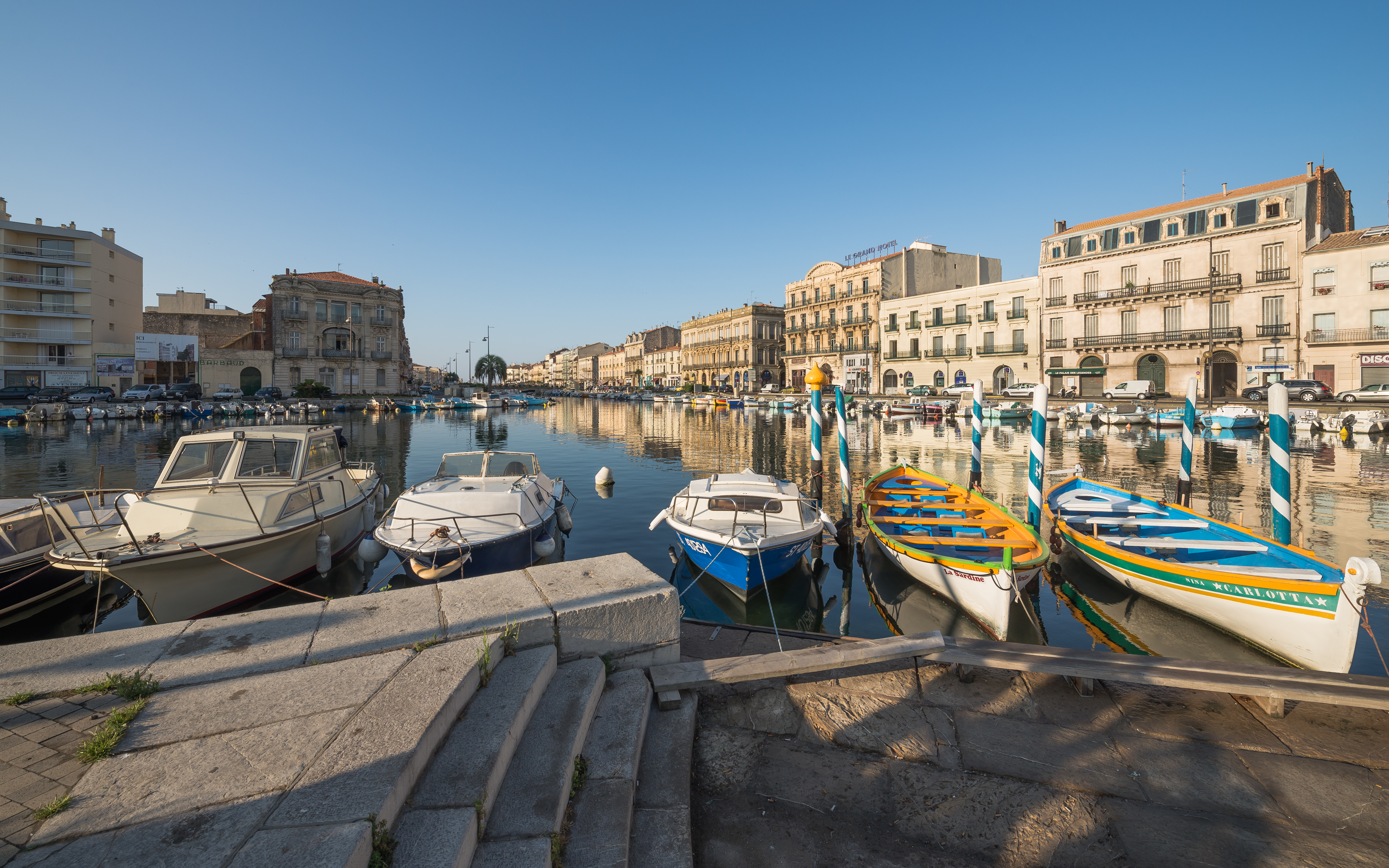
Canal of La Peyrade in Sète, France

Other cities with extensive canal networks include: Alkmaar, Amersfoort, Bolsward, Brielle, Delft, Den Bosch, Dokkum, Dordrecht, Enkhuizen, Franeker, Gouda, Haarlem, Harlingen, Leeuwarden, Leiden, Sneek and Utrecht in the Netherlands; Brugge and Gent in Flanders, Belgium; Birmingham in England; Saint Petersburg in Russia; Bydgoszcz, Gdańsk, Szczecin and Wrocław in Poland; Aveiro in Portugal; Hamburg and Berlin in Germany; Fort Lauderdale and Cape Coral in Florida, United States, Wenzhou in China, Cần Thơ in Vietnam, Bangkok in Thailand, and Lahore in Pakistan.

Liverpool Maritime Mercantile City was a UNESCO World Heritage Site near the centre of Liverpool, England, where a system of intertwining waterways and docks is now being developed for mainly residential and leisure use.

Canal estates (sometimes known as bayous in the United States) are a form of subdivision popular in cities like Miami, Texas City, Texas and the Gold Coast, Queensland; the Gold Coast has over 890 km (550 mi) of residential canals. Wetlands are difficult areas upon which to build housing estates, so dredging part of the wetland down to a navigable channel provides fill to build up another part of the wetland above the flood level for houses. Land is built up in a finger pattern that provides a suburban street layout of waterfront housing blocks.

== Boats ==
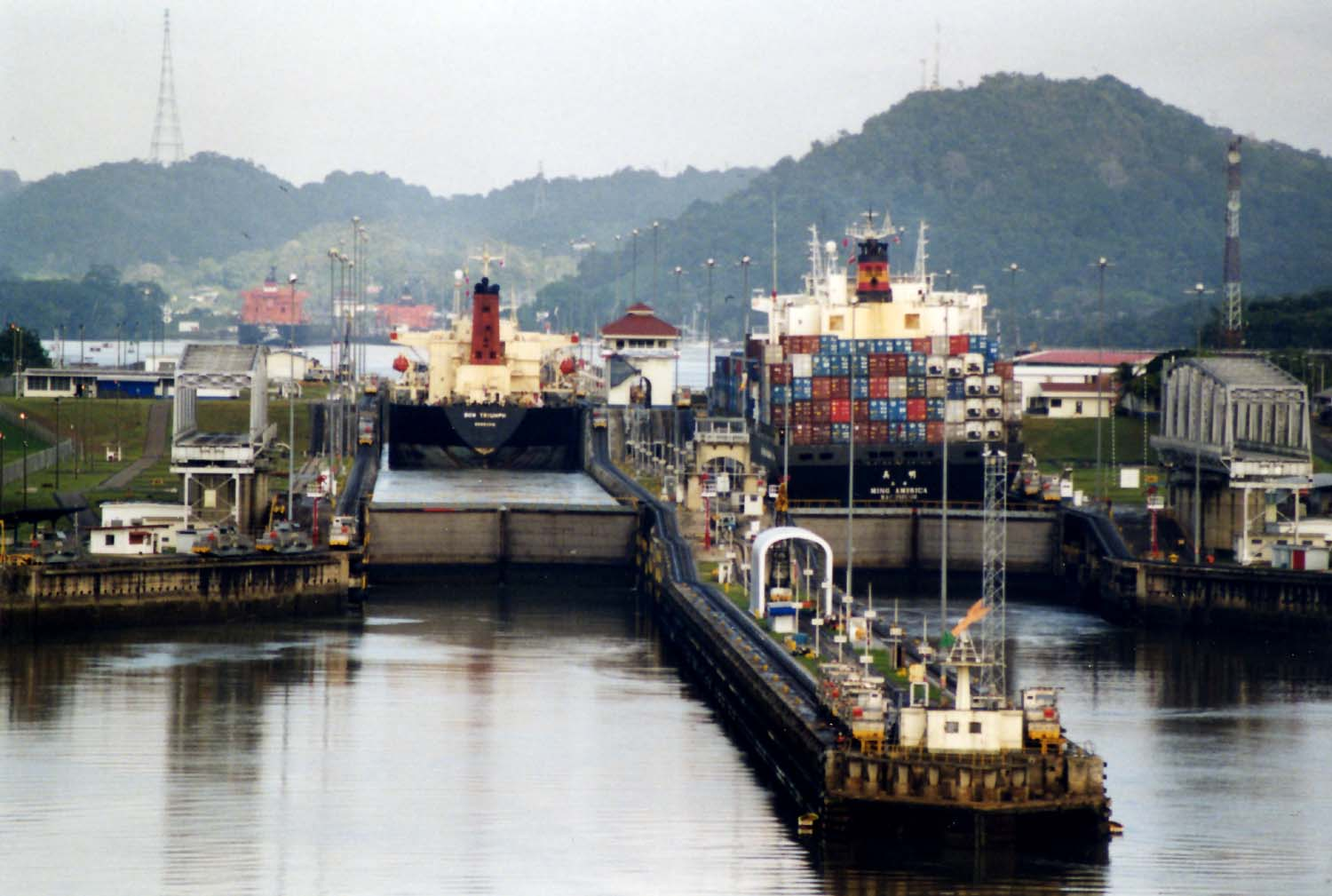
Two Panamax ships in the Miraflores Locks on the Panama Canal, Panama

Inland canals have often had boats specifically built for them. An example of this is the British narrowboat, which is up to 22 metres (72 ft) long and 2.1 metres (7 ft) wide and was primarily built for British Midland canals. In this case the limiting factor was the size of the locks. This is also the limiting factor on the Panama canal where Panamax ships were limited to a length of 289.56 m (950 ft) and a beam of 32.31 m (106 ft) until 26 June 2016 when the opening of larger locks allowed for the passage of larger New Panamax ships. For the lockless Suez Canal the limiting factor for Suezmax ships is generally draft, which is limited to 16 m (52.5 ft). At the other end of the scale, tub-boat canals such as the Bude Canal were limited to boats of under 10 tons for much of their length due to the capacity of their inclined planes or boat lifts. Most canals have a limit on height imposed either by bridges or by tunnels.

== Lists of canals ==
- Africa
  - Bahr Yussef
  - El Salam Canal (Egypt)
  - Ibrahimiya Canal (Egypt)
  - Mahmoudiyah Canal (Egypt)
  - Suez Canal (Egypt)
- Asia
  - see List of canals in India
  - see List of canals in Pakistan
  - see History of canals in China
  - King Abdullah Canal (Jordan)
  - Qanat al-Jaish (Iraq)
- Europe
  - Danube–Black Sea Canal (Romania)
  - North Crimean Canal (Ukraine)
  - Canals of France
  - Canals of Amsterdam
  - Canals of Germany
  - Canals of Ireland
  - Canals of Russia
  - Canals of the United Kingdom
    - List of canals in the United Kingdom
  - Great Bačka Canal (Serbia)
- North America
  - Canals of Canada
  - Canals of the United States
  - Panama Canal

== List of proposed canals ==
- Eurasia Canal
- Istanbul Canal
- Nicaragua Canal
- Salwa Canal
- Thai Canal
- Sulawesi Canal
- Two Seas Canal
- Northern river reversal
- Balkan Canal or Danube–Morava–Vardar–Aegean Canal
- Iranrud

== See also ==
- Beaver
- Calle canal
- Canal & River Trust
- Canal tunnel
- Horse-drawn boat
- Mooring
- Navigation authority
- Roman canals
- Water bridge
- Waterscape
- Waterway restoration
- Weigh lock
