= Saba Abkar =

Area of Baghdad, Iraq

- Interactive map of Saba Abkar

Saba Abkar is an area, north of Baghdad, Iraq, located on the eastern bank of Tigris, just outside of Adhamiya.
