= Qanat al-Jaish =

Waterway in Iraq

Coordinates: 33.28°N 44.5268°E

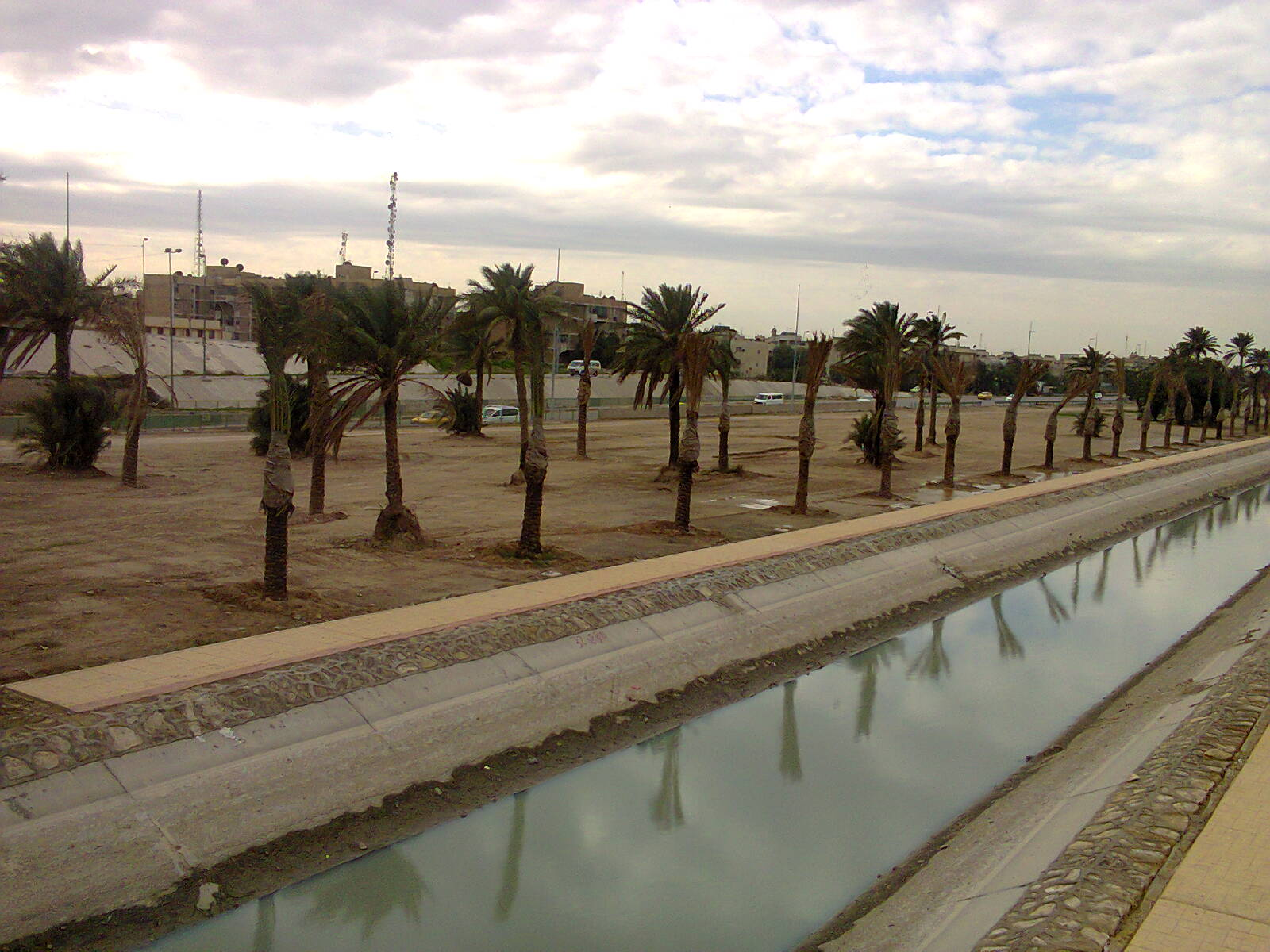
view of Qanat al-Jaish in Baghdad

Army Canal (Qanat al-Jaish in Arabic) is a 25-kilometre (16 mi) waterway connecting the Tigris and Diyala rivers, forms the western boundary of Sadr City, and when completed, will once again supply irrigation water to nearby agricultural areas and clean drinking water to Rusafa, Baghdad. along its course a highway road runs. The Army Canal, which runs a total of 25 kilometers spanning from Adhamiyah (Saba Abkar) in northeastern Baghdad to Rustimiyah in southeastern Baghdad, was built on October 10, 1960, and inaugurated on July 15, 1961, by Abd al-Kareem Qassim, the former president of Iraq. It later became a ribbon of stagnant water because of sludge, low water levels, and lack of maintenance.
