= List of canals in the United Kingdom =

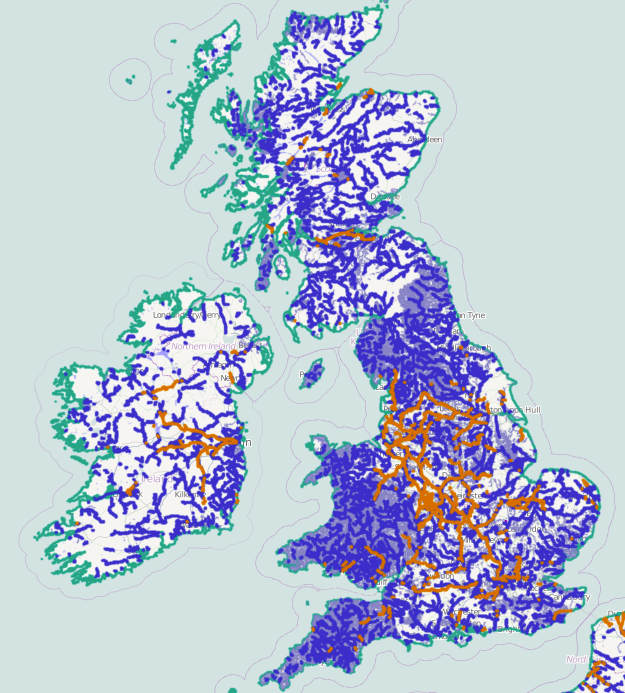
Map showing canals of the British Isles and Ireland. Canals in orange, rivers in blue, streams in grey.

Map of the current, leisure oriented system.

The following list of canals in the United Kingdom, includes some systems that are navigable rivers with sections of canal (e.g. Aire and Calder Navigation) as well as "completely" artificial canals (e.g. Rochdale Canal).

== Canals in England ==
Canal	Length	Locks	Max boat length (ft)	Width (ft)	Where	Year opened	Year abandoned	Navigable status
Aire and Calder Navigation	34 mi (55 km)	12	200	20	NE	1704		Fully navigable
Andover Canal	22 mi (35 km)	24	65	8.5	S	1794	1859	Abandoned - majority of the route now lost, some small sections in water
Arbury Canals	6 mi (10 km)	13				1786	1819, 1973	
Ashby-de-la-Zouch Canal	22 mi (35 km)	0	72	7	M	1804	1918, 1966	Under restoration - part open, part under restoration
Ashton Canal	6 mi (10 km)	18	70	7	NW	1796	1961	Fully navigable - restored 1974
Barnsley Canal	14.5 mi (23 km)	15	84	14	NW	1799	1893, 1946	Abandoned - restoration plans on hiatus
Basingstoke Canal	32 mi (51 km)	29	68	13	S	1794	1910	Part navigable - Restored 1991, remainder of route lost
Baybridge Canal	3.5 mi (6 km)	2				1826	1875	
Beaumont Cut	0.6 mi (1 km)	0				1832	1932	Abandoned - line of canal in water
Bentley Canal	3.4 mi (5 km)	10				1845	1953	Abandoned - majority of the route now lost, stub in Wednesfield used for mooring
Beverley Beck	0.5 mi (1 km)	1	65	17.5	NE	1744		Fully navigable
Birmingham and Warwick Junction Canal	2.5 mi (4 km)	6	70	7	M	1844		Fully navigable
Birmingham Canal Navigations	29.8 mi (48 km)	34	70	7	M	1772–1794		
Birmingham and Fazeley Canal	20.5 mi (33 km)	44	70	7	M	1789		Fully navigable
Black Bear Canal	8 mi (13 km)					1804	1965	Abandoned - majority of the route now lost, some small sections in water
Blyth Navigation	7 mi (11 km)	6	50	14	EA	1761	1911	Abandoned - line of canal in water
Bradford Canal	3.5 mi (6 km)	10				1774	1922	Abandoned - restoration being investigated
Bridgewater Canal	40 mi (64 km)	0	72	14.75	NW	1761		Fully navigable bar short missing section at junction with Manchester Ship Canal
Bridgwater and Taunton Canal, Somerset	14.5 mi (23 km)	6	50	9.83	SW	1827	1907	Fully navigable - Restored 1994
Bude Canal	35 mi (56 km)	2	20	5.5	SW	1823	1891	Abandoned - majority of the route now lost
Caistor Canal	4 mi (6 km)	6	61.5	15.25	N	1793	1855	Abandoned - line of canal in water
Calder and Hebble Navigation	21.5 mi (35 km)	38	55	14	NE	1794		Fully navigable
Caldon Canal	18 mi (29 km)	17	72	7	NM	1779		Fully navigable
Cann Quarry Canal	2 mi (3 km)					1825	1839	Abandoned - majority of the route now lost
Car Dyke	85 mi (137 km)	0				120 (appr)	1200 (appr)	Abandoned - line of canal in water
Chard Canal	13.5 mi (22 km)	4				1842	1868	Abandoned - some of the line still traceable
Charnwood Forest Canal	6 mi (10 km)					1794	1808	Abandoned - majority of the route now lost
Chelmer and Blackwater Navigation	13.8 mi (22 km)	13	60	16	EA	1797		Fully navigable
Chesterfield Canal	45.5 mi (73 km), now 31.5 mi (51 km)	62	72	7	NE	1777	1907 (part)	Under restoration - Less than 9 miles (14 km) of the original route remain to be restored to link the two navigable sections
Chichester Canal	4.5 mi (7 km)	3	85	18	S	1822	1906	Part navigable - remainder of route in water but unnavigable
Cinderford Canal	1.25 mi (2 km)	0				1797	1810 ?	Abandoned - majority of the route now lost
City Canal	1 mi (2 km)	2				1805	1829	Abandoned - Route has been almost completely reconstructed to form the South Dock of the West India Docks
Coombe Hill Canal	2.75 mi (4 km)	1				1796	1876	Abandoned - line of canal in water
Coventry Canal	32.7 mi (53 km)	13	72	7	M	1769, 1788		Fully navigable
Cromford Canal	14.5 mi (23 km)	14				1794	1900	Under restoration
Croydon Canal	9.25 mi (15 km)	28			SE	1809	1836	Abandoned - majority of the route now lost
Dearne and Dove Canal	9.8 mi (16 km)	19	58	14.83	NE	1804	1961	Abandoned - restoration being investigated
Derby Canal	14 mi (23 km)	17	72	14	NE	1796		Abandoned - restoration being investigated
Derby and Sandiacre Canal	14.5 mi (23 km)	9	72	14	NE	1793	1964	Under restoration
Digbeth Branch Canal	1.25 mi (2.0 km)	6	72	7	M	1799		Fully navigable
Donnington Wood Canal	5.5 mi (9 km)					1767	1904	Abandoned - majority of the route now lost
Driffield Navigation, East Yorkshire	11 mi (18 km)	6	61	14.5	NE	1767	1955 (part)	Fully navigable
Droitwich Canal	7.3 mi (12 km)	15	71.5	7.08	M	1771, 1854	1939	Fully navigable - restored 2011
Dudley Canal	10.3 mi (17 km)				M	1770, 1792	1948	1973 (part) full restoration requires diversion to avoid unrepairable tunnel
Eardington Forge Canal	0.5 mi (1 km)	1				1782	1889	
Erewash Canal	11.8 mi (19 km)	14	78	12.5	NE	1779	1962 (part)	Fully navigable - restored 1973
Exeter Ship Canal	5.2 mi (8 km)	2	122	26.25	SW	1563		Fully navigable
Fairbottom Branch Canal	1 mi (2 km)	0			NW	1792	1932	Abandoned - majority of the route now lost, some small sections in water
Fletcher's Canal	1.5 mi (2 km)	2				1800	1952	Abandoned - majority of the route now lost
Foss Dyke	11.3 mi (18 km)	1	74.5	15.17	E	1121		Fully navigable
Galton's Canal	1.4 mi (2 km)	1				1822	1897	Abandoned - line of canal in water
Glastonbury Canal	14 mi (23 km)	2				1834	1854	Abandoned - majority of the route now lost, some small sections in water
Glastonbury Canal (medieval)	1.1 mi (2 km)	0				10th C	14-16th C	Abandoned - majority of the route now lost
Gloucester and Sharpness Canal	16.5 mi (27 km)	2	240	30	SW	1826		Fully navigable
Grand Junction Canal	129.4 mi (208 km)	90	72	14.7	M	1800, 1805		Fully navigable
Grand Surrey Canal	4 mi (6 km)	1				1810	1940	Abandoned - majority of the route now lost
Grand Union Canal	286.3 mi (461 km)	236	72	14	M	1927		Fully navigable (bar Buckingham Arm)
Grand Union Canal (old)	24.3 mi (39 km)	17	72	7	EM	1814		Fully navigable
Grand Western Canal	10.5 mi (17 km)	0			SW	1838		Under restoration
Grantham Canal	33 mi (53 km)	18	75	14	EM	1797	1936	Under restoration
Grosvenor Canal	0.8 mi (1 km)	1				1825	1858, 1925	Abandoned - majority of the route now lost
Hackney Canal	0.6 mi (1 km)	1				1843	1928	Abandoned - majority of the route now lost
Hatherton Canal	4 mi (6 km)	8	70	7	NM	1860	1955	Under restoration, but part of original route unsuitable for reopening so will be diverted.
Herefordshire and Gloucestershire Canal	34 mi (55 km)	22	70	7	W	1798, 1845	1881	Under restoration
Hertford Union Canal	1.3 mi (2 km)	3	78	14.5	SE	1830		Fully navigable
Hollinwood Branch Canal	4.5 mi (7 km)	4	70	7	NW	1792	1932	Under restoration
Hollingwood Common Canal	2 mi (3 km)	0				?	?	Abandoned
Horncastle Canal	11 mi (18 km)	12				1802	1889	Abandoned - line of canal in water
Huddersfield Broad Canal	3.8 mi (6 km)	9	57.5	14.17	NE	1780		Fully navigable
Huddersfield Narrow Canal	19.9 mi (32 km)	74	70	7	NE	1811		Fully navigable
Ipswich and Stowmarket Navigation	15.9 mi (26 km)	15	55	14	EA	1793	1934	Under restoration
Islington Branch Canal	0.6 mi (1 km)	0			NW	1801	1952	Abandoned
Itchen Navigation	10 mi (16 km)	17				1710	1869	Under restoration
Kennet and Avon Canal	86.5 mi (139 km)	105	70	12.5	SW	1727, 1810	(1950)	Fully navigable - restored and reopened 1990
Kensington Canal	1.75 mi (3 km)	1				1828	1859, 1967	Abandoned - route now lost
Ketley Canal	1.5 mi (2 km)	1				1788	1880	Abandoned - majority of the route now lost, some short sections in water
Lancaster Canal	60.9 mi (98 km)	14	72	14.5	NW	1797, 1825	1955	2002 (part) - Under ongoing restoration
Leeds and Liverpool Canal	142.6 mi (229 km)	105	62	14	NE, NW	1816		Fully navigable
Leicestershire and Northamptonshire Union Canal	48 mi (77 km)	22	72	13	EM	1807		Fully navigable - part of Grand Union Canal
Leominster Canal	18 mi (29 km)	16				1794	1858	Abandoned - majority of the route now lost
Leven Canal	3.25 mi (5 km)	1				1805	1935	Abandoned - line of canal in water
Lichfield Canal	7 mi (11 km)	30	70	7	M	1797	1955	Under restoration
Limehouse Cut	2 mi (3 km)	0	88	19	SE	1766		Fully navigable
Liskeard and Looe Union Canal	6 mi (10 km)	25				1828	1910	Abandoned - majority of the route now lost, some small sections in water
Llangollen Canal	46.3 mi (75 km)	21	70’	6.83	W	1808		Fully navigable
Louth Navigation	11.8 mi (19 km)	8	72	15	NE	1770	1924	Abandoned - line of canal in water
Lydney Canal	1 mi (2 km)	1	100	24	SW	1821	1977	2005 (part) - Under restoration
Macclesfield Canal	26.3 mi (42 km)	13	70	7	NW	1831		Fully navigable
Manchester, Bolton and Bury Canal	12.9 mi (21 km)	17	68	14.17	NW	1797, 1808	1941, 1961	Under restoration
Manchester Ship Canal	37.4 mi (60 km)	5	600	65	NW	1894		Fully navigable
Market Weighton Canal	9.5 mi (15 km)	1	70	14.83	NE	1782	1971	Part navigable - remainder of route a mix of in water but unnavigable, and route lost
Melton Mowbray Navigation	11 mi (18 km)	12			EM	1797	1877	Under restoration
Middle Level Navigations	90 mi (145 km)	7	80	11	E	1608–1832		Fully navigable
Montgomery Canal	33 mi (53 km)	24	70	6.83	W	1821	1944	1996 (part) - Under restoration
Newcastle-under-Lyme Canal	3.75 mi (6 km)	0				1800	1935	Abandoned - majority of the route now lost
Newcastle-under-Lyme Junction Canal	1 mi (2 km)	0						Abandoned - majority of the route now lost
New Junction Canal	5.5 mi (9 km)	1	215	22.5	NE	1905		Fully navigable
Newport Pagnell Canal	1.25 mi (2 km)	7				1817	1864	Abandoned - majority of the route now lost
North Walsham and Dilham Canal	7.3 mi (12 km)	6	50	12.33	EA	1826	1927 (part)	Part navigable - remainder of route in water but unnavigable
Nottingham Canal	14.7 mi (24 km)	18	81	14.5	NE	1796	1937 (part)	Part navigable - remainder of route partly in water but unnavigable, partly lost
Nutbrook Canal	4.5 mi (7 km)	13				1796	1895	Abandoned - majority of the route now lost, some small sections in water
Oakham Canal	15.5 mi (25 km)	18				1802	1847	Abandoned - majority of the route now lost, some small sections in water
Ouse Navigation	22 mi (35 km)	19				1812	1950	Fully navigable
Oxford Canal	78 mi (126 km)	43	70	6.83	M	1774, 1790		Fully navigable
Par Canal	2.25 mi (4 km)	3				1847	1873	
Parnall's Canal	0.5 mi (1 km)	0				1720	1732	
Peak Forest Canal	14.8 mi (24 km)	16	70	7	NW	1805	1960	Fully navigable - restored 1974
Petworth Canal	1.25 mi (2 km)	2				1795	1826	Abandoned - majority of the route now lost, some small sections in water
Pidcock's Canal	1.5 mi (2 km)	3				1789	1845	Abandoned - line of canal in water
Pocklington Canal	9.5 mi (15 km)	9	57	14.25	NE	1818	1932	Under restoration - largely navigable
Portsmouth and Arundel Canal	28 mi (45 km)	6				1823	1847/1926	Abandoned - majority of the route now lost
Regent's Canal	8.6 mi (14 km)	13	72	14.5	SE	1820		Fully navigable
Ribble Link	3 mi (5 km)	9	62	10.5	NW	2002		Fully navigable
Ripon Canal	2.5 mi (4 km)	3	57	14.25	NE	1773	1906	Fully navigable - restored 1996
River Soar Navigation	21.9 mi (35 km)	18	72	13	EM	1794		Fully navigable
River Lee Navigation	29.1 mi (47 km)	22	85	16	SE	1577, 1769		Fully navigable
River Weaver Navigation (incl. Weston Canal)	71 mi (114 km)	5	196	35	NW	1732		Fully navigable
Rochdale Canal	32 mi (51 km)	91	74	14.17	NW	1800		Fully navigable (bar some branches)
Rolle Canal	6 mi (10 km)	2				1827	1871	Under restoration
Royal Military Canal	19 mi (31 km)	0			SE	1804		Fully navigable
Runcorn and Weston Canal	72 ft (22 m)	2	72	18.4	NW	1859	1939	
St Columb Canal	13 mi (21 km)							
Salisbury and Southampton Canal	13 mi (21 km)	16				1802	1808	
Sankey Canal	15.2 mi (24 km)	11	72	13.83	NW	1757	1963	
Selby Canal	6 mi (10 km)	2	78.5	16.5	NE	1776		
Sheffield and South Yorkshire Navigation	28 mi (45 km)	24	61.5	15.25	NE	1802		
Shrewsbury Canal	17 mi (27 km)	34	81	7	W	1797	1944	
Shropshire Canal	10.5 mi (17 km)	3				1791	1912	
Shropshire Union Canal	76.5 mi (123 km)	51	72	7	NM	1835		
Sir John Glynne's Canal	1 mi (2 km)					1768	1779	
Sir Nigel Gresley's Canal	3 mi (5 km)	0				1776	1857	
Sleaford Navigation	12.5 mi (20 km)	7	70	15	NE	1794	1940	
Somerset Coal Canal	18 mi (29 km)				SW	1802	1898	1986 (part)
Southwick Ship Canal	1.75 mi (2.8 km)	1	240	40	SE	1855		
Staffordshire and Worcestershire Canal	46.1 mi (74 km)	43	70	7	NM	1772		
Stamford Canal	6.5 mi (10 km)	10				1670	1863	
Stainforth and Keadby Canal	14.9 mi (24 km)	3	61.67	17	NE	1802		
Stockport Branch Canal	4.9 mi (8 km)	0			NW	1797	1962	
Stort Navigation	13.8 mi (22 km)	15	86	13.25	SE	1769		
Stourbridge Canal	7.8 mi (13 km)	21	70	7	M	1779		
Stover Canal	1.7 mi (3 km)	5				1792	1943	
Stratford-upon-Avon Canal	25.5 mi (41 km)	56	70	7	M	1802, 1816		
Stroudwater Navigation	8 mi (13 km)	13	70	15.5	SW	1779		
Tame Valley Canal	8.5 mi (14 km)	13	72	7	M	1844		
Tavistock Canal	4 mi (6 km)	2				1803	1873	
Thames and Medway Canal	6.5 mi (10 km)	1	24.5	6.5	SE	1824	1935	
Thames and Severn Canal	28.8 mi (46 km)	44	74	12.75	SW	1789	1933	
Titchfield Canal								
Tremadoc Canal	1.5 mi (2 km)	0				1815	1840	
Trent and Mersey Canal	93.4 mi (150 km)	76	72	7	NE	1777		
Ulverston Canal	1.5 mi (2 km)	1	112	65	NW	1796	1944	
Uttoxeter Canal	13 mi (21 km)	19			NM	1811	1849	2005 (part)
Walsall Canal	9.6 mi (15 km)	16	72	7	M	1785–1841		
Wardle Canal	0.1 mi (0.2 km)	1			NM	1829		
Warwick and Napton Canal	14.2 mi (23 km)	25	72	7	M	1794		
Warwick and Birmingham Canal	24.3 mi (39 km)	28	70	7	M	1794		
Wednesbury Old Canal	4.4 mi (7 km)	3	70	7	M	1769	1955 (part)	
Westport Canal	3.3 mi (5 km)	1				1840	1875	
Wey and Arun Junction Canal	23 mi (37 km)	26	68	11.5	S	1816	1871	in progress
Wey and Godalming Navigations	19.5 mi (31 km)	16	72	13.83	S	1651, 1760		
Wilts and Berks Canal	52.5 mi (84 km)	42	72	7	SW	1810	1914	1995 (part)
Wombridge Canal	1.75 mi (3 km)	1				1788	1921	
Worcester and Birmingham Canal	30 mi (48 km)	58	71.5	7	M	1815		Fully navigable
Wyrley and Essington Canal	23.5 mi (38 km)	39	70	7	M	1797	1900 (part)	

== Canals in Northern Ireland ==
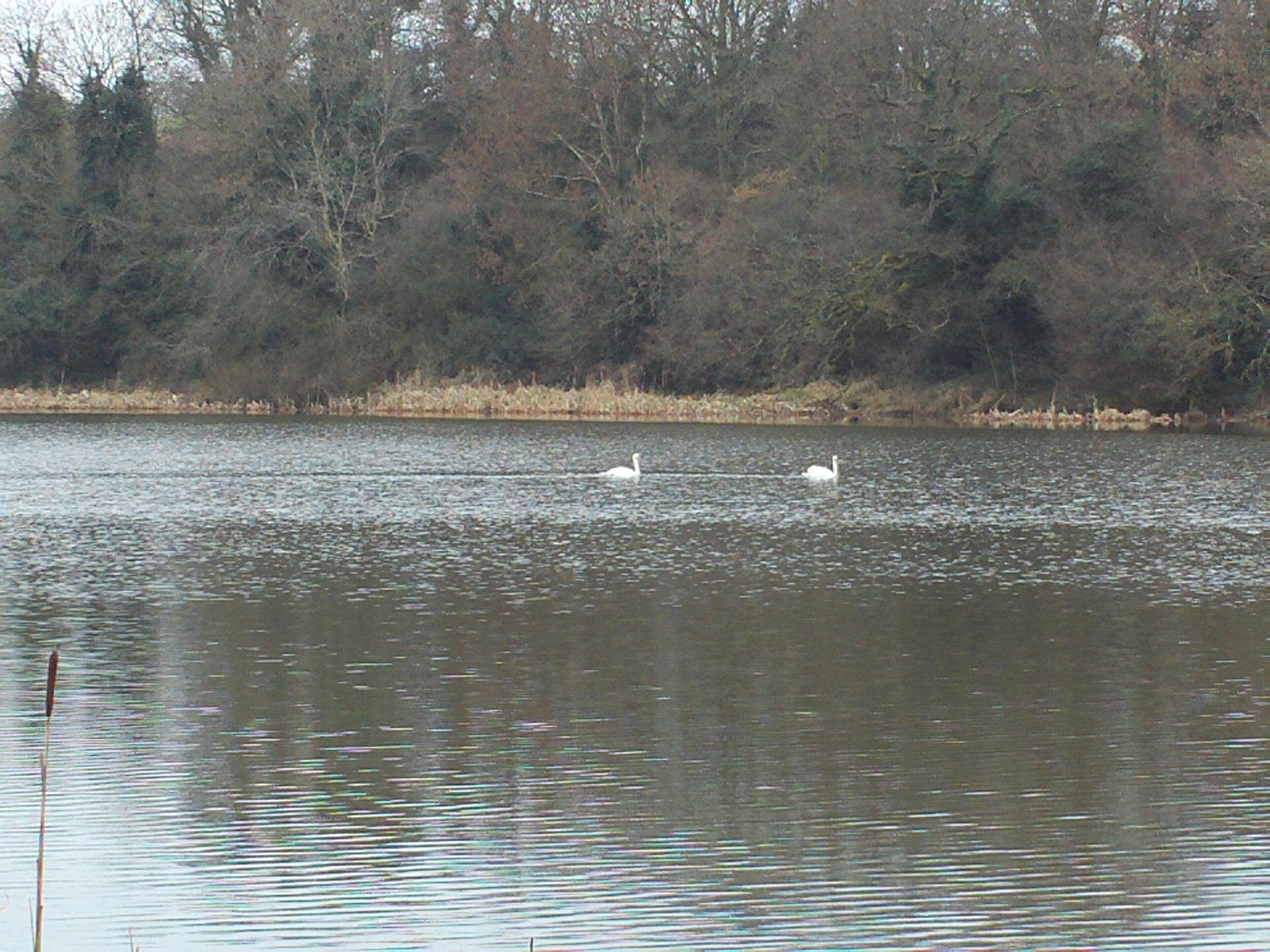
Lagan Navigational Canal (disused) at Broadwater, near Aghalee

Canal	Length (miles)	Locks	Year opened	Year abandoned	Year restored
Broharris Canal	2		1820		
Coalisland Canal	7.2	7	1787	1954	
Dukart's Canal		3	1777	1787	
Lagan Canal	27	27	1802	1958	
Newry Canal	21	12	1742	1938	
Shannon–Erne Waterway	39	16	1780	1948	1994
Strabane Canal	4	2	1792	1962	
Ulster Canal	46	26	1842	1931	

== Canals in Scotland ==
Canal	Length (miles)	Locks	Max boat length (ft)	Width (ft)	Year opened	Year abandoned	Year restored
Aberdeenshire Canal	18	18			1805	1854	
Buchan Canal							
Caledonian Canal	62	29	150	35	1822		
Carlingwark Lane Canal	1.5	0			1765	1840	
Crinan Canal	9	15	86.75	19.65	1817		
Dingwall Canal	1.1	0			1816	1840	
Forth and Clyde Canal	35	38	68.58	19.75	1790	1963	2002
Glasgow, Paisley and Johnstone Canal	11	0			1811	1881	
Inchfad Canal	0.25	0			19th century		
Inverarnan Canal	0.33	0			1844	c. 1870	
Monkland Canal	12.25	18	71	14	1794	1942	
Stevenston Canal	2.25	0		13	1772	1830	
Union Canal	31.5	3	63	12.5	1822	1930	2000

== Canals in Wales ==
Canal	Length (miles)	Locks	Max boat length (ft)	Width (ft)	Year opened	Year abandoned	Year restored
Aberdare Canal	6.75	2			1812	1900	
Cyfarthfa Canal	2				1770s	1830s	
Glamorganshire Canal	25	52			1798	1898, 1942	
Glan-y-wern Canal	c. 1.5				by 1790	c. 1810	
Kidwelly and Llanelly Canal	18	8			1768, 1837	1865	
Llangollen Canal	46.3	21	70	6.83	1808		
Monmouthshire, Brecon and Abergavenny Canal	35	48	63	9.17	1796	1962	1970
Montgomery Canal	33	24	70	6.83	1821	1944	1996 (part)
Neath and Tennant Canal	21.5	21	60	9	1795, 1824	1934	1990 (part)
Swansea Canal	16.5	36	65	7.5	1798	1931	

== Proposed canal routes ==
=== Active projects ===
- Bedford and Milton Keynes Waterway: Connection from Grand Union Canal at Milton Keynes to the River Great Ouse near Bedford. This link will finally enable broad-beam boats to travel from the north to the south of the inland waterway network.
- Fens Waterways Link: The Fens Waterways Link comprises several new waterways and improvements to current routes. It will create new circular routes and in conjunction with the Milton Keynes and Bedford Waterway, it will be connected to the rest of the country's waterways via the Great Ouse.
- Maidenhead Waterways: Making the York Stream and other parts of the Maidenhead Waterways fully navigable for boats and linking to other nearby canals and navigable rivers.

=== Proposals ===
- Grand Union Canal (Slough Branch): Extending Slough Arm of the Grand Union Canal south to join the River Thames.
- Rother Link: Planned canal which would connect the Chesterfield Canal at Killamarsh, via the River Rother through to the Sheffield and South Yorkshire Navigation, thus creating a new cruising ring and encouraging boats to visit the Chesterfield Canal.
- Upper Avon Extension (Warwick): This proposed connection from River Avon to Grand Union Canal via Warwick is subject to some landowner opposition.
- Foxton Inclined Plane: Restoration of the wide-beam Foxton Inclined Plane, accompanied by a solution to bypass Watford Locks, would allow wide-beam boats to traverse the Leicester Line of the Grand Union Canal.

=== Former proposals ===
- Grand Contour Canal: First proposed in 1943, was intended to connect the major industrial centres of London, Bristol, Southampton, Coventry, Birmingham, Nottingham, Derby, Chester, Manchester, Blackburn, Bradford, Hartlepool and Newcastle.
- London to Portsmouth canal: Also known as the Grand Southern Canal, and proposed on several occasions, this route would utilise existing canals and rivers, with new links constructed, to provide an overland route between the cities of London and Portsmouth, removing the need to enter the English Channel.
- Berks and Hants Canal, a proposed link from the terminus of the Basingstoke Canal at Basingstoke to the Kennet and Avon Canal, rejected twice by Parliament after landowner opposition.
- Polbrock Canal, approved by Parliament in the Bodmin Canal Act 1797 (37 Geo. 3. c. 29), this link between the north and south coasts of Cornwall would have joined the River Camel with the Fowey at Bodmin.
- Beat Bank Branch Canal: an abortive canal intended to link with the Stockport Branch Canal.

== See also ==
- List of canal tunnels in the United Kingdom
- Waterway restoration in the United Kingdom
- List of rivers in the United Kingdom
