= Albion Mills =

Albion Mills may refer to:

- Albion Mills, Southwark, London
- Albion Mill, Ancoats, Manchester
- Albion Mills Retail Park, Wakefield
- Nelstrops Albion Flour Mills, also known as Albion Mills, Stockport
- Mills mentioned in William Blake's poem And did those feet in ancient time
