= Contour canal =

Canal which follows the contour of land

A contour canal is an artificially-dug navigable canal which closely follows the contour line of the land it traverses, in order to avoid costly engineering works such as:

- Digging a cutting or tunnel through higher ground;
- Building an embankment or aqueduct over lower ground, or;
- Constructing a canal lock (or series of locks) to change the level of the canal.

Because of this, these canals are characterised by their meandering course.

In the United Kingdom, many of the canals built in the period from 1770 to 1800 were contour canals - for example, the Thames & Severn Canal completed in 1789, and the Oxford Canal completed in 1790. Later canals tended to be much straighter and more direct - a good example is the Shropshire Union Canal engineered by Thomas Telford.

== See also ==
- Canals of the United Kingdom
- Grand Contour Canal - proposed, but never built
- Lingqu Canal - the oldest contour canal in the world
