= Beat Bank Branch Canal =

Abortive canal near Manchester, England

Specifications
- Status: abandoned before completion

History
- Original owner: Ashton Canal Company
- Date of act: 1793
- Date closed: 1798

Geography
- Start point: Beat Bank, Denton
- End point: South Reddish
- Connects to: Stockport Branch Canal

The Beat Bank Branch Canal was an abortive canal near Manchester, England. It was to leave the Stockport Branch Canal in South Reddish and it was to be lock free but with a short tunnel. It was to follow the contour above the right bank of the River Tame, firstly in a northerly direction and then easterly as it followed the meandering course of the river upstream. It was to terminate at or near to the coalmining hamlet of Beat Bank in Denton where it could also secure supplies of coal from nearby mines at Haughton Green.

== History ==
The Stockport Branch Canal and the Beat Bank Branch Canal were both authorised by an act of Parliament, the Manchester and Stockport Canal Act 1793 (33 Geo. 3. c. 21), obtained by the Proprietors of the Ashton Canal in March 1793, just nine months after the Manchester and Oldham Canal Act 1792 (32 Geo. 3. c. 84) authorised the main line of the canal. This second act also authorised the Hollinwood Branch Canal, and allowed the oroprietors to raise £30,000 to fund the construction of all three branches. The Hollingwood branch opened in late 1796, and the Stockport branch followed in January 1797. Construction of the Beat Bank branch was difficult, as it was on a clay slope at the edge of the Tame Valley, which was liable to slippage, and once the Ashton Canal Company had secured an adequate coal-carrying business on the Hollinwood Branch Canal and the Fairbottom Branch Canal, they decided to suspend all work on the unfinished Beat Bank Branch Canal. They informed William Hulton, the owner of the coal mines at Denton, that they could not afford to complete the work.

The Ashton Canal Act 1798 (38 Geo. 3. c. xxxii) allowed the canal company to raise further money and abandon the unfinished canal. Its progress through Parliament was opposed by Hulton, who declined an initial offer of the unfinished canal, but he was unsuccessful in his opposition. Some of the money raised was used to pay compensation to land and property owners along the line of the canal for loss or damage caused by the activities of the canal company.

== Route ==
Only a very short length of the canal was put in water at Reddish and this was known as the Beat Bank or Reddish Private Branch. Just beyond the watered section, the plans showed a 110-yard (100 m) tunnel, but construction of this was not started. Beyond the tunnel, most of the bed was excavated for a distance of around 0.6 miles (0.97 km). No work was done on the section between there and the site of a proposed reservoir, and then another section of around 1 mile (1.6 km) was built, but the final length to the collieries was not.

Sections of this canal still remain along Reddish Vale Allotments, to the right of Ross Lave Lane and past the M60 viaduct. The engineers who built the M60 viaduct used the same contours as those who built the Beat Bank branch canal and subsequently severed it.

The 1848 Ordnance Survey map shows about 300 yards (270 m) of canal running from the junction towards the site of the tunnel, but there are no buildings to indicate what it might have been used for. By 1893, only about half of it was left, and by 1907, an engineering works had been built beside the railway, and the remains of the canal are shown as little more than a widening of the main line at the location of the former junction.

== Points of interest ==
Point	Coordinates (Links to map resources)	OS Grid Ref	Notes
East end of excavated section	53.4421°N 2.1249°W	SJ917939	section 5
Course cut by motorway	53.4410°N 2.1316°W	SJ913938	section 5
West end of excavated section	53.4430°N 2.1409°W	SJ907940	section 5
East end of excavated section	53.4403°N 2.1475°W	SJ903937	section 3
East end of tunnel site	53.4339°N 2.1524°W	SJ899930	section 3
End of watered section	53.4328°N 2.1593°W	SJ895928	section 1
Junction with Stockport Canal	53.4319°N 2.1626°W	SJ892928	

== See also ==
- Canals of the United Kingdom
- History of the British canal system

== Bibliography ==
- Dean, Richard (2001). Canals of Manchester. Historical Canal Maps (No. 3). M&M Baldwin. ISBN 0-947712-12-7.
- Hadfield, Charles; Biddle, Gordon (1970). The Canals of North West England (Vol 2). David and Charles. ISBN 0-7153-4992-9.
