= Fairbottom Bobs =

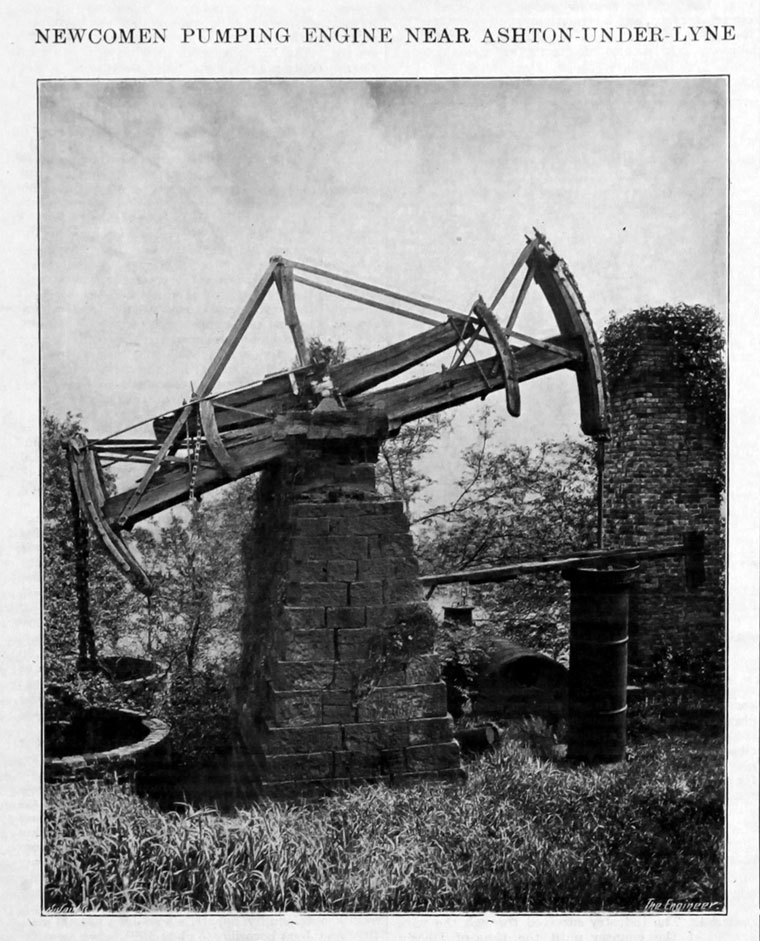
- On the original site, 1886

Origins
- Type: Newcomen-type atmospheric engine
- Designer: Thomas Newcomen
- Date: 1760 or 1764
- Former operator: Cannel Colliery, Fairbottom near Ashton-under-Lyne, England

Measurements
- Cylinders: 1
- Bore: 28 inches (71 cm)
- Stroke: 8 feet (2.4 m)

Preservation
- Collection: Henry Ford Museum
- Location: The Henry Ford, Dearborn, Michigan, United States; 42°18′12.90″N 83°14′2.68″W

Fairbottom Bobs is a Newcomen-type beam engine that was used in the 18th century as a pumping engine to drain a colliery near Ashton-under-Lyne. It is probably the world's second-oldest surviving steam engine. (Note: The Newcomen Memorial Engine of 1725 at Dartmouth is generally considered to be the oldest survivor.) The engine was installed at Cannel Colliery at Fairbottom near Ashton-under-Lyne around 1760 or 1764. It became known locally as Fairbottom Bobs. (Note: Crowley names it "Fairbottom Bob".)

The engine's origin is unclear. It was possibly first installed at Norbury Coal Works about 9 mi (14 km) to the west from where the Manchester Mercury for 9 October 1764 carried an advertisement for a 'Fire Engine' (Note: 'Fire Engine' was a common contemporary term for a Newcomen engine (i.e. any engine) around this period. The name survives in place- and pub names.) for sale. Its cylinder dimensions matched the Fairbottom engine. (Note: Cylinder dimensions were not standardised on early engines, yet as the cast cylinder represents the main investment in an engine they would remain constant over its lifetime. The cylinder dimensions are the crucial identification factor for many early engines, cf. Old Bess.)

The engine's design and construction have been described as "primitive". It had a power rating of 11 horsepower. Its cylinder has an 28 inches (710 mm) bore and 8 feet (2.4 m) stroke, driving a water pump with a 8 inches (200 mm) bore that could raise water from a depth of 240 ft at a rate of 14 strokes per minute. The timber beam consisted of single wooden king post with wrought iron straps and wooden arch heads at each end. Iron chains linked the beam to the piston rods. An auxiliary arch head drove the engine's air pump. The beam was supported on a pillar of dressed stone resembling a thick wall or narrow pyramid, rather than on the wall of an engine house, a feature found on other engines of this age but rare later. Although foundations and stone floors survive on its site, there is no evidence of an engine house or roof to protect the engine from the weather.

As was common for mine drainage, pumping at one pit could drain water across a number of pits. The water produced was used to maintain water levels in the Ashton Canal by draining into the Fairbottom Branch Canal at Fennyfield Bridge, just south of the engine. In 1801 the canal company was approached to contribute to the costs of its refurbishment, work that may have been carried out by Bateman and Sherratt engine builders of Manchester. The original pit appears to have been worked out in the 1820s, although others nearby were working as 'Fairbottom Pits'. Draining the old mine workings and supplying water to the canal kept the engine working after the Cannel Colliery closed until the engine was abandoned in 1826 or 1827.

== Preservation ==
Fairbottom Bobs is preserved at the Henry Ford Museum in Dearborn, Michigan.

The engine and its site were considered antiquarian by the end of the 19th century. Photographs of the site taken in 1886 showed it in a reasonable state of preservation. When Henry Ford was collecting exhibits for his new museum in 1927 a major theme for the museum was 'Americana' but he also sought older industrial archaeological exhibits from Europe. His agent, Herbert F. Morton, found the engine although it had been derelict for a hundred years and was in poor condition. Its owner Lord Stamford gave the engine to be preserved in the museum. The engine and its masonry were dismantled and re-assembled in the museum. Its wooden beam was too rotten to be preserved and a replacement was made. The condition and finish of this new beam were finished unrealistically more smoothly than the original, which was typical for Ford's approach to 'conservation'. Its wagon boiler was also acquired by the museum but the engine is now displayed with a haystack boiler from another engine, similar to one believed to have been used originally.

Some features on the Fairbottom site remain in situ including the chimney base. Archaeological digs took place in 1982, 1990 & 2000 to investigate the remains.
