= Daisy Nook =

Country park in Greater Manchester, England

Coordinates: 53.505°N 2.123°W

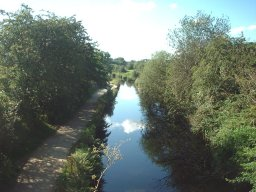
Canal at Daisy Nook

Daisy Nook is a country park in Failsworth, Greater Manchester, England, which runs through the Medlock Valley.

== History ==
The name Daisy Nook came from a book by Benjamin Brierley titled 'A day out' or 'A Summer Ramble'. Brierley asked his friend Charles Potter, an Oldham Artist, to draw an imaginary place called Daisy Nook. Potter came to nearby Waterhouses to complete his drawing - and from then on the area was known as Daisy Nook.

Brierley's description of Daisy Nook was 'Two Banks seemed to have opened to receive a group of neat whitewashed cottages and after filling them with happiness, surrounded them with a curtain of trees, to shelter them from the outside world. Most of the cottages have gardens attached, growing flowers and vegetables, and there a small orchard displaying its ripening apples'.

Most of Daisy Nook now belongs to the National Trust after it was left to them by the late James Lublam, J.P. 'in order that the fields and woods be kept as a pleasure area'. The park is maintained by Oldham Metropolitan Borough Council.

Daisy Nook hosts an annual Easter Fair along Stannybrook Road - depicted by Lowry in one of his paintings.

== Crime Lake ==
Crime Lake is a small, shallow lake halfway between Woodhouses and the Visitors' Centre and forms part of the Country Park. The lake was formed in 1794 as an unintended result of canal works. At the time of construction, a culvert was built under the canal to accommodate a brook that was severed by its course. A landslip blocked the culvert and the waters were impounded on the offside of the canal, eventually merging with the canal to form the lake. It was officially known as Crime Bank Reservoir, but it is far better known by its later name of Crime Lake.

In another painting, Crime Lake, L.S. Lowry depicted the lake as it was in 1942, with an industrial backdrop and many boaters on the water. The lake still attracts visitors due to its scenery and wildlife.

The name 'Crime' may have come from a local word for "meadow" or a local name for a particular meadow, or after a sinister murder that took place along the canal many years ago.

== Hollinwood Branch Canal ==
Daisy Nook is centred on the disused Hollinwood Branch Canal. The canal ran from Fairfield in nearby Droylsden to Hollinwood and opened in 1797. It runs through Daisy Nook, Woodhouses and Failsworth before entering Hollinwood in Oldham. The canal also has a branch which ran to Bardsley in Oldham, known as the Fairbottom Branch Canal.

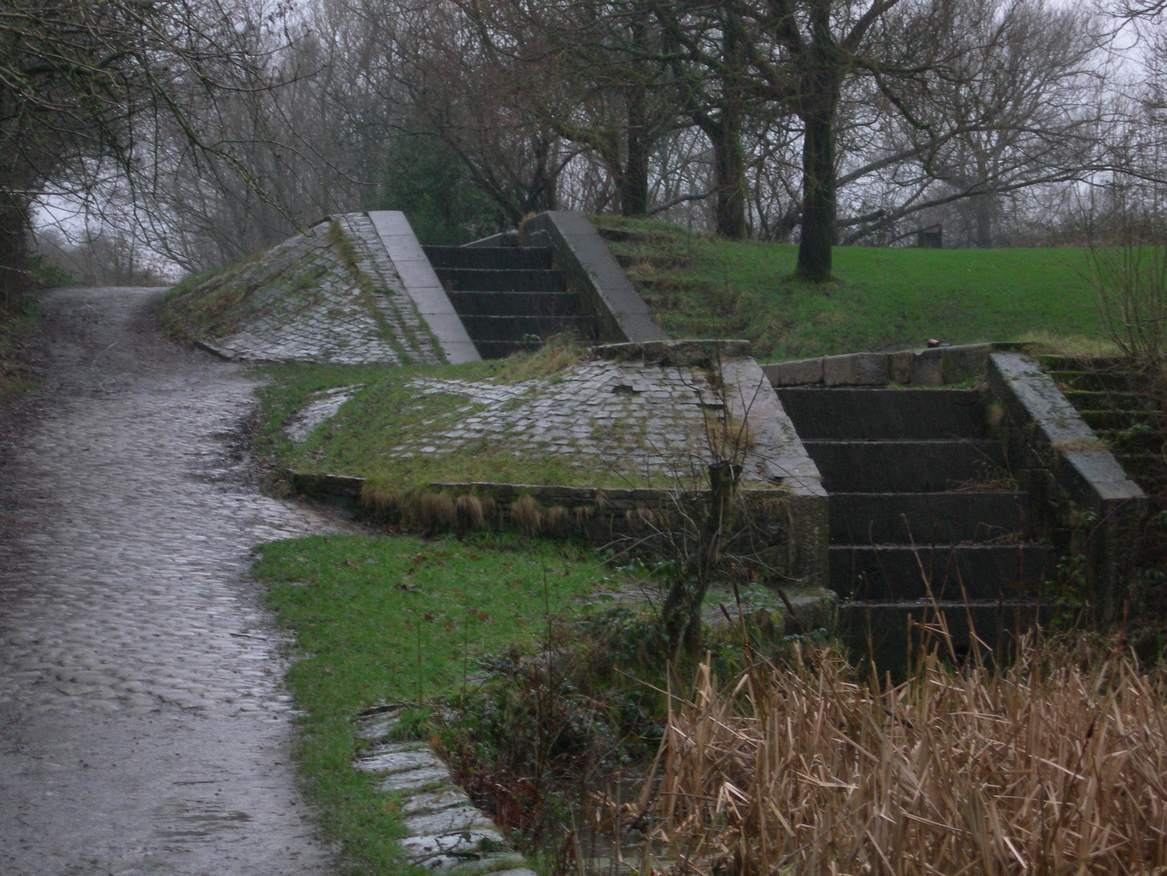
Staircase locks

The canal and series of aqueducts are the centre of a campaign to restore the waterway by the Hollinwood Canal Society, which is run by local residents and waterway enthusiasts.

== Painting of the park by L. S. Lowry ==
On 8 June 2007 a 1946 work by L. S. Lowry entitled "Good Friday, Daisy Nook" was sold for £3,772,000, the highest price paid for one of his paintings at auction. The painting depicts the park in party mood a year after World War II.
