= William Nelstrop =

British miller and political figure (1801–1877)

- Born: 28 November 1801; Ackworth, West Yorkshire, England
- Died: 10 September 1877 (aged 75)
- Occupations: Miller; political figure

William Nelstrop (28 November 1801 – 10 September 1877) was a British miller and political figure. Hailing from Ackworth, West Yorkshire, he began milling at the Nelstrop family farm before establishing the steam-powered Albion Mills on Lancashire Hill in the Heaton Norris suburb of Stockport in 1820. Nelstrops became a thriving producer of flour in the 19th century and is still a successful firm today. As a wealthy entrepreneur, Nelstrop became a major figure in Stockport, and became mayor of the town. He rejected a knighthood from Queen Victoria for helping suppress the Anti-Corn Law Riots in the 1840s, expressing sympathy with the poor. He passed the family firm on, and it is in its fifth generation.
