= Nelstrops Albion Flour Mills =

Corn mill in Stockport, England

Coordinates: 53°25′6″N 2°9′43″W

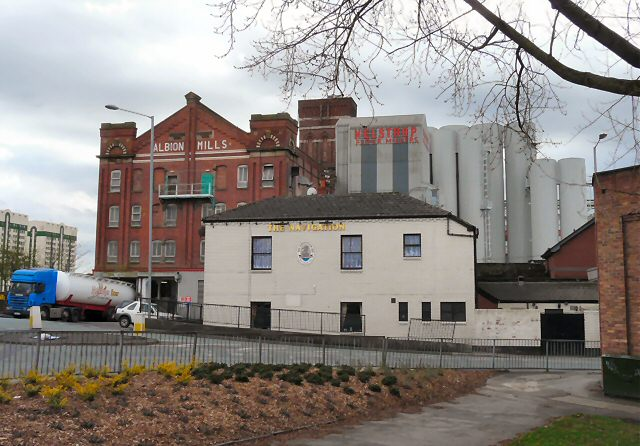
Nelstrops Albion Flour Mills in 2009

Nelstrops Albion Flour Mills, also known as Nelstrop Albion Corn Mill, Nelstrop's Flour Mill or Albion Mills, is a flour mill in the Heaton Norris suburb of Stockport, Greater Manchester, England. It is at the top of Lancashire Hill, on the roundabout next to the Navigation Inn. Nelstrops, the company which operates the mills, is one of the leading producers of flour in the United Kingdom.

== History ==
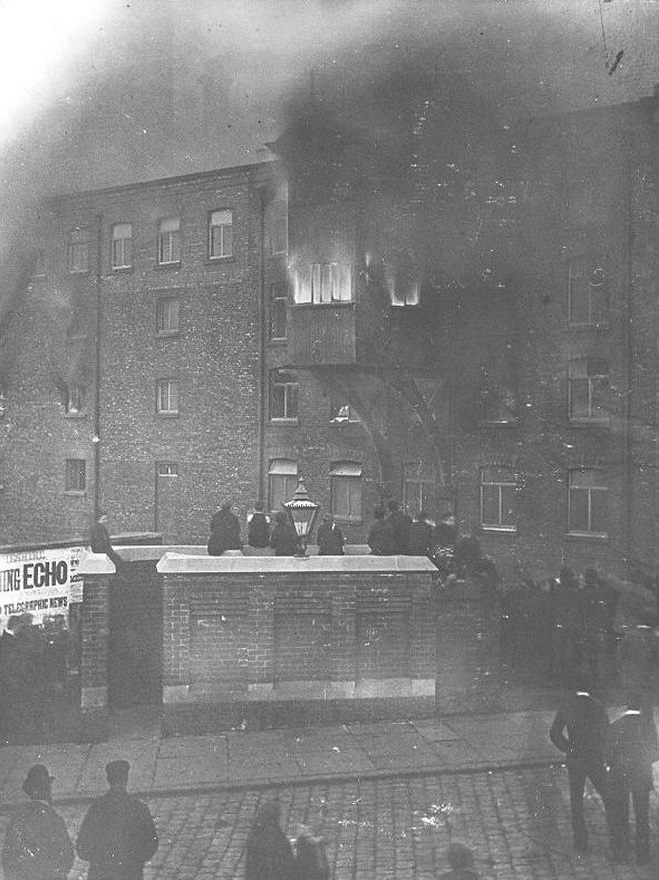
The Albion Mill fire in 1893

The first mill on the site was built in 1820 by miller and political figure William Nelstrop. It ran on steam power, using water from the Ashton Canal. A major fire on 5 April 1893 gutted the building, which was rebuilt the following year.

== Production ==
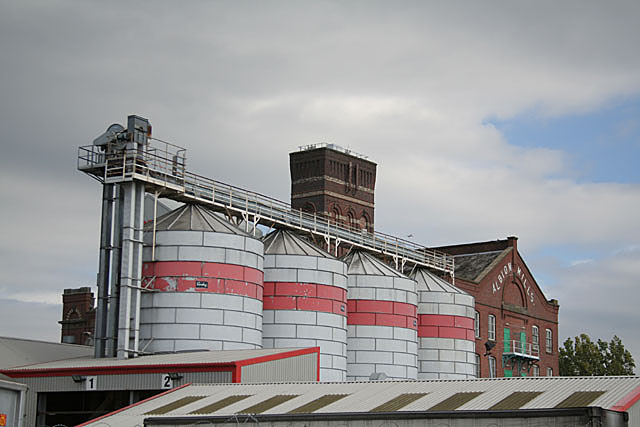
Albion Flour Mills in 2007

The mill uses wheat from East Anglia, and imports Manitoba wheat from Canada and spring wheat from the US, which is brought by ship to Seaforth Dock to the north of Liverpool and then brought to Stockport in 20 tonne bulk wheat lorries, typically 1,600 tonnes a week. The flour produced at the mill is typically sold to local bakers and supermarkets in England, as well as being exported to Nigeria, Egypt and Jordan.
