= Cinderford Canal =

Private canal in Gloucestershire, England

Coordinates: 51.832°N 2.506°W

The Cinderford Canal was a private canal, opened in about 1797, in Gloucestershire, England, which was used to provide coke and water to Cinderford Ironworks.

== History ==
The canal ran 1 1/4 miles from the dam pool at Broadmoor to Cinderford Ironworks. It was approximately 15 feet wide, with no locks, and was used by boats transporting coke to the furnace, the first in the Forest of Dean to use coke for iron-smelting. The canal also served a water wheel providing the furnace blast. Iron ore was brought in by pack-mule from local mines. The furnace was erected in 1795 but was not a success and ceased production around 1807.

Cinderford Ironworks re-opened in 1829, by which time the Bullo Pill Railway had been opened with a line running past the works to provide coke and ore and to take away the finished iron. Production continued intermittently until final closure in 1894.

== Route ==
The canal started at the dam pool at Broadmoor (SO647146), where the Cinderford Brook had been dammed in the seventeenth century to provide water to an iron furnace in Soudley, and ran parallel to the brook south to the ironworks in the valley west of Cinderford (SO652135). The route is now followed by the Valley Road, lined with light industrial enterprises, and little if anything remains of the canal.

== See also ==
- Canals of Great Britain
- History of the British canal system
