= Albion Mills Retail Park =

Shopping centre in Wakefield, West Yorkshire, England

Coordinates: 53°40′48″N 1°30′22″W

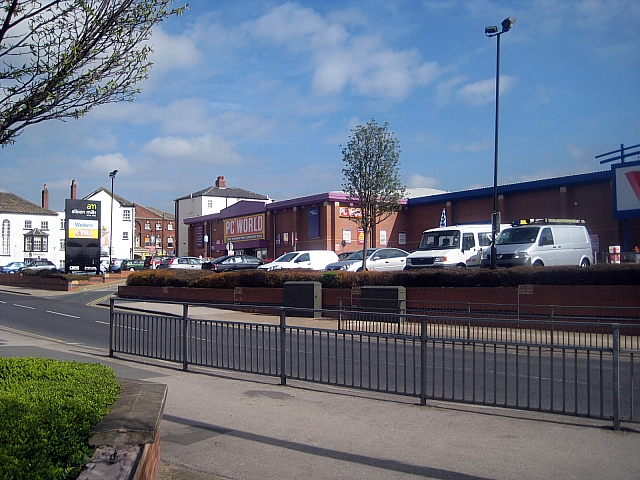
Albion Mills Retail Park

Albion Mills Retail Park is a retail park in central Wakefield, West Yorkshire, England. The park, which contains a branch of PC World, was built in 2000. It was acquired by CB Richard Ellis Realty Trust in July 2008 at a cost of £10.5 million (US$20,805,750). The shopping complex covers an area of 55,294 square feet.
