= Islington Branch Canal =

Canal in Manchester, England

Coordinates: 53°28′51″N 2°13′21″W

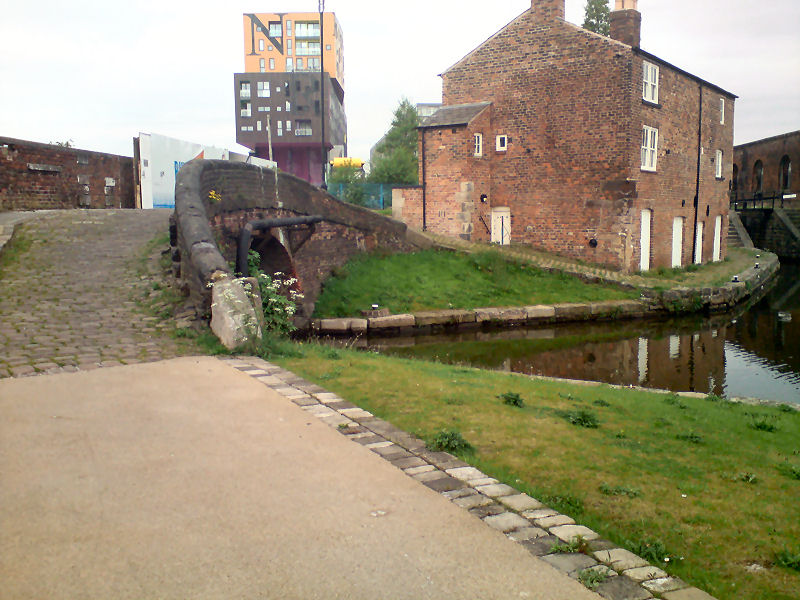
- The towpath bridge over the entrance to the Branch
- Interactive map of Islington Branch Canal

Specifications
- Status: part extant
- Navigation authority: Canal & River Trust

History
- Original owner: Ashton Canal Company

Geography
- Branch of: Ashton Canal

The Islington Branch Canal was a short canal branch at Ancoats in north-west England, which joined the main line of the Ashton Canal between locks 1 and 2.

== History ==
Although it was only 1,034 yards (945 m) long it was, in its prime, an important industrial branch and it had its own short arm leading to private wharfs. It was lock free and throughout its working life it was extensively used. It had coal, sand and salt wharfs, a scrap iron wharf and various works along its banks. An interesting works was Molineux, Webb, & Company's Glass Works situated at the head of the branch where flint glass products were made.

In 1801, Samuel Oldknow, then the chairman of the Peak Forest Canal Company, offered an Edward Stelfox £50 towards the cost of building two lime kilns on the banks of the Ashton Canal on the condition that he burned limestone brought along the Peak Forest Canal. The site of these kilns is unknown but it is suspected that they were somewhere on this branch near Limekiln Lane.

From the junction with the Ashton Canal, the branch ran to the north-west, until it passed under Mill Street. There was a sharp turn immediately beyond the bridge, and it continued in a north-easterly direction. It remained in use until the 1950s but by this time it was slowly becoming derelict. However, part of it remained open and British Waterways now has a yard there.

== Industry ==
In 1851, there were coal wharves equipped with weighing machines on both sides of the section from the Ashton Canal to Mill Street bridge, with an undeveloped area on the east bank nearest to the junction. This clear area had become the Albion Spindle Works by 1891, but had been subdivided and was occupied by a toy balloon works and a chain works in 1922. The chain works had gone by 1950, and the wharf to the east of the section had become an engineering works. A paint works occupied most of the west side wharves. The engineering works had expanded to include the site of the chain works by the 1960s, when its chief activity was metal stamping, and it remained so in 1969.

To the north of the bridge, the 1851 map shows that the west bank contained Wharf Street Cotton Mill and four coal wharves, each with a weighing machine. On the east bank, there was a coal wharf with weighing machine, a fire brick yard, another coal wharf, most of which bordered onto another arm which turned back and ended close to Mill Street, and a third coal wharf on the side arm. By 1891, the area between Mill Street bridge and the side arm had been redeveloped and was occupied by a wire works, which included a small tramway, and the arm had been filled in. Between then and 1951, the maps do not indicate what was located there, but by 1951 there was an engineering works and a clothing factory. The engineering works was making lift equipment in 1953.

Beyond the arm, the west bank contained Canal Street Dye Works and a dockyard with a dry dock in 1851. The end of the basin was quite large, and the Manchester Flint Glass Works was located beyond it. The eastern side of the basin is marked as a brick field, where clay would have been extracted. By 1891, the brick field had become a Bedstead and Safe Works, with an electric engineering works and St Jude's Church occupying the east side of the plot. The glass works had expanded to cover the former docks, and the basin had been reduced to a narrow finger. By 1951, the site to the north of the side arm was occupied by a shirt factory, the Corporation Cleansing Department's garage and an engineering works, where cylinder grinding and welding were carried out by 1953. The whole area north of Mill Street bridge had been redeveloped by the time the 1972/1981 map was published.

== See also ==
- Canals of Great Britain
- History of the British canal system
