= Stockport Branch Canal =

Former canal in Manchester, England

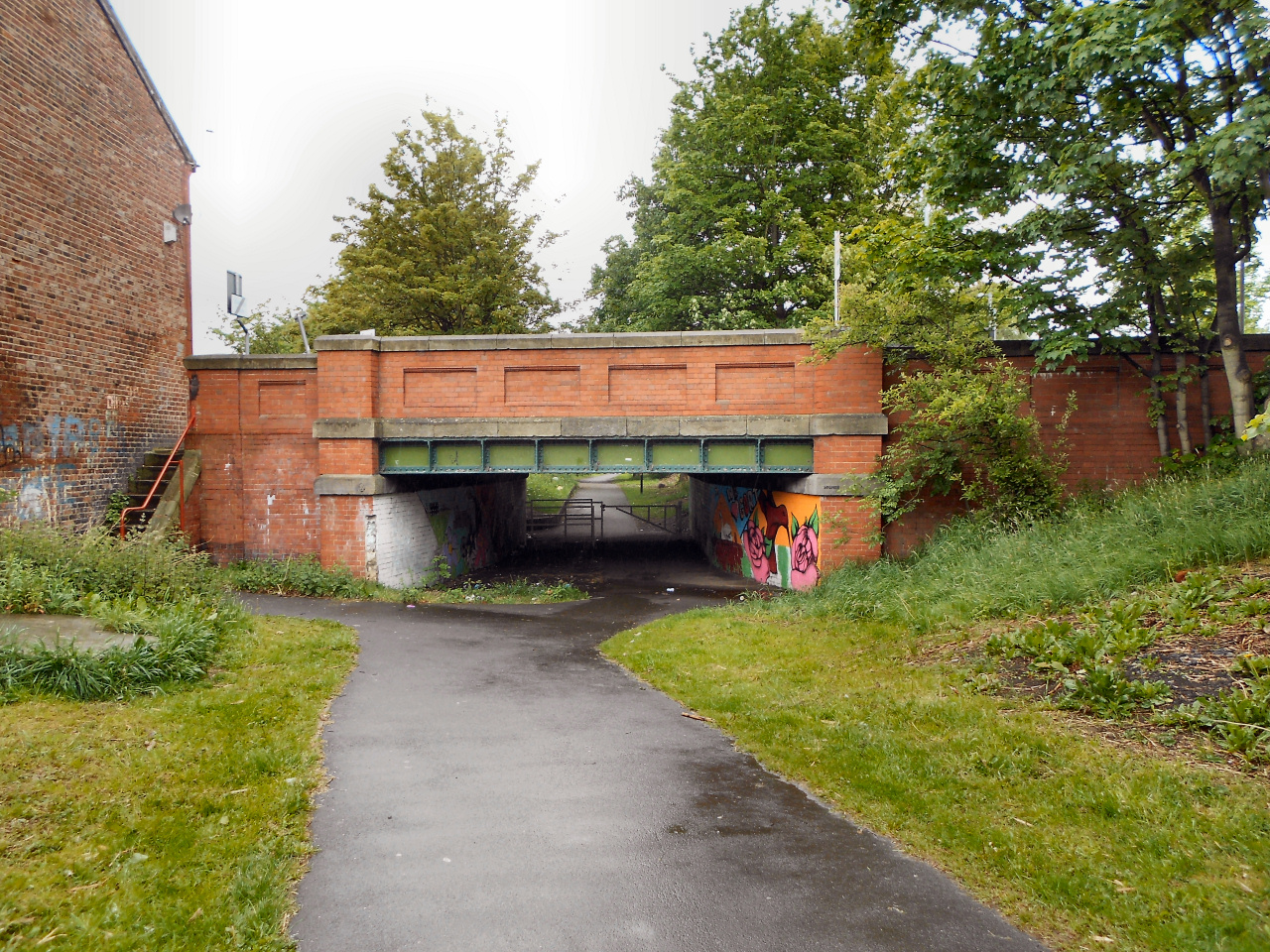
- Many of the canal's structures have survived, including this bridge at Abbey Hey Lane
- Interactive map of Stockport Branch Canal

Specifications
- Status: two fifths a footpath

History
- Original owner: Ashton Canal Company
- Date of act: 1793
- Date of first use: 1797
- Date closed: 1962

Geography
- Start point: Clayton
- End point: Stockport
- Connects to: Ashton Canal

The Stockport Branch Canal was a 5-mile (8 km) branch of the Ashton Canal from Clayton to Stockport, England.

== Route ==
The canal left the main line of the Ashton Canal at Stockport Junction (otherwise Clayton Junction), between locks 10 and 11 at Clayton, and terminated at Stockport Basin, just beyond the top of Lancashire Hill. It was just less than five miles long (7.87 km) and was lock free.

It went through Gorton, Abbey Hey and Reddish and opened for trade in 1797.

At Reddish, it was intended that a further branch (the Beat Bank Branch Canal) would be built, but only an isolated section was completed, and it never connected with the Stockport Branch.

== Features ==
The canal was for the most part urban, being heavily industrialised along most of its length. Between Clayton and Gorton there was a heavy concentration of engineering factories and ironworks as well as the Canal Company’s Depot at Gorton. Beyond Gorton, all the way through Reddish, cotton mills predominated.

== Working life ==
Manchester and Stockport Canal Act 1793
- Act of Parliament
- Parliament of Great Britain
- Long title: An Act to enable the Company of Proprietors of the Canal Navigation from Manchester to or near Ashton-under-Lyne and Oldham, to extend the said Canal from a Place called Clayton Demesne, in the Township of Droylsden, in the Parish of Manchester aforesaid, to a Place in the Turnpike Road in Heaton Norris, leading between Manchester and Stockport, opposite to the House known by the Sign of the Three Boars Heads, and from or nearly from a Place called Taylor's Barn, in the Township of Reddish, to Denton at a Place called Beat Bank, adjoining the Turnpike Road leading between Stockport and Ashton-under-Lyne, and also from the intended Aqueduct Bridge at or near a Place called Waterhouses, in the Parish of Ashton-under-Lyne aforesaid, to a Place called Stake Leach at Hollinwood, in the Township of Oldham aforesaid.
- Citation: 33 Geo. 3. c. 21
- Territorial extent: Great Britain

Dates
- Royal assent: 28 March 1793
- Commencement: 13 December 1792 (Note: Start of session.)
Other legislation
Amended by	Ashton Canal Act 1798; Ashton Canal Act 1800; Ashton Canal Act 1805; Manchester, Sheffield and Lincolnshire Railway Act 1848

Status: Amended

Text of statute as originally enacted

The main line of the Ashton Canal had been authorised by an act of Parliament, the Manchester and Oldham Canal Act 1792 (32 Geo. 3. c. 84), in June 1792, and in March 1793 the Proprietors obtained a second act, the Manchester and Stockport Canal Act 1793 (33 Geo. 3. c. 21), which authorised a branch to Stockport, a branch which would leave the Stockport branch at Reddish and run along the Tame Valley to Beat Bank to serve some coal mines at Haughton Green, and a separate branch to Hollinwood. The act authorised the Proprietors to raise an additional £30,000, with which to fund all three branches. Although the company advertised for an engineer, they did not find one, and their agent James Meadows probably oversaw the construction. The Hollinwood branch was finished first, in late 1796, but the Stockport branch opened soon afterwards, in January 1797.

With good supplies of coal from the mines at Werneth which the Hollinwood branch served, and difficulties in building the Beat Bank branch due to it being on a clay slope, the company decided to abandon further work on the Beat Bank branch, and notified William Hulton, the owner of the collieries at Denton, that they could not afford to continue. An act of Parliament to formally abandon it was sought, and although opposed by Hulton, it was obtained as the Ashton Canal Act 1798 (38 Geo. 3. c. xxxii). In the same year, the canal company built warehouses at Stockport, and wharves were allocated there to assist the Werneth Colliery to sell its coal, and thus generate more traffic on the canal.

With the coming of the railways, traffic fell, and dividends had dropped to 6 per cent by 1842. The Manchester, Sheffield and Lincolnshire Railway offered to buy the canal for an annual payment of £12,364, which would give the shareholders a 7 per cent return, and with a further payment of £540 per year to fund interest payments on debts, the canal company accepted gratefully in 1846. The takeover was formalised by an act of Parliament in 1848, which required the railway company to maintain the canal in good order. This they did for many years, running their own boats for the carriage of goods until 1892. The canal company was wound up in 1883, and the shareholders were given shares in the railway company.

The canal was principally used to carry general cargo, such as supplying raw cotton to the mills and returning with manufactured goods. It also carried coal for the mills and the townsfolk who lived in the neighbourhood. Another important cargo was the supply of grain to William Nelstrop & Company's Albion Corn Mill at Stockport Basin.

In its early days there was passenger carrying on the Ashton Canal and one of the routes was between Manchester and Stockport.

== Decline and closure ==
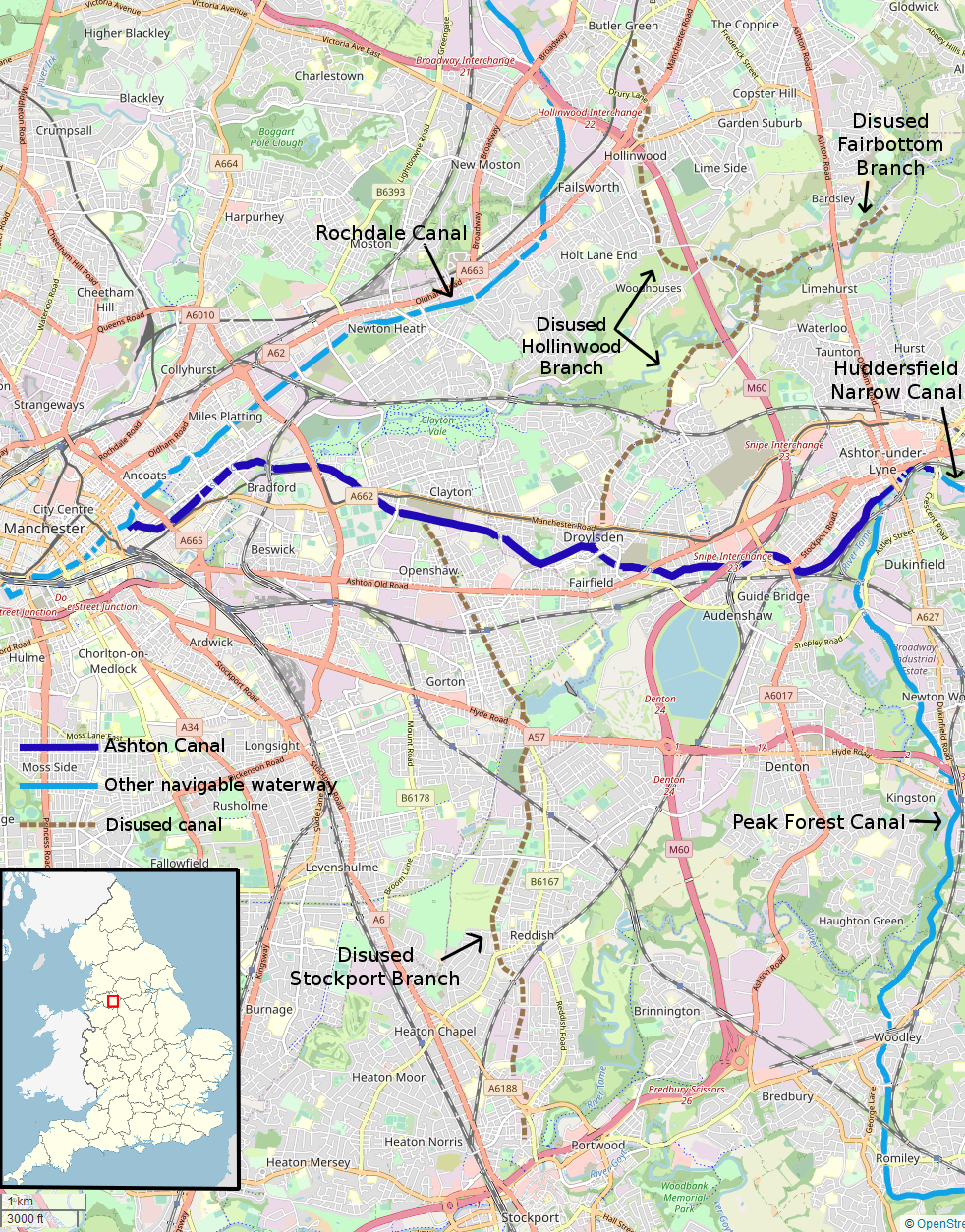
Map of Ashton Canal and its branches

The canal began to decline as a result of competition from railways and roads, and was described as derelict as early as 1922.

Commercial carrying ceased in the 1930s but it lingered on into the 1950s as a barely navigable waterway. At one stage in the 1950s it was dredged but this improvement did not attract any traffic. Stockport Basin was the first section to be filled in but it was not until the British Transport Commission Act 1962 (10 & 11 Eliz. 2. c. xlii) was passed that the canal was officially abandoned by the British Transport Commission, who had been responsible for it since 1948. It took many years to fill in and this was a disagreeable procedure for people living along its length.

== Restoration movement ==
Much of the line of the former canal remains intact and there were suggestions that if could be re-opened as an amenity canal in the early 2000s; these plans had the support of local authorities. A British Waterways report indicated that reopening the canal was technically feasible.

The Manchester and Stockport Canal Society was formed in 2004, and have worked to improve the condition of the remains, as well as bringing them to public attention. This has included the erection of nine green plaques on significant structures along the route, and regular working parties to clean up the footpath which follows the original line of the canal. While the ultimate aim of the Society is to see the restoration of the canal for navigation, they recognise that this may take a long time, and so are concentrating on smaller, achievable projects.

== Points of interest ==
Point	Coordinates (Links to map resources)	OS Grid Ref	Notes
Stockport Junction	53.4804°N 2.1788°W	SJ882982	Jn with Ashton Canal
Gorton & Openshaw Stn aqueduct	53.4689°N 2.1694°W	SJ888969	
Hyde Road Stn bridge	53.4619°N 2.1623°W	SJ893961	
Reddish North Stn bridge	53.4516°N 2.1611°W	SJ893949	
Reddish South Stn bridge	53.4323°N 2.1633°W	SJ892928	Beat Bank junction
Stockport Basin	53.4182°N 2.1613°W	SJ893912	Terminus

== See also ==
- Canals of the United Kingdom
- History of the British canal system

== Bibliography ==
- Hadfield, Charles; Biddle, Gordon (1970). The Canals of North West England (Vol 2). David & Charles. ISBN 978-0-7153-4992-2.
