= Grand Contour Canal =

Proposed canal for England and Wales

The Grand Contour Canal in England and Wales was intended to enhance and upgrade the British canal system, but was never built. This canal was proposed in 1943, and again ten years later, by J. F. Pownall. Pownall observed that there was a natural 'contour' down the spine of England, around the 300 ft level that connected several of the most populated areas. He put forward the idea that this contour could be used to define the course of a large European sized canal which contained no locks except at its entry and exit points. It would also serve as a water grid capable of distributing domestic water supply around England as need arises.

The proposal would have accommodated 300-ton continental-size barges. Feeder conduit canals at the same contour level would have been used to bring water into the system from North Wales, The Pennines and the South West Peninsula.

It was also named The Three-hundred-foot Canal for its height above sea level, 310 feet (94 m). It was to be 100 feet (30 m) wide by 17 feet (5.2 m) deep, with 25 feet (7.6 m) headroom. (For comparison, this would be a CEMT Class VIb waterway, carrying ships of similar size to the Amsterdam–Rhine Canal.)

It was intended to connect the major industrial centres of London, Bristol, Southampton, Coventry, Birmingham, Nottingham, Derby, Chester, Manchester, Blackburn, Bradford, Hartlepool and Newcastle, with vertical lift locks at the nine termini, having tanks 250 feet (76 m) by 35 feet (11 m) by 14 feet (4.3 m) draught. A 6-mile (9.7 km) long tunnel was proposed between Airedale and Ribblesdale.

The scheme was intended both for transport and for a water supply grid, for water distribution is a major problem in London and South East England.

In 2012 the scheme was brought back to attention after Boris Johnson, the Mayor of London, showed his support for the scheme as a way to transport water from the higher, and wetter, areas of Wales, Scotland, and northern England to the 'breadbasket' of the south east. A maximum flow of water of some 2,000 cu ft/s (57 m^{3}/s) anywhere in either direction was visualised, sourced from the Northern Pennines 800 square miles (2,100 km^{2}), the Dee, the Severn and the Wye 1,040 square miles (2,700 km^{2}) and Exmoor 160 square miles (410 km^{2}).

== Earlier schemes ==
The Elan Valley Reservoirs scheme (1892) in mid-Wales (capacity 99,000 megalitres) which includes (with four others) the Craig Goch Dam provides water to Birmingham (pop. 1 million), but was designed looking forward 63 years.

Lake Vyrnwy was created by the construction of the first large masonry dam in Britain, between 1881 and 1888, to provide an urgently needed new water supply for the growing city of Liverpool, and the water from the Welsh mountains was to be carried by an aqueduct to the city.

The Longdendale Reservoir, in the Pennines 18 miles (29 km) east of Manchester, was one of the first of its kind in the country when it was opened in 1851. By 1875 it was obvious that growing population of the city would need even more water, so plans were drawn up to construct a reservoir in the Lake District. Thirlmere (1894) now provides water for Manchester 100 miles (160 km) away.

== See also ==
- Canals of Great Britain
- List of canals of the United Kingdom – list also covers abandoned and proposed canals
