= Ashton Canal =

Canal in Greater Manchester, England

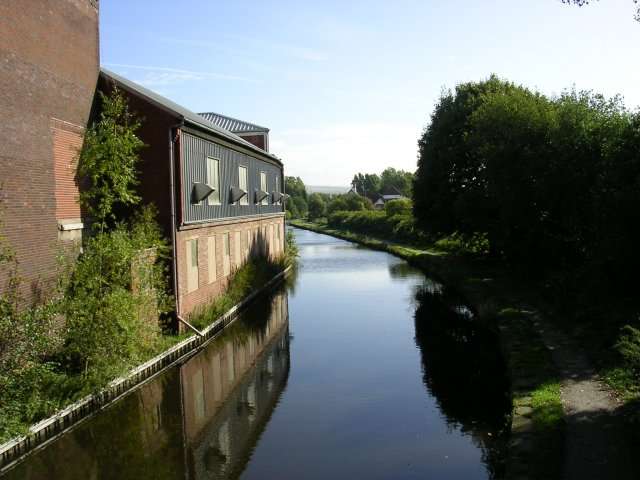
- The Ashton Canal at Droylsden
- Interactive map of Ashton Canal

Specifications
- Length: 6 miles (9.7 km)
- Maximum boat length: 70 ft 0 in (21.34 m)
- Maximum boat beam: 7 ft 0 in (2.13 m)
- Locks: 18
- Status: Navigable
- Navigation authority: Canal & River Trust

History
- Principal engineer: Benjamin Outram
- Date of act: 1792
- Date of first use: 1796
- Date completed: 1797
- Date closed: 1961
- Date restored: 1974

Geography
- Start point: Ashton-under-Lyne
- End point: Ducie St Jn, Manchester
- Branches: Hollinwood Branch Canal, Stockport Branch Canal, Islington Branch Canal
- Connects to: Huddersfield Narrow Canal, Peak Forest Canal, Rochdale Canal

The Ashton Canal is a canal in Greater Manchester, England, linking Manchester with Ashton-under-Lyne in Tameside.

== Route ==
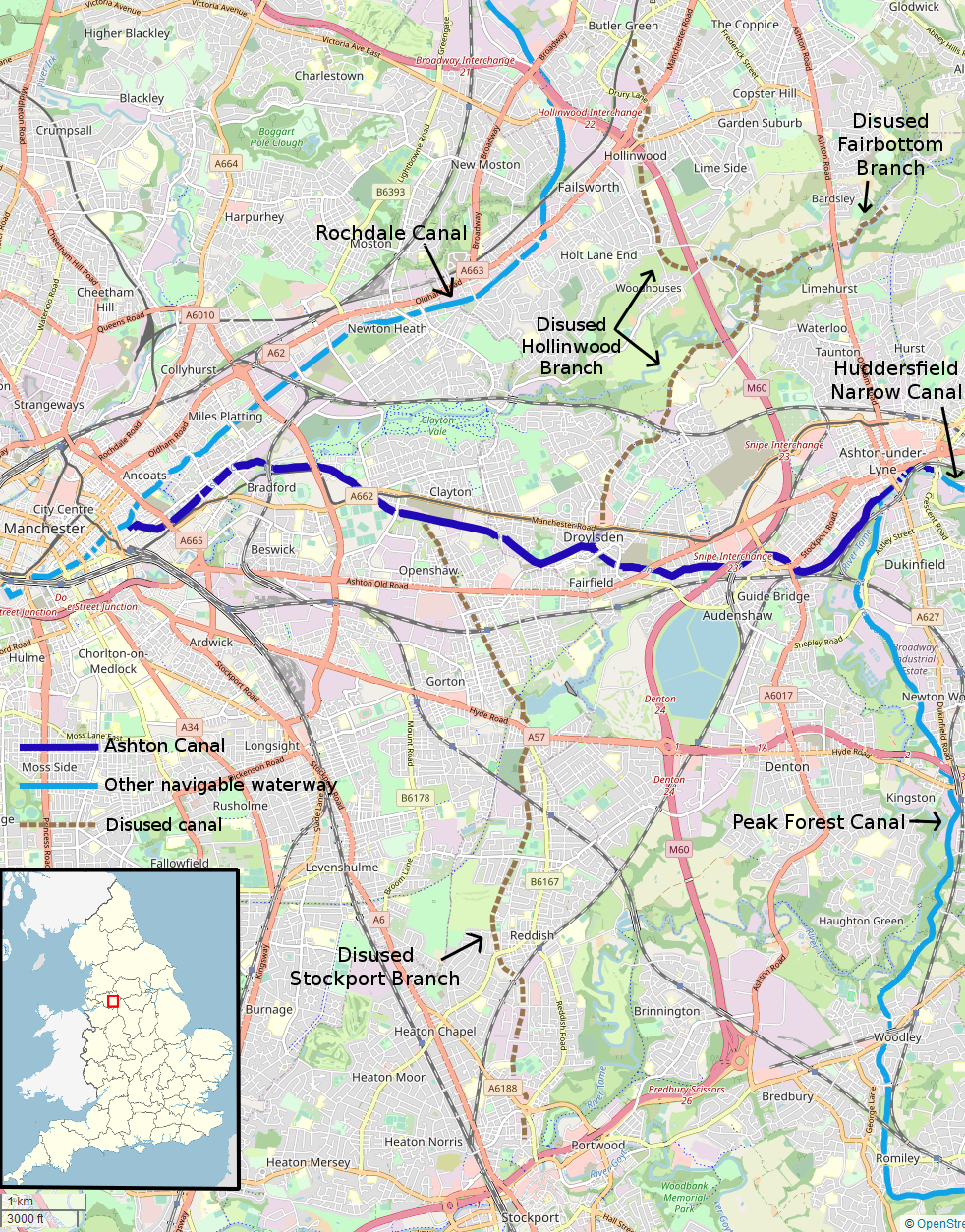
Map of Ashton Canal and its branches

The Ashton leaves the Rochdale Canal at Ducie St. Junction in central Manchester, and climbs for 6 miles (9.7 km) through 18 locks, passing through Ancoats, Holt Town, Bradford, Clayton, Openshaw, Droylsden, Fairfield and Audenshaw to make a head-on junction with the Huddersfield Narrow Canal (formerly the Huddersfield Canal) at Whitelands Basin in the centre of Ashton-under-Lyne. At Bradford, the canal passes very close to the City of Manchester Stadium (currently known as the Etihad Stadium for sponsorship reasons), which was originally built to host the 2002 Commonwealth Games.

Apart from the Rochdale and Huddersfield Narrow canals, the Ashton Canal only currently connects with one other canal. Just short of Whitelands, at Dukinfield Junction/Portland Basin a short arm crosses the river Tame on the Tame Aqueduct, and makes a head-on junction with the Peak Forest Canal.

There used to be four other important connections to branch canals: the Islington Branch Canal in Ancoats; the Stockport Branch Canal from Clayton to Stockport (Heaton Norris); the Hollinwood Branch Canal from Fairfield to Hollinwood; and the Fairbottom Branch Canal (itself a branch of the Hollinwood Branch Canal) from Waterhouses to Fairbottom. There was to have been a fifth branch, namely the Beat Bank Branch Canal (itself a branch of Stockport Branch Canal) from Reddish to Beat Bank in Denton, but this was abandoned before completion.

Many of the canal locks are now listed buildings.

== History ==
Manchester and Oldham Canal Act 1792
- Act of Parliament
- Parliament of Great Britain
- Long title: An Act for making a Navigable Canal from Manchester, to or near Ashton-under-Lyne and Oldham, in the County Palatine of Lancaster.
- Citation: 32 Geo. 3. c. 84
- Territorial extent: Great Britain

Dates
- Royal assent: 11 June 1792
- Commencement: 31 January 1792 (Note: Start of session.)
Other legislation
Amended by	Ashton Canal Act 1798; Ashton Canal Act 1800; Ashton Canal Act 1805; Manchester, Sheffield and Lincolnshire Railway Act 1848; Manchester, Sheffield and Lincolnshire Railway Act 1849; British Transport Commission Act 1961

Status: Amended

Text of statute as originally enacted

Ashton Canal Act 1798
- Act of Parliament
- Parliament of Great Britain
- Long title: An act to enable the company of proprietors of the canal navigation, from Manchester to or near Ashton under Lyne and Oldham, to finish and complete the same and the several cuts and other works authorised to be made and done by them, by the several acts passed for that purpose, and for amending the said acts, and granting to the said company further and other powers.
- Citation: 38 Geo. 3. c. xxxii
- Territorial extent: Great Britain

Dates
- Royal assent: 26 May 1798
- Commencement: 26 May 1798 (Note: The Acts of Parliament (Commencement) Act 1793.)
Other legislation
Amends	Manchester and Oldham Canal Act 1792; Manchester and Stockport Canal Act 1793
Amended by	Ashton Canal Act 1800; Ashton Canal Act 1805; Manchester, Sheffield and Lincolnshire Railway Act 1848; British Transport Commission Act 1961

Status: Amended

Text of statute as originally enacted

The canal received its act of Parliament, the Manchester and Oldham Canal Act 1792 (32 Geo. 3. c. 84) in 1792. It was built to supply coal from Oldham and Ashton under Lyne to Manchester. The first section between Ancoats Lane to Ashton-under-Lyne and Hollinwood was completed in 1796, followed by the lines to Heaton Norris and Fairbottom in 1797. Although there were plans to link it to the Rochdale Canal, it opened as an isolated waterway.

Benjamin Outram was retained to complete the final section between Ancoats Lane and the Rochdale Canal including the Piccadilly Basin. It included the unique Store Street Aqueduct, built on a 45 degree skew and believed to be the first major such structure in Britain and the oldest still in use today.

The section was completed by 1798, but the necessary extension by the Rochdale proprietors to the Bridgewater Canal was not built until 1800. Although the Huddersfield Narrow Canal was open as far as Woolroad by 1798, neither it, nor the Peak Forest Canal were complete. In fact it was another ten years before the former connected to Yorkshire and the east coast.

With little but local trade in its early years, the canal struggled financially and a dividend was not paid until 1806.

It then prospered until competition from railways, and later road transport, greatly diminished traffic, and through traffic had ended by 1945. Traffic on the branches ended in the 1930s. Following nationalisation in 1947–48, traffic did not revive, and all traffic had ceased by 1958, after which maintenance was run down. By 1961, combined with vandalism, the canal had become unnavigable, and its retention for pleasure use seemed unlikely.

The Ashton Canal was one of seven stretches of canal, formerly designated as remainder waterways, that were re-classified by the British Waterways Act 1983 (c. ii) of 8 February 1983. Under the act, a total of 82 miles (132 km) of canal were upgraded to Cruising Waterway Standard.

In October 2021, lock numbers 13 and 15 were one of 142 sites across England to receive part of a £35-million injection into the government's Culture Recovery Fund.

== Leisure use ==
Pressure from the Inland Waterways Association, combined with the formation of the Peak Forest Canal Society, led to a campaign to reopen the Ashton, with the major organised volunteer clearance of the section though Droylsden in September 1968, known as Operation Ashton. Further campaigning, and the growth of local authority support, led to its restoration, along with the adjacent lower Peak Forest Canal, and reopening on 1 April 1974.

The restoration of these two canals opened up the Cheshire Ring, an immediately (and still) popular one-week leisure cruise circling much of east Cheshire. With the opening of the Southern Pennine canals, the Ashton is now also part of the South Pennine Ring (Rochdale and Huddersfield Narrow) and the longest Pennine Ring of all (Outer Pennine Ring - Leeds & Liverpool and Huddersfield Narrow).

It used to be common to hear reports of unfortunate incidents along the Ashton, such as thefts from boats and intimidating, or at least unnerving, behaviour on the part of some local youths and children. This, for a time, caused boats to go through in convoys. Today the Ashton Canal is increasingly valued by the communities through which it passes, and although many boaters still advise others to cover the Ashton during early hours, and not in school holidays, reports of problems often turn out to be the repeated telling of old stories. However, incidents do still occur, as in August 2014 when a number of boats were attacked by hooded youths.

The locks are known for debris (shopping trolleys, wheely bins, rocks etc.) which can result in blocked lock gates.The Canal & River Trust workers clear any reported incidents. Portland Basin is a possible place for overnight mooring after ascending the Ashton locks, for those who do not wish to proceed beyond Romiley.

There are current campaigns to restore the Hollinwood Branch and Stockport Branches.

== Listed structures ==
The following structures along the canal are Grade II listed:

- Lock numbers 1–3, 6–15 & 18
- Bridges numbers 4, 5, 9 & 16
- Lock Keepers Cottages at lock numbers 2 & 7
- Towpath Bridge over junction with Islington Branch Canal
- Towpath Bridge over junction with Stockport Branch Canal
- Former Packet Boathouse adjacent to bridge number 16
- Former Tollhouse adjacent to lock number 18 (Fairfield Top Lock)
- Mill Building on south bank east of Hope Works

== Image gallery ==
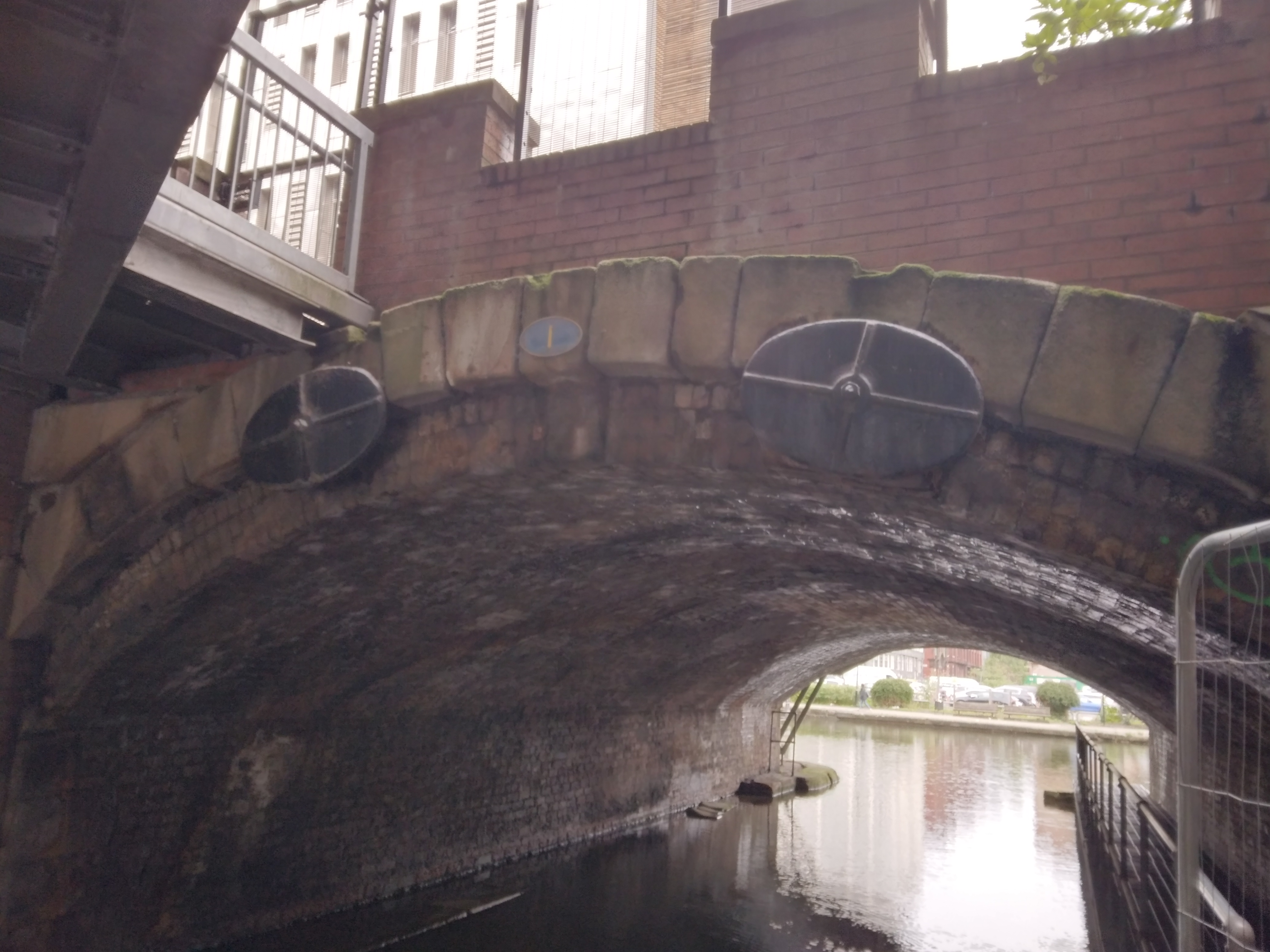
Ducie Street Junction, near Picadilly, where the Ashton Canal splits off the Rochdale Canal

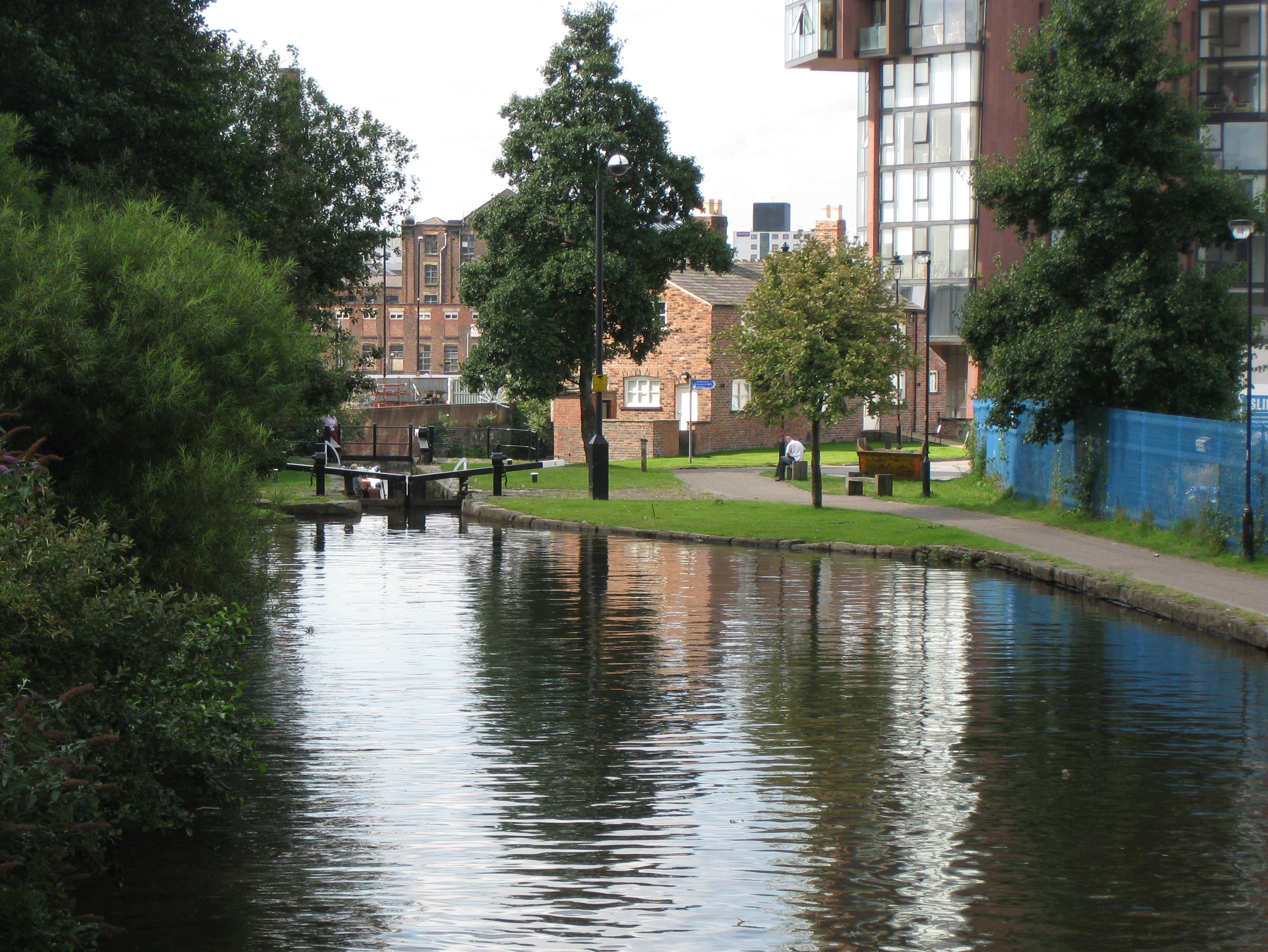
Ancoats Bottom Lock (Lock 1)

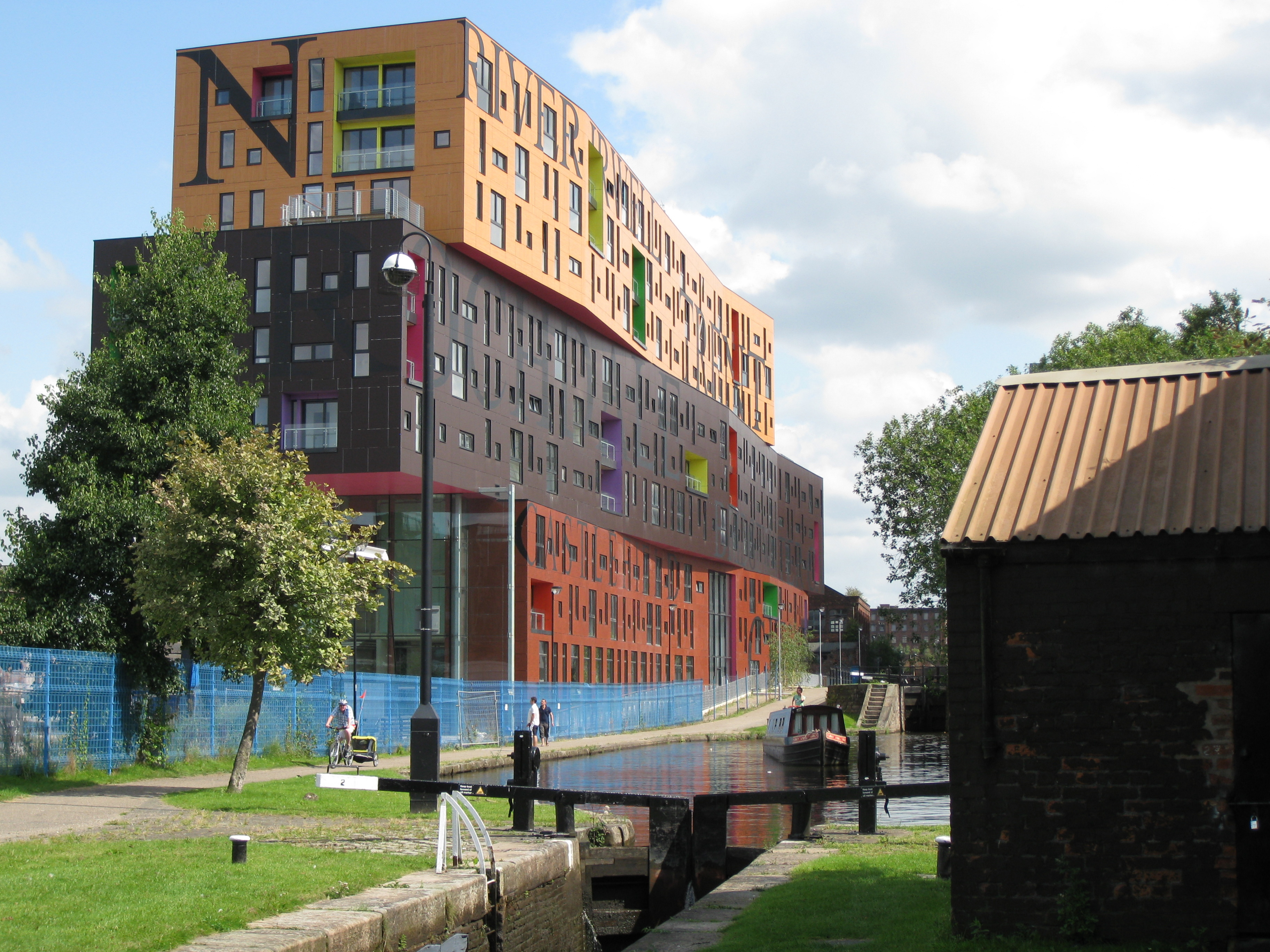
Chips, New Islington and Lock 2 on the Ashton Canal

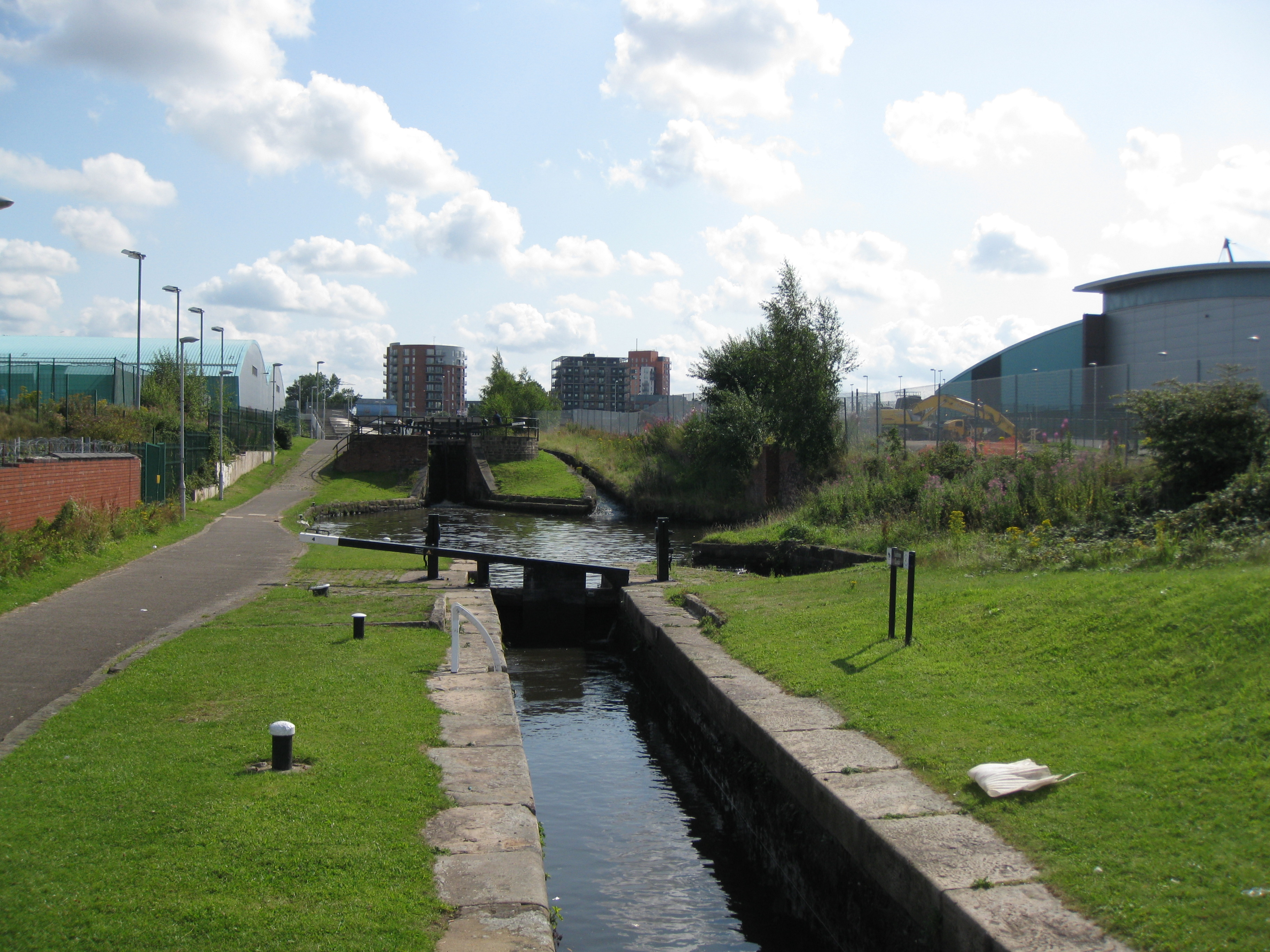
Beswick Locks (Locks 4 and 5)

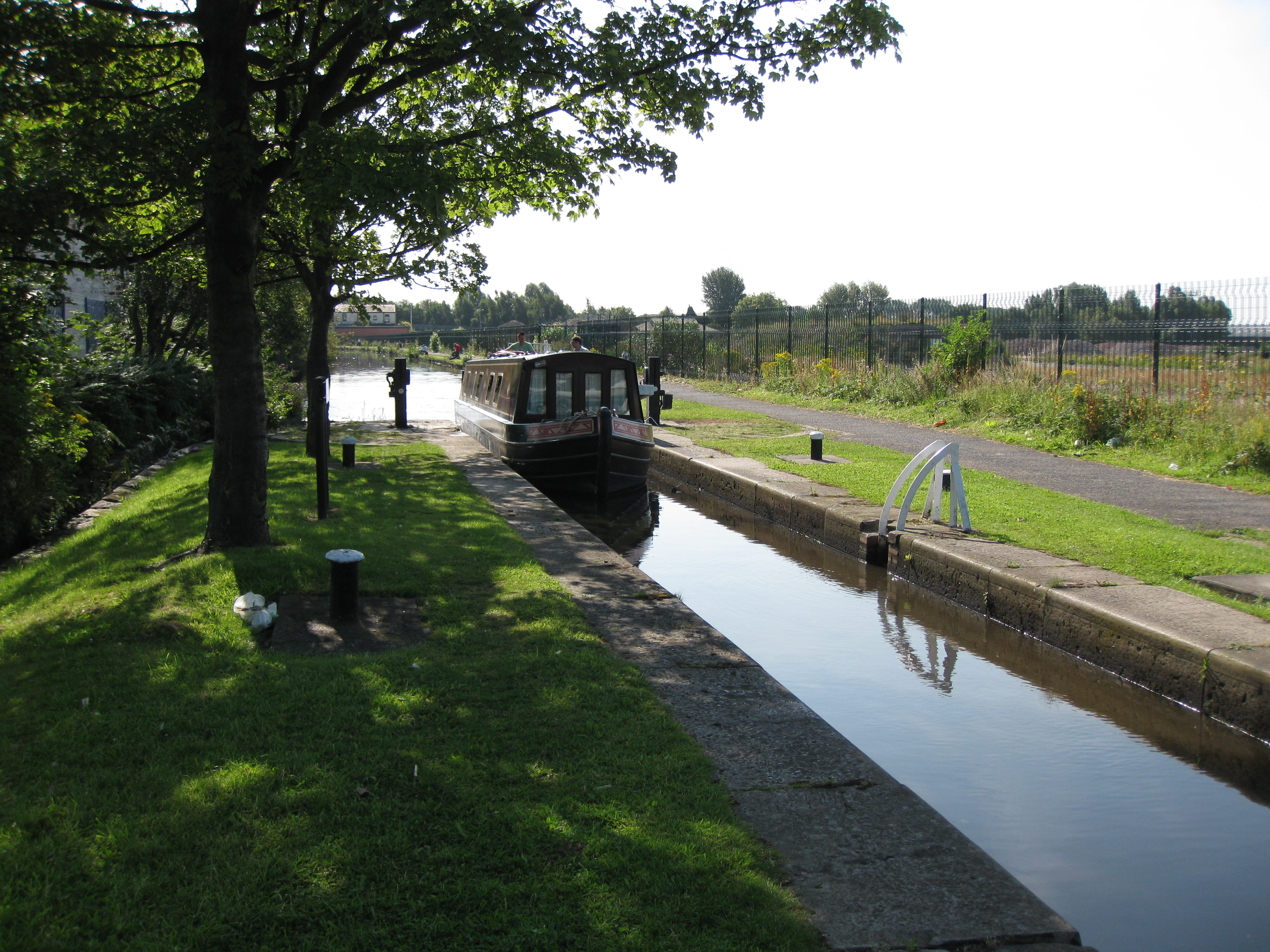
Beswick Top Lock (Lock 7)

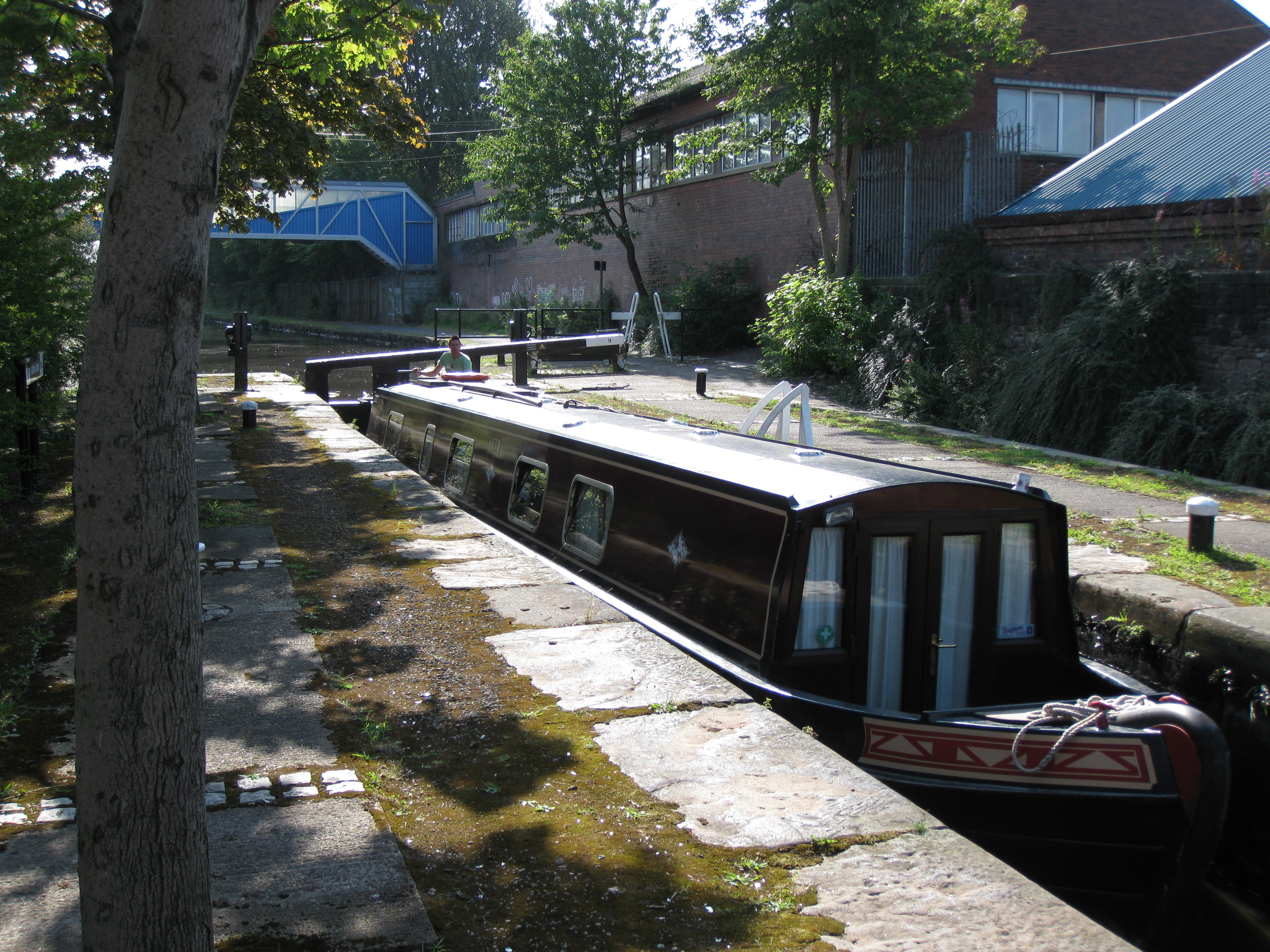
Narrowboat in Clayton Bottom Lock (Lock 8)

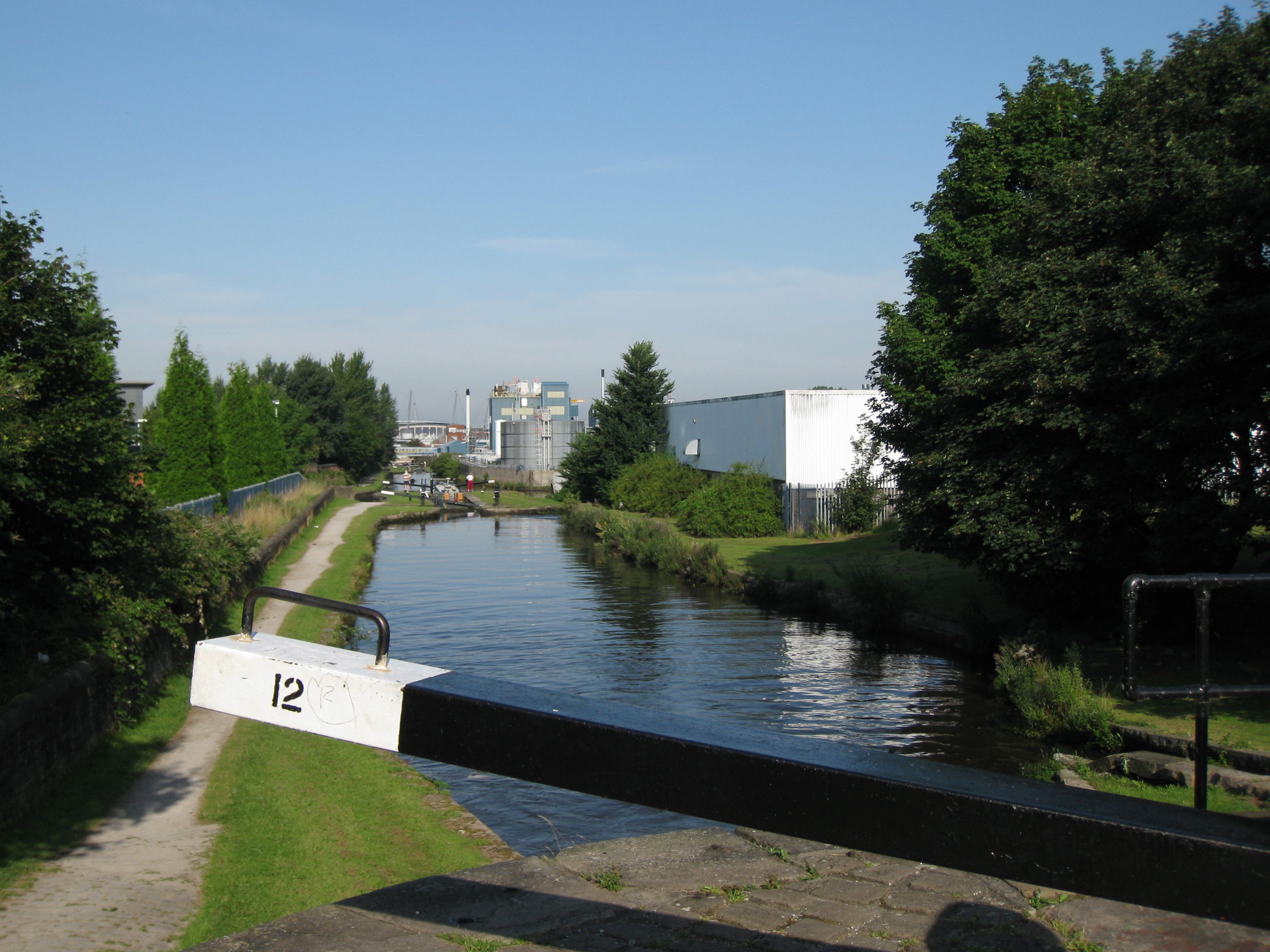
Lock 12

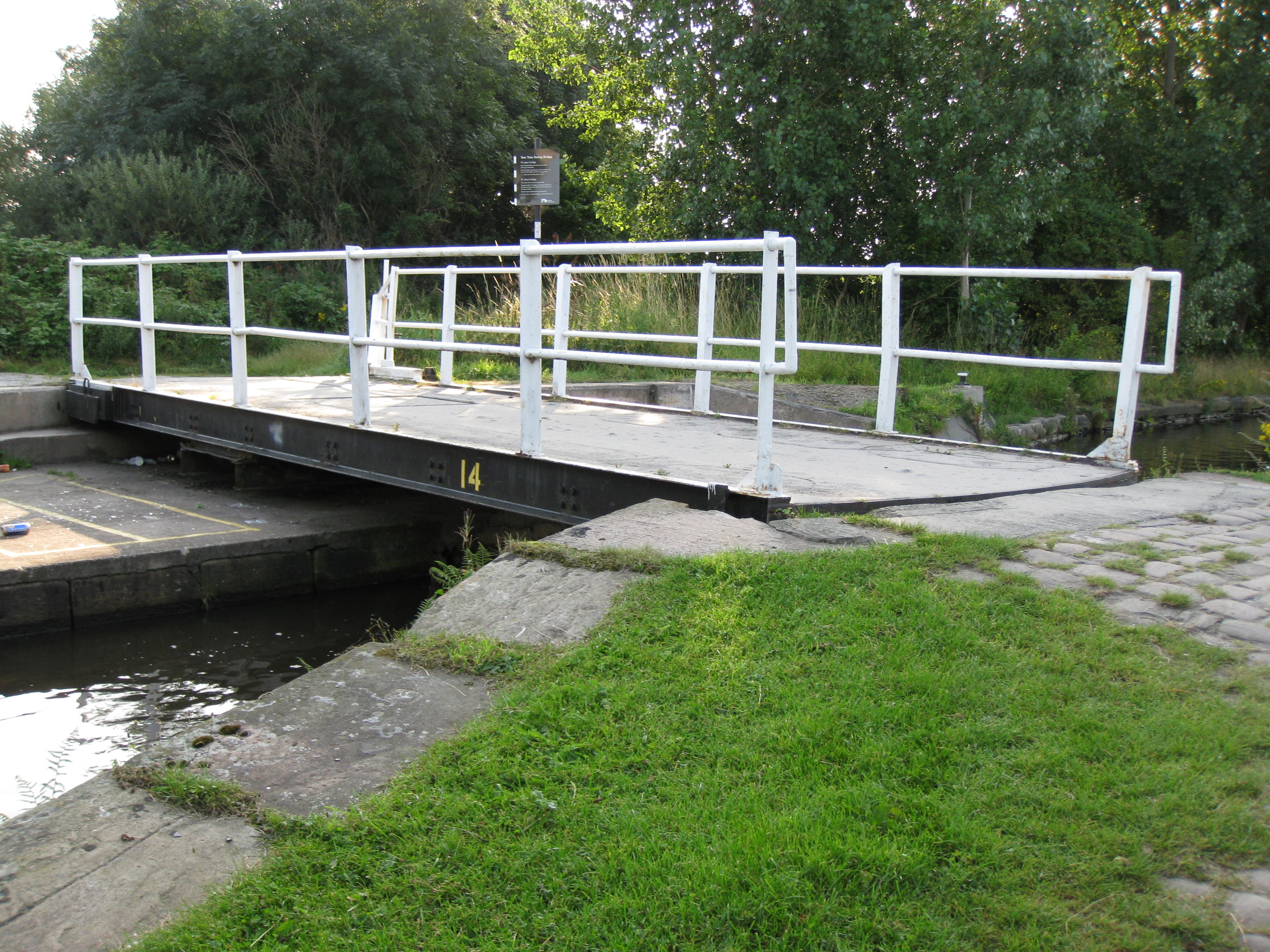
Yew Tree Swing Bridge

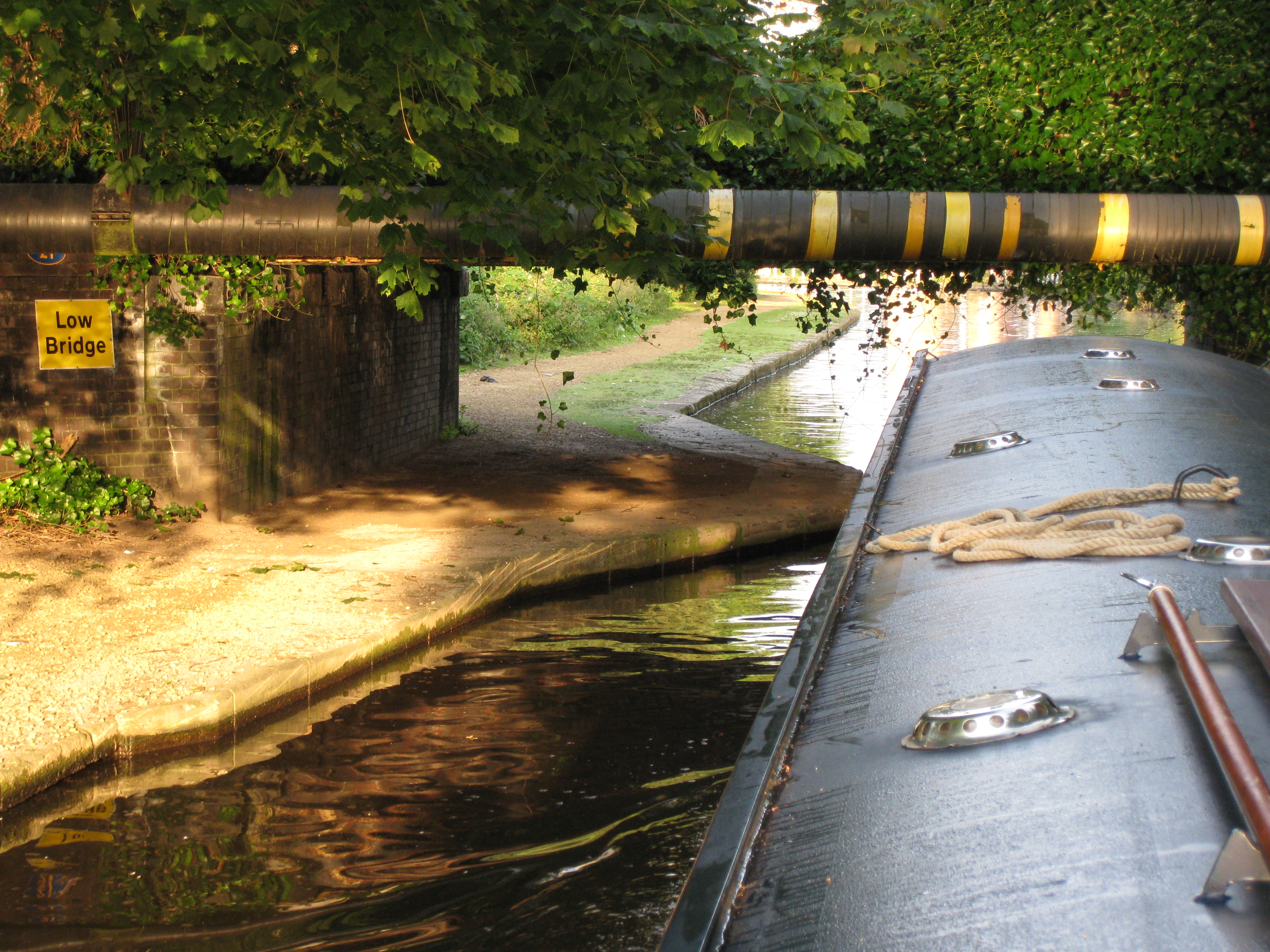
Lumb Lane Bridge (Bridge 21)

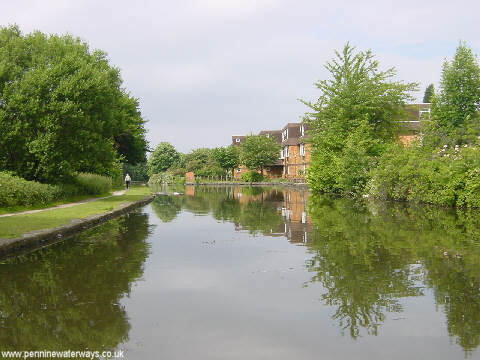
The Ashton Canal at Audenshaw

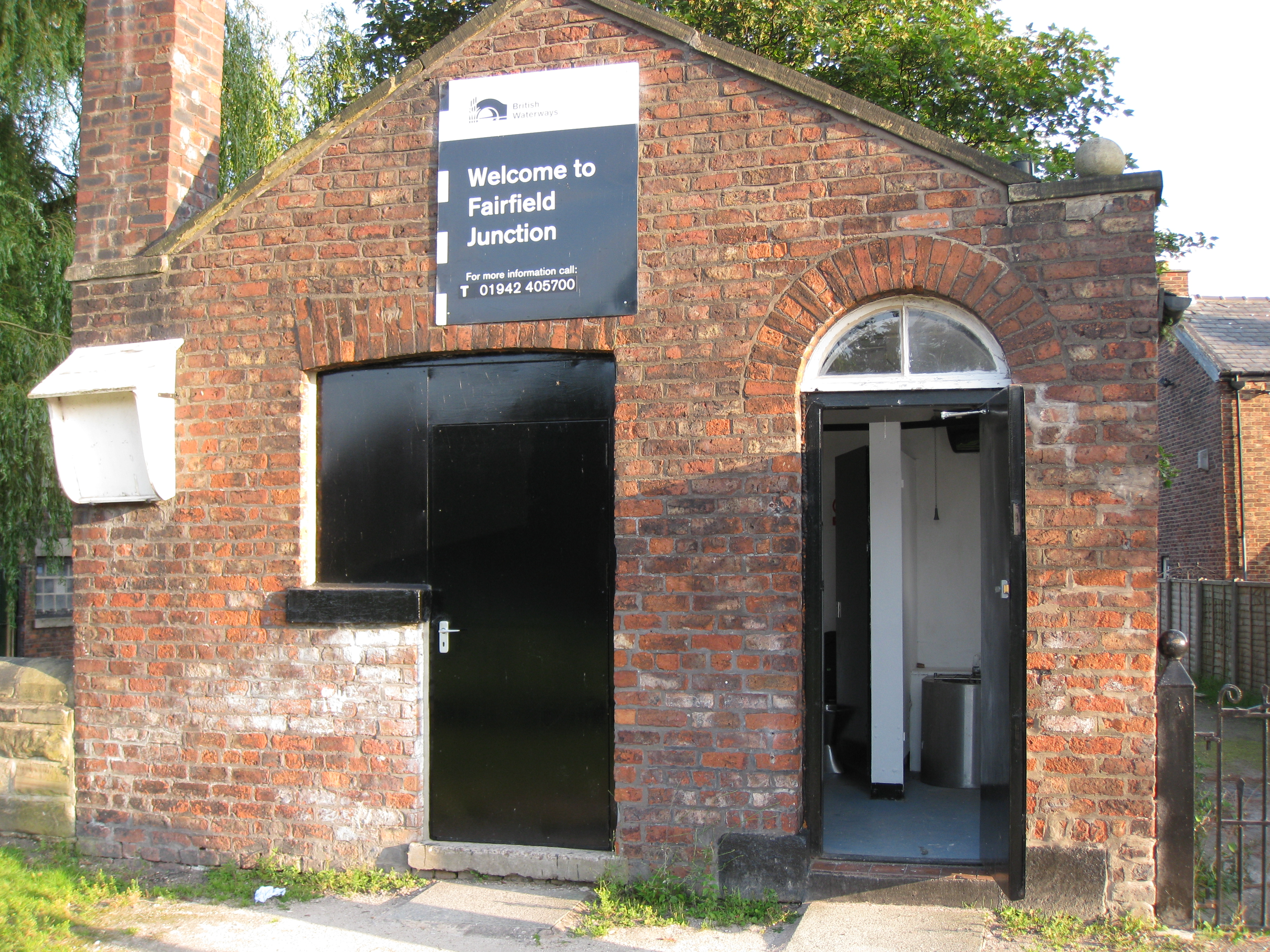
Canal & River Trust services at Fairfield Junction

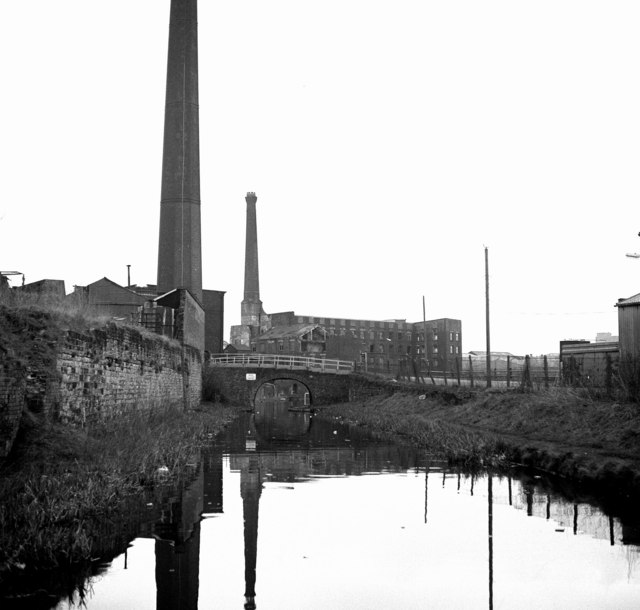
Ashton Canal at Ashton-under-Lyne in 1981

== Points of interest ==
Point	Coordinates (Links to map resources)	OS Grid Ref	Notes
Dukinfield Junction	53.4824°N 2.0996°W	SJ934984	Huddersfield Narrow Canal & Peak Forest Canal
Fairfield Lock 18	53.4777°N 2.1503°W	SJ901978	Stub of Hollinwood Branch Canal
Top of Clayton Locks (No.16)	53.4784°N 2.1650°W	SJ891979	Flight of 9 locks
Jn with derelict Stockport Branch	53.4805°N 2.1780°W	SJ882982	Clayton lock No.11
Bottom of Clayton Locks (No.8)	53.4827°N 2.1879°W	SJ876984	
Top of Beswick Locks (No.7)	53.4858°N 2.1974°W	SJ869988	Flight of 4 locks
Bottom of Beswick Locks (No.4)	53.4854°N 2.2045°W	SJ865987	
Top of Ancoats Locks (No.3)	53.4814°N 2.2203°W	SJ854983	Flight of 3 locks
Ducie Street Junction	53.4799°N 2.2303°W	SJ848981	Jn with Rochdale Canal

== See also ==
- Canals of the United Kingdom
- History of the British canal system

== Bibliography ==
- Cumberlidge, Jane (2009). Inland Waterways of Great Britain (8th Ed.). Imray Laurie Norie and Wilson. ISBN 978-1-84623-010-3.
- Dean, Richard (2001). Historical Map 3:Canals of Manchester. M & M Baldwin. ISBN 0-947712-43-7.
- Edwards, Lewis A. (1985). Inland Waterways of Great Britain (6th ed.). Imray Laurie Norie and Wilson. ISBN 0-85288-081-2.
- Keaveney, E.; Brown, D. L. (1974). The Ashton Canal: A History Of The Manchester To Ashton-under-Lyne Canal.
- Schofield, Reginald B. (2000). Benjamin Outram. Cardiff: Merton Priory Press. ISBN 978-1-898937-42-5.
