= Hollinwood Branch Canal =

Canal in Greater Manchester, England

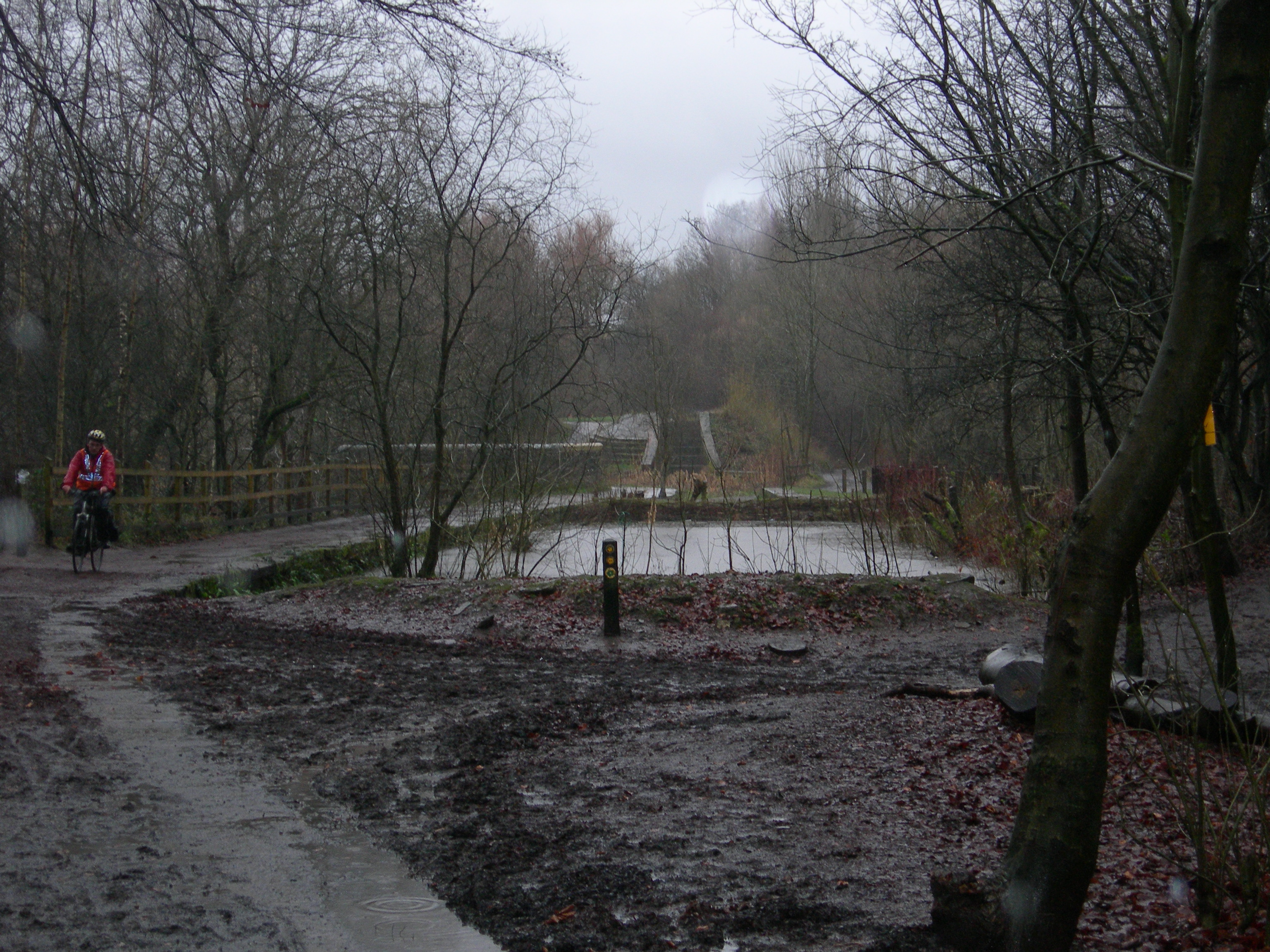
- Aqueduct over the River Medlock and remains of the first lock
- Interactive map of Hollinwood Branch Canal

Specifications
- Maximum boat length: 70 ft 0 in (21.34 m)
- Maximum boat beam: 7 ft 0 in (2.13 m)
- Locks: 8
- Status: Restoration proposed

History
- Original owner: Ashton Canal Company
- Date of act: 1792
- Date closed: 1897

Geography
- Start point: Hollinwood
- End point: Droylsden
- Branch: Fairbottom Branch
- Branch of: Ashton Canal

The Hollinwood Branch Canal was a canal near Hollinwood, in Oldham, England. It left the main line of the Ashton Canal at Fairfield Junction immediately above lock 18. It was just over 4.5 miles (7.2 km) long and went through Droylsden and Waterhouses to terminate at Hollinwood Basin (Hollinwood Top Wharf). It rose through four locks at Waterhouses (19–22) and another four at Hollinwood (23–26). Immediately above lock 22 at Waterhouses was Fairbottom Junction where the Fairbottom Branch Canal started. Beyond Hollinwood Basin there was a lock free private branch, known as the Werneth Branch Canal, to Old Lane Colliery, which opened in 1797. It is a biological Site of Special Scientific Interest and a Local Nature Reserve.

== History ==
The Hollinwood Branch Canal was comparatively rural in character apart from mills and factories at Droylsden. Its main purpose was to carry coal from numerous local collieries to the many mills and factories in the neighbourhood of the Ashton Canal. Passengers were also carried along its length.

This canal was extensively used until about 1928 when trade began to decline rapidly due to competition from railways and roads. However, this was not the only problem as mining subsidence was becoming serious and it unofficially closed in 1932, although parts of it remained navigable. It was not until 1955 that most of it was officially closed and the short remaining section from the main line at Fairfield Junction was officially closed under the British Transport Commission Act 1961 (9 & 10 Eliz. 2. c. xxxvi).

== Future ==
Much of the line of the former canal remained intact, and there are now plans to re-open it as an amenity canal; these plans have the support of the local authorities. However, the problems of restoring this canal are far more challenging than those of restoring the Stockport Branch Canal. Not only is it suffering from the effects of mining subsidence but also its line has been severed twice by the Manchester ring road, which would require the construction of aqueducts to cross it. Another aqueduct would also be required to replace one across a railway that was demolished some time ago. The line up to Hollinwood Basin could not be restored because buildings now obstruct it but there are plans to connect the rest of it to the Rochdale Canal by means of a short new canal from just below the site of lock 23. Such a link was originally planned in 1792, but never constructed.

The first part of the restoration has started, with a £100 million redevelopment scheme for Droylsden including housing, flats, restaurants, shops and offices, centred on a new marina which is connected to the line of the canal, and which was opened in September 2008. About 190 yards (170 m) of canal from the junction with the Ashton Canal have been refurbished, and new waterside facilities for boaters are available near lock 18. The original plans would have blocked further restoration of the canal, but were changed after representations were made by the Hollinwood Canal Society, and the canal will now pass under a building which will span the route.

== Features ==
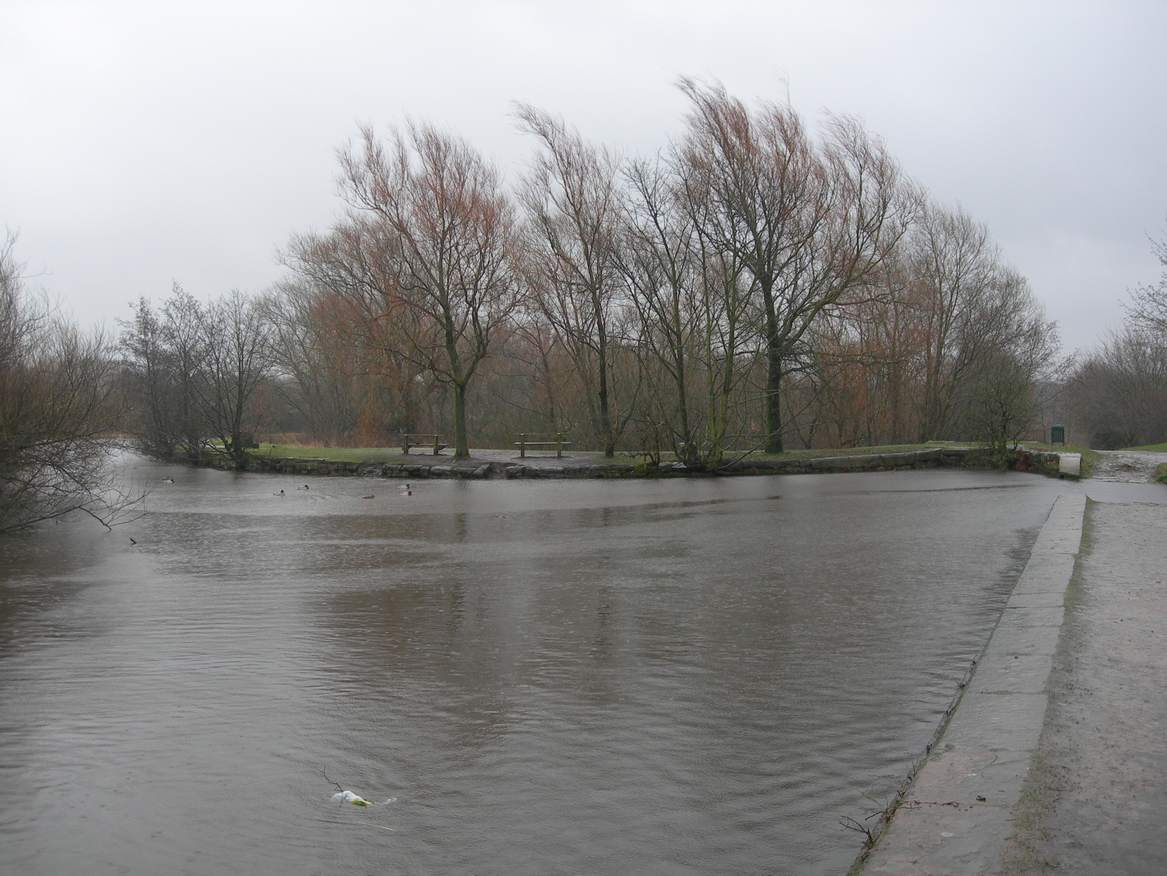
Waterhouses Junction

The Hollinwood Branch Canal at Waterhouses is unique among Britain's canals and it is now part of the Daisy Nook Country Park owned by the National Trust. In 1,320 yards (1,210 m) it included every type of canal feature, as well as some more unusual ones as well. Over this length these features were once to be found, starting and ending with road bridges over the canal:

- A road bridge (Waterhouses Bridge)
- A tunnel (Waterhouses, Boodle or Dark Tunnel). This was opened out in the 1920s.
- A single-arched stone aqueduct over the River Medlock (Waterhouses Aqueduct)
- A flight of four locks (19–22), the inner pair of which were staircase locks in that the top gates of the lower lock were also the bottom gates of the upper lock (Waterhouses Locks)
- A small brick-built hut by lock 21 that is believed to have been used for the payment of wages
- A canal junction where the Fairbottom Branch Canal started (Waterhouses Junction)
- The towpath of the Fairbottom Branch Canal crossed the Hollinwood Branch Canal on a swivel bridge located across the head of lock 22.
- An overspill weir crossed by the towpath on a low pier of stone blocks
- A lock-keeper's cottage, which doubled as an office for the collection of tolls
- A pumping engine (beam engine) used to back pump water from the canal below lock 19 to the canal above lock 22
- A wooden flume over the pump house yard used to carry the water from the pump house back to the canal
- A footbridge over the canal having a wrought-iron balustrade (Occupation Bridge)
- A cast-iron aqueduct over Crime Lane (Crime Aqueduct)
- A lake at the side of the canal that resulted from canal works at the time construction. As built, the canal severed the course of a brook and a culvert was made below the canal to accommodate this. A landslip blocked this and the waters were impounded on the offside of the canal. The new lake and canal became one and the lake was officially known as Crime Bank Reservoir but it is far better known by its later name of Crime Lake.
- A road bridge (Crime Bridge)

Mention must be made of a neighbour of the pumping engine known as ‘Fairbottom Bobs’. This was a Newcomen steam engine (more accurately a Newcomen atmospheric engine) used to pump water from a coal mine. The water was pumped along a wooden flume for a distance of about 219 yards (200 m) and then discharged into the Fairbottom Branch Canal at Fenny Fields Bridge.

In 1929 this engine was dismantled and taken to the United States by Henry Ford who had it completely restored. It was then placed at the Henry Ford Museum and Greenfield Village in Dearborn, Michigan.

== Name ==
The name "Fairbottom Bobs" is older than the Newcomen engine. It was used to describe the pumps driven by water wheels driven by the River Medlock. The 'bobs' were L-shaped linkages designed to convert the circular motion of the wheels into an up-and-down pumping action. Early maps show the Newcomen engine as "Mr. Lees' Engine" and the Ashton Company had to negotiate with Mr. Lees (in 1798) to have the water redirected into the canal when it was built.

== Points of interest ==
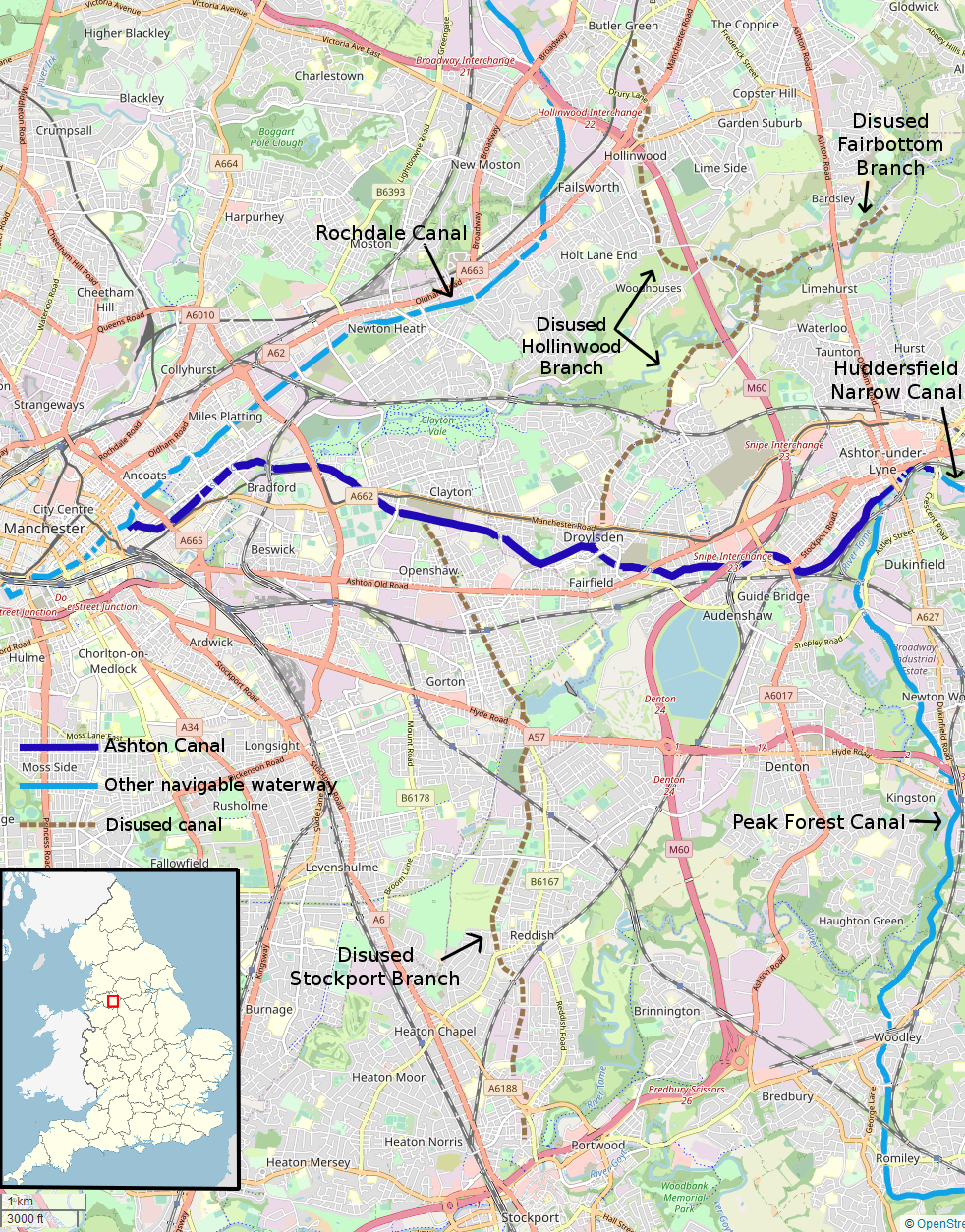
Map of Ashton Canal and its branches

Point	Coordinates (Links to map resources)	OS Grid Ref	Notes
Old Lane Colliery basin	53.5310°N 2.1414°W	SD907038	
Hollinwood Basin	53.5211°N 2.1433°W	SD905027	Original terminus
Crime Lake	53.5079°N 2.1277°W	SD916012	
Fairbottom Junction	53.5060°N 2.1225°W	SD919010	
Fenny Fields Bridge wharf	53.5120°N 2.0995°W	SD935017	Terminus of Fairbottom branch
M60 motorway embankment	53.4989°N 2.1258°W	SD917002	route cut
Site of railway aqueduct	53.4897°N 2.1367°W	SJ910992	
Junction with Ashton Canal	53.4779°N 2.1495°W	SJ901979	

== See also ==
- Canals of the United Kingdom
- History of the British canal system
