= Fairbottom Branch Canal =

Former canal near Ashton-under-Lyne in Greater Manchester, England

Coordinates: 53°30′21″N 2°07′20″W

The Fairbottom Branch Canal was a canal near Ashton-under-Lyne in Greater Manchester, England.

== Route ==
The canal left the Hollinwood Branch Canal at Fairbottom Junction immediately above lock 22. It was just over one mile long (1.82 km) and it was lock free. It terminated at Fenny Fields Bridge, Bardsley, which is situated in the Medlock Valley between Ashton-under-Lyne and Oldham.

== History ==
Although this canal was mainly rural, its main purpose was to carry coal so there was a loading stage for coal and a short private branch for the same purpose. There was also a mill.

Immediately north east of the terminus at Fenny Fields Bridge an industrial community was founded at Park Bridge and a tramway, which included a small-bore tunnel 150 yards (140 m) long, connected the two together. This community was founded in 1783 by Samuel Lees to make rollers for the textile industry. This community expanded rapidly as the demand for textile machinery increased. Following the premature death of Samuel in 1804 the factory was successfully run by his widow Hannah Lees née Buckley and in later years the company was renamed Hannah Lees & Sons in her honour. The last part of this works closed in 1963 due to the decline in the textile industry.

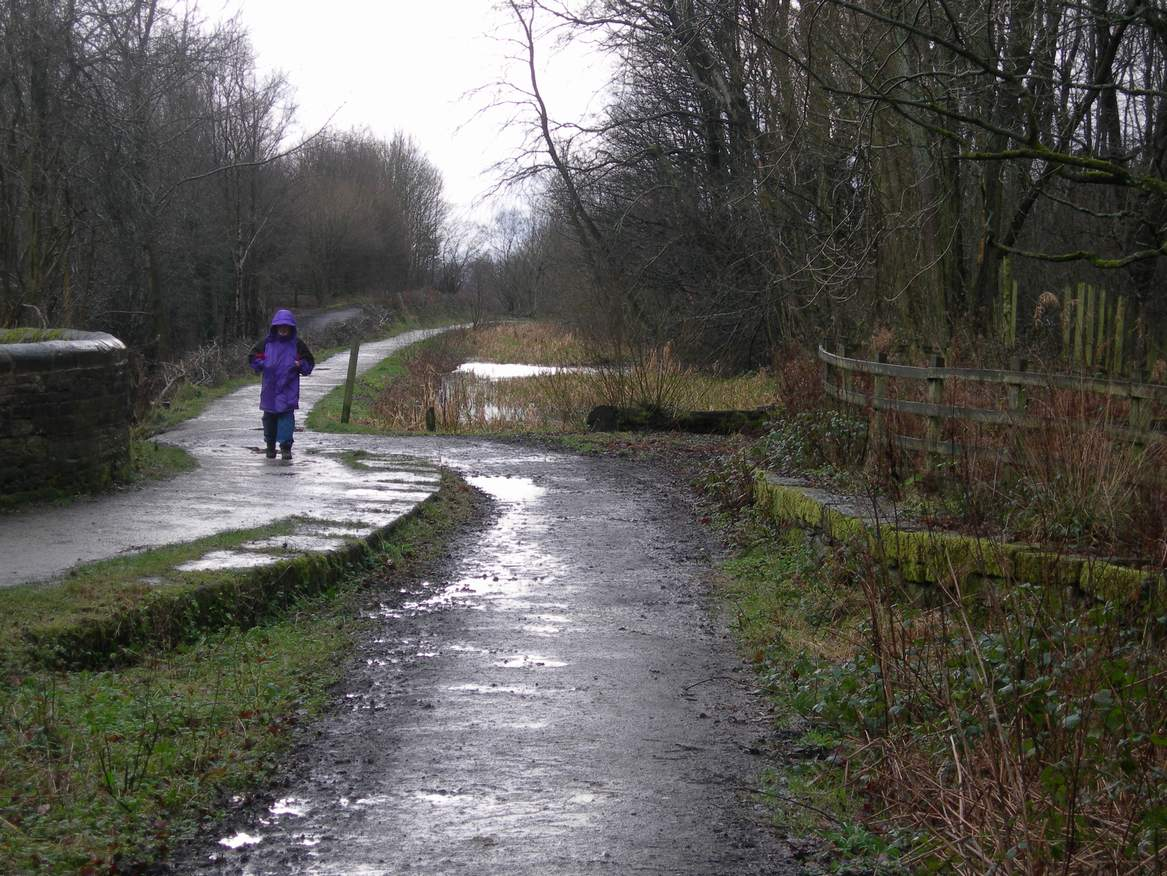
Fairbottom Branch

Around 1800, water was being supplied to this canal by Fairbottom Bobs, a Newcomen engine working for mine drainage.

At first, waggon haulage on the tramway was by means of horses but early in the 1840s a steam locomotive called 'The Ashtonian' replaced them. Because of the narrow-bore tunnel, the driver needed to be of short stature and even then he had to kneel down to pass through the tunnel. The locomotive's funnel also had to be removed. This tramway remained operational into the 1880s.

In the early 1930s two leakages occurred that made it necessary to lower the water level in the canal and this, coupled with mining subsidence, caused its unofficial closure in 1932. By 1948 the canal was completely unnavigable but it did remain in water.

Much of the line of the former canal remained intact and there are now plans to re-open part of it again as an amenity canal along with much of the Hollinwood Branch Canal.

== See also ==
- Canals of Great Britain
- History of the British canal system
