= Four Heatons =

Suburban areas in Greater Manchester, England

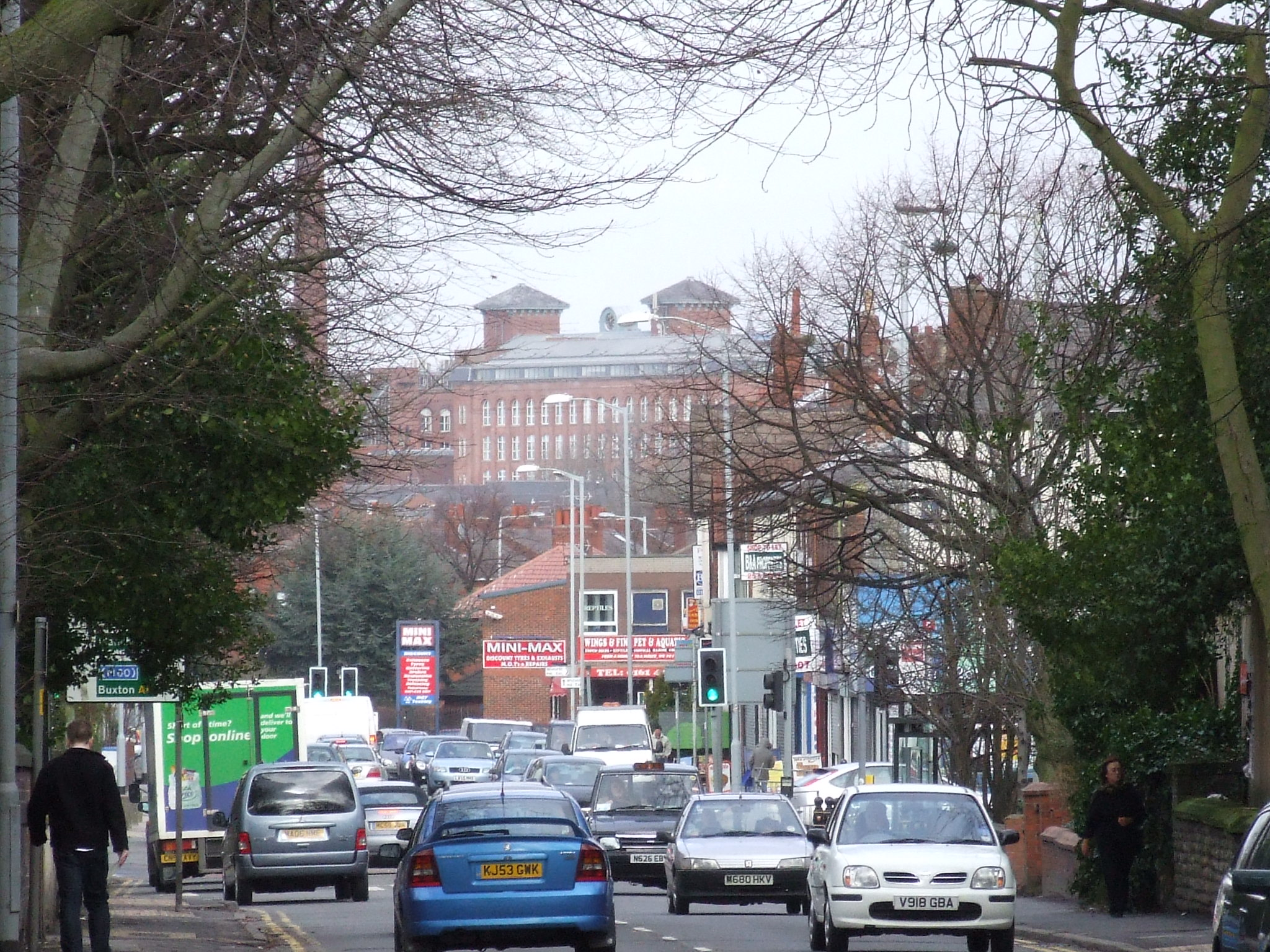
Looking from Heaton Moor, through Heaton Chapel to Reddish in 2008

The Four Heatons are four neighbourhoods, Heaton Chapel, Heaton Mersey, Heaton Moor and Heaton Norris, which form a suburban area of Stockport in North West England. North of the River Mersey, they were historically in Lancashire.

It is a commuter zone, with greenbelt and a conservation area, and is coterminous with the SK4 postcode district.

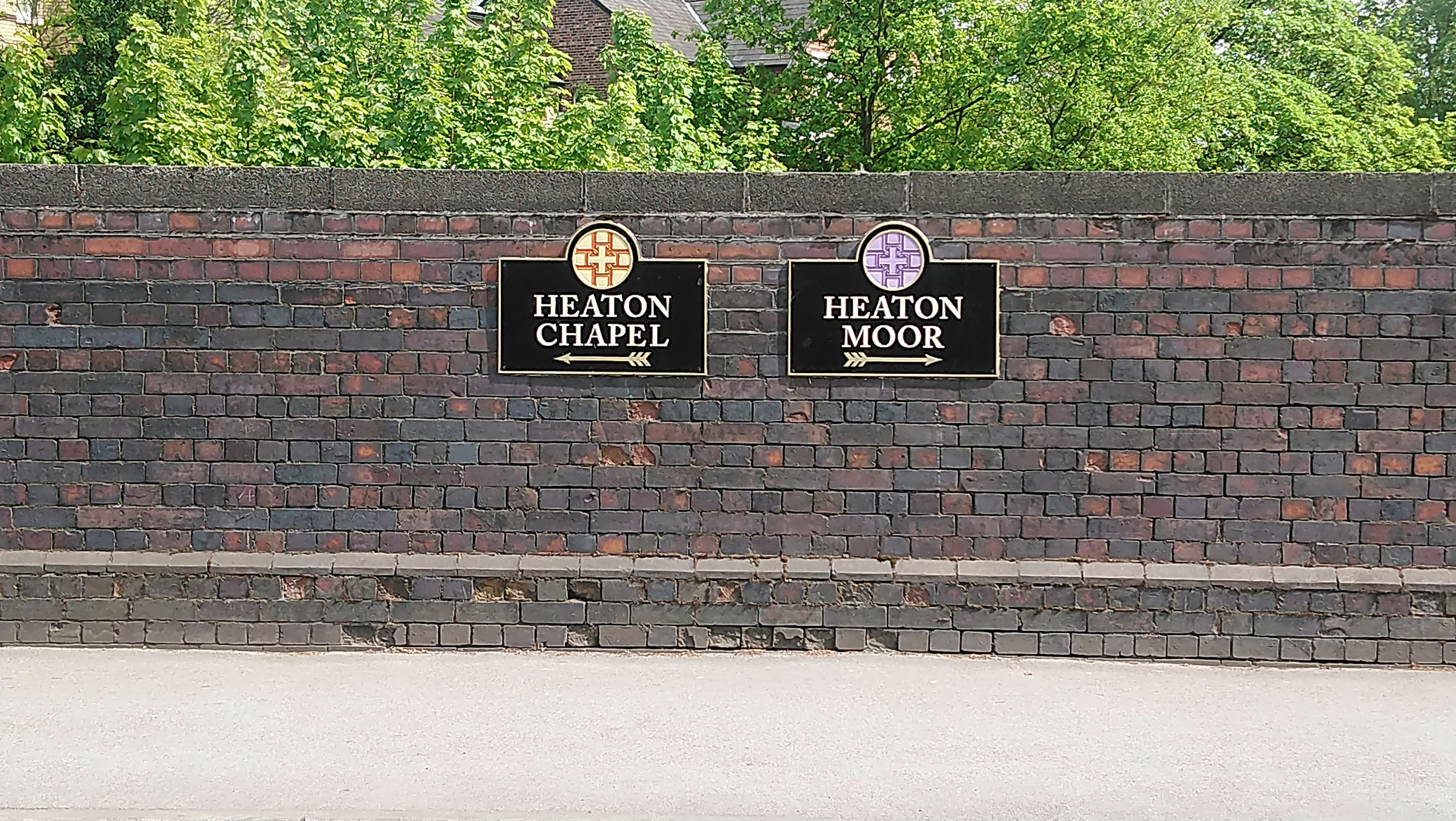
Signs at the bridge above Heaton Chapel railway station in 2018

The opening of railway stations, at Heaton Norris in 1840 and Heaton Chapel in 1853, resulted in the suburbanisation of the Four Heatons.

The area is home to various retailers, as well as bars, delicatessens, independent music venues and a privately owned single-screen cinema.
