= Heaton Moor =

Suburb of Stockport, Greater Manchester, England

Coordinates: 53.417°N 2.189°W

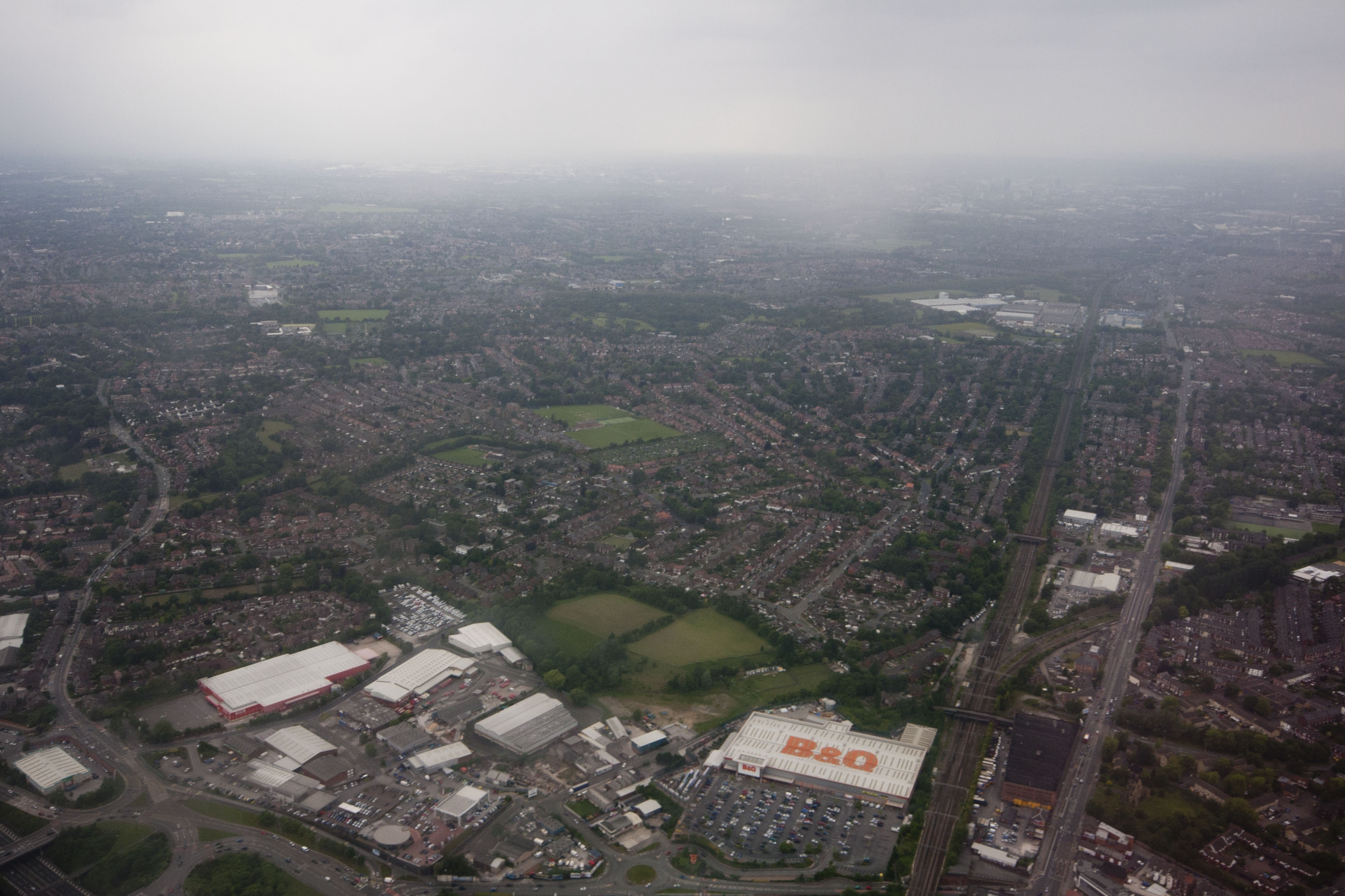
- Viewed from the south in 2010

- Location within Greater Manchester
- OS grid reference: SJ 876 917
- Metropolitan borough: Stockport
- Metropolitan county: Greater Manchester
- Region: North West
- Country: England
- Sovereign state: United Kingdom
- Post town: STOCKPORT
- Postcode district: SK4
- Dialling code: 0161
- Police: Greater Manchester
- Fire: Greater Manchester
- Ambulance: North West
- UK Parliament: Stockport

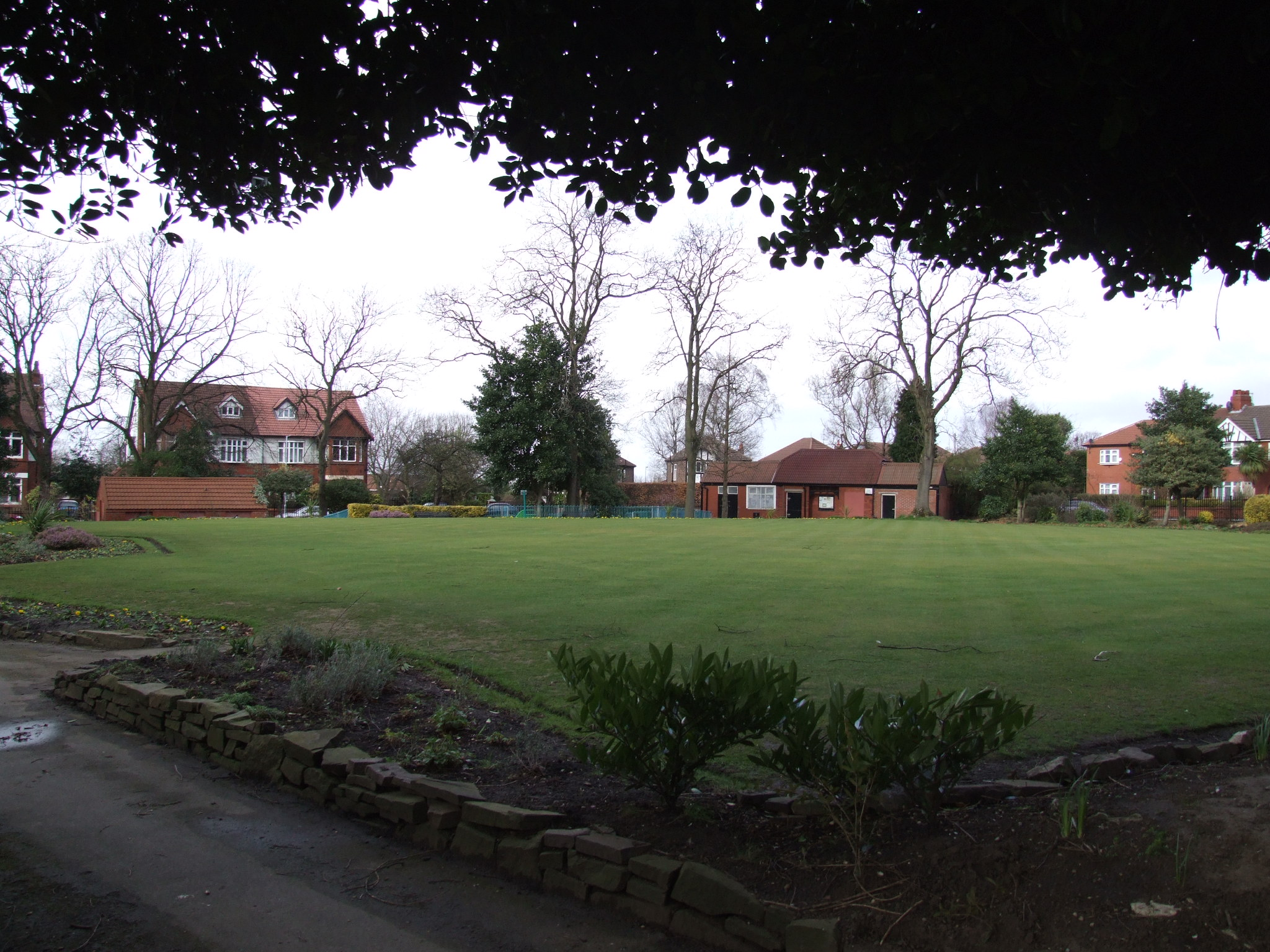
The bowling green in Heaton Moor Park, 2008

Heaton Moor is a suburb of Stockport, Greater Manchester, England. It is one of the Four Heatons and borders Heaton Chapel, Heaton Norris and Heaton Mersey. Heaton Moor has Victorian housing, built between 1852 and 1892, along affluent tree-lined streets which follow the field patterns of a former agricultural economy.

== Governance ==
Heaton Moor is in the Metropolitan Borough of Stockport, mainly within the Heatons South ward. It was originally in the township of Heaton Norris, in the Salford Hundred of Lancashire. Following the 1834 Poor Law Amendment Act it was administered by Heaton Norris Local Board as part of the Stockport Poor Law Union. In 1913, Heaton Moor, as part of Heaton Norris, was absorbed into the County Borough of Stockport.

== Geography ==
The land in Heaton Moor is predominantly flat with no rivers or streams. The soil is black and fertile as expected from land that was previously peat moor. Heaton Moor has little public open space with the exception of Heaton Moor Park and Thornfield Park, but because of its tree-lined roads and the building line set well back from the street, it gives the impression of having more space, and a Victorian business class style.

== History ==
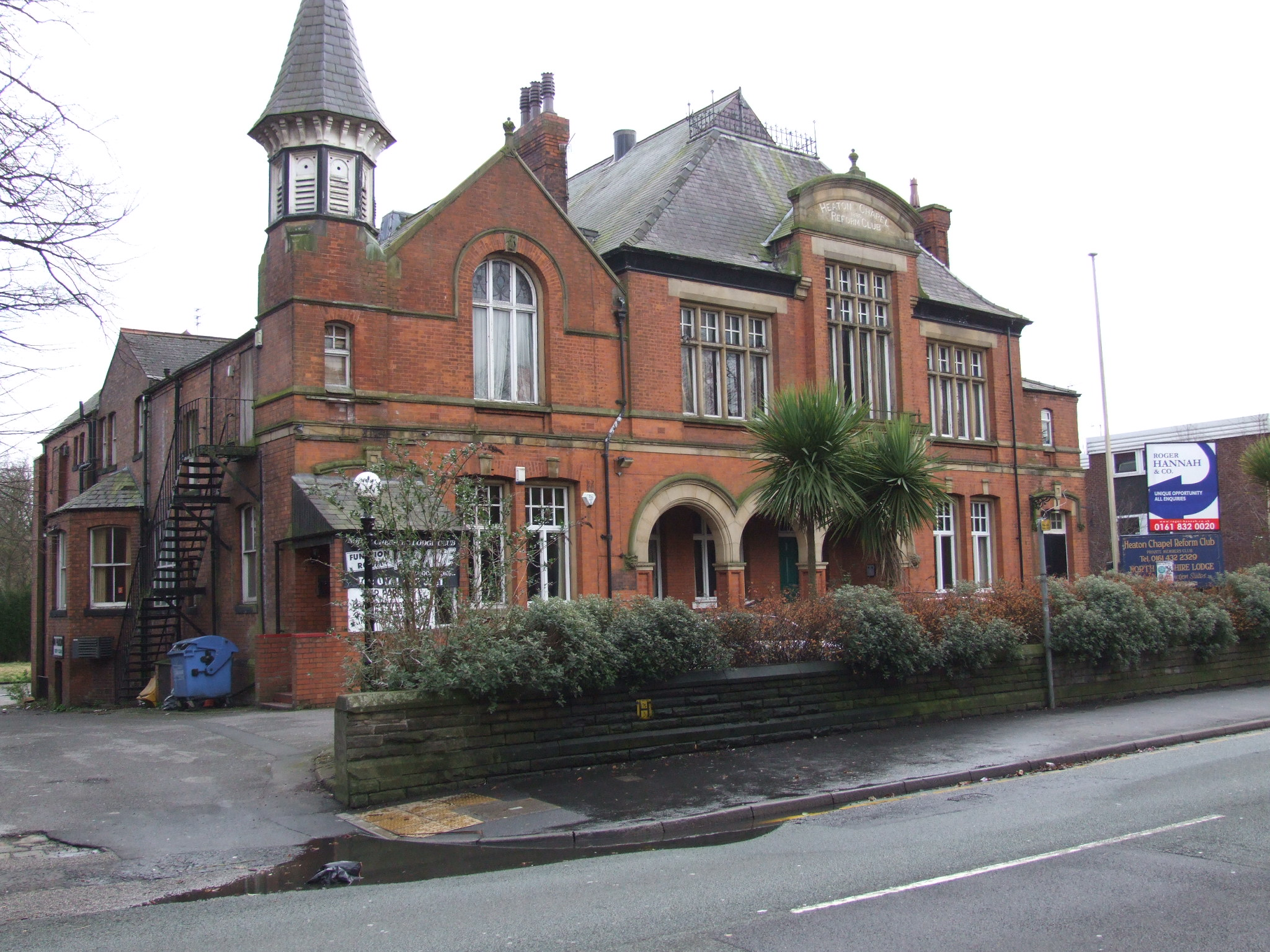
The Reform Club in 2008

Before the opening of the railway, Heaton Moor was agricultural land in Heaton Norris. The land supported pigs, cattle and cereal. Heaton Norris was part of the Manchester barony of the Grelley family but, between 1162 and 1180, it belonged to William le Norreys. In the early 13th century, Heaton Norris was a sub manor of Manchester; it encompassed all of the Four Heatons. In 1322, there were 32 dwellings suggesting a population of 150; the ten freeholders of the escheated manor had the right to graze on common pasture and to cut wood. Evidence of this pre-railway existence can be seen from the name Shaw Farm, Shaw Fold farm and the road pattern; Heaton Moor Road, Shaw Road, Shaw Fold Lane, Pin Fold, Green Lane. Parsonage Road and Cranbourne Avenue follow the lines of ancient tracks.

The opening of Heaton Chapel railway station marked a turning point in development of the area; land was acquired and streets were planned. The houses and new buildings along Heaton Moor Road were of a grandiose scale with generous gardens. They are set back from the road, and have imposing stone gate posts. The new residential roads, such as Broomfield Road, Derby Road, and Peel Moat Road which were built when agricultural land was acquired, have the same characteristics. The building and infilling continued into the Edwardian era. There were a wide range of sporting facilities, such as crown green bowling, tennis and golf. A substantial terrace of shops was built on Heaton Moor Road, with glass and cast iron awnings. Intellectual life was provided for when the Reform Club was built in 1886 by Alfred Darbyshire.

The Savoy Cinema opened 1923, built in the Baroque style in red brick with white terracota dressings. When, in 2006, the cinema announced its closure due to low audiences, there was uproar amongst locals; it was announced that it could be replaced by a Varsity bar. A Save Our Savoy campaign was launched. Plans for the bar were rejected. It has new owners, has been refurbished and reopened in 2015.

A second hub was built around the former council offices in Thornfield Road, in the area known as Moor Top. The main thoroughfare is now home to a champagne bar, boutiques, florists and upmarket restaurants.

== Mauldeth Hall ==
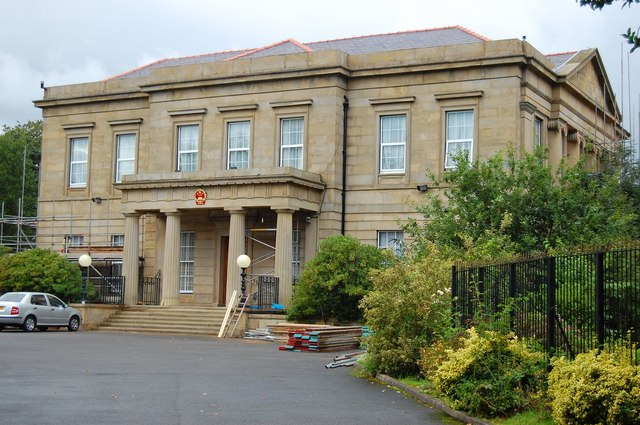
Mauldeth Hall in 2008

Mauldeth Hall is a large Greek Revival villa, built in 1832–60, for Joseph Chessborough Dyer; it was extended in 1880–82 by Charles Heathcote so that it could become a "hospital for incurables". After it became derelict in the late 20th century, the hall was converted to offices; most of the park and gardens of the hall have been taken over by Heaton Moor Golf Club. On Mauldeth Road is a classical lodge, probably also by Heathcote. It has been a Grade II listed building since 1975.

The original owner was obliged to sell the hall in the early 1840s and it was acquired by Edmund Wright (1781–1852) as his residence. It was then named Leegate Hall but Wright renamed it Heaton Hall; since there was also a Heaton Hall at Prestwich, he renamed it again as Mauldeth Hall. On the death of Edmund Wright in 1852, the hall was acquired by the Ecclesiastical Commissioners as the residence of the first Bishop of Manchester; James Prince Lee, in position since 1848, lived in the hall until his death in 1869. In 1915 the Hospital for Incurables at Mauldeth Hall and Walmersley House had accommodation for 125 inpatients.

After its restoration in the 1990s, the hall became the residence of the Consul General of the People's Republic of China in Manchester.

== Education ==
Tithe Barn Primary School, rated Outstanding by Ofsted, is located just over the border in Heaton Mersey. Heaton Moor is home to Charnwood Nursery, which provides inclusive education for children with and without special educational needs and disabilities, and is also rated Outstanding. The Heaton Secondary Special School is available for students with disabilities. The Heaton Moor campus of Stockport College was on Buckingham Road. This is now demolished and has been converted into new homes. St Thomas's Junior School is situated on Buckingham Road.

The district had for many years a boys' boarding school called Heaton Moor College. Boys mainly from the Middle East stayed in the main school building, a large detached Victorian villa house, on Heaton Moor Road. Its large rear garden harboured other classroom buildings as well as a playground. It was at its height in the early to mid 1950s. In 1953 there were 202 pupils and a teaching staff of 12. A block of flats now stands on the site.

== Religion ==
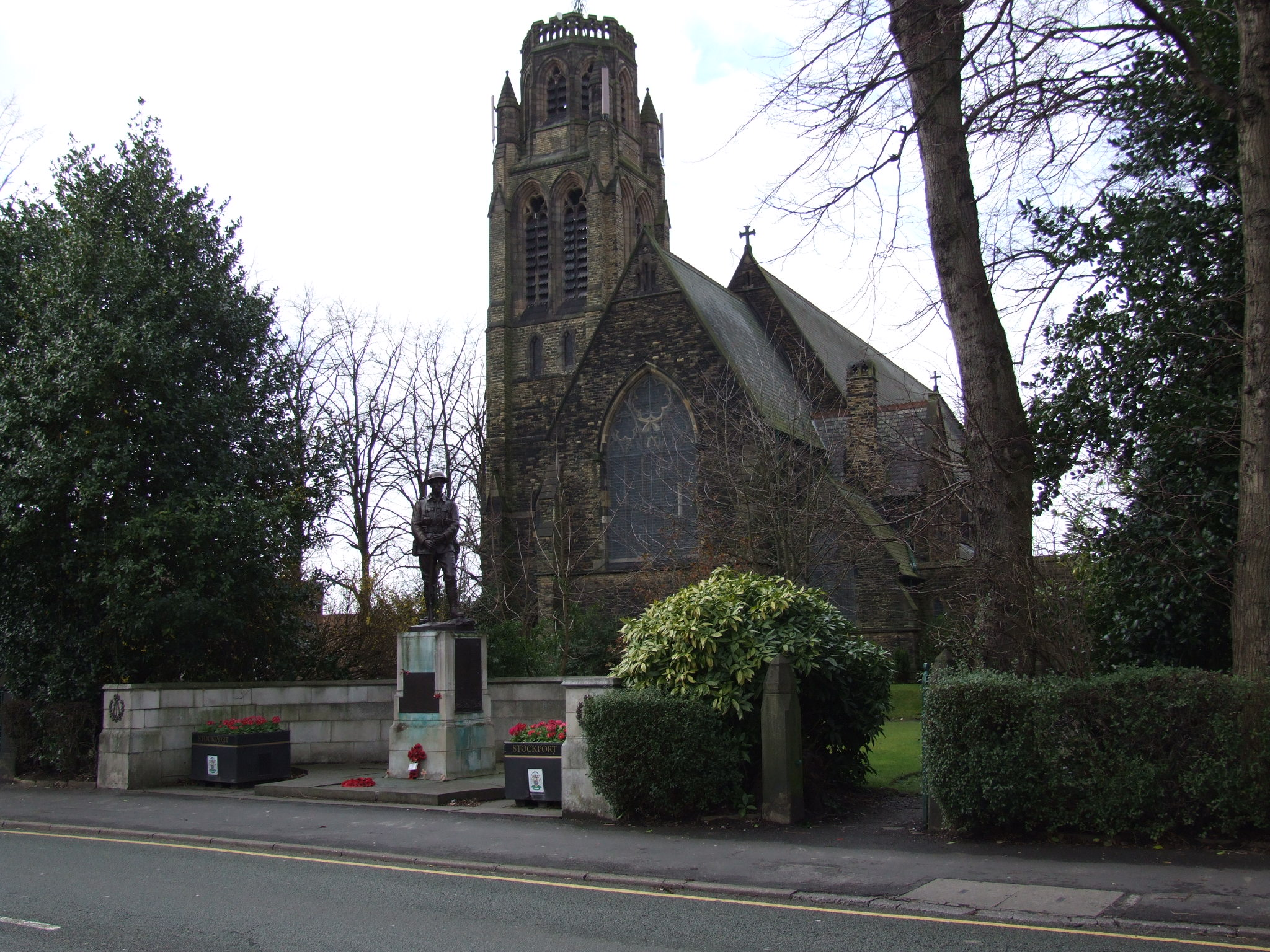
St Paul's and the war memorial in 2008

- St Paul's Church – low Anglican built 1876 by Bird and Whittenbury, extended in 1896 and the octagonal tower added in 1900 by EP Oakley.
- Heaton Moor Congregational Church – later Heaton Moor United Reformed Church – now Virgin St Mary and St Mina Coptic Church – built 1896 by Derbyshire and Smith.
- Heaton Moor United Church (Methodist & United Reformed – united in 2010) (formerly Heaton Moor Methodist Church) – corner of Heaton Moor Road and Stanley Road.
- Heaton Moor Evangelical Church, formerly on Green Lane, is now known as Emmanuel Community Church and meets on Sundays at Houldsworth Mill, Reddish, though youth and other clubs still meet on the Green Lane site.
- United Reformed Church (See Heaton Moor United Church above).

== Transport ==
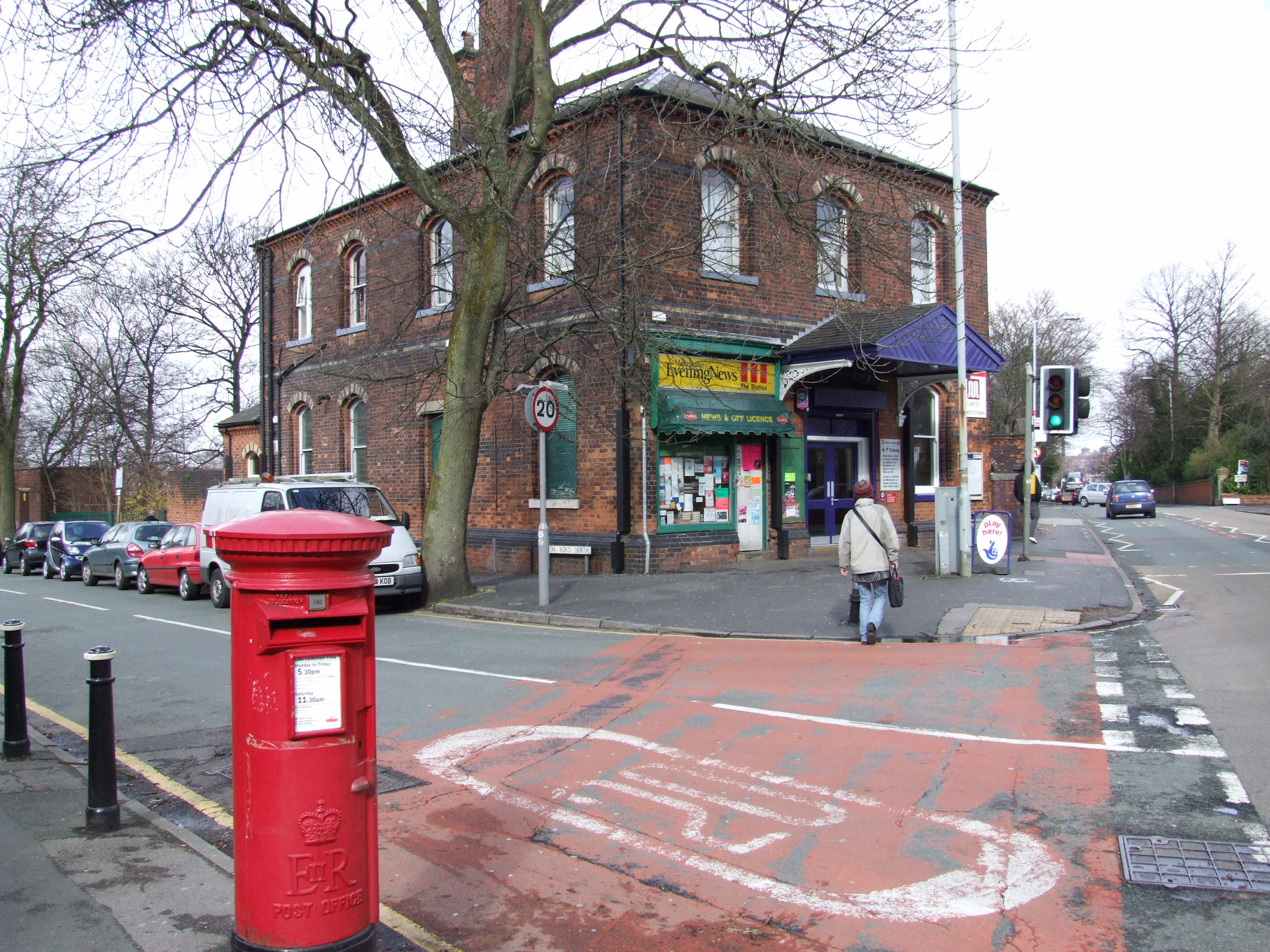
Ticket office at Heaton Chapel railway station in 2008

The Manchester and Birmingham Railway (M&BR) built the Crewe–Manchester line; the Manchester to Heaton Norris section opened in 1840 and Heaton Chapel railway station opened in 1852. The station is also a stop on the Stafford–Manchester line and the Buxton line. Northern Trains operates stopping services to Manchester Piccadilly, Stockport, Alderley Edge, Crewe, Stoke-on-Trent and Buxton.

Heaton Moor is built along Heaton Moor Road, a road leading from Reddish to Heaton Mersey.

Bus services are operated by Stagecoach Manchester; key routes include:

- 192 between Manchester, Stockport and Hazel Grove
- 25 between Stockport and the Trafford Centre
- 42A between Manchester, East Didsbury and Reddish.

== Economy ==
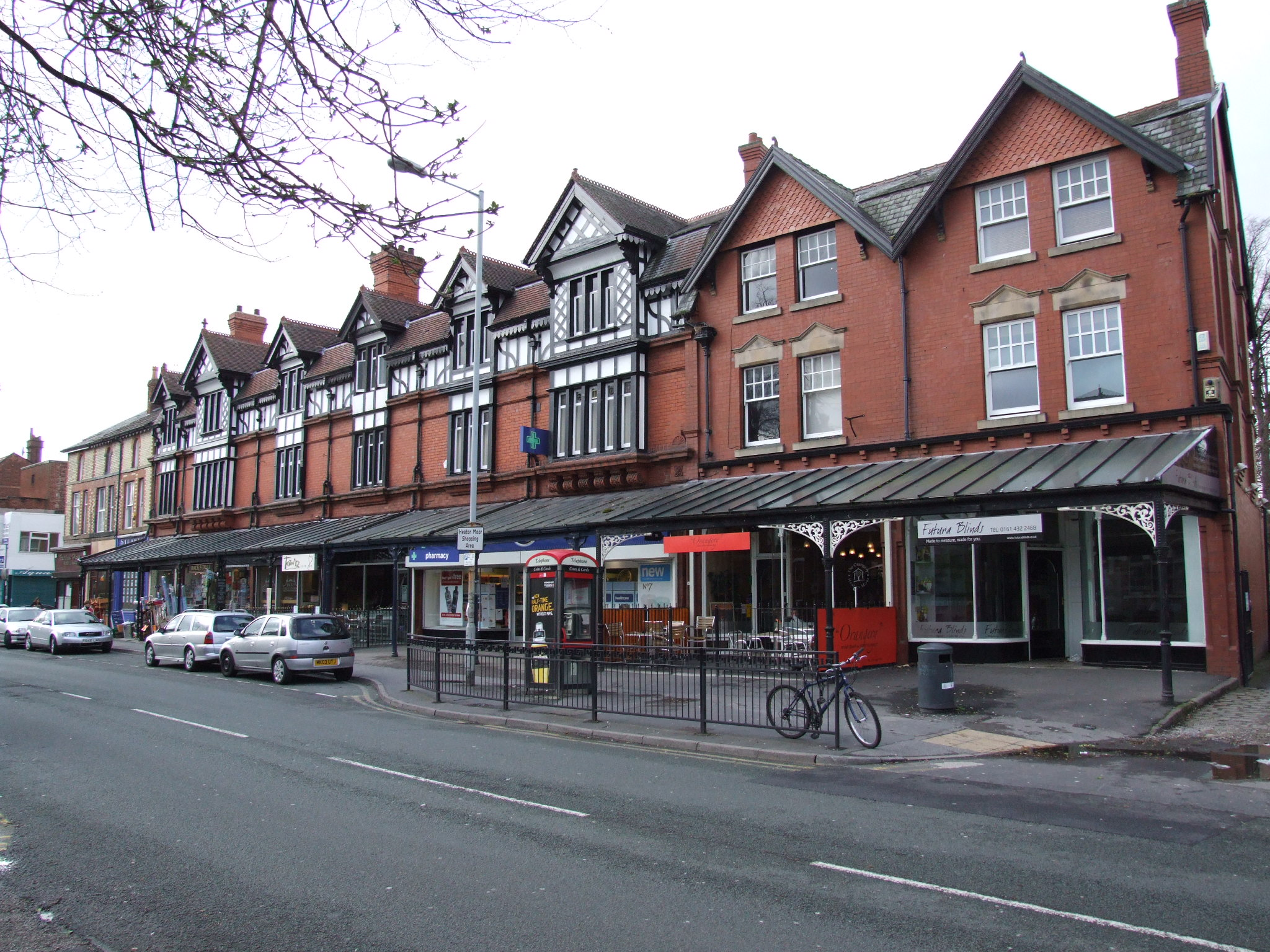
The shopping arcade, with wrought iron and glass canopy in 2008

Heaton Moor is an affluent area; in the Victorian era, it had an equal residential status to Alderley Edge and Bowdon. Today, this moneyed reputation continues as the SK4 postcode is typically characterised by high disposable incomes. The estimated household weekly income for Heaton Moor in 2001 was significantly above the average for Greater Manchester.

== Sport ==
Heaton Moor Rugby Club has facilities for rugby, cricket, lacrosse and tennis in a multimillion-pound development.

Heaton Mersey lacrosse team has been based in Heaton Moor since 1879, playing on Green Lane at the Heatons Sports Club.

West Heaton Bowling, Tennis and Squash Club, established in 1873, has six all weather tennis courts, two squash courts and a bowling green.

Heaton Moor Golf Club, founded in 1892, is an 18-hole relatively flat, tree-lined course set in a conservation area.

Moor Road Runners, established in April 2022, is the main running club in Heaton Moor, with runs typically starting and finishing at one of the many cafés, pubs or bars in the area.

== Personalities ==
=== Performing arts ===
Stuart Flinders from BBC North West Tonight is resident.

Dominic Monaghan, who played Meriadoc "Merry" Brandybuck in the film trilogy of The Lord of the Rings and Charlie Pace the television actor in Lost, was born in Germany but raised here. The Stone Roses' bassist Mani lived here until his death in 2025.

Manchester-born musician Norman Beaker, the ninth British blues artist to be inducted into the Blues Hall of Fame, has lived in Heaton Moor since 1985.

=== Sport ===
Heaton Moor was the birthplace of cricketer Charles Marriott

Tennis siblings Liam Broady and Naomi Broady and basketball player John Amaechi are Heaton Moor residents.

Kate Richardson-Walsh, captain of Great Britain's 2016 gold medal-winning hockey team, grew up in Heaton Moor, where she attended Tithe Barn School and Priestnall School.

=== Writers ===
Ronald Gow, dramatist, best known for Love on the Dole (1934), was born here.

The journalist, television presenter and Labour Party peer, Baroness Joan Bakewell.

The crime writer Val McDermid and screenwriter, playwright, and former journalist Danny Brocklehurst (Shameless, The Stretford Wives, Clocking Off, Sorted) and children's author Philip Caveney live (or have recently lived here. Children's author Jo Welch grew up in Heaton Moor and set her first book, The Einstein Code (2016), in the area.

The Guardian feminist and journalist Mary Stott and her husband lived here after moving from Leicester.

=== Businessmen ===
Cecil Kimber, the founder of M.G. Car Company lived in Heaton Moor, and was a pupil of Stockport Grammar School.

== See also ==
- Listed buildings in Stockport
