= Heaton Norris =

Suburb of Stockport, England

Coordinates: 53.417°N 2.166°W

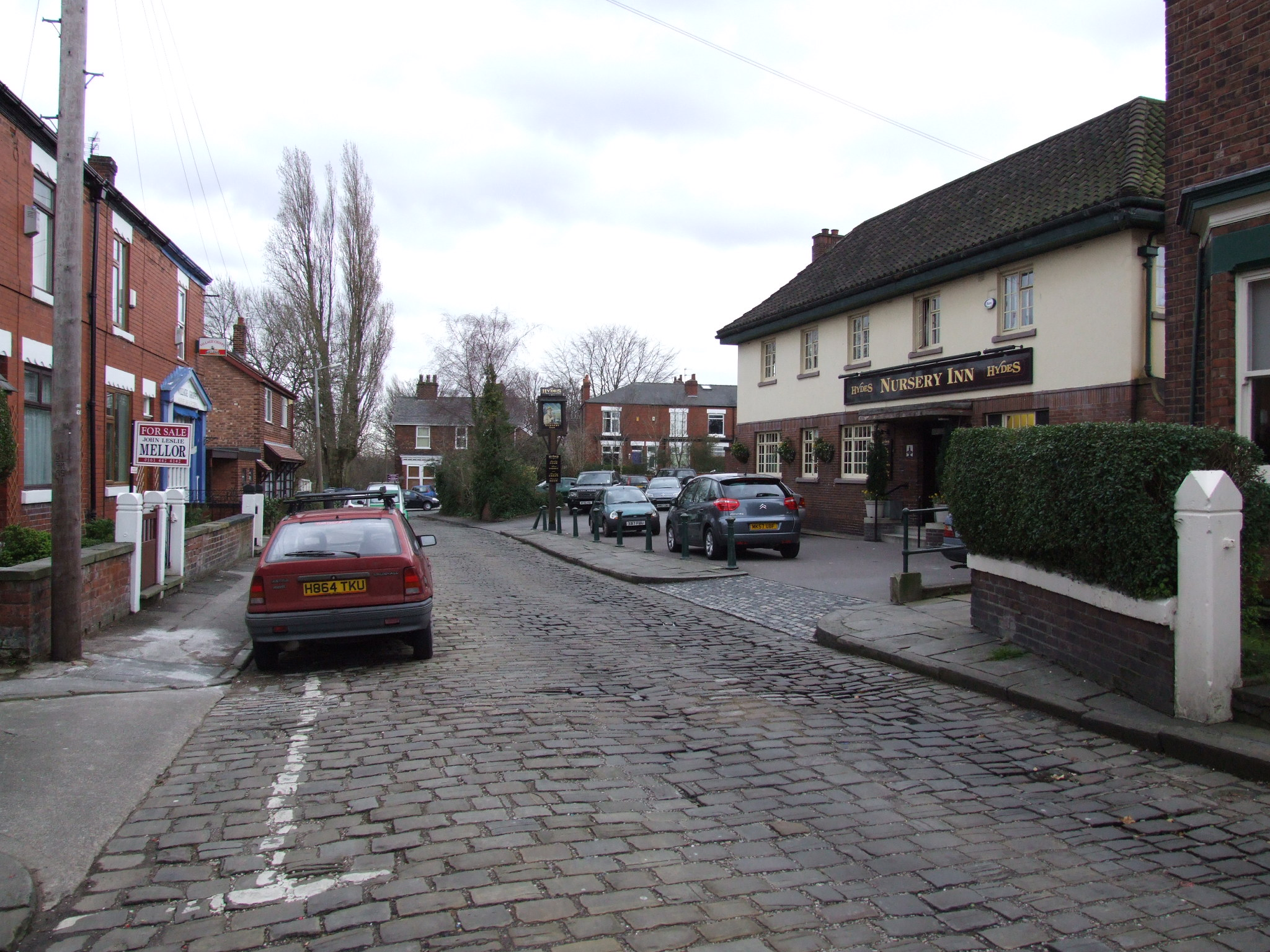
- The Nursery Inn pub on Green Lane, 2008

- Location within Greater Manchester
- Population: (2021 census)
- OS grid reference: SJ885909
- Metropolitan borough: Stockport
- Metropolitan county: Greater Manchester
- Region: North West
- Country: England
- Sovereign state: United Kingdom
- Post town: STOCKPORT
- Postcode district: SK4
- Dialling code: 0161
- Police: Greater Manchester
- Fire: Greater Manchester
- Ambulance: North West
- UK Parliament: Stockport

Heaton Norris is a suburb of Stockport, Greater Manchester, England. It is one of the Four Heatons, along with neighbours Heaton Chapel, Heaton Mersey and Heaton Moor. Originally within the boundaries of the historic county of Lancashire, part of Heaton Norris was annexed to the County Borough of Stockport in 1835; Heaton Chapel and Heaton Moor followed in 1894, and the remnant in 1913.

== History ==
Historically part of Lancashire, Heaton Norris was part of the Manchester baronry of the Grelley family, but between 1162 and 1180 it belonged to William le Norreys.

In the early 13th century, Heaton Norris, a sub manor of Manchester, encompassed all of the Four Heatons. It was escheated (i.e. reverted) to the manor of Manchester in around 1280. In 1322 there were 32 dwellings suggesting a population of 150, the ten freeholders of the escheated manor had the right to graze on common pasture and to cut wood. There was no chapel of ease, unlike neighbouring St Ostwalds at Didsbury, and it did not get one until St Thomas' was built in 1758.

The township remained part of the parish of Manchester in the Salford Hundred of Lancashire until 1835 when the southern portion of the parish was absorbed into Stockport. In 1866 Heaton Norris became a separate civil parish, in 1894, under the Local Government Act 1894, it was divided again, with a portion becoming part of Stockport county borough in Cheshire, and the remaining part forming the Heaton Norris urban district in Lancashire. A further 16 acres (65,000 m^{2}) transferred in 1901, and the remainder, Heaton Moor and Heaton Chapel, was added to Stockport County Borough on 9 November 1913. There was a referendum in the 1930s on whether the area wished to become part of Manchester again, but the vote was lost. On 1 April 1936 the parish was abolished and merged with Stockport. In 1931 the parish had a population of 13,410. Since 1974, it has formed part of the Metropolitan Borough of Stockport in Greater Manchester.

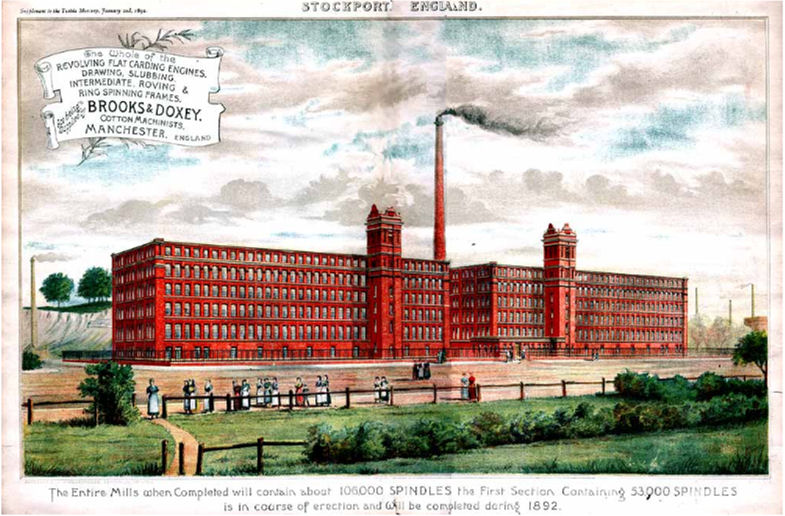
One of the three Stockport Ring Mills in Heaton Norris. The mills ran from 1892–1911 with 200,000 spindles

Weaving was first recorded in 1580 and by 1776 farms were being advertised as having cowsheds and large loom houses. In spite of the industrial developments nearby in Stockport and Manchester, most of Heaton Norris remained agricultural, though in 1836 there were 20 mills employing upwards of 5,000. The rural nature changed with the arrival of the railway station at Heaton Norris in 1840 and Heaton Chapel in 1852, when the area became largely residential in order to house workers in local mills. The majority of Heaton Norris is characterised by deck-access or high-rise estates (such as Lancashire Hill) and Victorian terraced housing.

Heaton Norris Rovers, now known as Stockport County Football Club, was formed in 1883, and used to play on a pitch behind the Nursery Inn suburban pub on Green Lane. In 1902 they left the Green Lane ground and moved to Edgeley Park.

== Geography ==
Heaton Norris, Heaton Mersey, Heaton Moor and Heaton Chapel are on the north bank of the River Mersey and south of the Cringle Brook; it is sited to the west of Reddish and the River Tame.

The land slopes gently towards the north from a high point in the south above a steep descent to the River Mersey. Most of the townships are between 60 and 70 metres (200 and 230 ft) above sea level, and 30 to 60 metres (98 to 197 ft) above the river. Heaton Norris is about 4.5 miles (7 km) south of St Ann's Square, Manchester.

The soil is clay on marl and red sandstone.

== Transport ==
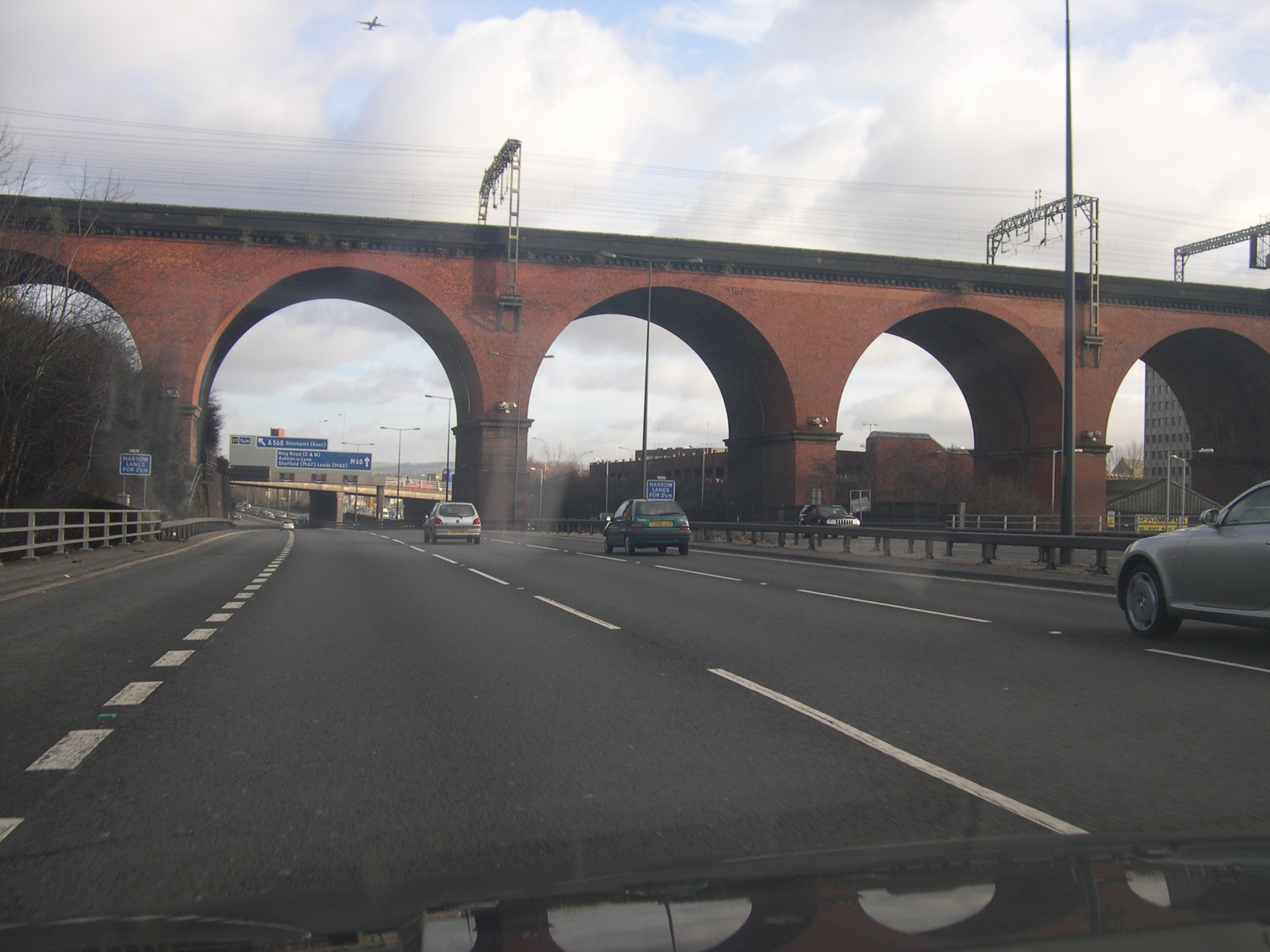
The M60 motorway and Stockport Viaduct at the foot of Norris Bank, 2006

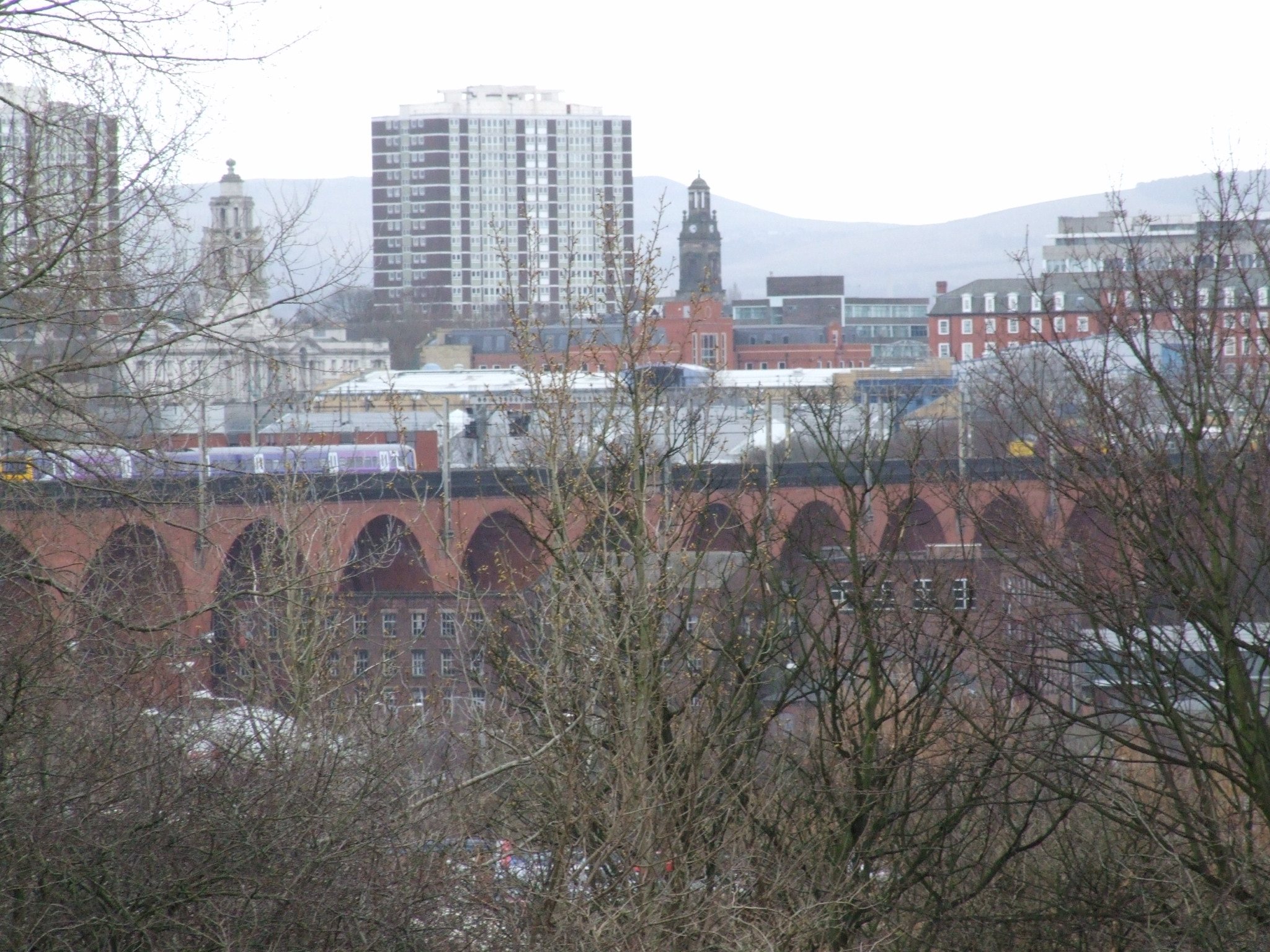
Stockport Viaduct, with Stockport town centre in the background, 2008

The former Manchester to Buxton Roman road, now the A6, passes through Heaton Norris. The M60 motorway passes to the south of the suburb; junction 1 serves Heaton Norris.

A spur of the West Coast Main Line (WCML) between London Euston and Manchester Piccadilly passes through the suburb, over the large brick-built Stockport Viaduct. Heaton Norris railway station was a stop on the line, before it was closed in 1959.

The Stockport, Timperley and Altrincham Junction Railway (ST&AJR), operated by Cheshire Lines Committee (CLC), ran parallel the north bank of the river. This provided passenger services between Manchester Central, Liverpool, Warrington Central and Derby until January 1967; freight services continued until 1983 when the line was closed.

The Stockport Branch Canal of the Ashton Canal terminated at Heaton Norris.

== Industry ==
In 1820 miller and political figure William Nelstrop established his flour mill on Lancashire Hill. Nelstrops Albion Flour Mills were rebuilt on the same site in 1893 following a fire. The company is now one of Britain's largest independent flour millers.

== Community facilities ==
Notable landmarks in Heaton Norris include:

- Bryant's Warehouse/former London and North Western Railway Goods Warehouse (Grade II listed)
- A large B&Q superstore which, when first opened, was the largest in the country.
- Bowerfold Open Space, known locally as The Bonks, popular with locals for dog walking, equestrianism, its football pitch, and, after heavy snowfalls, sledging.
- All Saints' Church, designed by Preston and Vaughan and consecrated in 1888, is on the corner of Manchester Road and All Saints Road; it runs a number of community projects, such as the award winning free music school for children, Heaton's Hotpots free meals and various groups for children, young people and families. The church also has an active brass band and choir.

== In popular culture ==
In the 1990s, the BBC mock talk show The Mrs Merton Show, and its spin-off black comedy sitcom, Mrs Merton and Malcolm (1999), the title character, Mrs Merton, played by Manchester native Caroline Aherne, often refers to living in Heaton Norris. The latter series was set in the area.

Another BBC sitcom, Early Doors, principally written by and starring Aherne's collaborator Craig Cash (also a former Heaton Norris resident), revolved around a failing pub, which by inference and local references was also in Heaton Norris. The pub was set in The Grapes, Stockport, and based on the since closed Three Crowns in Heaton Norris.

Some of the scenes for the BBC One comedy drama Sunshine, starring Steve Coogan, Bernard Hill, Craig Cash and Phil Mealey, were filmed in the Nursery Inn, a local pub. Part of an advert for Paddy Power starring Ryan Giggs' brother Rhodri was also filmed in Heaton Norris Park.

== See also ==
- Christ Church, Heaton Norris
