= Heaton Chapel =

Suburb of Stockport, Greater Manchester, England

Coordinates: 53.4271°N 2.1774°W

- Location within Greater Manchester
- Population: (2001 census)
- OS grid reference: SJ880925
- Metropolitan borough: Stockport
- Metropolitan county: Greater Manchester
- Region: North West
- Country: England
- Sovereign state: United Kingdom
- Post town: STOCKPORT
- Postcode district: SK4, M19
- Dialling code: 0161
- Police: Greater Manchester
- Fire: Greater Manchester
- Ambulance: North West
- UK Parliament: Stockport

Heaton Chapel is a suburb of Stockport, Greater Manchester, England. Within the boundaries of the historic county of Lancashire, it borders the Manchester districts of Levenshulme to the north, the Stockport districts of Heaton Moor to the west, Reddish and Heaton Norris to the east, and Heaton Mersey to the west and south. Heaton Chapel and its neighbouring areas are known collectively as the Four Heatons.

== History ==
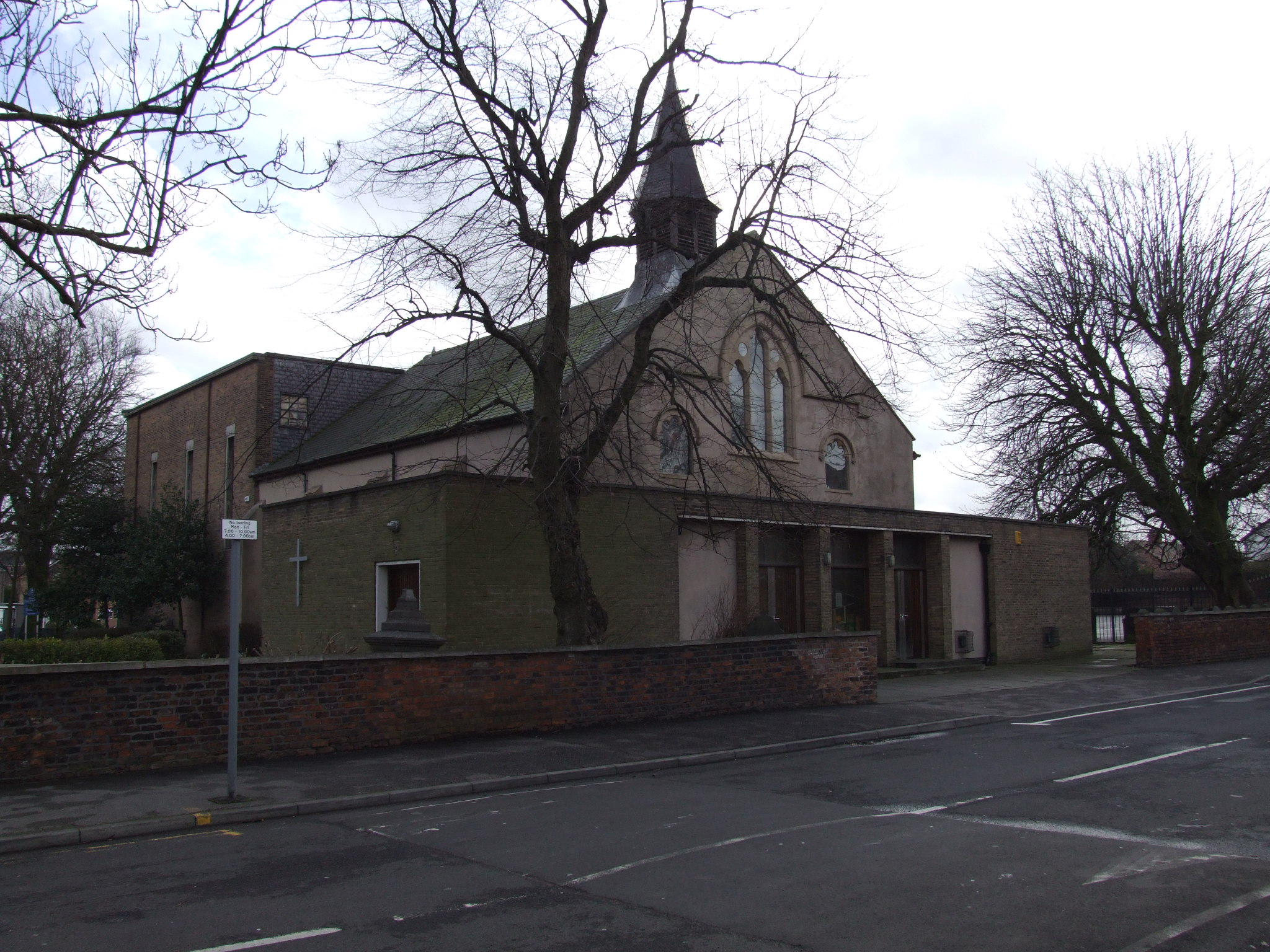
St Thomas' Church in 2008

Before 1758, Heaton Chapel did not exist but was simply part of the Lancashire parish of Heaton Norris. The need for a chapel was identified in the Parliamentary Commission's Lancashire and Cheshire church surveys 1649–1655, but it was a further hundred years before Mr A. Colier raised money by public subscription and Mr Sidebotham petitioned the bishop of Chester for a licence to worship in 1758; it was dedicated 28 October 1758. It is speculated that the need for the chapel was stimulated by the preaching of Anglican cleric Charles Wesley who visited Stockport in 1745. The Church was built on a field known as Yarn Croft of 1,712 square yards. The building was plain brick, with three rounded windows on the North side and three on the South side. There was a small projecting chancel which served as a place for the communion table, lit by means of a long round-headed window, with two long rectangular windows on each side. The church is 'miswent'; that is not built on a true east–west axis. In 2015, the Diocese of Manchester changed the official address of the church from Heaton Norris to Heaton Chapel – 250 years after its establishment.

=== Transport history ===
The principal road from Manchester to Stockport and the south ran through Heaton Chapel along the line of the present Manchester Road. It was turnpiked in 1724. There was a toll gate opposite the church. It entered Stockport down Lancashire Hill. In 1826 a new turnpike was built.

In 1837, Parliamentary approval was given for the railway to be built by the Manchester and Birmingham Railway (M&BR), and the first section from Heaton Norris to Manchester Travis Street opened in 1841, but a viaduct needed to be built at Stockport. The London and North Western Railway (LNWR) completed the Crewe–Manchester line; the rector, Mr Jackson, used personal influence to have a station built in 1851 close to the rectory in Heaton Moor Road. The station was built in a cutting. There was already a Heaton Norris station, on Georges Road, so the new station was named Heaton Chapel. The subsequent growth of the Heaton Moor area led to a temporary change of the railway station name: Heaton Chapel for Heaton Moor, then Heaton Chapel and Heaton Moor; it has since returned to Heaton Chapel. This line was electrified in 1959.

In the inter-war years, there was a tram service along Wellington Road operated jointly by Manchester and Stockport corporations. Stockport used 460v DC and Manchester 400 volts, so the Manchester trams would need more resistance in the circuit. The Stockport trams would probably have been able to manage without swapping, they would just be on a slightly lower voltage. The trams stopped at the Levenshulme/Heaton Chapel border, so the resistances could be changed and the collectors changed manually from one set of wires to the others.

=== Residential history ===
A number of mansions were built close to the border with Heaton Moor during the early 20th century. This part of Heaton Chapel today has a degree of palatial and expensive housing by the standards of Greater Manchester. In 2018, Heaton Chapel was ranked higher than Didsbury in The Times Best Places to Live report. The Heatons appeared as one of The Times best places to live in the region in 2023. Heaton Chapel was specifically named as forming one of the top 10 places to live in the UK by 2024. Heaton Chapel returned to being in the region's best places to live in 2025.

== Local economy ==
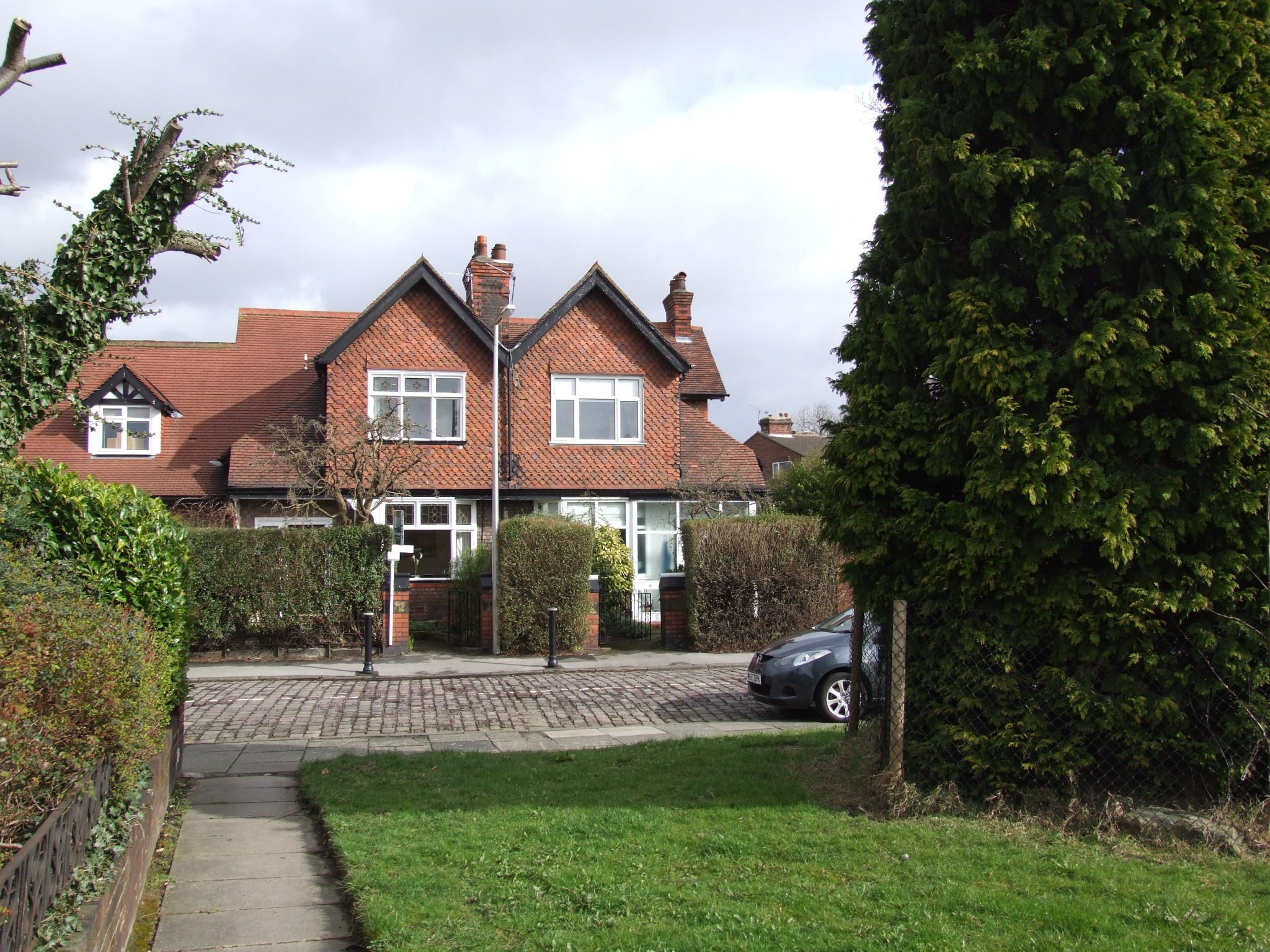
Heaton Chapel is largely residential, characterised by substantial well detailed early 20th century houses

A large biscuit works was opened in 1918 by McVitie & Price, later McVitie's, part of United Biscuits. In this location, chocolate-covered foods such as Penguin biscuits and Jaffa Cakes are manufactured.

Crossley Bros. Ltd commenced motor car production in 1906 after several years experience of building engines and, by the end of 1916, had already supplied large numbers of tenders to the Royal Flying Corps (RFC). In addition, production of Beardmore and Bentley Aero engines was undertaken. Wartime expansion of production had led to the acquisition of premises at High Lane, Heaton Chapel. This subsequently was renamed Crossley Road and marked the spot where Stockport became Manchester.

In 1917, the factory was adapted to produce Airco DH.9 single-engined biplane and DH.10 Amiens twin-engined heavy bombers. It was known as the National Aircraft Factory No. 2, employed 2,500 people and was managed by Crossley Motors. About 450 DH.9s and seven DH.10 Amiens were completed before production ceased, after the Armistice of 11 November 1918.

In 1934, the factory was acquired by Mr (later Sir) Richard Fairey, who wanted additional factory space to produce aircraft ordered under the UK's re-armament programme; thus the Fairey Aviation Company was based on Crossley Road, next to the railway line.

The factory manufactured 14 Fairey Hendon, 1,154 Battle, 600 Fulmar and 675 Barracuda aircraft and also reconditioned Swordfishes. Fairey's also built, under sub-contract, over 660 Handley Page Halifaxes and nearly 500 Bristol Beaufighters. Heaton Chapel had design staff and manufacturing capacity. Assembly was at Barton Aerodrome for a short period, then at RAF Ringway from June 1937 onwards.

In 1951, the Fairey Delta 1 was built here. On 10 March 1956, the Fairey Delta 2, with components manufactured at Heaton Chapel, broke the World Air Speed Record at 1820 km/h (1132 mph).

From 1954, the Gannet was also built here although production of the 338 aircraft was shared with the company's other factory at Hayes, Middlesex.

In 1946, the company diversified into the nuclear power industry, forming Fairey Stainless.

In 1986, Fairey Engineering was taken over by Williams Holdings and became Williams Fairey Engineering Ltd; it is now known as WFEL. The Air Portable Ferry Bridge (APFB) is a lightweight 40-metre bridge that can be transported to site in a C130 aircraft and erected by 8 engineers in 90 minutes. It is in use in Iraq and Helmand Province, Afghanistan.

Fairey Aviation sponsored the Fairey Brass Band, who hold rehearsals in Heaton Chapel.

== Transport ==
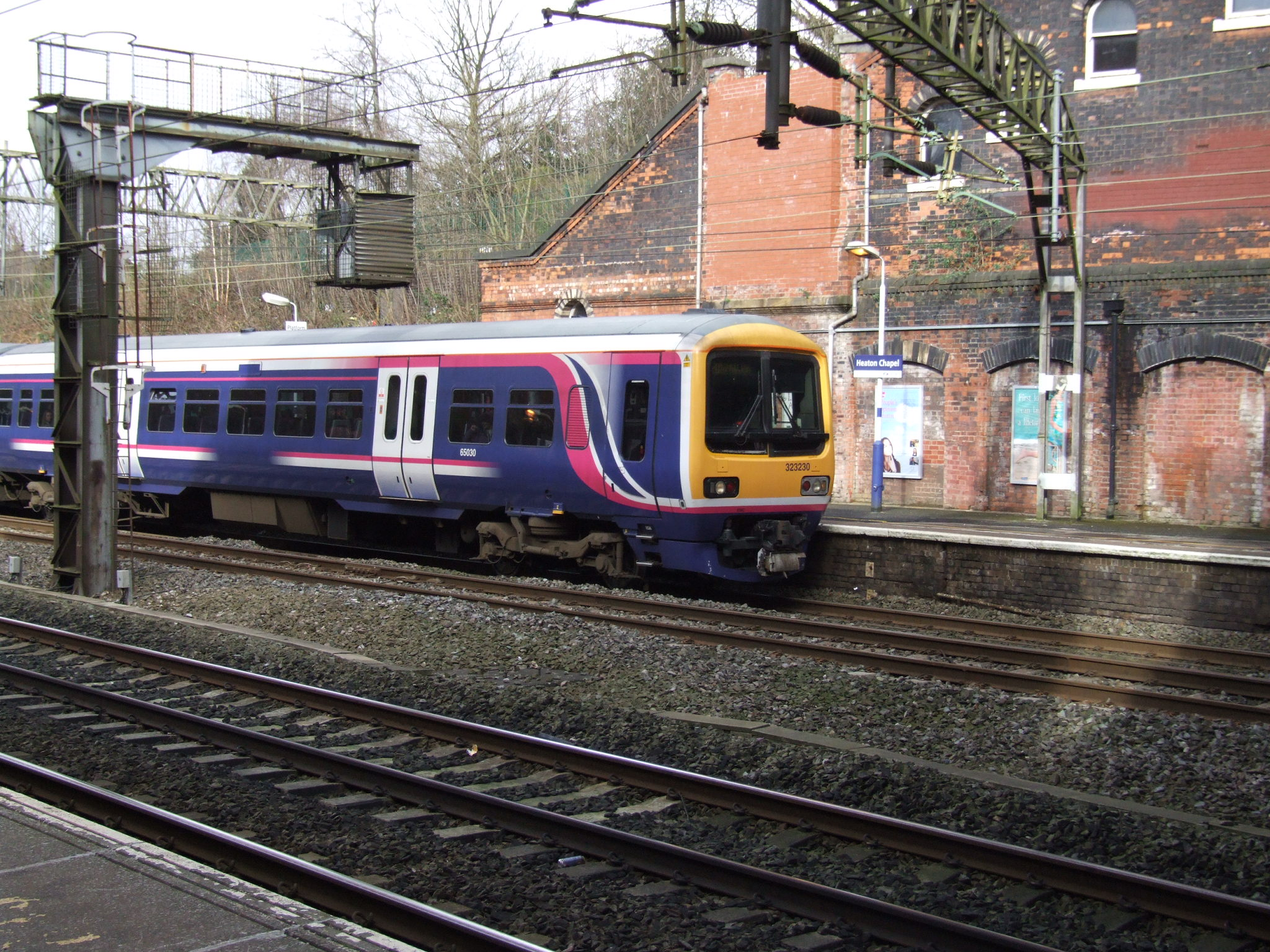
An electric multiple unit at Heaton Chapel railway station, on a local stopping service, 2008

Heaton Chapel railway station is a stop on the Crewe–Manchester line, the Stafford–Manchester line and the Buxton line. Northern Trains operates stopping services to Manchester Piccadilly, Stockport, Alderley Edge, Crewe, Stoke-on-Trent and Buxton.

Bus services are operated by Stagecoach Manchester; key routes include:

- 192 between Manchester, Stockport and Hazel Grove
- 7 between Manchester and Ashton-under-Lyne
- 42A between Manchester, East Didsbury and Reddish.

== Popular culture ==
Sir John Alcock, along with Arthur Whitten Brown, made the first non-stop transatlantic flight in 1919; he attended St. Thomas' primary school in Heaton Chapel alongside the church.

Heaton Chapel was the home of the Poco-a-Poco club; many big names performed here, including David Bowie on 27 April 1970. Sited at the junction of Denby Lane and Manchester Road, and formerly the Empress Cinema, this has now been demolished and has been home to the Hind's Head pub for a number of years.

== See also ==
- Listed buildings in Stockport
