= Stockport Viaduct =

Viaduct in Greater Manchester, England

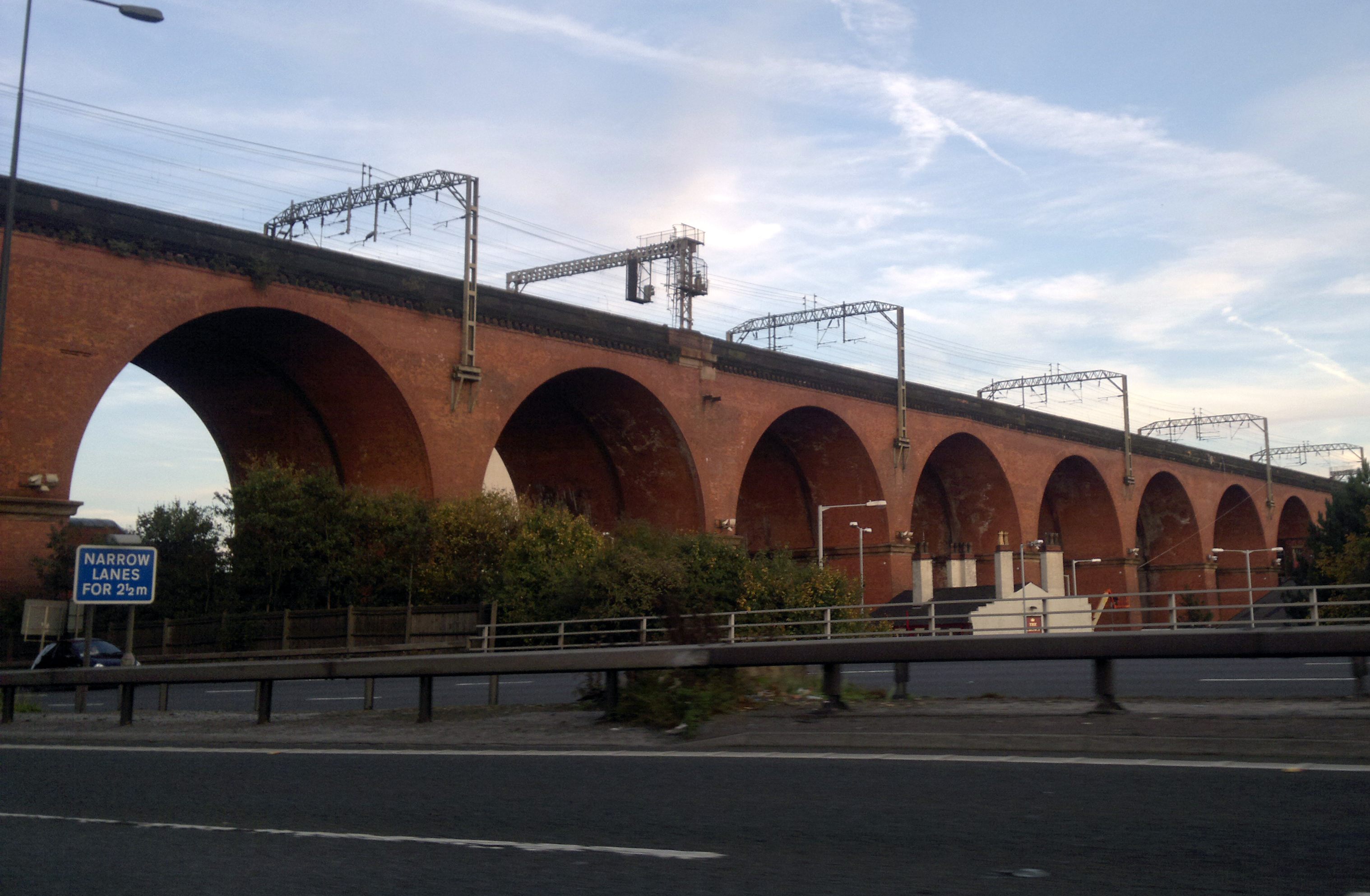
- The viaduct in 2012
- Coordinates: 53.4091°N 2.1642°W
- Carries: West Coast Main Line
- Crosses: River Mersey
- Locale: Stockport, Greater Manchester
- Official name: Stockport Viaduct
- Owner: Network Rail
- Maintained by: Network Rail
- Heritage status: Grade II* listed

Characteristics
- Design: Arch bridge
- Material: Brick
- Total length: 547.2 m (598.4 yd)
- Height: 111.1 ft (33.9 m) maximum
- No. of spans: 22

Rail characteristics
- No. of tracks: 4
- Track gauge: 1,435 mm (4 ft 8 1/2 in)
- Electrified: 25 kV 50 Hz AC OHLE

History
- Engineering design by: George W. Buck
- Construction start: March 1839; 187 years ago
- Construction end: December 1840; 185 years ago
- Construction cost: £72,000
- Opened: August 1842; 184 years ago

Location
- Interactive map of Stockport Viaduct

Stockport Viaduct, alternatively known as the Edgeley Viaduct, carries the West Coast Main Line (WCML) across the valley of the River Mersey in Stockport, Greater Manchester, England (grid reference SJ89089030). It is one of the largest brick structures in the United Kingdom and a major structure of the early railway age. It is immediately north of Stockport railway station.

The viaduct was designed by George W. Buck in consultation with the architect John Lowe for the Manchester and Birmingham Railway (M&BR). Work began in March 1839 and despite its scale and flooding from the Mersey, the viaduct was completed in December 1840 and services commenced the same month. Roughly 11 million bricks were used in its construction; at the time of its completion, it was the world's largest viaduct and a major feat of engineering. The viaduct is 33.85 metres (111.1 ft) high. (Note: cf. The Göltzsch Viaduct in eastern Germany.) Since March 1975, Stockport Viaduct has been a Grade II* listed structure; it remains one of the world's biggest brick structures.

Several alterations have been made to the viaduct, in the late 1880s it was widened to accommodate four tracks by the London and North Western Railway (LNWR). In the 1960s, overhead catenary lines were installed by British Rail for the West Coast Main Line electrification scheme. In the second half of the 20th century, the M60 motorway was built, passing through two of the viaduct's arches between Junction 1 (A5145 road) and Junction 27 (Portwood Roundabout). The viaduct has been subject to renovation and remedial repairs over the years.

== History ==
=== Background and construction ===
Stockport Viaduct was built to carry the Manchester and Birmingham Railway across the valley of the River Mersey at Stockport. The viaduct was designed by the engineer George W. Buck in consultation with the architect John Lowe. On 31 October 1838, the company's directors met to choose contractors from tenders that had been submitted. The contractors chosen were John Tomkinson and Samuel and John Holme and the work was overseen by the resident engineer W. Adams and subsequently by W. H. Perkins.

The plans for the viaduct differed from what was actually constructed, particularly in terms of its height. It was planned to be 23.8 metres (78 ft) high, but raised after it was realised that it would save £50,000 across the whole line. The viaduct stands 33.8 metres (111 ft) above the bed of the Mersey, is 546.2 metres (1,792 ft) long and as built, was 9.4 metres (31 ft) wide. The engine house of Wear Mill, built in 1831, was on the line of the railway and the viaduct was built over it by constructing the piers on either side of it.

On 10 March 1839, the viaduct's foundation stone was laid. At the peak of construction, around 600 workers were employed in shifts, working day and night. It took 21 months to complete using around 11 million common bricks and 11,300 cubic metres (400,000 cu ft) of stone and cost £72,000. Construction was hindered by floods in the Mersey which washed away the viaduct's centres on a couple of occasions early on in the work. On 21 December 1840, the final stone was set, marking its completion. Scaffolding and centring used to build the arches were reused in the construction of the Dane Viaduct 15 miles (24 km) to the south.

The viaduct comprises 22 semi-circular arches with spans of 19.2 metres (63 ft) flanked by a pair of abutment arches of 5.5-metre (18 ft) span. The arch rings are 900 millimetres (35 in) thick. The arches and spandrels are built of red brick set in lime mortar with ashlar spring courses. The deck parapets are 2.2 metres (7 ft 3 in) high. The distance between the arch crowns and the top of the parapets is 3.6 metres (12 ft). The red-brick piers are 3 metres (9.8 ft) thick and 12.2 metres (40 ft) high. They are solid up to 7.9 metres (26 ft) above the springings above which they have 685-millimetre (27 in) thick walls filled with ballast. The piers at the abutments have rusticated facings. The original trackbed was 8.7 metres (29 ft) wide, ballasted with sandstone taken from cuttings along the railway. The track is drained via 100-millimetre (3.9 in) diameter iron pipes through the piers.

=== Operational life ===
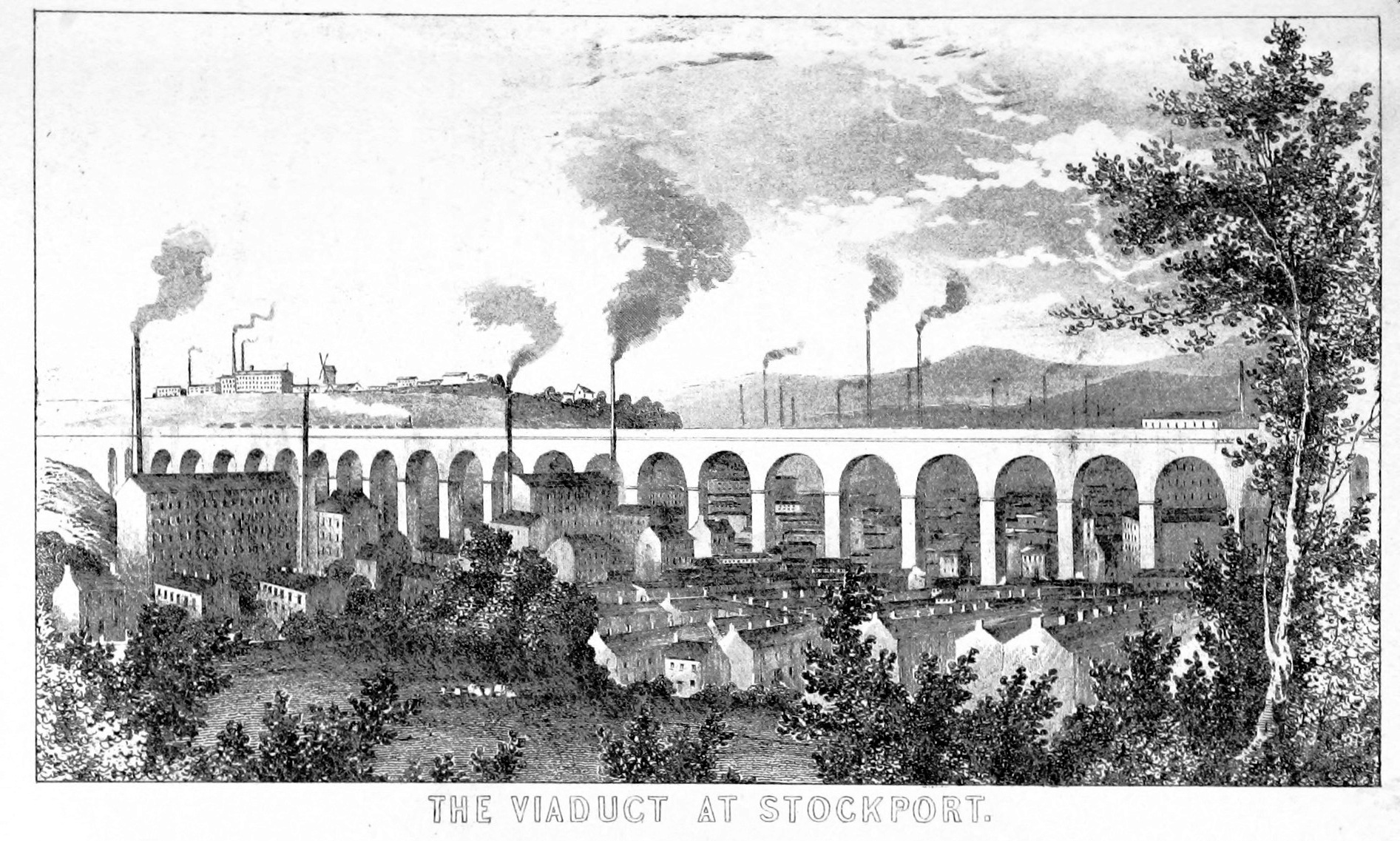
Stockport Viaduct illustrated, c. 1854

The Manchester–Stockport line was officially opened on 4 June 1840, but the viaduct was not completed until 21 December 1840. On 16 July 1841, the first train crossed the viaduct and it opened to rail traffic on 10 August 1842, enabling through services to Crewe and facilitating travel to London.

The first section of the Manchester and Birmingham line, from a temporary station in Travis Street, Manchester, to a temporary station at Heaton Norris on the Lancashire side of the Stockport Viaduct, opened on 4 June 1840 and carried nearly 2,000 passengers per day in the second half of that year. On 10 May 1842, train services were extended from Heaton Norris to Sandbach when Store Street in Manchester opened.

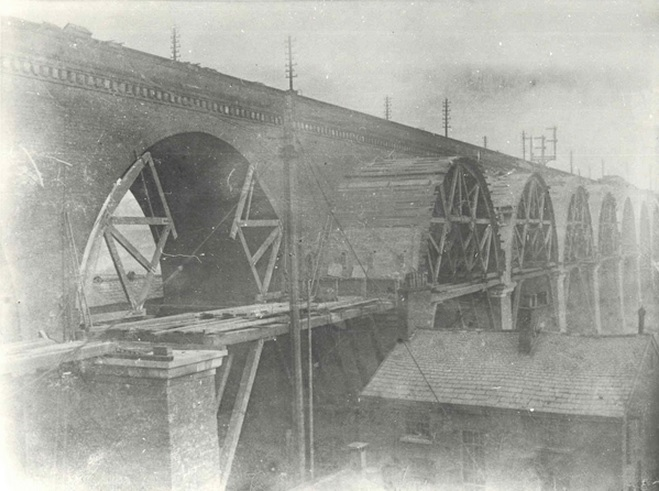
Work to widen Stockport Viaduct, c. 1888

Between 1887 and 1889, the viaduct was widened by approximately 6.8 metres (22 ft) along one side to accommodate two more tracks. The London and North Western Railway, formed in 1846, required a continuous four-track configuration along the route to enable express services to overtake slower trains. The engineer Francis Stephenson retained the original dimensions and form of the viaduct when it was widened. Additional tapered piers were built and another abutment arch to carry the wider deck was added at the Stockport end. The work was carried out by manual labour.

In 1929, the arch above Heaton Lane was repaired after several bricks fell from the soffit. The degraded condition of the brickwork was attributed to unseasonably high temperatures in the summers of 1915–1917 which had caused raising in the viaduct's track and parapet. Areas of damaged brickwork were replaced with reinforced concrete, the arch was re-grouted and steel rails were installed across the affected area.

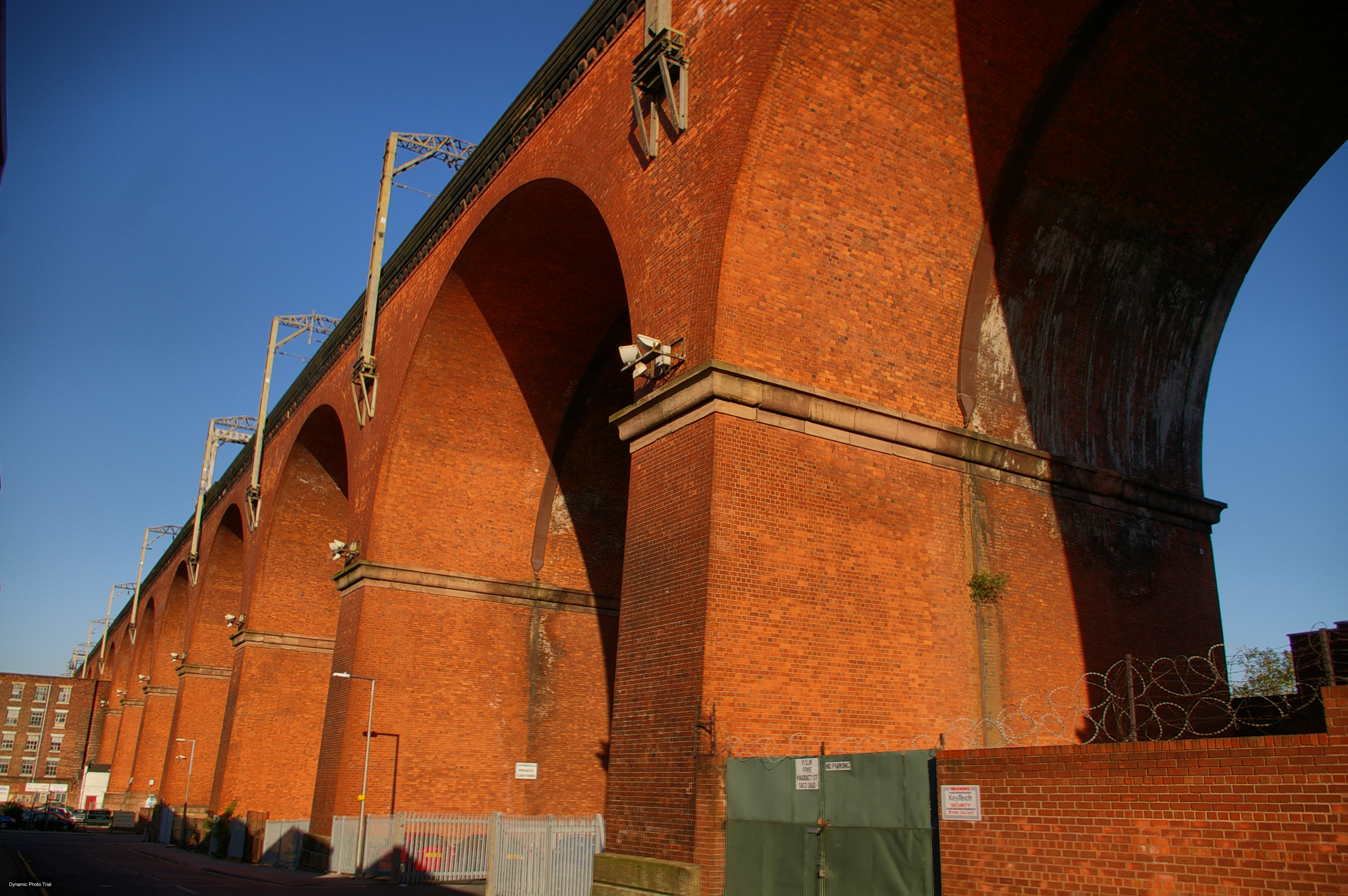
Street-level view of Stockport Viaduct in 2008. Note the presence of the overhead electrification gantries

In the 1960s, overhead catenary lines were installed for the West Coast Main Line electrification scheme. On 10 March 1975, the viaduct was granted Grade II* listed building status. In 1989, the viaduct was restored at an estimated cost of £3 million. The brickwork was cleaned to improve its appearance, and floodlights were installed to illuminate it at night time.

In the second half of the 20th century, the M60 motorway around Manchester was constructed. Its three-lane carriageways pass through two of the viaduct's arches between Junction 1 (A5145 road) and Junction 27 (Portwood Roundabout).

In late 2007, Stockport Metropolitan Borough Council (SMBC) objected to service changes by CrossCountry which proposed to reduce the number of Manchester to Birmingham trains stopping at Stockport by 50 per cent. Councillor David White claimed that an 1840 Act of Parliament guaranteed that all trains passing over the viaduct had to stop at Stockport station. In response, Labour MP Andrew Gwynne stated:

"Sadly no such Act of Parliament exists, although it is common currency in the town that it does. I made enquiries with the House of Commons Library and the Parliamentary Archives back at the time some intercity trains stopped using Stockport. It appears it is purely an urban myth."

In 2011, the viaduct was refurbished by Network Rail but by 2018, its condition had declined, limestone staining (likely caused by failing waterproofing measures) and graffiti were present in multiple areas; local authorities were reportedly considering legal action to compel Network Rail to address its condition.

The viaduct is mentioned in the introduction to the Northern Mill Towns in Elizabeth Gaskell's social novel North and South (1855). It has been portrayed in several works by artist L. S. Lowry.

== 1948 rail accident ==
An accident on the viaduct occurred on 30 November 1948 at 19:40 when, in darkness and thick fog, a Buxton train ran into the back of a Crewe and Disley train that was stopped at the signal at the south end of the viaduct waiting for a platform. Although the collision was at 10–15 mph, because of the inertial mass of four locomotives the last (11th) coach of the Crewe–Disley service telescoped into the 10th carriage. Five people were killed and 27 were seriously injured. The impact took place in approximately the centre of the viaduct. The inspector attributed the cause to the driver of the lead engine of the Buxton train, which was stopped at a signal just south of Heaton Norris railway station. He misinterpreted a shout from the assistant porter as having been from the guard giving permission to proceed, which the guard should have obtained from the signal box under Rule 55, as the signal was not visible in the dense fog. The train passed the signal at danger.

== See also ==
- Grade II* listed buildings in Greater Manchester
- Listed buildings in Stockport
- Malbork Castle – largest brick structure in the world
