= Stella Maris School =

School in Stockport, England

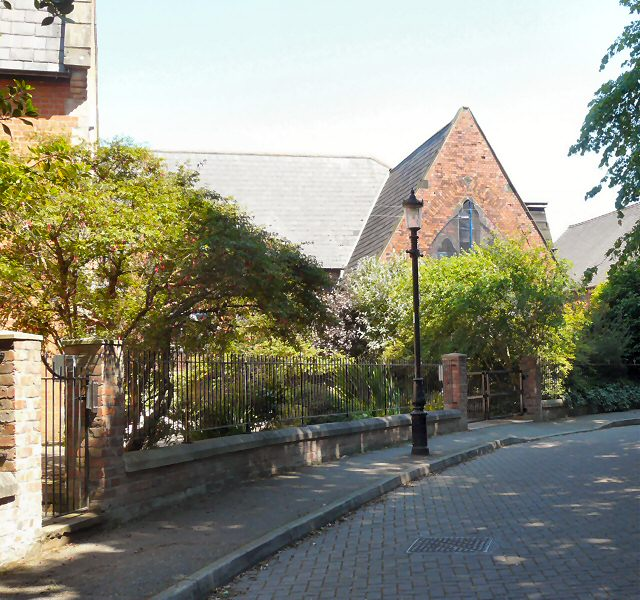

Location
- St John's Road; Heaton Mersey; Stockport, Greater Manchester, SK4 3BR; England; 53.41308°N 2.2064°W

Information
- Type: Other Independent School
- Motto: Where Successful Futures Begin
- Religious affiliation: Roman Catholic
- Established: December 1976
- Local authority: Stockport
- Department for Education URN: 106154 Tables
- Chair: Dr John Swarbrick
- Head teacher: Mrs Norah Johnson
- Gender: Co-educational
- Age: 3 to 11
- Website: stellamarisschool.co.uk

Listed Building – Grade II
- Official name: St John's Church of England Primary School
- Designated: 10 March 1975
- Reference no.: 1309412

Stella Maris School is a coeducational, independent school, in Heaton Mersey, Stockport, England. It was founded in December 1976.

The school is open to all denominations and is a non-profit making organisation. The school is registered with the Department for Education and Employment. It occupies a Victorian, Grade II listed building on St John's Road which was formerly St John's Church of England Primary School and has around 70 pupils from nursery to year 6, which makes the average class size 14 pupils or less.

The school has a number of notable former pupils, including historian and strategist Matthew Kay, and former world champion swimmer James Hickman.

The name "Stella Maris" is a Latin phrase meaning "Star of the Sea".
