= Heaton Mersey =

Suburb of Stockport, Greater Manchester, England

Coordinates: 53.413°N 2.207°W

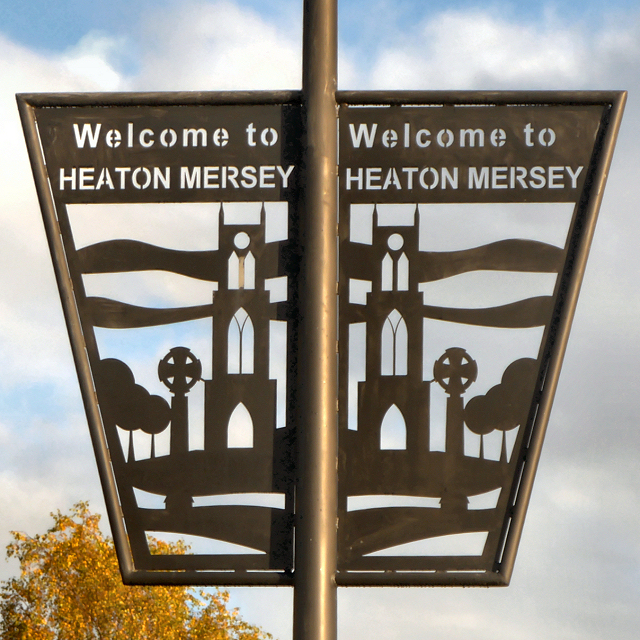

- Location within Greater Manchester
- Population: (2001 Census)
- OS grid reference: SJ865905
- Metropolitan borough: Stockport
- Metropolitan county: Greater Manchester
- Region: North West
- Country: England
- Sovereign state: United Kingdom
- Post town: STOCKPORT
- Postcode district: SK4
- Dialling code: 0161
- Police: Greater Manchester
- Fire: Greater Manchester
- Ambulance: North West
- UK Parliament: Stockport

Heaton Mersey is a suburb of Stockport, Greater Manchester, England. It is situated on the north-western border of Stockport, adjacent to Didsbury and Burnage which are in the City of Manchester.

The suburb is an affluent residential area and commuter zone of Manchester; part of it has been designated a conservation area to protect its heritage.

Heaton Mersey, together with its neighbouring suburbs, Heaton Norris, Heaton Chapel and Heaton Moor, are collectively known as the Four Heatons of Stockport.

== Geography ==
Within the boundaries of the historic county of Lancashire, Heaton Mersey lies on the north bank of the River Mersey, just a few miles downstream from its source in Stockport town centre. The river acts as a boundary between Heaton Mersey and the areas of Cheadle Heath and Cheadle Village. Heaton Mersey is also bordered by the City of Manchester, by the following areas; East Didsbury to the west, Burnage to the north-west. Within the direct vicinity the other areas within Stockport are; Heaton Moor to the north/north-east and Heaton Norris to the east.

Heaton Mersey overlooks the Cheshire Plain, which can be clearly seen from the top part of Heaton Mersey park off Didsbury Road. At the bottom lies the valley of the River Mersey, where Heaton Mersey Bleachworks was situated (now demolished) as well as a business and industrial estate. Mersey Vale nature reserve and two ponds are also found here, one being a club-owned fishing pond. Just off Didsbury Road, opposite Heaton Mersey village, lies Heaton Mersey Bowl which is a large depression in the ground used as open green space.

Heaton Mersey Common, which is another local nature reserve with fields and woodland, is situated next to the former Cranford Golf range. It, too, contains a large pond.

Out of the four Heatons, Heaton Mersey has the most green space by area and is the only to be situated on a river or contain any substantial water body.

== History ==
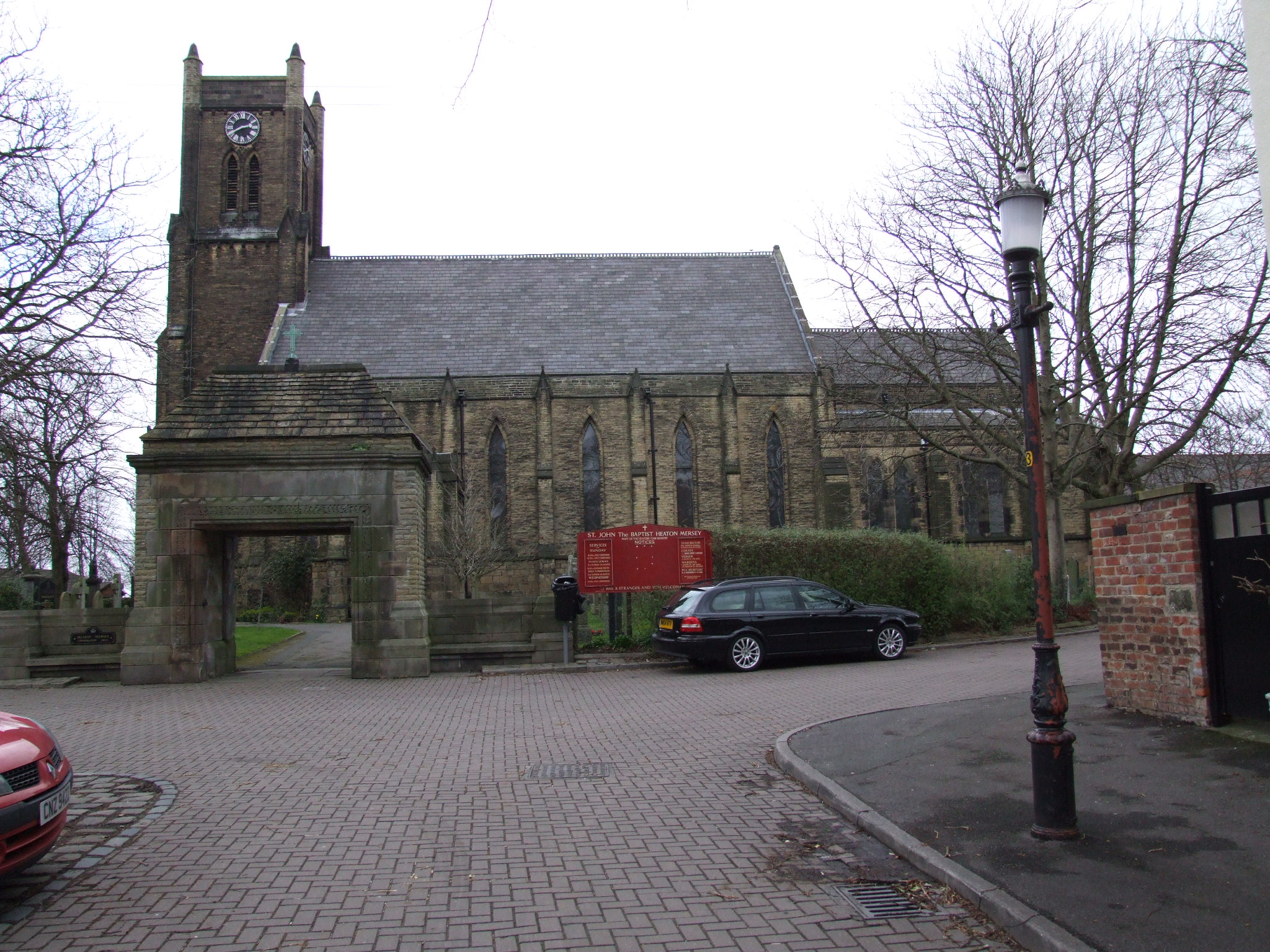
St John's church. Its broach spire was removed around 1990. The settlement of Heaton Mersey is rooted in the local industry which developed in the late 18th and 19th centuries. Prior to this, the area was agricultural, with small hamlets along the route between Stockport and Didsbury.

Three of these hamlets, Grundy Hill, Top O' Th' Bank, and Parrs Fold eventually formed modern Heaton Mersey.

The main industrial change for the Heaton Mersey area was the development of the Upper and Lower Bleachworks. The first works were built by the industrialist Samuel Oldknow, and his brother, on the north bank of the River Mersey in 1785. Oldknow's influence had already been felt in other areas of Stockport, best known for industrial and canal building activities in Marple and Mellor.

Activities at the Bleachworks included the bleaching, dyeing and printing of cloth. The lower works had a five-storey spinning mill and extensive weaving shed, in addition to the bleachcroft and reservoirs to the east of the site. The upper works were built soon after the textile recession of 1793. The sites passed into the hands of several further owners after Oldknow.

Some housing was built as a consequence of the industry, such as the Barracks Square dwellings, where many young apprentices inhabited. Much of the housing has however since been demolished.

A number of villas were built beyond the main industrial village, and by the 1830s, Heaton Mersey was becoming a fashionable suburb among the industrial elite. Local churches opened in the 1840s and 1850s, the population grew significantly between the 1850s and 1880s, and the railway line from Tiviot Dale in Stockport extended out to Heaton Mersey and beyond into other southern Manchester suburbs (see below).

The railway station was demolished, as well as the Bleachworks themselves.

== Transport ==
=== Buses ===
Bus services in Heaton Mersey are operated primarily by Stagecoach Manchester along the main thoroughfare, the A5145 Didsbury Road. Routes connect the suburb with Didsbury, Chorlton, the Trafford Centre, Altrincham and Piccadilly Gardens.

=== Roads ===
Road connections are available via the A5145 to the A34 at Parrs Wood and the A6 at Stockport. The M60 Manchester orbital motorway is also accessible at junctions 1, 2 and 3.

=== Trams ===
Local buses allow for connections to Manchester Metrolink at nearby East Didsbury tram stop, which is the southern terminus of a route to Rochdale, via the city centre.

=== Railway ===
The nearest National Rail stations are at:

- East Didsbury, on the Styal Line, for Northern services between Manchester Airport and Manchester Piccadilly.
- Stockport, which is sited on the West Coast Main Line between London Euston and Manchester Piccadilly; services on this line are operated by Avanti West Coast. There are also direct services to most regions of the country.

==== History ====
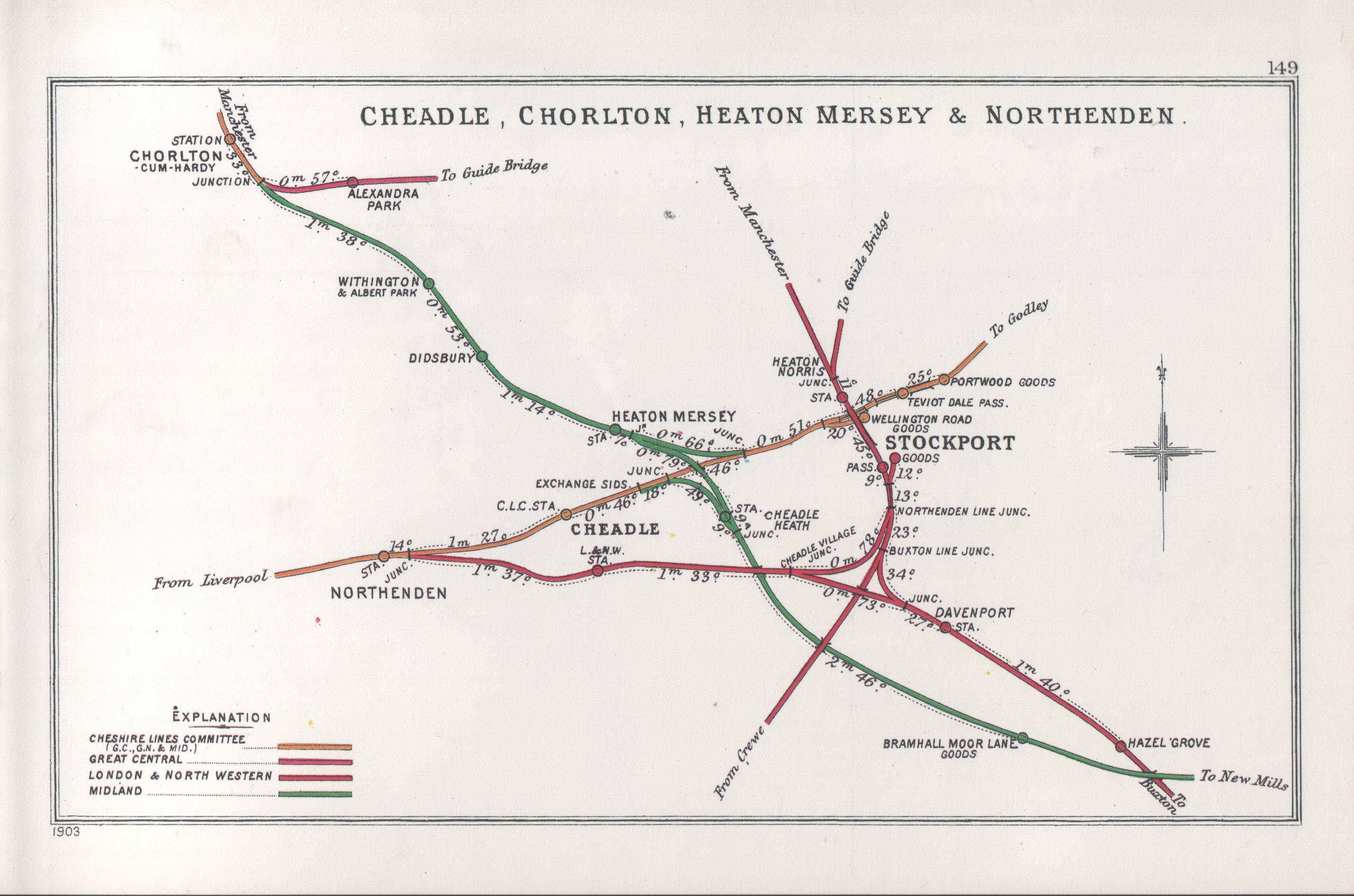
Cheadle, Chorlton, Heaton Mersey & Northenden railways in the early 20th century

The suburb was once served by its own station; Heaton Mersey railway station was open between 1 January 1880 until 3 July 1961. It was built by the Midland Railway and was situated on the line from Cheadle Heath to Manchester Central. The station was situated in a cutting at the southern end of Station Road; it was demolished and filled-in shortly after its closure. The extension to Station Road, connecting it to the western end of Craig Road so as to create access for residential development, ran parallel to the old track bed of the Midland line from Stockport Tiviot Dale; this part of the route is now a footpath.

Whilst nearly all of the original railway structure has long been removed, small sections of previous railway bridges remain. One structure exists where Vale Road and Craig Road meet and the former bridge section acts as a retaining wall. Two other sections can be seen either side of the River Mersey upstream of the weir and opposite the nearby farm.

From January 1889 until 4 May 1968, there was a steam locomotive depot named Heaton Mersey TMD, coded 9F. It lay on the north bank of the Mersey and was reached by a footbridge, still extant, leading from Gorsey Bank Road.

== Education ==
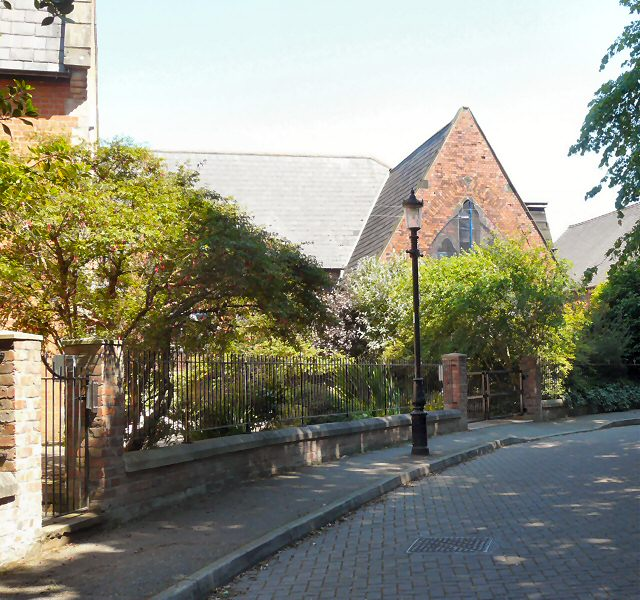
Stella Maris School

Schools include the primary schools: Tithe Barn, Didsbury Road, Mersey Vale and Saint Winifred's RC Primary School, famous for St Winifred's School Choir and chart hits in the 1980s, all rated outstanding; other schools include Stella Maris School, an independent primary school, and St. John's Church of England, which are both rated good. The local comprehensive is Priestnall School, formerly rated outstanding, however dropping to a requires improvement rating in 2019. Pre-schools are Freshfield (rated good), Didsbury Road and Mersey Vale.

== Community facilities ==
The area has a Sea Scout base on Didsbury Road, with beaver scouts, cub scouts and sea scouts currently active. It also hosts regular harvest farmer's markets, car boot sales and family fun days. The Moorfest music festival was held at the Heaton Mersey Bowl in 2005, which included appearances from Badly Drawn Boy and Howard Marks. Local attractions include the River Mersey, around which there is a nature park and trail. Heaton Mersey Common with its several pubs, delis, restaurants and shops supply the local amenities to the area. Heaton Mersey Park has a local fishing pond and further down station road is day-ticket fishing pond. Heaton Mersey Sports and Social Club, on Harwood Road, is currently the home of Heaton Mersey Village Cricket Club.

== In media ==
The Stockport-based band Blossoms used Heaton Mersey Bowl and the adjacent Vale Close to film sections of the music video for the song "Honey Sweet".

== Notable people ==
- Tom Chorlton (1880–1947), Liverpool F.C footballer.
- Michael Keane (born 11 January 1993), Everton F.C. footballer.
- Will Keane (born 11 January 1993), Wigan Athletic and Republic of Ireland national footballer.
- Sally Lindsay (born 8 July 1973), actress known for her role as Shelley Unwin in Coronation Street.

== See also ==
- Listed buildings in Stockport
