= Joseph Chessborough Dyer =

English divine

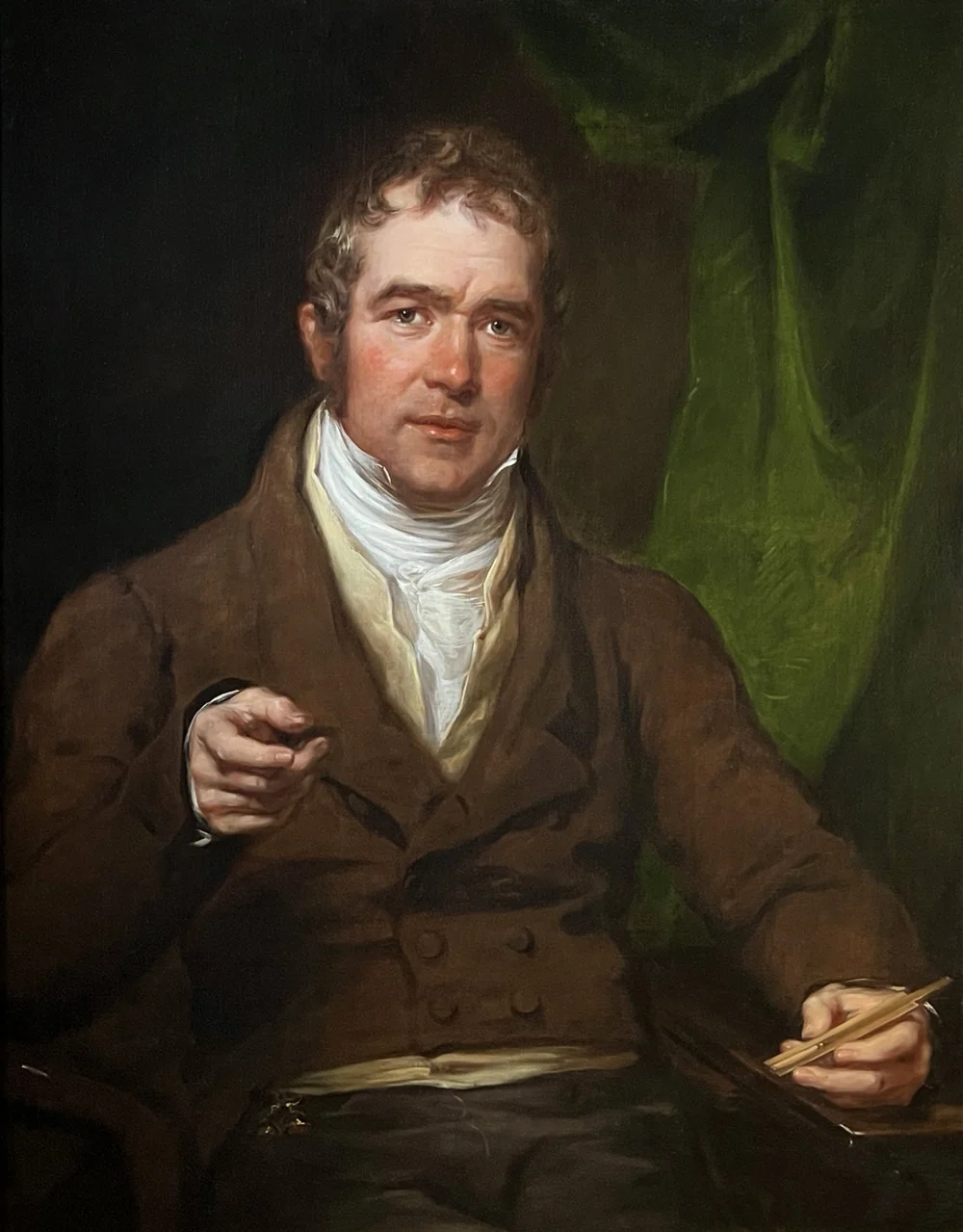
- Born: November 15, 1780; Stonnington Point, Connecticut, U.S.
- Died: May 3, 1871 (aged 90); Manchester, England
- Occupation: Inventor

Joseph Chessborough Dyer (November 15, 1780 – May 3, 1871) was an American inventor.

== Biography ==
Dyer was the son of Captain Nathaniel Dyer of the Rhode Island navy. He was born at Stonnington Point, Connecticut, on November 15, 1780. He was educated at the common school of Opdike's Newtown, now called Wickford, Rhode Island. His mother died from hardships she underwent during the storming and burning of New London under Benedict Arnold. Dyer had a turn for mechanics, and when quite a lad constructed an unsinkable lifeboat, in which he and his father took excursions along the coast. At the age of sixteen he entered the counting-house of a French refugee named Nancrède, to part of whose business he subsequently succeeded. He first came to England in 1802, and was frequently in the country from that date until his final settlement there in 1811, when he married Ellen Jones, daughter of Somerset Jones of Gower Street, London. Thenceforward he devoted himself to mechanics, and was active in introducing into England several American inventions, which became exceedingly profitable to him and others. One of the first of these was Jacob Perkins's plan for steel-engraving (1809); then followed fur-shearing and nail-making machines (1810), and the carding engine (1811). Robert Fulton sent him drawings and specifications of his steamboat in 1811, and Dyer experienced many difficulties and discouragements in bringing the system into use in England. In 1825 he took out his first patent for a roving frame used in cotton-spinning, invented by Danforth and subsequently much improved and simplified by himself. He lived at Camden Town until 1816, when he settled in Manchester. He was associated with William Tudor in founding the North American Review (1815), of which the first four numbers were written by Tudor and himself. He was also concerned in the foundation of the Manchester Guardian in 1821. In 1830 he was a member of a delegation to Paris to take the contributions from the town of Manchester for the relief of the wounded in the July Revolution, and to congratulate Louis-Philippe on his accession. It was claimed that he, as chairman of the Reform League, was instrumental in procuring the prompt recognition of the French king by the British government. He aided in establishing the Royal Institution and the Mechanics' Institution at Manchester; and was one of the original directors of the ill-fated Bank of Manchester, which, after a few years of great prosperity, came by fraud and neglect to a disastrous end, whereby Dyer lost no less than 98,000l.

He engaged in the struggle for parliamentary reform and in the promotion of the Liverpool and Manchester Railway, and in later years was closely associated with the Anti-Cornlaw League, both in its formation and operations. In 1832 he established machine-making works at Gamaches, Somme, France, which were given up in 1848, having, through mismanagement on the part of an agent, entailed great loss on Dyer.

After the death of his wife in 1842, and when he had relinquished his extensive machine works at Manchester (afterwards carried on by Parr, Curtis, & Madeley), he resided with one or other of his sons, and occupied himself with science, literature, and politics. He contributed to various journals and read a number of papers before the Manchester Literary and Philosophical Society on physics, on political science, and on the origin of certain mechanical inventions. In these last he referred chiefly to the inventions he had himself been instrumental in introducing or developing.

In 1819 he published "Specimens and Description of Perkins's and Fairman's Patent Siderographic Plan to Prevent Forgery (of Bank Notes)," and in 1850 a pamphlet entitled "Remarks on Education." He cherished a strong hatred of slavery, and wrote several interesting pamphlets on the subject, both prior to and during the American Civil War. They were:

- "Notes on the Legalised Reclamation of Fugitive Slaves from the Free States of America," 1857. *"Democracy," 1859.
- "Notes on the Slave-holders' Mission to England," 1860.
- "Notes on Political Mistakes," 1862.
- "Letter to William H. Seward," 1862. A few months prior to his death he wrote a treatise on "Longevity, by a Nonagenarian," but the manuscript was lost at a publisher's.

He died at Manchester on May 3, 1871, aged 90. His son, Frederick N. Dyer, was author of "The Slave Girl, a Poetical Tale," London, 1848, 8vo, and "The Step-son, a Novel," 2 vols., 1854, 12mo. His youngest son, Wilson Dyer (who died in 1867), was an artist.

Mauldeth Hall was built for Joseph Chessborough Dyer but he only lived there a short time.
