= Nursery Inn =

Listed pub in Stockport, Greater Manchester, England

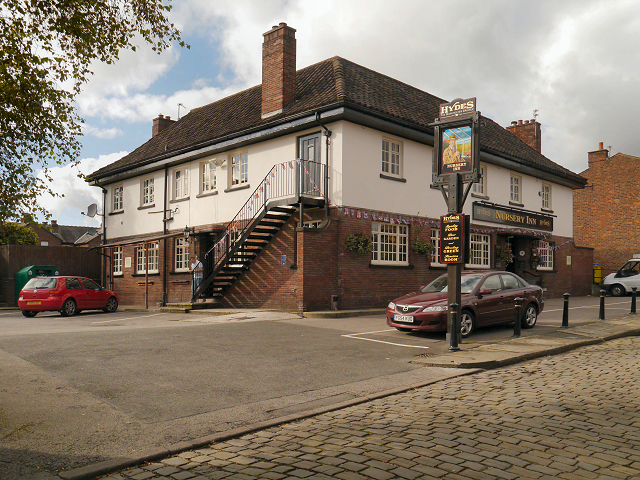
- The pub in 2012

- Location within Greater Manchester

General information
- Architectural style: Sub-Georgian
- Location: 258 Green Lane, Heaton Norris, Stockport, Greater Manchester, England
- Coordinates: 53.4149°N 2.1769°W
- Year built: 1939; 87 years ago
- Renovated: 2024 (refurbished)
- Owner: Hydes Brewery

Design and construction
- Designations

Listed Building – Grade II
- Official name: The Nursery Inn
- Designated: 22 December 2011
- Reference no.: 1401250

Website
- Official website

The Nursery Inn is a Grade II listed public house on Green Lane in Heaton Norris, a suburb of Stockport, Greater Manchester, England. Built in 1939 to replace an earlier pub on the site, it takes its name from a former plant nursery nearby. It has a multi‑room interior of recognised historic importance, rated three stars by the Campaign for Real Ale (CAMRA), and was CAMRA's National Pub of the Year in 2001. The pub is operated by Hydes Brewery and was refurbished in 2024.

== History ==
The building was constructed in 1939 in a sub-Georgian design with a multi-room layout, as a replacement of a 19th-century pub that had been on the site. Its name is believed to have been taken from a plant nursery that was located nearby.

The Nursery Inn was named as the Campaign for Real Ale (CAMRA)'s National Pub of the Year for 2001.

On 22 December 2011, the Nursery Inn was designated a Grade II listed building. The interior is recognised by CAMRA with a three‑star rating in its National Inventory of Historic Pub Interiors, indicating its status as of "outstanding national historic importance". The pub is currently run by Hydes Brewery, which oversaw refurbishment of the interior and exterior in 2024.

== Architecture ==
=== Exterior ===
The building is constructed in brick with a rendered finish on the upper floor and a tiled roof, with tall chimneys rising from it. The main door on the east side opens into a small lobby used for drinking. From here, lounges can be reached at the front and back, both linked to a central bar, and there is direct access through to the bowling green behind the building. Stairs from the lobby lead to an upper landing that gives access to a function room, an outdoor terrace, and the manager's living quarters. A second entrance on the south side leads directly into the vault and a former off‑sales counter, both served by the same central bar.

The building is almost square in shape, with two full-depth fronts and regular window openings: five upstairs at the front and six along the side. The windows are metal-framed with small panes. The roof slopes on all sides and has wide eaves and tall chimneys. At the back, the centre section is one storey, creating space for a terrace above; the ground floor here projects slightly with a wide curved window overlooking the bowling green. There are three public entrances—front, side and rear—each with a canopy typical of the 1930s. The larger rear canopy and the metal fire escape on the side are later additions and not of particular note.

=== Interior ===
The interior is arranged around a central bar that serves every room, including the drinking lobby, and still has a hatch to the former off‑sales area. Above the counters runs a band of decorative glazed panels showing a stylised 1930s bar scene, said to be printed on silk. The drinking lobby has terrazzo on the floor and lower walls, though some of it is now hidden by later coverings. Original features here include the 1930s staircase, globe light fittings, toilet signage, and inner doors to the rear with stained glass, while the ceiling is deeply coved, as in the other public rooms; the inner front doors are modern additions.

The front lounge has timber panelling to picture‑rail height, fitted seating with bell pushes, small glazed screens by the doorway, a 1930s brick fireplace, and windows with stained glass showing gardening motifs, with ceiling lights hung on chains. The rear lounge also has fitted seating with bell pushes and a small glazed screen, along with more stained glass with plant themes. Its ceiling lights appear original but differ from those in the front lounge, and the cast‑iron and tiled fireplace is a later replacement set within an original timber surround with a mirrored overmantel.

The vault has panelling behind the bench seating, a short glazed screen near the entrance, a tiled fireplace, and a ceiling light matching those in the drinking lobby. A glazed timber partition runs between the bar and the entrance, forming the enclosure for the former off‑sales counter, which is reached from a small lobby. Most of the toilets retain terrazzo floors and high‑level tiling, with original urinals in the gents', except for the downstairs ladies', which has been modernised. Upstairs, the function room has been largely refitted, but the rest of the floor keeps its original woodwork and signage.

== Stockport County F.C. connection ==
The Nursery Inn was one of the first headquarters of Stockport County F.C. (founded as Heaton Norris Rovers in 1883), when the club's ground was nearby.

In August 2025, the pub and its bowling green served as the location to promote Stockport County's third kit for their 2025–26 season, with the original Heaton Norris Rovers historical crest.

== See also ==
- Listed buildings in Stockport
- Listed pubs in Greater Manchester
