= Heaton Norris railway station =

Former railway station in Greater Manchester, England

Heaton Norris

General information
- Location: Heaton Norris, Stockport, England
- Coordinates: 53.41282°N 2.16854°W
- Grid reference: SJ888907

Other information
- Status: Disused

History
- Original company: Manchester and Birmingham Railway (M&BR)
- Pre-grouping: London and North Western Railway (LNWR)
- Post-grouping: London, Midland and Scottish Railway (LMS)

Key dates
- 4 June 1840: Opened as Stockport
- 10 May 1842: Renamed Heaton Norris
- 2 March 1959: Closed
Location

Heaton Norris railway station, which was located in Heaton Norris, served the town of Stockport, in Cheshire (now Greater Manchester), England. It opened in 1840 and was closed in 1959.

== History ==
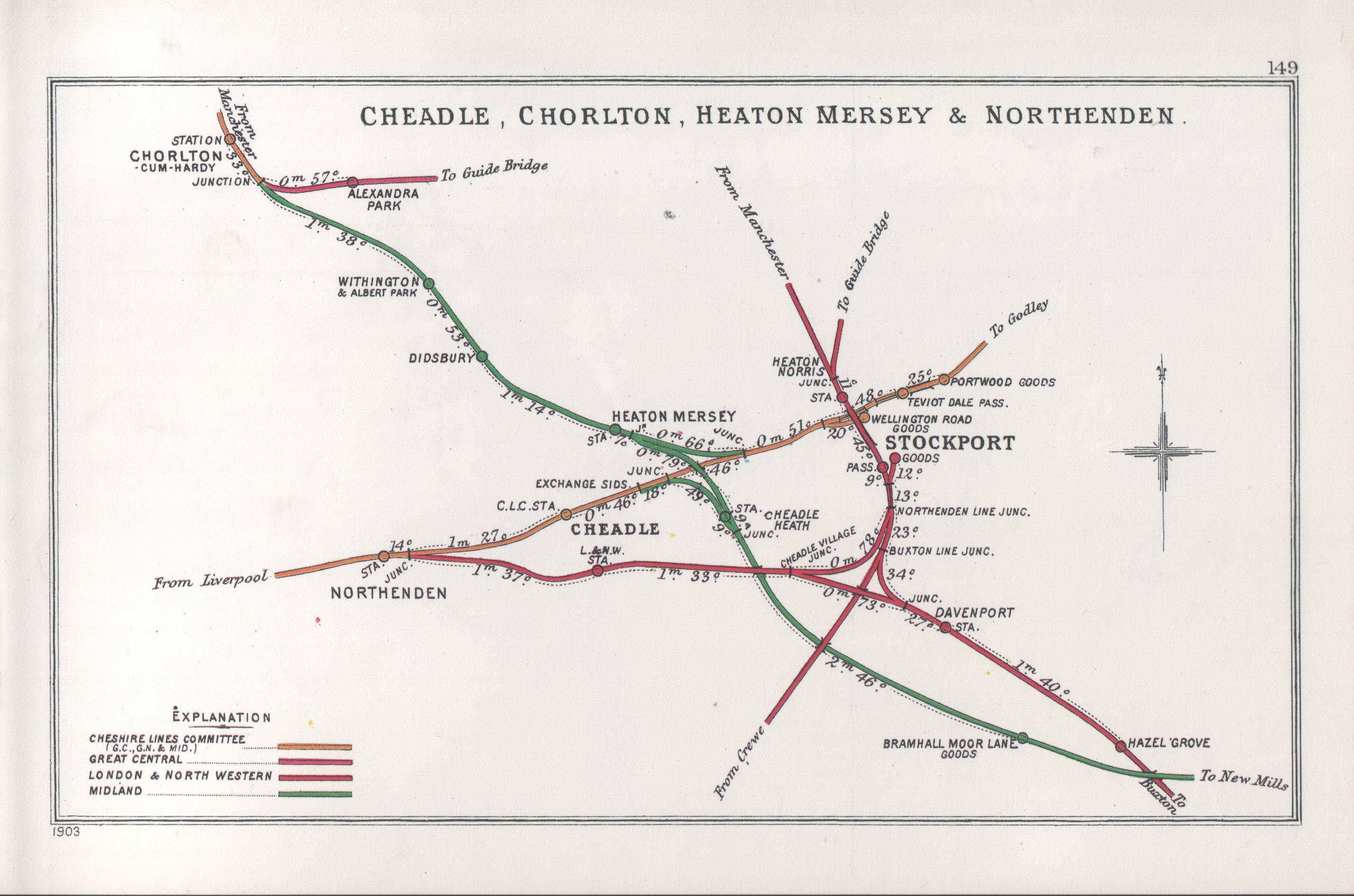
A 1903 Railway Clearing House diagram showing local routes

The Manchester and Birmingham Railway (M&BR) opened in stages from Manchester and reached the north of Stockport in 1840. The 5.5-mile (9 km) line ran from a temporary station in Manchester to Heaton Norris station, at the north end of the uncompleted Stockport Viaduct. The temporary station, which was later renamed Heaton Norris, was Stockport's only station for over two years.

After the viaduct was completed, the M&BR built a station at its southern end as an experiment. The decision was prompted by complaints that the first station was a long way from the industrial parts of town and even further from the residential districts on the south side. The second station opened on 15 February 1843 as Edgeley. By 1844, it became the town's primary station.

Heaton Norris station, which lay at the north end of the viaduct, was closed in 1959.

== Routes ==
Preceding station	Historical railways	Following station
Stockport Edgeley; Line and station open	LNWR; Manchester and Birmingham Railway	Heaton Chapel; Line and station open
Stockport Edgeley; Line and station open	LNWR; Stockport–Stalybridge line	Reddish South; Line and station open

== The site today ==
The station has since been demolished, although the West Coast Main Line continues to run through the site. The railway warehouse remains extant, on the north bank of the River Mersey.
