= Heaton Chapel railway station =

Railway station in Greater Manchester, England

Coordinates: 53.4259°N 2.1793°W

Heaton Chapel
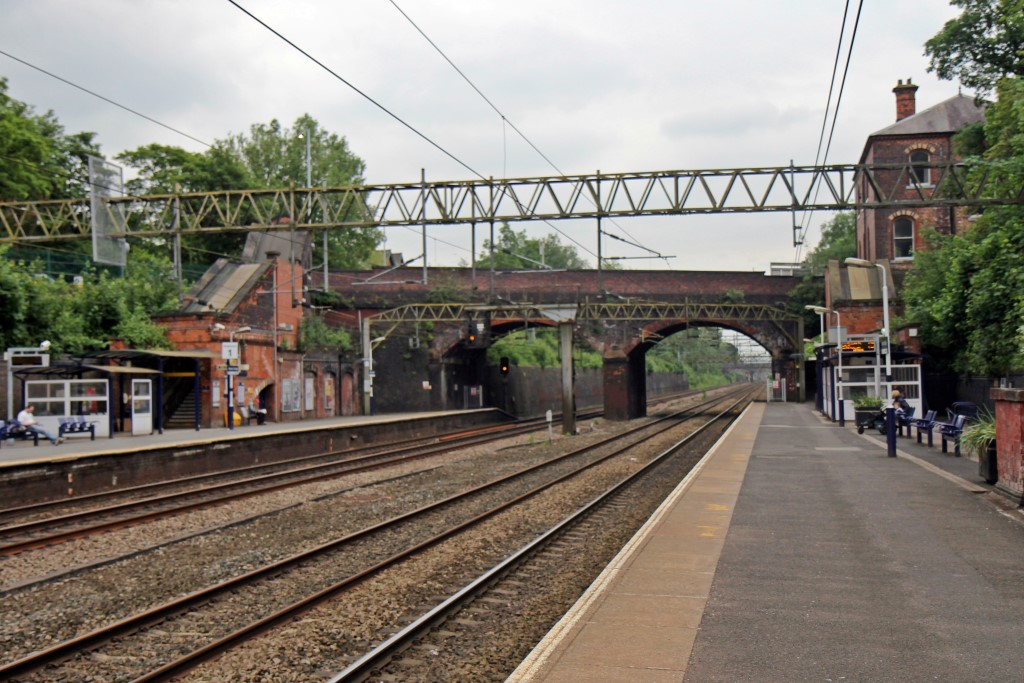
- Heaton Chapel railway station in 2014

General information
- Location: Heaton Moor Road, Heaton Chapel; England
- Grid reference: SJ881921
- Owner: Network Rail
- Operator: Northern Trains
- Transit authority: Transport for Greater Manchester
- Platforms: 2
- Tracks: 4
- Train operators: Northern Trains

Other information
- Station code: HTC
- Classification: DfT category E
- Website: nationalrail.co.uk

History
- Opened: 1852
- Electrified: 1960
- Former names: Heaton Chapel & Heaton Moor
- Pre-grouping: LNWR
- Pre-nationalisation: LMS

Passengers
- 2020/21: ▼0.123 million
- 2021/22: ▲0.413 million
- 2022/23: ▲0.480 million
- 2023/24: ▲0.558 million
- 2024/25: ▲0.623 million
Location
Notes
- Passenger statistics from the Office of Rail and Road

Heaton Chapel railway station serves the Heaton Chapel and Heaton Moor districts of Stockport, Greater Manchester, England. It is 4 1/2 miles (7.2 km) south of Manchester Piccadilly towards Stockport. It opened as Heaton Chapel & Heaton Moor in 1852 by the London and North Western Railway (LNWR). It was renamed Heaton Chapel by British Rail on 6 May 1974.

== Facilities ==
The station has a ticket office; when the ticket office is closed access to the Manchester-bound platform is only possible via a ramp from Tatton Road South.

In May 2016, the roof collapsed onto the stairs of the Manchester-bound platform. This resulted in the stairs being closed on both platforms, leaving access only via long ramps to the platforms. The roof has now been repaired and reinstated.

== Services ==
On Mondays to Saturdays, Heaton Chapel is typically served by the following Northern Trains services:

- 1 train per hour (tph) each way between Crewe and Manchester Piccadilly, on the Crewe–Manchester line
- 1 tph each way between Alderley Edge and Piccadilly, on the Crewe–Manchester line
- 1 tph each way between Buxton and Piccadilly, on the Buxton line
- 1 tph each way between Hazel Grove and Piccadilly, on the Buxton line.

On Sundays, the service is reduced to one train per hour towards Buxton and an irregular service towards Manchester Piccadilly.

Preceding station	National Rail	Following station
Stockport	Northern Trains Crewe–Manchester line Monday to Saturday	Levenshulme
Stockport	Northern Trains Buxton line	Levenshulme
