= Manchester and Birmingham Railway =

Former English railway company

Overview
- Dates of operation: 1840–1846
- Successor: London and North Western Railway

Technical
- Track gauge: 4 ft 8 1/2 in (1,435 mm)
- Previous gauge: 4 ft 9 in (1,448 mm)

The Manchester and Birmingham Railway (M&BR) was built between Manchester and Crewe and opened in stages from 1840. Between Crewe and Birmingham, trains were worked by the Grand Junction Railway. The M&BR was merged into the London and North Western Railway in 1846.

== History ==
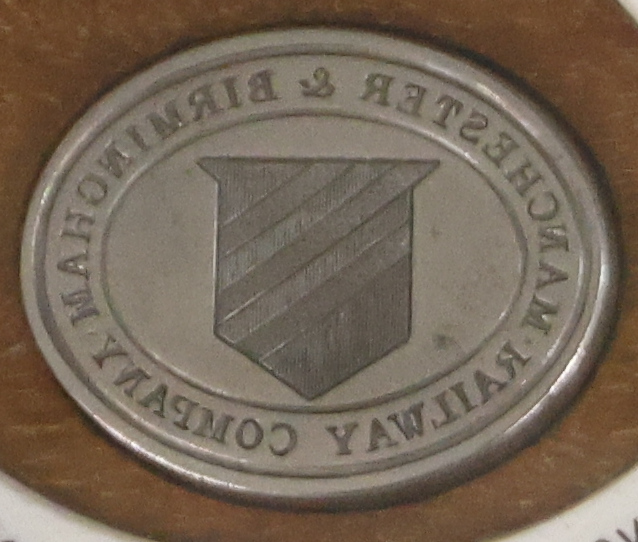
Seal of the Manchester and Birmingham Railway company

=== Plans ===
After the building of the Grand Junction Railway (GJR) and the Liverpool and Manchester Railway, investors began to look for other routes south of Manchester. From 1835, the GJR was considering a branch to the Staffordshire Potteries, while the Manchester and Cheshire Junction Railway was planning a line from Manchester to Crewe with branches outwards. Meanwhile, George Stephenson was investigating a line from Manchester and Stockport to the Potteries, which developed into a proposal for a "Manchester South Union Railway". Also involved were proposals for competing lines through the Trent valley to Rugby.

Manchester and Birmingham Railway Act 1837
- Act of Parliament
- Parliament of the United Kingdom
- Long title: An Act for making a Railway from Manchester to join the Grand Junction Railway in the Parish of Chebsey in the County of Stafford, to be called "The Manchester and Birmingham Railway," with certain Branches therefrom.
- Citation: 7 Will. 4 & 1 Vict. c. lxix

Dates
- Royal assent: 30 June 1837

Other legislation
- Repealed by: London and North Western Railway Act 1846

Status: Repealed

After two years of proposals and counter-proposals, what emerged was a scheme to run from a junction from the GJR at Chebsey, with branches to Macclesfield and Crewe, into Manchester Store Street, which received an act of Parliament, the Manchester and Birmingham Railway Act 1837 (7 Will. 4 & 1 Vict. c. lxix) authorising it in 1837. There were plans to take the line to Rugby, but for a number of reasons, including lack of finance, they were put in abeyance.

=== Opening ===
A section between Heaton Norris and a temporary station at Travis Street in Manchester was opened first in 1840 carrying nearly two thousand passengers in the first twenty weeks. However, there still remained to be built an enormous 22 arch viaduct over the River Mersey at Stockport. In 1841 the Sheffield, Ashton-under-Lyne and Manchester Railway, which was to share Store Street, also began running into Travis Street. Store Street finally opened in 1842 and later became known as London Road (it became Piccadilly in 1960). Services were extended to Sandbach but entry to Crewe, where it would use GJR metals to Birmingham, proved more difficult. In the end it was agreed that the GJR would work the trains south of Crewe, while the M&BR would work them into Manchester.

Enough locomotives, all 2-2-2, had been ordered from Robert Stephenson and Company and Sharp, Roberts and Company to work the whole distance, but John Ramsbottom, their Locomotive Superintendent, managed to sell four of them on to the South Eastern Railway. Although the company's finances remained weak, it built a number of short branches, and, although a minor player, its position made it a crucial part in revived plans for the Trent and Churnet valleys, which involved the London and Birmingham Railway with which they would compete.

=== Merger ===
Eventually the complex relationship between the M&BR, the GJR and the L&BR was resolved by their merger in 1846 to form the London and North Western Railway (LNWR). The long-awaited Trent Valley Railway opened in 1847. The Manchester and Birmingham had put other plans forward, including a line from Rugby to the Midland Railway at Syston near Leicester, authorised in 1846 and the Coventry and Nuneaton Railway. Also in 1846 the Manchester, Buxton, Matlock and Midlands Junction Railway had been authorised, supported strongly by the M&BR and the Midland, joining the latter's line to London. In the event it only reached Rowsley due to financial difficulties, but the merger was a considerable embarrassment to the Midland, since the LNWR was naturally opposed to a competing line to the capital.

== Locomotives of the M&BR ==
The M&BR's locomotive works was at Longsight railway station.

== Prestbury Tunnel ==
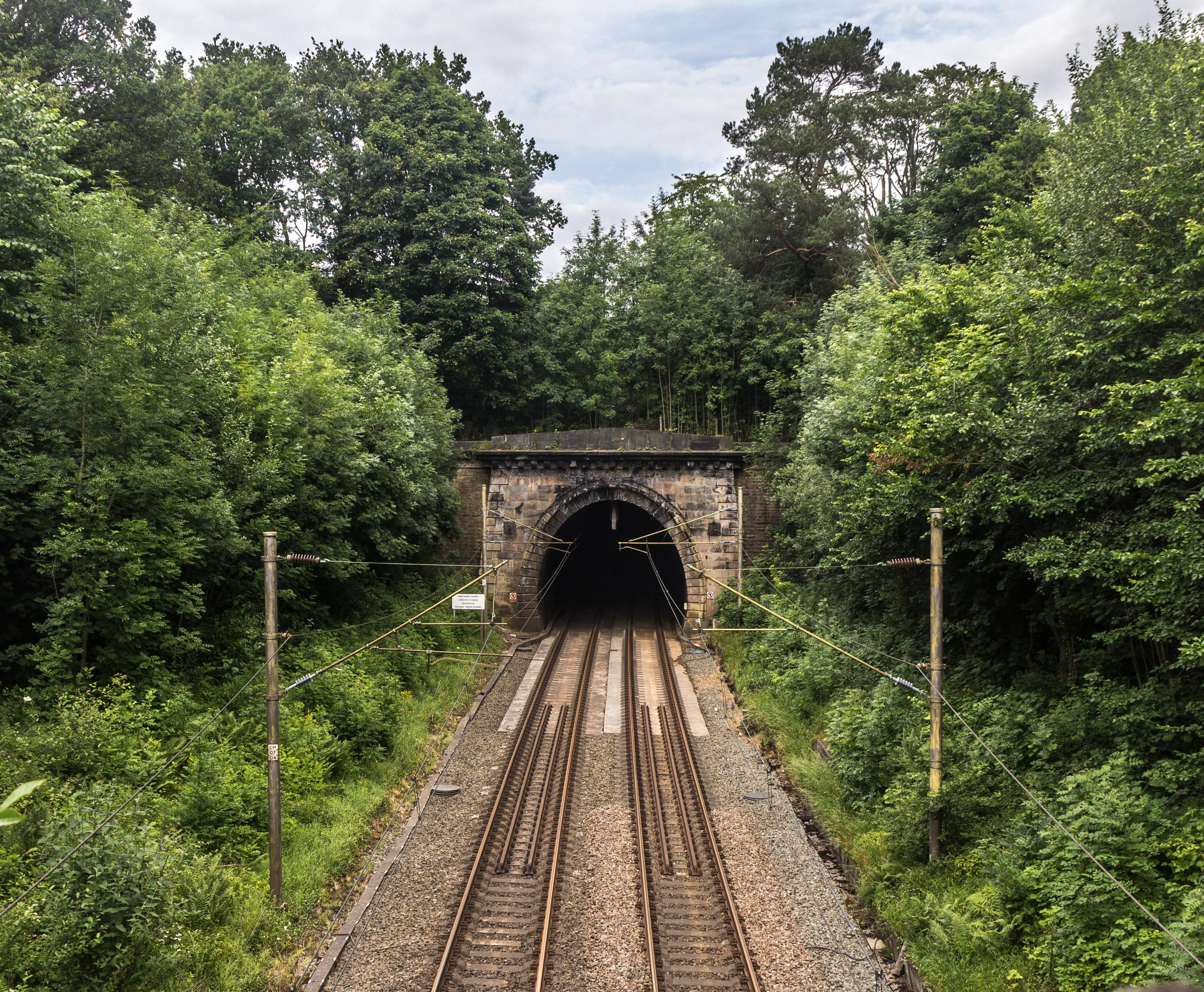
Prestbury Tunnel

The Prestbury Tunnel 53.29551°N 2.14447°W was constructed in 1845 by George W. Buck for the Manchester and Birmingham Railway. The south entrance arch is made from ashlar buff sandstone, and is Grade II listed. The arch stands proud of the rubble supporting walls, and is decorated with a modillion cornice. The north entrance arch is in brick and of a simpler design. The keystone of the northern arch has the 1845 date, and the company's initials.

== See also ==
- Rail transport in the United Kingdom
