= London to Portsmouth canal =

Coordinates: 51°7′N 0°31.2′W

London to Portsmouth Canal
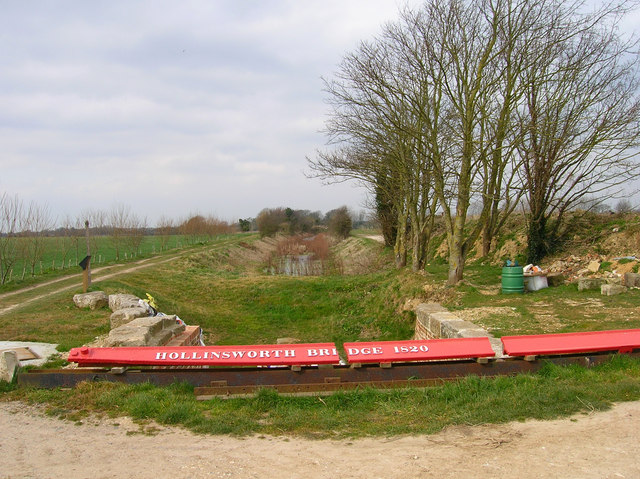
- Stewarts Bridge on the Arundel to Portsmouth section of the canal

History
- Date completed: 1823
- Date closed: 1847

Geography
- Start point: London
- End point: Portsmouth

The London to Portsmouth canal was a concept for the construction of a secure inland canal route from the British capital of London to the headquarters of the Royal Navy at Portsmouth. It would have allowed craft to move between the two without having to venture into the English Channel and possibly encounter enemy ships. There is no naturally navigable route between the two cities, which resulted in several schemes being suggested. The first, which was put before Parliament in 1641, was for a canal to link the River Wey and the River Arun, whose sources were only 2 miles (3.2 km) apart, but the bill was defeated. Improvements to the River Wey were authorised in 1651, and navigation was extended to Godalming in 1763. During the American War of Independence, goods were conveyed to Godalming by water, and overland from there to Portsmouth, but this ceased when the war ended.

Several other routes for a canal were proposed around the end of the 18th century, as was a railway, but the first to be authorised was the Wey and Arun Junction Canal, which would link the River Wey to the Arun Navigation. It was authorised in 1813 and completed in 1816. This provided a link to the south coast, but the link to Portsmouth was completed by the building of the Portsmouth and Arundel Canal linking the Arun to a ship canal near Chichester. This was authorised in 1817, and included provision for dredging a channel around Thorney and Hayling Islands and construction of another ship canal across Portsea Island. The work was finished in 1823. It was not a success, as there were problems with salt water leaking into farmland and contaminating the water supply for Portsmouth, while it was easier and cheaper to ship goods around the coast once the war with France had ended.

Between 1823 and 1825, three grand schemes for an overland ship canal were proposed, but came to nothing, despite brief interest from the Admiralty. The Portsea Canal was abandoned in 1830, having been hardly used. Trade on the Portsmouth and Arundel and the Wey and Arun canals was much lower than anticipated, and they were abandoned in 1841 and 1871, but the Chichester Canal continued to operate until 1892, when it was given to Chichester Corporation. Parts of it have been restored since 1984, and the Wey and Arun Canal Trust has also succeeded in restoring significant sections of that canal since it was formed in 1970.

== Proposed routes ==
The first serious attempt to build an inland route between London and the south coast resulted in a bill being laid before Parliament in 1641. The proposers noted that the two streams that fed the River Wey and the River Arun were only 2 miles (3.2 km) apart at Cranleigh and Dunsfold, so could be linked by a canal relatively easily. However, the bill was rejected by the House of Lords on its third reading, in common with most navigation bills of that period. Facilities at Portsmouth harbour were rudimentary at the time, but by the middle of the 18th century had been greatly improved, to the extent that it was regarded as the primary naval port in Britain.

The River Wey in Surrey is a tributary of the River Thames, joining it near Weybridge. Some improvements for navigation had been made to the river between 1618 and 1620 by Sir Richard Weston, in places where it passed through his land, but in 1651 an act was obtained from the Commonwealth's Rump Parliament, which authorised improvements on the 15 miles (24 km) between Guildford and the Thames. The work involved the construction of 12 locks and around 10 miles (16 km) of new cuts. Navigation was extended to Godalming in 1763, making another 4 miles (6.4 km) of the river accessible, and requiring four more locks. With the advent of the American War of Independence in 1776, there was a need to transfer stores and ammunition from London to Portsmouth. This was achieved by shipping it to Godalming, where a warehouse was built, and then carrying it overland to Portsmouth. The journey took around eight days, but the transfer from boat to land was not ideal, and the traffic diminished rapidly once the war ended in 1783.

The next suggestion was by the Basingstoke Canal, who proposed that their canal should be extended to link up with the Itchen Navigation, and the canal was seen as part of a larger system linking London to Portsmouth and Southampton when Phillips published his General History of Inland Navigation in 1792. Their cause was helped by the opening of the Andover Canal in 1796, leaving a gap of just 17 miles (27 km) between Andover and Basingstoke. Phillips thought that a canal between these two towns could be built within a year, which would reduce the journey time between London and Portsmouth to three days. At the turn of the century, several more schemes were proposed. William Jessop proposed a horse railway from Wandsworth to Portsmouth via Croydon, Reigate and Arundel in 1799. The Surrey Iron Railway opened in 1803, connecting Wandsworth and Croydon, and some people thought it should be extended to Portsmouth. John Rennie suggested that the Croydon Canal could be extended, passing through Horsham, Pulborough and Chichester on its way to Portsmouth. He presented a bill to Parliament, but it was rejected.

Rennie next proposed a Grand Southern Canal in 1810, which would be 95 miles (153 km) long, running from Tonbridge on the River Medway and passing through Edenbridge, Horsham, Pulborough, Arundel and Chichester. He decided not to use the River Arun Navigation, but to build a canal running parallel to it. He obtained promises of £650,000 towards the cost of building it, but again his bill was rejected by Parliament. The Earl of Egremont had built the Rother Navigation under an act of Parliament, the River Rother Navigation Act 1791 (31 Geo. 3. c. 66), and proposed extending the Petworth Branch to join up with the Godalming Navigation, but after William Jessop had surveyed the route, he abandoned the idea, and instead bought enough shares in the Arun Navigation to give him a controlling interest.

=== Wey and Arun Canal ===
In 1810, the Earl of Egremont began to promote the idea of a canal to link the Rivers Wey and Arun, separated by only 15 miles (24 km). Part of the justification for this canal through a very rural area, with few of the cargoes which had made other canals profitable, was to provide an inland route from London to the south coast of England, utilising these two rivers and the Portsmouth and Arundel Canal. This was considered an important consideration as England was at war with France and thus coastal shipping at risk of attack.

The Arun had been navigable from its mouth to Ford from the time of the Norman conquest, and from 1544, the Earl of Arundel had attempted to make it navigable to Pallingham, though passage was not easy, because of numerous flash locks. There was a further attempt to make it navigable to Newbridge in the early 1600s, but that failed. However, Newbridge was reached after a group of local entrepreneurs obtained the Arun, Sussex Navigation Act 1785 (25 Geo. 3. c. 100). They built a canal beside the river from Pallingham, rising through three locks and crossing over an aqueduct at Orford. The canal opened in 1787, and they subsequently made improvements further down river at Coldwaltham and Hardham, where three more locks and a cut were constructed.

For the connecting link to the Wey, which was known as the Wey and Arun Junction Canal, Josias Jessop, a son of the more well known William Jessop, was appointed consulting engineer in 1811 and estimated the cost of construction to be £72,217. This was later increased to £86,132 when the route was altered. A survey was carried out in the same year by Francis and Netlam Giles for an alternative route, from the Croydon Canal to Newbridge, via Merstham, Three Bridges, Crawley and Horsham.

An act of Parliament to authorise Jessop's route, the Wey and Arun Junction Canal Act 1813 (53 Geo. 3. c. xix), received the royal assent on 19 April 1813, entitled "An Act for making and maintaining a navigable Canal, to unite the Rivers Wey and Arun, in the counties of Surrey and Sussex". This authorised the construction of the canal from the Godalming Navigation near Shalford, south of Guildford to the northern terminus of the Arun Navigation at Newbridge. May Upton was appointed resident engineer in July, and work began. Construction was completed in 1816. The Junction Canal was 18.5 miles (29.8 km) long with 23 locks, but by the time it was opened the war with France was over and thus one of the key reasons for its construction was removed.

The canal was never very prosperous, but did reasonably well, with a maximum of 23,000 tons carried in 1839. However, railway competition hit hard in 1865 with the opening of the Guildford and Horsham Railway, which was in direct competition with the canal. There were also engineering problems with few sources of water to tap into, compounded by porous soil on the summit level, which led to water shortages.

=== The Arundel and Portsmouth Canal ===
Soon after the Wey and Arun was authorised, a group promoted the final link in the London to Portsmouth route, when they sought approval from the Admiralty for a canal from the Arun to Portsmouth. They consulted John Rennie, and although he still preferred his Grand Southern route, he knew that it would face the same objections from landowners, and elected for a route from Ford on the lower Arun to Chichester harbour, with a connecting link to the town of Chichester. From Chichester Harbour, boats would follow a dredged channel around Thorney and Hayling Islands and finally use the Portsea Island Canal to reach Portsmouth. Rennie's initial estimate of £118,990 was later revised to £125,452. The canal was always seen as part of a through route, with little prospect of large volumes of local trade. The Portsmouth and Arundel Navigation Act 1817 (57 Geo. 3. c. lxiii) was obtained to authorise the work, and another in 1819, to allow the canal to Chichester to accommodate small ships of 100 tons, and the Portsea Island section to be increased for 150 ton vessels. The Wey and Arun agreed to make further improvements, and the tolls for both canals were specified in the act.

Construction of the barge canal from Hunston in the west to Ford in the east began at Ford on 20 August 1818, and work started on the Chichester Ship Canal on 1 September. The Chichester Canal section was the first to be opened on 9 April 1822, the Portsea Canal followed on 19 September, with the final section from Hunston the River Arun completed the London to Portsmouth link on 26 May 1823. Water for the canal was pumped from the River Arun by a 40 hp (30 kW) steam engine but its operation had to be carefully controlled according to the state of the tide, since the water could be fresh or salty. This was obviously not always easy to do, as salt seeped into the surrounding farmland, and the company had to pay compensation to farmers. John Rennie and his son, also called John Rennie reported on the canal in 1827. They noted that the puddling was poor in places, and non-existent in others, to the extent that parts were "incapable of holding water", and the leaks made the passage of salt into farmland worse. The channel around Throney and Hayling Islands, which was around 13 miles (21 km) long, was passable even at low spring tides, although parts needed some extra dredging. A second 40 hp (30 kW) pumping engine supplied the Portsea Canal from a deep freshwater well, but saltwater entered the canal and contaminated some drinking water supplies, so again, compensation had to be paid.

=== Operation ===
The through route was not a success, with modest amounts of trade for 1824 and 1825, after which it declined. There was a brief revival in 1832 and 1833, and then it declined again. The best year was 1824, when 1,158 tons were carried to London and 2,492 tons carried in the opposite direction, but this was much lower than the 1.2 million tons confidently predicted when the Wey and Arun Canal was being promoted. With no threat of enemy attack, coastal shipping could offer cheaper rates for the journey, and the 116-mile (187 km) journey involved tidal waters, locks and tunnels along canals operated by six separate authorities. The Portsea Canal had been drained when it was inspected by the Rennies in 1827, and had been for some time. In 1826 Lord Egremont handed back his 315 shares, in which he had invested £15,750, and agreed to repay the Exchequer Bill Loan Commissioners the £40,000 which the company had borrowed from them. His only stipulation was that they should finish the canal properly.

=== Ship Canal Projects ===
At the time the canal was opening, other grand plans were proposed, which would make it redundant. The first was for two intersecting railways, which were proposed by William James in 1823. One would run from Waterloo to Shoreham and Brighton, while the second would run from Chatham to Portsmouth. This was followed by plans for a ship canal, which, like the earlier schemes, promoted the benefits of an inland route to Portsmouth in times of war. The first was proposed by James Elmes in 1824, and consisted of a tidal ship canal, which he estimated would cost £4 to £5 million to construct. A rival engineer, N. W. Cundy, ridiculed the proposal, which would be lock-free, but would need to pass through some 30 miles (48 km) of countryside which was between 200 and 400 feet (60 and 120 m) above sea level. Elmes was not deterred by this opposition, and after subscriptions for shares were obtained, a committee was appointed to take the scheme forward.

Cundy then produced his own plan for a ship canal. It would need four locks, each 150 by 64 feet (46 by 20 m) in size, would be 150 feet (46 m) wide, to allow ships travelling in opposite directions to pass each other easily, and the water would be 28 feet (8.5 m) deep. The summit level would be 21 miles (34 km) long, following the 360-foot (110 m) contour, and to achieve this would require a number of cuttings, some over 100 feet (30 m) deep. The total length was 78 miles (126 km) running from twin entrances at Rotherhithe and Deptford via Ewell, Epsom, Leatherhead, Dorking, Newbridge, Pulborough, Arundel, Chichester, Emsworth, Lanstone Harbour and Spithead. Construction would cost £4 million, and would generate an annual revenue of over half a million pounds.

A third scheme was that proposed by George Rennie and John Rennie the Younger in 1825, for an 86-mile (138 km) route through Guildford, Loxwood and then down the Arun Valley. It was longer than Cundy's scheme, but the summit level was lower, at 174 feet (53 m). The estimated cost was £7 million, which would generate a revenue of £350,000 per year. The journey from London to Portsmouth could be made in a single day, if a steam tug was used. In March 1825, a joint meeting was held, and it was agreed that the Rennies should survey the suggested routes, and recommend the best. They employed Francis Giles to carry out the survey of the levels, and recommended their own route, at a cost of around £6.5 million, which was somewhat cheaper than their estimated cost for Cundy's route. Cundy was not happy and issued a report claiming that the Rennies had not surveyed the route properly, nor understood his scheme.

Both schemes resurfaced briefly in 1827, when Cundy approached the Duke of Clarence, who was then Lord High Admiral. He suggested that the scheme should be called the Grand Imperial Ship Canal, and that Cundy should talk to Sir Edwin Owen, and the engineers of the Ordnance Department. On hearing about this, the Portsmouth and Arundel company asked the Admiralty if they would take over their canal, which led to the Admiralty asking the Rennies to carry out an inspection in 1827. Their report did not believe that the canal was likely to make any significant profit, and the Admiralty showed no further interest. Both Cundy's and the Rennies ship canal schemes were abandoned. Rennie wrote in his autobiography that the problem with the scheme was the large amount of money required for it, at a time just before much larger amounts were spent on building the railways. Thus the London, Chatham and Dover Railway, which was a similar length to his ship canal, had cost £16 million, not many years after his own proposal was rejected.

=== Demise ===
The Portsea Canal was officially closed in 1830, having been barely used in the eight years since it had been opened. A channel was dredged through Portsea Creek, which allowed boats to get from Langstone Harbour to Portsmouth Harbour, a solution that had been recommended by the Rennies in 1827. The London to Southampton Railway opened in November 1841, with a ferry connection from Gosport to Portsmouth. The London and Brighton Railway was extended to Chichester in 1846, covering much the same route as the canal from Ford to Chichester, and resulting in that section of canal closing to commercial traffic in 1847, although it remained navigable until 1856. The railway was extended from Chichester to Portsmouth in 1847, crossing Portsea Creek at Portsbridge, and a direct line from London passing through Godalming opened in 1859.

The Wey and Arun Junction Canal (Abandonment) Act 1868 (31 & 32 Vict. c. clxxiii) authorised closure. It was offered for sale in 1870, but officially abandoned in 1871. The Chichester section remained in use. Richard Purchase, who was the wharfinger at Chichester, collected about £10 per month in tolls, which covered his wages and some other expenses. Traffic dropped from 7,070 tons in 1868 to 4,000 tons in 1888, when three shareholders applied for the company to be wound up. The Chichester Canal Transfer Act 1892 (55 & 56 Vict. c. cxxxviii) transferred ownership to Chichester Corporation, and the cash in hand was paid to shareholders as a final dividend, the only dividend ever paid. The company was dissolved on 3 November 1896. The canal was disused after 1906, abandoned on 6 June 1928, and sold to West Sussex County Council in 1957.

== Restoration ==
The River Wey Navigation was given to the National Trust by its owner, Harry Stevens, in 1964. The section onwards to Godalming was given to Guildford Corporation in 1968, who passed it on to the National Trust. Both sections were thus in common ownership for the first time, and are managed as a leisure waterway, commercial traffic having ceased in 1968, although there was a brief revival in the early 1980s. The Wey and Arun Canal Trust was formed in 1970, with the stated aim of restoring both the Wey and Arun Canal and the Arun Navigation, thus restoring the link between London and the south coast. They have made significant progress, as they have been able to acquire stretches of the route from the owners to whom it was sold when the route was abandoned. Since 1984, West Sussex County Council have leased the Chichester Canal to the Chichester Canal Society, who have restored some 4 miles (6.4 km) from Chichester Basin. The seaward end has been used as moorings for yachts since 1932. The Society subsequently became the Chichester Ship Canal Trust. Complete restoration of the remainder is hampered by two bridges which have been lowered.

== Bibliography ==
- Cumberlidge, Jane (2009). Inland Waterways of Great Britain (8th Ed). Imray Laurie Norie and Wilson. ISBN 978-1-84623-010-3.
- Hadfield, Charles (1969). The Canals of South and South-East England. David and Charles. ISBN 978-0-7153-4693-8.
- Nicholson (2006). Nicholson Guides Vol 7: River Thames and the Couthern Waterways. Harper Collins. ISBN 978-0-00-721115-9.
- Priestley, Joseph (1831). Historical Account of the Navigable Rivers, Canals, and Railways of Great Britain. Archived from the original on 10 February 2015.
- Vine, P A L (2005). London's Lost Route to Portsmouth. Phillimore. ISBN 978-1-86077-514-7.
- Ware, Michael E (1989). Britain's Lost Waterways. Moorland Publishing. ISBN 978-0-86190-327-6.

== See also ==
Media related to Chichester Canal at Wikimedia Commons

Media related to Portsmouth and Arundel Canal at Wikimedia Commons

Media related to Wey and Arun Canal at Wikimedia Commons

- Canals of the United Kingdom
- History of the British canal system
