= Wey and Arun Canal =

Canal in England

Coordinates: 51.1159°N 0.5212°W

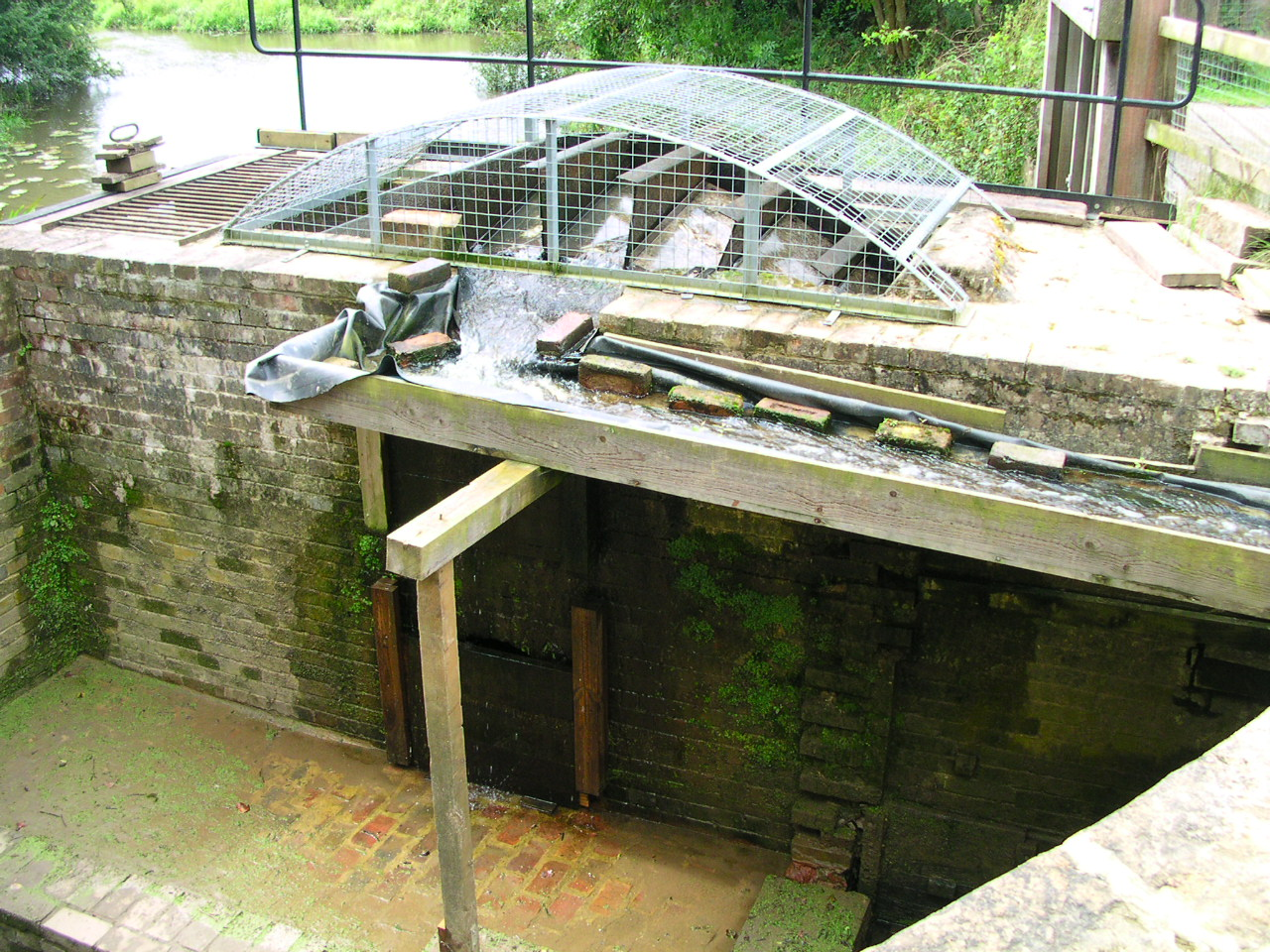
- Lordings Lock waterwheel
- Interactive map of Wey and Arun Canal

Specifications
- Locks: 27 + 3 new (originally 23 + 4)
- Status: Partially restored

History
- Original owner: Arun Navigation Company
- Date of act: 1785
- Date completed: 1790
- Date closed: 1896

Geography
- Start point: Shalford, Surrey
- End point: Pallingham, Wisborough Green, West Sussex

The Wey and Arun Canal is a partially open, 23-mile-long (37-kilometre) canal in the southeast of England. It runs southwards from the River Wey at Gunsmouth in Shalford, Surrey to the River Arun at Pallingham, in West Sussex. The canal comprises parts of two separate undertakings – the northern part of the Arun Navigation, opened in 1787 between Pallingham and Newbridge Wharf, and the Wey and Arun Junction Canal, opened in 1816, which connected the Arun at Newbridge to the Godalming Navigation near Shalford, south of Guildford. The Arun Navigation was built with three locks and one turf-sided flood lock. The Junction Canal was built with 23 locks.

Passing through a rural landscape, there was little freight traffic to justify its continued existence – the canal was officially abandoned in 1871. Without maintenance, the canal gradually became derelict over much of its length.

However, since 1970, restoration by the Wey & Arun Canal Trust has led to several miles being restored to the standard navigable by narrowboats and small tour barges. Work is continuing, with the ultimate aim of reopening the entire canal to navigation.

== Arun Navigation ==
The River Arun was used in an unimproved condition for centuries, but work was carried out on the river itself and the port of Arundel in the 16th century, which allowed boats to reach Pallingham Quay against the north of the parish of Pulborough by 1575. The act of Parliament, the Arun, Sussex Navigation Act 1785 (25 Geo. 3 c. 100), entitled "An Act for amending and improving the Navigation of the River Arun, from Houghton Bridge, in the parish of Houghton, in the county of Sussex, to Pallenham Wharf, in the parish of Wisborough Green, in the said county; and for continuing and extending the Navigation of the said River Arun, from the said Wharf, called Pallenham Wharf, to a certain Bridge, called New Bridge, situate in the parishes of Pulborough and Wisborough Green, in the said County of Sussex", received royal assent on 13 May 1785.

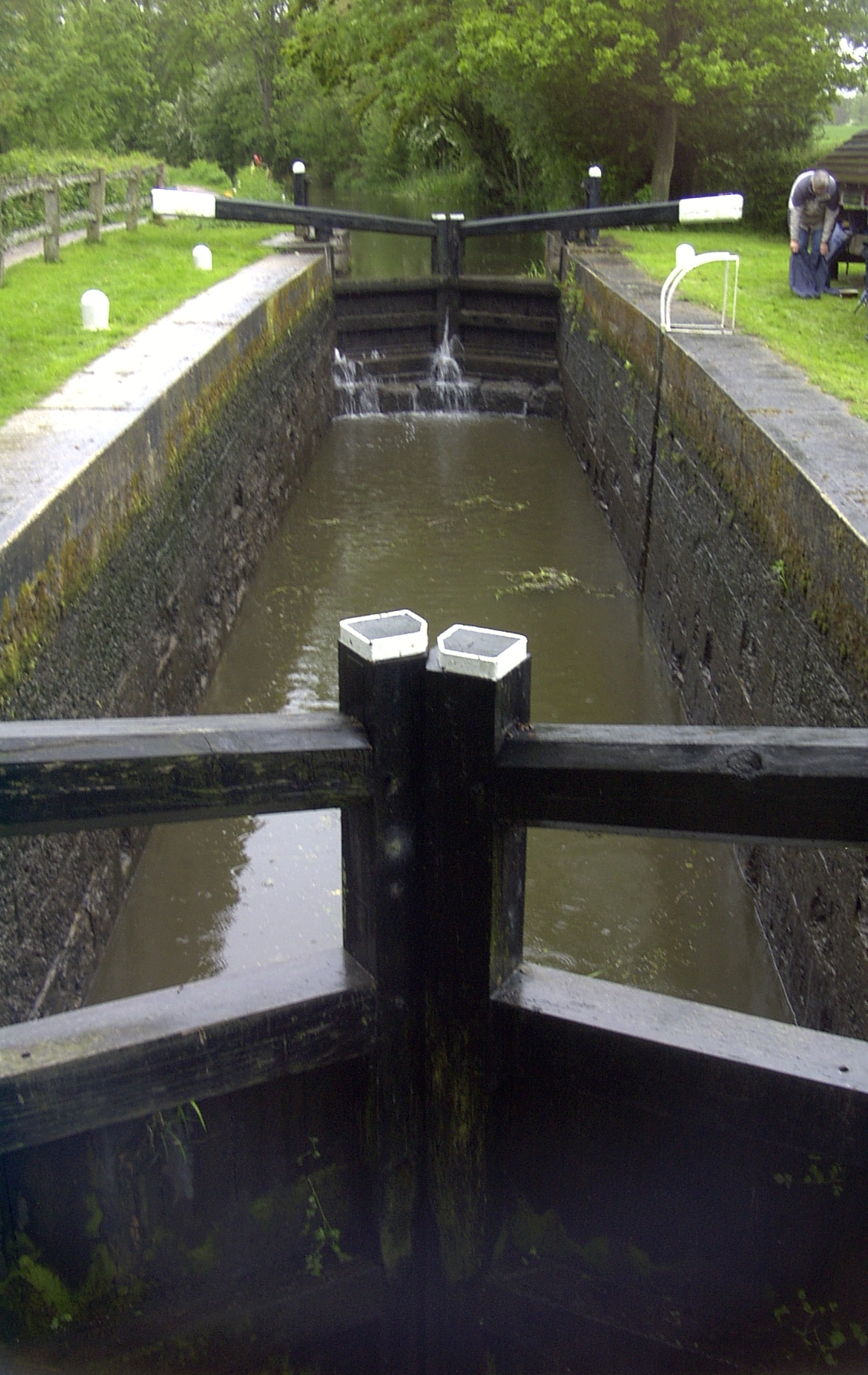
Baldwin's Knob (Stubb's) Lock: lock number 4 on the Wey and Arun Canal

Houghton Bridge was the absolute tidal limit; Newbridge lay much closer south-west of foundry-rich Billingshurst than to Pulborough. The route involved a new artificial cut of 4.5 miles (7.2 km) alongside the river, crossing the river by an aqueduct on three strong brick arches at Lordings Lock before its north end.

Completed in 1787, an undershot waterwheel of a design unique in British waterways was built into the aqueduct. Driven by the flow of the river this had scoops on the back of the blades which raised some water into the canal.

A shortcut cut was added in 1790 from Coldwaltham to Stopham, including a 375-yard (343 m) tunnel under Hardham Hill, which avoided the meander of the parish of Hardham (facing the south of Pulborough), saving 5 miles (8.0 km).

The route from Newbridge down to Houghton became 13 miles (21 km) with six locks. The river continues a further 15.5 miles (24.9 km) to the sea at Littlehampton.

The last barge to ascend between Pallingham to Newbridge was recorded in 1888. Hardham tunnel closed in 1889. The cuts were officially abandoned in 1896, but some traffic continued on the old by-river cuts into the 20th century, notably bricks from Harwoods Green below Pallingham and chalk from Houghton Bridge; most south coastal traffic was stopped in 1938 by a new, fixed bridge on the Havant to Brighton railway line at Ford.

== Wey and Arun Junction Canal ==
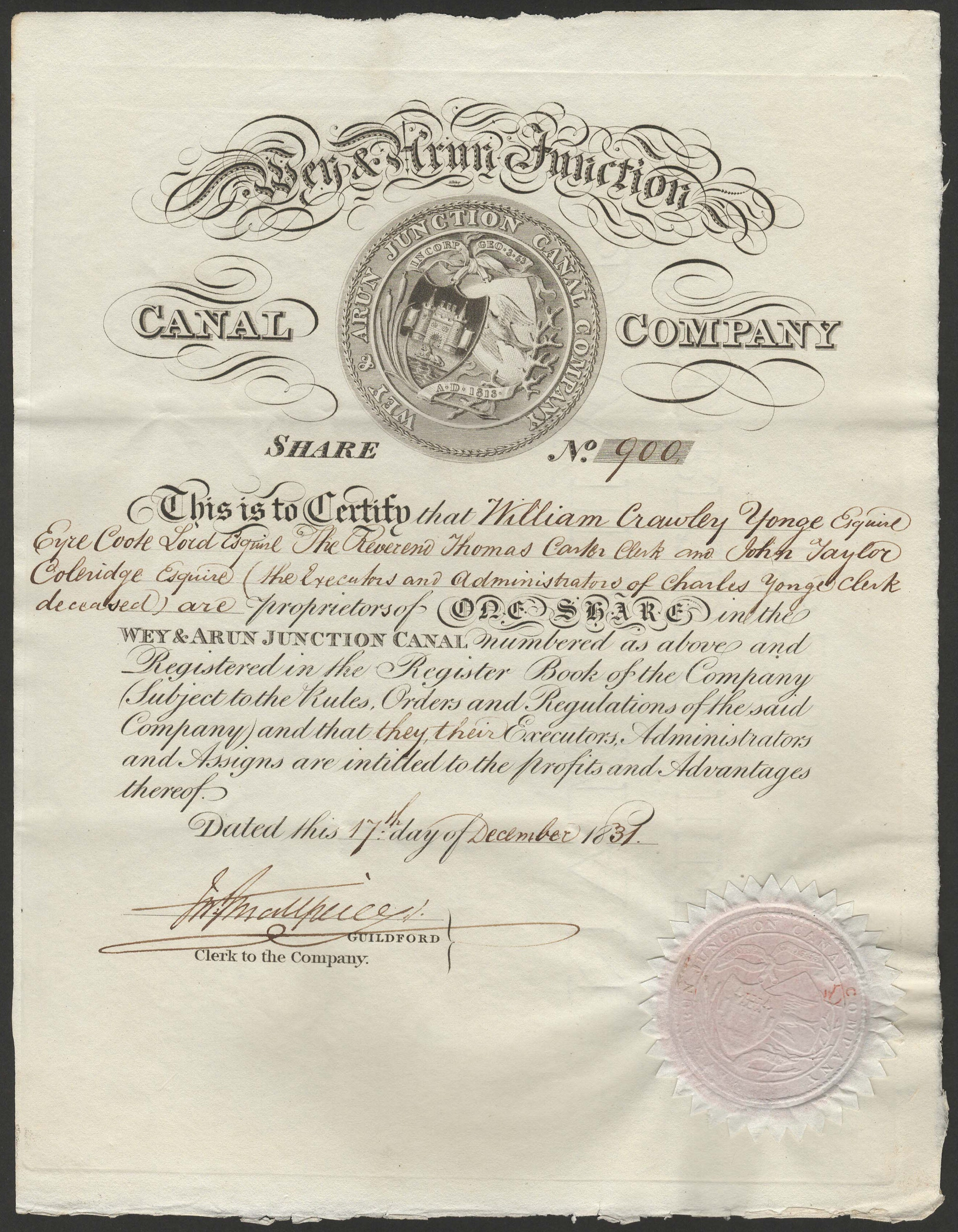
Share of the Way & Arun Junction Canal Company, issued 17 December 1831

The first scheme to link the Wey and the Arun was proposed in 1641. Headwaters of the rivers were 2 miles (3.2 km) apart, and a canal to bridge them down to a navigable upper reach was submitted as a bill to Parliament, but was dropped when it reached the committee stage. Another scheme, to tie in, additionally, the Adur and Mole was suggested in 1663, but was not pursued.

In 1810, the 3rd Earl of Egremont began to promote the idea of a canal to link the Wey and Arun, the case being they were separated by 15 miles (24 km). Part of the justification for this canal through these overwhelmingly rural counties, with few of the cargoes which made canals profitable, was to provide an inland route from London to Portsmouth and the south coast of England, an important consideration as England was at war with France and thus coastal shipping at risk of attack.

Josias Jessop (son of the more well known William Jessop) was appointed consulting engineer in 1811. It was his first job as an independent consulting engineer since he had established his reputation constructing Bristol Harbour. He made an estimate of £72,217 for construction of the canal, which he increased to £86,132 in May 1812, when he re-surveyed the route and part of it was changed. A survey was carried out in 1811 by Francis and Netlam Giles for an alternative, 37 miles (60 km) long, from the Croydon, Merstham and Godstone Railway at Merstham to Newbridge, via Three Bridges, Crawley and Horsham. A petition was presented to Parliament, but the scheme got no further.

Wey and Arun Junction Canal Act 1813
- Act of Parliament
- Parliament of the United Kingdom
- Long title: An Act for making and maintaining a Navigable Canal, to unite the Rivers Wey and Arun, in the Counties of Surry and Sussex.
- Citation: 53 Geo. 3. c. xix

Dates
- Royal assent: 1 April 1813

Text of statute as originally enacted

An act of Parliament, the Wey and Arun Junction Canal Act 1813 (53 Geo. 3. c. xix), received royal assent on 19 April 1813, entitled "An Act for making and maintaining a navigable Canal, to unite the Rivers Wey and Arun, in the counties of Surrey and Sussex". This authorised the construction of the canal from the Godalming Navigation (an extension of the River Wey) near Shalford, south of Guildford to the northern terminus of the Arun Navigation at Newbridge. May Upton was appointed resident engineer in July, and work began. Jessop designed all the main structures, including aqueducts, bridges, locks and cottages for the lock-keepers. The canal was 18.5 miles (29.8 km) long, had 23 locks and was suitable for 30-ton barges. Construction was completed in September 1816, having cost £103,000.

By the time it was opened, however, the war with France was over and thus one of the key reasons for its construction was removed. As a result, it was never very prosperous, but did reasonably well. Its record maximum: 23,000 tons was carried in 1839. However, railway competition hit hard in 1865 with the opening of the Guildford and Horsham Railway, which was in much competition with the canal. There were also engineering problems with few sources of water to tap into, compounded by porous subsoils at summit level, which led to water shortages.

Wey and Arun Junction Canal (Abandonment) Act 1868
- Act of Parliament
- Parliament of the United Kingdom
- Long title: An Act to provide for the closing of the Wey and Arun Junction Canal, and the Sale of the Site thereof; and for other Purposes.
- Citation: 31 & 32 Vict. c. clxxiii

Dates
- Royal assent: 31 July 1868

In 1867, some tourists cruised the canal whose trip was the subject of a book called The Thames to the Solent by Canal and Sea, which was published in 1868 by J. B. Dashwood, the same year in which the Wey and Arun Junction Canal (Abandonment) Act 1868 (31 & 32 Vict. c. clxxiii) authorised closure. The canal was offered for sale in 1870, but was officially abandoned on 22 July 1871. The land sold to many along its route, although the canal company was not wound up until 1910.

== Restoration ==
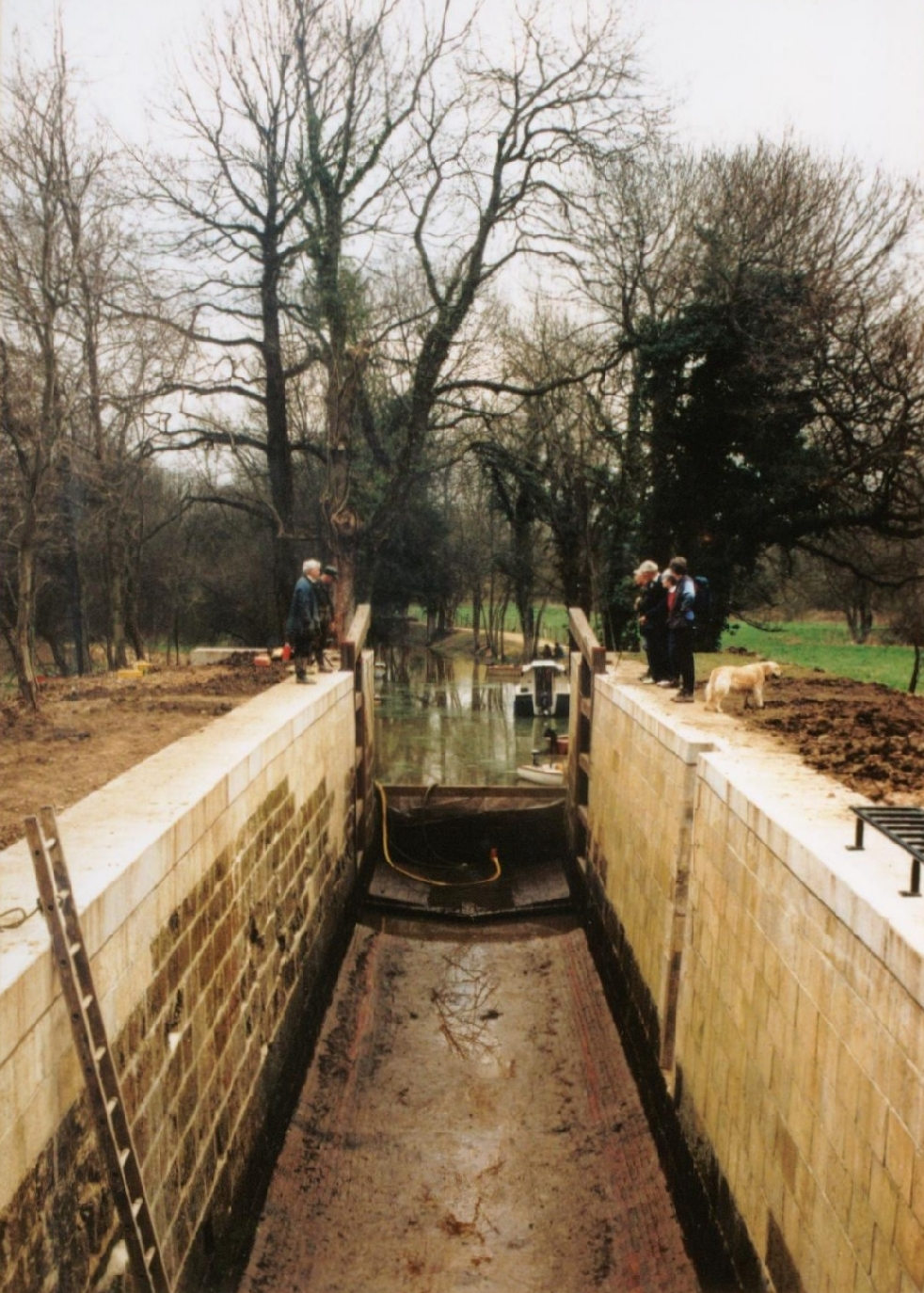
Brewhurst lock undergoing restoration

After a century of disuse, restoration began by the Wey & Arun Canal Trust.

Interest in the canal was sparked by the publication in 1965 of P. A. L. Vine's book London's Lost Route to the Sea. As a result, the Daily Telegraph weekend magazine carried a five-page article about the canal. In 1968, a local group of enthusiasts became interested in the canal, and having carried out some research into its history, formed the Wey & Arun Canal Society in 1970, with a view to reopening it. The society evolved into the Wey & Arun Canal Trust in 1973, a private company limited by guarantee with no share capital, the present custodians of the canal restoration. In 1990, the restoration was identified by the Inland Waterways Association's Restoration Committee as one of those where significant progress was being made, and which would benefit from the backing of the Association. The Waterway Recovery Group, which gave active support to restoration schemes, developed a strategy of "a guaranteed labour force for guaranteed work" in 1992, which ensured that local societies would have the funding and relevant planning permission in place before a group of volunteers arrived to carry out the work. The Wey and Arun Canal was one of three schemes where working parties were run in this way. The practical outworking of this approach was demonstrated in the following year, when a section of the canal at Billingshurst was cleared, and three accommodation bridges were rebuilt by a working party of 250 people, as part of a Waterway Recovery Group initiative called "Dig Deep".

The trust reached agreements with several landowners to allow restoration work to be undertaken over half the length of the 23-mile (37 km) canal. By 2009, twenty-four bridges had been reconstructed, eleven locks restored, two aqueducts re-instated, and several miles of canal bed cleared and dredged.

The Lordings Lock waterwheel was reconstructed by Winston Harwood during the first decade of the 21st century. In 2010 the main spindle of the wheel broke and the wheel was rebuilt to a more effective design.

Having completed a multi-million pound B2133 road bridge-centred project (see below), restoration has continued northwards. Devil's Hole Lock (lock 6) had been partially destroyed by the Canadian army as part of a training exercise in 1942. It has been rebuilt and extended to take 72-foot (22 m) narrow boats. The lock was reopened on 17 April 2010, and the opening ceremony was carried out by Colonel Paul Rutherford, the Senior Army Adviser to the Canadian High Commissioner. Southland Lock (lock 7) required significant rebuilding, as many of the original bricks were removed in the 1930s, to be re-used by a local religious order. The lock was reopened on 21 June 2014 by Simon Carter, a local landowner with land adjoining this section of the canal. Working parties have since concentrated on the building of Gennets Bridge Lock (lock 8), a major exercise requiring the construction of a new concrete shell, faced with locally made bricks, and a bridge for a bridleway as nothing was left of the original lock structure.

Southland Lock is the current northern limit of navigation on the restored section, some 3 miles (4.8 km) from Drungewick Lock (lock 3) in the south.

An isolated section of the canal at Birtley was officially reopened on 28 October 2023. This was achieved by replacing two causeways that had been built across the canal with twin lift bridges. The northern bridge was once the site of a swing bridge, but the southern causeway was a new crossing as there was never a bridge at that location prior to the canal closing.

A photo-history of the canal's restoration to date and the latest progress reports may be found on the Trust's website.

=== The B2133 bridge ===
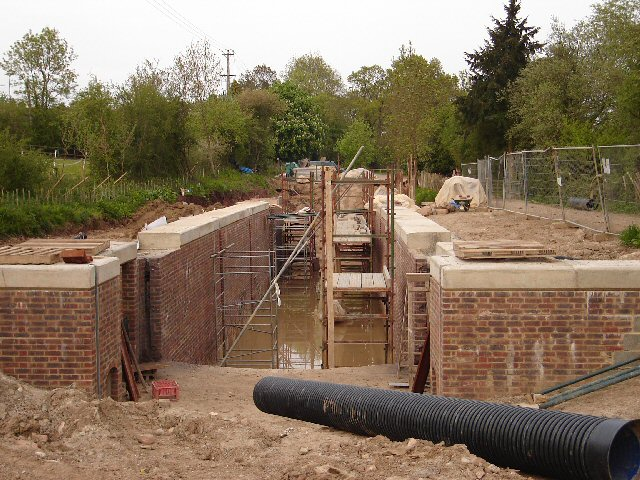
The new Loxwood Lock, under construction, in May 2006

The hump-backed road bridge at Loxwood was removed and in-filled in 1905, (to be confirmed) severing the canal in two and leaving a major obstacle to restoration. The last boat passed under the bridge in 1869.

Modern regulations prevented the installation of a replacement hump-backed bridge, so restoration required the canal to burrow underneath, leaving the road at its existing level. This was a major engineering exercise, achieved by lowering a 440-yard (400 m) length of canal so that there is adequate headroom for a boat to pass under the road. At the southern end of the length, Brewhurst Lock was reconstructed reducing its fall to 2 feet (0.6 m) from the original drop of 8 feet (2.4 m), and hence lowering the level of the water in the pound crossed by the bridge.

At the other end, a new lock (Loxwood Lock) was constructed, to provide for the 6-foot (1.8 m) difference between the new and original levels of the canal. In between, the canal bed was lowered by 4.5 feet (1.4 m), the banks shored up with piling, and a new winding hole created. The new bridge crosses the canal on a skew angle, the resulting 'tunnel' through which the canal passes measures 25 yards (23 m). The towpath runs through the tunnel, alongside the canal, and also allows pedestrians to cross the road safely; however, the restricted bridge height means horse riders must cross at road level. Suitable access pathways had to be designed-in as the towpath is a bridleway at this point.

The work was completed, and the first boat passed under the new bridge into the new Loxwood Lock in April 2009. The project cost £1.8 million, making it one of the most expensive projects to be undertaken by a volunteer canal trust, and was officially opened by Lord Sterling of Plaistow on 9 May. The Canal Trust website includes a comprehensive photo-diary of the construction work.

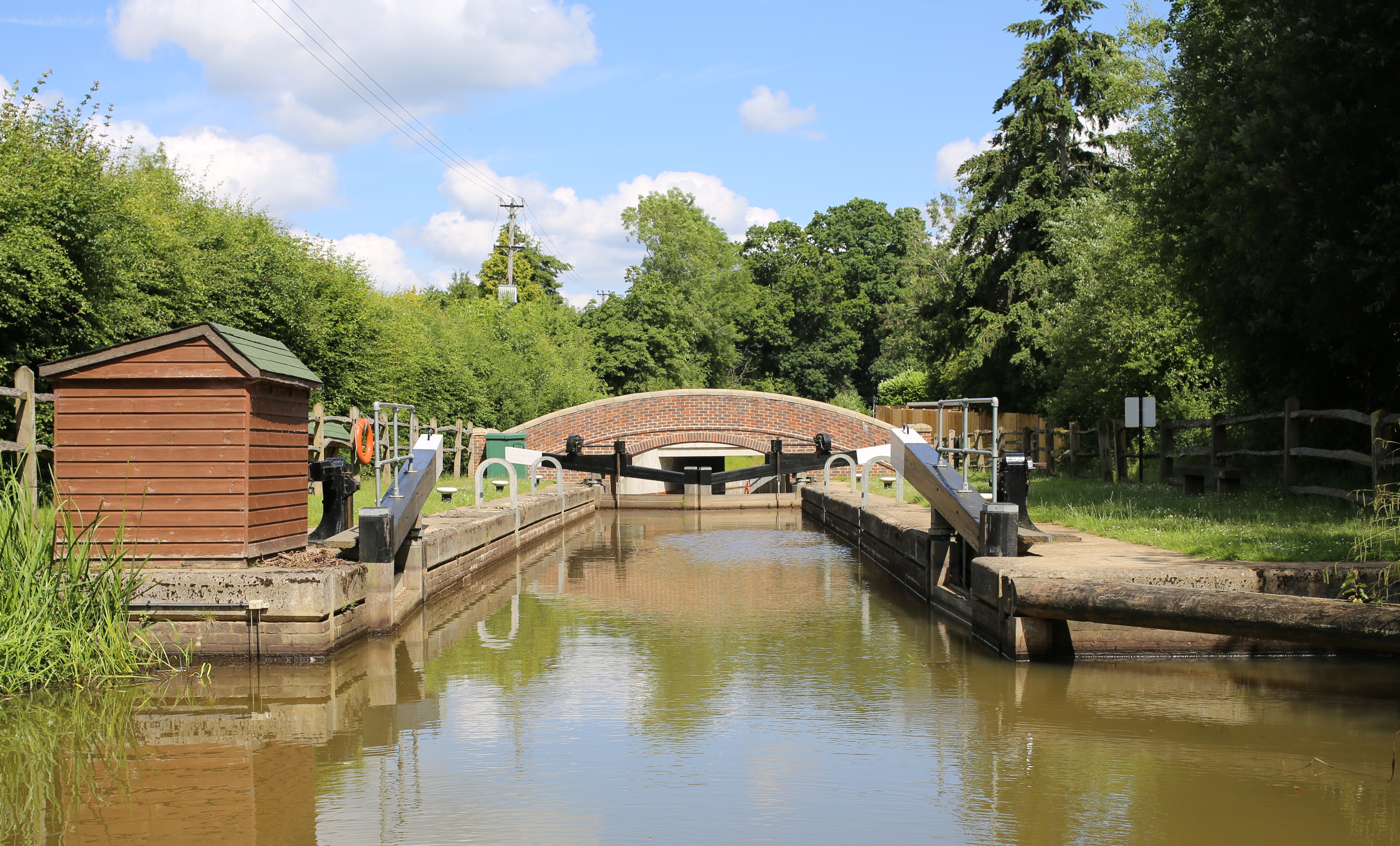
The completed Loxwood Lock

The design of the bridge was not appreciated by many of the residents of Loxwood, because of its steel barriers, and following a period of consultation and fund-raising, planning permission was obtained to replace them with lower, brick-faced parapets, to match the adjacent lock and footbridge. The lock and footbridge achieved second place in the Royal Institution of Chartered Surveyors Community Benefit Awards in 2010. The trust's success was particularly welcome, as it was the only entry in the category by a voluntary organisation, rather than a professional one. The scheme, which cost £1.9 million, was also the winner in the Community category of the 2011 Waterways Renaissance Awards. The awards are made annually by the Waterways Trust.

== See also ==
- Portsmouth and Arundel Canal - the two canals were intended to give secure inland navigation between London and the important naval base, HMNB Portsmouth

== Bibliography ==
- Cumberlidge, Jane (2009). Inland Waterways of Great Britain (8th Ed.). Imray Laurie Norie and Wilson Ltd. ISBN 978-1-84623-010-3.
- Hadfield, Charles (1969). The Canals of South and South East England. David and Charles. ISBN 978-0-7153-4693-8.
- Paget-Tomlinson, Edward (1993). The Illustrated History of Canal and River Navigations. Continuum International Publishing Group. ISBN 978-1-85075-277-6.
- Potter, Hugh (January 2009). "Wey Down South". Waterways World. ISSN 0309-1422.
- Priestley, Joseph (1831). "Historical Account of the Navigable Rivers, Canals and Railways of Great Britain". Archived from the original on 7 March 2016.
- Skempton, Sir Alec; et al. (2002). A Biographical Dictionary of Civil Engineers in Great Britain and Ireland: Vol 1: 1500 to 1830. Thomas Telford. ISBN 978-0-7277-2939-2.
- Squires, Roger (2008). Britain's restored canals. Landmark Publishing. ISBN 978-1-84306-331-5.
- Vine, P.A.L. (1988). London's Lost Route to the Sea (2nd Ed.). David and Charles. ISBN 978-0-7153-8844-0.
- Vine, P.A.L. (1999). The Wey & Arun Junction Canal. Images of England. Stroud: Tempus. ISBN 978-0-75-241721-9.
