= Portsmouth and Arundel Canal =

Canal in England

Coordinates: 50.856°N 0.559°W

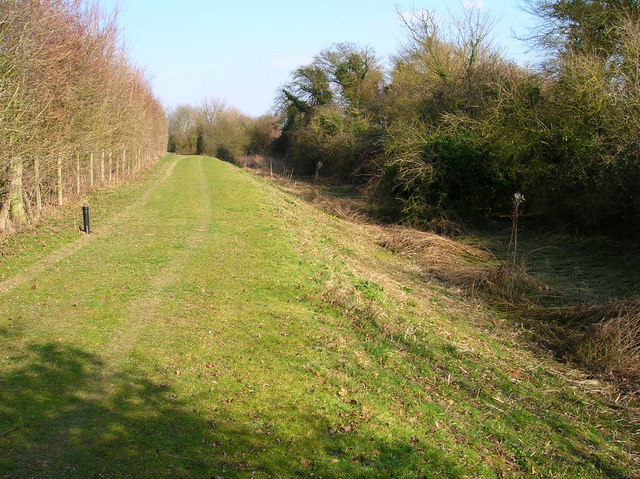
Towing path and canal bed of the Portsmouth and Arundel Canal near Woodgate, Sussex

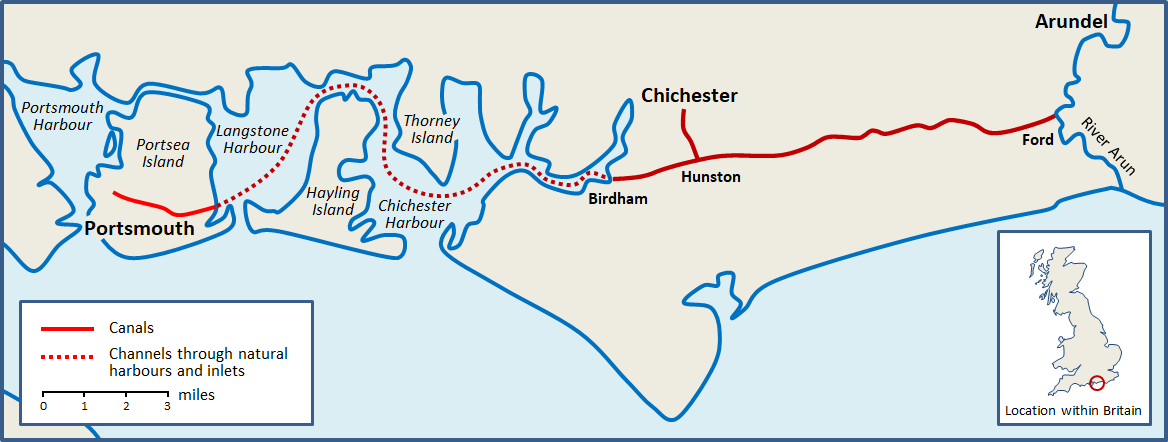
Route of Portsmouth and Arundel Canal (including Chichester Canal)

The Portsmouth and Arundel Canal was a canal in the south of England that ran between Portsmouth and Ford in the Arundel district. It was built in 1823 but was never a financial success and was abandoned in 1855; the company was wound up in 1888. The canal was part of a larger scheme for the construction of a secure inland canal route from London to Portsmouth, which allowed craft to move between the two without having to venture into the English Channel and possibly encounter enemy ships or natural disaster. It was built by the Portsmouth and Arundel Navigation Company.

The canal was made up of three sections: a pair of ship canals, one on Portsea Island and one to Chichester, and a barge canal that ran from Ford on the River Arun to Hunston where it joined the Chichester section of the canal.

== Ford to Hunston Section (Chichester and Arundel Canal) ==
This section of the canal connected the river Arun at Ford to the junction with the Chichester arm of the canal. It had two locks at Ford to allow the canal to drop 12 ft (3.7 m) down to the river.

== Hunston to Birdham Section ==
This section (technically part of the ship canal) links Chichester Harbour at Birdham with the junction at Hunston. It contains two locks: Casher's or Manhood End Lock and Saltern's sea lock. The canal was built to ship canal standards, 8 feet (2.4 metres) deep and 46 feet 8 inches (14.22 metres) wide, with locks 75 feet (23 metres) long and 18 feet (5.5 metres) wide.

== Chichester Ship Canal ==
The Chichester Ship Canal ran East from the sea lock at Birdham to the junction of the Chichester and Arundel Canal (known more commonly as the Portsmouth & Arundel Canal) at Hunston and then north to a basin (Southgate Basin) in the south of the city of Chichester.

== The Portsea Canal section ==
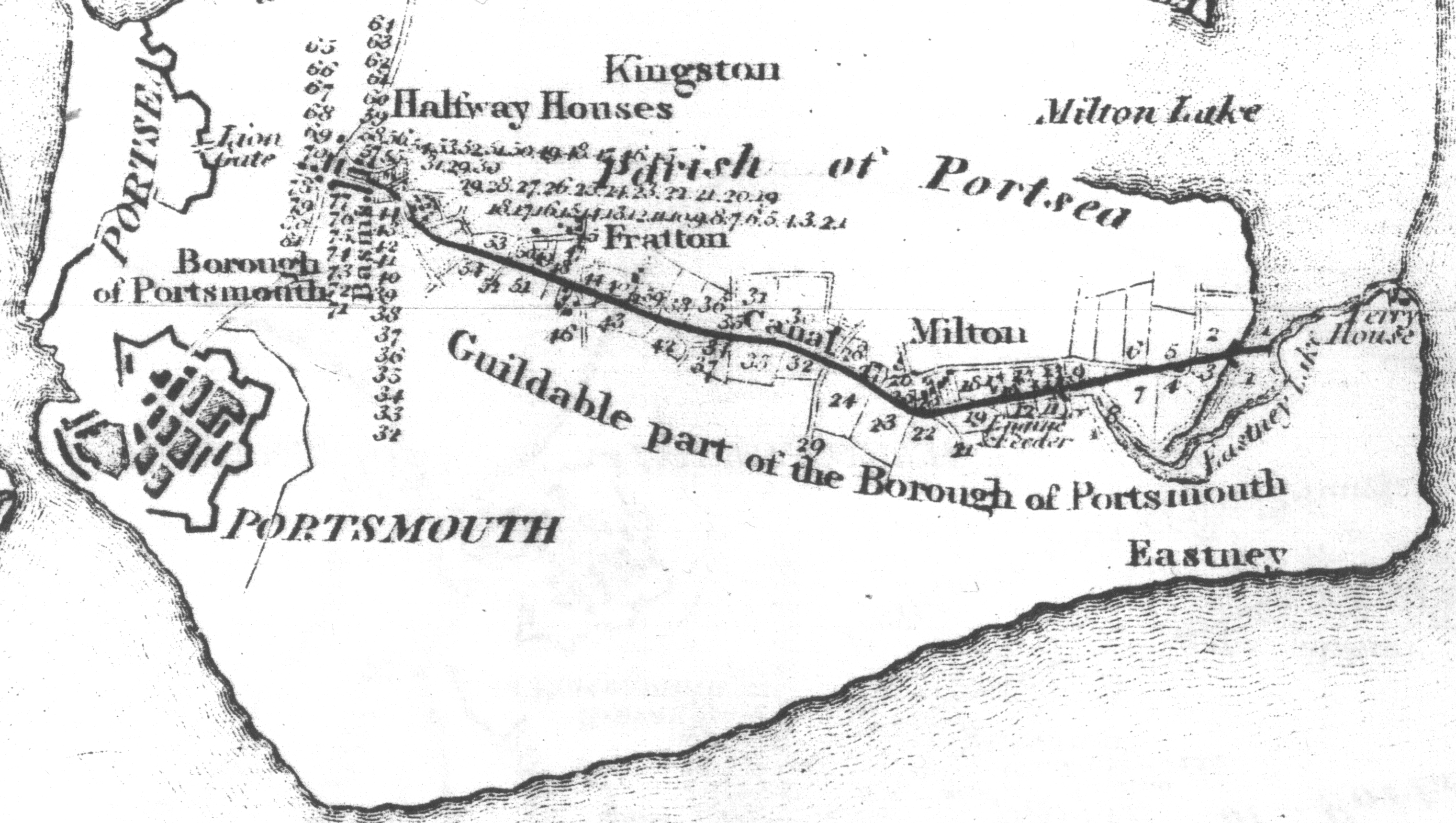
A map of the route of Portsmouth and Arundel Canal across Portsea Island from 1815

This section of the canal ran from Langstone Harbour, across the east and central areas of Portsea Island through Milton, Fratton and Landport ending at a canal basin on what is now Arundel Street, which was named after the canal. This section of the canal was built to what were then small ship canal standards and could take ships of up to 150 tons. There were 2 locks at Milton, a sea lock and an upper lock.

== The tidal channels ==
The Portsea section was connected to the rest via a 13-mile channel dredged through Chichester Harbour, past the southern side of Thorney Island (original plan was to go around the northern side) and to the north of Hayling Island, and finally across Langstone Harbour. To ease passage between the Chichester and the Portsea sections a steam vessel, the Egremont, was made to tow 40-ton barges in trains of six. For a while the company also made Portsbridge Creek navigable.

== History ==
=== Planning and construction ===
Portsmouth and Arundel Navigation Act 1817
- Act of Parliament
- Parliament of the United Kingdom
- Long title: An Act for making and maintaining a Navigable Canal from the River Arun to Chichester Harbour, and from thence to Langstone and Portsmouth Harbours, with a Cut or Branch from Hunston Common to or near the City of Chichester; and for improving the Navigation of the Harbour of Langstone and Channels of Langstone and Thorney.
- Citation: 57 Geo. 3. c. lxiii

Dates
- Royal assent: 7 July 1817

Text of statute as originally enacted

Portsmouth and Arundel Navigation Act 1828
- Act of Parliament
- Parliament of the United Kingdom
- Long title: An Act for granting further Powers to the Company of Proprietors of the Portsmouth and Arundel Navigation.
- Citation: 9 Geo. 4. c. lvii

Dates
- Royal assent: 23 May 1828

Text of statute as originally enacted

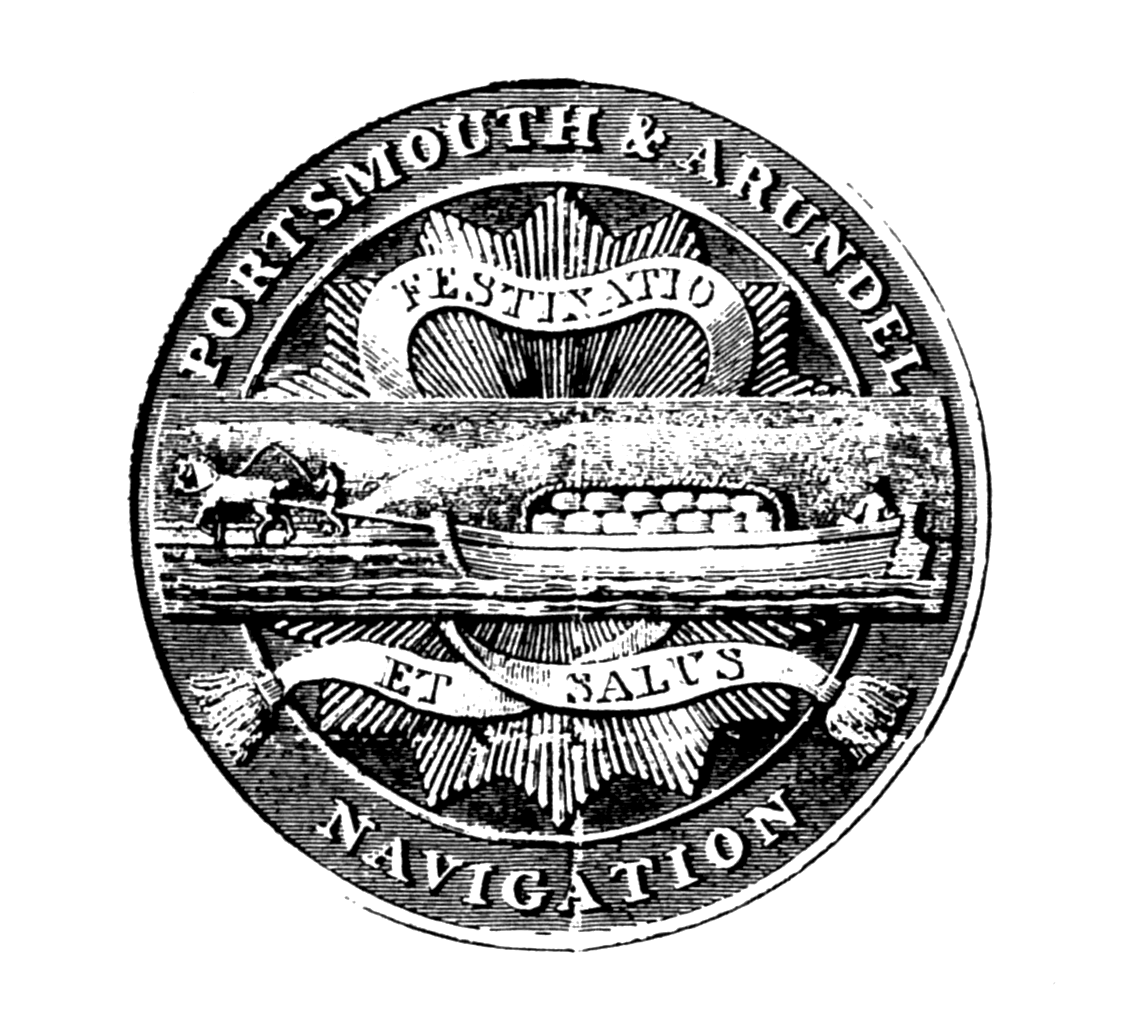
The seal of the Portsmouth and Arundel navigation company

The plan for the canal was completed in 1815 and the act of Parliament, the Portsmouth and Arundel Navigation Act 1817 (57 Geo. 3. c. lxiii), passed in 1817. At this stage costs were estimated at £119,000 rising to £125,452 in 1818. Construction started in 1818 and the canal was finished in 1823, at a cost of £170,000. The resident engineer was James Hollinsworth who was paid £500 per annum.

To supply the canal with water a pumping engine was installed at Ford to pump water from the Arun. Since the Arun is tidal at Ford the act of Parliament only allowed water to be taken from the river between two hours after high water and one hour after low. This was to prevent salt water from entering the canal. In order to allow the passage of masted ships iron swing bridges were fitted to the Chichester and Portsea sections rather than the more typical hump back canal bridge.

=== Operation ===
From the beginning the canal was plagued with various problems, and in 1827 the Portsea section of the canal had to be drained due to complaints about salt water contamination in some of Portsmouth's wells. In 1845 parts of this section were sold to the London and Brighton railway company with another section being sold to the company in 1851.

In 1830 tolls were reduced and for a while traffic picked up with cargoes including 20 tons of marble from the Mediterranean for the king. In the same year the company made Ports Creek navigable to allow the passage of barges around the north of Portsea Island to Portsmouth Harbour. The canal was also used to transport gold and silver for the Bank of England.

The canal was unable to compete with the sea routes and by 1832 the canal company was being forced to do the carrying itself. By 1847 the canal, with the exception of the Chichester arm, had ceased to be navigable.

=== Later activities ===
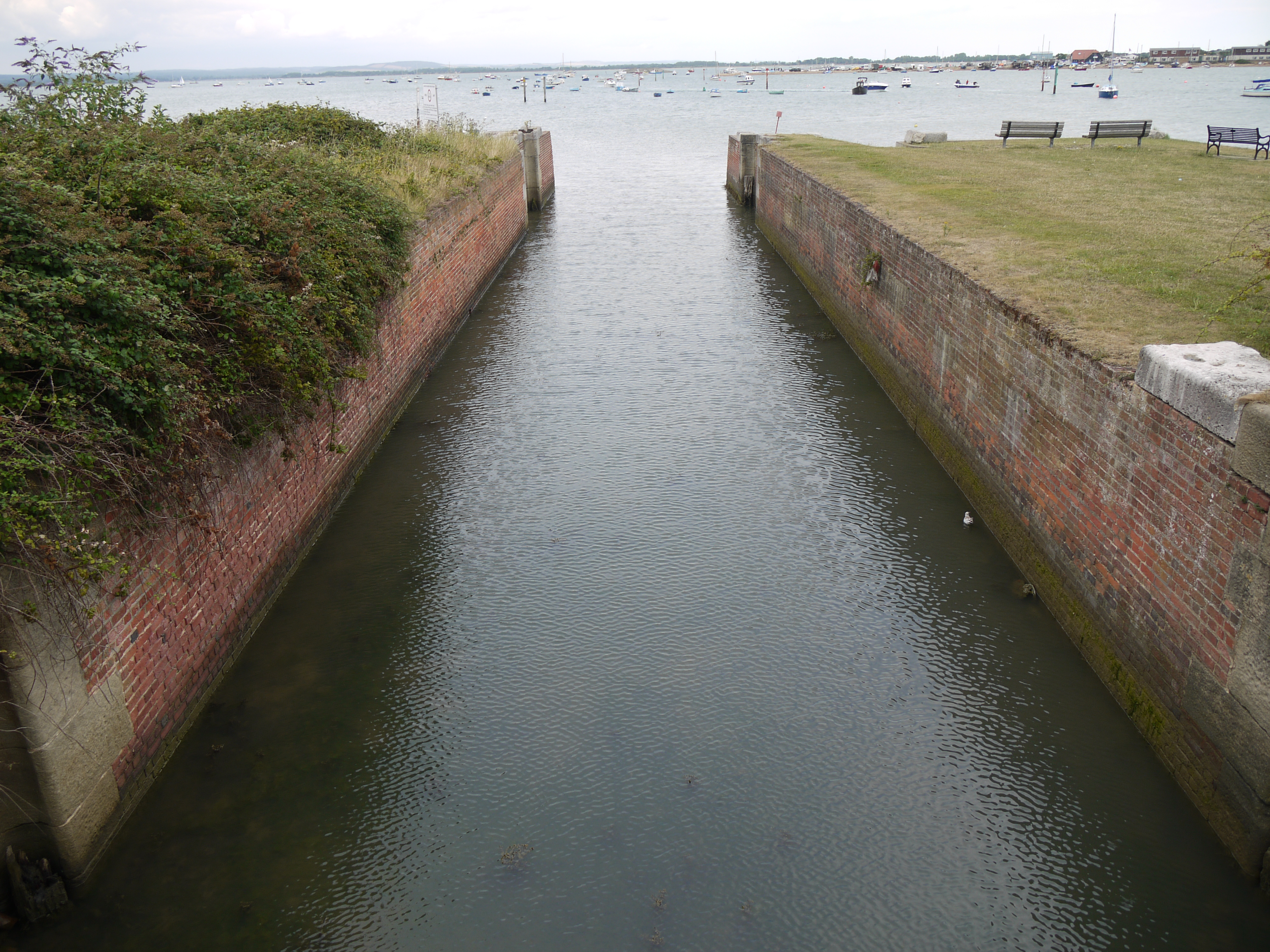
The remains of the sea lock at the end of the Portsea section

On the remaining Portsea Section the issue of maintaining the various bridges became an issue of concern until the company managed to buy itself out of the requirement to maintain them.

The Chichester arm was transferred to the Corporation of Chichester by Chichester Canal Transfer Act 1892 (55 & 56 Vict. c. cxxxviii), the same year in which the canal company was wound up (the winding up order having been applied for in 1888).

=== Post canal company ===
Some visible remains of the Portsea Section still exist in 2011. A section of the Portsmouth-London mainline railway follows the course of the canal between Portsmouth & Southsea and Fratton stations. Beyond them Goldsmith Avenue was constructed along the line of the canal. Off Goldsmith Avenue, the east-west route of the canal can still be traced by more recent residential development along Old Canal and Towpath Mead roads. The tow-path follows the course of the foot-path just north of the caravan site and allotments on the south side of Locksway Road at its easternmost end, with the canal to the north side of this. There is evidence that the canal was filled in here with coke from the local gas works. The remains of the lock into Langstone Harbour are also still in evidence. The lock has been a conservation area since 1977 and is a grade II listed structure. In 1979 Portsmouth City Council agreed to spend £35,000 over the next decade to refurbish the lock.

== See also ==
- Canals of Great Britain
- Wey and Arun Canal - the two canals together being intended to give secure inland waterway access between London and the naval base at Portsmouth.

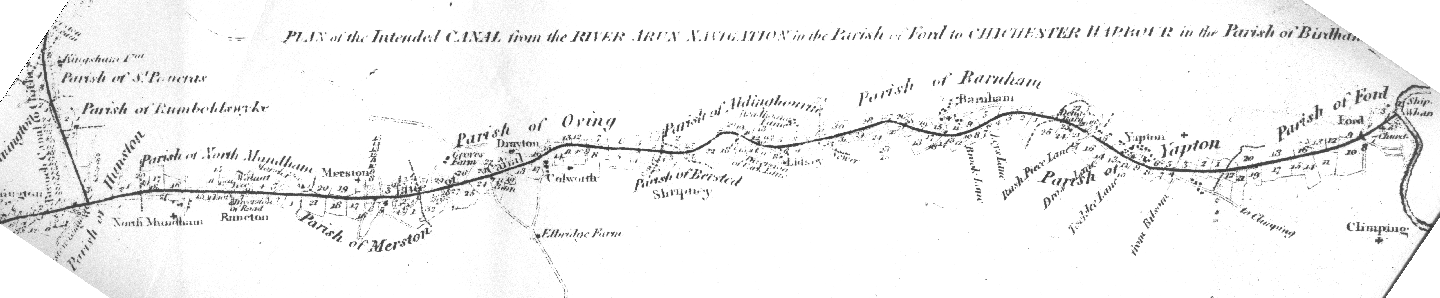
Map of section of the canal between the Chichester branch and the River Arun
