= Dacres Wood =

Nature reserve in Lewisham, London, England

Coordinates: 51.4317°N 0.0522°W

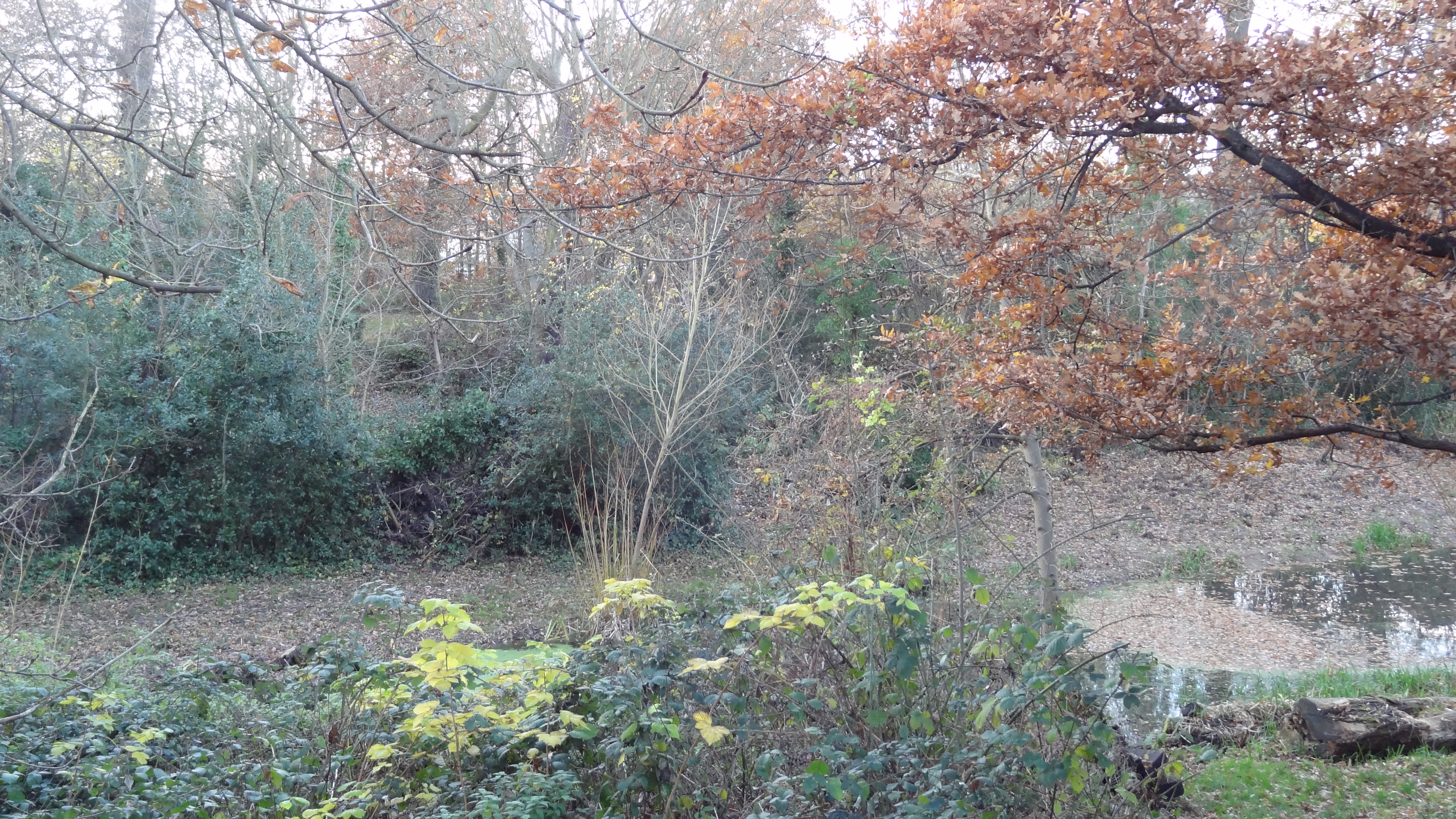

Dacres Wood is a small local nature reserve in Forest Hill in the London Borough of Lewisham. It is owned and managed by Lewisham Council.

The site is a remnant of the former Croydon Canal, which later became the garden of a Victorian house. The site's main conservation interest lies in its ponds and wetlands. In 1990 two ponds were dug and wetland plants introduced. The western part is mainly secondary woodland, which is probably the result of Victorian landscaping. An invertebrate survey in 1996 found the purple hairstreak butterfly, which frequents the tops of oak trees, and has been seen on only three sites in London.

The entrance to the site is off Dacres Road at its junction with Silverdale. It is kept locked except when a local group open the reserve on the last Saturday of each month.
