= Croydon Canal =

Former canal in south London

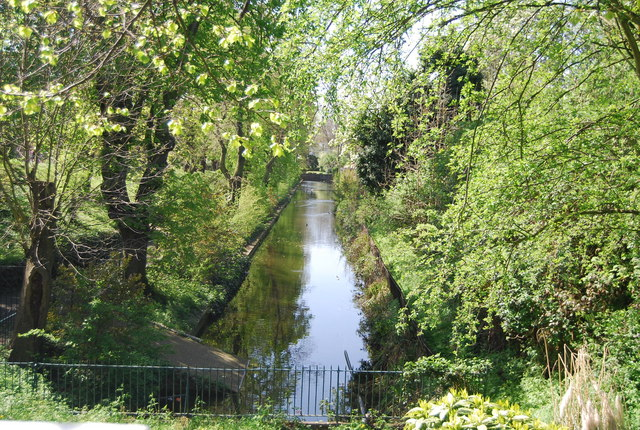
- A short section of the canal remains in Betts Park, Anerley
- Interactive map of Croydon Canal

Specifications
- Locks: 28
- Status: mostly destroyed

History
- Date of act: 1801
- Date of first use: 1809
- Date closed: 1836

Geography
- Start point: Croydon
- End point: New Cross
- Connects to: Grand Surrey Canal

The Croydon Canal ran 9 1/4 miles (15 km) from Croydon, via Forest Hill, to the Grand Surrey Canal at New Cross in south London, England. It opened in 1809 and closed in 1836, the first canal to be abandoned by an act of Parliament.

Authorised in 1801, the canal was originally intended to extend northwards to Rotherhithe, but the simultaneous construction of the Grand Surrey Canal provided a convenient access route. It was 9 1/4 miles (15 km) long, and opened on 22 October 1809.

The Croydon Canal linked to the Croydon, Merstham and Godstone Railway (itself connected to the Surrey Iron Railway), enabling the canal to be used to transport stone and lime from workings at Merstham. The canal was never extended further south-west, as was initially intended, to reach Epsom.

The canal was originally planned with two inclined planes but 28 locks, arranged in two flights, were used instead. To keep the canal supplied with water, reservoirs were constructed at Sydenham and South Norwood; the latter still exists as South Norwood Lake in a public park.

== History ==
=== Origins ===
A canal from Croydon to Rotherhithe was the idea of Ralph Dodd, who had been commissioned in 1799 to ascertain “… the most eligible part of the River Thames” for a canal from Croydon. Dodd’s canal was to be on a small scale, only 3 1/2 ft (1.1 m) deep and 24 feet (7.3 m) wide at the top for boats up to 20 tons (20.3 tonnes). It would start in today’s Tamworth Road, Croydon and head north to the west of London Road (A23) until Broad Green where it would swing northeast towards Selhurst, Woodside and the west of Beckenham. It would broadly follow the Ravensbourne valley to Lewisham and Deptford, finally turning west of north to join the Thames at Rotherhithe, a distance of about 12 miles. Instead of locks there would be horse-powered inclined planes where the boat would be lowered down the hillside in a tank of water or caisson, counterbalanced by another caisson being raised. Bridges would be minimised where possible by using paved fords, the whole costing no more than £25,000. After finishing his report in November 1799, Dodd had no further involvement with the Croydon and Rotherhithe Canal, but went on to promote a scheme for a Grand Surrey Canal from Rotherhithe.

=== Design and planning ===
Following Dodd’s report, a meeting of prospective investors was held at the Croydon Greyhound where it was agreed that a canal from Croydon to Rotherhithe would be of great utility to Croydon, towns close to the canal and considerable parts of Kent, Surrey and Sussex.

A detailed survey was made by Mr Warner, and John Rennie was hired as the consulting engineer. This canal took a more direct line to Rotherhithe along a ridge of higher ground, which could loosely be described as the west side of the Ravensbourne valley. It headed northeast from West Croydon to Selhurst, turned north to South Norwood, Sydenham, Forest Hill and New Cross to join the Thames at Rotherhithe. The canal would remain on the same level from Croydon to Brockley at 149.6 ft (45.6 m) and drop down the hillside by 17 locks or 2 inclined planes by slightly different paths to New Cross, where it would remain on the same level to a tidal lock at the Thames. Rennie agreed that a canal of small dimensions would be sufficient, but recommended a larger canal to act in part as a reservoir. It was to be 6 ft (1.8 m) deep, 34 ft (10 m) wide along the summit level from Croydon and 44 ft (13 m) wide on the lower Rotherhithe level. Rennie also favoured a canal with steam powered inclined planes over locks on cost grounds. A disadvantage of inclined planes was they could only lift smaller, lighter boats that limited the bulky goods that could be carried on the canal. Several 5-7 ton (5.1 - 7.1 tonnes) boats or barges could be pulled in gangs by a single horse, but there would be delays at the inclined planes where the boats were individually raised or lowered. At over £46,000 Rennie’s canal was nearly twice the cost of Dodd’s; a large proportion of this was for the cost of 47 bridges (£6,460) and steam engines to power the inclined planes (£6,000). The large number of bridges were necessary to allow land owners to access land bisected by the canal.

=== Royal assent ===
Croydon Canal and Croydon, Streatham, Dulwich and Sydenham Water Supply Act 1801
- Act of Parliament
- Parliament of the United Kingdom
- Long title: An act for making and maintaining a navigable canal from or from near the town of Croydon, in the county of Surrey, into the Grand Surrey Canal, in the parish of St. Paul, Deptford, in the county of Surrey; and for supplying the towns of Croydon, Streatham and Dulwich, and the district called Norwood, in the parish of Croydon, in the said county of Surrey; and the town of Sydenham, in the county of Kent, with water from the said canal.
- Citation: 41 Geo. 3. (U.K.) c. cxxvii

Dates
- Royal assent: 27 June 1801

Text of statute as originally enacted

Rennie completed his report on the 8 October 1800, which was presented to the investors on 10 October 1800. They adopted Rennie’s recommendation for a canal with inclined planes and submitted a petition to parliament on 18 February 1801. A petition for Dodd’s Grand Surrey Canal had already been submitted, and its proprietors petitioned against the Croydon canal bill in the House of Lords. As a result, the Croydon canal was changed to join the Grand Surrey Canal rather than the Thames. There were other petitions for and against the canal but the biggest effect was the petition from the Wandle mill owners. They were concerned that a deep cut across Croydon Common, between West Croydon and Selhurst would drain water into the canal instead of Norbury Brook and the River Wandle to the detriment of their mills. As a result the canal had raised banks across Croydon Common so it only cut 3 ft (0.91 m) into the soil and reduced its depth to 5 ft (1.5 m). The summit level between Selhurst and Honor Oak Park was also raised further up the hillside. Despite these delays the canal received royal assent on 27 June 1801 via the Croydon Canal and Croydon, Streatham, Dulwich and Sydenham Water Supply Act 1801 (41 Geo. 3. (U.K.) c. cxxvii).

=== Inclined planes to locks ===
The decision to implement a canal with locks was made soon after the act of Parliament was passed, because "it was realised the boats would be too small to meet the needs of the public, particularly the conveyance of large sized timber". The board realised there would be little cost advantage over toll-roads without larger 30-35 ton (30.5 - 35.6 tonnes) boats and traffic on the canal would be less than Rennie’s estimate of 5 boats in each direction. Trade was also threatened by the Surrey Iron Railway, which had received royal assent a month before the Croydon canal. Connection with the Grand Surrey Canal took boats close to the King’s Yard and victualing office at Deptford. These docks supplied the Royal Navy, but supply ships sailing along the coast to Portsmouth were liable to attack from the French and an inland navigation was desirable. In 1802, Rennie was commissioned to consider extending the canal to Portsmouth, but ultimately nothing became of it.

The adoption of locks required a water source for the canal to replace water lost when ascending / descending through the locks. Rennie’s original plan was to pump water from the Thames, which with the cost of the locks made it nearly £20,000 more expensive than a canal with inclined planes. The proprietors considered a deviation between Brockley and the Grand Surrey Canal so the ascent / descent would be less steep, take the canal closer to the King’s Yard and join the Grand Surrey at its southeast corner. This conflicted with plans for a branch of the Grand Surrey Canal to Deptford, and was objected to by their board. Instead, reservoirs were built at South Norwood and Sydenham. According to the resident engineer Dudley Clark the canal “is of itself so considerable, that, with the addition of a large reservoir upon Sydenham, and another upon Norwood Common, it leaves no doubt, of a most ample supply in the driest season." The reservoirs collected rainwater from the adjacent hillsides by ditches or feeder canals. Rainwater was also collected by ditches on Plowgarlic / Telegraph Hill above New Cross that fed into small reservoirs or side ponds at the locks.

=== Implementation ===
The canal was 34 feet (10 m) wide. It had a maximum depth of 5 feet (1.5 m). After the initial flights of locks, most of the canal followed the 161 feet (49 m) contour.

The first 2¼ miles of the canal was dug approximately between today’s Penge West and Forest Hill railway stations. By 17 April 1804 tenders were invited for cutting the remaining 2 miles of the canal’s north end and contracts for the iron and woodwork on “upwards of 20” locks were received a month later. By October 1805 Sydenham reservoir had been completed, the canal was in water and in use from within a few miles of the town of Croydon to Brockley Green for conveying bricks, timber and other materials for the works. The Brockley locks were “well built and exceedingly water tight”. Closer to New Cross the canal was less complete and locks were in every stage of their progress. Around March 1807 a commodious bridge carried the New Cross Road over the canal at New Cross. Contrary to Rennie's original plan there were also locks between New Cross Road and the Grand Surrey Canal.

The proprietors expected to join the Grand Surrey canal by July, having announced to the public that it would be open for navigation from the Thames to the crossroads at (South) Norwood. The canal was at least partially open by 15 August 1807. Hugh McIntosh, a major construction contractor, claimed he played a significant part in the canal’s construction.

Croydon Canal Act 1808
- Act of Parliament
- Parliament of the United Kingdom
- Long title: An Act for enabling the Company of Proprietors of the Croydon Canal to complete the same.
- Citation: 48 Geo. 3. c. xviii

Dates
- Royal assent: 14 April 1808

Text of statute as originally enacted

Having already spent over £68,000 on the canal, the company required a further £30,000 to complete the works and repay the money borrowed. They petitioned Parliament on 10 February 1808 and were granted authority to raise the additional funds via the Croydon Canal Act 1808 (48 Geo. 3. c. xviii) on 14 April 1808. Although the act did not increase the tolls, the minimum tonnage was increased from 4 to 20 tons when passing through a lock. Tenders were placed for bricks, building the basin wall at Croydon, fencing, a crane, counting house, warehouse and lock keeper’s cottage at Forest Wood. Despite raising the summit level, it was still lower than Croydon Common and a deviation between Selhurst and West Croydon was considered. Instead it was decided to raise the canal by two additional locks near Selhurst. These final two locks at Croydon Common raised the canal to the 174 feet (53 m) contour, and because there was no natural source of water a steam pumping station was built at the foot of the locks to pump water up to the summit pound.

At around £300 p.a. this was expensive to run. In June 1830 a new pumping engine was installed on Croydon Common, which was the first commercial installation of Samuel Brown's gas vacuum engine, and quite probably the first commercial internal combustion engine in the world. The economics of the gas engine were interesting as the gas it consumed was made by turning coal into coke. The value of the resulting coke and coal tar by-products of making the gas substantially exceeded the cost of the coal, ground rent, repairs etc., so the gas vacuum engine made a profit of over £100 a year before considering the useful work it was doing. Unlike a steam engine, which required time for the water to be heated into steam, Brown’s engine could be turned on and off almost instantly; it was typically used for 3 hours every other day. Around 1827 there was a steam engine near today’s Towpath Way, south of Tennison Road, Selhurst to pump water from a well or spring.

The canal had 28 locks, 11 more than Rennie planned (excluding the Thames lock): 10 near New Cross, 16 between Forest Wood (Honor Oak Park) and Brockley, and two near Selhurst. The locks would only admit boats 60 ft (18 m) long rather than 75 ft (23 m) long as originally proposed. Lock 26 near Honor Oak Park had three gates which could be used singly or in pairs, and would today be counted as two locks. Near the Thames, the Grand Surrey Canal became a dock which had a lock to protect the canal, and another at the Thames, making a total of 31 locks for the navigation from Croydon to the Thames.

=== Opening and third act of Parliament ===
The canal was officially opened on Monday 23 October 1809 with a procession that left Sydenham at 11am to a band playing "God save the King" and a 21 gun salute. The proprietor’s barge was followed by “a great many barges loaded with coal, stone, corn etc.”

At Croydon they were greeted by many thousands of people, church bells, guns firing and a band playing "God save the King". The proprietors witnessed the arrival of the barges at the Croydon basin, examined the wharf and warehouses before walking to the Greyhound at 4pm, led by the workmen marching in order with their tools on their shoulders and accompanied by a band.

Croydon Canal Act 1811
- Act of Parliament
- Parliament of the United Kingdom
- Long title: An Act for enabling the Company of Proprietors of the Croydon Canal to raise Money to complete the said Canal and Works, and for amending the former Acts passed relative thereto.
- Citation: 51 Geo. 3. c. xi

Dates
- Royal assent: 4 April 1811

Text of statute as originally enacted

Despite the canal being opened, it was not complete. They had not built the road mentioned in clause 10 of their first act between Church Street and the Croydon wharf and in January 1810 they invited tenders for warehouses at Croydon, with more in August. A third act of Parliament, the Croydon Canal Act 1811 (51 Geo. 3. c. xi) was sought and granted in 1811 to raise £80,000 (with £2,658 in hand) to pay off debts (£25,700), loans (£29,615) and complete the works (£27,343). The total cost of the canal and works was £150,000. Tenders for the road, and a tramway along its east side were sought. The tramway connected with the Croydon Merstham and Godstone railway and ran alongside the south side of the canal basis. It was open for business by January 1812 when it was leased to Edward Grantham. Other work included enlarging the reservoirs and building wharves at New Cross and Sydenham. Sydenham wharf was on the site of today’s Sydenham railway station on Sydenham Road and was initially leased to R Hutson on 22 December 1813. It was subsequently let to Henry Doo on 23 October 1824 until the canal closed when he was a successful coal merchant, lighterman and boat owner with an average trade of £700 p.a. Land owners were also entitled to build wharves (clause 102), which included Penge wharf on the north side of Penge High Street, near Penge West railway station.

=== Boats ===
By 1811, 22 barges plied the canal. The barges were 60 feet (18 m) long and 9 feet (2.7 m) wide and could carry about 30 tons. The main cargo was timber.

The barges, or strictly lighters, had flat bottoms, which were joined to the sides of the boat by a quadrant of a circle to reduce damage to the canal bank. Depicted in several paintings, the barges had no living accommodation, were steered by a large rudder and pulled by a horse led along the towpath on the easterly side of the canal. At least initially, the docks on the Grand Surrey Canal near the Thames had no towpath. There was also no towpath on the Thames, which barges navigated using the tides, rudder and oar-like sweeps. Navigation through the pool of London was particularly dangerous because of the shipping, and in 1818 a Croydon canal bargeman was assaulted seeking shelter at a private mooring during tempestuous weather.

The boats had to be registered with the canal company and the number, name of the owner and abode had to be painted in white letters 4 inches high on a black background (clause 105). The canal company had its own barges, not only for the construction and maintenance of the canal, but also for its own freight carrier business that barely broke even. This was often prohibited in canal acts to reduce the risk of anticompetitive behaviour.

Pleasure craft also plied sections of the canal, to the benefit of several hostelries. The Selhurst lockkeeper, ‘old Grumble’, rented boats at a shilling (5p) an hour.

=== Trade ===
Dodd’s introductory report forecast revenues of more than £3,200, most of this was from the importation of coal via London:

Dodd's revenue estimates (Based on an average journey of 8 miles and 240d to £1)
Imports	Annual tonnage	Rate (per ton mile)	Revenue per annum
Coal	31,250	2d	£2,083
Other goods including imported timber	6,000	2d	£400
Manure	2,000	1d	£67
Exports			
Native timber	4,000	2d	£267
Stone, Fuller’s earth, charcoal	6,000	2d	£400
			£3,217

Dodd believed the canal would stimulate demand by reducing transportation costs to a quarter to a third of those by road and extend trade to places as far away as East Grinstead. The committee did determine its own forecasts following Rennie’s report, but Phillips feared the lack of manufacturing towns, mines and heavy goods would prevent a proper return for investors.

Trade was boosted with the opening of the canal tramway by around £600 per annum with goods from Merstham quarry transported to the canal via the Croydon Merstham and Godstone iron railway. Toll revenues averaged about £2,700 between 1820 – 1824, but there were additional revenues from rents of about £350 p.a. and £80 p.a. from osier sales, as well as the freight business. This was comparable with Dodd’s estimate, but the capital cost was significantly higher. The tolls authorised by parliament were also higher, although the company may have set lower rates:

Tonnage rates (per ton per mile)	d
Timber, Stone, Coal, Bricks, Tiles, and all other goods and commodities	3
Dung, Chalk etc.	1½

Profits and dividends were significantly less because of costs. In 1827 the canal made a profit of £196 on revenues of £3,634, which had steadily declined from a profit of £500 in 1825. There were calls to close the canal, but it was agreed to continue for another year without incurring further expense.

=== Closure and opening of the railway ===
The canal was never a success and closed in 1836, the first canal to be abandoned by an act of Parliament, the London and Croydon Railway Act 1835 (5 & 6 Will. 4. c. x). Much of the alignment was used by the London and Croydon Railway Company, which had bought the canal for £40,250, for part of the railway between London Bridge and West Croydon station, which is on the site of the canal basin. The gas vacuum engine appears to have been in full working order when offered for sale in 1837. It was described as able to lift water a height of 11 feet (3.4 m) at a rate of 2,000 imperial gallons per minute (9.1 m^{3}/min). Tenders for its purchase (including the 18-foot (5.5 m) diameter gasometer) were to be sent to the offices of the Croydon Railway Company, which shared the same address as the London and Croydon Railway Company and dealt with the acquisition of the canal and disposal of any unwanted assets.

== Today ==
After the canal closed, sections were retained for leisure use, and some remained in water for a considerable time. The section at the Anerley Arms, Ridsdale Road in Anerley was used as a boating lake, and the area was called Anerley Tea Rooms. The canal in Betts Park was turned into a concrete trough in 1934, approximately 170m can still be seen at the northern corner of Betts Park. Another section exists as a long curved pond in the Dacres Wood Nature Reserve in Dacres Road, Forest Hill. This was considered for redevelopment in 1989, but research by Lewisham Council resulted in its identity being confirmed and it now forms an attractive wetland, having been returned to its former width. There is a high pavement in David's Road, Forest Hill, which is thought to be part of the towpath. Part of the wall below the path has been rebuilt with murals depicting transport in Forest Hill. The Norwood reservoir is now preserved as South Norwood Lake.

== Points of interest ==
Point	Coordinates (Links to map resources)	OS Grid Ref	Notes
Lock 10	51.4715°N 0.0363°W	TQ364765	New Cross
Bottom of Honor Oak flight	51.4645°N 0.0372°W	TQ364757	Brockley
Top of Honor Oak flight	51.4498°N 0.0482°W	TQ357741	Honor Oak
David's Road	51.4403°N 0.0549°W	TQ352730	Raised towpath
Dacres Wood	51.4320°N 0.0523°W	TQ354721	Nature reserve
Penge Wharf	51.4185°N 0.0598°W	TQ350706	Penge
Anerley	51.4144°N 0.0661°W	TQ345701	Tea rooms
Betts Park	51.4096°N 0.0660°W	TQ346696	Concrete trough
South Norwood lake	51.4071°N 0.0742°W	TQ340693	Feeder reservoir
Croydon Common Locks	51.3866°N 0.0871°W	TQ332670	2 locks
West Croydon Basin	51.3789°N 0.1022°W	TQ321661	Terminus

== Gallery ==
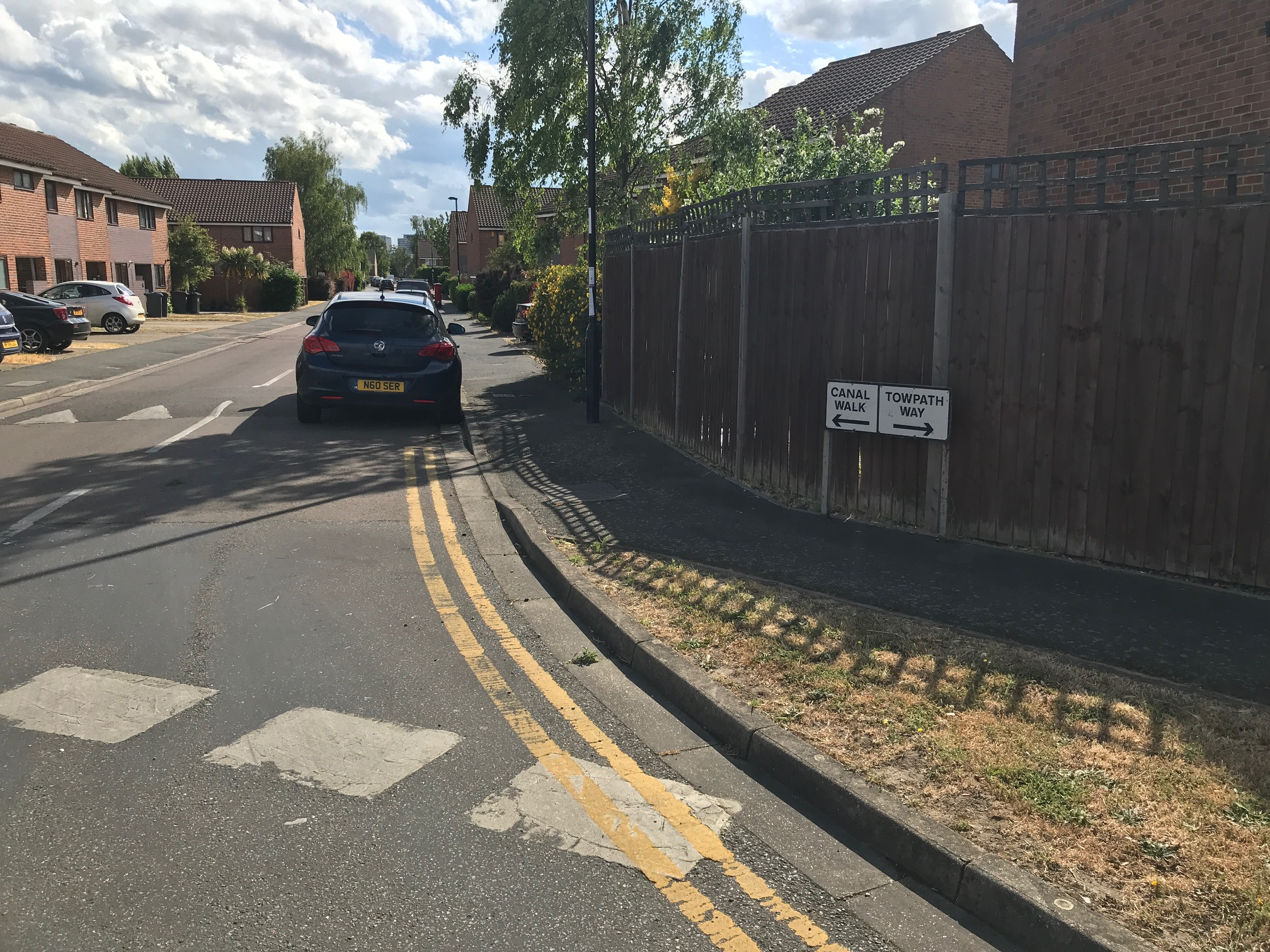
Modern roads built over and named for the canal

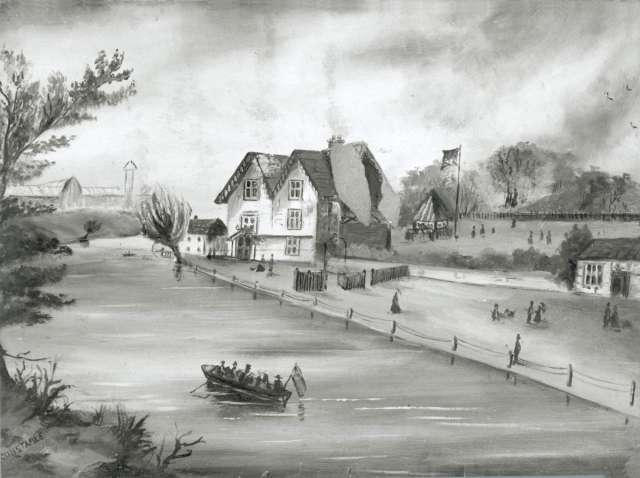
Anerley, 1860. This part of the canal remained, after closure, for pleasure boating

== See also ==
- Canals of the United Kingdom
- History of the British canal system

== Bibliography ==
- Dodd, Ralph (1799). Introductory Report on the proposed canal navigation from Croydon to the River Thames at Rotherhithe. London: Gosnell.
- Hadfield, Charles (1969). The Canals of South and South East England. David and Charles. ISBN 978-0-7153-4693-8.
- Russell, Ronald (1971). Lost canals of England and Wales. David and Charles. ISBN 978-0-7153-5417-9.
- Salter, Brian J (1986). Retracing canals to Croydon and Camberwell. Living History Publications. ISBN 0-905592-01-8.
