= Chichester Canal =

Canal in Chichester, England

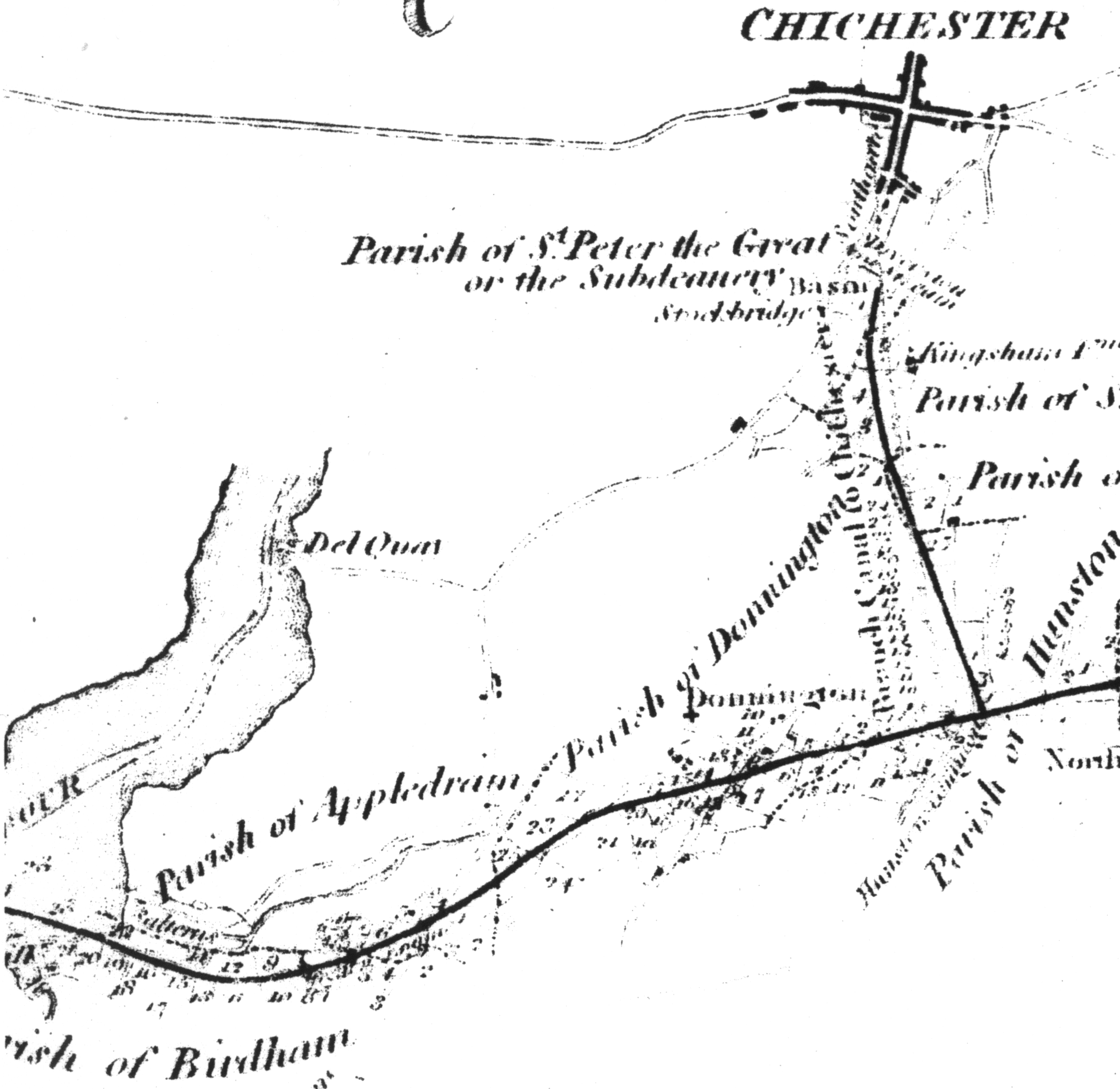
- A map of the planned route of the canal from 1815
- Interactive map of Chichester Canal

Specifications
- Maximum boat length: 85 ft 0 in (25.91 m)
- Maximum boat beam: 18 ft 0 in (5.49 m)
- Locks: 2 (originally 2)
- Status: part navigable
- Navigation authority: West Sussex County Council

History
- Date of act: 1819
- Date of first use: 1822
- Date closed: 1928
- Date restored: 1984

Geography
- Start point: Chichester
- End point: Chichester Harbour

The Chichester Canal is a ship canal in England. Partly navigable, its course is essentially intact and runs 3.8 miles (6.1 km) from the sea at Birdham on Chichester Harbour to Chichester through two locks. The canal (originally part of the Portsmouth and Arundel Canal) was opened in 1822 and took three years to build. The canal could take ships of up to 100 long tons (100 t). Dimensions were limited to 85 feet (26 metres) long, 18 feet (5.5 m) wide and a draft of up to 7 feet (2.1 m). As denoted by the suffix -chester, Chichester is a Roman settlement (Noviomagus Reginorum), and 300 Denarii were unearthed when Chichester Basin was formed in the 1820s.

== History ==
=== Planning, construction and early operation ===
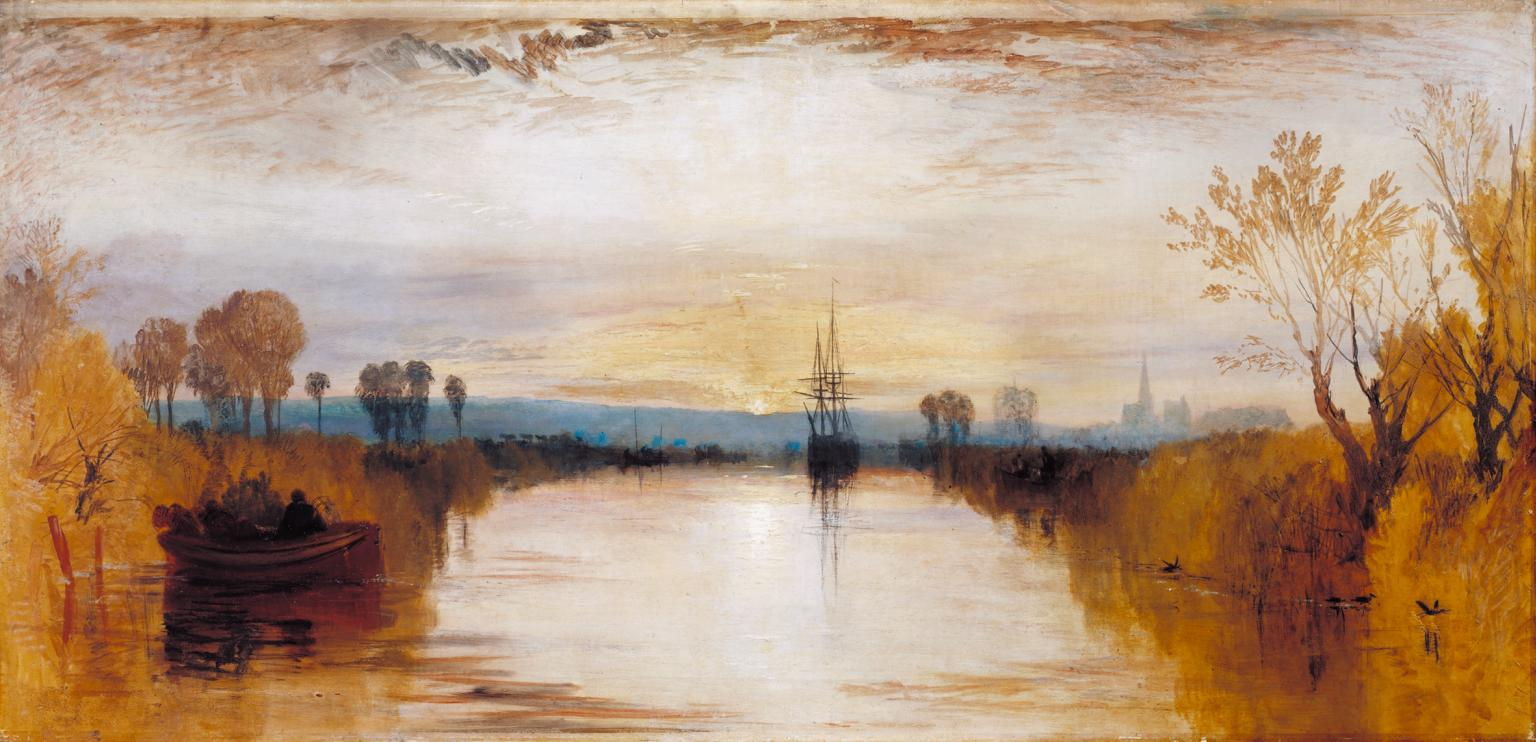
Chichester Canal by J. M. W. Turner

Proposals for a canal linking Chichester directly to the sea go back as least as far as 1584 when an act of Parliament, the Chichester Haven Act 1584 (27 Eliz. 1. c. 22), was passed authorising a cut linking Chichester with the sea. Further proposals were made in the early 19th century, with schemes being proposed in 1801, 1802, 1803 and 1811, but none of these came to pass and as a result the first link to the sea was via a branch of the Portsmouth and Arundel Canal opened in 1822. In 1817 it had been decided that the section between Chichester and Chichester Harbour, unlike the rest of the canal, would be built large enough to carry boats of 100 tons. Putting this into practice required a new act of Parliament, and the Portsmouth and Arundel Navigation and Wey and Arun Junction Canal Act 1819 (59 Geo. 3. c. civ) was obtained on 21 June 1819. In the same year the construction of the Chichester branch began. In digging out of the basin a hoard of 300 Denarii was found. The section of the canal that would become the Chichester Canal was formally opened on 9 April 1822.

The Portsmouth and Arundel Canal was conceived as part of a bigger plan to provide a secure inland canal route from London to Portsmouth, but by the time the route was completed, the war with France had ended. With the reason for its construction removed, the canal was not a commercial success, and apart from the Chichester section, it had fallen into disuse by 1847.

=== Under the ownership of the Corporation of Chichester ===
Chichester Canal Transfer Act 1892
- Act of Parliament
- Parliament of the United Kingdom
- Long title: An Act to provide for the transfer of the Chichester portion of the Portsmouth and Arundel Navigation to the Corporation of the City of Chichester and for other purposes.
- Citation: 55 & 56 Vict. c. cxxxviii

Dates
- Royal assent: 27 June 1892

The canal was transferred to the Corporation of Chichester by the Chichester Canal Transfer Act 1892 (55 & 56 Vict. c. cxxxviii). In November of that year the City Surveyor gave a figure of £1,000 to put the canal back into full working order; key tasks were repair of locks, bridges and the removal of weeds and mud from the channel. By 1898 only 704 tons of goods were carried – tolls for the year were £18. The last recorded commercial traffic was in 1906 when a load of shingle was carried from the Harbour to the basin. In the same year it was found that the swing bridge at Donnington and Birdham needed to be repaired or replaced. Westhampnett Rural District Council wanted to replace them with fixed bridges (which would have blocked the canal) but the Corporation of Chichester wanted to keep the canal open to traffic. By 1923 the corporation appears to have accepted that there would be no further great loads; it authorised and funded fixed bridges.

The canal was officially open for trade until June 1928 before being formally abandoned. In 1932 the section of the canal between Cutfield Bridge and Salterns lock was reopened to allow yachts to be berthed there. The open section was initially leased by D. S. Vernon but in 1934 he transferred it to the Chichester Yacht Company.

=== World War II ===
In Britain in World War II the canal towpath was made an anti-tank and anti-barge route by the 4th Infantry Division (United Kingdom) to militate against a German invasion. This entailed dismantling four swing bridges, diversion of some of the Lavant to raise the water by 3 feet (0.91 m) (thus over the towpath) and a low dam above Cutfield bridge. The partial diversion proved hard to control and the fluctuations damaged the canal and a houseboat; argument as to the duty to compensate lasted until June 1947.

=== Post war ===
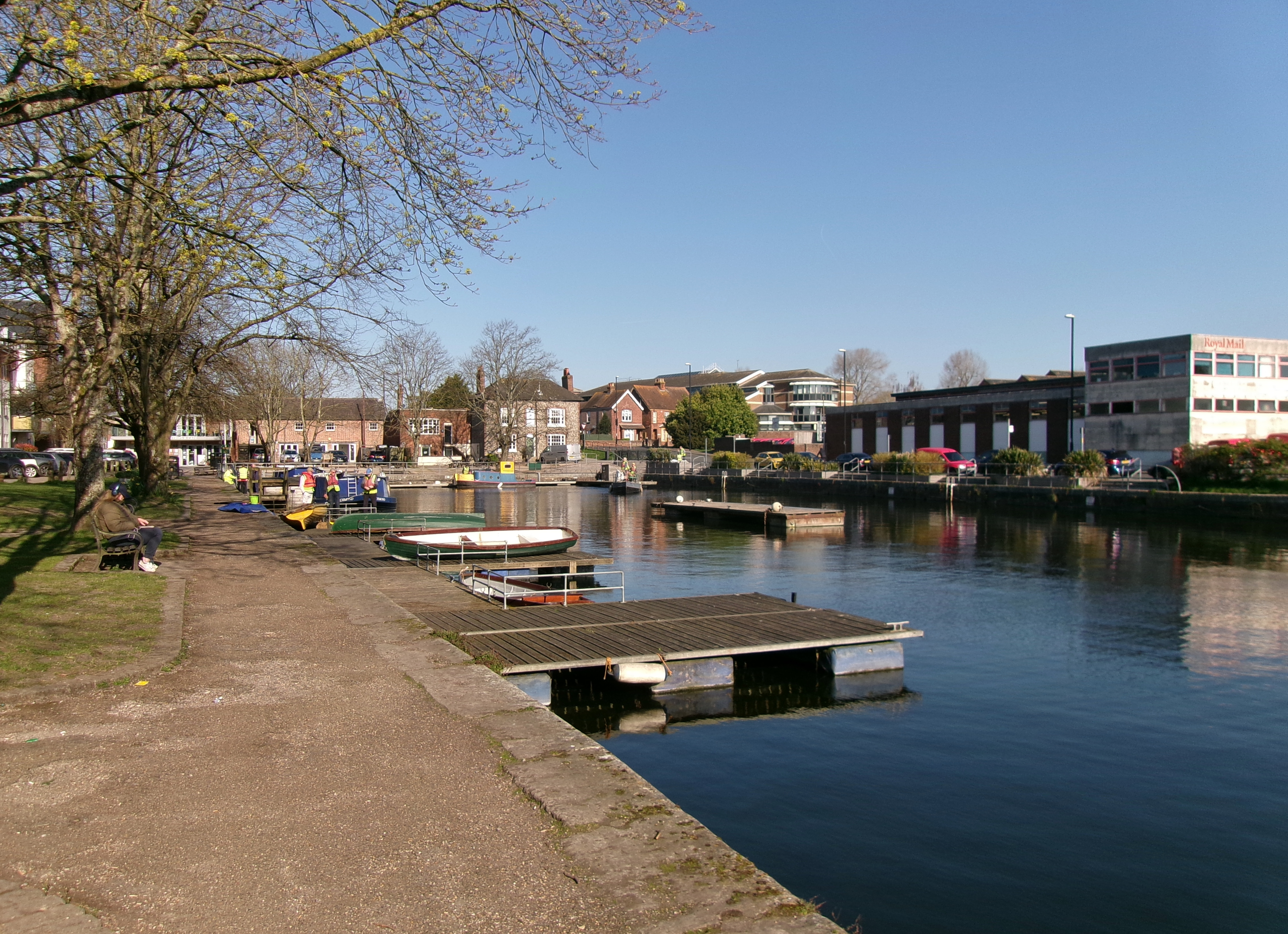
Southgate basin at the Chichester end of the canal in 2025

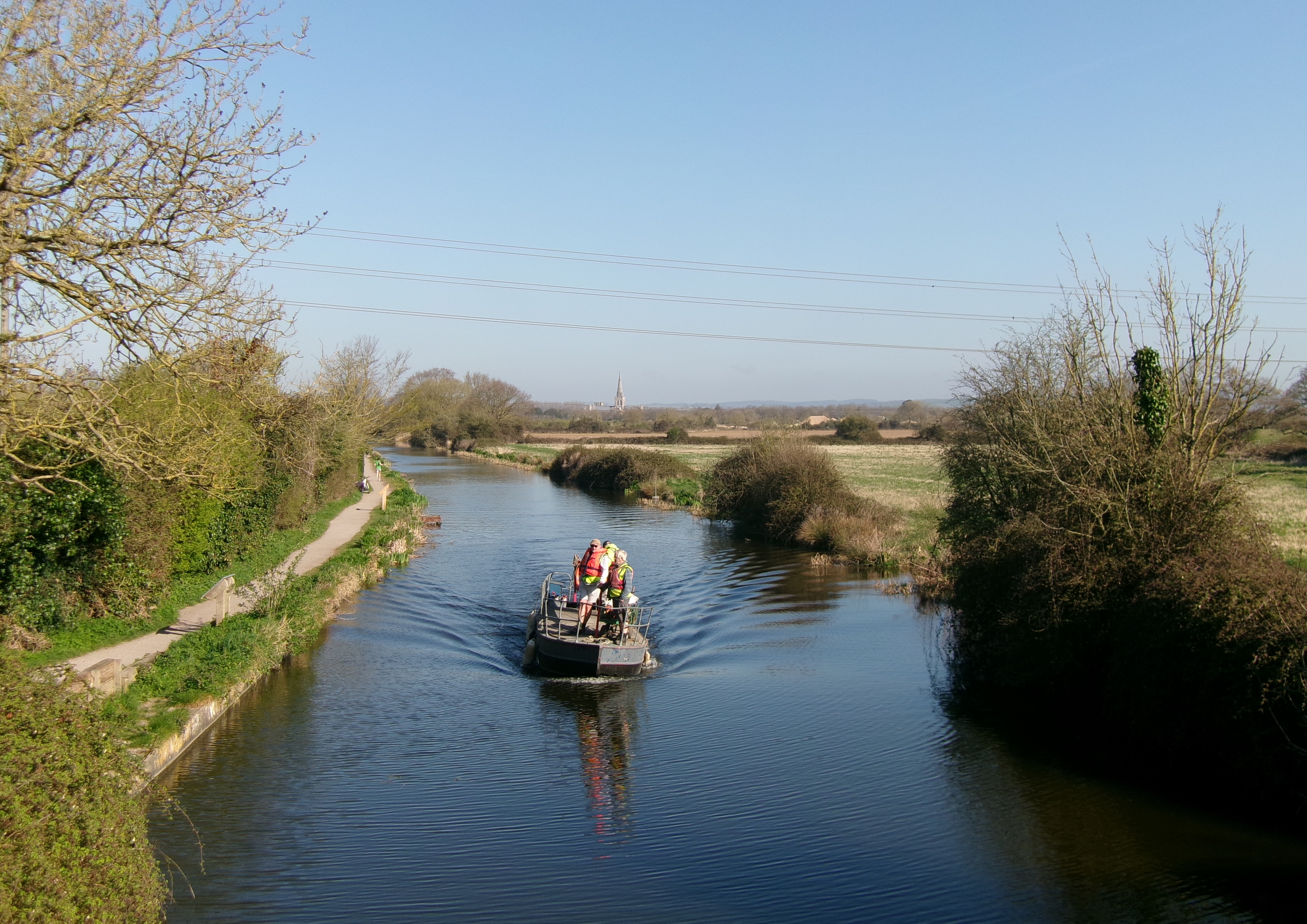
The canal at Hunston in 2025; view north with Chichester cathedral spire visible in the distance

In 1953 the canal and surrounding lands were sold to West Sussex County Council for £7,500. The council let plans be known to use part of the canal for road improvement; on opposition and with higher priority issues for funds, these never took place. The section below Cutfield Bridge continued to be leased to the Chichester Yacht Company while the upper part of the canal was leased to Chichester Canal Angling Association.

The Sussex Canal Trust was formed in July 1973, initially intending to preserve and restore the Portsmouth and Arundel Canal, of which the Chichester Canal was a part. This followed the success of a rally of small boats on the Chichester Canal in June 1973, organised as a response to the dredging of the entrance channel and Chichester Basin by the council. The Portsmouth and Arundel Canal Society renamed itself to the Chichester Canal Society and then the Chichester Ship Canal Trust, to reflect its changing aims. They took over the lease of the upper section from the angling club in 1984, and dredged Chichester Basin, after which they carried on towards Hunston, which they reached in the mid-1990s. This allowed them to run a trip boat called Egremont from 1992, which gave them a steady stream of income.

In 1993, an engineering report on restoring the Portsmouth and Arudel Canal found that there were no problems which could not be solved on the Chichester section, although the remaining section from Ford to Hunston was much more problematic. Floodwaters in lower Chichester were diverted into the canal in January 1994. The Trust had hoped that further development of a flood relief scheme for Chichester would result in more of the canal being restored. As it did not, they talked with the local council and a Central Committee was formed. Their remit was to create a "Chichester Ship Canal Master Plan" to consider how obstacles could be overcome, and to look at how such plans could be implemented. By 2002, dredging had reached Crosbie Bridge, the first of the dropped bridges. With nearly 2 miles (3.2 km) of canal navigable, the Trust bought a second trip boat. Richmond was a wide-beamed boat, suitable for dining cruises and charters, and began operating in 2005. The 1-mile (1.6 km) length between Crosbie Bridge and Cutfield Bridge was too difficult for the volunteers to tackle, and so they paid Land & Water to dredge this section in 2004.

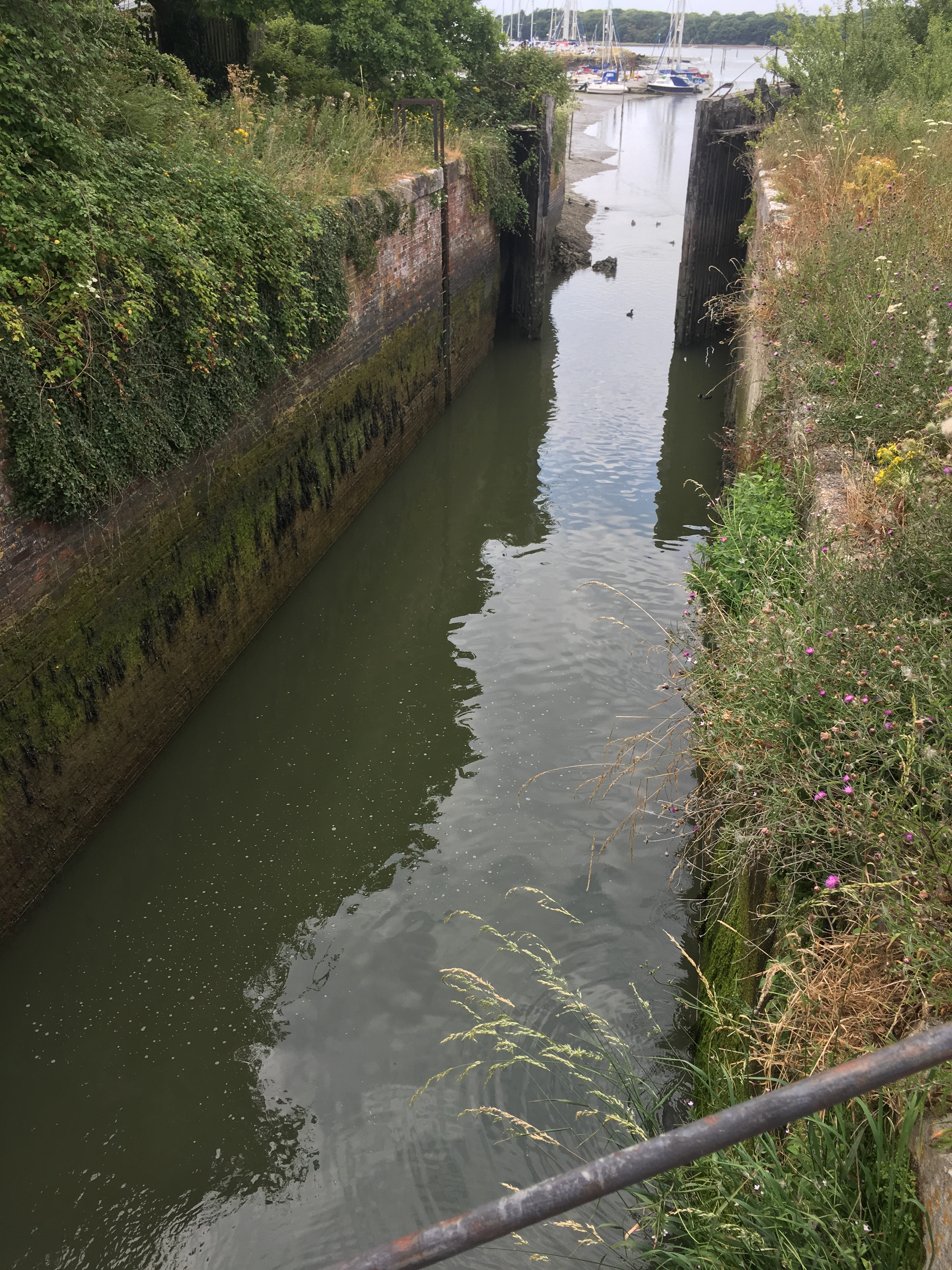
Salterns sea lock

A 2009 restoration of Casher's Lock was halted due to the presence of water voles.

The Trust was awarded a grant of £3,000 in 2021 from the Downs & Harbours Clean Water Partnership, to conduct a biodiversity audit of the canal. It is a designated local wildlife site, providing habitat for some rare and internationally protected species.

== Points of interest ==
| Point | Coordinates (Links to map resources) | OS Grid Ref | Notes |
|---|---|---|---|
| Chichester Basin | 50.8304°N 0.7817°W | SU859041 | |
| Junction with disused Portsmouth and Arundel Canal | 50.8131°N 0.7746°W | SU864022 | |
| Site of Casher Lock | 50.8033°N 0.8126°W | SU837010 | |
| Salterns Lock | 50.8040°N 0.8281°W | SU826011 | Chichester Channel |

== See also ==
- Canals of the United Kingdom
- History of the British canal system

== Bibliography ==
- Denny, Andrew (January 2017). "Chichester Ship Canal". Waterways World. ISSN 0309-1422.
- Green, Alan H.J. (2006). The History of Chichester's Canal. Sussex Industrial Archaeology Society. ISBN 978-0-9512036-1-3.
- Hadfield, Charles (1969). The Canals of South and South East England. David and Charles. ISBN 978-0-7153-4693-8.
- Heneghan, F. D. (1958). The Chichester Canal. Chichester City Council. ASIN B000XCT5Z6.
- Squires, Roger (2008). Britain's restored canals. Landmark Publishing. ISBN 978-1-84306-331-5.
- Vine, P.A.L (1985). West Sussex waterways. Middleton Press. ISBN 978-0-906520-24-6.
- Vine, P.A.L (2005). London's Lost Route to Portsmouth. Phillimore & Co. ISBN 978-1-86077-283-2.
