= Josias Jessop =

English canal engineer

- Born: 26 October 1781
- Died: 30 September 1826 (age 44)
- Engineering career
- Discipline: Civil and canal engineer
- Projects: Bristol Harbour; Wey and Arun Canal; Montgomery Canal (Western Branch); Mansfield and Pinxton Railway; Cromford and High Peak Railway

Josias Jessop (1781–1826) was a canal engineer, and second son of William Jessop, one of the great canal engineers of the late eighteenth and early nineteenth centuries. He was trained by his father, and worked under him on his early projects, but proved his abilities during the construction of Bristol harbour. He became an independent consulting engineer from 1811. He died fourteen years later, a little before he reached the age of 45.

== Early life ==
Jessop was the second son of William and Sarah Jessop, and was presumably born at Fairburn, North Yorkshire, since he was baptised in the church there on 26 October 1781. At the age of two or three, his family moved to Newark-on-Trent, and that remained their base until 1805. His father ensured that Jessop was well trained in the career that he knew well, and they worked together on several schemes, with the father supervising the son. The first such scheme was for the West India Docks, where he acted as assistant engineer to his father from February 1801. His next project was the proposed Croydon, Merstham and Godstone Railway, where both men were appointed as engineers in October 1802. Having drawn up plans and sections, William produced the estimates, but it was Josias who gave evidence in parliament, and an Act of Parliament was obtained as a result in May 1803.

The company failed to raise the full capital required to build the line, and so the Jessops revised the plans to cover the 9 miles (14 km) from Croydon to Merstham. The contract for the construction of the line was awarded to the Butterley Company, which was at the time directed by Benjamin Outram, who managed the project himself. Josias was responsible for setting out the line, and its levels were checked by George Leather as the trackwork proceeded. Outram used subcontractors to construct the earthworks. Although the project was not completed until July 1805, Jessop left in February 1804, to work on the construction of the floating harbour at Bristol. He was required to be there full-time, although he was still officially "under the direction of his father".

The scheme was huge, involving the creation of 2 miles (3.2 km) of new channel for the River Avon, to the south of its existing route, and the impounding of around 70 acres (28 ha) of the original channel to create the largest impounded ship dock in the world at the time. At 200 by 45 feet (61 by 14 m), and with a navigable depth of 34 feet (10 m) at spring tides, the entrance lock was also one of the largest ever built. By the time it was completed, the original estimated cost of £290,000 had risen to £611,000, and although some of this was caused by problems with unstable soil in both the new cut and in the basins, much of the extra cost can be attributed to a series of improvements made as the project progressed. The younger Jessop was solely responsible for the design of the Prince's Bridge, a swing bridge over the entrance to the harbour. This required him to submit estimates to Parliament, and give evidence to support the project to the House of Lords. The bridge was completed at the same time as the main project in May 1809, having cost £14,300. Jessop continued to work for Bristol Harbour until late 1810, overseeing various jobs, including the purchase of a steam dredger. At the end, the Directors expressed their complete confidence in his abilities, stating that he had "acquitted himself in the important trust reposed in him with the most unsullied reputation and honour".

== Consulting engineer ==
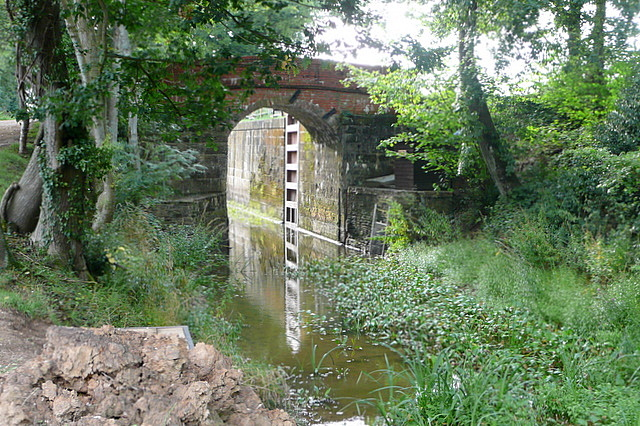
Devil's Hole Lock on Jessop's Wey and Arun Canal

Now aged 30, and with his abilities as an engineer acknowledged, he became an independent consulting engineer. In 1811 he surveyed the route for a canal linking Godalming on the River Wey Navigation to Newbridge on the River Arun. Following the issuing of a report in August and a prospectus in October, he re-surveyed the route, and in May 1812 suggested a revised route, at an estimated cost of £86,000. An Act of Parliament was obtained in April 1813, to authorise an 18.5-mile (29.8 km) canal with 23 locks suitable for 30-ton barges. All of the main structures, including aqueducts, bridges, locks and lock-keepers' cottages were designed by Jessop, and construction was managed by May Upton, the resident engineer. The Wey and Arun Canal project was completed in September 1816, having cost £103,000.

In 1813 he surveyed and planned the Western Branch of the Montgomeryshire Canal. The canal had been opened to Garthmyl in 1797, but had not progressed any further because of a lack of finance. The existing section became known as the Eastern Branch, and Jessop surveyed a 7.5-mile (12.1 km) extension with 6 locks, which ran from Garthmyl to Newtown. His plans were accepted in July 1814, but there were delays in obtaining an Act of Parliament, as a result of opposition to the plans. However, an Act was obtained in 1815, and Jessop oversaw the project between then and 1819, when construction was completed. John Williams was the engineer on site, and the project cost £53,390. Although the construction work was completed in March 1819, it was not reported to be finished until December 1821.

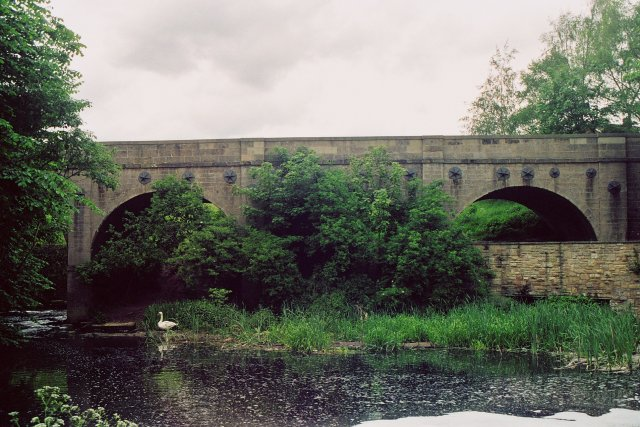
Jessop's five-arched viaduct for the Mansfield and Pinxton Railway

In 1805, Benjamin Outram, the owner of the Butterley Company, died, and the Jessop family moved from Newark to Butterley Hall, so that William Jessop, the younger brother of Josias, could take over as manager of the company. Since 1794 they had manufactured cast iron plate rails for tramways, but in 1813, experimented with I-section edge rails, and Josias used these rails on his next project, an 8-mile (13 km) railway which ran from Mansfield to the Cromford Canal at Pinxton. Construction of the Mansfield and Pinxton Railway was authorised on 16 June 1817, and an opening ceremony was held on 13 April 1819, close to a viaduct which carried the railway over the River Maun at Mansfield. A local newspaper report described it as "the beautiful five-arch bridge, constructed under the direction of Mr. Jessop, the engineer." It was adapted for locomotive traffic in 1847, and is now used as a footpath. It was restored in 1990, and is a grade II listed structure.

Jessop was also consulted on harbour works, recommending an extension to the east pier at Newhaven harbour in 1819, which was completed the following year, while is 1823 and 1826 he reported on Plymouth Breakwater, in the first instance jointly with Thomas Telford, George Rennie and John Rennie, and in the second with William Chapman and John Rennie.

His final project was the Cromford and High Peak Railway, which crossed the Pennines to link the Cromford Canal to the Peak Forest Canal. He surveyed the route in 1824, and proposed a 33-mile (53 km) line, which would use a series of steep inclines powered by stationary steam engines to raise the level by 990 feet (300 m) on the Cromford side, and drop it by 250 feet (76 m) to reach Whaley Bridge. An Act was obtained in May 1825 and construction began, with Thomas Woodhouse as the resident engineer. Woodhouse saw the project through to completion in 1831, after Jessop's death in 1826. The summit tunnel includes a stone inscribed 'Josias Jessop Engineer'.

Some idea of the stature of Jessop as an engineer can be gained from events concerning the proposed Liverpool and Manchester Railway. The original bill had been withdrawn from Parliament in 1825, as George Stephenson's survey was flawed, and his ability to present evidence incompetent. George and John Rennie then prepared a new plan, which resulted in an Act of Parliament being obtained in May 1826, after George Rennie and Jessop gave evidence. The two Rennies were asked to become engineers, but stated that while they were prepared to work with Telford or Jessop, they were not prepared to work with Stephenson. Their offer was refused, and Jessop became consulting engineer on 21 June, with Stephenson becoming principal engineer two weeks later. Despite the initial setback, Stephenson went on to complete the project in 1830, and his reputation as an engineer was established.

Jessop died on 30 September 1826, after a short illness. It was attributed to over-exertion while building the Cromford and High Peak Railway.

== See also ==
- Canals of the United Kingdom
- History of the British canal system

== Bibliography ==
- Hadfield, Charles (1985). The Canals of the West Midlands. David and Charles. ISBN 0-7153-8644-1.
- Priestley, Joseph (1831). Historical Account of the Navigable Rivers, Canals and Railways of Great Britain. Longman, Rees, Orme, Brown & Green.
- Skempton, Sir Alec; et al. (2002). A Biographical Dictionary of Civil Engineers in Great Britain and Ireland: Vol 1: 1500 to 1830. Thomas Telford. ISBN 0-7277-2939-X.
