= List of people from the Metropolitan Borough of Bury =

This is a list of people from the metropolitan borough of Bury in North West England. It includes people from the town of Bury and also people from the towns of Radcliffe, Prestwich, Whitefield, Tottington, Ramsbottom, and other places which together form the Metropolitan Borough of Bury. This list is arranged alphabetically by surname.

== A ==
- David Abrahams (born 1958), Director of Isaac Newton Institute for Mathematical Sciences
- W. Geoffrey Arnott (1930–2010), classics scholar
- Gemma Atkinson (born 1984), actress, model and TV personality; born in Bury

== B ==
- Steve Berry, TV and radio presenter; born and educated in Bury
- Micah Barlow (1873–1936), cricketer; born in Bury
- Tony Binns (born 1948), professor of geography
- Celia Birtwell (born 1941), textile and fashion designer and muse of David Hockney; raised in Prestwich and attended St. Margaret's Primary School
- Black Jackson (formed 2000), alternative rock band
- Cherie Blair (born 1954), barrister; former Prime Minister Tony Blair's wife; born in Bury, moved to Liverpool
- Danny Boyle (born 1956), filmmaker and producer; born in Radcliffe
- Alistair Burt (born 1955), Conservative MP for Bury North, 1983–1997; MP for North East Bedfordshire, 2001–2019
- Gary Burgess (1975-2022), radio presenter and television journalist
- Richard Buxton (1786–1865), botanist; born in Prestwich

== C ==
- Noel Castree (born 1968), author; professor of geography at Manchester University.
- Sir John Charnley (1911–1982), orthopaedic surgeon; hip replacement pioneer; born in Bury
- David Chaytor (born 1949), Labour MP for Bury North 1997–2010; convicted fraudster
- Catherine Chisholm (born 1878 Radcliffe) British physician; first female graduate University of Manchester; key founder Manchester Babies Hospital (opened 1914)
- Antony Cotton (born 1975), British actor, (born Anthony Dunn); plays Sean Tully in Coronation Street
- Walter Clegg (1920–1994), British Conservative politician & MP
- Lol Creme (born 1947), musician with the band 10cc; from Prestwich
- Richmal Crompton (1890–1969), full name Richmal Crompton Lamburn; author of Just William stories
- Cecil Cronshaw (1889–1961), pioneer of modern dyes; Chairman and Director of ICI
- Brian Cubbon (1928–2015), former Permanent Secretary, Home Office and Northern Ireland Office

== D ==
- Jane Danson (born 1978), actor; played Leanne Battersby in Coronation Street, born in Radcliffe and attended Radcliffe High School.
- Victoria Derbyshire (born 1968), journalist and radio presenter; born in Ramsbottom
- Nick Derbyshire (born 1970), cricketer; born in Ramsbottom, brother of Victoria Derbyshire
- Henry Dunster (1609–1659), first president of Harvard College; native of Bury; fourth headmaster of Bury Grammar School prior to his emigration to Massachusetts in 1640

== E ==
- Michael Edelson (born 1944), businessman; Director of Manchester United Football Club
- Elbow (formed 1990), rock band which played its first gig in Bury, previously called Soft.

== F ==
- Sir William Fawcett (1727–1804), Adjutant-General to the Forces; Governor of the Royal Hospital Chelsea
- Francis Fawkes (1720–1777), poet and translator
- Georgia May Foote (born 1991), actress and model, played Katy Armstrong in Coronation Street
- Jenny Frost (born 1978), singer with the band Atomic Kitten; TV presenter; grew up in Prestwich and attended the local Catholic high school, St Monica's
- Liam Frost (born 1983), musician and songwriter; from Prestwich

== G ==
- Guy Garvey (born 1974), lead singer of the band Elbow; lives in Prestwich
- Kevin Godley (born 1945), singer-songwriter with the band 10cc; from Prestwich
- Andy Goram (1964–2022), former Scotland goalkeeper
- David Green (born 1948), film director
- James Guy (born 1995), swimmer; 200m freestyle gold medallist at the 2015 World Long Course Championships

== H ==
- Vivienne Haigh-Wood Eliot (1888–1947), wife of T.S Eliot
- Nellie Halstead (1910–1991), sprinter who competed in the 1932 Summer Olympics; born in Radcliffe
- Reg Harris (1920–1992), professional cyclist; twice Olympic silver medallist; born in Birtle
- Alan Haven (1935–2016), jazz organist; born in Prestwich
- Gordon Hewart, 1st Viscount Hewart (1870–1943), lawyer and politician; Lord Chief Justice
- Andrew Higginson (born 1957), Chairman of Morrisons Supermarkets 2015–
- Sir John Holker (1828–1882), Conservative MP for Preston 1872–1882, Attorney-General, 1875–1880
- Henry Holland (born 1983), fashion designer
- Simon Hopkinson (born 1954), food writer; former chef
- John Horsefield (1792–1854), botanist and handloom weaver; born and lived in Besses o' th' Barn

== J ==
- Howard Jacobson (born 1942), writer; born in Prestwich
- John Just (1797–1852), second Master of Bury Grammar School 1832–52; botanist; lectured at the Royal Manchester School of Medicine and Surgery; honorary professor of botany at the Royal Manchester Institution

== K ==
- John Kay (1704–1780), inventor of the flying shuttle; born in Walmersley
- Robert Kay (1728–1802), inventor of the drop box; son of John Kay
- Simon Kelner (born 1957), editor-in-chief of The Independent, 1998–2008
- Myles Kenyon (1886–1960), captain of Lancashire CCC; High Sheriff of Lancashire; born at Walshaw Hall
- Sir Malcolm Knox (1900–1980), philosopher; Vice-Chancellor of the University of St Andrews, 1953–1966

== L ==
- Frank "Foo Foo" Lammar (1937–2003), drag queen and nightclub owner, lived in Shuttleworth
- Allan Levy (1943–2004), children's rights lawyer; Chairman of the Pindown Enquiry
- Ralf Little (born 1980), actor who appeared in The Royle Family, Two Pints of Lager and a Packet of Crisps and Death in Paradise
- Rico Lewis (born 2004), a professional footballer who currently plays for Manchester City & England

== M ==
- Geoffrey Moorhouse (1931–2009), author and journalist; writer of Hell's Foundations
- Jennie McAlpine (born 1984), long running actress, plays Fiz Brown in Coronation Street
- Elle Mulvaney (born 2002), actress, plays Amy Barlow in Coronation Street

== N ==
- Gary Neville (born 1975), footballer; Manchester United defender and captain; brother of Phil Neville
- Phil Neville (born 1977), footballer; Manchester United star & Everton midfielder and captain; brother of Gary Neville and Tracey Neville
- Tracey Neville (born 1977, netballer, England Netball coach; twin sister of Phil Neville
- Roy Newsome (1930–2011), conductor, composer, arranger, and broadcaster
- Amanda Noar (born 1962), actress

== P ==
- Trevor Park (1927–1995), Labour MP for South East Derbyshire, 1964–1970
- Laurence Pearl (born 1956), biochemist and structural biologist
- Sir Robert Peel (1788–1850), Prime Minister of the United Kingdom; born at Chamber Hall, Bury
- Arlene Phillips (born 1943), choreographer; born in Prestwich

== R ==
- Mary Reibey (1777–1855), a prominent Australian merchant and shipowner, transported there as a convict
- Lisa Riley, (born 1976) actress, played Mandy Dingle in Emmerdale
- Paul Rose (1935–2015), Labour MP for Manchester Blackley, 1964–1979; barrister and writer

== S ==
- Pat Sanderson (born 1977), rugby union player who played for Sale Sharks, Harlequins and Worcester Warriors; won 16 caps for the English national team and was an England captain
- Suzanne Shaw (born 1981), real name Suzanne Crowshaw, member of popgroup Hear'Say; later star of West End shows and TV presenter
- Peter Skellern (1947–2017), singer-songwriter; born in Bury
- Barry Smith (born 1952), ontologist, profoessor of philosophy, biomedical informatics, and computer science
- Dodie Smith (1896–1990), novelist and playwright; writer of 101 Dalmatians; born in Whitefield
- Mark E. Smith (1957–2018), musician and frontman of The Fall; lifelong resident of Prestwich
- John Spencer (1935–2006), snooker player; British champion three times; born in Radcliffe
- Julie Stevens (born 1936), actress; appeared in episodes of TV series The Avengers, Playschool and Playaway; born in Prestwich
- William Sturgeon (1783–1850), physicist and inventor; created the first practical electric motor and electromagnetic solenoid; lived in Prestwich and is buried in St Mary's Cemetery
- Rhian Sugden (born 1986) model and personality, born in Radcliffe

== T ==
- Betty Tebbs (1918–2017), trades unionist, peace campaigner, women's rights campaigner
- Thomas Thompson (1880-1951), writer
- Dame Janet Thornton (born 1949), bioinformatics researcher
- David Trippier (born 1946), Conservative MP for Rossendale, 1979–1983, MP for Rossendale and Darwen, 1983–1992
- Kieran Trippier, (born 1990), international professional footballer who has played for Burnley and Tottenham before moving to Atletico Madrid in Spain and has played for England at the World Cup and euros, He went to Woodhey High school.

== U ==
- Emma Jane Unsworth (born 1979), author of short stories; grew up in Prestwich and has also lived there as an adult

== W ==
- Ian Wallace (1946–2007), professional musician; drummer with progressive rock band King Crimson, his first group, the Jaguars, was formed in Bury with school friends
- Walter Whitehead (1840–1913), surgeon; President of the British Medical Association in 1902
- James Wood (1760–1839), mathematician; Dean of Ely Cathedral; born in Holcombe
- Victoria Wood (1953–2016), comedian, actress, singer and writer; born in Prestwich
- Jeff Wootton (born 1987), guitarist for Gorillaz, Damon Albarn and Liam Gallagher
- Richard Wroe (1641–1718), Warden of the Collegiate Church of St Mary, St Denys and St George in Manchester, 1684–1718
- James Worrall (1914–2011), Canadian Olympic Flag-Bearer; former IOC member and president of the Canadian Olympic Committee; Canada's Sports Hall of Fame and Order of Canada recipient.

== Y ==
- Adam Yates (born 1992), cyclist, third at the 2023 Tour de France, twin brother of Simon Yates
- Simon Yates (born 1992), cyclist, winner of 2018 Vuelta a Espana; twin brother of Adam Yates

== See also ==
- List of people from Greater Manchester
