= Children's Bureau =

The Children's Bureau may refer to:

- The United States Children's Bureau, a U.S. federal agency created in 1912 to promote the health and well-being of children and mothers.
- The National Children's Bureau, a London-based charity exploring a range of issues involving children.
- The Children's Bureau (Taiwan), an agency under the Ministry of the Interior (Republic of China) for child welfare and protection.
