= Barbara Kahan =

British social worker (1920–2000)

- Born: Barbara Joan Langridge; 18 March 1920; Horsted Keynes, England
- Died: 6 August 2000 (aged 80); John Radcliffe Hospital, England
- Education: Newnham College, Cambridge, University of Cambridge; London School of Economics
- Occupation: Social worker
- Spouse: Vladimir Leon Kahan

Barbara Joan Kahan OBE (née Langridge; 18 March 1920 – 6 August 2000) was a British social worker. She rose to chair the National Children's Bureau and to co-chair the Pindown Enquiry.

== Description ==
Kahan was born in Horsted Keynes in 1920. Her parents, Alfred George and Emily Kathleen Langridge were Methodists and keen on reading. Her father was to become a railway station master. Her family believed in working for their community but it was at Barbara's prompting that she gained an adopted sister who was a Jewish girl escaping persecution in Europe.

Kahan studied English literature at Newnham College, Cambridge between 1939 and 1942, where she was active in politics. She then studied for the Diploma in Social Science at the London School of Economics. She became a factory inspector in 1943.

The Children Act 1948 created the role of "Children's Officer" and Kahan was appointed to one of these new roles in Dudley. As part of her work she opened their first Children's Home before moving to Oxford after two years.

In 1955 she married the psychologist Vladimir Kahan. In 1981 she became a "widow and a workaholic." In 1984 she began to chair the National Children's Bureau.

The Pindown Inquiry was launched by Staffordshire County Council to investigate an aggressive behaviour management policy of children in their care. The investigation was co-chaired by the children's advocate Allan Levy QC LLB and Kahan who was then chair of the National Children's Bureau) in 1990 and 1991. The inquiry, the first into residential care, led to the Quality Protects initiative, launched by the Department of Health in 1998, which sought to improve a range of childcare services.

Her friendship with Levy (whom she had not known before the inquiry) continued until her death, whilst Levy went on to chair the Vladimir and Barbara Kahan Trust. Kahan died in John Radcliffe Hospital in 2000.

== Bibliography ==
Allan Levy QC; Barbara Kahan (1991). The Pindown Experience and the Protection of Children (PDF). Stafford: Staffordshire County Council. p. 167. Archived from the original (PDF) on 2016-11-24.
