= Bury Grammar School =

School in Greater Manchester, England

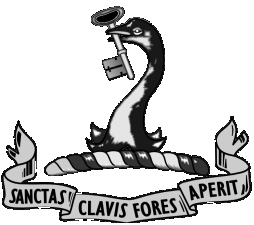
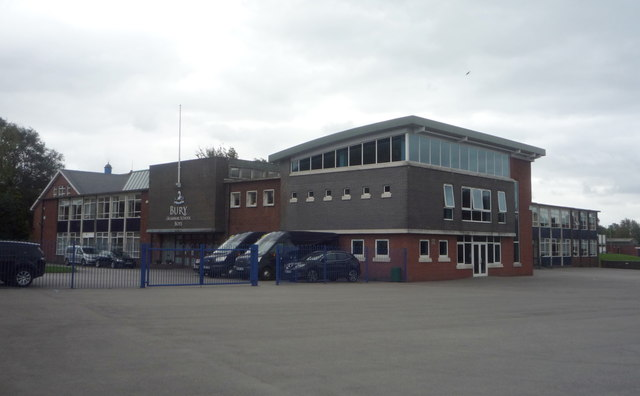
- School crest (known as The Irwell Duck) Bury Grammar School for Boys building

Location
- Tenterden Street; Bury, Greater Manchester, BL9 0HN; England; 53.591026°N 2.303593°W

Information
- Type: Private day school Grammar school
- Motto: Latin: Sanctas Clavis Fores Aperit (The key that opens sacred doors)
- Religious affiliation: Church of England
- Established: c. 1570; 456 years ago
- Department for Education URN: 105373 Tables
- Chair of Governors: Richard Smyth
- Principal: Jo Anderson
- Gender: Boys
- Age: 3 to 18
- Capacity: 1150 pupils
- Houses: Derby, Howlett, Hulme, Kay
- Publication: The Clavian
- Pupils: Clavians
- Old Boys: Old Clavians
- Website: http://www.burygrammar.com

Bury Grammar School is a 3–18 private day school for boys in Bury, Greater Manchester, England, that has existed since c.1570. It is now part of a group of schools for preschool, junior, senior and sixth form studies.

Since 2017, when Bury Grammar School (Boys) and Bury Grammar School (Girls) amalgamated, Jo Anderson has been the first principal of the School and is a member of the Headmasters' and Headmistresses' Conference.

== History ==
=== Establishment ===
There is evidence that a grammar school attached to Bury Parish Church existed as early as 1570 but the school was certainly well established by 1634 with Henry Dunster as its fourth recorded headmaster. Former headmaster, Rev'd Henry Bury, who was by then "aged eighty nine yeares or thereabout", wrote his will in that year. In it, he not only left the sum of twenty shillings to Dunster ("that studious and painfull minister") but also an endowment of £300 to the "free school" at Bury "for and towards the yearlie mentayninge of a school maister there, for to teach their children."

Rev'd Roger Kay had gained his BA in 1688, his MA in 1691 and had become a Fellow of St John's College, Cambridge. He also later became Rector of Fittleton in Wiltshire and was a prebendary of Salisbury until his death. In 1726, he left money in his will to support the library at St John's College, but also a substantial part of his estate to re-founding his alma mater in his home town of Bury. The building in which Kay's newly re-founded school educated the boys of Bury still stands today, known as Blackburn Hall, in the Wylde behind the Parish Church. (The hall is named after a former Rector of Bury, Ven. Foster Blackburne MA(Oxon), who was also Archdeacon of Manchester and Chairman of Governors of Bury G S. Archdeacon Blackburn was credited with producing the lyrics for a school song. It is not used as the official school song today.)

=== Expansion ===
The school outgrew its premises and, in 1903, the boys moved into the completed half of a new building on Tenterden Street, with playing fields across Bridge Road. The new buildings, of Accrington brick, were designed in a simple Neo-Renaissance style by William Venn Gough. (The playing fields were a bone of contention from the first. One writer noted in an early edition of "The Clavian" that "the young folks of Bury refused to recognize our right to the ground".

The boys were soon joined by the girls of the Bury Girls' High School, newly re-founded as Bury Grammar School for Girls. The two schools, whilst remaining separate entities, shared the same building until the erection of a more modern facility for the boys across Bridge Road in the 1960s. This new boys' school was built on the playing fields, so the Governors purchased c.13.8 hectares (34 acres) of land at Buckley Wells for new playing fields. When a new courthouse was completed on Tenters Street, the Magistrates' Court and County Court vacated their former building on Tenterden Street. The Prep Department of the boys' school moved across the road from the 1960s building into the refurbished old courthouse.

=== Direct grant grammar school ===
The school was a direct grant grammar school from 1944 until the abolition of the direct grant system in 1976, when it became fully independent once again. The school celebrated the 250th anniversary of its re-founding by Roger Kay with a visit from Prince Philip on 19 November 1976.

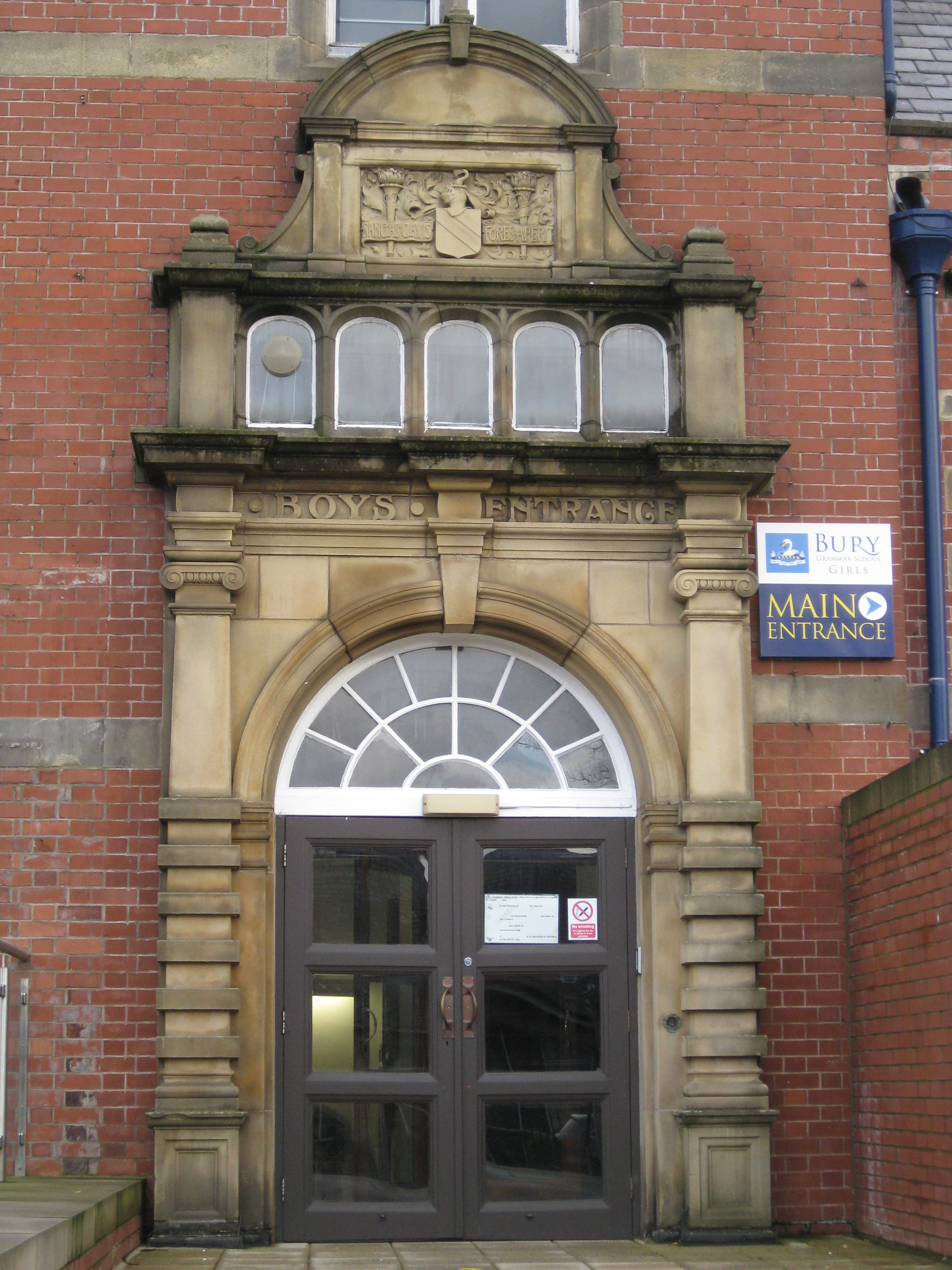
The former boys' entrance, now an entrance to the girls' school

Bury Grammar Schools celebrate their Founders' Day on the Friday closest to 6 May (the Feast of St John before the Latin Gate), the date on which Roger Kay specified the Trustees should meet annually to inspect the schools. The Eucharist is celebrated in the Parish Church and, later in the morning, a procession leads from the school through the main streets of Bury to the Parish Church, led by the Combined Cadet Force (CCF). Since the CCF (founded 1892) is attached to the Lancashire Fusiliers, a regiment with the Freedom of the Borough, the cadets are permitted to march with "swords drawn, drums beating and colours flying". After a commemoration service, the pupils are awarded a half-holiday. Services for younger pupils are held simultaneously in the boys' school hall, the boys' preparatory school and the Roger Kay Hall (in the girls' school).

=== Headmasters ===
Recorded Headmasters of Bury Grammar School
Rev'd Henry Bury	MA	c.1600	
Rev'd Mr Johnson	MA	1617	1622
Rev'd Mr Hoyle	MA	1622	1630
Rev'd Henry Dunster	MA(Cantab)	1630	1640
Rev'd William Ingham	MA	1640	1649
Rev'd James Livesy	MA	1649	1650
Rev'd Peter Bradshaw	MA	1650	1653
Rev'd William Aspinwall	MA	1653	1656
Rev'd Thomas Lawton	MA	1662	1668
Rev'd William Richardson	MA	1669	1677
Rev'd James Kay	MA	1677	1678
Rev'd John Duckworth	MA	1678	1680
Rev'd Timothy Dobson	MA	1680	1684
Rev'd Thomas Boardman	MA	1694	1716
Rev'd Thomas Rider	MA	1716	1724
Rev'd William Smith	MA	1725	1727
Rev'd James Andrew	MA	1728	1730
After Kay's Re-Founding
Rev'd John Lister	MA	1730	1749
Rev'd Richard Barton	MA	1749	1768
Rev'd Francis Hodgson	MA	1768	1818
Rev'd Edward Bushby	MA	1818	1819
Rev'd Richard Hood	MA	1820	1823
Rev'd Henry Crewe Boutflower	MA	1823	1858
Rev'd Charles Frederick Hildyard	MA	1858	1876
Rev'd Edward Hale Gulliver	MA	1877	1879
Rev'd William Henry Howlett	MA	1879	1919
Leonard Ralph Strangeways	MA(Oxon); Scholar of New College	1919	1936
Lionel Cornwallis Lord	MA(Cantab); Scholar of Emmanuel College	1937	1946
Richard Lionel Chambers	MA(Cantab); Scholar of Pembroke College	1946	1951
John Robertson Murray Senior	MA(Oxon); Scholar of Christ Church	1951	1956
Charles Lionel Hall	BSc Econ(Lond) FRGS	1956	1960
John Talbot Hansford	MA(Cantab); Scholar of St John's College	1960	1969
(William) John Hurlston Robson	MA(Oxon); Scholar of St John's College	1969	1990
Keith Richards	MA(Cantab) PGCE; Scholar of Sidney Sussex College	1990	2006
Rev'd Steven C Harvey	MA(Oxon)	2006	2013
Richard N Marshall	MSc NPQH	2013	2017
Devin Cassidy		2017	2023

=== Notable masters ===
- Henry Dunster (1609–1659), first president of Harvard College. A native of Bury and Old Clavian, he was the fourth headmaster of the school prior to his emigration to Massachusetts in 1640.
- John Just (1797–1852), Second Master 1832–52. A noted botanist, he lectured at the Royal Manchester School of Medicine and Surgery, and was honorary professor of botany at the Royal Manchester Institution.

== Overview ==
=== Crest ===
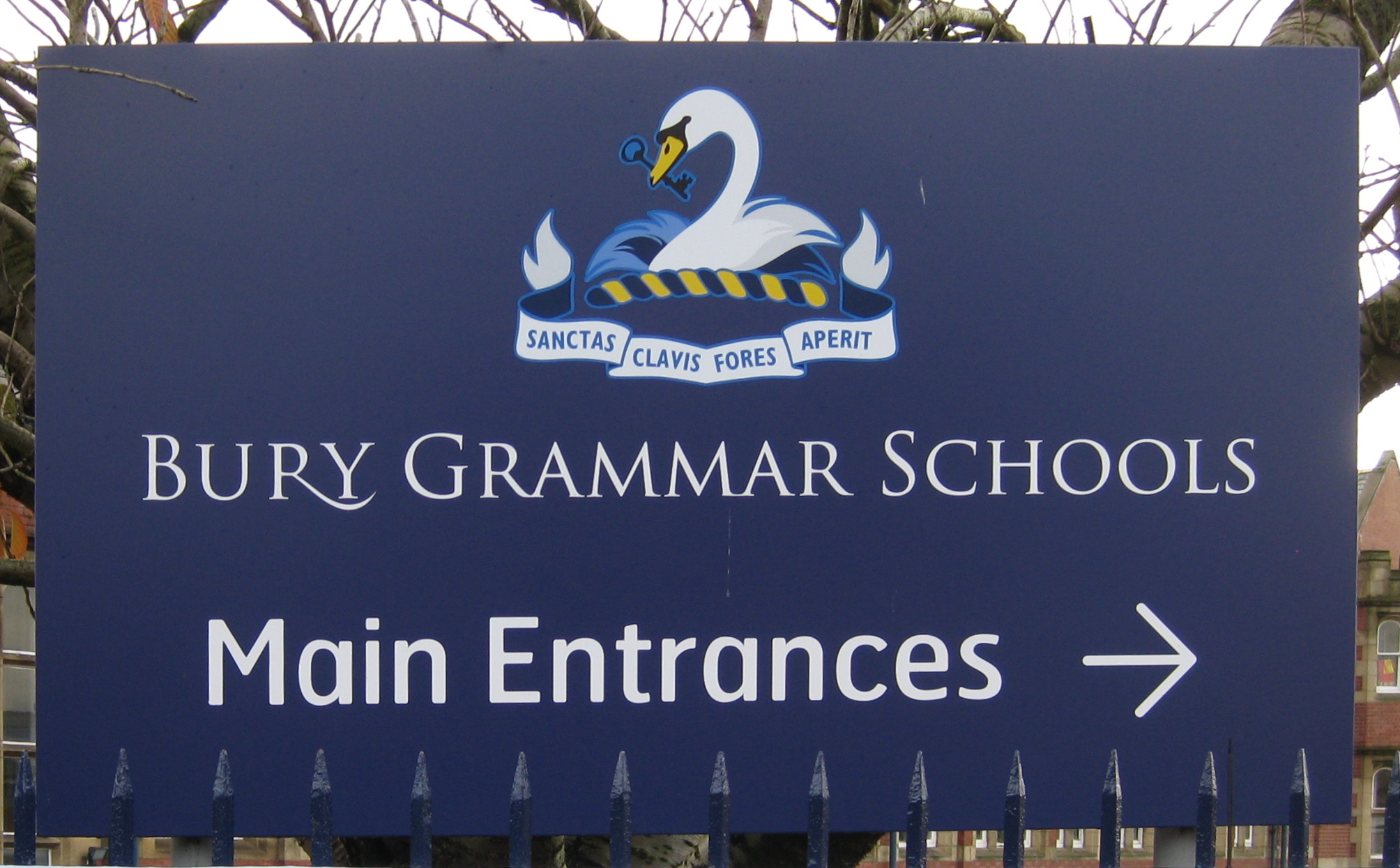
School sign showing the crest

The school's crest dates from c.1840. It depicts a swan holding a key in its beak, under which is the motto in Latin: sanctas clavis fores aperit (English: The key opens sacred doors). Both are considered to have been created by Rev'd Henry Crewe Boutflower, headmaster 1823–58. The tenacious swan was used by John, Duke of Berry in the manuscripts known as the Très Riches Heures. Berry may have been an ancestor of Henry Bury, but was more likely chosen due to the similarity in their names, whilst the key is believed to be a play on the name of the re-founder, Roger Kay.

In a letter to the editor in the first edition of the Bury Grammar School Magazine of September 1881, a correspondent asked:

Will you kindly inform me what creature owns the head that figures as the school crest? Is it an ostrich, swan, snake, or do you think it is a mythical bird? Also, can you tell me why it was adopted as the school crest? Truly yours, PUZZLED

The following edition carried a reply:

In answer to the query of Puzzled in your last issue, I may state, that I have it on the authority of a celebrated local ornithologist that the creature with the key between its teeth is a faithful representation of the head and part of the neck of the once famous Irwell Duck. This rara avis, which in days gone by was found on the banks of that clear and crystal stream from which it takes its name, was celebrated for its pilfering habits. The engraving represents the identical duck, which, it is supposed, abstracted the key from the lock of the Sacred Door; it subsequently alighted on the Island where, quite overcome by the weight of its burden, it was captured in a fainting condition and borne off to the Grammar School, where it immediately expired, still however gripping the key with a death-like tenacity. So struck were the assembled trustees by the determination of the noble bird, that they forthwith resolved that the present arms should be adopted. Yours respectfully, O. K.

Thus began references to the tenacious swan of Bury as The Irwell Duck.

=== Harvard College and Henry Dunster Society ===
The Henry Dunster Society, an organisation inaugurated at Harvard University in September 2008, is intended to bring together former pupils of the Bury Grammar Schools and to support initiatives for the schools. Henry Dunster was a pupil of Bury Grammar School, and then a student at Magdalene College, Cambridge. He became the curate of Bury Parish Church, and then the fourth headmaster of the school. He emigrated to Massachusetts in 1640 and was appointed the first president of Harvard College, now Harvard University.

=== School fees ===
The school fees in 2021 were £10,992 p.a. for senior pupils and £8,193 p.a. in the junior school.

=== Curriculum and attainment ===
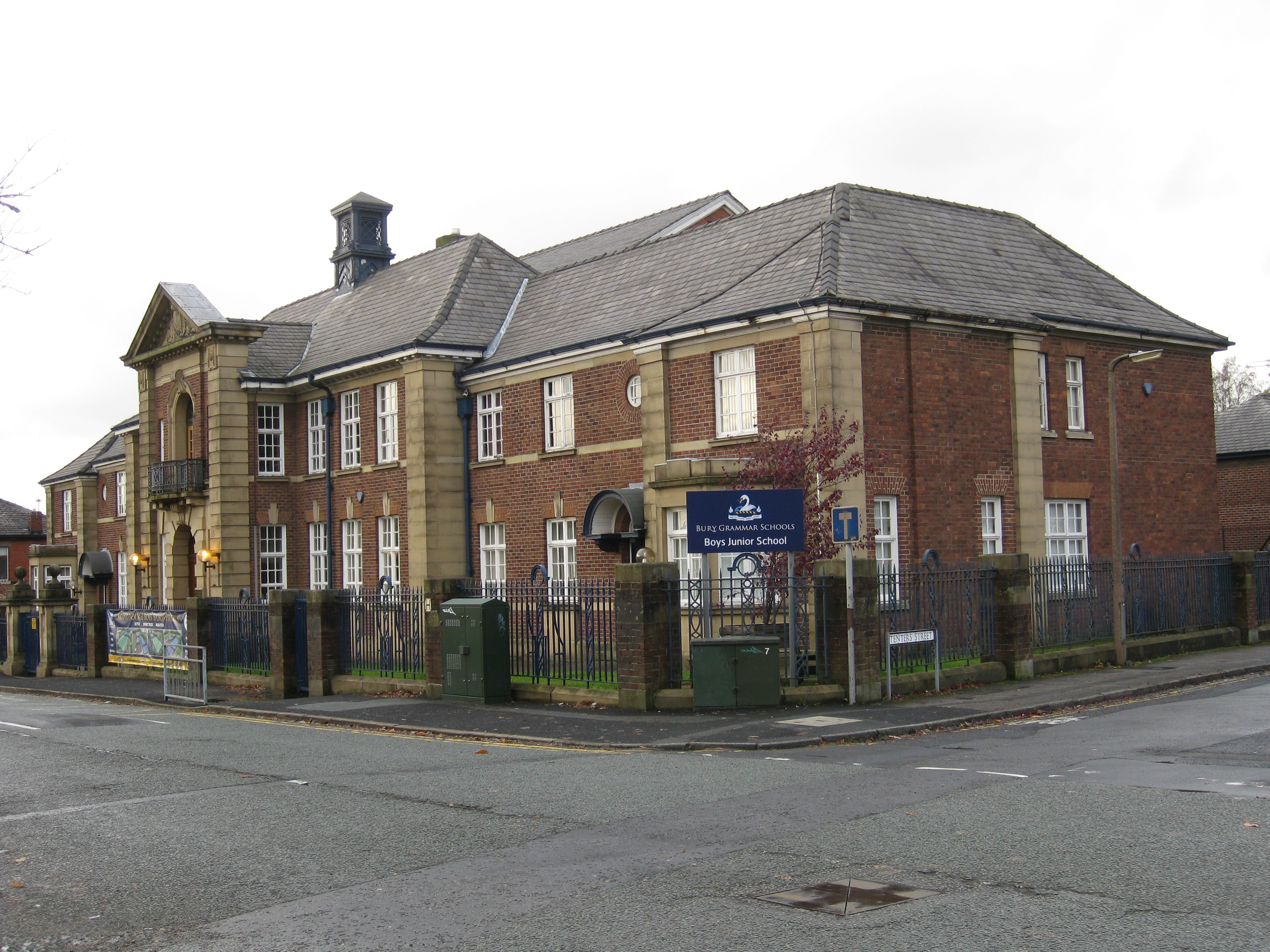
Junior School

Boys in the prep school, housed in its own building across Tenterden Street, study the subjects of the National Curriculum – the core subjects of English, mathematics and general science, together with art, DT, geography, history, ICT, French, music, PSHEE and RS. In addition, all boys have PPE, Swimming and Games on their timetable.

All boys study English language, English literature, maths and chemistry, biology and physics as individual subjects. Boys must also take either French, German or Spanish. Latin used to be compulsory in the first, second and third forms. In addition to these compulsory subjects, boys opt for a combination of other subjects from a range including art, business studies, electronics, geography, history, ICT, music, PE and RS.

GCSE examinations are taken in the 5th Year, including French, German and Spanish. Pupils sit the IGCSE mathematics, English language and English literature examinations, administered by Edexcel. Subsequently, the media report the school as having a 0% pass rate at GCSE in maths and English, since IGCSEs are not counted as GCSE passes by the Office for National Statistics.

Having successfully completed their GCSEs in the 5th year, boys may opt to stay on into the 6th form for a further two years. Sixth form teaching offers study towards 'A' level in all of the subjects offered at GCSE, along with geology, economics, further maths, philosophy, politics and psychology (which is taught in the girls' school).

== Extra curricular ==
=== Sport ===
PE and games lessons are part of every boy's timetable, but there is a range of opportunities for extra curricular sport in the school. Sports offered include Association football, athletics, badminton, basketball, cricket, fencing, hockey, gymnastics, Rugby football and tennis. The school has a swimming pool and a large sports hall with weights room. Summer 2016 saw the addition of a series of all-weather playing surfaces between the sports hall and the river. Boys play competitively both in inter-house competitions and in extramural matches, as well as sending representatives to regional and national teams, such as the ISFA.

=== Performing arts ===
The school has a long tradition of musical and dramatic performance, with performances of Oliver Goldsmith's She Stoops to Conquer noted in The Clavian of 1912 whilst a "little musical programme was put together" for a "Kay House Social" in July of the same year. The 1974 production of Dry Rot, starring John Darling and Piggy Hyde, was the favourite of that decade. Today, the school has a full spectrum of musical groups including a brass ensemble, senior and junior choirs, a concert band, an orchestra and a percussion group. The CCF has a corps of drums. Dramatic productions include both junior and senior plays, and musical productions; such performances are often produced in conjunction with the girls' school, and in recent years have included Guys and Dolls, Les Miserables, Little Shop of Horrors and Jesus Christ, Superstar.

=== Clubs and societies ===
The first debating society was established at the school in 1907. There is a range of societies available to the Clavian of today including the ever-present chess club, photography club and debating society.

=== Publications and alumni activities ===
There are extant copies of a school magazine dating back as far as 1881. The current magazine (The Clavian) began as a termly in-house pamphlet in 1906 and is now an annual publication. "The Key" is a magazine produced for Alumni and friends of the school by the Development Office.

There is an active alumni group run by the Development Office and membership of the Bury Grammar Schools' Alumni Group on LinkedIn is open to Old Clavians (and Old Claviennes) who are LinkedIn members.

The Old Boys' Society has long held an Annual Dinner; the first recorded such dinner took place on 12 September 1881, after the Old Clavians -v- 1st XI cricket match. (Toasts included "The Bishop and Clergy", "The Army, Navy and Auxiliary Forces" and "The Masters".) The OBS today still organises an annual dinner, held at the school on Founders' Day each year. The Old Boys' Society (London Branch) organises an annual dinner in London for Home Counties-based Old Boys. Previously held on 6 May annually, in recent years it has moved to a Friday later in May.

The society also runs several sports teams for Old Clavians, including an association football club that fields four teams; 1st XI, Reserves, 3rd XI and Veterans.

== Notable Old Clavians ==
Name	Born	Died	Notes
Richard Wroe	1641	1718	Warden of the Collegiate Church of St Mary, St Denys and St George in Manchester 1684–1718
Francis Fawkes	1720	1777	Poet and translator
Sir William Fawcett	1727	1804	Adjutant-General to the Forces; Governor of the Royal Hospital Chelsea
James Wood	1760	1839	Mathematician; Master of St John's College, Cambridge 1815–1839; Dean of Ely 1820–1839
Sir Robert Peel Bt	1788	1850	Prime Minister 1834–1835, 1841–1846
Sir John Holker	1828	1882	Conservative MP for Preston 1872–1882; Attorney-General, (1875–1880)
Walter Olivey	1860	1880	Hero of the 2nd Afghan War; the last British Officer to be killed in action while carrying the Queen's Colours.
Brigadier General Rev'd; Arthur Venables Calveley Hordern CMG CBE	1866	1946	Chaplain of Ladysmith during the siege; served in the Boer War and WWI; mentioned in despatches six times, including at Gallipoli; Chaplain General
Gordon Hewart, 1st Viscount Hewart	1870	1943	Solicitor General 1916–1919; Attorney General 1919–1922; Lord Chief Justice of England 1922–1940
Sir Henry Jackson, 1st Baronet	1875	1937	Conservative MP for Wandsworth Central 1924–29 and 1931–37
Cecil Cronshaw	1889	1961	Pioneer of modern dyes, chairman and director of ICI
Sir Malcolm Knox	1900	1980	Philosopher and Vice-Chancellor of the University of St Andrews 1953–1966
Sir John Charnley	1911	1982	Orthopaedic surgeon
Walter Clegg	1920	1994	British Conservative politician
Donald Jack	1924	2003	Canadian novelist and playwright
Trevor Park	1927	1995	Labour MP for South East Derbyshire 1964–1970
Brian Cubbon	1928	2015	Former Permanent Secretary, Home Office and Northern Ireland Office
W. Geoffrey Arnott	1930	2010	Classics scholar
Geoffrey Moorhouse	1931	2009	Author and journalist; writer of Hell's Foundations
Rodney Loudon	1934	2022	Eminent Professor of Theoretical Physics; of Quantum Theory of Light
Paul Rose	1935	2015	Labour MP for Manchester Blackley 1964–1979; barrister and writer
Allan Levy QC	1943	2004	Children's rights lawyer; chairman of the Pindown Enquiry
Michael Edelson	1944	–	Businessman; director of Manchester United Football Club.
Sir David Trippier	1946	–	Conservative MP for Rossendale 1979–1983; MP for Rossendale and Darwen 1983–1992
Ian Wallace	1946	2007	Musician; drummer with King Crimson, Don Henley, Bob Dylan and others. His first group, the Jaguars, was formed in Bury with school friends
Geoffrey Shindler	1947	–	Co-founder of the law firm, Lane-Smith & Shindler; president of the Society of Trusts and Estate Practitioners Worldside in 2007
David Green	1948	–	Film director
David Chaytor	1949	–	Labour MP for Bury North 1997–2010; convicted fraudster
Simon Hopkinson	1954	–	Chef; writer of "Roast Chicken and Other Stories"
Alistair Burt	1955	–	Conservative MP for Bury North 1983–1997; MP for North East Bedfordshire 2001–2019
Simon Kelner	1957	–	Editor-in-chief of The Independent 1998–2008
Andrew Higginson	1957	–	Chairman of JD Sports Group 2022–
Phil Kelly	1963	–	Rock climber; author
Michael Purtill	1966	–	Hotelier
Philip Collins	1967	–	British journalist, academic, banker and speechwriter to Prime Minister Tony Blair, and Director of the Social Market Foundation
Edward Lord	1972	–	Politician; Member of the Court of Common Council of the City of London; Chairman of Local Partnerships LLP
Pat Sanderson	1977	–	Former professional rugby union player for Sale Sharks, Harlequins and Worcester Warriors; former England RUFC captain with 16 England caps
Henry Holland	1983	–	Fashion designer
Jeff Wootton	1987	–	Guitarist for Gorillaz, Damon Albarn and Liam Gallagher
Marcus Holness	1988	–	Former professional footballer for Rochdale, Burton Albion and Tranmere Rovers.
Luke Simpson	1994	–	Former Professional footballer for Oldham Athletic F.C., Watford F.C. and Kidderminster Harriers F.C.

== See also ==
- Bury Grammar School (Girls)
- Hulme Trust
