= Paul Ennals =

Sir Paul Martin Ennals, CBE is Chair of the Northumbria Healthcare Trusthttps://www.northumbria.nhs.uk. He was Chair of the Safeguarding Children Partnerships in South Tyneside, Gateshead and Sunderland until 2020. He also chaired the three Safeguarding Adult Boards in the same local authority areas. He chairs the North of England Climate Coalition (NEECCo). He is President of the Voluntary Organisations Network North East (VONNE) https://www.vonne.org.uk He chairs Fareshare Northeast https://www.vonne.org.uk He is vice chair of Ways to Wellness Foundation.

He was previously chief executive of the United Kingdom's National Children's Bureau, a post he took up in 1998, having previously been director of education and employment for the RNIB. He was vice-chairman of the government's National Advisory Group on Special Educational Needs (SEN) from 1997 to 2001, chairman of the Council for Disabled Children from 1993 to 1998, and founder chairman of the Special Educational Consortium. He was founding Chair of the End Child Poverty Coalition (ECPC).

In 2000 he chaired an independent review of pre-schools and playgroups funded by the Department for Education and Skills (DfES). He chaired the DfES/Department of Health working group which produced the guidance on disabled children aged birth to three years Together from the Start in 2002 – the precursor to the Early Support Programme. He served on the Department of Health Strategy Group for the Children's National Service Framework, and chaired the group which produced the core standards. In 2003 he chaired the Task Group making recommendations on children and young people for the Public Health White Paper.

He was chairman of the non-departmental public body Children's Workforce Development Council from 2009 until its closure in 2012. CWDC represented the interests of employers and employees working with children in early years, social care, and related settings.

He was knighted in the 2009 Birthday Honours.

His father was the late Labour Party politician Lord Ennals.
