= Flying shuttle =

Weaving tool

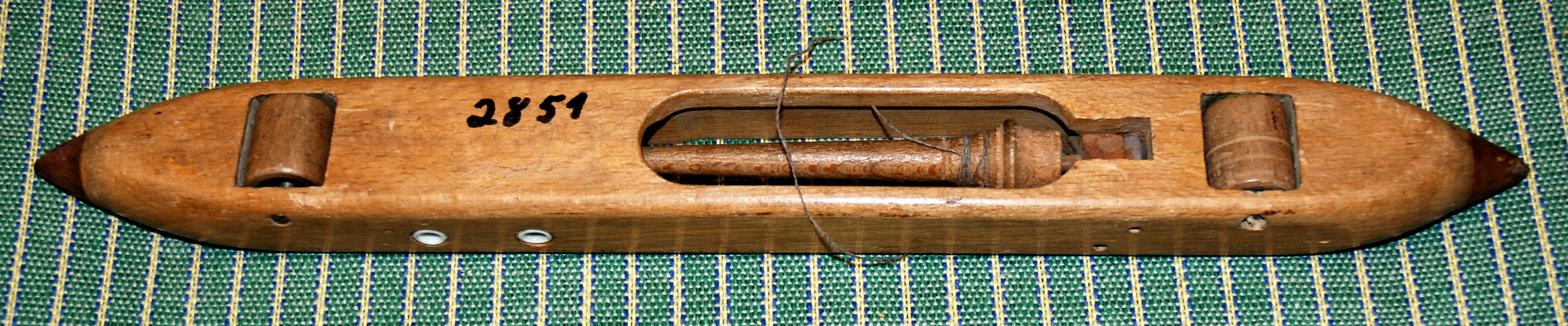
Flying shuttle from below, showing metal-capped ends, wheels, and a pirn of weft thread

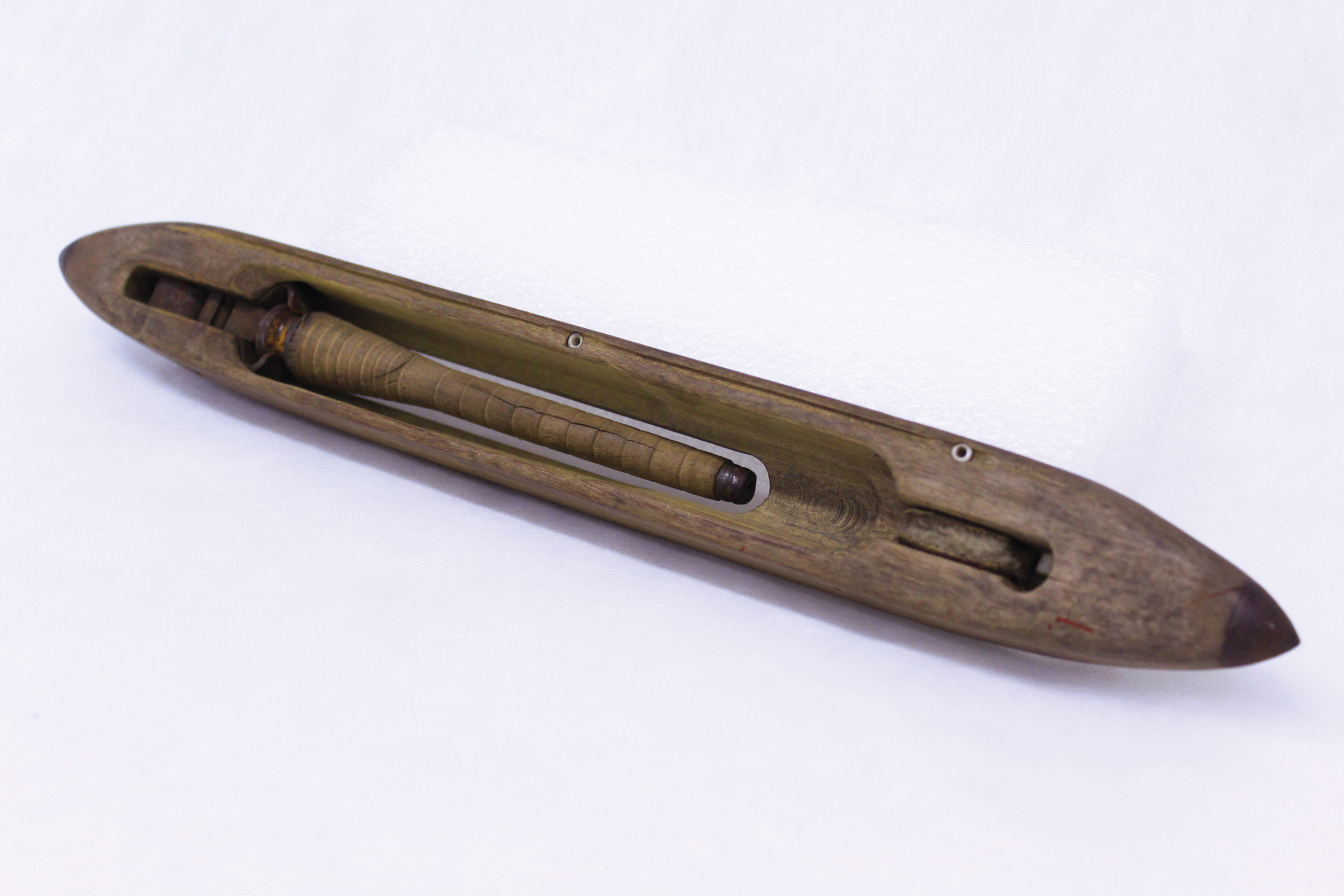
From above, showing conical pirn, and end-feed mechanism (the yarn slips off the end of the pirn, which need not rotate).

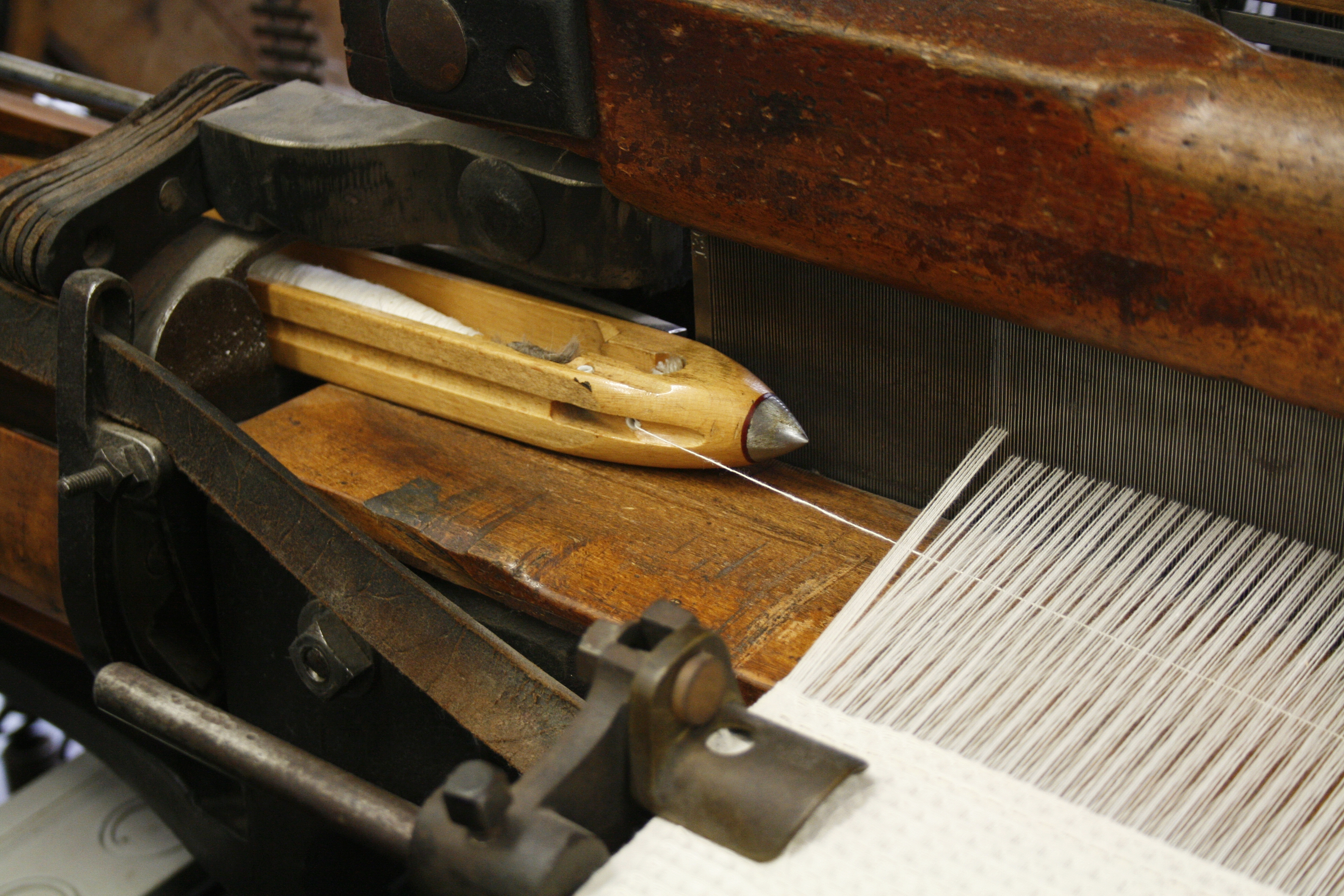
Flying shuttle in the shuttle race

The flying shuttle or fly shuttle is a type of weaving shuttle. It was a pivotal advancement in the mechanisation of weaving during the initial stages of the Industrial Revolution, and facilitated the weaving of considerably broader fabrics, enabling the production of wider textiles. Moreover, its mechanical implementation enabled the introduction of automatic machine looms.

The brainchild of John Kay, the flying shuttle received a patent in the year 1733 during the Industrial Revolution. Its implementation brought about an acceleration of the previously manual weaving process and resulted in a significant reduction in the required labour force. Formerly, a broad-cloth loom necessitated the presence of a weaver on each side, but with the advent of the flying shuttle, a solitary operator could handle the task proficiently.

Prior to this breakthrough, the textile industry relied upon the coordination of four spinners to support a single weaver. The widespread adoption of the flying shuttle by the 1750s dramatically exacerbated this labour imbalance, marking a notable shift in textile production dynamics.

== History ==
The exact origin of this device is difficult to accurately ascertain due to poor documentation at the time. Nonetheless, there are two general schools of thought around this: first those that believe that it appears to have been invented in the region of Languedoc of southern France (one year before its introduction in England), but was destroyed by state cloth inspectors of the rent-seeking ancien régime; second, those that believe it simply originated where it was industrialized, England.

=== John Kay ===
The flying shuttle is typically attributed to John Kay, who patented the device in 1733. It allowed a single weaver to operate a loom by propelling the shuttle through the warp threads using cords and pickers mounted on wheels. Prior to this, weaving wide cloth required two operators working in tandem.

=== Spread ===
Despite the patent, Kay was unable to control the spread of his invention. He (and, initially, his partners) would launch numerous patent infringement lawsuits, but such efforts bore little fruit and could not sustain the cost of litigation. Fly shuttle manufacturers formed "The Shuttle Club", a syndicate formed by patent pirates to fight Kay's legal challenges.

By the 1750s, the flying shuttle had spread widely across English weaving districts and was soon adopted on the continent as well. In France, Kay was invited to promote the device and provided demonstrations to French textile interests, although adoption there was slowed by guild resistance and institutional constraints.

In 1788, Scottish weavers Joseph Alexander and James McKevin were likely the first to introduce the flying shuttle to the United States.

=== Impact ===
The flying shuttle roughly doubled weaving productivity and enabled the production of much wider fabrics. However, it created an imbalance between spinning and weaving, since spinning output could no longer keep pace with weaving capacity. This imbalance spurred a wave of spinning innovations.

=== Later developments ===
Kay's son Robert Kay invented the drop box attachment in 1759 or 1760, which enabled looms to use multiple shuttles for weaving different colored threads, facilitating the production of patterned fabrics. Following the development of power looms, it was quickly suggested that the drop box ought to be applied to them, so as to enable more complex designs to be woven mechanically. Edmund Cartwright made an early attempt to integrate the drop box into a power loom in 1792; however, such a combination would not prove practical until well into the 19th century. The Jacquard loom was applied to the drop box in 1836. Later looms, such as the Northrop Loom, retained the shuttle principle but automated shuttle changing and weft replenishment, greatly increasing efficiency.

== Operation ==
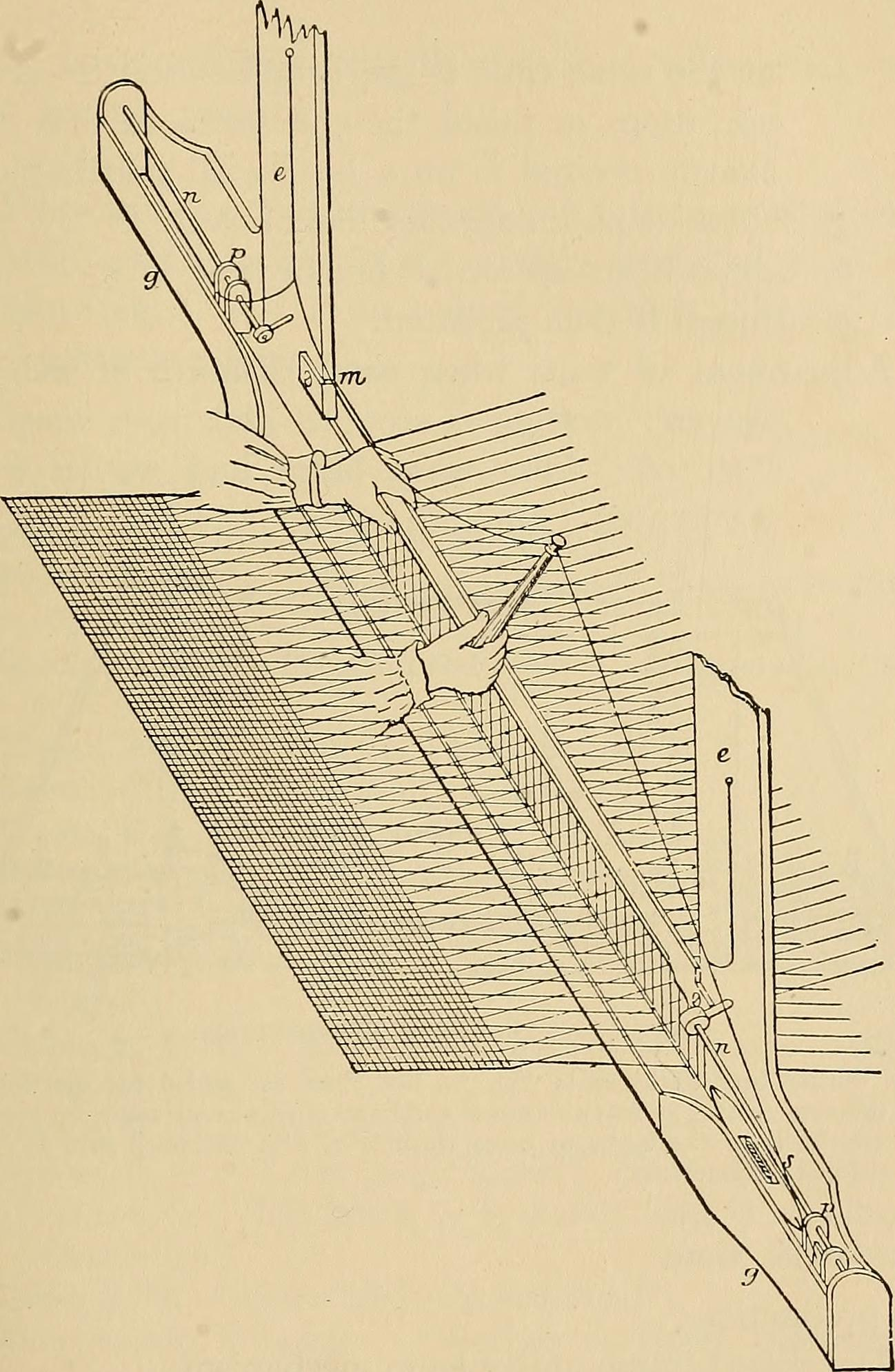
Holding the reed beater bar in the left hand, and the (picking-stick-mounted) string tugged to return the flying shuttle in the right hand. See video below.

In a typical frame loom, as used previous to the invention of the flying shuttle, the operator sat with the newly woven cloth before them, using treadles or some other mechanism to raise and lower the heddles, which opened the shed in the warp threads. They then had to reach forward while holding the shuttle in one hand and pass this through the shed; the shuttle carried a bobbin for the weft. The shuttle then had to be caught in the other hand, the shed closed, and the beater pulled in against the fell to push the weft into place. This action (called a "pick") required regularly bending forward over the fabric.

More importantly, the coordination between the throwing and catching of the shuttle required that the weaver was weaving narrow cloth (typically 60 inches (150 cm) or less). If the loom was for weaving broad cloth multiple weavers were needed: one on the left side at the shed, and one on the right side at the shed (and sometimes, one to operate the treadles). These two reached across the loom, passing the shuttle back and forth through the shed.

The flying shuttle employs a smooth board, called the "race", which runs, side to side, along the front of the beater, forming a track on which the shuttle runs. The lower threads of the shed rest on the track and the shuttle slides over them. At each end of the race, there is a box which catches the shuttle at the end of its journey, and which contains a mechanism for propelling the shuttle on its return trip (which may be yanked into action by the cord from the handheld picking-stick, or fully automated).

The shuttle itself has some subtle differences from the older form, especially for automated and powered looms. The ends of the shuttle are often bullet-shaped and metal-capped, and the shuttle generally has rollers to reduce friction. The weft thread is made to exit from the end rather than the side, and the thread is stored on a pirn (a long, conical, one-ended, non-turning bobbin) to allow it to feed more easily. Finally, the flying shuttle is generally somewhat heavier, so as to have sufficient momentum to carry it all the way through the shed.

Handloom with a flying shuttle. The shuttle runs in a shuttle race attached to the front of the (bottom-mounted) beater bar. Subtitles describe step-by-step.

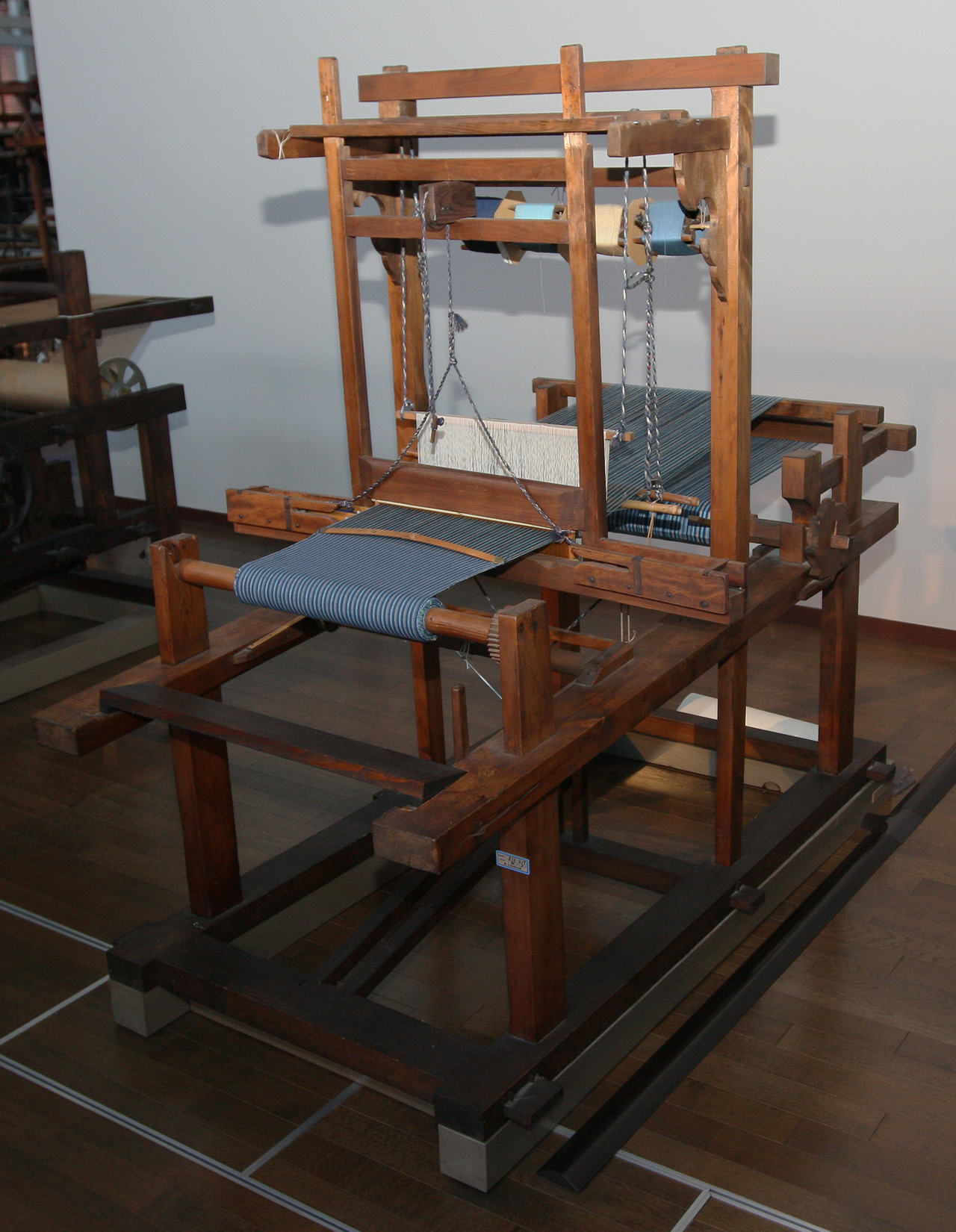
Narrow tanmono loom with an obvious shuttle race on a top-mounted beater bar. Late 1800s Japan.

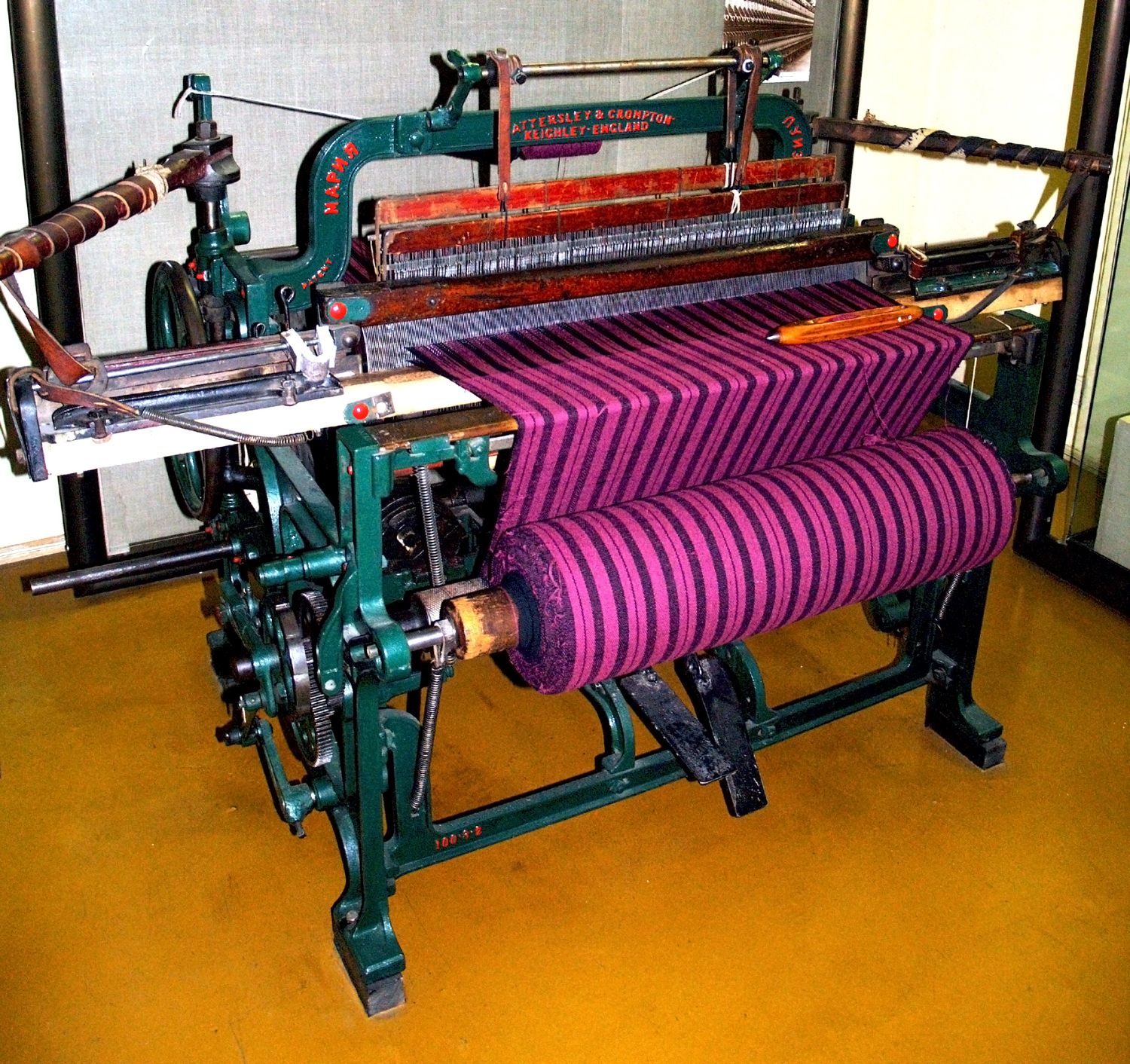
This 1893 Yorkshire-made handloom has a flying shuttle; it is not just controlled but powered by the pedals.

The fully automated shuttle moves almost too fast to see.

An early fully automated loom. The arms at the sides can be seen swinging to bash the flying shuttle back and forth.

== Social effects ==
The increase in production due to the flying shuttle exceeded the capacity of the spinning industry of the day and prompted the development of powered spinning machines. Beginning with the spinning jenny and the water frame until ultimately culminating in the spinning mule, which could produce strong, fine thread in the quantities needed these innovations transformed the textile industry in Great Britain. The innovation was seen as a threat to the livelihood of spinners and weavers, which resulted in an uprising that had Kay's patent largely ignored. It is often incorrectly written that Kay was attacked and fled to France, but in fact he simply moved there to attempt to rent out his looms, a business model that had failed him in England.

The flying shuttle produced a new source of injuries to the weaving process; if deflected from its path, it could be shot clear of the machine, potentially striking and injuring workers. Turn-of-the-century injury reports abound with instances in which eyes were lost or other injuries sustained and, in several instances (for example, an extended exchange in 1901), the British House of Commons was moved to take up the issue of installing guards and other contrivances to reduce these injuries.

== Obsolescence ==
The flying shuttle dominated commercial weaving through the middle of the twentieth century. However, by that time, other systems had begun to replace it. The heavy shuttle was noisy and energy-inefficient (since the energy used to throw it was largely lost in the catching); also, its inertia limited the speed of the loom. Projectile and rapier looms eliminated the need to take the bobbin/pirn of thread through the shed; later, air-jet and water-jet looms reduced the weight of moving parts further. Flying shuttle looms are still used for some purposes, and old models remain in use.
