= Claire Tyler, Baroness Tyler of Enfield =

The Right Honourable The Baroness Tyler of Enfield FAcSS
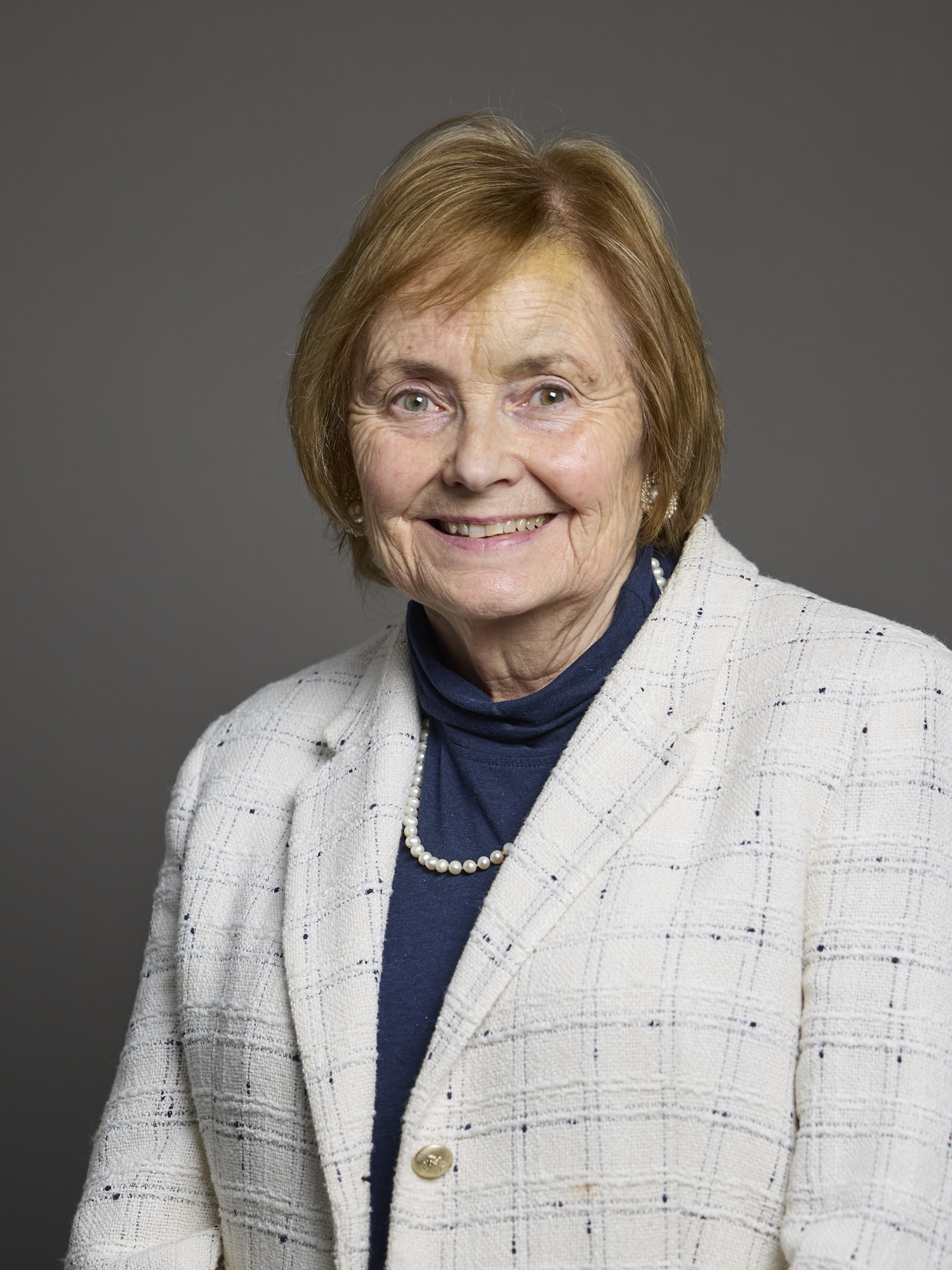
- Official portrait, 2025

Member of the House of Lords
- Lord Temporal
- Life peerage 28 January 2011

Personal details
- Born: 4 June 1957 (age 69)
- Party: Liberal Democrats

Claire Tyler, Baroness Tyler of Enfield, FAcSS (born 4 June 1957) is a Liberal Democrat life peer in the House of Lords.

== Education and early career ==
After graduating with a BSc in Law and Politics from the University of Southampton, Claire Tyler joined the Greater London Council/Inner London Education Authority in 1978 and the Civil Service in 1988. She has a Diploma in Management Studies and is a Fellow of the Chartered Institute of Personnel and Development.

== Career in Parliament ==
Claire Tyler was nominated as a Liberal Democrat Peer in November 2010 and since 1 February 2011 has sat in the House of Lords, having been created a life peer on 28 January 2011 taking the title Baroness Tyler of Enfield, of Enfield in the London Borough of Enfield. She takes an active role in issues pertaining to health and social care, mental health, social mobility, poverty and disadvantage, well-being, children and family policy, and the voluntary sector.

In the Lords, Claire Tyler is the Liberal Democrat Spokesperson for Mental Health. She was a member of the Lords Select Committee on Intergenerational Fairness which reported in April 2019. Previously, Claire chaired the Lords Select Committee on Financial Exclusion, which reported in 2017. She has also been a member of the Lord's Select Committee on Affordable Childcare which reported in March 2015, the Lords Select Committee on Social Mobility, which reported in April 2016, and the Lords Select Committee on Public Services and Demography which produced the report "Ready for Ageing".

Claire Tyler is currently Co-chair of the All Party Parliamentary Group on Wellbeing Economics and the All Party Parliamentary Group on Social Mobility. She is also Vice Chair of the All Party Parliamentary Group for Parents and Families, the All Party Parliamentary Group on Carers, the All Party Parliamentary Group on Strengthening Relationships and the All Party Parliamentary Group on Mental Health.

As Co-Chair of the APPG on Social Mobility, she was lead author of the "Character and Resilience Manifesto", published in 2014 which was written in collaboration with the think tanks CentreForum and Character Counts. Claire also chaired the Parliamentary Inquiry into Parenting and Social Mobility which reported in March 2015.

Claire Tyler was also Co-chair of the Parliamentary Inquiry into Charitable Giving which reported in June 2014. In 2013, she chaired the 2013 Liberal Democrat policy working group which produced the report "A Balanced Working Life" and was a member of the Liberal Democrat Working Group on an Ageing Population which reported in 2014. Claire Tyler is also a Vice-President of Liberal International Great Britain.

== Career outside of Parliament ==
Claire Tyler (Baroness Tyler of Enfield) is currently the President of the NCB (National Children's Bureau), a position she has held since August 2012. She became the Vice-President of Relate in November 2012. Claire chairs the "Make Every Adult Matter" coalition of charities helping adults with multiple needs, serves on the board of Social Work England and a member of the Advisory Council of Step Up to Serve, which co-ordinates the #iwill campaign.

Claire Tyler was the Chair of CAFCASS (Children and Family Court Advisory and Support Service) between 2012 and 2018. She was Vice Chair of the Think Ahead Sub Committee overseeing a new adult mental health social work fast track programme between 2014 and 2017.

Claire Tyler chaired the Values-Based Child and Adolescent Mental Health System Commission, which reported in September 2016.

Between 2007 and 2012, Claire Tyler was the chief executive officer of Relate, the UK's leading relationship support agency between 2007 and 2012. This followed a number of senior positions within Government, the last of which was Director of the Vulnerable Children's Group at the Department for Children, Schools and Families (now the Department for Education). She also chaired the 'Kids in the Middle' coalition, a group of national charities and agony aunts campaigning for better services for separating parents and their children.

Before then, she had been the Director of the Government's Social Exclusion Unit and a board member of the former Office of the Deputy Prime Minister from April 2002 until June 2006. From July 2000 to April 2002 Claire was the Deputy Chief executive of the Connexions Service.

As a panellist on the BBC Radio 4 programme Any Questions?, on 8 April 2011, she revealed that after graduating from University, she was interviewed in a discreet London location, an interview that she believed was carried out by the Security Services. She was not recruited.

== Honours ==
In 2016, she was elected a Fellow of the Academy of Social Sciences (FAcSS).
