= Allan Levy =

Allan E Levy
- Born: 17 August 1942; Bury Infirmary, Bury, Lancashire, England
- Died: 26 September 2004 (aged 62); Edenhall nursing home, Camden, London
- Education: Bury Grammar School; University of Hull; Inns of Court School of Law
- Occupation: Queen's Counsel
- Years active: 1969–2004
- Known for: Children's rights advocacy
- Notable work: Pindown Enquiry

Allan Edward Levy was a barrister specialising in family law and an advocate of children's rights. He is best known for his chairmanship of the Pindown Enquiry and, as a result of the public exposure the enquiry brought, he was much in demand as a speaker at family law conferences within the United Kingdom and internationally.

== Early years ==
Levy was born on 17 August 1942 at the infirmary in Bury, Lancashire. He was the only child of Sidney Levy, a radio engineer, and his wife Mabel (née Lewis). The family lived in Prestwich, now part of Greater Manchester, but at that time in Lancashire; Levy remained a proud Lancastrian throughout his life.

== Education ==
At the age of 11, Levy won a place at Bury Grammar School and, by the time he was in the upper sixth, had been appointed a prefect and captain of the 3rd XI soccer team. After sitting 'A' levels in English, history and geography, he went up to the University of Hull to read law. Although he was far from diligent in his studies, he graduated LLB (Honours) and, after attending the Inns of Court School of Law, he was called to the bar by the Inner Temple in 1969.

== Legal career ==
Practising in family law, Levy was often more successful in the House of Lords and the European Court of Human Rights than in lower courts or in the Court of Appeal. In 1987, he represented the interests of a 17-year-old girl with Down's Syndrome and a mental age of six who was due to be sterilised. Acting for the official solicitor, representing the girl's interests, Levy took the case as far as the House of Lords, which allowed the operation to go ahead, though not without considerable controversy. In one emergency case, in which an Oxford student tried (ultimately unsuccessfully) to stop his girlfriend having an abortion, Levy was briefed in the lift on the way up to the court. He appeared in important cases on surrogacy and child abduction, and was at the Court of Appeal for the Saturday sitting in 1988 at which a local authority first tried to make a foetus a ward of court.

Levy was a passionate advocate for the rights of children and a strong opponent of corporal punishment in any form. In 1995, he represented five children, abused by their parents, who claimed compensation from the local authority which had done nothing to protect them. He also took up the case in 1998 of a boy whose stepfather had beaten him but had escaped prosecution on the grounds of "necessary and reasonable chastisement". In both cases Levy was successful on appeal to the European Court of Human Rights. In The Observer in July 2003, he called for a total ban on smacking or hitting children, writing: "Adults cannot pick and choose among the human rights they bestow on children. The right to respect for one's human dignity and physical integrity is fundamental for all of us." He later fought to have a ban on parental corporal punishment included in the Children Act 2004.

Levy was an early member of the Family Law Association, sitting on its committee 1987–1997, and was a committee member of the Bar Council for two years. From 1988, he sat on the council of JUSTICE and was a member of the Council of the Medico-Legal Society from 1990.

He took silk in 1989, was elected a bencher of the Inner Temple in 1993 and sat as a recorder from 1993 to 2001. His advocacy for children led to his being invited to become a member of the Gulbenkian Foundation's Commission on Children and Violence from 1994 to 1995, and of the Howard League's Commission of Inquiry into Violence in Penal Institutions for Young People, also from 1994 to 1995. From 1990 until his death, he was honorary legal adviser to the National Children's Bureau and he was a patron of the Children's Legal Centre from 1999. He chaired the British Medical Association's steering group that published its practical guidance, Consent, Rights and Choices in Healthcare for Children and Young People in 2000.

In later years, he became increasingly involved in cases of medico-legal ethics, especially the adult's right to refuse treatment. In 1992, for example, Levy acted for the father of an accident victim who was heavily sedated and on a ventilator. She was a Jehovah's Witness and had refused blood transfusions. He won the order for her to be given the transfusions and the decision was later upheld in the Court of Appeal. In the same year, he acted for a mother who wished to stop doctors taking her brain-damaged baby off a ventilator, although he lost the case.

In 1993, again unsuccessfully, he represented the first adult to apply for his own adoption order to be revoked. Jonathan Bradley had been adopted by Orthodox Jews and brought up as Ian Rosenthal. He discovered later that his real father was both an Arab Muslim and a former member of the Kuwaiti government. It was a case that Levy, a non-practising Jew, found particularly fascinating. He was also supportive of Young Minds, a charity supporting mentally ill children and young people, and was an early advocate for a children's commissioner when it lacked political support.

At the time of his final illness, Levy was poised to represent a group of parents suing paediatricians and a local authority for errant accusations of abuse and subsequently taking their children into care. He was hoping to overturn in the House of Lords rulings by lower courts so that the children (rather than their parents) could prosecute the case.

Levy was appointed Senior Visiting Fellow in the Law Faculty at the University of Southampton in 2002 and a Fellow of the Institute of Advanced Legal Studies in 1998. He was the Sidgwick Memorial Lecturer at Newnham College in 2001.

== Pindown ==
In 1990, Staffordshire County Council determined to hold an inquiry into abuses in a number of the county's children's homes. Children had been subject to a Pindown regime of isolation and other punishments; it was a system of behavior management intended to pin down the problem of disruptive children (rather than physically to pin down children – although it frequently included instances of both.) As a noted children's advocate, Levy was invited to chair the inquiry; he asked that he be joined as co-chairman by Barbara Kahan, chair of the National Children's Bureau.

In 75 days, the inquiry heard evidence from 153 witnesses. In 1991, it produced its finding as The Pindown Experience and the Protection of Children: the Report of the Staffordshire Childcare Inquiry. The report offered detailed, key recommendations, stating that Pindown was unethical, unprofessional and unacceptable' and, furthermore, was 'a fundamental abuse of human rights. The inquiry, the first into residential care, led to the Quality Protects initiative, launched by the Department of Health in 1998, which sought to improve a range of childcare services.

His friendship with Kahan (whom he had not known before the inquiry) continued until her death, whilst Levy went on to chair the Vladimir and Barbara Kahan Trust.

== Overseas links ==
Levy's prominence in his field brought him an international reputation and international appointments, including his chairmanship of the Inter-country Adoption Lawyers' Association from 1991 to 1995, and of the International Bar Association's meeting at the Hague Conference on Private International Law in 1992, which focused on inter-country adoption. Also in 1992, he became a fellow of the International Academy of Matrimonial Lawyers and in 2001, he served as visiting professor at Washburn University School of Law in Kansas. He was a guest speaker at the Seventh International Congress on Child Abuse in Rio de Janeiro (1988) and keynote speaker at the Australian Child Abuse Conference in Melbourne (1995).

== Personal life ==
Levy was reportedly "sociable, friendly and generous, with a delightful sense of humour". He insisted on finding time to help younger members of chambers, and had "a large circle of friends among bench and bar". He was a member of the Reform Club, and a fan of Manchester City Football and Lancashire County Cricket clubs. He was especially pleased if his international commitments coincided with international cricket events in the West Indies or Australia. He enjoyed foreign travel, and collected paintings by Lowry and books; he was heard to say that he could never move from his flat in Belsize Park because his collection of books was too large and was reputed to be widely read in "the most unlikely fields – from philosophy to detective fiction, and all points in between."

Although he enjoyed female company, Levy joked that his remaining single helped to keep the divorce statistics down. He had no children and died in a nursing home on 26 September 2004.

== Published work ==
In addition to newspaper and journal articles, he was the author of works including;

- Wardship Proceedings London: Oyez Longman, 1982
- Adoption of Children London: Oyez Longman, 1985 (with J F Josling)
- Re-Focus on Child Abuse London: Thorogood 1989 (as editor and contributor)
- One Scandal Too Many Lisbon: Calouste Gulbenkian Foundation 1993 (contributor)
- Medico-Legal Essentials in Health Care Cambridge: Cambridge University Press 1996 (contributor)

== See also ==
- Child advocacy
- Medical ethics
- Timeline of young people's rights in the United Kingdom
