= Robert Kay (inventor) =

English inventor (1728–1802)

Robert Kay (1728–1802) was an English inventor, best known for designing a drop box to improve the capability of weaving looms.

Robert Kay was born in 1728 to John Kay and Ann Holt. He became a shuttlemaker in his native Bury, Lancashire, married in 1748 and had several children. His father emigrated to France in 1747 and was joined there by Robert and two other sons, James and John. (Note: It seems probable from baptismal records for his children that Robert did not journey to France until around 1751.) The flying shuttle, also known as the wheel-shuttle, had been invented by John senior around 1733 but his commercial acumen did not match his engineering ingenuity and financial problems may have contributed to the move abroad. Robert had returned to Bury probably in 1759 and in either that year or 1760, he designed a method for deploying multiple shuttles simultaneously, enabling the use of wefts of more than one colour and so making it easier for the weaver to produce cross-striped material. These shuttles were housed at the side of the loom in what became known as the drop box. He did not patent the invention but went on to produce other improvements to the shuttle that assisted in producing checked material and ticking for beds, as well as a mechanism for manufacturing the cards used in carding machines.

The drop box probably caused an increase in the use of the flying shuttle: combining the two made the weaving mechanism more complex, but it greatly increased the production speed of even fairly complex cloths.

== See also ==
- Drop box (weaving device)
