= W. Geoffrey Arnott =

William Geoffrey Arnott FBA (17 September 1930 – 1 December 2010) was a British Hellenist who was Professor of Greek Language and Literature at the University of Leeds. He studied comic and other forms of poetry, as well as birds in the ancient world.

== Early life and education ==
Arnott was born in Bury, Lancashire, and attended Bury Grammar School from 1940 to 1947. He studied classics at Pembroke College, Cambridge, graduating in 1952 with a first class BA (converted as usual to an Oxbridge MA). While an undergraduate at Pembroke he won the Porson Prize for Greek verse. In 1960, he received a PhD from the University of Cambridge, with a dissertation on the comic poet Alexis.

== Academic career ==
Arnott was a lecturer at King's College, Cambridge from 1960 to 1963. In 1963 he was appointed a senior lecturer at the University of Newcastle upon Tyne and in 1968 he took up the chair of Greek Language and Literature at the University of Leeds.

Whilst at Leeds, Arnott was visiting professor at the Universities of British Columbia, Alexandria, Queensland, and Bologna. In 1973, he was a scholar at the Institute for Advanced Study in Princeton. In the academic year 1987–88 he was a visiting fellow at Gonville and Caius College, Cambridge.

Arnott retired from his chair in 1991 and became professor emeritus.

Arnott was one of world's leading experts on Greek comic poetry, the work of the likes of Alexis and Menander. The exhaustive edition of the fragments of Alexis goes back to Arnott's dissertation. From 1979 to 2000 he edited the now authoritative complete edition, plus notes and translation, of the comedies of Menander, whose works were extensive, but also difficult to decipher and classify until 20th century papyrus discoveries. Other fields of his work included Euripides, the Hellenistic poets, the Greek predecessors of the novel, Aristaenetus, Athenaeus, and ancient ornithology.

== Honours ==
In 1981 he became a member of the Società Italiana per lo Studio dell'Antichità Classica and in 1999 was made a fellow of the British Academy (FBA).

== Personal life ==
A lifelong hobby was birdwatching. Arnott was a member of his local branch of the Royal Society for the Protection of Birds and from 1981 to 1984 he was President of the Leeds Birdwatchers Club. Out of this hobby grew an interest in birds in ancient culture, which fed some of his research interests.

Arnott died on 1 December 2010 at the age of 80. He was survived by his wife Vera and by their daughters Alison, Hilary and Rosemary.

== Bibliography ==
This is a partial bibliography of his work:

- Menander's Dyskolos or The man who didn't like people (English translation; Athlone Press, 1960)
- Menander, Plautus, Terence (New Surveys in the Classics, No. 9. Clarendon Press, 1975)
- Menander (Loeb Classical Library, in 3 volumes, 1979, 1997, 2000)
- Alexis: The fragments: A commentary (Cambridge Classical Texts and Commentary, 1996)
- Birds in the ancient world from A to Z (Routledge, 2007)
