= Cecil Cronshaw =

British industrial chemist (1889-1961)

Dr Cecil John Turrell Cronshaw FRSE DSc (1889 – 1961) was a British industrial chemist, Manager of the Manchester Ship Canal and Director of the chemical giant, ICI. He was involved in the evolution of modern industrial dyes.

== Life ==
He was born in Bury, a town north of Manchester, on 13 June 1889, the son of William Robert Cronshaw, a commercial traveller, and his wife, Ann Elizabeth Turrell. He was educated at Bury Grammar School.

He was apprenticed in the business world in Manchester Chamber of Commerce and obtained a BSc at Manchester University. From 1915 he worked in the large Manchester firm of Levinstein & Co, under Herbert Levinstein. In 1919 this firm merged with British Dyes to create the British Dyestuffs Corporation. In relation to pre-war conditions production was tenfold: 25,000 tons as opposed to 2000 tons, but the range of colours dropped from 2000 colours to only 500.

From 1924, Cronshaw was the Technical Manager of British Dyestuffs Corporation, remaining in the company during its transition into the global giant ICI. This placed him in a critical position upon the creation of ICI in 1926, and he thereafter always held senior roles, including Chairman from 1939 and Director from 1943 until retiral in December 1953.

In 1926, he lodged a patent for the manufacture of diarylguanidines, a modern dye-type. In 1928 the company took over Scottish Dyes of Grangemouth run by James Morton.

He was elected a Fellow of the Royal Society of Edinburgh in 1936 for his contributions to the dye industry. His proposers included fellow dye-pioneer Sir James Morton, Thomas Henry Holland, David Bain, and Robert Kerr Hannay. In 1938, the University of Leeds awarded him an honorary doctorate (DSc).

He died in Manchester on 5 January 1961.

== Family ==
In 1917, he married Annie Downham, and had two children - Geoffrey Cronshaw, and Oliver Cecil Cronshaw.

== Artistic recognition ==
A bust of Cronshaw was sculpted by Fiore de Henriquez in 1953, during his final year in ICI.
