= Warp and weft =

Two constituent threads of woven cloth

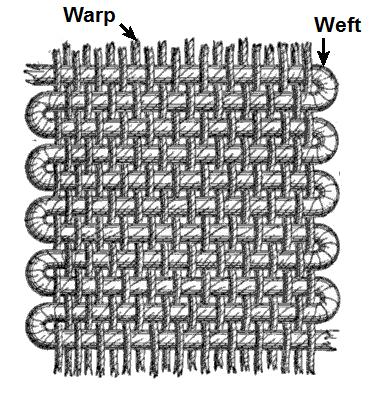
Warp and weft in plain weaving. See weaving for other weave pattens, such as twill.

In the manufacture of cloth, warp and weft are the two basic components in weaving to transform thread and yarn into textile fabrics. The vertical warp yarns are held stationary in tension on a loom (frame) while the horizontal weft (also called the woof) is drawn through (inserted over and under) the warp thread. In the terminology of weaving, each warp thread is called a warp end; a pick is a single weft thread that crosses the warp thread (synonymous terms are fill yarn and filling yarn).

In the 18th century, the Industrial Revolution facilitated the industrialisation of the production of textile fabrics with the picking stick and the flying shuttle, the latter of which was invented by John Kay, in 1733. The mechanised power loom was patented by Edmund Cartwright in 1785, which allowed sixty picks per minute.

== Etymology ==
The word weft derives from the Old English word wefan, to weave. Warp means "that across which the woof is thrown". (Old English wearp, from weorpan, to throw, cf. German werfen, Dutch werpen).

== Warp ==
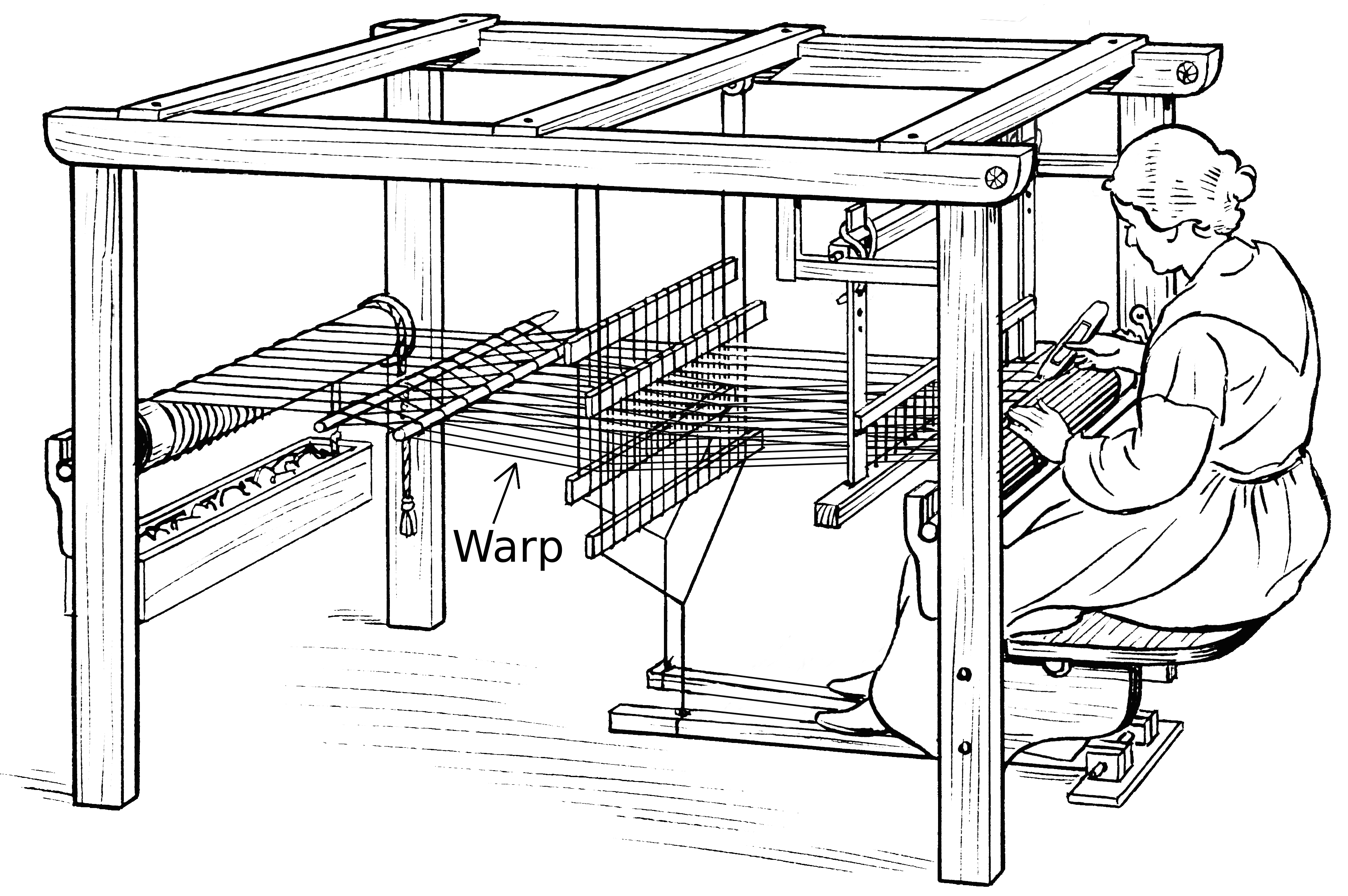
Warped loom. Warp is wrapped onto the warp beam; as the cloth is made, the fell (woven part) is wrapped onto the breast beam next to the weaver.

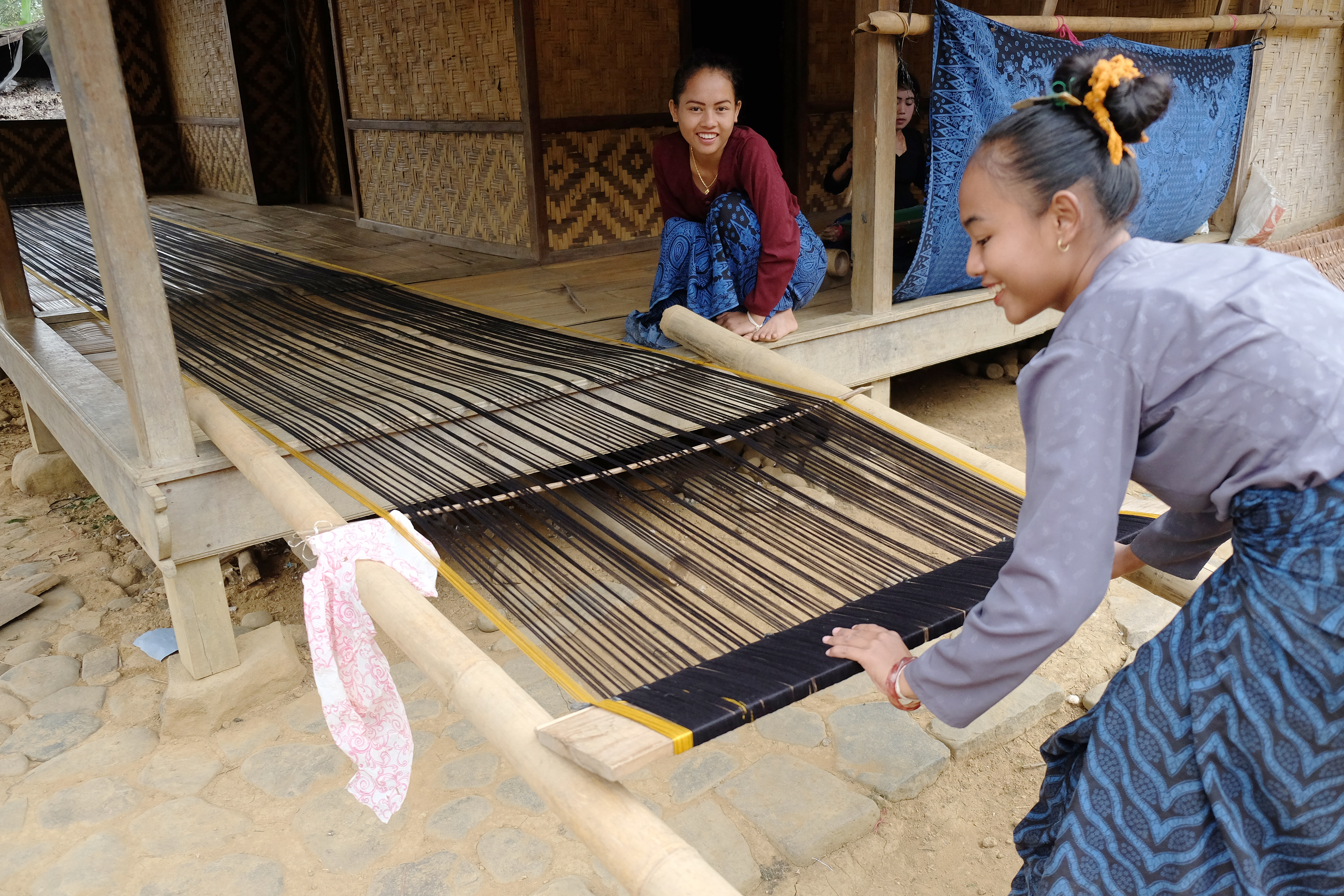
Wrapping of the warp threads around the warp beam of a loom in preparation for weaving

Warp threads in tablet weaving

The warp is the set of yarns or other things stretched in place on a loom before the weft is introduced during the weaving process, and the longitudinal set in a finished fabric with two or more sets of elements.

The term is also used for a set of yarns established before the interworking of weft yarns by some other method, such as finger manipulation, yielding wrapped or twined structures. Very simple looms use a spiral warp, in which the warp is made up of a single, very long yarn wound in a spiral pattern around a pair of sticks or beams.

The warp must be strong to be held under high tension during the weaving process, unlike the weft which carries almost no tension. This requires the yarn used for warp ends, or individual warp threads, to be made of spun and plied fibre. Traditionally natural fibres such as wool, linen, alpaca, and silk were used. However, improvements in spinning technology during the Industrial Revolution created cotton yarn of sufficient strength to be used in mechanized weaving. Later, synthetic fibres such as nylon or rayon were employed.

While most weaving is weft-faced, warp-faced textiles are created using densely arranged warp threads. In these, the design is in the warp, requiring all colors to be decided upon and placed during the first part of the weaving process, which cannot be changed. Such limitations of color placement create weavings defined by length-wise stripes and vertical designs. Many South American cultures, including the ancient Incas and Aymaras, employed backstrap weaving, which uses the weight of the weaver's body to control the tension of the loom.

== Weft ==
Because the weft does not have to be stretched on a loom like the warp, it can generally be less strong. Originally used were spun yarns from fibres such as wool, flax and cotton. As of this date, viscose-type (e.g., rayon) fibres, and synthetic fibres such as polyester and polyamide (nylon) are used.

Handlooms were the original weaver's tool, with the shuttle being threaded through alternately raised warps by hand. In modern applications, the weft is threaded through the warp using a shuttle, air jets, or rapier grippers.

== Appearances in literature ==
=== Literally ===
The terms warp and woof are also found in some English translations of the Bible, in the discussion of mildews found in cloth materials (e.g., in Leviticus 13:48–59).

=== As metaphor ===
The expression warp and weft (also warp and woof) is used metaphorically the way the word fabric might be; for instance, "the warp and woof of a student's life" equates to "the fabric of a student's life". The expression is also used similarly for the underlying structure upon which something is built.

The expression "warp and weft" is sometimes used even more generally in literature to describe perceived basic dichotomies of the world in which one lives, e.g., the dichotomies of up and down, in and out, black and white, sun and moon, yin and yang, etc.

== In other fields ==
In computing, a warp is a block of parallel threads executed on a GPU or similar SIMD device.

== See also ==
- Warp knitting
