= Drop box (weaving device) =

Housing for a weaving shuttle

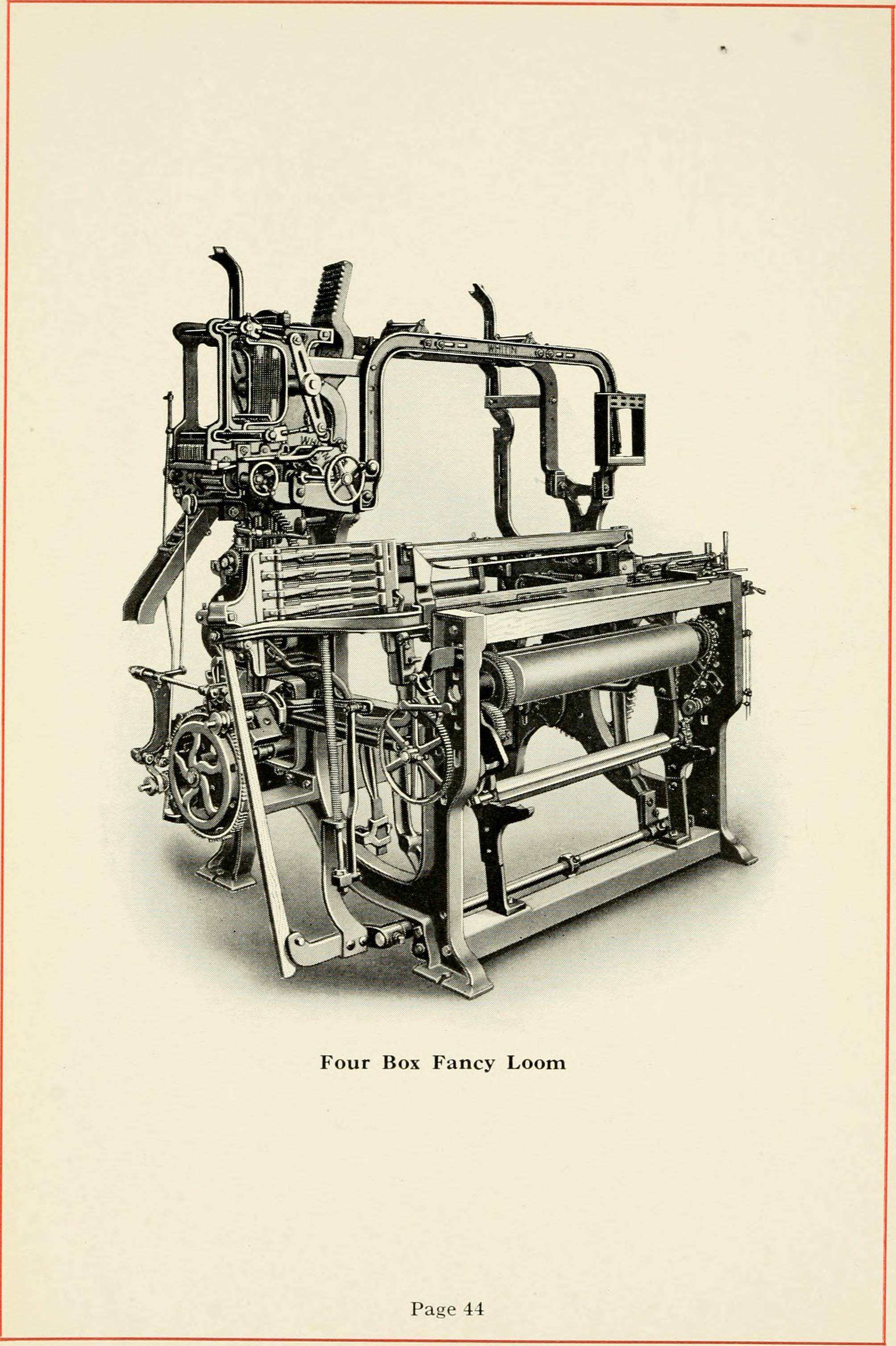
Drawing of a Whitin loom featuring four drop boxes

In weaving, a drop box or dropbox is a housing for a shuttle, invented in 1759 or 1760 by Robert Kay (1727-1802) in Bury, Lancashire. The box sits beside a loom and allows one to rapidly switch between two shuttles with bobbins, usually of different colors, making it easier and quicker to weave multiple colors for figured fabrics or striped wefts without stopping to manually change shuttles.

The drop box consists of a partitioned lift mechanism at one end of the loom, of which any section can be lowered to the working height of the loom so that the shuttle can be loaded.

Whilst the drop box made weaving equipment significantly more complex and expensive, it made the process much faster and contributed to a greater uptake of the flying shuttle which was invented by Robert Kay's father John Kay. The drop box was never patented.
