= Richard Wroe =

Richard Wroe

Richard Wroe (1641–1717), was warden of Manchester church, and so eloquent that he was called "silver tongued Wroe".

== Life ==
He was educated at the Bury Grammar School and at Jesus College, Cambridge, which he entered in June 1658. He graduated B.A. in 1661, M.A. in 1665, B.D. in 1672, and D.D. in 1686; and was incorporated M.A. of Oxford University in May 1669. Through the influence of Lord Delamere (afterwards Earl of Warrington) he obtained in 1672 a royal mandate for the next presentation to a fellowship of the college at Manchester. He was admitted in February 1674–5. His next promotion was to a prebendal stall in Chester Cathedral in March 1677–8. He had previously been appointed domestic chaplain to Dr. John Pearson (1613–1686), his diocesan, who in 1679 appointed him curate of Wigan church, and in April 1681 presented him to the rectory of Bowdon, Cheshire. This he resigned in March 1689–90. On 1 May 1684 he was installed warden of Manchester College, and in the same year became vicar of Garstang, Lancashire, which benefice he resigned in 1696 on being presented to the rectory of West Kirby, Cheshire.

During the long period of his wardenship Wroe had great influence in the Manchester area. A Whig, he was sincerely devoted to the Hanoverian dynasty. William Hulme appointed him one of the first trustees of the Hulmeian benefactions.

Wroe died at Manchester on 1 January 1718, and was buried in the chancel of the collegiate church.

== Works ==
As rural dean of Manchester Wroe rendered assistance to Bishop Gastrell in the compilation of his Notitia Cestriensis. He was a student of natural philosophy and a correspondent of Flamsteed. A number of his letters on public and personal affairs addressed to Roger and George Kenyon, 1694–1713, are preserved in the Kenyon manuscripts. He was the author of five separately published sermons; the animation and felicity of his pulpit discourses earned him the title of "silver-tongued Wroe".

== Personal ==
Wroe was the son of Richard Wroe of Heaton Yate or Heaton Gate in the parish of Prestwich, Lancashire, was born at Radcliffe, Lancashire, on 21 August 1641, and baptised on 8 September.

He married three times: first, to Elizabeth (surname unknown), who died in 1689; second, on 22 June 1693, to Ann Radcliffe, who died in the following January; third, on 2 March 1697, to Dorothy, daughter of Roger Kenyon of Peel, M.P. By his last wife he had four children, three of whom predeceased him; the youngest, Thomas, became a fellow of Manchester College.

His portrait was in the possession of Lord Kenyon. Copies of an etched portrait by Walter Geikie were published at Manchester about 1824, and a woodcut appears in the Palatine Notebook, 1882.
