= John Kay (flying shuttle) =

British inventor

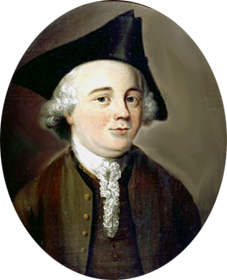
- Portrait, said to be of John Kay in the 1750s, but probably of his son, "Frenchman" John Kay.
- Born: 17 June (N.S 28 June) 1704; Walmersley, Bury, Lancashire, England
- Died: c. 1779; France
- Occupation: Inventor
- Known for: Flying shuttle
- Spouse: Anne Holte
- Children: Lettice, Robert (drop box inventor), Ann, Samuel, Lucy, James, John, Alice, Shuse, William, (and two other children who died in childhood)
- Parent(s): Robert Kay and Ellin Kay, née Entwisle

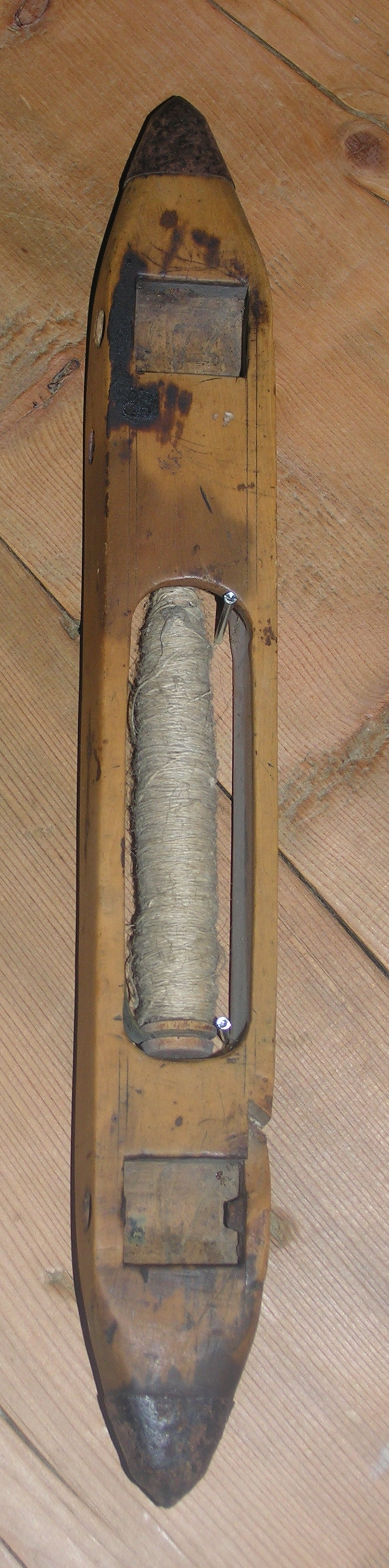
Flying shuttle showing metal capped ends, wheels, and a pirn of weft thread

John Kay (17 June 1704 – c. 1779) was an English inventor whose most important creation was the flying shuttle, which was a key contribution to the Industrial Revolution. He is often confused with his namesake, who built the first "spinning frame".

== Early life ==
John Kay was born on 17 June 1704 in the Lancashire hamlet of Walmersley, just north of Bury. His yeoman farmer father, Robert, owned the "Park" estate in Walmersley, and John was born there. Robert died before John was born, leaving Park House to his eldest son. As Robert's fifth son (out of ten children), John was bequeathed £40 (at age 21) and an education until the age of 14. His mother was responsible for educating him until she remarried.

=== Apprenticeship ===
Kay apprenticed with a hand-loom reed maker, but is said to have returned home within a month claiming to have mastered the business. He designed a metal substitute for the natural reed that proved popular enough for him to sell throughout England. After travelling the country, making and fitting wire reeds, he returned to Bury and, on 29 June 1725, both he and his brother, William, married Bury women. John's wife was Anne Holte. His daughter Lettice was born in 1726, and his son Robert in 1728.

In Bury he continued to design improvements to textile machinery. In 1730 he patented a cording and twisting machine for worsted.

== Flying shuttle ==
In 1733, Kay received a patent for his most revolutionary device: a "wheeled shuttle" for the hand loom. It greatly accelerated the weaving process by allowing the shuttle carrying the weft to be passed through the warp threads faster and over a greater width of cloth. It was designed for the broad loom, for which it saved labour over the traditional process, needing only one operator per loom (before Kay's improvements, a second worker was needed to catch the shuttle).

Kay always called this invention a "wheeled shuttle", but others used the name "fly-shuttle" (and later "flying shuttle") because of its continuous speed, especially when a young worker was using it in a narrow loom. The shuttle was described as travelling at "a speed which cannot be imagined, so great that the shuttle can only be seen like a tiny cloud which disappears the same instant."

=== Opposition ===
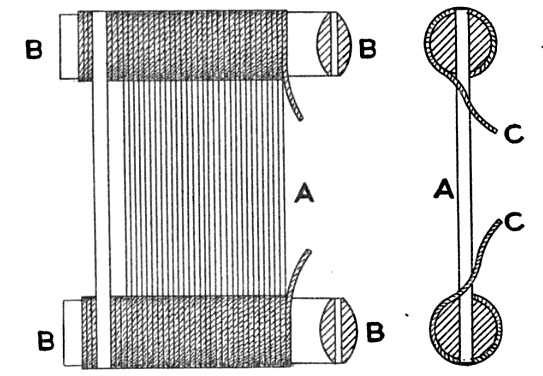
Reed structure: A: wires or dents B: wooden ribs C: tarred cord

In July 1733, Kay formed a partnership in Colchester, Essex to begin fly-shuttle manufacturing. No industrial unrest was anticipated, this being the first device of the modern era to significantly enhance productivity. But by September 1733 the Colchester weavers were so concerned for their livelihoods that they petitioned the King to stop Kay's inventions.

The flying shuttle was to create a particular imbalance by doubling weaving productivity without changing the rate at which thread could be spun, disrupting spinners and weavers alike.

Kay tried to promote the fly-shuttle in Bury, but could not convince the woollen manufacturers that it was sufficiently robust; he spent the next two years improving the technology until it had several advantages over the device specified in the 1733 patent. This was to be one of his difficulties in the coming patent disputes.

In 1738 Kay went to Leeds, where his problem had become royalty collection (the annual licence fee was 15 shillings per shuttle). He continued to invent, patenting some machines in the same year, though these were not taken up industrially.

=== The Shuttle Club ===
Kay (and, initially, his partners) launched numerous patent infringement lawsuits, but if any of these cases were successful, compensation was below the cost of prosecution. Rather than capitulate, the manufacturers formed "The Shuttle Club", a syndicate which paid the costs of any member brought to court; their strategy of patent piracy and mutual indemnification nearly bankrupted Kay.

In 1745, he and Joseph Stell patented a machine for cloth ribbon weaving, which they anticipated might be worked by water wheel, but they were unable to advance their plans because of Kay's legal costs. Impoverished and harassed, Kay was compelled to leave Leeds, and he returned to Bury. Also in 1745, Kay's twelfth and final child, William, was born.

Kay remained inventive. In 1746 he was working on an efficient method of salt production and designing improvements to spinning technology, but the latter made him unpopular among Bury spinners. Also, fly-shuttle use was becoming widespread in weaving, increasing cotton yarn demand and its price; and Kay was blamed.

== Life in France ==
Kay had suffered violent treatment in England, though left the country not on that account but instead because of his inability to enforce (or profit from) his patent rights. Daniel-Charles Trudaine's Bureau de Commerce was known to support textile innovations (and would later actively recruit immigrant inventors). Probably encouraged by the prospect of state support, in 1747, Kay left England for France (where he had never been before and did not speak the language).

=== State subsidy ===
Kay went to Paris, and throughout 1747 negotiated with the French government (in English) to sell them his technology.

Denied the huge lump sum he wanted, Kay finally agreed to 3,000 livres plus a pension of 2,500 livres (annually from 1749) in exchange for his patent, and instruction in its use (to the manufactures of Normandy). He retained the sole rights to shuttle production in France, and brought three of his sons to Paris to make them. Although wary of entering the manufacturing provinces (because of his experiences with rioting weavers in England) he was prevailed upon to do so.

At one time, the French authorities may have discouraged his communication with England, but Kay wrote about the unanticipated use of his technology in England to the French government: "My new shuttles are also used in England to make all sorts of narrow woollen goods, although their use could have been more perfect had the weavers consulted me".

The beginning of mechanisation in French textile production is traditionally dated to 1753, with the widespread adoption of the flying shuttle there. Most of these new shuttles were copies, not made by the Kays. John Kay unsuccessfully tried to enforce his manufacturing monopoly and began to quarrel with the French authorities, briefly returning to England in 1756 (it is said that he was in his Bury home in 1753 when it was vandalised by a mob and that he narrowly escaped with his life, but this is probably a 19th-century tale based on earlier Colchester riots; Kay was probably in France throughout the early 1750s).

He found his prospects in England unimproved, and by 1758 he was back in France, which became his adopted country, though he was to visit England at least twice more. In the winter of 1765–1766 he appealed to the Royal Society of Arts to reward him for his inventions, and exhibited his card-making machine for them. The Society could find no one who understood the shuttle, and there was a breakdown in correspondence, so that no award was ever made. He was in England again in 1773 but returned to France in 1774, at the age of 70, having lost his pension.

=== Later life ===
His offer to teach pupils if the pension were restored was not taken up, and Kay spent his remaining years developing and building machines for cotton manufacturers in Sens and Troyes. Though he was busy with engineering and letter-writing until 1779, he received only 1,700 livres from the French state over these five years, reaching a state of penury in March 1778 before receiving his final advance (to develop yet more machinery).

His last known letter, dated 8 June 1779, listed his latest achievements for the Intendant de Commerce and proposed further inventions. But since these were never made, and no more is heard of the 75-year-old Kay, it is believed that he must have died later in 1779.

== Legacy ==
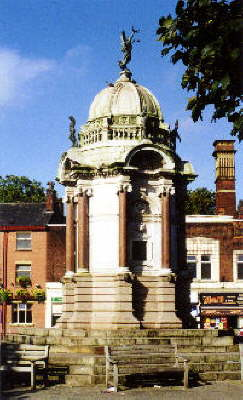
John Kay memorial, Bury

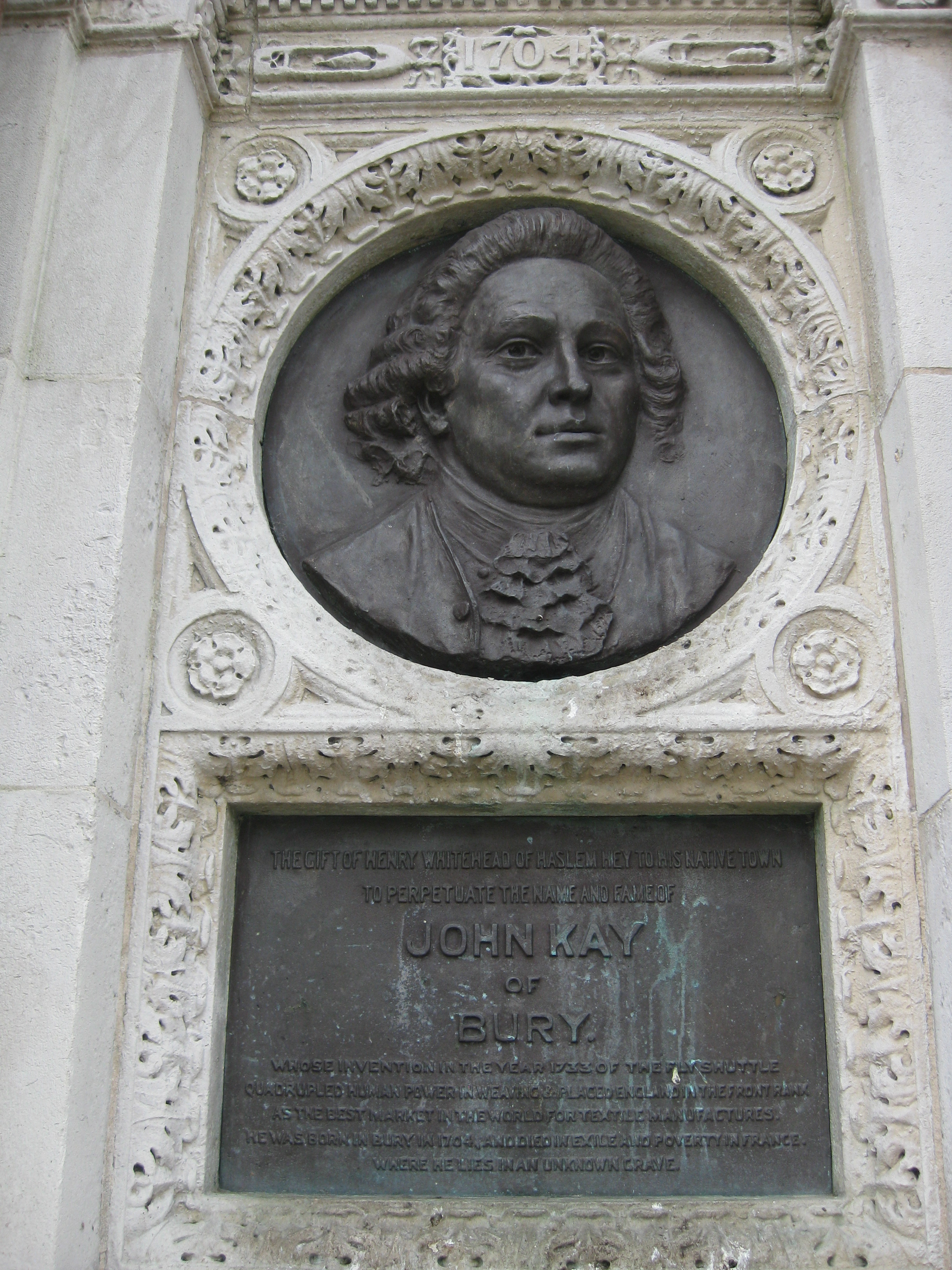
Portrait inscription on the John Kay Memorial

In Bury, Kay has become a local hero: there are still several pubs named after him, as are the Kay Gardens. Bury town centre has William Venn Gough's 1908 Memorial to John Kay (sculpture by John Cassidy). Planning began after a 1903 Bury public meeting launched a public subscription. 19th-century efforts to acknowledge Kay achieved little, but by 1903 it was felt that Bury "owed John Kay's memory an atonement", and that all Bury should contribute in restitution to "that wonderfully ingenious and martyred man".

John Kay's son, Robert, stayed in Britain, and in 1760 developed the "drop-box", which enabled looms to use multiple flying shuttles simultaneously, allowing multicolour wefts.

His son John ("French Kay") had long resided with his father in France. In 1782 he provided an account of his father's troubles to Richard Arkwright, who sought to highlight problems with patent defence in a parliamentary petition.

Ford Madox Brown portrayed Kay and his invention in a mural painting in Manchester Town Hall.

=== Thomas Sutcliffe ===
In the 1840s, one of Kay's great-grandsons, Thomas Sutcliffe, campaigned to promote a Colchester heritage for Kay's family. In 1846 he unsuccessfully sought a parliamentary grant for Kay's descendants in compensation for his ancestor's treatment in England. He was inaccurate in the details of his grandfather's genealogy and story, and his "Fanciful and Erroneous Statements" were discredited by John Lord's detailed examination of primary sources.

== See also ==
- Bradford Industrial Museum
