= Black Jackson =

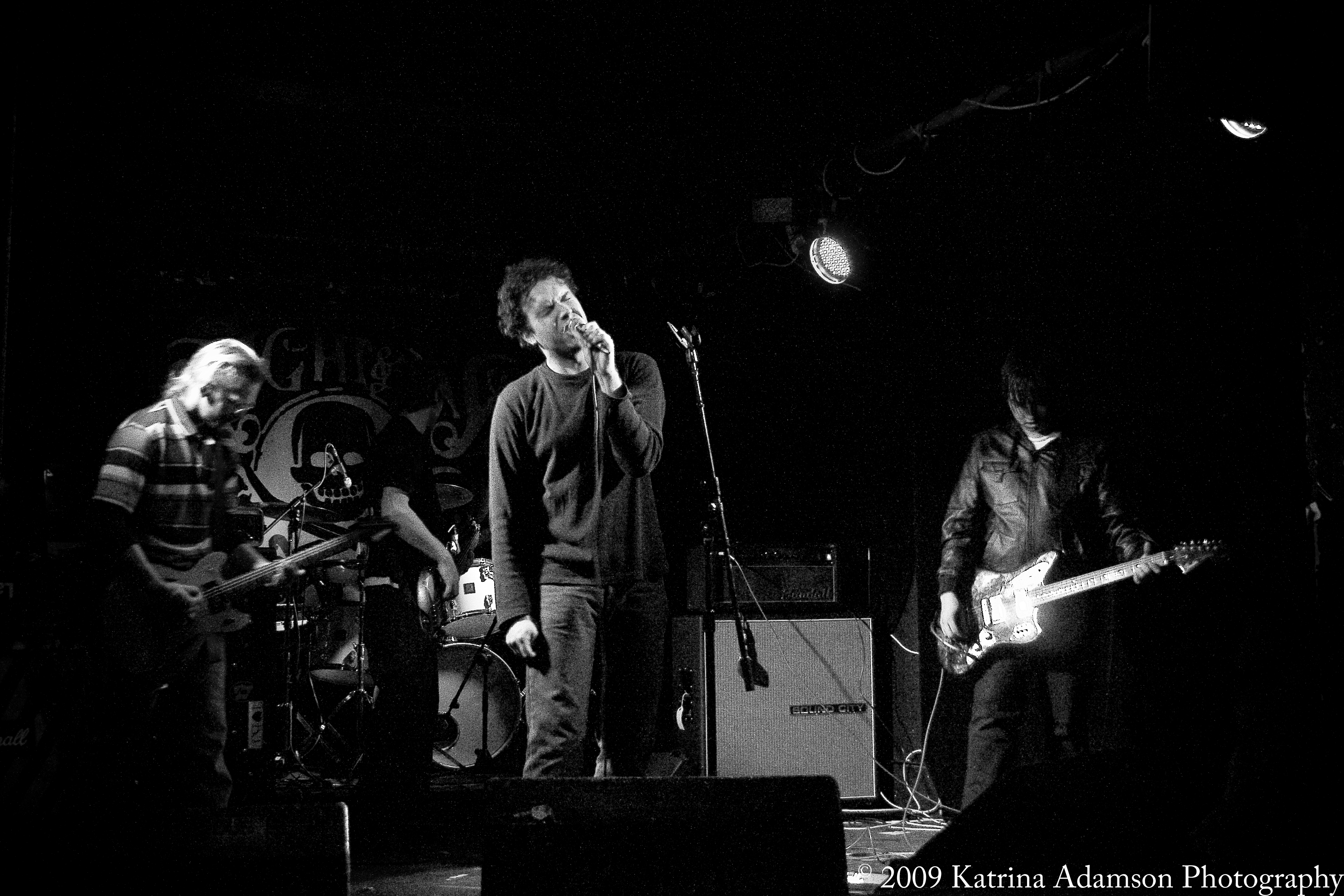
- Black Jackson

Background information
- Origin: Radcliffe, Greater Manchester, England
- Genres: Alternative rock, punk, metal, indie
- Years active: 2000–present
- Label: Recreation Records
- Members: Alexander Kowalczuk; Rob Ormerod; Pete Heywood; Johnny Pilling; Michael Irving
- Website: www.blackjackson.org

Black Jackson are an alternative rock band from Radcliffe, Greater Manchester, England, formed in 2000. The band consists of Alexander Kowalczuk (lead vocals), Rob Ormerod (guitar), Pete Heywood (guitar, keyboards), Johnny Pilling (bass) and Michael Irving (drums). The band were originally a four-piece: keyboard player and rhythm guitarist Pete Heywood joined the band after working with them on a side project with Andy Chester's My Computer. The side project was the 5th My Computer album eViL sPaNiSh recorded in 5 months in Pioneer Mill, Radcliffe where Black Jackson and their friends had built rehearsal studios and a live room for gigs.

The band are working on their first full studio length album, after having released demos and samplers. The title of the album remains to be confirmed and the band have given away no clues as to its content. The band's "Howl" Demo (Released Aug 2006) won critical acclaim for the single "Don't Revolve", from Paul Lester of The Guardian, who proclaimed it to be "jaunty in the same weird, haunting, dark-folky way that early James were before they became a clapalong stadium attraction – a classic example of mystique-blowing", one of the band's previous releases the "End of Evermore" E.P (Released Feb 2005), gained Lester's attention for its flagship single, "The Boy Became A Voodoo Doll". a single that Lester claims "starts off gently and, at its most severe, sounds a bit like John Lydon circa PiL's Metal Box shrieking in tongues about Prozac and torture and bruises". This single has proved to be a success for the band, after being the Times Online's hottest download for 26 April 2009, billed as "Sepulchral, twisted northern soul from the Manchester newcomers"

On 20 October 2006, Michelle Hussey of the BBC attended a Black Jackson show and claimed that "complete Black Jackson experience is an absolute thrill". Even Earlier, the bands 3-track demo "As Seen on T.V" was reviewed by David Adair of losingtoday.com and said to be "The Clash given a modern indie coating in the title track that spews out honesty and grit"

Though so far entirely self distributed, Andy Loynes of Manchester Confidential claims, "The odds, then, are that Black Jackson are the real deal". The band has signed to the independent label Recreation records, and will be looking to release their album soon.

== Discography ==
- The White Label (March 2003)
- The Future's Female (Feb 2004)
- End of Evermore (Feb 2005)
- As Seen on TV (Aug 2005)
- Howl Demo (Aug 2006)
- Sorry I don't know Demo (Jan 2007)
- And So It Is (Feb 2007)
