= John Just =

English archaeologist and botanist

John Just (1797 – 14 October 1852) was an English archaeologist and botanist.

== Life ==
Just, eldest son of Jonathan Just, farmer, was born in the village of Natland, two miles from Kendal in Westmorland, on 3 Dec. 1797. After attending the village school he was employed on a farm, but, being of studious tastes, was sent, at the age of fourteen, to Kendal grammar school. Carus Wilson of Casterton Hall noticed his ability, and in 1812 took him into his house, sending him to Kirkby Lonsdale grammar school for five years. While at Casterton Hall he engraved ciphers upon the family plate, made barometers, and commenced his investigations on Roman roads. About 1817 he became for a short time classical assistant to the Rev. John Dobson at Kirkby Lonsdale school, and pursued his favourite study of botany in the neighbourhood. From 1832 till his death he was second master of Bury Grammar School, devoting much of his leisure to private teaching, and acting as actuary of the Bury Savings Bank.

Just was elected lecturer on botany at the Pine Street (afterwards the Royal Manchester) School of Medicine and Surgery in September 1833, and lectured annually from 1834 to 1852. On 22 Jan. 1839 he was chosen a corresponding member of the Manchester Literary and Philosophical Society. In October 1848 he was appointed honorary professor of botany at the Royal Manchester Institution, and delivered three courses of lectures there, 1849–51. He closely studied chemistry and its application to the analysis of soils and manures. Three of his agricultural essays are printed in the ‘Transactions’ of the Literary and Philosophical Society of Manchester, namely, ‘On the Philosophy of Farming’ (1845, vii. 574), ‘On the Maturation of Grain and Farming Produce’ (ib. viii. 297), and ‘On Faults in Farming’ (ib. ix. 93). On 27 Sept. 1850 he delivered before the Bury Agricultural Society ‘A Lecture on the Value and Properties of Lime for Agricultural Purposes,’ which was printed as a pamphlet.

He acquired a good knowledge of ancient and modern languages, and specially studied Anglo-Saxon. For the ‘Transactions’ of the Manchester society he wrote on ‘Certain Anglo-Saxon Roots nearly obsolete in the English Language’ (1843, vii. 391), on ‘Anglo-Saxon Patronymics’ (ib. vii. 440), and on the ‘Self-acquirement of Languages’ (ib. 16 April 1850), not printed. His latest essay, contributed to a local society called ‘The Rosicrucians,’ on 6 Sept. 1852, was on ‘The Derivation of Local Names.’ He left unpublished four quarto manuscript volumes, an unfinished dictionary or lexicon of English words and their derivations, with similar words of similar meanings in cognate and kindred languages; and compiled ‘A Glossary of the Westmoreland Dialect as spoken in the neighbourhood of Kendal.’ He succeeded in deciphering the Runic inscriptions in the Isle of Man (printed in Joseph Tain's ‘History of the Isle of Man’). His knowledge of the Roman roads which traverse Lancashire—the subject of many of his papers for learned societies—led to his temporary connection with the officers of the ordnance during their survey of the county. On the congress of the British Archæological Association being held at Manchester and Lancaster in August 1850, Just superintended excavations at Ribchester which resulted in the discovery of interesting Roman remains, which are described in the ‘Journal’ of the association (vi. 229–51).

He died at Bury on 14 October 1852, aged 55, and was buried in St. Paul's churchyard on 20 October.
