= Pindown =

Behaviour management method

Pindown was a method of behaviour management used in children's homes in Staffordshire, England in the 1980s. It involved isolating children, sometimes for weeks on end, and in some cases drove children to the verge of suicide. Following expressions of concern, the council ordered a public inquiry into the practice of "Pindown". The subsequent report condemned the practice as "unethical, unprofessional and illegal"; the report had a major impact on children's law in the United Kingdom.

== Background ==
Staffordshire children's homes were, in the 1980s, an underfunded and understaffed part of a department that was required to find £1.5M in cuts. They were also severely overcrowded; the log books of The Birches notes that on one occasion, 30 children were playing five-a-side football whilst that of 245 Hartshill Road records an instance of 20 children playing the game; in each case, the maximum number of residents in each home was exactly half those recorded - 15 at The Birches and 10 at Hartshill Road. It was also noted that a boy who absconded from The Birches returned to find there was no bed for him; he spent the night on the floor.

On 2 October 1989 John Spurr, a deputy director of Staffordshire County Council's social services department, was telephoned by a Stoke-on-Trent solicitor, Kevin Williams, who was extremely concerned about a 15‑year‑old girl for whom he was acting in care proceedings. She had made allegations of abuse in the children's home at 245 Hartshill Road and had broken her ankle in seeking to escape from the home. The following day, Barry O'Neill (Director of Social Services) issued instructions that pindown must cease at Hartshill Road. When the issue was publicised, the county council determined that a public inquiry must be held.

O'Neill later noted that, in such a straitened system, there had been "a clear policy decision to let [Tony Latham – the social worker in charge] get on with it and not to interfere as long as he 'produced the goods'."

== The practice ==
Pindown was a behaviour management policy developed by social worker Tony Latham in the 1980s. It began as a strict control regime; children were often required to wear pyjamas in order to prevent their absconding, but this practice encountered little success; the local police complained that they were still spending too much time dealing with runaways. Pindown was first practised in the children's residential home at 245 Hartshill Road, Stoke-on-Trent, but later spread to other such homes in the county.

Children were regularly deprived of their clothing and footwear, being required to wear either pyjamas or just their underwear. They were locked in rooms called "pindown rooms", sometimes for periods of weeks or months, similar to a lockdown in prisons. The children were kept in solitary confinement with little furniture (and sometimes no bedding), no conversation and repetitive occupations. On occasion, they were required to perform physical exercise outdoors in their underwear and were subjected to corporal punishment; sometimes they were also deprived of food, water or lavatory paper, not allowed to go to the lavatory at all, or were doused in cold water. Log books for the institutions simply recorded such treatment as "loss of privileges". The Pindown schedule included "Rise and bath" at 0700hrs then "Bed and lights out" at 1900hrs (after another bath at 1800hrs).

An internal document from one home notes (in block capitals) that, amongst other rules:

- 1. Clothes must be removed and stored in the office on arrival...
- 3. Residents are allowed nightwear, underwear and dressing gown. No footwear of any description.
- 4. All meals must be eaten in the bedroom. If a child wishes to go the bathroom, have a drink or impart information they must knock on their door and wait for a member of staff to answer.
- 5. Residents are not allowed to communicate with each other.
- 6. Residents are not allowed personal possessions.
- 7. Residents are not allowed television, music, magazines, cigarettes or telephone calls. Visits from social workers are allowed by arrangement with the team leader. Parents wishing to visit must arrange this thru' [sic] the team leader...

Between 1983 and 1989, at least 132 children, aged nine and upwards, experienced what came to be called pindown. Duration of individual punishments varied in length but, in one instance, lasted 84 continuous days - longer than the subsequent public inquiry. It was punishment for such activities as running away from the home, truanting from school, petty theft, bullying and threats of violence.

== Public inquiry ==
The Pindown Inquiry (held in 1990–1991) was chaired by Allan Levy QC LLB (a noted children's advocate) and Barbara Kahan OBE MA (Cantab) (chair of the National Children's Bureau).

=== Evidence ===
The inquiry lasted 75 days, taking oral evidence from 70 witnesses including:

- Mark Fisher, the MP for Stoke-on-Trent
- 7 members of the county council
- 5 senior officers of the county council, including the chief executive
- 42 members of staff of the social services department and 8 former members of staff
- 15 individuals and representatives of organisations such as the BASW and the MSC

It received written submissions from a further 26 witnesses. There were also 57 witnesses who gave evidence anonymously, including children, their parents and others who asked not to be named.

The inquiry examined approximately 150,000 pages of documents including:

- 400 log books from children’s homes
- personnel files
- committee papers
- financial records
- minutes
- staff meeting minutes
- 21 legal references, including the Bill of Rights 1689 and the children's legislation from as early as 1933 and as late as 1989
- 51 reports from bodies as varied as HM Government and The Children's Society.

After almost a year, the inquiry produced a 300-page report. It recorded the "Pindown Experience" of seven specific children, but noted that the system had applied to as many as 132 children.

=== Findings ===
The report concluded that the pindown system was perceived as "narrow, punitive and harshly restrictive", and that under the system children suffered "despair" and "humiliation". It consisted of "the worst of institutional control" and stemmed initially from "an ill-digested understanding of behavioural psychology", was "inexplicable" and "wholly negative".

The report asserted that pindown was intrinsically "unethical, unprofessional and unacceptable" and breached Community Homes Regulations and Secure Accommodation Provisions. It lacked professional oversight and "middle management" had proved itself lacking.

The report further asserted that Tony Latham "bears responsibility for the creation of Pindown and the use of it" and that, whilst Latham might have been driven by "an excess of energy and enthusiasm" he had "lost sight of minimum standards of behaviour and professional practice." Staffordshire Constabulary, teachers, the probation service and the Social Services Inspecorate, the report noted, had all failed the children of Staffordshire. Management in Staffordshire's social services department was "inadequate", as were supervision, staffing and training.

=== Recommendations ===
The report offered detailed, key recommendations. Aside from recommending the immediate cessation of pindown, the inquiry made 39 recommendations in total. Amongst other things, it recommended that:

- there be increased measures of control by social service departments in Staffordshire and elsewhere
- log books in residential establishments be maintained fully and clearly
- that statutory visitors to residential establishments should highlight the question of "control"
- that statutory visits should be made without warning
- that the law be amended so that regulations of restriction of children in care be less vague
- that each residential facility should have both a designated officer and a deputy designated officer
- that each residential facility should record all visitors

There were 39 recommendations in total.

The report led to the Quality Protects initiative, launched by the Department of Health in 1998, which sought to improve a range of childcare services.

== See also ==
- Institutional abuse
- Cleveland child abuse scandal
- Social care in England

== Bibliography ==
- Allan Levy QC; Barbara Kahan (1991). The Pindown Experience and the Protection of Children (PDF). Stafford: Staffordshire County Council. p. 167. Archived from the original (PDF) on 24 November 2016.
