= National Children's Bureau =

The National Children’s Bureau works collaboratively across the issues affecting children to influence policy and get services working together to deliver a better childhood. Established in 1963, they have been at the forefront of campaigning for children and young people’s rights for over 60 years. They have offices in Hackney and Lambeth, London and Northern Ireland. They employ over 120 people. NCB also hosts the Anti-Bullying Alliance, Childhood Bereavement Network, Council for Disabled Children, Sex Education Forum, and LEAP.

== History ==
The National Children's Bureau was organized as the National Bureau for Co-operation in Child Care in 1963, with a combination of public and private funding. The child psychologist Mia Kellmer Pringle was tapped as its founding director, and she led the NCB until her retirement in 1981. Under her leadership, the organisation grew from a small-scale operation with four employees to a staff of 65 working out of a dedicated building. On the NCB management staff from 1971-1974 was the social work educator and notorious child abuser Peter Righton.

Beginning in 1964, Mia Kellmer Pringle and Dr. Neville Butler codirected the National Child Development Study, an influential longitudinal study that surveyed the development of a cohort of 17,000 children. The initial conclusions of the survey were published by the NCB in the 1973 book "Born to Fail?"

== Leadership ==
NCB's chief executive (since 2014) is Anna Feuchtwang. Her predecessor from 2011 to 2014 was Dr Hilary Emery. Prior to that, Sir Paul Ennals was NCB's Chief Executive from 1998.

Alison O’Sullivan was appointed Chair of NCB in January 2019, in succession to Elaine Simpson who had served since September 2012.

Baroness Tyler of Enfield is NCB's president. Her predecessor was Baroness Shireen Ritchie, who died in April 2012, and who had been President of NCB since November 2010.
