= County Borough of Bury =

Former local government district in the UK

Coordinates: 53°35′N 2°17′W

Bury
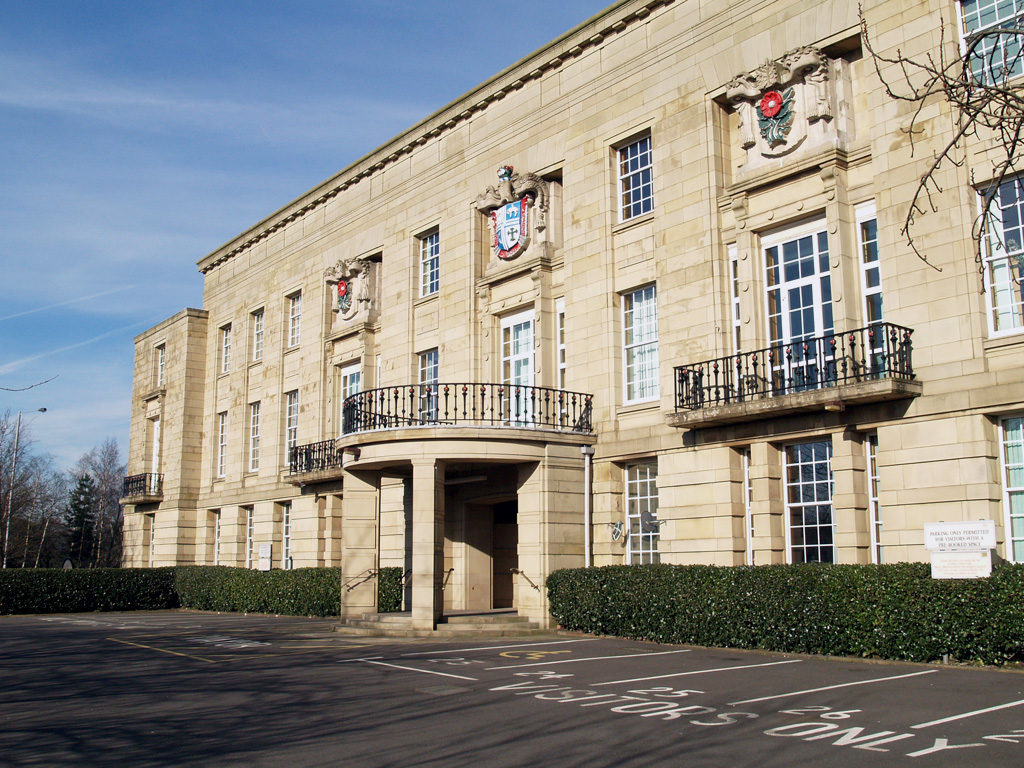
- Bury Town Hall
- Area
  - 1911: 5,907 acres (23.90 km^{2})
  - 1961: 7,433 acres (30.08 km^{2})
- Population
  - 1901: 58,029
  - 1971: 67,870
- History
  - Created: 1846
  - Abolished: 1974
  - Succeeded by: Metropolitan Borough of Bury
- Status: Improvement commissioners district 1846–1876; Municipal borough 1876–1889; County borough 1889–1974
- Government
  - HQ: Bury Town Hall
  - Motto: Vincit Omnia Industria (Industry overcomes all things)
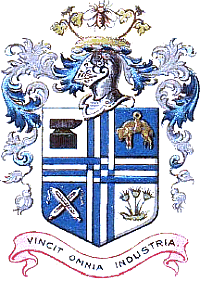

Bury was a local government district centred on Bury in the northwest of England from 1846 to 1974.

Under the Bury Improvement Act 1846 (9 & 10 Vict. c. ccxciii) a board of twenty-seven improvement commissioners was formed for Bury. The improvement commissioners district was enlarged in 1872. A charter of incorporation dated 9 September 1876 created the town a municipal borough and it was further extended in 1885.

Under the Local Government Act 1888 Bury was constituted a county borough. This meant that it was independent of Lancashire County Council, exercising both the powers of a borough and county council. However, Bury remained in Lancashire for judicial and other purposes such as lieutenancy and shrievalty. The county borough was extended in 1911 when it gained the Warth area from Radcliffe Urban District and in 1933 when it absorbed much of the dissolved Bury Rural District.

The County Borough of Bury was abolished by the Local Government Act 1972 and its territory transferred to Greater Manchester to form the central part of the Metropolitan Borough of Bury.

== Corporation ==
On incorporation the borough was divided into five wards: Church, Redvales, East, Moorside and Elton. The corporation consisted of a mayor, ten aldermen and thirty councillors, with six councillors and one alderman returned for each ward. On the extension of the borough in 1933 the size of the borough council was increased to thirty-three councillors and eleven aldermen. In 1969 wards were reorganised and the council increased in size to thirty-six councillors and twelve aldermen.

=== Politics ===
The members elected to the early borough council did not use political labels. However, by 1901 the borough was under the control of the Liberal Party. In 1904 Conservatives and Liberal Unionists gained a majority. In the following year the first Labour councillors were elected. The council was under no overall control (although generally with a pro-Conservative administration) until 1937. In that year Conservatives gained an overall majority, which it held until 1945. The Labour Party briefly held power in 1946–1947. The council returned to Conservative control in 1947, and the party was in control for twenty-one of the next twenty-five years, and was the largest party for the remainder of the period. At the final election of the council in 1972 Labour took control.

== Coat of arms ==
A coat of arms was granted to the borough by the College of Arms on 28 February 1877.

The symbols displayed in the four quarters represented local industry. They were an anvil, for iron forging; a golden fleece, for wool; a pair of crossed shuttles, for the cotton industry; and a papyrus plant for the paper trade. The quarters were divided by a "cross party and fretty". The crest above the shield was a bee, symbolic of industry in general, between two cotton flowers.

The Latin motto chosen was Vincit Omnia Industria or "work conquers all".

The blazon of the arms was as follows:

Quarterly argent and azure, a cross party and fretty counterchanged between an anvil sable in the first quarter, a fleece Or in the second, two shuttles in saltire threads pendent proper in the third, and three culms of the papyrus plant issuing from a mount vert also proper in the fourth.
And for a Crest: On a wreath of the colours, Upon a mount a bee volant between two flowers of the cotton-tree slipped all proper.

== Utilities ==
=== Water supply ===
The Bury and Radcliffe Waterworks Company was initially formed as the Bury Waterworks Company by the Bury Water Act 1838 (1 & 2 Vict. c. xxix), before being reincorporated by the Bury and Radcliffe Waterworks Act 1853 (16 & 17 Vict. c. xxxi). It built Calf Hey Reservoir.

The Haslingden and Rawtenstall Waterworks Company was formed by the Haslingden and Rawtenstall Waterworks Act 1853 (16 & 17 Vict. c. lxxxix).

Under the Bury Improvement Act 1872 (35 & 36 Vict. c. cxlvi), the Bury Improvement Commissioners acquired the two local water supply undertakings: the Bury and Radcliffe Waterworks Company and the Haslingden and Rawtenstall Waterworks Company. In 1876 this became the water department of Bury Corporation. In 1900 the corporation and eight adjoining local authorities formed the Bury and District Joint Water Board under the Bury and District Water (Transfer) Act 1900 (63 & 64 Vict. c. cxliv). Other than Bury, the water board's members were the municipal boroughs of Haslingden, Radcliffe and Rawtenstall, and the urban districts of Kearsley, Little Lever, Ramsbottom, Tottington and Whitefield. The Irwell Valley Water Board Act 1935 (25 & 26 Geo. 5. c. xxxii) renamed the undertaking the Irwell Valley Water Board. In 1960 the Irwell Valley Water Board was voluntarily absorbed by the Manchester Corporation Waterworks (including the supply to Bury) and the Bolton Corporation Waterworks.

=== Gas ===
In 1857 the Bury Improvement Commissioners purchased the private gasworks, which dated from 1828. The streets of the town were lit by gas from 1836. The corporation gas undertaking was nationalised by the Gas Act 1948, passing to the North Western Gas Board on 1 May 1949.

=== Electricity ===
The Corporation was granted powers in 1890 to supply electricity within the borough, and "to construct works and break up streets therein; to lay down wires and other apparatus; to levy rates and exercise other powers". In 1912, the town's Chamber Hall Power Station was opened. Bury Corporation Electricity Department continued to supply the town until 1948, when it passed to the North Western Electricity Board.

== Bury Corporation Transport ==
In 1899 Bury Corporation formed a tramways committee with the purpose of taking the privately owned steam trams operating in the town, and electrifying them. The first section of the Bury Corporation Tramways was opened on 3 June 1903. More lines were opened in 1904 and 1905, and extensions made in 1915. Bury trams reached Tottington, Unsworth and Whitefield outside the borough boundaries, and the corporation operated services on behalf of Radcliffe Urban District Council. A joint running arrangement was also made with Salford Corporation Transport. Motorbuses were first operated in 1925, and the last tram ran on 13 February 1949. In 1969 the borough's transport operations passed to SELNEC Passenger Transport Executive.
