= Angie Sammons =

Angie Sammons is a journalist and author from Liverpool who was editor of Liverpool Confidential from 2006 to 2018.

Between 1991 and 1993 she worked in Tokyo at The Japan Times and the Tokyo Journal. From 2003 to 2006 she was the chief sub editor of Sunday Express magazine and arts editor of the North West Enquirer, Prior to this, between 1994 and 2003, she worked at the Liverpool Daily Post latterly as features editor.
