= Radcliffe Road Baptist Church, Bury =

Church in Bury, Greater Manchester, England

Coordinates: 53.58060°N 2.30441°W

Radcliffe Road Baptist Church in Bury, Greater Manchester, England formerly known as Providence Baptist Chapel, was founded in 1835. The old building, completed in 1836, was on Bridge Street, Bury. However, since August 1983, the church building has been on Radcliffe Road, Bury, next to the Derby High School, originally in the old school kitchens, and since 2004 in a purpose-built red-brick church building. The church was revitalised from 1986 by Geoff King and David Higham. Since then it has been known for Biblical preaching and community activities such as the Friday Club for primary-age children.

Radcliffe Road Baptist Church is affiliated to the Grace Baptist Assembly connexion of churches, and the North West Gospel Partnership.
