= Elton, Greater Manchester =

Village in Greater Manchester, England

Coordinates: 53.592°N 2.315°W

Elton
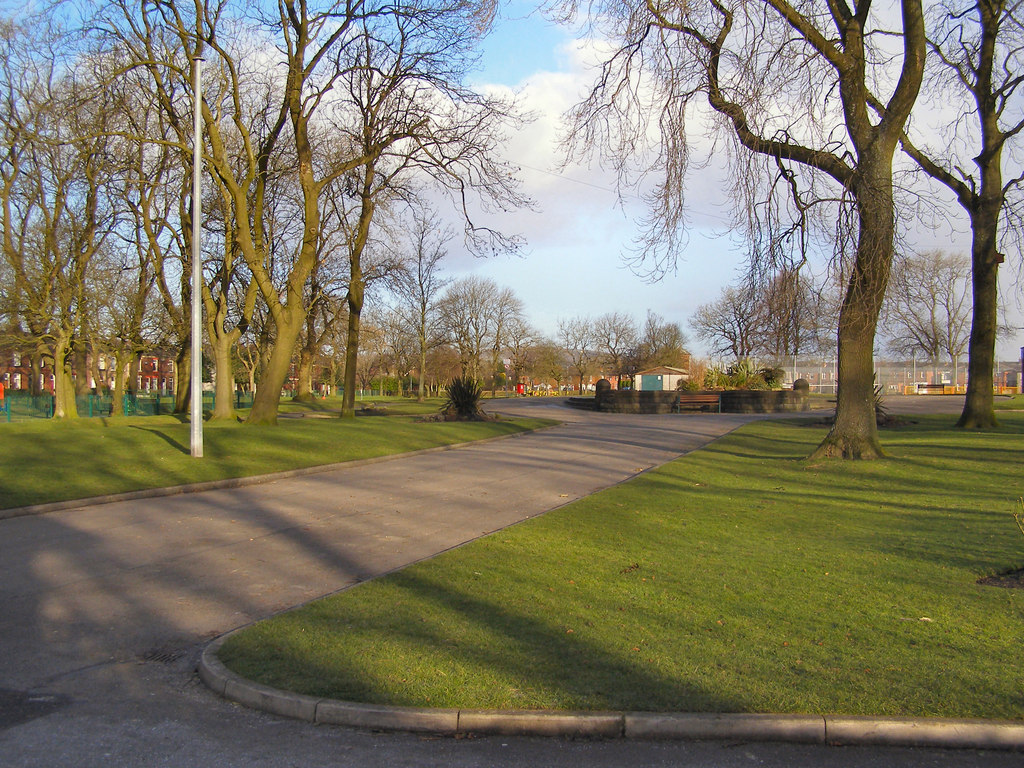
- Whitehead Park, Elton

- Location within Greater Manchester
- Population: 11,464 (2011)
- OS grid reference: SD791106
- Metropolitan borough: Bury
- Metropolitan county: Greater Manchester
- Region: North West
- Country: England
- Sovereign state: United Kingdom
- Post town: BURY
- Postcode district: BL8
- Dialling code: 0161
- Police: Greater Manchester
- Fire: Greater Manchester
- Ambulance: North West
- UK Parliament: Bury North

Elton is a suburb of Bury, in the county of Greater Manchester, England. The population of the ward at the 2011 census was 11,464. The River Irwell flows through the area via Burrs Country Park, formerly cotton mills, some features of which are still visible. Elton High School is named after the ward and is situated in the Western portion of the suburb.

== History ==
Elton was formerly a township in the parish of Bury and a chapelry, in 1866 Elton became a separate civil parish, on 30 September 1902 the parish was abolished and merged with Ramsbottom, Bury, Ainsworth and Radcliffe, part also went to form Tottington. In 1891 the parish had a population of 12,589.
