= Chamber Hall Power Station =

Former coal-fired power station in England

- Country: England
- Location: Bury, Greater Manchester
- Coordinates: 53.5973°N 2.2985°W
- Commission date: 1912
- Decommission date: 1969

Thermal power station
- Primary fuel: Coal

Power generation
- Nameplate capacity: 4,000 kW

Chamber Hall Power Station was a coal-fired power station situated in Bury, Greater Manchester. It was opened in 1912 by the Bury Corporation Electricity Department.

== Generating plant ==
When commissioned in 1912, the station had two John Musgrave & Sons steam turbines of the Zoelly impulse type, each driving a Siemens Brothers 2,000 kW alternator, generating a three-phase output of 6,000 V at 50 Hz. The station's three Woodeson boilers were supplied by Clarke Chapman & Co.

The station had its own railway siding connected to the adjacent Lancashire and Yorkshire Railway line.
