= Bury Market =

Open-air market in Greater Manchester, England

Coordinates: 53.5912°N 2.2945°W

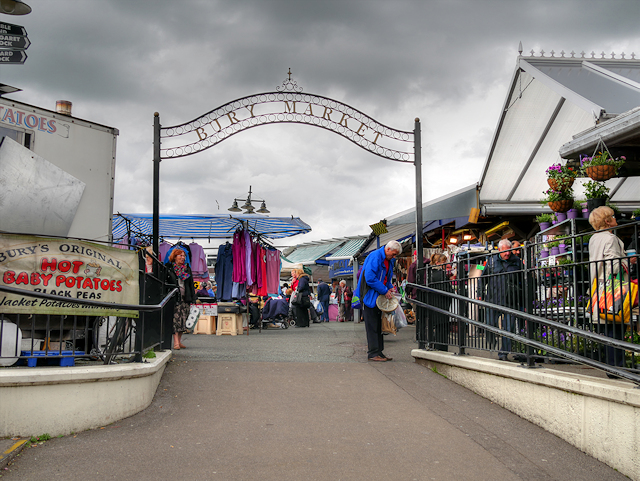
Bury Market

Bury Market is an open-air market in the town of Bury, Greater Manchester, England. It consists of a large market hall, with extensive stalls outside, selling fruit, flowers, clothing, hardware, groceries and crystals.

A new fish and meat market hall was constructed in the 1990s on the site of a former National Westminster Bank. The market opens on Wednesdays, Fridays and Saturdays. It is famed for its black pudding stalls and is near Bury's main shopping centre, Mill Gate. The open air market is only open on Wednesday, Friday and Saturday but the indoor market is open every day except Sunday.
