= Derby High School, Bury =

The Derby High School
- The Derby School Coat of Arms

Location
- Radcliffe Road; Bury, Greater Manchester, BL9 9NH; England; 53.5828°N 2.3073°W

Information
- Type: Community school
- Mottoes: Industria, Constantia, Sapientia. (Diligence, Determination, Wisdom); Inspired to make a difference
- Established: 1959
- Local authority: Bury
- Department for Education URN: 105355 Tables
- Ofsted: Reports
- Chair of governors: Jean Lund
- Head Teacher: Helen Hubert
- Gender: Coeducational
- Age: 11 to 16
- Patron: Earl of Derby
- Website: thederbyhighschool.co.uk

The Derby High School is a secondary school, located on Radcliffe Road, Bury, Greater Manchester, England. It opened in September 1959 as the Derby Grammar School, a new school that offered both a grammar and a technical education. Some of the pupils moved from Bury High School, a grammar school on nearby Parliament Street, which closed when the Derby opened. They had gone there having passed the eleven plus examination. Other pupils came from Bury Junior Technical School having attended that school from the age of 13 years. In September 1979 it became a comprehensive school and its sixth form was closed.

== History ==
The school's patron was the Earl of Derby, with the school's badge being based on the earl's coat of arms. Mr. G.A.C. Sawtell was the Headmaster from the opening until his retirement in 1977 when he was succeeded by Mr. Geoff Wolsternholme. The current Headmistress is Ms Helen Hubert who began leading Derby High School in 2016 after previous headteacher Ms Alison Byrne stepped down from teaching in the summer of 2015.

== Buildings and grounds ==
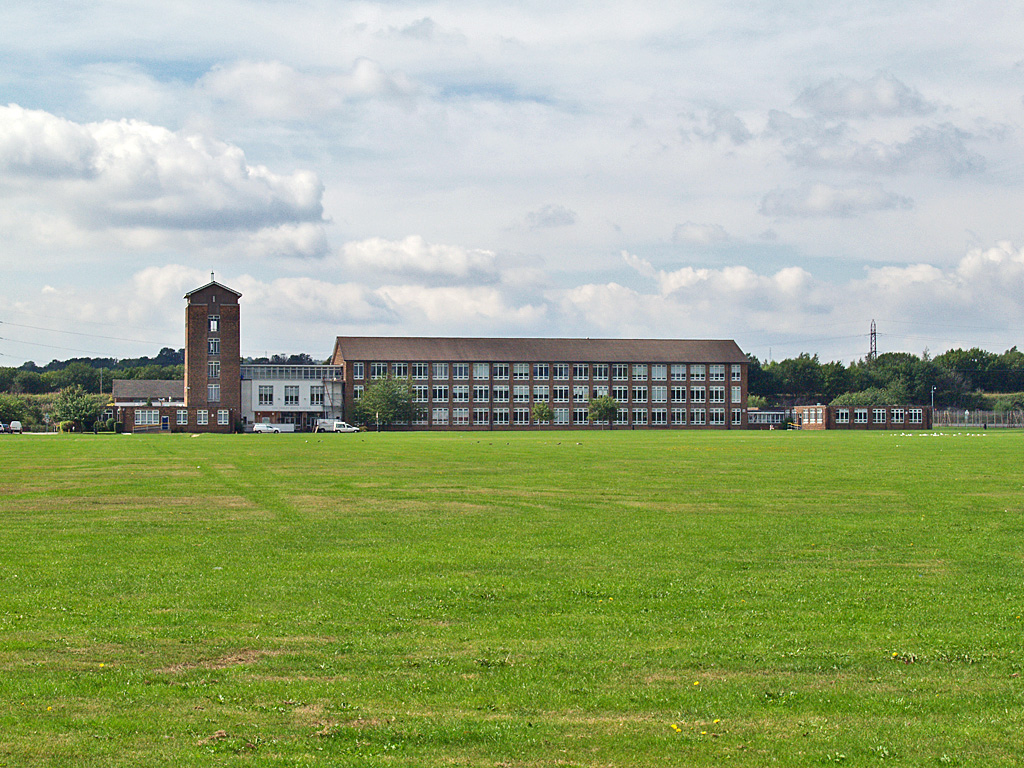
A view of Derby High School

The school is essentially a three storey building with a smaller single storey block at one end where Domestic Science and Practical Crafts such as woodwork and metalwork are taught. At the other end is the main entrance serving a large reception area, kitchen, offices and staff rooms. Above the reception area is the library and the school's distinctive tower. Behind the reception area is the school hall with a stage at the far end. Two gymnasiums run from the rear of the stage with one for boys at one side and opposite one for the girls.

There is also a small hut, originally used by the Sixth Form, behind the boys' gym. It was later used as a music room until it was recently converted to a dance and drama studio with its current name 'Inspire'. There is a caretaker's house at the side of the girls' gym. Extensive grounds lie at the front on the School; abutting the fields of Bury Church of England High School, Bury Rugby Union Football Club, Radcliffe Road and the grounds of Radcliffe Road Baptist Church, Bury, and the gardens of houses on Inglewhite Close. A recently constructed (2014) sports hall is situated at the "town end" of the main school building. To the rear of the school is a rough track and the embankment of the Manchester Metrolink Tram line. Access by car is via Radcliffe Road or by foot and bike via a path, off Manchester Old Road which passes Bury C of E High School, to the rear of the school.

The original boys sports hall was transformed into a new building with 2 floors. It was named "Create" with subjects hosted being Food Tech, Technology & Engineering as a course for Y10 & Y11. The top floor has 2 giant cooking rooms with 24 desks in each. With the lower floor having 2 tech rooms, an ICT suite and an engineering room. The old building where those subjects used to be was on the other side of school called T-block but was renamed to ExITe with a brand new ICT room and a PE classroom with a special needs area for people who need extra support. It was named "Include"

== Notable alumni and faculty ==
=== Alumni ===
- Susan Bassnett, Academic. Pro-Vice-Chancellor at the University of Warwick, Professor in the Centre for Translation and Comparative Cultural Studies and author of over 20 books.
- David Crausby, Member of Parliament (Labour) for Bolton North East from 1997 to 2019.
- Peter Skellern, Musician and Singer/Songwriter. First hit was "You're a Lady", in 1972, which reached number three in the UK Singles Chart.
- David Whittaker, Video Game Music Composer and Programmer, for most of the 1980s and early 1990s.
- Adam Yates, cyclist.
- Simon Yates, cyclist.

=== Faculty ===
- Dave Edmundson, P.E. teacher, went on to be Secretary of Lancashire County Cricket Club and then Chief Executive of Burnley Football Club. In 2007, he was appointed as general manager of a new body called the 'Football League Trust', to oversee Community and Youth Development activities at Football League clubs, arising from the Premier League's 'solidarity payments' to the League.
- Warren Bradley taught at the school in the mid '60s. He had played football for Manchester United immediately after the Munich air disaster. He was also capped for England. He coached the school first eleven which for a time included Jimmy Kerr, a young Scottish footballer who had come to the town to play for Bury.
