= Thomas Thompson (writer) =

Lancashire writer and broadcaster (1880–1951)

Thomas Thompson with L S Lowry

Thomas Thompson (1880–1951) was a Lancashire writer and broadcaster, whose work generally appeared under the name of T. Thompson. He lived all his life in Bury, an industrial town some ten miles north of Manchester.

== Early life ==
Thomas Thompson was born in Bury on 14 January 1880 to Thomas Thompson, a clog maker, and Ellen Greenhalgh, a cotton mill worker. By his eleventh birthday, the young Thompson was a ‘half-timer’, working half the day in the mill as a warehouse boy, and the other half at school. He once called his education “a poor do”. He left both school and mill as soon as he could. He worked as an errand runner and then as a printer's apprentice, gaining a silver medal for book-binding in 1898 from the Skinners’ Company. He continued to work as a book-binder until 1946. He married Ethel Heapy in 1911, and they had one child, Herbert.

Thomas Thompson's early years in Bury's Victorian slums are described in his autobiography, Lancashire for Me. Further discussion of Thompson's escape from slum and mill is provided in Rose's book on British working class intellectuals.

== Writing ==
Thompson drifted into writing at an early age, with articles on the countryside for his local newspaper, and a piece in the Sunday Chronicle. These were noticed by Gordon Phillips ("Lucio") at The Guardian, who invited him to write something longer. It turned into a regular column, the Plum Street Memoirs, based largely on the people in and around Wood Street in Bury, where he had spent most of his childhood.

Thompson's column ran through the 1920s, culminating in 1934 in Blind Alley, a novel about Plum Street's residents that J. B. Priestley described as a "very vivid and truthful novel of pre-war Lancashire working-class life." Thereafter, Thompson continued with a column of Lancashire portraits that appeared regularly in The Guardian to his death in 1951. He also published sixteen books about Lancashire people and their communities; these were mostly collections of short stories, the first in 1933, and all published by George Allen and Unwin. He wrote several plays, and helped to write two film scripts: Mario Zampi’s comedy thriller, Spy for a Day, starring Duggie Wakefield, and Carol Reed’s Penny Paradise, starring Betty Driver.

Thompson’s books and Guardian column were highly regarded and well-reviewed. The Welsh poet, Dylan Thomas, was an admirer. A.J.P. Taylor mentions Thompson in his volume, English History 1914-1945. A few years later, Taylor recalled that “For many years the stories of T. Thompson were the things I first read in The Manchester Guardian. He has had no successor.” When Thompson's Lancashire Lure came out in 1947, The Guardian’s reviewer felt “it is temperate to say that what Kipling was to India and what O. Henry was to New York that Thompson is to Lancashire.” Thompson's writing set a high standard of authenticity; he was, said Walter Greenwood, the “most Lancashire of Lancashire writers.” In 1950, the University of Manchester awarded him an honorary master's degree for his scholarly contribution to dialect literature.

== Broadcasting ==
Thompson broadcast on the BBC with programmes on Lancashire dialect, as well as over thirty sketches, stories and plays broadcast between 1937 and 1951, almost all of them about life in Lancashire towns and villages. He wrote a wartime series for the forces called Tom, Dick and Harry, and was a regular contributor of short stories to the Radio Times.

He was also responsible for seven of the nine episodes of Burbleton, an imaginary northern community created by BBC staff in 1937. His series, Under the Barber’s Pole, broadcast on the Home Service between 1947 and 1952, comprised dialect stories set in the fictional Lancashire village of Owlerbarrow, with Wilfred Pickles in the lead role. George Allen and Unwin published a collection of the stories in 1949.

He also took part in programmes about regional culture, music, painting, nursery schools, food, eccentrics, book clubs and BBC announcers, as well as making three programmes about Gracie Fields. They were friends - she, too, had been a half-timer in the mills - and he mentions their friendship in Lancashire for Me.

Thomas Thompson died in Bury on 15 February 1951. His last column for The Guardian was published posthumously. Wilfred Pickles later said of him that he was a writer “who captured life with all the accuracy and none of the flatness of a photograph, the brilliant and modest man of letters who was as unaffected as he was sincere.” His obituary in The Guardian reminded readers that he was a born writer, with an inspiration that was “nearer to genius than to talent.”

== Works ==
- Lancashire Mettle (1933) with a frontispiece by L. S. Lowry.
- Blind Alley (1934) novel, dedicated to Gordon Phillips ("Lucio") of The Guardian
- Song o’ Sixpence (1935) novel
- Lancashire Brew (1935), dedicated to A.S. Wallace
- Lancashire Lustre (1937), dedicated to Joseph Knight
- Cuckoo Narrow (1937) novel, dedicated to Rev. Henry Bett MA Litt.D.
- Stick-in-the Mud (1937) a one act comedy
- Lancashire Fun (1938) dedicated to Gracie Fields
- Lancashire Lather (1940)
- Lancashire for Me – Little Autobiography (1940) dedicated to Ann Gow, baby daughter of the actor Dame Wendy Hiller
- Lancashire Rampant (1943)
- Lancashire Pride (1945)
- Crompton Way (1947) novel
- Lancashire Lure (1947)
- Under the Barber’s Pole (1949)
- Lancashire Laughter (1950)
- The Lancashire Omnibus (1951)

(all published by George Allen and Unwin)

Thomas Thompson's stories and articles have also appeared in a number of anthologies, including:

- Fifty Great Years: the Evening Chronicle Golden Jubilee Book (1947), ed. H.J Denys, Kemsley Newspapers
- The Bedside Lilliput (1950), ed. R. Bennett, Hulton Press
- North Country Stories (1953), ed. A. G. Brooks, Faber
- My North Countrie: An Anthology of Poetry and Prose of the Northern Counties (1955), ed.W. Pickles, Allen and Unwin
- Lancashire of One Hundred Years Ago (1993), ed. John Hudson, Sutton
