= Bury Town Hall =

Municipal building in Bury, Greater Manchester, England

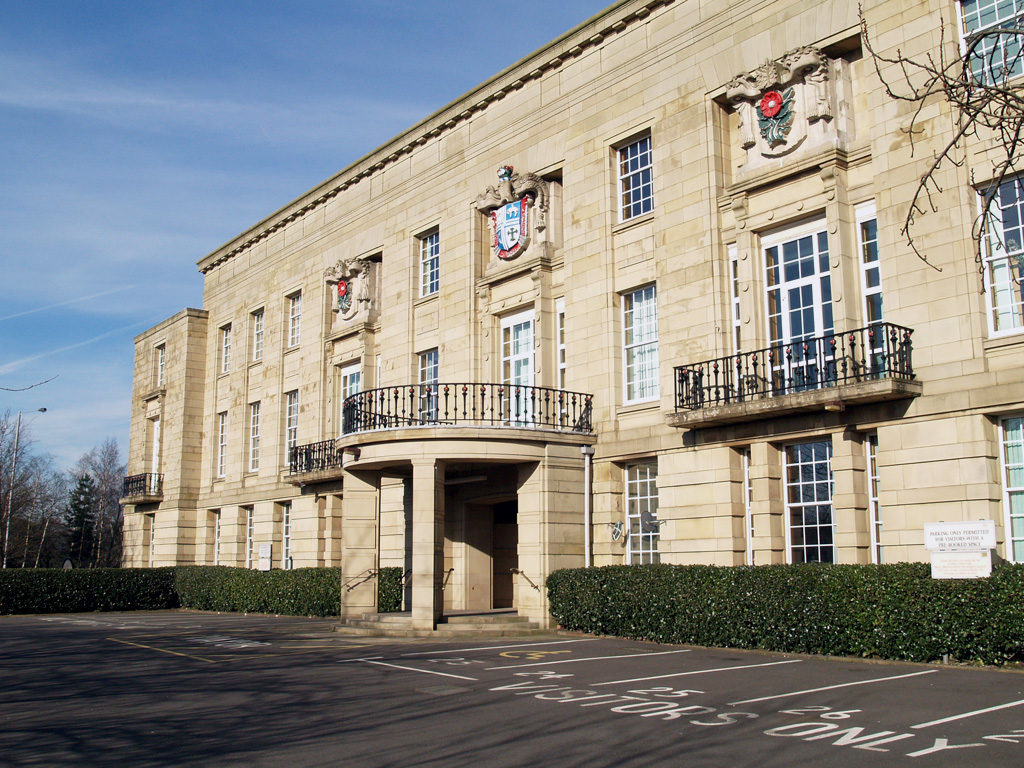
- Front view of Bury Town Hall, February 2008

- Shown in Greater Manchester
- 53.5902°N 2.3001°W
- Location: Knowsley Street, Bury

History
- Built: 1954

Site notes
- Architect: Reginald Edmonds
- Architectural style: Neo-Georgian style

Bury Town Hall is a municipal building in Knowsley Street, Bury, Greater Manchester, England. The town hall, which is the headquarters of Metropolitan Borough of Bury, is a locally listed building.

== History ==
Until the mid-20th century, Derby Hall on Market Street accommodated the local council offices, but was no longer fit for purpose. The new building was designed, following an architectural competition, by Reginald Edmonds in the Neo-Georgian style in the 1930s. Construction was delayed by the Second World War and it was only officially opened by Queen Elizabeth II on 22 October 1954. The design incorporated an assembly hall which became known as the Elizabethan Suite.

The Whitehead Clock Tower, a memorial to Walter Whitehead, a local surgeon, dedicated in June 1914 and George Frampton's 'cheering fusilier', a tribute to those soldiers who had died in the Second Boer War, erected in 1920, are both structures which predate the current town hall and stand in Whitehead Garden to the south of the building. The garden itself was a gift from Sidney and Katherine Whitehead of Stormer Hill in Bury to commemorate the lives of seven people who were killed in Chapel Street by a V-1 flying bomb on 24 December 1944 during the Second World War.

The town hall was the headquarters of the County Borough of Bury until 1974 when it became the headquarters of the enlarged Metropolitan Borough of Bury. A three-dimensional relief of the enlarged borough's coat of arms, designed by Diana Childs, was installed in the council chamber in the mid-1970s. The Prince of Wales visited the town hall for a lunch meeting with the civic dignitaries on 14 December 1977.

In July 1992 Queen Elizabeth II chose the town hall as her destination on her inaugural journey on the Manchester Metrolink; she had lunch in the building on her arrival.

The building had to be closed for weddings and other public events in July 2020 after part of the ceiling on the second floor collapsed.
