= Bury power station =

Former power stations in Greater Manchester, England

- Country: England
- Location: Bury, Lancashire (now Greater Manchester)
- Coordinates: 53°35′51″N 02°17′57″W
- Status: Decommissioned and demolished
- Commission date: 1896
- Decommission date: 1970
- Owners: Bury Corporation (1896–1948); British Electricity Authority (1948–1955); Central Electricity Authority (1955–1957); Central Electricity Generating Board (1958–1970)
- Operator: As owner

Thermal power station
- Primary fuel: Coal
- Turbine technology: Steam turbines
- Cooling source: River and cooling towers

Power generation
- Units operational: 1 x 6 MW, 2 x 10 MW
- Nameplate capacity: 26 MW
- Annual net output: 24.5 GWh (1954)

Bury power stations were two generating stations that supplied electricity to the town of Bury, Lancashire and the surrounding area from 1896 to 1970. They were owned and operated by Bury Corporation until the nationalisation of the British electricity supply industry in 1948. The power stations were rebuilt several times to replace older plant and to meet an increasing demand for electricity.

== History ==
In 1890 Bury Corporation applied for a Provisional Order under the Electric Lighting Acts to generate and supply electricity to the town. The Bury Electric Lighting Order 1890 was granted by the Board of Trade and was confirmed by Parliament through the Electric Lighting Orders Confirmation (No. 2) Act 1890 (54 & 55 Vict. c. clxxxvii). The corporation built a power station in Rochdale Road, Bury (53°35′39″N 2°17′19″W), from which the supply of electricity started on 5 November 1896.

The demand for electricity increased and a new larger generating station at Chamber Hall, Bury (53°35′51″N 2°17′57″W) was authorised in 1908. Construction started in 1909 and the first electricity was supplied from the new station in August 1911.

== Equipment specification ==
=== Rochdale Road ===
The original plant at Rochdale Road power station comprised Belliss engines coupled directly to Siemens dynamos, in 1898 the total capacity of the plant was 304 kW.

In 1923 the generating plant at Rochdale Road power station comprised:

- Coal-fired boilers producing up to 24,000 lb/h (3.02 kg/s) of steam, this was supplied to:
- Generators:
  - 2 × 250 kW reciprocating engine direct current generators
  - 2 × 500 kW reciprocating engine DC generators

These machines gave a total output of 1,500 kW of direct current.

Electricity supplies to consumers were at 440 and 220 Volts DC, DC traction supply was provided to the Bury Corporation tramways from its inception in 1903.

=== Chamber Hall 1911-1930 ===
By 1923 the plant at Chamber Hall comprised:

- Coal-fired boilers producing 251,000 lb/h (31.6 kg/s), these fed steam to:
- Generators
  - 2 × 2,000 kW turbo-alternators installed in 1911
  - 1 × 3,000 kW turbo-alternator installed in 1915
  - 1 × 6,000 kW Fraser and Chalmers/GEC single cylinder turbo-alternator, operating at 3000 rpm and 6.6 kV, 3-phase 50 Hz, installed in 1921

These machines gave a total output of 13,000 kW of alternating current.

Customers were supplied with 3-phase, 50 Hz AC at 400 and 230 Volts.

Further turbo-alternators were installed in 1924 (10 MW) and 1930 (10MW).

=== Chamber Hall 1954–1970 ===
In 1954 the plant at Chamber Hall power station comprised:

- Boilers:
  - 2 × 10,000 lb/h (1.26 kg/s each) Clarke Chapman vertical tube boilers with chain grate stokers, operating at 200/210 psi at 600 °F (13.8/14.5 bar at 316 °C),
  - 2 × 40,000 lb/h (5.04 kg/s each) Clarke Chapman vertical tube boilers with chain grate stokers, operating at 200/210 psi at 600 °F (13.8/14.5 bar at 316 °C),
  - 2 × 60,000 lb/h (7.56 kg/s each) Clarke Chapman cross drum with chain grate stokers, operating at 325 psi at 700 °F (2.4 bar at 371 °C), steam was supplied to:
- Turbo-alternators:
  - 1 × 6.0 MW turbo-alternator, installed in 1921, see specification above,
  - 1 × 10 MW Fraser and Chalmers/GEC single cylinder turbo-alternator, operating at 3000 rpm and 6.6 kV, 3-phase 50 Hz, installed in 1924,
  - 1 × 10 MW Metropolitan-Vickers two cylinder turbo-alternator, generating at 6.6 kV, 3000 rpm, 50 Hz, installed in 1930.

The installed capacity Chamber Hall was 26 MW with an output capacity of 16 MW.

Condenser cooling water was drawn from the nearby River Irwell and was cooled in two Peter Brotherhood wooden towers each with a capacity of 250,000 gallons/h (0.32 m^{3}/s) and with a cooling range of 20°F (11.1 °C).

Coal was supplied through a dedicated branch siding from the adjacent railway line.

== Operations ==
=== Operations 1921–23 ===
The final user supply from Rochdale Road and Chamber Hall stations for the period 1921–23 was:

Bury electricity consumer use for 1921–23
Electricity Use	Units	Year		
Electricity Use	Units	1921	1922	1923
Lighting and domestic	MWh	773	787	928
Public lighting	MWh	54	69	91
Traction	MWh	1,838	1,818	1,895
Power	MWh	8,778	6,885	10,728
Bulk supply	MWh	5,187	5,470	6,178
Total use	MWh	16,630	15,030	19,823

The electricity load on the system was:

	Units	1921	1922	1923
Maximum load	kW	6,095	6,436	8,130
Total connections	kW	12,500	12,495	12,350
Load factor	Per cent	34.6	29.5	331.1

The sale of electricity provided an income for Bury Corporation. In 1923 revenue from the sales was £87,039, the surplus of revenue over expenses was £34,802.

Rochdale Road station was operational in 1923 but was decommissioned sometime later. This may have been when one of the 10 MW machines was installed at Chamber Hall in 1924 and 1930, or when the trams started to be withdrawn from 1932. The station it does not appear on a map dated 1937.

=== Operations 1946 ===
Bury power station operating data for 1946 is given below.

Bury power station operating data, 1946
Load factor per cent	Max output load MW	Electricity supplied GWh	Thermal efficiency per cent
12.0	23,370	24.594	14.21

=== Nationalisation ===
The British electricity supply industry was nationalised in 1948 under the provisions of the Electricity Act 1947 (10 & 11 Geo. 6. c. 54). The Bury electricity undertaking was abolished, ownership of Bury power station was vested in the British Electricity Authority, and subsequently the Central Electricity Authority and the Central Electricity Generating Board (CEGB). At the same time the electricity distribution and sales responsibilities of the Bury electricity undertaking were transferred to the North Western Electricity Board (NORWEB).

=== Operations 1954–67 ===
Operating data for the period 1954–67 was:

Bury power station operating data, 1954–67
Year	Running hours or load factor (per cent)	Max output capacity MW	Electricity supplied GWh	Thermal efficiency per cent
1954	2661	20	24.375	14.20
1955	2973	20	23.228	15.03
1956	2483	20	15.120	16.05
1957	2540	16	15.534	14.52
1958	2490	16	13.649	15.37
1961	5.4 %	10	4.753	13.59
1962	5.2 %	10	4.521	12.34
1963	6.92 %	10	6.061	12.88
1967	8.2 %	10	7.189	16.17

== Bury electricity supply district ==
Following nationalisation the Bury electricity supply district was created. This covered an area of 41 square miles (106 square km) and included the County Borough of Bury, the boroughs of Heywood and Radcliffe, and the districts of Kearsley, Little Lever, Ramsbottom, Tottington and Whitefield. It served a population of 103,000 (1958). The number of consumers and electricity sold was:

Year	1956	1957	1958
Number of consumers	36,925	37,477	37,813
Electricity sold MWh	178,996	183,203	203,073

In 1958 the number of units sold to categories of consumers was:

Type of consumer	No. of consumers	Electricity sold MWh
Residential	33,431	45,690
Shops, offices, etc	2,194	14,785
Combined premises	1,242	4,640
Factories	640	134,273
Farms	302	1,884
Public lighting	4	1,801
Total	37,813	203,073

There were 408.5 miles (657 km) of underground mains and 86.7 miles (139.5 km) of overhead cables.

== Closure ==
Bury power station was decommissioned in about 1970. The buildings were subsequently demolished.

== See also ==
- Timeline of the UK electricity supply industry
- List of power stations in England
