= Fishpool =

Coordinates: 53.5836°N 2.296°W

- Location within Greater Manchester
- OS grid reference: SD803097
- Metropolitan borough: Bury
- Metropolitan county: Greater Manchester
- Region: North West
- Country: England
- Sovereign state: United Kingdom
- Post town: BURY
- Postcode district: BL9
- Dialling code: 0161
- Police: Greater Manchester
- Fire: Greater Manchester
- Ambulance: North West
- UK Parliament: Bury North

Fishpool is an area of Bury, in Greater Manchester, England. The area is roughly-speaking, a square bounded by Wellington Road to the north, Manchester Road to the west, Gigg Lane to the south and Market Street to the east.

== History ==
The neighbourhood grew up in the late 19th century and became known as 'Piano Town', as many of the lower middle class households had a piano in the parlour.

Its development was carried out by three contemporaries: Alderman Charles Brierley, who built Fishpool's first street and named it after himself. He resided at Heaton Cottage on Brierley Street. Alderman Brierley was mayor of Bury in 1889. The second and most prolific builder was John Inman. He built most of the streets as far as Nelson Street, from Wellington Road through to Parkhills Road and as far as to Gigg Lane. Inman Street, at the end of Manchester Old Road is named after him. Finally John Ward from Leigh, who was at one time landlord of the Church Inn on Spring Street. He built the Pack Horse Hotel and the shops alongside.

== Housing ==
The streets still mostly consist of garden terraced housing, set in a grid pattern. The main streets are Nelson Street, Devon Street, Horne Street and Brierley Street, with Handley Street, Woodley Street, Carlton Street, Sultan Street, Morley Street, Richmond Street, Walker Street, Grosvenor Street and Grafton Street being either later additions or horizontal link thoroughfares.

== Landmarks ==
The district was the home of Fishpool Infants School and St Chad's Junior School. Fishpool Infants School was demolished in 2006. Both schools closed in July 2003 and a new school was built on the site and utilising the old building of St Chad's. The new school was named St. Luke's C of E Primary School by popular vote in the community, and is a Voluntary Controlled school linked to the nearby Anglican church, St. Peter's. (OFSTED Number 133944). Redvales Children's Centre, built on the Springs Estate, was the first Children's Centre in the Metropolitan Borough of Bury, and served the whole of the 6 townships, originally operating from a suite of small rooms above a shop on Heywood Street. Opposite the row of shops is the church building formerly Bethesda Church, now known as Metro Christian Centre. The church is a place of worship for evangelical Christians and also serves the community in many other ways, such as hosting a private day nursery, Little Acorns, and regular blood donor sessions. There is a row of shops on Parkhills Road, including a post office, a Co-op. (Now a Morrisons store) and several takeaway establishments. There is a public houses on the fringe of the district, namely The Staff of Life. There were originally many corner shops on the minor streets, but these have long since disappeared. The district is home to Bury F.C. who play at Gigg Lane. Gigg Lane also has an entrance to the town's main cemetery.
