= Bury Corporation Tramways =

Tramway operator in England

Operation
- Locale: Bury
- Open: 3 June 1903
- Close: 13 February 1949
- Status: Closed

Infrastructure
- Track gauge: 1,435 mm (4 ft 8 1/2 in)
- Propulsion system: Electric
- Depots: George Street and Foundry Street

Statistics
- Route length: 13.67 miles (22.00 km)

Bury Corporation Tramways operated a tramway service in Bury, Greater Manchester, England between 1903 and 1949.

== History ==
Services started on 3 June 1903, on the first line to Fairfield. The tram depot site was located between George Street and Foundry Street. The power station operated by Bury Corporation Electricity Department, was on the opposite side of Rochdale Road, near to Derby Street.

Routes were opened as follows:

- 3 June 1903 Jericho to Moorside
- 21 May 1904 Moorside to Bury
- 21 April 1904 Heap Bridge to Bury via Heywood St, Spring St and Frederick St
- 29 April 1904 Bury to Rochdale Road (Heywood St) via Princess St
- 20 May 1904 Bury to Limefield
- 20 July 1904 Bury to Unsworth boundary and Whitefield Station
- 10 August 1904 Bury to Barracks (Bolton Rd)
- 16 September 1904 Bury to Tottington
- 4 January 1905 Radcliffe Bridge to Whitefield
- 18 April 1905 Radcliffe Bridge to Stopes
- 5 May 1905 Radcliffe Bridge to Black Lane
- 24 June 1905 Bury to Radcliffe Town Hall
- 20 May 1907 Bury to Barracks extended to Breightmet
- 17 November 1905 Bury to Rochdale Road extended from Heap Bridge to Heywood Market Place and Hopwood
- 24 February 1915 Moorside to Bury extended to Smethurst Hall, and Bury to Limefield extended to Walmersley; authorised by the Bury Corporation Tramways Order 1915

By this time the company transported 16 million passengers a year,

In 1925 an agreement was reached with Rochdale Corporation Tramways for through running to Rochdale and 1926 a joint service with Salford Corporation Tramways between Bury and Victoria was opened.

== Closure ==
Abandonment of the tram services started as early as 3 July 1932, when the service between Rochdale to Bury via Heywood was withdrawn. However, the total closure of the service was delayed for several more years until on 13 February 1949, tram 13 operated the last service.
