= Elton High School =

The Elton High School

Location
- Walshaw Road; Bury, Greater Manchester, BL8 1RN; England; 53.6000°N 2.3284°W

Information
- Type: Community school
- Motto: Quality, Care, Integrity
- Religious affiliation: Mixed
- Established: 1954
- Local authority: Bury
- Department for Education URN: 105354 Tables
- Ofsted: Reports
- Chair of governors: Iain MacKay
- Head teacher: Jonathan Wilton
- Staff: 70
- Gender: Coeducational
- Age: 11 to 16
- Enrolment: 1,030 pupils
- Colours: Grey and red
- Website: www.eltonhigh.bury.sch.uk

The Elton High School is a mixed secondary school located on Walshaw Road to the north-west of Bury town centre in Greater Manchester, England.

The Elton High School was recognised as "Good" school with "Outstanding" features by Ofsted following inspection in 2009. The English Department was inspected in November 2010 and it was found that the overall effectiveness of English within the school was "Outstanding". In February 2015, the school was graded "requires improvement" in all areas. The school was most recently graded "Good" following an Ofsted inspection in January 2017.

The original school building was opened in 1954. Construction of a new building on the same site began in summer 2015; it opened to pupils in September 2016. It was constructed as part of a nationwide plan to replace the schools in poorest condition.

== Notable former pupils ==
- Georgia May Foote, actor who played Katy Armstrong in Coronation Street
- Steve Kirby, former Marylebone Cricket Club Head Coach
- Gary Neville, Sky Sports football pundit, retired England international football player, former Manchester United captain and co-owner of Salford City
- Phil Neville, retired England international football player, former Everton captain, co-owner of Salford City and ex coach of Inter Miami
- Tracey Neville, twin sister of Phil Neville, former England netball team coach
