= Bury, Greater Manchester =

Town in Greater Manchester, England

Coordinates: 53.593°N 2.298°W

Bury
- Town
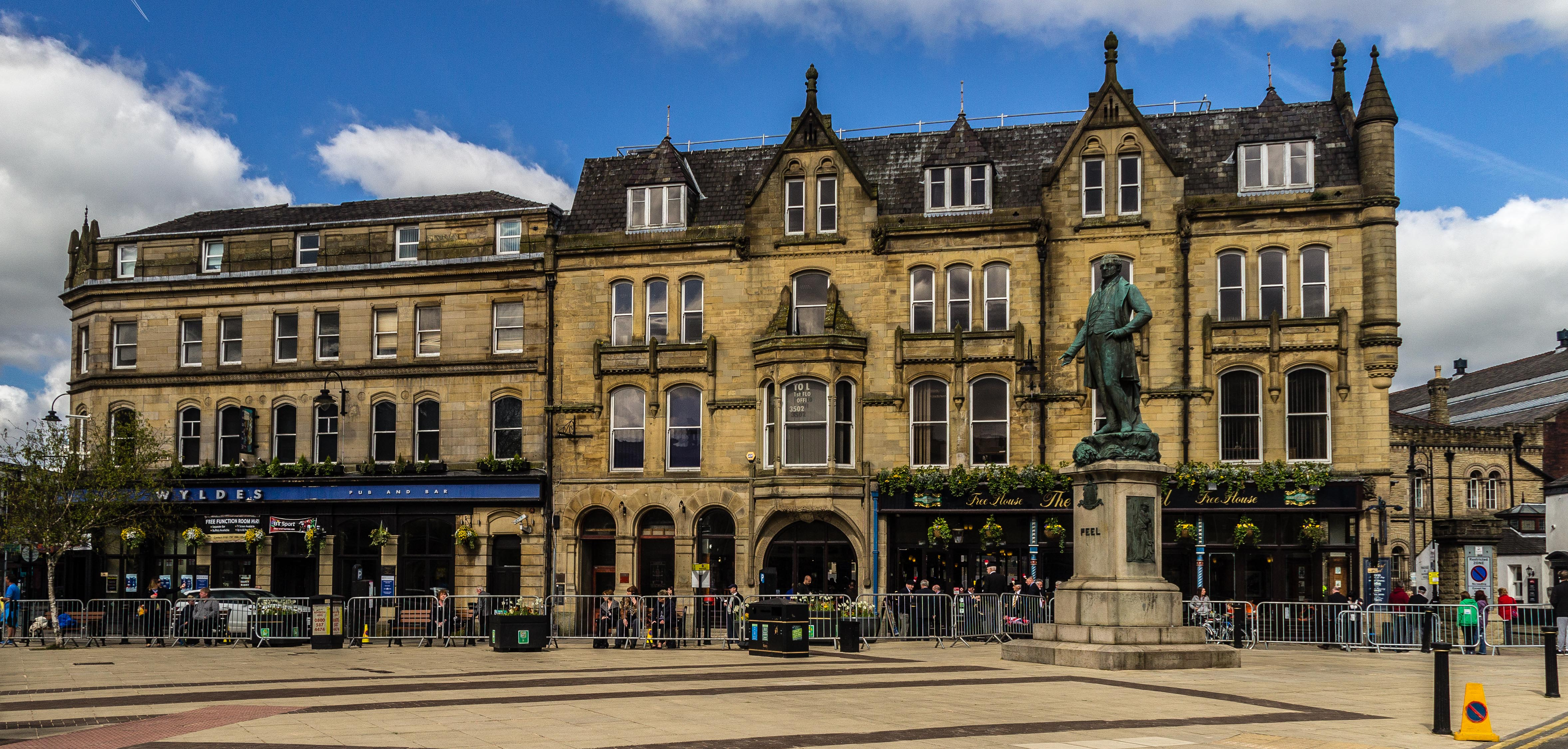
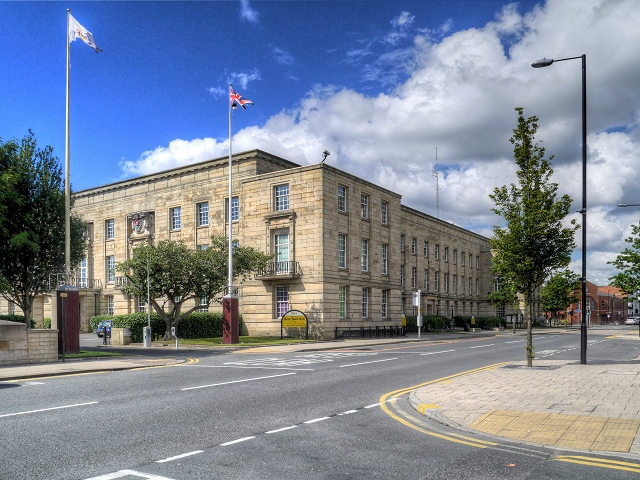
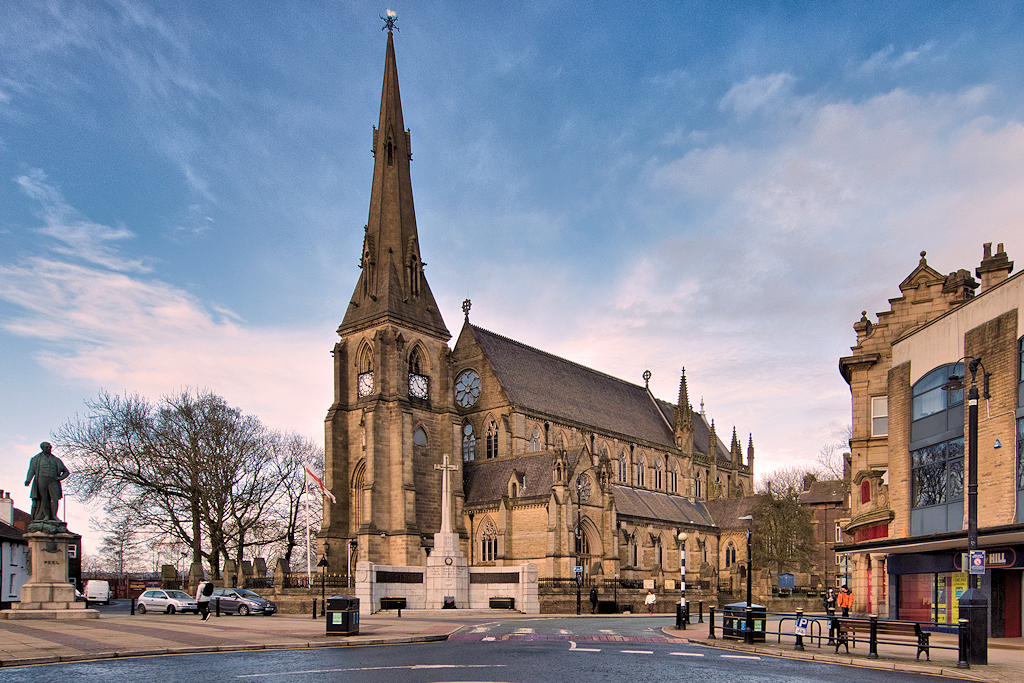
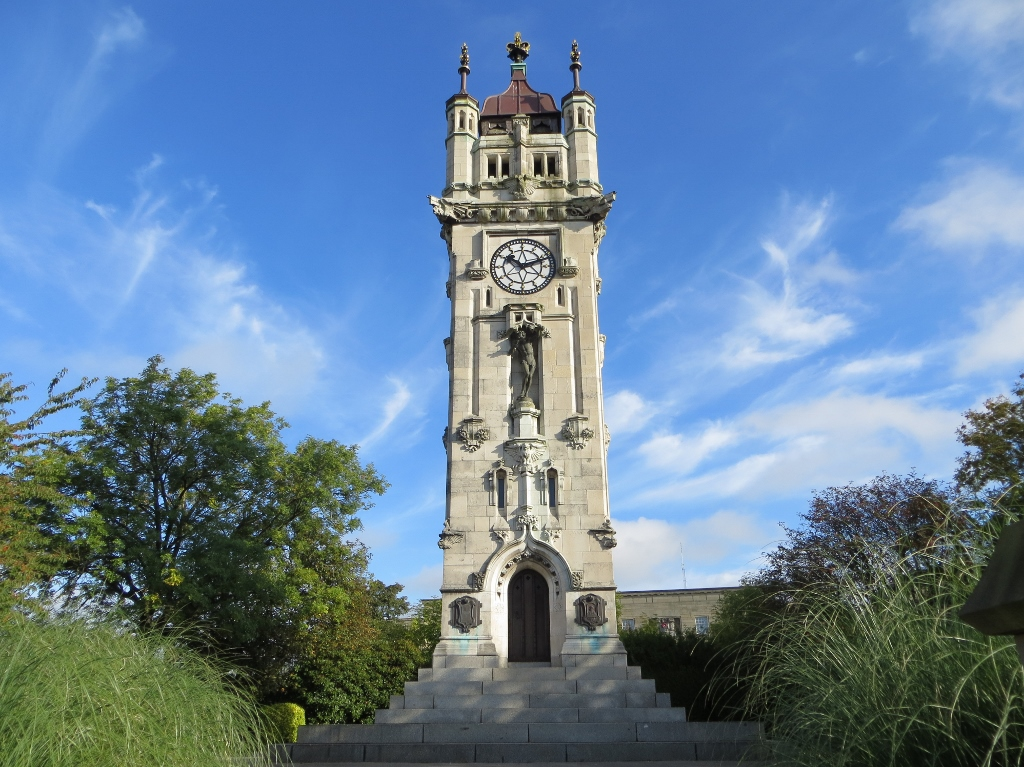
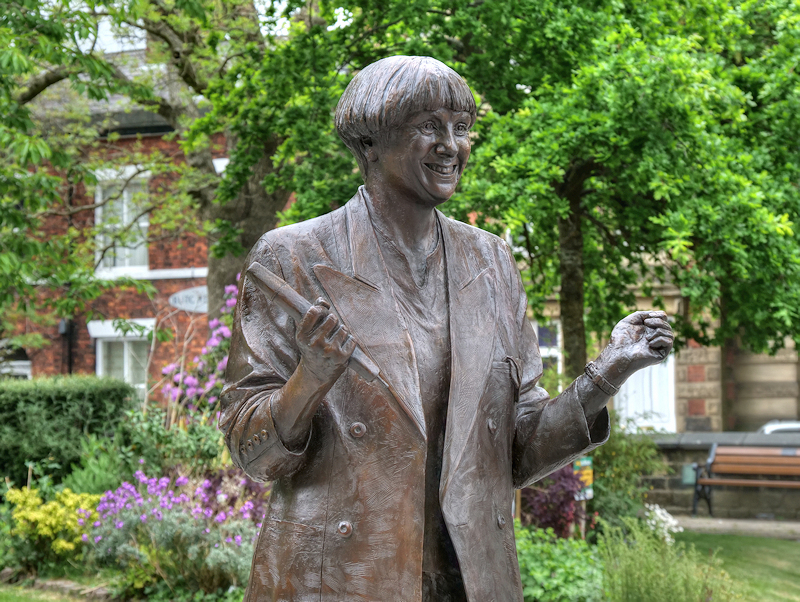
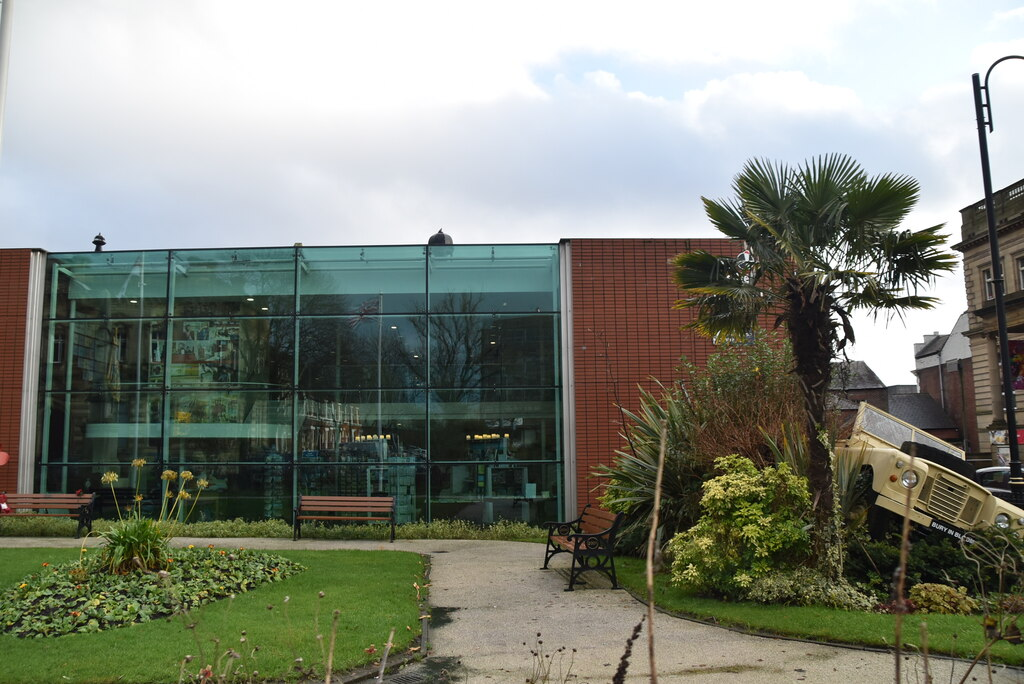
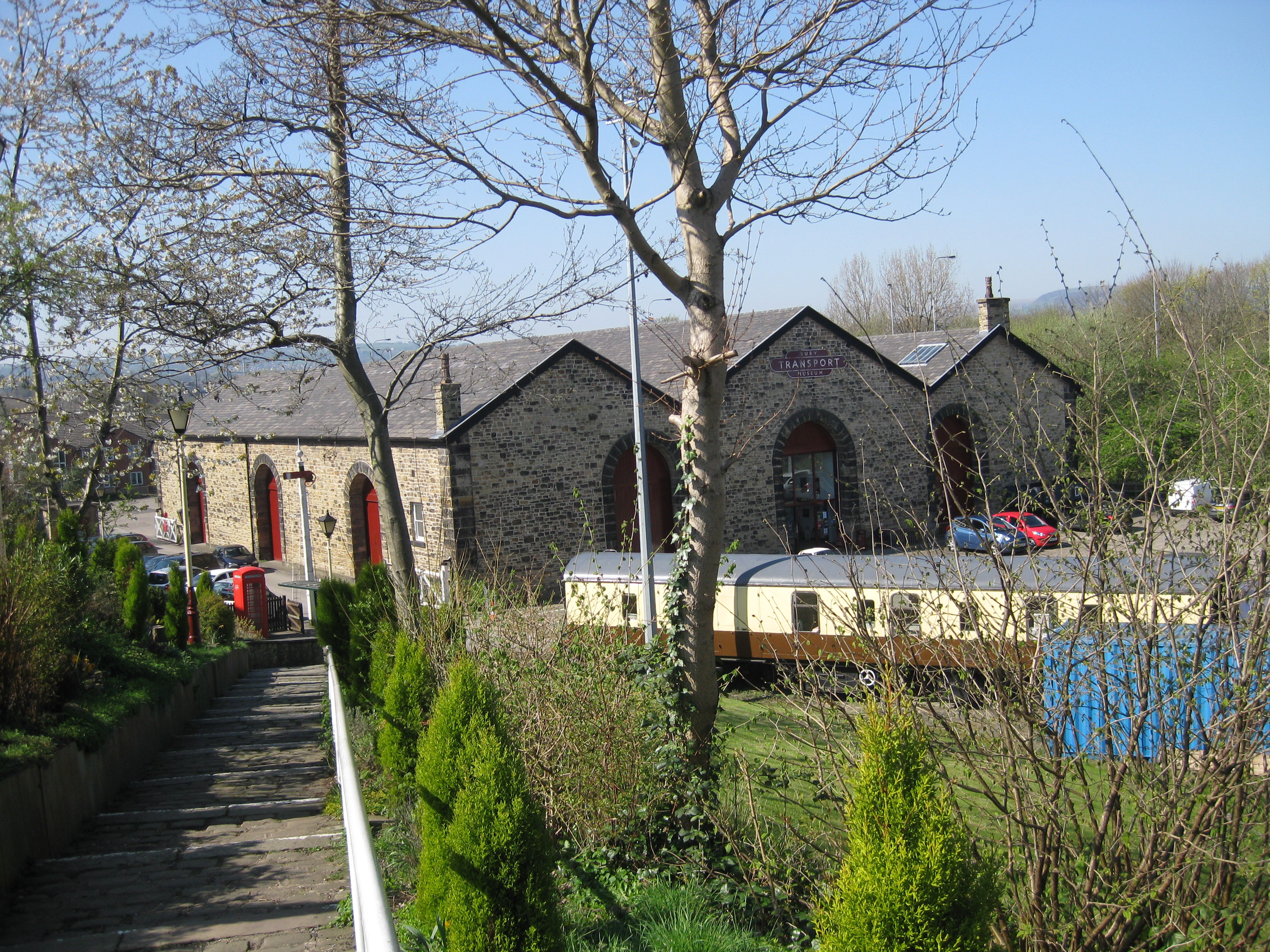
- Market Place Town Hall St Mary's Church Whitehead Clock Tower Victoria Wood statue Fusilier Museum Transport Museum

- Location within Greater Manchester
- Area: 11.61 sq mi (30.1 km^{2})
- Population: 81,101 (2021 Census)
  - Density: 6,985/sq mi (2,697/km^{2})
- OS grid reference: SD805105
  - London: 169 mi (272 km)
- Metropolitan borough: Bury
- Metropolitan county: Greater Manchester
- Region: North West
- Country: England
- Sovereign state: United Kingdom
- Areas of the town: List: Blackbridge; Chesham, Elton; Fairfield; Fernhill; Fishpool; Free Town; Higher Woodhill; Hollins; Jericho; Limefield; Nangreaves; Pimhole; Redvales; Starling; Tottington; Town centre; Walmersley; Walshaw; Woolfold
- Post town: BURY
- Postcode district: BL0, BL8, BL9
- Dialling code: 0161
- Police: Greater Manchester
- Fire: Greater Manchester
- Ambulance: North West
- UK Parliament: Bury North
- Website: bury.gov.uk

Bury (/ˈbɛri/, /ˈbʊri/) is a market town in the Metropolitan Borough of Bury, Greater Manchester, England. It lies on the river Irwell, 5 miles (8 km) east of Bolton, 6 miles (9.7 km) south-west of Rochdale and 8 miles (12.9 km) north-west of Manchester. The town had a population of 81,101 in 2021, while the wider borough was 193,846.

The town is part of the historic county of Lancashire, and has been a part of the metropolitan county of Greater Manchester since 1974. Bury emerged in the Industrial Revolution as a mill town manufacturing textiles. The town is known for the open-air Bury Market and black pudding, the traditional local dish. Bury is home to the historic and successful football club Bury F.C. Former prime minister, Sir Robert Peel, was born here.

== History ==
=== Toponymy ===
The name Bury (also earlier known as Buri and Byri) comes from an Old English word, meaning castle, stronghold or fort, an early form of modern English borough (German burg).

=== Early history ===
Bury was formed around the ancient market place, but there is evidence of activity dating back to the period of Roman occupation. Bury Museum has a Roman urn containing a number of small bronze coins dated for AD 253–282 which was found north of what is now the town centre. Under Agricola, the road-building programme included a route from the fort at Manchester (Mamucium) to the fort at Ribchester (Bremetennacum) which ran through Radcliffe and Affetside. The modern Watling Street, which serves the Seddons Farm estate on the west side of town, follows the approximate line of the Roman road.

The most imposing building in the late medieval town would have been Bury Castle. Originally built as a timber framed moated manor house in the late 14th century, it was later rebuilt in stone and fortified, following the granting of a licence to crenellate to Sir Thomas Pilkington in 1469. It sat in a good defensive position on high ground overlooking the Irwell Valley. The Pilkington family suffered badly in the Wars of the Roses when, despite geography, they supported the House of York. When Richard III was killed at the Battle of Bosworth in 1485, Thomas Pilkington was captured and later executed. The outcome of the battle was the Lancastrian Duke of Richmond being crowned Henry VII by Sir William Stanley. As a reward for the support of his family, Thomas Stanley was created Earl of Derby and, amongst other lands, the confiscated Pilkington estate in Bury was presented to him.

The ancestral home of the Earls of Derby is Knowsley Hall on the outskirts of Liverpool. The family maintains a connection with Bury in various ways; Derby High School is named after them. When the school opened in 1959 the 18th Earl of Derby was patron and the school's badge is based on the Earl's coat of arms. The 15th and 16th earls were both supporters of Bury Grammar School, both financially and in terms of land, and one of the school houses is named Derby in their honour. The town is home to the Derby Hall and formerly also the Derby Hotel, opened in February 1850.

The castle remains were buried beneath the streets outside the Castle Armoury until properly excavated for the first time in the 1970s.

Between 1801 and 1830, the population of the town more than doubled from 7,072 to 15,086. This was the time when the factories, mines and foundries, with their spinning machines and steam engines, began to dominate the landscape. In 1822, Bury Savings Bank was opened on Silver Street, which was established under government control and later became Trustee Savings Bank.

=== Industrial Revolution ===
Probate evidence from the 17th century and the remains of 18th-century weavers' cottages in Elton, on the west side of Bury, indicate that domestic textile production was an important factor in the local economy at a time when Bury's textile industry was dominated by woollens, and based upon the domestic production of yarn and cloth, as well as water-powered fulling mills.

Development was swift in the late 18th and early 19th centuries. The establishment in 1773 by the family of Sir Robert Peel of Brooksbottom Mill in Summerseat, north of the town, as a calico printing works marked the beginning of the cotton industry in Bury. By the early 19th century, cotton was the predominant textile industry, with the rivers Roch and Irwell providing power for spinning mills and processing water for the finishing trades. Development was further promoted when the town was linked to the national canal network by the Manchester, Bolton & Bury Canal, fully opened in 1808. The canal was provided with water from Elton Reservoir, fed by aqueducts from a weir on the Irwell, north of what is now the Burrs Country Park. The Burrs is also the site of another mill developed by the Peel family, first founded in 1790. The remains are displayed for the public. There were seven cotton mills in Bury by 1818 and the population grew from 9,152 in 1801, to 20,710 in 1841, and then to 58,029 in 1901.

Following this, railways were opened, linking the town from Bury Bolton Street to Manchester, via Prestwich and Radcliffe, to Rawtenstall and to Accrington. From Knowsley Street, there were connections to the neighbouring mill towns of Bolton, Heywood and Rochdale. As well as the many cotton mills, other industries which thrived included paper-making, calico printing and some light engineering. The town expanded to incorporate the former townships of Elton, Walmersley and Heap, and rows of terraced houses encircled the town centre by the turn of the 19th century. Districts such as Freetown, Fishpool and Pimhole were transformed from farmers' fields to rows of terraces beside the factories and mills.

The houses were of the most limited kind, without basic facilities, sewers or proper streets. The result was the rapid spread of disease and high mortality rates in crowded areas. In 1838, out of 1,058 working class houses in Bury investigated by the Manchester Statistical Society, 733 had 3–4 people in each bed, 207 had 4–5, and 76 had 5–6. Social reformers locally and nationally were concerned about such issues, including Edwin Chadwick. One report that prepared the ground for the reform of public health matters, commissioned by the prime minister Sir Robert Peel, asked local doctors for information. King Street was highlighted: it had 10 houses, each with one bedroom, and a population of 69. The average life expectancy in Bury was 13.8 years. Towns like Bury were likened to 'camps' where newcomers sought work in mill, mine or forge. Many, often from Ireland, found shelter in lodging houses. Thirty-eight in Bury were surveyed: 73% had men and women sharing beds indiscriminately, 81% were filthy and the average was 5.5 persons to a bed.

Although Bury had few of the classic late-19th-century spinning mills that were such a feature of other Lancashire towns, a group known as Peel Mills are still in use at Castlecroft Road. (Note: The mills lie immediately north of the town centre.) Their name is another reminder of the link with the Peel family.

=== Lancashire Fusiliers ===
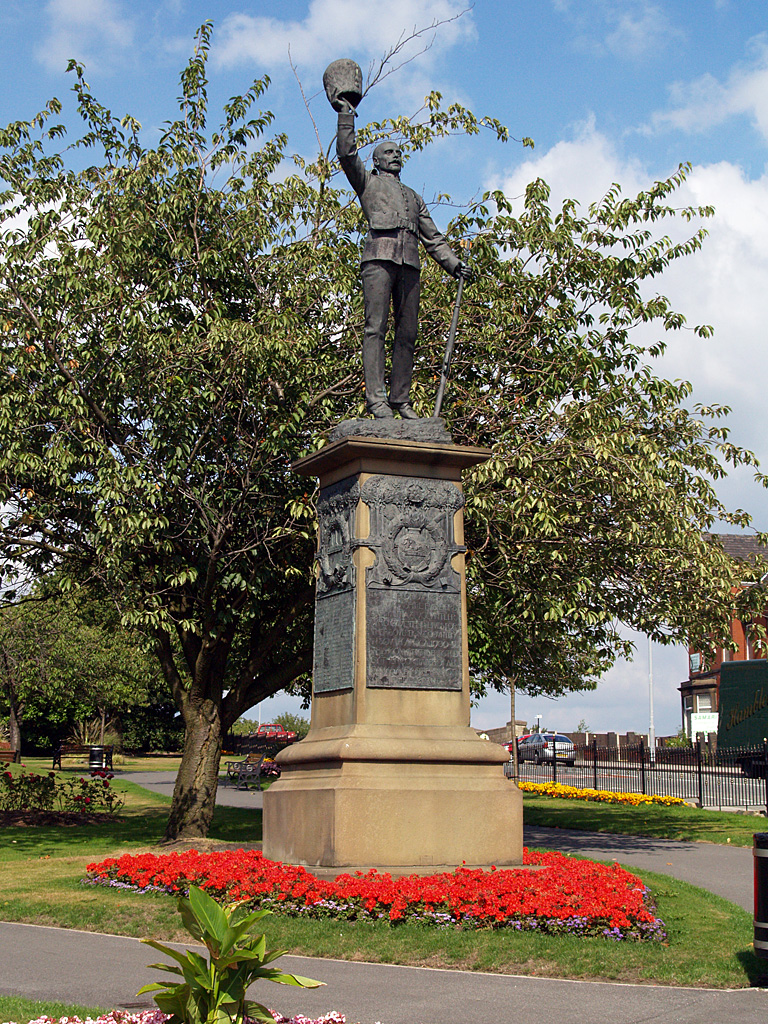
Lancashire Fusiliers' War Memorial at Whitehead Gardens

According to writer Geoffrey Moorhouse, no history of Bury is complete without reference to its role as the regimental town of the Lancashire Fusiliers.

In 1688, Prince William of Orange (later King William III) landed at Brixham, Devon. He asked Colonel Sir Robert Peyton to raise a regiment containing six independent companies in the Exeter area. This regiment absorbed the previously enscripted men housed at the Wellington Barracks, who would have been any men over the age of 21. These men became the Lancashire Fusiliers once they joined William's of Orange Men. Following successful recruitment, a regimental depot was established at Wellington Barracks in 1881. This barracks were built originally as a response to the Chartist movement, who were a mass movement of working-class men who protested via petition signatures.

The People's Charter called for six reforms to make the political system more democratic:

1. A vote for every man aged twenty-one years and above, of sound mind, and not undergoing punishment for a crime.
2. The secret ballot to protect the elector in the exercise of his vote.
3. No property qualification for Members of Parliament to allow the constituencies to return the man of their choice.
4. Payment of Members, enabling tradesmen, working men, or other persons of modest means to leave or interrupt their livelihood to attend to the interests of the nation.
5. Equal constituencies, securing the same amount of representation for the same number of electors, instead of allowing less populous constituencies to have as much or more weight than larger ones.
6. Annual Parliamentary elections, thus presenting the most effectual check to bribery and intimidation, since no purse could buy a constituency under a system of universal manhood suffrage in every twelve months.

Chartists saw themselves fighting against political corruption and for democracy in an industrial society, but attracted support beyond the radical political groups for economic reasons, such as opposing wage cuts and unemployment.

=== Recent history ===
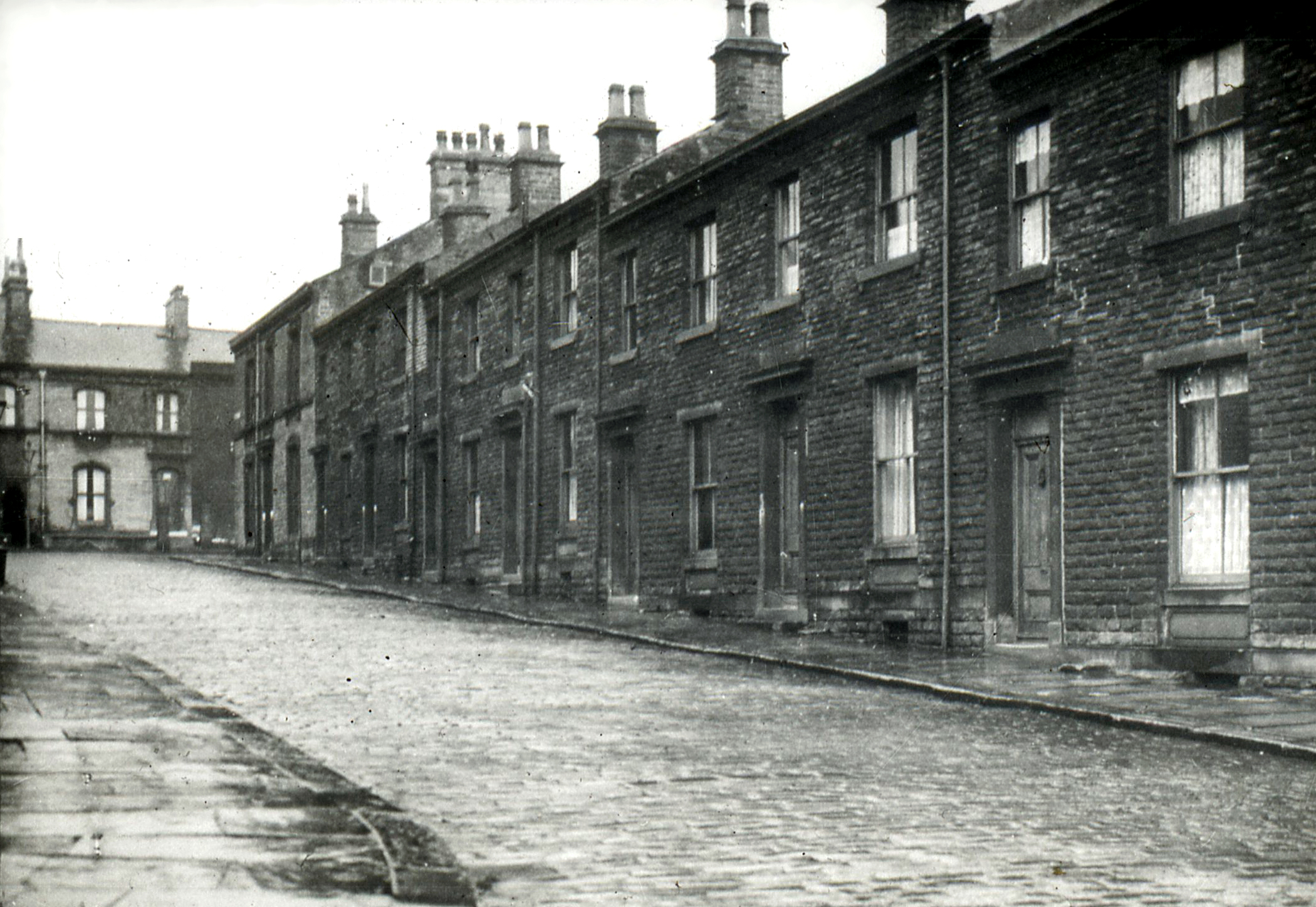
Terraced housing in Bury (1958)

The post-war period saw a major decline in the cotton industry and, as with many neighbouring towns, Bury's skyline was soon very different, with countless factory chimneys being pulled down and the associated mills closing their doors permanently. The old shopping area around Princess Street and Union Square was demolished in the late 1960s, and a concrete precinct was built to replace it. This development was replaced by the Mill Gate Shopping Centre in 1995.

On 23 November 1981, an F0/T1 tornado formed over Whitefield and subsequently moved through Bury town centre and surrounding areas.

In 2010, a £350 million shopping development opened up around the Rock. The main street is populated mainly by independent shops and food outlets. At the top end of the street is a shopping area with a multi-screen cinema, bowling alley and department stores including Marks & Spencer, Primark, H&M, Clarks and The Range.

Bury also benefited from other amenities in the early 2010s, including a new medical centre and office accommodation close to Bury Town Hall. A decision by Marks & Spencer to vacate its store in the Mill Gate Shopping Centre and move into a new larger one on The Rock emphasised a change of clientele in the town.

The town centre is famous for its traditional market, with its "world famous" black pudding stalls. Bury Market was also once famous for its tripe, although this has declined in recent decades. The Bury Black Pudding Company, owned by the Chadwick family, provides black pudding to retailers such as Harrods and to major supermarkets. The market is a destination for people from all over Greater Manchester and beyond.

The last 30 years have seen the town develop into an important commuter town for neighbouring Manchester. Large-scale housing development has taken place around Unsworth, Redvales, Sunny Bank, Brandlesholme, Limefield, Chesham and Elton. The old railway line to Manchester Victoria closed in 1990 and was replaced by the light rapid transit system Metrolink in 1992. The town was also linked to the motorway network in 1978 with the opening of the M66, which is accessed from the east side of the town.

== Governance ==
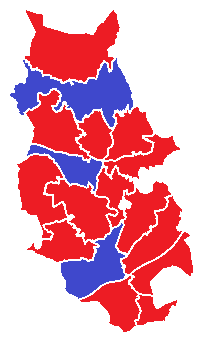
The highest-polling party in each ward in the 2011 United Kingdom local elections

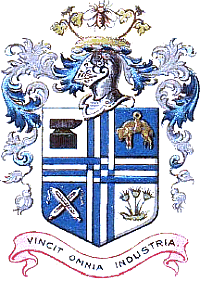
Arms of the former Bury County Borough Council (abolished 1974)

The town was initially a parish in the Hundred of Salford, containing the townships of Heap, Elton, Walmersley with Shuttleworth, Tottington Higher End and Lower End, Musbury, and Cowpe with Lench; the latter two being in the Hundred of Blackburn. From the 18th century, it was seen over by a select vestry with a "board of guardians for the poor". Improvement commissioners were added before the borough charter was granted in 1876. In 1889, the town's status was raised to that of a county borough of Lancashire.

The coat of arms was granted in 1877 and its symbols represent local industry. In the quarters are representations of the anvil (for forging), the golden fleece (the wool industry), a pair of crossed shuttles (the cotton industry) and a papyrus plant (the paper industry). Above them are a closed visor capped by a mayfly and two red roses. The Latin motto, "Vincit Omnia Industria", translates as "work conquers all".

With the passage of the Local Government Act 1972, Bury merged with the neighbouring municipal boroughs of Radcliffe and Prestwich, together with the urban districts of Whitefield, Tottington and Ramsbottom in 1974 to become the Metropolitan Borough of Bury. The borough is part of the metropolitan county of Greater Manchester.

On 3 July 2008, a referendum was held in the borough to decide whether it should be ruled by a directly elected mayor. The proposal was rejected by the voters.

== Geography ==
Bury

Climate chart (precipitation, max. and min. temperature)
J	F	M	A	M	J	J	A	S	O	N	D
70 8 2	70 8 2	50 10 3	63 13 5	51 16 8	58 19 10	54 21 12	68 21 12	63 18 10	88 14 8	82 10 4	78 7 2
- █ Average max. and min. temperatures in °C
- █ Precipitation totals in mm
Imperial conversion
J	F	M	A	M	J	J	A	S	O	N	D
2.8 46 36	2.8 46 36	2 50 37	2.5 55 41	2 61 46	2.3 66 50	2.1 70 54	2.7 70 54	2.5 64 50	3.5 57 46	3.2 50 39	3.1 45 36
- █ Average max. and min. temperatures in °F
- █ Precipitation totals in inches

Bury is located on the edge of the western Pennines in North West England, in the northern part of the Greater Manchester Urban Area. Its position on the river Irwell has proved important in its history and development. Flowing from north to south, the river divides the town into two parts on the east and west sides of the valley, respectively. The town centre sits close to, and above, the river on the east side. Bury Bridge is a key bridging point, linking the east side of town and the town centre with the western suburbs and Bolton beyond.

Other bridges across the river are few—there is one at Radcliffe Road to the south and one at Summerseat to the north. There is a bridge at the Burrs, but it serves a cul-de-sac and does not allow full east–west access. To the south, the main tributary (the river Roch, flowing from the east) joins the Irwell close to another significant bridging point, Blackford Bridge. This carries the main A56 road south towards Manchester. Industrialisation of the area in the past dramatically reduced the fauna present in the river, as sewage continues to pollute it today; the Irwell is considered one of the most polluted rivers in the UK.

Bury experiences a warm temperate climate with warm summers and cool winters owing to the shielding effect of the Western Pennine Moors. Summer is the driest time of the year with low rainfall. Bury rarely experiences temperatures over 30 °C (86 °F), due to oceanic north-easterly winds. In summer, the temperature is warm and Bury experiences much sun. Winters are cool; temperatures can drop below freezing between December and March. There is little extreme weather in Bury; floods are rare since the town is on higher ground, although flood is occasionally seen in Ramsbottom. Early summer thunderstorms can bring high rainfall.

For purposes of the Office for National Statistics, Bury is part of the Greater Manchester Urban Area.

== Demography ==
At the 2001 census, the town of Bury had a total population of 77,211, whereas that of the wider Metropolitan Borough was 183,200.

Population growth of Bury
Year	1801	1811	1821	1831	1839	1851	1881	1891	1901	1911	1921	1931	1951	1961
Population	19,915	24,986	30,655	42,305	55,577	63,803	39,238	41,038	58,029	58,648	56,403	56,182	58,838	60,149

== Landmarks ==
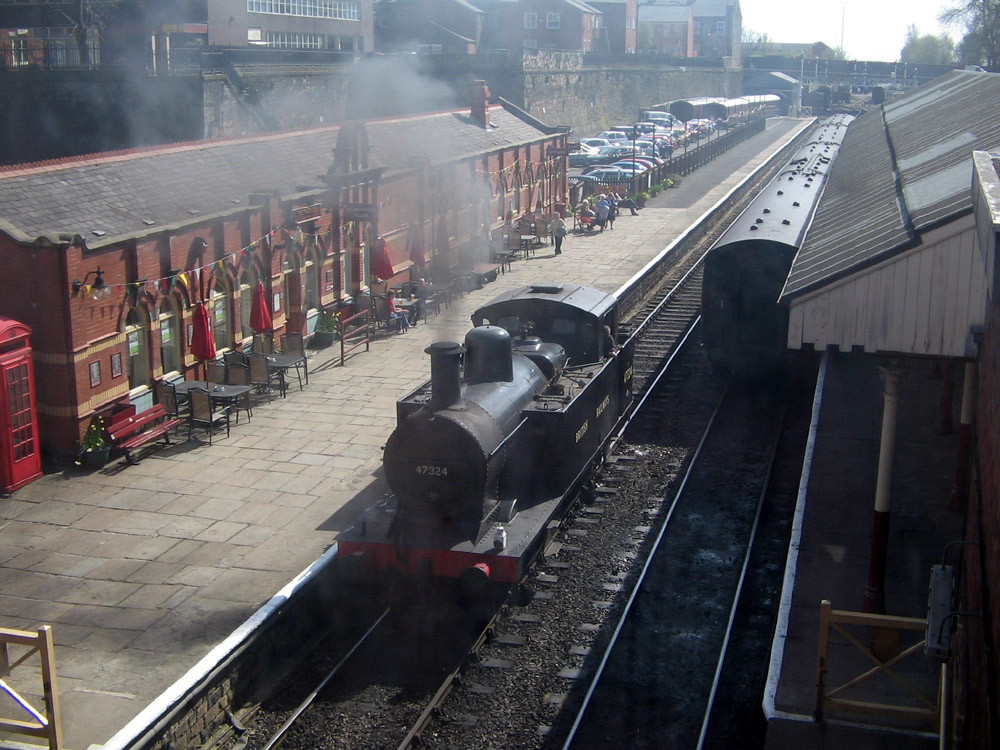
Bury Bolton Street station on the preserved East Lancashire Railway

Attractions in Bury include:

- Bury Art Museum, containing the Wrigley collection of paintings, which includes works by J.M.W. Turner, Edwin Henry Landseer, John Constable and Peter De Wint. The building, by Woodhouse and Willoughby in 1899, was described by Pevsner as "probably the best building in Bury".
- Bury Castle is a fortified manor house built in the mid-13th century by Sir Thomas Pilkington and is now protected as a scheduled monument; the foundations have been excavated and have been open to the public since 2000.
- Bury Parish Church, on the Market Place in the centre of the town, is a Grade I listed building.
- Bury Market has been in operation for nearly 600 years; the original licence for a market was granted in 1444. In 2006, of 1,150 markets in the UK, Bury's was voted the best 'British Market of the Year' by the National Association of British Market Authorities. It was also selected as BBC Radio 4's Food and Farming Awards' Market of the Year in 2008. It receives over 1,000 coachloads of visitors every year.
- Castlesteads is an ancient promontory fort and scheduled monument.
- Peel Tower, Harcles Hill, above Holcombe village, Ramsbottom. The tower was built in remembrance of Sir Robert Peel. Hundreds of people climb to the tower each year on Good Friday. Historically this gathering had a principally religious purpose, since the hill was said to be strikingly similar to the hill that Jesus climbed (Calvary) before his crucifixion.

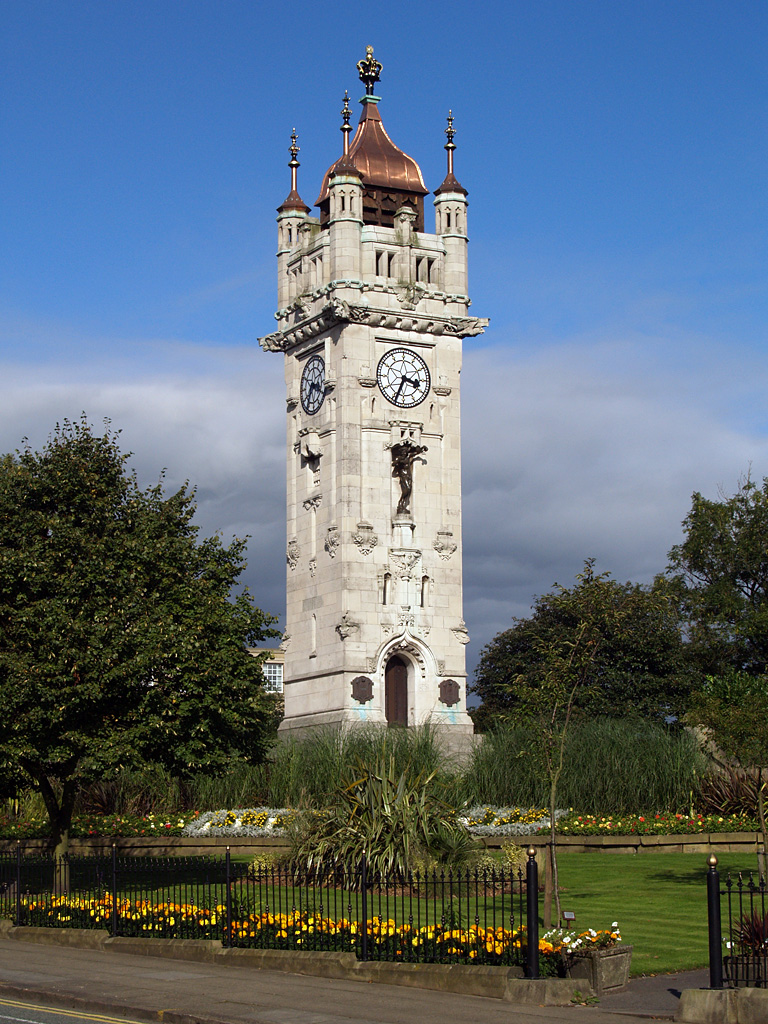
Whitehead Clock Tower

- Whitehead Clock Tower stands in Whitehead Garden, separated from the Town Hall by a railway cutting. It was erected in 1913 as a memorial to Walter Whitehead, a surgeon of international repute who was born in the town
- East Lancashire Railway, a heritage railway which runs from the town to Heywood, Ramsbottom and Rawtenstall; it is based at Bolton Street station
- The regimental Fusilier Museum of the Lancashire Fusiliers on Moss Street
- Manchester Road, Silver Street and their environs contain many examples of Late Georgian brick terrace and York stone housing.

Bury is home to several fine sculptures and pieces of public art:

- Edward Hodges Baily's 1851 statue of Sir Robert Peel stands in the centre of town,
- Lutyens' Lancashire Fusiliers War Memorial can be found outside the Fusilier Museum.
- George Frampton's 'cheering fusilier', a tribute to those who died in the Boer War, stands in Whitehead Garden near the town hall
- The Kay Monument, a solid pavilion with a stone dome capped with a bronze Fame, commemorates John Kay, the inventor of the flying shuttle which revolutionised the weaving industry. Designed by William Venn Gough in 1908, it holds a number of sculpted bronze plaques by John Cassidy
- Contemporary works include Ron Silliman's text piece From Northern Soul (Bury Neon) at Bury Interchange.

== Education ==
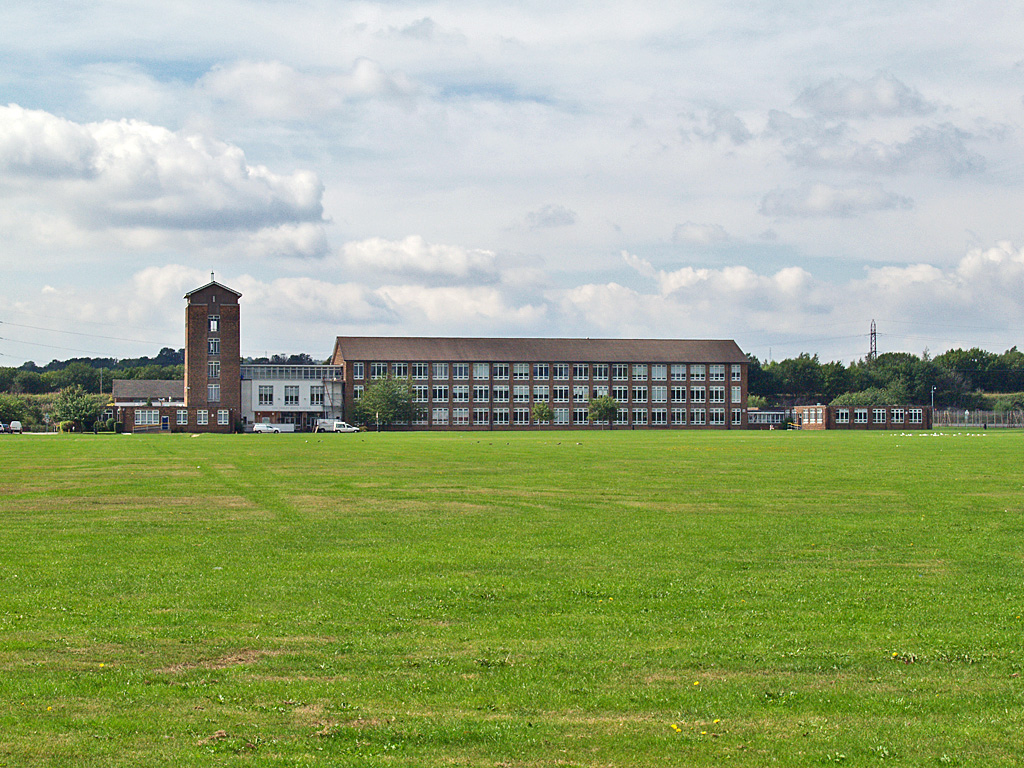
Derby High School is one of Bury's comprehensive schools; it was opened in 1959 and its patron is the Earl of Derby

Colleges

- Bury College, formed from a merger of Bury Technical College, Peel Sixth Form College and Stand Sixth Form College
- Holy Cross College, formerly Bury Convent Grammar School. In 2008, it was named the second-best college in the country, in relation to students' academic performance.

High schools

- Bury Church of England High School
- Bury Grammar School was founded in 1570
- Bury Grammar School (Girls), formerly Bury Girls' High School, opened in 1884.
- Derby High School
- Elton High School
- Hazel Wood High School
- St Gabriel's RC High School
- Tottington High School
- Woodhey High School.

== Transport ==
=== Buses ===
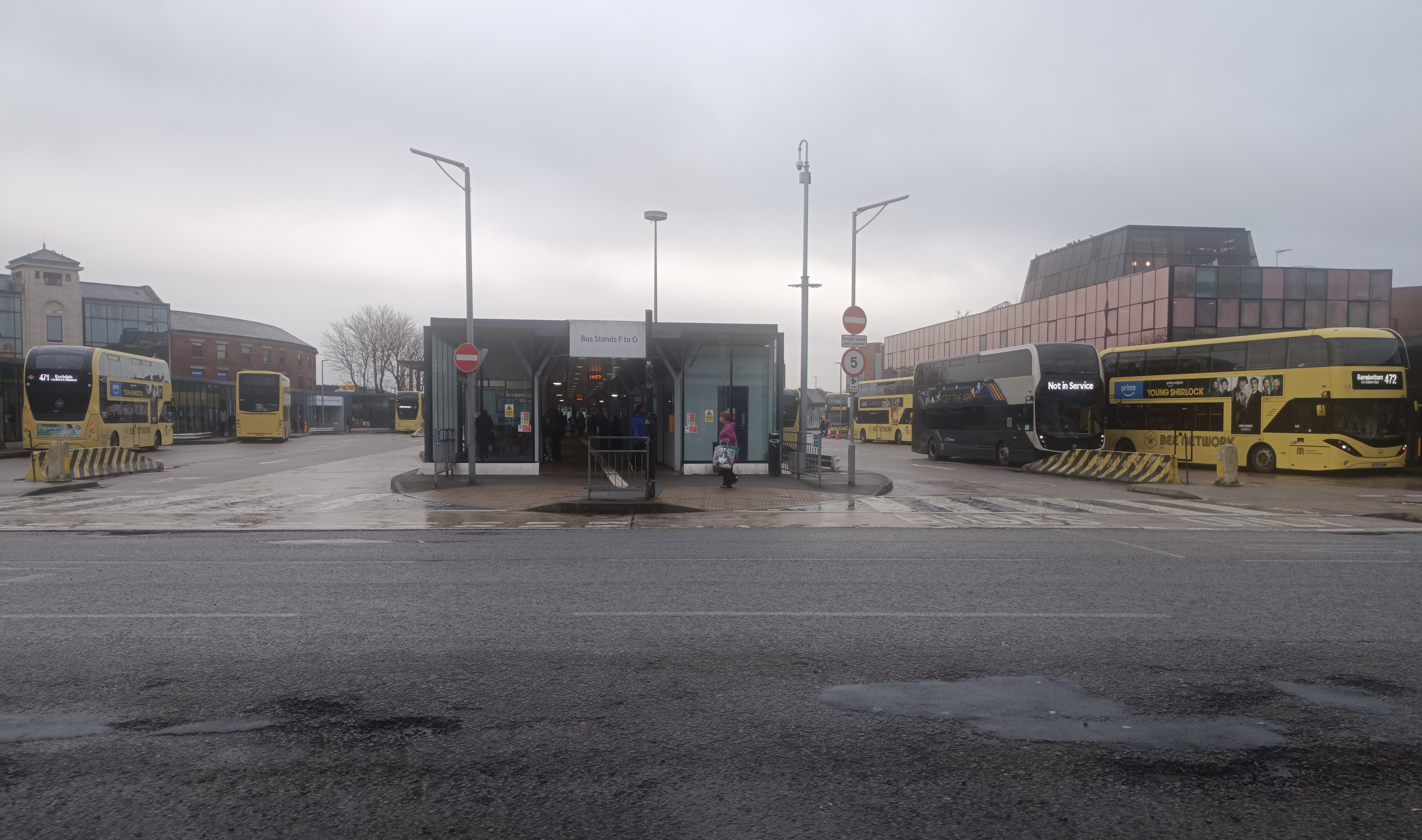
Bee Network-liveried buses at Bury Interchange (2026)

Bee Network bus services are operated by Diamond North West, Go North West, First Greater Manchester and Stagecoach Manchester, under contract to Transport for Greater Manchester. Routes connect the town with Manchester, Bolton, Rochdale, Ramsbottom, Tottington, Nangreaves, Farnworth, Norden, Heywood and Pendleton. The Burnley Bus Company operates a route to Rossendale, Blackburn and Burnley.

There are plans to demolish and rebuild the interchange, starting in 2027; it will be the first in Greater Manchester to be carbon neutral.

=== Metrolink trams ===
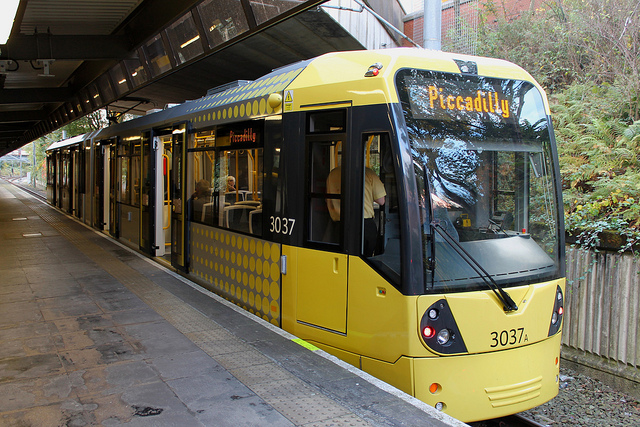
A Bombardier M5000 tram at Bury Interchange

Manchester Metrolink operates trams on the Green and Yellow lines to Altrincham and Piccadilly respectively. There is generally a service every six minutes to Manchester city centre, with every other tram continuing to Altrincham.

There are plans to extend the Metrolink line to connect with Rochdale, via the East Lancashire Railway through Heywood, as well as a new station near Elton Reservoir to accommodate upcoming housing developments.

=== Historical transport ===
==== Tramways ====
Between 1903 and 1949, the Bury Corporation Tramways network served the town. The network connected the town with electric trams to Tottington, Radcliffe, Whitefield, Unsworth, Heywood, Walmersley, Breightmet and the neighbouring Rochdale Corporation Tramways.

==== Railway ====
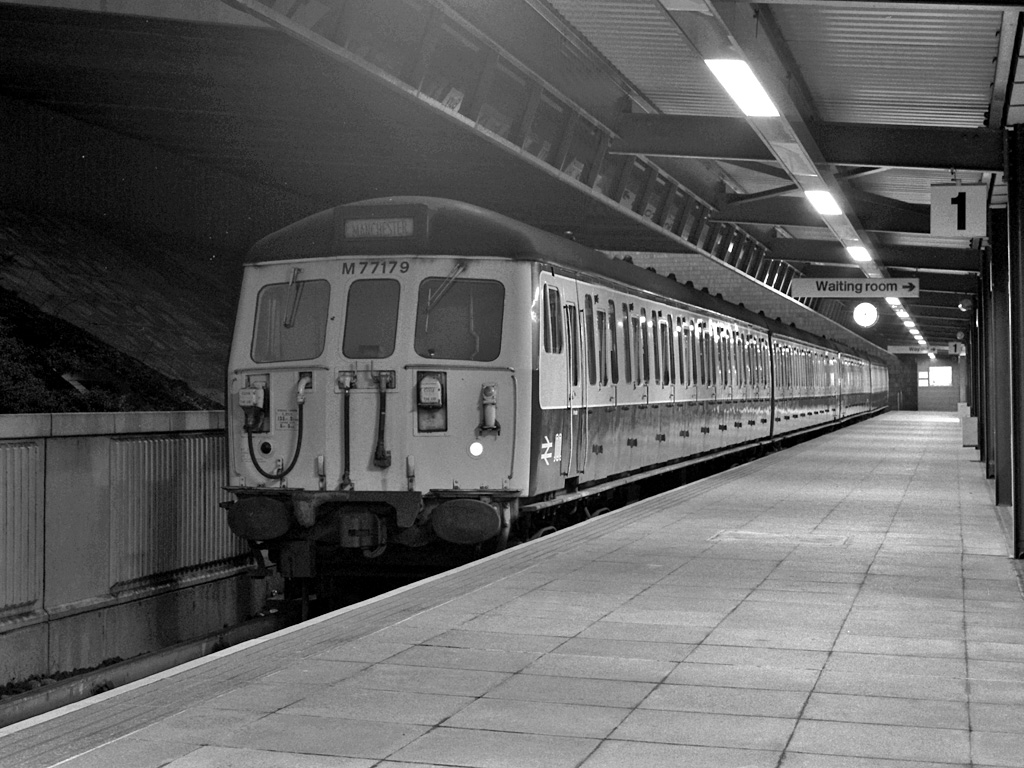
A Class 504 unit at Bury Interchange station

Bury Bolton Street railway station was opened in 1846, providing services to:

- Accrington and Bacup, via Ramsbottom and Rawtenstall to the north
- Holcombe Brook via Tottington on the branch line to the north-west
- Manchester Victoria, via Radcliffe, Whitefield and Prestwich, to the south.

The lines to the north were closed to passengers between 1952 and 1970, when only services to and from Manchester remained, provided by Class 504 electric multiple units. Services transferred to the new Bury Interchange in March 1980. The Bury Line was converted to the light rail Manchester Metrolink network in April 1992.

Bury was also served by Knowsley Street until its closure in 1970, which hosted passenger services travelling east–west through the town to Bolton and Heywood.

Bolton Street station is now operational on the heritage East Lancashire Railway; its line connects Heywood, Ramsbottom and Rawtenstall.

== Culture ==
=== Museums and galleries ===
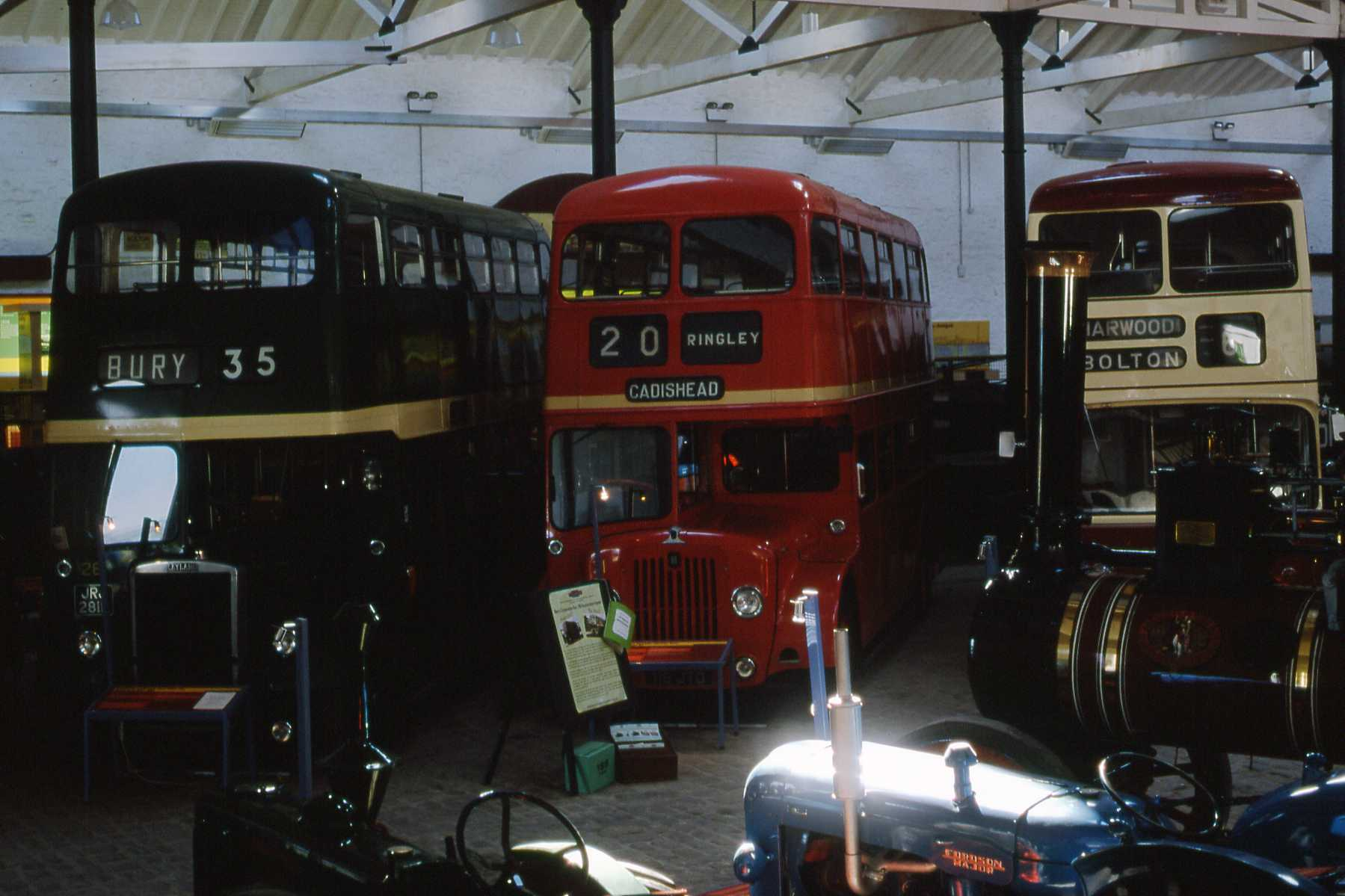
Heritage buses in Bury Transport Museum

The Bury Transport Museum, part of the East Lancashire Railway, holds a collection of vintage vehicles and interactive displays. It is housed in the restored and Grade II-listed 1848 Castlecroft Goods Shed.

Bury Art Museum is home to a fine collection of Victorian and 20th-century art, including works by Turner, Constable and Landseer.

The Fusilier Museum, home to the collection of the Lancashire Fusiliers, commemorates over three hundred years of the regiment's history. The museum occupies the former School of Arts and Crafts on Broad Street.

=== Music ===
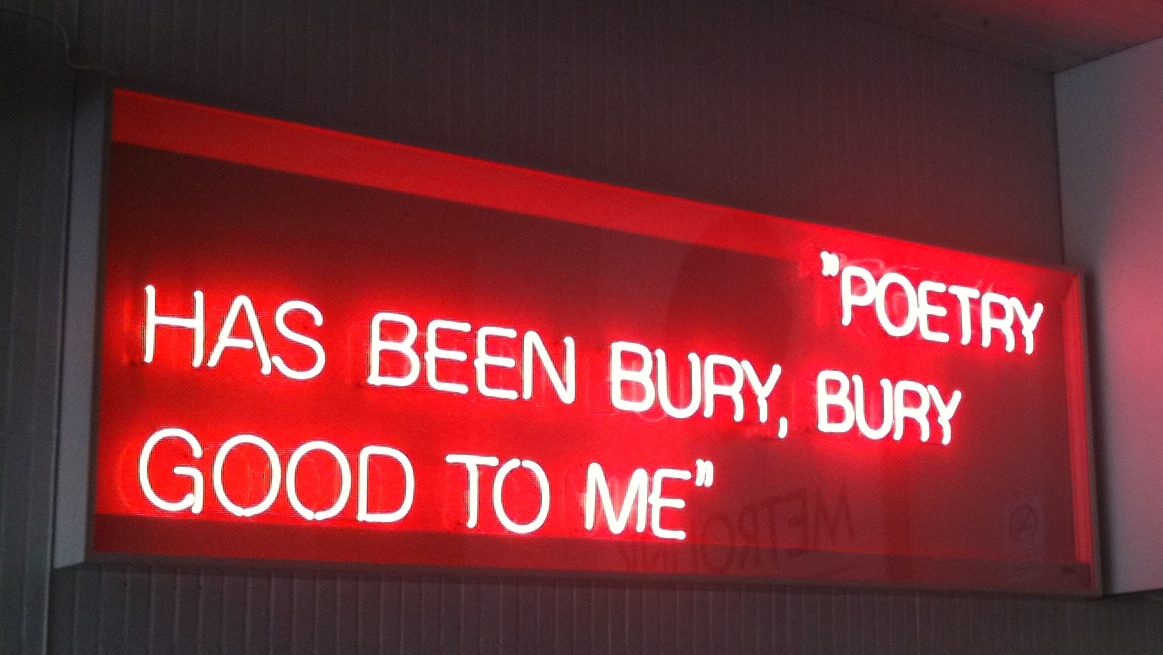
Ron Silliman's neon piece From Northern Soul (Bury Neon) on display at Bury Interchange, featured at the first Bury Light Night event

The 2008 Mercury Music Prize-winning group Elbow, fronted by Guy Garvey, hails from Bury. In 2009, the group was awarded the Freedom of the Borough after their 2008 album The Seldom Seen Kid won several accolades including a Brit Award and the Mercury Prize.

Bury hosts several music festivals yearly, including the Glaston-Bury Festival on the August bank holiday weekend, and Head for the Hills Festival (previously known as Ramsbottom Festival) closing the festival season in mid-September. While Glaston-Bury hosts mainly local/upcoming bands, Head for the Hills hosts a wider range of talent, including bands such as Soul II Soul, The Proclaimers and Maxïmo Park.

=== Performing arts ===
The Met arts centre, based in the Derby Hall on Market Street, is a small performing arts venue promoting a programme of theatre, music and comedy events. It has hosted famous comedy acts such as Peter Kay, Jason Manford, Steve Coogan and Eddie Izzard, in their days before fame.

=== Events ===
Inspired by the Nuit Blanche in Paris, Bury Light Night ran from 2011 to 2015. The event featured the streets of the town centre lit up with light installations and colourful projections, as well as performances and workshops at the Met, Rock, Kay Gardens, Art Museum and Bury Castle, amongst others. It cancelled after the 2015 event, due to a mixed reception.

=== Food ===
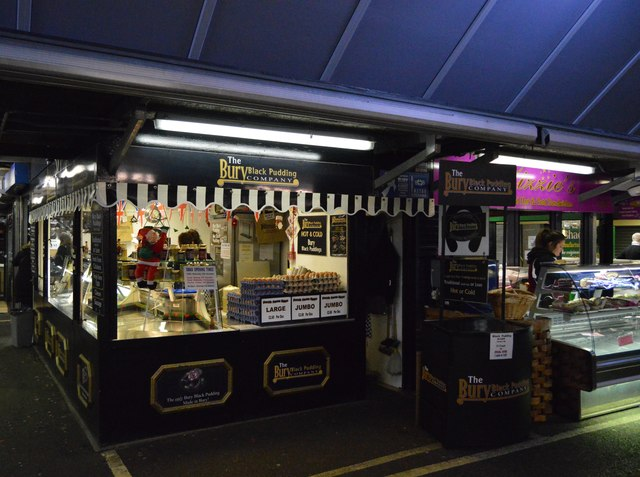
The Bury Black Pudding stall in the market

Bury is known for its black puddings so much so, that it is not uncommon to see it marketed as Bury Black Pudding on a menu. Simnel cake is a variant of the cake originating in Bury. The town was also notable for tripe, though there is little demand for this in modern times.

== Media ==
Local news and television programmes are provided by BBC North West and ITV Granada. Television signals are received from the Winter Hill TV transmitter.

Bury is served by several local radio stations:

- BBC Radio Manchester
- Heart North West
- Smooth North West
- Greatest Hits Radio Bolton & Bury
- Capital Manchester and Lancashire
- Rochdale Valley, a community-based radio station which broadcast from its studios in Rochdale.

The Bury Times is the local newspaper, with regional publications Manchester Evening News and North West Enquirer.

== Sport ==
Bury F.C. is the town's local football club. Bury play in the Northern Premier League, the seventh tier of English football. Bury gained worldwide publicity in August 2019 when the club were expelled from the Football League due to unpaid debts and poor ownership. In 2019, the phoenix Club Bury AFC was created; it merged with BFCSS in May 2023, returning to their former name a month later. The nickname for the club, the Shakers, has become a demonym for the residents of Bury.

The Lancashire Spinners are a basketball team based in Bury. It has competed in the second-tier English Basketball League Division 1 since 2015. The club have close ties with nearby Myerscough College.

Bury Broncos are a rugby league team based in the Prestwich area. Formed in 2008, it plays in the North West Men's League Division 1.

== Notable people ==
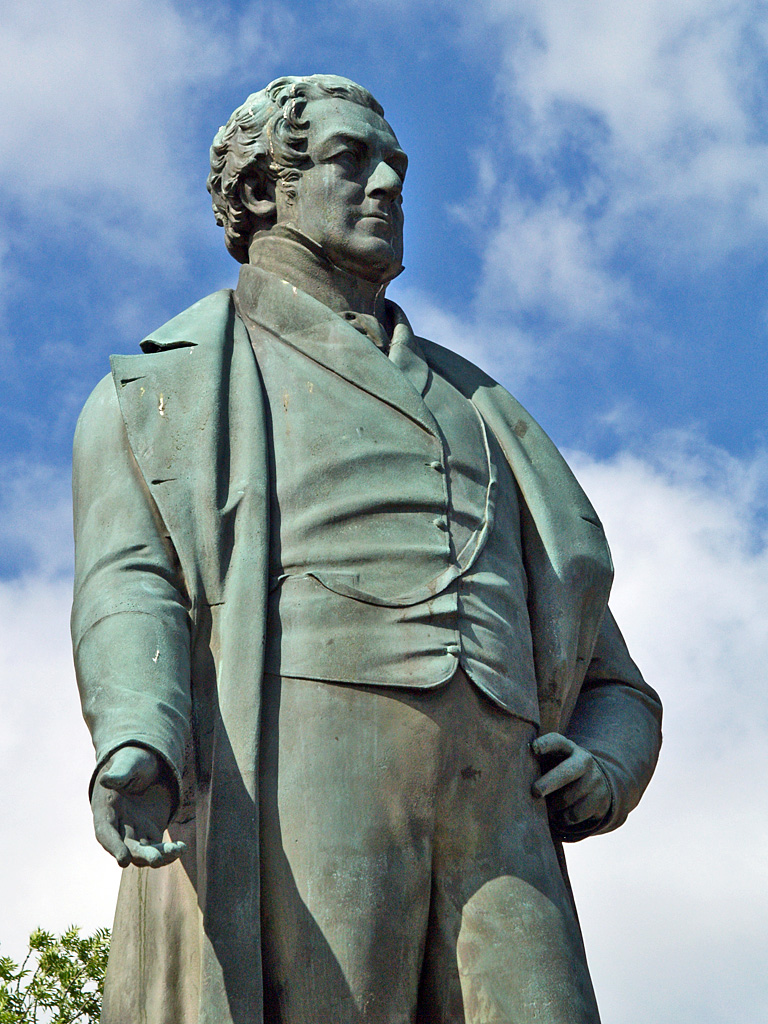
Statue of Sir Robert Peel by Edward Hodges Baily

- Sir Robert Peel (1788–1850), the 19th century prime minister was born in Bury. He is best known today for the repeal of the Corn Laws and his introduction of the modern police force. (Note: Hence the nicknames "Bobbie" and "Peeler".) He is also notable for forming the famous British Police division, Scotland Yard in London. A monument, Peel Tower, now exists to his memory; it is situated nearly 1,000 feet (300 m) above sea level, so is easily recognisable for miles around. The tower itself was not built for Sir Robert, but to provide work for local workers and was later dedicated to him. The Peel Memorial stands in Market Place, outside the eponymous public house; it has his waistcoat fastened the wrong way around.
- John Kay (1704–c.1779), the inventor of the flying shuttle, one of the key inventions of the Industrial Revolution. He was born to a yeoman farming family at Park, a hamlet just north of Bury, on 16 June 1704. A memorial to John Kay stands in the heart of Bury in Kay Gardens. He also features as one of twelve subjects of the Manchester Murals by Ford Madox Brown which decorate the Great Hall of Manchester Town Hall and depict the history of the city. The piece shows Kay being smuggled to safety as rioters, who feared their jobs were in danger, sought to destroy looms whose invention he had made possible. This was a key moment in the struggle between labour and new technology. He eventually fled to France and died in poverty.
- James Wood (1760–1839), mathematician, Dean of Ely and Master of St John's College, Cambridge, was born at Holcombe, Bury. A pupil at Bury Grammar School, he won an exhibition to St John's College and was a college tutor from 1789 to 1814. During this time he published The Principles of Mathematics and Natural Philosophy. He was appointed Dean of Ely in 1820. He served as Master of St John's from 1815 and left his library to the college upon his death.
- Professor Sir John Charnley (1911–1982), born the son of a Bury pharmacist. He wrote The Closed Treatment of Common Fractures, first published in 1950, which became a standard text for the subject. His subsequent achievement in developing hip replacement surgery, in 1962, is acknowledged as a ground breaking development that changed the approach to orthopaedic surgery. He established a centre for hip surgery at Wrightington Hospital, near Wigan where he worked. He was knighted for his work in 1977. The John Charnley Research Institute at Wrightington Hospital, near Wigan, was named in his honour.

=== Actors ===
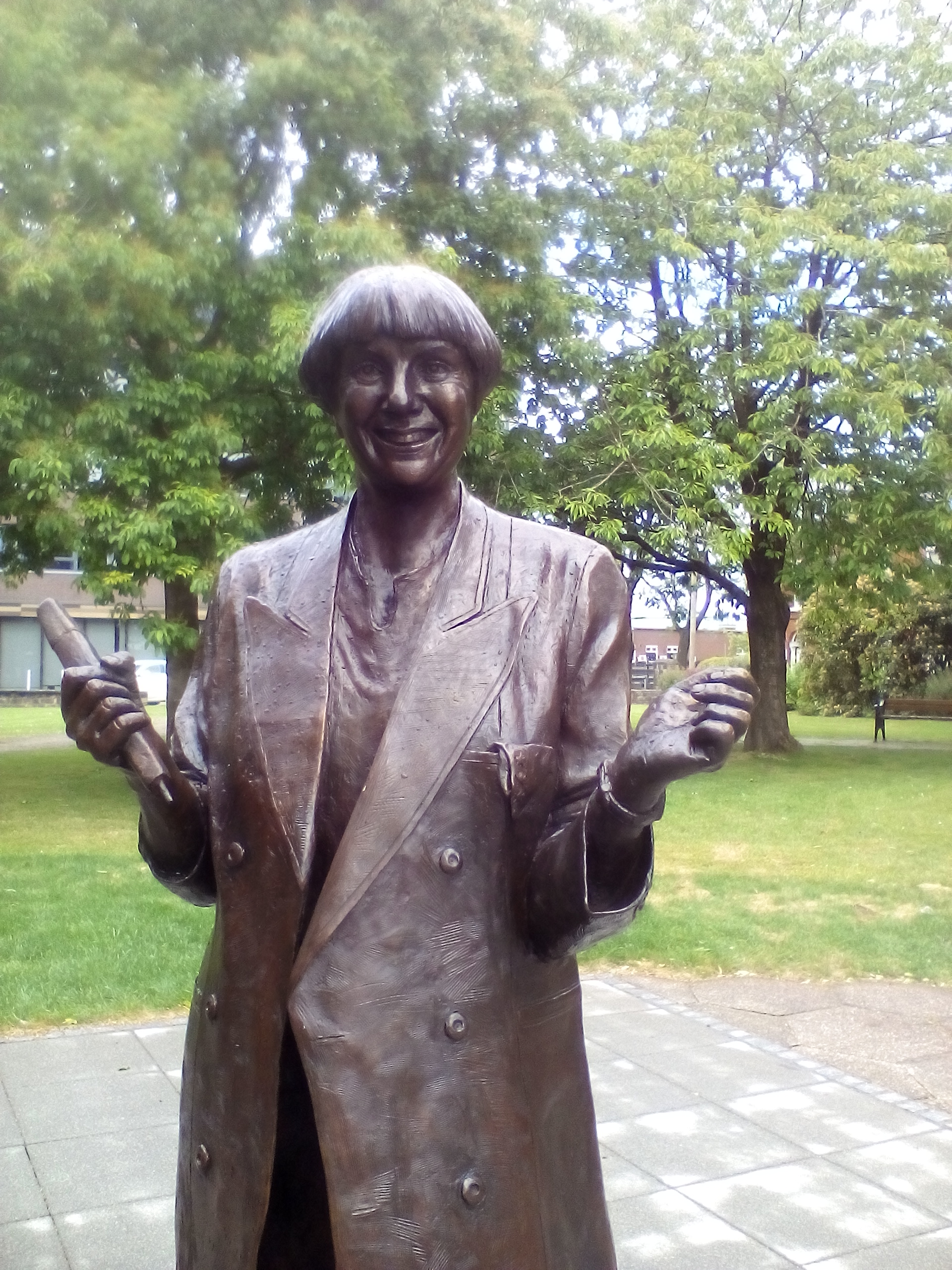
Statue of Victoria Wood, in Library Gardens

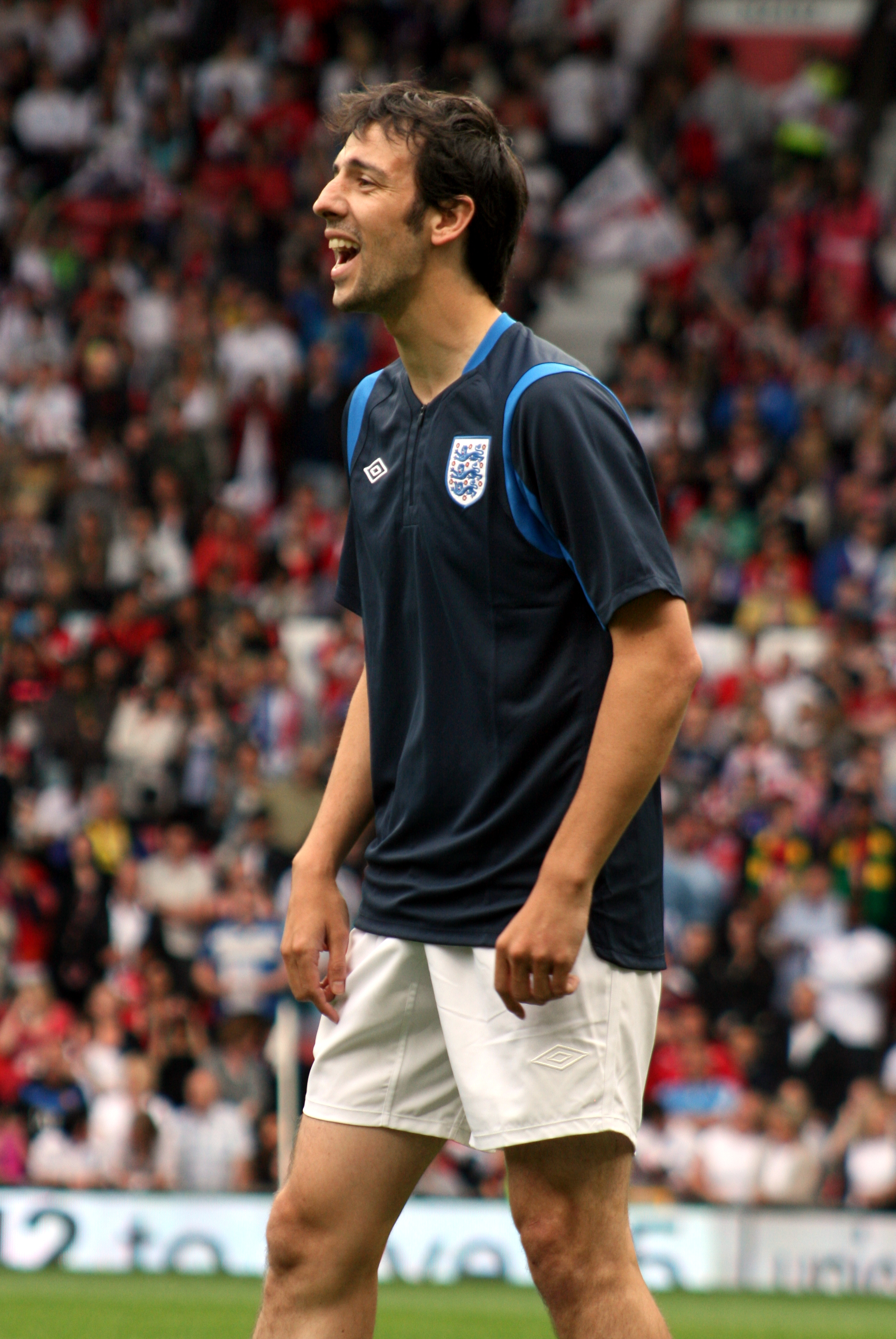
Ralf Little (2010)

- Steve Halliwell (1946–2023), actor best known as Zak Dingle in Emmerdale
- Victoria Wood (1953–2016), comedian, composer and actor from nearby Prestwich. Bury hosts her statue opposite the central library.
- Christian McKay (born 1973), actor, played Orson Welles in the film Me and Orson Welles.
- Jamie Lomas (born 1975), actor best known as Warren Fox in Hollyoaks. He is the brother of Charley Webb.
- Nigel Pilkington (born 1975), actor, writer and voice actor
- Antony Cotton (born 1975), actor and TV host best known as Sean Tully in Coronation Street
- Lisa Riley (born 1976), actress and TV presenter best known as Mandy Dingle in Emmerdale
- Ralf Little (born 1980), actor, best known for playing Antony Royle in The Royle Family and Johnny Keogh in Two Pints of Lager and a Packet of Crisps; also a semi-pro footballer
- Suzanne Shaw (born 1981), singer, actress and TV presenter; won the show Popstars and member of Hear'say
- Matt Littler (born 1982), actor best known as Max Cunningham in Hollyoaks, a pupil at Elton High School
- Jennie McAlpine (born 1984), actress best known as Fiz Brown in Coronation Street, a pupil at St Gabriel's Roman Catholic High School
- Gemma Atkinson (born 1984), radio presenter, former actress and model
- Rhian Sugden (born 1986), model and actress
- Charley Webb (born 1988), actress best known for playing Debbie Dingle in Emmerdale; sister of Jamie Lomas
- Helen Flanagan (born 1990), actress best known as Rosie Webster in Coronation Street
- Layton Williams (born 1994), actor, known for playing Stephen Carmichael in the TV series Bad Education.

=== Writers ===
- Thomas Thompson (1880–1951), writer, author and broadcaster, born in Bury and lived there for his whole life
- Richmal Crompton (1890–1969), author, was born on Manchester Road, Bury; a blue plaque marks the house. Her father, Rev. Edward John Sewell Lamburn, taught Classics at Bury Grammar School.
- Cyril Ray (1908–1991), writer and journalist.

=== Music ===
- Ian Wallace (1946–2007), drummer with rock band King Crimson and others, attended Bury Grammar School]
- Peter Skellern (1947–2017), singer-songwriter and pianist
- John Howard (born 1953), singer-songwriter, pianist, recording artist and published author
- David Whittaker (born 1957), video game composer
- Christian Savill (born 1970), guitarist with Slowdive
- Guy Garvey (born 1974), lead singer of alternative rock band Elbow
- Elliot James Reay (born 2002), singer-songwriter.

=== Politics ===
- Sir David Trippier (born 1945), former Member of Parliament (MP) for Rossendale and Darwen. Educated at Bury Grammar School
- David Crausby (born 1946), MP for Bolton North East was born in Bury. Educated at the Derby High School
- David Chaytor (born 1949), former MP for Bury North was born in Bury. Educated at Bury Grammar School
- Cherie Blair (born 1954), barrister and wife of former prime minister Tony Blair; stood for North Thanet in 1983
- Alistair Burt (born 1955), former MP 2001–19 for North East Bedfordshire was born in Bury and was school captain of Bury Grammar School. Prior to losing his seat to David Chaytor in 1997 he represented his hometown as MP for Bury North from 1983.

=== Sport ===
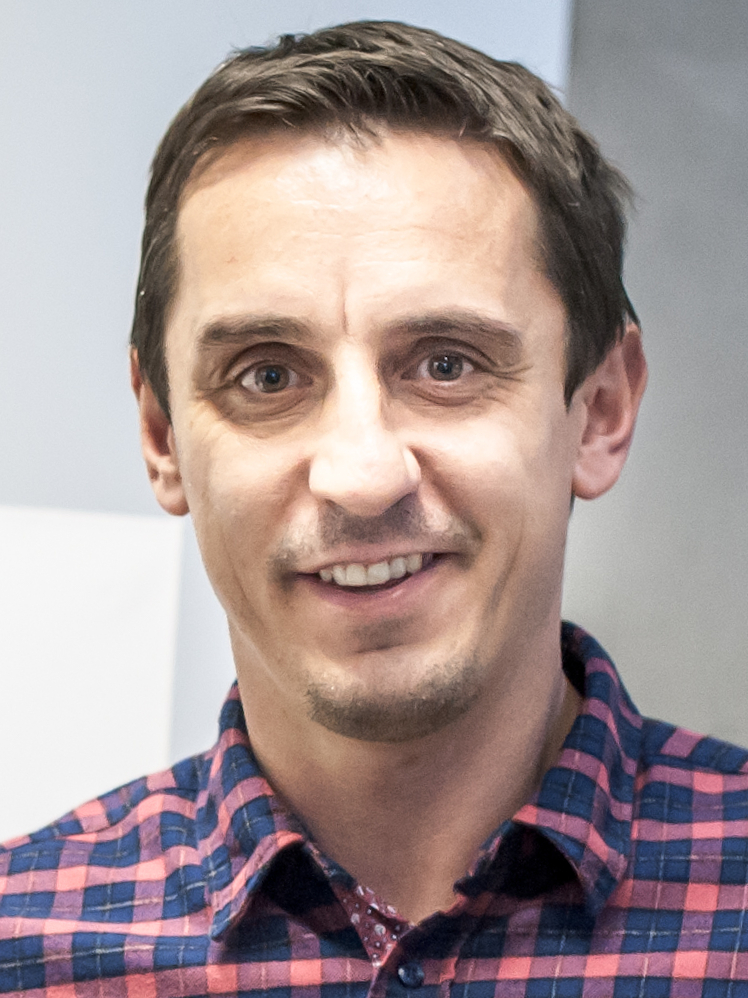
Gary Neville (2014)

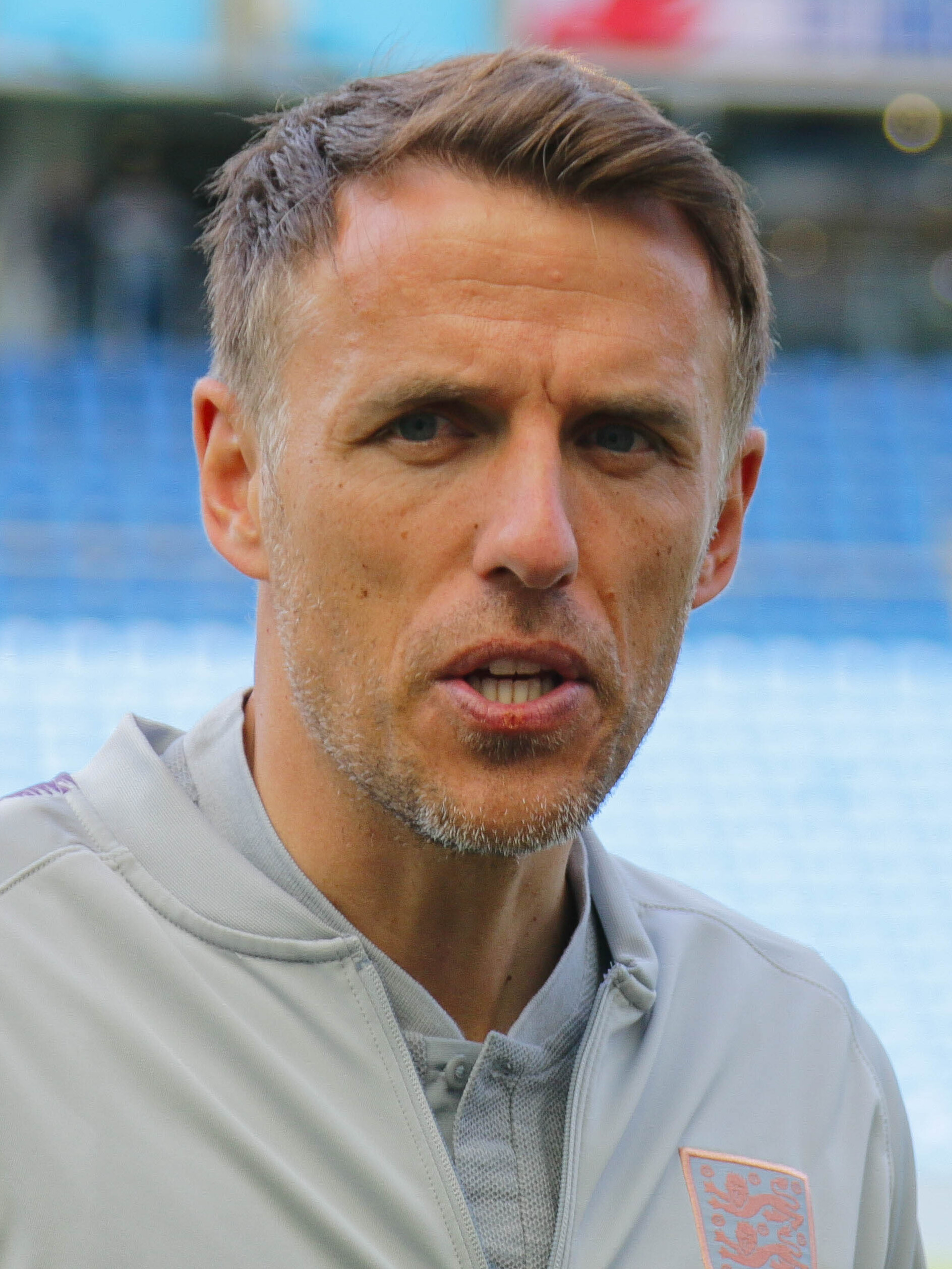
Phil Neville (2019)

- Barrie Kelly (born 1940), sprinter who competed in the 1968 Summer Olympics in Mexico City
- Lawrie Smith (born 1956), yachtsman, bronze medallist at the 1992 Summer Olympics, leaned to sail at Elton Sailing Club
- Andy Goram (1964–2022), footballer, played 620 games including 195 for Oldham Athletic plus 43 for Scotland
- Gary Neville (born 1975), footballer, played 400 games for Manchester United and 85 for England
- Tracey Neville (born 1977), netball international, played 81 games for England
- Phil Neville (born 1977), footballer, played 505 games, including 263 for Manchester United, 242 for Everton and 59 for England; twin of Tracey
- Scott Quigg (born 1988), current British super-bantamweight boxing champion and WBA Champion
- Kieran Trippier (born 1990), footballer, played over 440 games, including 154 for Burnley and 54 for England
- Nicky Ajose (born 1991), footballer, who played 286 games and coach at Exeter City
- James Guy (born 1995), swimmer, gold medallist at the 2020 Summer Olympics in Tokyo
- Callum Styles (born 2000), footballer played over 240 games, including 135 for Barnsley and 26 for Hungary
- Rico Lewis (born 2004), footballer with Manchester City, played 62 games and five for England
- Twins Adam and Simon Yates (born 1992), professional cyclists, attended Derby High School.

== Twin towns ==
The Metropolitan Borough of Bury has five twin towns in China, France, Germany and the United States. Two of these were originally twinned with areas within the Metropolitan Borough prior to its creation in 1974.

Country	Place	County / District / Region / State	Originally twinned with	Date	Notes
China	Datong	Shanxi	Metropolitan Borough of Bury	2003	
France	Angoulême	Poitou-Charentes	County Borough of Bury	1959	After which the 'Angoulême Retail Park' and the road 'Angoulême Way' are named.
France	Tulle	Limousin	Municipal Borough of Prestwich	1969	
Germany	Schorndorf	Baden-Württemberg	Metropolitan Borough of Bury	1994	
United States	Woodbury	New Jersey	Metropolitan Borough of Bury	2000	

== See also ==
- Listed buildings in Bury
- Healthcare in Greater Manchester
- Bury power station
