= North West Enquirer =

Newspaper published in Manchester, England

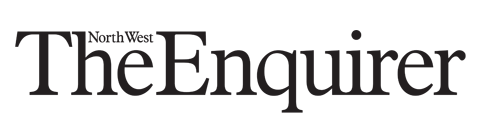
- Type: Weekly newspaper
- Format: Tabloid
- Owner: independent
- Editor: Robert Waterhouse
- Founded: 27 April 2006
- Ceased publication: 14 September 2006
- Headquarters: Faulkner Street, Manchester
- Price: £1.00
- Website: nw-enquirer.co.uk

The North West Enquirer was a short-lived weekly regional tabloid newspaper covering the North West region of England. Its circulation area encompassed the counties and areas of Cumbria, Lancashire, Greater Manchester, Merseyside and Cheshire, as well as parts of Stoke-on-Trent and North Wales. Its first edition was published on 27 April 2006 and it ran for twenty-one issues, the final edition being published on 14 September.

The Enquirer was an attempt to create a newspaper which had more of a focus on quality writing and analysis than the main local dailies such as the Manchester Evening News but with a more regional outlook than the national press could offer. The paper was aimed at the AB demographic group, high earners with large amounts of disposable income. While many local newspapers satisfied themselves with more populist human-interest stories, the Enquirer contained a large amount of arts and political coverage, with weekly columns exploring the culture of the region from names including Flic Everett and Anthony H Wilson. News coverage was of an investigative, in-depth style.

However, the paper quickly got into difficulties, falling short of a sales target of 15,000 in its first four months and laying off several journalists in August . The company attempted to re-finance, but a change in the conditions of a £200,000 funding package led to the Enquirer being placed into administration on 20 September, one day before it was due to publish its twenty-second issue . Twenty-six redundancies were made, with the company unable to pay staff for the month of September, leaving many financially unsettled. The following day, this message was placed on the North West Enquirer's web site by former editor Robert Waterhouse :

Very sadly, after just 21 issues, we have been forced to suspend publication of The Enquirer because the funding package we were negotiating with regional venture capital funds fell apart at the last moment. The company is now in administration. There may yet be a rescue bid. Let’s just hope something transpires.

As editor, I’d like to thank readers for your very generous response to our website. We know that The Enquirer is well read around the world, and the number of hits was growing fast week by week. Thank you again.

As of May 2007, the Enquirer's web site had been replaced with an ISP holding page explaining that the site was inactive.

== Related links ==
- The North West Enquirer (currently inactive)
- North West Enquirer: End of a Dream - Press Gazette
