= List of public art in Greater Manchester =

This is a list of public art in Greater Manchester, England, organised by metropolitan district.

The list includes only works of public art that are accessible in outdoor public spaces. For example, it does not include artwork that is visible only inside a museum.

Greater Manchester shown in England

== Bolton ==
Image	Title / individual commemorated	Location	Date	Sculptor / designer	Coordinates	Source
	Samuel Crompton	Nelson Square, Bolton	1862	William Calder Marshall	53.5795°N 2.4115°W	
	Samuel Taylor Chadwick	Victoria Square, Bolton	1873	Charles Bell Birch	53.5781°N 2.4296°W	
	Benjamin Disraeli	Queen's Park, Bolton	1887	Thomas Rawcliffe	53.5793°N 2.4454°W	
	John Fielding	Queen's Park, Bolton	1896	J. Bowden	53.5791°N 2.4459°W	
	James Dorrian	Queen's Park, Bolton	1898	John Cassidy	53.5794°N 2.4449°W	
	Benjamin Alfred Dobson	Victoria Square, Bolton	1900	John Cassidy	53.5787°N 2.4298°W	
	Bolton Cenotaph	Victoria Square, Bolton	1928	A. J. Hope	53.5784°N 2.4296°W	
	Two Forms (Divided Circle) 1969	University of Bolton	1982	Barbara Hepworth	53.5736°N 2.4357°W	
	Fred Dibnah	Oxford Street, Bolton	2008	Jane Robbins	53.5793°N 2.4302°W	

== Bury ==
Image	Title / individual commemorated	Location	Date	Sculptor / designer	Coordinates	Source
	Memorial to Robert Peel	Market Place, Bury	1851	Edward Hodges Baily	53.5937°N 2.2977°W	
	Lancashire Fusiliers' South African War Memorial	Whitehead Gardens, Bury	1905	George Frampton	53.5886°N 2.3011°W	
	Lancashire Fusiliers War Memorial (First World War)	Gallipoli Gardens, Bury	1922	Edwin Lutyens	53.5922°N 2.2987°W	
	Radcliffe Cenotaph	Blackburn Street, Radcliffe	1922	Sydney March	53.5625°N 2.3280°W	
	Bury War Memorial	The Rock, Bury	1924	Reginald Blomfield	53.5938°N 2.2975°W	
	Tilted Vase	Carr Street, Ramsbottom	1998	Edward Allington	53.6489°N 2.3185°W	
	Picnic Area	Burrs Country Park	1998	David Fryer	53.6097°N 2.3062°W	
	Nailing Home	Smyrna Street / Ainsworth Road, Radcliffe	1999	Jack Wright	53.5645°N 2.3336°W	
	From Northern Soul (Bury Neon)	Bury Interchange	2011	Ron Silliman	53.5908°N 2.2970°W	
	Victoria Wood	Library Gardens, Bury	2019	Graham Ibbeson	53.5908°N 2.2970°W	

== Manchester ==
Image	Title / individual commemorated	Location	Date	Sculptor / designer	Coordinates	Source
	Robert Peel	Piccadilly Gardens	1853	William Calder Marshall	53.4814°N 2.2375°W	
	John Dalton	Chester Street	1855	William Theed	53.4719°N 2.2404°W	
	Duke of Wellington	Piccadilly Gardens	1856	Matthew Noble	53.4809°N 2.2357°W	
	James Watt	Piccadilly Gardens	1857	William Theed	53.4813°N 2.2366°W	
	Albert Memorial	Albert Square	1867	Statue Matthew Noble / Canopy Thomas Worthington	53.4795°N 2.2452°W	
	Richard Cobden	St Ann's Square	1867	Marshall Wood	53.481°N 2.2457°W	
	Oliver Cromwell	Wythenshawe Hall	1875	Matthew Noble	53.4048°N 2.2768°W	
	James Fraser	Albert Square	1888	Thomas Woolner	53.4799°N 2.2450°W	
	John Bright	Albert Square	1891	Albert Bruce-Joy	53.4797°N 2.2451°W	
	Oliver Heywood	Albert Square	1894	Albert Bruce-Joy	53.4793°N 2.2454°W	
	Queen Victoria	Piccadilly Gardens	1901	Edward Onslow Ford	53.4811°N 2.2366°W	
	William Gladstone	Albert Square	1901	Mario Raggi	53.4791°N 2.2455°W	
	Adrift	St Peter's Square	1908	John Cassidy	53.4781°N 2.2437°W	
	The Last Shot / South African War Memorial	St Ann's Square	1908	Hamo Thornycroft	53.4825°N 2.2455°W	
	Edward VII	Whitworth Park	1913	John Cassidy	53.4595°N 2.2283°W	
	Abraham Lincoln	Lincoln Square, Brazennose Street	1919	George Grey Barnard	53.4797°N 2.2472°W	
	Manchester Cenotaph	St Peter's Square	1924	Edwin Lutyens	53.4776°N 2.2438°W	
	Messenger of Peace	Cooper Street	1986–2018	Barbara Pearson	53.4787°N 2.2430°W	
	Monument to Vimto	Granby Row	1992	Kerry Morrison	53.4753°N 2.2345°W	
	Robert Owen	Balloon Street	1994	Gilbert Bayes	53.4861°N 2.2411°W	
	Life Cycle	Deansgate	1995	George Wyllie	53.4744°N 2.2516°W	
	Ishinki Touchstone	Barbirolli Square	1996	Kan Yasuda	53.4759°N 2.2456°W	
	The Big Horn/Tib Street Horn	Tib Street	1999	David Kemp	53.4827°N 2.2367°W	
	John Barbirolli	Barbirolli Square	2000	Byron Howard	53.4756°N 2.2459°W	
	Memorial to Alan Turing	Sackville Gardens	2001	Glyn Hughes	53.4767°N 2.2360°W	
	Tree of Remembrance	Piccadilly Gardens	2005	Wolfgang and Heron	53.4811°N 2.2378°W	
	B of the Bang	Beswick	2005–2009	Thomas Heatherwick	53.4819°N 2.1961°W	
	Frédéric Chopin	Deansgate	2011	Robert Sobociński	53.4789°N 2.2450°W	
	Friedrich Engels	Tony Wilson Place	c. 1970s, relocated 2017		53.4735°N 2.2462°W	Relocated from Ukraine in 2017 by the artist Phil Collins.
	Peterloo	People's History Museum	2018	Axel Void	53.4815°N 2.1444°W	
	Homeless Jesus	St Ann's Church	2018	Timothy Schmalz	53.4818°N 2.2458°W	
	Victory Over Blindness	Piccadilly Approach, Manchester Piccadilly	2018	Johanna Domke-Guyot	53.4779°N 2.2315°W	
	Rise up, Women, statue of Emmeline Pankhurst	St Peter's Square	2018	Hazel Reeves	53.4778°N 2.2431°W	
	Mahatma Gandhi	Cathedral Yard	2019	Ram V. Sutar	53.4848°N 2.2456°W	
	Tower of Light and Wall of Energy	Lower Mosley Street	2022	Tonkin Liu	53.4754°N 2.2469°W	
	The Glade of Light	Victoria Street	2022	BCA Landscape and Smiling Wolf	53.4857°N 2.2447°W	

== Oldham ==
Image	Title / individual commemorated	Location	Date	Sculptor / designer	Coordinates	Source
	John Platt	Alexandra Park	1878, relocated to park in 1924	David Watson Stevenson	53.5349°N 2.1051°W	
	Robert Ascroft	Alexandra Park	1903	F. W. Pomeroy	53.5342°N 2.1028°W	
	Oldham War Memorial	Church Street, Oldham	1923	Thomas Taylor	53.5422°N 2.1112°W	
	Crompton War Memorial	High Street, Shaw and Crompton	1923	Richard Reginald Goulden	53.5752°N 2.0960°W	
Stanton Moor sandstone depiction of pub snug	Outside Inn	Main Street, Failsworth	1993	Tim Shutter	53.5113°N 2.1562°W	
	Oldham Owls	Old Town Hall	2017	Benedict Phillips	53.5411°N 2.1113°W	
	Annie Kenney	Old Town Hall	2018	Denise Dutton	53.5420°N 2.1108°W	

== Rochdale ==
Image	Title / individual commemorated	Location	Date	Sculptor / designer	Coordinates	Source
	George Leach Ashworth	Broadfield Park, Rochdale	1878	W. & T. Wills	53.6134°N 2.1601°W	
	John Bright	Broadfield Park, Rochdale	1891	Hamo Thornycroft	53.6145°N 2.162291°W	
	Dialect Writers' Memorial	Broadfield Park, Rochdale	1900	John Cassidy and Edward Sykes	53.6147°N 2.1615°W	
	Rochdale Cenotaph	The Esplanade, Rochdale	1922	Edwin Lutyens	53.616238°N 2.159743°W	
	Unity	The Esplanade, Rochdale	1995	Alec Peever	53.615337°N 2.16104°W	
	Rochdale Olympics	Nelson Street, Rochdale	2002	Adrian Moakes	53.61587°N 2.15535°W	
	Gracie Fields	Rochdale Town Hall	2016	Sean Hedges-Quinn	53.61640°N 2.15812°W	

== Salford ==
Image	Title / individual commemorated	Location	Date	Sculptor / designer	Coordinates	Source
	Queen Victoria	Peel Park	1857	Matthew Noble	53.484775°N 2.272133°W	
	Joseph Brotherton	Peel Park	1858	Matthew Noble	53.48777°N 2.27083°W	
	Prince Albert	The Crescent, Salford	1864	Robinson and Cottam	53.48492°N 2.2722°W	
	Flood Obelisk	Peel Park	1867	Bradshaw and Gass	53.48777°N 2.27083°W	
	Lancashire Fusiliers' South African War Memorial	Chapel Street / Oldfield Road	1905	George Frampton	53.483031°N 2.264078°W	
	Untitled	University of Salford	1966	William Mitchell	53.48833°N 2.27916°W	
	Monument to the Third Millennium	Peel Park	2000	Adrian Moakes	53.48722°N 2.27017°W	
	Fabric of Nature	Peel Park	2000	Julia Hilton	53.48740°N 2.27017°W	
	Salford Firsts	Bexley Square, Salford	2021	Emma Rodgers	53.48740°N 2.27017°W	

== Stockport ==
Image	Title / individual commemorated	Location	Date	Sculptor / designer	Coordinates	Source
	Richard Cobden	St Peter's Square, Stockport	1886	George Gammon Adams	53.4094°N 2.1594°W	
	Heaton Chapel and Heaton Moor War Memorial	Heaton Moor Road, Heaton Moor	1921	J. Henry Sellers and John Cassidy	53.4222°N 2.1854°W	
	BHS Murals	Deanery Way, Stockport	1978	Henry and Joyce Collins	53.4119°N 2.1600°W	
	The River of Life	Source of the River Mersey, Stockport	1994 / 1996	Mind Stockport / Alison Simpson	53.4144°N 2.1563°W	
	Memorial to James Conway	Wellington Road South, Stockport	2017	Luke Perry	53.4053°N 2.1583°W	
	Merseyway Mural	Merseyway Shopping Centre, Stockport	2024	Caitlin Atherton	53.4105°N 2.1597°W	
	Stockport Interchange Mural	Stockport Interchange	2025	Caitlin Atherton	53.4086°N 2.1634°W	

== Tameside ==
Image	Title / individual commemorated	Location	Date	Sculptor / designer	Coordinates	Source
	Hugh Mason	Trafalgar Square, Ashton-under-Lyne	1887	Joseph Swynnerton	53.4798°N 2.1083°W	
	Stalybridge War Memorial	Trinity Street, Stalybridge	c. 1921	Ferdinand Blundstone	53.4838°N 2.0566°W	
	Ashton-under-Lyne War Memorial	Old Street, Ashton-under-Lyne	1922	Percy Howard	53.4649°N 2.0879°W	
	The Family	Market Square, Ashton-under-Lyne	1995	Paul Margetts	53.4893°N 2.0916°W	
	Colonel Duckenfield	King Street, Dukinfield	1996	Escar UK Bronze	53.4528°N 2.0479°W	
	Ashton Munitions Explosion Memorial	Stamford Street West, Ashton-under-Lyne	2002	Paul Margetts	53.4848°N 2.1023°W	
	Pull the Plug, Ring the Change	Market Street, Hyde	2002	Stephen Broadbent	53.4508°N 2.0797°W	
	The Ashton Town Centre Monument	George Street, Ashton-under-Lyne	2002	Michael Johnson	53.4878°N 2.0914°W	
	L. S. Lowry	Stalybridge Road, Mottram in Longdendale	2005	Escar UK Bronze and John Cox	53.4577°N 2.0115°W	
	Jack Judge	Trinity Street, Stalybridge	2005	Escar UK Bronze and John Cox	53.4829°N 2.0561°W	
	Tipping the Denton Linney	Market Street, Denton	2005	Escar UK Bronze and John Cox	53.4550°N 2.1145°W	
	The Ashton Market Trader – 'Uncle John' the Pieman	Bow Street, Denton	2008	Escar UK Bronze and John Cox	53.4888°N 2.0920°W	
	Coal Miner	Market Street, Ashton-under-Lyne	2008	Peter Walker	53.4878°N 2.0925°W	
	Street Urchin – Boy, Hand to Nose	Old Street, Ashton-under-Lyne	2008	Castle Fine Arts Foundry and Peter Walker	53.4883°N 2.0936°W	
	Street Urchin – Boy, Peekaboo	Old Street, Ashton-under-Lyne	2008	Castle Fine Arts Foundry and Peter Walker		
	Street Urchin – Girl, Peekaboo	Market Street, Ashton-under-Lyne	2008	Castle Fine Arts Foundry and Peter Walker		
	Lord Sheldon Way Statues	Lord Sheldon Way, Ashton-under-Lyne	2008	Peter Walker		
	Tameside's World Cup Heroes; Geoff Hurst, Jimmy Armfield, Simone Perrotta	Richmond Street, Ashton-under-Lyne	2010	Castle Fine Arts Foundry and Andy Edwards	53.4942°N 2.1111°W	

== Trafford ==
Image	Title / individual commemorated	Location	Date	Sculptor / designer	Coordinates	Source
	James Prescott Joule	Worthington Park, Sale	1905	John Cassidy		
	Sky Hooks	Trafford Wharf Road, Trafford Park	1995	Brian Fell	53.4649°N 2.2840°W 53.4652°N 2.2857°W	
	Matt Busby	Old Trafford	1996	Philip Jackson	53.4634°N 2.2897°W	
	The Worthington Park Lions	Worthington Park, Sale	2006			
	The United Trinity	Old Trafford	2008	Philip Jackson	53.4640°N 2.2874°W	
	Alex Ferguson	Old Trafford	2012	Philip Jackson	53.4641°N 2.2913°W	
	Frank Sidebottom	Stockport Road, Timperley	2013	Michael Moorhouse	53.3975°N 2.3175°W	

== Wigan ==
Image	Title / individual commemorated	Location	Date	Sculptor / designer	Coordinates	Source
	Tyldesley Monument	Wigan Lane, Wigan	1679		53.5548°N 2.6280°W	
	Francis Powell	Mesnes Park, Wigan	1910	Ernest Gillick	53.5517°N 2.6353°W	
	Wigan War Memorial	Wallgate, Wigan	1925	Giles Gilbert Scott	53.5457°N 2.6325°W	
	Face of Wigan	Believe Square, Wigan	2008	Rick Kirby	53.5461°N 2.6299°W	
	John Woods	Sale Way, Leigh	2016	Stephen Charnock	53.4900°N 2.5314°W	
	Billy Boston	Believe Square, Wigan	2016	Steve Winterburn	53.5458°N 2.6304°W	
	Alfred Robert Wilkinson	Pennington Wharf, Leigh	2018	Andy Burgess	53.4929°N 2.5540°W	
	Wigan Heritage & Mining Monument	Library Street, Wigan	2021	Steve Winterburn	53.5449°N 2.6292°W	
	Pete Shelley mural	Back Salford, Leigh	2022	Akse P19	53.4971°N 2.5203°W	
	Snail on Me	Haigh Woodland Park, Haigh Hall	2025	Anne Duk Hee Jordan		
