= White Lion (disambiguation) =

White Lion is a Danish/American rock band.

White Lion may also refer to:

== Pubs ==
- White Lion, Barthomley, a pub in Cheshire, England
- White Lion, Covent Garden, a pub in London, England
- White Lion, Delph, a pub in Greater Manchester, England
- White Lion, Stockport, a pub in Greater Manchester
- White Lion, Westhoughton, a pub in Greater Manchester
- White Lion, Withington, a former pub in Manchester, England
- White Lion Inn, Stratford-upon-Avon, a historical inn in Warwickshire, England
- The White Lion, Putney, a pub in London
- The White Lion, St Albans, a pub in Hertfordshire, England
- The White Lion, Thornbury, a pub in Gloucestershire, England

== Other ==
- White Lion Records, a Puerto Rican record label
- White Lion (film), a 2010 South African film directed by Michael Swan
- White Lion (privateer), a ship that took the first Africans to English America

== See also ==
- White lion, a colour mutation of the lion
- Kimba the White Lion, a Japanese manga series
- Old White Lion, Bury, a pub in Greater Manchester, England
- Order of the White Lion, the highest order awarded by the Czech Republic
- Snow Lion, a celestial animal of Tibet in the form of a white lion
- The White Lions, a 1981 American film
- White Lion Society, a British heraldry organisation
