= Listed buildings in Bury =

Bury is a town in the Metropolitan Borough of Bury, Greater Manchester, England, and it is unparished. The central area of the town and the surrounding countryside contain 75 listed buildings that are recorded in the National Heritage List for England. Of these, one is listed at Grade I, the highest of the three grades, three are at Grade II*, the middle grade, and the others are at Grade II, the lowest grade.

Since the Industrial Revolution Bury has been mainly an industrial and commercial town, its major industry in the past being cotton, with diversification of industries since. The listed buildings include farmhouses in the surrounding countryside, private houses and associated structures in and around the central area, churches, public houses, banks and other commercial buildings, civic buildings, structures associated with the East Lancashire Railway and the Manchester, Bolton and Bury Canal, an armoury, two drinking fountains, a statue of Sir Robert Peel, a bridge, monuments, and three war memorials.

== Key ==
Grade	Criteria
I	Buildings of exceptional interest, sometimes considered to be internationally important
II*	Particularly important buildings of more than special interest
II	Buildings of national importance and special interest

== Buildings ==
Name and location	Photograph	Date	Notes	Grade
Bury Bridge; 53.59479°N 2.30754°W		Medieval	The bridge carries Bolton Street (A58 road) over the River Irwell. It is built in sandstone, gritstone and reinforced concrete, and has been altered and extended through the centuries. The bridge consists of three segmental arches with triangular cutwaters and a splayed western end.	II
Smethurst Hall; 53.60256°N 2.24969°W	—	16th century	A stone house, mainly with two storeys, in three parts. The central part is the oldest, it is rendered and has replaced windows. To the left is a cross-wing dating from the late 17th or early 18th century, with mullioned windows, including an attic window, and a modern porch. The right section dates probably from the late 19th century. it is taller and has three bays, the right bay projecting and gabled.	II
Baldingstone House; 53.62461°N 2.29209°W	—	c. 1615	A stone house with a stone gutter cornice and a stone slab roof that has been altered and extended. There are two storeys, and the windows are mullioned, some with hood moulds.	II
Broad Oak Farmhouse; 53.59848°N 2.25878°W	—	Early 17th century	The farmhouse is in three sections, the left section being the latest, dating probably from the 18th century. The house is in stone and has two storeys. Some of the windows have retained their mullions, and others have been replaced by sash or casement windows. There is a doorway in each section.	II
Cottage north of Sissinghurst Farmhouse; 53.61254°N 2.27205°W	—	17th century	The cottage is in stone with a stone slab roof. It has two storeys, two bays, and a single-storey outbuilding with a slate roof. The windows are mullioned, with hood moulds over the ground floor windows. The doorway is in the left gable end, and has split chamfered piers and a large lintel.	II
Haslam Bank House; 53.58623°N 2.30213°W	—	17th century	The house contains earlier timber framed material. It is in stone with a stone flagged roof, and has two storeys and three irregular bays. There are two doorways, and the windows are mullioned, some with hood moulds.	II
The Manor House, The Crest and The Nook; 53.57484°N 2.29308°W	—	17th century	Three brick houses, built in phases. Along the front are eight windows, mainly sashes. On the left are two gables with bargeboards, each containing two windows, the right part also with quoins. On the ground floor are bow windows. The right part projects, and contains a canted bay window; it has a dentilled cornice and a hipped roof. At the rear are two mullioned windows.	II
The Two Tubs Inn; 53.59400°N 2.29798°W		Late 17th century (probable)	The public house is basically timber framed with 18th-century brick cladding, 19th-century render, and a stone slab roof. There are two storeys and three bays. The windows are sashes, and the doorway has a canopy on Ionic columns. In the left gable end are two horizontally-sliding sash windows.	II
Old Bridge Hall; 53.59308°N 2.26675°W	—	Late 17th to early 18th century	The house is in ashlar stone with some brick. and was extended in the 19th century. There are two storeys and some original mullioned windows. The 19th-century additions include a bay window, a doorway, a coved gutter cornice, and a flat-roofed extension.	II
Sissinghurst Farmhouse; 53.61232°N 2.27185°W	—	c. 1700	The farmhouse is in stone with a string course and a stone slab roof. There are two storeys, a double pile plan, and two bays. The windows are mullioned, and some have hood moulds. There are two doorways, one of which is blocked.	II
Lower Chesham; 53.59848°N 2.28084°W	—	1713	Part of a large house, built in the style of the 17th century. It is in stone, with two string courses, a cornice, and a stone slab roof with coped gables, and ball finials. There are three storeys and two bays. The windows are mullioned, and there is a blocked doorway with a moulded architrave.	II*
1 and 3 The Starkies and screen wall 53.57942°N 2.29667°W	—	Early 18th century	Originally a coaching inn, it was altered in the 19th century, and has been converted into two dwellings. The house has an irregular plan, it is partly in stone and partly in brick, and has two and three storeys. The doorway to No. 3 has an architrave. The windows vary in type; some are mullioned, some are sashes, and there are French windows. In the link between the sections is bow window. The screen wall is in brick on a stone plinth and contains four oculi.	II
Bast House; 53.63348°N 2.29734°W	—	Early 18th century (probable)	A stone house with a brick buttress and gable, and a slate roof. There are two storeys, two bays, and a later rear wing. Some of the windows are mullioned, and others have round heads; some of these have hood moulds.	II
Elton House; 53.59406°N 2.32322°W	—	1731	A stone house with two storeys and an attic, and a front of five bays. On the ground floor is a central doorway with a classical surround and a dated open pediment is flanked by 19th-century square bay windows. The upper floor contains sash windows with architraves that have concave chamfers, and in the attic on the left side is an original mullioned casement window with a hood mould.	II
6 and 8 The Starkies; 53.57968°N 2.29631°W	—	18th century	A pair of red brick houses with an irregular plan. The main part has two storeys and four bays, and there is a wing with 1 1/2 storeys. The windows vary; one is louvred, others are sashes, and one is in a blind elliptical arch. No. 6 has a doorway dating from 1800 that has a doorcase with Gothic panels and consoles.	II
Boundary wall, Manchester Road; 53.57906°N 2.29701°W	—	18th century	The wall is in deep red brick, on a stone plinth and has a flat ashlar coping. The wall is about 15 feet (4.6 m) tall.	II
The Cottage; 53.57952°N 2.29641°W	—	18th century	A red brick house on a stone plinth with a stone slab roof. There are two storeys and three bays. Most of the windows on the front are circular, and at the rear they are sashes. On the front are paired doorways with bevelled jambs and inscribed Tudor arched heads.	II
Calrows Farmhouse; 53.60488°N 2.30242°W	—	1770	The farmhouse was extended to the west probably in the 18th century, and a west wing was added at right angles, probably in the early 19th century. There are two storeys, the original parts are in stone with a decorated cornice, and the wing is in brick. The windows in the front of the original part are mullioned, at the rear is a mullioned and transomed, and in the centre of the front is a doorway. Above the doorway is a datestone with an inscription, initials and the date. The windows in the wing are sashes.	II
Church Rooms; 53.59470°N 2.29682°W	—	1784	Originally the grammar school, a wing was added at right angles in 1862. The original wing is in Classical style, and the later wing is Gothic. They are in stone and have slate roofs with coped gables. The original wing has six arched bays, an impost band, a cornice, and a blocking course. The doorway has a fanlight. The later wing has four bays, and contains mullioned and transomed windows with buttresses between.	II
Canal milestone 9 miles from Manchester; 53.55756°N 2.35232°W	—	1797	The milestone is on the south side of the Manchester, Bolton and Bury Canal, and is in buff sandstone. It has a rectangular cross-section with a flat top, and is about 0.5 metres (1 ft 8 in) in height. On the front is inscribed "M" and "9" in deeply-incised lettering.	II
Canal milestone 9¼ miles from Manchester; 53.55602°N 2.34766°W		1797	The milestone is on the west side of the Manchester, Bolton and Bury Canal, and is in buff sandstone. It has a rectangular cross-section with a pointed top, and is about 0.5 metres (1 ft 8 in) in height. On the front is inscribed "M" and "9¼" in deeply-incised lettering.	II
Canal milestone 9½ miles from Manchester; 53.55648°N 2.34243°W		1797	The milestone is on the southeast side of the Manchester, Bolton and Bury Canal, and is in buff sandstone. It has a rectangular cross-section with an arched head, and is about 0.5 metres (1 ft 8 in) in height. On the front is inscribed "M" and "9½" in deeply-incised lettering.	II
Canal milestone 9¾ miles from Manchester; 53.55820°N 2.33705°W		1797	The milestone is on the southeast side of the Manchester, Bolton and Bury Canal, and is in buff sandstone. It has a rectangular cross-section with a flat top, and is about 0.5 metres (1 ft 8 in) in height. On the front is inscribed "M" and "9¾" in deeply-incised lettering.	II
Canal milestone 11¼ miles from Manchester; 53.57415°N 2.31581°W		1797	The milestone is on the east side of the Manchester, Bolton and Bury Canal, and is in buff sandstone. It has a rectangular cross-section with an arched head, and is about 0.5 metres (1 ft 8 in) in height. On the front is inscribed "M" and 11¼"" in deeply-incised lettering.	II
Canal milestone 11¾ miles from Manchester; 53.58100°N 2.31390°W		1797	The milestone is on the east side of the Manchester, Bolton and Bury Canal, and is in buff sandstone. It has a rectangular cross-section with a flat top, and is about 0.5 metres (1 ft 8 in) in height. On the front is inscribed "M" and "11¾" in deeply-incised lettering.	II
108, 108A and 110 Manchester Road; 53.58688°N 2.30101°W	—	Early 19th century	A pair of brick houses with two storeys and five bays. The windows are sashes, and the round-headed doorways have fluted shafts and fanlights.	II
Finger post at SD 775 104; 53.58956°N 2.34200°W		Early 19th century	The signpost is in stone, and consists of a low post with a triangular section. On the front faces are pointing hands and the names of the destinations in those directions.	II
479–501 Rochdale Old Road; 53.60187°N 2.25540°W	—	1826	A terrace of stone houses with a sill band, stone gutter eaves and a slate roof. They have two storeys, and each house has one or two bays. Each house has an arched doorway with impost bands and a keystone.	II
Athenaeum Club; 53.59175°N 2.29814°W		1829	The building on a corner site is in red brick on a stone plinth, with a sill band, an eaves cornice, and a slate roof. There are two storeys and symmetrical fronts of three bays. The windows are sashes; the central window on the ground floor on the Moss Street front has a round-arched head, and the central window on the ground floor on the Knowsley Street front has an entablature and a pediment.	II
3 Manchester Road; 53.59100°N 2.29964°W	—	c. 1830	A house in red brick with a sill band, a box gutter cornice, two storeys and four bays. The doorway has a depressed arch and a fanlight, and is flanked by Ionic columns. The windows are sashes.	II
Direction Stone; 53.59659°N 2.30936°W	—	1834	The stone is at a road junction and is about 4 feet (1.2 m) tall, roughly square, and with a segmental head on each face. On two faces are place names, pointing hands, and on one face is the date.	II
St Paul's Church; 53.59602°N 2.28302°W		1838–1842	The church was designed by John Harper, and is in sandstone. It is now redundant, and has been badly damaged by fire. The church consists of a nave with a clerestory, north and south lean-to aisles, a chancel, and a partly enclosed west tower. The west end has a gabled doorway between buttresses, at the top of the tower are corner pinnacles, and most of the windows are lancets.	II
2–8 Bank Street; 53.59257°N 2.29962°W	—	c. 1840	A terrace in red brick with a sill band, a gutter cornice, and a blocking course. There are two storeys and nine bays. In the central bay on the ground floor is an arched window, the other windows are sashes with flat heads. The four doorways have segmental heads flanked by columns in free Corinthian style.	II
Heaton Grove; 53.57805°N 2.29614°W		c. 1840	A house in Italianate style, the main part in ashlar stone on a plinth, with quoins, a sill band, a cornice, and a parapet with four vases. There are two storeys and a symmetrical front of five bays. In the centre is a Doric porch with two pillars, two columns, and an entablature. The windows are sashes in moulded architraves with bracketed cornices. At the rear is an extension of about 1870 in rendered brick with stone dressings, and there is a stair tower with a conical roof.	II
St Marie's Church; 53.59127°N 2.29932°W		1841–42	A Roman Catholic church designed by John Harper in Perpendicular style. It is in ashlar stone, and consists of a nave and a short chancel. The gabled west front has a porch with a doorway flanked by statues in niches and an openwork parapet. Over this is a five-light window, and above the gable is an elaborate openwork octagonal lantern with an embattled parapet. The east window has six lights.	II
All Saints Church; 53.59652°N 2.31188°W		1841–1843	The church was designed by John Harper in Romanesque style. It is in sandstone with Welsh slate roofs, and consists of a nave, a west porch, north and south transepts, a north vestry and organ chamber, a chancel and a tower rising from it. The tower has three stages with clasping buttresses, triple arched bell openings in the top stage, and a cornice and an ashlar parapet.	II
St Mary's Church; 53.59402°N 2.29718°W		1842–1844	The medieval church was rebuilt in the 19th century, the steeple being the older part. The body of the church was replaced between 1872 and 1876 by J. S. Crowther. The steeple is in gritstone and the body of the church is in Darley Dale stone, and the roofs are slated. The church consists of a nave with a clerestory, a narthex at right angles at the southwest, north and south aisles, a chancel with a three-sided apse, a north vestry and organ chamber and a Lady Chapel at the south, and a west steeple. The steeple has a three-stage tower with buttresses and a broach spire with lucarnes. Flanking the chancel arch are stair turrets.	I
2–20 St Mary's Place; 53.59181°N 2.30029°W		1845	A terrace of ten brick houses on a stone plinth, with a sill band, an eaves cornice, a blocking course, and a slate roof. There are two storeys and each house has two bays. Most of the windows are sashes, and some have been altered. The doorways have round-arched heads, fluted pilasters, dentilled cornices, and fanlights.	II
Bury Transport Museum; 53.59458°N 2.30067°W		1846	This originated as a railway warehouse built by the East Lancashire Railway Company, and later used as a museum. It is in sandstone with quoins and voussoirs, and with a Welsh slate roof. It has a rectangular plan, and consists of three gabled ranges. There are three openings with semicircular heads on each front, and in the north front is a mullioned window.	II
Derby Hall; 53.59310°N 2.29717°W		1850	Designed by Sydney Smirke in Classical style, and housing a number of public buildings, the hall is in ashlar stone with a rusticated ground floor. The right three bays consist of a Corinthian temple-front. It has three arches on the ground floor, three arched windows on the upper floor, above which are three circular niches. To the left is a symmetrical section of two storeys and seven bays. The middle bay contains a doorway with a Venetian window above, all flanked by columns and pilasters, and at the top is a segmental pediment. The other bays contain flat-headed windows on the ground floor and round-headed windows above. At the extreme left is a bay with a doorway and windows.	II
1 Manchester Road; 53.59107°N 2.29958°W	—	c. 1850	A red brick house with a sill band, two storeys and two bays. The doorway in the left bay has a round-arched head, colonnettes, and a fanlight, and the windows are sashes.	II
2–14 Manchester Road and 2 Tenterden Street; 53.59123°N 2.30006°W	—	Mid-19th century	A terrace in red brick with stone dressings, a sill band, an eaves cornice, a blocking course, and corner quoins. There are two storeys, and each unit has two or three bays. Each doorway is recessed with a round arch, and has pilasters, a dentilled cornice, and a fanlight. The windows are sashes, and in each return front is a bay window.	II
The Lea; 53.61742°N 2.29511°W	—	Mid-19th century	A stone house with two storeys and three unequal bays. The doorway has pilasters, a fanlight and a cornice hood, and the windows have been altered.	II
St Paul's Vicarage; 53.59580°N 2.28152°W	—	1851	A stone house with slate roofs in Gothic style. It has two storeys, an irregular plan, and gables of differing sizes. The porch has buttresses and an embattled parapet. The windows are mullioned and transomed with varying details, and with hood moulds.	II
Statue of Sir Robert Peel; 53.59371°N 2.29777°W		1852	The statue of Sir Robert Peel stands in Market Place, and the figure is by E. H. Baily. The monument has a shaped plinth of Aberdeen granite, with a shield and the name "PEEL" on the front, and bronze reliefs on the sides. On the plinth is the standing figure of Peel, also in bronze.	II
2–10 Market Street; 53.59331°N 2.29794°W	—	1850–1860	A row of shops and a bank on a corner site, in ashlar stone, with quoins, and three storeys. The right four bays and the two bays in the return front form the bank that has half-columns on the ground floor and a diagonal doorway on the corner. The rest of the ground floor contains shop fronts with cornices and pediments. On the upper floors are sash windows, those on the middle floor with bracketed cornices, and on the top floor with keystones. At the top is a cornice and a blocking course.	II
12–16 Market Street; 53.59322°N 2.29766°W	—	1850–1860	A row of three shops curving round a corner site. They are in ashlar stone, with three storeys, and each shop has three bays. On the ground floor are shop fronts with rusticated door surrounds between them. The windows are sashes, those on the middle floor having bracketed cornices. At the top is a cornice and a blocking course.	II
Carriage shed at Buckley Wells Locomotive Works; 53.58748°N 2.30435°W	—	1856	The carriage shed was built for the East Lancashire Railway Company. It is in brick and has a roof of Welsh slate with glass panels. There is a single storey, a rectangular plan, and two parallel, unequal ranges with 28 bays. The bays are divided by pilasters, each contains a brick corbel table, above the whole is a continuous frieze with a corbel table, and some bays contain segmental-headed windows.	II
Railings, Bank Street; 53.59258°N 2.30001°W	—	c. 1860 (probable)	The railings at the west end of Bank Street, and flanking the steps down to the railway, are in cast iron, and have sprouting finials and stanchions with pepper-pot finials. They are on a granite plinth, and the gate piers, also in granite, have flat moulded caps.	II
18 and 20 Market Street (The Bank); 53.59299°N 2.29757°W		c. 1860–1870	Originally a branch of the Manchester and District Bank, later a public house, it is in ashlar stone. There are two storeys with a basement, and six bays. The ground floor projects forward, it is rusticated, and contains a doorway with engaged Tuscan columns, and a frieze with roundels and triglyphs. Along the top of the ground floor is a frieze, a cornice, and a balustrade. The windows in the central four windows on the upper floor have segmental pediments on consoles. The wider outer bays have rusticated quoins and contain three-light windows with cornices and central pediments. Above the upper floor is another balustrade.	II
Holy Trinity Church; 53.58894°N 2.28886°W		1863–1865	The church was designed by E. G. Paley in Early English style, it was extended in about 1920, and has since become redundant. The church is in sandstone and has a Welsh slate roof with coped gables and circular cross finials. It consists of nave, a north aisle with a porch, and a chancel with a north Lady chapel and a vestry.	II
Bury Health Authority Offices; 53.59515°N 2.29461°W	—	1865	Originally the Bury Union Offices, the building is in red brick with stone dressings, and an eaves cornice on ornate brackets. There are two storeys and four bays, the central two bays recessed and containing windows on the ground floor with segmental pediments. In the right bay is a round-headed doorway with a rusticated surround and a keystone, and to its right is an archway with a keystone carved as a head. Above the doorway, and above the ground floor window in the left bay, is a cornice.	II
Cemetery Chapel; 53.57897°N 2.29158°W		1866	The chapel is in stone and consists of a nave, a southwest porch, transepts, and a polygonal apse. At the northwest is a tower with a spirelet, decorated with gargoyles, including angels, grotesque faces, bats and crouching beasts. In the north and south sides are rose windows.	II
St Thomas' Church; 53.59247°N 2.28182°W		1866	The church is in stone, and in Early English style. It consists of a nave with a clerestory, north and south aisles, a chancel and a northwest steeple. The steeple has a three-stage tower and a broach spire. The windows are lancets.	II
Bank Chambers; 53.59251°N 2.29933°W	—	1868	Originally the manager's house, later an annexe to Barclays Bank, it is in red brick and stone. It has three storeys and three bays, and has rusticated bands, quoins, and a top cornice and blocking course. The windows on the lower two floors are tall with cornices, and those on the top floor have round-arched heads with keystones.	II
Barclays Bank; 53.59255°N 2.29908°W		1868	The bank, on a corner site, is in ashlar stone with a moulded plinth, rusticated bands on the ground floor, a cornice on brackets and modillions above the upper floor, and at the top is a parapet with sections of balustrading. There are two storeys, five bays on Silver Street and four on Bank Street. The central bay on Silver Street projects slightly, and contains a round-arched entrance with a ribbed surround and a grotesque as a keystone. Above it, the bay is flanked by pilasters and a segmental pediment containing a sculpture. The windows on the upper floor have balconies and shaped hoods on brackets.	II
Castle Armoury; 53.59424°N 2.29861°W		1868	The armoury was built for the 8th Lancashire Rifle Volunteers. and was extended in a similar style in 1907. It is in stone, and mainly in two storeys, with a sill band, a corbel table, and a battlemented parapet. Along the front are two tiers of round-headed windows, arrow slits, and a variety of towers and turrets, one with a round-headed entrance.	II
Cemetery gate piers and gates 53.57756°N 2.29107°W		1869	There are two pairs of gate piers in Gothic style at the entrance to the cemetery, the central pair larger. They are in stone and in the form of elaborately decorated pinnacles, including carved angels holding scrolls. There are double and single gates and railings, all with lancet heads, the railings on stone quadrant walls with peaked coping.	II
Union Buildings; 53.59391°N 2.29648°W		1874	The building, on a corner site, is in red brick with stone dressings, mock timber framing on the upper storeys, and a tiled roof. There are four storeys, a gabled front of three bays, and five bays on the left side. In the left front is a doorway, above which is a coat of arms, a roundel, and a gabled canopy with pierced bargeboards on corbels. The windows vary, and include mullioned windows and oriel windows.	II
Old White Lion; 53.59359°N 2.29851°W		Late 19th century	The public house, which was extended in the 20th century, is in stuccoed brick, and has a double-pitch tile roof with a pyramidal roof lantern. There are three storeys, an attic and cellar, and three bays. On the ground floor is a central doorway with a fanlight, flanked by paired windows over which are arcaded fanlights, and between which are rusticated pilasters. The outer bays of the middle floor contain oriel windows, and between them is a window on an inscribed plinth. On the top floor are three sash windows, with a pediment above the central window, above are two large half-dormers with pediments containing motifs, and between them is a smaller full dormer.	II
Wall, Heaton Grove; 53.57796°N 2.29593°W	—	Late 19th century	A decorative wall in red brick and terracotta, consisting of an arcade of three semicircular arches with square piers. Over the arches is a curved foliate frieze, the spandrels contain shields and foliage, and at the top is a cornice.	II
Canal milestone 10 miles from Manchester; 53.56160°N 2.33494°W		c. 1890	The milestone is on the southeast side of the Manchester, Bolton and Bury Canal, and is in buff sandstone. It has a rectangular cross-section with an arched head, and is about 0.5 metres (1 ft 8 in) in height. On the front is inscribed "M" and "10" in plain incised lettering.	II
Fusilier Museum (formerly Bury School of Arts and Crafts); 53.59244°N 2.29810°W		1893	Originally a technical college, later used for other purposes, it is in Accrington brick with a roof of Westmorland slate, and the main front faced with Cullingworth limestone. The main block has one storey and a basement, and at the rear is a single-storey three-bay extension. The main front has five bays, the central bay projecting and containing a doorway with a swan-neck pediment on console brackets. Above this are sculpted panels, a three-light attic window and a pediment. The outer bays have a rusticated basement, three-light windows and pilasters and panels with relief sculptures. At the top is a moulded cornice and shaped finials.	II
Drinking fountain and horse trough 53.58796°N 2.30146°W		1897	The drinking fountain consists of an arched canopy in Portland stone and in Italianate style. The canopy stands on a white granite plinth, and is carried on four red granite Ionic columns. In the heads of the arches is iron scrollwork, and above is a cornice, a balustrade, and an open arch with a finial. There are basins for dogs, horses, and humans. The structure is ornately decorated, including animals' heads, coats of arms, and inscriptions, including one celebrating the Diamond Jubilee of Queen Victoria.	II
Drinking fountain 53.56702°N 2.29385°W		1898	The drinking fountain commemorates Abraham Barlow, a local alderman. It is in grey Aberdeen granite, about 2.5 metres (8 ft 2 in) tall, and it stands on four sandstone slabs. The fountain consists of a three-stage pier surmounted by a ball finial on a stepped plinth. On the north side is a bowl, a round-arched recess, and a bronze plaque, and on the south side is an inscription.	II
Art Gallery and Library; 53.59181°N 2.29895°W		1899–1901	The building has ashlar stone on the main fronts, and is mainly in two storeys with a basement. The front on Silver Street leads into the library, and has a recessed central three bays containing three arches with a cartouche, a balustrade above, and another balustrade at the top. The outer bays have two bays each, they are pedimented, and have three tiers of columns. On the ground floor are windows, and the upper floor contains friezes containing bas-relief sculpture. The Moss Street front has three bays and a portico leading into the art gallery and museum.	II
15–19 Silver Street and 5 Broad Street; 53.59280°N 2.29858°W	—	1904	The building on a corner site originally housed the Union Bank, shops and the Conservative Club, and it has since been used for other purposes. The building is in ashlar stone with three storeys, five bays on Silver Street, two on Broad Street, and an angled bay on the corner. The corner bay contains an entrance with a shallow segmental arch on corbels, and it rises to form an octagonal tower with a shaped parapet and a pavilion roof. On both fronts there are giant Ionic columns on the upper floors, and the outer bays have shaped segmental pediments flanked by seated figures. The ground floor is rusticated and has wide windows, there are round-arched windows on the middle floor, and sash windows on the top floor.	II
Lancashire Fusiliers Boer War Memorial; 53.58863°N 2.30114°W		1905	The memorial commemorates the soldiers of the Lancashire Fusiliers who were lost in the Boer War. It was designed by George Frampton, and was moved to its present position in 1920. The memorial has a sandstone base and plinth on which stands a bronze statue depicting a soldier standing and holding his rifle in his left hand, and with his right hand raised and holding his busby. On each face of the front is a bronze panel with an Art Nouveau design. Some of the panels contain inscriptions, and the others have the names of those lost in the conflict.	II
Kay Monument; 53.59193°N 2.29719°W		1908	The monument commemorates John Kay, inventor of the flying shuttle, and was designed by William Venn Gough. It is in the form of an octagon with a dome, standing on seven steps, it is 34 feet (10 m) tall, and is in Italianate style. The base is in rusticated sandstone, on which are eight red granite Ionic columns carrying curved pediments. The dome is in Portland stone and is encircled by a balustrade. On the dome and around the balustrade are bronze female figures.	II
Whitehead clock tower 53.58928°N 2.30078°W		1914	Designed by Maxwell and Tuke, the clock tower commemorates Walter Whitehead, a surgeon. It is in Portland stone on a stepped plinth of Aberdeen granite. At the top is a belfry flanked by corner pinnacles, and surmounted by a copper ogee cupola. Below are clock faces, and in the shaft are niches and openings with a statue and carved decorations. At the base is a doorway with an ogee head flanked by bronze plaques.	II
Art Picture House; 53.59156°N 2.29839°W		1921–22	Originally a cinema, later used for other purposes, it is in brick with a steel frame and a white faience frontage, and has a roof of steel and asphalt. The front has three storeys and is symmetrical with nine bays. The interior is richly decorated, and includes a full-height auditorium with a semicircular gallery, boxes, a stage with a semicircular proscenium arch, and a fly tower.	II
Lancashire Fusiliers War Memorial; 53.59226°N 2.29873°W		1922	The memorial was designed by Edwin Lutyens to commemorate the members of the Lancashire Fusiliers who lost their lives in the First World War. It was originally located at Wellington Barracks, and was moved to its present site in 2009. The memorial is in Portland stone and consists of a tapered obelisk on a square base incorporating a moulded cornice, and is 6.9 metres (23 ft) tall. It stands on a rectangular pedestal on a rectangular plinth, all on two circular steps. Flanking the obelisk are regimental flags in painted stone, and it is carved with the regimental badge and a wreath, and there are inscriptions relating to those lost in the First World War and in subsequent campaigns.	II*
Bury War Memorial; 53.59380°N 2.29748°W		1924	The war memorial stands at a junction outside St Mary's Church, and was designed by Reginald Blomfield. It is in Cornish granite and bronze, and consists of a Cross of Sacrifice on an octagonal base. This is flanked by curving walls containing bronze panels with reliefs by Joseph Hermon Cawthra depicting military scenes and wartime scenes at home. On the pedestal is a bronze wreath and an inscription, and at the ends of the walls are carved shields and short inscriptions.	II*
Bury Cemetery War Memorial; 53.57777°N 2.29098°W		1920s	The war memorial stands at the entrance to Bury Cemetery, and its design is based on Sir Reginald Blomfield's Cross of Sacrifice. It is in yellow sandstone, and about 4 metres (13 ft) tall. The memorial is octagonal throughout, and has a base, a plinth, and a cross on which is a bronze sword. On the plinth are inscriptions referring to the First World War.	II
