= The Two Tubs =

Listed pub in Bury, Greater Manchester, England

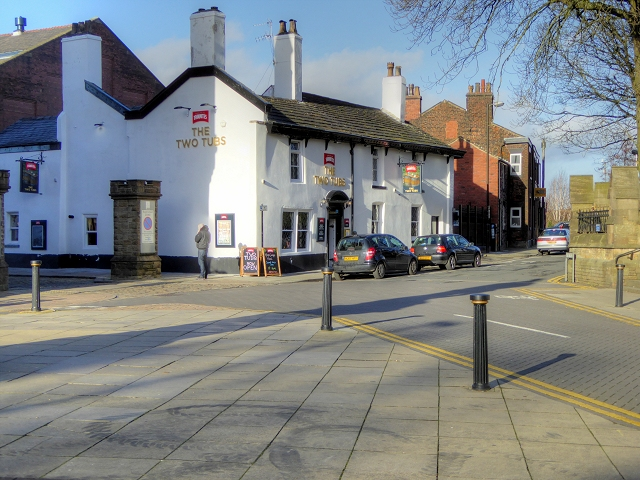
- The pub in 2015

- Location within Greater Manchester
- Former names: Globe Inn
- Alternative names: Two Tubs Inn

General information
- Type: Public house; originally a house
- Location: 19 The Wylde, Bury, Greater Manchester, England
- Coordinates: 53.5940°N 2.2979°W
- Year built: Late 17th century (probable)
- Owner: Thwaites

Design and construction
- Designations

Listed Building – Grade II
- Official name: The Two Tubs Inn
- Designated: 29 January 1985
- Reference no.: 1067224

Website
- twotubsbury.co.uk

The Two Tubs is a Grade II listed public house on The Wylde in Bury, Greater Manchester, England. Probably built in the late 17th century, it was converted from a private residence into a pub in 1806 and was then known as the Globe Inn. Its present name emerged in the early 19th century after the landlord adopted a halved barrel as an improvised pub sign.

== History ==
The building was probably constructed in the late 17th century but is described in its official listing as being "of doubtful age". Its exterior has 19th‑century render over 18th‑century brickwork, which may in turn cover a timber frame dating from the 17th century or earlier. It was converted from a private residence to a public house in 1806.

The establishment was previously known as the Globe Inn and is regarded locally as one of Bury's oldest pubs. In 1830 its landlord created a makeshift pub sign by cutting a barrel into two halves, an idea prompted by rivalry with a nearby inn. The improvised emblem led to the pub becoming known as the Two Tubs, a name that subsequently became established. The 1910 Ordnance Survey map marks the building as an inn, but does not attribute a name.

On 29 January 1985, the Two Tubs Inn was designated a Grade II listed building. It stands opposite the Grade I-listed Church of St Mary the Virgin, and lies a short distance from the Grade II-listed Peel Memorial on Market Place. As of 2026 the pub is owned by Thwaites Brewery.

== Architecture ==
The building's front is finished with 19th‑century render applied over earlier brickwork from the 18th century, which may conceal an older timber structure. It has two storeys. The front contains three sash windows, with the lower left formed as a wider pair. A doorway stands to the right of these, set beneath an early 19th‑century canopy carried on slender classical columns and positioned in front of a chimney. At the far right is a boarded door with a small remnant of Tudor‑style leadwork. Two small sliding sashes are set in the left gable. A metal water spout is dated "IBM 1747", likely recording the initials of individuals associated with the building at that date. The roof is made of stone slabs, and the chimneys are tall, including those on the gables.

== See also ==
- Listed buildings in Bury
- Listed pubs in Greater Manchester
