= Derby Hall =

The term Derby Hall may refer to:

- The Derby Hall (Bury), a Victorian neo-classical building in Bury, Greater Manchester, England
- Derby Hall (University of Nottingham), a student residence at the University of Nottingham, England
