= The Bank, Bury =

Listed pub in Greater Manchester, England

The Bank
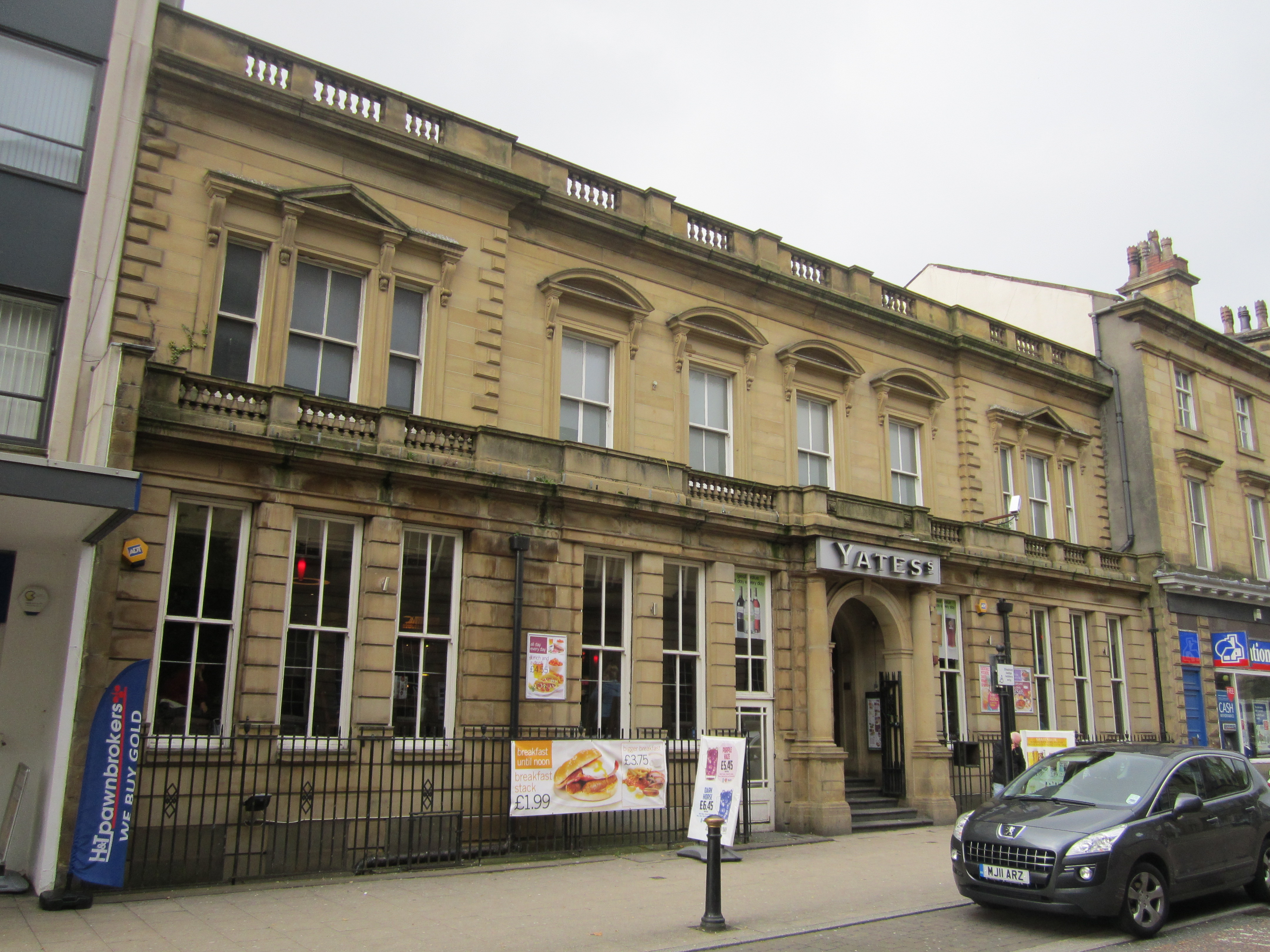
- The pub, then a Yates's establishment, in 2012

- Location within Greater Manchester
- Former names: Manchester and District Bank, Yates's

General information
- Status: Converted into a public house
- Type: Bank (former)
- Location: 18–20 Market Street, Bury, Greater Manchester, England
- Coordinates: 53.5930°N 2.2976°W
- Year built: c. 1860–1870; 156 years ago
- Renovated: 2013 (refurbished)
- Client: Manchester and District Bank
- Owner: Stonegate

Design and construction
- Designations

Listed Building – Grade II
- Official name: 18 and 20, Market Street
- Designated: 20 September 1974
- Reference no.: 1067240

Website
- Official website

The Bank (officially listed as 18 and 20 Market Street) is a Grade II listed public house on Market Street in Bury, Greater Manchester, England. Built around 1860–1870 as a branch of the Manchester and District Bank, it continued to appear as a bank on early 20th‑century Ordnance Survey maps. The building became part of the Bury Town Centre conservation area in 1978. It reopened in 2019 as The Bank after previously operating within the Yates's chain.

== History ==
The building was constructed around 1860–1870, according to its official listing, as a branch of the Manchester and District Bank on land owned at the time by the Earl of Derby. The 1910 and 1939 Ordnance Survey maps mark the building as a bank.

On 20 September 1974, the building was designated a Grade II listed structure, recorded under its address of 18 and 20 Market Street, and in 1978 the site was included within the newly established Bury Town Centre conservation area. The Bank stands directly opposite Derby Hall, which is also Grade II listed.

In 2013 the pub underwent refurbishment works. In November 2019, the pub reopened as The Bank, having previously operated as part of the Yates's chain. As of December 2023, the pub's freehold was owned by Stonegate.

== Architecture ==
The building has a symmetrical classical frontage typical of a 19th‑century bank. It is built of ashlar stone and has two storeys above a basement. The front has six windows, with the outer bays projecting slightly and containing three‑part windows. The four central first‑floor windows have shallow curved pediments on brackets, while the tripartite windows have cornices with a pediment over the middle section. The ground floor projects forward and has horizontal stonework that is likely a 20th‑century alteration.

The main doorway has attached Tuscan columns and a frieze with roundels and triglyphs, with a balcony above. A frieze and cornice run across the rest of the ground floor, and the first‑floor windows have a balustraded balcony with decorative panels. Modern railings enclose the basement area.

== See also ==
- Listed buildings in Bury
- Listed pubs in Greater Manchester
