= St Paul's Church, Bury =

Coordinates: 53.5960°N 2.2829°W

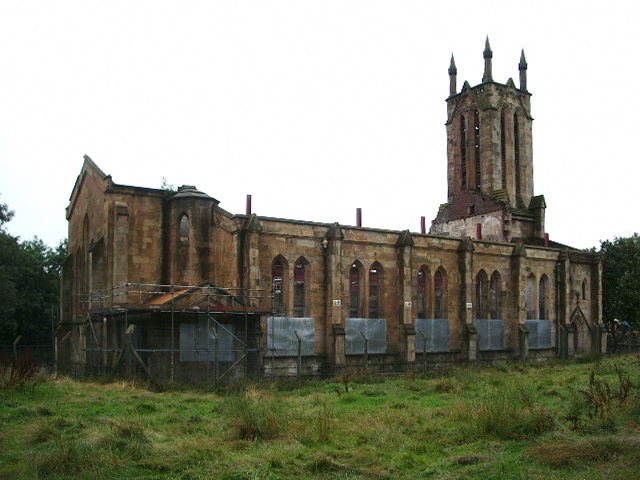
- St Paul's Church, Bury, after the fire, before conversion

- Location in Greater Manchester
- OS grid reference: SD 814 111
- Location: Church Street, Bury, Greater Manchester
- Country: England
- Denomination: Anglican

History
- Status: Former parish church

Architecture
- Functional status: Redundant
- Heritage designation: Grade II
- Designated: 29 January 1985
- Architect(s): John Harper; Austin and Paley (alterations)
- Architectural type: Church
- Style: Gothic Revival
- Groundbreaking: 1838

Specifications
- Materials: Sandstone

St Paul's Church is in Church Street, Bury, Greater Manchester, England. A former Anglican parish church, it is now redundant and, following fire damage, has been converted into residential use. The former church is recorded in the National Heritage List for England as a designated Grade II listed building.

== History ==
The church was built in 1838–42, and designed by John Harper of York. The land for the church was given by the 13th Earl of Derby. In 1898 the Lancaster architects Austin and Paley carried out work on the church, including removing the galleries, repairing the roof, and installing new choir stalls and a font. On 1 November 1995 the church was declared redundant. It was damaged by fire in 2004, and has since been converted for residential use.

== Architecture ==
St Paul's is constructed in sandstone in 13th-century Gothic Revival style. Its plan consists of a nave with a clerestory, north and south aisles, a chancel and a west tower. The windows along the sides of the church, and in the tower, are lancets. In the Buildings of England series, the authors describe the pinnacles on the tower as "like apologetic eyebrows".

== External features ==
The churchyard contains the war graves of thirteen soldiers of World War I and an airman of World War II. In 2006 a commemorative memorial erected by the Commonwealth War Graves Commission was temporarily stored away from the church until the conversion of the building into apartments was completed.

== See also ==
- Listed buildings in Bury
- List of ecclesiastical works by Austin and Paley (1895–1914)
