= Lower Chesham =

Listed building in Bury, Greater Manchester, England

- Location within Greater Manchester
- Alternative names: Lower Chesham Hall

General information
- Location: Bell Lane, Bury, Greater Manchester, England
- Coordinates: 53.5985°N 2.2808°W
- Year built: 1713; 313 years ago

Listed Building – Grade II*
- Official name: Lower Chesham
- Designated: 26 May 1976
- Reference no.: 1067281

Lower Chesham, also known as Lower Chesham Hall, is a Grade II* listed historic building on Bell Lane in Bury, Greater Manchester, England. Built in 1713 by Richard Kay of Baldingstone, it replaced an earlier timber‑framed house on the site and later became associated with Bury's expanding textile economy. Part of the hall was sold to the church in 1920 and converted into St Paul's Institute Church Hall, while other sections were subsequently adapted for use as care facilities. The building was added to Historic England's Heritage at Risk Register in 2018, but following repair proposals and conservation work it was removed from the register in 2025.

== History ==
Lower Chesham Hall was constructed in 1713 by Richard Kay of Baldingstone, a cousin of John Kay, the inventor of the flying shuttle, a key innovation in the textile industry during the Industrial Revolution. The hall replaced an earlier timbered house known as Chesham Fold, which was demolished the same year. Some timbers from the old house were reused in the first dissenting chapel in Bury.

During the 19th and early 20th centuries, the hall was associated with Bury's growing prosperity linked to textile manufacturing. In 1920 part of the building was sold to the church and converted into St Paul's Institute Church Hall, which served as a community hub with facilities for sports and parish events. Later, part of the hall facing Chesham Crescent was converted into a modern care home, and other sections of the property were also used for care facilities.

On 26 May 1976, Lower Chesham was designated a Grade II* listed building.

== Architecture ==
Lower Chesham Hall is built in a 17th-century style despite its early 18th-century construction date. The structure is made of coursed squared sandstone, with mullioned and transomed windows. It is three storeys in height, featuring string courses, a cornice, and a stone slab roof with coped gables topped by ball finials. Internally, the hall is reputed to contain a fine staircase, decorated plaster ceilings, and leaded mullioned stair windows.

== Heritage at Risk Register ==
In 2018 the hall was listed on Historic England's Heritage at Risk Register, with its condition rated as "fair". The owner proposed funding essential repairs, such as fixing chimneys, the roof, pointing, lead work, gutters, windows, and doors, along with internal redecoration to address damp and decay, through a "cross-funding" scheme involving the construction of three new homes on part of the site. In 2025 Lower Chesham Hall was removed from the register.

== See also ==
- Grade II* listed buildings in Greater Manchester
- Listed buildings in Bury
