= Bury War Memorial =

War memorial in Greater Manchester, England

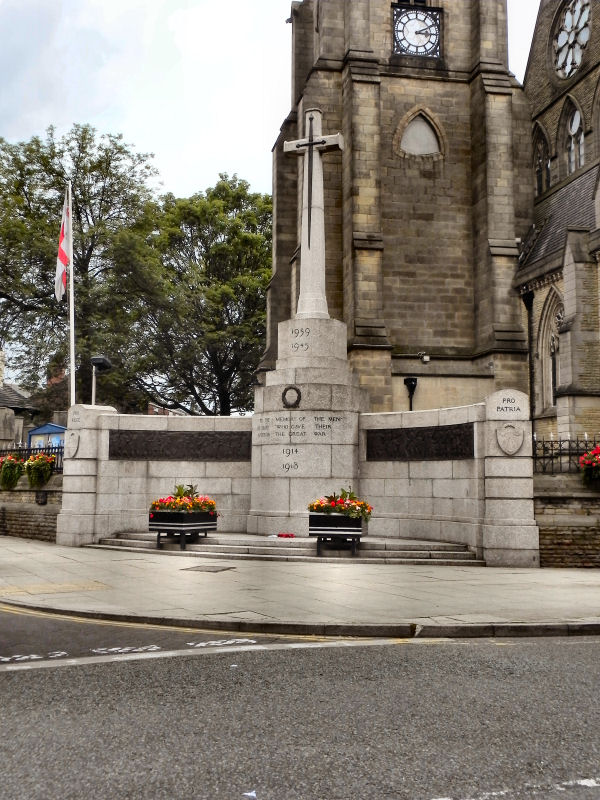
- The war memorial in 2010

- Location within Greater Manchester

General information
- Location: The Rock, Bury, Greater Manchester, England
- Coordinates: 53.5938°N 2.2975°W
- Year built: 1924; 102 years ago

Technical details
- Material: Portland stone

Design and construction
- Architect: Sir Reginald Blomfield
- Other designers: Joseph Hermon Cawthra (sculptor)
- Main contractor: William Kirkpatrick Ltd.

Listed Building – Grade II*
- Official name: Bury War Memorial
- Designated: 7 April 2017
- Reference no.: 1444845

Bury War Memorial is a Grade II* listed monument at the corner of Market Place and The Rock, outside the Parish Church of St Mary in Bury, Greater Manchester, England. It was unveiled on 11 November 1924 by the Earl of Derby to commemorate those who died during the First World War, and it was later updated to include those who died during the Second World War.

== History ==
Discussions about creating a war memorial in Bury began shortly after the end of the First World War. The town's principal commemorative initiative was the establishment of a children's wing at Bury Infirmary, a scheme that attracted widespread support and aimed to raise more than £50,000. The proposal to erect a monument initially received less enthusiasm than the hospital project, partly because other memorials were already appearing locally, such as the one outside the Lancashire Fusiliers' headquarters at Wellington Barracks. However, an anonymous donor resolved any hesitation by contributing £1,000 on the condition that the memorial be sited in the Market Place.

The land for the memorial was donated by the Parish Church of St Mary, which contains many memorials to the Lancashire Fusiliers, at the corner of its grounds.

The memorial was commissioned by the Bury War Memorial Committee and was unveiled on 11 November 1924 by the Earl of Derby at a ceremony also attended by the Suffragan Bishop of Hulme. After the Second World War, additional inscriptions were added to commemorate those who lost their lives between 1939 and 1945.

On 7 April 2017, Bury War Memorial was designated a Grade II* listed building for its architectural and historic significance.

== Location ==
The memorial stands prominently outside the Parish Church of St Mary, at the junction of The Rock and Market Place, making it a central landmark in Bury town centre.

== Design and architecture ==
The memorial was designed by Sir Reginald Blomfield, a renowned architect responsible for many war memorials, and sculpted by Joseph Hermon Cawthra. At its centre stands a Cross of Sacrifice carved from Portland stone, rising from an octagonal pedestal. Behind the cross is a curved stone wall that bears two large bronze relief panels, each with symbolic detail.

The left panel depicts members of the armed forces alongside a nurse, with soldiers carrying a stretcher, representing the front-line sacrifices of war. In contrast, the right panel illustrates the Home front, showing figures engaged in coal mining, engineering, carpentry, and munitions work, highlighting the vital civilian contribution to the war effort.

Inscriptions on the memorial include the Latin phrases "PRO REGE" and "PRO PATRIA" at the ends of the wall, meaning "For the King" and "For the Country." The central dedication reads: "TO THE MEMORY OF THE MEN OF BURY WHO GAVE THEIR LIVES IN THE GREAT WAR 1914–1918", later supplemented with "1939–1945" to honour those who died during the Second World War.

The bronze panels were exhibited at the Royal Academy before installation, an event noted in contemporary coverage.

== Gallery ==
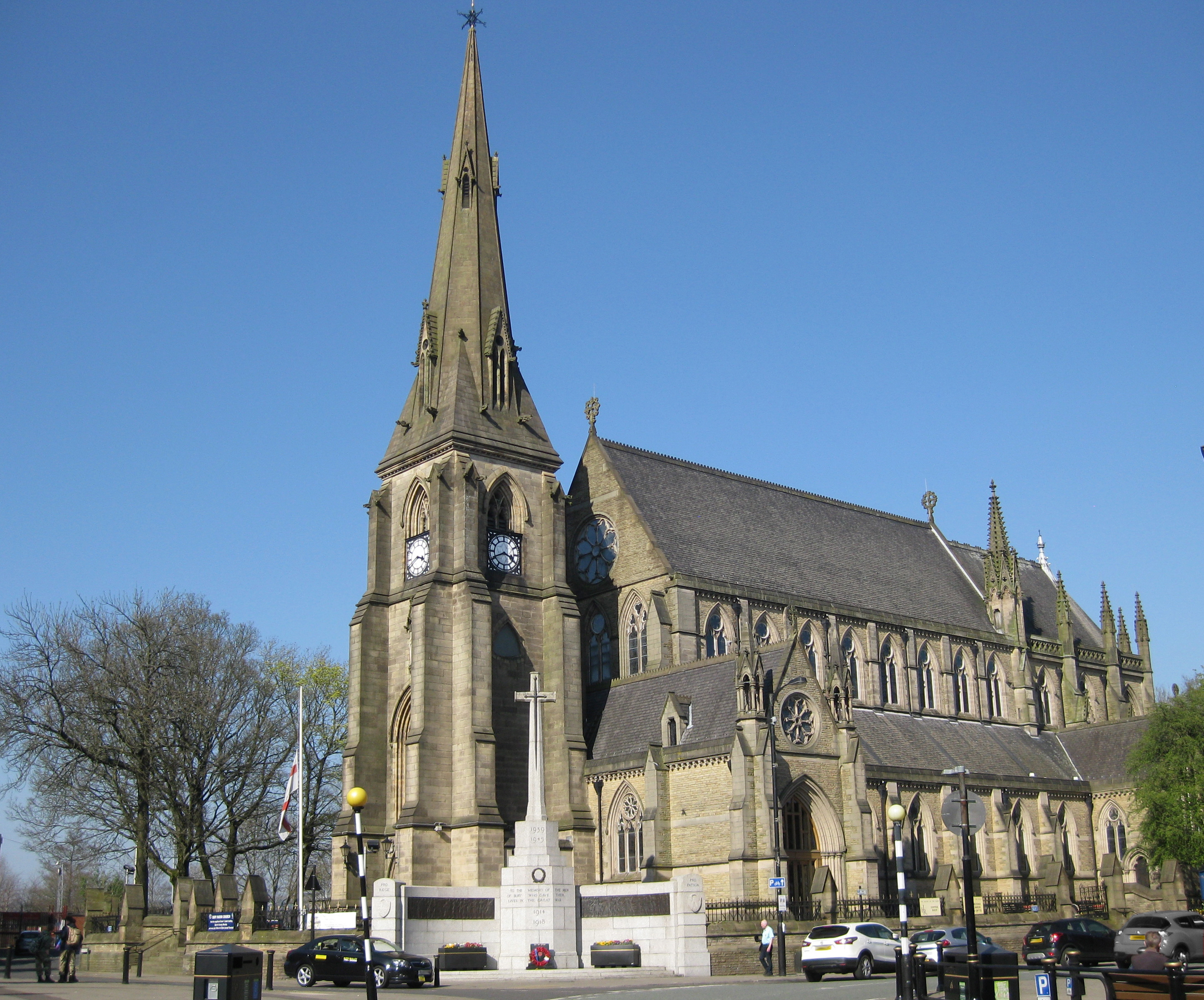
The memorial outside the Parish Church of St Mary

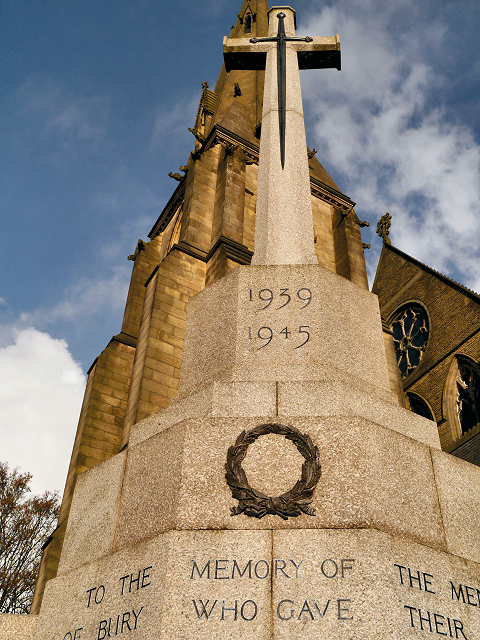
Cross of Sacrifice

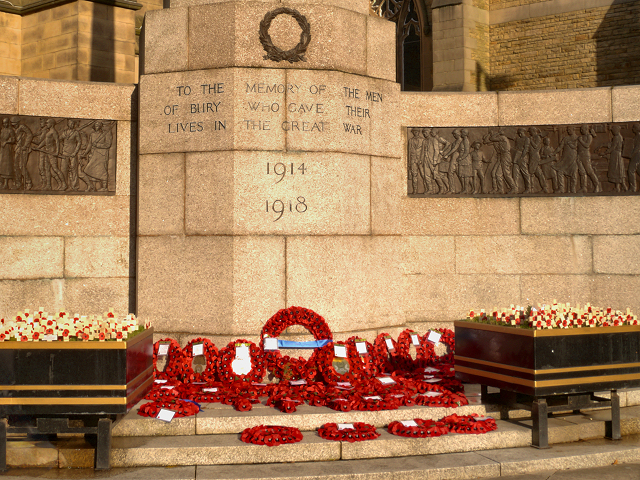
Inscriptions on the memorial

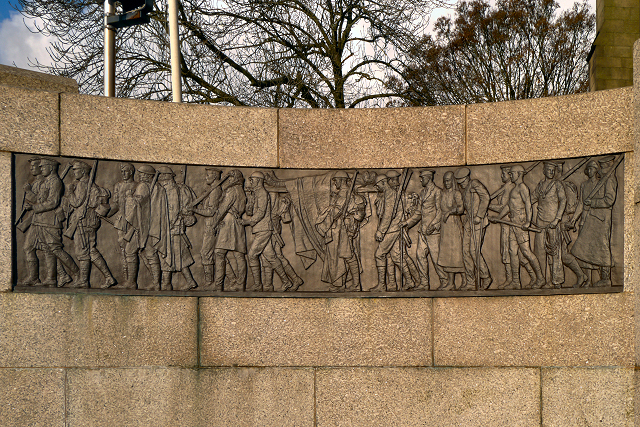
Left bronze relief panel

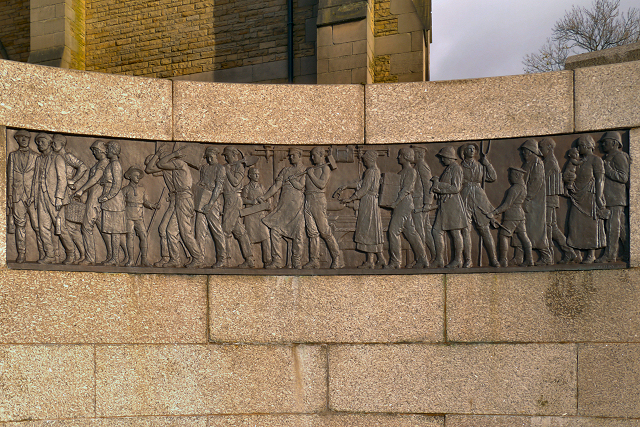
Right bronze relief panel

== See also ==
- Grade II* listed buildings in Greater Manchester
- Lancashire Fusiliers War Memorial
- Listed buildings in Bury
