= St Marie's Church, Bury =

St Marie's Church
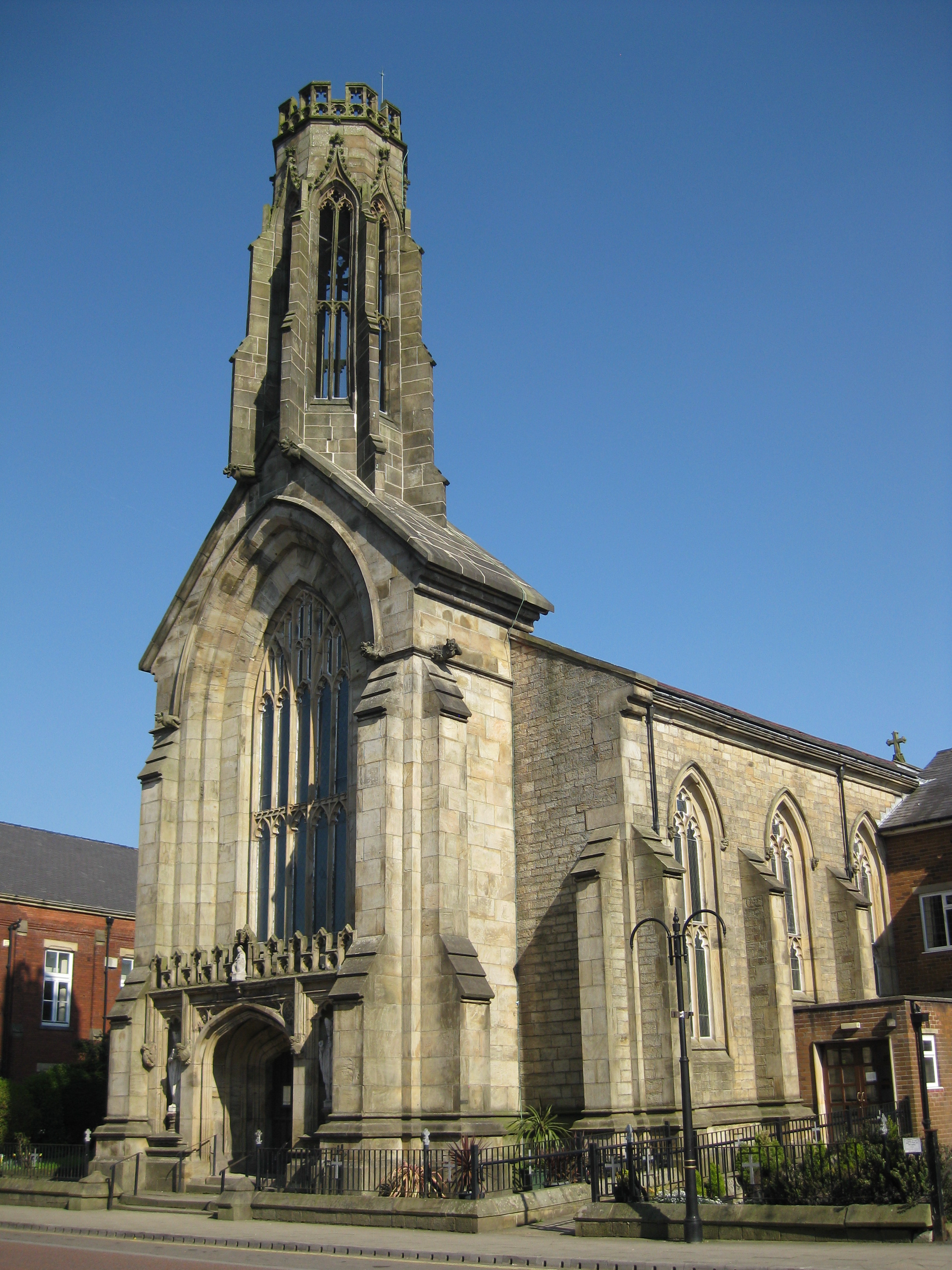
- St Marie's Church
- 53.5912°N 2.2992°W
- OS grid reference: SD 80289 10553
- Location: Bury
- Country: England
- Denomination: Roman Catholic
- Website: stmarieandstjosephbury.org.uk/

History
- Status: Parish church
- Founded: 1825
- Dedication: Mary, mother of Jesus

Architecture
- Functional status: Active
- Heritage designation: Grade II listed
- Designated: 10 November 1951
- Architect: John Harper
- Style: Gothic Revival
- Groundbreaking: 1841
- Completed: 1842

Administration
- Province: Liverpool
- Diocese: Salford
- Deanery: Rochdale, Bury
- Parish: St Marie and St Joseph

St Marie's Church is a Roman Catholic parish church in Bury, Greater Manchester, England. It was built from 1841 to 1842 in the Gothic Revival style. It is situated between the Manchester Road and Back Knowsley Street in the town centre. It is a Grade II listed building.

== History ==
=== Foundation ===
After the Reformation, a priest would come from Rochdale to serve the local Catholic population of Bury. In 1825, a mission was started in Bury and the first priest was a Fr Peacock. He would celebrate Mass in Bury as well as travel to Heywood, Radcliffe, Elton and Tottington to serve the Catholic communities there.

=== Construction ===
In 1841, the architect John Harper from York was commissioned to design the church and presbytery. Construction started that year, and the next year, 1842, the church was opened. With the increasing population of the town and the surrounding area, more missions were started from the church. New churches would be constructed resulting from these missions such as St Joseph's Church in Bury.

== Parish ==
In 2009, the parishes of St Marie's Church and St Joseph's Church were merged. St Marie's Church has one Sunday Mass at 11:30am and St Joseph's Church has two Sunday Masses at 5:00pm on Saturday and at 9:15am on Sunday.

== Exterior ==
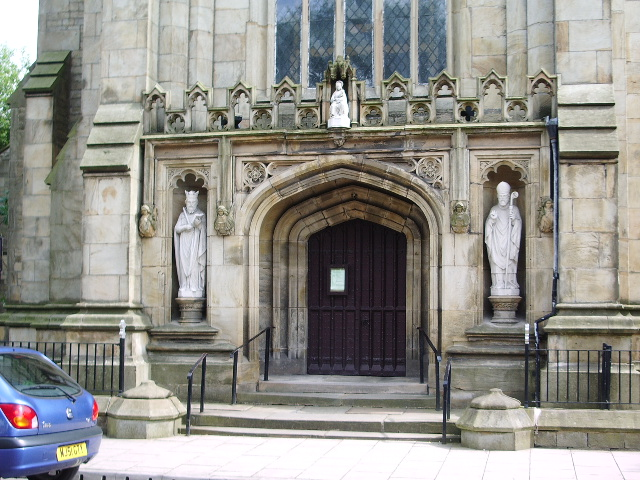
Main entrance

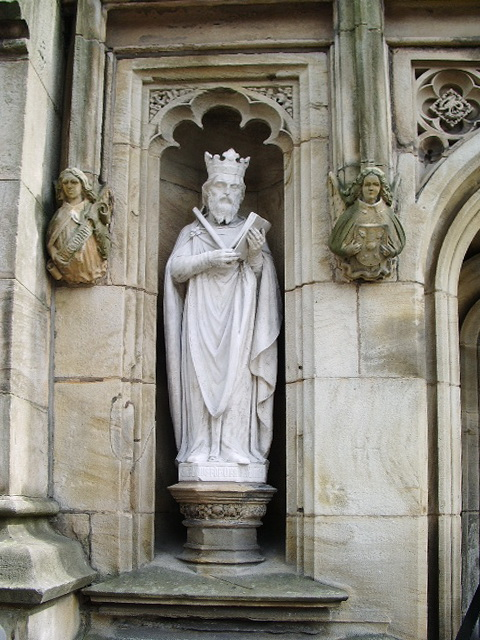
Left statue

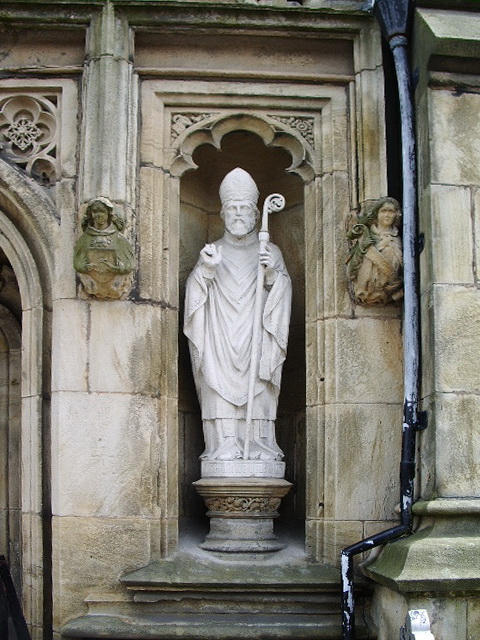
Right statue

== See also ==
- Listed buildings in Bury
- Diocese of Salford
- Media related to St Marie's Church, Bury at Wikimedia Commons
