= The Met (arts centre) =

Performing arts venue in Bury, England

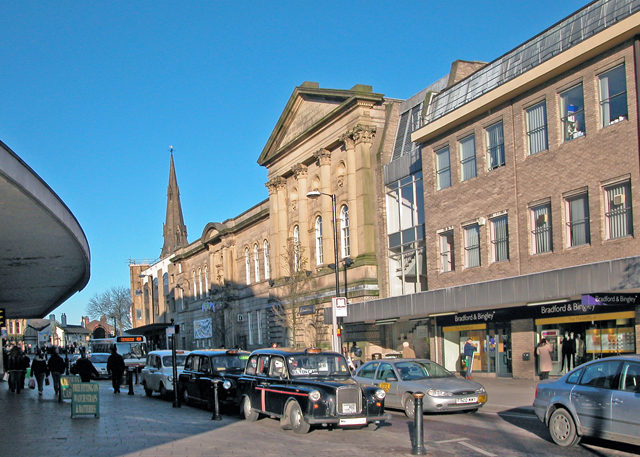
- The Derby Hall in Bury, home of The Met
- Interactive map of The Met
- Address: Market Street, Bury
- Coordinates: 53.5929°N 2.2970°W
- Capacity: Derby Hall: 400; The Box: 100
- Type: Arts Centre

Construction
- Opened: 1980

Website
- themet.biz

The Met (popularly known as Bury Met) is a performing arts venue in Bury, Greater Manchester, England. It consists of two theatre spaces (Derby Hall and The Box), as well as the Edwin Street recording studio. There is also a café bar that provides refreshments.

The centre is operated by Bury Metropolitan Arts Association, a registered charity.

== Location ==
The Met is situated in the Derby Hall, a large Victorian classical building on Market Street in the centre of Bury.

== Programme ==
The Met houses a busy programme of events which includes theatre shows, many varieties of music, and stand up comedy.

== History ==
Bury Metropolitan Arts Association was founded in 1975. The association originally operated out of a disused bank building at 2 The Rock, promoting events in civic halls and parish churches. It moved into the Derby Hall in 1979.

The organisation's founding Director was Dewi Lewis, who went on to found Manchester's Cornerhouse arts centre.
