= The White Lion, St Albans =

Pub in St. Albans, Hertfordshire, England

Coordinates: 51.7481°N 0.3373°W

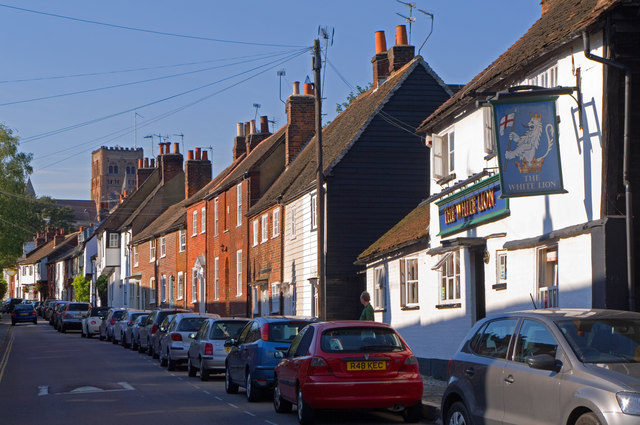
White Lion, Sopwell Lane

The White Lion is a public house in St Albans, Hertfordshire, England. In 2015 the pub was owned by Punch Taverns.

== Architecture ==
The building is said to date from the end of the sixteenth century. It is timber framed with a slightly jettied first floor, although the timber-framing is not evident from the street as it has been refaced. It is listed Grade II with Historic England.
