= Peter Walker (sculptor) =

British sculptor (born 1974)

Peter Walker (born 1973, Staffordshire) is a contemporary British sculptor and multi-disciplinary artist whose work explores humanity, identity, memory and resilience through public art, monumental bronze, sculpture and immersive installation. His work consists of large-scale sculpture, commissioned and bespoke sculptural works, paintings, drawings, and large-scale installations. His projects range from nationally significant memorials and public commissions to large-scale suspended installations and community engaged artworks that have involved thousands of participants. Walker is a fellow of the Royal Society of British Artists and a member of the Royal Society of Sculptors.

Walker has created many sculptures around the UK, as well as work for private and corporate collectors. Permanent works usually in bronze or steel. His work can be found in public and private collections internationally, including at the British embassies in Dubai and Paris, and the collections of Limburg an der Lahn (Germany), St Chads Cathedral (Canada), The National Memorial Arboretum, Staffordshire, Chester Cathedral, Lichfield Cathedral, and University Church in Oxford.

Walker is also the lead artist and artistic director of Luxmuralis, creating art through son-et-lumière (large-scale projection). Luxmuralis work has been shown at the Tower of London, Westminster Abbey, Chatsworth House, Compton Verney, Bodleian Libraries Old Quad, widely across the UK cathedral network, Ireland, and in the USA at the Cathedral of St Paul, Minnesota,and Washington DC National Cathedral.

== Works ==
=== Selected sculptures ===
- Pity of War (2024) is the national memorial for civilian victims affected by war and conflict. The statue honours all the nameless, voiceless, and forgotten individuals affected by war and conflict. The two-metre high bronze sculpture is permanently sited at the National Memorial Arboretum in Staffordshire. The Pity of War charity was set up to raise awareness of the impact of war on civilians, through the creation of this memorial and further outreach through an educational programme. The maquette of the sculpture has been on tour around the UK, already seen at locations such as Portsmouth (Museum of the Royal Navy), many English cathedrals, and venues in Hay on Wye, and London. The Pity of War maquette is now permanently in collections at the British embassies in Paris and Dubai, at the Basilica of St Mary in Minnesota USA, and in the UK at Chester Cathedral, Sheffield Cathedral, Liverpool Cathedral, Winchester Cathedral, Oxford University Church and at Europaplatz in Limburg an Der Lahn, Germany.
- Shirebrook Mining Memorial (2023). The Shirebrook Colliery memorial is a statue to represent the mining community and heritage of Shirebrook and stands in the market square of Shirebrook, Derbyshire.
- Connection (2022). Inspired by Michelangelo's Creation of Adam, it consists of two giant female hands, each two metres tall.
- Saint Chad (2021) Lichfield Cathedral commissioned this new public sculpture of Lichfield’s patron saint.
- Peace Woodland (2018) - 1918 trees were planted as a living artwork to commemorate the Armistice, a labyrinth of British native trees with a central cedar tree and a bronze plaque with hundreds of names dedicated to Peace in the centre.
- Industrial Symphony (2013) Bronze statue in Llanelli east gate cultural quarter, pays tribute to the Tin plate workers.
- Miner and Pony (Scamp) statue (2013) Bronze statue of a miner and pity pony honouring the heritage of Burntwood.
- E Conchis Omnia Bronze statue of Erasmus Darwin (2012) founding member of the Lunar Society, philanthropist, inventor, poet and physician, sited at Beacon Park, Lichfield.
- The Formation of Poetry (2010) Bronze sculpture, a tribute to the work of Dr Samuel Johnson, sited at Greenhill Mews, Lichfield.
- Sir Eric Evans MBE (2009) Bronze statue stands near Aldwinians Rugby Union Football Club, Tameside.
- Moravian Woman and child (2009) Bronze statue paying homage to the last Moravian settlement in England, sited in Fairfield.
- Izaac Walton (2000) Stafford born author of the Complete Angler, this Bronze statue stands on the river Sow at Victoria Park Stafford.

=== Selected installations ===
- Peace Doves - a mass participation project that culminates in the creation of a large-scale hanging art installation, lit and set to music by David Harper. Participants write a message of peace on a paper dove which joins thousands that hang in the installation. Thousands of school children and members of community groups are invited to participate with the goal of also creating their own artworks at their own school and community group settings.
- Identity - exhibited at The Old Royal Naval College (2025-2026) and We Are All Together exhibition. at Liverpool Cathedral in 2022, the work is made up of seven 25m high columns using colour, texture, form, light and sound. Each column appears symbolic of the DNA structure within all of us.
- The Light of Hope Star is a huge illuminated five metre diameter steel piece, created to unify and to represent hope. It is a touring exhibit that went to Exeter Cathedral, Winchester Cathedral, and Lichfield Cathedral.
- The Laboratory - a highly detailed physical conceptual installation capturing a scientists workspace. exhibited in the Great Exhibition 2021, Lichfield Cathedral.
- Buttons - A highly symbolic installation featuring a massive floor mosaic of hundreds of thousands of buttons, each representing a life.
- Hidden - Art installation hosted by St Peter Manscroft, Norwich utilising light, fabric and architecture to reveal or obscure unseen spaces.

=== Luxmuralis ===
Luxmuralis is an artistic collaboration creating large scale, immersive light and sound installations. Peter Walker creates the visual projection artworks and David Harper the Composer creates the atmospheric soundscapes, together with a team of technical and production experts Luxmuralis takes artworks to unusual spaces and iconic landmarks across the UK and abroad. It was developed from the concept of son et lumière.

=== Other works ===
- Crown and Coronation, Tower of London 2023, followed by UK-wide tour 2024.
- Poppy Fields, Canterbury Cathedral, Gloucester Cathedral, Chester Cathedral, Winchester Cathedral, Lichfield Cathedral, St Albans Cathedral, Guildford Cathedral, Christ Church Oxford, Stafford Shire Hall.
- Space, Southwell Minster, Hull Minster, St Martin in the Fields, London, Bristol Cathedral, Liverpool Cathedral, Worcester Cathedral, Carlisle Cathedral, Durham Cathedral, Leicester Cathedral, Truro Cathedral, Wells Cathedral, Exeter Cathedral, Portsmouth Cathedral, St Bees Priory, Hereford Cathedral, Lichfield Cathedral,
- The Light Before Christmas: The Angels are Coming! Liverpool Cathedral (2022), The Manger (2023), Starlight (2024), The Gift (2025).
- Renaissance, Canterbury Cathedral (2023) as part of Canterbury Festival, Exeter Cathedral, St Albans, University Church of St Mary the Virgin.
- City of Light, and The Light District at Carlisle Castle and Cathedral (2020,2021,2022,2023, 2024)
