= White Lion, Covent Garden =

Pub in Covent Garden, London

Coordinates: 51.51281°N 0.12387°W

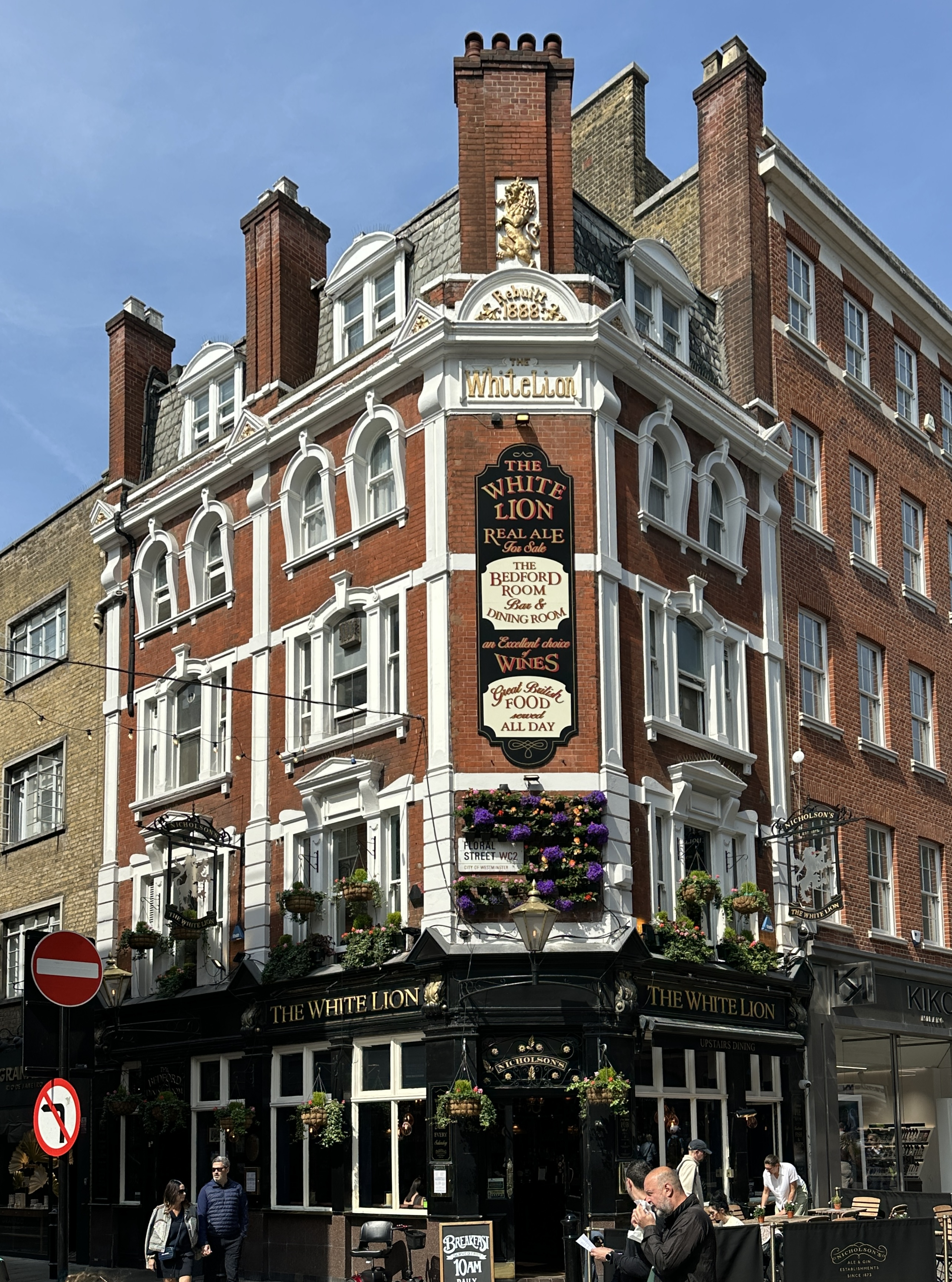
The White Lion, 2026

The White Lion is a pub in Covent Garden, London, on the corner of James Street and Floral Street.

There has been a pub called the White Lion on the site since at least 1839, and the current pub was rebuilt in 1888, as can be seen under the rampant lion at the top of the building.

The White Lion Group, a radical political group in the 1820s and 1830s, with members including Dr. Watson and John Gale Jones, was named after the pub, as that had been their first meeting place.

The White Lion was once used just by market traders and local people, but is now used mainly by tourists, office workers and opera goers.

The pub is part of the Nicholson's pub chain.
