= Old White Lion, Bury =

Listed pub in Greater Manchester, England

Old White Lion
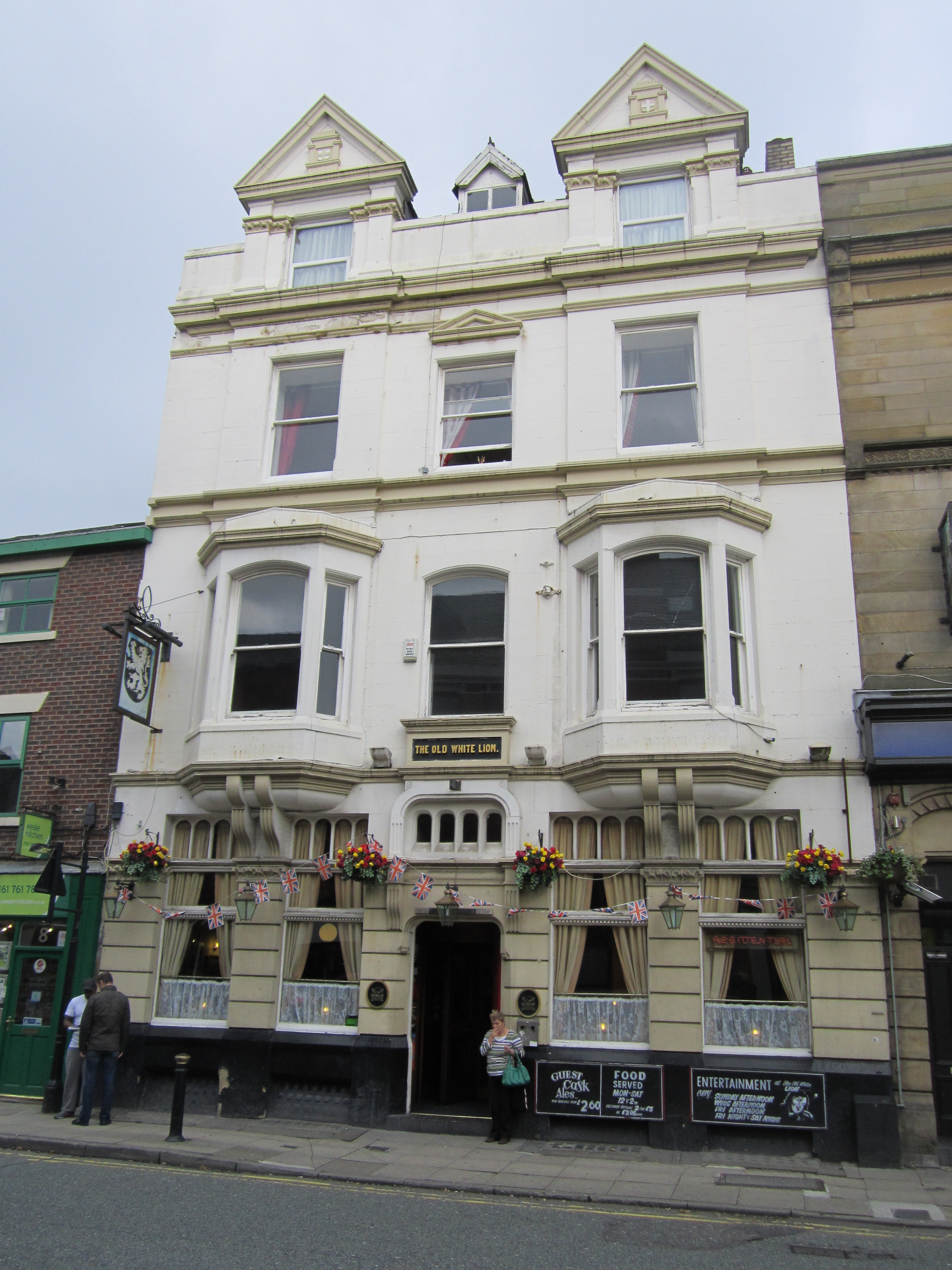
- The pub in 2012

- Location within Greater Manchester
- Former names: Old White Lion Hotel

General information
- Type: Public house
- Location: 6 Bolton Street, Bury, Greater Manchester, England
- Coordinates: 53.5936°N 2.2988°W
- Year built: Late 19th century
- Renovated: Mid-20th century (extended)
- Owner: Stonegate

Design and construction
- Designations

Listed Building – Grade II
- Official name: Old White Lion
- Designated: 28 March 2019
- Reference no.: 1460925

Website
- Official website

The Old White Lion is a Grade II listed public house on Bolton Street in Bury, Greater Manchester, England. Built in the late 19th century on the site of an earlier inn, it later became part of Crown Brewery and subsequently Whitbread. The pub retains a historically significant interior recognised by the Campaign for Real Ale (CAMRA) and continues to operate under Craft Union.

== History ==
A public house has stood on this plot since at least the mid‑19th century. The 1849 town plan shows an inn named the Old White Lion on the site, laid out on an irregular footprint. The present building was constructed in the late 19th century and reopened as the Old White Lion Hotel. A rear extension was added in the mid-20th century.

In 1925 the business passed to Crown Brewery of Bury, which later became part of Whitbread. The property was eventually sold on by Whitbread.

It was included on the Campaign for Real Ale (CAMRA)'s National Inventory of Historic Pub Interiors before the inventory's grading system was revised. Under the revised scheme, it is rated three stars and its interior is regarded as being "of outstanding national historic importance".

On 28 March 2019, the Old White Lion was designated a Grade II listed building. As of August 2025, the pub was operated by Craft Union, a brand of Stonegate.

== Architecture ==
=== Exterior ===
The building is constructed in brick with a stucco exterior, and is of three storeys with an attic and a cellar. Its front has three windows and a low wall at the roofline, with simple horizontal bands marking each level. The outer windows stand slightly forward. The entrance sits in the centre, set back under an arched feature, and is flanked by matching paired windows. Decorative posts and lamps separate the ground‑floor openings.

On the first floor, the outer bays each have a projecting window, and all openings use two‑pane sashes. A sign sits below the central first‑floor window, and the window above it has a small decorative top. The attic includes one full dormer in the middle and broader half‑dormers to either side, each with bold surrounds and carved motifs.

The rear is brick, with a later single‑storey addition and stepped upper floors. Each of the top two levels has three openings with curved brick heads. Most windows are two‑over‑two sashes, though one on each floor has been replaced by a fire exit with metal escape structures. The exposed west side has very few openings.

=== Interior ===
The ground floor is arranged as a mostly open bar at the front, with two enclosed rooms and a later rear extension behind. Entry is through a small lobby with an early revolving door, leading into a space with a curved bar, fixed seating, and decorative ceilings. Two rear rooms open off a short corridor; each has etched‑glass doors, and one contains timber panelling, a prominent fireplace, stained glass, and patterned plasterwork. The other, now used for pool, has a large stained‑glass window partly obscured by a later ceiling.

A staircase beside the bar rises through a square stairwell lit from above. It has carved timber features at ground level and a cantilevered timber stair with turned balusters on the upper flights. Later glazed partitions and fire doors enclose the landings, but some original four‑panelled doors survive.

The first floor contains two function rooms and a later bar, with surviving features such as moulded coving, panelling, and built‑in cupboards. Above are further rooms, including second‑floor bedrooms and an attic flat for the manager.

== See also ==
- Listed buildings in Bury
- Listed pubs in Greater Manchester
