= Peel Memorial, Bury =

Statue in Greater Manchester, England

Coordinates: 53°35′37.3″N 02°17′52.0″W

Peel Memorial
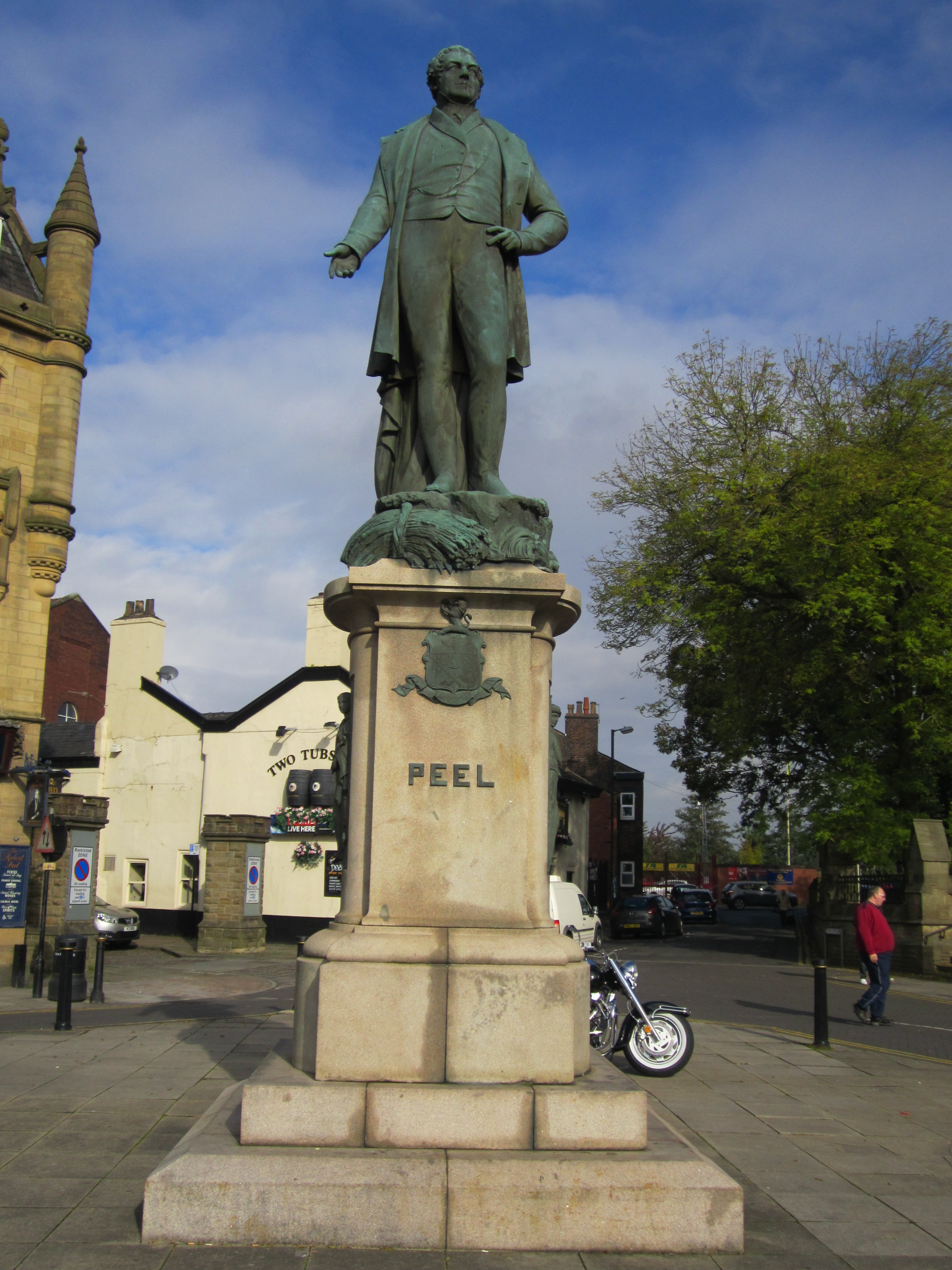
- Artist: Edward Hodges Baily
- Year: 1851
- Location: Bury, Greater Manchester, England

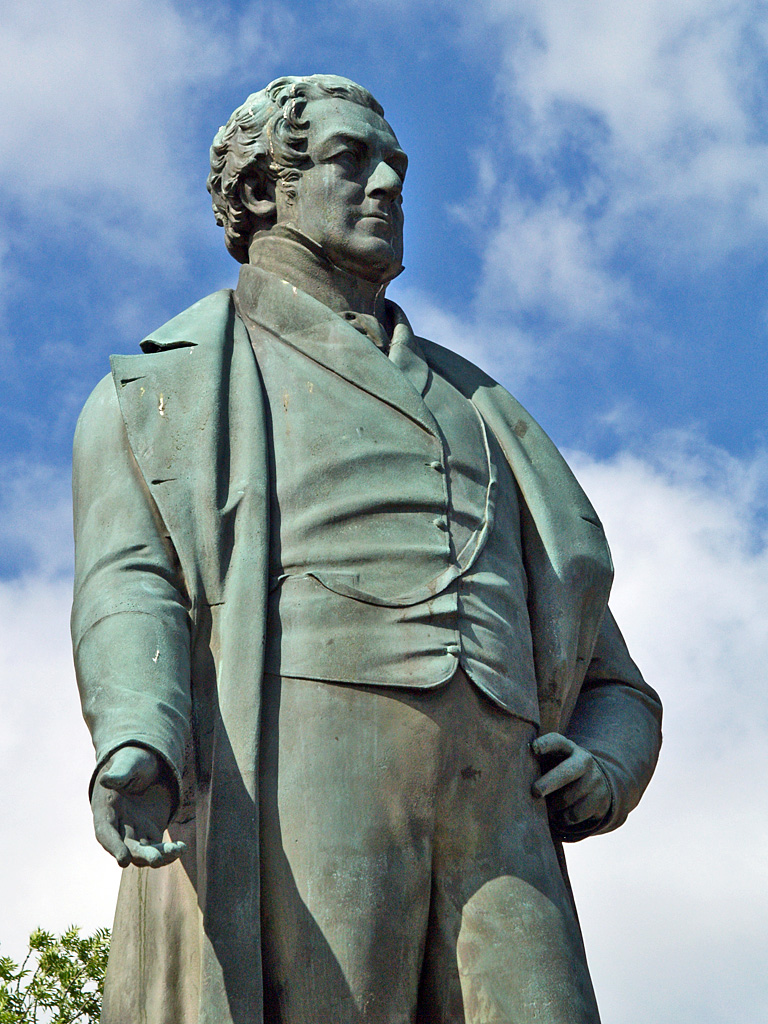
Closeup of statue

The Peel Memorial is a public statue by Edward Hodges Baily, a 19th-century British artist best known for sculpting Nelson on Nelson's Column. It stands in the centre of Bury, Greater Manchester, England, and commemorates the life of Sir Robert Peel—twice UK Prime Minister and founder of the British Conservative Party—who was born in Bury.

The statue is made of bronze and stands 3.5 metres (11 ft) tall. Peel is depicted in contemporary dress with a long coat, shown as if "addressing the House of Commons on the memorable subject of Free Trade".

The statue is mounted on a granite pedestal measuring 3.66 metres (12 ft) in height. The front of the pedestal bears the Peel family coat of arms and the word "Peel" in bronze capital letters. The left and right sides feature bronze bas-reliefs representing Commerce and Navigation, while the back of the pedestal displays a circular bronze panel containing a quotation from one of Peel's speeches.

The statue was originally surrounded by an iron railing with gas lights at each corner, although these were later removed.

== Inscription ==
The inscription on the back of the pedestal reads:
"IT MAY BE, / I SHALL LEAVE A NAME / SOMETIMES REMEMBERED / WITH EXPRESSIONS OF GOOD WILL / IN THE ABODE OF THOSE WHOSE LOT / IT IS TO LABOR, AND TO EARN THEIR / DAILY BREAD BY THE SWEAT OF / THEIR BROW – WHEN THEY SHALL / RECRUIT THEIR EXHAUSTED STRENGTH / WITH ABUNDANT AND UNTAXED FOOD / THE SWEETER, BECAUSE IT IS / NO LONGER LEAVENED BY A / SENSE OF INJUSTICE"
This is a quotation from Peel's speech to the House of Commons upon resigning as Prime Minister on 29 June 1846.

== History ==
On 10 July 1850, eight days after Peel's sudden and unexpected death, a public meeting at the courthouse in Bury Town Hall resolved that "a monument be erected in some central part of the town as a perpetual memorial of our eminent townsman." A subsequent campaign also lobbied for a monument at the top of Harcles Hill near Ramsbottom.

A Testimonial Committee was appointed to oversee the erection of the memorial, and subscriptions were invited to raise funds for it. Eventually, a sum of £2,700 was collected, of which £2,500 was allocated for the memorial, with the remainder covering expenses. Nearly 2,000 individuals contributed, with subscriptions ranging from £200 given by Mr Thomas Norris of Preston, to 1d donated by Miss Rachel Knowles.

The committee decided that the memorial should take the form of a bronze statue on a granite base. Rather than holding an open competition, they chose to invite submissions from notable sculptors. Twenty-one artists were asked to submit ideas, including Baily, Carlo Marochetti, John Henry Foley and William Calder Marshall.

In February 1851, an exhibition was held at the town hall to allow the public to inspect the submissions. Many statuettes, busts and architectural designs were displayed. Over a period of several days, 14,286 people viewed the exhibits. Although the venue forbade admission to "Persons in Clogs", the working people of Bury were so enthusiastic to see the exhibition that many "ran up the steps in their stocking-feet". Following a committee meeting on 14 February 1851, it was decided to offer the commission to Baily.

The statue was cast at Frederic Robinson and Edward Cottam's Statue Foundry and Bronze Works in Pimlico, London. The foundry employed a new technique that allowed the statue to be cast as a single piece of bronze. It was described as "a cast of surpassing beauty – almost perfect from the mould itself".

The finished statue was inaugurated on 8 September 1852. The ceremony was attended by Peel's brothers John (the Dean of Worcester) and Lawrence, his son Frederick (then MP for Bury), many local dignitaries, and a crowd of 10–15,000 people. The following day saw the ceremonial opening of the Peel Monument above the village of Holcombe near Ramsbottom, at which Frederick was also present as guest of honour.

The statue was designated a Grade II listed building on 29 January 1985.

Baily's maquette for the sculpture is preserved at Bury Art Museum.
