= John Harper (architect) =

English architect

John Harper (1809–1842) was an English architect.

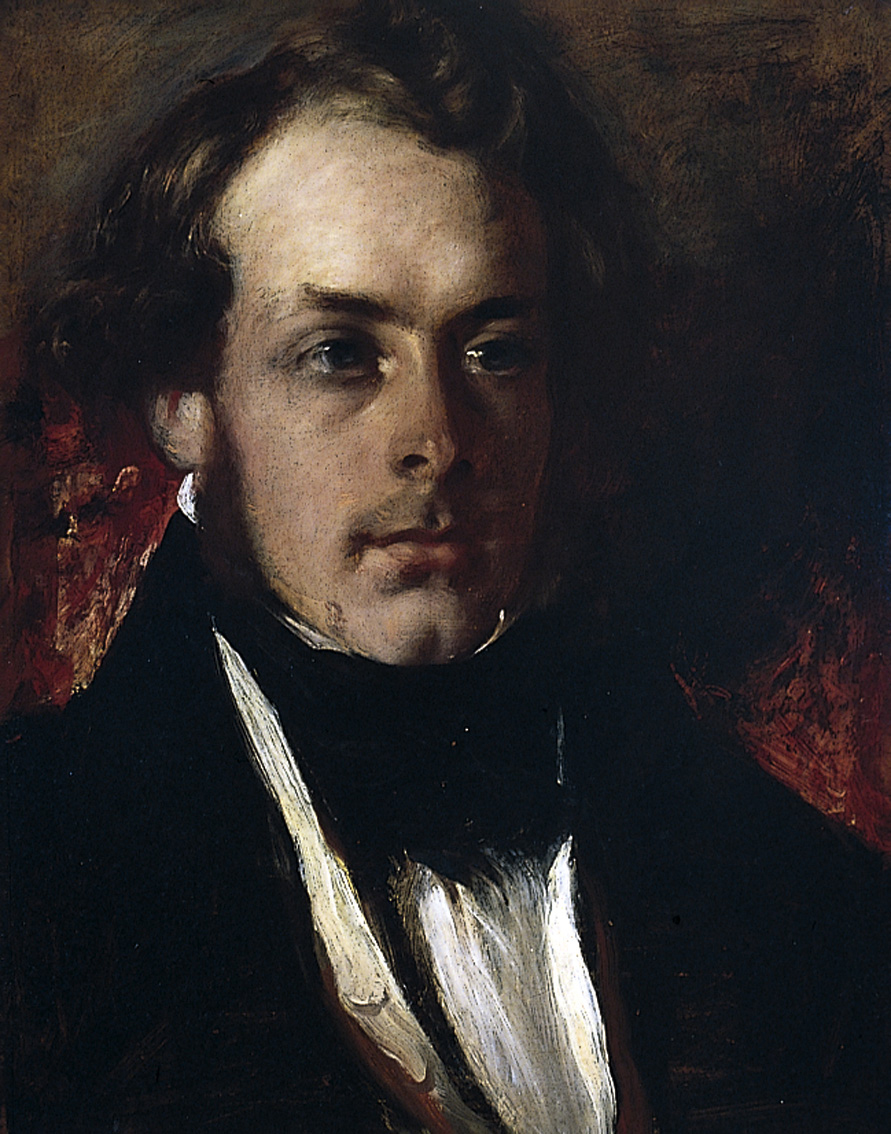
John Harper, portrait by William Etty

== Life ==
Harper was born at Dunkenhalgh Hall, near Blackburn, Lancashire, on 11 November 1809. He studied architecture under Benjamin and Philip Wyatt, and when with them prepared the designs for Apsley House, York House, and the Duke of York's Column.

Harper went into practice as an architect at York. When travelling in Italy to study art, he caught a malarial fever in Rome. While still in a weak state he went on to Naples, where he died on 18 October 1842. William Etty, David Roberts and Clarkson Stanfield were among his friends.

== Works ==
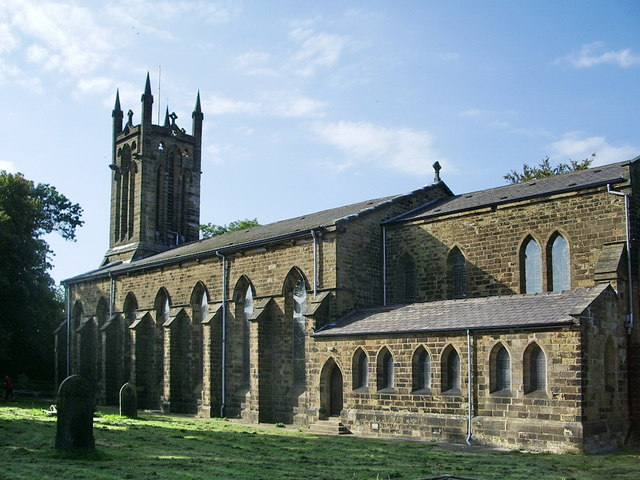
All Saints Church, Clayton-le-Moors, Lancashire, design by John Harper

Harper was employed by the Duke of Devonshire at Bolton Abbey, by Lord Londesborough, and others. Some of his best-known works were St Peter's School, York, the Roman Catholic church at Bury, Lancashire, and Elton church in the same town. In 1837, Harper was hired by Ann Lister to remodel Shibden Hall shortly before his death.

== Depictions ==
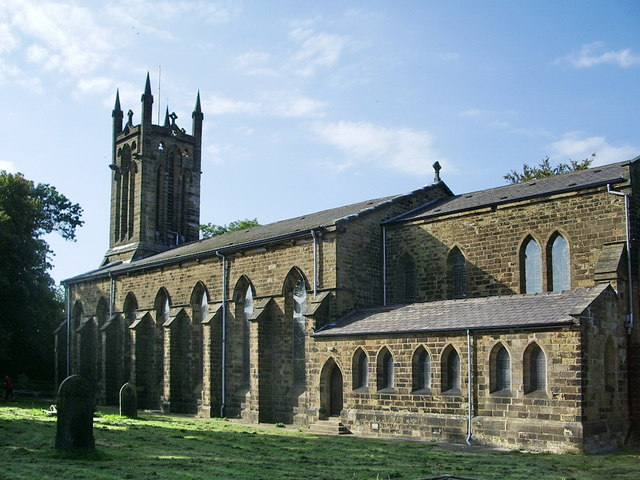
All Saints Church, Clayton-le-Moors, Lancashire, design by John Harper

Harper was depicted in Gentleman Jack Tv Series Season 2 Episode 7 and 8 by actor Luke Newberry as he begins to remodel Shibden Hall. His work and person was described by the characters as "excellent and young at only 26...He is widely regarded as something of a phenomenon. They all say he is destined for very great things" (season 2 episode 7).
