= Church of St Mary the Virgin, Bury =

Coordinates: 53.5940°N 2.2971°W

Parish Church of St Mary the Virgin, Bury
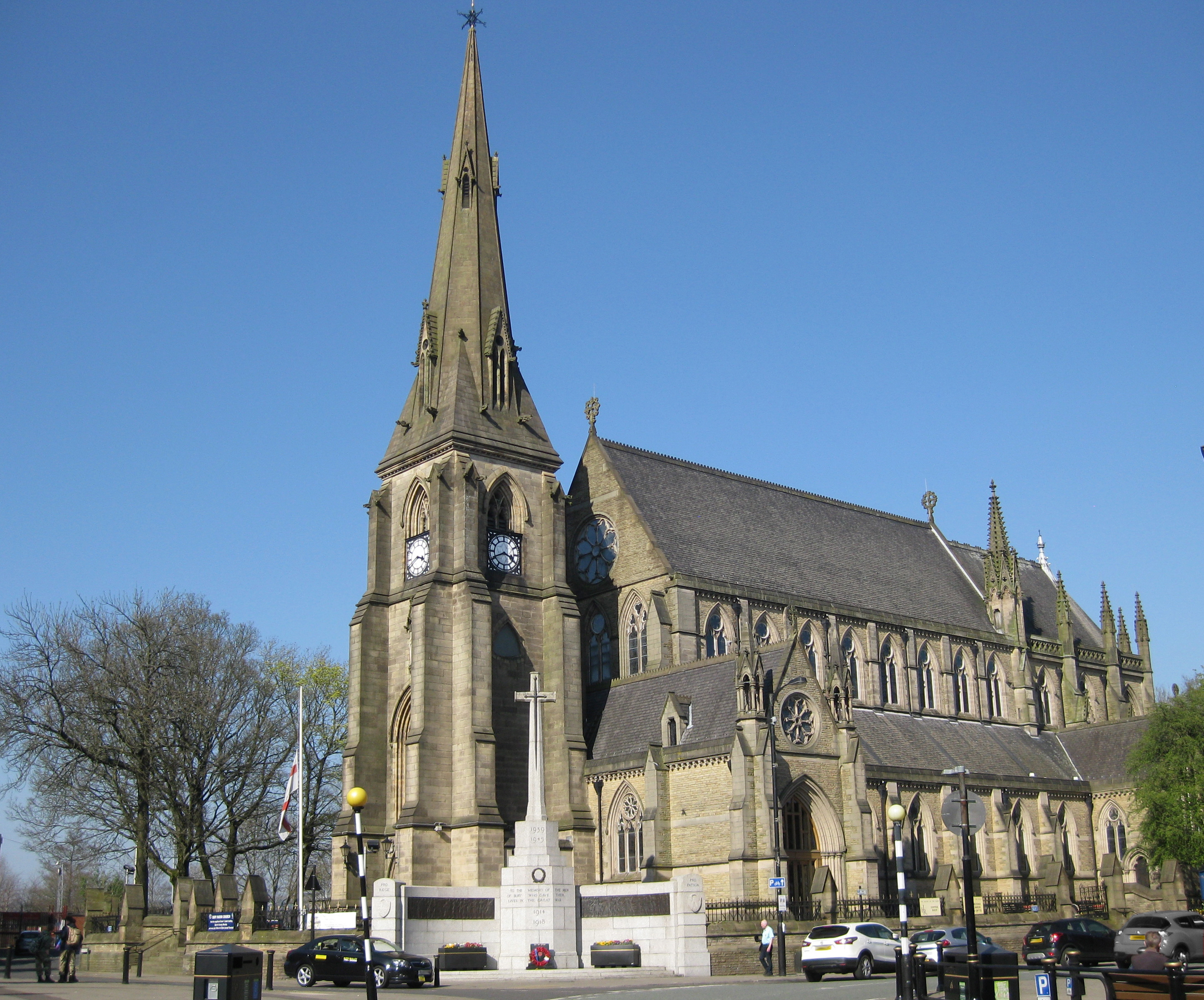
- Parish Church of St Mary the Virgin, Bury

- Location in Greater Manchester
- OS grid reference: SD 80433 10863
- Location: The Rock, Bury, Greater Manchester
- Country: England
- Denomination: Anglican
- Website: Bury Parish Church

History
- Status: Parish church
- Founded: 971 CE
- Dedication: Virgin Mary
- Consecrated: Candlemas 1876

Architecture
- Functional status: Active
- Heritage designation: Grade I
- Designated: 13 July 2006
- Architect(s): J. S. Crowther (1870 rebuild)
- Architectural type: Church
- Completed: 1876

Specifications
- Length: 141 feet (43.0 m)
- Height: 76 feet (23.2 m)
- Materials: Dressed stone exterior partially lined in brick Slate roof

Administration
- Province: York
- Diocese: Manchester
- Archdeaconry: Bolton
- Deanery: Bury

Clergy
- Rector: Revd. Julian Heaton

The Parish Church of St Mary the Virgin is located at the highest point in the town centre of Bury, Greater Manchester, England. It is situated on the edge of the town centre. The main body of the church was completed on 2 February 1876, the steeple predates it to 1842. It is designated in the National Heritage List for England as a Grade I listed building.

== History ==
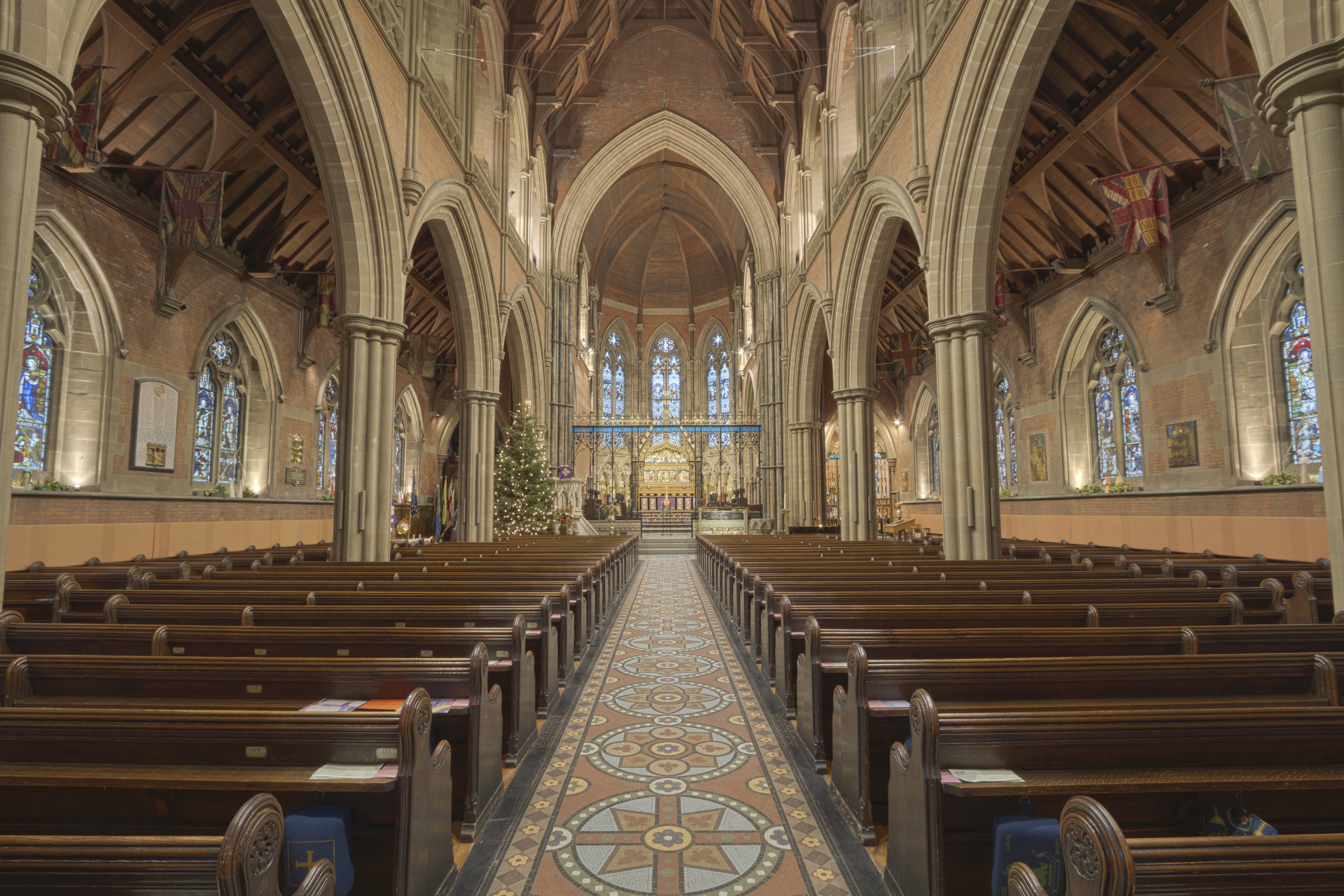
The interior of the church

Church records suggest that the first church was built on the site in 971 A.D. when parishes were first formed by Edgar, King of England, although this is likely to have been a wood and thatch structure. Churches of this type of construction are thought to have been used until a church in the gothic style was completed in 1585. Between 1773 and 1780 the main body of this church was demolished and rebuilt leaving only the spire from the original church. The spire was replaced in 1842 but by 1870 the wood in the rest of the church had rotted and a new building was needed. The new church designed by the architect J. S. Crowther, leaving the 1842 spire in place, was officially opened on Candlemas Day 1876.

In July 2013, the church was the scene of a military funeral for murdered British soldier Lee Rigby. The service was attended by thousands of mourners, including Prime Minister David Cameron.

The church is a regimental church of the Lancashire Fusiliers and the Regimental Colours hang in the nave. A former garrison church, services are held for the garrison on Remembrance Sunday, Gallipoli Sunday and on other occasions.

== Architecture ==
The building is of dressed stone with slate roofs, with a buttressed 3-stage tower with a spire. The interior features a hammerbeam and tie-beam roof and mosaic flooring. There is stained glass by Hardman and Clayton and Bell.

The clock in the tower was the gift of Henry Whitehead, a former High Sheriff of Lancashire.

== See also ==
- Listed buildings in Bury
- List of churches in Greater Manchester
- List of works by J. S. Crowther
