= Derby Hall, Bury =

Derby Hall
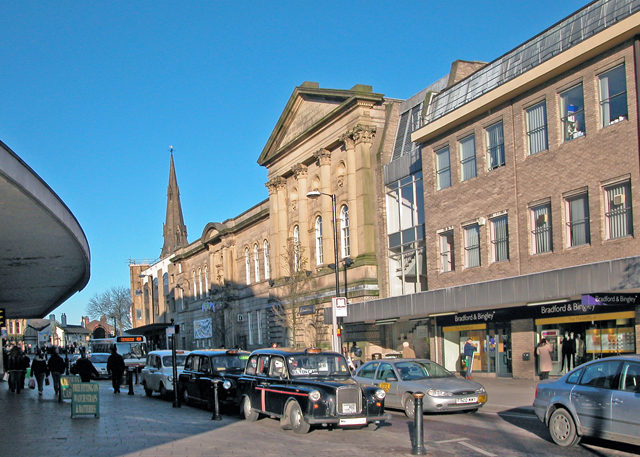
- The Derby Hall, with Athenaeum House on the right

- Shown in Greater Manchester
- 53.5929°N 2.297°W
- Location: Bury

History
- Built: 1850

Site notes
- Architect: Sydney Smirke
- Architectural style: Neo-classical

Listed Building – Grade II
- Designated: 3 February 1971
- Reference no.: 1067239

The Derby Hall is a Victorian neo-classical building situated on Market Street in the centre of Bury, Greater Manchester, England. It is a Grade II listed building.

== History ==
The Derby Hall was built in the late 1840s at the instigation of Edward Smith-Stanley, 13th Earl of Derby. It was designed by Sydney Smirke, an architect best known today for his work on the circular reading room at the British Museum. The building has a central Venetian window and a pedimented portico with four attached columns.

It was originally the central part of a larger development that included the Derby Hotel on the left, and the Athenaeum on the right (both also designed by Smirke). These other two buildings were demolished in 1965 and 1971, respectively. Construction of the building began at Christmas 1848 and was completed in October 1850. The hall was opened on 6 November 1850 with a concert which was attended by 600 people.

The building was originally known as the Public Rooms, although it quickly became known as the Town Hall. At its opening, it contained a magistrate's court, a police station, the Earl of Derby's estate offices and a large assembly room. Stanley hoped the building would become the meeting place for Bury's council; however, owing to a disagreement between the earl and the local authority, it was not initially used for that purpose. After the First World War the council acquired the building from the Stanley family and used it as a council building. The council moved to the new Town Hall on Knowsley Street in 1954 and, since 1979, the building has been operated by a registered charity called Bury Metropolitan Arts Association, which uses it as a theatre and concert venue known as The Met.

One notable concert held in the building was by rock band Joy Division on 8 April 1980, which descended into a riot after some of the audience started throwing bottles at the stage. This was because Alan Hempstall of Crispy Ambulance and Simon Topping of A Certain Ratio filled in on vocals, since Joy Division's own lead singer Ian Curtis was recovering from an attempted suicide attempt the previous day.

== See also ==
- Listed buildings in Bury
