= Margaret Elwyn Sparshott =

British nurse (1870–1940)

Margaret Elwyn Sparshott CBE RRC
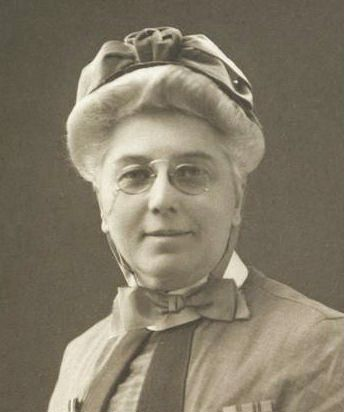
- Sparshott in 1919
- Born: 4 August 1870; Mahé, Seychelles
- Died: 9 October 1940 (aged 70); Beckenham, Kent, England
- Years active: 1895–1929
- Father: Thomas Henry Sparshott
- Medical career
- Profession: Matron
- Institutions: Manchester Royal Infirmary; 207 (Manchester) General Hospital; Royal College of Nursing

Margaret Elwyn Sparshott (4 August 1870 – 9 October 1940) was a British nurse. She was the principal matron of Manchester Royal Infirmary, and of the Territorial Force Nursing Service at Manchester, England. During the First World War, she used 2nd Western General Hospital as a base, and had the assistance of St John Ambulance, the Voluntary Aid Detachment (VADs) and the Red Cross. Within this framework she was responsible for the running of twenty-two large auxiliary hospitals, including the field hospitals for the war wounded, in Stockport, Salford and Manchester. Her duty extended to coping with increased patient numbers during the 1918–1920 flu pandemic.

Sparshott was one of the instrumental founding members of the Royal College of Nursing. As a member she campaigned for appropriate pay and training systems for nurses, and was its president in 1930–1933. Sparshott never married, and her dedication to her career brought her appointment as Commander of the Order of the British Empire (CBE), the award of the Royal Red Cross, her name on a nurses' training establishment, and a blue plaque in her honour, affixed to the wall of Manchester Royal Infirmary.

== Background ==
Margaret Elwyn "Peggy" Sparshott was born on 4 August 1870 in Mahé, Seychelles. (Note: Although formal registers, including her death certificate, spell her middle name "Elwin", Sparshott used the spelling "Elwyn" as her professional name. This is reflected in documents created by the hospitals and other institutions that she was involved with, and the spelling "Elwyn" is used on her memorial plaque affixed to the wall of Manchester Royal Infirmary.) She was the eldest surviving child of the English missionary Reverend Thomas Henry Sparshott and his Scottish wife Margaret McArthur, daughter of Hugh McArthur of Greenock. In 1881 the census records Sparshott living with her parents and siblings in Cholmondeley Parsonage, Cheshire. On 14 July 1885, when Sparshott was not yet fifteen years old, her mother Margaret died, (Note: Margaret McArthur (Scotland 1837 – Cheshire 14 July 1885). GRO index: Deaths Sep 1885 Sparshott Margaret 48 Nantwich 8a 209. Margaret M. Sparshott died at Cholmondeley Parsonage.) after suffering "acute mania" for twelve days, followed by exhaustion. (Note: Margaret McArthur (Scotland 1837 – Cheshire 14 July 1885). GRO index: Deaths Sep 1885 Sparshott Margaret 48 Nantwich 8a 209. The death certificate says: "Fourteenth July 1885, Cholmondeley RSD, Margaret Sparshott, 48 years. Wife of Thomas Henry Sparshott, Domestic Chaplain to the Marquis of Cholmondeley. Acute mania 12 days. Exhaustion. Ellen Gough present at the death".) Sparshott was educated at the Clergy Daughters' School in Casterton, Cumberland.

In 1929, at the age of 59, Sparshott retired from her employment as matron, receiving an annual pension of £300 (equivalent to £16,478 in 2025) and removed to 49 Avenue Road, Penge, London. The 1939 England and Wales Register finds her living at the same address. Her home address was still 49 Avenue Road, Penge, when she died on 9 October 1940 of neurodegenerative disease and arteriosclerosis, at 6 Brackley Road, Beckenham. Her brother William Romaine Sparshott was the registrar's informant. (Note: GRO index: Deaths Dec 1940 Sparshott Margaret E 70 Bromley 2a 1785. Details of death certificate: Place of death, 6 Brackley Road, Beckenham, Kent. Margaret Elwin Sparhott, 70 years, of 49 Avenue Road, Penge, spinster, nurse, retired. Cause of death (1a) cerebral degeneration, (b) arterio sclerosis. Informant W.R. Sparshott, brother, of Cavendish Avenue, Sherwood, Nottingham.) Her will was proved on 10 December 1940; she left £1,648 8s 1d (equivalent to £79,782.83 in 2025), her brother William Romaine Sparshott being named as executor.

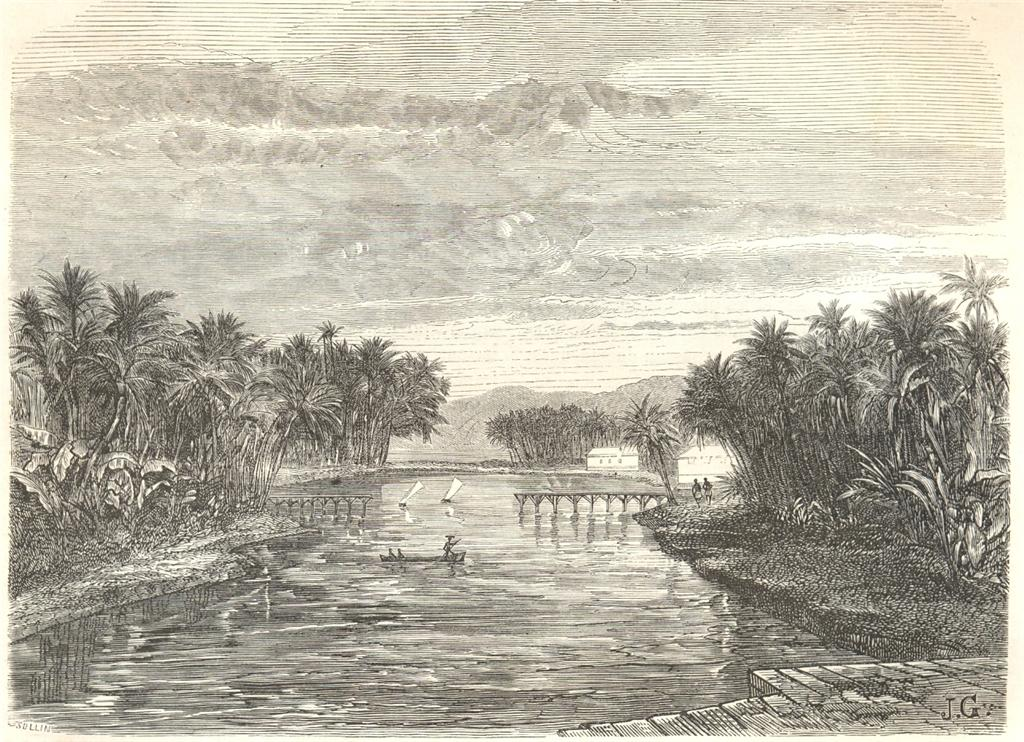
Mahé, Seychelles, where Sparshott was born

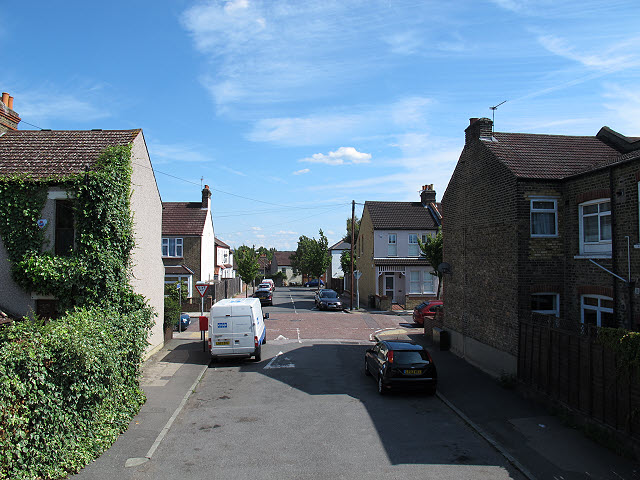
Avenue Road, Penge, where Sparshott retired

== Career ==
Throughout her career, Sparshott was "actively involved in the promotion of nursing as a profession". By 1891 she was training as a nurse and living in nurses' accommodation at Nottingham General Hospital for the Sick Poor. At that hospital between 1891 and 1895, Sparshott completed her three years' probational training, before accepting the position of sister for two years in the men's accident and surgical ward at the same institution. She was subsequently employed at Birmingham General Hospital as night sister or night superintendent for three years, before taking the post of matron at Grimsby District General Hospital before 1901. (Note: Grimsby District General Hospital, at Scartho Road, Grimsby, was an earlier incarnation of Diana, Princess of Wales Hospital which replaced it in 1983.) So, in 1901, the census finds Sparshott as a matron aged 30, in residential accommodation at the latter hospital. She was then appointed matron at the Derbyshire Royal Infirmary, where she remained until 1907.

Sparshott was the lady superintendent (or matron) of Manchester Royal Infirmary (MRI) from 17 August 1907 to 1929. Thus in 1911, at the age of 40, she was living at the same infirmary, identifying herself under her official title of lady superintendent of nurses, i.e., matron. On arrival at her post, at the age of 37, she "immediately set out to improve the standards of the nursing school and the administration of the hospital ... [She began] a register of nurses [at the MRI] ... and helped establish a Manchester branch of the [Royal College of Nursing]". She oversaw the rebuilding of the hospital, which was completed in 1909, and the transfer of staff and facilities to the new site. In 1923, Sparshott found herself amid some controversy about her refusal to admit nurses with bobbed hair for training. She was backed by the London hospital matrons, who considered the hairstyle untidy, while long hair could be neatly tied back.

After her retirement in 1929, Sparshott "continued wholeheartedly to support nurse training at the hospital". By 1911, she was being paid £200 (equivalent to £20,368 in 2025) per annum, with extra pay for other duties.

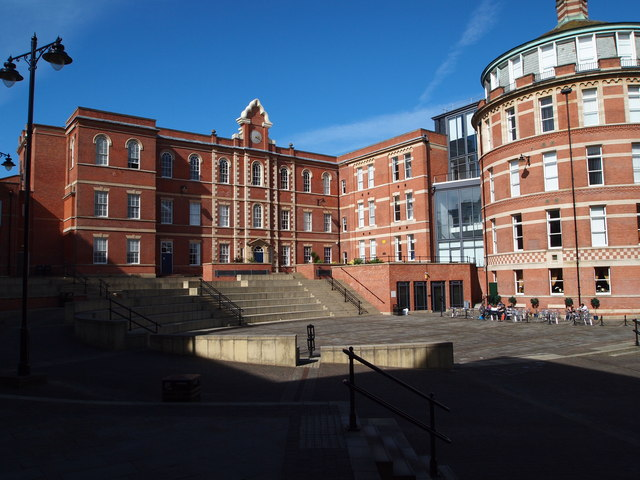
Nottingham General Hospital

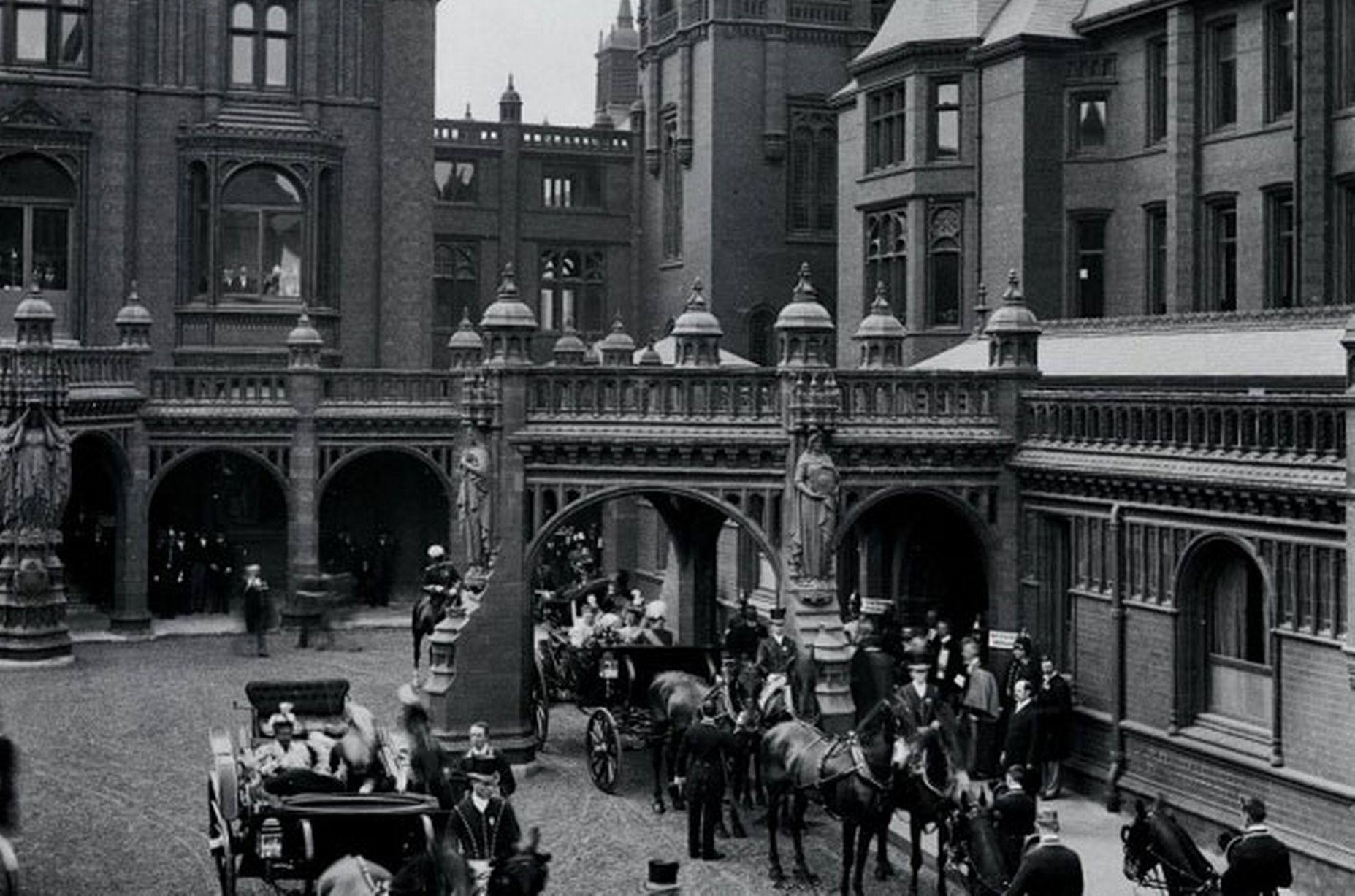
Birmingham General Hospital

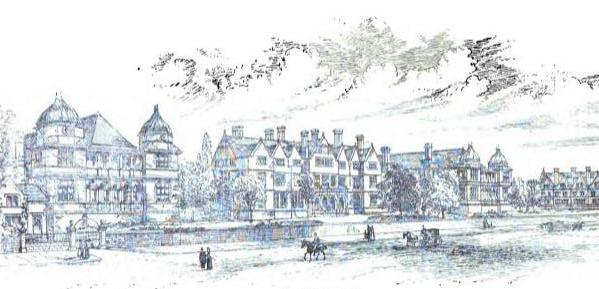
Derbyshire Royal Infirmary

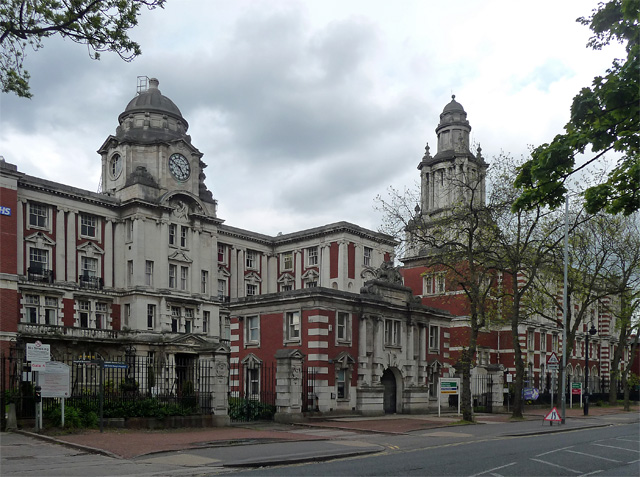
Manchester Royal Infirmary

=== First World War ===
"Miss Sparshott's administrative ability and the energy and skill of her nursing staff were stretched to the utmost during the war years." She became a matron of the Territorial Force Nursing Service in 1909, and was co-opted as a member of the East Lancashire Territorial Army Association. Preparations for war service began in 1910, when the War Office requested that fifteen Manchester nurses be selected as a reserve for service in local wartime hospitals, and thus the idea of the registration of nurses began to be put into practice.

In the event, Sparshott had to select and register more than the suggested fifteen nurses. During the First World War, as principal matron at Manchester, she organised the nursing staff and facilities at the 207 (Manchester) General Hospital (RAMC (V), and Whitworth Street military hospital (or 2nd Western General Hospital) which had 630 sisters and 3,800 beds, "many of them trained in the wards of the MRI". She was assisted by St John Ambulance, the VADs and the Red Cross. Although an extra 250 beds were provided by the War Office, making Manchester Royal Infirmary an 884-bed facility, by October 1914 those beds were filled with military patients. In due course 520 beds were taken by the war-wounded. Using the 2nd Western as a base, Sparshott managed the 22 auxiliary hospitals of Stockport, Salford and Manchester. Concurrently with this responsibility, Sparshott sent nurses to military hospitals, both in the U.K. and behind the lines. William Brockbank (1970) says: "During the war the sick and wounded dealt with by 2nd Western General Hospital and its auxiliary hospitals was larger than any other general hospital in the country, a record in considerable measure due to the efficient administration of Miss Sparshott".

Under Sparshott, the Manchester hospitals continued to cope under pressure of patient numbers for a while after the war. The 1918–1920 flu pandemic "filled the MRI wards beyond their nursing capacity" in its first two years. By summer 1919, all the war-wounded had been transferred to military facilities.

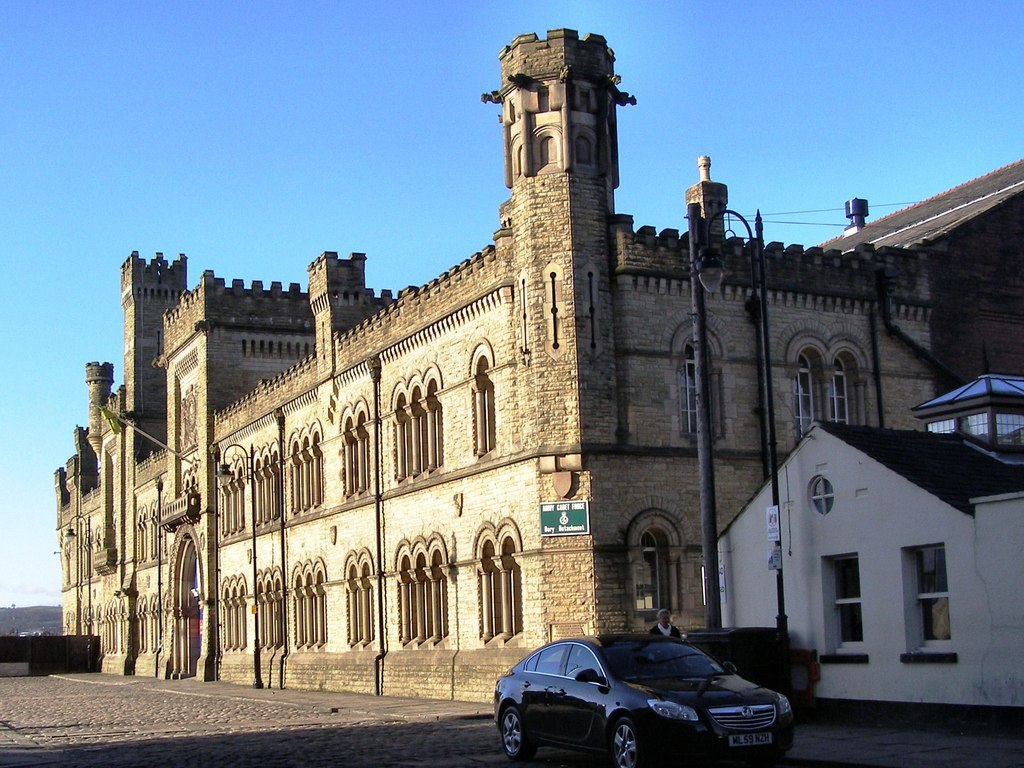
Castle Armoury, a site used by 207 (Manchester) Field Hospital

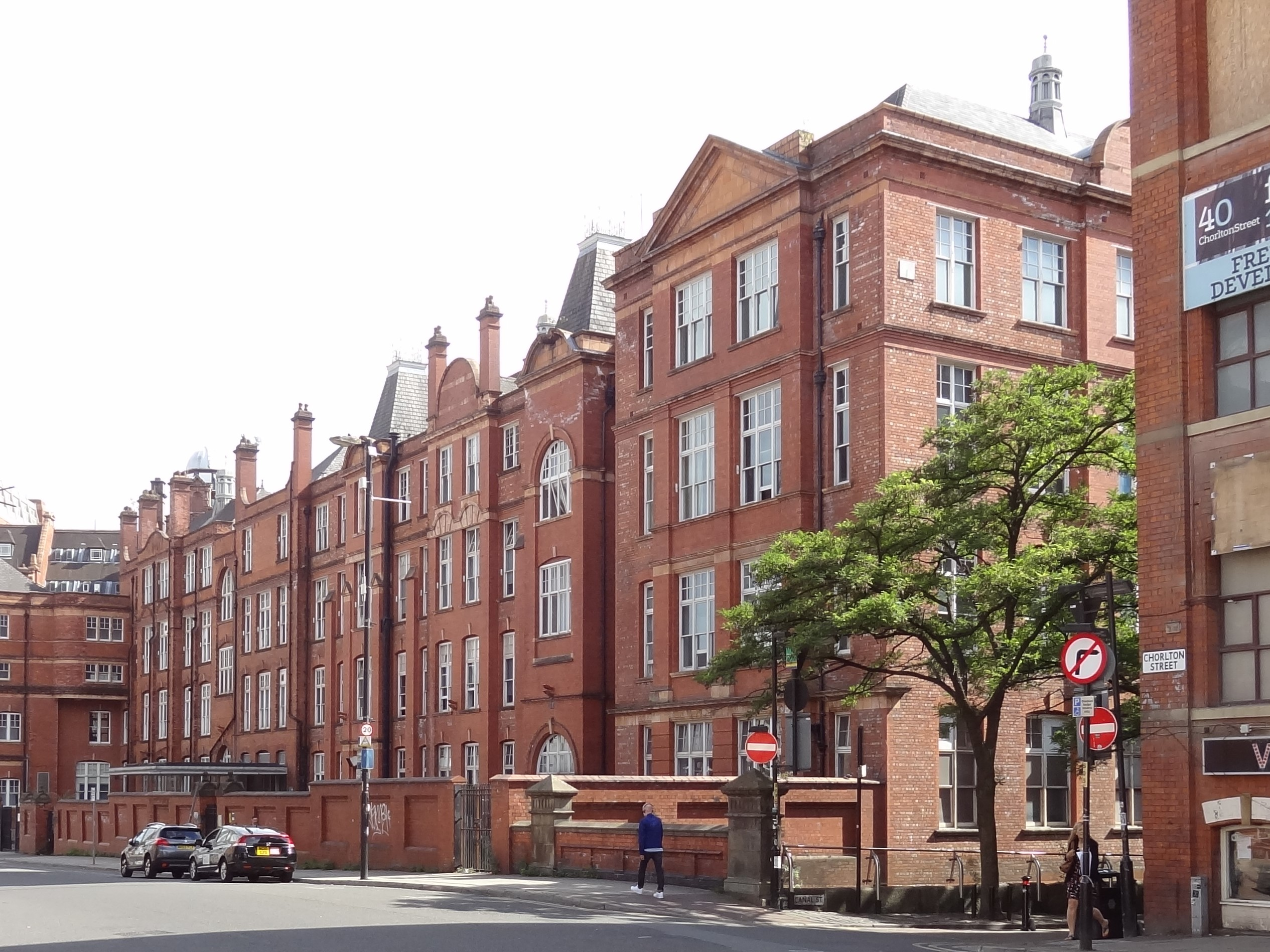
Chorlton Street, Manchester, a site used by 2nd Western General Hospital

=== Lighter moments ===
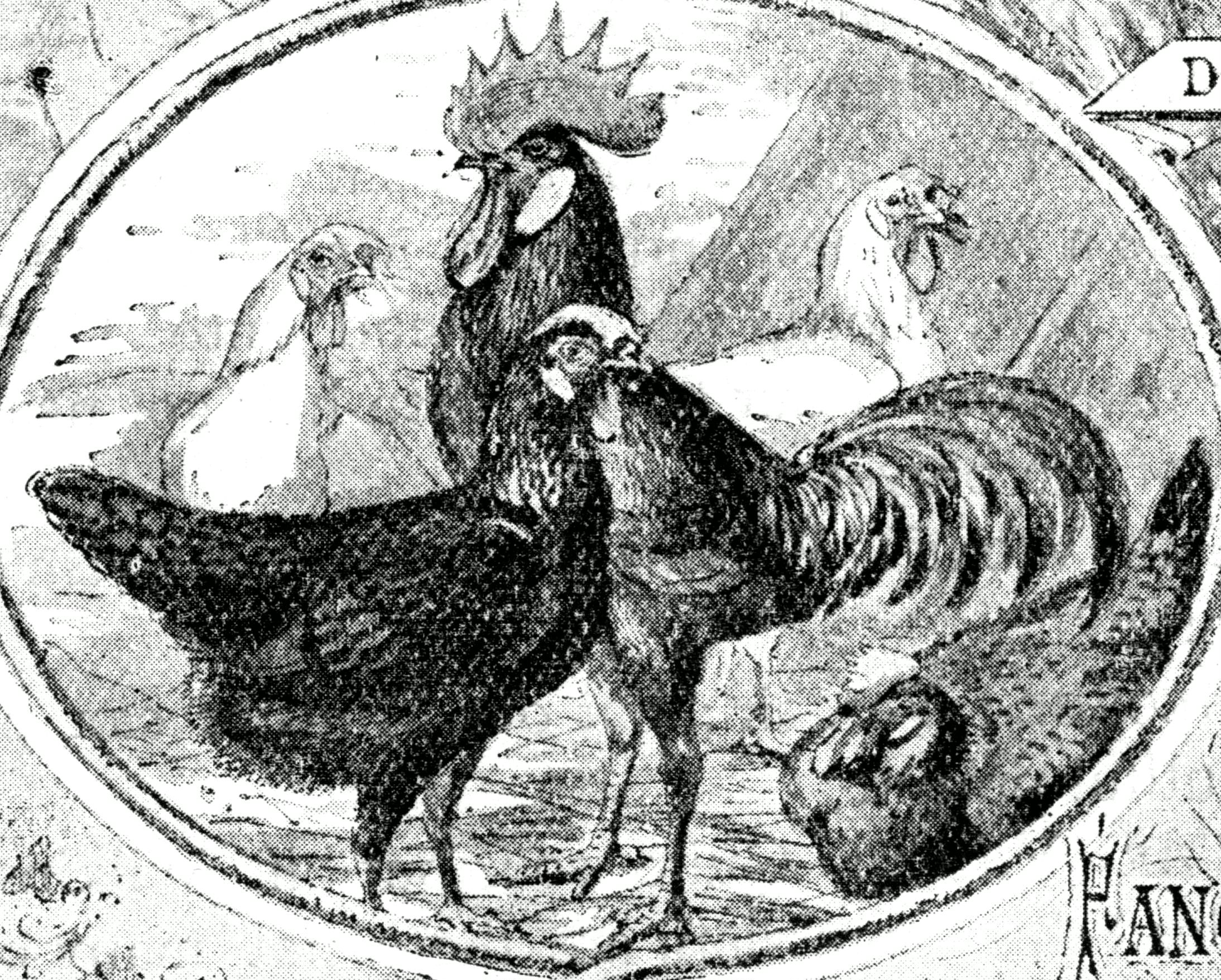
Minorcas, in 1898

In 1913 the women-only Matron's Ball at the MRI was gatecrashed by three junior doctors wearing women's evening dress. They were temporarily suspended, but after a minor contretemps and an apology, they were formally forgiven by Sparshott, who had "an excellent sense of humour". In 1919, "with a development of the humour associated with the initiation", the nurses of the MRI, headed by Sparshott, presented Mrs Howard Clay, mayoress of Halifax, West Yorkshire, with a "wretched black minorca cockerel". The gift was to form the nucleus of the mayoress's projected white elephant stall at a bazaar in aid of the Nation's Fund for Nurses. The taxidermied cockerel was donated on the grounds that the nurses had acquired it at another bazaar and "did not know what to do with it". The mayoress appreciated the joke, and said that "of course she would" accept it.

== Institutions ==
The idea of a college of nursing was first mooted in 1915 by Sir Arthur Stanley, an MP. On 28 July 1916, a meeting of 600 people, led by Sparshott, took place in the MRI outpatient department, where it was decided that a Bill would be "presented to Parliament to promote the foundation of the College". The registration of the college took place in the same year, "Miss Sparshott being one of the 11 matrons who signed the articles of association".

In 1918 the new College of Nursing brought together Sparshott and eighty matrons to discuss the state registration of nurses. Thus Sparshott was "actively involved in the formation of the Royal College of Nursing (RCN)", and was its president between 1930 and 1933. She was a "committed supporter of the College and state registration". After the First World War ended, "she challenged standards of pay and emoluments", and she campaigned for a system in which nurse-teachers trained probationer nurses. Sparshott was elected to the College council in 1923, coming "top of the poll", but had to obtain special permission to attend the requisite three meetings per month, due to her responsibilities as matron of the MRI. In 1937 she attended a RCN annual general meeting, along with Matron Euphemia Steele Innes, both attending as elected council members for the English Section. The RCN commented as follows:

Sparshott was a committed supporter of the College of Nursing (member no.11) and state registration from the start in 1916. She had even begun a register of nurses at MRI and helped establish a Manchester Branch of the College. She also served on the first General Nursing Council for England & Wales, from 1919 until her death. Sparshott served on the College Council, including as Chair and was elected President, 1930–1933. She felt that nurses could and should control their profession through their chosen leaders. Sparshott believed that the Matrons as women of experience and knowledge should suggest, direct, and control the College.

== Awards ==
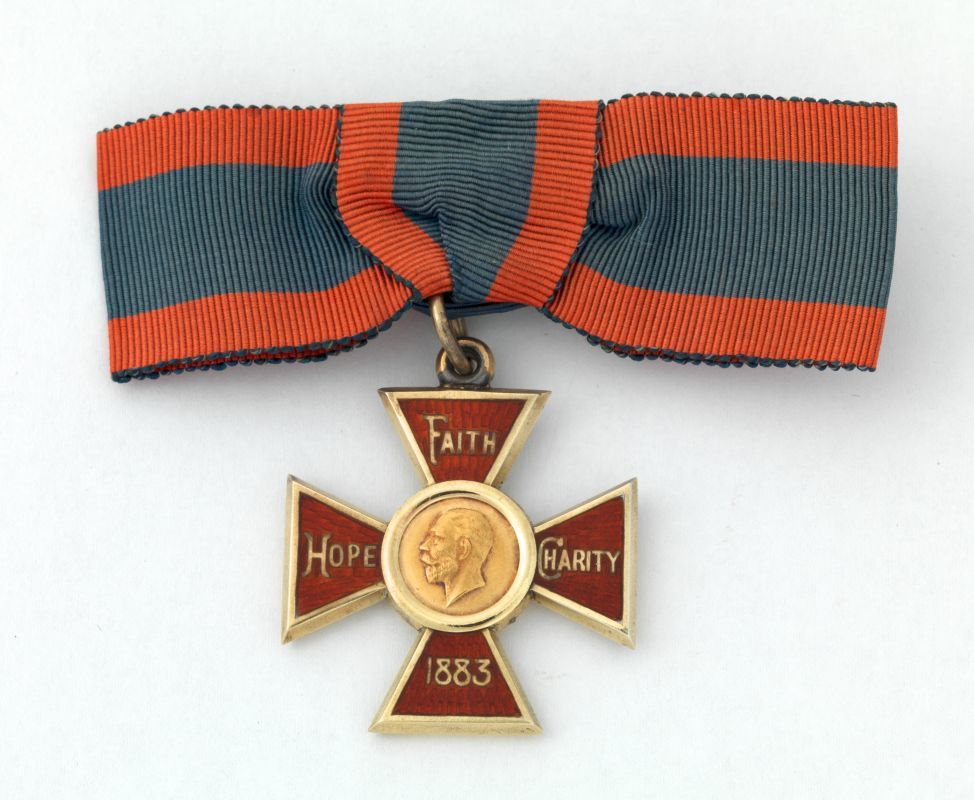
Royal Red Cross medal

Sparshott was awarded the Royal Red Cross First Class in 1916 for her work in the Territorial Force Nursing Service in the First World War, and was appointed Commander of the Order of the British Empire (CBE) in the 1919 Birthday Honours.

Sparshott gave "a large donation to the Building Fund for the new nurses' home at Manchester Royal Infirmary, which would house 266 probationers and nurses and allow 80 nurses to join the hospital staff". This building was completed in 1930, and was named Sparshott House in her memory, (Note: Sparshott House was demolished in 2004. See Flickr) and there is a blue plaque on the hospital in her honour. The institutions which subscribed to the plaque were: Central Manchester University Hospitals NHS Foundation Trust, The Priory of St John, 207 (Manchester) Field Hospital, RCN History of Nursing Society, The Royal College of Nursing North West, and The Manchester Royal Infirmary Nurses' Fellowship.
