= Thomas Henry Sparshott =

British Anglican clergyman (1841–1927)

The Reverend Thomas Henry Sparshott
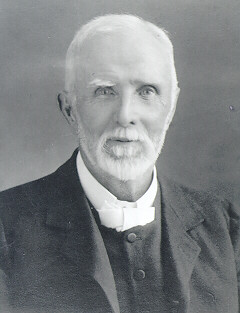
- Born: 31 December 1841; Farringdon, Hampshire, England
- Died: 10 January 1927 (aged 85); Hastings, Sussex, England
- Burial place: St Andrew's churchyard, Hastings
- Other name: Rev Tom
- Education: Apprenticed as a cooper
- Alma mater: Church Missionary Society College, Islington
- Occupation: Priest
- Spouses: Margaret McArthur (m. 1867; died 1885); Laura Lavinia Haynes (m. 1890; died 1939)
- Children: 18, including Margaret Elwyn
- Church: Anglicanism
- Ordained: 1867 (deacon) by Bishop of London; 1871 (priest) by Bishop of Mauritius
- Congregations served: 1872: Buckenham St Nicholas; 1876: Hexham Abbey Church; 1876: Swafield St Nicholas; 1877: Syderstone St Mary; 1890: Elland St Mary; 1911: Weybread St Andrew
- Offices held: 1867: missionary to East Africa; 1873: missionary to Mombasa; 1879: chaplain to George Cholmondeley; 1881–1899: Church Association secretary; 1892: chaplain to PMV Homes Addlestone

Signature
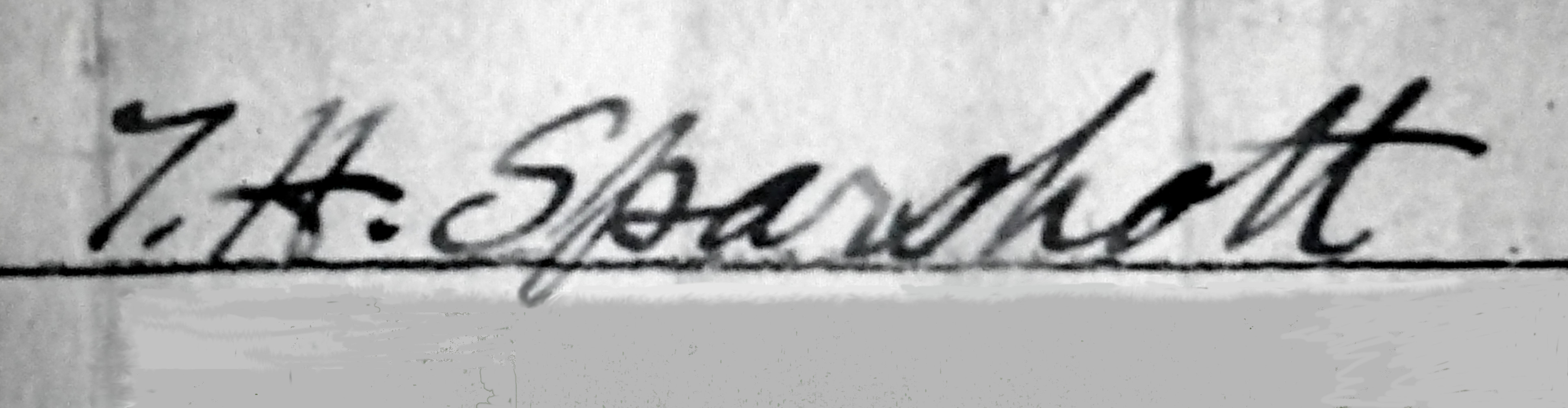

Thomas Henry Sparshott (31 December 1841 – 10 January 1927) was an English Anglican priest, also known as Rev Tom. He served as a missionary in East Africa and in Mombasa, Kenya, as curate and vicar to various English congregations, as chaplain to George Cholmondeley, 4th Marquess of Cholmondeley, and as chaplain to a home for the daughters of female prisoners. For eighteen years he was organising secretary of the Church Association.

Sparshott was known as a "powerful evangelical" preacher. He was a vocal antagonist against the Oxford Movement, and gave lectures and wrote to newspapers on the subject. While serving as chaplain to the Marquess of Cholmondeley, he edited A Nika-English Dictionary, on the subject of a Mijikenda language, and a translation of the Gospel of Luke, in Swahili.

== Background ==
Sparshott's family background was of cooperage and trading. His paternal grandfather was Thomas Sparshott, a cooper, (Note: Thomas Sparshott (c.1791 – Winchester 1852) GRO index: Deaths Jun 1852 Sparshott Thomas Winchester 2c 55) who ran a hardware shop selling casks and turnery at Canon Street, Winchester, and then, from 1832, at 17 High Street, Winchester, opposite the City Arms Inn. His paternal grandmother was Martha Brown. (Note: Martha Sparshott née Brown (died Winchester 13 August 1843). GRO index: Deaths Sep 1843 Sparshott Martha Winchester 7 165)

However Sparshott's parental background was financially insecure, and his work as a cooper may have partially paid for his training. His father was Henry Bartlett Sparshott, (Note: Henry Bartlett Sparshott (1814 – Winchester 1879). GRO index: Deaths Mar 1879 Sparshott Henry Bartlett 65 Winchester 2c 73) a licensed victualler, cooper, basket-maker and brush salesman, of Jewry Street, Winchester. His mother was Mary Haynes. (Note: GRO index: Marriages Sep 1838 Sparshott Henry Bartlett, and Haynes Mary, Chipping Norton 16 45) His parents married in 1838, but by the 1840s, H.B. and Mary Sparshott were in Alton Workhouse (which served the Farringdon parish), with their first child Henrietta. (Note: Henrietta Sparshott (London 22 August 1839 – Winchester 1918) GRO index: Marriages Dec 1875 Johnson Charles Winchester 2c 245. Deaths Mar 1918 Johnson Henrietta 78 Winchester 2c 200.) H.B. Sparshott's business revived, but failed again in 1874. He was nevertheless called a gentleman and accepted for jury service in Winchester.

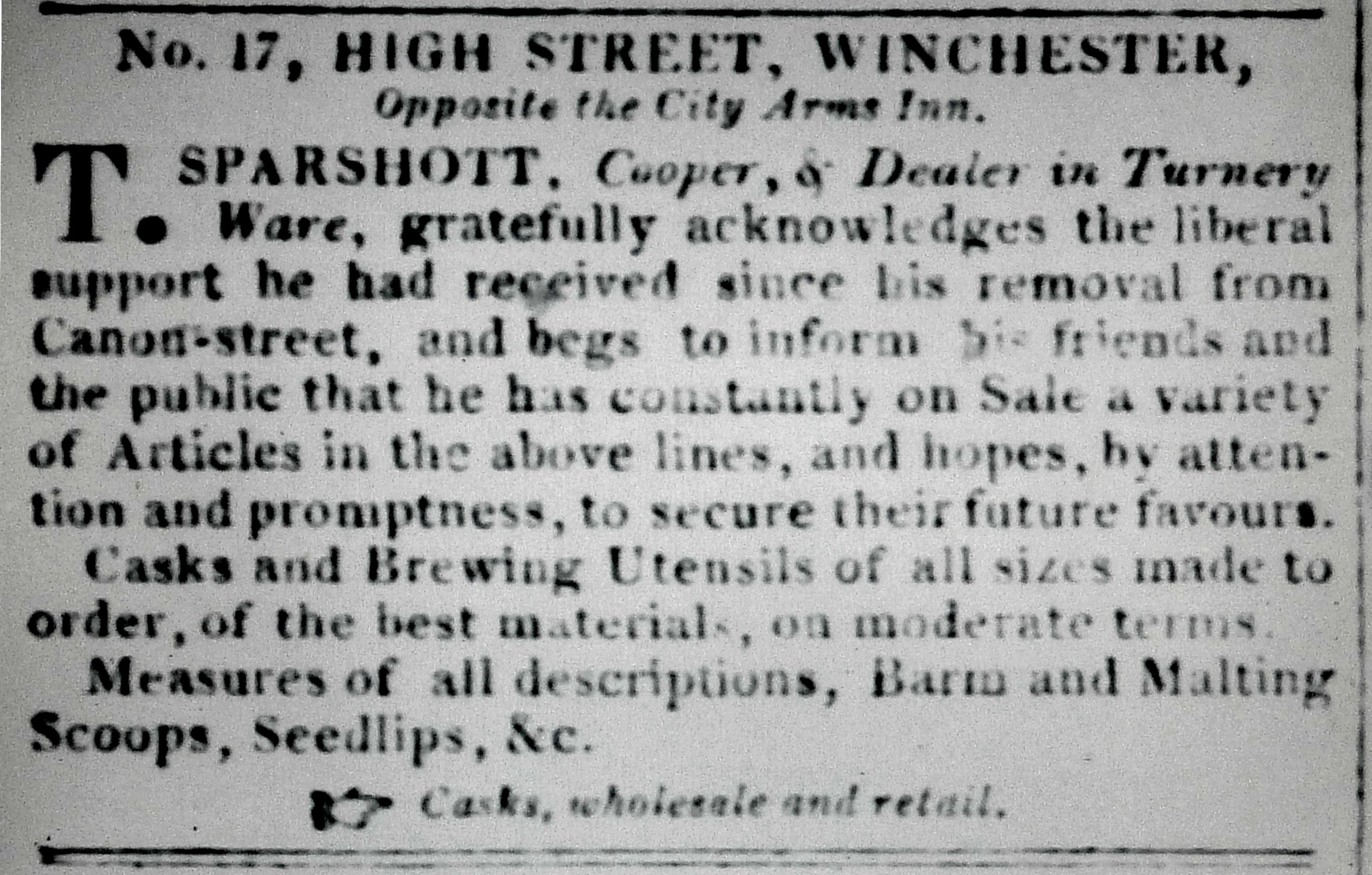
1832 ad for Sparshott's grandfather's shop

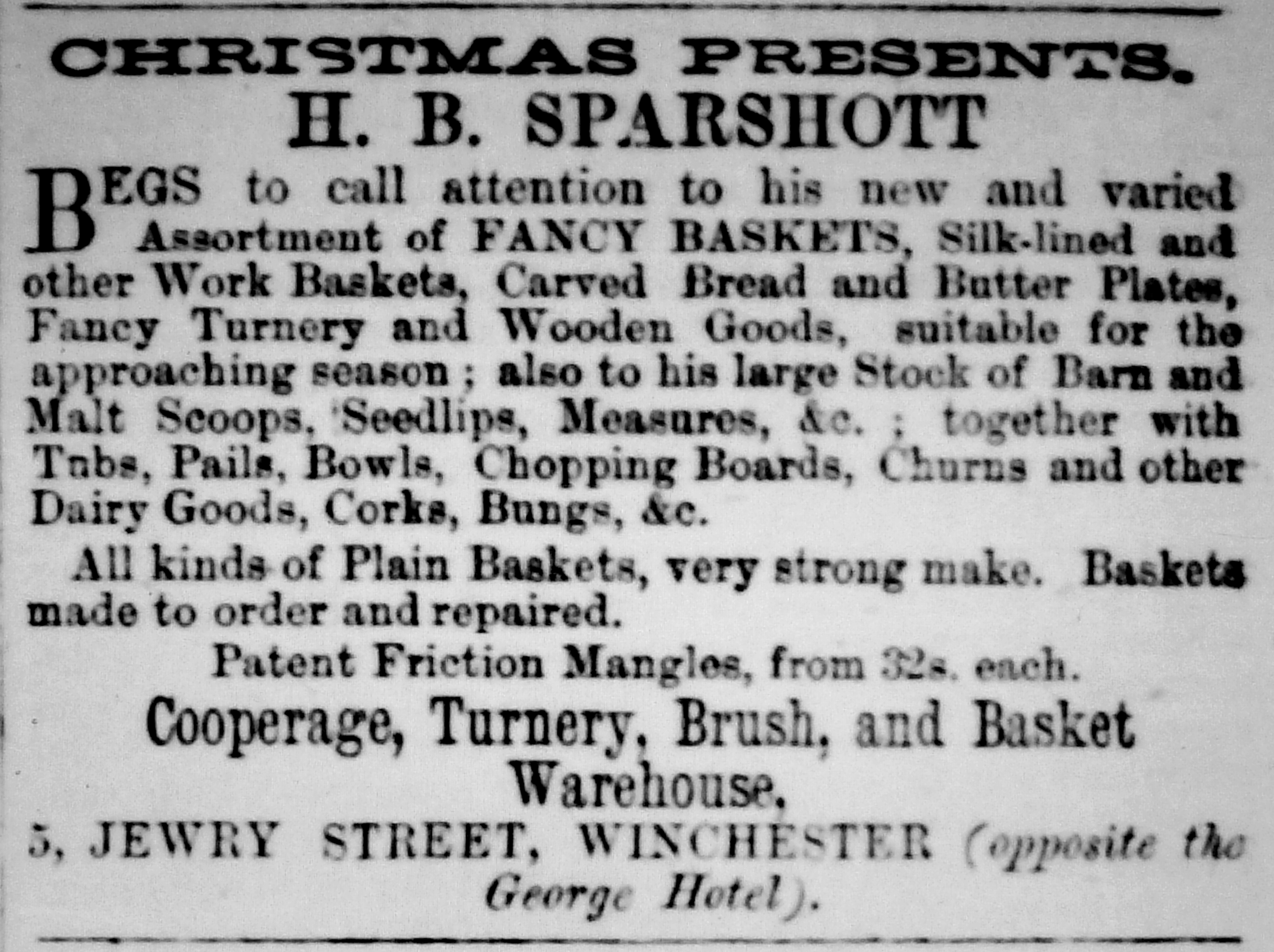
1870 ad for Sparshott's father's shop

Sparshott, the second of five siblings, was born at Farringdon, Hampshire, on 31 December 1841. (Note: GRO index: Births Mar 1842 Sparshott Thomas Henry Alton VII 11. Birth certificate says: Thirty-first of December 1841 at Farringdon. Name Thomas Henry, boy. Father Henry Bartlett Sparshott, a cooper. Mother Mary Sparshott formerly Haynes. Informant Mary Sparshott mother, Farringdon.) He assisted at the marriage of his sister Henrietta in 1876. Henrietta's son was Reverend Thomas Sparshott Johnson, a missionary to Colombo in Ceylon from 1903 to 1904. (Note: Thomas Sparshott Johnson (Winchester 1876 – 1954 or 1959) GRO index: Births Dec 1876 Johnson Thomas Sparshott Winchester 2c 98. Rev. Sparshott-Johnson was author of Astrology and the Scriptures.) His younger brother William assisted his father in the Anchor pub in East Tisted, and afterwards in the hardware shop. His youngest brother, Edward, died aged nine in 1857, after a brief illness, and his youngest sister Fanny died in 1870, aged 24 years.

=== First marriage ===
On 1 August 1867 at Greenock, Renfrewshire, Scotland, Sparshott married Margaret McArthur. He had nine children by his first marriage: Hugh McArthur, Margaret Elwyn, Mary Jane, Henrietta Burt, John McArthur, Matthew McLean S., William Romaine, and two unnamed children. (Note: Children of Sparshott's first marriage: Hugh McArthur Sparshott (16 June 1868 – 20 September 1868), buried in Rabai, Kilifi, Kenya. Margaret Elwyn (Seychelles 4 August 1870 – Beckenham 9 October 1940); Henrietta Burt (Scotland 1873 – 1930); John McArthur (Smallburgh 1876 – Docking 1877), Matthew McLean S. (Syderstone 1879 – 1952), William Romaine. (Syderstone 1879 – Nottingham 1959)) The family does not appear in the 1871 census, because they were in East Africa on a missionary tour of duty. In 1881, the Census finds Sparshott, his first wife Margaret and four of their children living at The Parsonage, Cholmondeley, Cheshire.

Margaret McArthur Sparshott died on 14 July 1885, aged 48, after suffering "acute mania" for twelve days, and then exhaustion. (Note: Margaret McArthur (Scotland 1837 – Cheshire 14 July 1885). GRO index: Deaths Sep 1885 Sparshott Margaret 48 Nantwich 8a 209. The death certificate says: "Fourteenth July 1885, Cholmondeley RSD, Margaret Sparshott, 48 years. Wife of Thomas Henry Sparshott, Domestic Chaplain to the Marquis of Cholmondeley. Acute mania 12 days. Exhaustion. Ellen Gough present at the death".) Sparshott's daughter Margaret Elwyn Sparshott, CBE, RRC, was matron of Manchester Royal Infirmary from 1907 to 1929. In 1930 a new nurses' home in Manchester was named Sparshott House in her memory, (Note: Sparshott House was demolished in 2004. See Flickr) and there is a blue plaque on the hospital in her honour.

=== Second marriage ===
On 16 July 1890 at Holy Trinity Church, Eastbourne, Sparshott married his second wife Laura Lavinia Haynes, who was twenty years his junior and outlived him by about twelve years. (Note: GRO index: Marriages Sep 1890 Sparshott Thomas Henry, Haynes Laura Lavinia. Holy Trinity Eastbourne 2b 139. Age of groom 48 years; age of bride 28 years. Deaths Sep 1939 Sparshott Laura L 77 Hastings 2b 39) He had nine children by his second marriage, of which eight survived. They were engineer Thomas, Frederick Walter, Laura Dorothy, Charles Henry, Nellie or Nelly, Rowland Frank N., Ernest Harold, Clarrie, and Rosalie Grace. (Note: Children of Sparshott's second marriage: Thomas (1892 – 1951), Frederick Walter (Chertsey 1892 – Kingston Surrey 1900), Laura Dorothy, Charles Henry (Wimbledon 1895 – Portsmouth 1933), Nellie or Nelly (b. Wimbledon 1897), Rowland Frank N. (Wimbledon 9 April 1898 – Wimbledon 1985), Ernest Harold (Wimbledon 22 March 1899 – 1983), Clarrie (b. Wimbledon 1904), Rosalie Grace (Wimbledon 22 July 1907 – 1991))

By 1891, they were staying at the house of his father-in-law Frederick Haynes, a solicitor's clerk. By 1898, Sparshott had residences at Wimbledon and The Strand. According to the 1901 Census, Sparshott, his wife Laura, four of their children, one child from his first marriage (William Romaine, a ledger clerk), and three servants were living at 18 Queen's Road, South Wimbledon, Surrey. By 1911, Sparshott, his second wife, and five of the eight surviving children of that marriage were living at 9 Grosvenor Hill, Eureka, Wimbledon, London.

=== Retirement and death ===
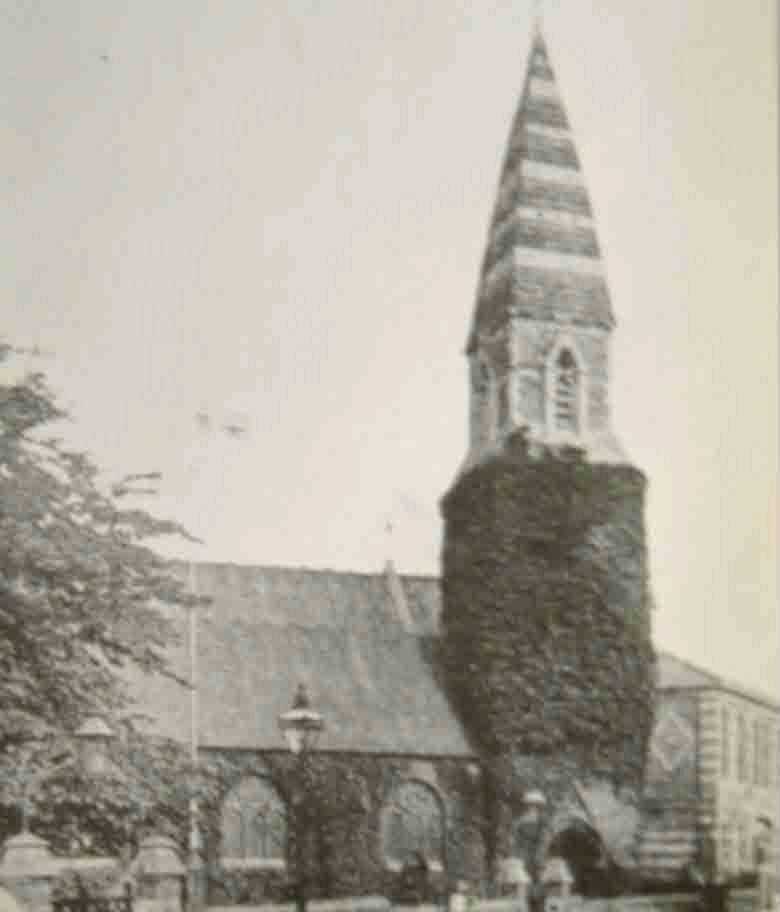
St Andrew's Church, Hastings

In 1920, having completed his service at Weybread Church, Sparshott retired to Hastings, where in 1921 he was recorded living with his wife Laura, and two of their daughters, Clarrie a schoolteacher, and Rosalie, still at school. He lived there for the rest of his life, remaining active in church matters to the end. A few days before his death, he "took part in the meetings at the Priory-Street Institute in connection with the world's Evangelical Alliance Week of Prayer". Sparshott died in Hastings on 10 January 1927. (Note: GRO index: Deaths Mar 1927 Sparshott Thomas H. 85 Hastings 2b 37) He was buried on 13 January 1927 in St Andrew's churchyard, Hastings, after a choral service in the church. There were "many present" at the funeral, including the St Andrew's Women's Meeting, of which his wife was the leader. St Andrew's Church was demolished in 1970.

== Career ==
Sparshott began his working life as a cooper in his father's hardware business, and was still working there in 1861, possibly to pay for his theological training.

=== Training and ordination ===
Sparshott was trained at the Church Missionary Society College, Islington, from 1864, graduating in 1867. He was ordained deacon in 1867 by the Bishop of London for colonial work, and ordained priest in 1871 by the Bishop of Mauritius.

=== Missionary service ===
Sparshott was a missionary of the Church Mission Society (CMS), serving for eight years and six months. He may have gained his nickname, "Rev Tom", during this period. His first placement, between 7 September 1867 and 2 June 1872, was in Kisuldini in the Seychelles (then part of Mauritius) and elsewhere in East Africa, including Zanzibar. He then returned to England. Between 6 October 1873 and 24 September 1875 he served in Mombasa, Kenya, then returned again to England. His connexion with the CMS was closed on 25 April 1876.

=== Service in England ===
Sparshott was organising secretary of the Church Association for eighteen years, from 1881 to c. 1899. This involved lecturing and preaching "all over England". He was its deputation secretary from 1893.

Sparshott was curate of St Nicholas Church, Buckenham, Norfolk, from 1872 to 1873. He was temporary junior curate of Hexham Abbey Church in 1876. He was curate of St Nicholas Church, Swafield, Norfolk, from 1876 to 1877, then of St Mary's Church, Syderstone, Norfolk, from 1877 to 1879. From 1879 to 1889, he was domestic chaplain to George Cholmondeley, 4th Marquess of Cholmondeley, at Cholmondeley Castle, Cheshire, for which he received a benefice. He "resigned his appointment in order to accept a more active sphere of work at Salisbury". Between 1890 and 1891, he was temporary curate of St Mary's Church, Luddenden, Halifax, covering the illness of its vicar, Rev. James Moore. In Halifax he was "recalled locally ... for his powerful evangelical preaching". Between 1892 and 1894, he was chaplain of Princess Mary's Village Homes, in Addlestone, Surrey. This was a home for daughters of women prisoners. Between 1911 and 1920, he was vicar of St Andrew's Church, Weybread, Suffolk.

=== Churches and institutions served by Sparshott ===
Church Association van for proselytising

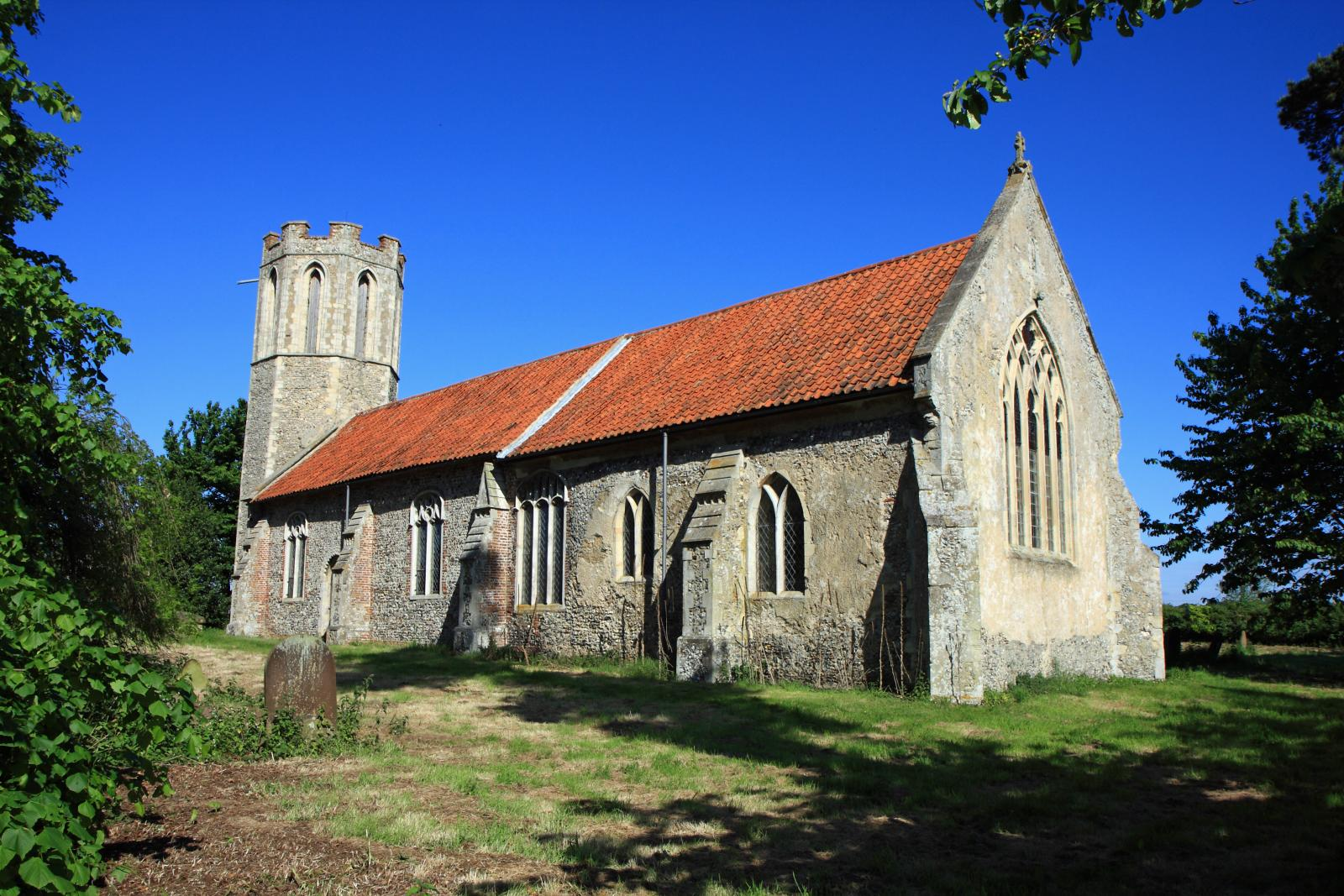
St Nicholas, Buckenham

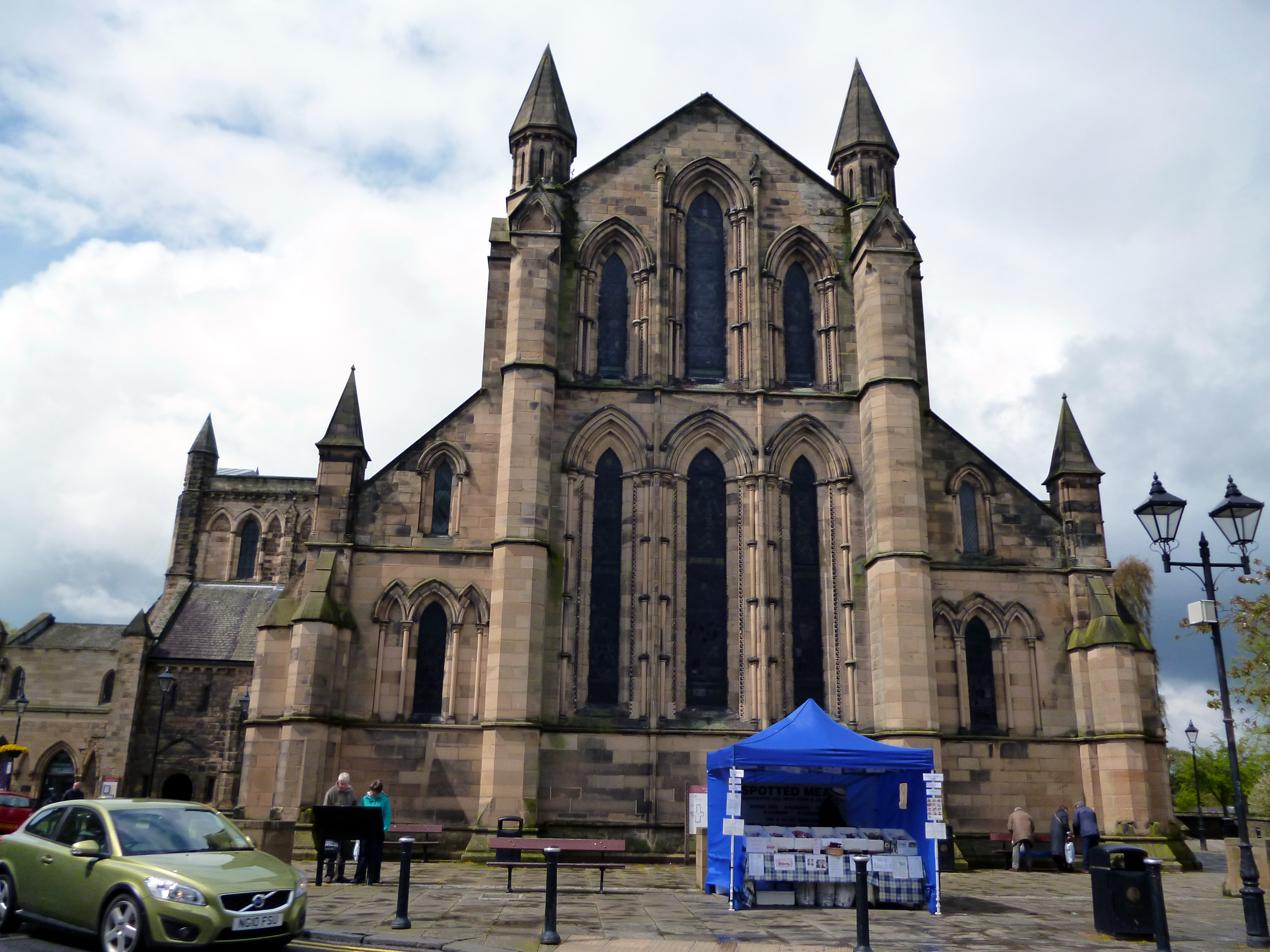
Hexham Abbey

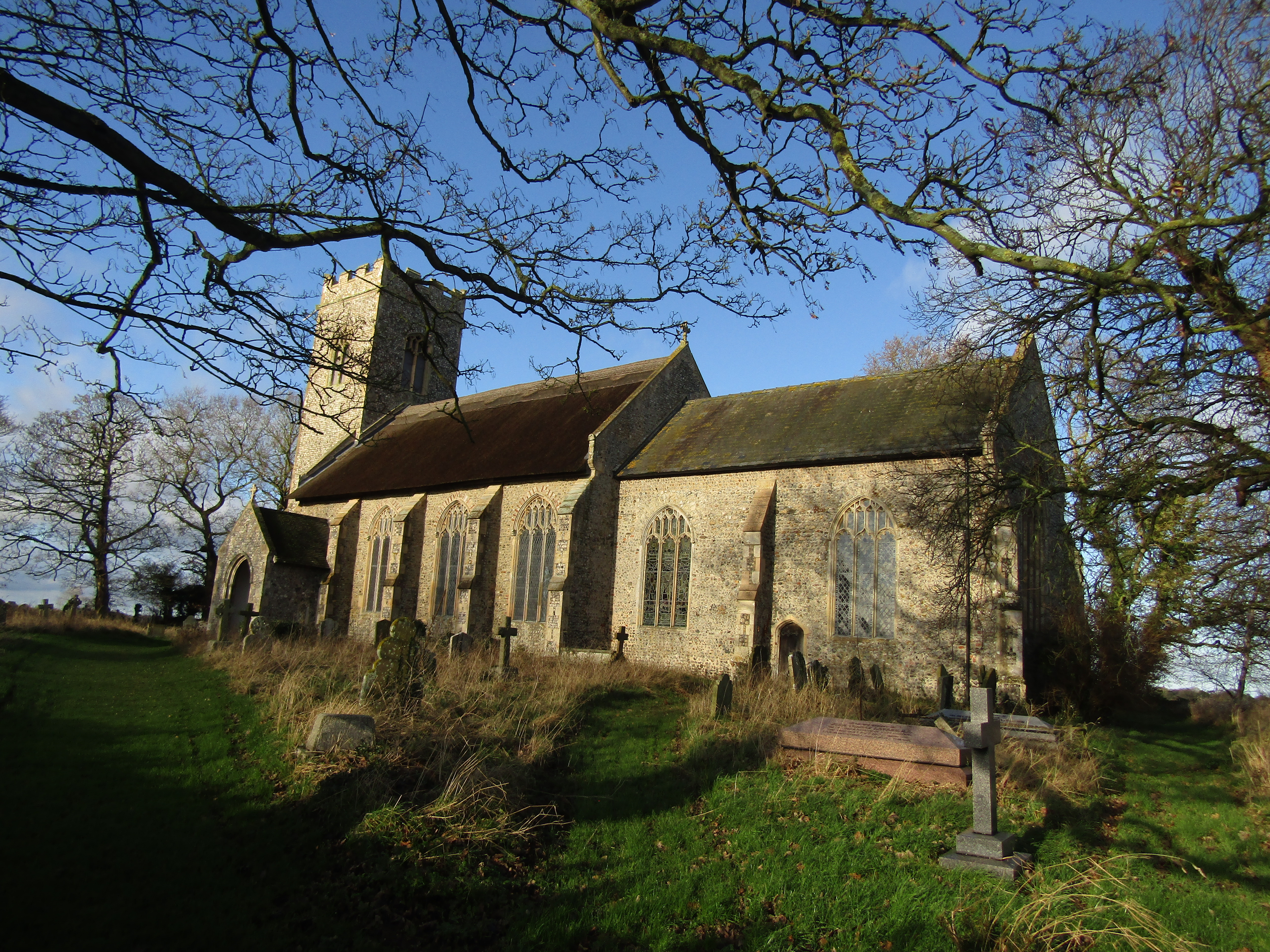
St Nicholas, Swafield

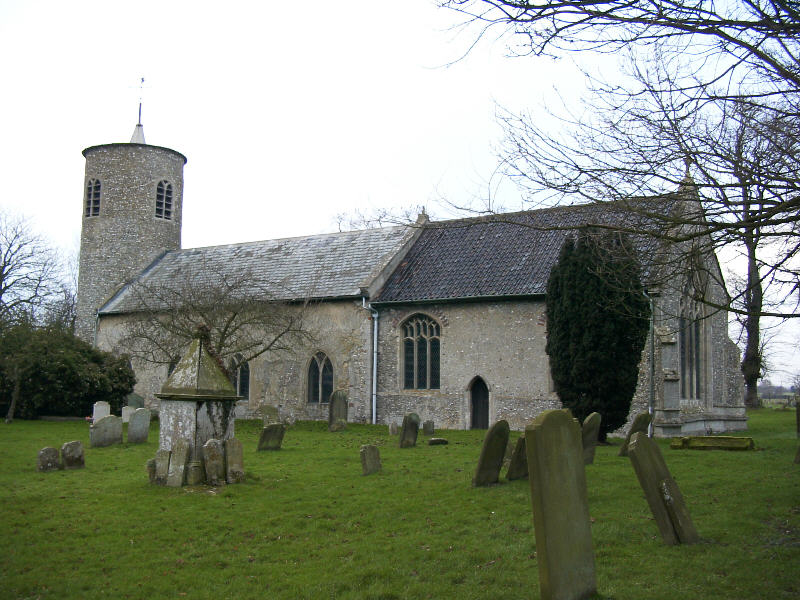
St Mary, Syderstone

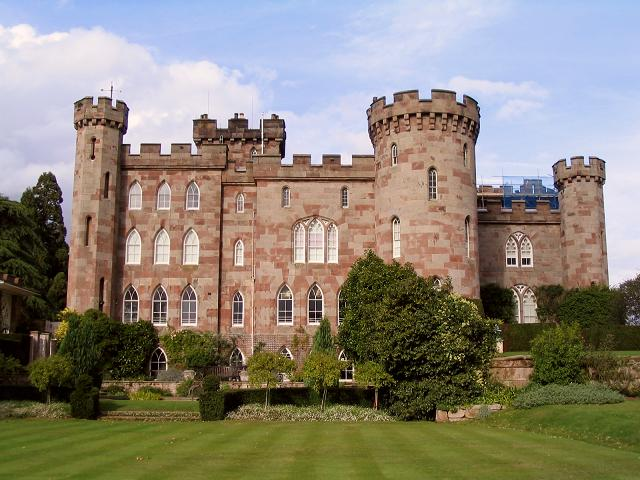
Cholmondeley Castle

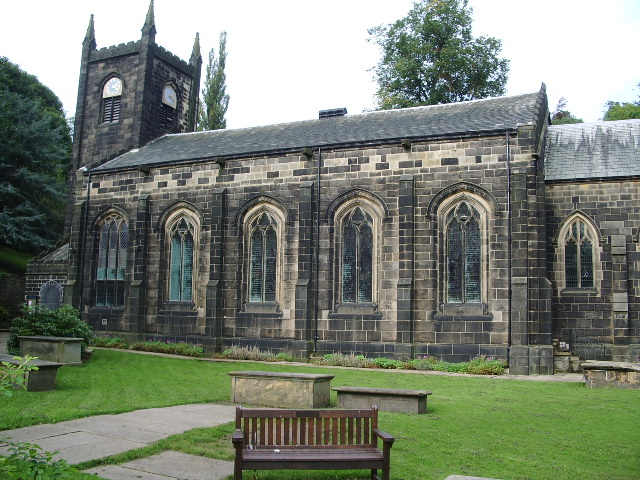
St Mary, Luddenden

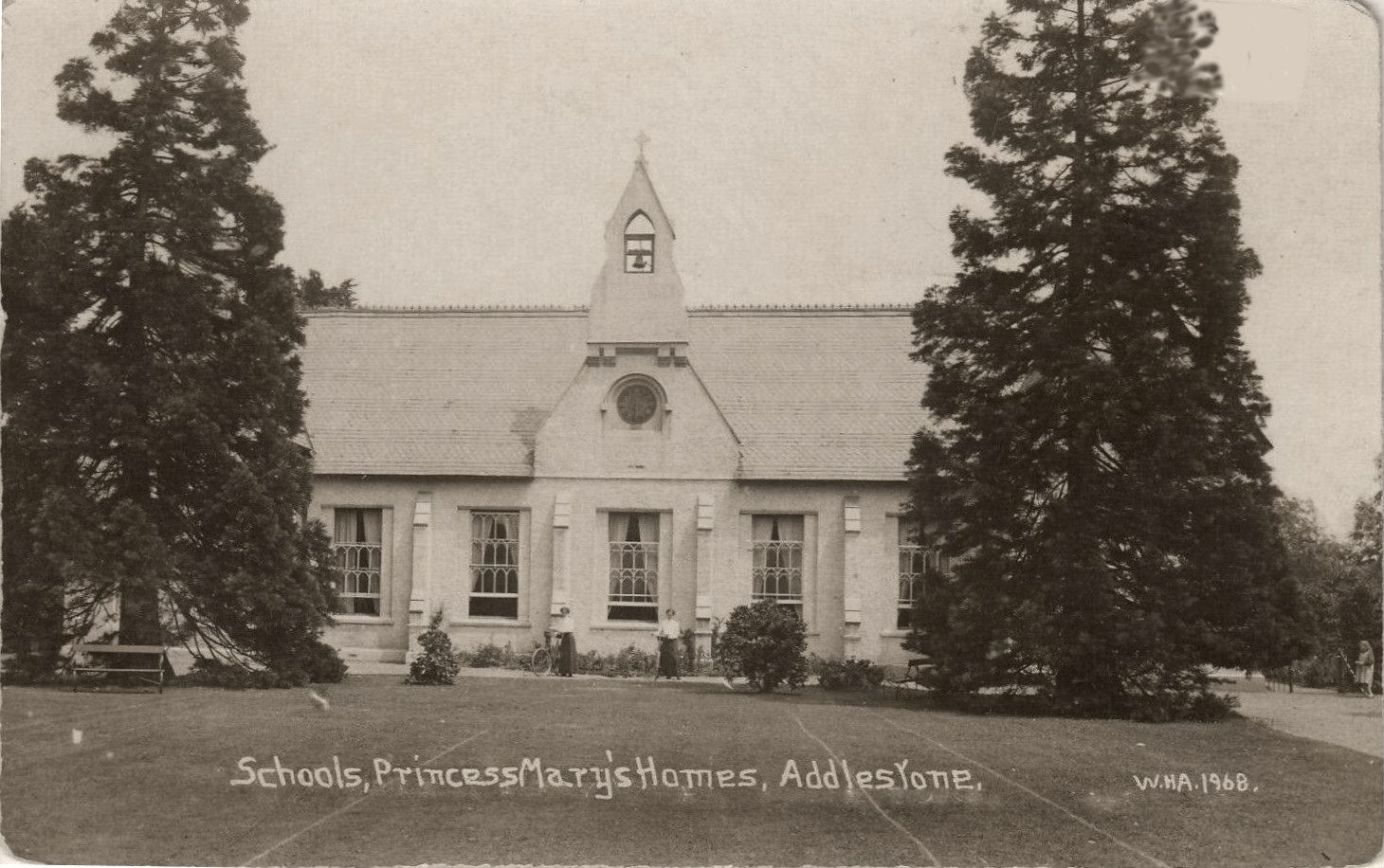
Princess Mary's Village Homes, Addlestone

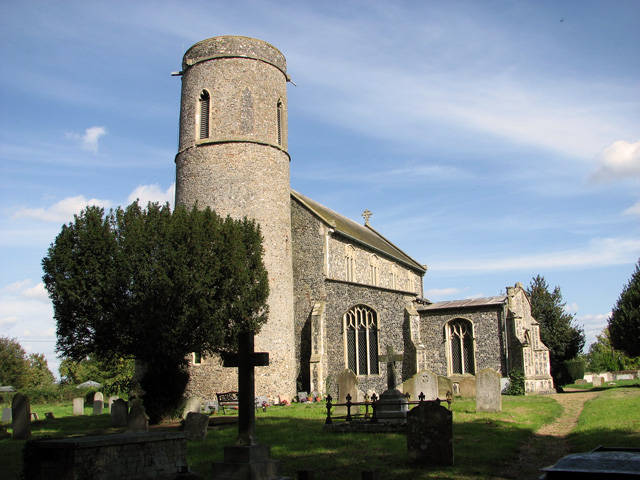
St Andrew, Weybread

=== Church politics ===
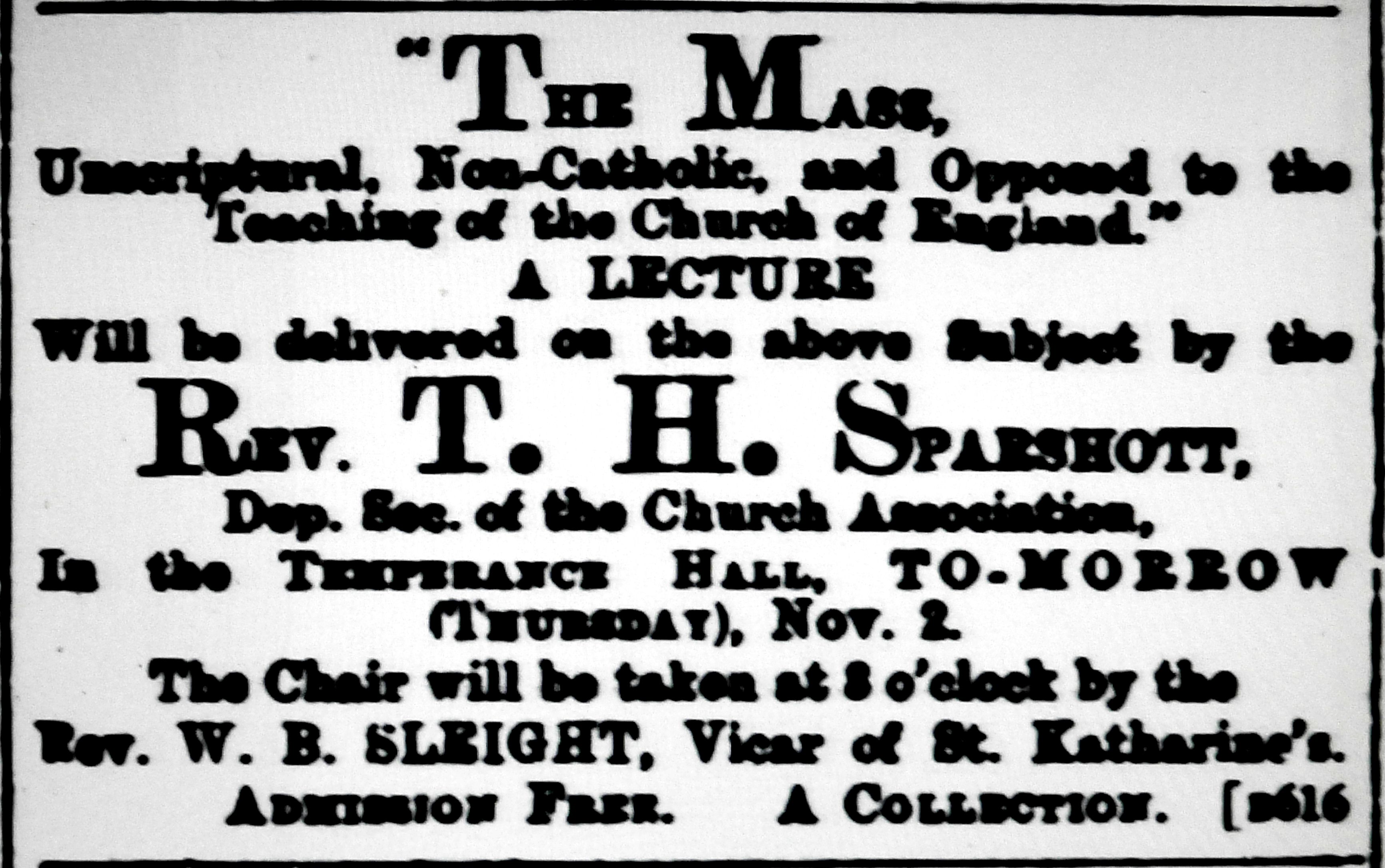
Advertisement for a lecture by T.H. Sparshott

Sparshott was a vocal antagonist against the Oxford Movement, and he gave lectures on the subject. In November 1890 he spoke strongly at a Church Association meeting, saying that "the Evangelical party ... were in very great danger of the bishops" of the Oxford Movement. In October 1893 he gave a lecture described as being "on priesthood", in Sheffield. On 1 November of the same year, his lecture in Northampton was announced as The Mass, Unscriptural, Non-Catholic and Opposed to the Teaching of the Church of England. Sparshott repeated the lecture to a "not very numerous" audience in Southampton on 22 November. As organising deputation secretary of the Church Association, he published a letter in the Grantham Journal in 1897 on the definition of "priest". He said that instead of priests being sacrificers of masses for the dead, as they were before the Reformation, as Anglicans they were now just presbyters, or evangelists. This gave rise to some controversy. In the same vein, in 1901 in Staines, he gave a lecture titled, Ritualism, the Highway to Rome, saying that the Bible, not ribbons on clerical robes, was the source for his beliefs. At a Church Association meeting in Rugby in November 1893, Sparshott spoke on the subject of the dispute between the English Church Union, whom he called "ritualists", and the Church Association.

== Publications and other writings ==
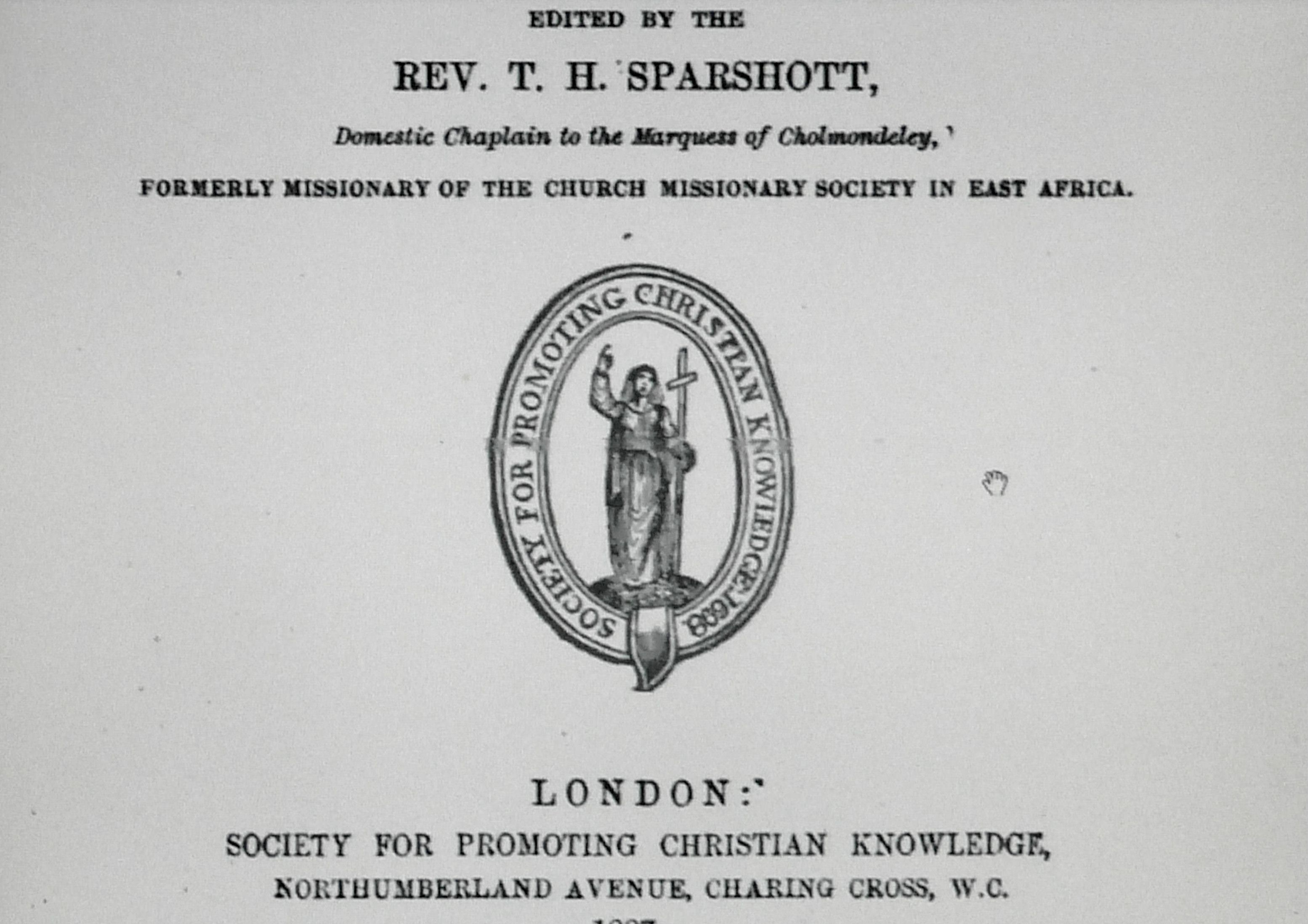
From the title page of A Nika-English Dictionary

- Sparshott, Rev. T.H. (1865). "Church Association Tract 201: The Universities' Mission to Central Africa". Church Association Tracts. 4.
- Sparshott, Rev. T.H. (1865). "Church Association Tract 273: What is Protestantism?" (PDF). Church Association Tracts. 6.
- Rebman, John; Steere, Edward (1881). Sparshott, Rev. Thomas Henry (ed.). Anjili kwa Luka (Swaheli) [Gospel of Luke] (in Swahili). British and Foreign Bible Society. (Note: This book is listed in the British Library as: "Anjili kwa Luka. Swaheli. (Translated by Rev. J. Rebmann ... Spelling altered by Right Rev. Bishop Steere. Edited by Rev. T. H. Sparshott.). London : B. & F.B.S., 1881".)
- Krapf, Dr Johann Ludwig; Rebmann, Rev. Johannes (1887). Sparshott, Rev. Thomas Henry (ed.). A Nika-English Dictionary. London: Society for promoting Christian knowledge. (Subject: Mijikenda languages).
- The British Library has the following unpublished material in its collection: Kenya Mission: Original papers: Letters and papers of individual missionaries Rev. Thomas Henry Sparshott (1868).
