= St Nicholas Church, Buckenham =

Coordinates: 52.5996°N 1.4771°E

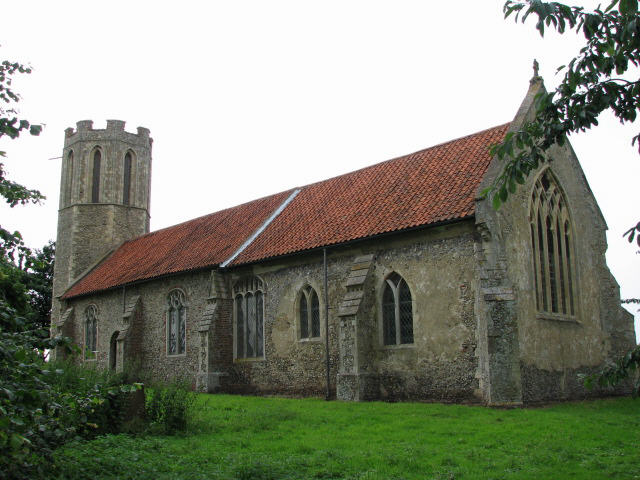
- St Nicholas Church from the southeast

- Location in Norfolk
- OS grid reference: TG 356 058
- Location: Buckenham, Norfolk
- Country: England
- Denomination: Anglican
- Website: Churches Conservation Trust

History
- Dedication: Saint Nicholas

Architecture
- Functional status: Redundant
- Heritage designation: Grade I
- Designated: 25 September 1962
- Architectural type: Church
- Style: Norman, Gothic

Specifications
- Materials: Flint, conglomerate and brick Limestone dressings Tiled roofs

St Nicholas Church is a redundant Anglican church in the village of Buckenham, Norfolk, England. It is recorded in the National Heritage List for England as a designated Grade I listed building, and is under the care of the Churches Conservation Trust. The church stands among fields to the north of the River Yare.

== History ==
The church dates from the 13th century, with additions and alterations since. It was restored in the early 19th century. During the 1960s and 1970s it suffered from decay and vandalism, but repairs have been carried out since it was vested with the Churches Conservation Trust. Reverend Thomas Henry Sparshott was curate of this church between 1872 and 1873.

== Architecture ==
=== Exterior ===
St Nicholas is constructed in flint, with some conglomerate and brick, and has limestone dressings. The roofs are tiled. Its plan consists of a nave, a chancel with a north vestry (previously a porch), and a west tower. The tower is wholly octagonal. In each face of the upper stage of the tower is a lancet, and there is another lancet on the west side at a lower level. The parapet is battlemented. The tower has a west doorway in Norman style, which has possibly been re-set from elsewhere in the church. It has scalloped capitals, and zig-zag decoration on the arch. Inside the upper part of the tower is a 17th-century dovecote lined with brick nesting boxes. On the south side, between the tower and the nave, is a brick stair turret. The nave windows have two lights with Decorated tracery. Between the windows on the south side is another Norman doorway, again with zig-zag decoration. The north and south walls of the chancel have two-light windows with Y-tracery, and three-light windows with Perpendicular tracery. The east window has five lights. The east gable is decorated with grotesque carvings, and above the east window is head-corbel and a blocked niche. The vestry has two-light north and south windows. In the north wall of the nave is an Early English doorway, with dog-tooth ornament. Around the church are stepped buttresses.

=== Interior ===
The nave and chancel have panelled ceilings with stencilled decorations. The tower screen dates from the 19th century and is in Perpendicular style. On the south wall of the chancel are a trefoil-headed piscina and a sedilia, and on the north wall is a monument dated 1707. The communion rail is in stone and dates from the 19th century. At the foot of the altar steps are early coffin slabs set in the floor. The pulpit and box pews date from the 18th century. The font is from the 15th century. It has an octagonal bowl, each face being carved with a seated figure under an ogee arch. The stem has carved figures, four standing and four seated. The church's bell was cast in about 1290. It was one of the oldest bells in East Anglia, but was stolen in the 1970s. The stained glass is by S. C. Yarington of Norwich. Much of this was damaged during the 1970s, but some has been recovered and re-set in the upper parts of the windows.

== See also ==
- List of churches preserved by the Churches Conservation Trust in the East of England
