= Syderstone =

Civil parish in Norfolk, England

Coordinates: 52.85996°N 0.71667°E

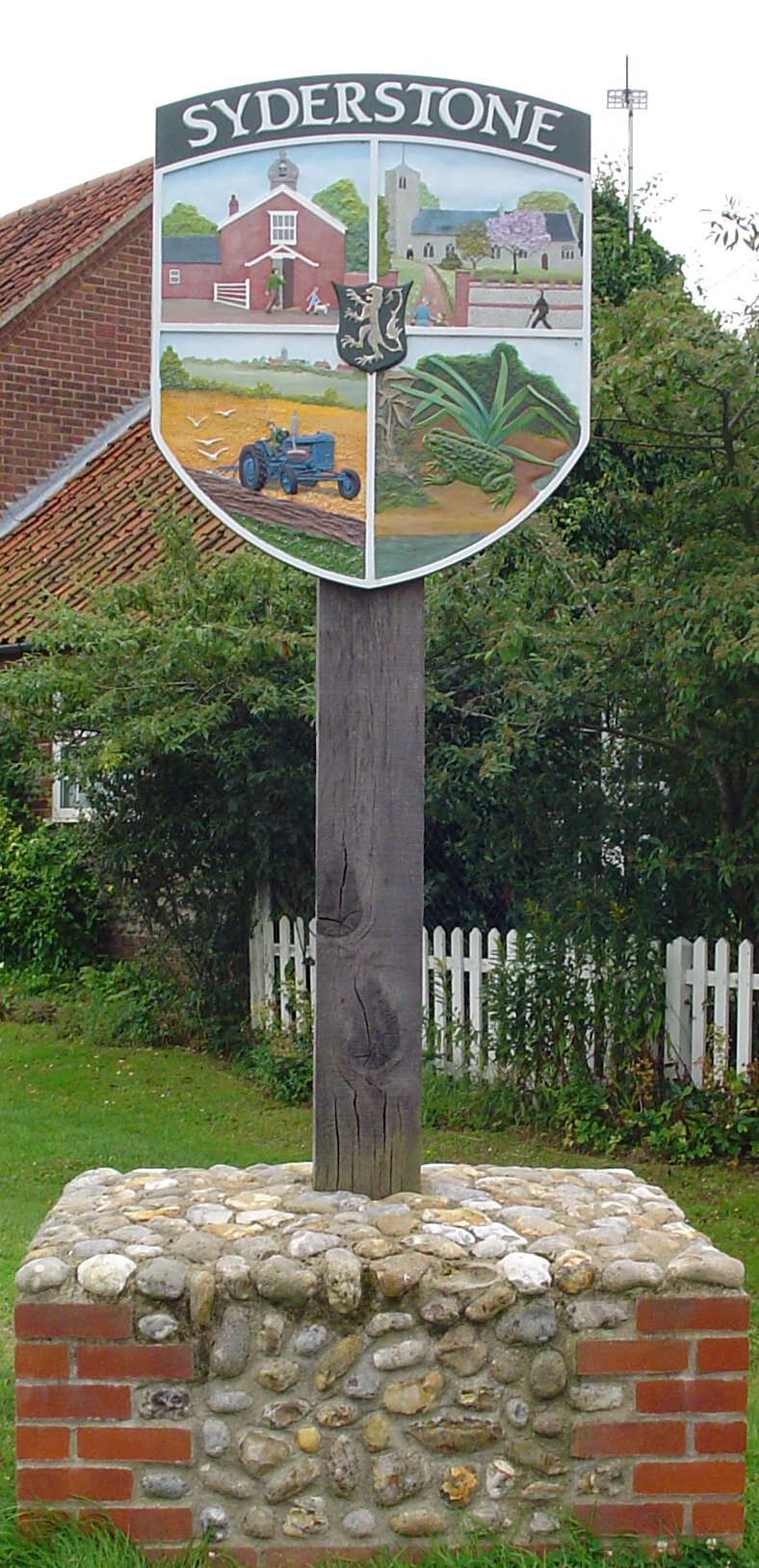
- Signpost in Syderstone

- Location within Norfolk
- Area: 9.94 km^{2} (3.84 sq mi)
- Population: 445
  - Density: 45/km^{2} (120/sq mi)
- OS grid reference: TF829326
- Civil parish: Syderstone
- District: King's Lynn and West Norfolk
- Shire county: Norfolk
- Region: East
- Country: England
- Sovereign state: United Kingdom
- Post town: KING'S LYNN
- Postcode district: PE31
- Police: Norfolk
- Fire: Norfolk
- Ambulance: East of England

Syderstone is a civil parish in the English county of Norfolk, near the town of Fakenham. It has an area of 9.94 km^{2} (3.84 sq mi). The population of 532 in 224 households at the 2001 census fell to 445 at the 2011 Census.

== Governance ==
For the purposes of local government, Syderstone falls within the Norfolk district of King's Lynn and West Norfolk.

== Churches ==
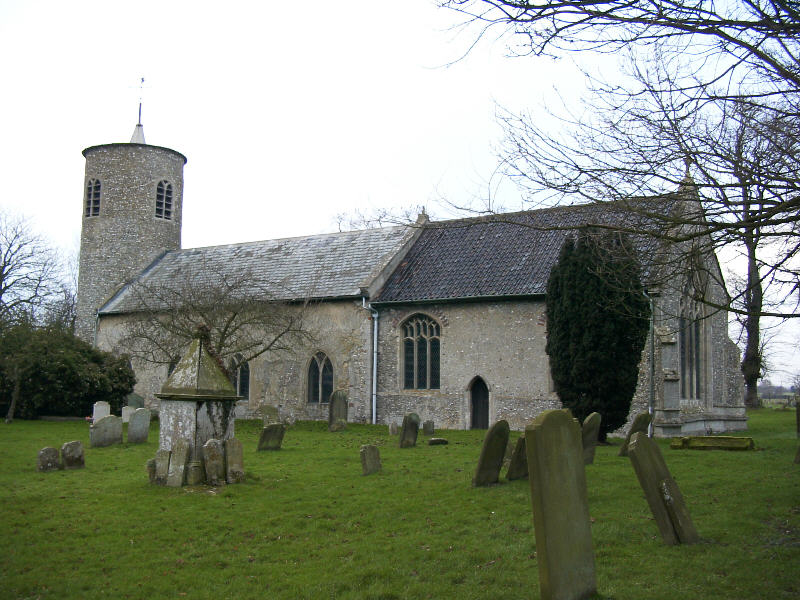
Syderstone St. Mary

St Mary's, the parish church, is one of 124 round-tower churches in Norfolk, as is the nearby church at Barmer. St Mary's has a service every Sunday at various times.

In its present form the church has its origins in the Norman period, but may date from earlier. It was remodelled and reduced in size in 1785, and underwent major restoration and refurnishing in 1859.

The initials "A. R." on the church gates refer to Amy Robsart, whose family were lords of the manor. She and her husband, Robert Dudley, later Earl of Leicester, lived for a time at Syderstone Hall, which no longer stands. She died young amid rumours that her husband had poisoned her. She provided the basis for a novel, Kenilworth, by Sir Walter Scott. The village hall is named after her.

== Wildlife ==
It is famous for the natterjack toads which have been seen near the popular but overgrown duck pond. Syderstone is also known for its large common, which spans roughly 4 square miles (10 km^{2}). Much wildlife can be seen there including snakes, hares, rabbits and foxes.

In a field alongside the road that passes the duck pond there is a World War II Home Guard pill box. On a bright spring day in 1944 or 1945 two P-51 Mustangs collided over Barwick Hall Farm near Stanhoe. One of the Mustangs crashed on Syderstone Common, killing the pilot.
