= Castle Armoury =

Military installation in England

- Bury
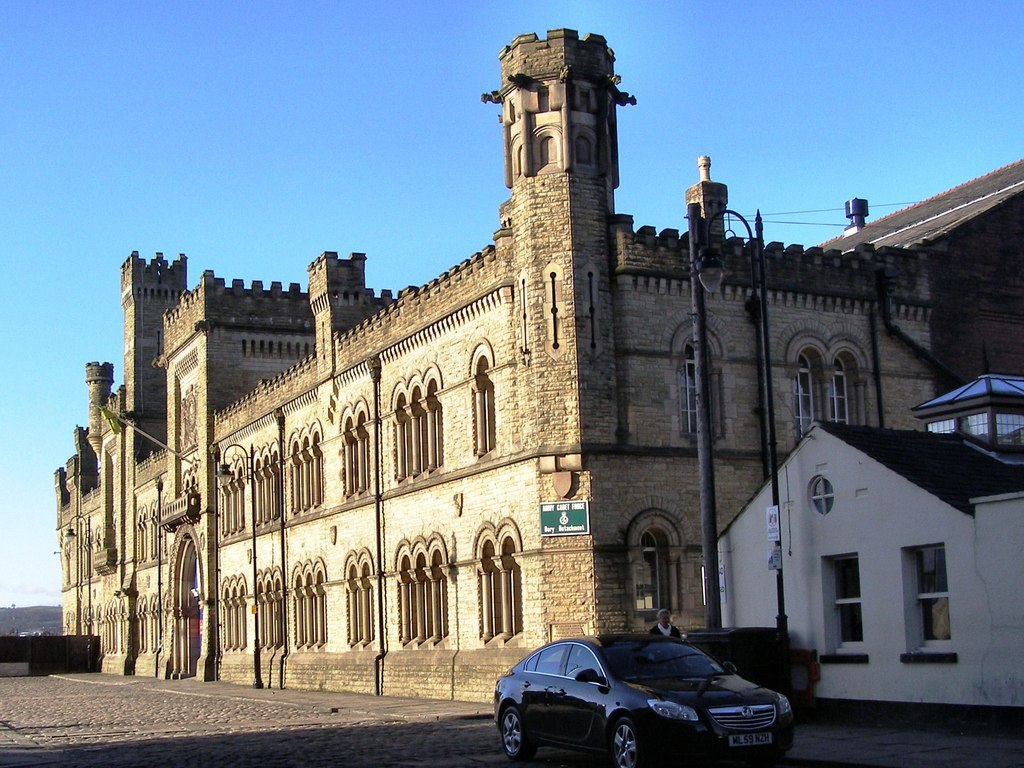
- Castle Armoury

Site information
- Type: Barracks
- Owner: Ministry of Defence
- Operator: British Army

Location
- Location within Greater Manchester
- Coordinates: 53.59422°N 2.29859°W

Site history
- Built: 1868
- Built for: War Office
- In use: 1868-

Garrison information
- Occupants: W company 5th Battalion, Royal Regiment of Fusiliers; B Detachment, 207 (Manchester) Field Hospital; Bury Detachment ACF; 1036 (Bury) Squadron ATC

The Castle Armoury is a military installation in Bury, Greater Manchester, England.

== History ==
The armoury was designed as the headquarters of the 8th Lancashire Rifle Volunteer Corps and built on the remains of Bury Castle in 1868. An extension exhibiting the same architectural features was opened by the Duke of Connaught in November 1907. The 8th Lancashire Rifle Volunteer Corps evolved to become the 1st Volunteer Battalion, the Lancashire Fusiliers in 1883 and the 5th Battalion, the Lancashire Fusiliers in 1908. The battalion was mobilised at the armoury in September 1914 before being deployed to the Suez Canal, then to Gallipoli and ultimately to the Western Front. The armoury remained the home of the 5th battalion, the Lancashire Fusiliers through the inter-war period.

A major fire took hold at the armoury in January 1943 during the Second World War, in which a fireman died and the building was seriously damaged, and it was not until summer 1952 that the restoration was complete. After the war the armoury continued to be used by the 5th battalion the Lancashire Fusiliers until the battalion was disbanded in 1967. The armoury was then used by a company of the 5th Battalion the Royal Regiment of Fusiliers, a unit which evolved following amalgamations to become the Lancastrian and Cumbrian Volunteers in July 1999 and 4th Battalion the Duke of Lancaster's Regiment in July 2006. It is a Grade II Listed building.

The building closed in June 2022 with the owners, a trust, citing safety grounds. The leaser, the Ministry of Defence's Reserve Forces' and Cadets' Association stated that funding was not available to carry out the estimated £2 million of urgent repairs, with further work required to modernise the building.

== Former units ==
The following units were based at the armoury immediately before its closure:

British Army

- W (Gallipoli) Company, 5th Battalion, Royal Regiment of Fusiliers
- B Detachment, 207 (Manchester) Field Hospital, Royal Army Medical Corps
- Lancashire Band and Corps of Drums of the Royal Regiment of Fusiliers

Community Cadet Forces

- Bury Detachment, Greater Manchester Army Cadet Force
- 1036 (Bury) Squadron, Greater Manchester Wing, Air Training Corps

== See also ==
- Listed buildings in Bury
