= 12th (Duke of Lancaster's Own Yeomanry) Battalion, Manchester Regiment =

12th (Service) Battalion, Manchester Regiment 12th (DLOY) Battalion, Manchester Regiment
- Active: 7 October 1914–20 May 1919
- Country: United Kingdom
- Branch: New Army
- Type: Infantry
- Size: Battalion
- Part of: 17th (Northern) Division
- Garrison/HQ: Ladysmith Barracks, Ashton-under-Lyne
- Engagements: The Bluff; Mametz Wood; Battle of Delville Wood; Battle of Arras; Battle of Passchendaele; German Spring Offensive; Second Battle of the Somme; Battle of Épehy; Second Battle of Cambrai; Battle of the Selle; Battle of the Sambre

The 12th (Service) Battalion, Manchester Regiment, was a unit of 'Kitchener's Army' formed immediately after the outbreak of the First World War. It saw action in the Ypres Salient in 1915–16, on the Somme in 1916, including actions at Mametz Wood and the Battle of Delville Wood, and in the Arras Offensive. It was then amalgamated with the dismounted cavalry of the Manchester-based Duke of Lancaster's Own Yeomanry (DLOY) to become the 12th (DLOY) Battalion, Manchester Regiment. It continued serving on the Western Front until the Armistice with Germany, including the Battle of Passchendaele, the German Spring Offensive and the final Allied Hundred Days Offensive.

== 12th (Service) Battalion ==
=== Recruitment ===
Alfred Leete's recruitment poster for Kitchener's Army.

On 6 August 1914, less than 48 hours after Britain's declaration of war, Parliament sanctioned an increase of 500,000 men for the Regular British Army, and the newly appointed Secretary of State for War, Earl Kitchener of Khartoum issued his famous call to arms: 'Your King and Country Need You', urging the first 100,000 volunteers to come forward. This group of six divisions with supporting arms became known as Kitchener's First New Army, or 'K1'. A flood of volunteers poured into the recruiting offices across the country and were formed into 'Service' battalions of the county regiments. So many came forward that the 'K1' battalions were quickly filled and the recruitment of 'K2' units was authorised on 11 September. The Manchester Regiment's K2 battalion was raised in September and officially became the 12th (Service) Battalion at Ladysmith Barracks, Ashton-under-Lyne, on 7 October 1914.

=== Training ===
The battalion was assigned to 52nd Brigade of 17th (Northern) Division, which was assembling round Wareham, Dorset. 12th Battalion was billeted at Wool. For some time no uniforms were available for the men, and even blankets were scarce in the improvised billets and in the tented camps erected in October. That month some old uniforms were supplied, and the men paraded in peacetime red coats with civilian headgear and overcoats. For months there were only a few drill-pattern rifles with which to train, and machine guns had to be represented by dummy guns. The onset of winter weather in November drove the brigade into hastily erected huts at Bovington Camp outside Wool. However, before the end of 1914 the infantry were equipped with old pattern magazine Lee–Enfield rifles and a 'generous' supply of ammunition allowed elementary musketry training to begin. In December 52nd Bde moved to Wimborne, then back to Wool in March 1915. In that month the division received a limited issue of Short Magazine Lee–Enfield Mk III service rifles and new leather equipment. Between 27 May and 1 June the division marched to Flowerdown outside Winchester, with 12th Manchesters at Hursley Park. The division underwent final intensive battle training at Flowerdown.

On 5 July the division was informed that it would be retained in England for some time on home defence. However, this was rescinded at midnight the same day and it was ordered to embark for the Western Front from 12 July. Mobilisation was completed and the advance parties left for the front. 12th Manchesters entrained at Winchester on 15 July and embarked at Folkestone at midnight. It landed at Boulogne next day with a strength of 30 officers and 945 other ranks (ORs) under the command of Lieutenant-Colonel E.G. Harrison, and marched to join the division, which was concentrating south of Saint-Omer.

=== Ypres ===
17th (Northern) Division moved up to the front on 19 July and joined V Corps under Second Army in the Ypres Salient. The battalions were then sent into the line for instruction in Trench warfare. On 23 July 12th Manchesters was attached by platoons to the Liverpool Scottish serving with 3rd Division. On 30 July the battalion marched to White Chateau and bivouacked before taking over its own section of the line near Hooge on the night of 1/2 August. Sporadic fighting had been going on for some weeks round the ruins of Hooge Chateau. After a few quiet days the battalion began digging a trench in front of its parapet and its own barbed wire. This was part of a diversion by 17th (N) Division created a diversion for an attack by 6th Division on 9 August. The new trenches in front and behind the line looked like jumping-off trenches and assembly trenches. These obvious preparations drew German artillery fire onto the division's own front and communication trenches. 6th Division's limited attack was notably well planned and executed, recapturing the big Hooge Crater and the stables of the chateau.

The battalion settled down to the routine of spells in the front line alternating with reserve positions, providing working parties, and occasional trench raids, such as one carried out by 12th Manchesters n 'Gravel Farm' on 17 September. 17th (N) Division was not engaged in any major actions for the rest of the year. On 14 February 1916 the division was holding the line astride the Ypres–Comines Canal including 'The Bluff', a spoilheap left after the construction of the canal that provided the best observation post in the area. A German attack captured the Bluff, while 12th Manchesters south of the canal came under heavy bombardment, leading to the cancellation of a planned relief that night. Next day A Company moved into a redoubt in the British line, where they suffered heavy casualties from shellfire. The battalion was finally relieved on 20/21 February; it was still in the rest camp when the rest of the division took part in a set-piece attack that recovered the Bluff.

In late March the division moved south to the Armentières sector, with 12th Mancehsters moving into the front line on 22 March. The German artillery was very active in this area. In mid-May 12 Manchesters introduced the 2nd Battalion Otago Regiment of the newly arrived New Zealand Division to the sector before handing over to them. On 15 May 12th Manchesters marched out to the Zudausques training area behind the lines, where it spent the next month.

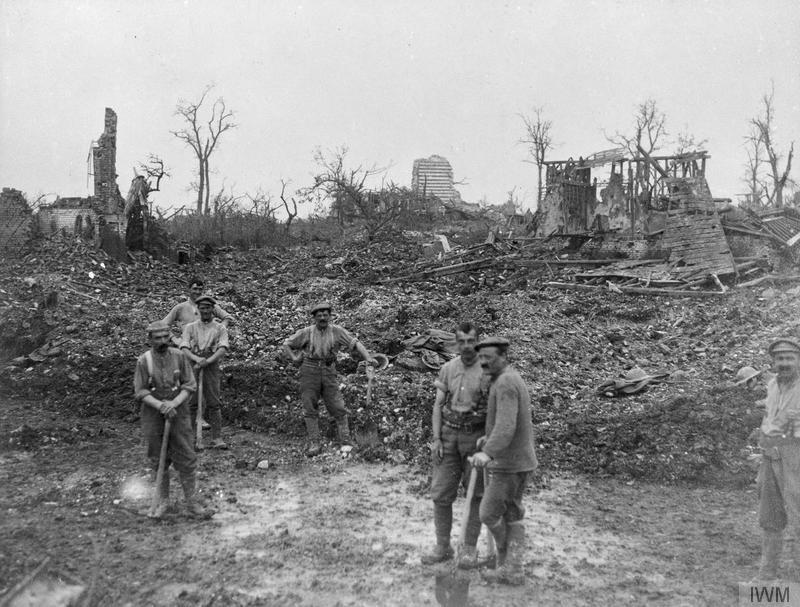
The ruins of Fricourt, July 1916.

=== Somme ===
The British Expeditionary Force (BEF) was preparing for that summer's 'Big Push' (the Battle of the Somme), and 17th (N) Division was sent to join the newly formed XV Corps for this offensive. 12th Manchesters entrained at Saint-Omer for Amiens on 12 June and then marched to Poulainville where it resumed training. On 27 June the battalion left its billets and marched to Heilly, moving into the Bois des Tailles on the night of 30 June. When the assault was launched next day 17th (N) Division was in reserve and 52nd Bde was not involved in the disastrous First day on the Somme. Next day the battalion 'stood to' at 15 minutes' notice, while 17th (N) Division occupied Fricourt without fighting. On the night of 3/4 July the battalion took over captured German trenches beyond the village and next morning supported the brigades' successful attack on Quadrangle Trench. On 7 July the division was ordered to advance about 500 yards (460 m) over open ground to take Quadrangle Support Trench. The attack was launched in the dark, but the Germans were ready and the leading battalions of 52nd Bde were thrown back. At 07.25 the 12th Manchesters and 9th Bn Duke of Wellington's Regiment were ordered to make a second attempt at 08.00 when the neighbouring formations made their main attack. With so little warning the attack began late and the protective artillery barrage lifted before the troops reached the enemy line. Machine gun fire from Mametz Wood cut down most of the first (B and D Companies) and second wave (C Company). As the Official History relates, 'in broad daylight the two battalions had no chance of reaching Quadrangle Support over bare and open ground'. Lieutenant-Col Harrison was wounded while superintending the withdrawal of the survivors. The battalion lost 15 officers and 539 ORs killed, wounded and missing (many of the wounded being captured).

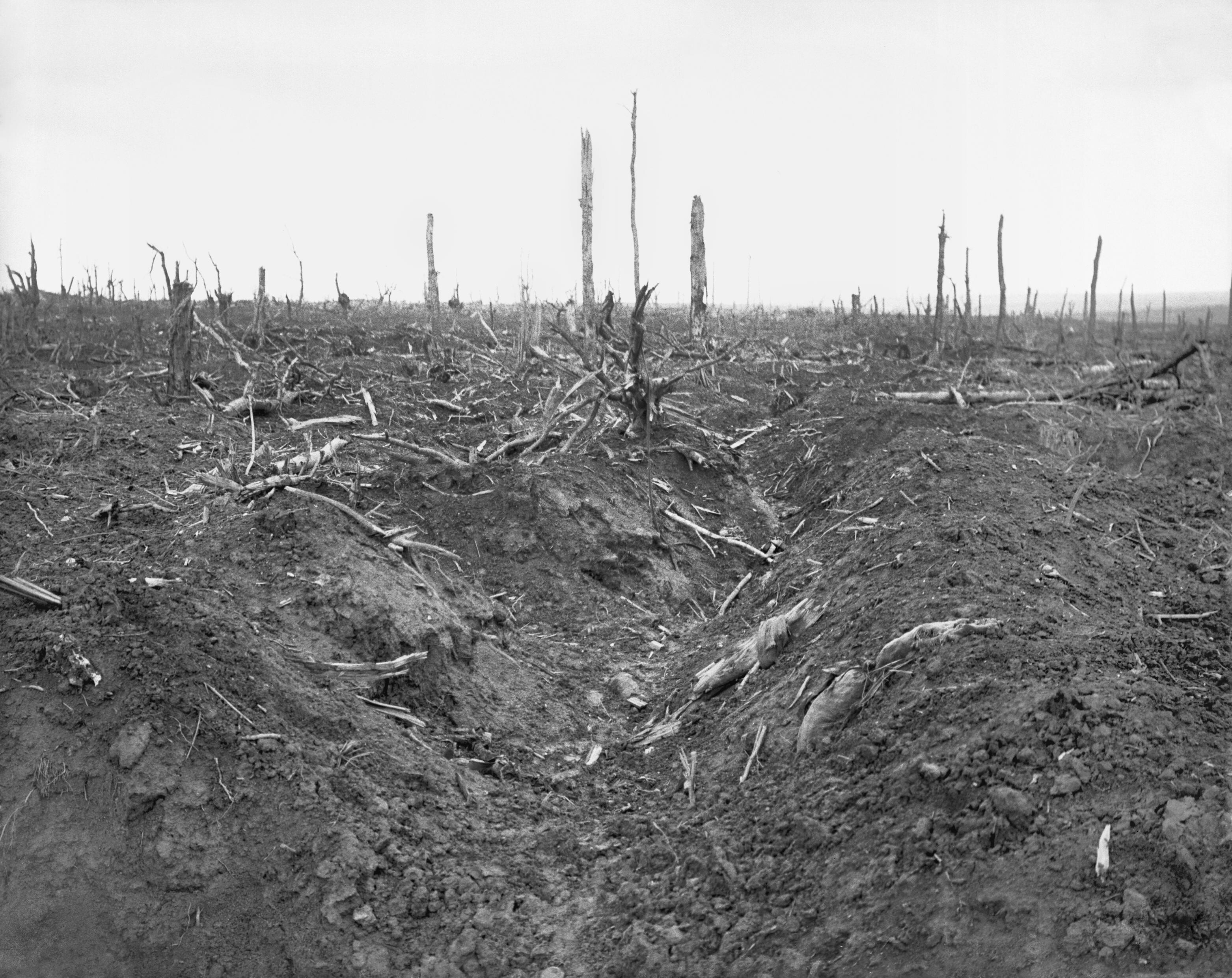
An abandoned German trench in Delville Wood near Longueval, September 1916.

12th Manchesters were relieved and sent by rail to Oissy to reorganise and refit. Major P.M. Magnay arrived to take command, together with large drafts of reinforcements. On 23 July the battalion moved back to bivouac near Albert as part of XV Corps' reserve. It rejoined 52nd Bde on 1 August, moving into brigade support in the old German second line trenches between Longueval and Bazentin-le-Petit. As part of the Battle of Delville Wood, 52nd Bde was ordered to attack Orchard Trench (running into the wood) at 00:40 on 4 August. 12th Manchesters and 9th Bn Northumberland Fusiliers led. The field artillery laid down an intense 5-minute barrage before Zero hour, but the German artillery caught the attackers with high explosive and gas shells and their machine guns opened up. Communications were cut, and it was not until 04.35 that Divisional HQ learned of the failure of the attack and the heavy casualties incurred. (The battalion's casualties for August were five officers and 169 ORs.)

Once again the battalion was withdrawn into reserve and went to Carnoy to reorganise. It provided some working parties and did some trench holding, but on 11 August was pulled out and sent to Souastre. By the end of the month it was trench-holding in a quiet sector. At the end of September it began intensive training and returned to the frontline trenches near Le Transloy on 30 October, where part of the division captured Zenith Trench on 2 November. In places the trenches were waist-deep in mud and suffered from sporadic German shelling. The offensive came to an end and 17th (N) Division was relieved in mid-November. 12th Manchesters went to Saisseval for rest and training.

12th Manchesters returned to the front in December, first in reserve at Guillemont, then holding the frontline trenches on the Ancre Heights from 25 December. There were some operations along the Ancre in early 1917, and 8 February 52nd Bde captured a trench overlooking Sailly-Saillisel. 12th Manchesters provided carrying parties (A Company) and garrisons for captured strongpoints (B Company) as counter-attacks were beaten off. The battalion suffered 54 casualties.

=== Arras ===
17th (N) Division spent the whole of March in reserve and training. It was transferred to Third Army for the forthcoming Battle of Arras, assigned to the Cavalry Corps for exploitation of any success. The battle began on 9 April and 12th Manchesters marched into billets in Arras that evening. As the fighting continued, 17th (N) Division was released to VI Corps on 11 April and it moved into the line, 12th Manchesters being in the divisional support trenches. On 13 April the battalion's trenches were heavily shelled and Lt-Col Magnay, the adjutant, the medical officer, and 14 other officers and ORs were wounded; Captain A.J. Moorhouse assumed command. The battalion remained in brigade reserve and constructing trenches on Orange Hill while the division waited to play its part in the fighting. The offensive was renewed on 23 April (the Second Battle of the Scarpe) and on the evening of 24 April 12th Manchesters took over the line north of Monchy Chateau Wood. At 03.30 next morning the battalion made a surprise attack on Rifle Trench, about 300–400 yards (270–370 m) away. The attack was made on a three-company front, with 9th West Riding Regiment cooperating. The enemy machine gunners detected the advance and opened up, but by 03.45 the battalion had taken the trench except at the right, where two platoons were held up 10 yards (9.1 m) short by a German strongpoint. These two platoons held out in shellholes all day until they ran out of ammunition and had lost three-quarters of their number. They then withdrew at dusk and C Company in support dug a strongpoint to guard that flank. Although the artillery response to SOS calls kept off German counter-attacks, 9th West Ridings had failed and 12th Manchesters had both flanks 'in the air'. It was relieved that night having lost 6 officers and 120 ORs.

The battalion went by train to Sus-Saint-Léger for rest and reorganisation. Major E.G.S Truell arrived to take command and was promoted to lieutenant-colonel. On 3 May the division moved into XVII Corps reserve, with 52nd Bde as divisional reserve. 12th Manchesters provided digging parties, then moved into the front line on 9 May. It was in support when the rest of 52nd Bde made an unsuccessful attack on 12 May, then held the front line for a few days. It had just been relieved on 16 May when the Germans put in a major attack from the chemical works at Rœux and it was called forward again. However, the attack was beaten off, and the battalion was not needed.

The Arras offensive was now effectively over. The battalion settled into the routine of trench-holding, patrolling, and providing working parties for the Royal Engineers (RE). There was a steady trickle of casualties from shellfire: on 26 June Maj A.J. Moorhouse, temporarily commanding the battalion again, was wounded and replaced by Maj G.L. Torrens of 10th Lancashire Fusiliers until Lt-Col Truell returned. Later Lt-Col T.W. Bullock took command. After several practices behind the lines, 12th Manchesters put in a large raid on 8 September against two opposing German trenches south of Gavrelle. Each company contributed 2 officers and 50 ORs. The divisional artillery provided a Box barrage and in conjunction with 93rd Field Company, RE, the raiders destroyed dugouts, machine guns and trench mortars. Although the raid was only partially successful (one trench could not be entered), it secured some prisoners as well. On 22 September the battalion marched to XVII Corps' rest camp at Hauteville.

== 12th (Duke of Lancaster's Own Yeomanry) Battalion ==
At Hauteville the battalion was reorganised. During the summer a number of Corps Cavalry Regiments had been disbanded and their men sent for infantry training. On 24 September a draft of 7 officers and 125 ORs from Regimental Headquarters, C and D Squadrons, 1/1st Duke of Lancaster's Own Yeomanry (DLOY) joined 12th (Service) Bn, which was redesignated 12th (Duke of Lancaster's Own Yeomanry) Battalion, Manchester Regiment. (Shortly after the outbreak of war the Manchester-based 1/1st DLOY of the Territorial Force had been broken up to form divisional cavalry squadrons. In 1916 those squadrons serving on the Western Front had rejoined in III Corps Cavalry Regiment).

After absorbing this draft, the battalion moved to Brévillers and began training for its next operation. 17th (N) Division was sent to take part in the Third Ypres Offensive and on 4 October 12 (DLOY) Battalion entrained for the Salient, where it resumed training.

=== Passchendaele ===
The Ypres offensive had already been in progress for two-and-a-half months when 17th (N) Division joined XIV Corps for the Second Battle of Passchendaele on 12 October. By now the mud was very bad, resulting in ragged artillery barrages fired from unsteady platforms, and painfully slow infantry advances. However, on this occasion 17th (N) Division was lucky: the supporting barrage was effective and the opposing Germans 'were in no mood' to face it. The division gained much of its objective despite the mud and casualties from snipers; 12th (DLOY) Bn spent most of the day in reserve. On 16/17 October it was relieved and went to Parroy Camp. The rear areas were raided nightly by German bombers, and the battalion suffered some casualties.

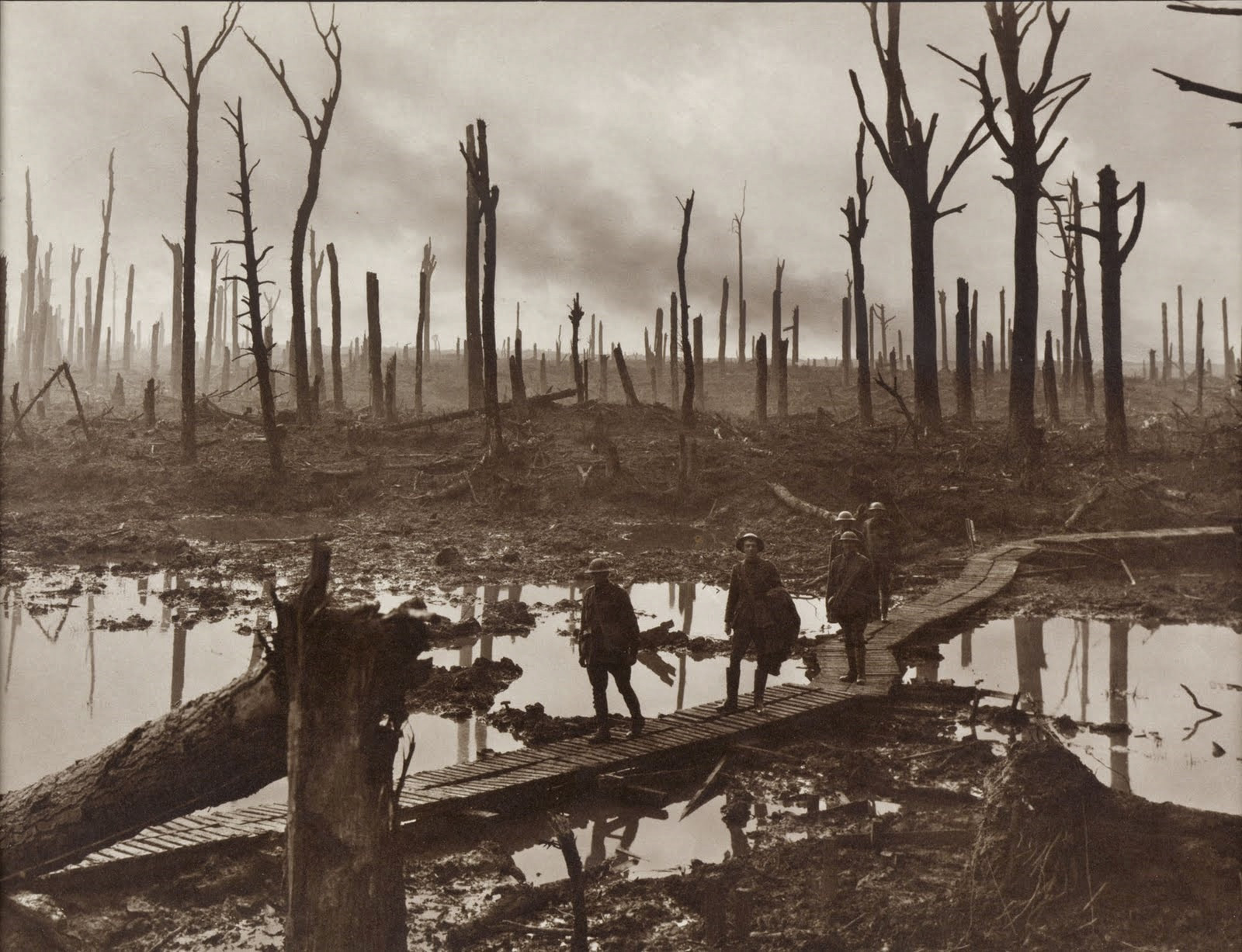
A duckboard track at Passchendaele

On 9 November, during the Second Battle of Passchendaele, the battalion re-entered the front line between 'Turenne Crossing' and 'Gravel Farm' at the Watervlietbeek stream. There were numerous casualties during the evening relief, with a heavy shell hitting C Company HQ and all the officers and HQ staff becoming casualties. Shortly after midnight the enemy put down a heavy barrage on Gravel Farm and rushed it: the whole of No 9 Platoon were killed or captured. A sergeant led No 12 Platoon in a counter-attack, but it failed to retake the farm. There was heavy enemy shelling at intervals during the day, with numerous German aircraft over the battlefield signalling the British positions with flares. At midnight a platoon each from A and D Companies attacked Gravel Farm with help from additional Lewis guns which were used to stiffen C Company's fire (many of the rifles were choked with mud) and to act as a feint. By mistake the covering artillery barrage was fired an hour early, and the attack failed. Enemy observation aircraft were active again on 11 November and the shelling continued. That night the battalion was moved back to the support positions, with two companies of 9th West Ridings attached in case a counter-attack was required, but the support line was heavily shelled with gas. During 12 and 13 November the German aircraft were again active, calling down shellfire, dropping bombs and machine-gunning the narrow duckboard tracks which were the only routes across the mud. On 14 November the battalion was pulled out to Dragon Camp, where numerous case of Trench foot were reported as a consequence of the men having been standing for days in waterlogged trenches.

The offensive had ended. 12th (DLOY) Battalion resumed training at the camps behind the line, providing working parties for the artillery, and the battalion did one short spell in the support line. However, the camps were still under intermittent shellfire and air attack: on 29 November a lance-corporal on anti-aircraft duty shot down a German aircraft. On 28 November Lt-Col Truell returned to command the battalion. On 3 December 17 (N) Division moved further back to Louches, but was still at 12 hours' notice to move it required. Then on 15 December it entrained for Third Army, going first into camp near Achiet-le-Petit, then at Rocquigny. On 21 December it relieved 59th (2nd North Midland) Division in V Corps' line in the Flesquières Salient, where the Battle of Cambrai had recently ended. 12th (DLOY) Battalion was in the captured Hindenburg Line support trenches, where it spent time reversing the firesteps, moving the barbed wire to the side facing the enemy and providing working parties for 256th Tunnelling Company, RE, which was re-opening deep German dugouts.

=== Spring Offensive ===
It was recognised that the Flesquières Salient would be vulnerable when the Germans launched their anticipated Spring Offensive, so most of the salient was in the lightly defended 'Forward Zone' while the main defences of the 'Battle Zone' were drawn across its base. 17th (N) Division continued working on its defences and protective patrols were placed in No man's land every night. In fact the Germans had no intention of attacking this sector head-on; rather they would 'pinch out' the salient by attacking its 'shoulders'. For several days German artillery had shelled the salient with Mustard gas, but when the offensive began on 21 March the attacks against 17th (N) Division were restricted to heavy artillery fire and large raids, which were driven off. However, the German attacks further north had been successful and during the night 12th (DLOY) Bn was ordered to abandon the outposts and fall back on the defended village of Havrincourt. Before leaving, the CO and adjutant burned their HQ dugout with a tin of rum, and the battalion fell back as ordered. On 22 March the Germans launched a series of four attacks against the village from 18.35 to 20.30. The first attempt employed many grenades, but all the attacks were halted, the last when a field artillery brigade assisted the shooting of the defenders by laying a barrage on the attackers as they rose from the ground. German losses in this sector were heavy and they feared a counter-attack. The battalion's casualties during the day were 1 officer and about 30 ORs.

However, breakthroughs to the north and south made the situation at Flesquières precarious. That night 17th (N) Division fell back through its Battle Zone: 12th (DLOY) Bn was ordered back to 'Yorkshire Spoil Heap' in the old British front line north of Havrincourt Wood. Next day the division was withdrawn to the 'Red Line' as V Corps retired to avoid the German 'pincers'. 12th (DLOY) Battalion was ordered back to Rocquigny and together with the rest of 52nd Bde it got away cleanly, covered by B Company and the 10th Lancashire Fusiliers, but the rest of the division had some hard fighting. The battalion occupied an old German trench running across the Bus–Rocquigny road, but was able to return to camp that night before manning the trench at 04.00. On 24 March, supported by some tanks, 52nd Bde held onto its positions at Rocquigny until 15.00 when the troops on either flank had retired, after which it fell back rapidly under shrapnel fire and joined up with 63rd (Royal Naval) Division at Martinpuich, having lost touch with 17th (N) Divisional HQ. Next morning the 'Great Retreat' continued across the old Somme battlefields: at one point just before dawn 12th (DLOY) Bn, led by the brigade commander, was marching down the Martinpuich–Courcelette with German troops marching in parallel about 400 yards (370 m) away on either flank. Thinking that V Corps was fleeing the Germans attacked in masses without artillery support and were shot down. However, this attack did not develop on 12th (DLOY) Bn's front, and the battalion was able to spend a quiet night at Fricourt. Early in the morning it was ordered to Henencourt, where 17th (N) Division was assembling in corps reserve. After arriving there, the battalion was loaned to 9th (Scottish) Division and twice (that evening and the following morning) was sent up to deal with reported enemy breakthroughs, but each time its patrols found the 9th in position and untroubled, so the battalion returned to billets at Henencourt. Later on 27 March the frontline divisions were relieved by fresh Australian troops and V Corps' retreat ended. It established a defence line along the River Ancre. From 21 to 31 March 12th (DLOY) Bn had lost 17 ORs killed, 10 officers and 102 ORs wounded, and 108 ORs missing.

The battalion spent the next few weeks mainly in divisional reserve and training, occasionally being subjected to gas shelling. In April it received a draft of reinforcements, mainly from the 1/5th and 2/6th Manchesters from 66th (2nd East Lancashire) Division, which had been reduced to cadres. By June it was taking turns in the front line or supplying working parties to the front line battalions. Night raids were common along the line: on the night of 3/4 June B Company was shelled and a German raiding party approached but were driven off by artillery and machine gun fire responding to B Company's SOS flare.

=== Hundred Days Offensive ===
When the Allied Hundred Days Offensive was launched at the Battle of Amiens on 8 August, 17th (N) Division stood by in reserve behind the attacking Australian Corps but was not required. On 20 August it was transferred back to V Corps and was back in action from 23 August during the Second Battle of the Somme. On 24 August 52nd Brigade found that the brigade it was supporting had gone astray, and discovered the enemy still in place, so its attack on Courcelette had to be cancelled. Next day the brigade captured Martinpuich after 12th (DLOY) Bn encircled it from the south and 10th Bn Lancashire Fusiliers from the north. On 26 August the brigade was held up in front of High Wood until 12th (DLOY) Bn initiated another outflanking move from the south. The battalion's casualties over the two days were 5 officers and 47 ORs killed, 7 officers and 194 ORs wounded, one OR missing. Another attempt by the battalion at an outflanking move, against Le Transloy on 1 September, however, came to nothing when it was stopped by machine gun fire from the sugar factory, which another division had failed to capture. The village was heavily shelled overnight and 12th (DLOY) Bn, attacking at 05.00, worked round the flank across the Sailly-Saillisel road by 07.00, after which the Germans evacuated Le Transloy. The brigade then advanced behind a barrage to its second objective against little opposition, and continued on to Rocquigny by 22.00. The casualties had been a further 5 officers and 70 ORs, leaving only one fit officer per company.

The advance continued, with Third Army closing up to the Germans' Hindenburg Line defences. It then halted to organise a formal attack on the Hindenburg outposts, the Battle of Épehy on 18 September. 52nd Brigade led the attack for 17th (N) Division at 05.20: 12th (DLOY) and the other two battalions met considerable opposition from machine guns on the first objective, Chapel Hill, but had taken it by 05.50. The other brigades then passed through to complete the advance to the final objective. The battalion lost 4 officers and 114 ORs, but 31 ORs posted 'missing' later turned up. It received a large draft of reinforcements at the end of the month. After Third and Fourth Armies had broken through the Hindenburg Line, 17th (N) Division came back into the line on 9 October during the Second Battle of Cambrai. It advanced quickly without an artillery barrage, gaining 5.5 miles (8.9 km) in the day. Next day it found the enemy strongly posted behind the River Selle. On the night of 11/12 October the divisional engineers built footbridges over the river and next morning 52nd Bde attacked Neuvilly, with 12th (DLOY) Manchesters and 9th Duke of Wellington's Regiment passing either side of the village, leaving it to be mopped up by 10th Lancashire Fusiliers. 12th (DLOY) Battalion reached the railway beyond the village, but a counter-attack in the afternoon drove it back almost to the river. Nevertheless, the bridgehead was held. After 'one of the most strenuous days in the history of the Bn', 12th (DLOY) had lost 11 officers and 269 ORs, leaving it with four officers (including the CO, adjutant and medical officer) and a little over 300 men.

There was another pause until a full-dress attack (the Battle of the Selle) could be organised. 12th (DLOY) Battalion rested at Inchy, where a few reinforcements joined, but it came under consistent shelling, much of it with gas. On 20–21 October the rest of 17th (N) Division bypassed Neuvilly and completed the capture of the railway. After being reinforced with a mixture of old soldiers and raw recruits, 12th (DLOY) Bn advanced again on 31 October, fording the river and pushing onto the ridge beyond against German shelling and rearguards. The position was described as 'uncomfortable' because Neuvilly in the battalion's rear had still not been 'mopped up', and it was given two companies of the 7th Bn East Yorkshire Regiment as a flank guard. Meanwhile, the leading troops were shelled back off the ridge. 52nd Brigade attacked again on 4 November (the Battle of the Sambre): German shelling on the forming-up positions was heavy and their resistance in the orchards and hedgerows was obstinate, leading to considerable casualties. Nevertheless, the battalions reached their objectives and the follow-up brigades found their tasks easier. 12th (DLOY) Battalion's casualties were about 6 officers and 100 ORs, many suffering from the enemy's mustard gas. Next day other formations passed through the division and reached the River Sambre. 17th (N) Division took over the lead again on 8 November. The advance was now a pursuit, and 52nd Bde in the lead was unable to catch up with the retreating Germans. Hostilities ended at 11.00 on 11 November when the Armistice with Germany came into force, at which time 52nd Bde had reached the River Solre, south-east of Maubeuge.

After the Armistice, 17th (N) Division withdrew and was employed in salvage work, In December it moved back to the Abbeville area where it went into winter quarters. Demobilisation began in January 1919 and was completed in May, when the remaining cadres of the battalions returned home. 12th (DLOY) Battalion was disembodied on 20 May 1919.

The Commonwealth War Graves Commission lists 772 war dead for 12th Bn Manchester Regiment.
