= 96th Foot =

96th Foot may refer to:

- 96th Regiment of Foot, created from the 2nd battalion of the 52nd (Oxfordshire) Regiment of Foot in 1803 and renumbered 95th Foot in 1816, disbanded in 1818
- 96th Regiment of Foot, raised as the Minorca Regiment in 1798, given the name 97th (Queen's Own Germans) in 1805, and renumbered as the 96th in 1816

== See also ==
- List of Regiments of Foot, mid-18th century–1881
