= Wilfrith Elstob =

English recipient of the Victoria Cross

- Born: 8 September 1888; Chichester, Sussex
- Died: 21 March 1918 (aged 29); Saint-Quentin, France
- Military career
- Allegiance: United Kingdom
- Branch: British Army
- Service years: 1914–1918
- Rank: Lieutenant Colonel
- Commands: 16th Battalion, The Manchester Regiment
- Conflicts: First World War: German spring offensive †
- Awards: Victoria Cross; Distinguished Service Order; Military Cross; Mentioned in Despatches

Lieutenant Colonel Wilfrith Elstob VC, DSO, MC (8 September 1888 – 21 March 1918) was an English recipient of the Victoria Cross (VC), the highest and most prestigious award for gallantry in the face of the enemy that can be awarded to British and Commonwealth forces.

== Background ==
Elstob was born in Chichester in 1888, the son of the Rev. Canon J. G. Elstob and Frances Alice Elstob. His elder brother, Eric, would serve in the Royal Navy and play first-class cricket. He was educated at Christ's Hospital. Until war broke out and he volunteered, he was a schoolteacher. When Elstob was 29 years old, and a temporary lieutenant colonel commanding the 16th (Service) Battalion, Manchester Regiment, British Army during the First World War, he was awarded the VC for his actions on 21 March 1918 at the Manchester Redoubt, near Saint-Quentin, France on the first day of the German spring offensive. He was killed in action that same day.

=== Citation ===
For most conspicuous bravery, devotion to duty and self-sacrifice during operations at Manchester Redoubt, near St. Quentin, on the 21 March 1918. During the preliminary bombardment he encouraged his men in the posts in the Redoubt by frequent visits, and when repeated attacks developed controlled the defence at the points threatened, giving personal support with revolver, rifle and bombs. Single-handed he repulsed one bombing assault driving back the enemy and inflicting severe casualties. Later, when ammunition was required, he made several journeys under severe fire in order to replenish the supply. Throughout the day Lieutenant-Colonel Elstob, although twice wounded, showed the most fearless disregard of his own safety, and by his encouragement and noble example inspired his command to the fullest degree. The Manchester Redoubt was surrounded in the first wave of the enemy attack, but by means of the buried cable Lieutenant-Colonel Elstob was able to assure his Brigade Commander that "The Manchester Regiment will defend Manchester Hill to the last." Sometime after this post was overcome by vastly superior forces, and this very gallant officer was killed in the final assault, having maintained to the end the duty which he had impressed on his men – namely, "Here we fight, and here we die." He set throughout the highest example of valour, determination, endurance and fine soldierly bearing.

== The medal ==
His Victoria Cross is displayed at the Museum of the Manchester Regiment, at Ashton Town Hall, Ashton-under-Lyne, England.

== Commemoration ==
Elstob has no known grave. He is commemorated on the Pozières Memorial, in the Somme department of France, to the missing of the Fifth Army; and on the war memorials in Macclesfield & Congleton, Cheshire. There is a memorial to him in All Saints Church, Siddington, where his father was vicar. Elstobs name can also be seen listed on the Cenataph in Chichester, the city of his birth .

== Bibliography ==
- Monuments to Courage (David Harvey, 1999)
- Ashcroft, Michael (2007) [2006]. Victoria Cross Heroes. London: Headline Review. ISBN 978-0-7553-1633-5.
- Buzzell, Nora, ed. (1997). The Register of the Victoria Cross. Cheltenham, Gloucestershire: This England Alma House. ISBN 0-906324-27-0.
- Gliddon, Gerald (2013) [2004]. Spring Offensive 1918. VCs of the First World War. Stroud, Gloucestershire: The History Press. ISBN 978-0-7524-8730-4.
- Wilfrith Elstob, VC, DSO, MC: Manchester Regiment – "Here We Fight, Here We Die" (Robert Bonner, 1998)
