= Manchester Regiment =

- Cap badge of the Manchester Regiment during the First World War.
- Active: 1 July 1881 – 1 September 1958
- Country: United Kingdom
- Branch: British Army
- Type: Infantry
- Size: Line infantry
- Garrison/HQ: Ladysmith Barracks, Ashton-under-Lyne
- Anniversaries: Ladysmith, 23 February; Kohima, 15 May; Guadeloupe, 10 June; Inkerman, 5 November

Commanders
- Colonel-in-Chief: HM King George V (1930); HM Queen Elizabeth the Queen Mother (1947)
- Colonel of the Regiment: Edmund Richard Jeffreys (1881); John MacNeill Walter (1889) Sir Henry Radford Norman (1895); Vere Hunt Bowles (1899); William Osborne Barnard (1904); Sir Vere Bonamy Fane (1920); Sir Willoughby Garnons Gwatkin (1924); Hon. Sir Herbert Alexander Lawrence (1925); Wilfrid Keith Evans (1932); Francis Holland Dorling (1934); Charles Dawson Moorhead (1947); Eric Boyd Costin (1948); Thomas Bell Lindsay Churchill (1954)

The Manchester Regiment was a line infantry regiment of the British Army in existence from 1881 until 1958. The regiment was created during the 1881 Childers Reforms by the amalgamation of the 63rd (West Suffolk) Regiment of Foot and the 96th Regiment of Foot as the 1st and 2nd battalions; the 6th Royal Lancashire Militia became the 3rd (Reserve) and 4th (Extra Reserve) battalions and the Volunteer battalions became the 5th, 6th, 7th, 8th, 9th and 10th battalions.

After distinguished service in both the First and the Second World Wars, the Manchester Regiment was amalgamated with the King's Regiment (Liverpool) in 1958, to form the King's Regiment (Manchester and Liverpool), which was, in 2006, amalgamated with the King's Own Royal Border Regiment and the Queen's Lancashire Regiment to form the present Duke of Lancaster's Regiment (King's, Lancashire and Border).

== 1881–1899 ==
Between the 1860s and 1880s, the British Army underwent a period of reform implemented by Edward Cardwell and Hugh Childers. Single-battalion regiments were amalgamated and regiments were affiliated with a geographical area. The Manchester Regiment came into being on 1 July 1881 by the union of the 63rd (West Suffolk) and 96th Regiments of Foot. They had been linked in 1873 by their allocation to the 16th Sub-district Brigade Depot in Ashton-under-Lyne, near to Manchester. The 2nd Battalion, as the 96th Foot, had been raised in the town of Manchester in 1824. Eight additional battalions were gained through the incorporation of the 6th Royal Lancashire Militia and rifle corps units from Lancashire. By July, the regiment had the following under its command:

- Regimental Headquarters
- 63rd Regimental District (Regimental Depot) based in Ashton (later named Ladysmith Barracks)
- 1st Battalion (Regular)
- 2nd Battalion (Regular)
- 3rd (1st Battalion, 6th Royal Lancashire Militia) Battalion (Militia)
- 4th (2nd Battalion, 6th Royal Lancashire Militia) Battalion (Militia)
- 1st Volunteer Battalion — former 4th Lancashire Rifle Volunteers
- 2nd Volunteer Battalion — former 6th Lancashire (1st Manchester) Rifle Volunteers
- 3rd Volunteer Battalion — former 40th Lancashire (3rd Manchester) Rifle Volunteers
- 4th Volunteer Battalion — former 20th Lancashire (2nd Manchester) Rifle Volunteers
- 5th (Ardwick) Volunteer Battalion — former 23rd Lancashire Rifle Volunteers
- 6th Volunteer Battalion — former 7th Lancashire Rifle Volunteers

The 1st Battalion was deployed to Egypt to take part in the Anglo-Egyptian War in 1882 and was then deployed to Gibraltar in 1897. The 2nd Battalion was based in India from 1882 to 1897 and saw action on the North-West Frontier before departing for Aden.

== 1899–1914 ==
=== Second Boer War ===
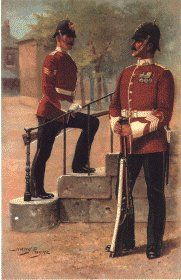
The Manchester Regiment in the full dress uniform of 1914. Illustration by Harry Payne (1858–1927)

Amidst growing tension between Boers and the British in the Transvaal, the 1st Manchester shipped to South Africa in September 1899. The battalion arrived in Durban, Natal Colony in early October, and was soon afterwards moved to Ladysmith. The war began on 11 October with a Boer invasion of the colony. After Boer forces captured Elandslaagte railway station, the Manchesters had four companies sent by armoured train to Modderspruit. While disembarking there, the Manchesters and accompanying Imperial Light Horse came under ineffectual artillery fire.

The 1st Manchesters, along with the Gordon Highlanders and the Imperial Light Horse, took part in the subsequent assault. The fighting was heavy, with the Boers pouring accurate fire into the advancing British troops. Under increasingly heavy fire, the battalion halted its advance. The Manchester became the main vanguard of the frontal assault, having originally been tasked with a left-flank attack on the Boer hills. Once the battalion closed in, the Boers withdrew to their main line of defence.

On 2 November, Boer forces encircled and isolated the town of Ladysmith, beginning a 118-day siege. On 6 January 1900, a contingent of 16 soldiers of the 1st Manchesters came under attack at Wagon Hill, near to Caeser's Camp. Against superior numbers, the detachment held its position for 15 hours. Only two survived, Privates Pitts and Scott, who had continued to hold out for many hours when the others had been killed. Both received the Victoria Cross for their actions, giving the regiment its first two VCs. By 28 February, Ladysmith had finally been relieved by a force under the command of General Redvers Buller.

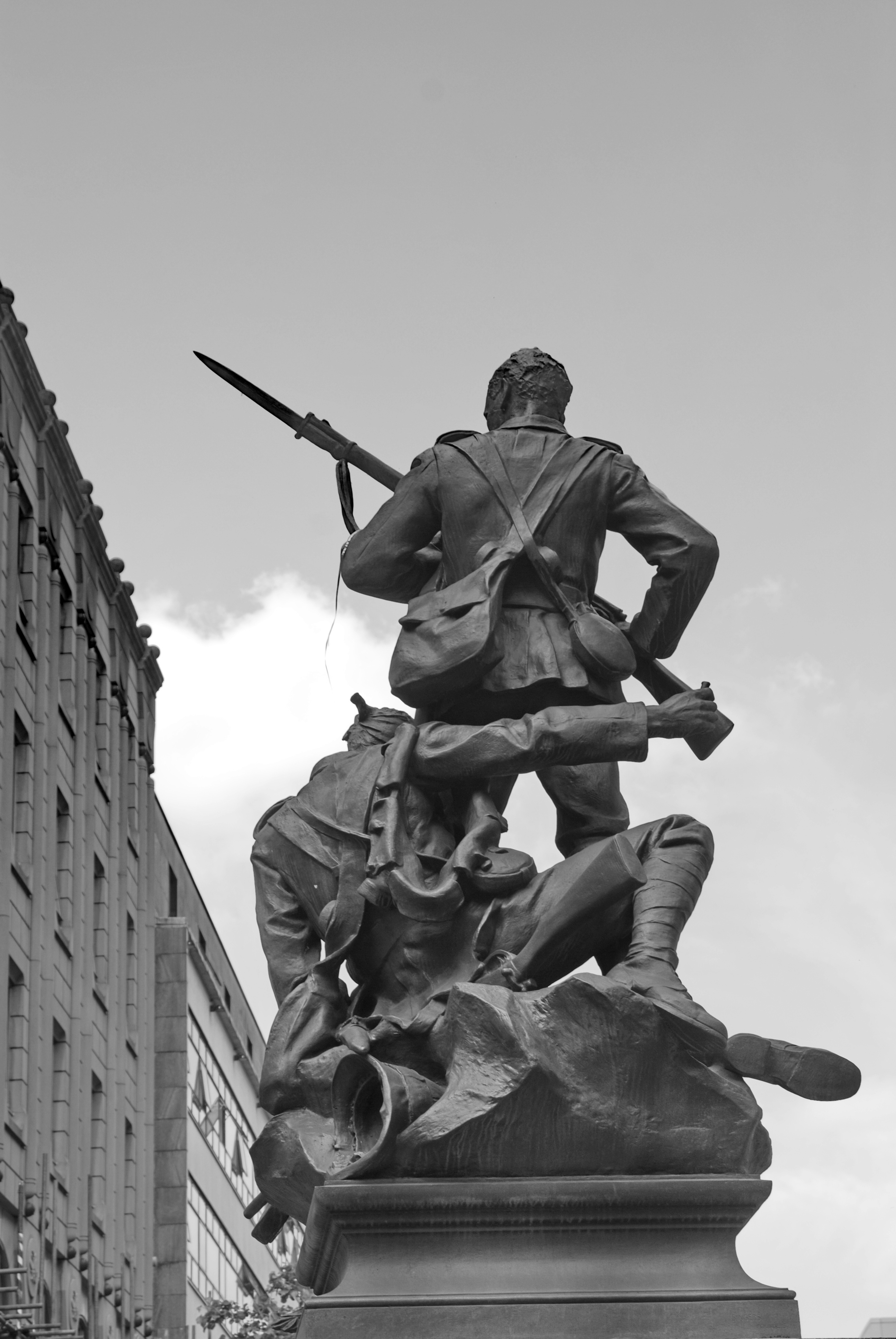
A regimental South African War Memorial (the work of William Hamo Thornycroft) in St Ann's Square, Manchester

The 2nd Manchesters was mobilized into a new 8th Division going to South Africa for the war. 930 officers and men of the regiment left Southampton in the SS Bavarian in March 1900, and in April arrived in Natal as reinforcements. Both battalions participated in the offensive that followed the relieving of Ladysmith, Kimberley and Mafeking. After the fall of Bloemfontein and Pretoria, the Boer commandos transitioned to guerrilla warfare. The 2nd Manchesters operated in the Orange Free State, searching farms and burning those suspected of housing commandos. The war ended with the signing of the Treaty of Vereeniging in May 1902. The 2nd battalion stayed in South Africa throughout the war. Four months later 340 officers and men of the battalion left Cape Town on the SS Michigan in late September 1902, arriving at Southampton in late October, when they were posted to Aldershot.

When the Boers proved more resilient than predicted, a number of regiments recruited in large centres of population formed additional regular battalions. The Manchester Regiment formed the 3rd and 4th Battalions in February 1900, at which time the militia battalions were relabelled as the 5th and 6th battalions. The 3rd Battalion was stationed in Saint Helena and South Africa from August 1902, while the 4th Battalion was stationed in Cork. In 1906, the 3rd and 4th battalions both returned to the United Kingdom, where they were disbanded.

The 5th (Militia) Battalion (until February 1900 known as the 3rd battalion) was embodied in May 1900, disembodied in October that year, and re-embodied in May 1901 for service in South Africa, for which it embarked the following month. More than 800 officers and men returned to Southampton in July 1902, following the end of the war.

The 6th (Militia) Battalion (until February 1900 known as the 4th battalion) was embodied in May 1900, disembodied in October that year, and later re-embodied for service in South Africa. More than 640 officers and men returned to Southampton by the SS Guelph in October 1902, following the end of the war, and was disbanded at the Ashton barracks.

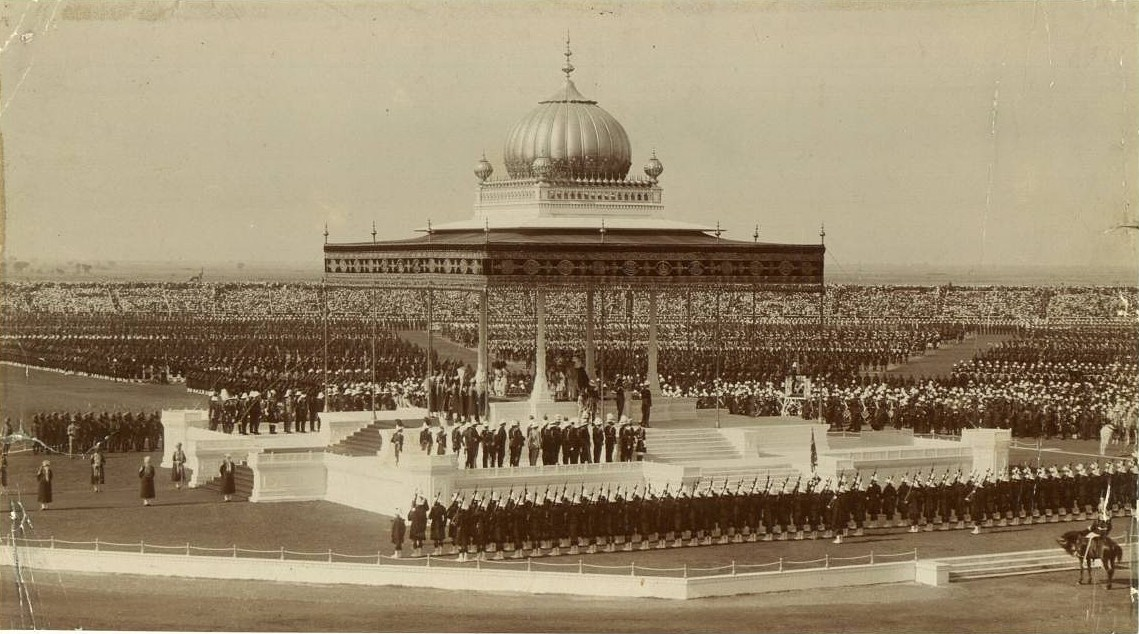
The 1911 Delhi Durbar

The 1st Manchesters left South Africa for Singapore in 1903. The following year, the 1st moved to India, where, in 1911, the battalion paraded at the Delhi Durbar, attended by King George V and Queen Mary. The 2nd Manchesters had returned to Britain in 1902, where it remained until the outbreak of the First World War in 1914.

=== Haldane reforms ===
In 1908, the Volunteers and Militia were reorganised nationally, with the former becoming the Territorial Force and the latter the Special Reserve. The regiment now had two Reserve and six Territorial battalions:

- 3rd (Reserve) Battalion (SR) at Ladysmith Barracks
- 4th (Extra Reserve) Battalion (SR) at Ladysmith Barracks
- 5th Battalion (TF) at Bank Street in Wigan (since demolished)
- 6th Battalion (TF) at Stretford Road in Hulme (since demolished)
- 7th Battalion (TF) at Burlington Street in Manchester
- 8th (Ardwick) Battalion (TF) at Ardwick Green in Manchester
- 9th Battalion (TF) at Old Street in Ashton-under-Lyne
- 10th Battalion (TF) at Rifle Street in Oldham

== First World War ==
=== Mobilisation ===
On the outbreak of war in August 1914 the 1st Battalion was part of the 8th (Jullundur) Brigade of the 3rd (Lahore) Indian Division, while the 2nd Battalion was part of 14th Brigade in 5th Division, stationed in Ireland.

In August 1914 the two Special Reserve battalions went to their war station in the Humber Garrison where they carried out the dual tasks of garrison duties and preparing reinforcement drafts of regular reservists, special reservists, recruits and returning wounded for the two regular battalions.

The Territorial battalions mobilised in August 1914 as part of the East Lancashire Division. Shortly afterwards the Territorial Force was invited to volunteer for overseas service and the bulk of the East Lancashire Division did so. The division was sent to Egypt to relieve the Regular garrison for service on the Western Front and was subsequently designated the 42nd (East Lancashire) Division. Those men who were ineligible for overseas service, together with the volunteers who were flooding in, were formed into second line units distinguished with a '2/' prefix (2/5th Manchesters etc) . The 2nd Line battalions of the Manchesters joined the 66th (2nd East Lancashire) Division.

Alfred Leete's recruitment poster for Kitchener's Army.

Meanwhile, on 6 August 1914, less than 48 hours after Britain's declaration of war, Parliament sanctioned an increase of 500,000 men for the Regular Army, and the newly appointed Secretary of State for War, Earl Kitchener of Khartoum issued his famous call to arms: 'Your King and Country Need You', urging the first 100,000 volunteers to come forward. This group of six divisions with supporting arms became known as Kitchener's First New Army, or 'K1'. Volunteers poured into the recruiting offices across the country and were formed into 'Service' battalions of the county regiments. So many came forward that the 'K1' battalions were quickly filled and the recruitment of the 'K2', 'K3' and 'K4' units quickly followed. The Manchesters formed the 11th (Service) Bn (K1), 12th (Service) Bn (K2), 13th (Service) Bn (K3) and 14th (Reserve) Bn (K4).

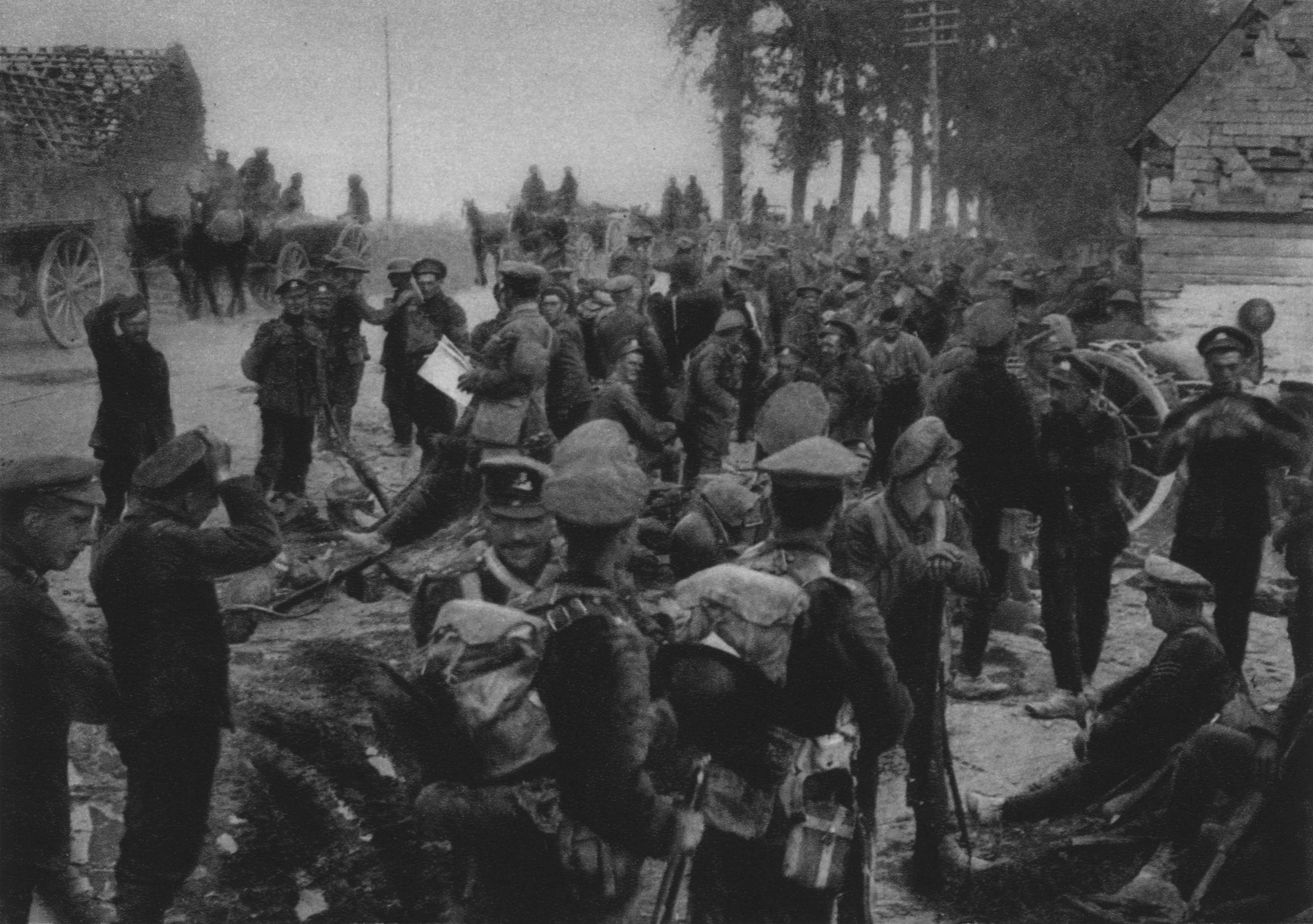
Tommies of the 2nd Battalion, Manchester Regiment, resting on their way to the front near Maison-Blanche, France, 9 August 1918.

The flood of volunteers overwhelmed the ability of the army to absorb and organise them, and by the time the Fifth New Army (K5) was authorised, many of its constituent units were being organised as "Pals battalions" under the auspices of mayors and corporations of towns up and down the country. The Lord Mayor and City of Manchester raised eight battalions of Manchester Pals, which became the 16th–23rd (Service) Bns of the Manchester Regiment, subtitled '1st City', '2nd City', etc. Meanwhile, the Mayor and Town of Oldham raised the 24th (Service) Bn (Oldham Pioneers). Later the 25th–27th (Reserve) Bns were formed from the depot companies of the Pals battalions.

=== Western Front ===
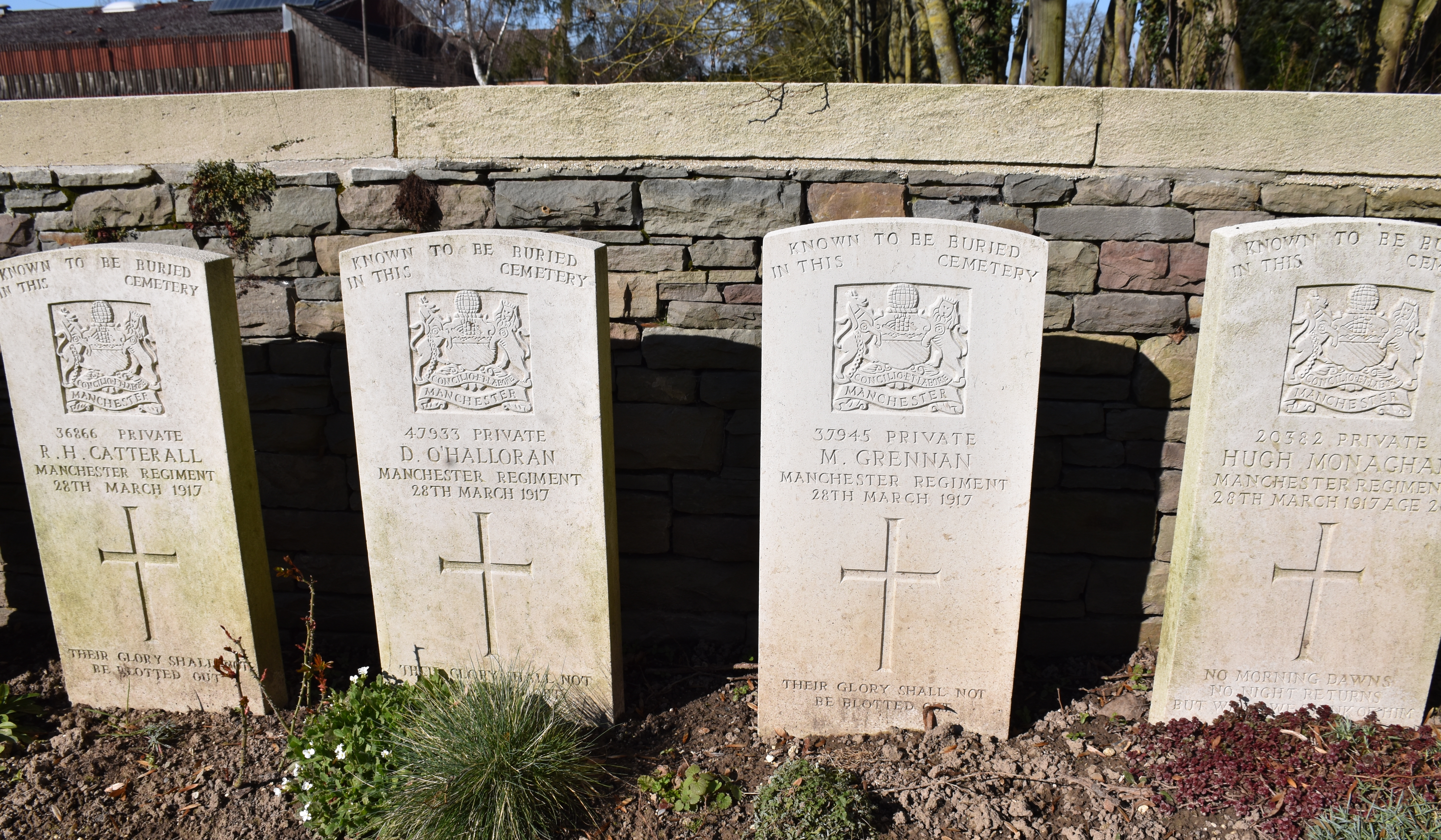
Graves of five soldiers in the cemetery of Ervillers.

The 1st Battalion moved to France, landing at Marseille in September 1914. Having been briefly attached to French cavalry, the 1st Battalion moved to the frontline on 26 October, relieving a battalion of the Bedfordshire Regiment near Festubert. Three days later, a heavy bombardment preceded an attack by a German force directed against the 2nd Battalion, Manchesters and the 1st Battalion, Devonshire Regiment. Despite capturing a trench line, the Germans were unable to capitalise due to the actions of a platoon commanded by Second-Lieutenant James Leach. In the process of their methodical retaking of the trench, the party killed eight, wounded two and captured 14 soldiers. For their contribution to the defence of the Manchesters' trenches, Second-Lieutenant Leach and Sergeant John Hogan were awarded the Victoria Cross. Severe casualties were sustained by the 1st Manchesters and its brigade during the Battle of Neuve Chapelle. A succession of intensely fought battles followed, culminating in the Second Battle of Ypres and Battle of Loos.

The 2nd Manchesters embarked for France with the 5th Division in August 1914 and contributed to the rearguard actions that supported the British Expeditionary Force's (BEF) retreat following the Battle of Mons. The battalion was engaged in the battles of the Marne, the Aisne and "First Ypres".

On 1 July 1916, the first day of the Battle of the Somme, the regiment had nine battalions committed, including the Manchester Pals, the 16th (1st City), 17th (2nd City), 18th (3rd City) and 19th (4th City), all serving in the 90th Brigade of the 30th Division. The day proved to be the deadliest in the British Army's history, with more than 57,000 killed, wounded or missing.

The regiment continued its involvement in the Somme Offensive. In late July, the 16th, 17th and 18th Manchesters attacked an area in the vicinity of the small village of Guillemont. During the action, Company Sergeant-Major George Evans, of the 18th, volunteered to deliver an important message, having witnessed five previous, fatal attempts to do so. He delivered his message, running more than half a mile despite being wounded. He was awarded the Victoria Cross.

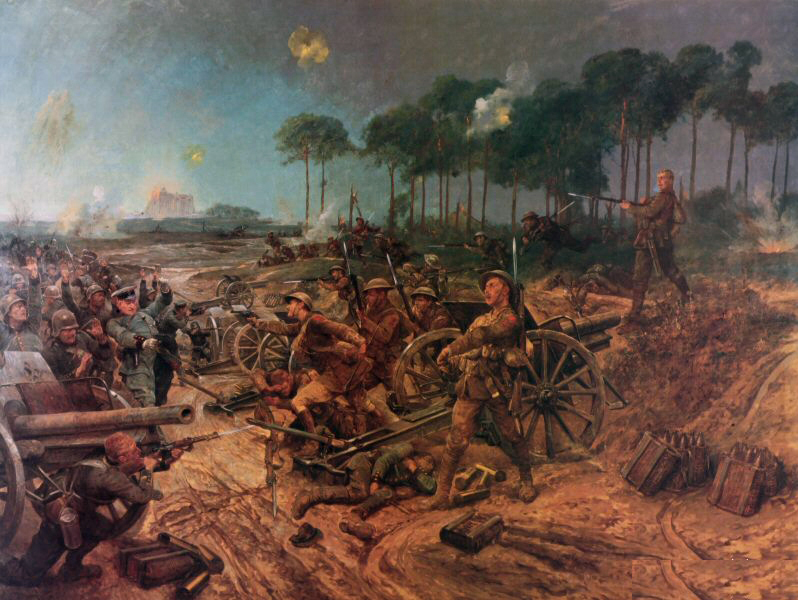
C Company, 2nd Manchesters taking the battery at Francilly Selency. Painting by Richard Caton Woodville (1856–1927)

On 2 April 1917, the 2nd Manchesters attacked Francilly-Selency, in which C Company captured a battery of 77 mm guns and a number of machine-guns. Two paintings were made of this action by the military artist Richard Caton Woodville. Later in the month, the Manchester Regiment fought in the Arras Offensive.

Preparations for a new offensive, the Third Battle of Ypres, in the Ypres sector had got under-way in June with a preliminary assault on Messines. The Manchester Pals' Brigade fought in the offensive's opening battle, at Pilckem Ridge, on 31 July. Conditions during "Third Ypres" (or Passchendaele) reduced the battleground to an intractable morass. During "Third Ypres", Sergeant Coverdale, of the 11th (Service) Battalion, killed three snipers, rushed two machine gun positions, then reorganised his platoon to capture another position, though after advancing some distance was forced back due to bombardment from the British artillery, suffering nine casualties in the advance.

After serving on the Western Front from July 1915 with 17th (Northern) Division, including the Ypres Salient and the battles of the Somme and Arras, 12th (Service) Battalion amalgamated with Regimental HQ and two squadrons of the Manchester-based Duke of Lancaster's Own Yeomanry (DLOY), who had been dismounted and retrained as infantry. From 24 September 1917 the battalion was redesignated 12th (DLOY) Battalion, Manchester Regiment. It continued serving with 17th (N) Division until the Armistice, including the Battle of Passchendaele, the German Spring Offensive and the Allied Hundred Days Offensive.

In March 1918, the German Army launched an all-out offensive in the Somme sector. Faced with the prospect of continued American reinforcement (who had entered the war in April 1917) of the Allied armies, the Germans urgently sought a decisive victory on the Western Front. On the morning of 21 March, the 16th Manchesters occupied positions in an area known as Manchester Hill, near to St. Quentin. A large German force attacked along the 16th's front, being repulsed in parts, but completely overwhelming the battalion elsewhere. Some positions lost were recaptured in counter-attacks by the 16th. Though encircled, the 16th continued to resist the assault, encouraged by its commanding officer, Lieutenant-Colonel Wilfrith Elstob. During the course of the battle, Elstob single-handedly repulsed a grenadier attack and made a number of journeys to replenish dwindling ammunition supplies. At one point, he sent a message to 42nd Brigade HQ that "The Manchester Regiment will defend Manchester Hill to the last", to his men he had told them "Here we fight, and here we die". The 16th Manchesters effectively ceased to exist as a coherent body. Lieutenant-Colonel Elstob was awarded a posthumous Victoria Cross. An attempt to retake the hill was later made by the 17th Manchesters, now part of 21st Brigade, with heavy losses. Two more Victoria Crosses were awarded to the regiment in the final months of the war. Also involved in the Spring Offensive were the 2/5th, 2/6th and 2/7th battalions, serving as part of 199th (2/1st Manchester) Brigade, part of 66th (2nd East Lancashire) Division, all battalions of the Territorial Force.

The later-prominent war poet, Wilfred Owen served with the 2nd Battalion, Manchesters in the later stages of the war. On 1 October 1918, Owen led units of it to storm a number of enemy strong points near the village of Joncourt. For his courage and leadership in the Joncourt action, he was awarded the Military Cross, an award he had always sought in order to justify himself. On 4 November 1918, Wilfred Owen was killed in action during the crossing of the Sambre–Oise Canal, exactly one week (almost to the hour) before the signing of the Armistice of 11 November 1918 and was promoted to the rank of Lieutenant the day after his death.

=== Middle East ===
In September 1914, just before the Ottoman Empire entered the war on Germany's side, six of the regiment's battalions joined the Egypt garrison. They belonged to the East Lancashire Division of the Territorial Force, which was selected to release Regular Army troops for service in active theatres. Serving in the division were the 5th, 6th, 7th, 8th, 9th and 10th battalions, with the latter two as part of the East Lancashire Brigade (which also included two battalions, the 4th and 5th, of the East Lancashire Regiment) and the other four the Manchester Brigade. In May 1915, the division was numbered as the 42nd (East Lancashire) Division and the brigades were numbered, the Manchester Brigade becoming 127th (1/1st Manchester) Brigade and the East Lancashire Brigade the 126th (1/1st East Lancashire) Brigade. In the same month, the division landed at Cape Helles, Gallipoli to reinforce the British beachheads established during the initial landings in April.

The Manchesters disembarked at "V" and "W", where, in the April landings, there had been at least 2,000 casualties. The Manchester battalions took part in the Third Battle of Krithia on 4 June 1915. The 127th Brigade reached their first objective and advanced a further 1,000 yards, capturing 217 Ottomans in the process.

During the Battle of Krithia Vineyard, the Manchesters suffered heavy losses and gained a Victoria Cross for gallantry by Lieutenant Forshaw of the 1/9th Battalion. The evacuation of Cape Helles lasted from December 1915 to January 1916. The Manchester battalions suffered many casualties during the Dardnalles Campaign. At the Helles Memorial, 1,215 names of the Manchesters alone fill the memorial.

The 1st Manchesters embarked for the Mesopotamian campaign, accompanying the infantry element of the Indian Corps, from France in late 1915. The battalion took part in the Battle of Dujaila in March 1916, which was intended to relieve the British forces in Kut-al-Amara, which was being besieged by Ottoman forces. In the battle, the 1st Manchesters seized the trenches of the Dujaila Redoubt with the 59th Scinde Rifles (Frontier Force); however, they were subsequently displaced by an Ottoman counter-attack, being forced back to their starting lines. During the withdrawal, Private Stringer held his ground single-handedly, securing the flank of his battalion. He was awarded the Victoria Cross. British and Indian forces suffered 4,000 casualties. After five failed attempts to relieve the town, Kut surrendered to Ottoman forces on 29 April 1916. The 1st Manchesters would take part in further actions in Mesopotamia, but in March 1918 the battalion moved to Egypt.

The battalion then moved to Ottoman-controlled Palestine, still part of the 3rd (Lahore) Division, to take part in the campaign there against the Ottomans. They fought in the last major offensive there, at Megiddo, on 19 September. Within three hours the Turkish lines, held by the Turkish Eighth Army, had been broken. Open warfare defined the theatre. During the Megiddo offensive, the cavalry advanced more than 70 miles in 36 hours. The 1st Manchesters took part in further engagements until the Armistice with the Ottoman Empire, remaining in the area until 1919.

=== Home Front ===
During a raid by German Zeppelin L 21 on the night of 31 March – 1 April 1916, 31 soldiers of the 3rd Manchesters were killed when a bomb hit their billet at Cleethorpes. (Note: Another account attributes the raid to Zeppelin LZ 64 and gives the casualties of the 3rd Manchesters as 29 killed and 53 wounded.)

As the war continued the Manchesters organised a number of other battalions for service away from the front lines. In 1915 the Home Service men of the TF battalions of the Manchesters and the Lancashire Fusiliers, were combined into 45th Provisional Battalion, which became 28th Manchesters on 1 January 1917. It served at home in 73rd Division and was disbanded in 1918. A 29th Battalion was formed in June 1918, but within days was absorbed into 16th (1st City) Bn. The 1st Garrison Battalion served in India, and the 2nd (Home Service) Garrison Bn at home. In addition, three training battalions were organised in 1917 for progressive training of recruits: 51st (Graduated), 52nd (Graduated) and 53rd (Young Soldier) Bns. One of the last surviving First World War veterans, Netherwood Hughes, served in the 51st Battalion. Ned Hughes died 4 April 2009 aged 108.

== Interwar years ==
In 1919, during the interwar period, the 1st Manchesters returned to Britain for a year, later reinforcing the garrison in Ireland. In 1922, it garrisoned the Channel Islands before joining the British Army of the Rhine in Germany. It returned to Britain in 1927 and, in 1933, departed for the West Indies. After being posted to Egypt in 1936, the 1st Manchesters was converted into a Vickers machine-gun battalion. The battalion had to be rushed to the Mandate of Palestine when the Arab populace erupted in revolt. In difficult conditions, the battalion suffered four killed and contributed a number of men to the counter-insurgency Special Night Squads. In 1937, a company on detachment in Cyprus provided a special guard for the Coronation parade. In 1938, the battalion moved to Singapore.

Meanwhile, in 1920, the 2nd Manchesters became part of the garrison in Mesopotamia, which had been acquired by Britain as a mandate territory under the auspices of the League of Nations. During an action near Hillah, Captain Henderson reorganised his company, who were wavering in the face of a large force of tribesmen, then led the company in three attacks against the tribesmen, being severely wounded in the second attack, though carrying on for the third and final counter-attack. He carried on fighting until he succumbed to a loss of blood and collapsed. Aided by one of his men, who helped him to stand, Henderson told his company, "I'm done now, don't let them beat you." He was shot again, which killed him. He was awarded the Victoria Cross for his actions. The battalion departed for India in 1922, where it remained until 1932. At the beginning of the Second World War, it was stationed in Britain.

The Territorial Force had been demobilised in 1919. It was reformed on 7 February 1920 and reorganised and renamed as the Territorial Army the following year. The battalions of the Manchester Regiment were reformed, the 5th, 6th, 7th and 8th continuing to serve in the 127th (Manchester) Infantry Brigade, and the 9th and 10th with 126th (East Lancashire) Infantry Brigade (alongside the 4th and 5th East Lancashire Regiment), both brigades still being part of 42nd (East Lancashire) Infantry Division. However, in 1921, the 6th and 7th battalions were amalgamated as the 6th/7th Battalion and later converted to become the 65th (The Manchester Regiment) Anti-Aircraft Brigade, Royal Artillery.

On 31 October 1938, during the period of rearmament preceding the Second World War, the 10th (Territorial Army) Battalion was converted to armour, becoming the 41st Battalion, Royal Tank Corps, later 41st (Oldham) Royal Tank Regiment. A 'second line' battalion, which was formed at Oldham in 1939, became the 47th (Oldham) Royal Tank Regiment.

== Second World War ==
=== North West Europe and Italy ===
When the German Army invaded France in May 1940, the 2nd, 5th and 1/9th Manchesters formed part of the British Expeditionary Force – the 2nd and 1/9th were Machine Gun battalions. The 2nd Battalion, a Regular Army unit, was the MG Battalion of the 2nd Infantry Division, the 5th was serving with 4th East Lancashire Regiment and 1st Highland Light Infantry in the 127th Infantry Brigade, 42nd (East Lancashire) Infantry Division and the 1/9th was with III Corps GHQ Troops. Despite putting up a stubborn defence, the BEF went into retreat, the Manchesters being engaged along the way. Much of the BEF converged on Dunkirk, where hundreds of ships evacuated more than 330,000 soldiers back to Britain. Of the surviving men of the 2nd Manchesters, more than 300 men were evacuated. Fewer than 200 remained, fighting until being either captured or killed.

In November 1941, the 5th Manchesters, along with the rest of the division (which became 42nd Armoured Division), was converted to armour as the 111th Regiment Royal Armoured Corps (Manchester Regiment), serving alongside the 107th Regiment Royal Armoured Corps (King's Own) and the 110th Regiment Royal Armoured Corps (Border) in the 11th Armoured Brigade. The men continued to wear their Manchester Regiment cap badge on the black beret of the RAC as did all infantry units converted in this way. However, 111 RAC was disbanded in November 1943 and 5th Manchesters reconstituted as an infantry battalion. In the summer of 1944, the battalion acted as the Royal Bodyguard at Balmoral Castle while the Royal Family was in residence and then served as a machine-gun battalion with 55th (West Lancashire) Infantry Division until the end of the war.

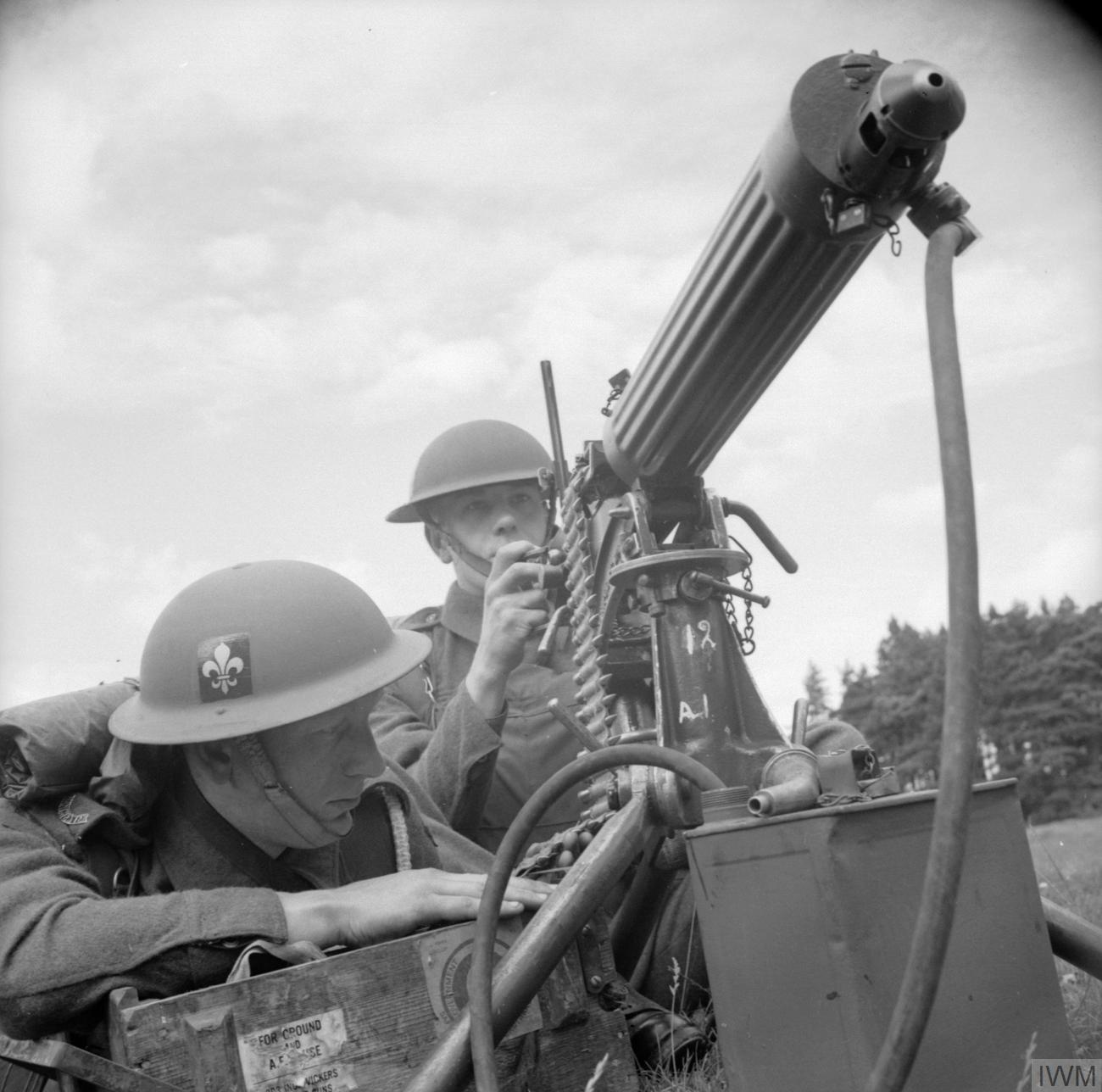
Men of the Manchester Regiment manning a Vickers machine gun, Southern Command, 16 August 1941.

In November 1941, the 2/9th Manchesters, a 2nd Line Territorial Army duplicate of the 1/9th and a Machine Gun Battalion, was transferred to the Royal Artillery and converted into the 88th Anti-Tank Regiment, Royal Artillery. (Sometime after this, the 1/9th Battalion was redesignated as the 9th Battalion.) The 88th Anti-Tank Regiment was part of the 49th (West Riding) Infantry Division until July 1943 when it transferred elsewhere and, in January 1944, the regiment was transferred to 45th (Holding) Division where it converted to the 88th Training Regiment, Royal Artillery.

The 6th Battalion, created on 31 July 1939 as a duplicate of the 5th Battalion, was serving as part of the 199th Infantry Brigade, initially part of the 66th Infantry Division, alongside the 7th Manchesters and the 2/8th Battalion of the Lancashire Fusiliers. On 23 June 1940, the 66th Division was disbanded and the 199th Brigade was transferred to the 55th (West Lancashire) Infantry Division. On 5 May 1942, the battalion was redesignated as the 1st Battalion, to replace the original battalion, which had been lost at Singapore in February. In October 1943, the new 1st Battalion transferred to the 53rd (Welsh) Infantry Division, where it was to remain for the rest of the war. On 27 June 1944, the 1st Battalion, Manchester Regiment landed in France, 21 days after the initial invasion had begun on 6 June, D-Day. With the rest of the 53rd Division, the battalion saw fierce fighting in the Battle of Normandy and took part in a number of engagements in the area around Caen, scene of much bitter fighting, which was captured by British and Canadian forces on 9 July, and later fought in the Battle of Falaise. The battalion advanced across Northern France, reaching Antwerp in Belgium in early September. The 1st Manchesters, along with the rest of the 53rd (Welsh) Division, moved to Turnhout, before advancing later that month into the Netherlands, where the 1st and 7th Manchesters saw heavy action, with the 7th, now as part of the 52nd (Lowland) Infantry Division, fighting in the Battle of the Scheldt under command of the First Canadian Army. The 1st Manchesters, after entering German territory in the face of the Wehrmacht's defences, crossed the Rhine with the 53rd Division in late March. The 7th Manchesters with 52nd Division saw its last fighting in Bremen, when that city was captured on 26 April. The 1st Battalion ended the war in Hamburg when that city surrendered on 3 May.

The 8th (Ardwick) Battalion had been serving alongside the 5th Manchesters in the 127th Brigade of the 42nd Division until 5 May 1940, when the battalion was transferred to Malta and was replaced in the brigade by the 1st Highland Light Infantry, a Regular Army unit. In August, the battalion became part of the Northern Infantry Brigade, later redesignated 2nd Malta Infantry Brigade and, finally, 232nd Infantry Brigade. In late July 1943, the 8th Manchesters was transferred to the 20th Indian Infantry Brigade, part of the 10th Indian Infantry Division, then serving in the Middle East. Both the 8th and 9th Manchesters took part in the Italian campaign. The 9th Battalion was part of the 4th Indian Infantry Division and later, from 15 July 1944 until 31 August 1945, formed the Support Battalion of the British 46th Infantry Division. The 9th Manchesters saw much action during the Battles for the Gothic Line in August–September 1944, including the Battle of Montegridolfo. After service in Greece during the civil war and a return to Italy for the last weeks of the campaign there, it reached Graz, Austria by the end of the war.

=== Far East ===
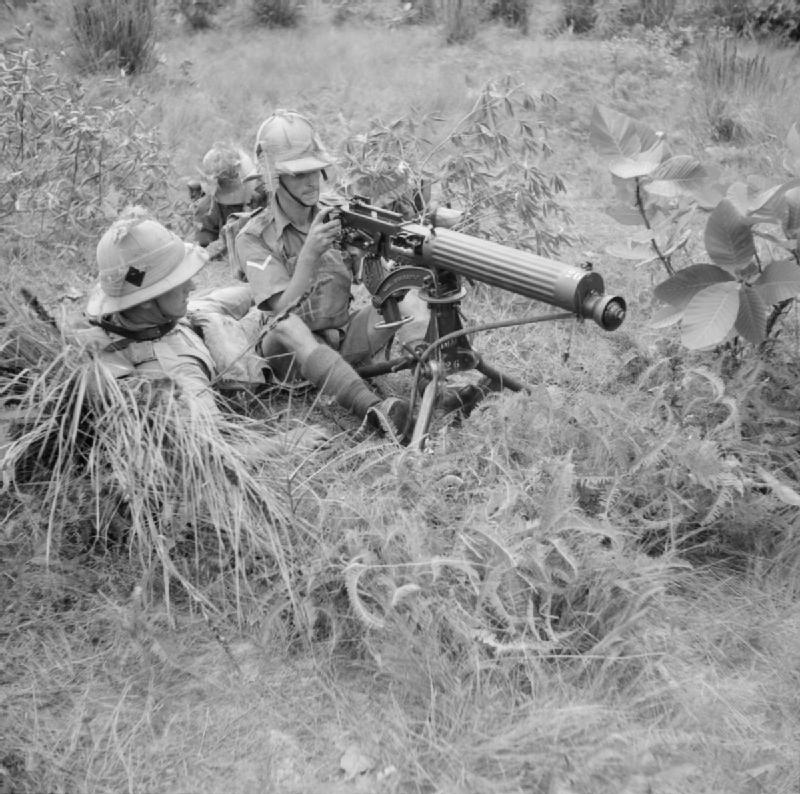
Vickers machine-gun of the 1st Battalion, Manchester Regiment, 17 October 1941, Malaya

Stationed in Singapore from 1938, the 1st Battalion, Manchesters, as part of the 2nd Malaya Infantry Brigade, saw action during the Japanese invasion of the island in February 1942. After a bitter defence, Lieutenant-General Arthur Percival signed the surrender of Singapore on 15 February. About 80,000 British and Commonwealth personnel became POWs of the Imperial Japanese Army. The 1st Battalion was reformed in the United Kingdom by the redesignation of the 6th Battalion.

In 1942, the 2nd Manchesters was sent to the sub-continent with the rest of the British 2nd Infantry Division, being stationed first in British India, then Burma in 1944. The battalion was involved in the Battle of Kohima in fierce fighting with the Japanese. It fought in subsequent actions in Burma until April 1945, when it returned to India.

== Postwar ==
The 1st Manchesters remained in Germany as part of the British Army of the Rhine (BAOR) until it returned to Britain in 1947, where it was joined by the 2nd Battalion. On 1 June 1948, the two battalions amalgamated in the presence of the regiment's colonel-in-chief, Queen Elizabeth. Soon afterwards, the 1st Battalion was posted to Germany, being first based at Wuppertal. On the regiment joining the West Berlin garrison in 1950, detachments performed guard duty at Spandau Prison. The battalion proceeded, in 1951, to Malaya aboard the troopship Empire Hallande. In three years of service during the Malayan Emergency, the Manchesters had 15 men killed in action.

With the exception of a brief return to Britain, the 1st Battalion, Manchesters remained part of BAOR until 1958. In the same year, the regiment was amalgamated with the King's Regiment (Liverpool) to create the King's Regiment.

== Heritage & ceremonial ==
=== Regimental museum ===
The Museum of the Manchester Regiment, which had previously been based at Ladysmith Barracks, moved to Ashton Town Hall in 1987. The museum remains closed while the town hall is being redeveloped.

=== Regimental collect ===
The regimental collect was:

O Lord our God whose name only is excellent and thy praise above heaven and earth we thank thee for the men of the Manchester Regiment who counted not their lives dear unto themselves but laid them down for their friends, beseeching thee to give them a part in those good things which thou has prepared for all whose names are written in the Book of Life. And grant to us that having them always in remembrance we may imitate their faithfulness and with them inherit, the new name which thou has promised to them that overcome; through Jesus Christ our Lord. Amen.

=== Battle honours ===
The battle honours of the regiment were as follows:

- From the 63rd Regiment of Foot: Egmont-op-Zee, Martinique 1809, Guadeloupe 1810, Alma, Inkerman, Sevastopol, Afghanistan 1879–80
- From the 96th Regiment of Foot: Egypt, Peninsula, New Zealand
- Guadeloupe 1759, Egypt 1882, Defence of Ladysmith, South Africa 1899–1902
- The Great War:
  - Western Front:Mons, Le Cateau, Retreat from Mons, Marne 1914, Aisne 1914, La Bassée 1914, Armentières 1914, Givenchy 1914, Neuve Chapelle, Ypres 1915 17 '18, Gravenstafel, St. Julien, Frezenberg, Bellewaarde, Aubers, Somme 1916 '18, Albert 1916 '18, Bazentin, Delville Wood, Guillemont, Flers-Courcelette, Thiepval, Le Transloy, Ancre Heights, Ancre 1916 '18, 1917 '18, Scarpe 1917, Bullecourt, Messines 1917, Pilckem, Langemarck 1917, Menin Road, Polygon Wood, Broodseinde, Poelcappelle, Passchendaele, St. Quentin, Bapaume 1918, Rosières, Lys, Kemmel, Amiens, Hindenburg Line, Épéhy, Canal du Nord, St. Quentin Canal, Beaurevoir, Cambrai 1918, Courtrai, Selle, Sambre, France and Flanders 1914–18
  - Italy: Piave, Vittorio Veneto, Italy 1917–18
  - Macedonia: Doiran 1917, Macedonia 1915–18
  - Gallipoli: Helles, Krithia, Suvla, Landing at Suvla, Scimitar Hill, Gallipoli 1915
  - Egypt and Palestine: Rumani, Egypt 1915–17, Megiddo, Sharon, Palestine 1918
  - Mesopotamia: Tigris 1916, Kut al Amara 1917, Baghdad, Mesopotamia 1916–18
- The Second World War:
  - North-west Europe: Dyle, Withdrawal to Escaut, Defence of Escaut, Defence of Arras, St. Omer-La Bassée, Ypres-Comines Canal, Caen, Esquay, Falaise, Nederrijn, Scheldt, Walcheren Causeway, Flushing, Lower Maas, Venlo Pocket, Roer, Ourthe, Rhineland, Reichswald, Goch, Weeze, Rhine, Ibbenburen, Dreirwalde, Aller, Bremen, North-West Europe 1940 '44–45
  - Italy: Gothic Line, Monte Gridolfo, Coriano, San Clemente, Gemmano Ridge, Montilgallo, Capture of Forli, Lamone Crossing, Defence of Lamone Bridgehead, Rimini Line, Montescudo, Cesena, Italy 1944
  - Mediterranean: Malta 1940
  - Far East: Singapore Island, Malaya 1941–42, North Arakan, Kohima, Pinwe, Shwebo, Myinmu Bridgehead, Irrawaddy, Burma 1944–45

=== Colonels-in-Chief ===
Colonels-in-Chief were:

- 1930–1936: King George V
- 1947–2002: Queen Elizabeth the Queen Mother LG LT CI ONZ GCVO GBE CC RRC CD

=== Regimental Colonels ===
Colonels of the regiment were:

- 1877–1881 (1st Battalion): Gen. Sir Richard Waddy (ex 63rd Foot)
- 1877–1881 (2nd Battalion): Gen. Thomas Maitland Wilson (ex 96th Foot)
- 1881–1889: Gen. Edmund Richard Jeffreys, CB
- 1889–1895: Gen. John McNeill Walter, CB
- 1895–1899: Lt-Gen. Sir Henry Radford Norman, KCB
- 1899–1904: Lt-Gen. Vere Hunt Bowles
- 1904–1920: Maj-Gen. William Osborne Barnard
- 1920–1924: Maj-Gen. Sir Vere Bonamy Fane, KCB, KCIE
- 1924–1925: Maj-Gen. Sir Willoughby Garnons Gwatkin, KCMG, CB
- 1925–1932: Gen. Hon. Sir Herbert Alexander Lawrence, GCB
- 1932–1935: Brig-Gen. Wilfrid Keith Evans, CMG, DSO
- 1934–1947: Col. Francis Holland Dorling, DSO
- 1947–1948: Maj-Gen. Charles Dawson Moorhead, CB, DSO, MC
- 1948–1954: Maj-Gen. Eric Boyd Costin, DSO
- 1954–1958: Maj-Gen. Thomas Bell Lindsay Churchill, CB, CBE, MC (to King's Regiment)
- 1958: Regiment merged with the King's Regiment (Liverpool) to form The King's Regiment (Manchester and Liverpool)

== Manchester Regiment Victoria Cross recipients ==
=== Second Boer War ===
- Private James Pitts VC MSM – (1st Battalion) in Natal on 6 January 1900.
- Private Robert Scott VC – (1st Battalion) in Natal on 6 January 1900.

=== First World War ===
- Sergeant John Hogan VC – (2nd Battalion) at Festubert, France, on 29 October 1914.
- Second lieutenant James Leach VC – (2nd Battalion) at Festubert France in the First World War on 29 October 1914.
- Corporal Issy Smith VC – (1st Battalion) at the Second Battle of Ypres on 26 April 1915.
- Lieutenant William Forshaw VC – (1/9th Battalion Territorial Force) at the Battle of Krithia Vineyard in Gallipoli between 7 and 9 August 1915.
- Private George Stringer VC at the Battle of Es Sinn in Mesopotamia on 8 March 1916.
- CSM George Evans VC – (18th Battalion 3rd Manchester Pals) during the Battle of the Somme at Guillemont France on 30 July 1916.
- Sergeant Charles Harry Coverdale VC MM – (11th Battalion) at Poelcapelle Belgium on 4 October 1917.
- Private Walter Mills VC – (C Company 1/10th Battalion) at Red Dragon Crater near Givenchy France on 11 December 1917.
- Lieutenant Colonel Wilfrith Elstob VC DSO MC – (16th Battalion) at the Manchester Redoubt, near St. Quentin France on 21 March 1918.
- Private Alfred Robert Wilkinson VC – (1/5th Battalion Territorial Force) at the Battle of the Selle, near the Selle River France on 20 October 1918.
- Private James Kirk VC – (10th Battalion) at the Battle of the Sambre at the River Sambre France on 4 November 1918.

=== 1920 Iraqi Revolt ===
- captain George Stuart Henderson VC DSO* MC – (2nd Battalion) during the 1920 Iraqi Revolt near Hillah Mesopotamia on 24 July 1920.

== Notes ==
Preceded by 63rd Regiment of Foot; 96th Regiment of Foot	Manchester Regiment; 1881–1958	Succeeded by King's Regiment
