= Charles Harry Coverdale =

English recipient of the Victoria Cross

- Born: 21 April 1888; Old Trafford, Greater Manchester, England
- Died: 20 November 1955 (aged 67); Huddersfield, Yorkshire
- Burial place: Edgerton Cemetery, Huddersfield
- Military career
- Allegiance: United Kingdom
- Branch: British Army
- Rank: Second Lieutenant
- Units: Manchester Regiment
- Conflicts: World War I; Battle of Broodseinde
- Awards: Victoria Cross; Military Medal

Charles Harry Coverdale VC MM (21 April 1888 – 20 November 1955) was an English recipient of the Victoria Cross, the highest and most prestigious award for gallantry in the face of the enemy that can be awarded to British and Commonwealth forces.

Coverdale was 29 years old, and a sergeant in the 11th Battalion, The Manchester Regiment, British Army during the First World War when the following deed took place for which he was awarded the VC.

On 4 October 1917 south-west of Poelcapelle, Belgium, when close to the objective, Sergeant Coverdale disposed of three snipers. He then rushed two machine-guns, killing or wounding the teams. He subsequently reorganised his platoon in order to capture another position, but after getting within 100 yards of it was held up by our own barrage and had to return. Later he went out again with five men to capture the position, but when he saw a considerable number of the enemy advancing, withdrew his detachment man by man, he himself being the last to retire.

He later achieved the rank of second lieutenant with the Manchester Regiment.

== Bibliography ==
- Snelling, Stephen (2012) [1998]. Passchendaele 1917. VCs of the First World War. The History Press. ISBN 978-0752476667.
- Whitworth, Alan (2012). Yorkshire VCs. Pen and Sword Books. ISBN 978-1-84884-778-1.
