= Rifle Street drill hall, Oldham =

Former military installation in England

Old Drill Hall
- Oldham
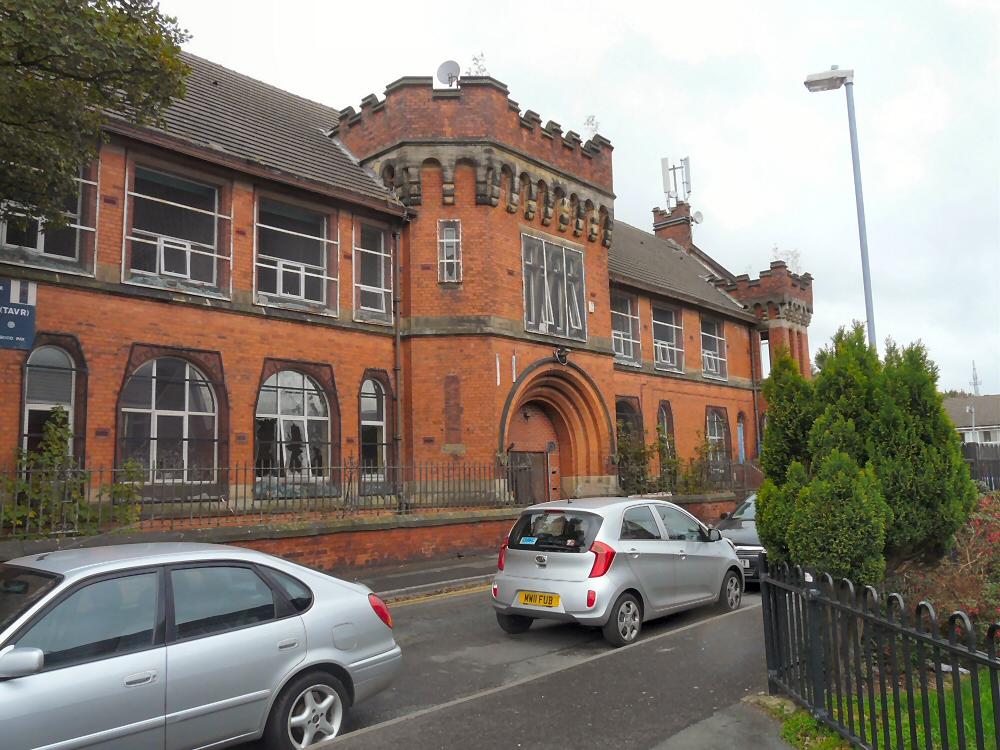
- Rifle Street drill hall

Site information
- Type: Drill hall

Location
- Location within Greater Manchester
- Coordinates: 53.54649°N 2.11338°W

Site history
- Built: 1897
- Built for: War Office
- In use: 1897-1990s

The Rifle Street drill hall, also known as the Old Drill Hall, is a former military installation in the Coldhurst area of Oldham, in Greater Manchester, England.

== History ==
The building was designed as the headquarters of the 6th Volunteer Battalion, The Manchester Regiment and completed in 1897. This unit evolved to become the 10th Battalion, The Manchester Regiment in 1908. The battalion was mobilised at the drill hall in August 1914 before being deployed to Gallipoli and, ultimately, to the Western Front. The battalion converted to form the 41st (Oldham) Battalion, Royal Tank Regiment just before the Second World War and evolved to become the 40th/41st Royal Tank Regiment in 1956. After the cut-backs in 1967, the presence at the drill hall was reduced to a single squadron, A Squadron, The Duke of Lancaster's Own Yeomanry (Royal Tank Regiment). After the squadron moved out of the drill hall in the mid-1990s, it continued to be used for industrial purposes until it was badly damaged in serious fires in April 2011 and June 2025.
