= Old Street drill hall, Ashton-under-Lyne =

Military building in Ashton-under-Lyne, England

Old Street drill hall
- Ashton-under-Lyne
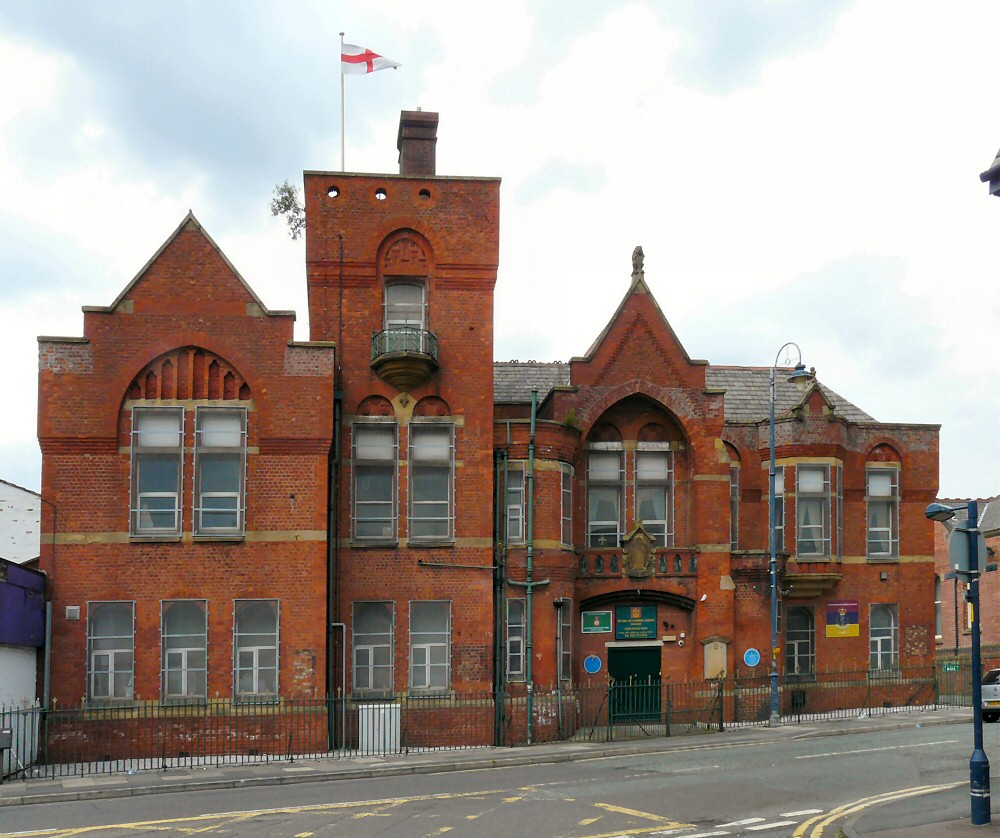
- Old Street drill hall

Site information
- Type: Drill hall

Location
- Location within Greater Manchester
- Coordinates: 53.48673°N 2.09845°W

Site history
- Built: 1887
- Built for: War Office
- In use: 1887-present

The Old Street drill hall is a former military installation in Ashton-under-Lyne, Greater Manchester, England, known locally as "The Armoury".

== History ==
The building was designed as the headquarters of the 7th Lancashire Rifle Volunteer Corps and completed in 1887. This unit evolved to become the 3rd Volunteer Battalion, The Manchester Regiment in 1888 and the 9th Battalion, The Manchester Regiment in 1908. The battalion was mobilised at the drill hall in August 1914 before being deployed to Gallipoli and, ultimately, to the Western Front. Follow the cut-backs in 1967, the presence at the drill hall was reduced to a single company, C (Manchester) Company, 2nd Battalion, Lancastrian Volunteers in 1971; this unit evolved to become C Company, 4th (Volunteer) Battalion, The Queen's Lancashire Regiment in 1975 and C Company, 5th Battalion, The Royal Regiment of Fusiliers in 1986. The Ministry of Defence made the decision to dispose of the building in 2013; this decision was later reversed, and the building continues to be used by the cadet forces.
