= George Stuart Henderson =

Recipient of the Victoria Cross

- Born: 5 December 1893; East Gordon, Berwickshire
- Died: 24 July 1920 (aged 26); Hillah, Mesopotamia
- Military career
- Allegiance: United Kingdom
- Branch: British Army
- Service years: 1914–1920
- Rank: Captain
- Units: The Manchester Regiment
- Conflicts: First World War; 1920 Iraqi Revolt †
- Awards: Victoria Cross; Distinguished Service Order & Bar; Military Cross; Mentioned in Despatches (5)

George Stuart Henderson VC, DSO & Bar, MC (5 December 1893 – 24 July 1920) was a British Army officer and a Scottish recipient of the Victoria Cross, the highest award for gallantry in the face of the enemy that can be awarded to British and Commonwealth forces.

== Early life ==
Henderson was born in East Gordon, Berwickshire, on 5 December 1893 to Robert and Mary Henderson.

== Details ==
Henderson was 26 years old, and a captain in the 2nd Battalion, The Manchester Regiment during the 1920 Iraqi Revolt, then called Mesopotamia, when the following deed took place on 24 July 1920 near Hillah, Mesopotamia for which he was awarded the VC.

The late Captain George Stuart Henderson, D.S.O., M.C:, 2nd Bn., Manchester Regt. For most conspicuous bravery and self sacrifice.

On the evening of the 24th July, 1920, when about fifteen miles from Hillah (Mesopotamia), the Company under his command was ordered to retire. After proceeding about 500 yards a large party of Arabs suddenly opened fire from the flank, causing the Company to split up and waver. Regardless of all danger, Capt. Henderson at once reorganised the Company, led them gallantly to the attack and drove off the enemy.

On two further occasions this officer led his men to charge the Arabs with the bayonet and forced them to retire. At one time, when the situation was extremely critical and the troops and transport were getting out of hand, Capt. Henderson, by sheer pluck and coolness, steadied his command, prevented the Company from being cut up, and saved the situation.

During the second charge he fell wounded, but refused to leave his command, and just as the Company reached the trench they were making for he was again wounded. Realising that he could do no more, he asked one of his N.C.O.'s to hold him up on the embankment, saying, "I'm done now, don't let them beat you." He died fighting.

He is commemorated on Jedburgh War Memorial and the Basra Memorial.

== The medal ==
His Victoria Cross is displayed at the Museum of the Manchester Regiment in Ashton-under-Lyne, England.
