= George Stringer =

English recipient of the Victoria Cross

- Born: 24 January 1889; Miles Platting, Manchester
- Died: 10 November 1957 (aged 68); Oldham, Lancashire
- Burial place: Philips Park Cemetery, Manchester; 53°29′20.5″N 2°11′59″W
- Military career
- Allegiance: United Kingdom
- Branch: British Army
- Service years: 1905–1917
- Rank: Private
- Units: Manchester Regiment
- Conflicts: World War I
- Awards: Victoria Cross; Mentioned in Despatches; Gold Medal for Bravery (Serbia)

George Stringer VC (24 July 1889 – 22 November 1957) from Miles Platting, Manchester was an English recipient of the Victoria Cross, the highest and most prestigious award for gallantry in the face of the enemy that can be awarded to British and Commonwealth forces.

== Early life ==
Upon leaving school, Stringer worked for a local cloth dyer and bleacher. In 1905, he joined the Lancashire Fusilier Volunteers, a militia unit, and just before the outbreak of World War I he joined a territorial unit of the Manchester Regiment, then went on active duty with the 1st Battalion.

== Military career ==
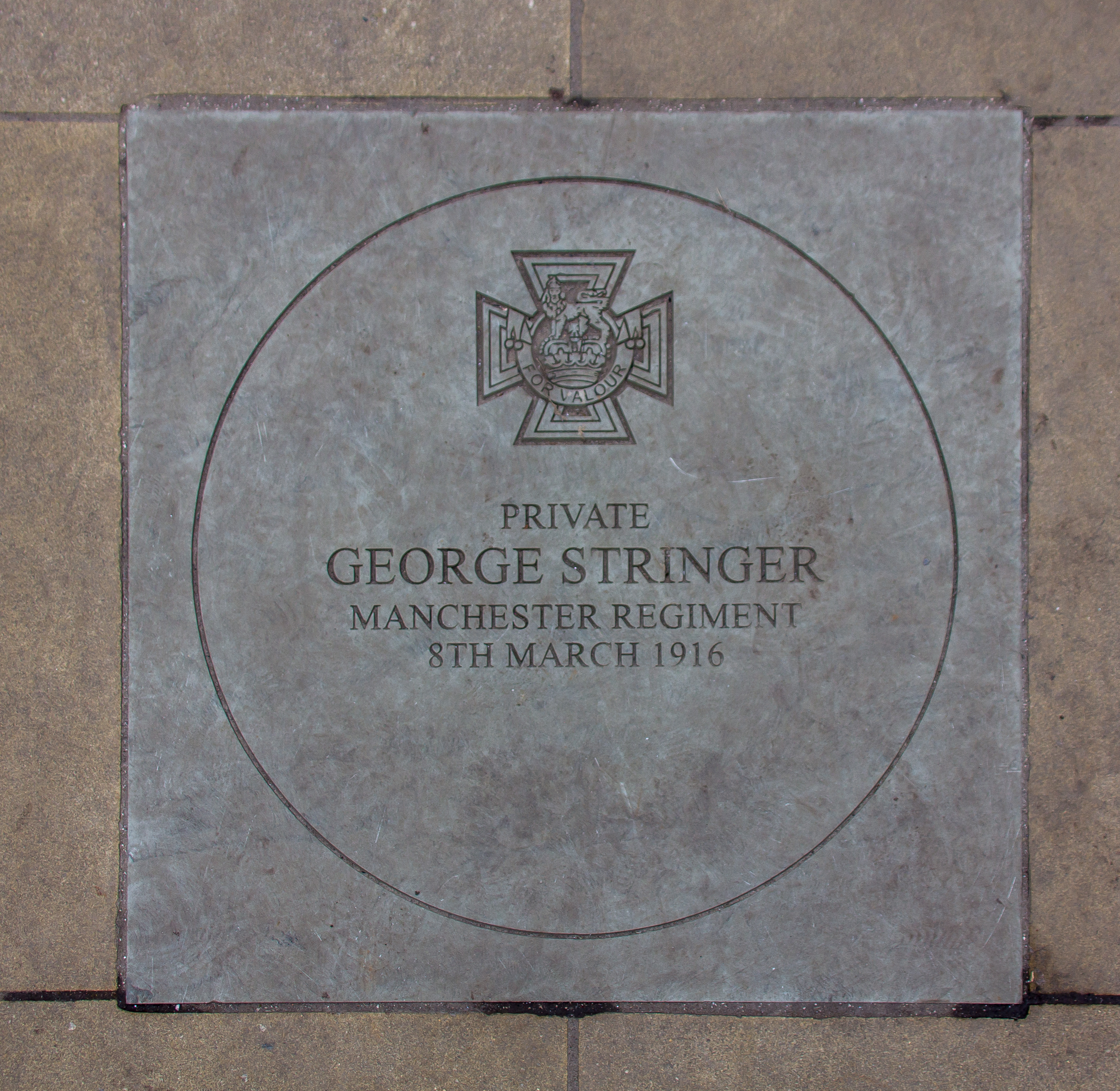
Plaque at the Manchester Cenotaph

His unit fought in France until December 1915, before being posted to Mesopotamia in January 1916. On 8 March 1916, Stringer took part with the 1st Battalion, Manchester Regiment in the Battle of Dujaila, an unsuccessful British attempt to relieve the besieged garrison at Kut-al-Amara. During the fighting at the Dujaila Redoubt, he held the battalion's exposed right flank during an Ottoman counter-attack, allowing the battalion to withdraw in good order. For this action he was awarded the Victoria Cross.

His citation in the London Gazette read:

For most conspicuous bravery and determination. After the capture of an enemy position, he was posted on the extreme right of the Battalion in order to guard against any hostile attack. His battalion was subsequently forced back by an enemy counter-attack, but Private Stringer held his ground single-handed and kept back the enemy till all his hand-grenades were expended. His very gallant stand saved the flank of his battalion and rendered a steady withdrawal possible.

Stringer was subsequently Mentioned in Despatches and also awarded the Gold Medal for Bravery by the Kingdom of Serbia. He was later wounded, developed enteric fever and jaundice, and was returned to the UK in June 1917.

As a result of his wounds, Stringer was given a disability pension and a job as a doorkeeper with the Manchester Assistance Board which he kept until he retired aged 62, with time out during World War II for a stint as a munitions worker. He died six years later in the town of Oldham and was buried in Philips Park Cemetery, close to William Jones VC.

Stringer's medals are in the collection of the Museum of The Manchester Regiment, Ashton-under-Lyne, Greater Manchester.

== See also ==
- Mesopotamian campaign
- Battle of Ctesiphon

== Bibliography ==
- Gliddon, Gerald (2005). The Sideshows. VCs of the First World War. Gloucestershire, England: Sutton Publishing. ISBN 978-0-7509-2084-1.
