= James Leach (VC) =

- Born: 27 July 1892; North Shields, Northumberland
- Died: 15 August 1958 (aged 66); Shepherd's Bush, London
- Burial place: Mortlake Crematorium
- Military career
- Allegiance: United Kingdom
- Branch: British Army
- Rank: Captain
- Units: The Manchester Regiment
- Conflicts: First World War; Anglo-Irish War
- Awards: Victoria Cross
- Other work: Police officer

James Edgar Leach VC (27 July 1892 – 15 August 1958) was a British Army officer and English recipient of the Victoria Cross, the highest and most prestigious award for gallantry in the face of the enemy that can be awarded to British and Commonwealth forces.

Leach was 22 years old, and a Second Lieutenant in the 2nd Battalion, The Manchester Regiment, in France during the First World War. The 2nd Manchesters formed part of 5 Division, which had crossed the Béthune–La Bassée canal and then came under heavy attack. On 29 October 1914, near Festubert, the following deed took place for which Leach and Sergeant John Hogan were awarded the VC.

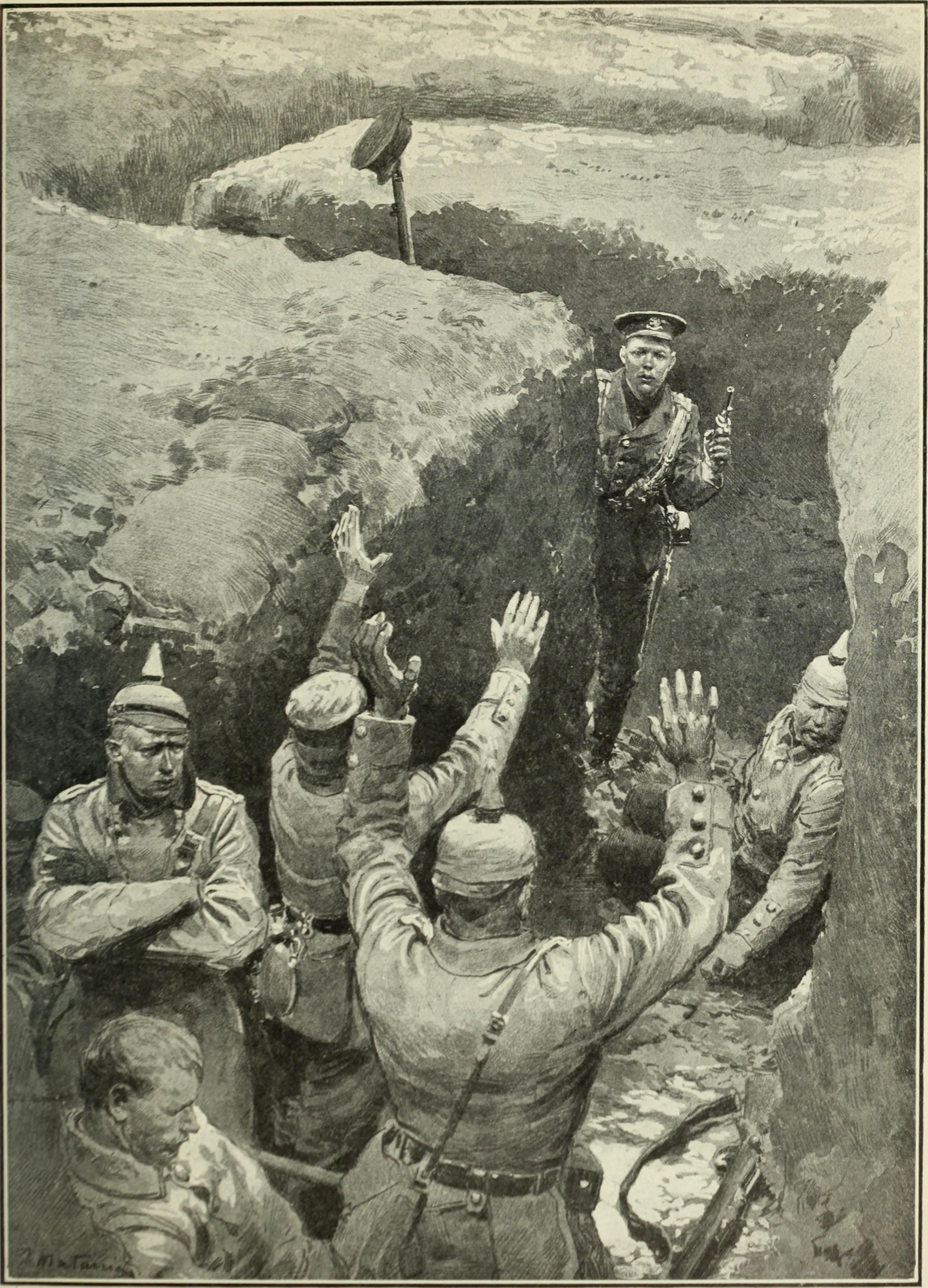
SECOND-LIEUTENANT JAMES LEACH AND SERGEANT JOHN HOGAN (The Times History of The War, Volume X)

Their citation reads:

For conspicuous bravery near Festubert on 29 October, when, after their trench had been taken by the Germans, and after two attempts at recapture had failed, they voluntarily decided on the afternoon of the same day to recover the trench themselves, and, working from traverse to traverse at close quarters with great bravery, they gradually succeeded in regaining possession, killing eight of the enemy, wounding two, and making sixteen prisoners.

Leach later achieved the rank of Captain. After the war, he served in the Auxiliary Division of the Royal Irish Constabulary. His VC is on display in the Lord Ashcroft Gallery at the Imperial War Museum, London.

== Bibliography ==
- Gliddon, Gerald (2011) [1994]. 1914. VCs of the First World War. The History Press. ISBN 978-0752459080.
