= John Hogan (VC) =

English Victoria Cross recipient (1884–1943)

- Born: 8 April 1884; Royton, Lancashire
- Died: 7 October 1943 (aged 59); Oldham, Lancashire, England
- Burial place: Chadderton Cemetery, Greater Manchester, England
- Military career
- Allegiance: United Kingdom
- Branch: British Army
- Rank: Sergeant
- Units: The Manchester Regiment
- Conflicts: World War I
- Awards: Victoria Cross

John Hogan VC (8 April 1884 – 6 October 1943) was an English recipient of the Victoria Cross, the highest and most prestigious award for gallantry in the face of the enemy that can be awarded to British and Commonwealth forces.

Hogan was born in Royton, Lancashire, England.

On 2 January 1915 Hogan married a widow, Margaret Taylor, at St Mary's Roman Catholic Church, Shaw Street, Oldham.

Hogan was 30 years old, and a sergeant in the 2nd Battalion, The Manchester Regiment, British Army, during the First World War. On 29 October 1914 near Festubert, France, he performed a deed along with Second Lieutenant James Leach for which he was awarded the Victoria Cross.

Their citation reads:

For conspicuous bravery near Festubert on 29 October, when, after their trench had been taken by the Germans, and after two attempts at recapture had failed, they voluntarily decided on the afternoon of the same day to recover the trench themselves, and, working from traverse to traverse at close quarters with great bravery, they gradually succeeded in regaining possession, killing eight of the enemy, wounding two, and making sixteen prisoners.

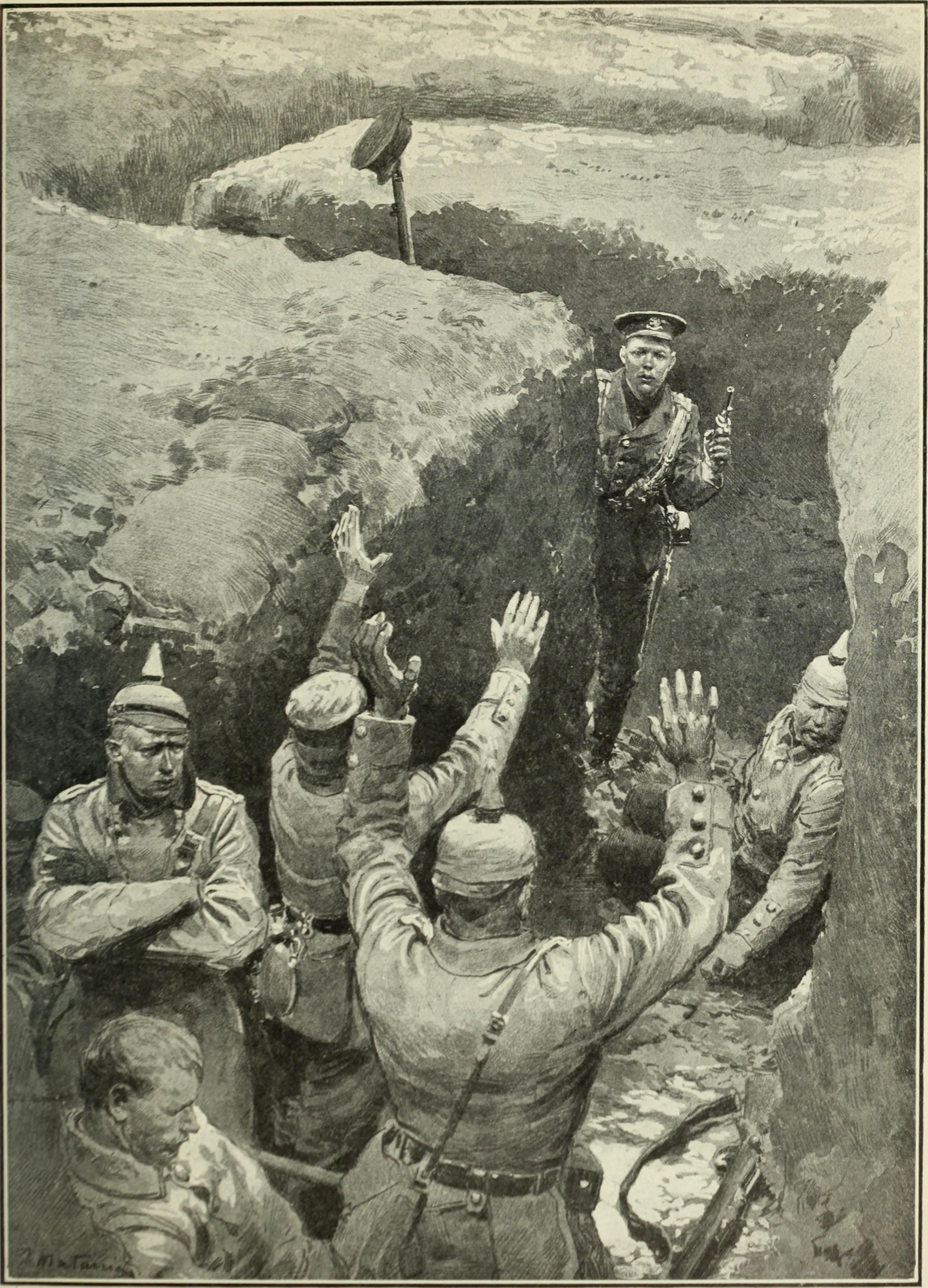
SECOND-LIEUTENANT JAMES LEACH AND SERGEANT JOHN HOGAN (The Times History of The War, Volume X)

== Medal ==
He received the medal in 1914 from King George V, at a ceremony in Buckingham Palace. His medal is in Oldham Civic Centre, Oldham, Greater Manchester.

== Bibliography ==
- Gliddon, Gerald (2011) [1994]. 1914. VCs of the First World War. The History Press. ISBN 978-0752459080.
