= Ashton Town Hall =

Municipal building in Ashton, Greater Manchester, England

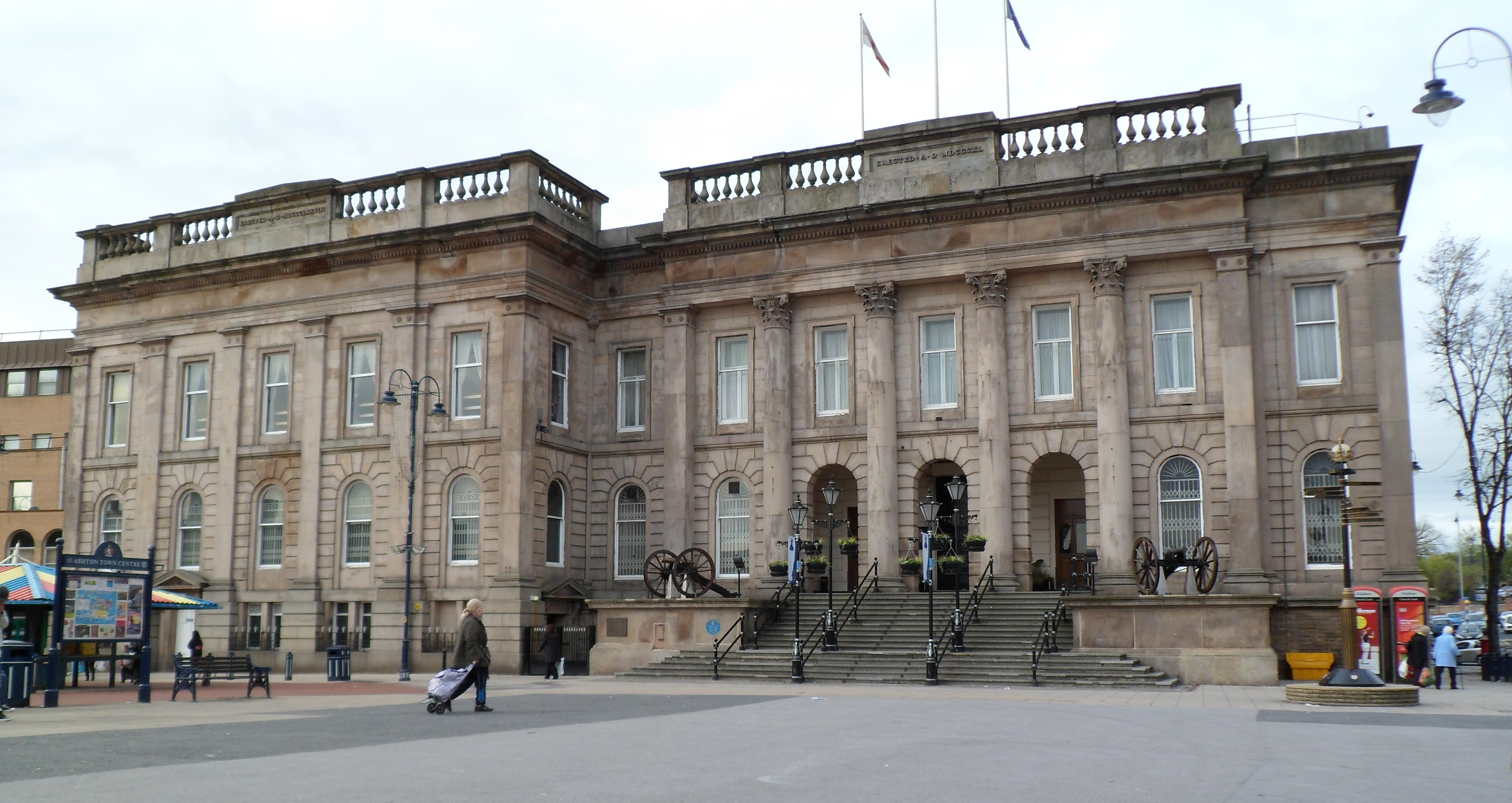
- Ashton Town Hall

- Shown in Greater Manchester
- 53.4898°N 2.0935°W
- Location: Ashton-under-Lyne, Greater Manchester, England

History
- Built: 1840

Site notes
- Architect(s): William Young and Charles Lee
- Architectural style: Neoclassical style
- Website: www.tameside.gov.uk/museumsgalleries/mom/

Listed Building – Grade II
- Official name: Ashton Under Lyne Town Hall
- Designated: 12 January 1967
- Reference no.: 1067995

Ashton Town Hall is a public building on Katherine Street in Ashton-under-Lyne, Greater Manchester, England. It is a Grade II listed building.

== History ==
The building, which was designed by Charles Lee in the Neoclassical style, was completed in 1840. The design involved a symmetrical main frontage with seven bays facing onto Katherine Street; the central section of five bays featured three round headed openings on the ground floor; there were sash windows on the first floor and four full-height Corinthian order columns supporting an entablature bearing the words "Erected AD MDCCCXL" (Erected 1840). Extended to the west in a similar style in 1878 by William Young, the hall was intended to provide areas for administrative purposes and public functions. A public library was established in the building in 1881 but removed to the new technical school in 1894.

Two Russian guns, which had been captured during the Crimean War, were installed outside the town hall in 1858. These guns were removed and melted down for materials during the Second World War.

The town hall was the headquarters of Ashton-under-Lyne municipal borough but ceased to be the local seat of government when Tameside Metropolitan Borough Council was formed in 1974. The vacant building became the home of the Museum of the Manchester Regiment, which had previously been based at Ladysmith Barracks, in 1987. Items on display related to the Manchester Regiment including six Victoria Crosses that had been awarded to former members of the regiment.

In 2002 two Turkish guns, which had been captured by the 2nd Battalion, the Royal Welch Fusiliers serving as part of the Cretan International Force at Candia in Crete in 1897 in the aftermath of the Greco-Turkish War, were moved from Hightown Barracks in Wrexham and installed outside the town hall to replace the Russian Guns. The Prince of Wales visited the recently refurbished Ladysmith Gallery at the museum in November 2002.

The museum closed in 2016 so that redevelopment works could be undertaken. Following delays with the main redevelopment works, following the collapse of the contractor, Carillion, the council approved urgent repair works to the parapet and roof of the building in January 2020.

== See also ==
- Listed buildings in Ashton-under-Lyne

== Sources ==
- Burke, Tom; Nevell, Mike (1996), Buildings of Tameside, Tameside Metropolitan Borough and University of Manchester Archaeological Unit, ISBN 1-871324-14-9
