= Rocquigny, Pas-de-Calais =

Rocquigny
- Commune
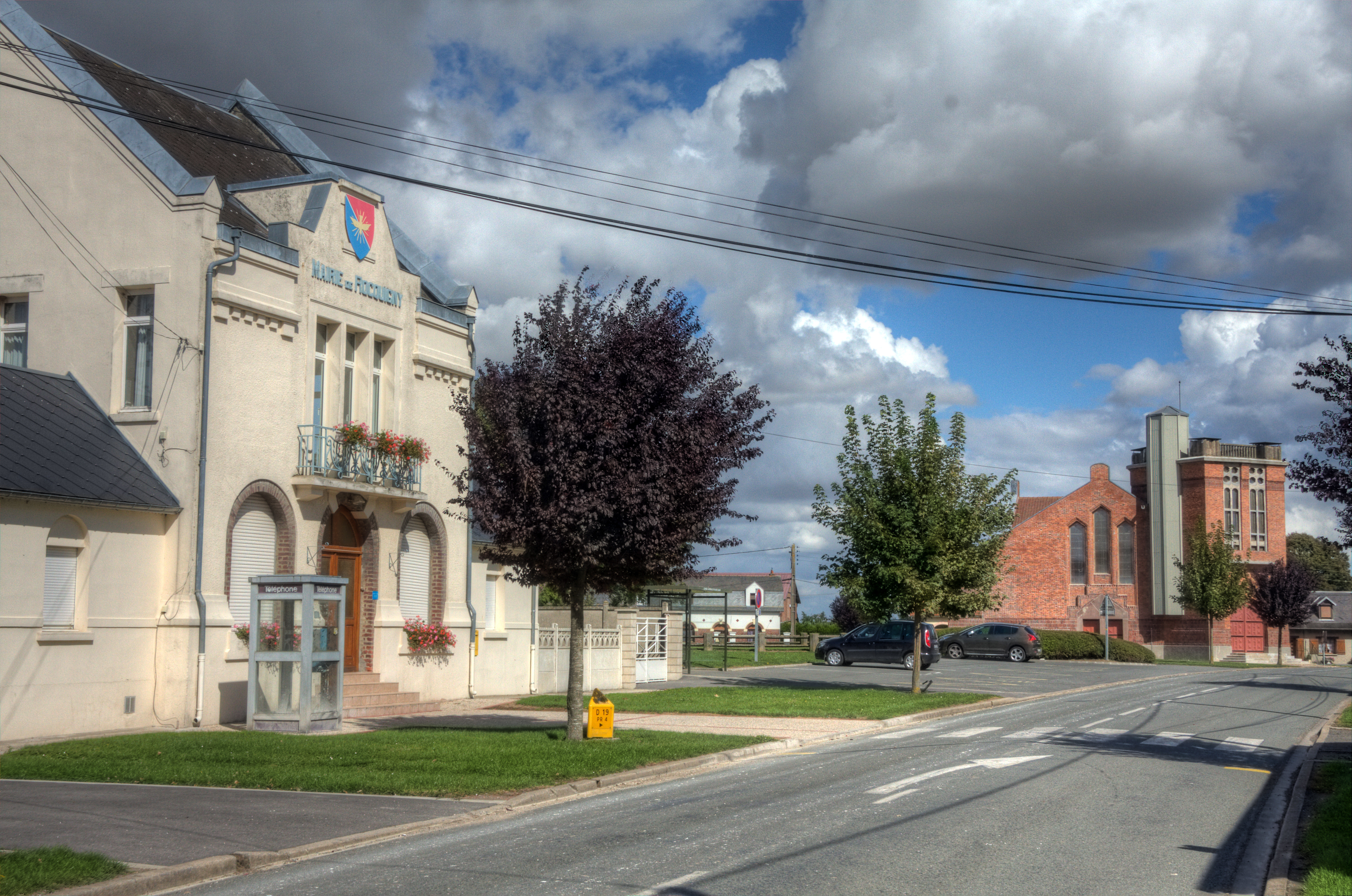
- The town hall and church of Rocquigny

- Coat of arms
- Location of Rocquigny
- Location within France Location within Hauts-de-France
- Coordinates: 50°03′37″N 2°55′46″E
- Country: France
- Region: Hauts-de-France
- Department: Pas-de-Calais
- Arrondissement: Arras
- Canton: Bapaume
- Intercommunality: CC Sud-Artois

Government
  - Mayor (2020–2026): Romain Van Caeneghem
- Area^{1}: 3.73 km^{2} (1.44 sq mi)
- Elevation: 132 m (433 ft)
- Highest elevation: 137 m (449 ft)
- Lowest elevation: 113 m (371 ft)
- Population (2023): 265
  - Density: 71.0/km^{2} (184/sq mi)
- Time zone: UTC+01:00 (CET)
  - Summer (DST): UTC+02:00 (CEST)
- INSEE/Postal code: 62715 /62450
- ^{1} French Land Register data, which excludes lakes, ponds, glaciers > 1 km^{2} (0.386 sq mi or 247 acres) and river estuaries.

Rocquigny (French pronunciation: [ʁɔkiɲi]) is a commune in the Pas-de-Calais department in the Hauts-de-France region of France. about 20 miles (32 km) south of Arras.

== Population ==
Historical population
Year	Pop.	±% p.a.
1968	356	—
1975	296	−2.60%
1982	271	−1.25%
1990	274	+0.14%
1999	281	+0.28%
2007	289	+0.35%
2012	282	−0.49%
2017	285	+0.21%
2023	265	−1.21%
Source: INSEE

== Places of interest ==
- The church of Notre-Dame, rebuilt along with the rest of the village, after the First World War. It became a listed monument in 2001. The steeple, that was in a state of collapse due to faulty concrete, was restored between 2003 and 2013.

== See also ==
- Communes of the Pas-de-Calais department
