= 96th Regiment of Foot =

96th Regiment of Foot (Queen's Own Germans)
- Active: 1798–1818; 1824–1881
- Country: Kingdom of Great Britain (1798–1800); United Kingdom (1801–1881)
- Branch: British Army
- Type: Infantry
- Nicknames: The Ups and Downs
- Engagements: French Revolutionary Wars; Napoleonic Wars; New Zealand Wars

The 96th Regiment of Foot was a British Army regiment, raised in 1798. Under the Childers reforms it amalgamated with the 63rd (West Suffolk) Regiment of Foot to form the Manchester Regiment.

== History ==
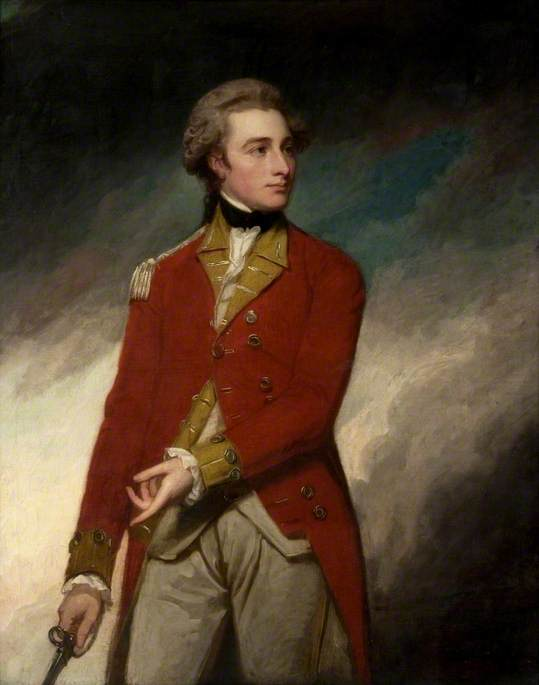
Lieutenant Colonel Sir Charles Stuart, founder of the regiment, by George Romney

=== Formation ===
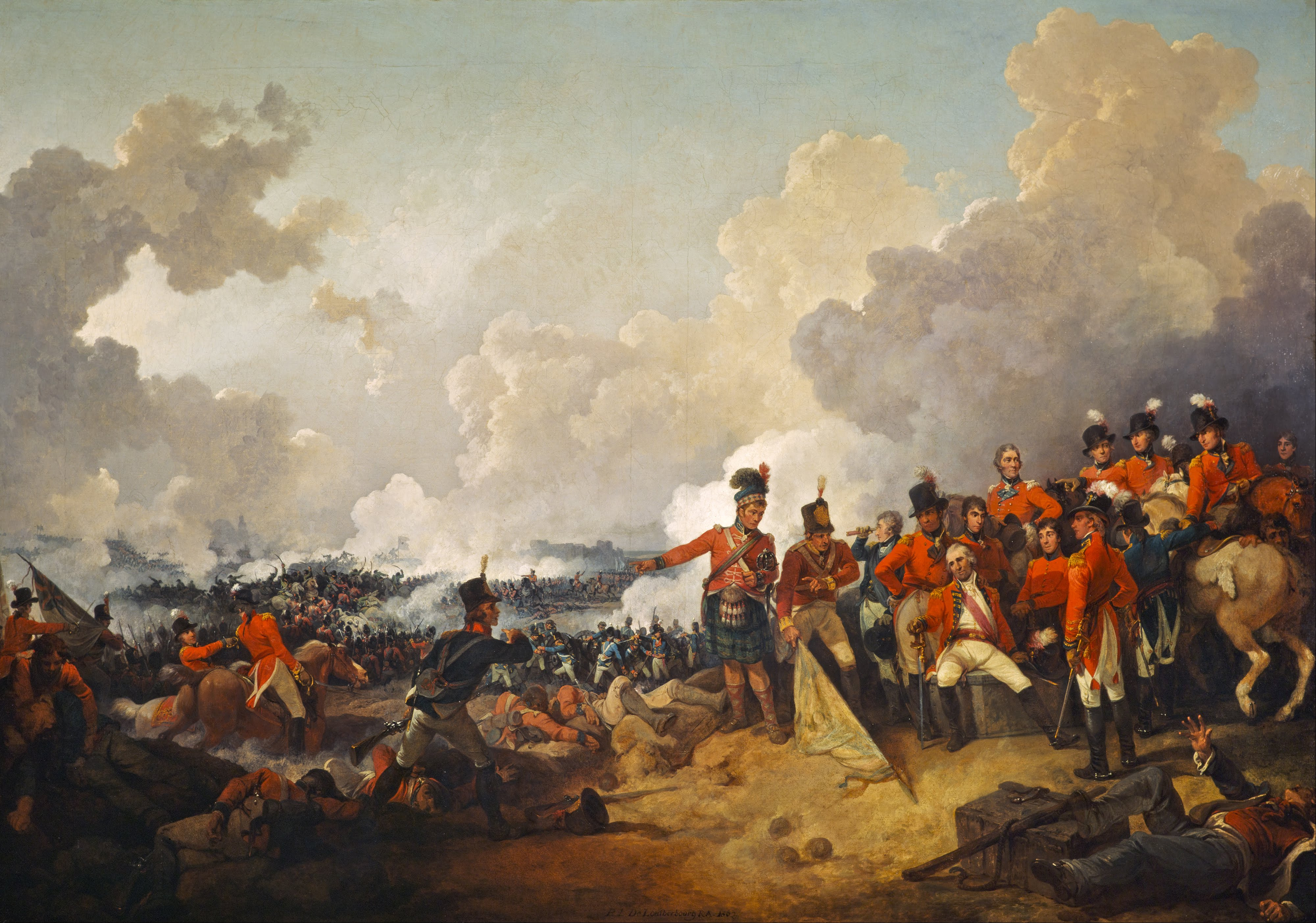
The Battle of Alexandria, 21 March 1801, by Philip James de Loutherbourg

The regiment was raised in Menorca (then called Minorca) as Stuart's Regiment by Lieutenant-General Sir Charles Stuart from German-speaking prisoners of war of Swiss regiments in Spanish service on 12 December 1798.

The regiment embarked for Gibraltar in October 1800 and then sailed on to Abu Qir in Egypt in January 1801 to take part in the Egyptian Campaign. At the Battle of Alexandria in March 1801, Private Antoine Lutz of the regiment distinguished himself by seizing the colour of the 21st Demi Brigade Legère. The colour had initially been captured by Sergeant Sinclair of the 42nd Regiment of Foot but after Sinclair fell in battle, a French officer recovered the colour for his country. Private Lutz shot the French officer holding the colour and took possession of the colour before being ridden over by French cavalry. As two dragoons charged towards him, Lutz claimed to have shot the horse from under one, whose life he spared. He returned to the British lines with both the colour and the captured dragoon. The regiment sailed for home in autumn 1801. It was renamed The Queen's Own German Regiment in 1802 and 97th (Queen's Own Germans) Regiment of Foot in January 1805.

=== Napoleonic Wars ===
In 1807 members of the regiment were lost in the sinking of the "Prince of Wales". The regiment embarked for Portugal in spring 1808 for service in the Peninsular War. It saw action at the Battle of Vimeiro in August 1808, the Battle of Talavera in July 1809 and the Battle of Bussaco in September 1810. It also fought at the First Siege of Badajoz In February 1811 and the Battle of Albuera in May 1811 before sailing for home in October 1811. The regiment was dispatched to Upper Canada in May 1814 and took part in the Siege of Fort Erie in August 1814 during the War of 1812 before arriving back home in July 1815. It was renumbered as the 96th (Queen's Own Germans) Regiment of Foot in February 1816 and was disbanded at Limerick in Ireland in December 1818.

=== The Victorian era ===
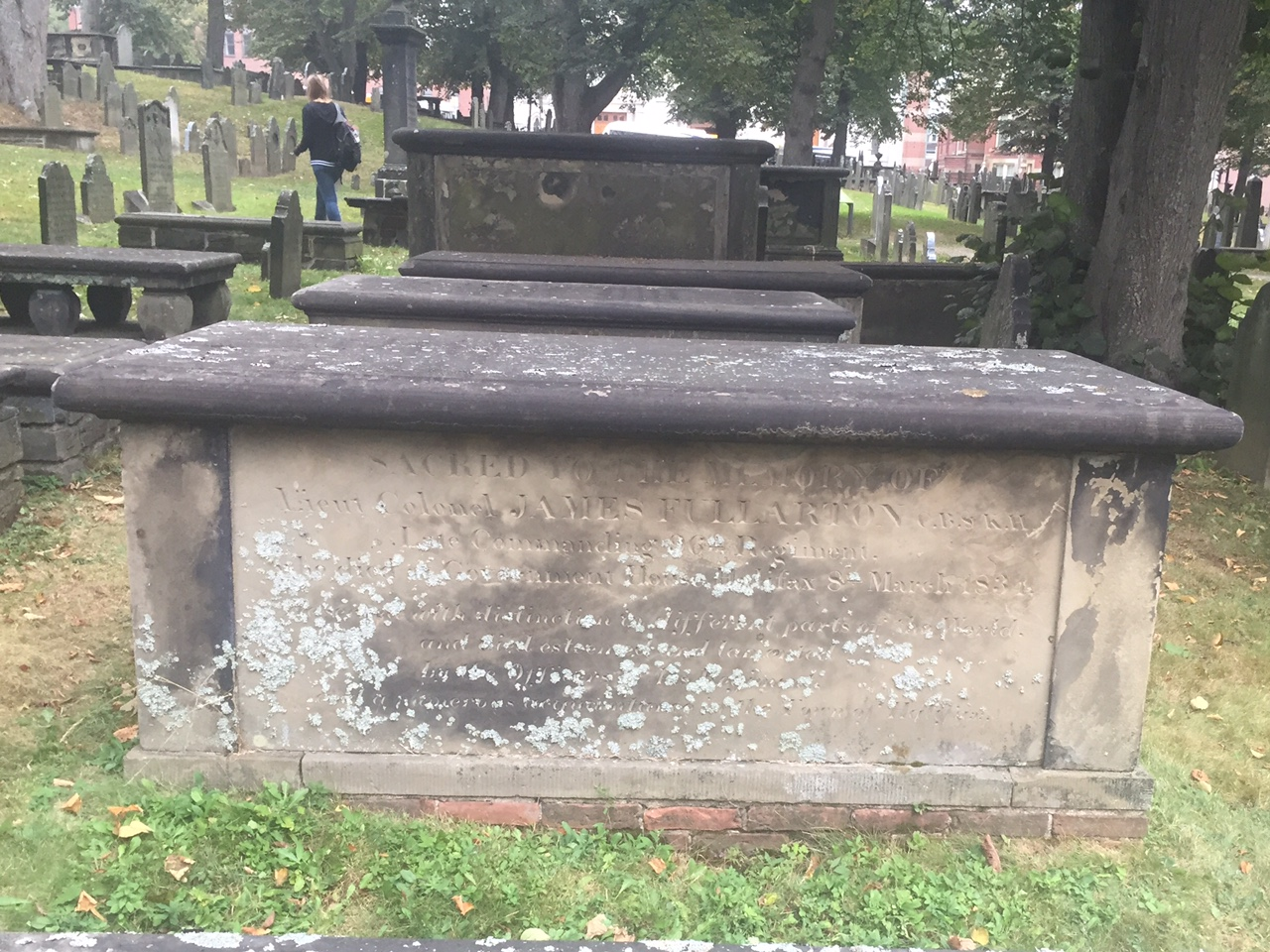
Lieut. Col James Fullarton, 96th Regiment, Old Burying Ground (Halifax, Nova Scotia)

The regiment was reformed (and subsequently confirmed as the successor of the predecessor formation with full continuity of battle honours), (Note: Confirmation was issued by the War Office in 1874) in response to the threat posed by the French intervention in Spain, in January 1824. The regiment embarked for Halifax, Nova Scotia in summer 1824, transferred to Bermuda in 1825 and then returned to Halifax in 1828 before embarking for home in 1835. Between December 1839 and August 1841, it provided detachments for convict ships sailing to New South Wales, Van Diemen's Land, South Australia and Western Australia.

In 1843, amid tensions in New Zealand between British settlers and Māoris related to breaches of the Treaty of Waitangi, a detachment from the regiment was dispatched to the North Island of New Zealand. Four members of the regiment were killed in action at the flagstaff blockhouse when captured by a large Māori force during the Battle of Kororāreka in the Bay of Islands on 11 March 1845; the blockhouse crew were forced to withdraw to the lower blockhouse.

The regiment embarked for India in 1849 and, after returning to England in 1855, sailed for Gibraltar in 1856. It embarked for Canada in February 1862 to help suppress attacks by Fenians. One of the transport ships had to seek refuge in the Azores for a week in the face of extremely poor weather. The regiment spent only a brief time in Canada, the crisis having subsided, and returned to England in April 1862. The regiment deployed to the Cape of Good Hope in 1863 and then travelled on to India in 1865 before returning home in 1875.

As part of the Cardwell Reforms of the 1870s, where single-battalion regiments were linked together to share a single depot and recruiting district in the United Kingdom, the 96th was linked with the 63rd (West Suffolk) Regiment of Foot, and assigned to district no. 16 at Wellington Barracks in Ashton-under-Lyne. On 1 July 1881 the Childers Reforms came into effect and the regiment amalgamated with the 63rd (West Suffolk) Regiment of Foot to form the Manchester Regiment.

== Battle honours ==
Battle honours won by the regiment (or its predecessors) were:

- Egypt (inherited from the Minorca Regiment) (1801)
- Peninsular (inherited from 96th (Queen's Own Germans) Regiment of Foot)
- New Zealand (1846-1847)

== Colonels of the regiments ==
Colonels of the regiments were:

=== The Minorca Regiment - (1798) ===
- 1798: Lt-Gen. Sir Charles Stuart

=== 97th (later the 96th) (Queen's Own Germans) Regiment of Foot - (1816) ===
- 1806–1814: F.M. Thomas Grosvenor
- 1814–?1818: Gen. Sir Gordon Drummond, GCB
- Disbanded in Ireland, 1818

=== 96th Regiment of Foot - (1824) ===
- 1824–1832: Lt-Gen. Sir Joseph Fuller, GCH
- 1832–1834: Lt-Gen. Sir Lionel Smith, 1st Baronet, GCB, GCH
- 1834–1839: Lt-Gen. Sir William Thornton, KCB
- 1839–1852: Gen. Sir Lewis Grant, KCH
- 1852–1855: Lt-Gen. Charles Edward Conyers, CB
- 1855–1860: Gen. Mildmay Fane
- 1860–1863: Gen. George Macdonald
- 1863–1866: Maj-Gen. Sir Charles Warren, KCB
- 1866–1869: Gen. Hon. Sir Augustus Almeric Spencer, GCB
- 1869–1872: Lt-Gen. George Thomas Conolly Napier, CB
- 1872–1877: Lt-Gen. Thomas Crombie
- 1877–1881: Gen. Thomas Maitland Wilson
