= Ladysmith Barracks =

- Ashton-under-Lyne
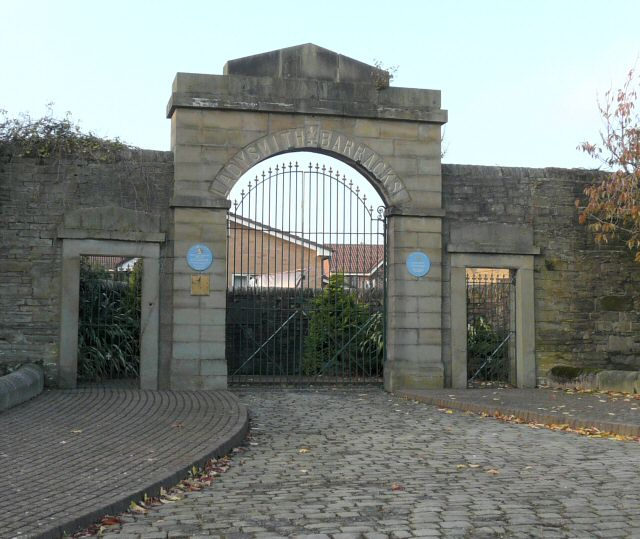
- Entrance to Ladysmith Barracks

Site information
- Type: Barracks
- Owner: Ministry of Defence
- Operator: British Army

Location
- Location within Greater Manchester
- Coordinates: 53.49839°N 2.06569°W

Site history
- Built: 1841-1843
- Built for: War Office
- In use: 1843-1958

Garrison information
- Occupants: Manchester Regiment

Ladysmith Barracks was a British military installation on Mossley Road, Ashton-under-Lyne, Greater Manchester.

== History ==
The barracks were originally established under the name of Wellington Barracks, in response to the threat from civil unrest associated with the Chartist movement, as accommodation for cavalry regiments between 1841 and 1843. In 1873 a system of recruiting areas based on counties was instituted under the Cardwell Reforms and the barracks became the depot for the 63rd (West Suffolk) Regiment of Foot, the 96th Regiment of Foot and the 6th Royal Lancashire Militia. Following the Childers Reforms, the 63rd and 96th Regiments amalgamated as 1st and 2nd Battalions of the Manchester Regiment, with the 6th RL as its 3rd and 4th Battalions. The regiment had its depot at the barracks in 1881. The name of the barracks was changed to commemorate the actions of the Manchester Regiment at the Siege of Ladysmith during the Second Boer War.

During the Second World War the barracks served as home to the 14th Technical Training Centre of the Royal Electrical and Mechanical Engineers. The Manchester Regiment amalgamated with the King's Regiment (Liverpool) to form the King's Regiment in 1958 and the barracks were decommissioned. They were demolished in 1985 and the site was subsequently redeveloped for residential use. A blue plaque now commemorates the location.
