= ALCC =

ALCC may refer to:

- Airborne Launch Control Center, a portion of the US Air Force's Airborne Launch Control System
- Anglo-Lutheran Catholic Church, an American Evangelical Catholic Christian denomination
- Ashton Ladysmith Cricket Club, an English cricket club
