= Ashton-under-Lyne =

Market town in Greater Manchester, England

Coordinates: 53°29′14″N 2°5′51″W

- Town
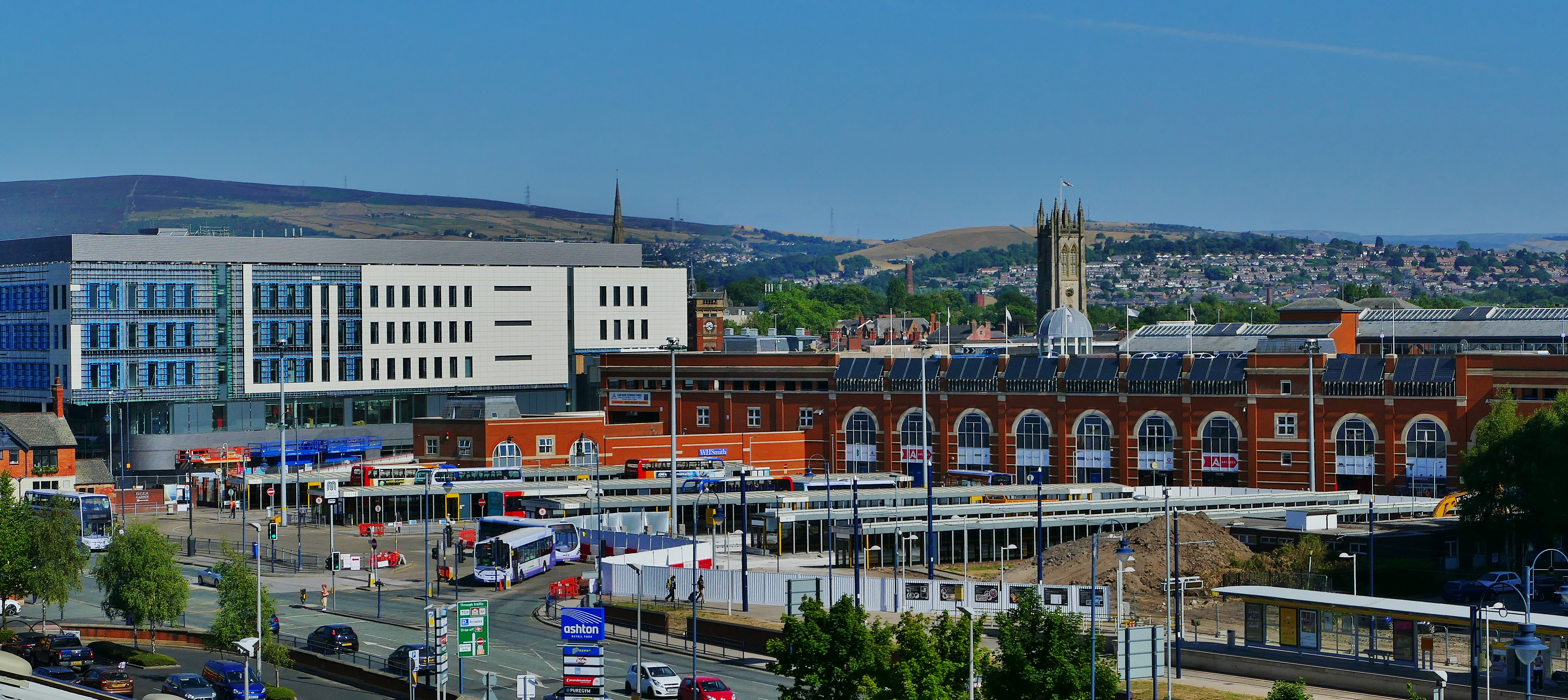
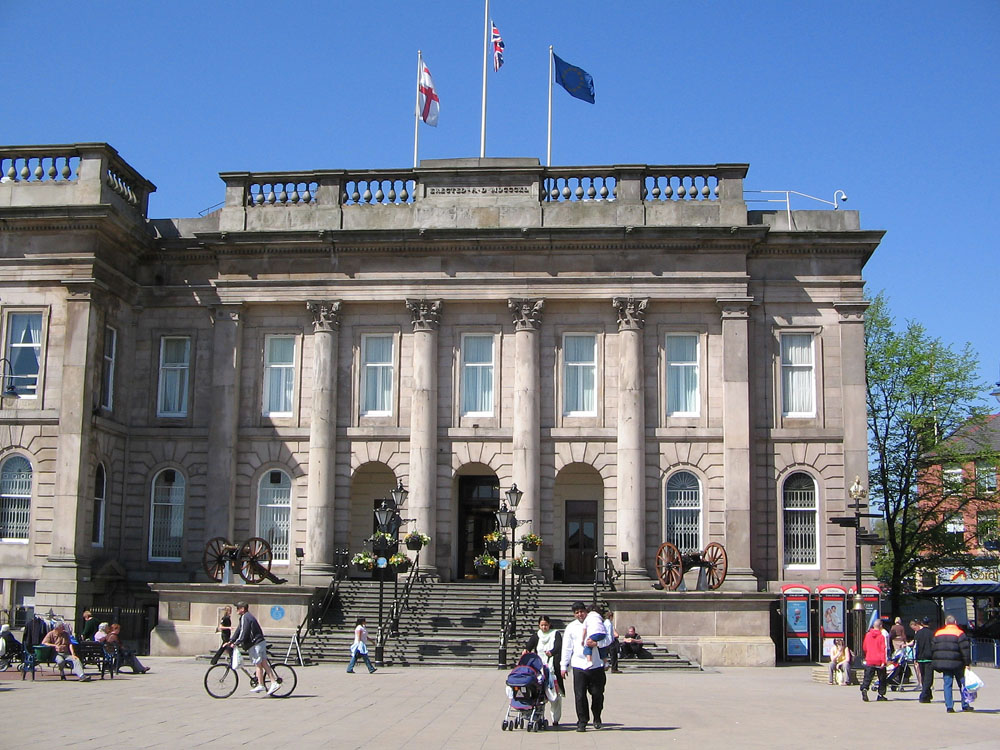
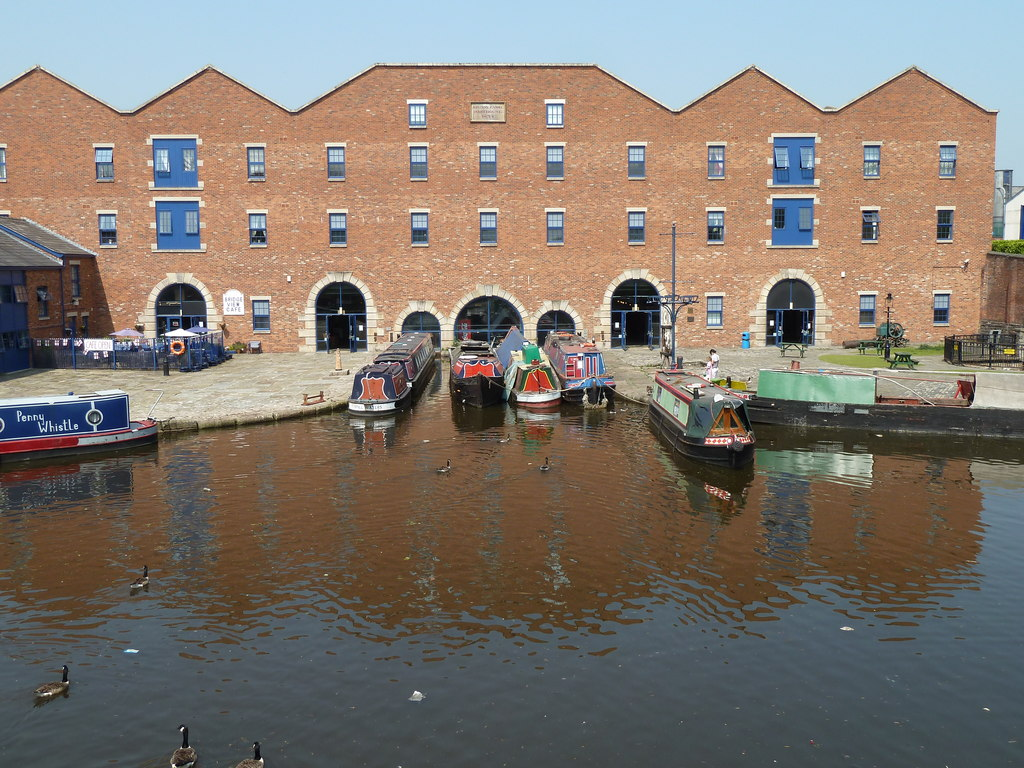
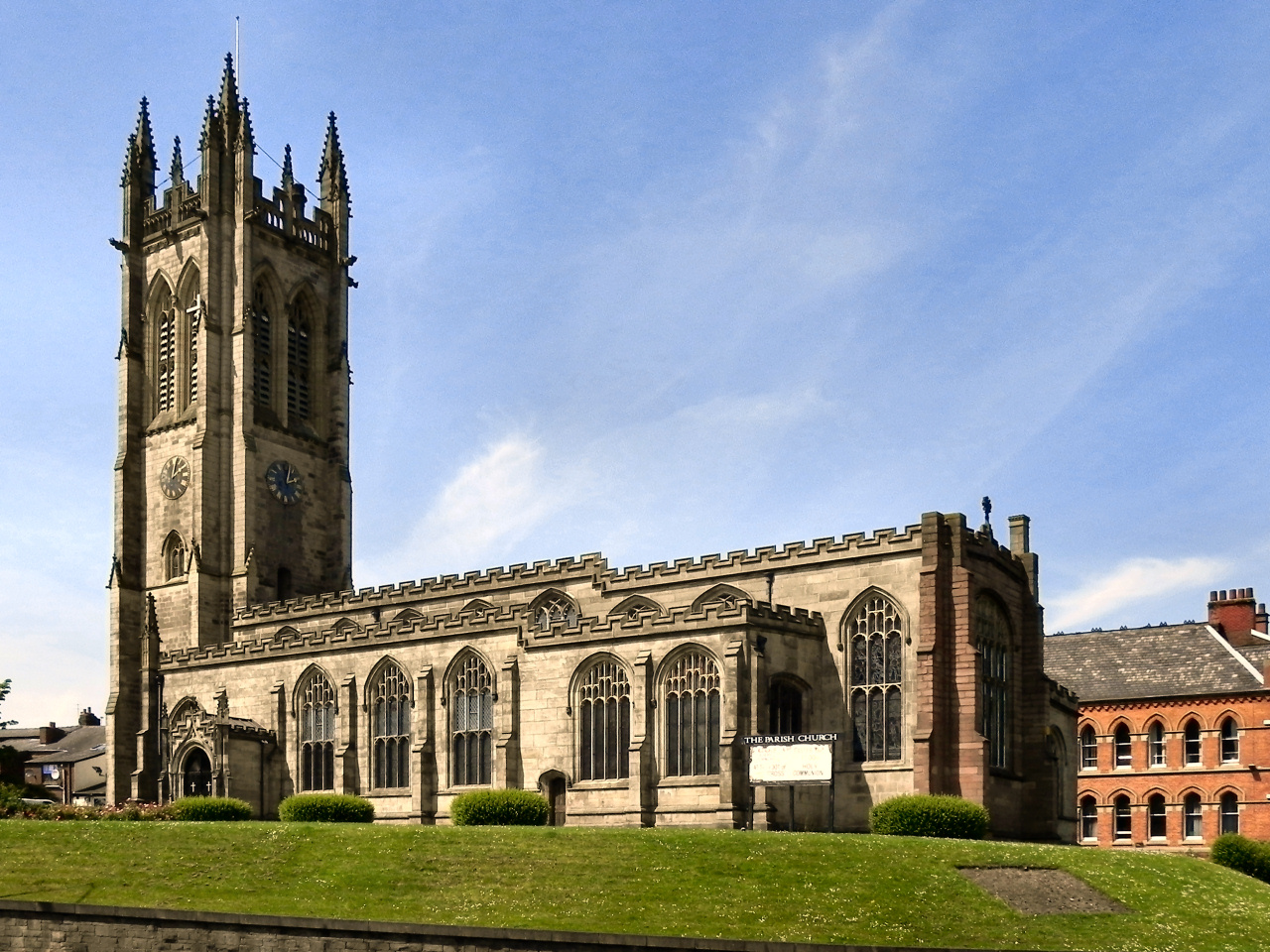
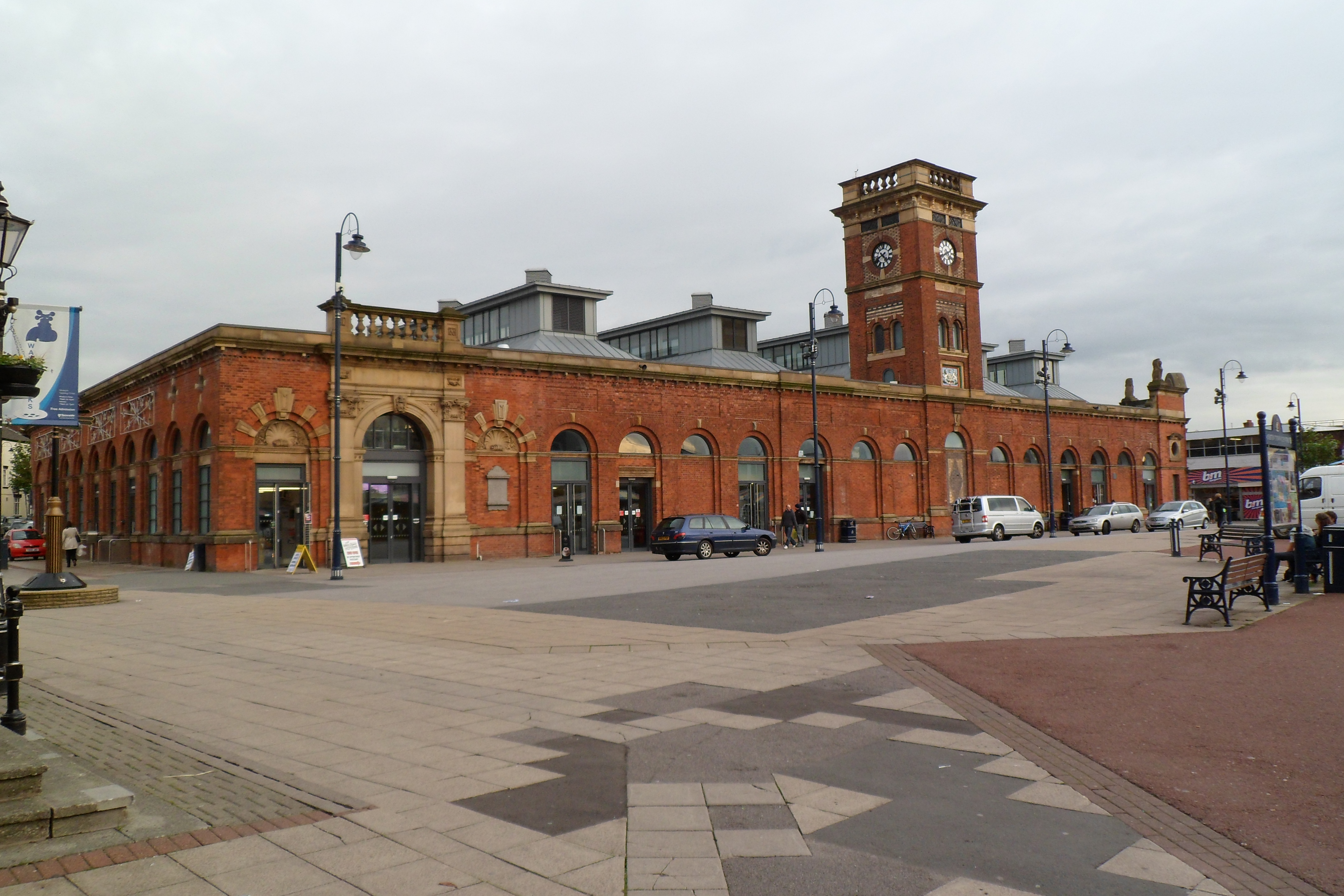
- Town centre Town hall Portland Basin St Michael and All Angels' Church Market hall

- Location within Greater Manchester
- Population: 48,604 (2021 census)
  - Density: 8,360/mi² (3,227/km²)
- OS grid reference: SJ931997
  - London: 160 mi (257 km) SSE
- Metropolitan borough: Tameside
- Metropolitan county: Greater Manchester
- Region: North West
- Country: England
- Sovereign state: United Kingdom
- Post town: ASHTON-UNDER-LYNE
- Postcode district: OL6, OL7
- Dialling code: 0161
- Police: Greater Manchester
- Fire: Greater Manchester
- Ambulance: North West
- UK Parliament: Ashton-under-Lyne

Ashton-under-Lyne, also known as Ashton, is a market town in the Metropolitan Borough of Tameside, Greater Manchester, England. Its population was 48,604 at the 2021 census. Historically a part of Lancashire, it is located on the north bank of the river Tame, in the foothills of the Pennines and 6 miles (9.7 km) east of Manchester.

Evidence of Stone Age, Bronze Age and Viking activity has been discovered in Ashton-under-Lyne. The "Ashton" part of the town's name probably dates from the Anglo-Saxon period, and derives from Old English meaning "settlement by ash trees". The origin of the "under-Lyne" suffix is less clear; it possibly derives from the Brittonic-originating word lemo meaning elm or from Ashton's proximity to the Pennines. In the Middle Ages, it was a parish and township and Ashton Old Hall was held by the de Asshetons, lords of the manor. The town became a market town from 1414, when the manor was granted a royal charter.

The introduction of the cotton trade in 1769 transformed Ashton both economically and geographically, with the town being replanned in a grid. The factory system and textile manufacture during the Industrial Revolution triggered a process of unplanned urbanisation in the area and, by the mid-19th century, Ashton had emerged as an important mill town at a convergence of newly constructed canals and railways. Ashton-under-Lyne's transport network allowed for an economic boom in cotton spinning, weaving and coal mining, which led to the granting of municipal borough status in 1847. The population grew from 2,859 in 1775 to 34,886 in 1861, two-thirds of its modern-day size, as a direct result of this extensive industrialisation.

The town saw significant economic decline in the 1920s, with the majority of its mills closing due to insufficient exports. Nevertheless, the town has continued to thrive as a centre of commerce and Ashton Market is one of the largest outdoor markets in the United Kingdom. In response to high levels of unemployment and deprivation since the town's deindustrialisation, the town underwent extensive regeneration over the course of the late 1990s and early 2000s. Modelled on the nearby town of Hyde, this included both local infrastructure improvements and a focus on training and education. The bus and tram networks were integrated into a single hub which opened in 2020, with further plans to connect with the National Rail station as well.

A second wave of local regeneration has begun in the 2020s, with the mayor of Greater Manchester, Andy Burnham, designating the area as a Mayoral Development Zone and promising investment into housing, businesses and green space. Ashton Town Centre is now home to the Ashton Arcades shopping centre (opened 1995), a large IKEA store (opened 2006) and Ashton Market (reopened 2008), which was voted the best in the country in 2014. Further development of the outdoor market is continuing with the replacement of over 100 stalls by a canopied area with cabins and stalls.

== History ==
=== Pre-industrial ===
Evidence of prehistoric activity in the area is found at Ashton Moss, a 260-acre (107 ha) peat bog and is the only one of Tameside's 22 Mesolithic sites not located in the hilly uplands in the north-east of the borough. A single Mesolithic flint tool was discovered in the bog, alongside a collection of nine Neolithic flints. There was further activity in or around the bog in the Bronze Age. In about 1911, an adult male skull was found in the moss; it was thought to belong to the Romano-British period, similar to the Lindow Man bog body, until radiocarbon dating revealed that it dated from 1,320 to 970 BC.

The eastern terminus of the early medieval linear earthwork Nico Ditch is in Ashton Moss; (Note: Location: grid reference SJ909980.) it was probably used as an administrative boundary and dates from the eighth or ninth century. Legend claims it was built in a single night in 869 or 870, as a defence against Viking invaders. Further evidence of Dark Age activity in the area comes from the town's name. The "Ashton" part probably derives from the Anglo-Saxon meaning "settlement by ash trees"; the origin of the "under-Lyne" element is less clear: it could derive from the British lemo meaning elm, or refer to Ashton being "under the line" of the Pennines. This means that Ashton probably became a settlement some time after the Romans left Britain in the fifth century. An early form of the town's name included the morpheme "burh"; this indicates that, in the 11th century, Ashton and Bury were two of the most important towns in Lancashire. The "under Lyne" suffix was not widely used until the mid-19th century, when it became useful for distinguishing the town from other places called Ashton.

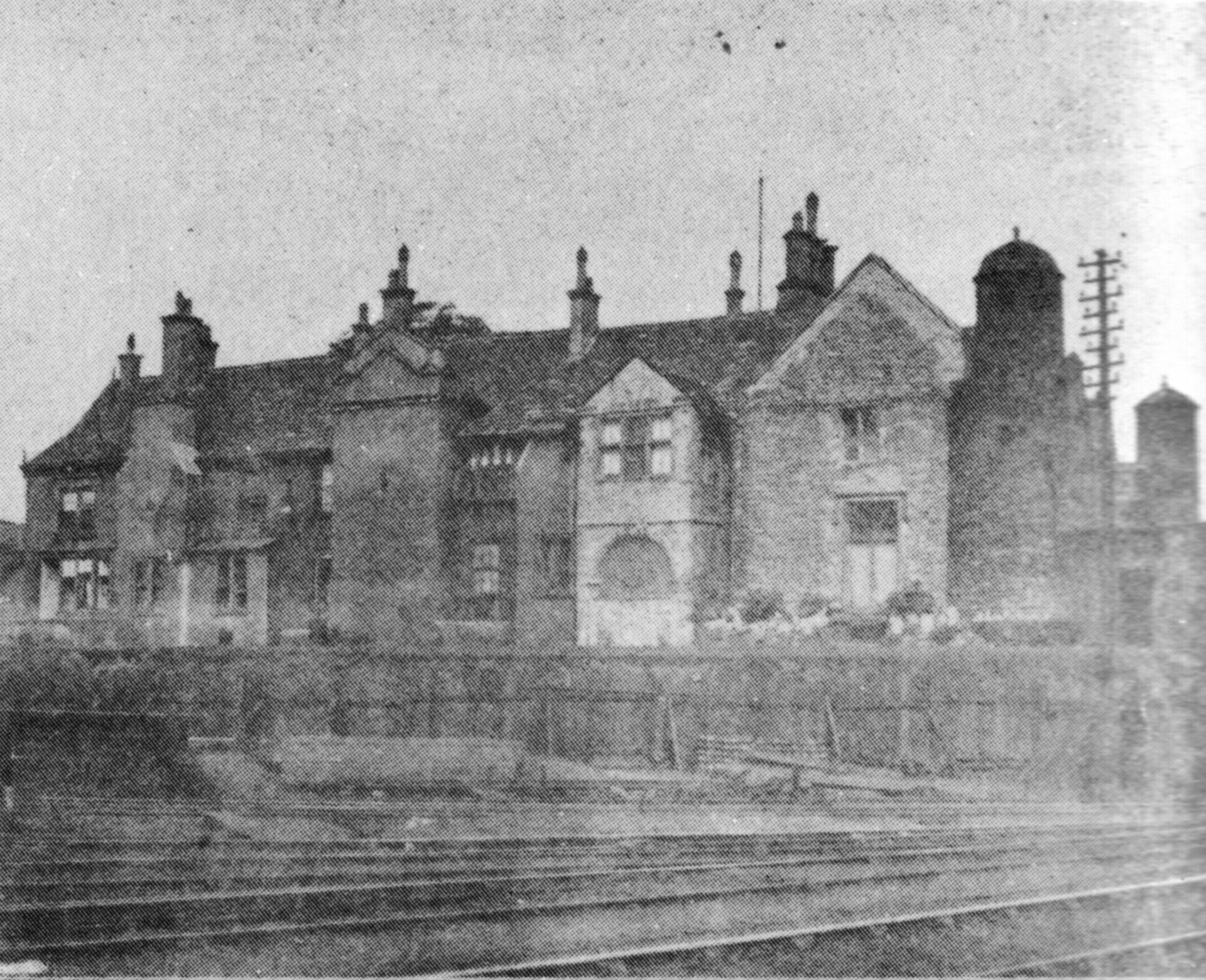
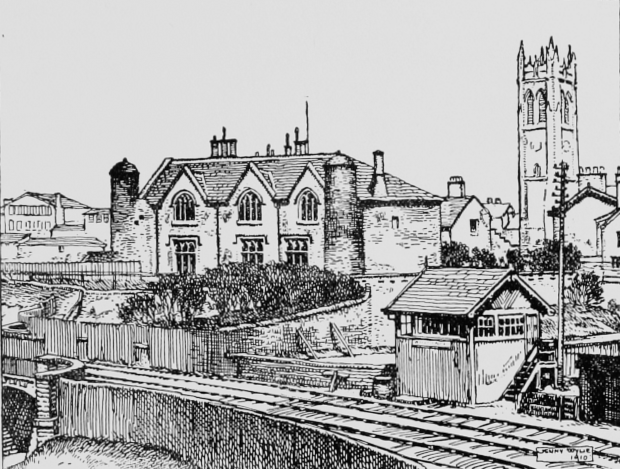
A photograph of Ashton Old Hall before its demolition in 1890 (above) and a print created after its demolition, based on earlier works (below)

The Domesday Survey of 1086 does not directly mention Ashton, perhaps because only a partial survey of the area had been taken. There is doubt whether the St Michael's Church mentioned in the Domesday entry for the ancient parish of Manchester was in Ashton.

The town itself was first mentioned in the 12th century when the manor was part of the barony of Manchester. The town was also spelt Asheton, Asshton and Assheton in this period. By the late 12th century, a family who adopted the name Assheton held the manor on behalf of the Gresles, barons of Manchester. Ashton Old Hall was a manor house, the administrative centre of the manor and the seat of the de Ashton or de Assheton family. With three wings, the hall was described by historians Nevell and Walker as "one of the finest great houses in the North West" of the 14th century. It has been recognised as important for being one of the few great houses in south-east Lancashire and possibly one of the few halls influenced by French design in the country. The town was granted a royal charter in 1414, which allowed it to hold a fair twice a year, and a market on every Monday, making the settlement a market town.

According to popular tradition, Sir Ralph de Assheton, who was lord of the manor in the mid-14th century and known as the Black Knight, was an unpopular and cruel feudal lord. After his death, his unpopularity led the locals to parade an effigy of him around the town each Easter Monday and collect money. The effigy would then be hung up, shot and set on fire, before being torn apart and thrown into the crowd. The first recorded occurrence of the event was in 1795, although the tradition may be older; it continued into the 1830s.

The manor remained in the possession of the Assheton family until 1514, when their male line ended. The lordship of the manor passed to Sir George Booth, great-great-grandson of Sir Thomas Ashton, devolving through the Booth family until the Earls of Stamford inherited it through marriage in 1758. The Booth-Greys then held the manor until the 19th century; their patronage, despite being absentee lords, was probably the stimulus for Ashton's growth of a large-scale domestic-based textile industry in the 17th century. In the medieval period, farming was important in Ashton, particularly arable farming.

=== Industrialisation ===
With the Industrial Revolution in the second half of the 18th century, the textile industry in the town boomed. It continued to expand until the cotton famine of 1861–65, after which the industry remained steady until it collapsed after the overseas markets shut down in the 1920s. Until the introduction of the cotton trade in 1769, Ashton had been considered "bare, wet and almost worthless", but the introduction of the trade transformed the town's economy; in the 1700s, 33% of those with jobs worked in textiles and 36% in agriculture. Pre-industrial Ashton was centred on four roads: Town Street, Crickets Lane, Old Street and Cowhill Lane. In the late 18th and early 19th centuries, the town was replanned, with a grid pattern of roads. As a result, very little remains of the previous town. In 1730, a workhouse was established that consisted of a house and two cottages; it later came to be used as a hospital. The Ashton Canal was constructed in the 1790s to transport coal from the area to Manchester, with a branch to the coal pits at Fairbottom.

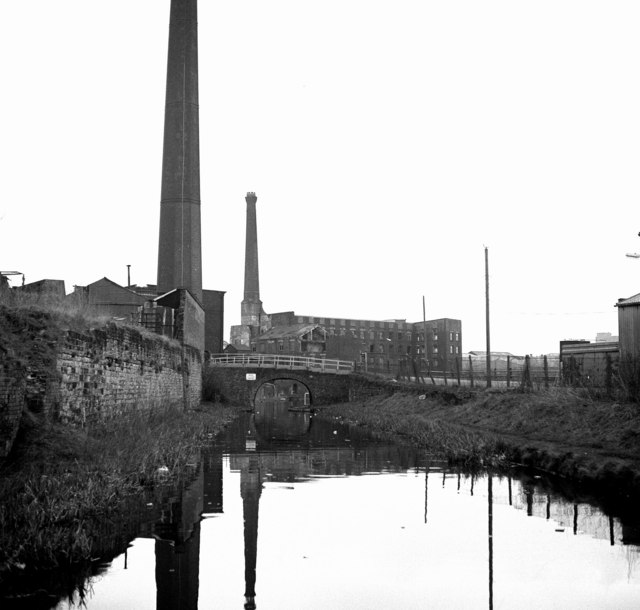
Following the Industrial Revolution, Ashton became a mill town at the centre of a network of canals and railways.

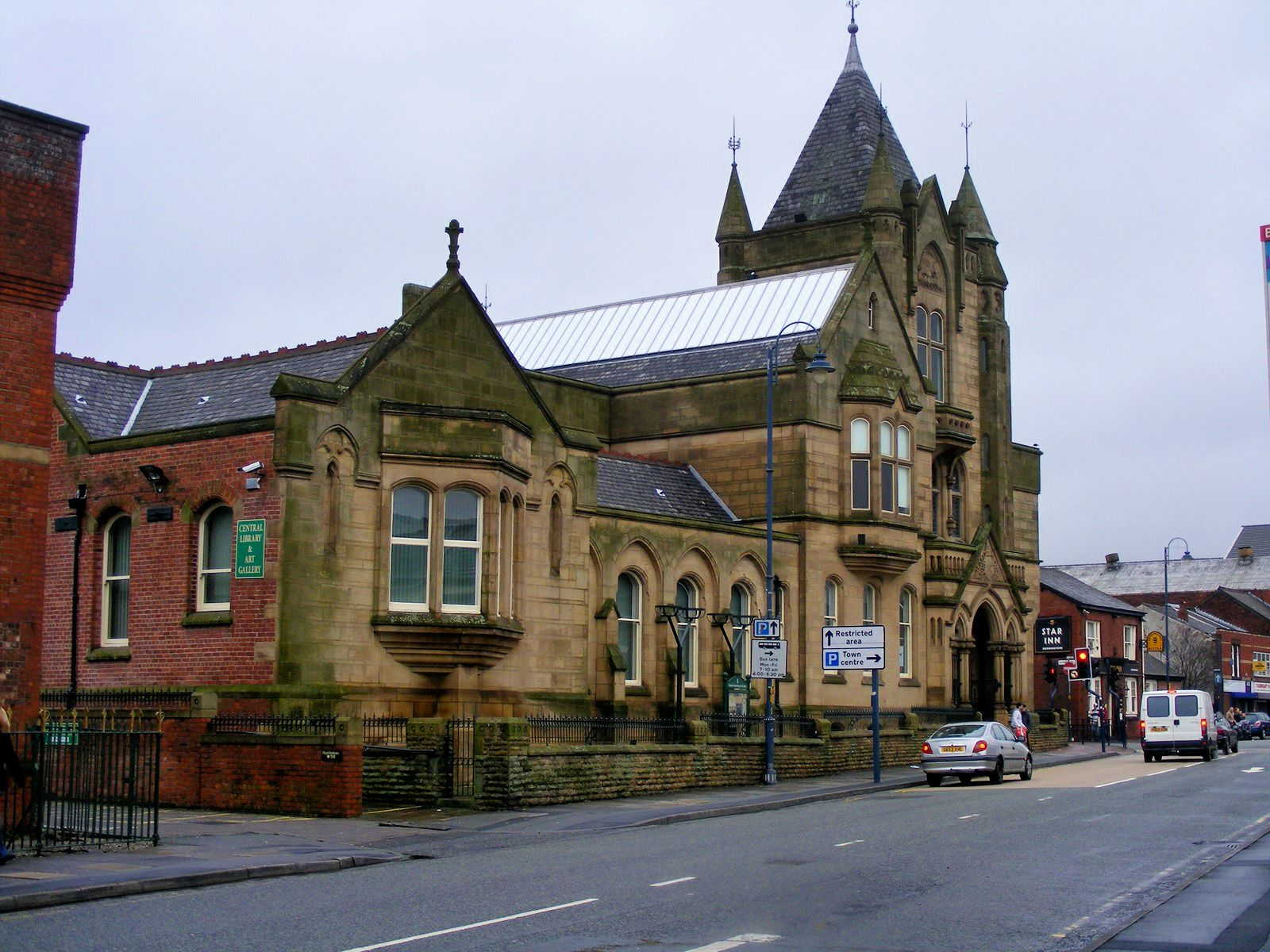
Ashton Town Library was built in the second half of the 19th century.

Domestic fustian and woollen weaving have a long history in the town, dating back to at least the Early Modern period. Accounts dating from 1626 highlight that Humphrey Chetham had dealings with clothworkers in Ashton. Coal has been mined in the area since at least the 17th century, but it was in the late 18th and early 19th centuries that demand for coal increased, which led to an expansion of the town's coal industry. The produce of the collieries was transported by canal to Manchester. The industry began to decline during the late 19th century and, by 1904, only the Ashton Moss Colliery was still operational, the last colliery to be opened in the area.

The introduction of the factory system in the 19th century, during the Industrial Revolution, changed Ashton from a market town to a mill town. Having previously been one of the two main towns in the Tame Valley, Ashton-under-Lyne became one of the "most famous mill towns in the North West". On Christmas Day 1826, workers in the town formed the Ashton Unity, a sickness and benefits society that was later renamed the Loyal Order of Ancient Shepherds. From 1773 to 1905, 75 cotton mills were established in the town. On his tour of northern England in 1849, Scottish publisher Angus Reach said:

In Ashton, too, there lingers on a handful of miserable old men, the remnants of the cotton hand-loom weavers. No young persons think of pursuing such an occupation. The few who practice it were too old and confirmed in old habits, when the power-loom was introduced, to be able to learn a new way of making their bread.

— Angus Reach, Morning Chronicle, 1849

The cotton industry in the area grew rapidly from the start of the 19th century until the Lancashire Cotton Famine of 1861–65. The growth of the town's textile industry led to the construction of estates specifically for workers. Workers' housing in Park Bridge, on the border between Ashton and Oldham, was created in the 1820s. The iron works were founded in 1786 and were some of the earliest in the North West. The Oxford Mills settlement was founded in 1845 by the local industrialist and mill-owner Hugh Mason, who saw it as a model industrial community. The community was provided with a recreational ground, a gymnasium and an institute containing public baths, a library and a reading room. Mason estimated that establishing the settlement cost him around £10,000 and would require a further £1,000 a year to maintain (the equivalent of £1,100,000 and £110,000 respectively, as at 2025) and that its annual mortality rate was significantly lower than in the rest of the town.

A poor supply of fresh water and dwellings without adequate drainage led to a cholera outbreak in the town in 1832. The Ashton Poor Law Union was established in 1837 and covered most of what is now Tameside. A new workhouse was built in 1850, providing housing for 500 people; it later became part of Tameside General Hospital. Construction on the Sheffield, Ashton-under-Lyne and Manchester Railway (SA&MR) began in 1837 to provide passenger transport between Manchester and Sheffield. Although a nine-arch viaduct in Ashton collapsed in April 1845, the line was fully opened on 22 December 1845. The SA&MR was amalgamated with the Sheffield and Lincolnshire Junction Railway, the Great Grimsby & Sheffield Railway, and the Grimsby Docks Company in 1847 to form the Manchester, Sheffield and Lincolnshire Railway (MS&LR). In 1890, the MS&LR bought the Old Hall and demolished it to make way for the construction of new sidings.

Ashton town centre, which is the largest in Tameside, developed in the Victorian period. Many of the original buildings have survived and as a result, the town centre is protected by Tameside Council as a conservation area. In the late 19th century, public buildings such as the market hall, town hall, public library and public baths were built. A donation from Hugh Mason funded the construction of the baths built in 1870–71. The Ashton-under-Lyne Improvement Act was passed in 1886 which gave the borough influence over housing and allowed the imposition of minimum standards such as drainage. Coal mining was not as important to the town as the textile industry, but in 1882 the Ashton Moss Colliery had the deepest mine shaft in the world at 2,850 feet (870 m). Ashton's textile industry remained constant between 1865 and the 1920s. Although some mills closed or merged, the number of spindles in use increased. With the collapse of the overseas market in the 1920s, the town's cotton industry went into decline and, by the 1930s, most of the firms and mills in the area had closed.

=== Modern ===
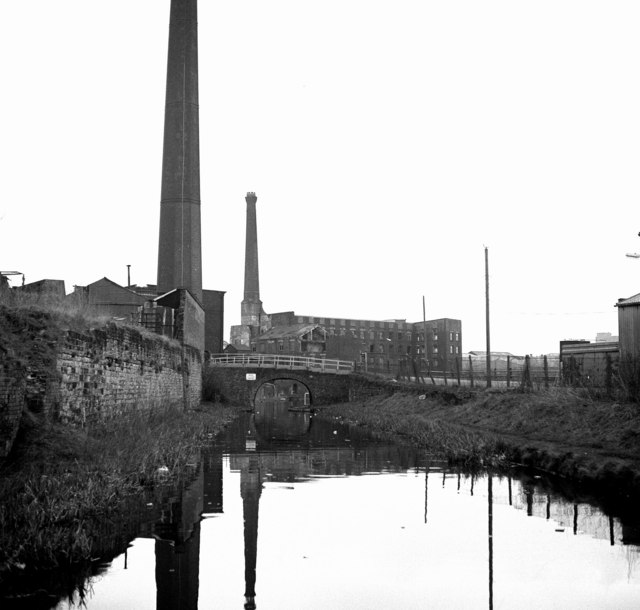
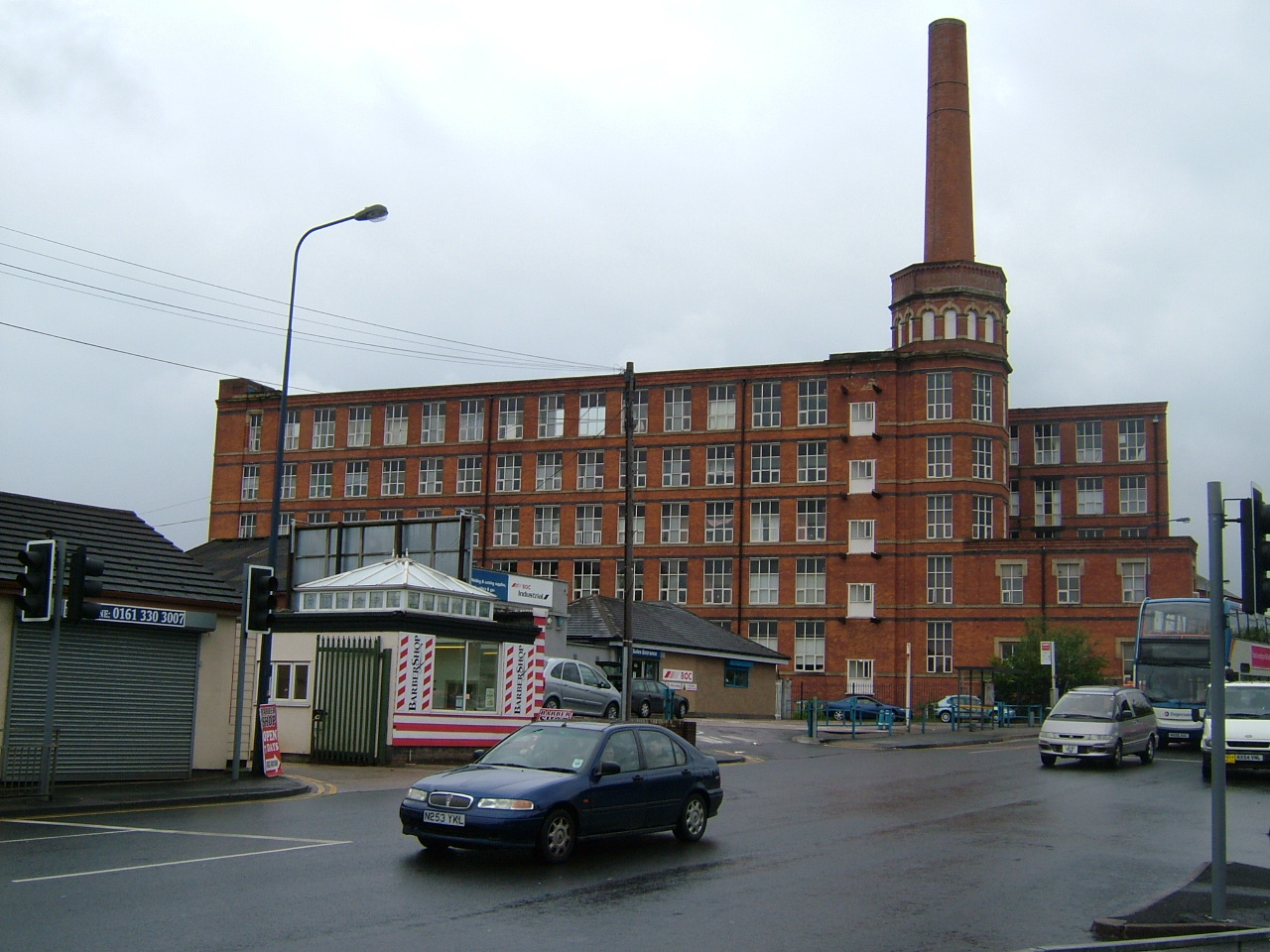
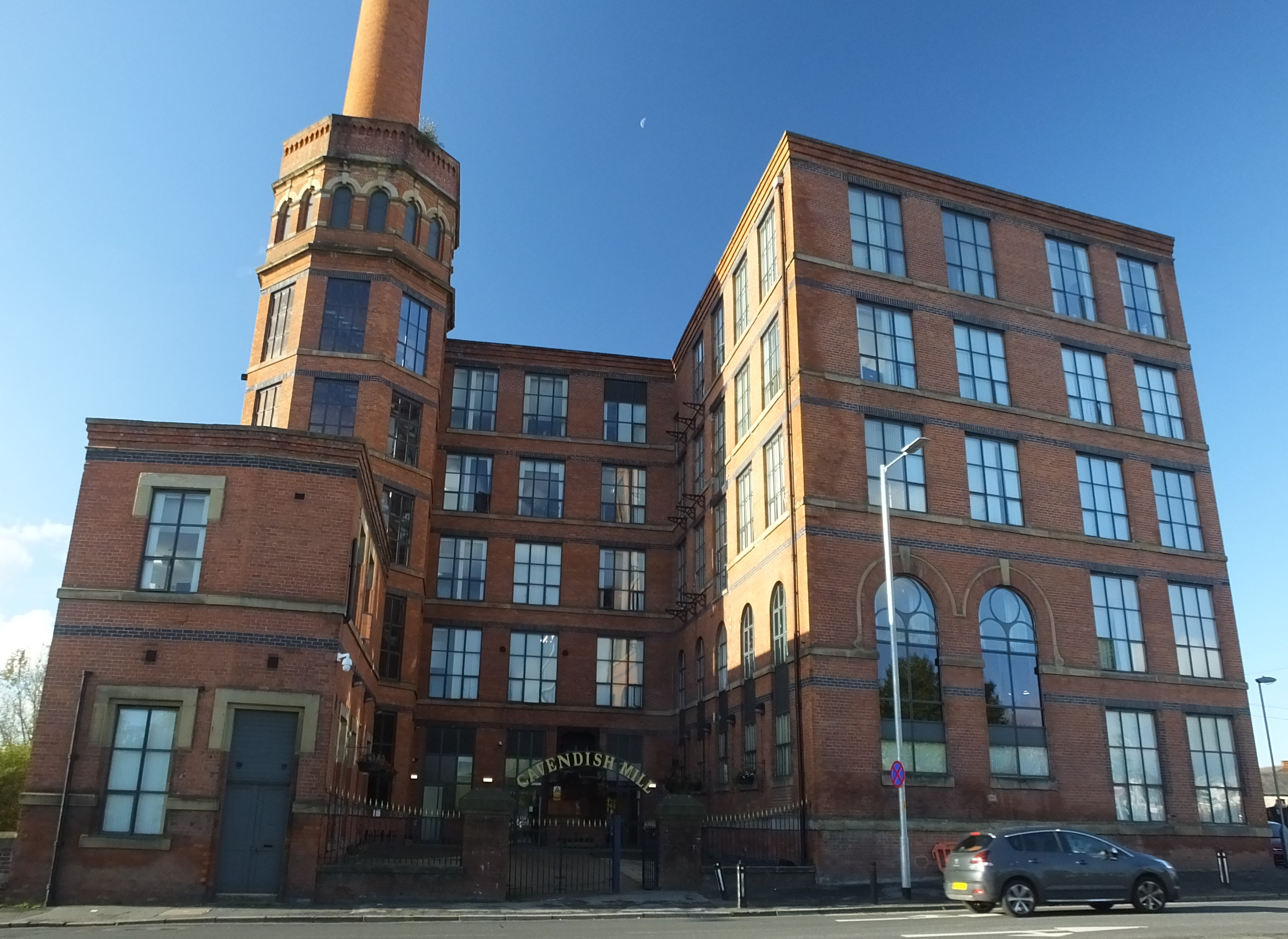
The town's regeneration: the derelict Cavendish Mill in April 1981, the converted building in 2009 and following renovation in 2016.

On 13 June 1917, a fire in an ammunition factory producing TNT caused an explosion that destroyed much of the west end of the town. Two gasometers exploded and the explosion destroyed the factory and threw heavy objects long distances. At least 41 people died and about 100 were injured. Sylvain Dreyfus, managing director of the works, helped to fight the fire but died in the subsequent explosion.

The second of the five victims of the Moors murders, 12-year-old John Kilbride, lived in the town. He was lured away from the market on 23 November 1963 by Ian Brady and Myra Hindley, before being murdered and buried on Saddleworth Moor. His body was found in October 1965.

Ashton became a part of the newly formed Metropolitan Borough of Tameside in 1974. In 1996, after the success of a similar project in the nearby town of Hyde, the council pursued the creation of the Ashton Renewal Area in the town, a designation created by the Local Government and Housing Act of 1989. The report on creating the renewal area suggested Ashton had "extremely high levels of unemployment" at 22% and "some of the worst private sector housing conditions" in Tameside – the Ashton St. Peter's ward was the most deprived in the borough according to the 2000 Indices of Multiple Deprivation. The programme aimed to support people in accessing education, training and employment opportunities, as well as creating those opportunities through the regeneration of the town itself. Examples of infrastructural improvements listed in the 2005 council report on the project included the Arcades Shopping Centre, the Ladysmith Shopping Centre, the bus station and the market; statistics also suggested a fall in crime; however, critics of the programme noted the lack of attention to the local environment and creation of green spaces as well as more economic opportunities.

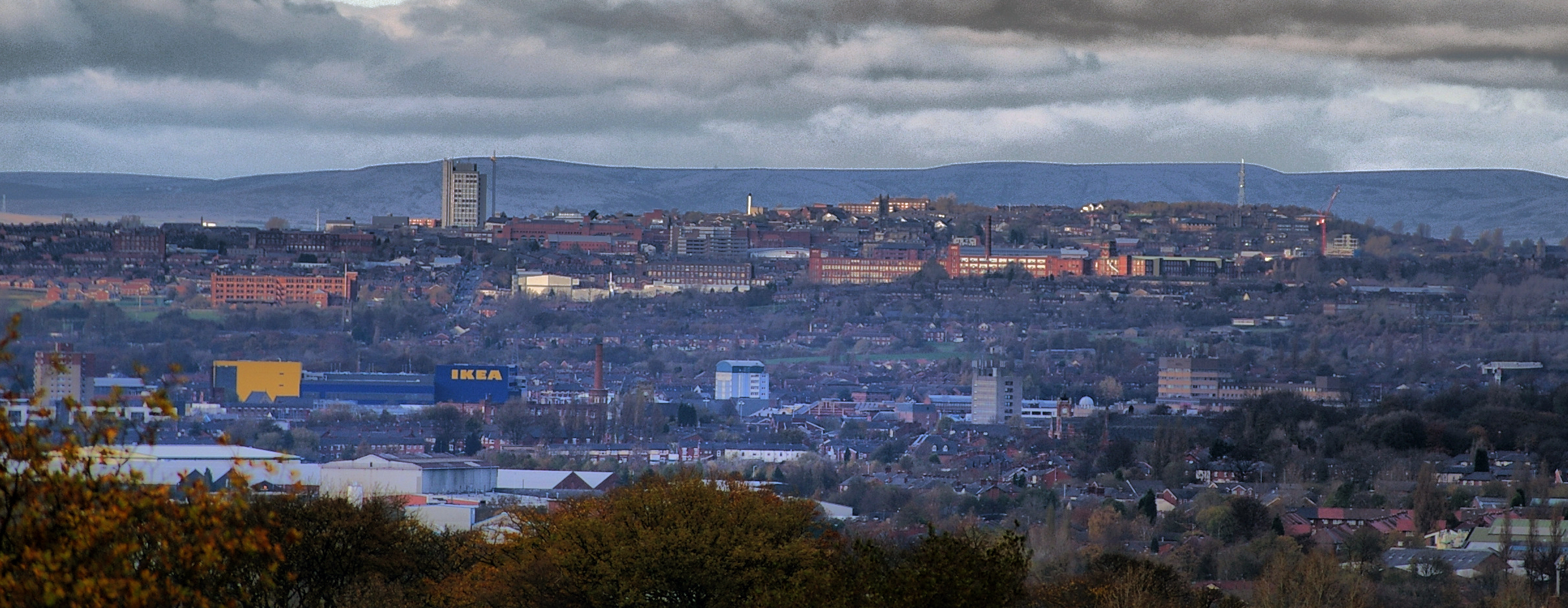
The town in the foreground in 2007; Oldham is behind on the hillside. The chimney visible is that of Cavendish Mill.

In July 2014, deputy prime minister Nick Clegg announced £350 million of investment (£484m in 2025) into Greater Manchester's transport network; this included a new interchange in Ashton-under-Lyne to incorporate the then-separate bus and tram stations and to replace the canopy-style waiting areas with a proper building. At the time, the cost of the work was estimated at £32.7m (£45.2m in 2025). In February 2021, the completed interchange opened fully to the public; the interchange features two Metrolink platforms and 14 bus stops, of which nine surround the central building. In September 2025, it was announced that a new set of walking links would be added to integrate the town's railway station, which lies across the road from the bus and tram interchange.

As well as the regeneration in the 1990s and early 2000s, further regeneration of the town has occurred during the 2020s: in 2024, mayor of Greater Manchester, Andy Burnham, launched the Ashton Mayoral Development Zone (AMDZ), which is primarily focussed on creating economic opportunities in the local area through the improvement of infrastructure and construction of new business units. The programme makes use of funding from the national levelling-up policy of the time and has a greater focus on environmental considerations than the earlier renewal works. The prospectus for the renewal suggests that Ashton's potential for economic growth comes from its connectivity and affordability compared to central Manchester. In August 2025, further details of the regeneration efforts were published by the council, suggesting that it may involve constructing more than 2,000 homes on disused or available land and further areas of commercial opportunities.

== Governance ==
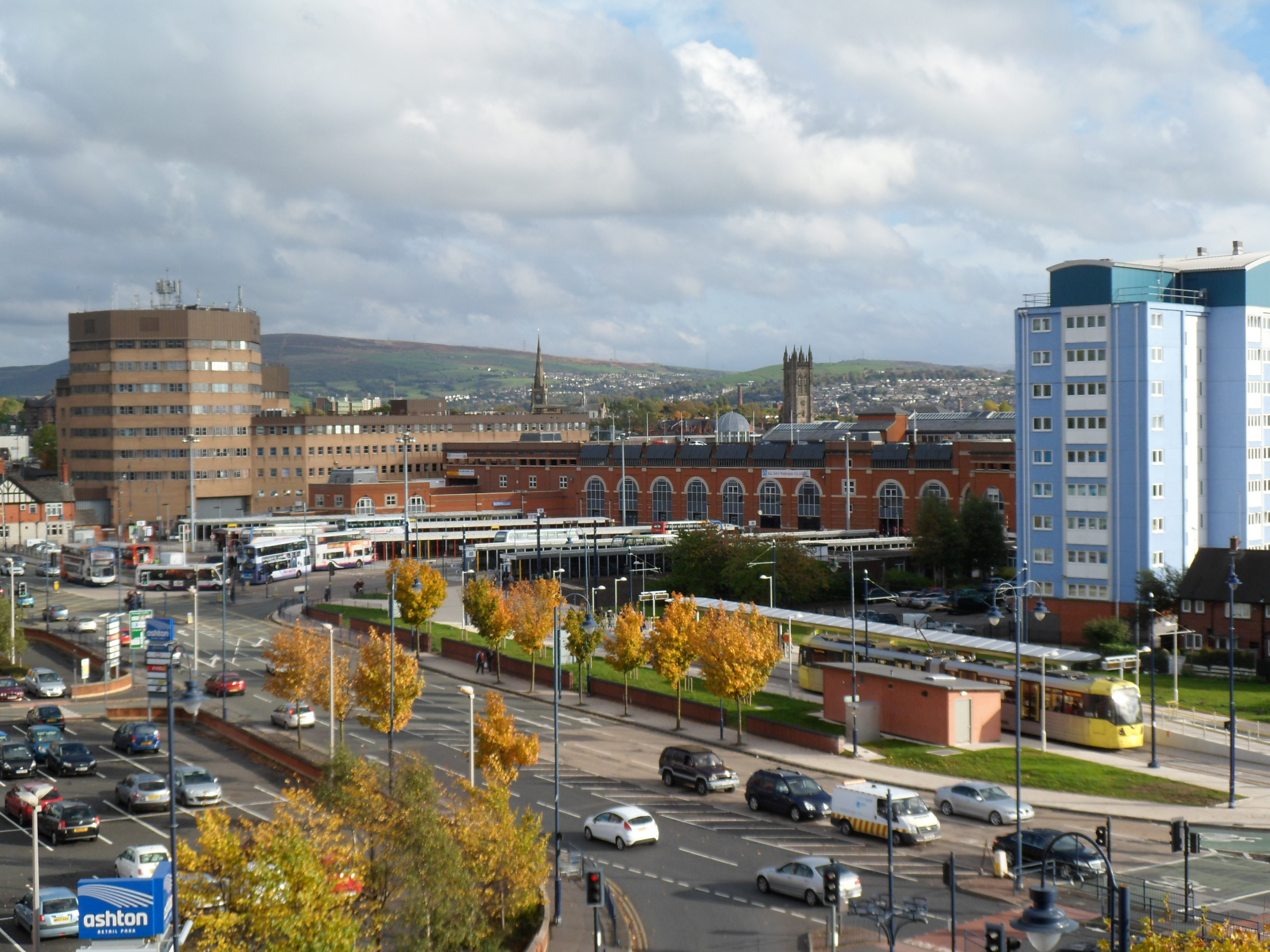
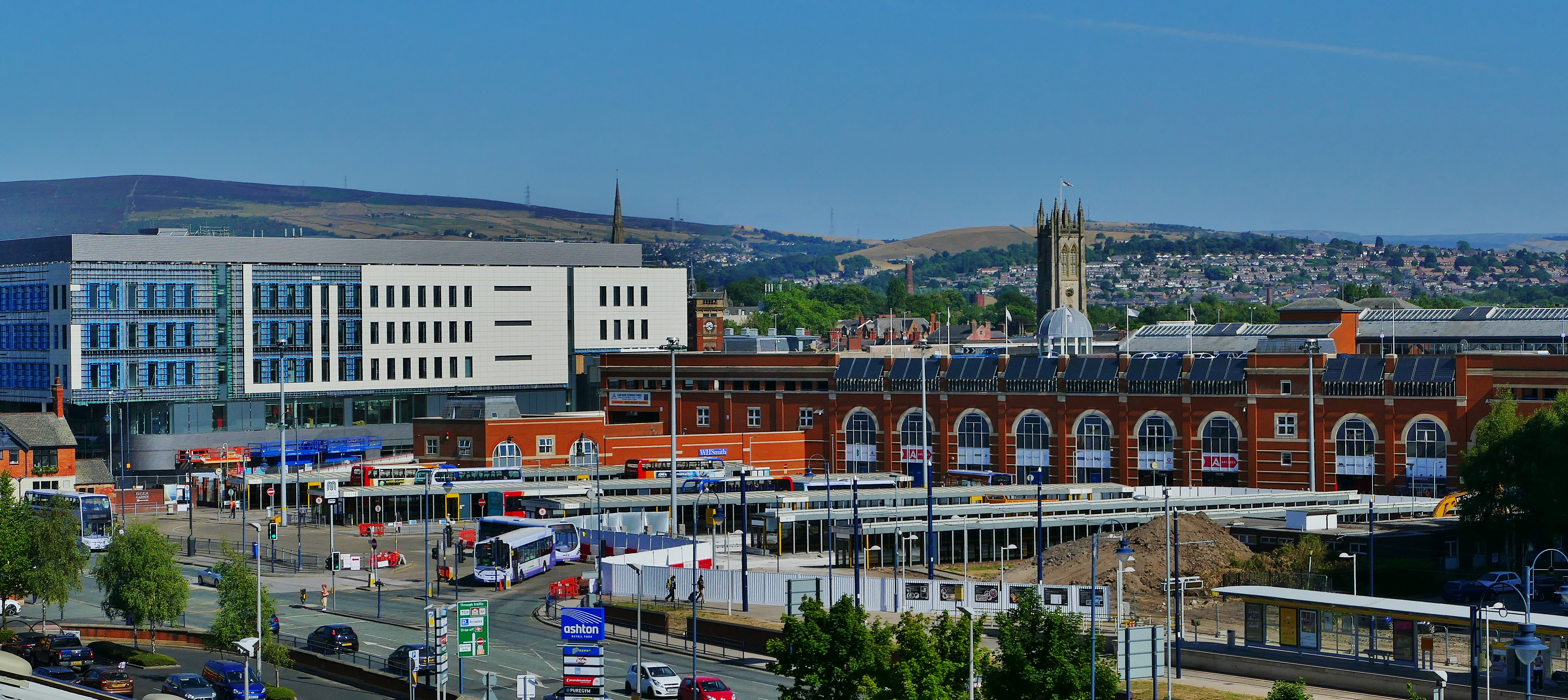
Top: The former Tameside Metropolitan Borough offices, which were demolished in 2016
Bottom: The new council buildings in July 2018

Lying within the historic county boundaries of Lancashire since the early 12th century, Ashton anciently constituted a "single parish-township", but was divided into four divisions (sometimes each styled townships): Ashton Town, Audenshaw, Hartshead and Knott Lanes. Ashton Town was granted a royal charter in 1414, giving it the right to hold a market. All four divisions lay within the Hundred of Salford, an ancient division of the county of Lancashire.

In 1827, police commissioners were established for Ashton Town, tasked with bringing about social and economic improvement. In 1847, the area was incorporated under the Municipal Corporations Act 1835, as a municipal borough with the name "Ashton-under-Lyne", giving it borough status. When the administrative county of Lancashire was created by the Local Government Act 1888, the borough fell under the newly created Lancashire County Council. The borough's boundaries changed during the late 19th century through small exchanges of land with the neighbouring districts of Oldham, Mossley, Dukinfield and Stalybridge. Since 1956, Ashton has been twinned with Chaumont, France.

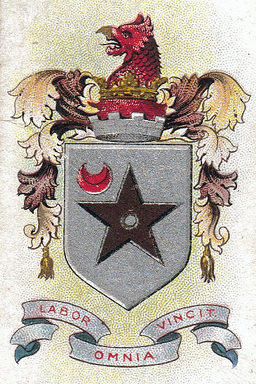
The coat of arms of the former Ashton-under-Lyne Municipal Borough Council

Under the Local Government Act 1972, the town's borough status was abolished and Ashton has, since 1 April 1974, formed part of the Metropolitan Borough of Tameside, itself within the metropolitan county of Greater Manchester. Ashton-under-Lyne is divided into four wards: Ashton Hurst, Ashton St. Michaels, Ashton St Peters and Ashton Waterloo, each of which elect three councillors. Following the 2024 local elections, ten of the seats were held by Labour, one by the Conservatives and one by an independent.

Before the Reform Act 1832, the county of Lancashire was a single county constituency with two seats, despite its population of 1.3 million people at the December 1832 election. The Reform Act split the county into fourteen constituencies, of which Ashton-under-Lyne was one; the boundaries were defined by those described in an 1827 Act of Parliament relating to the town. Between its creation in 1832 and 1859, the seat was held by the Radicals, after which it was held by either Conservative or Liberal MPs until 1928. With the exception of 1931–1935, it has been held continually since by members of the Labour Party. Angela Rayner has been the constituency's Member of Parliament (MP) since 2015; a prominent member of Labour's soft left, she was deputy prime minister in 2024-25.

== Geography ==
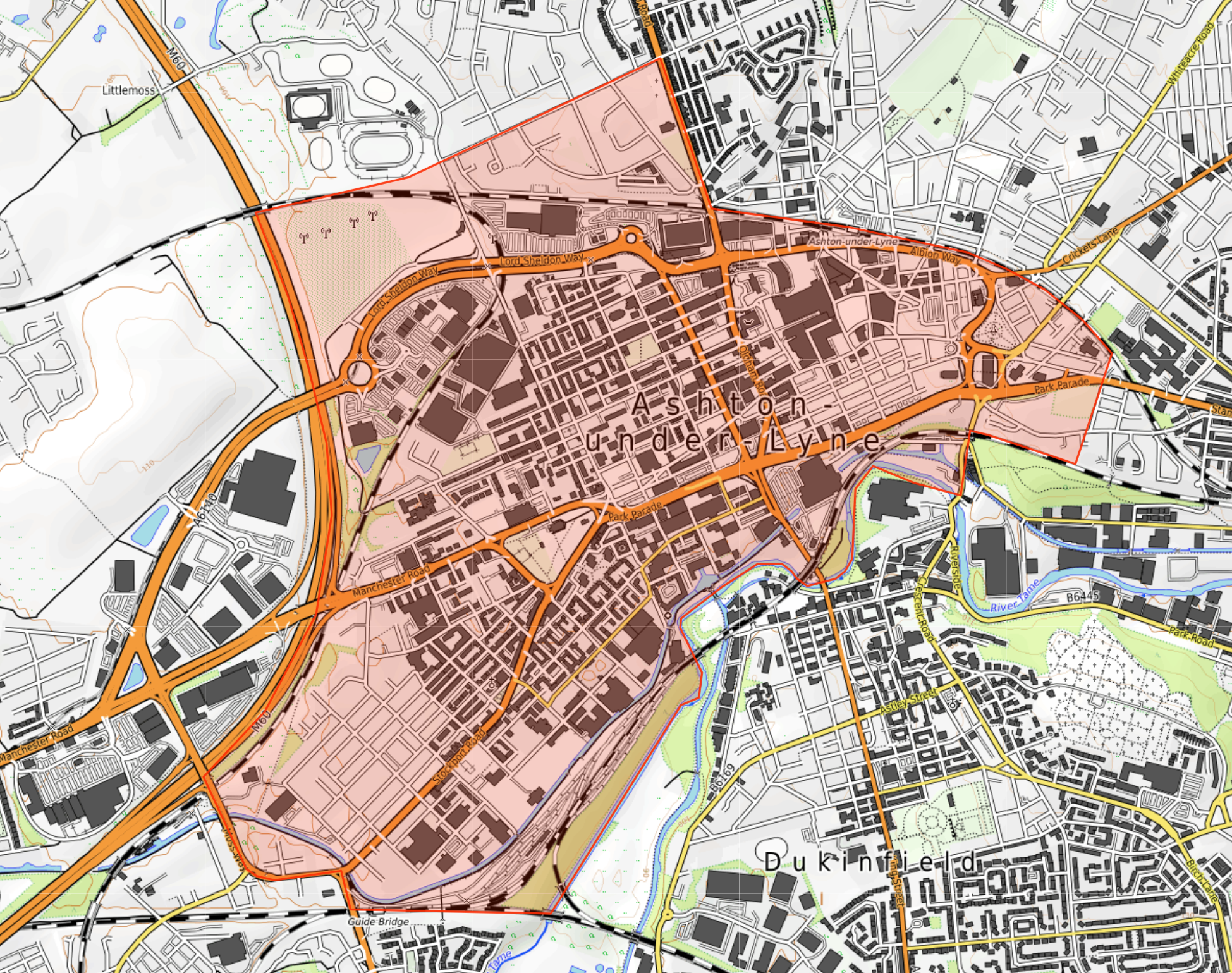
Approximate boundaries of Ashton-under-Lyne based on the St Peter's Ward and the Ashton Regeneration Zone; as Ashton is contiguous with many surrounding towns, precise boundaries are not possible.

Ashton-under-Lyne stands 35 feet (11 m) above of the river Tame, on its north bank. Described in Samuel Lewis's A Topographical Dictionary of England (1848) as situated "on a gentle declivity". The town lies on undulating ground by the Pennines, reaching a maximum elevation of about 1,000 feet (305 m) above sea level. Generally the bedrock of the west of the town consists of coal measures, which were exploited by the coal mining industry, while the east is mainly millstone grit. Overlying the bedrock are deposits of glacial sand and gravel, clay, and some alluvial deposits. Ashton Moss, a peat bog, lies to the west of the town and was originally much larger.

The boundaries of the eponymous constituency include Droyslden, Dukinfield and various other smaller contiguous settlements. However, the town centre is more accurately represented by the St Peter's Ward, which is similar to the borders of the Ashton Renewal Area outlined in the 1996 council report; these are based on the M6 to the west, the railway to the north and the river Tame to the south. The town centre is located 6.2 miles (10.0 km) east of Manchester city centre and is bound on all sides by other towns: Audenshaw, Droylsden, Dukinfield, Mossley, Oldham and Stalybridge, with little or no green space between them. Despite being contiguous with other towns in all directions, the local geography creates the defining boundaries: the Huddersfield Line forms a natural northern and eastern boundary and an administrative boundary between St Peter's and Waterloo; the M60 motorway forms a natural western boundary and administrative boundary with Audenshaw; and the Stockport–Stalybridge line, river Tame and Ashton Canal form a natural southern boundary and an administrative boundary with Dukinfield.

Ashton's built environment is similar to the urban structure of most towns in England, consisting of residential dwellings centred on a market square and high street in the town centre, which is the local centre of commerce. There is a mixture of low-density urban areas, suburbs, semi-rural and rural locations in Ashton-under-Lyne, but overwhelmingly the land use in the town is residential; industrial areas and terraced houses give way to suburbs and rural greenery as the land rises out of the town in the east. The older streets are narrow and irregular, but those built more recently are spacious, lined by "substantial and handsome houses". Areas and suburbs of Ashton-under-Lyne include: Cockbrook, Crowhill, Guide Bridge, Hartshead, Hazelhurst, Hurst, Limehurst, Ryecroft, Taunton and Waterloo.

=== Demographics ===
Ashton compared
2021 UK census / %	Ashton Central	Tameside	England and Wales
White	52.2	85.5	81.7
Asian	37.8	9.2	9.3
Black	5.1	2.3	4.0
Other	4.9	3.0	5.0

The approximate Ashton area is represented by the Ashton Central Middle Layer Super Output Area (MSOA) in the 2021–22 UK census. However, three other MSOAs in the surrounding area are also named for Ashton: Ashton North contains Park Bridge and parts of Limehurst; Ashton East covers part of the area between Ashton and Stalybridge; and Ashton Waterloo contains Taunton, Waterloo, and parts of Daisy Nook and the rest of Limehurst.

The population density of Ashton was 8,360 inhabitants per square mile (3,227/km^{2}), which is an 18.2% increase from the previous census in 2011. Of Ashton's inhabitants, 48.9% are female and 51.1% male, which has remained fairly stable in the last decade. 35.9% of Ashton residents are married or in a civil partnership, a statistic which has not changed significantly since 2011. There has been a shift towards family living, with 44.4% single-person households and 46.8% family households, a change of −1.1% and +0.6% respectively in the last decade.

Of Ashton's residents, 41.4% have a maximum qualification level of 1–3 (secondary school equivalent) and 20.5% have above level 4 (i.e. a university-level equivalent). Of all households, 26.6% own their property (either outright or with debt), 45.6% pay government-subsidised (social) rent and 29.2% either pay private rent or do not pay for their accommodation. Home ownership has seen a decrease of −4.0% since the 2011 census and more people rent property instead. Conversely, 51.2% of residents have access to at least one car, which has increased by 5.4% in the last decade.

67.5% of Ashton residents were born in the UK, which has decreased by 7.0% since 2011. Of those not born in the UK, 48.0% arrived after 2011 and 29.8% between 2001 and 2010. As shown in the table above, 52.2% of residents identified as White (−13.1% since 2011), 37.8% as Asian (+7.7%) and 5.1% as Black (+2.8%). Data for specific countries is only available for Tameside as a whole, where 1.8% of residents were born in Pakistan, 1.6% in Bangladesh and 0.6% in India; no other Middle Eastern and Asian countries made up more than 0.2% of the population. The Indices of Multiple Deprivation for the town's households show 34.8% are deprived in one dimension, 23.8% in two and 11.4% in three or more, leaving 10% not deprived in any dimension.

In 1931, 10% of Ashton's population was middle class compared with 14% in England and Wales; by 1971, this had increased steadily to 17% compared with 24% nationally. In the same time frame, there was a decline in the working-class population. In 1931, 34% were working class compared with 36% in England and Wales; by 1971, this had decreased to 29% in Ashton and 26% nationwide. The rest of the population was made up of clerical workers and skilled manual workers.

=== Population change ===
In 1700, the population of Ashton, the Tame Valley's main urban area, was an estimated 550. The town's 18th-century growth was fuelled by an influx of people from the countryside attracted by the prospect of work in its new industries, mirroring the rest of the region. In the early 19th century, Irish immigrants escaping from the Great Irish Famine were also drawn to the area by the new jobs created. The availability of jobs created by the growth of the textile industry in the town led to Ashton's population increasing by more than 400% between 1801 and 1861, from 6,500 to 34,886. The population dropped by 9% during the 1860s as a consequence of the cotton famine caused by the American Civil War. The population peaked in 1961 before beginning to fall until 2001; although the population has begun to increase again, it has still not returned to that of 1961.

The table and graph below details the population change since 1851, including the percentage change per annum.

Population growth in Ashton-under-Lyne since 1851
Year	1700	1775	1801	1851	1861	1871	1881	1891	1901	1911	1921	1931	1939	1951	1961	1971	1991	2001	2011	2021
Population	550	2,859	6,500	29,790	34,886	31,984	36,399	40,486	43,890	45,172	43,335	51,573	46,534	46,794	50,154	48,974	44,385	42,236	45,198	48,604
% change / year	—	+5.60	+17.18	+1.81	+1.71	−0.83	+1.38	+1.12	+0.84	+0.29	−0.41	+1.90	−1.22	+0.05	+0.72	−0.24	−0.47	−0.48	+0.70	+0.75
Sources: — %change/year is calculated as an average between two data points.

View source data.

== Religion ==
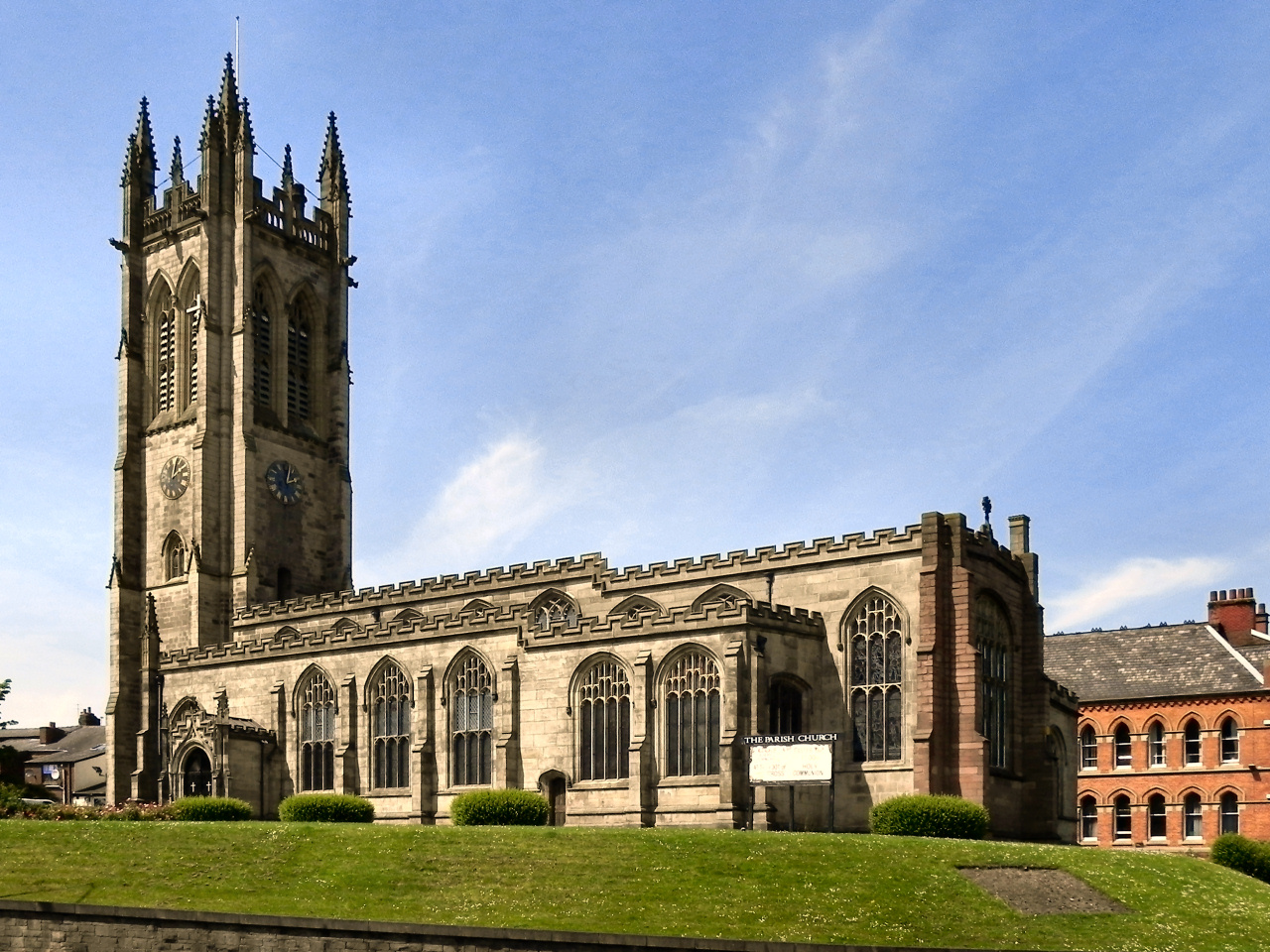
St Michael and All Angels' Church is a Grade I listed building

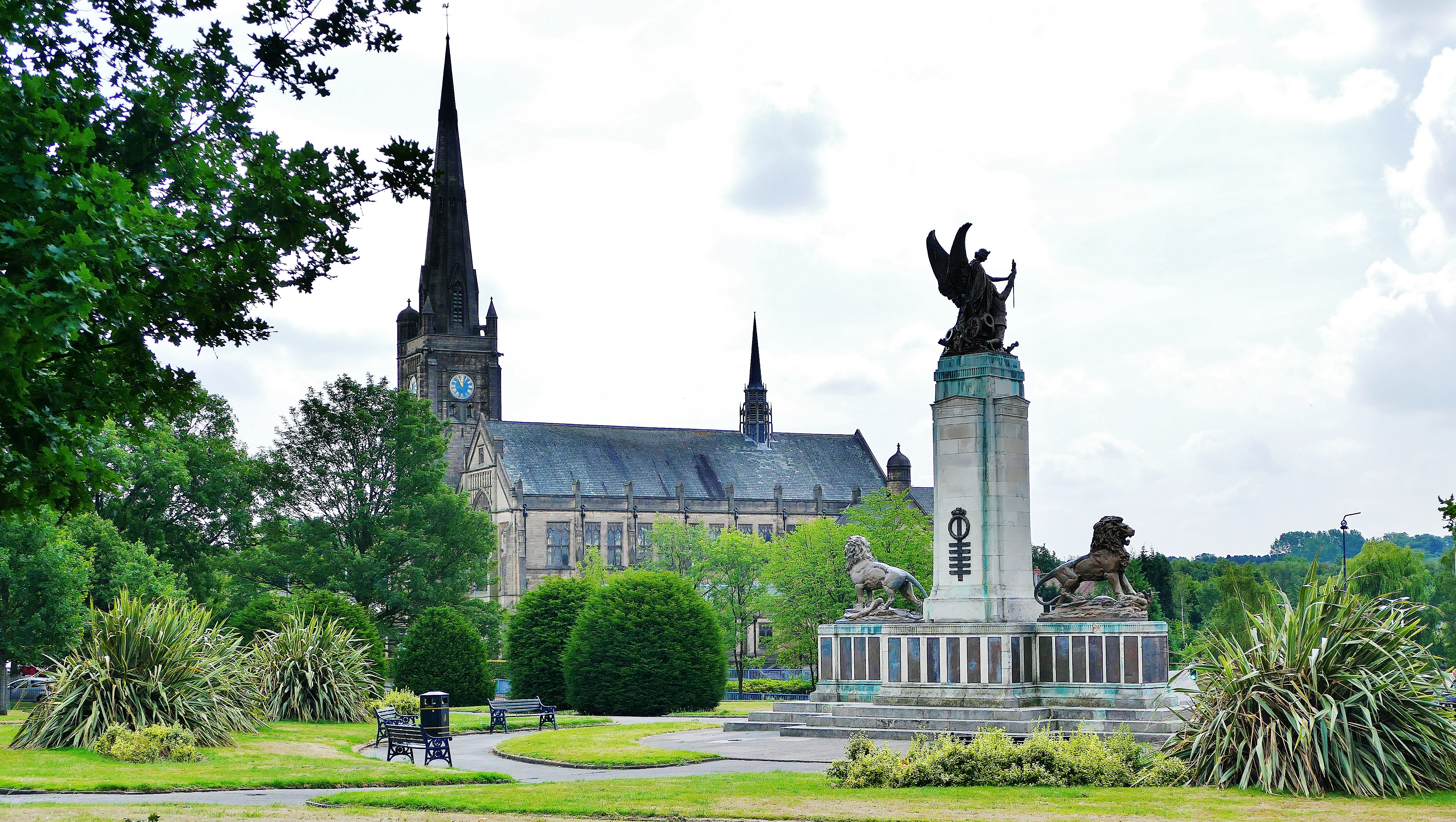
Albion Church, photographed from the War Memorial in 2018

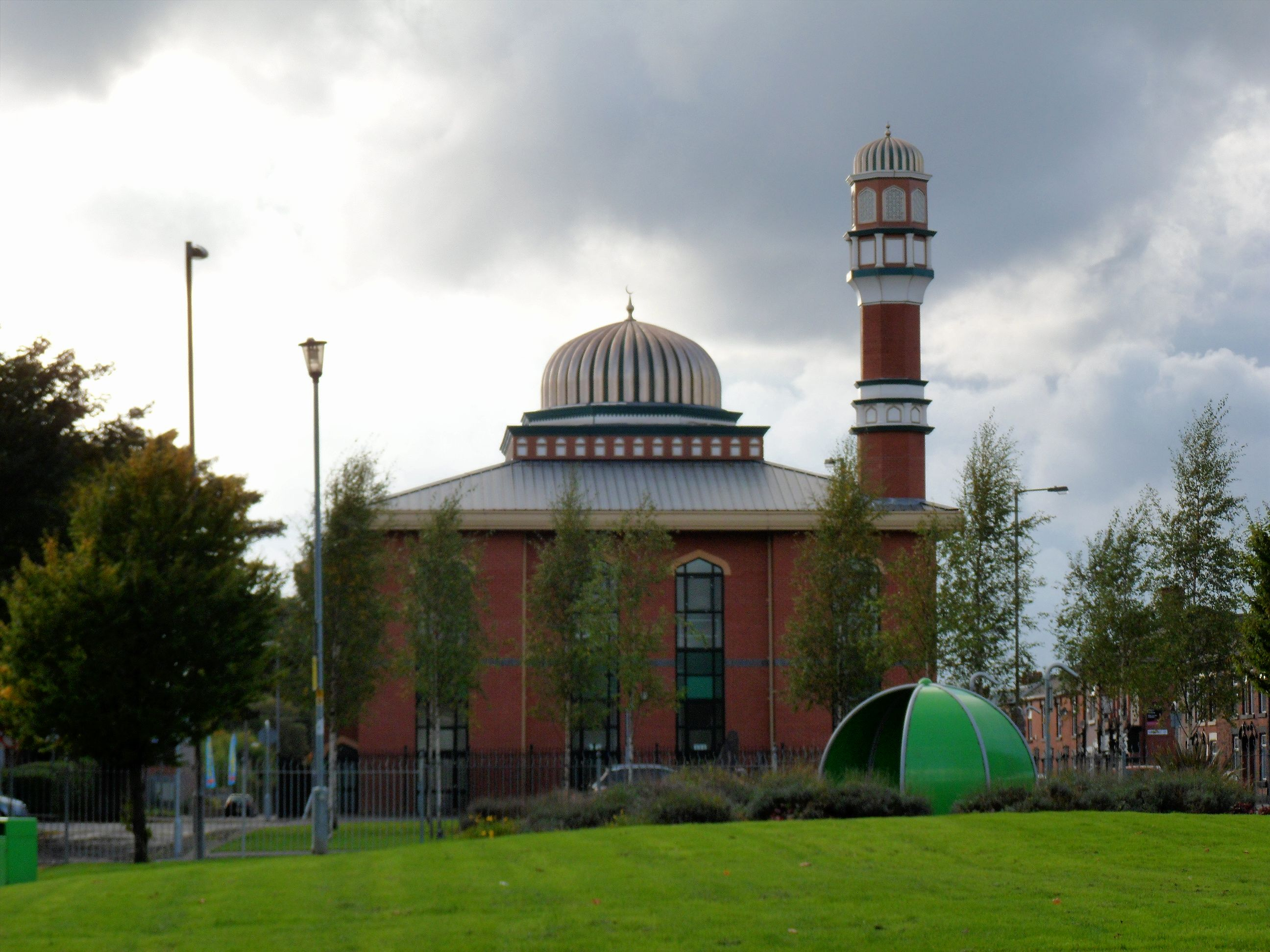
Masjid Hamza Mosque

St Michael and All Angels' Church is a Grade I listed building that dates back to at least 1262, although it was rebuilt in the 15th, 16th and 19th centuries. In 1795, it was the only church in the town and one of only two in Tameside. There was a great increase in the number of chapels and religious buildings in the area during the 19th century; by the end of the century, there were 44 Anglican churches and 138 chapels belonging to other denominations. The most common denominations amongst the chapels were Catholic, Congregationalist and Methodist.

The 19th-century evangelist John Wroe attempted to turn Ashton-under-Lyne into a "new Jerusalem". He founded the Christian Israelite Church and, from 1822 to 1831, the town was the religion's headquarters. Wroe intended to build a wall around the town with four gateways and although the wall was never constructed, the four gatehouses were. Popular opinion in the town turned against Wroe when he was accused of indecent behaviour in 1831, but the charges were dismissed. The Church spread to Australia, where it is still active.

In the 2021 census, 36.0% of Ashton residents were Muslim, 28.8% of were Christian, 26.9% had no religion and 2.5% were Hindu. Across Tameside, these proportions were very different: 47.8% were Christian, 38.0% had no religion, 7.3% were Muslim and 1.3% were Hindu. The proportion of Christian residents (46.2%) in England and Wales is much higher than Ashton, but slightly lower than Tameside; the population of Muslim residents (6.5%) and Hindu residents (1.7%) in England and Wales is much lower than Ashton and around the same as across Tameside. Mosques in the town include Ashton Central in Penny Meadow and Masjid Hamza in West End.

== Economy ==
Economic statistics
2021–22 UK census	Ashton Central	Tameside	England & Wales
Working age population	64.7%	62.6%	62.9%
Employed (including full-time students)	47.9%	57.1%	57.2%
Unemployed (including full-time students)	6.2%	3.5%	3.4%
All inactive	46.0%	39.5%	39.4%
Inactive (retired)	12.7%	21.4%	21.6%

In the 2021 census, the proportion of Ashton Central residents at working age (16–64) was 64.7%, higher than the surrounding area and the national average. However, the employment rate of 47.9% was almost 10% lower than the rest of Tameside and the national average, and the unemployment rate was almost double, at 6.2% compared to 3.5% in Tameside and 3.4% in the rest of the UK.

Despite the economic activity rate being higher than the national average at 46.0%, a lesser proportion of the population is in retirement, at only 12.7% compared to the national average of 21.6%. Indeed, the area also has a low proportion of workers in "professional occupations" (10.4% compared to 15.1% across Tameside) and a much higher proportion of workers in so-called "elementary professions":17.8% compared to 10.6% across Tameside. Of the 99 industries listed by the census, the only ones that employed more than 5% of Ashton Central's population were specialised construction or civil engineering, retail trade, food and beverage services, and human health services.

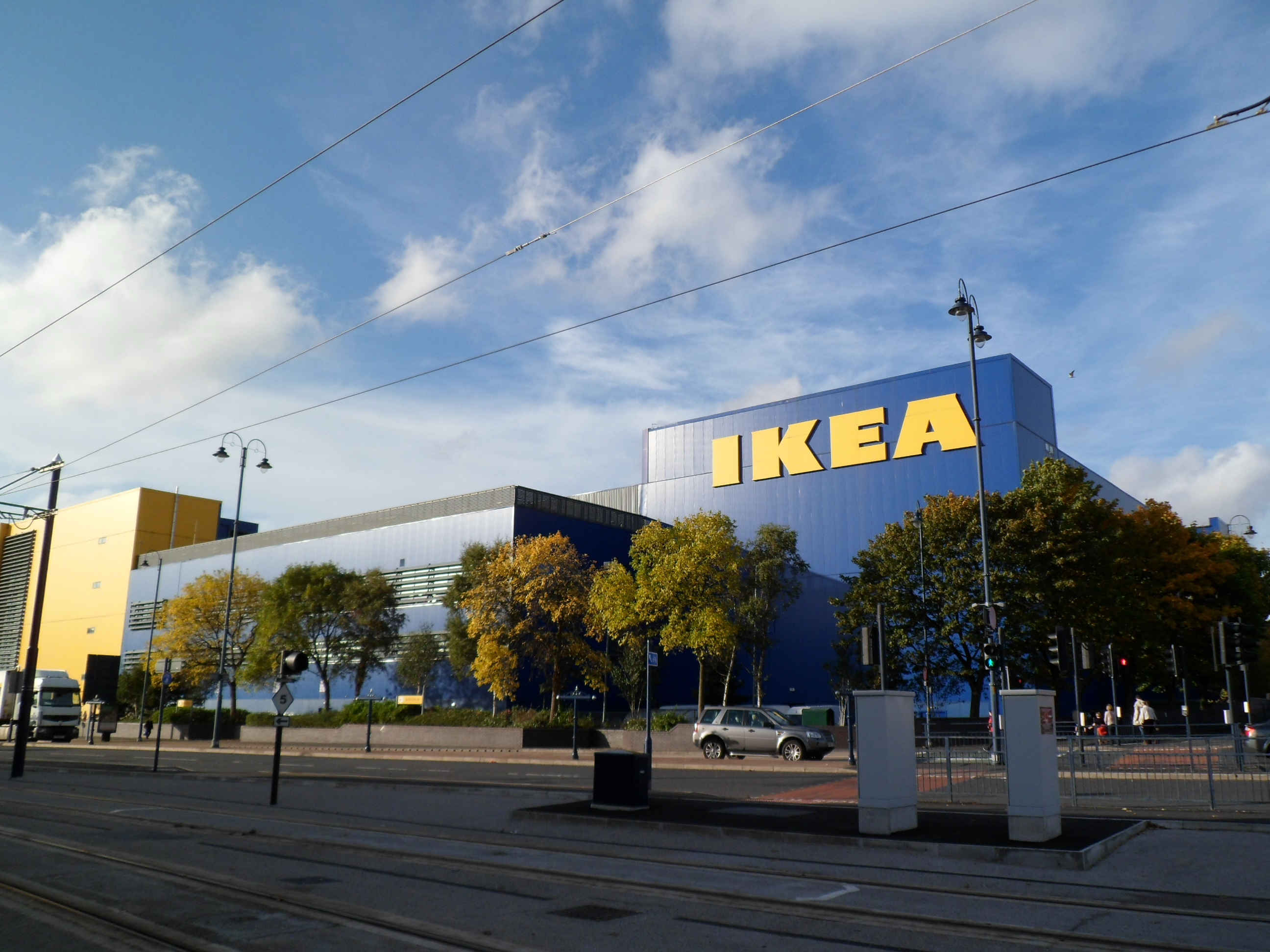
IKEA's store was their first in a town centre, which opened in 2006.

The Ashton Arcades shopping centre opened in October 1995 and, in February 2007, permission was granted for a £40 million upgrade and extension; this had still not happened by 2013 due to the 2008 financial crisis. In 2006, after failing twice to gain permission, IKEA announced plans to build its first town-centre store in Ashton-under-Lyne. The store was expected to create 500 new jobs and to attract other businesses to the area. The store opened on 19 October 2006 and covers 296,000 square feet (27,500 m^{2}). At the time of its creation, the store was the tallest in Britain. The St Petersfield area of Ashton underwent a £42 million redevelopment and provided 2,000 jobs. The aim of the investment was to create a business district in the town and bring life to a neglected area of Ashton. The development provided 280,000 square feet (26,000 m^{2}) of office space and 400,000 square feet (37,000 m^{2}) of retail and leisure space. Pennine Care NHS Trust relocated its headquarters to the St Petersfield area in 2006. Until then a popular nightspot, in 2002 several night clubs were brought to the brink of closure after a downturn in trade caused by four murders in three months.

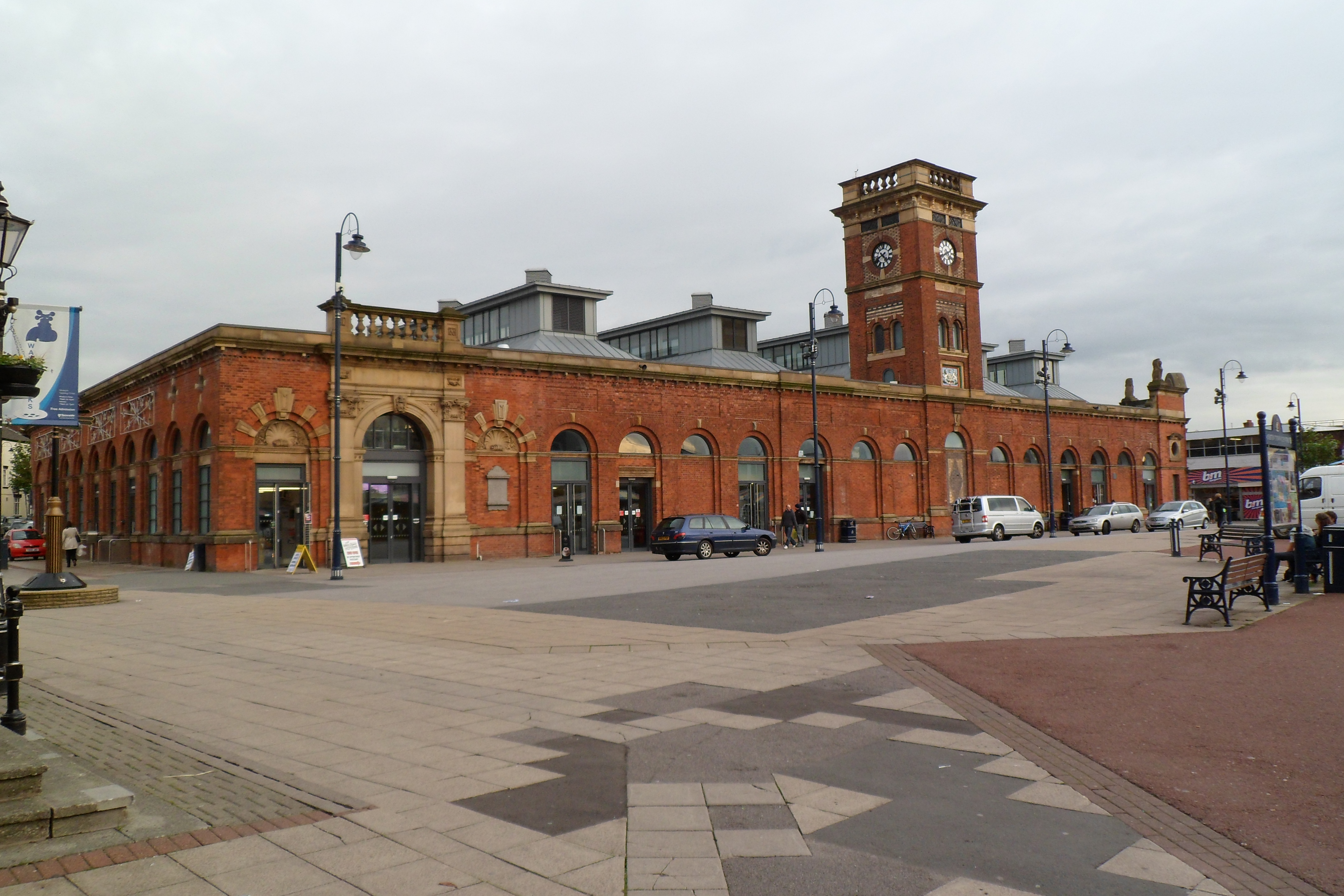
Ashton Market Hall in October 2011

As well as being populated by leading high-street names, Ashton has an outdoor market which was established in the medieval period. It is made up of about 180 stalls and is open six days a week. The farmers' market, with over 70 stalls is the largest in the region, as is the weekday flea market. In 2004, a fire at the Grade II listed Ashton Market Hall severely damaged the building; it reopened in 2008 after a £16m renovation project, equivalent to £26m in 2025, with additional business units integrated inside. The market was later determined the best in the country in 2014 by the National Association of British Market Authorities.

== Transport ==
=== Railway ===
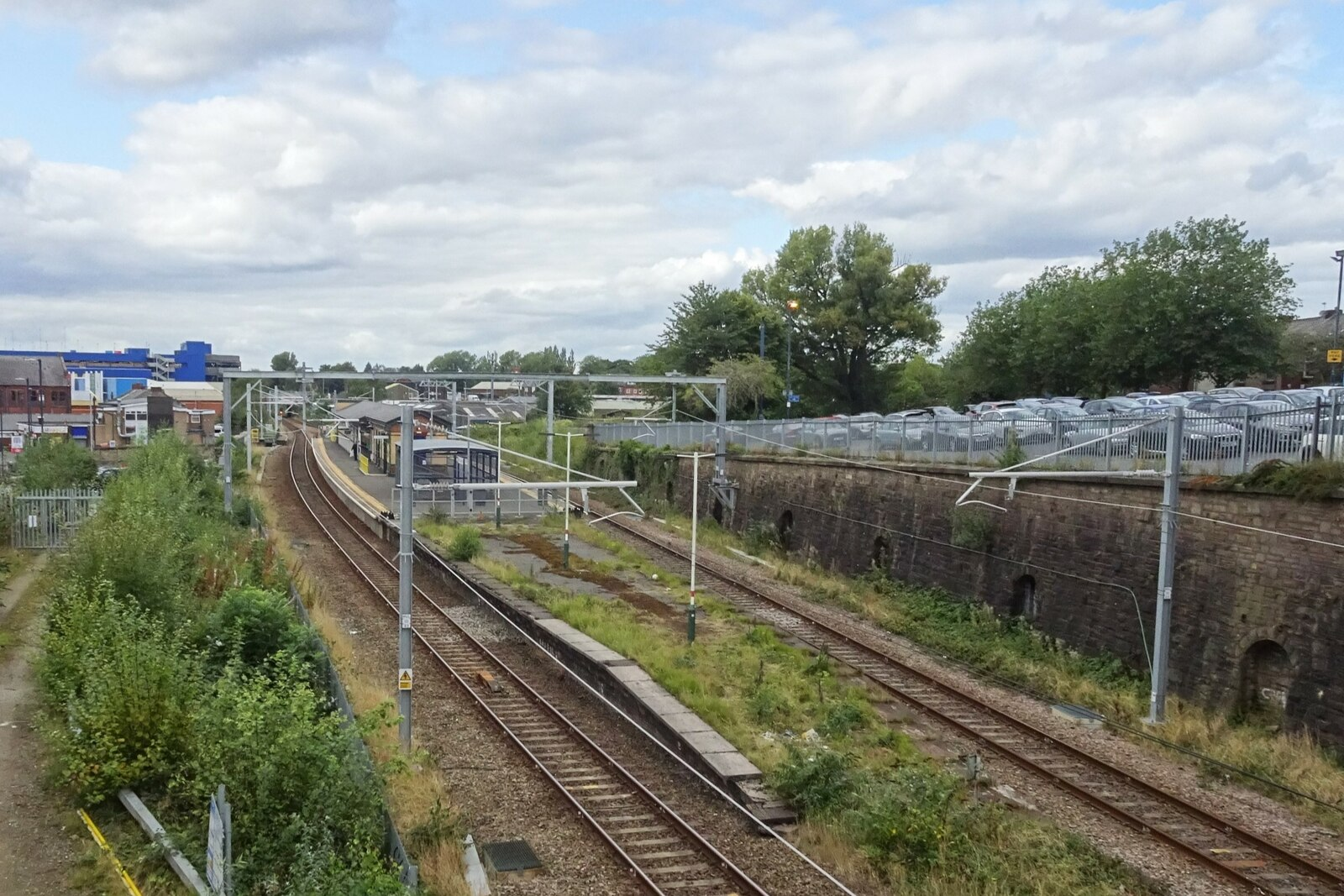
Ashton-under-Lyne station, 2024

Ashton-under-Lyne lies on the Huddersfield Line; Northern Trains operates a generally hourly service between Stalybridge and Southport, via Manchester Victoria and Wigan Wallgate.

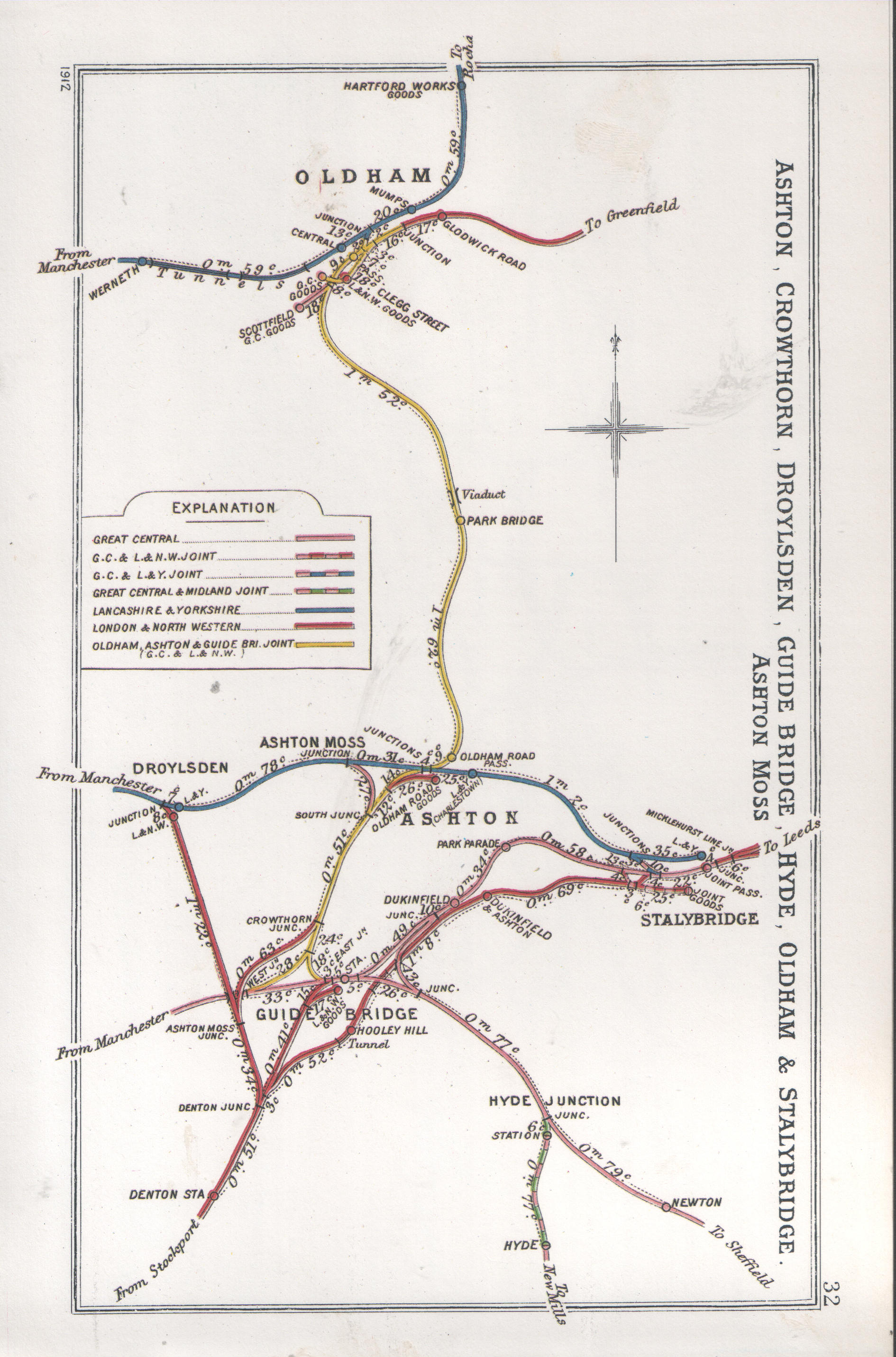
A 1912 Railway Clearing House map of the Ashton area

The Ashton area has seen five stations in its history:

- Ashton-under-Lyne station was opened as Ashton on 13 April 1846, sited between Droylsden and Stalybridge on the Lancashire and Yorkshire Railway. It was renamed Ashton (Charlestown) in 1874, before being renamed again to Ashton-under-Lyne by British Rail in 1968. It is now the only station in Ashton
- Ashton Park Parade was situated on the Great Central line between Ardwick, Chorlton-cum-Hardy and Stalybridge; it was closed on 5 November 1956
- Ashton Moss and Oldham Road opened on 26 August 1861; they closed in 1862 and 1959 respectively
- Dukinfield and Ashton was a stop on a branch of the London and North Western Railway main line between Crewe and Manchester; it opened in 1893 and closed in 1950, with the line itself later closing completely in 1968.

=== Trams ===
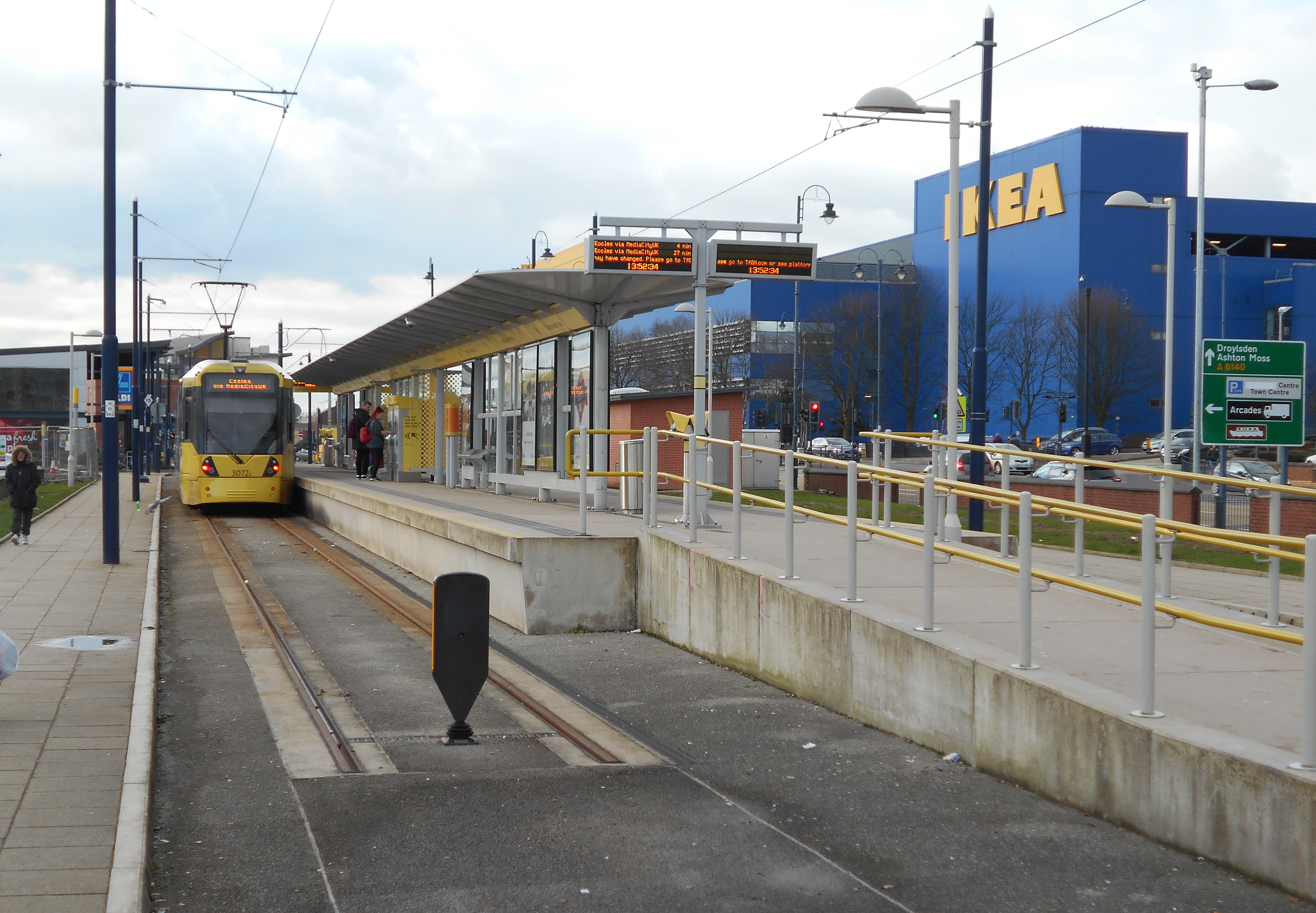
Ashton-under-Lyne tram stop

After a 75-year absence, trams returned to Ashton in October 2013, when the Manchester Metrolink tram system's East Manchester Line was extended to the town. Ashton-under-Lyne tram stop in the town centre stands alongside the bus station and is the eastern terminus for the East Manchester Line to Manchester Piccadilly and the city centre. Ashton West and Ashton Moss also serve the area on the same line.

In 1881, a tramway with horse-drawn tramcars was opened between Stalybridge and Audenshaw, through Ashton-under-Lyne. The first tramway of its kind in Tameside, it was later extended to Manchester. The Oldham, Ashton and Hyde and District Tramway Company, founded in 1897, operated 8 mi (13 km) of tram lines with electric tramcars. It was the first line around Manchester to use electricity. A line from Stalybridge to Ashton-under-Lyne was opened in 1903 and operated by the Stalybridge, Hyde, Mossley & Dukinfield Tramways & Electricity Board. The first bus service from Ashton-under-Lyne ran in 1923 and the 1920s saw a period of decline for the tramways as they suffered from the competition with buses. The last of the first generation of electric tram services in the town ran in 1938. A trolleybus system operated in the town from 1925 to 1966.

=== Buses ===
Bus services are operated primarily by Metroline Manchester and Go North West, along with Stagecoach Manchester and Diamond Bus North West. Routes link the town with Dukinfield, Glossop, Hyde, Manchester Piccadilly Gardens, Stalybridge and Stockport.

=== Roads ===
The M60 Manchester orbital motorway runs through the western part of Ashton-under-Lyne; junction 23 serves the A635, the main road through the centre of the town.

In 1732, an Act of Parliament was passed which permitted the construction of a turnpike from Manchester, then in Lancashire, to Salters Brook in Cheshire. The road passed through the town, as well as Audenshaw, Mottram-in-Longdendale and Stalybridge. A turnpike trust was responsible for collecting tolls from traffic; the proceeds were used for road maintenance. The trust for Manchester to Salters Brook was one of over 400 established between 1706 and 1750, a period in which turnpikes became popular. It was the first turnpike to be opened in Tameside, and driven by economic growth, more turnpikes were opened in the area in the late 18th and early 19th centuries. Acts of Parliaments were passed in 1765, 1793 and 1799, permitting the construction of turnpikes from Ashton to Doctor Lane Head in Saddleworth, Standedge in Saddleworth, and Oldham respectively. Towards the end of the 19th century, many turnpike trusts were wound up as they were superseded by local government; the last in Tameside to close was the Ashton-under-Lyne to Salters Brook road in 1884.

=== Canals ===
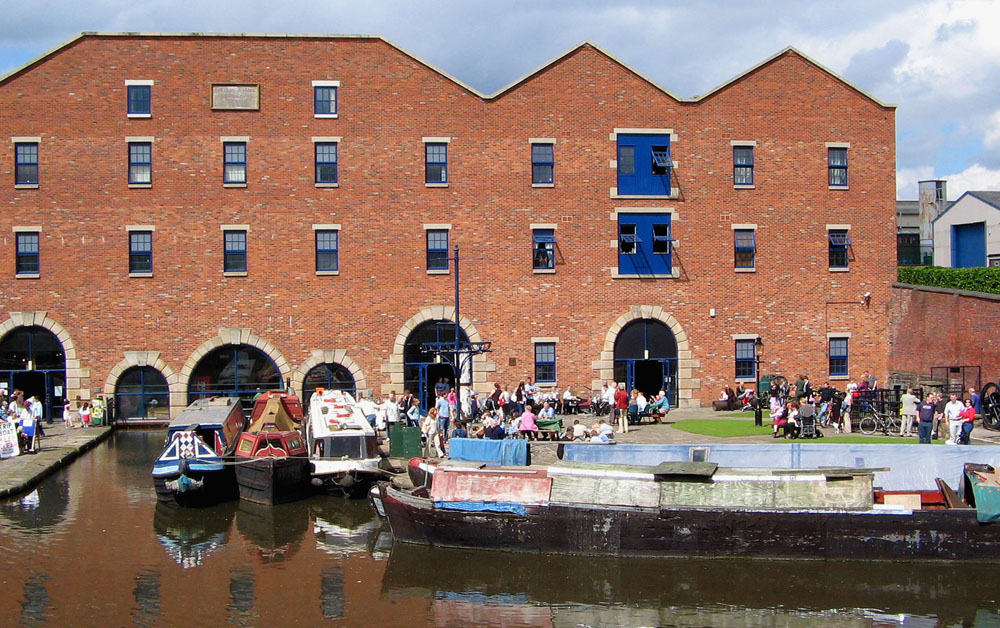
The Portland Basin warehouse is now a museum

The town became the focus of three canals, which were constructed in Tameside in the 1790s as it was an important centre of coal mining in the Lancashire coalfield. The 1790s has been characterised as a period of mania for canal building in England. The first of the three to be built was the Ashton Canal, which was constructed between 1792 and 1797. Connecting Manchester to Ashton-under-Lyne, with a branch to Oldham, it cost about £170,000 (equivalent to £17 million in 2025).

The Peak Forest Canal was constructed from 1794 to 1805, and was originally planned as a branch of the Ashton Canal. It connected the Portland Basin with the Peak District and cost £177,000 (£13 million as of 2025). The Huddersfield Narrow Canal was built between 1794 and 1811, to enable cross-Pennine trade between Manchester and Kingston upon Hull; the cost of construction was £400,000.

The advent of the railways in the 19th century signalled the decline of the canal system. The new railways were quicker and more economical than the canals, and the waterways declined. The Huddersfield Narrow Canal was bought by the Huddersfield and Manchester Railway in 1844. Along with the Ashton and Peak Forest canals, the Huddersfield Narrow Canal was later bought by the Sheffield, Ashton-under-Lyne and Manchester Railway Company. The canals remained in use throughout the 19th century on a smaller scale than in their heyday but, by the mid-20th century, all commercial traffic had ceased. A restoration programmes began in the 1980s, by which point the canal had been derelict for 40 years. Major blockages had been created by parts of the canal, such as through Stalybridge, being infilled, which was the last major barrier to complete reopening by 1996. The full canal was reopened as a navigable waterway in 2001.

== Public services ==
In the early 19th century, Ashton-under-Lyne's growth made it necessary to find a new water supply. Before the introduction of piped water the town's inhabitants drew water from wells and the nearby River Tame. Industrial processes had, however, polluted the river and the wells could not sustain a rapidly expanding population. From 1825, a private company was responsible for piping water from reservoirs, but there were still many homes without proper drainage or water supply.

Service providers for Ashton today include:

- Greater Manchester Waste Disposal Authority co-ordinates waste management, via the local authority.
- Electricity North West is Ashton's distribution network operator for electricity. The first power station in Tameside was built in 1899, providing electricity for the area.
- United Utilities manages the drinking and waste water.
- Greater Manchester Police provide policing; the force's Tameside division have their divisional headquarters for policing Tameside in the town.
- Greater Manchester Fire and Rescue Service operates the statutory emergency fire and rescue service, which has one station on Slate Lane.
- Tameside General Hospital is a large NHS hospital on the outskirts of the town, administered by Tameside & Glossop Integrated Care NHS Foundation Trust.
- North West Ambulance Service provides emergency patient transport.

== Landmarks ==
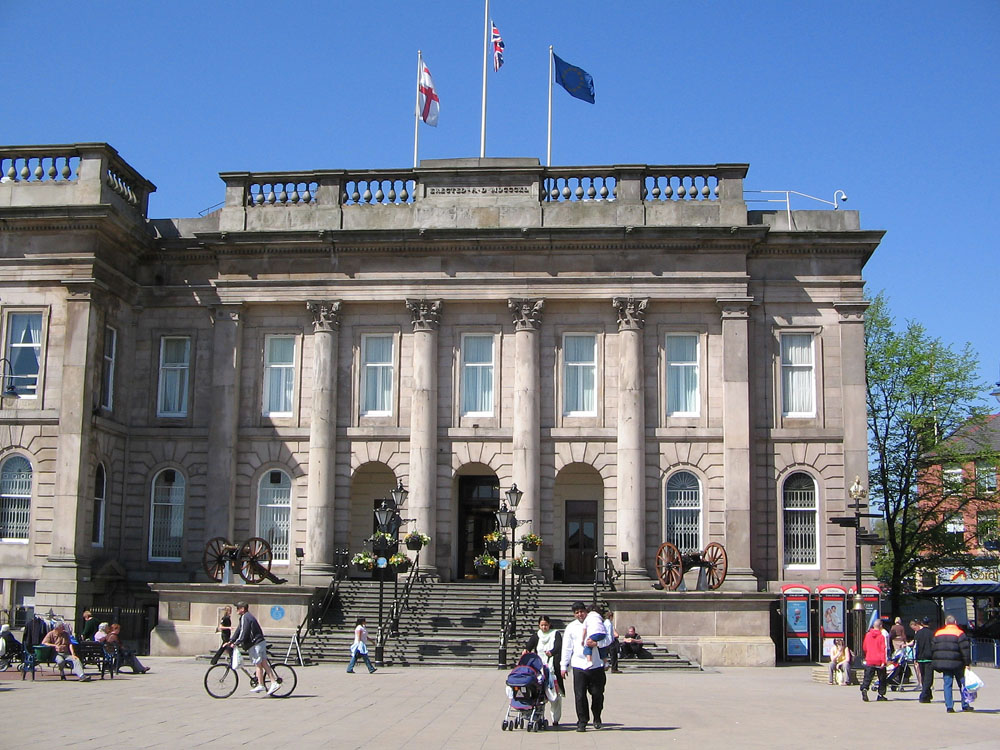
The Corinthian columns on the facade of the town hall

After the Ashton Canal closed in the 1960s, it was decided to turn the Portland Basin warehouse into a museum. In 1985, the first part of the Heritage Centre and Museum opened on the first floor of the warehouse. The restoration of the building was complete in 1999; the museum details Tameside's social, industrial and political history. The basin next to the warehouse is the point at which the Ashton, Huddersfield Narrow and the Peak Forest canals meet. It has been used several times as a filming location for Coronation Street, including a scene where the character Richard Hillman drove into the canal.

The earliest parts of Ashton Town Hall, which was the first purpose-built town hall in what is now Tameside, date to 1840 when it was opened. It has classical features such as the Corinthian columns on the entrance façade. Enlarged in 1878, the hall provides areas for administrative purposes and public functions. The Old Street drill hall was completed in 1887.

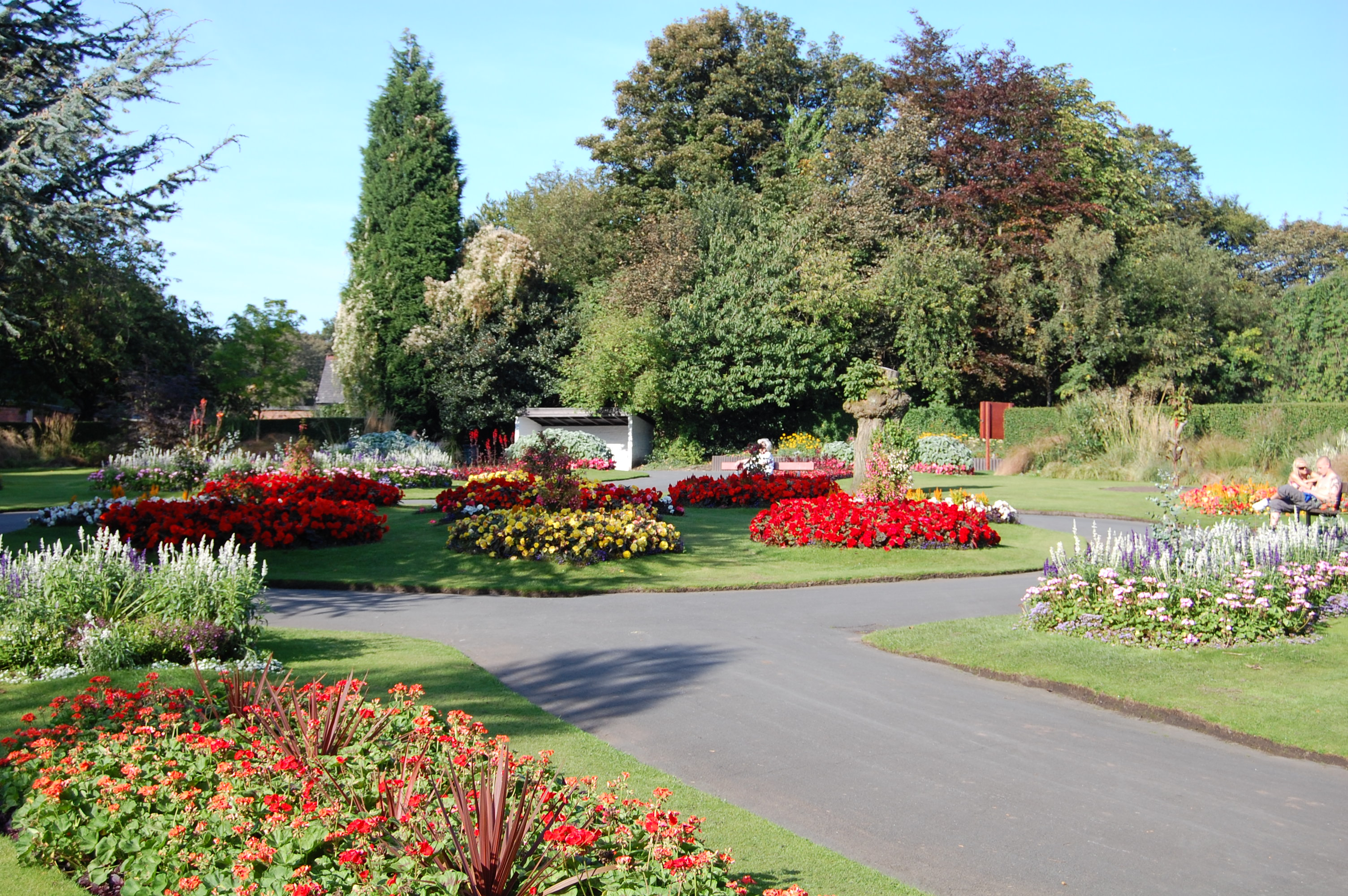
Over 60,000 people turned out to the opening of Stamford Park in 1873; it had taken 17 years of campaigning and fundraising by local cotton workers.

There are five parks in the town, three of which have Green Flag Awards. The first park opened in Ashton-under-Lyne was Stamford Park on the border with Stalybridge. The park opened in 1873, after a 17-year campaign by local cotton workers; the land was bought from a local mill-owner for £15,000 (£1.6 million as of 2025) and further land was donated by George Grey, 7th Earl of Stamford. A crowd of between 60,000 and 80,000 turned out to see the Earl of Stamford formally open the new facility on 12 July 1873. It now includes a boating lake and a memorial to Joseph Rayner Stephens, commissioned by local factory workers to commemorate his work promoting fair wages and improved working conditions. A conservatory was opened in 1907 and Coronation gates were installed at both the Ashton-under-Lyne and Stalybridge entrances in 1953.

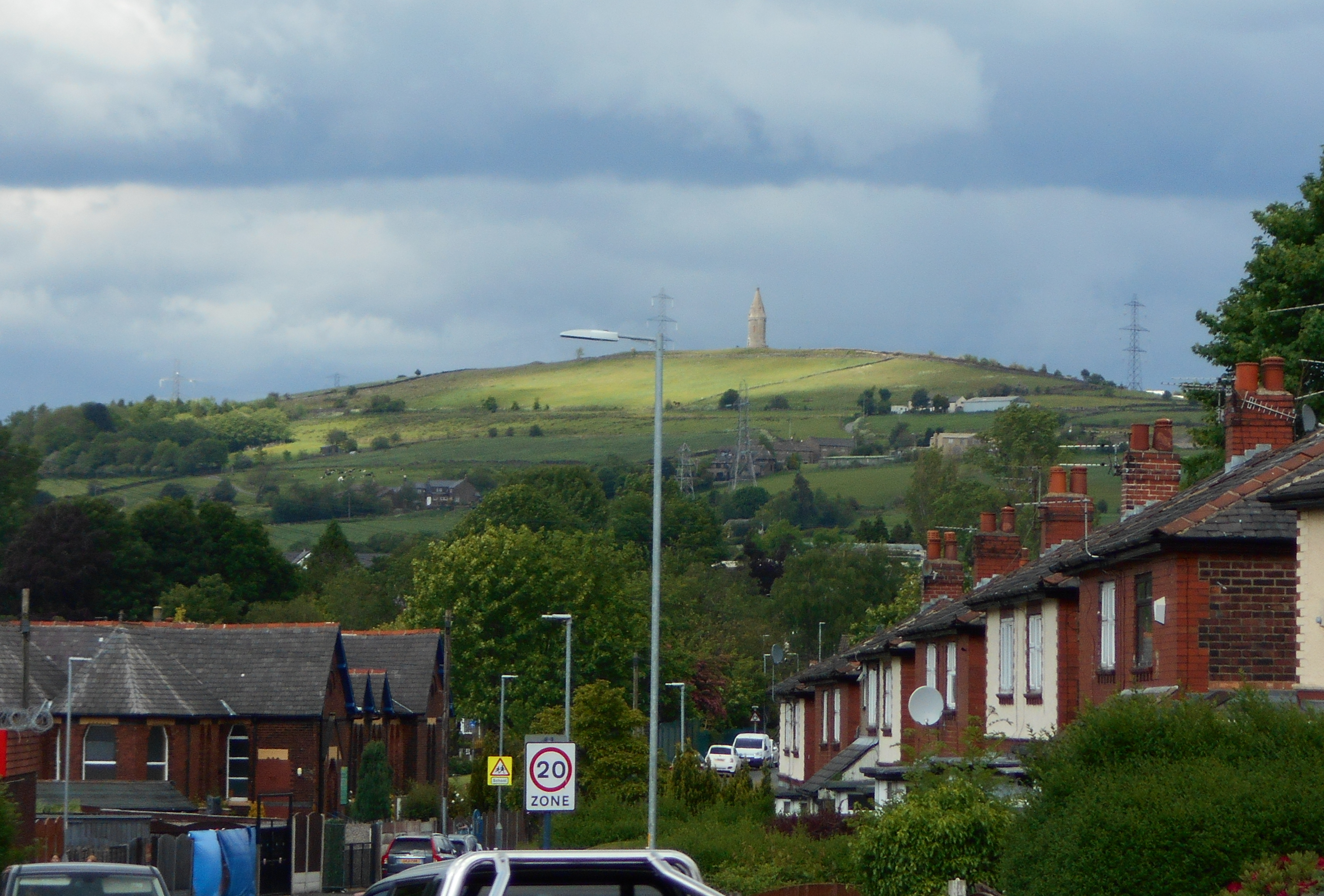
Hartshead Pike, seen from Ashton

Hartshead Pike is a stone tower on top of Hartshead Hill overlooking Ashton and Oldham. The existing building was constructed in 1863 but there has been a building on the site since at least the mid-18th century, although the original purpose is obscure. The pike might have been the site of a beacon in the late 16th century. It has a visitor centre and, from the top of the hill, it is possible to see the Jodrell Bank Observatory in Cheshire, the Welsh hills and the Holme Moss transmitter in West Yorkshire.

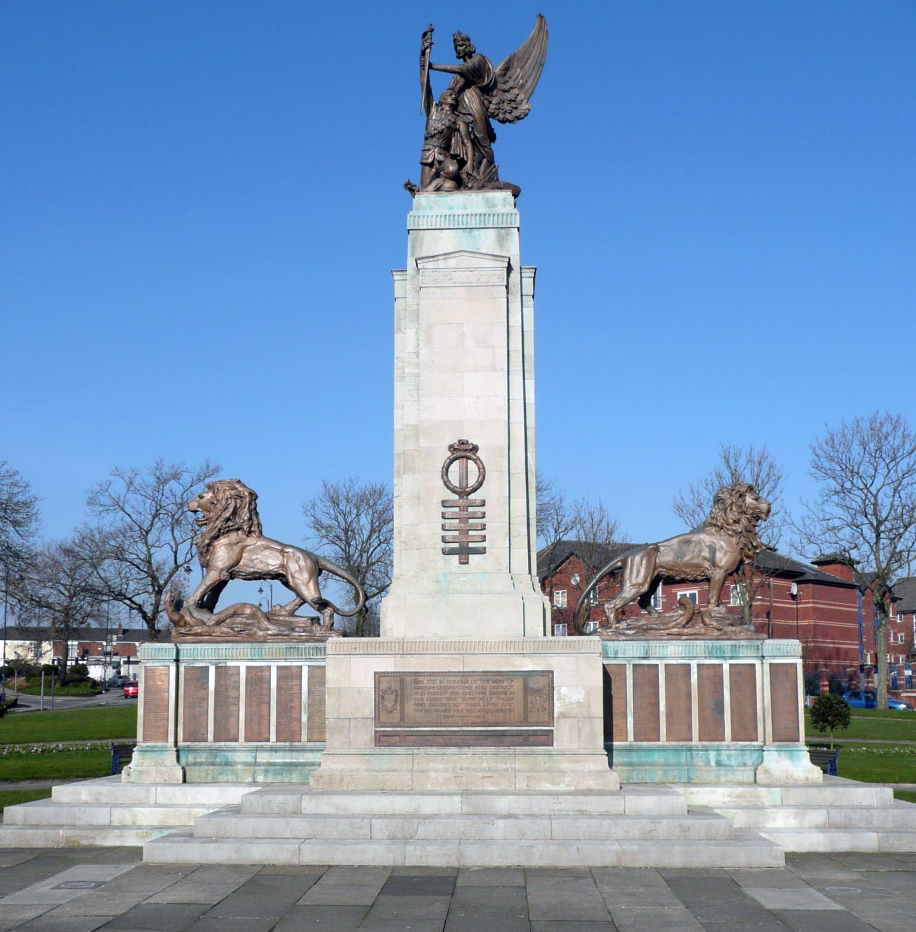
The war memorial, in Memorial Gardens

The Witchwood public house, in the St Petersfield area of the town, has been a music venue since the 1960s, hosting acts such as Muse, The Coral and Lost Prophets. In 2004, The Witchwood came under threat when the area was being redeveloped, but was saved from demolition after a campaign by locals and led by Tom Hingley, drawing support from musicians such as Bert Jansch, The Fall and The Chameleons.

The main war memorial, in Memorial Gardens, consists of a central cenotaph on a plinth, surmounted by a sculpted wounded soldier and the figure of "Peace who is taking the sword of honour" from his hand. It commemorates the 1,512 people from the town who died in the First World War and the 301 who died in the Second World War. The cenotaph is flanked on both sides by bronze lions. The plinth is decorated with military equipment representing the services, as well as bronze tablets listing the Roll of Honour from World War I. Commissioned by the Ashton War Memorial Committee, the statue was sculpted between 1919 and 1922 by John Ashton Floyd, and was unveiled on 16 September 1922 by General Sir Ian Hamilton. The tablet on the front of the memorial reads:

"Erected in honour of the men of Ashton-under-Lyne and district who fought for King and Empire in The Great War, especially those who sacrificed their lives, and whose names are recorded hereon." 1914–1919

== Media ==
Local news and television programmes are provided by BBC North West and ITV Granada. Television signals are received from the Winter Hill TV transmitter.

Local radio stations include:

- BBC Radio Manchester on 95.1 FM
- Capital Manchester and Lancashire on 102.0 FM
- Greatest Hits Radio on 107.4 FM
- Heart North West on 105.4 FM
- Smooth North West on 100.4 FM
- Tameside Radio, a community-based station, which broadcasts from the town on 103.6 FM.

The local newspaper is the Tameside Reporter, which is published on Thursdays.

== Sport ==
The town's most prominent football teams are:

- Ashton United F.C. first played in the 1912–13 as Hurst F.C. before being renamed in 1946. It was the first team in the Manchester Football Association to win an FA Cup tie, when they beat Turton 3–0 in 1883, and in 1885, they were the first winners of the Manchester Senior Cup, beating Newton Heath (which later became Manchester United) in the final. The team have played in the Northern Premier League consistently since the 1992–93 season, except for the 2004–05, 2017–18 and 2018–19 seasons, where they were promoted into the National League North; their home stadium has been Hurst Cross since 1880.
- Curzon Ashton F.C. has been the more successful team in recent years; they were promoted to the National League North for the start of the 2015–16 season where they have remained since; before that, they had been in the Northern Premier League since 2007–08; they play at the Tameside Stadium.
- Ashton Wanderers F.C. played in the third-tier Lancashire Alliance at the start of the 20th century and won the 1902–03 title. However, in so doing, they broke the competition's rules on player wages and had to disband as a consequence.

Other sports teams include:

- East Cheshire Harriers and Tameside Athletics Club are based at Richmond Park Athletics Stadium, which has an all-weather running track with facilities for field events.
- Ashton Cricket Club, which has won the Central Lancashire Cricket League's first and second division twice each, and the Wood Cup four times.
- Ashton Ladysmith Cricket Club is based at the Ladysmith Sport Centre at Rose Hill Road and competes in the North Manchester Cricket League.

== See also ==
- Ashton-under-Lyne munitions explosion
- List of mills in Tameside
- List of people from Tameside
- Listed buildings in Ashton-under-Lyne
