= Ashton-under-Lyne munitions explosion =

1917 disaster

Coordinates: 53.4800°N 2.1030°W

On 13 June 1917, the Hooley Hill Rubber and Chemical Works caught fire and exploded in Ashton-under-Lyne, Greater Manchester, England. The factory was engaged in the production of TNT for the war effort and was completely destroyed. Forty-three people were killed, and most of the surrounding area was left devastated.

== Background ==
The Hooley Hill Rubber and Chemical Company was founded in 1914 by Sylvain Dreyfus and Lucien Gaisman. Dreyfus, a nephew of Charles Dreyfus, founder of the Clayton Aniline Company, was born in 1866 in Alsace in France. Gaisman was a Swiss national from Basel. The company established a factory in Stamford Road, Audenshaw and another in Chatham Street, Edgeley, Stockport.

When war was declared against Germany on 4 August 1914, the company approached the War Office to offer its services. At first they were rebuffed, but they were subsequently involved in the production of TNT, of which there was a chronic shortage. The total British output of TNT before the First World War was around 20 tons per year. A sustained artillery barrage could easily expend many times that amount in a day.

On 28 October 1914 the company was asked to build a plant capable of producing around five tons of TNT per week and after further negotiations a contract was signed on 26 November 1914. The government awarded a grant of £10,000 towards the cost of erecting the plant. A former cotton mill next to the canal in William Street, Ashton-under-Lyne was acquired. Its substantial brick walls and heavy concrete floors were deemed suitable to be adapted as a chemical plant but its location in the middle of a built up area with housing, schools, textile mills and two gasometers was far from ideal. The first deliveries of raw TNT were scheduled to begin in March 1915. Raw TNT was sent to other government-run factories to be refined and crystallised. Production at the site increased to around ten tons per week. By 1917, the capacity of the plant was around 25 tons per week.

== Accident ==
On Wednesday 13 June 1917, it was business as usual at the works in Ashton-under-Lyne. Lucien Gaisman was on his way back from a meeting in London to discuss the future of the company as an explosives manufacturer. A government report had recommended dispensing with smaller, less economic producers of explosives such as the Hooley Hill Rubber and Chemical Company.

Later that afternoon, Sylvain Dreyfus and a chemist, Nathan Daniels, were in the nitrating section of the works when the contents of number nine nitrator became unstable. Despite a frantic effort led by Dreyfus to bring the reaction under control, the contents of the vessel boiled over and set fire to the wooden staging around it. The fire quickly took hold, spreading to the roof. Workers fought to bring the blaze under control to no avail. The flames spread to an area where five tons of TNT packed into kegs was stored. A call was made to the local police station for assistance at around 4.20pm. A few minutes later the works was torn apart by an explosion. It destroyed the factory and threw heavy objects long distances. Most of the workers were killed instantly, including Dreyfus, whose dismembered body was found in the factory yard. The factory was obliterated and two large craters scarred the site. A large crater, where the kegs of TNT had been stored, was about 90 ft by 36 ft across and 5 ft deep. A smaller, shallow crater was just below where the dryer and setting trays used for the final preparation of the TNT had been. Two gasometers in a nearby street were ripped open by the blast, sending a massive fireball hundreds of feet into the air. Hundreds of buildings in the surrounding area were damaged, leaving many of the nearby houses uninhabitable.

The casualties included 43 people dead, more than 120 hospitalised and several hundred with minor injuries. Amongst the dead were 23 employees of the Hooley Hill Rubber and Chemical Works, and eleven adults and nine children from the surrounding area.
