= Ashton Arcades =

Shopping centre in Ashton under Lyne, England

Arcades Shopping Centre
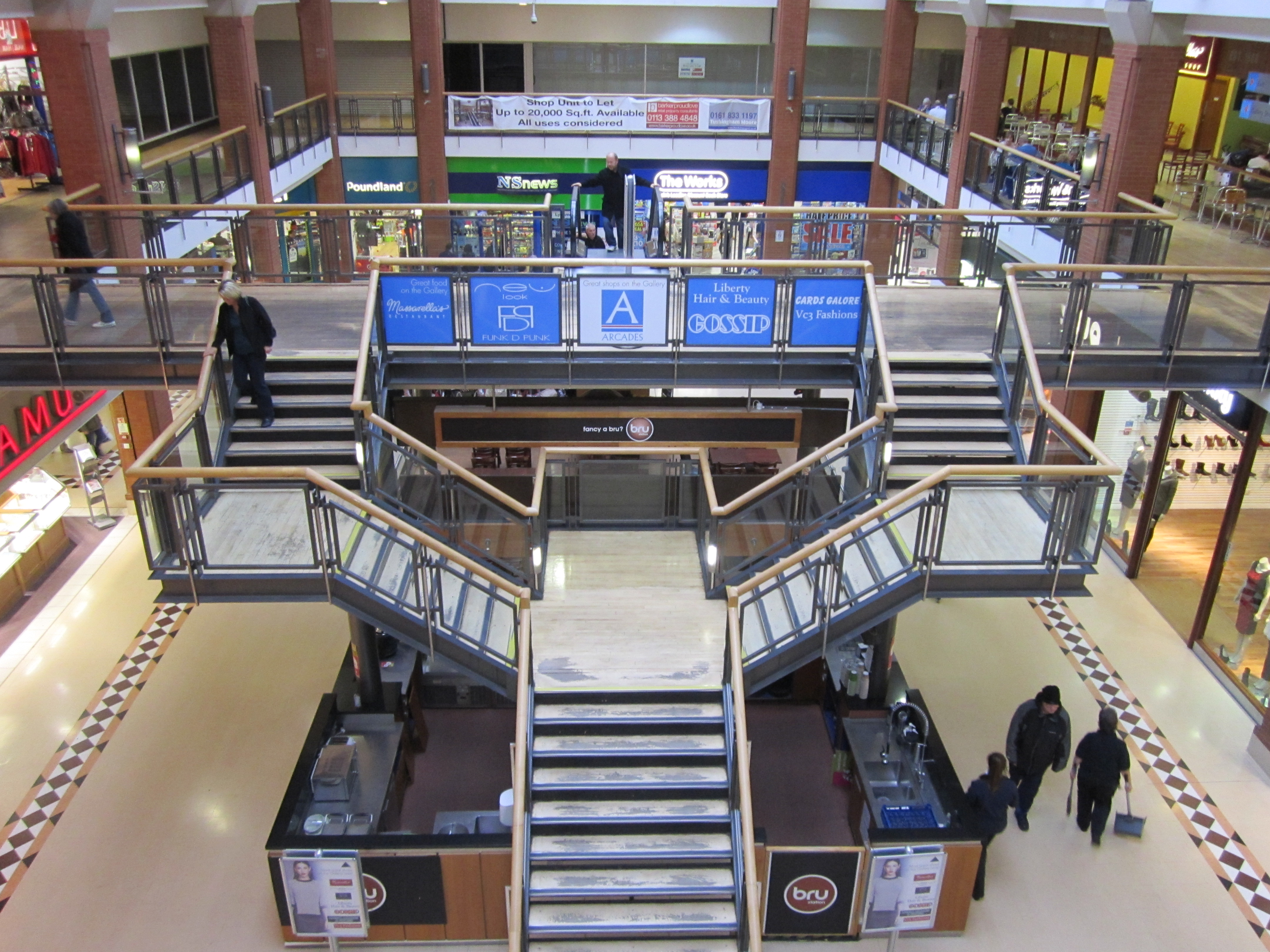
- Ashton Arcades
- Location: Ashton-under-Lyne, Greater Manchester, England
- Coordinates: 53.4893°N 2.0959°W
- Opened: October 1995; 31 years ago
- Owner: Apollo Ashton Unit Trust
- Num. of stores: Around 40 stores
- Floor area: 140,000 sq ft (13,000 m^{2})
- Floors: 2
- Parking: 500 spaces
- Website: arcadesshopping.co.uk

The Ashton Arcades, also known locally as just Arcades, is a medium-sized shopping centre located in Ashton-under-Lyne, Greater Manchester, England.

It accommodates 40 stores, over two floors, and a multi-storey car park. There is an adjacent bee network interchange for Manchester buses and the Manchester Metrolink. The expansion of the centre cost £40m and add 180,000 sq ft (17,000 m^{2}) of retail space which will more than double the current centre.
