= Ashton Ladysmith Cricket Club =

Coordinates: 53.5010°N 2.0673°W

Ashton Ladysmith Cricket Club
League	Greater Manchester Cricket League
Ground	Rose Hill Road, Ashton-under-Lyne, Greater Manchester
Location	Ladysmith Sports Centre

Ashton Ladysmith Cricket Club are an open age English cricket team, based in the town of Ashton-under-Lyne in Tameside, Greater Manchester. The club plays its home games at the Ladysmith Sports Centre on Rose Hill Road, and competes in the North Manchester Cricket League. The club was formerly known as Ashton St. James Cricket Club and played their games on St Albans Avenue in Ashton-under-Lyne.

Thanks to lottery funding the club moved to a new ground on Rose Hill Road, and shortly after changed their name to Ashton Ladysmith after Ladysmith Barracks which occupied the site on which the ground is now situated.

In October 2007 Ashton Ladysmith's clubhouse was set on fire. Thanks to the work undertaken by its members the clubhouse was re-generated thanks to various funds.

In September 2010, the club was awarded a £600 grant for new equipment and coaching expenses, as part of a scheme to reduce anti-social behaviour.

In 2015 the club won the Calverley Cup in the final season of the North Manchester Cricket League. Richard Taylor scored a 50 and Joe Walsh took 5 wickets and man of the match but this has not been discussed since.

The club has three open age teams, operating in the Greater Manchester Cricket League.
