= Economically inactive =

Jobless people not seeking employment

Economically inactive refers to people outside the workforce who are not employed, but not looking for work. It includes students and the early retired.

== United Kingdom ==
In 2024, in the UK, approximately one-fifth of the workforce is considered economically inactive. About 30% of economically inactive people have a long-term illness.

The large number of economically inactive people has led to calls for work reform.

== See also ==
- Economic activity rate
