= Listed buildings in Ashton-under-Lyne =

Ashton-under-Lyne is a town in the Tameside, Greater Manchester, England. The town and the countryside to the north contain 51 listed buildings that are recorded in the National Heritage List for England. Of these, one is listed at Grade I, the highest of the three grades, seven are at Grade II*, the middle grade, and the others are at Grade II, the lowest grade.

The growth of the town came with the arrival of canals and with the growth of the cotton industry in the later 18th century. Before this, the earliest listed buildings are houses, farmhouses, and a church with items in its churchyard. Buildings associated with the canals include an aqueduct and a bridge. Listed buildings from the 19th century include more churches and houses, civic buildings, schools, cotton mills that were later used for other purposes, railway viaducts, and a commemorative tower. Listed buildings from the 20th century include war memorials, a theatre, and a telephone kiosk.

== Key ==
Grade	Criteria
I	Buildings of exceptional interest, sometimes considered to be internationally important
II*	Particularly important buildings of more than special interest
II	Buildings of national importance and special interest

== Buildings ==
Name and location	Photograph	Date	Notes	Grade
Old Hall Fold; 53.50016°N 2.11164°W		Medieval	A cruck-framed house with brick walls, rendered at the rear, and a stone-slate roof, both dating from the 18th century. There are two storeys, three bays, and a right cross-wing. The windows are casements. Inside there are three cruck trusses, an inglenook, and a bressumer.	II*
St Michael's Church; 53.48770°N 2.08983°W		15th century	Although some earlier fabric remains, most of the church results from a series of episodes of rebuilding in the 19th century, with the tower added in 1886–88 by J. S. Crowther, and the north porch in about 1920. The older part of the church is in sandstone and the later parts in gritstone, and the church is mainly in Perpendicular style. It consists of a nave and clerestory, north and south aisles, all of which have embattled parapets, north and south porches, a chancel, and a west tower. The tower has four stages, buttresses rising to crocketed pinnacles, a west doorway with a moulded surround, clock faces, and a pierced embattled parapet. The east window has seven lights.	I
Front garden wall and gate, Taunton Hall; 53.50036°N 2.11183°W	—	Early 17th century	The wall and gate piers are in stone. The gate piers are square, with moulded bases and caps, and have acorn finials. The walls have round-topped coping.	II
Jeremy Cottage; 53.51458°N 2.06456°W	—	1642	A stone farmhouse with a stone-slate roof, two storeys, and four bays. The first bay is gabled, and the fourth bay is a later addition. The windows are mullioned, and inside is an inglenook.	II
Lower Fold Farmhouse and Farm Cottage; 53.51240°N 2.08574°W	—	17th century (probable)	The farmhouse is timber framed and later encased in brick, and the cottage, dated 1710, is in stone and forms a cross-wing to the left. They have stone-slate roofs and two storeys. The house has three gabled bays, a rear lean-to extension, and doors and windows with stone sills and lintels. The cottage has two bays and a doorway with a moulded surround and dated lintel, now blocked. There is one mullioned window, and the others date from later.	II
Taunton Hall; 53.50024°N 2.11184°W		17th century (or earlier)	Basically a cruck-framed hall with many alterations and extensions. The walls are rendered and the roof is in stone-slate. There are two storeys, three bays, and a rear wing. On the front is a 19th-century porch, and windows of various types, some having architraves, and lintels decorated with rosettes. Inside the cross-walls are timber framed, and the party wall has a cruck truss and wattle and daub infill.	II
Fairbottom Farmhouse; 53.51347°N 2.09112°W	—	Late 17th century (probable)	A stone farmhouse with quoins, a continuous hood mould, an eaves cornice, and a stone-slate roof. It has two storeys, a four-bay main range, a wing to the rear right, and a left cross-wing. The doorway has Doric columns, a large lintel, and a pediment. Some windows are casements, some are sashes, and some were mullioned with the mullions removed.	II
Hartshead Green Farmhouse and Cottage; 53.51457°N 2.06615°W	—	Late 17th century	The farmhouse was extended in the 18th century with the addition of a wing. It is in stone with a slate roof, and has two storeys and an irregular plan, consisting of a main range of three bays, a wing to the right, and a right lean-to. The windows are mullioned.	II
John Leech grave headstone 53.48782°N 2.08993°W	—	1689	The headstone is adjacent to the north porch of St Michael's Church. It carries a long inscription relating to the number of his offspring, and a coat of arms.	II
Higher Alt Hill Farmhouse; 53.51431°N 2.08538°W	—	1764	A stone farmhouse with a tile roof, two storeys, three bays, and rear extensions. The central doorway has a moulded surround and a lintel with a shield containing initials and the date. The windows are mullioned.	II
Gorsey Farm Cottage; 53.50460°N 2.06254°W	—	1766	A stone house with a stone-slate roof, two storeys, three bays, a recessed two-storey, two-bay extension to the left, and a flat-roofed garage on the right. The central doorway has a moulded surround, and above it is a datestone. The windows are mullioned with multiple lights.	II
121 Stamford Street; 53.48793°N 2.09009°W	—	Late 18th century	A house, later offices, in brick on a projecting plinth, that has an eaves cornice with triglyphs, and a slate roof. There are three storeys, four bays, and a small wing and outshut at the rear. In the second bay is a doorway with ¾ columns, a radial fanlight and a dentilled open pediment. Another doorway in the first bay has a Gibbs surround. The windows are sashes with stone sills and flat brick arches.	II
Four Winds; 53.51817°N 2.06500°W	—	Late 18th century	A stone house on a plinth, with quoins, a band, a modillion eaves cornice, and a stone-slate roof. There are two storeys, four bays, and extensions to the left and the rear. The doorway in the second bay has a Gibbs surround and a pediment. The window above it has an architrave, a keystone and a flat hood, and the other windows are mullioned.	II
Aqueduct over the River Tame; 53.48226°N 2.09936°W		1794–1801	The aqueduct carries the Peak Forest Canal over the River Tame. It is in stone with arches in engineering brick, and consists of three elliptical arches, between which are tapering pilasters and cutwaters with semicircular ends. The aqueduct has two stone bands, and the parapet walls are curved and end in square piers.	II
230 Stamford Street; 53.48660°N 2.09665°W		1810–12	A house, later offices, then a church, it is in brick on a stone plinth, with stone dressings, a band, an eaves cornice, and a hipped slate roof. There are two storeys, a central block of five bays, and wings of three and two bays. The central three bays project slightly under a pediment, and contain a central portico with Ionic columns and a dentilled entablature. The windows are sashes with stone sills and cambered brick arches.	II
Wilshaw Dale Farmhouse and Cottage; 53.49941°N 2.10076°W	—	1812	Two stone houses with a slate roof, two storeys, and a front of three bays. The right two bays form the cottage, which has a door with a square-cut surround, and a dated lintel, three windows with stone sills and lintels, and a bow window. The farmhouse has a doorway with an ogee head in the gable end, four windows with ogee heads, and a 20th-century casement window.	II
St Peter's Church; 53.48396°N 2.10586°W		1821–24	A Commissioners' church designed by Francis Goodwin in Perpendicular style, it is in stone with a slate roof. The church consists of a nave, a canted vestry at the east end acting as a chancel, and a west tower. Along the sides are buttresses rising to form crocketed pinnacles. The tower has three stages, buttresses rising to piers then pinnacles, clock faces, and an open traceried parapet. At the east end is a large rose window.	II*
Odd Whim; 53.49612°N 2.06923°W	—	1825	Originally a gatehouse built as part of a Millenarian scheme, and later used for other purposes. It is in rendered brick with a pyramidal slate roof. The main part has a square plan, two storeys, and three bays. Above the central doorway is a pediment, and the windows are sashes.	II
Methodist Church; 53.48727°N 2.09269°W		1832	The former Methodist church is in brick with a slate roof, sides of seven and four bays, two storeys, and a 20th-century extension to the east. The four-bay entrance front is pedimented and has a stone plinth, and a tetrastyle Greek Doric porch flanked by sash windows, and there are three windows in the tympanum. Along the sides the ground floor windows have flat heads and those on the upper floor have semicircular heads.	II
Bridge No. 30, Peak Forest Canal; 53.48244°N 2.09959°W		1835	The bridge carries the towpath of the Ashton Canal over the Peak Forest Canal. It is in stone, and has a single segmental arch. The parapets consist of monolithic slabs over a band.	II
The Oxford Mills; 53.47785°N 2.10727°W		1840	An integrated cotton mill, consisting of two mills, the later dated 1851, with a warehouse and office block between. The mills have an internal structure of cast iron and brick, and have a brick exterior and Welsh slate roofs. The first mill has six storeys, and sides of 28 and six bays, incorporating an engine house. On the inner face is a semi-octagonal stair tower, the warehouse has five storeys, and sides of ten and five bays. The warehouse is linked to the second mill, which has four storeys and sides of ten and five bays, and adjoining it are single-storey weaving sheds.	II
Town Hall; 53.48982°N 2.09345°W		1840	The town hall was extended to the left in 1878. It is in stone, in Neoclassical style, and has two storeys and a basement. The main part has five bays wit giant attached Corinthian columns, a dentilled entablature, and a balustraded parapet. The ground floor is rusticated, and has round-arched openings, and the windows on the upper floor have architraves. The extension is in a similar style, with giant pilasters.	II
Careers Office; 53.48959°N 2.09430°W	—	c. 1840	The offices were reconstructed in the 20th century with a steel-framed internal structure. The exterior is in stone on a projecting plinth, with sill bands, an eaves cornice, and a blocking course. There are three storeys and fronts of eight and three bays. Two doorways have architraves and console brackets supporting flat hoods, and the other doorway has pilasters. The windows are sashes, one is larger with an elliptical head and a rusticated surround and a dropped keystone. At the top in the centre is a carved lion.	II
Gateway and flanking walls, former Ladysmith Barracks; 53.49842°N 2.06597°W		1842–43	The gateway and walls are in stone. The gateway has a large central segmental-arched carriage entrance, flanked by smaller flat-headed pedestrian entries, and contains cast iron gates. The central arch has lettered voussoirs, a band, and a pediment. The walls stretch for 30 metres (98 ft) and are about 5 metres (16 ft) tall.	II
Park Parade Railway Viaduct, Eastern crossing 53.48264°N 2.09589°W		1845	The viaduct was built by the Oldham, Ashton and Guide Bridge Railway to carry its line over the River Tame. It is in stone, and consists of seven segmental arches. The arches have rusticated voussoirs with keystones, and are carried on square piers with shaped cutwaters. The parapets have bands and coping.	II
Park Parade Railway Viaduct; Western crossing 53.48079°N 2.10020°W		1845	The viaduct was built by the Oldham, Ashton and Guide Bridge Railway to carry its line over the River Tame. It is in stone, and consists of three segmental arches. The arches have rusticated voussoirs, and are carried on square piers with shaped cutwaters. The parapets have bands, coping, and square terminal piers.	II
Christ Church; 53.49372°N 2.10130°W		1847–48	A Commissioners' church in Gothic Revival style, it is in brick with stone dressings and a slate roof. The church consists of a nave with a clerestory, north and south aisles, north and south gabled transepts, and a chancel with a chapel and a vestry. At the west end is a bellcote. Most of the windows are cusped lancets, and the clerestory windows are trefoils.	II
St John's Church, Hurst; 53.50014°N 2.08132°W		1847–49	A Commissioners' church that was designed by E. H. Shellard in Gothic Revival style, with the transepts, the south chapel and the tower added in 1862. It is in yellow sandstone and has a slate roof with coped gables. The church consists of a nave, north and south aisles, north and south transepts, a chancel with a chapel and an organ chamber, and a northwest steeple, which is almost free-standing. The steeple has a three-stage tower with buttresses and a circular stair turret, and it rises with stepped broaches to become octagonal to accommodate the spire.	II
St Augustine's Church, Hartwell Green; 53.51418°N 2.06516°W		Mid-19th century	The church, later converted for residential use, is in stone with a stone-slate roof. It is in Gothic Revival style, and consists of a nave, an apse, and a porch. Some of the windows are mullioned, some are lancets, and on the south side is a rose window.	II
Oddfellows Hall; 53.48650°N 2.09567°W		1855	A range of buildings, including a hall and a shop, on a corner site. It is in brick with stone dressings, rusticated quoins, bands, a bracketed eaves cornice, and a hipped slate roof. There are three storeys, three bays on Stamford Street and seven on Booth Street. The Stamford Street front has a central arched doorway with a keystone flanked by modern shop fronts. On the middle floor is a central niche and sash windows with architraves and flat heads and datestones above, and on the top floor the windows have segmental heads. On the Booth Street front are similar windows, and two elaborate doorways both with pilasters, and one with a dentilled entablature, the other with a fanlight and keystone arch.	II
Albion Warehouse; 53.48998°N 2.08721°W		1861–62	Originally a school, later used for other purposes, it is in polychromatic brick on a projecting plinth, with stone dressings, a band, an eaves cornice, and a hipped slate roof, and is in Italianate style. There are two storeys, eleven bays, projecting stair wings at the rear, and a lower four-bay wing to the left. At the front and at the rear the central three bays project and are pedimented. The doorways have columns with foliated capitals, a dropped keystone and a semicircular hood, and the windows are casements. At the rear is a tower with a pyramidal roof.	II*
Hartshead Pike Tower; 53.51834°N 2.06090°W		1863	The tower was built to commemorate the marriage of HRH Albert Edward and Princess Alexandra, and replaced an earlier tower on the site. It is in stone, and consists of a circular tower with a conical head. Above the doorway on the west side are inscribed stones. The tower also has lancet windows, corbelled eaves, dormers, and stepped gables.	II
St James' Church; 53.49155°N 2.08943°W		1863–65	The church is in stone and has a slate roof with coped gables and finials. It is in Decorated style, and consists of a nave, a south porch, a north transept containing a vestry and an organ chamber, a double-gabled south transept, a chancel with a vestry, and twin west spires. The spires are square at the base, rise through broaches to become octagonal, and have a gableted bell stage surmounted by a spire.	II
Market Hall; 53.48914°N 2.09246°W		1867	The market hall was extended in 1881 and 1930. It is in brick with stone dressings, one storey, a rectangular plan, and a front of 19 bays with a central tower. The hall has a projecting plinth, an arcade of semicircular arches with keystones, an impost band, and a modillioneaves cornice with a blocking course. The tower has two stages above the parapet, and has a coat of arms, a datestone, polychromatic brick decoration, clock faces in oculi, a cornice and a balustraded parapet. Above the pedimented entrance on the south side are a pair of lions.	II
Gibson Terrace; 53.47889°N 2.10583°W	—	1869	A terrace of workers' houses in red brick with sandstone dressings, a lintel band, a dentilled sill band, and Welsh slate roofs with coped gables. The houses have two storeys, and the two central houses and the end houses also have attics; each house has two bays. Above the central houses is a pediment, and over the end houses are gablets. The doorways have shouldered jambs, moulded lintels, and fanlights. The windows are sashes, on the ground floor they have flat heads, and on the upper floor the heads are rounded.	II
St. Michael's House; 53.48795°N 2.08971°W	—	1869	A brick building in High Victorian Gothic style with stone dressings, bands, a machicolated eaves band, a parapet, and a slate roof. There are two storeys, a basement and attics, and a main front of six bays. The basement storey is in stone, and on the brickwork is diaper decoration. Above the doorway is a pierced balcony and a gable, the windows have pointed heads, and in the attic are gabled dormers.	II
Former Municipal Baths; 53.48487°N 2.10150°W		1870–71	The former swimming baths are in brick with stone dressings and a slate roof, and in Italian Romanesque style. The building has a large swimming hall with pilasters, a machicolated frieze below the eaves, and round-headed windows. At the northeast is a tower with vents towards the top between machicolations, and beyond that is a lower two-storey block. Inside there is a hammerbeam roof.	II*
The Twelve Apostles Terrace; 53.47971°N 2.10736°W		Late 19th century	A terrace of red brick workers' houses with sandstone dressings and a Welsh slate roof. They have a linear plan, two storeys with attics, a total of twelve houses, each with three bays. The outer houses project forward and are gabled. The doorways and windows have segmental heads, the doorways have fanlights, and the windows are sashes. The eaves are carried on decorative brackets.	II
Holy Trinity Church; 53.48914°N 2.10336°W		1876–78	The church, designed by J. Medland and Henry Taylor, is in red brick with decoration in blue brick, and has sandstone dressings and a Welsh slate roof with coped gables. It consists of a nave with a clerestory, a north aisle with a vestry porch at the east end, a south aisle with an organ chamber at the east end, a north transept, and a chancel with an apse. At the west end is a lean-to baptistry and porches, flying buttresses, and a gabled bellcote. At the east end is a circular stair tower, and another flying buttress. Most of the windows are lancets.	II
Wall, railings and gateways, Holy Trinity Church, School and Vicarage; 53.48911°N 2.10388°W		1876–78	The wall and railings, designed by J. Medland and Henry Taylor, enclose the area occupied by the church, school and vicarage. The wall is in brick with stone dressings, and the railings and gates are in iron. On the west side it incorporates a drinking fountain with a projecting bowl. At the northwest and southwest corners are angled gateways consisting of arched entrances rising from gate piers and abutment walls. At the top of each gateway is a stepped gable containing an open niche.	II
Holy Trinity Vicarage; 53.48919°N 2.10264°W	—	1881	The vicarage, designed by J. Medland and Henry Taylor, is in red brick with decoration in blue brick, and has sandstone dressings and a Welsh slate roof with crested ridge tiles. It has two storeys, a double-depth plan, and three bays. The doorway has a pointed arch and a hood mould, some windows are mullioned and others are casements. The vicarage has gables with bargeboards, some with finials.	II
Cavendish Mill; 53.48388°N 2.09726°W		1884–85	A cotton mill, later converted in to flats, it is in brick with concrete floors, and has an irregular plan. The main block has five and six storeys, and sides of 14 and nine bays, and there is a small extension containing the engine house. At the southeast is an octagonal stair turret wrapped around the chimney.	II*
Holy Trinity School; 53.48951°N 2.10284°W		1885	The school, designed by J. Medland and Henry Taylor, is in red brick with sandstone dressings and a Welsh slate roof with coped gables. It has an apsidal hall and a tall tower with three stages, buttresses, an embattled parapet, and a pyramidal roof. Other features include hipped roofs, decorative panels, one with a date, and lancet windows.	II
Hugh Mason memorial statue 53.47980°N 2.10828°W		1887	The statue commemorates Hugh Mason, a local mill owner and politician. It consists of a life-size bronze figure standing on an inscribed polished granite pedestal.	II
Albion Congregational Church; 53.48774°N 2.08704°W		1890–95	The church is in stone with a slate roof. It consists of a nave with a clerestory, north and south aisles, north and south transepts, a chancel with an organ chamber and a vestry, and a northwest steeple. The steeple has a four-stage tower with gableted buttresses, a doorway, clock faces, a parapet with corner pinnacles, and a recessed spire with lucarnes. The aisles have a coped parapet, and flying buttresses that end in gabled pinnacles. On the roof is a flèche.	II*
Former Post Office; 53.48801°N 2.09329°W		1891	The former post office is in red brick on a plinth, with sandstone dressings and a slate roof, and is in Renaissance style. It is on a corner site, and has two storeys with an attic, a front of five bays, and a single-storey three-bay extension to the left. The building has rusticated quoins, a band, a moulded cornice over the ground floor, three balustraded balconies, one with urn finials, an eaves frieze, and a prominent moulded cornice on moulded brackets. The doorway has a rusticated surround, and the upper floor windows have round heads, architraves and fluted pilasters with Corinthian capitals.	II
Public Library; 53.48726°N 2.09765°W		1891–93	The library is in stone with a slate roof, and is in Gothic style. It has two and three storeys, and a single-storey seven-bay wing to the left. On the front is a large tower with a pyramidal roof. This contains an entrance flanked by columns, a decorative gable and a pierced parapet. Above it is a three-light window over which is a pierced balcony, and to the right is an octagonal stair turret with a conical roof. The bay to the left contains an oriel window, and at the extreme left is a projecting bay with an oriel window.	II
Tameside Hippodrome; 53.48779°N 2.09753°W		1904	Originally a theatre, it was refurbished as a cinema in Art Nouveau style in 1933, and is in brick with a hipped slate roof. There are two storeys and a front of three bays. The central bay projects under a pediment, and has a canopy with a central pediment, and four windows on the upper floor. The outer bays have a parapet with ball finials, and on the upper floor are windows with frames dating from the 1930s.	II
Ashton-under-Lyne and District War Memorial; 53.48877°N 2.08790°W		1922	The war memorial stands in Memorial Gardens. It is in Portland stone, and consists of a three-stepped platform, a pedestal with a moulded plinth, and a tall square shaft. On the two wings of the pedestal are life-size bronze lions, and on top of the shaft is a bronze depiction of a winged Victory ending over a wounded soldier. On the front of the shaft are bronze commemorative fixtures, and on the pedestal are bronze plaques with inscriptions and the names of those lost in both World Wars.	II*
Gatepiers, overthrows and railings, Memorial Gardens; 53.48860°N 2.08873°W		1922	At the southwest entrance to the Memorial Gardens are a pair of square gate piers flanked by wrought iron railings in a segmental concave curve, ending is another pair of piers. The piers are in Portland stone and have moulded cornices and flaming urns. Between the central piers is an elaborate overthrow carrying wording and a coat of arms. The railings are in four panels divided by openwork piers with urns. At the south entrance are a similar pair of piers and an overthrow.	II
Telephone kiosk outside Market Hall; 53.48897°N 2.09211°W		1935	A K6 type telephone kiosk, designed by Giles Gilbert Scott. Constructed in cast iron with a square plan and a dome, it has three unperforated crowns in the top panels.	II
