= Ashton Old Baths =

Listed building in Greater Manchester, England

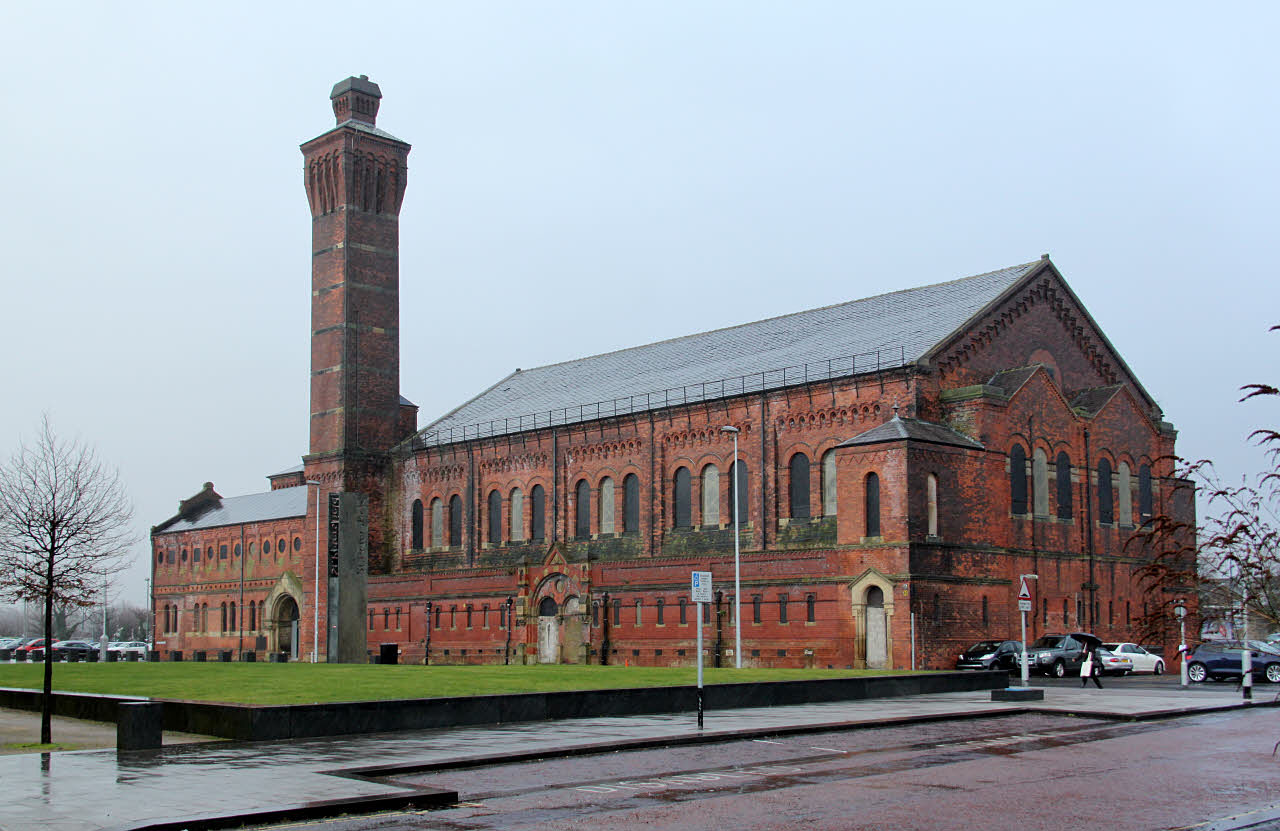
- Ashton Old Baths in 2014

- Location within Greater Manchester
- Alternative names: Former Municipal Baths

General information
- Architectural style: Italian Romanesque
- Location: Henry Square, Ashton-under-Lyne, Greater Manchester, England
- Coordinates: 53.48485°N 2.10165°W
- Year built: 1870–71
- Opened: 6 September 1870; 156 years ago
- Renovated: 2016

Design and construction
- Architects: Henry Paull and George Robinson
- Main contractor: T. Clay & Sons

Renovating team
- Architect: MCAU Architects

Website
- ashtonoldbaths.co.uk

Listed Building – Grade II*
- Official name: Former Municipal Baths
- Designated: 2 April 1975
- Reference no.: 1067992

Ashton Old Baths (officially listed as Former Municipal Baths) is a Victorian-era former public bathhouse on Henry Square in Ashton-under-Lyne, a town within Tameside, Greater Manchester, England. Built between 1870 and 1871, it was one of the early municipal swimming facilities in the United Kingdom. The building is designed in an Italian Romanesque style and features a large brick structure with a 120-foot (37-metre) chimney that served as a flue for steam boilers. It is designated as a Grade II* listed building.

Following its closure in 1975 and a prolonged period of disuse, the building underwent restoration in 2016. The project adopted a "building within a building" approach, creating new interior accommodation for digital and creative businesses while retaining the historic exterior.

== History ==
The baths were commissioned by the Ashton-under-Lyne Corporation and designed by architects Henry Paull and George Robinson. The foundation stone was laid in October 1869 by Henry T. Darnton, the mayor of Ashton-under-Lyne, on a site donated by the Earl of Stamford. Construction cost approximately £16,000, and the facility officially opened in 1870. The project was undertaken in response to growing concerns about public health and sanitation during the Victorian era, reflecting the period's emphasis on improving hygiene and leisure opportunities for urban communities.

The building originally housed a range of facilities. At its core was a main swimming pool, measuring 100 feet (30 m) by 40 feet (12 m), intended primarily for male bathers. A smaller pool, measuring 27 feet (8.2 m) by 15 feet (4.6 m), was provided for female bathers. The complex also included private bathrooms and Victorian Turkish baths, reflecting the variety of bathing arrangements offered at the time.

Beyond bathing facilities, the structure incorporated ancillary spaces, including a police station and a fire engine station, making it a multifunctional civic building within the town.

During winter months, the main pool was covered with a wooden floor and converted into a skating rink, concert hall, and meeting venue, accommodating up to 4,000 people. A water filtration system was added in 1915. The baths remained in use until 1975, after which they closed due to the opening of modern facilities.

On 2 April 1975, Ashton Old Baths was designated a Grade II* listed building for its architectural and historic significance. The building then fell into disrepair and was placed on the Heritage at Risk Register.

After decades of dereliction, the building underwent restoration completed in 2016, funded by the Heritage Lottery Fund, the European Regional Development Fund, and Tameside Council. The redevelopment introduced a "building within a building" concept, providing new internal accommodation for digital and creative businesses inside the historic shell. The project retained the Victorian exterior as part of the building's adaptive reuse.

== Architecture ==
The building is constructed in Flemish bond brickwork with a slate roof and stone dressings, designed in the Italian Romanesque style. The principal feature is a large swimming hall, arranged in five bays, with a prominent tower at the north-east corner and subsidiary accommodation to the east.

The swimming hall is articulated with flat pilasters and a machicolated frieze below the eaves. Each bay of the upper storey contains three round-headed windows with hood moulds and glazing bars. Other elevations follow a similar treatment. At ground level, a lean-to structure incorporates a central entrance feature with two arched doorways and numerous small arched lights beneath drip moulds.

The Lombardic tower includes vent openings near the top, set between bold machicolations, while a similarly detailed chimney rises from the roof apex. To the left of the tower, an elaborate entrance surround leads to a two-storey wing, which features paired windows on the lower floor and 11 round windows on the first floor.

=== Interior restoration ===
The 2016 restoration introduced a method of adapting the historic structure for contemporary use. A self-contained steel and glass framework was installed inside the original pool hall, providing office and meeting spaces while retaining the visibility of the Victorian walls and roof trusses. The design allows original architectural features, such as the hammerbeam roof and arched brickwork, to remain exposed alongside the building's internal functions.

== See also ==
- Grade II* listed buildings in Greater Manchester
- Listed buildings in Ashton-under-Lyne
