= Albion United Reformed Church, Ashton-under-Lyne =

Listed church in Greater Manchester, England

Albion Congregational Church
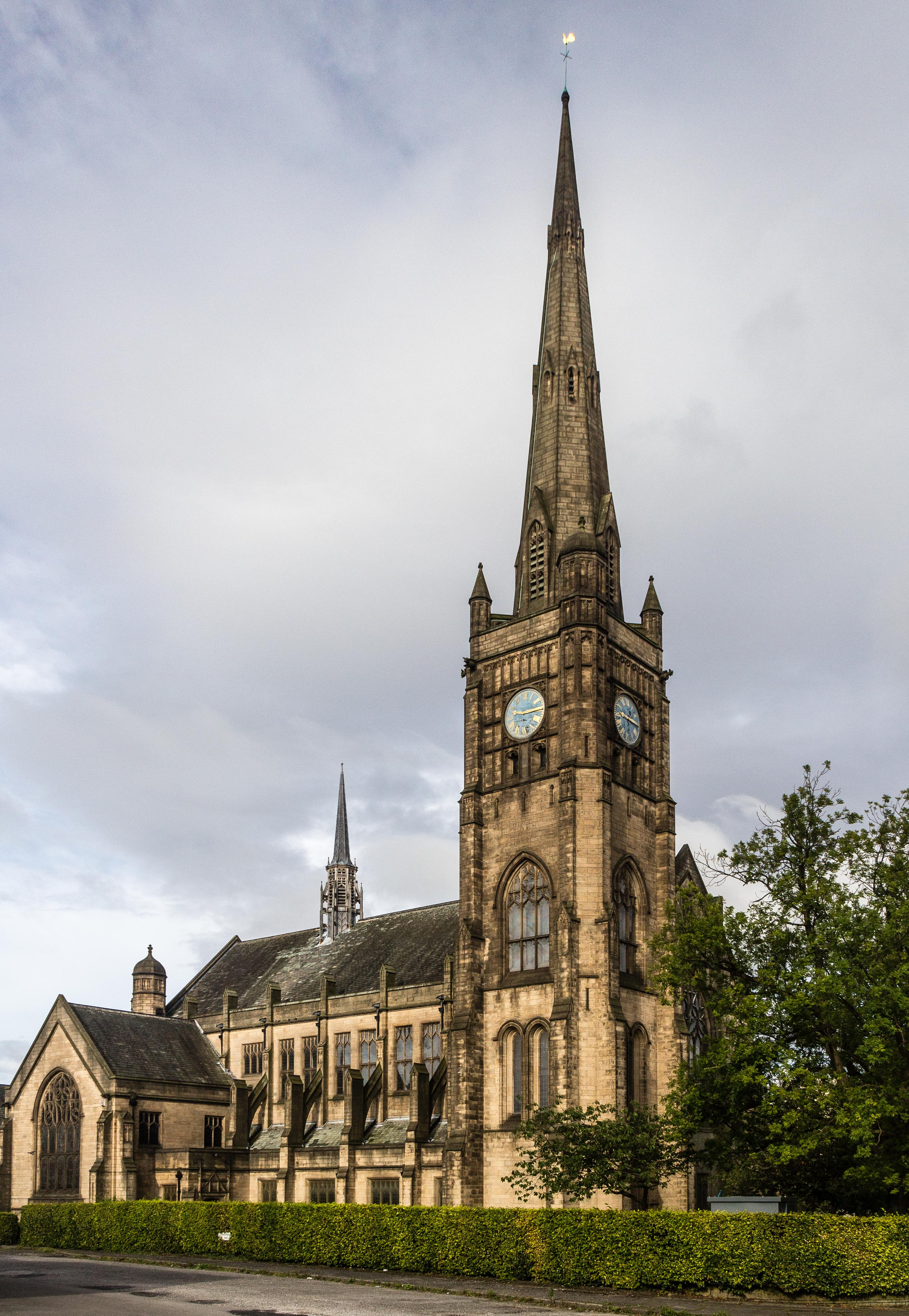
- Albion Congregational Church in 2015

- Location in Greater Manchester
- 53°29′15″N 2°05′13″W
- OS grid reference: SJ 94326 99003
- Location: Stamford Street East, Ashton-under-Lyne, Greater Manchester
- Country: England
- Denomination: Congregational
- Website: albionurc.org.uk

Architecture
- Heritage designation: Grade II*
- Designated: 12 January 1967
- Architect: John Brooke
- Architectural type: Church
- Style: Gothic Revival
- Groundbreaking: 1890
- Completed: 1895

Albion Congregational Church, now Albion United Reformed Church, is a Grade II* listed church on Stamford Street East in Ashton-under-Lyne, a market town in Tameside, Greater Manchester, England. Designed by the Manchester architect John Brooke, it was built between 1890 and 1895 as a major Nonconformist landmark in the town.

== History ==
Albion Congregational Church was constructed between 1890 and 1895 to the designs of the Manchester architect John Brooke, forming one of the most prominent Nonconformist buildings in Ashton-under-Lyne. The foundation stone was laid in 1890, and the completed church opened five years later as a major statement of late‑Victorian Congregational confidence supported by leading local industrialists.

The design for the church was exhibited at the Royal Academy in 1892.

On 12 January 1967, the church was designated a Grade II* listed building.

Following the formation of the United Reformed Church in 1972, the congregation joined the new denomination and the building became known as Albion United Reformed Church.

== Architecture ==
The church is constructed in ashlar with a roof of slate, and comprises a clerestory, nave, aisle passages, a north‑west tower, transepts, and a chancel flanked by a vestry and an organ chamber. It is designed in the Gothic Revival style, specifically a Decorated style. The eight‑bay nave, with five‑bay aisles, stands on a plinth and is supported by flying buttresses that rise to the coped parapet with gabled pinnacles above. The aisles contain three‑light windows, while the clerestory is lit by tall paired two‑light transomed openings, each with a flat traceried head. The transepts have five‑light windows, and the west and east ends contain seven‑light windows with tracery, all positioned beneath raked parapets. The chancel is of two bays, and the roofline is marked by an elaborate flèche.

The four‑stage tower is defined by set‑back buttresses, both weathered and gableted, and includes an arched doorway, cusped lancet openings, and a three‑light transomed window at the third stage. The fourth stage carries clock faces positioned in front of blind arcading. Above, the spire, fitted with lucarnes, rises from behind a parapet with corner pinnacles.

=== Interior ===
Internally, the building is finished throughout in ashlar red sandstone. A narthex occupies the space beneath the gallery. The nave arcade is moulded and carried on octagonal columns with foliated capitals. The nave is lofty and covered by trusses with angelic hammerbeams rising from corbels that are carved. Timber fittings comprise the pulpit with sounding board, stalls, pews, chancel panelling, and organ case. The transepts and east window contain stained glass by Morris & Co. The organ, built in 1894 by T. C. Lewis, was rebuilt in 1953 by Rushworth and Dreaper. A specification of the organ can be found on the National Pipe Organ Register and on Jonathan Scott's concert pages. The reredos is arranged as a tiled memorial to both World Wars, installed by Pilkingtons in 1921.

== See also ==
- Grade II* listed buildings in Greater Manchester
- Listed buildings in Ashton-under-Lyne
