= Ashton-under-Lyne War Memorial =

War memorial in Greater Manchester, England

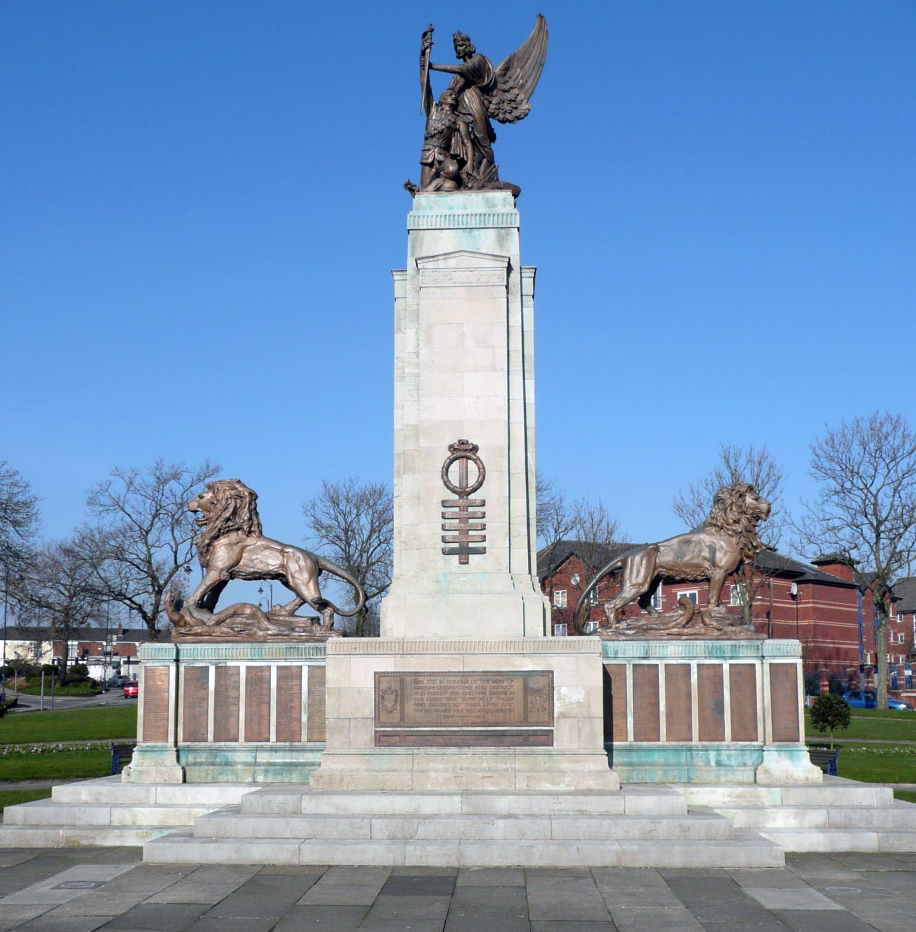
- The war memorial in 2008

- Location within Greater Manchester

General information
- Architectural style: Neoclassical
- Location: Old Street, Ashton-under-Lyne, Greater Manchester, England
- Coordinates: 53.48875°N 2.08787°W
- Year built: 1922; 104 years ago

Technical details
- Material: Portland stone

Design and construction
- Architect: Percy Howard
- Other designers: John Ashton Floyd (sculptor)

Listed Building – Grade II*
- Official name: Ashton-under-Lyne and District War Memorial
- Designated: 14 July 1987
- Reference no.: 1067996

Ashton-under-Lyne War Memorial (officially listed as Ashton-under-Lyne and District War Memorial) is a Grade II* listed monument in the Memorial Gardens on Old Street in Ashton-under-Lyne, a town within Tameside, Greater Manchester, England. It commemorates the men of Ashton and surrounding districts who served and died during the First World War and later conflicts.

== History ==
Ashton-under-Lyne suffered heavy losses during the First World War, with over 1,500 men killed. A memorial scheme proposed in 1919 was abandoned due to cost, and a new design was commissioned from local architect Percy Howard and Manchester-based sculptor John Ashton Floyd, who also collaborated on the Waterloo and Taunton district memorial in Ashton.

The memorial was funded by public subscription at a cost of £8,000. It was unveiled on 16 September 1922 by General Sir Ian Hamilton and dedicated by Rev. W. A. Parry. During the ceremony, a wooden viewing platform collapsed, injuring around 40 people. Additional panels commemorating the dead of the Second World War were added and unveiled on 11 November 1950 by the mayor of Ashton, alderman E. Clark.

On 14 July 1987, Ashton-under-Lyne War Memorial was designated a Grade II* listed building for its architectural and historic significance.

To mark the centenary of the First World War, the memorial garden was permanently safeguarded through Fields in Trust, in partnership with the Royal British Legion, to guarantee its role as both a community recreational space and a lasting tribute to those who served.

== Design ==
The memorial is a neoclassical composition constructed in Portland stone. It stands on a three-tier stepped platform and features a tall square shaft supported on a pedestal with a moulded plinth. The shaft is decorated with pedimented pilasters, stylised palm-leaf friezes, and fluted detailing.

Flanking the pedestal wings are two bronze lions: one shown in combat with a serpent and the other with a serpent beneath its feet. At the summit is a sculptural group portraying Winged Victory (Note: Other sources describe the figure as Peace.) supporting a collapsed soldier. Victory clasps the soldier's wrist as he raises an inverted sword of honour and holds a laurel wreath.

Surrounding the figures is an assemblage of weaponry and equipment representing the three armed forces, including an aircraft propeller (Royal Air Force), ropes and an anchor (Royal Navy), and a tank gear-wheel, artillery guns, rifles, and steel helmets (British Army).

On the front and rear faces of the shaft are bronze fittings in the form of stylised Roman standards, each incorporating a wreath and five horizontal bands inscribed with the names of theatres of war. The south face lists Belgium, France, Gallipoli, Egypt, and Italy, while the north face lists Mesopotamia, Africa, Turkey, Macedonia, and Russia.

The main pedestal's south face carries a large bronze panel with a bead-and-reel border and raised lettering reading:

ERECTED IN HONOUR OF THE MEN OF
ASHTON-UNDER-LYNE AND DISTRICT
WHO FOUGHT FOR KING AND EMPIRE IN
THE GREAT WAR, ESPECIALLY THOSE
WHO SACRIFICED THEIR LIVES AND
WHOSE NAMES ARE RECORDED HEREON
1914–1919

A smaller panel beneath records the dates "1939–1945".

To either side and across the rear are 38 bronze panels bearing the names of the First World War dead in relief lettering, each panel listing 40 names. The east and west return faces each contain a bronze panel commemorating those who died during the Second World War, totalling 301 names.

== Gallery ==
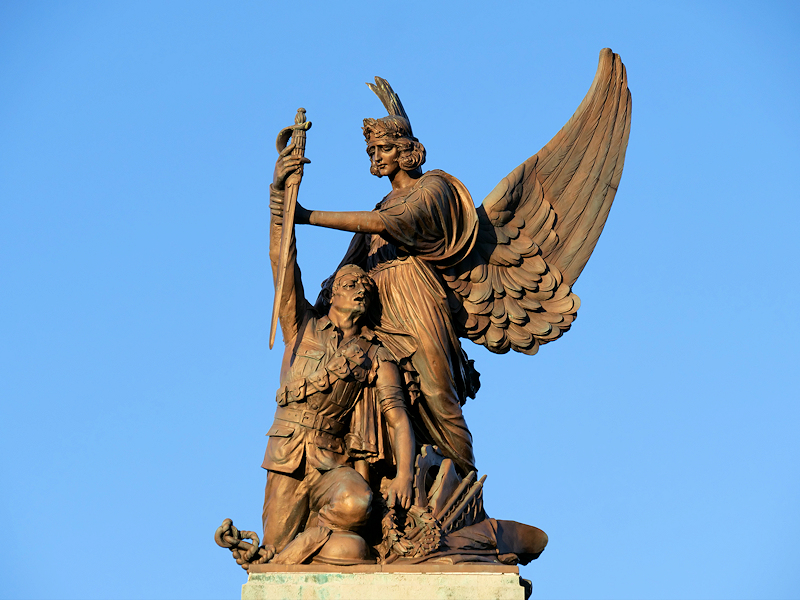
Soldier and Victory

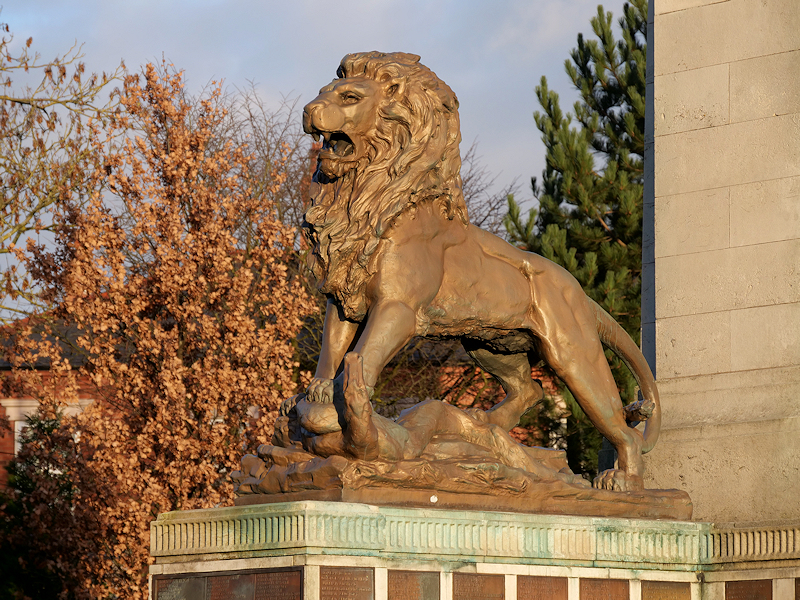
Lion and serpent

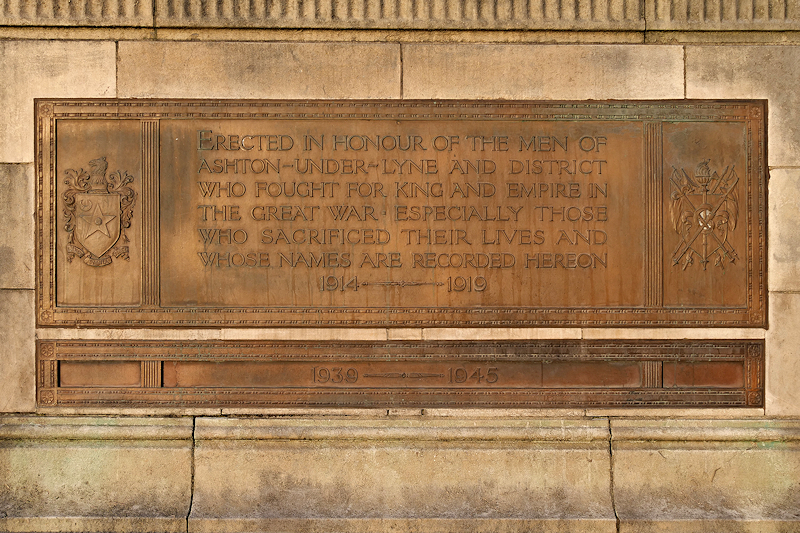
Bronze dedication panel

== See also ==
- Grade II* listed buildings in Greater Manchester
- Listed buildings in Ashton-under-Lyne
