= Ramping arch =

Architectural feature

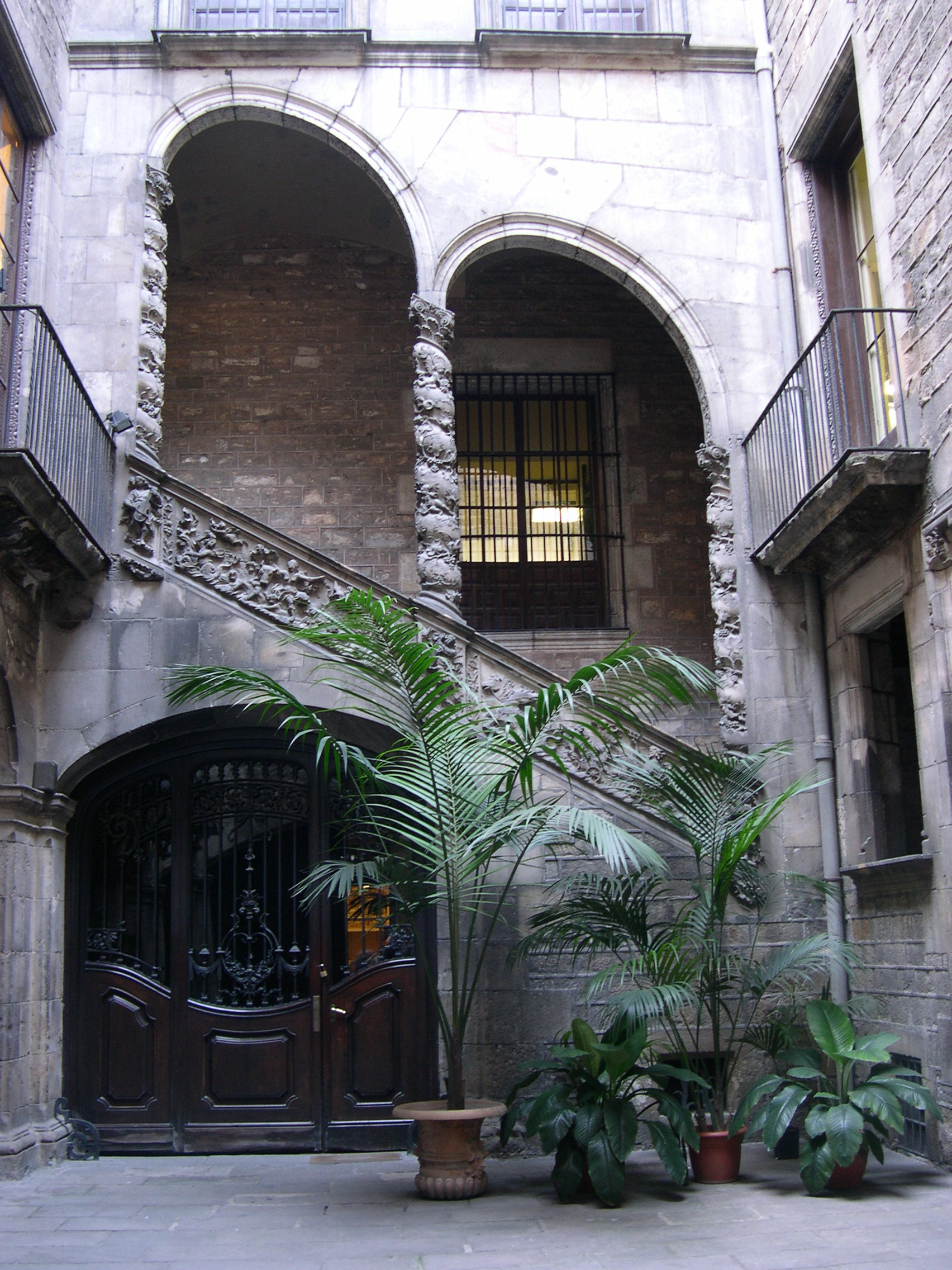
Ramping arches at Palau Dalmases in Barcelona

The ramping arch (also known as rampant arch, from French: arc rampant, and raking arch) is an asymmetrical arch that has its springers located at substantially different heights. Frequently a ramping arch is associated with a ramp or stairs.

Originally used to support inclined structures, like stairs or ramps, in the 13th-14th centuries the rampant arch appeared as parts of flying buttresses used to counteract the thrust of Gothic ribbed vaults, typical design was based on a truncated semicircular arch. Viollet-le-Duc in 1854 described two arch types in buttresses: the earlier one where the center of the intrados segment is located on the face of the wall (intrados close to a quarter-circle), and the later, more efficient, design where the center is moved inside the wall, narrowing the segment. The main purpose of a buttress is to relay the thrust to the foundations, the structure also accommodates the downspouts. A typical flying buttress used a single-arch arrangement, although two-tiered arches and even three-tiered designs were used.

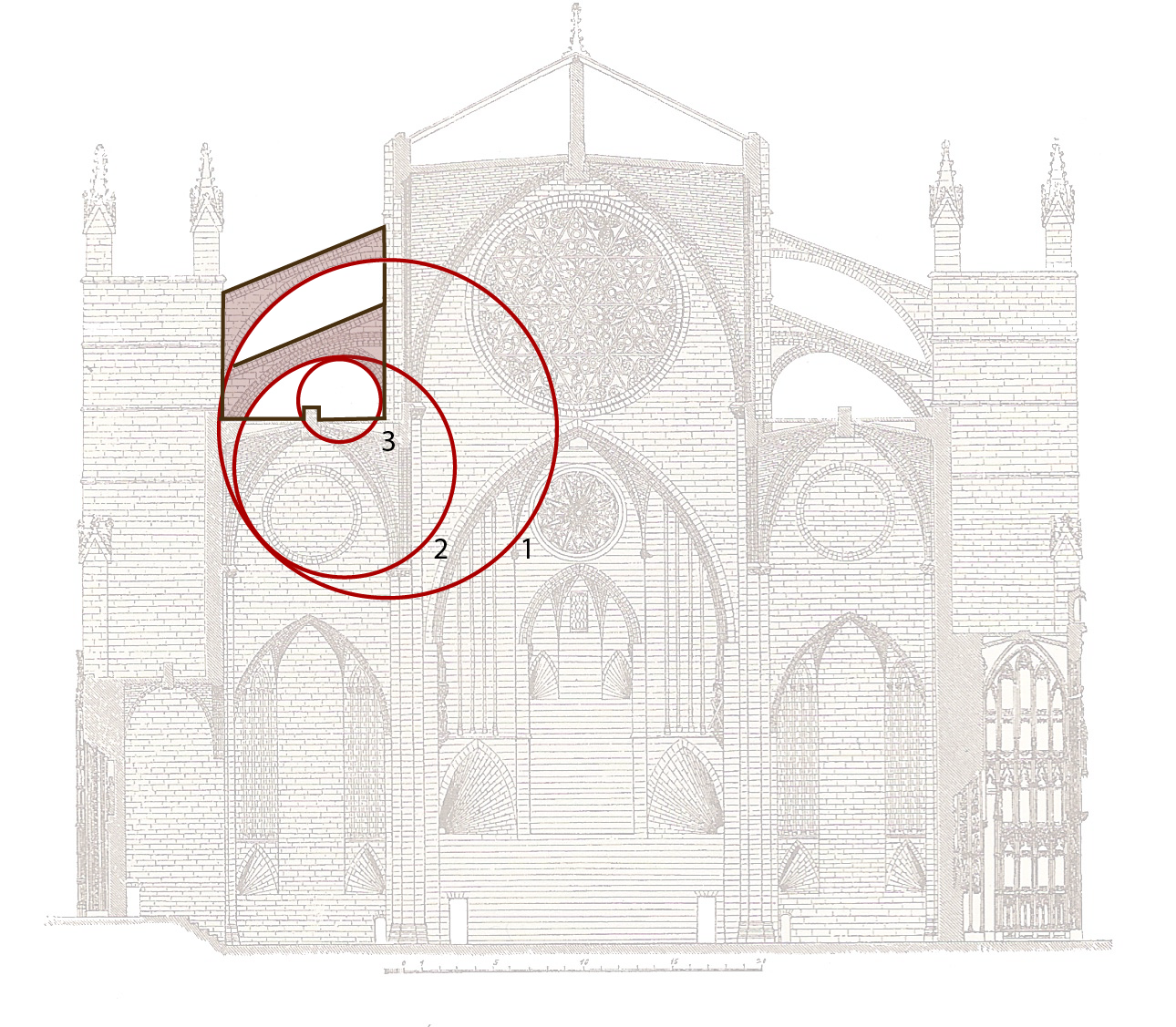
Ramping arch segments

The ramping arches can consist of a single circle segment (typical for flying buttresses of large cathedrals) or from two segments with different centers and radii connected at the keystone.

== History ==
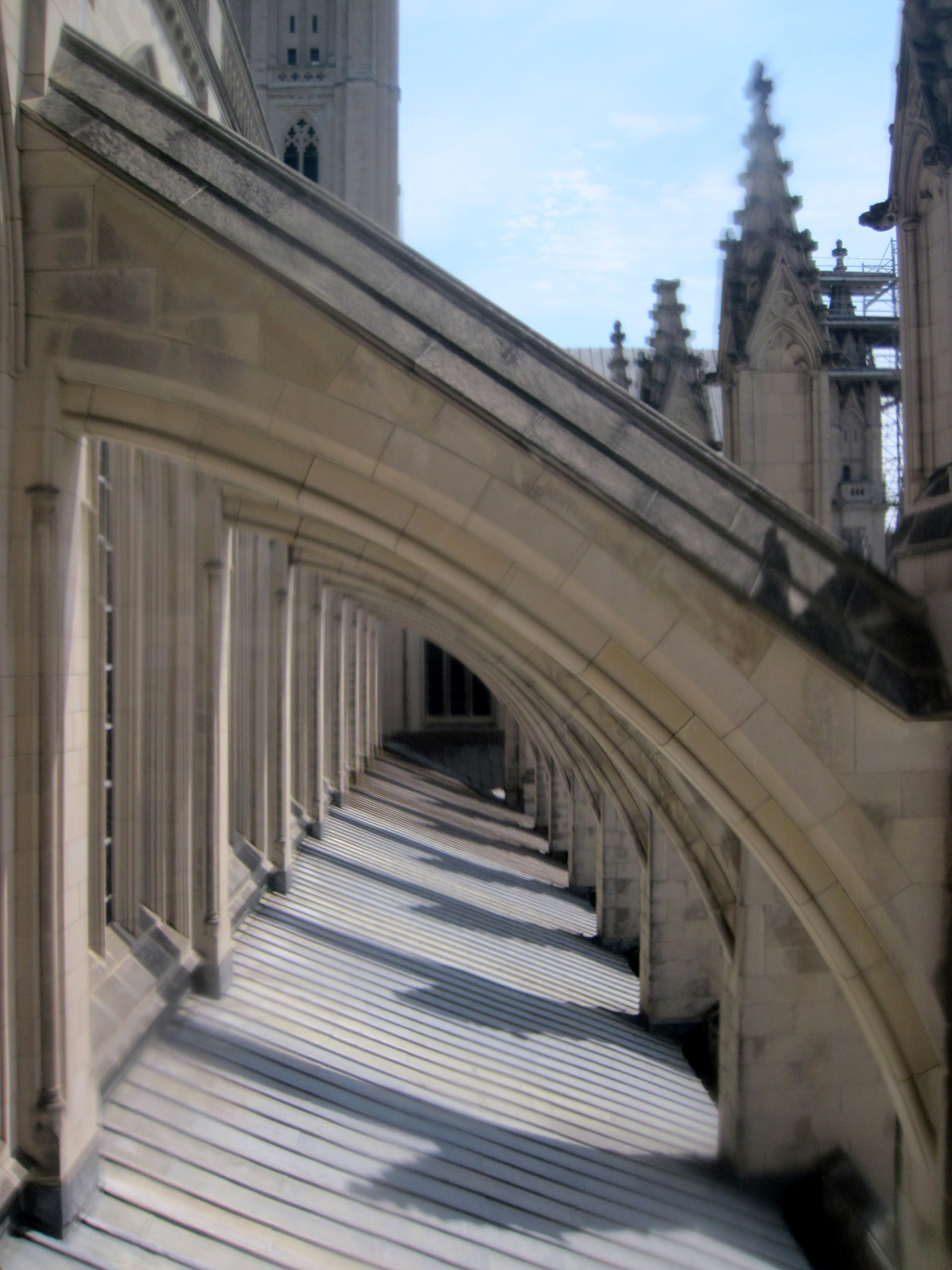
Ramping arches in the flying buttresses of the Washington National Cathedral

The ramping arches appeared in flying-buttress-like constructs outside the main walls for the first time c. 1100 AD (Durham Cathedral). The arches were not yet used to relieve the thrust of the vault, but provided support for the roof over the triforium. The need to buttress the walls to counteract the thrust was recognized when the Romanesque architecture barrel vaults began cracking up with time. At first, wooden frameworks were added outside the walls, later replaced by masonry, probably the first place to do so was the Abbey of Vezelay (12th century). The ramping arches played a major role in the Gothic architecture, as their use in buttresses allowed to lighten the walls and use large windows, significantly improving the lighting inside the Gothic churches in comparison to the Romanesque ones.

The ramping arches became popular again in the neo-Gothic architecture of the late 19th century.

== Sources ==
- Curl, James Stevens; Wilson, Susan (2021). "ramping". The Oxford dictionary of architecture: over 5000 entries (4th ed.). Oxford: Oxford University Press. ISBN 978-0-19-191874-2.
- Davies, N.; Jokiniemi, E. (2008). Dictionary of Architecture and Building Construction. Taylor & Francis. ISBN 978-1-136-41025-3.
- Gorse, Christopher A.; Johnston, David; Pritchard, Martin (2020). "rampant arch". A Dictionary of Construction, Surveying, and Civil Engineering (2nd ed.). Oxford: Oxford University Press. ISBN 978-0-19-187106-1.
- Velilla, Cristina; Alcayde, Alfredo; San-Antonio-Gómez, Carlos; Montoya, Francisco G.; Zavala, Ignacio; Manzano-Agugliaro, Francisco (2019-05-03). "Rampant Arch and Its Optimum Geometrical Generation". Symmetry. 11 (5): 627. doi:10.3390/sym11050627. hdl:10835/7559. ISSN 2073-8994.
- Woodman, Francis; Bloom, Jonathan M. (2003). "Arch". Oxford Art Online. Oxford University Press. doi:10.1093/gao/9781884446054.article.t003657. ISBN 978-1-884446-05-4.
