= John Ashton Floyd =

English sculptor

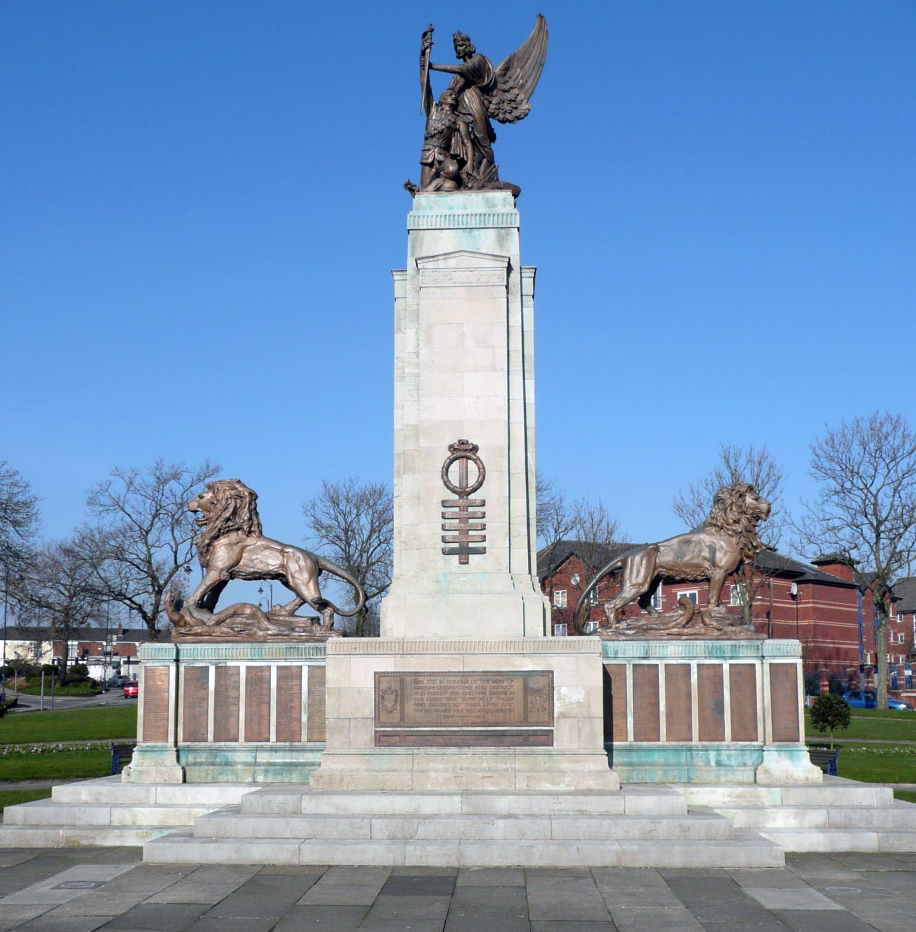
Ashton-under-Lyne War Memorial, statues for which were created by Floyd.

John Ashton Floyd was a sculptor based in Manchester, England, in the inter-war years of the 20th century, who created a number of notable works.

== Works ==
John Floyd's work includes sculptures in the Grade II* listed 100 King Street building in Manchester, commissioned by Edwin Lutyens. Between 1919 and 1922 he created the sculpted wounded soldier and the figure of Winged Victory, who is taking the sword of honour from the soldier's hand, for the main Ashton-under-Lyne War Memorial. He was also responsible for the 1921 Royton War Memorial on Tandle Hill near Oldham.

He was, for a time, an assistant to John Cassidy, an Irish sculptor and painter who settled in Manchester. Floyd later created a sculpture forming the Manchester Post Office peace memorial—unveiled in 1929—in Cassidy's Plymouth Grove studio.
