= St Michael and All Angels' Church, Ashton-under-Lyne =

Church in Tameside, Greater Manchester, England

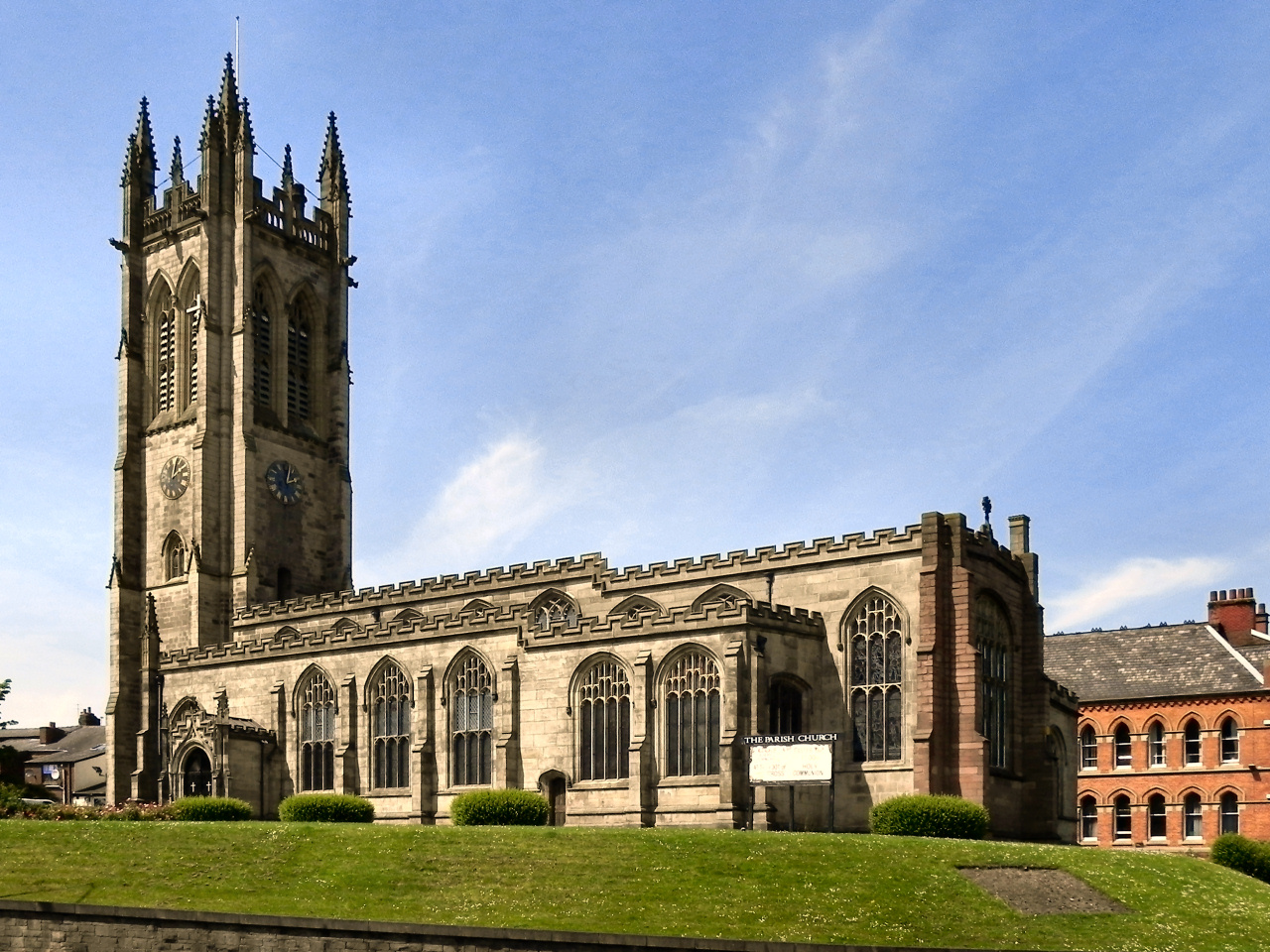
- St Michael and All Angels' Church, 2011

- Location within Greater Manchester

Religion
- Affiliation: Anglican
- District: Diocese of Manchester
- Ecclesiastical or organizational status: Parish church

Location
- Location: Ashton-under-Lyne, Greater Manchester, England
- Interactive map of St Michael and All Angels' Church, Ashton-under-Lyne
- Coordinates: 53.487675°N 2.089699°W

Architecture
- Type: Church
- Style: Gothic

Specifications
- Spire: 1
- Spire height: 139ft 6in
- Materials: Sandstone, stone-slate roof

St. Michael's Church (also known as, St. Michael and All Angels' Church) is an Anglican parish church in Ashton-under-Lyne, Tameside, Greater Manchester, England. The church is a Grade I Listed Building. The church dates back to at least 1262, and a church on the site was mentioned in the Domesday Book. The church was rebuilt in the fifteenth century; however little of the previous church remains after it was rebuilt again in the nineteenth century and is still an active place of worship.

== History ==
St Michael's church may have been one of the two churches in the barony of Manchester which were mentioned in the Domesday Book, 1086. It was certainly in existence by 1262 when the advowson was held by the lord of the manor of Manchester. There is some uncertainty about the dedication: it is sometimes referred to as St Helen's but it is unclear whether the series of stained glass windows devoted to St Helen is the source of confusion. Rebuilding was undertaken in the 15th century (according to tradition in 1413) by Sir John Assheton who then held the advowson. His great-grandson Sir Thomas (died 1516) gave much of the surviving glass and left money to rebuild the tower. In 1792 after storm damage the interior was pewed and the screen and rood were removed. In 1821 the north side was rebuilt and in 1841 the south wall was also rebuilt. Richard Tattersall did restoration work in 1843 and 1843–45 to the interior piers and the carved oak pews and galleries. In the late 19th century the tower was rebuilt by J. S. Crowther. The only remains of the 15th century church are now the base of the north wall, the arcades, the chancel arch and the ceiling.

== Description ==
The tower built in 1886-88 is modelled on the tower of Manchester Cathedral. The south porch is a fairly close restoration of the earlier porch shown in a view of 1765. There was formerly a family chapel of the earls of Stamford at the east end of the south aisle; this was formerly an Assheton chantry chapel. The two storey Stamford family pew (1841) now occupies its position. The north porch is a memorial of the 1st World War designed by R. B. Preston & R. Martin, 1921. The north vestry is a former chantry chapel of the Lees / Leech family.

The box pews are arranged to face the three-decker pulpit so that some of them have their backs to the chancel. The three galleries may be 18th-century and are supported by cast iron columns. There are three fonts: two are Victorian and the other is 18th-century. The stained glass includes the most important medieval stained glass in Northwest England. It was given in 1497-1512 by Sir Thomas Assheton and the life of St Helen is portrayed in 20 windows as well as the Assheton donors. In 1872 these windows were moved to the south aisle. There are monuments to John Postlethwaite (died 1818) which includes Masonic symbols, and of Edward Brown (died 1857).

Note: While the windows with life of St. Helena might have been donated after 1497, several ladies within it wear hennin. That suggests the design originates from 1480s, over a decade before it was donated/delivered.

== See also ==
- Grade I listed churches in Greater Manchester
- Listed buildings in Ashton-under-Lyne
- List of churches in Greater Manchester
