= Chatterton, Lancashire =

Village in Lancashire, England

Coordinates: 53.661°N 2.319°W

Chatterton
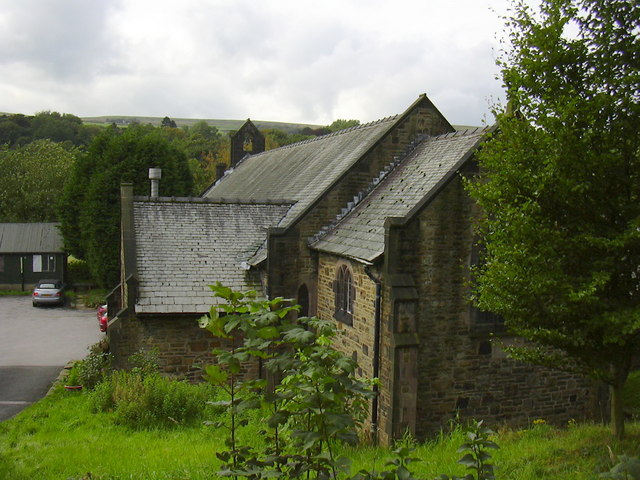
- St. Philip's Church in 2008

- Location within Rossendale Location within Lancashire
- OS grid reference: SD790184
- District: Rossendale
- Shire county: Lancashire
- Region: North West
- Country: England
- Sovereign state: United Kingdom
- Post town: BURY
- Postcode district: BL0
- Dialling code: 01706
- Police: Lancashire
- Fire: Lancashire
- Ambulance: North West
- UK Parliament: Rossendale and Darwen

Chatterton is a small village within the southern part of the Rossendale Valley in the Rossendale borough of Lancashire, England.

It is half a mile north of Ramsbottom town centre on the A676 between Bolton and Edenfield. For local government purposes, it receives services from Rossendale Borough Council and Lancashire County Council. Nearby are the village of Stubbins and the hamlet of Strongstry. Running alongside the village separating it from Strongstry is the River Irwell.

Much of the land to the west of the village is in the care of the National Trust and consists of hillside pasture and woodland leading up to Holcombe Moor and Peel Monument.

Parkland at Chatterton was given to the people of the district of Ramsbottom as a peace memorial by the Porritt family.

== Toponymy ==
Like Catterton in North Yorkshire and Chadderton near Oldham, the name Chatterton is formed from the Brittonic cadeir, meaning "chair, throne" (Welsh cadair, see Blencathra and Catterlen in Cumbria), suffixed with Old English –tūn, "farm".

== Lancashire machine-breaking riots ==
On 26 April 1826, rioting Luddites were read the Riot Act at Chatterton by the 60th Rifle Corps (later to become known as the King's Royal Rifle Corps). Ignoring the reading of the act, the mob attempted to destroy looms at Aitken and Lord's factory whereupon the soldiers eventually opened fire, killing 4 men and wounding many others.
