= Strongstry =

Coordinates: 53.665°N 2.317°W

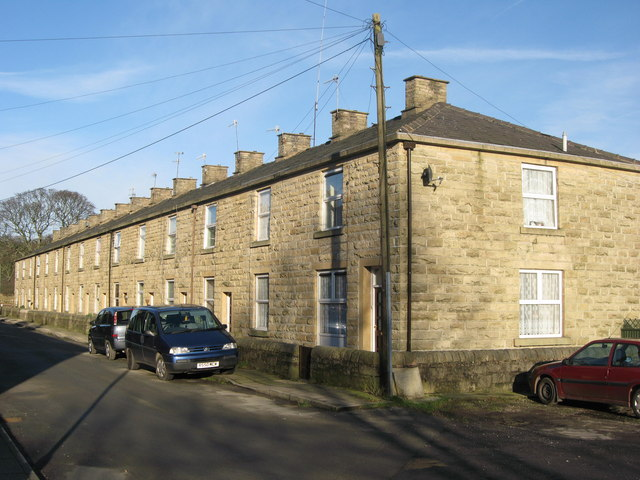
- North Street in 2007

- Location within Rossendale Location within Lancashire
- OS grid reference: SD790187
- District: Rossendale
- Shire county: Lancashire
- Region: North West
- Country: England
- Sovereign state: United Kingdom
- Post town: BURY
- Postcode district: BL0
- Dialling code: 01706
- Police: Lancashire
- Fire: Lancashire
- Ambulance: North West
- UK Parliament: Rossendale and Darwen

Strongstry is a hamlet in Rossendale, Lancashire, England. The hamlet is only accessible by an unadopted road running through a factory. It is accessible on several walking routes. For local government purposes, it receives services from Rossendale Borough Council and Lancashire County Council. Nearby are the village of Stubbins and the hamlet of Chatterton. The East Lancashire Railway runs through Strongstry, but there is no station there.

Much of the land to the west of the village is in the care of the National Trust and consists of hillside pasture and woodland leading up to Holcombe Moor and Peel Tower.
