= Newton Reigny =

Village in Cumbria, England

Coordinates: 54.676°N 2.809°W

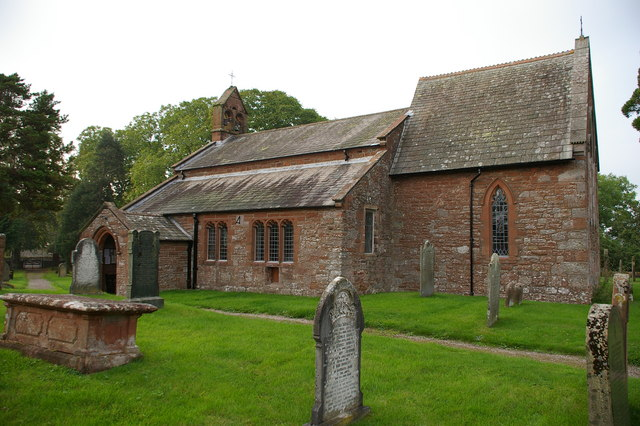
- The Parish Church of St. John, Newton Reigny

- Location in Eden, Cumbria Location within Cumbria
- OS grid reference: NY478315
- Civil parish: Catterlen
- Unitary authority: Westmorland and Furness
- Ceremonial county: Cumbria
- Region: North West
- Country: England
- Sovereign state: United Kingdom
- Post town: PENRITH
- Postcode district: CA11
- Dialling code: 01768
- Police: Cumbria
- Fire: Cumbria
- Ambulance: North West
- UK Parliament: Penrith and Solway

Newton Reigny is a village and former civil parish, now in the parish of Catterlen, in Westmorland and Furness, in the English county of Cumbria, near the town of Penrith. In 1931 the parish had a population of 168.

== History ==
"'New tūn'...This was held in 1185...by William de Reigni." Therefore, 'new village' (from the Old English), 'held by Reigny'.

On 1 April 1934 the parish was abolished and merged with Catterlen.

== See also ==
- Listed buildings in Catterlen
