= Listed buildings in Catterlen =

Catterlen is a civil parish in Westmorland and Furness, Cumbria, England. It contains seven buildings that are recorded in the National Heritage List for England. Of these, one is listed at Grade I, the highest of the three grades, one is at Grade II*, the middle grade, and the others are at Grade II, the lowest grade. The parish contains the village of Newton Reigny and is otherwise rural. The listed buildings comprise a tower house and associated structures, a church, a house, farmhouses and farm buildings.

== Key ==
Grade	Criteria
I	Buildings of exceptional interest, sometimes considered to be internationally important
II*	Particularly important buildings of more than special interest
II	Buildings of national importance and special interest

== Buildings ==
Name and location	Photograph	Date	Notes	Grade
St John's Church; 54.67674°N 2.80821°W		Late 12th century	The church was restored in 1876 by Ewan Christian. It is in sandstone and has a green slate roof with coped gables. The church consists of a nave, north and south aisles with a south porch, and a chancel with a north vestry. On the west gable is a twin open bellcote.	II*
Catterlen Hall; 54.68091°N 2.81102°W		Early 15th century	A fortified tower house, to which a hall range was added in 1577, followed by a wing projecting from the south end towards the east in 1657, giving the building an L-shaped plan. It is built in sandstone with green slate roofs. The tower is on a boulder plinth, and has a battlemented parapet. The hall range has two storeys and six bays, and the extension has two bays. The hall range has a Tudor arched doorway and mullioned windows. In the extension, steps lead up to a first-floor doorway with an alternate-block surround, a panel with a coat of arms, and pediments. Inside the hall is an inglenook. The tower house is also a Scheduled Monument.	I
Espland House; 54.67768°N 2.81006°W	—	1731	The house was extended to the right in the 19th century; both parts have a Welsh slate roof. The original house is roughcast, it has two storeys and two bays, a doorway with a dated lintel, and two-light mullioned windows with chamfered surrounds. The extension is higher, it is in sandstone with quoins, and has two storeys and three bays. The doorway and the windows, which are sashes, have raised stone surrounds.	II
Low Dyke; 54.69490°N 2.79669°W	—	Late 18th century	A sandstone farmhouse with quoins, a string course, and a green slate roof. There are two storeys and three bays, a rear outshut, a doorway with a stone surround and a fanlight, and sash windows, also in stone surrounds. In the right return is a round-headed stair window, and pigeon holes in the gable.	II
Bankfoot and stables 54.67892°N 2.81066°W	—	Late 18th or early 19th century	The farmhouse and stables are roughcast with green slate roofs. The house has quoins, two storeys, and three bays. In the centre is a round-headed doorway with a pilastered surround and a traceried fanlight, and the windows are sashes in stone surrounds. The stables to the left is lower with two storeys and three bays. It contains two doors, casement windows, and a loft door.	II
Barn, Catterlen Hall; 54.68124°N 2.81053°W	—	Early 19th century	A sandstone barn on a chamfered plinth with quoins and a green slate roof, and four bays. On the side facing the hall are two-light windows and small square vents, and at the rear is a projecting cart entrance, doors and loft doors.	II
Wall and footbridge, Catterlen Hall; 54.68111°N 2.81062°W	—	1856	The wall was built to retain the garden terrace, and the footbridge to give access to the hall from the farm buildings on the other side of the road. They are in sandstone, and the footbridge consists of a single pointed arch with solid parapets.	II
