= Pilgrims' Cross, Holcombe Moor =

Monument marking the site of a wayside cross

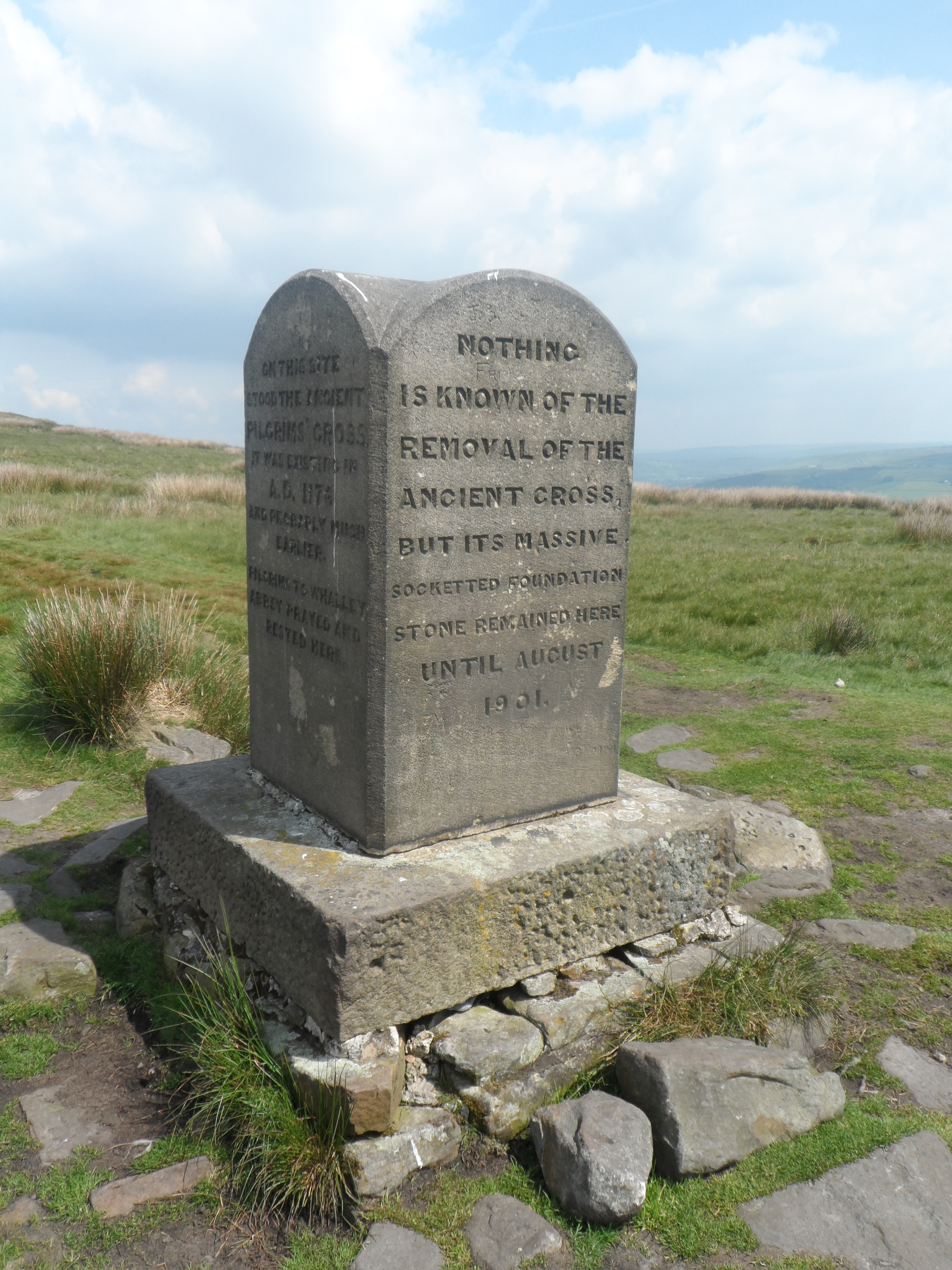
- Location: Holcombe Moor near Ramsbottom
- Coordinates: 53.6598°N 2.3469°W
- Beginning date: 12th century as a wayside cross
- Restored date: Replaced in 1902 with an inscribed stone

Pilgrims' Cross, Holcombe Moor, also called Whowell's Cross and Chatterton's Cross, is located on Holcombe Moor near Ramsbottom and Holcombe, Greater Manchester, England. It marks the site of a 12th-century stone wayside cross, originally placed for the use of travellers, for prayer and as a guide post.

== Description ==
Known locally as the Pilgrims' Cross, the current monument dates from 1902, marking the site of an ancient cross that is recorded as standing in 1176, and possibly earlier. It is located on Holcombe Moor above Bury, not far from the Peel Monument and on the edge of a Ministry of Defence Danger Area. It is "on the western side of the Irwell valley [where the land] rises to a height of over 1,200 feet (370 metres) above the sea. Anciently [the moor] formed part of the forest or chase of Tottington, belonging to the Earl of Lancaster and afterwards to the Lacies, earls of Lincoln". Monuments on high moorland such as Pilgrims' Cross served as guide posts for travellers, to tell them how far they had travelled and to aid orientation in bad weather.

== History ==
Whitaker (1801) says that the existence of the Pilgrims' Cross, as mentioned in 1225, indicated the route of pilgrims travelling from the north of England to Walsingham and Canterbury. Land in Holcombe Forest was left in that year to Bretton Priory, including "three acres of meadow near Pilgrims' Cross Shaw ... a resting place of the pilgrims". He also mentions the Plantaganets and Lacys, who travelled via the monument's location to Lancaster, from their castles in Clitheroe and Pontefract. "What trains of sumpter horses must upon these occasions have been seen traversing these boggy wastes, impassable at that time for carriages. This was the line the Lacys were condemned to pursue".

Before destruction, the ancient cross was called variously Whowell's Cross and Chatterton's Cross. The Lancashire Evening Post suggested that, "The cross itself was believed to have been broken by drunken quarrymen generations before [the base stone was destroyed]". What little is known of the history of the Pilgrims' Cross is inscribed on the stone monument itself which was erected on 24 May 1902 after the original socket was destroyed "by vandals" in 1901. A letter from the Reverend Henry Dowsett to the Manchester Evening News was published on 24 August of the same year: (Note: Author Henry Dowsett (1839 –10 January 1917), ordained at Peterborough Cathedral, rector of Emmanuel Church, Holcombe 1872–1905. His books on Holcombe were Notes on Holcombe (1901) and Holcombe Long Ago (1902). He is memorialised inside the church, and buried in the churchyard.)

The Rector of Holcombe ... writes that the massive foundation, all that remained of the ancient Pilgrims' cross stone on Holcombe Hill, has recently been destroyed. The stone was seen alright three weeks ago, but now it has been broken up.. The cross was close to the ancient moorland footpath, and is mentioned as far back as 1225. It was probably in position on Holcombe Hill at a much earlier date.

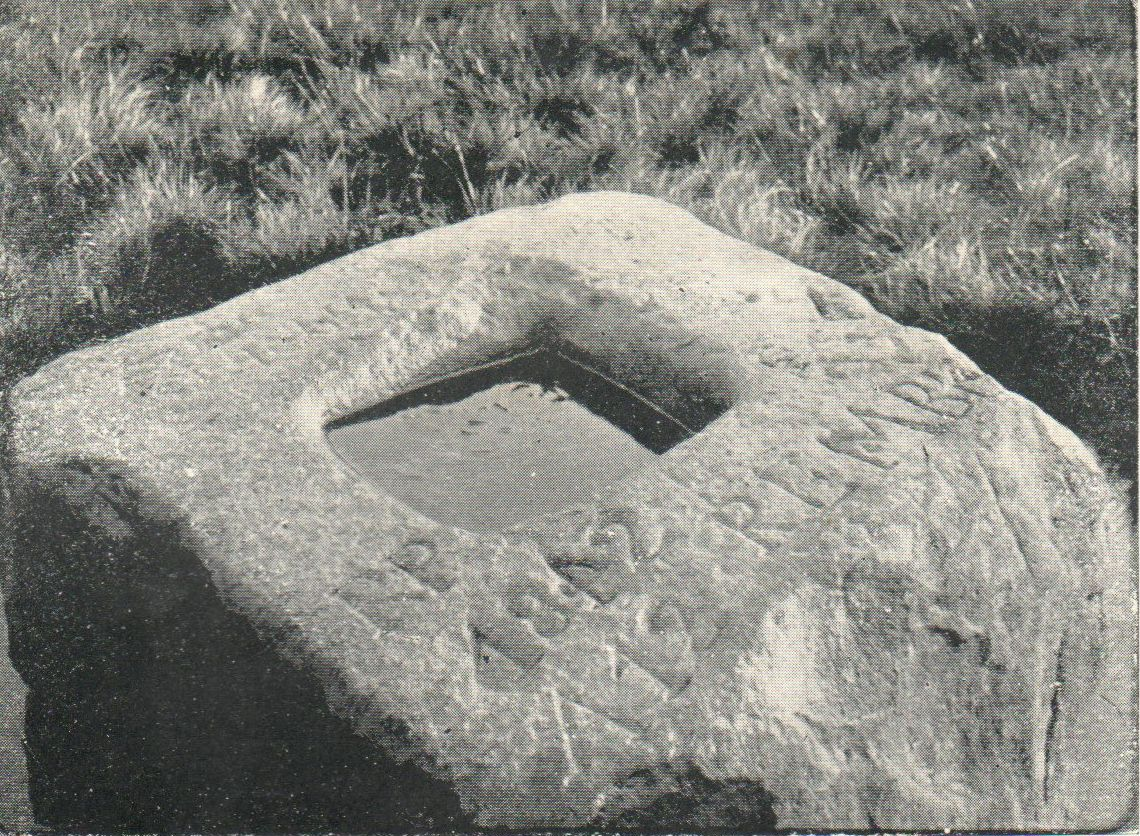
The original foundation stone of the Pilgrim's Cross

On 7 September 1901, Dowsett provided the Manchester City News with further information about the foundation stone.

The stone was a block of sandstone, weighing perhaps a ton, and showing the cavity squared for the shaft almost as well cut as when it left the mason's hands 700 years ago. There was only just a little weathering of the angles. A simple block of sandstone ... now it lies in fragments ... scattered here and there ... The stone was not a quarried one. It belonged to that class found upon our hillsides here, among glacial drift and moraine matter. It was of rather a finer grain than the stone now being quarried on our moor ... Our Pilgrims' Cross stone had been dressed and squared by the mason's hand, though a little roughly so here and there.

On 30 August 1901, the Heywood Advertiser added more about the destruction, saying that the Pilgrims' Cross foundation stone had been "broken into fragments and pieces thrown into a boghole and covered with whinberry roots". By 1903 the identity of the vandals was still unknown. The Manchester City News said:

Its demolition is an act of pure vandalism, for which one can find no excuse, and for which it is difficult even to suggest a motive. It appears to have been carried out by clumsy depredators. Wedges had been inserted in the block.The wedge holes were badly made, and other marks show the unskilful use of heavy hammers. The destruction was evidently committed on the site, and the broken fragments were afterwards carried to the wet boghole, twenty yards distant, in which they were found. Unfortunately they are too numerous, there being at least fifty, for any hope to be entertained of the stone being pieced together again and replaced in its old site.

=== Inscription ===
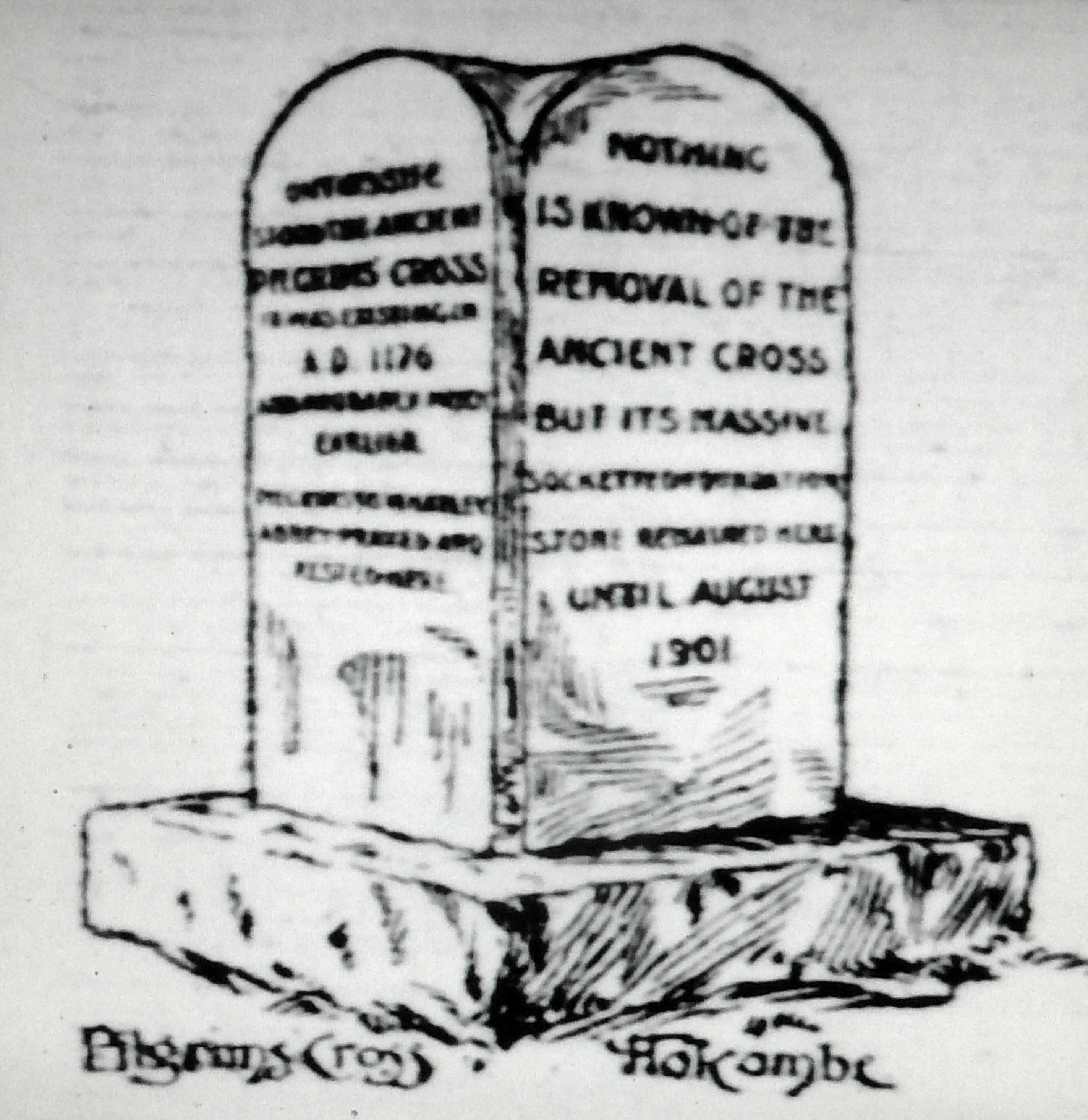
Pilgrim's Cross, in 1910

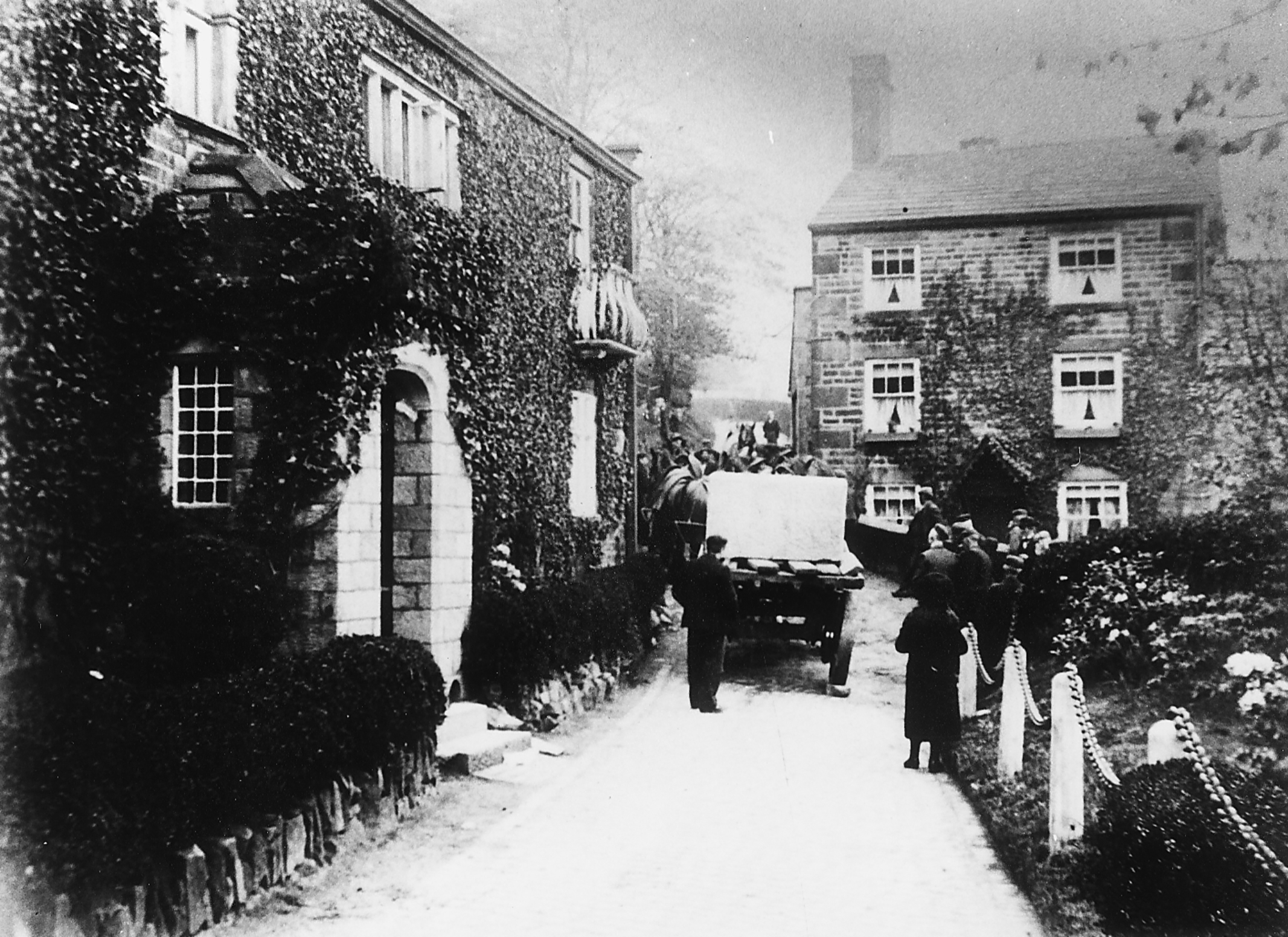
The memorial monument being carried through Holcombe on 24 May 1902

On this site stood the ancient Pilgrims Cross. It was standing in A.D. 1176 and probably much earlier. Pilgrims to Whalley Abbey prayed and rested here.

In A.D. 1176 and in A.D. 1225 the Pilgrims Cross is named in charters of gifts of land in Holcombe forest. In A.D. 1662 King Charles II gave this manor to General Monk, Duke of Abermarle through whom it has descended to the present lord of the manor.

Nothing is known of the removal of the ancient cross, but its massive socketed foundation remained here until August 1901.

This memorial stone was placed here May 24th 1902 by the copyholders of the manor and others.

A local newspaper reported that "The stone [is] of huge proportions, and required the strength of fourteen horses to drag it up the hill" on Empire Day, Saturday 24 May 1902. The cart was pulled from Fletcher Bank Quarry at the other side of the Irwell Valley, "with much laborious effort". The monument is constructed of two Millstone Grit blocks, weighing in total roughly 6 long tons (6.1 tonnes). Henry Dowsett was "instrumental in the erection of the monument now on the site", and headed the fundraising committee. On 28 June 1902, Dowsett presided over the erection ceremony, which was attended by hundreds, including "prominent local gentlemen". The stone was funded by subscription. The inscription states that "Pilgrims to Whalley Abbey prayed and rested here", but Whalley Abbey was not founded until the late 13th century when the monks relocated from nearby Stanlow Abbey in April 1296. In fact, Rev. Henry Dowsett, who ordered the inscription on the stone, confirmed the cross pre-dated the abbey, minutes after dedicating the memorial monument in 1902. He said that:

The ancient cross was in existence long before Whalley Abbey was built. It would have been in existence probably 150 to two hundred years previously, at a time when Holcombe Moor was a forest and when people could hear the bark of the wolf and the scream of the falcon. Its purpose was to guide pilgrims to Whalley, and it had indicated the way to thousands of them.

== Later history ==
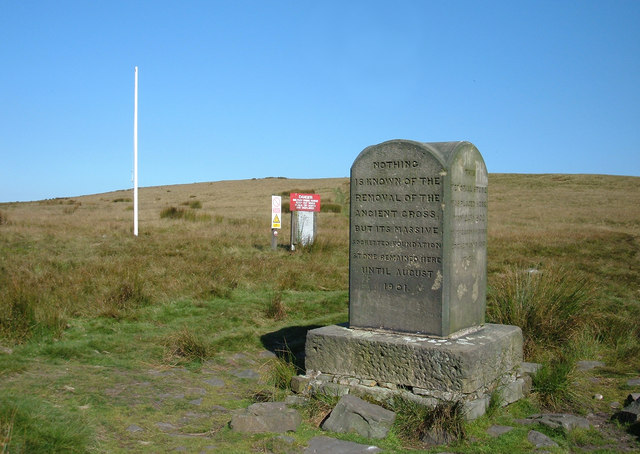
Pilgrims' Cross with firing range warning signs, 2007

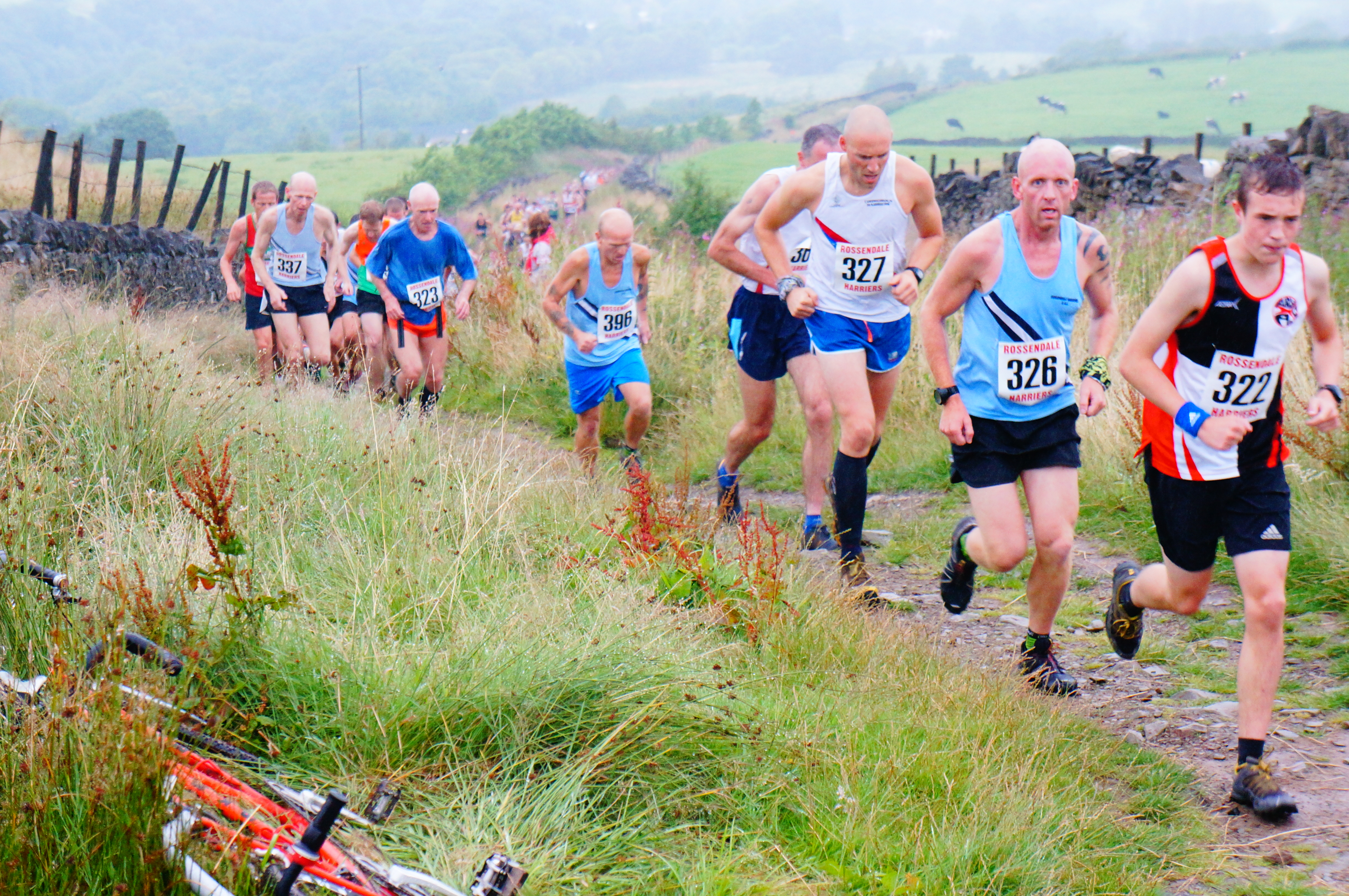
Pilgrims' Cross Fell Race 2013

In 1909 and 1910, the moorland which included the Pilgrims' Cross was at risk of enclosure, when the Territorial Army attempted to requisition it for a rifle range, and possibly "artillery work", in anticipation of imminent war in Europe. Local walkers and farmers were united in their objections to the scheme. The shooting range at Hawkshaw was initiated in 1916. By 1948, the land around the cross was being "used by the army", and in 1987 the army and hikers were still jostling for use of the land. As of 2024 there was still a firing range on Holcombe Moor.

On 6 February 1914, the body of cotton worker Reginald Geldard of Holcombe, aged around 36, was found lying in a pool of water 200 yards (180 m) from the Pilgrims' Cross, with a bullet wound in his head and a pistol in his hand. It was speculated that he may have been intimidated by the idea of a hospital operation.

In 1935 the monument collapsed, "apparently because of the mortar in the foundations perishing". The monument was restored by public subscription. In more recent times, the monument has been used as a landmark for hikers. For example, in 1991, a 7-mile (11 km) dog-walk for charity was organised between Holcombe Brook and the Pilgrims' Cross. In 1975 a group of Girl Guides used the landmark as an expeditionary focus for map-reading and the use of a compass. Local residents were put out when Ordnance Survey (OS) omitted the Pilgrims' Cross from its new Pathfinder map in 1992. However, the OS admitted its mistake and promised to "put it back in future publications". Pilgrims' Cross Fell Race is held annually. In 1993 there was a Pilgrims' Cross Fell Race for sixty competitors on a figure-of-eight route via Helmshore, Holcombe Moor and the monument.

== Bibliography ==
- Whitaker, Thomas Dunham (1801). History of the Original Parish of Whalley and Honour of Clitheroe, in the Counties of Lancaster and York. 2nd edition 1806, 3rd edition 1818; 4th edition (enlarged by John Gough Nichols and Ponsonby A. Lyons), 1872-6, 2 volumes This work used manuscripts of Thomas Lister Parker.
- Dowsett, Henry (1902). Notes on Holcombe (1 ed.). Manchester: John Heywood.
- Dowsett, Henry (1902). Holcombe Long Ago (1 ed.). Manchester: J. Heywood.
