= Catterlen =

Village and civil parish in Cumbria, England

Coordinates: 54.683333°N 2.816667°W

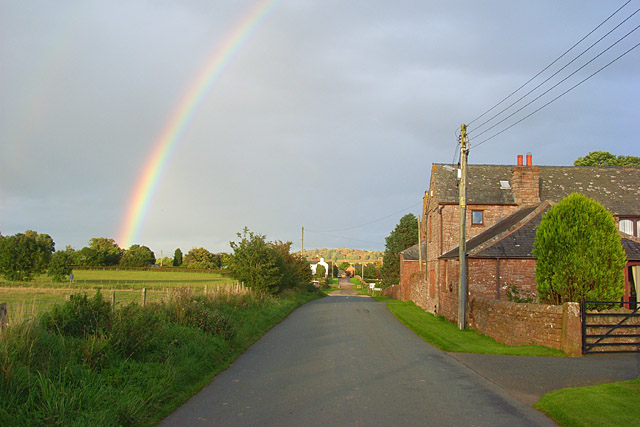
- Catterlen with rainbow

- Location within Cumbria
- Population: 605 (2011)
- OS grid reference: NY4833
- Civil parish: Catterlen
- Unitary authority: Westmorland and Furness
- Ceremonial county: Cumbria
- Region: North West
- Country: England
- Sovereign state: United Kingdom
- Post town: PENRITH
- Postcode district: CA11
- Dialling code: 01768
- Police: Cumbria
- Fire: Cumbria
- Ambulance: North West
- UK Parliament: Penrith and Solway

Catterlen is a small village and civil parish 3 miles (4.8 km) north west of Penrith, Cumbria. At the 2001 census the civil parish had a population of 471, increasing to 605 at the 2011 Census.

The village is a linear one with the B5305 road dividing it into two. Junction 41 of the M6 motorway is at Catterlen.

The parish of Catterlen also includes the slightly more populous village of Newton Reigny which was a separate parish from 1866 to 1934, previous to 1866 both villages were part of a larger Newton Reigny Parish.

The large house and former pele tower known as Catterlen Hall is closer to Newton Reigny than Catterlen.

Within the parish is Newton Rigg College, which was part of the Yorkshire-based Askham Bryan College.

Catterlen is within the historic county of Cumberland, but it is not governed by the modern unitary authority of Cumberland, being instead part of the Westmorland and Furness unitary authority area.

== Toponymy ==
The name Catterlen is Brittonic in origin. The first part of the name is the element cadeir, meaning "throne, chair" (see Chatterton and Chadderton in Lancashire, and Catterton in North Yorkshire). The second element in the name is lẹ:n, whose Welsh equivalent llwyn means "thicket (of small trees and bushes)".

== See also ==
- Listed buildings in Catterlen
