= Wayside cross =

Cross by a footpath, track or road

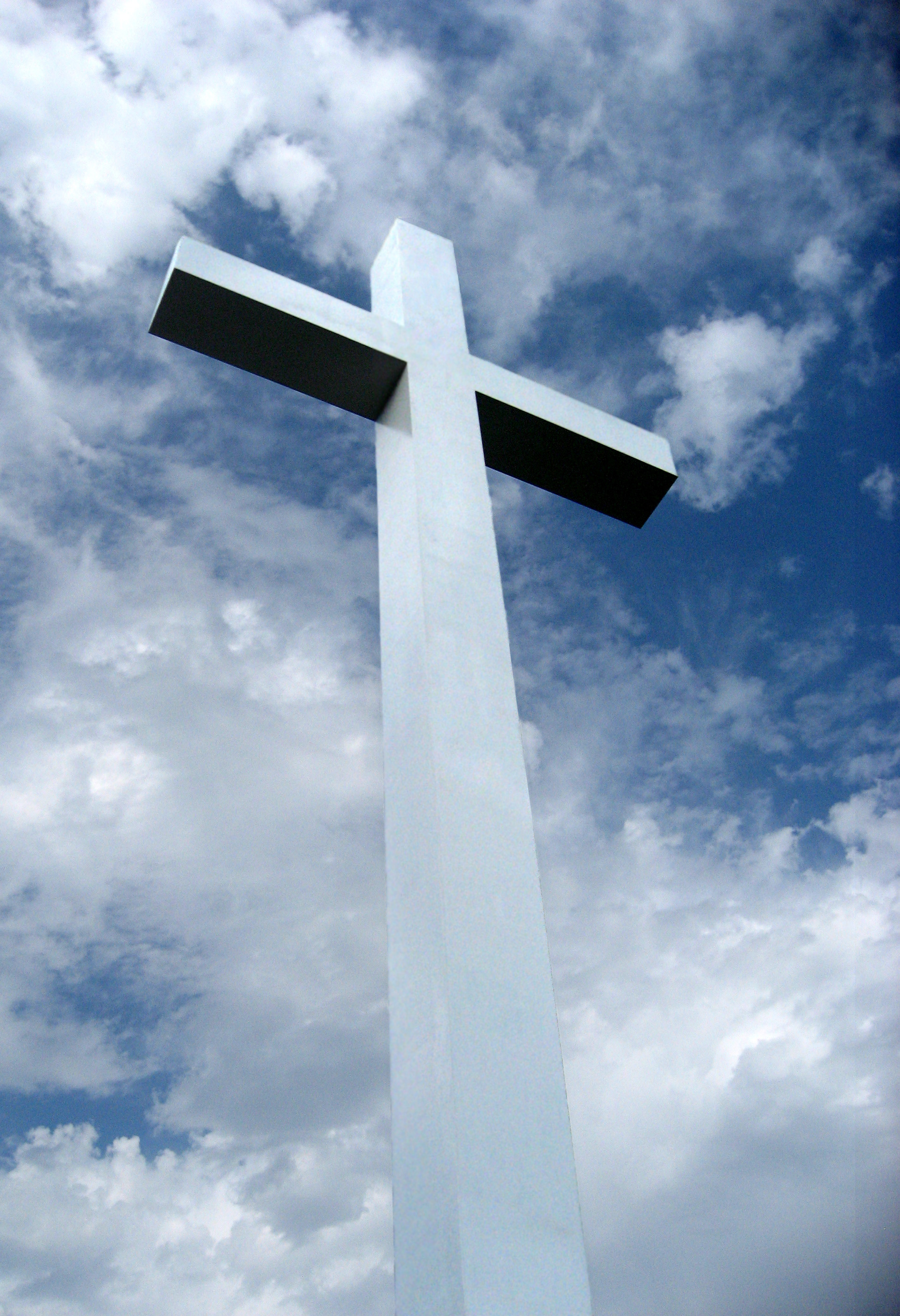
Sagemont Church Cross at the intersection of Beltway 8 and Interstate 45 in Houston, Texas, US. It was inaugurated in 2009 and measures 51.82 meters.

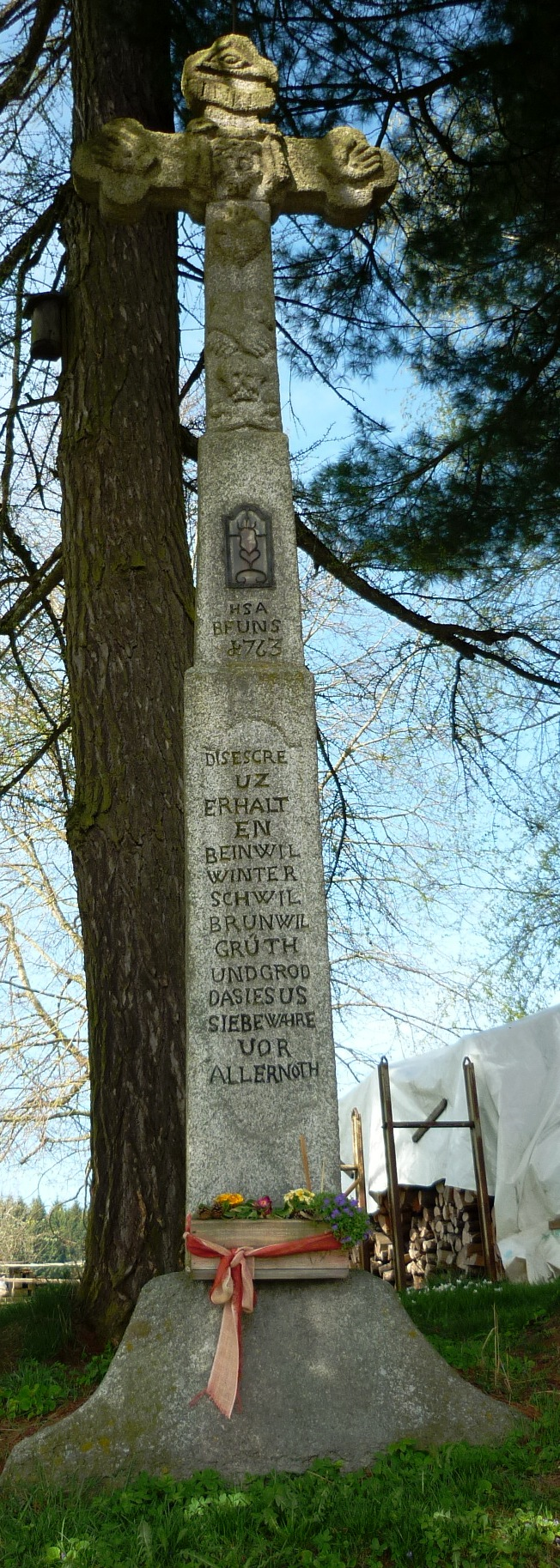
Wayside cross near Grod, Beinwil (Freiamt), Switzerland

A wayside cross is a cross by a footpath, track or road, at an intersection, along the edge of a field or in a forest. It can be made of wood, stone or metal. Stone crosses may also be conciliation crosses. Often they serve as waymarks for walkers and pilgrims or designate dangerous places.

== History ==
Wayside crosses were erected in Great Britain mostly in the 13ᵗʰC & 14ᵗʰC ≈1900 remains still exist today (see External Links). They also spread in the 17ᵗʰ century in Italy. Most of them were erected in previous centuries by the local population as a sign of their faith. Several of them were put up at places where an accident or a crime took place. The custom of placing an "accident cross" at spots on the roadside where people have been killed has, meanwhile, spread worldwide. Special forms of cross are the conciliation cross and the plague cross. Many wayside crosses, however, simply act as waymarks to indicate difficult or dangerous spots or to mark intersections. On walking maps, wayside crosses and shrines are displayed in order to aid orientation. On many crosses there is an inscription which may indicate why the cross was erected and by whom.

In some regions wayside crosses are mostly made of wood (e. g. in the Alps). They vary in size from small, inconspicuous crosses to great crosses hewn from stout beams. On many crosses, a skillfully carved figure of Jesus Christ is displayed. In many cases, when a wooden cross became rotten or dilapidated over the decades, it was restored or replaced with a new one on the same spot.

In many regions of Europe, wayside crosses are made of stone, and consequently last much longer. That said, many such stone crosses in the Rhineland region of Germany were lost during French occupation (1794–1814), because wayside crosses were banned in the wake of the strict secularisation that was imposed. Only a few crosses were able to be hidden by the local population and thus avoid destruction. Originally these stone crosses were short and stocky in shape and, with a height of about half a metre, considerably smaller than their wooden counterparts. In the 19th century (at least in the Rhineland) much larger stone crosses were put up.

By the North Loop of the Nürburgring racing circuit in Germany there was a centuries-old stone cross called the Schwedenkreuz ("Swedish Cross").

In 1594, the fortress city of Raab (present day Győr in Hungary) was recaptured from Ottoman Empire by Baron Adolf von Schwarzenberg. In commemoration, the Holy Roman Emperor Rudolf II decreed that crucifixes be set up on all the main roads and crossing points of the empire, bearing the inscription: "Praise and thanks to the Lord God". Some of those that survive in Austria and Germany are known as Raaberkreuze ("Raab cross") or Türkenkreuz ("Turk's cross").

In the UK a large number of medieval examples survive, rarely with a medieval cross, but often with an octagonal base and truncated or missing shaft. All are Grade II as listed buildings. They were used for travelers to pray at for a safe journey. There are two in Ashton Keynes, Wiltshire, one of which is beside the river Thames, presumably because it is a good route to Oxford and London. Two more medieval relics there are: a preaching cross and a central or market cross.

In Münsterland in north Germany, crosses called Hofkreuze ("farmyard crosses") may be found. They belong to farms and usually stand by a public right of way near the farm entrance. Votive crosses are erected by people in gratitude for being rescued from death, such as war, sickness, infection or other life-threatening danger. Other so-called "weather crosses" or "hail crosses" were set up to ward off natural disasters or extreme weather.

== Gallery ==
Ancient crosses

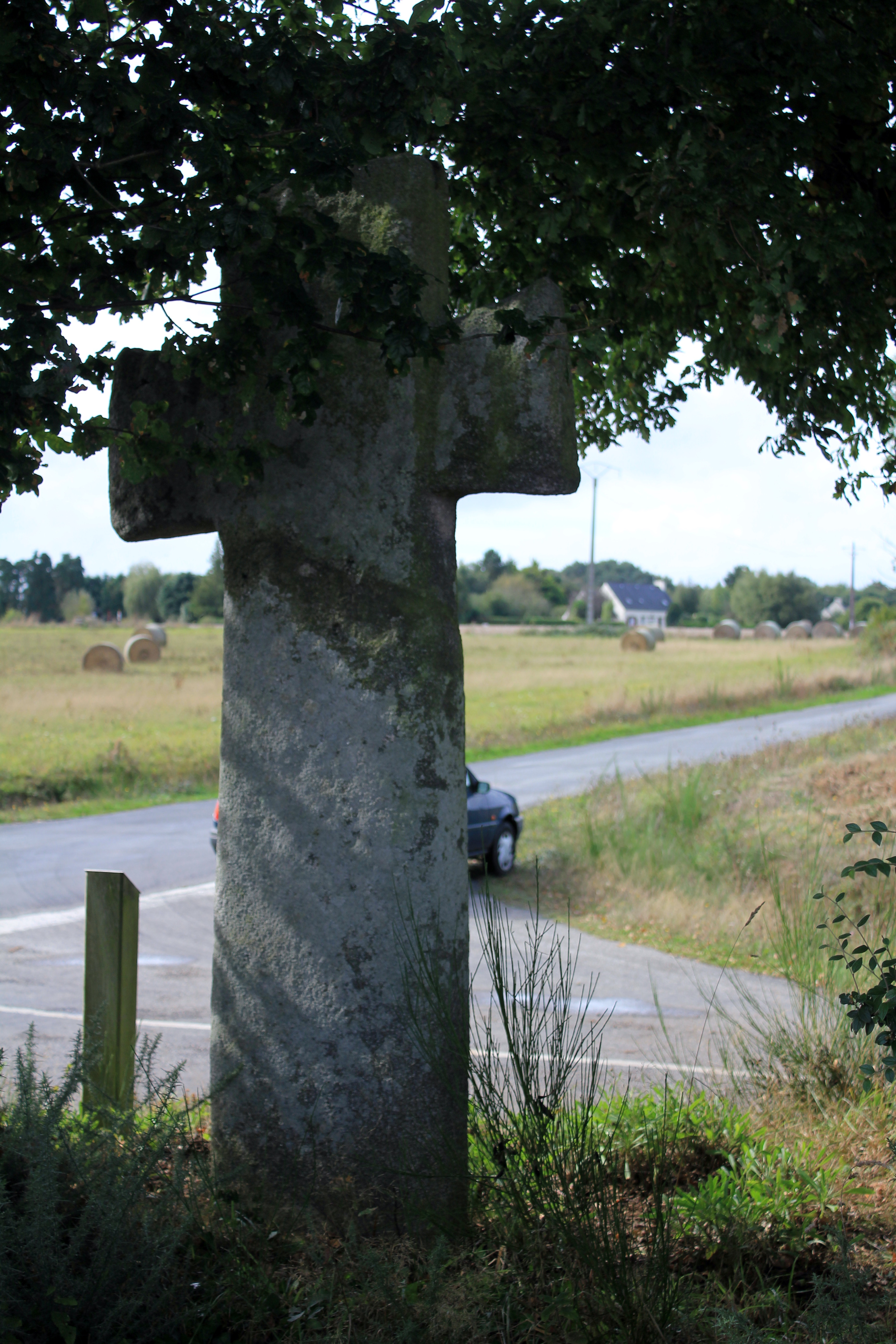
Croix de la Brassée in Guillac, Morbihan

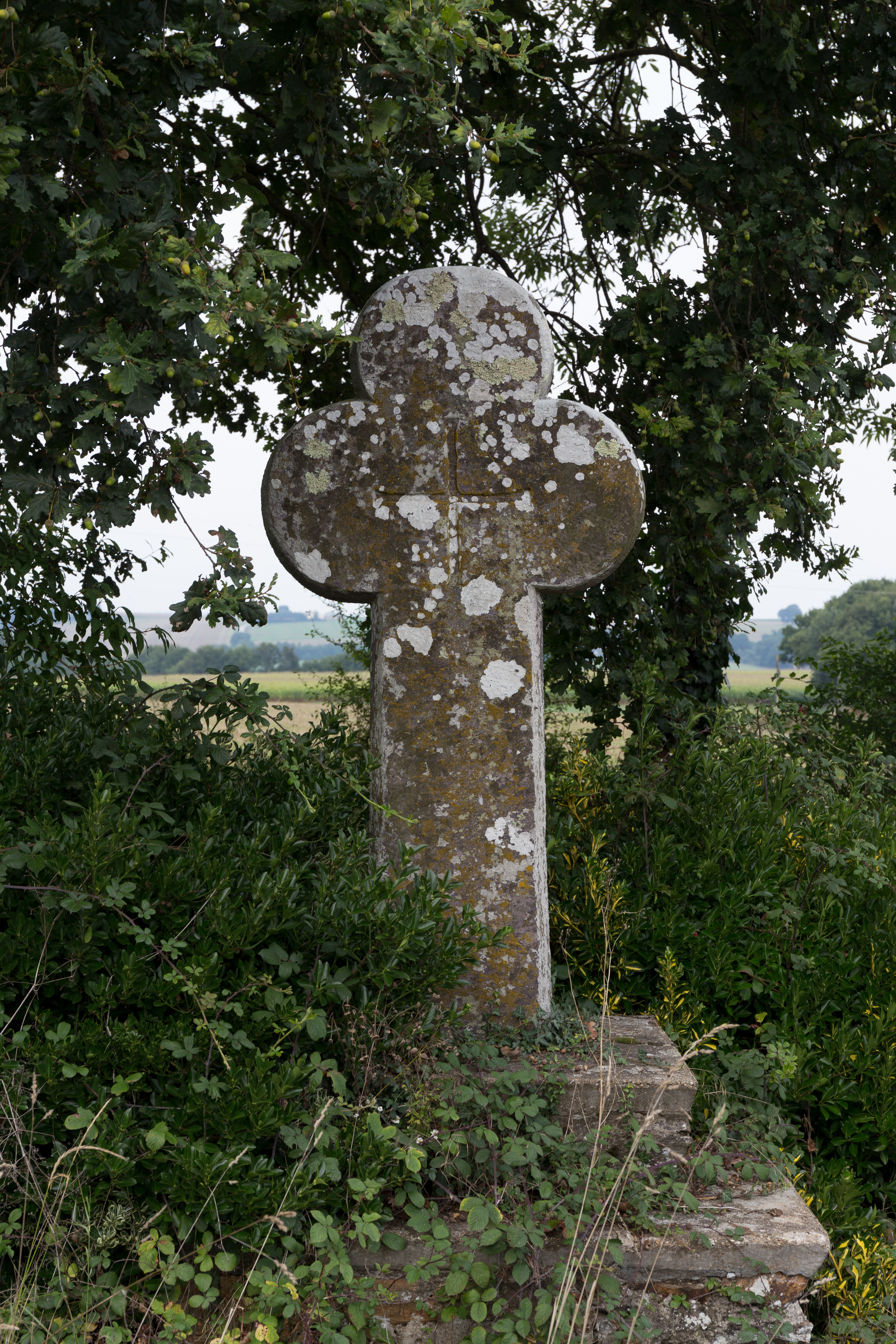
Croix du Valet in Caro, Morbihan

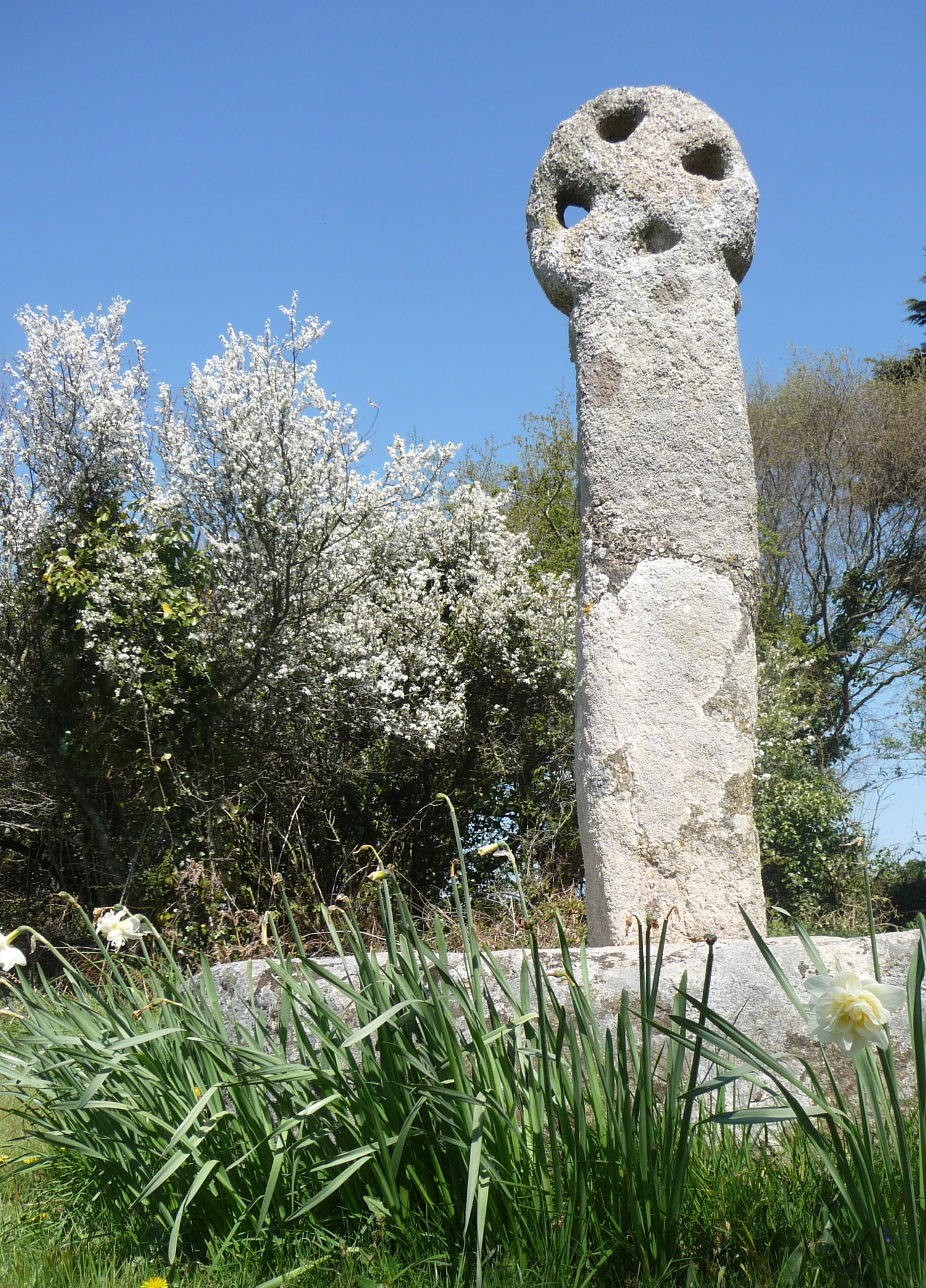
Three Holes Cross in Cornwall

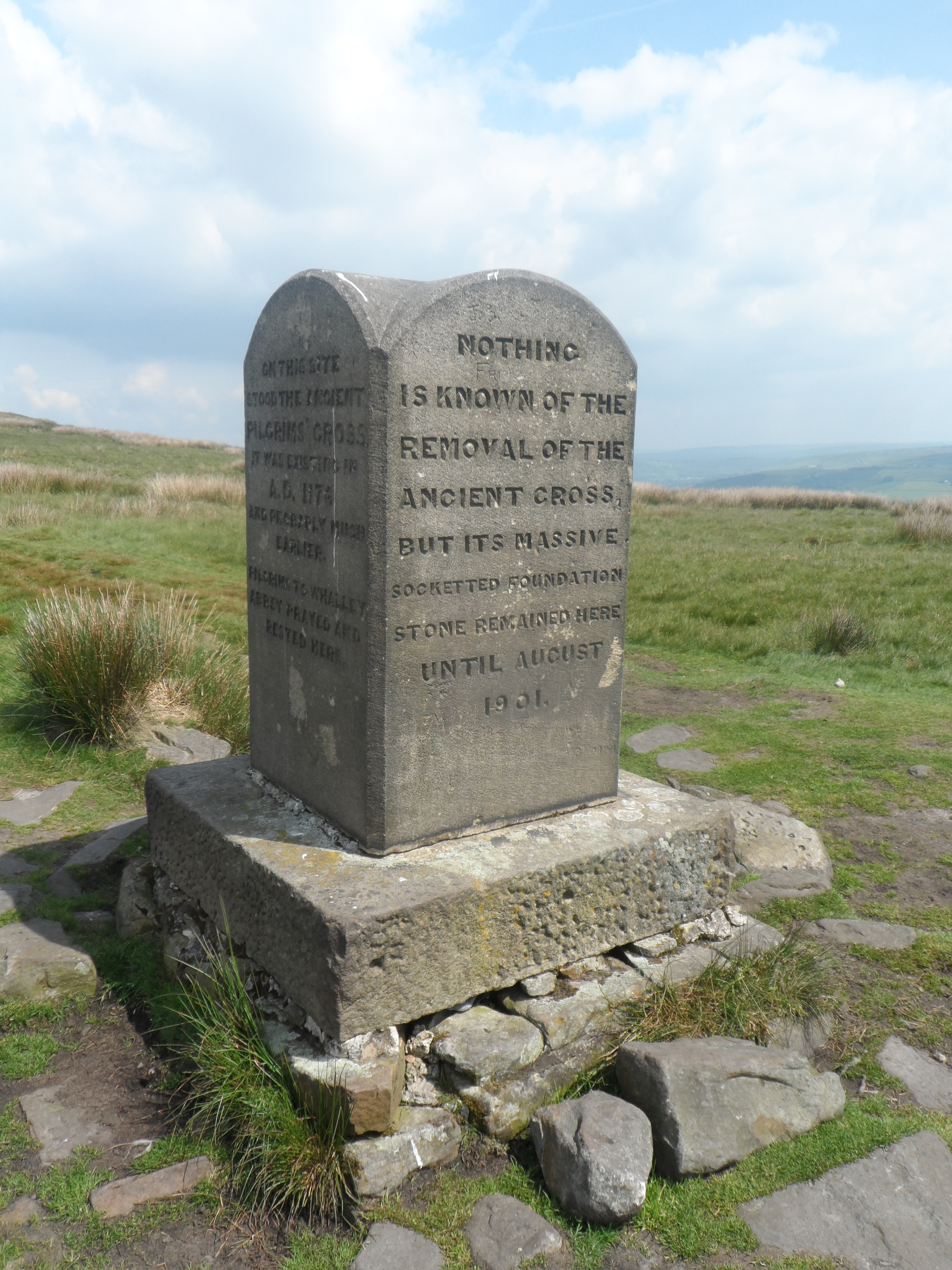
The Pilgrims' Cross, Holcombe Moor, marks the site of a 12th-century cross

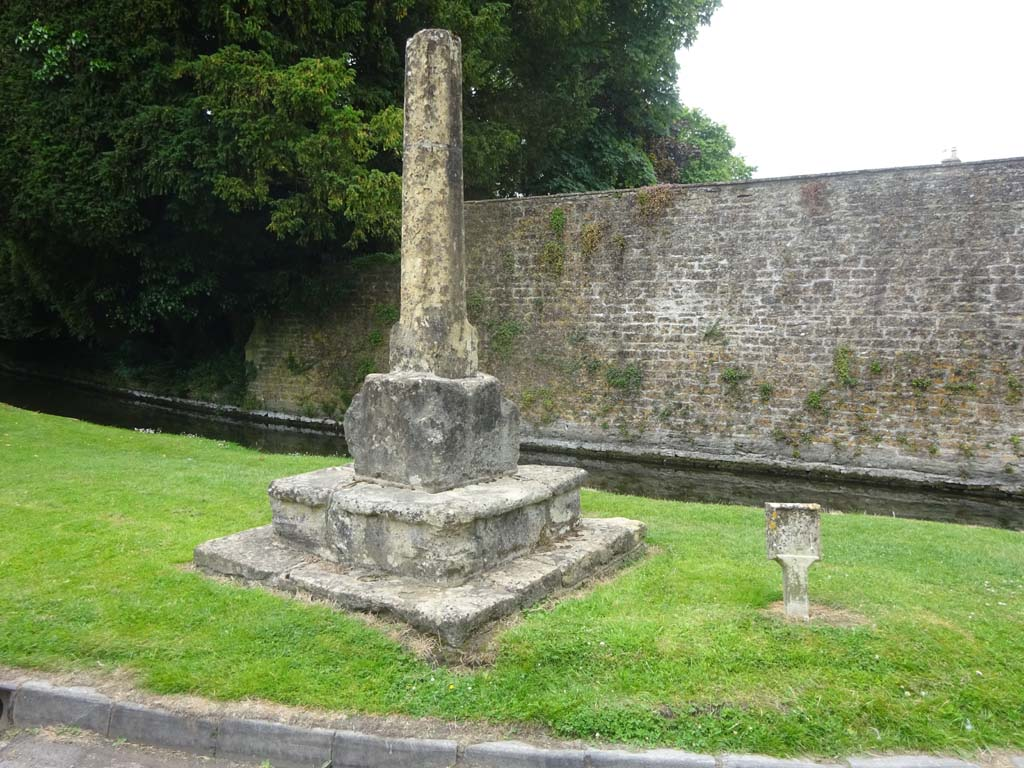
Wayside Cross, River Thames, Ashton Keynes, Wiltshire

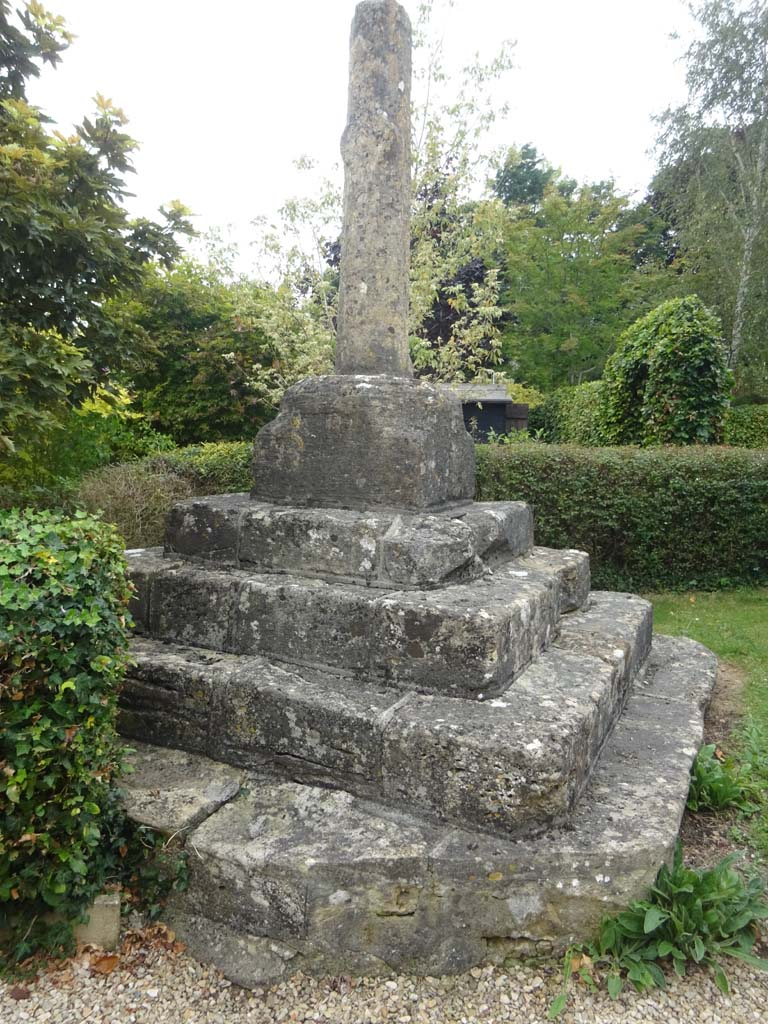
Wayside Cross, Park Place, Ashton Keynes, Wiltshire
Crucifixes

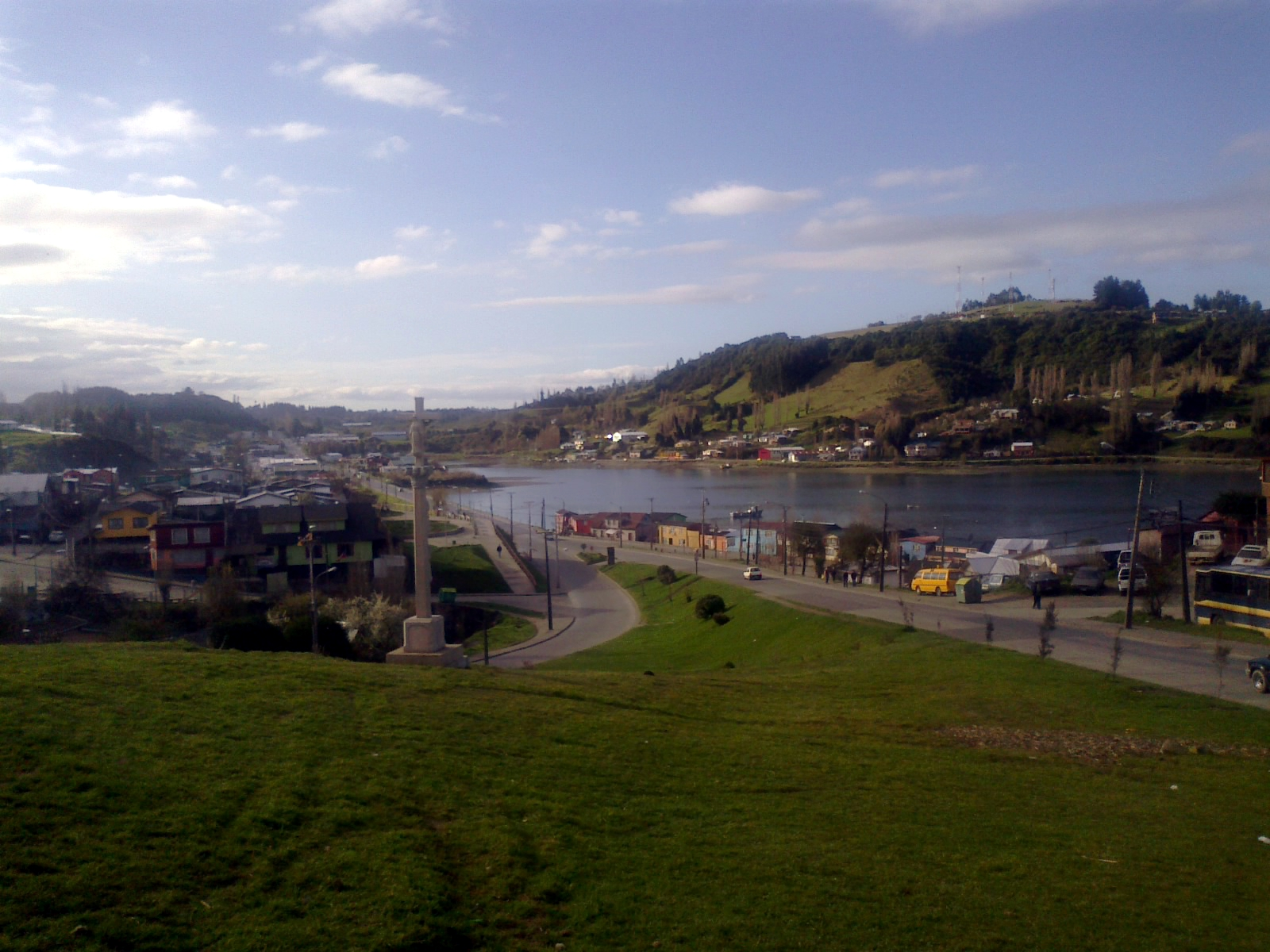
Wayside cross in Castro, Chile.

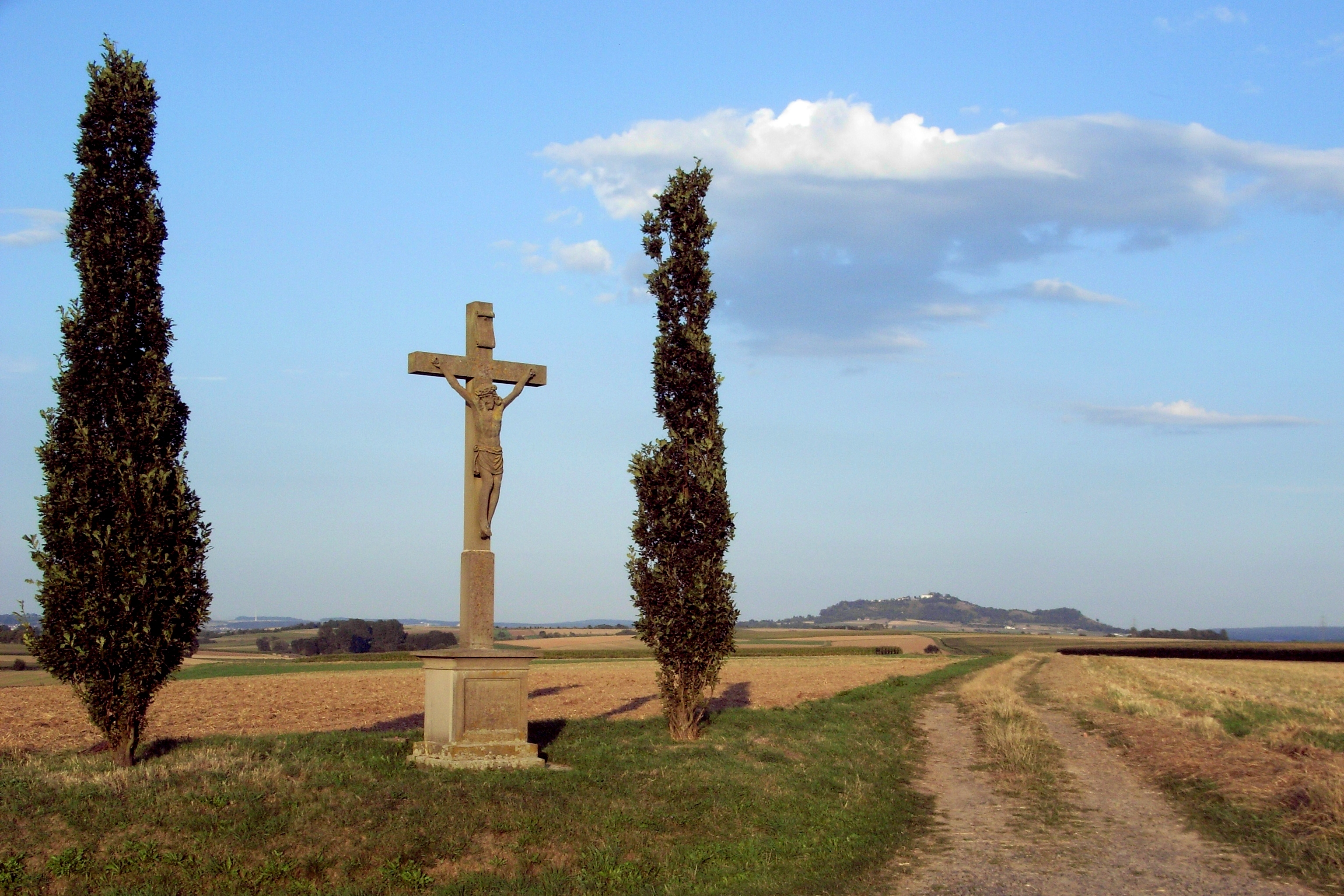
Wayside cross between Bauerbach, Marburg and Marburg-Schröck by the K35, Germany.

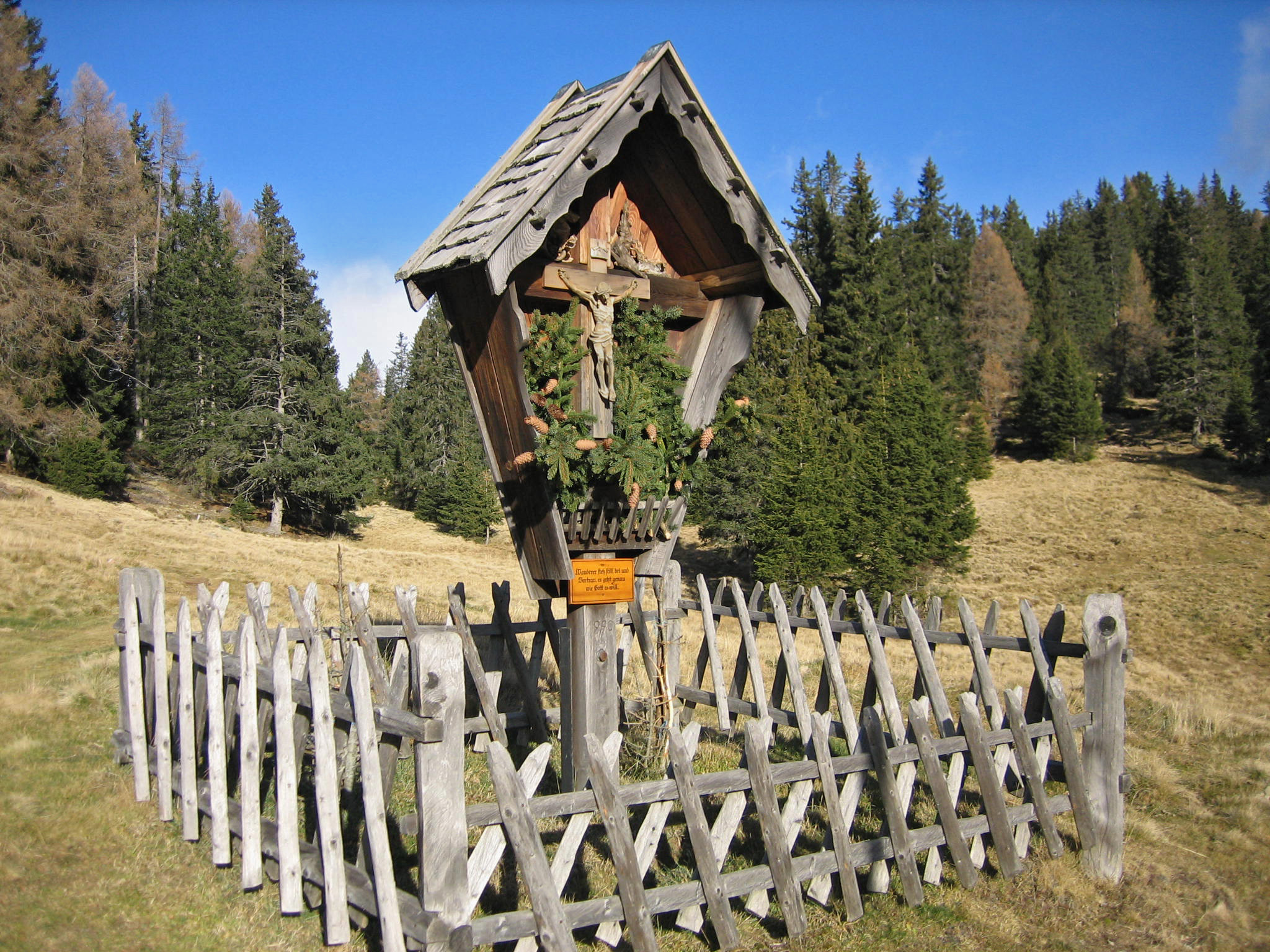
Wayside cross on the Salten in Vöran, South Tyrol, Italy.

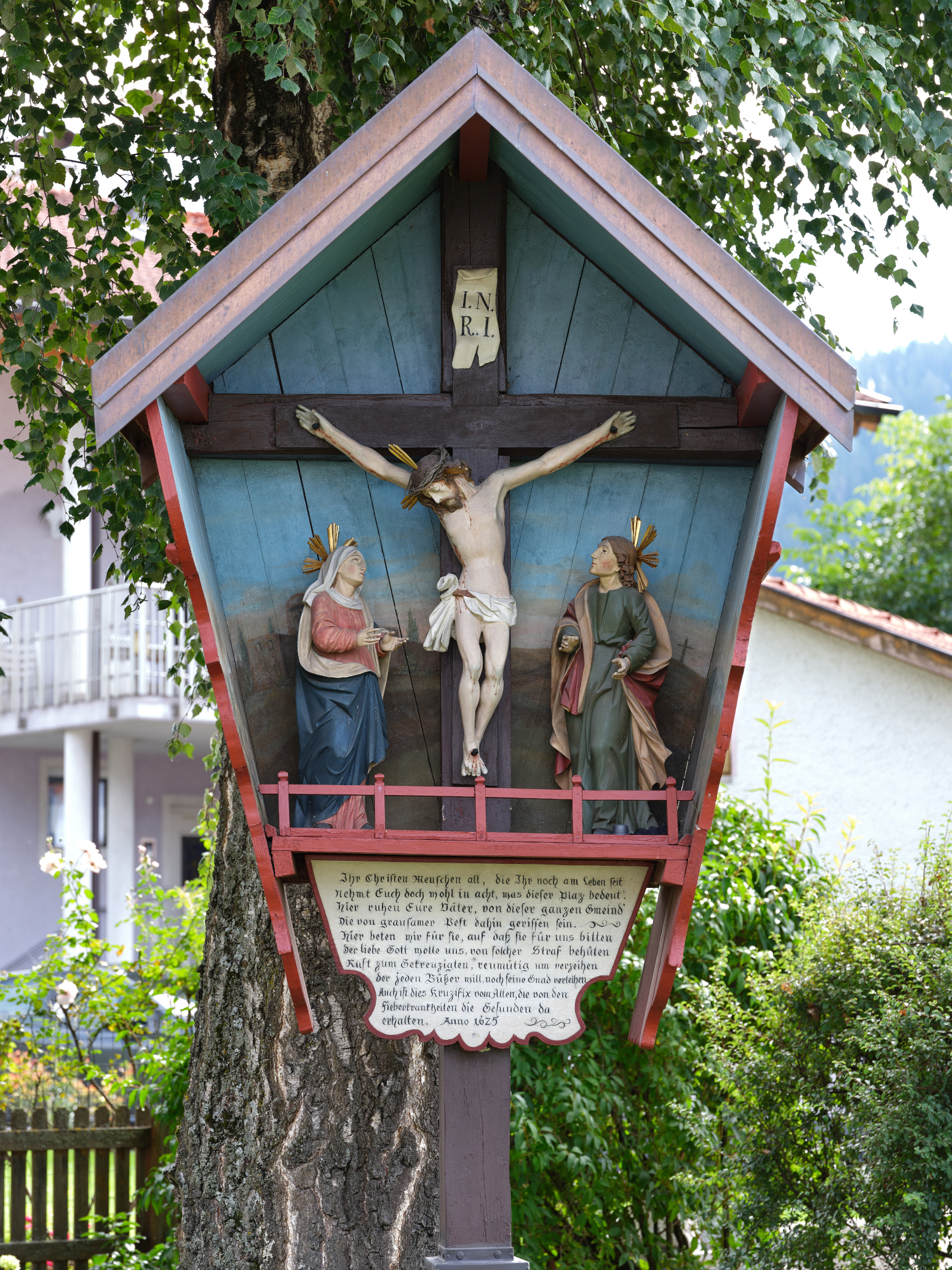
Wooden wayside cross in Völs, Tyrol, Austria.

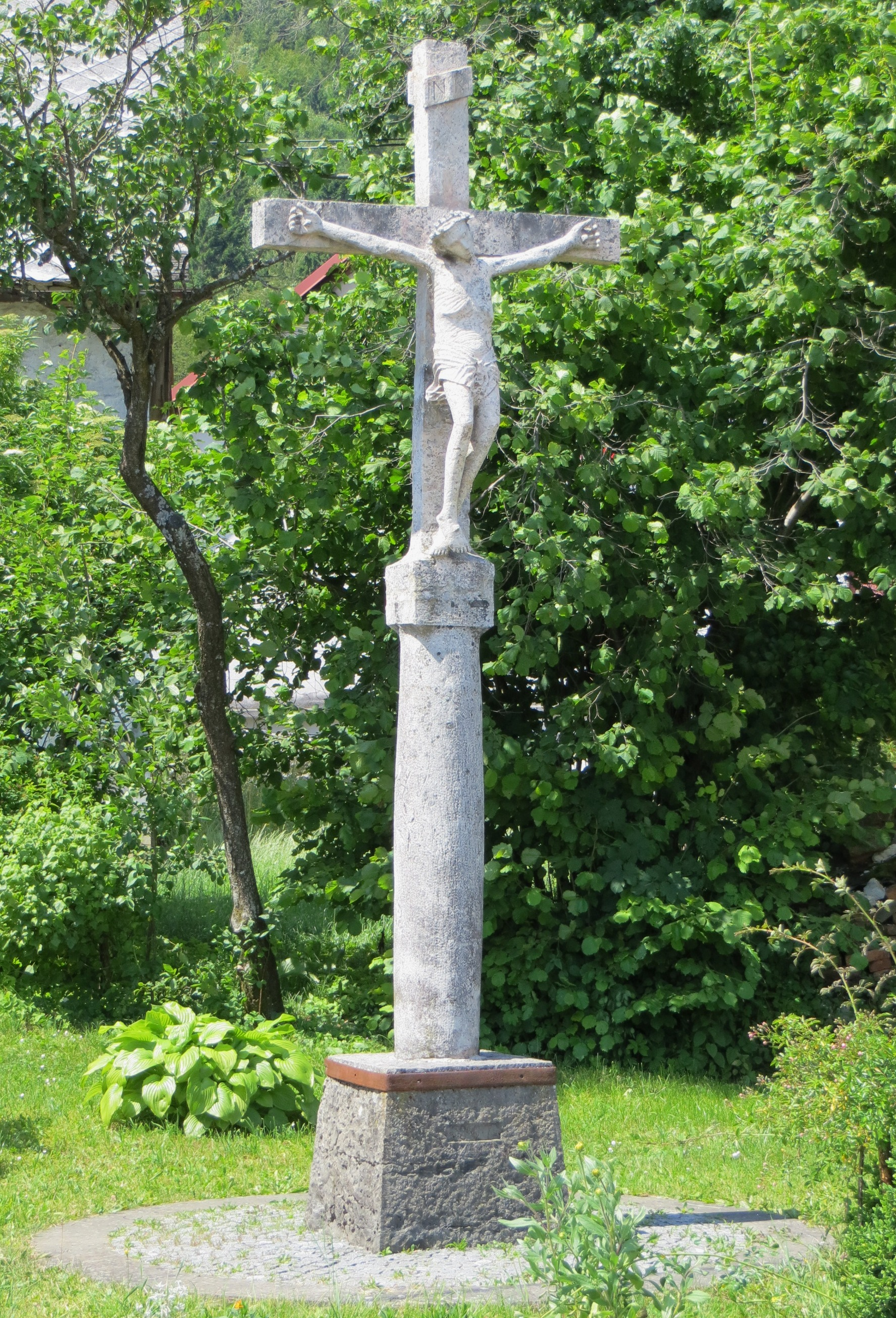
Wayside cross in Idrija, Slovenia.

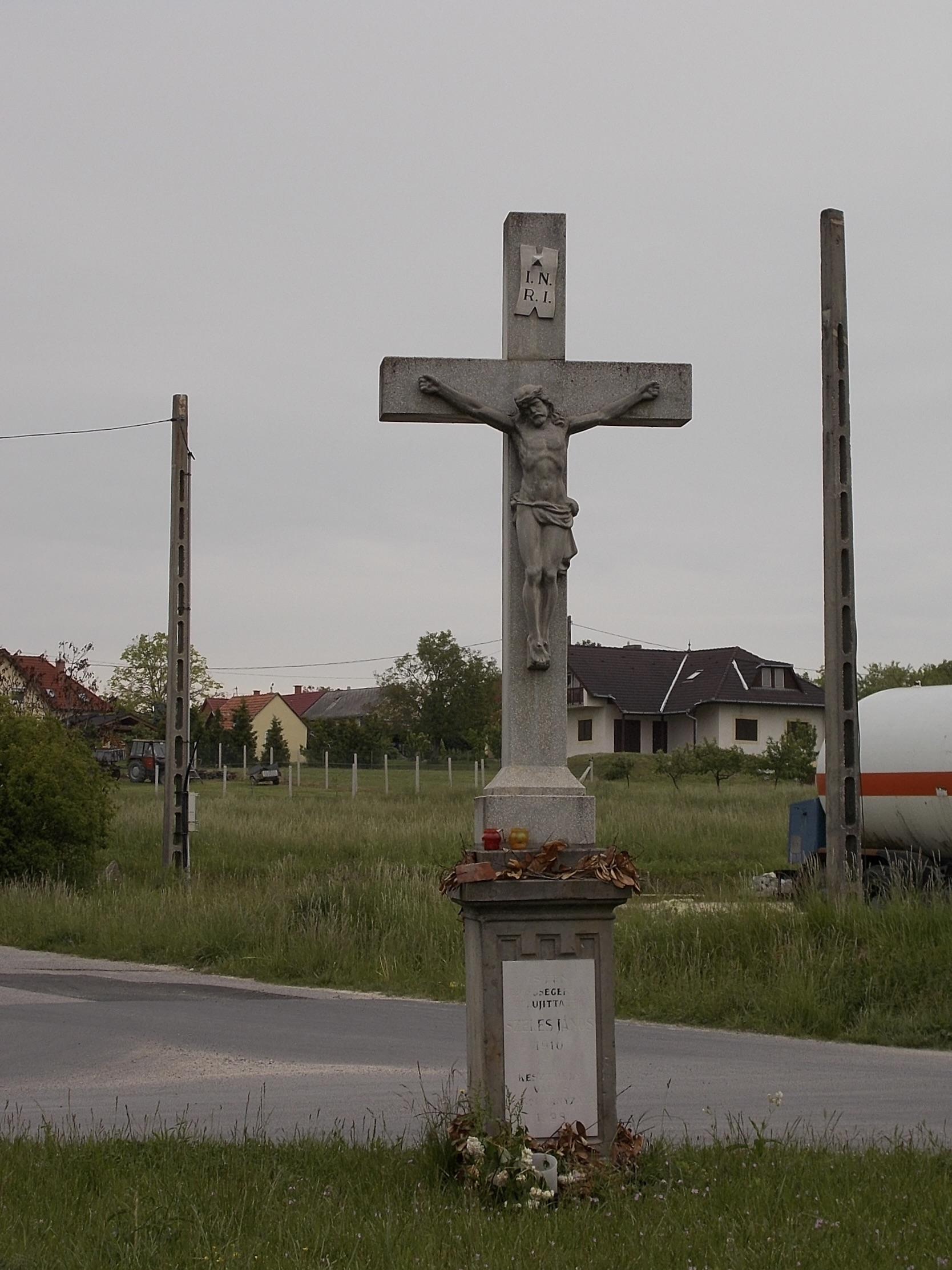
Wooden wayside cross in Keszthely, Hungary.

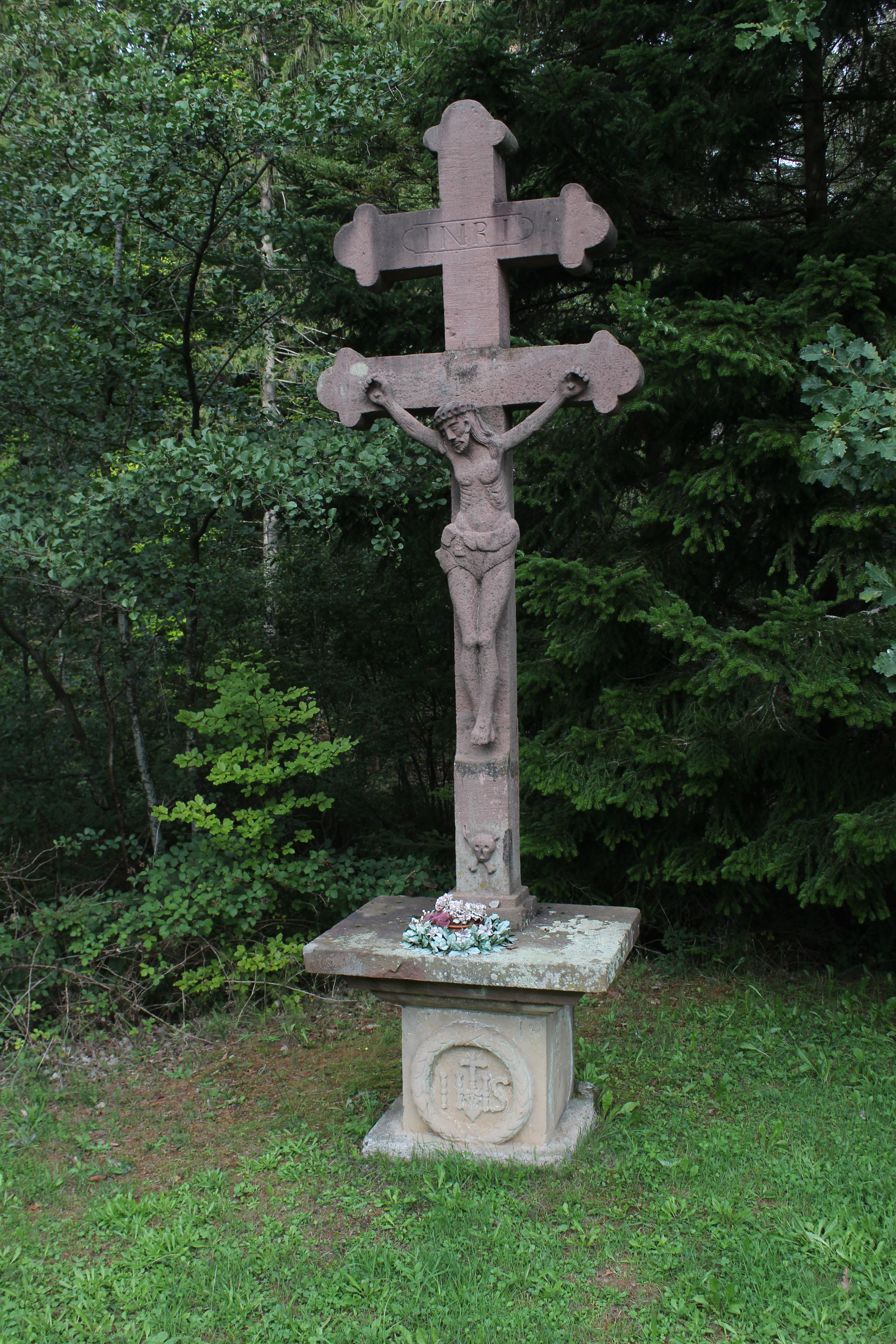
two-barred crucifix in Germany

Crosses

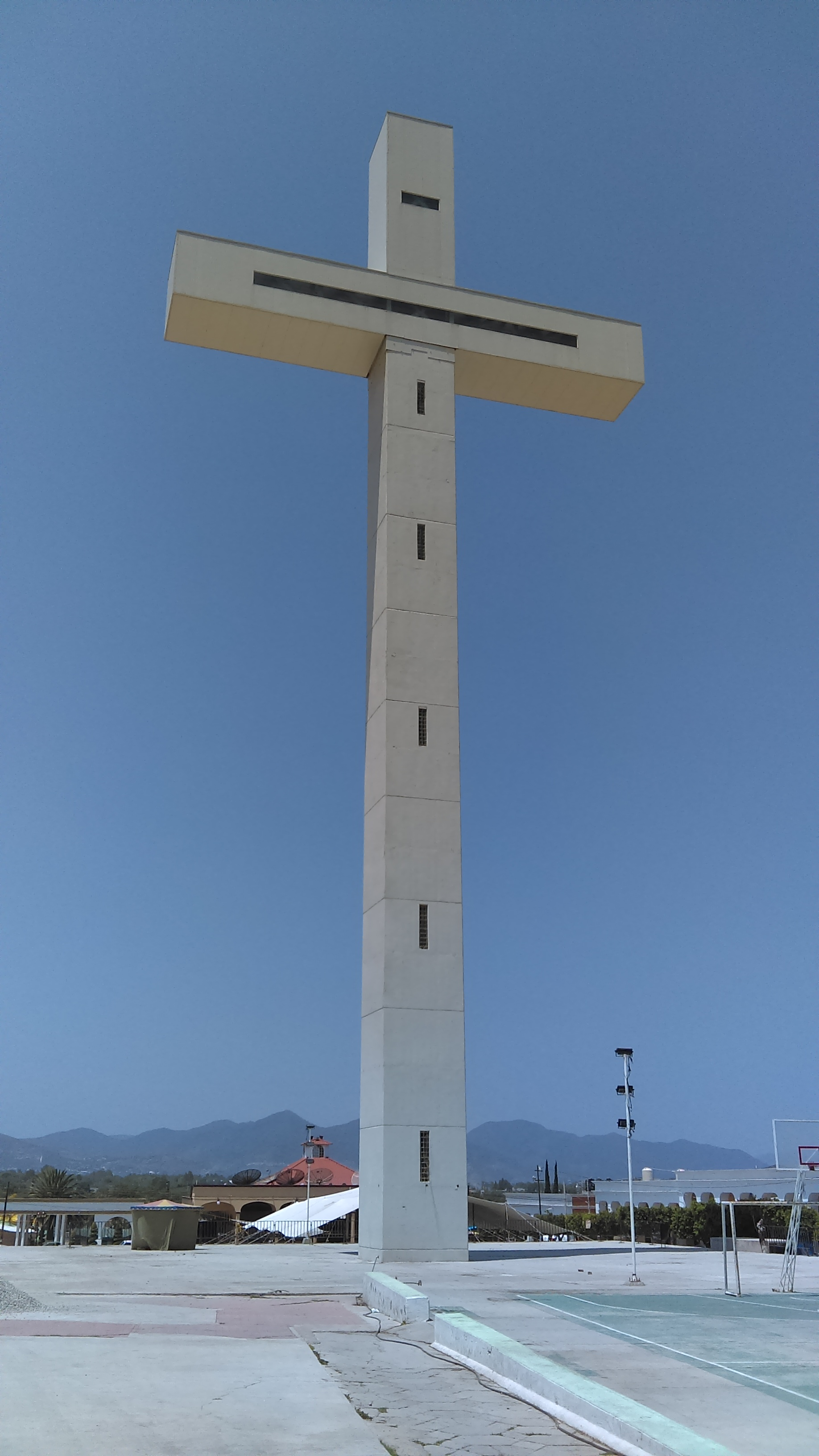
Wayside cross in El Arenal, Jalisco, Mexico.

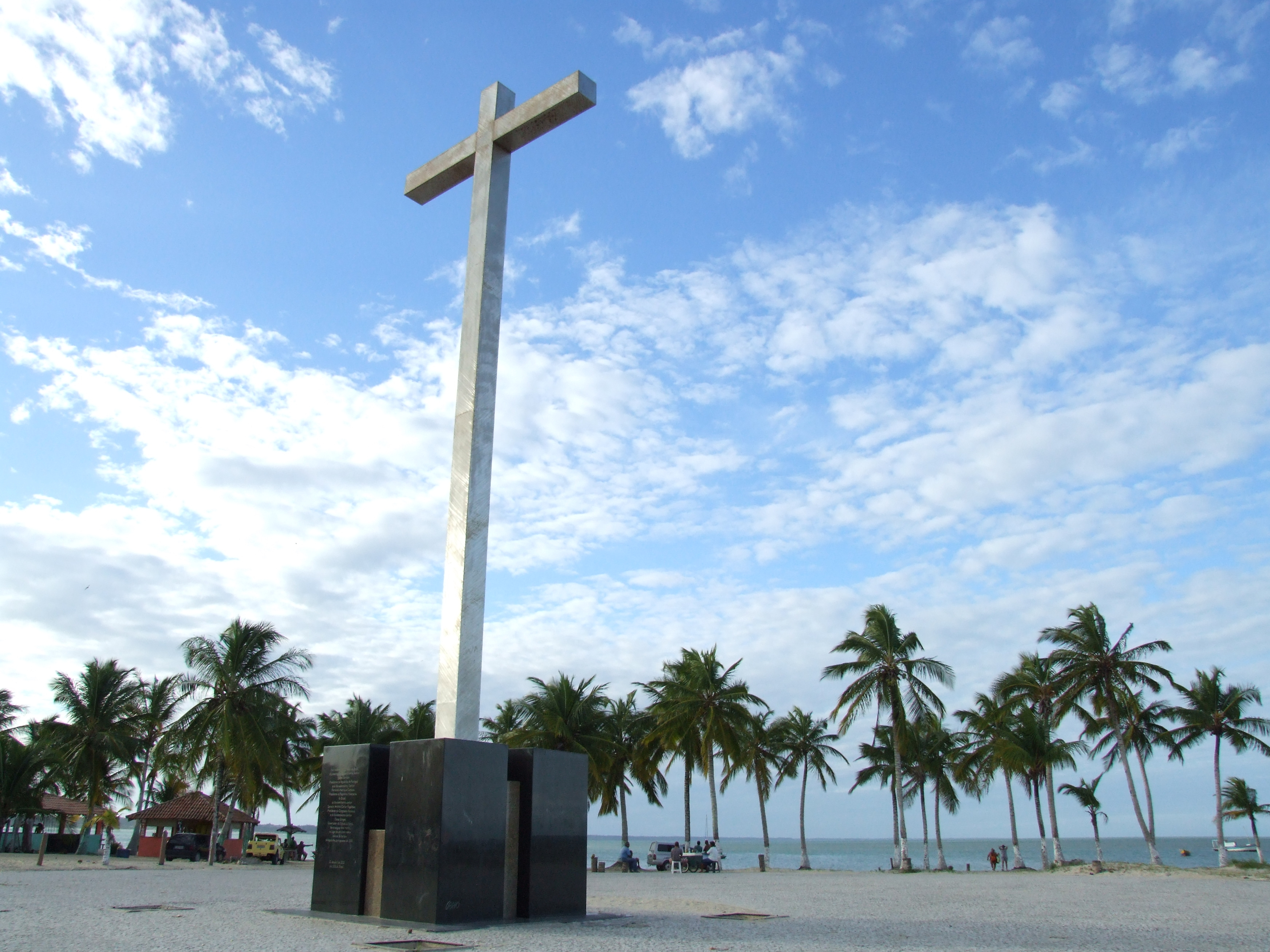
Wayside cross in Santa Cruz Cabrália, Brazil.

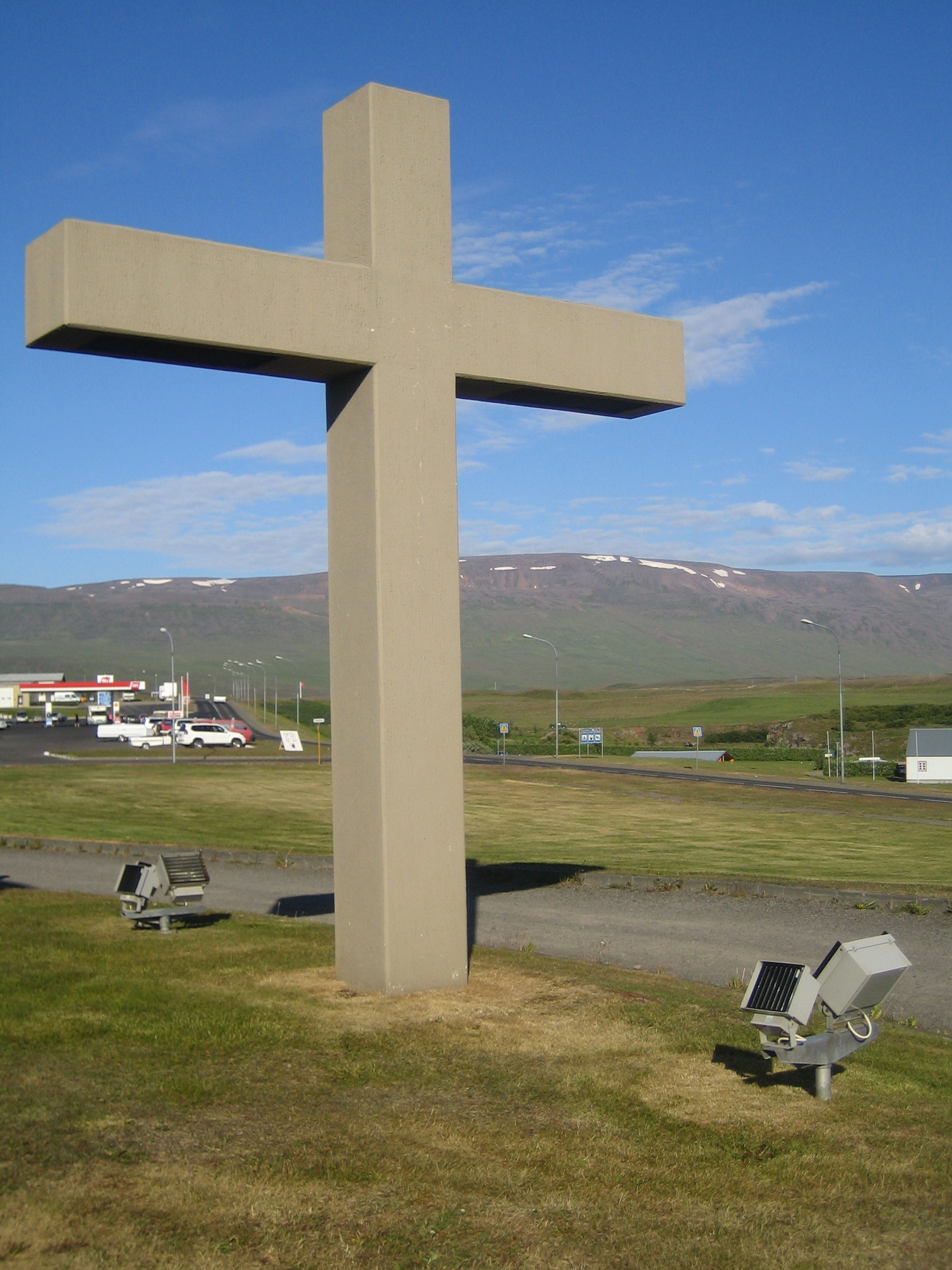
Wayside cross in Blönduós, Iceland.

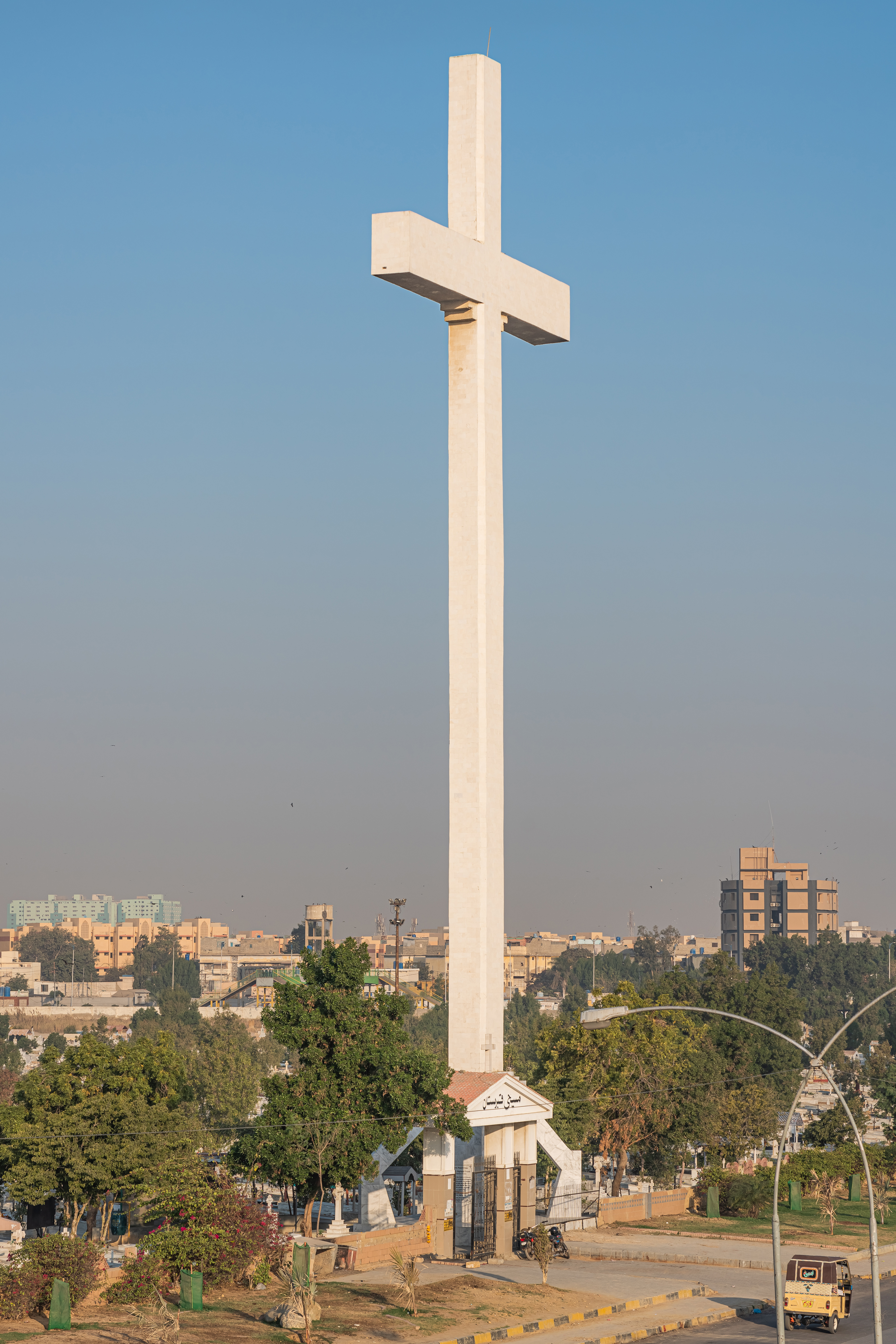
Wayside cross in Karachi, Pakistan.

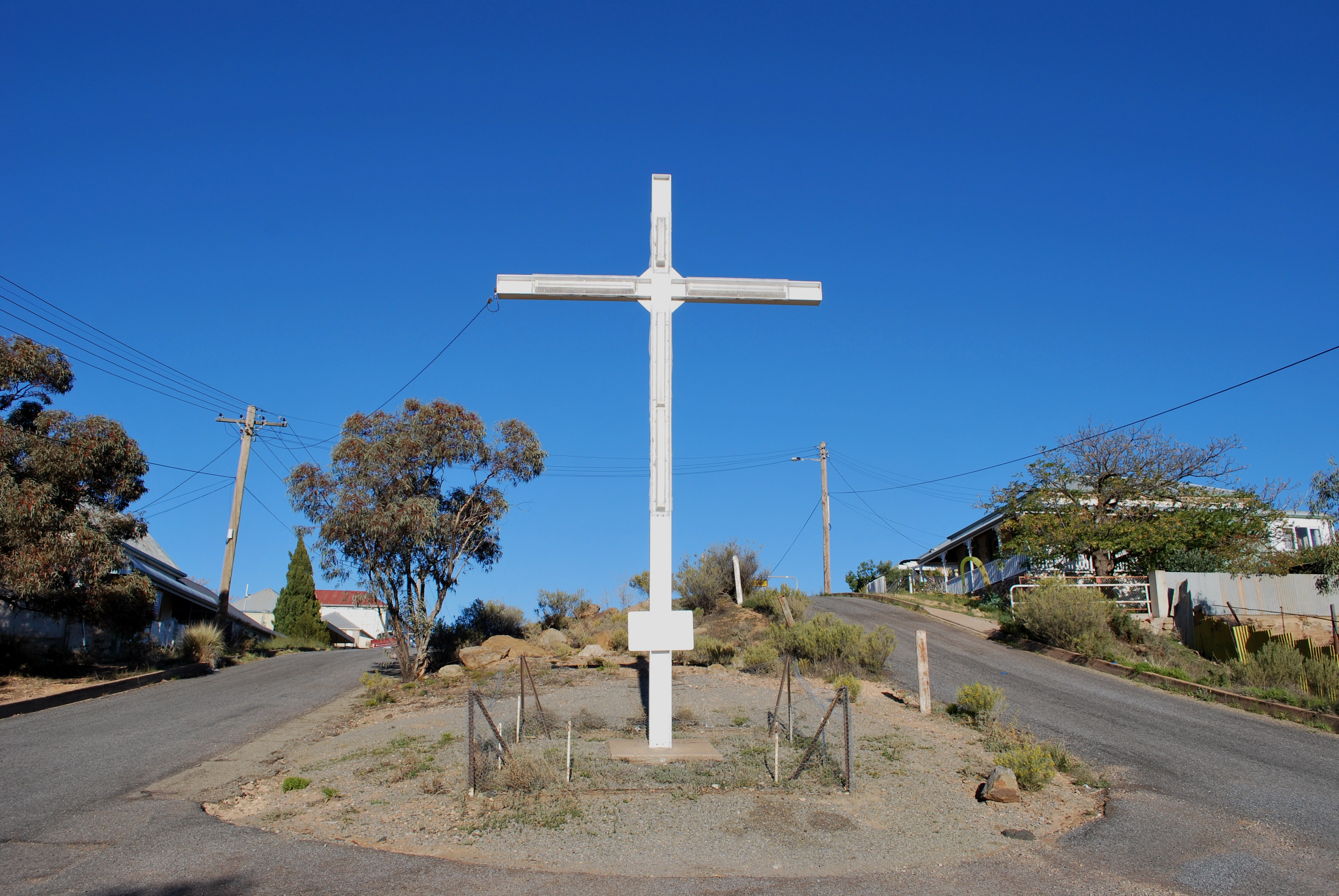
Wayside cross in Broken Hill, New South Wales, Australia.

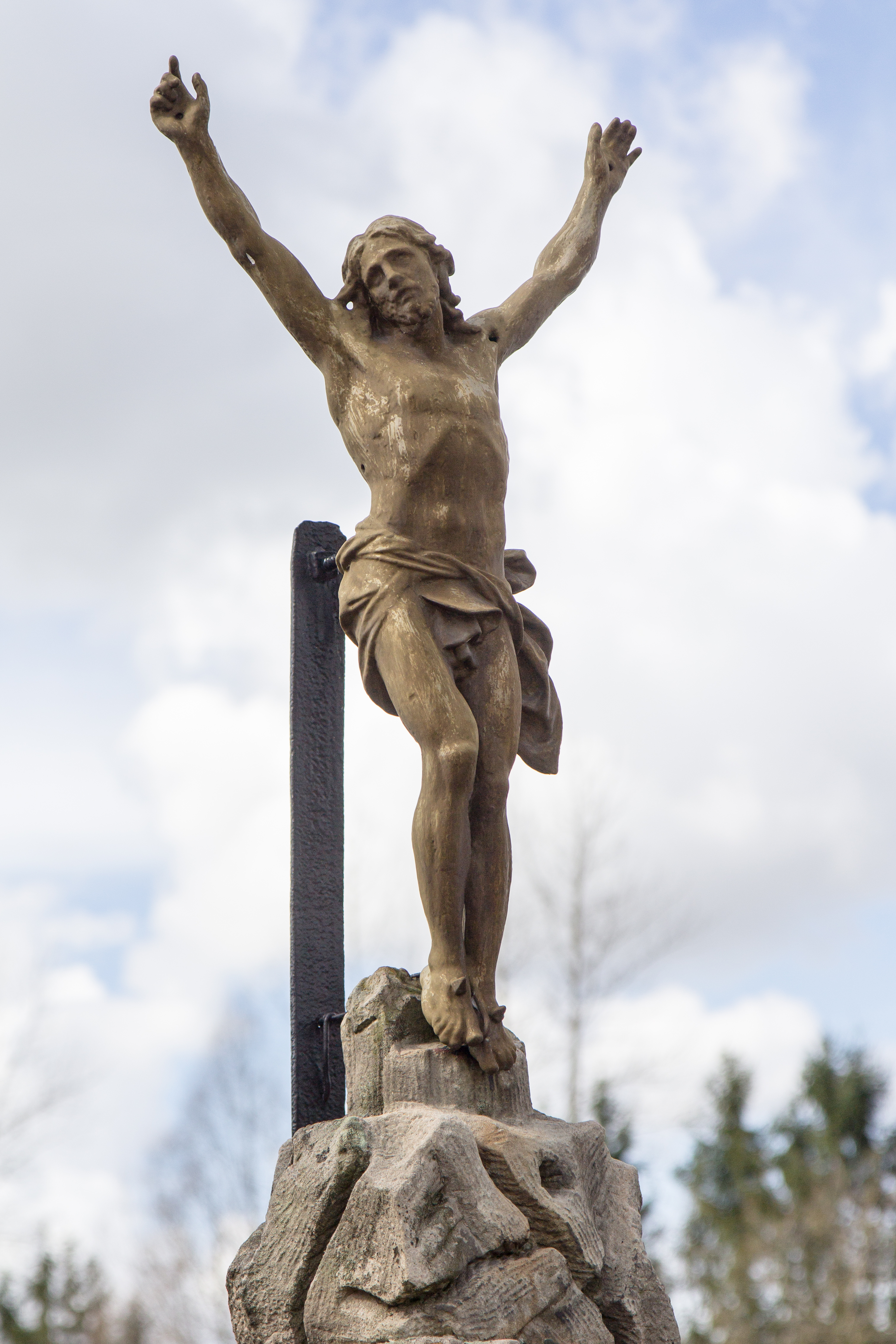
Cross of Saarburg, France

== See also ==
- Buttercross
- List of tallest crosses in the world
- Summit cross
- Wayside shrine

== Literature ==
- Ruth Hacker-de Graaff: Wegekreuze im Bonner Raum. Bouvier, Bonn 1991, ISBN 3-416-80671-9 (also: Bonn, Univ., Diss., 1989/90).
- Andrea Löwer: Kreuze am Straßenrand – Moderne Erinnerungsriten für Verkehrstote, in: Der Tod. Zur Geschichte des Umgangs mit Sterben und Trauer. Ausstellungskatalog des Hessischen Landesmuseums Darmstadt, Volkskundliche Abteilung, ed. by Walter Stolle (Darmstadt 2001) ISBN 3-926527-60-9, pp. 166–171.
- Georg Jakob Meyer, Klaus Freckmann: Wegekreuze und Bildstöcke in der Eifel, an der Mosel und im Hunsrück. In: Rheinisch-westfälische Zeitschrift für Volkskunde. Vol. XXIII, 1977, pp. 226–278.
- Sigrid Metken (ed.): Die letzte Reise. Sterben, Tod und Trauersitten in Oberbayern. Hugendubel, München 1984, ISBN 3-88034-247-4.
- Paul Werner: Flurdenkmale. Pannonia-Verlag, Freilassing 1982, ISBN 3-7897-0107-6 (Kleine Pannonia-Reihe 107).
