= Catterton =

Hamlet and civil parish in North Yorkshire, England

Coordinates: 53.90674°N 1.22500°W

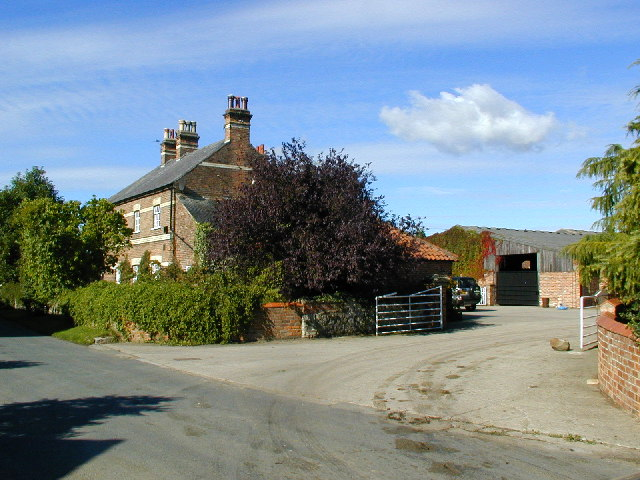
- Farm in Catterton

- Location within North Yorkshire
- OS grid reference: SE510458
- Civil parish: Catterton
- Unitary authority: North Yorkshire
- Ceremonial county: North Yorkshire
- Region: Yorkshire and the Humber
- Country: England
- Sovereign state: United Kingdom
- Post town: TADCASTER
- Postcode district: LS24
- Police: North Yorkshire
- Fire: North Yorkshire
- Ambulance: Yorkshire

Catterton is a hamlet and civil parish in the county of North Yorkshire, England. At the 2011 Census the population was less than 100. The population is included in the civil parish of Healaugh, Tadcaster.

From 1974 to 2023 it was part of the Selby District, it is now administered by the unitary North Yorkshire Council.

== Etymology ==
The first part of the name Catterton is the Brittonic cadeir, "chair, throne". This is suffixed with the Old English -tun, "a farm". Chadderton and Chatterton in Lancashire have the same origins.

== History ==
Catterton is the location of one moated site which is a scheduled monument under the Ancient Monuments and Archaeological Areas Act 1979. Most such sites were built between 1250 and 1350, though construction continued throughout the medieval period.

In the 17th century, the inhabitants of Catterton came into conflict with people from the neighbouring village of Bilbrough over a tract of unenclosed moorland between the two settlements. A meeting between the two sides organised by the intervention of prominent Yorkshire figures including Robert Fairfax devolved into violence. In 1723, the two sides resolved their dispute by digging a ditch from Thwaites Lane to Escars to divide the land; the ditch still existed by 1900.
