= Holcombe, Greater Manchester =

Coordinates: 53°38′42″N 2°19′56″W

Holcombe
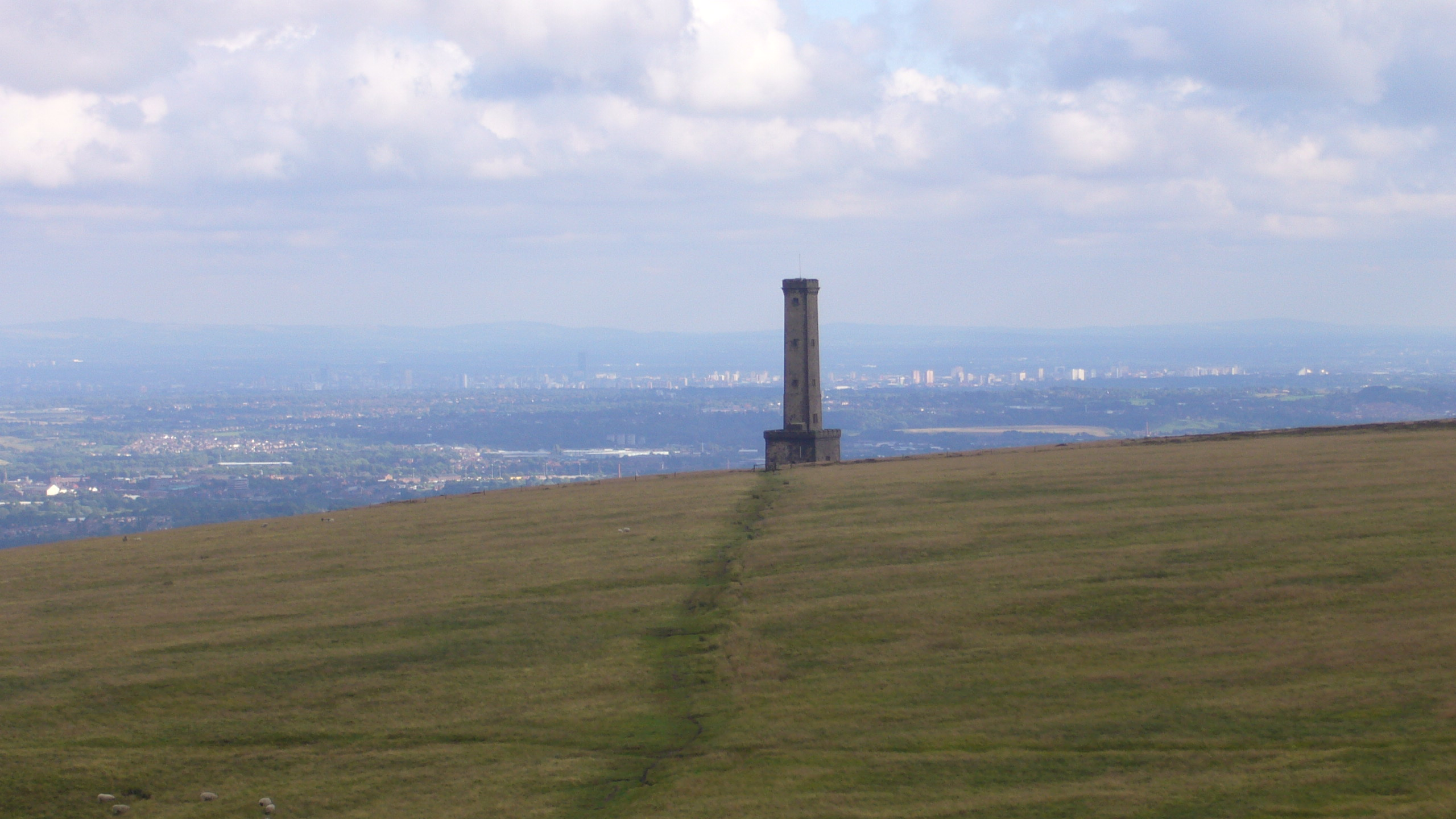
- The Peel Monument above Holcombe

- Location within Greater Manchester
- Population: 248
- OS grid reference: SD785165
- Metropolitan borough: Bury
- Metropolitan county: Greater Manchester
- Region: North West
- Country: England
- Sovereign state: United Kingdom
- Post town: BURY
- Postcode district: BL0
- Dialling code: 01706
- Police: Greater Manchester
- Fire: Greater Manchester
- Ambulance: North West
- UK Parliament: Bury North

Holcombe is a village in the Metropolitan Borough of Bury, Greater Manchester, England, south of Haslingden, east of Edgworth, west of Ramsbottom, and north of Tottington. The name comes from the Celtic cwm meaning valley, and the Old English hol, meaning deep or hollow.

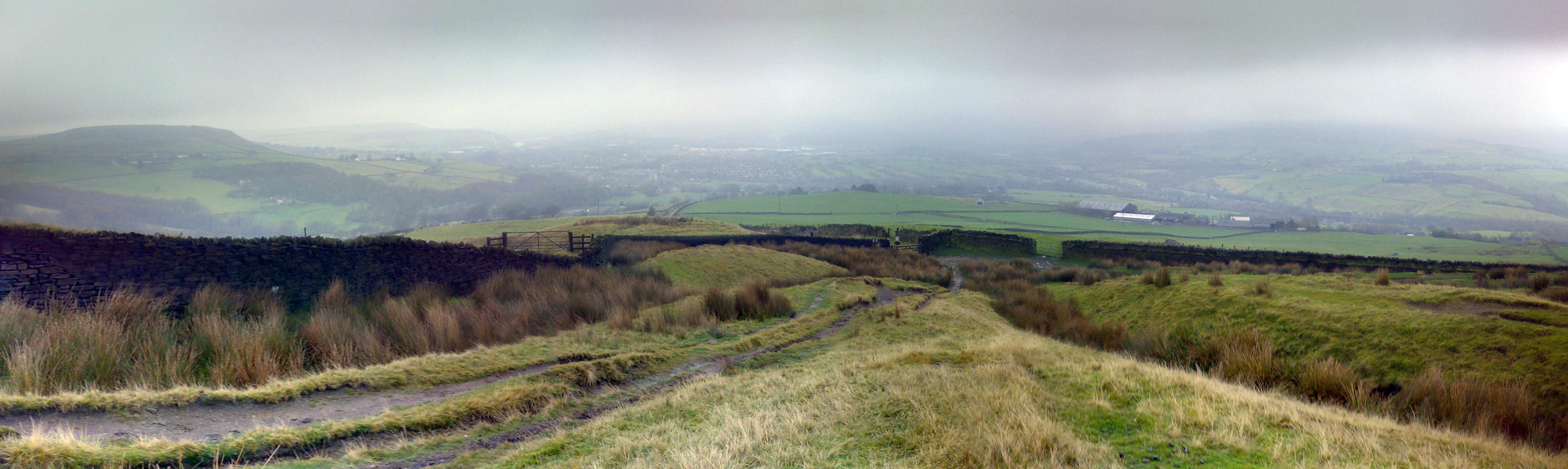
Holcombe Moor, to the north of the Peel Monument, looking east

== Location and amenities ==
The village is located on the slopes of Holcombe Moor. Much of the moorland around the village is in the care of the National Trust and is popular with walkers, cyclists and bird watchers. The buildings in the area are made up predominantly of stone cottages and farms. There is a public house called the Shoulder of Mutton, a restaurant, church, and primary school. At one time the village also had a shop, post office, a lock-up, and a regular bus service linking it to Holcombe Brook, a neighbouring village in the valley bottom one mile to the south. Holcombe Brook and Holcombe Village are served by local community radio station "TOWER FM 107.4fm".

Holcombe also gives its name to an Annual Gamecock Show, held on New Year's Day in Ramsbottom.

Since 1973, Holcombe Hall has been home to Darul Uloom Al-Arabiyyah Al-Islamiyyah, the first Islamic Darul uloom school of higher-education in the United Kingdom.

== History ==
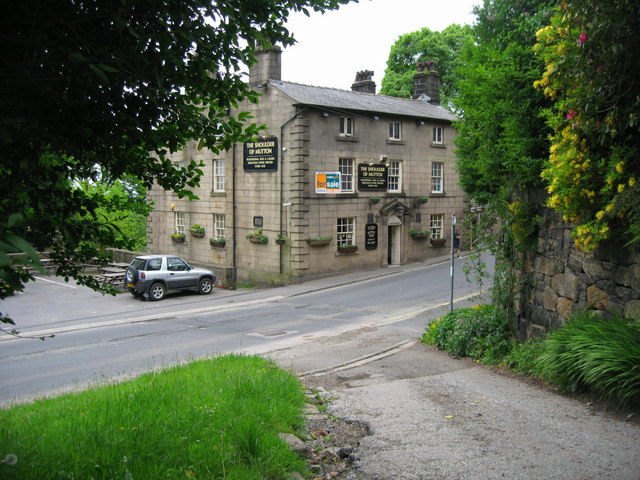
The Shoulder of Mutton public house

Holcombe was historically a hamlet within the township of Tottington, part of the Duchy of Lancaster. Its Pilgrim's Cross marks the position of a 12th-century wayside cross. During the Middle Ages Holcombe hosted the regular court sessions of the Royal Manor of Tottington. In the Tudor period, Holcombe had a bloomery.

Holcombe is the home of the Holcombe Hunt. This pack of harriers, which has been kennelled at Holcombe for over 200 years, is one of the oldest in the country. In 1617 the Holcombe Pack was taken to Hoghton Tower on the occasion of the King James I visit, when he granted the royal warrant to hunt over 12 townships, and the privilege of wearing the scarlet livery of the king. The Hunt was granted a coat of arms in 1985 the motto being "Hunting and conserving".

Holcombe Hall was built in 1846 as a country house for the Aitken family, and later served as a sanatorium.

In 1852, a tower was erected as a monument to Sir Robert Peel.

Emmanuel Church, on Chapel Lane, was built in 1853, by Thomas Holt, on the site of an earlier chapel. It is a Grade II listed building. It gives its name to the nearby Emmanuel Church of England primary school.

During the evening of 25 September 1916, Holcombe was subjected to one of the first aerial offensives in history. L21, a Zeppelin commanded by Oberleutnant Kurt Frankenburg of the Imperial German Navy, dropped five bombs on the village on its way to Bolton. The post office and village school were damaged, as was the Shoulder of Mutton public house, where villagers took cover in the cellars. Three of the bombs fell close to the church, which suffered some damage to its windows.

Between 1977 and 1995, the television series The Krypton Factor used the British Army Rifle Range training course at Holcombe Moor in one of its contestant rounds.

== See also ==
- Darul Uloom Bury
