= Peel Monument, Ramsbottom =

Commemorative monument in Ramsbottom, GreaterManchester, England

Peel Monument
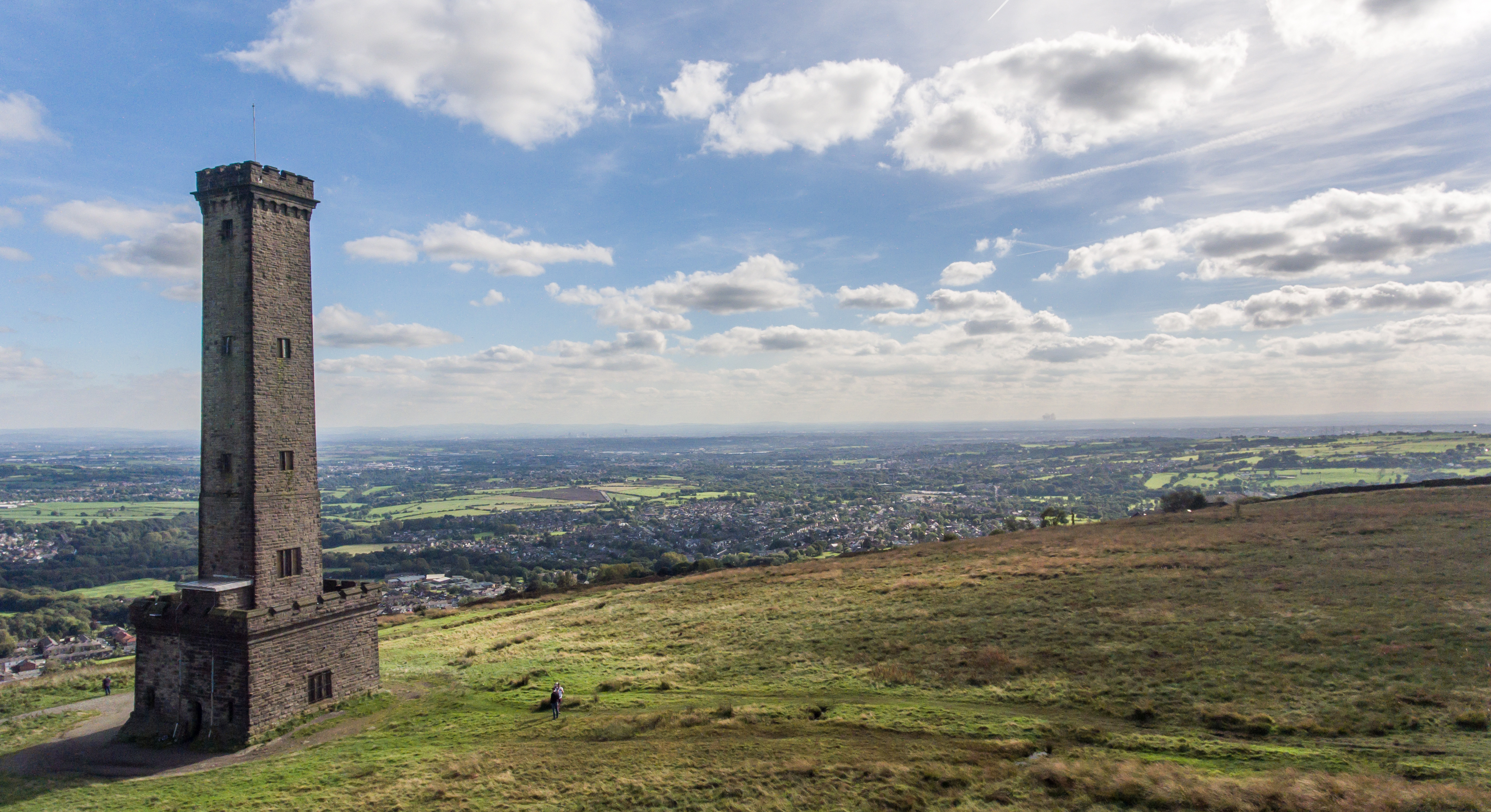
- Aerial photo of Peel Monument overlooking Holcombe and Bury
- Interactive map of Peel Monument
- Location: Holcombe Moor near Ramsbottom
- Coordinates: 53°38′36″N 2°20′17″W
- Material: Gritstone
- Height: 128 feet
- Completion date: 1852
- Dedicated to: Robert Peel

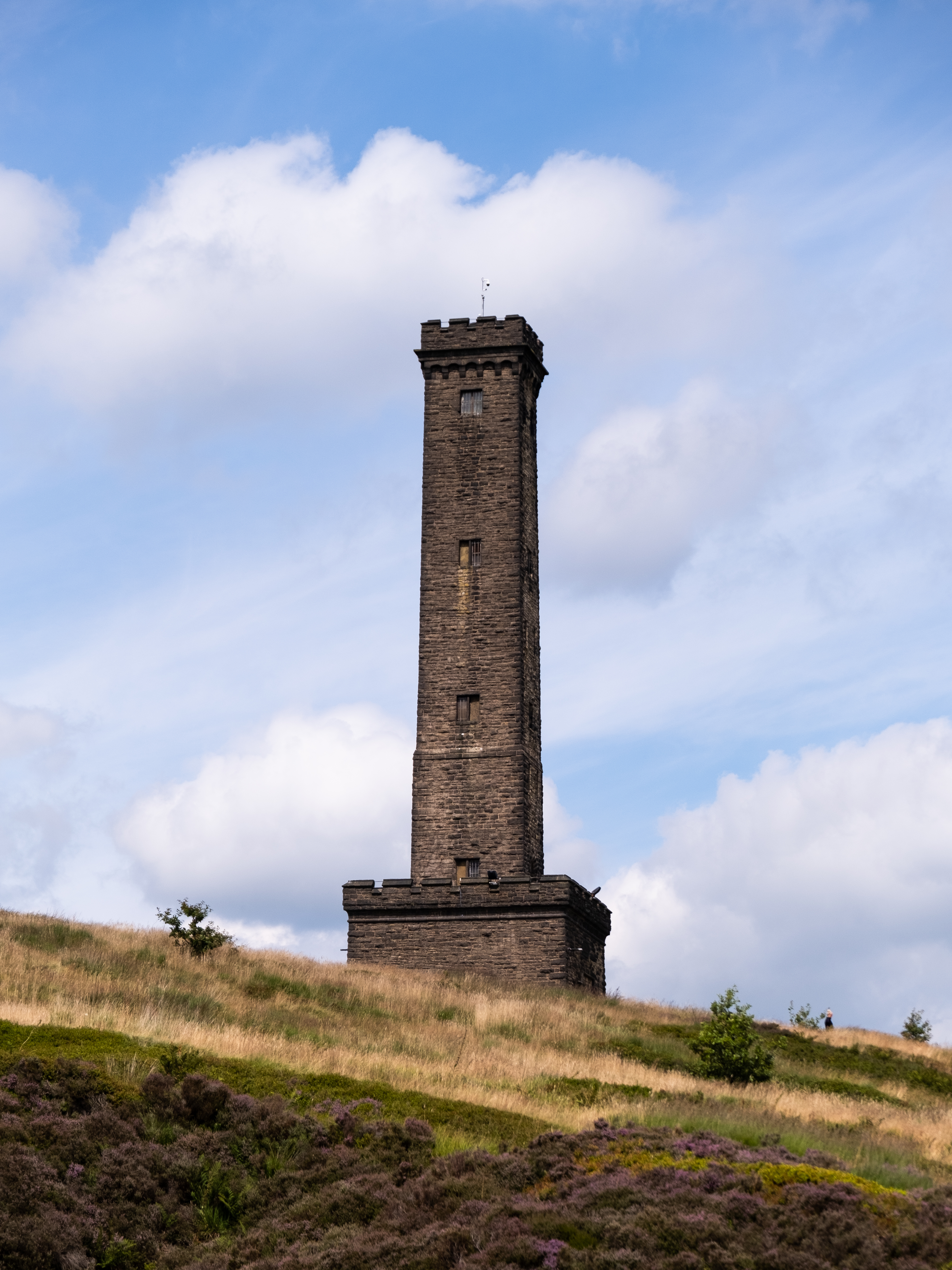
The Peel Monument in August 2022

The Peel Monument at Ramsbottom, Greater Manchester, England, is one of two monuments in the area erected in memory of Prime Minister and founder of the police force Robert Peel, who was born in Bury. It is on Holcombe Moor near Ramsbottom, 1100 feet (335 metres) above sea level. and the monument is known locally as Holcombe Tower or Peel Tower.

Construction began soon after Peel's death in 1850, and the monument was officially opened on 9 September 1852. It cost £1000 to build and is 128 feet (39 m) tall.

== Construction ==
After Peel's death in 1850 there was a campaign to erect a statue in Bury and a monument at the top of Harcles Hill. A monuments committee was convened and chaired by local industrialist William Grant. Grant insisted that, when viewed from his home at Nuttall Hall, the tower should be in line with St Andrews Church, which he had also built in 1832.

The monument, standing 128 feet, was built at a cost of £1000 raised through public appeal. The gritstone used to construct the monument was quarried from the hill itself with the hole left by the excavation adjacent to the tower still visible. The name "Peel" is carved in large letters above the door of the large crenellated base section that supports the tower, which has four stages of mullioned windows and is also crenellated with battlements at the top. A report in the Manchester Guardian noted that, while the monument is not "a specimen of architectural beauty", it provides a conspicuous landmark and it also has a viewing platform from which to look across the surrounding countryside.

The site of the tower belonged to the Duke of Buccleuch, whose permission had not been sought. He granted a lease on the site and allowed that the tower trustees could charge an entrance fee.

== Opening ceremony ==
A statue of Peel by Edward Hodges Baily was unveiled in Bury town centre on 8 September 1852, and a separate ceremony was held to open the tower the following day. Speeches were made by Joshua Knowles, owner of the Tottington calico works, and by Peel's son Frederick Peel. Frederick was the guest of honour and commended the memorial both to the memory of his father and to free trade. Passengers who had travelled by excursion train from Salford arrived too late to witness the ceremony.

== Renovation and access ==
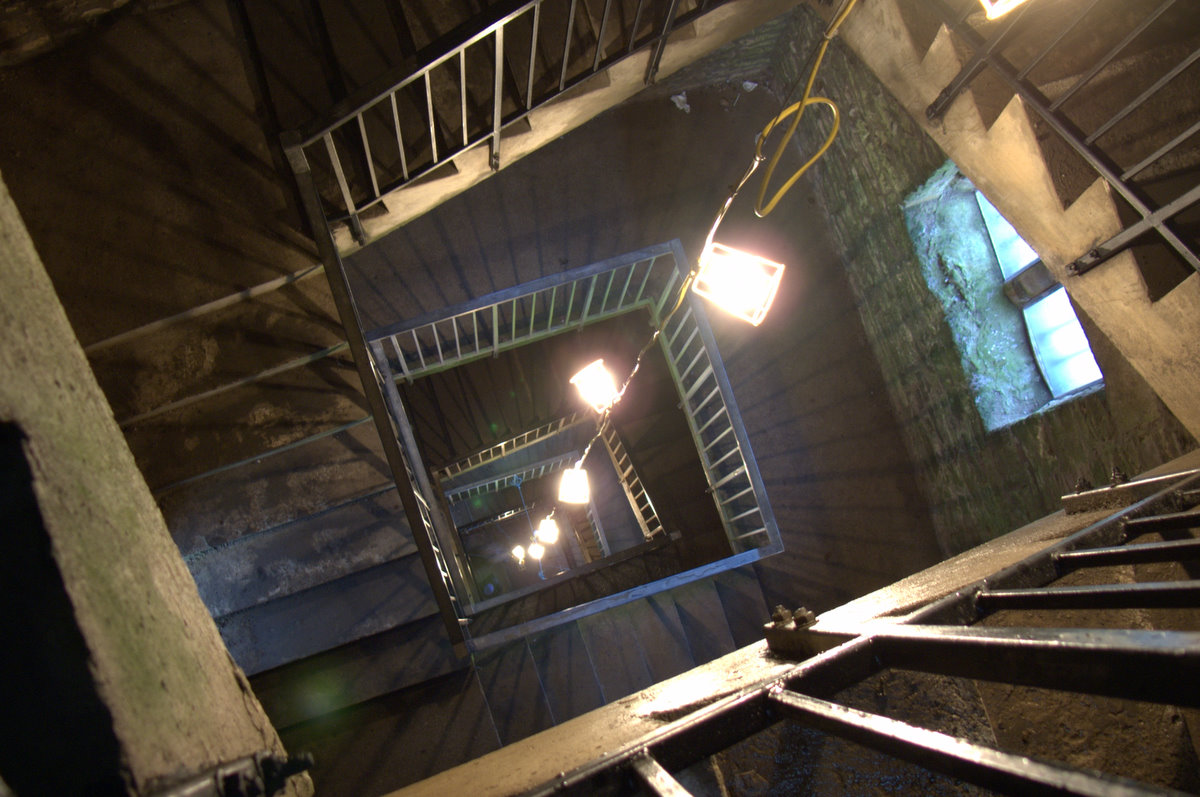
The staircases of the Peel Monument as seen from near its top

The tower was renovated in 1929 when the internal wooden staircase was replaced with iron. At this time an extract from Peel's speech to the House of Commons in 1846 was inscribed on a piece of marble and installed inside the tower.

In the 1930s, the running of the monument was taken over by a local farmer who charged an entrance fee to climb to the top. During World War II the tower was used as a lookout post, and soon after was closed to the public because of corrosion of the iron stairs and safety concerns. Ownership passed to Ramsbottom Borough Council, a new concrete staircase was installed, and the tower was eventually reopened and rededicated in November 1985 by Conservative Councillor Alice Maders. The monument is now owned by Bury Metropolitan Borough Council and occasionally open to the public on Sundays if the flag is flying at the top. The flag is managed by volunteers.

The tower was designated as a Grade II listed building in 1984.

== Trivia ==
There is a local tradition of egg rolling on Good Friday. The walk up the hill is said to symbolise Calvary where Jesus was crucified; the eggs are supposed to represent the stone being rolled away from his tomb. The longstanding tradition was suspended in 2020 and 2021 because of COVID restrictions, returning in 2022.

Less than a mile onto the moor behind the tower is another monument marking the site of the Pilgrims Cross, which was standing in 1176, and probably earlier.
