= List of United Kingdom locations: To–Tq =

The United Kingdom

This is part of the list of United Kingdom locations: a gazetteer of place names in the United Kingdom showing each place's locality and geographical coordinates.

== To ==
=== Toa–Tod ===
Location	Locality	Coordinates (links to map & photo sources)	OS grid reference
Toab	Shetland Islands	59.88°N 01.32°W	HU3811
Toadmoor	Derbyshire	53.04°N 01.47°W	SK3550
Toad Row	Suffolk	52.41°N 01.67°E	TM5086
Tobermory	Argyll and Bute	56.62°N 06.07°W	NM5055
Toberonochy	Argyll and Bute	56.21°N 05.64°W	NM7408
Tobha Beag	Western Isles	57.29°N 07.39°W	NF7535
Tobha Mòr	Western Isles	57.29°N 07.39°W	NF7536
Tobhtaral	Western Isles	58.19°N 06.80°W	NB1833
Tobson	Western Isles	58.23°N 06.89°W	NB1338
Toby's Hill	Lincolnshire	53.42°N 00.18°E	TF4594
Tocher	Aberdeenshire	57.37°N 02.51°W	NJ6932
Tockenham	Wiltshire	51.51°N 01.95°W	SU0379
Tockenham Wick	Wiltshire	51.52°N 01.95°W	SU0381
Tockholes	Lancashire	53.70°N 02.51°W	SD6623
Tockington	South Gloucestershire	51.57°N 02.57°W	ST6086
Tockwith	North Yorkshire	53.96°N 01.30°W	SE4652
Todber	Dorset	50.97°N 02.30°W	ST7920
Toddington	Bedfordshire	51.94°N 00.54°W	TL0028
Toddington	Gloucestershire	51.98°N 01.95°W	SP0332
Toddington	West Sussex	50.81°N 00.53°W	TQ0303
Toddlehills	Aberdeenshire	57.49°N 01.90°W	NK0645
Todd's Green	Hertfordshire	51.91°N 00.22°W	TL2226
Todenham	Gloucestershire	52.02°N 01.65°W	SP2436
Todhills	Angus	56.54°N 02.94°W	NO4239
Todhills	Cumbria	54.95°N 03.00°W	NY3663
Todhills	Durham	54.69°N 01.67°W	NZ2133
Todmorden	Calderdale	53.71°N 02.09°W	SD9424
Todpool	Cornwall	50.24°N 05.17°W	SW7443
Todwick	Rotherham	53.35°N 01.26°W	SK4984

=== Tof–Too ===
Location	Locality	Coordinates (links to map & photo sources)	OS grid reference
Toft	Cambridgeshire	52.18°N 00.01°W	TL3656
Toft	Lincolnshire	52.74°N 00.43°W	TF0617
Toft	Warwickshire	52.32°N 01.31°W	SP4770
Toft Hill	Durham	54.64°N 01.76°W	NZ1528
Toft Hill	Lincolnshire	53.14°N 00.14°W	TF2462
Toft Monks	Norfolk	52.49°N 01.56°E	TM4294
Toft next Newton	Lincolnshire	53.37°N 00.43°W	TF0488
Toftrees	Norfolk	52.80°N 00.80°E	TF8927
Toftshaw	Bradford	53.75°N 01.72°W	SE1829
Toftwood	Norfolk	52.66°N 00.94°E	TF9911
Togston	Northumberland	55.30°N 01.62°W	NU2401
Tokers Green	Oxfordshire	51.48°N 01.00°W	SU6977
Tokyngton	Brent	51.54°N 00.28°W	TQ1984
Tolastadh bho Thuath	Western Isles	58.34°N 06.22°W	NB5347
Tolborough	Cornwall	50.56°N 04.58°W	SX1777
Tolcarne	Cornwall	50.16°N 05.24°W	SW6834
Tolcarne	Cornwall	50.19°N 05.29°W	SW6538
Tolcarne Wartha	Cornwall	50.16°N 05.25°W	SW6835
Toldish	Cornwall	50.39°N 04.92°W	SW9259
Tolgus Mount	Cornwall	50.23°N 05.25°W	SW6842
Tolhurst	East Sussex	51.04°N 00.38°E	TQ6730
Tolladine	Worcestershire	52.19°N 02.20°W	SO8655
Tolland	Somerset	51.08°N 03.28°W	ST1032
Tollard Farnham	Dorset	50.93°N 02.08°W	ST9415
Tollard Royal	Wiltshire	50.95°N 02.08°W	ST9417
Toll Bar	Doncaster	53.55°N 01.15°W	SE5607
Toll Bar	Rutland	52.66°N 00.52°W	TF0008
Toll Bar	St Helens	53.44°N 02.76°W	SJ4994
Tollbar End	Warwickshire	52.37°N 01.47°W	SP3675
Toll End	Sandwell	52.52°N 02.04°W	SO9792
Tollerford	Dorset	50.77°N 02.58°W	SY5997
Toller Fratrum	Dorset	50.77°N 02.61°W	SY5797
Toller Porcorum	Dorset	50.78°N 02.62°W	SY5698
Tollerton	North Yorkshire	54.06°N 01.22°W	SE5164
Tollerton	Nottinghamshire	52.90°N 01.10°W	SK6034
Toller Whelme	Dorset	50.80°N 02.69°W	ST5101
Tollesbury	Essex	51.75°N 00.82°E	TL9510
Tollesby	Middlesbrough	54.52°N 01.21°W	NZ5115
Tolleshunt D'Arcy	Essex	51.76°N 00.78°E	TL9211
Tolleshunt Knights	Essex	51.79°N 00.76°E	TL9114
Tolleshunt Major	Essex	51.76°N 00.75°E	TL9011
Tollingham	East Riding of Yorkshire	53.81°N 00.74°W	SE8335
Tolm / Holm	Western Isles	58.19°N 06.34°W	NB4531
Tolmers	Hertfordshire	51.71°N 00.11°W	TL3003
Tolpuddle	Dorset	50.74°N 02.29°W	SY7994
Tolskithy	Cornwall	50.22°N 05.25°W	SW6841
Tolsta Chaolais	Western Isles	58.24°N 06.79°W	NB1938
Tolsta Head	Western Isles	58.34°N 06.17°W	NB557469
Tolvaddon Downs	Cornwall	50.23°N 05.29°W	SW6542
Tolvah	Highland	57.06°N 03.91°W	NN8499
Tolworth	Kingston upon Thames	51.37°N 00.29°W	TQ1965
Tomaknock	Perth and Kinross	56.36°N 03.83°W	NN8721
Tom an Fhuadain	Western Isles	58.03°N 06.42°W	NB3914
Tomatin	Highland	57.32°N 03.99°W	NH8028
Tomich	Highland	57.30°N 04.82°W	NH3027
Tomintoul	Aberdeenshire	56.99°N 03.41°W	NO1490
Tomintoul	Moray	57.24°N 03.39°W	NJ1618
Tomlow	Warwickshire	52.26°N 01.34°W	SP4563
Tomnavoulin	Moray	57.31°N 03.31°W	NJ2126
Tomperrow	Cornwall	50.25°N 05.13°W	SW7744
Tompkin	Staffordshire	53.05°N 02.09°W	SJ9451
Tompset's Bank	East Sussex	51.07°N 00.02°E	TQ4233
Tomthorn	Derbyshire	53.27°N 01.89°W	SK0775

=== Ton–Tor ===
Location	Locality	Coordinates (links to map & photo sources)	OS grid reference
Ton	Monmouthshire	51.65°N 02.92°W	ST3696
Ton-Breigam	The Vale Of Glamorgan	51.50°N 03.45°W	SS9979
Tonbridge	Kent	51.19°N 00.27°E	TQ5946
Tondu	Bridgend	51.54°N 03.60°W	SS8984
Tone	Somerset	50.99°N 03.24°W	ST1221
Tonedale	Somerset	50.98°N 03.25°W	ST1221
Tone Green	Somerset	51.00°N 03.18°W	ST1723
Tong	Bradford	53.76°N 01.66°W	SE2230
Tong	Kent	51.18°N 00.61°E	TQ8346
Tong	Shropshire	52.66°N 02.31°W	SJ7907
Tonge	Leicestershire	52.80°N 01.39°W	SK4123
Tonge Corner	Kent	51.35°N 00.77°E	TQ9365
Tonge Fold	Bolton	53.57°N 02.40°W	SD7309
Tonge Moor	Bolton	53.58°N 02.42°W	SD7210
Tong Forge	Shropshire	52.66°N 02.32°W	SJ7808
Tong Green	Kent	51.25°N 00.83°E	TQ9854
Tongham	Surrey	51.23°N 00.74°W	SU8849
Tongland	Dumfries and Galloway	54.86°N 04.04°W	NX6954
Tong Norton	Shropshire	52.66°N 02.31°W	SJ7908
Tong Park	Bradford	53.84°N 01.75°W	SE1639
Tong Street	Bradford	53.76°N 01.71°W	SE1930
Tongue	Highland	58.47°N 04.41°W	NC5956
Tongue End	Lincolnshire	52.74°N 00.28°W	TF1618
Tongwell	Milton Keynes	52.06°N 00.73°W	SP8741
Tongwynlais	Cardiff	51.53°N 03.25°W	ST1382
Tonmawr	Neath Port Talbot	51.65°N 03.73°W	SS8096
Tonna	Neath Port Talbot	51.67°N 03.78°W	SS7799
Ton Pentre	Rhondda, Cynon, Taff	51.64°N 03.50°W	SS9695
Tonteg	Rhondda, Cynon, Taff	51.56°N 03.31°W	ST0986
Tontine	Lancashire	53.53°N 02.72°W	SD5204
Tonwell	Hertfordshire	51.83°N 00.07°W	TL3317
Tonypandy	Rhondda, Cynon, Taff	51.61°N 03.46°W	SS9992
Ton-y-pistyll	Caerphilly	51.65°N 03.17°W	ST1996
Tonyrefail	Rhondda, Cynon, Taff	51.58°N 03.43°W	ST0188
Toogs	Shetland Islands	60.08°N 01.33°W	HU3733
Toot Baldon	Oxfordshire	51.69°N 01.19°W	SP5600
Toothill	Calderdale	53.68°N 01.78°W	SE1421
Toothill	Hampshire	50.96°N 01.47°W	SU3718
Toothill	Swindon	51.54°N 01.82°W	SU1283
Toot Hill	Essex	51.69°N 00.18°E	TL5102
Toot Hill	Staffordshire	52.97°N 01.91°W	SK0642
Tooting Graveney	Wandsworth	51.42°N 00.17°W	TQ2771
Topcliffe	Leeds	53.73°N 01.59°W	SE2726
Topcliffe	North Yorkshire	54.17°N 01.38°W	SE4076
Topcroft	Norfolk	52.47°N 01.32°E	TM2692
Topcroft Street	Norfolk	52.47°N 01.32°E	TM2691
Top End	Bedfordshire	52.24°N 00.49°W	TL0362
Top Green	Nottinghamshire	52.99°N 00.86°W	SK7645
Topham	Doncaster	53.64°N 01.06°W	SE6217
Topleigh	West Sussex	50.95°N 00.70°W	SU9118
Top Lock	Wigan	53.54°N 02.60°W	SD6006
Top of Hebers	Rochdale	53.55°N 02.21°W	SD8607
Top o' th' Lane	Lancashire	53.70°N 02.62°W	SD5923
Top o' th' Meadows	Oldham	53.55°N 02.06°W	SD9606
Toppesfield	Essex	52.00°N 00.51°E	TL7337
Toppings	Bolton	53.61°N 02.42°W	SD7213
Toprow	Norfolk	52.53°N 01.18°E	TM1698
Topsham	Devon	50.68°N 03.47°W	SX9688
Top Valley	Nottinghamshire	52.99°N 01.18°W	SK5545
Tor	Devon	50.42°N 03.95°W	SX6160
Torbay	Devon	50.43°N 03.56°W	SX8961
Torbeg	North Ayrshire	55.51°N 05.32°W	NR9029
Torbothie	North Lanarkshire	55.81°N 03.77°W	NS8959
Torbrex	Stirling	56.10°N 03.96°W	NS7892
Torbryan	Devon	50.48°N 03.66°W	SX8266
Torbush	North Lanarkshire	55.77°N 03.86°W	NS8355
Torcross	Devon	50.26°N 03.65°W	SX8242
Tore	Highland	57.53°N 04.34°W	NH6052
Torfrey	Cornwall	50.35°N 04.65°W	SX1154
Torgulbin	Highland	56.90°N 04.57°W	NN4382
Torinturk	Argyll and Bute	55.82°N 05.49°W	NR8165
Torkington	Stockport	53.37°N 02.10°W	SJ9386
Torksey	Lincolnshire	53.29°N 00.75°W	SK8378
Torlum	Western Isles	57.42°N 07.36°W	NF7850
Torlundy	Highland	56.83°N 05.05°W	NN1476
Tormarton	South Gloucestershire	51.50°N 02.34°W	ST7678
Tormore	Highland	57.03°N 05.94°W	NG6101
Tormore	North Ayrshire	55.53°N 05.34°W	NR8932
Tornagrain	Highland	57.51°N 04.07°W	NH7649
Tornaveen	Aberdeenshire	57.14°N 02.64°W	NJ6106
Torness	Highland	57.31°N 04.35°W	NH5827
Toronto	Durham	54.66°N 01.70°W	NZ1930
Torpenhow	Cumbria	54.74°N 03.24°W	NY2039
Torphichen	West Lothian	55.93°N 03.66°W	NS9672
Torphin	City of Edinburgh	55.89°N 03.28°W	NT2067
Torphins	Aberdeenshire	57.09°N 02.62°W	NJ6201
Torpoint	Cornwall	50.37°N 04.20°W	SX4355
Torquay	Devon	50.47°N 03.53°W	SX9165
Torquhan	Scottish Borders	55.71°N 02.89°W	NT4447
Torr	Devon	50.34°N 03.99°W	SX5851
Torran	Highland	57.46°N 06.02°W	NG5949
Torrance	East Dunbartonshire	55.93°N 04.21°W	NS6274
Torranyard	North Ayrshire	55.66°N 04.62°W	NS3544
Torre	Devon	50.46°N 03.55°W	SX9064
Torre	Somerset	51.15°N 03.37°W	ST0440
Torridon	Highland	57.54°N 05.52°W	NG8956
Torridon	Highland	57.53°N 05.51°W	NG9055
Torries	Aberdeenshire	57.20°N 02.64°W	NJ6113
Torrieston	Moray	57.60°N 03.40°W	NJ1658
Torrin	Highland	57.20°N 06.02°W	NG5720
Torrinch	West Dunbartonshire	56.06°N 04.56°W	NS403892
Torrisdale	Highland	58.51°N 04.28°W	NC6761
Torrisholme	Lancashire	54.06°N 02.84°W	SD4564
Torroble	Highland	58.00°N 04.40°W	NC5804
Torroy	Highland	57.93°N 04.46°W	NH5497
Torry	City of Aberdeen	57.13°N 02.08°W	NJ9505
Torryburn	Fife	56.05°N 03.57°W	NT0286
Torrylinn	North Ayrshire	55.44°N 05.24°W	NR9521
Torsa	Argyll and Bute	56.25°N 05.61°W	NM764127
Torsonce	Scottish Borders	55.67°N 02.87°W	NT4543
Torsonce Mains	Scottish Borders	55.67°N 02.87°W	NT4543
Torterston	Aberdeenshire	57.51°N 01.88°W	NK0747
Torthorwald	Dumfries and Galloway	55.08°N 03.52°W	NY0378
Tortington	West Sussex	50.83°N 00.58°W	TQ0005
Torton	Worcestershire	52.34°N 02.23°W	SO8472
Tortworth	South Gloucestershire	51.63°N 02.43°W	ST7093
Torvaig	Highland	57.41°N 06.18°W	NG4944
Torver	Cumbria	54.33°N 03.10°W	SD2894
Torwood	Falkirk	56.03°N 03.86°W	NS8484
Torwoodlee Mains	Scottish Borders	55.62°N 02.85°W	NT4637
Torworth	Nottinghamshire	53.36°N 01.02°W	SK6586

=== Tos–Toy ===
Location	Locality	Coordinates (links to map & photo sources)	OS grid reference
Tosberry	Devon	50.96°N 04.47°W	SS2621
Toscaig	Highland	57.37°N 05.81°W	NG7138
Toseland	Cambridgeshire	52.24°N 00.19°W	TL2362
Tosside	Lancashire	53.99°N 02.36°W	SD7656
Tostary	Argyll and Bute	56.52°N 06.24°W	NM3945
Tostock	Suffolk	52.23°N 00.85°E	TL9563
Totaig	Highland	57.45°N 06.68°W	NG1950
Totardor	Highland	57.36°N 06.37°W	NG3739
Tote	Highland	57.45°N 06.32°W	NG4149
Totegan	Highland	58.58°N 04.03°W	NC8268
Tote Hill	Hampshire	51.01°N 01.57°W	SU3024
Tote Hill	West Sussex	51.00°N 00.77°W	SU8624
Totford	Hampshire	51.12°N 01.18°W	SU5737
Totham Hill	Essex	51.77°N 00.70°E	TL8712
Totham Plains	Essex	51.77°N 00.72°E	TL8812
Tot Hill	Hampshire	51.35°N 01.34°W	SU4662
Tothill	Lincolnshire	53.30°N 00.11°E	TF4181
Totland	Isle of Wight	50.67°N 01.54°W	SZ3286
Totley	Sheffield	53.30°N 01.55°W	SK3079
Totley Brook	Sheffield	53.31°N 01.53°W	SK3180
Totley Rise	Sheffield	53.31°N 01.52°W	SK3280
Totmonslow	Staffordshire	52.94°N 02.01°W	SJ9939
Totnell	Dorset	50.87°N 02.54°W	ST6208
Totnes	Devon	50.42°N 03.69°W	SX8060
Totnor	Herefordshire	51.97°N 02.59°W	SO5931
Toton	Nottinghamshire	52.90°N 01.25°W	SK5034
Totscore	Highland	57.60°N 06.38°W	NG3866
Tottenham	Haringey	51.59°N 00.08°W	TQ3390
Tottenham Hale	Haringey	51.58°N 00.06°W	TQ3489
Tottenhill	Norfolk	52.66°N 00.42°E	TF6410
Tottenhill Row	Norfolk	52.68°N 00.41°E	TF6312
Totteridge	Barnet	51.63°N 00.20°W	TQ2494
Totteridge	Buckinghamshire	51.62°N 00.72°W	SU8893
Totternhoe	Bedfordshire	51.87°N 00.57°W	SP9821
Totteroak	South Gloucestershire	51.55°N 02.37°W	ST7484
Totterton	Shropshire	52.47°N 02.94°W	SO3687
Totties	Kirklees	53.56°N 01.77°W	SE1508
Tottington	Bury	53.60°N 02.34°W	SD7712
Tottington	Norfolk	52.52°N 00.78°E	TL8995
Tottlebank	Cumbria	54.24°N 03.06°W	SD3184
Tottleworth	Lancashire	53.77°N 02.41°W	SD7331
Totton	Hampshire	50.91°N 01.50°W	SU3513
Touchen-end	Berkshire	51.47°N 00.74°W	SU8776
Toulston	North Yorkshire	53.89°N 01.31°W	SE4544
Toulton	Somerset	51.07°N 03.15°W	ST1931
Toulvaddie	Highland	57.79°N 03.88°W	NH8880
Tournaig	Highland	57.78°N 05.58°W	NG8783
Tovil	Kent	51.25°N 00.50°E	TQ7554
Towan	Cornwall	50.52°N 05.00°W	SW8774
Towan Cross	Cornwall	50.28°N 05.23°W	SW7048
Towan Head	Cornwall	50.42°N 05.10°W	SW798626
Toward	Argyll and Bute	55.86°N 04.99°W	NS1368
Toward Point	Argyll and Bute	55.86°N 04.98°W	NS134674
Towcester	Northamptonshire	52.12°N 00.99°W	SP6948
Towednack	Cornwall	50.18°N 05.53°W	SW4838
Towerage	Buckinghamshire	51.63°N 00.81°W	SU8293
Tower End	Norfolk	52.72°N 00.45°E	TF6617
Tower Hamlets	Kent	51.12°N 01.28°E	TR3041
Towerhead	North Somerset	51.32°N 02.84°W	ST4159
Tower Hill	Birmingham	52.52°N 01.92°W	SP0592
Tower Hill	Cheshire	53.27°N 02.09°W	SJ9475
Tower Hill	Devon	50.68°N 04.30°W	SX3790
Tower Hill	Essex	51.94°N 01.28°E	TM2632
Tower Hill	Hertfordshire	51.70°N 00.51°W	TL0302
Tower Hill	Knowsley	53.49°N 02.89°W	SD4100
Tower Hill	Surrey	51.21°N 00.34°W	TQ1648
Tower Hill	West Sussex	51.04°N 00.34°W	TQ1629
Tower Point	Pembrokeshire	51.75°N 05.19°W	SM798107
Towersey	Oxfordshire	51.73°N 00.94°W	SP7305
Tow House	Northumberland	54.97°N 02.37°W	NY7664
Towie	Aberdeenshire	57.19°N 02.94°W	NJ4312
Towiemore	Moray	57.49°N 03.01°W	NJ3945
Tow Law	Durham	54.73°N 01.83°W	NZ1138
Town Barton	Devon	50.73°N 03.70°W	SX8094
Town Centre (Skelmersdale)	Lancashire	53.54°N 02.78°W	SD4806
Town Centre (Telford)	Shropshire	52.66°N 02.45°W	SJ6908
Town End	Buckinghamshire	51.66°N 00.87°W	SU7897
Town End	Cambridgeshire	52.53°N 00.07°E	TL4195
Town End (Grasmere)	Cumbria	54.44°N 03.01°W	NY3406
Town End (Troutbeck)	Cumbria	54.41°N 02.92°W	NY4002
Town End (Kirkby Thore)	Cumbria	54.61°N 02.57°W	NY6325
Town End (Hawkshead)	Cumbria	54.37°N 03.00°W	SD3598
Town End (Finsthwaite)	Cumbria	54.27°N 02.98°W	SD3687
Town End (Witherslack)	Cumbria	54.24°N 02.86°W	SD4483
Town End (Barbon)	Cumbria	54.23°N 02.58°W	SD6282
Town End	Derbyshire	53.27°N 01.77°W	SK1575
Town End	Kirklees	53.63°N 01.86°W	SE0915
Town End	Knowsley	53.38°N 02.76°W	SJ4988
Town End	York	53.96°N 00.93°W	SE7053
Townend	Derbyshire	53.32°N 01.91°W	SK0681
Townend	Staffordshire	52.93°N 02.07°W	SJ9537
Townend	West Dunbartonshire	55.95°N 04.56°W	NS4076
Townfield	Durham	54.82°N 02.07°W	NY9548
Town Fields	Cheshire	53.18°N 02.54°W	SJ6465
Towngate	Cumbria	54.80°N 02.74°W	NY5246
Towngate	Lincolnshire	52.67°N 00.32°W	TF1310
Town Green	Lancashire	53.53°N 02.90°W	SD4005
Town Green	Norfolk	52.65°N 01.48°E	TG3612
Town Green	Wigan	53.48°N 02.63°W	SJ5899
Townhead	Aberdeenshire	56.83°N 02.29°W	NO8272
Townhead	Argyll and Bute	55.82°N 05.06°W	NS0863
Townhead	Barnsley	53.51°N 01.76°W	SE1602
Townhead (Dearham)	Cumbria	54.70°N 03.44°W	NY0735
Townhead (Lazonby)	Cumbria	54.74°N 02.71°W	NY5439
Townhead (Ousby)	Cumbria	54.70°N 02.57°W	NY6334
Townhead	Dumfries and Galloway	54.79°N 04.03°W	NX6946
Townhead	City of Glasgow	55.85°N 04.25°W	NS5965
Townhead	North Lanarkshire	55.87°N 04.06°W	NS7166
Townhead	Northumberland	55.23°N 02.19°W	NY8893
Townhead	Sheffield	53.32°N 01.55°W	SK3081
Townhead	South Ayrshire	55.28°N 04.82°W	NS2103
Town Head	Bradford	53.91°N 01.94°W	SE0446
Town Head (Grasmere)	Cumbria	54.47°N 03.03°W	NY3309
Town Head (Troutbeck)	Cumbria	54.41°N 02.91°W	NY4103
Town Head (Cliburn)	Cumbria	54.61°N 02.65°W	NY5825
Town Head (Morland)	Cumbria	54.59°N 02.62°W	NY6022
Town Head (Crosby Ravensworth)	Cumbria	54.52°N 02.58°W	NY6214
Town Head (Kirkby Thore)	Cumbria	54.61°N 02.55°W	NY6425
Town Head (Great Asby)	Cumbria	54.50°N 02.51°W	NY6712
Town Head (Dufton)	Cumbria	54.61°N 02.48°W	NY6924
Town Head	Derbyshire	53.28°N 01.77°W	SK1576
Town Head (Austwick)	North Yorkshire	54.10°N 02.35°W	SD7768
Town Head (Long Preston)	North Yorkshire	54.01°N 02.27°W	SD8258
Town Head	Staffordshire	53.03°N 01.94°W	SK0449
Townhead of Greenlaw	Dumfries and Galloway	54.95°N 03.96°W	NX7464
Townhill	Fife	56.08°N 03.44°W	NT1089
Townhill	Swansea	51.61°N 03.98°W	SS6393
Townhill Park	City of Southampton	50.92°N 01.36°W	SU4514
Town Kelloe	Durham	54.71°N 01.45°W	NZ3536
Townlake	Devon	50.54°N 04.25°W	SX4074
Townland Green	Kent	51.07°N 00.76°E	TQ9434
Town Lane	Wigan	53.48°N 02.46°W	SJ6999
Town Littleworth	East Sussex	50.94°N 00.01°E	TQ4118
Town of Lowton	St Helens	53.45°N 02.60°W	SJ6095
Town Park	Shropshire	52.66°N 02.45°W	SJ6908
Town Row	East Sussex	51.04°N 00.22°E	TQ5630
Townsend	Bath and North East Somerset	51.30°N 02.61°W	ST5756
Townsend	Buckinghamshire	51.77°N 00.92°W	SP7409
Townsend	Devon	51.00°N 03.95°W	SS6325
Townsend	Hertfordshire	51.75°N 00.34°W	TL1408
Townsend	Oxfordshire	51.58°N 01.45°W	SU3887
Townsend	Pembrokeshire	51.71°N 05.17°W	SM8106
Townsend	Somerset	51.25°N 02.68°W	ST5251
Townsend	City of Stoke-on-Trent	53.02°N 02.13°W	SJ9147
Townsend (Poulshot)	Wiltshire	51.32°N 02.05°W	ST9658
Townsend (Urchfont)	Wiltshire	51.30°N 01.94°W	SU0456
Town's End	Buckinghamshire	51.89°N 01.07°W	SP6422
Town's End (Melbury Osmond)	Dorset	50.86°N 02.61°W	ST5707
Town's End (Bere Regis)	Dorset	50.75°N 02.21°W	SY8595
Town's End (Corfe Castle)	Dorset	50.62°N 02.05°W	SY9681
Town's End	Somerset	51.22°N 02.45°W	ST6847
Towns End	Hampshire	51.31°N 01.19°W	SU5658
Towns End	Somerset	50.96°N 02.40°W	ST7219
Townsend Fold	Lancashire	53.68°N 02.30°W	SD8021
Townshend	Cornwall	50.13°N 05.37°W	SW5932
Town Street	Gloucestershire	51.95°N 02.23°W	SO8429
Townwell	South Gloucestershire	51.60°N 02.44°W	ST6990
Town Yetholm	Scottish Borders	55.54°N 02.30°W	NT8128
Towthorpe	East Riding of Yorkshire	54.04°N 00.62°W	SE9062
Towthorpe	York	54.01°N 01.03°W	SE6358
Towton	North Yorkshire	53.84°N 01.27°W	SE4839
Towyn	Conwy	53.29°N 03.54°W	SH9779
Toxteth	Liverpool	53.38°N 02.97°W	SJ3588
Toynton All Saints	Lincolnshire	53.14°N 00.07°E	TF3963
Toynton Fen Side	Lincolnshire	53.13°N 00.07°E	TF3962
Toynton St Peter	Lincolnshire	53.14°N 00.09°E	TF4063
Toys Hill or Toy's Hill	Kent	51.23°N 00.10°E	TQ4751
