= Toot Hill =

Toot Hill or Toothill may refer to:

== Places ==
=== England ===
- Toot Hill, Essex, a village
- Toothill, Swindon, a suburb of Swindon, Wiltshire
- Toothill, West Yorkshire, a settlement in West Yorkshire; see List of United Kingdom locations: To-Tq
- Toot Hill, Staffordshire, a settlement in Staffordshire; see List of United Kingdom locations: To-Tq
- Toot Hill ridge, Nottinghamshire; see Bingham Wapentake
- Toot Hill School, a school in Bingham, Nottinghamshire
- Toothill, Hampshire, a settlement in Hampshire; see List of United Kingdom locations: To-Tq
- Toothill Fort, or Toothill Ring, or Toothill camp, the site of an Iron Age univallate hillfort in Hampshire

== People ==
- John Toothill (1866–1947), English rugby union footballer
- John Toothill (industrialist) (1908–1986), English electrical engineer

== See also ==
- Todt Hill, Staten Island, New York, US
- Tootill, surname
- Tootle, a children's book
- Tothill, a hamlet in Lincolnshire, England
- Tuthill (disambiguation)
