= Alf Tootill =

Alf Tootill may refer to:

- Alf Tootill (footballer, born 1908) (1908–1975), English football goalkeeper
- Alf Tootill (footballer, born 1913) (1913–1984), English football defender
