= Tuthill =

Tuthill may refer to:

== People with the surname ==
- Anna Tuthill Symmes or Anna Harrison (1775–1864), wife of President William Henry Harrison and grandmother of President Benjamin Harrison
- David Tuthill Jennings (born 1952), former American football punter
- George Leman Tuthill (1772–1835), English physician
- Harry J. Tuthill (1886–1957), American cartoonist known for his comic strip The Bungle Family
- James Tuthill (born 1976), former American football placekicker
- John W. Tuthill (1910–1996), American diplomat stationed in Latin America, Canada, and Europe
- Joseph H. Tuthill (1811–1877), U.S. Representative from New York, nephew of Selah Tuthill
- Kathleen Villiers-Tuthill, Irish historical writer
- Louisa Caroline Huggins Tuthill (1799–1879), American author of children's books
- Mary Tuthill Lindheim (1912–2004), born Mary Barbara Tuthill, American sculptor and studio potter
- Selah Tuthill (1771–1821), American politician from New York
- William Tuthill (1855–1929), American architect celebrated for designing New York City's Carnegie Hall

== Places ==
- Tuthill, South Dakota, unincorporated community in Bennett County, South Dakota, United States
- Tuthill Quarry, Site of Special Scientific Interest in the Easington district of north-east County Durham, England

== See also ==
- Battle of Tuthill took place at Caernarfon in 1401 during the revolt of Owain Glyndŵr
- David Tuthill Farmstead, historic farm complex at Cutchogue in Suffolk County, New York
- Jesse and Ira Tuthill House, historic home at Mattituck in Suffolk County, New York
- Tuthill-Green House, historic home at Moravia in Cayuga County, New York
- Tuthill-Lapham House, also known as Friendly Hall, historic home at Wading River in Suffolk County, New York
- Duthil
- Titty Hill
- Todt Hill
- Toot Hill (disambiguation)
- Tothill
- Tothill (surname)
- Tutt Hill, Bracelet Bay, Wales
