= Tootill =

Tootill is a surname. Notable people with the surname include:

- Alf Tootill (footballer, born 1908) (1908–1975), English football goalkeeper
- Alf Tootill (footballer, born 1913) (1913–1984), English football defender
- David Tootill (born 1986), English rugby player
- Geoff Tootill (1922–2017), English electronic engineer and computer scientist
- Robert Tootill (1850–1934), British politician
