= Tollbar (disambiguation) =

A tollbar is a barrier across a toll road.

Tollbar or Toll Bar may also refer to:

- Tollbar Academy, a school in New Waltham, North East Lincolnshire, England
- Toll Bar, a village in the borough of Doncaster, South Yorkshire, England
- Toll Bar, Merseyside, a location in England
- Toll Bar, Rutland, a location in England
- Tollbar End, a roundabout on the A45 road, Coventry, England
