= Tower Hill (disambiguation) =

Tower Hill may refer to:

== Places ==
Australia

- Tower Hill (volcano), Victoria, Australia
- Tower Hill Wildlife Reserve, Victoria, Australia

Belize

- Tower Hill, Belize, a village in Orange Walk District

Sierra Leone

- Tower Hill (Sierra Leone), a neighborhood in Freetown

United Kingdom

- Tower Hill, an elevated spot outside the Tower of London
  - Tower Hill Memorial, a war memorial on Tower Hill in London
  - Tower Hill tube station, a London Underground station situated at Tower Hill on the District Line
- Tower Hill, Cheshire, a location
- Tower Hill, Devon, a location
  - Tower Hill railway station (Devon), a former station
- Tower Hill, Essex, a location
- Tower Hill, Hertfordshire, a location
- Tower Hill, Kirkby, Merseyside, a location
- Tower Hill, Surrey, a location
- Tower Hill, West Midlands, an area of Great Barr, Birmingham
- Tower Hill, West Sussex, a location
- Tower Hill (Abergele), in Abergele, North Wales

United States

- Tower Hill, Illinois, a village
- Tower Hill Park, in Minneapolis, Minnesota
- Tower Hill Township, Shelby County, Illinois

== Other uses ==
- Tower Hill (Staten Island Railway station)
- New England Botanic Garden at Tower Hill, in Boylston, Massachusetts, United States
- Tower Hill School, in Wilmington, Delaware, United States
- Tower Hill State Game Reserve, in Victoria, Australia
