= St Paul's Church, Ramsbottom =

Church in Greater Manchester, England

Coordinates: 53°38′55″N 2°18′58″W

St Paul's Church
- The Parish Ramsbottom, St John and St Paul
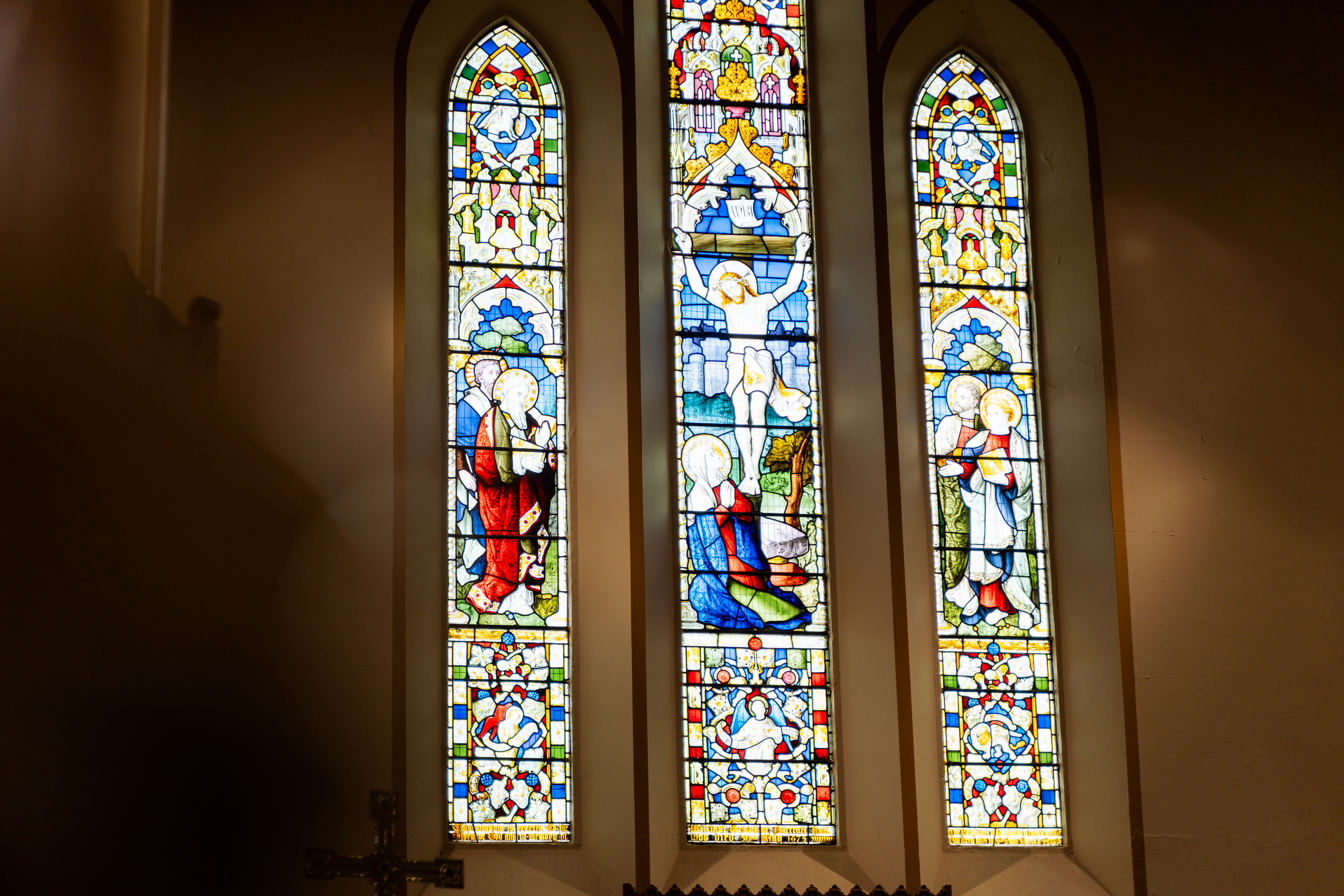
- Stained Glass in St Pauls Church
- OS grid reference: SD 79201 16937
- Location: Bury
- Country: England
- Denomination: Church of England
- Churchmanship: Broad Church
- Website: Church website

History
- Dedication: St. Paul
- Consecrated: 23 Oct 1850

Architecture
- Functional status: Active
- Heritage designation: Grade II Listed
- Designated: 29 Jan 1985
- Style: Early English style
- Groundbreaking: 23 May 1844

Administration
- Province: York
- Diocese: Manchester
- Archdeaconry: Manchester
- Parish: Ramsbottom

Clergy
- Bishop: Matthew Porter
- Priest: Rev. Ian Fleming

St Paul's Church is a Church of England parish church in Ramsbottom, Bury, England. The Church is also known more completely as The Church of the Parish of Ramsbottom, St John and St Paul. It serves as an important religious and cultural landmark in the area.

== Architecture and history ==
St Paul's Church was established in 1844, reflecting the growth of Ramsbottom during the Industrial Revolution. Consecrated in 1850, it has been a pivotal part of the community for over a century, witnessing and adapting to various historical events and societal changes. The church has undergone structural and administrative transformations while maintaining its traditional values and practices.

The church exhibits architectural features characteristic of its era. Its design is a testament to the religious and cultural aesthetics of the mid-19th century, with notable elements in its interior and exterior that attract both parishioners and architectural enthusiasts. Standing the test of time, the church building is Grade II Listed, this includes the beautiful Organ within.

In January 2024, Rev. Ian Fleming was appointed as the team rector, signifying a new phase in the church's leadership and direction. Rev. Fleming had been curate for several years, and has been formally recognised by the parish, diocese and crown in the licensing.

== Role in community ==
St Paul's Church plays an integral role in the Ramsbottom community. It has been involved in various community services, providing spiritual guidance, and fostering a sense of unity and support among its congregation. The church also adapts to modern needs while preserving its traditional values. The Church seeks to enable multiple events throughout the year which don't simply enable the church to survive financially but also further its work. Such events include a Cafe every Saturday morning, an impressive Jigsaw festival each September and a large brass band event, whilst also being the heart of the community for events such as Remembrance Day. The church also actively encourages and trains local people to become bell ringers.
