= Tothill (surname) =

Tothill is an English surname. Notable people with this name include:

- Sir Hugh Tothill (1865–1927), Royal Navy officer
- Jev Tothill (born 1928 or 1929), Canadian politician
- John Douglas Tothill (1888–1969), English entomologist in Canada
- Syd Tothill, founder of Syd's coffee stall in London

== See also ==
- Tuthill (disambiguation), which includes a list of people with that surname
