= Strathy Point Lighthouse =

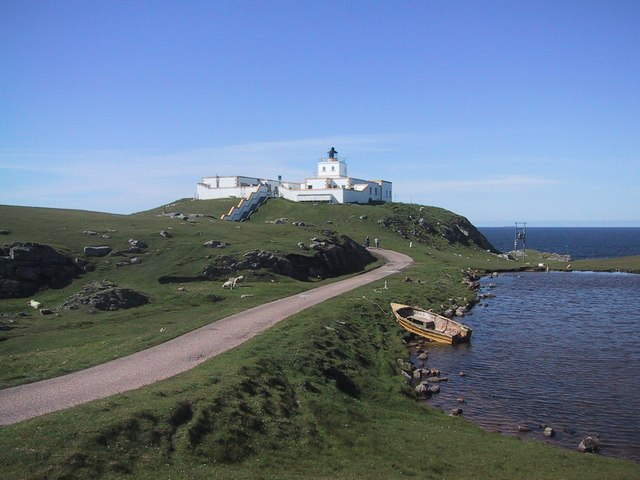
- Strathy Point Lighthouse in July 2007
- Location: Strathy Point; Highland; Scotland; United Kingdom
- Coordinates: 58.598752°N 4.018545°W

Tower
- Constructed: 1958
- Designed by: Peter H. Hyslop
- Construction: masonry tower
- Automated: 1997
- Height: 14 metres (46 ft)
- Shape: quadrangular tower on the top of the keeper’s house
- Markings: white tower, black lantern, ochre trim
- Operator: private

Light
- Deactivated: 2012
- Focal height: 45 metres (148 ft)
- Range: 26 nautical miles (48 km; 30 mi)
- Characteristic: Fl W 20s.

Strathy Point Lighthouse is a remote former lighthouse located on the north coast of Sutherland, Scotland, and is situated on the coast close to the settlement of Totegan and the village of Strathy. Strathy Point was the first lighthouse in Scotland specifically built to be electrically operated.

The lighthouse was initially planned in 1953 and was completed by 1958. The lighting device itself was a two panel device with a focal length of 250mm with a 250watt light bulb, that gave a range of almost 26 miles. The lighthouse was originally fitted with a fog horn, which is no longer used.

The Station was fully automated in 1997 and was then telemetered from the Northern Lighthouse Board Headquarters in Edinburgh until it was decommissioned in 2012. It has since been converted for residential use.

== See also ==
- List of lighthouses in Scotland
- List of Northern Lighthouse Board lighthouses
