= Ramsbottom =

Town in Rossendale, England

Coordinates: 53°38′54″N 2°19′00″W

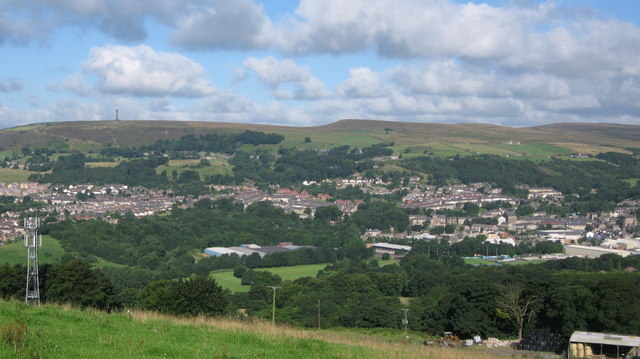
- A view of Ramsbottom in 2008

- Location within Greater Manchester
- Population: 17,067 (2021 census)
- OS grid reference: SD790169
  - London: 174 mi (280 km) SSE
- Metropolitan borough: Bury
- Metropolitan county: Greater Manchester
- Region: North West
- Country: England
- Sovereign state: United Kingdom
- Post town: BURY
- Postcode district: BL0, BL8
- Dialling code: 01706
- Police: Greater Manchester
- Fire: Greater Manchester
- Ambulance: North West
- UK Parliament: Bury North

Ramsbottom is a market town in the Metropolitan Borough of Bury, Greater Manchester, England. The population at the 2011 census was 17,872. Historically in Lancashire, it lies on the River Irwell in the West Pennine Moors, 3.9 miles (6.3 km) north-west of Bury and 12 miles (19 km) of Manchester. Its Victorian architecture, Pennine landscape and industrial heritage, including the East Lancashire Railway, contribute to heritage tourism in the town.

== History ==
=== Toponymy ===
The name either means 'ram's valley' from the Old English ramm, 'a ram' and botm, 'a valley' but could mean a 'wild garlic valley', with the first element representing the Old English hramsa meaning 'wild garlic'. A record from 1324 recording the name as Ramesbothum is inconclusive. The town was alternatively recorded as Ramysbothom in 1540.

=== Early history ===
Evidence of prehistoric human activity has been discovered in the hills surrounding the town. Early records show that in Norman times Ramsbottom was part of the Forest of Rossendale. There are a number of Bronze Age burial sites around the town, the most notable of which is Whitelow Cairn, one mile (1.6 km) south-east of the town centre and three miles (4.8 km) north of Bury. The cairn was excavated by Bury Archaeological Group between 1960–62, under the leadership of Norman Tyson. Finds include one main and seven secondary cremations, four in urns, dating to the mid Bronze Age. Artefacts found during the excavation are housed in Bury Museum.

The early Anglo-Saxons who gave Ramsbottom its name progressively felled the woodland during the Middle Ages. Ramsbottom became an area of scattered woods, farmsteads, moorland and swamp with a small community of families until the late 18th century.

=== Industrial Revolution ===
Ramsbottom developed during the 19th century as a manufacturing and mill town on the road from Bury to Haslingden by the River Irwell; its suburbs stretched south to Hazelhurst and north to Stubbins. Mills were built for spinning, weaving and printing. Square Mill was, in its day, innovative in combining many such processes under one roof.

With a readily available source of water power, Sir Robert Peel purchased land in Ramsbottom in the late 18th century to commence a major manufacturing career. It is this exchange that effectively founded Ramsbottom as a homogeneous settlement; the factory system, and Industrial Revolution facilitated a process of unplanned urbanisation in the area, contributing to it becoming an important and populous mill town.

The Grant Arms Hotel in Market Place was the home of William and Daniel Grant, 19th century industrialists closely associated with the rise of the town and reputed to be the inspiration for the Cheeryble brothers in Nicholas Nickleby by Charles Dickens. The Grants' employees were paid in tokens that had to be redeemed at a public house owned by the company. The landlord converted the tokens into cash, but only after deducting threepence per person, which had to be spent on beer, a variation on the truck system. The Grant Arms Hotel closed in 2018 and is currently being developed as offices, this has now been completed.

A network of roads and railways routed through Ramsbottom allowed for a series of diverse industries, including calico-printing, cotton spinning, machine-making, rope-making and iron and brass founding. Imports of foreign goods during the mid-20th century precipitated the decline of these sectors.

== Governance ==
From the Middle Ages, Ramsbottom was an area in the township of Lower Tottington, in the parish of Bury, and Salford hundred in Lancashire. It was part of the Bury Poor Law Union formed in February 1837, overseen by a Board of 25 Guardians including three from Tottington Lower End using the old workhouses at Bury, Radcliffe, Pilkington and Heywood until a new workhouse at Jericho opened in 1857. In 1864 the Ramsbottom Local Board of Health was formed for the Ramsbottom area in Tottington Lower End township.

In 1883, parts of Elton, Tottington Higher End and Walmersley with Shuttleworth townships were added to the area of the local board. In 1894, the area of the Local Board became Ramsbottom Urban District. Parts of Bury Borough and Walmersley with Shuttleworth civil parish were added to the urban district in 1933. The urban district was dissolved in 1974 and the Central, East, South and West wards were included in Bury Metropolitan Borough and the remainder in the Rossendale District of Lancashire.

Ramsbottom is part of the Bury North constituency which was created in 1983 from parts of the former seats of the former Rossendale and Bury and Radcliffe constituencies. The area was Conservative from 1983 to 1997, when it was gained by Labour who lost in 2010 back to the Conservatives. The seat was regained by Labour in the 2017 general election. In addition, the 2018 local council elections saw Labour gain the Ramsbottom ward. In line with the national swing in 2019, Bury North was lost back to the Conservatives, and it is now the most marginal constituency in England, with a majority of 105 votes.However the Bury North constituency was regained by Labour in the 2024 UK general election by James Frith with 19625 votes, a majority of 6944 votes.

== Geography ==
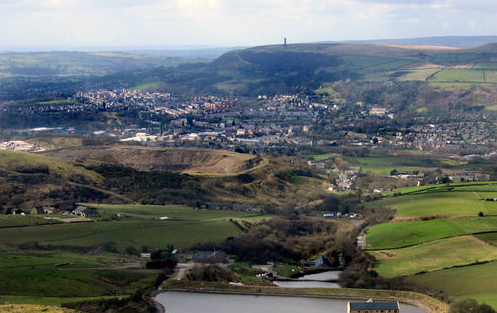
Ramsbottom lies amongst the South Pennines

The Ramsbottom parish formed in 1844 was a mile and a quarter in length and about three-quarters of a mile in width in the Lower Tottington township in the valley of the River Irwell that extends from Bury to Rossendale. It is bounded to the south by Holcombe Brook and Summerseat; to the north by Edenfield, Irwell Vale, Stubbins and the hamlets of Chatterton and Strongstry; to the west by Holcombe and to the east by Shuttleworth and Turn Village.

The area is characterised by its position on the south side of the West Pennine Moors. The high ground rises sharply on either side of the town with Holcombe Moor, Harcles Hill and Bull Hill to the west and Top O' Th' Hoof, Harden Moor, Scout Moor and Whittle Hill to the east.

== Transport ==
=== Railway ===
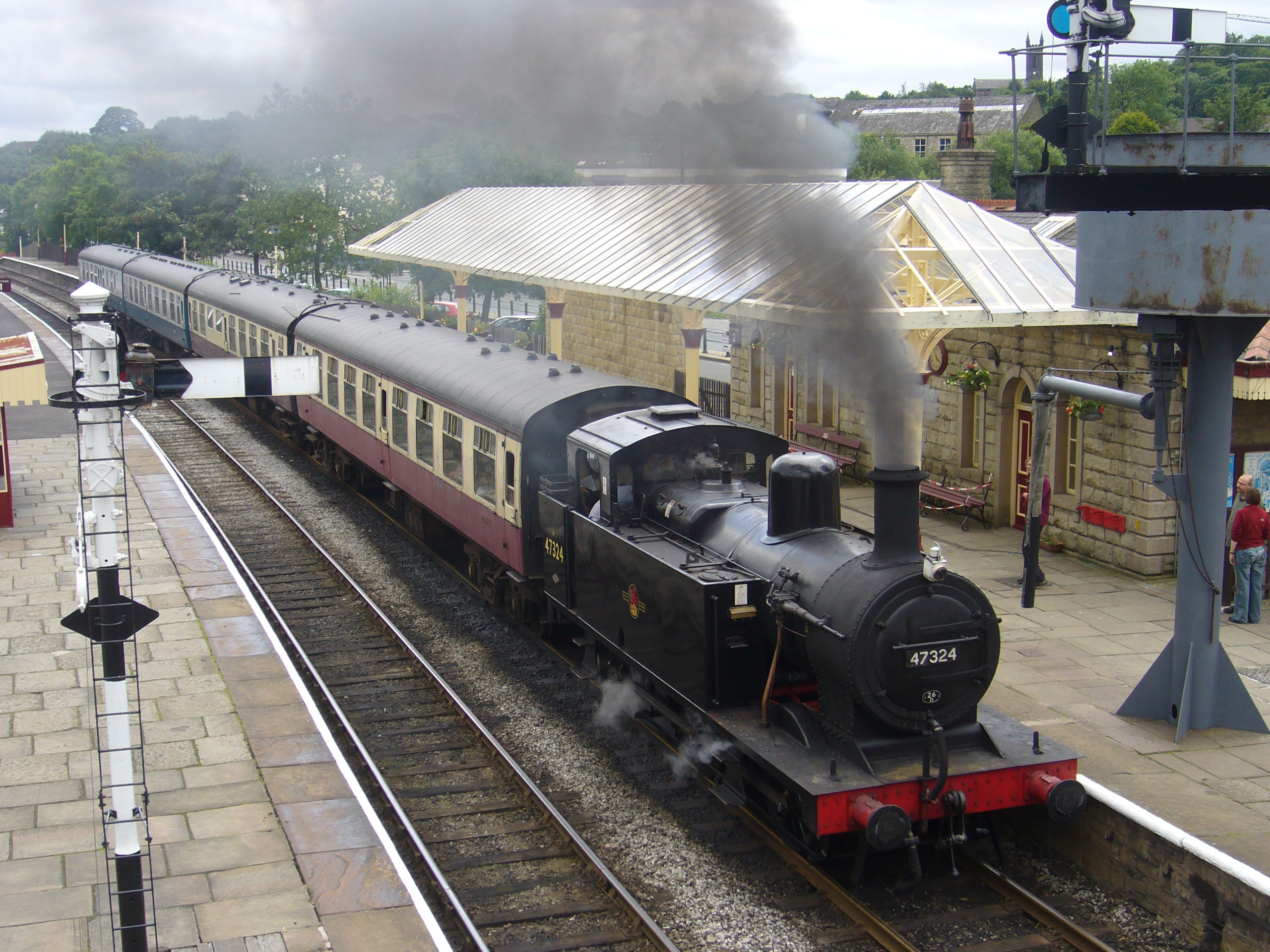
LMS 'Jinty' 0-6-0T No. 47324 at Ramsbottom railway station, 2007

The railway arrived in Ramsbottom in 1846 when the Manchester, Bury and Rossendale Railway Company built the railway from Bury to a junction with the Manchester and Bolton Railway; it extended the line northwards to Rawtenstall and opened Ramsbottom railway station in the town centre.

The line between Bury and Rawtenstall remained open to passengers until 1972 and for goods until 1980. This line is now used by the heritage East Lancashire Railway, which opened in 1987. It operates every weekend throughout the year, with additional services on some Wednesdays, Thursdays and Fridays between Easter and the end of September.

=== Roads ===
The district straddles the A676, A56 and B6214 roads with its centre four miles (six kilometres) north of Bury, four miles (six kilometres) south of Rawtenstall and six miles (ten kilometres) north-east of Bolton.

The M66 motorway runs to the east of the town, linking it north to the M65 and south to the M62 and the M60 Manchester Outer Ring Road.

== Landmarks ==
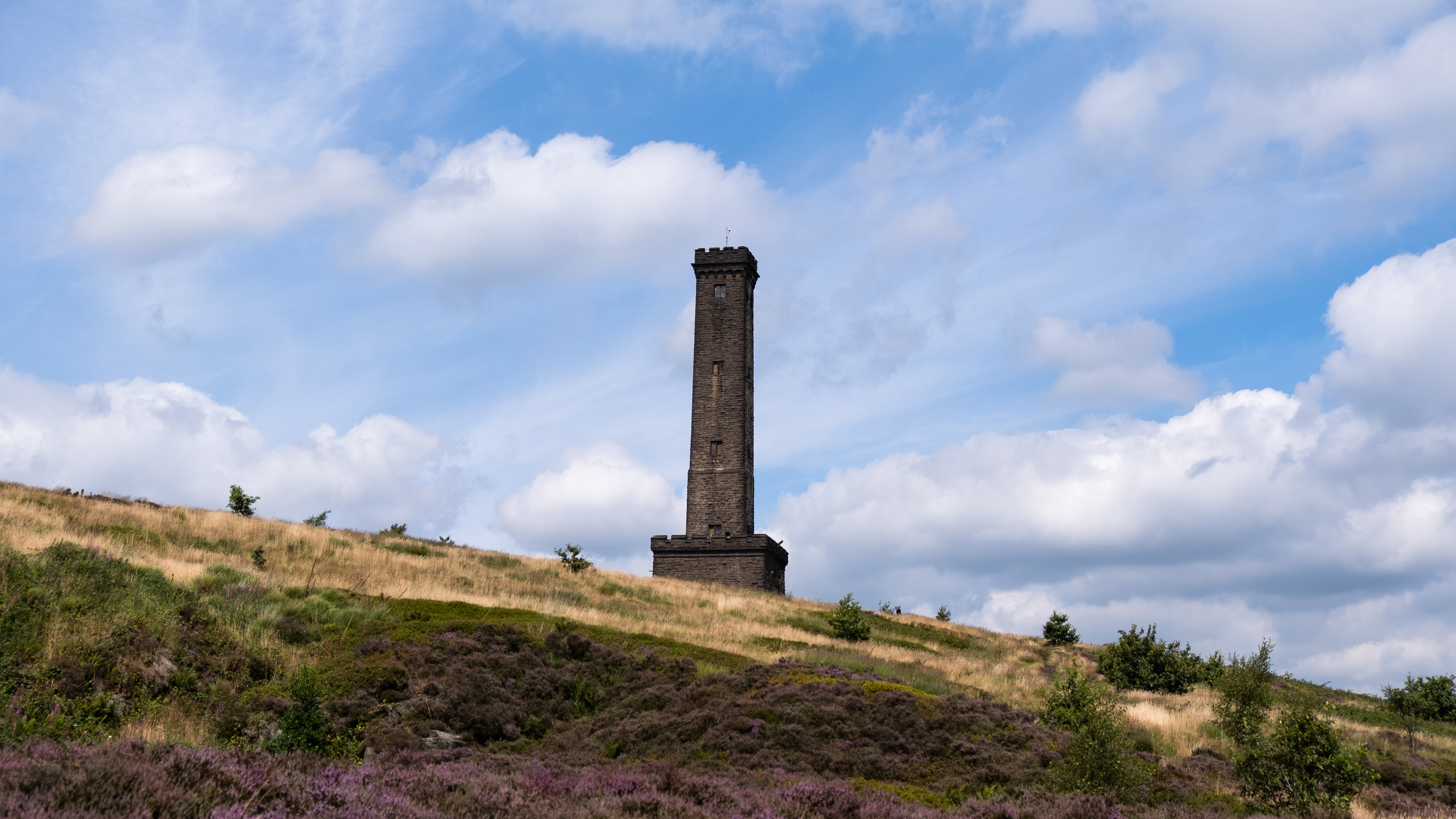
The Peel Monument in 2022

The skyline is dominated by the Peel Monument which stands on Holcombe Moor, a memorial to Sir Robert Peel, the 19th-century British Prime Minister and creator of the modern British police force. The tower stands 128 feet (39.0 m) tall on Holcombe Moor. There are views over West Yorkshire, North Lancashire, Greater Manchester, North Wales and the Lancashire Plain. From the top of the monument, it is possible to see Blackpool Tower on a clear day.

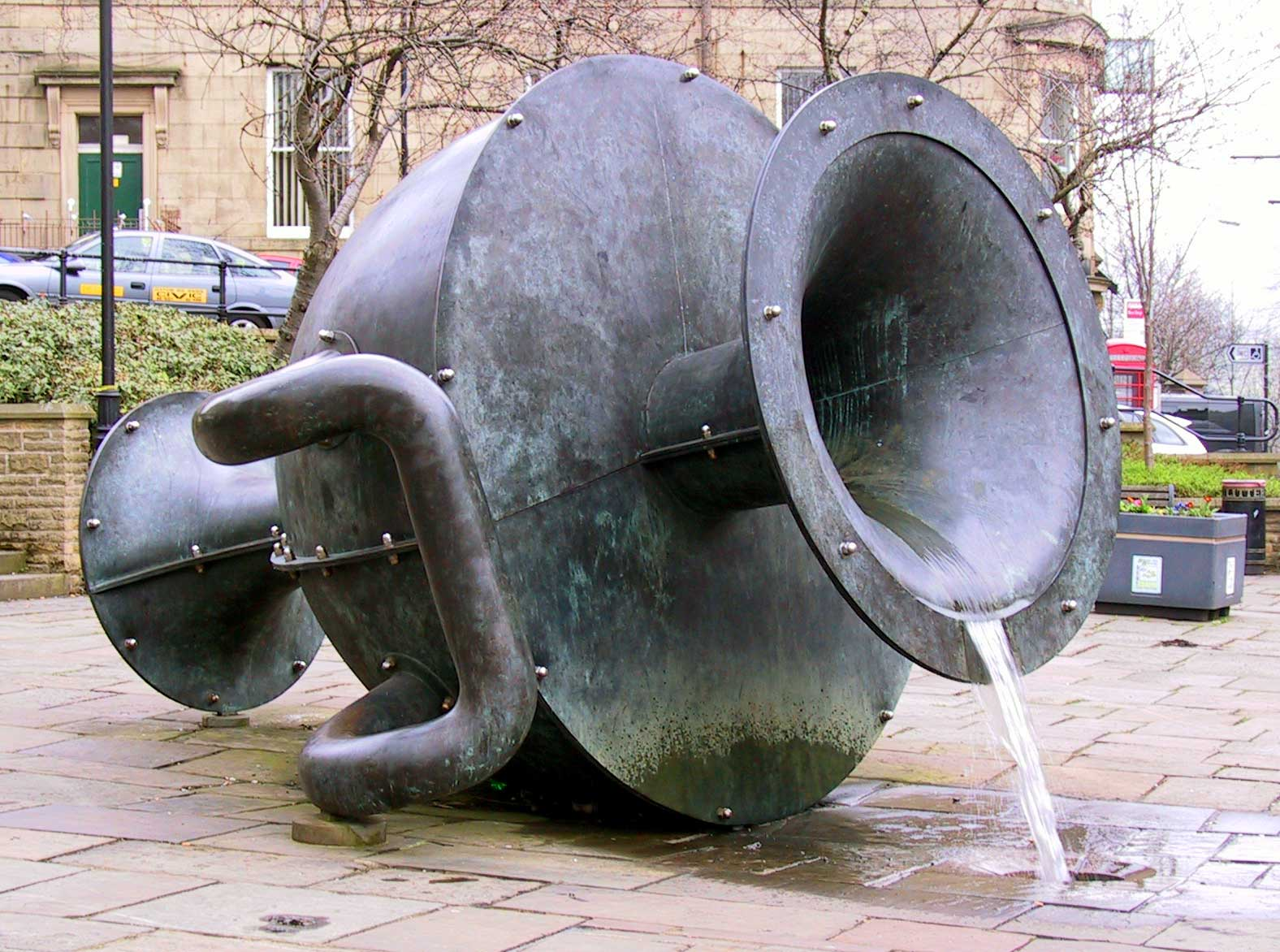
Edward Allington's sculpture Tilted Vase in the centre of Ramsbottom, 2005

Ramsbottom is on the path of the Irwell Sculpture Trail. The Tilted Vase by Edward Allington, a sculpture both classical in shape to reflect the surrounding buildings but apparently bolted together to reflect the old industries, is located in Market Place. This piece of work, weighing around two tons and locally known as "the Urn" or "Urnie", was funded with £250,000 of National Lottery money.

Nuttall Park is a large park with facilities for bowls, tennis, football and public events. The park hosts regular fun fairs and family events, and is a popular attraction with locals and tourists alike.

== Education ==
In 1841, cotton mill owners, the Ashtons built a day school in Crow Lane which was used as a Sunday school and for church services.

- Edenfield CE Primary, Stubbins Community Primary, St Joseph's RC Primary, St Andrew's CE Primary, Hazelhurst County Primary, Emmanuel Holcombe CE Primary, Holcombe Brook Community Primary, Summerseat Methodist Primary, Peel Brow Primary.
- Rossendale School, founded in 1989, is a specialist residential and day school for children aged eight to 16 with behavioural, emotional and social difficulties.
- Woodhey High School
- Darul Uloom Islamic College.

== Religion ==
St Andrew's Church, the oldest church in Ramsbottom, was built by the Grant family in 1834 as a Scottish Presbyterian Church. In the 1860s, a member of the Grant family deprived the congregation of its church and offered the building to the Bishop of Manchester as an Anglican church in 1869. It became a mission church for St Paul's Church, Ramsbottom until 1875, when it was consecrated as the Parish Church of St Andrew. In 1993, the church was refurbished, reordered and dedicated in 1994. The Ashton brothers donated farm land as site for St Paul's Church which cost £3,400. It was consecrated in 1850.

The Anglican Churches in Ramsbottom are part of the Ramsbottom & Edenfield Team Ministry comprising Christ Church Baptist Methodist Church, Dundee United Reformed Church, Greenmount United Reformed Church, Ramsbottom Pentecostal Church, Ramsbottom Evangelical Church, St Andrew's CE Church, St Joseph's Roman Catholic Church, St Paul's CE Church and Darul Uloom Islamic College.

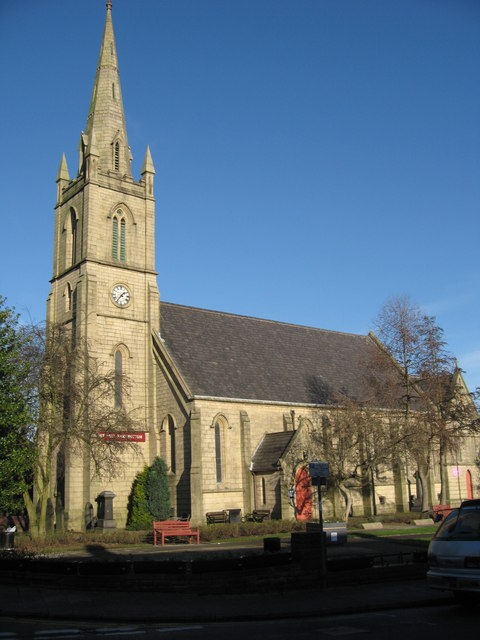
St. Paul's CE Church, 2007

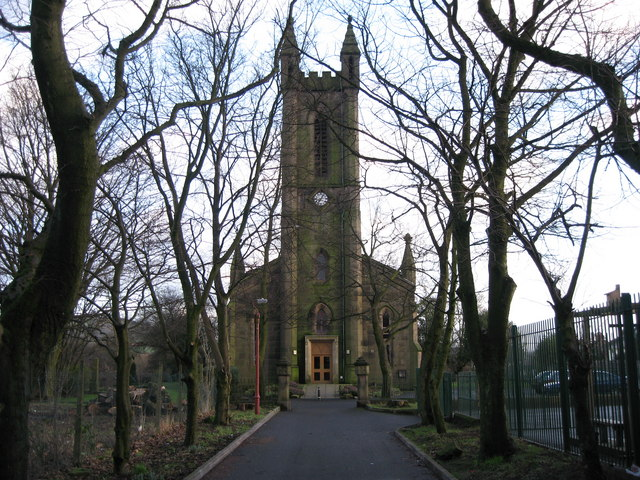
St. Andrew's CE Church, 2007

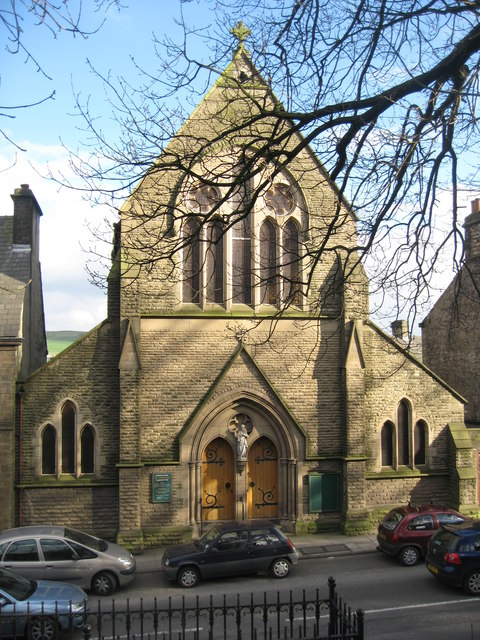
St. Joseph's RC Church, 2007

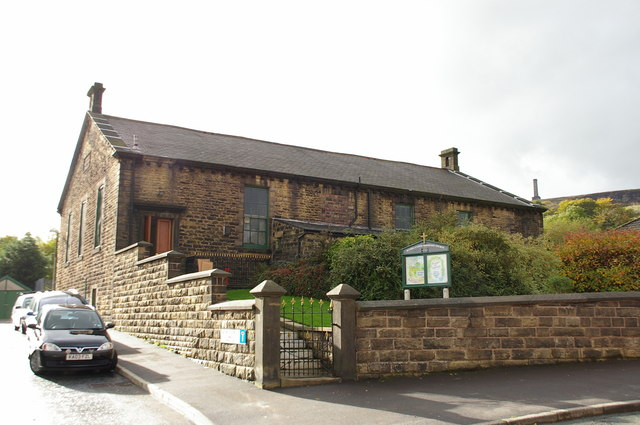
Dundee United Reformed Church, 2005

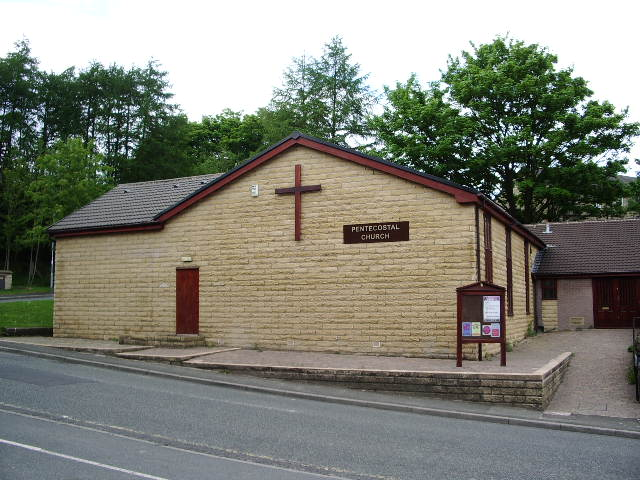
Ramsbottom Pentecostal Church, 2007

== Sport ==
Ramsbottom Cricket Club plays in the Lancashire League. The team has included professional players such as Seymour Nurse (West Indies), Chris Harris (New Zealand), Brad Hodge (Australia and Lancashire CCC), Ian Harvey (Australia and currently Derbyshire CCC), Ian Chappell (Australia) and Michael Clarke (Australia Captain). Its ground, close to Ramsbottom railway station, has a reputation as being one of the best and most picturesque in the North West of England.

Ramsbottom United F.C. play in the Northern Premier League Division One North, level 8 in the Football League System. They were crowned champions of the North West Counties League at the end of the 2011–12 season. The club's home games are played at its floodlit pitch, the Riverside Ground, which has a capacity of 2,000 and is adjacent to the cricket ground.

== Culture and community ==
Hundreds of people climb Holcombe Hill on Good Friday. A smaller gathering keeps alive the tradition of egg rolling before the start of the climb. Large gatherings on the hill are visible from miles away, and occasionally attract unorthodox religious preachers. In recent years, the celebrations have become more secular, with the public house at the bottom of Holcombe Hill attracting as many as 3,000 visitors leading to complaints from residents and restrictions being imposed by the council.

Ye Olde Gamecock Show, an exhibition of game fowl is held in the town on New Year's Day. The show was held at The Old Dun Horse from 1843 until it closed in 2010 and has since been hosted by the Ramsbottom branch of the Royal British Legion. This competitive show replaced the annual cockfight that took place in the town square after the New Year Holcome Hunt. The exhibition, organised by the Holcombe Old English Game Fowl Club, is said to be the oldest gamecock show in the world.

The Theatre Royal Ramsbottom, a registered charity run mainly by volunteers of The Summerseat Players, produce up to nine performances each season, as well as performances by the theatre's Young Company. They also host comedy nights, live music nights and visiting productions from local theatre companies. The amateur dramatic group was formed in 1968, and performed at St Winifred's Church Hall in Summerseat. In 1990, with donations and loans from members and enthusiasts, the company purchased the Theatre Royal on Smithy Street in Ramsbottom.

Ramsbottom hosts an annual rhythm & blues festival. A former pub, the Corner Pin, was where the band Elbow played their first gig. The Ramsbottom Recorded Music Society was formed in 1967 to promote an interest and appreciation of music and meets bi-weekly on Thursday evenings at Christ Church Neighbourhood Centre.

The Black Pudding Throwing World Championships are held annually at the Royal Oak (now the Oaks) pub on Bridge Street. Participants have to toss black puddings in an attempt to dislodge a stack of Yorkshire puddings on plinths on two levels (one for children, the other for adults). The winner is the one who dislodges most Yorkshire puddings in three attempts.

TNT Express is found at the heart of Ramsbottom, with staff from all over Lancashire. The office was based originally in Stubbins, but moved to Railway Street following big cuts in 2017.

== Notable people ==
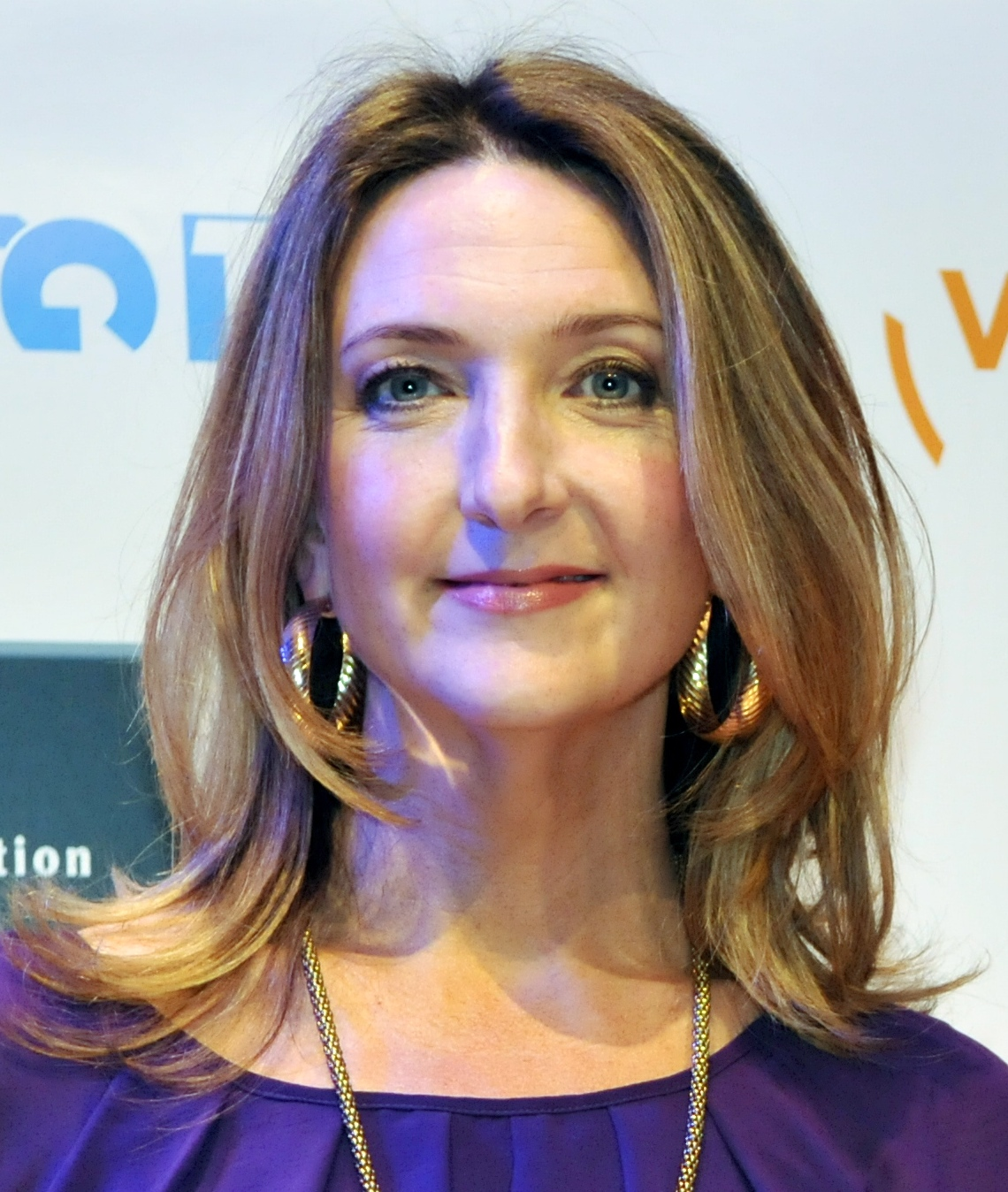
Victoria Derbyshire, 2011

- James Campbell McInnes (1874–1945), classical baritone singer.
- Victoria Derbyshire (born 1968), journalist, newsreader and broadcaster.
- Henry Holland (born 1983), fashion designer, businessman and blogger.
- Bugzy Malone (born 1990), rapper and actor.

=== Sport ===
- Tom Kay (1883–1934) footballer, played 221 games for Bury
- Ellis Crompton (1886–1953) footballer with over 350 club caps
- Alf Tootill (1908–1975) a football goalkeeper with 373 club caps
- John Savage (1929–2008) cricketer for Leicestershire and Lancashire, played 347 First-class cricket games
- Alan Ormrod (born 1942) a former cricketer, played 500 First-class cricket games
- Tim Greaves (born 1956) a former racing driver, drove in the 24 Hours of Le Mans between 2004 and 2010.

== Media ==
The area is covered by the Bury Times, Lancashire Telegraph and Rossendale Free Press newspapers.

News and sport in the area are covered by BBC Radio Lancashire and BBC Radio Manchester and by Rossendale Radio, a community radio station until it ceased broadcasts in March 2012. For free to air television, the area is within the BBC North West and ITV Granada regions.

In 2015, the first podcast for Ramsbottom (This is Rammy) launched which went on to win the award for UK Best Places and Travel in the very first UK Podcasters Awards that took place in The Midland Hotel, Manchester. This is an annual awards ceremony voted for by the listeners and community behind each podcast.

In 2014, a scene from A Monster Calls was filmed at the Ramsbottom railway station crossing.

== See also ==
- List of people from the Metropolitan Borough of Bury
- Trolleybuses in Ramsbottom
