= Ellis Crompton =

English footballer

Personal information
- Full name: George Ellis Crompton
- Date of birth: 17 July 1886
- Place of birth: Ramsbottom, England
- Date of death: 17 May 1953 (aged 66)
- Place of death: Barnstaple, England
- Positions: Right half; inside right

Senior career*
Years	Team	Apps	(Gls)
- Padiham
1906–1910	Blackburn Rovers	35	(20)
1910–1911	Tottenham Hotspur	8	(0)
1912–1913	Exeter City	31	(10)
1913–1921	Bristol Rovers	149	(36)
1921–1925	Exeter City	145	(6)
1922	→ Bristol Rovers (loan)	1	(0)
- Barnstaple Town
- Llanelly
- Barry Town
- * Club domestic league appearances and goals

George Ellis Crompton (17 July 1886 – 1953) was a professional footballer who played for Padiham, Blackburn Rovers, Tottenham Hotspur, Exeter City, Bristol Rovers, Barnstaple Town, Llanelly and Barry Town.

== Football career ==
Crompton began his football career at Padiham before joining Blackburn Rovers in 1906 where he played in 35 matches and scored 20 goals between 1906 and 1910. The right half could also slot in to the inside right position joined Tottenham Hotspur where he featured in 10 matches in all competitions. After leaving White Hart Lane Crompton joined Exeter City where he made 31 appearances in the Southern League, scoring 10 goals during the 1912–13 season, before joining then-Southern League side Bristol Rovers in 1913. He made a total of 108 Southern League appearances, scoring 26 times in a spell that was interrupted by World War I and played a further 41 games in Division Three after Rovers joined The Football League in 1920. Crompton re-joined Exeter City in 1921 to make 145 appearances and netting six goals. He played for non-League clubs Barnstaple Town, Llanelly and Barry Town before retiring in 1925.
