= Rossendale Free Press =

Weekly newspaper in Chadderton, England

- Type: Weekly newspaper
- Owner: Reach plc
- Circulation: 1,834 (as of 2023)
- Website: rossendalefreepress.co.uk

The Rossendale Free Press is a weekly newspaper that covers the geographical Rossendale Valley and Uplands published in Chadderton, Greater Manchester, England with news coverage centred on the four main towns of Rawtenstall, Bacup, Haslingden, and Ramsbottom and surrounding villages. The paper is a weekly and comes out on a Friday although it is available in the shops on Thursday. The editorial offices in Rawtenstall closed following the consolidation of MEN Media's operations in central Manchester in May 2009; all their titles moved to Chadderton on the outskirts of Oldham in September 2010.

It is published by Reach plc.
