= Ramsbottom Evangelical Church =

Trinity Grace Church, Ramsbottom is a Protestant, Confessional, Reformed, Baptist, church situated in the town of Ramsbottom, Greater Manchester, England, now known as Trinity Grace Church. The church was a member of the Fellowship of Independent Evangelical Churches, but left in 2018. Trinity Grace Church is now a member of the Association of Confessional Baptist Churches (ACBC) UK, having adopted the Second London Baptist Confession of 1677/89 as its doctrinal standard and seeking to be confessional in its church polity. Close ties have been established with many churches in the region including Trinity Baptist Church Charlesworth and Bethany Evangelical Church in Leigh. It is also involved in active evangelism outreach in the town, including street preaching, door-to-door ministry, a 'Thursday Club' for youngsters, and courses for all ages. They host a biannual conference for young people called the Trinity Grace Conference. The church is also committed to the work of overseas missions and has strong connections with Kenya, Nigeria and Poland.

== Church History ==
The beginnings of Trinity Grace Church, Ramsbottom go back to Summerseat in the late 1950s when the Primitive Methodist Church invited Rev. Raymond Gregory, minister of Dundee Lane Congregational Church to minister to them. The Primitive Methodist building became unsafe due to river erosion and for a period of time the church held their meetings in a car garage on Robin Road.

1961 marked a turning point in the life of the Evangelical Church when younger men were invited to attend a Billy Graham crusade which resulted in a cross pollination of religious ideals from the United States with those of 1960's England.

Later the church moved to the Summerseat Liberal Club and in 1963 to the Summerseat Co-op on a ten-year lease. When the lease on the Co-op building ran out, in 1973, the leaseholders would not re-new the contract. After that the church met in private homes until 1976 when it moved to its present location.

In 1998 Rev. Raymond Gregory retired and was replaced as Minister by Oliver Allmand-Smith. Since that time Tony Flanders and Rob Stredder have also been called to the ministry in the church. There have been several phases of expansion to the building which is located next to the level crossing in the centre of the town.
