= Trolleybuses in Ramsbottom =

Ramsbottom trolleybus system
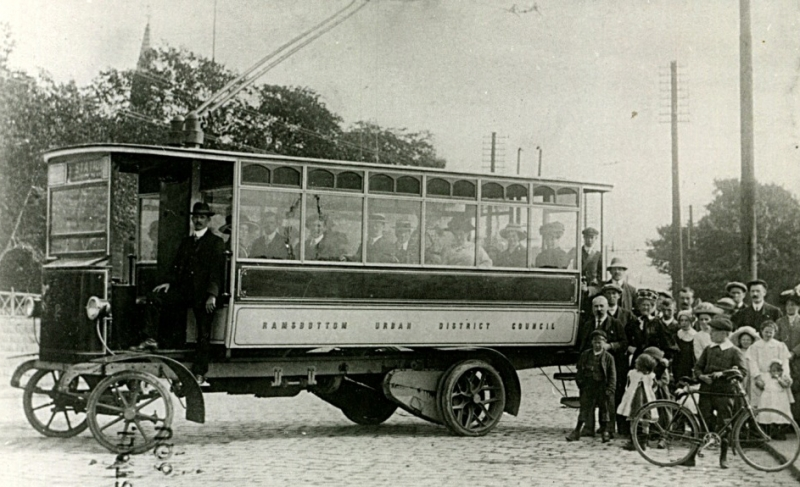
- A Ramsbottom trolleybus, c. 1913

Operation
- Locale: Ramsbottom, Lancashire, (now Greater Manchester), England
- Open: 14 August 1913
- Close: 31 March 1931
- Status: Closed
- Routes: 1
- Operator: Ramsbottom Urban District Council

Infrastructure
- Stock: 7 (maximum)

The Ramsbottom trolleybus system once served the town of Ramsbottom, then in Lancashire, but now in Greater Manchester, England.

== History ==
Opened on 14 August 1913, the Ramsbottom system was unusual in being a completely new one that was not replacing any previously operating tramway network. It was closed relatively early, on 31 March 1931, though it was largely replaced by motor buses on a faster timetable from 14 January 1929.

== Services ==
By the standards of the various now defunct trolleybus systems in the United Kingdom, the Ramsbottom system was very small, with only one route, from Holcombe Brook railway station to Edenfield, with a short branch from Market Place in Ramsbottom to Ramsbottom railway station, which closed on 5 October 1914. Buses ran half-hourly.

== Fleet ==
The system had a maximum fleet of only seven trolleybuses.

None of the former Ramsbottom trolleybuses is recorded as having survived.

== See also ==
- History of Ramsbottom
- Transport in Ramsbottom
- List of trolleybus systems in the United Kingdom
