= Tom Kay (footballer, born 1883) =

English footballer

Personal information
- Full name: Thomas Kay
- Date of birth: 24 April 1883
- Place of birth: Ramsbottom, England
- Date of death: 1934 (aged 50–51)
- Height: 5 ft 8 1/2 in (1.74 m)
- Position: Inside forward

Senior career*
Years	Team	Apps	(Gls)
1902–1903	Blackburn Rovers	0	(0)
1903–1904	Nelson		
1904–1914	Bury	221	(74)
1914	Nelson		
Total		221	(74)
- * Club domestic league appearances and goals

Thomas Kay (24 April 1883 – 1934) was an English footballer who played in the Football League for Bury.
