= Tolcarne =

Name of multiple players in Cornwall, England

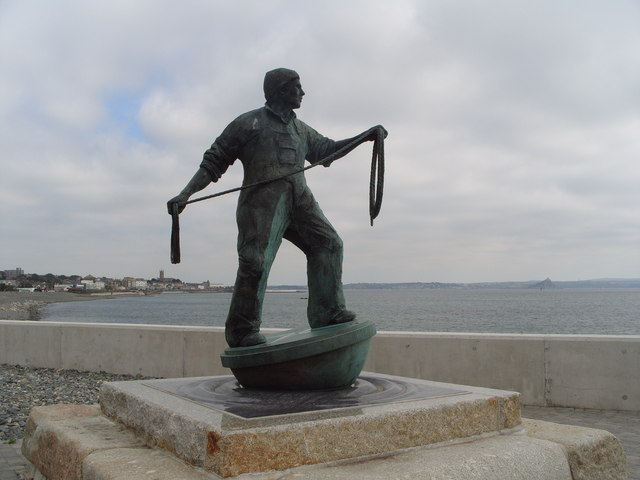
The fisherman statue at Tolcarne, Newlyn

Tolcarne (Cornish: Talkarn) is the name of a number of places in Cornwall, United Kingdom. The name Tolcarne is derived from Cornish Talkarn i.e. "hill-brow tor". A carn is a pile of stones (usually natural) and is the same as tor in Devon.

Talkarn is the old name of Minster (grid reference SX110904) near Boscastle.

Places named Tolcarne include,

- part of Newlyn on the east side of the Newlyn River (grid reference SW462290) and formerly a separate hamlet in the civil parish of Madron.
- A hamlet south of Camborne near Troon (grid reference SW655387).
- A hamlet in the parish and village of St Day (grid reference SW725421).
- Tolcarne (grid reference SW826513) and Lower Tolcarne (grid reference SW828509) in the parish of St Allen.
- A farm near Porkellis in the parish of Wendron (grid reference SW683348).
- Tolcarne Wartha (grid reference SW686352) and Little Tolcarne (grid reference SW685355). Wartha is higher in Cornish.
- Tolcarne (grid reference SW846382) and Tolcarne Wood (grid reference SW842386) in the parish of St Just-in-Roseland (grid reference SW846382).
- Tolcarne Point and Tolcarne Beach, Newquay (grid reference SW8162).
- Tolcarne (grid reference SX249783) and Tolcarne Tor (grid reference SX250786) are north-west of North Hill and Trebartha. Tolcarne near Trebartha was a manor recorded in the Domesday Book (1086) when it belonged to Tavistock Abbey. It was one of several manors held from the abbey by Ermenhald. There was land for 1 plough; there were 2 smallholders who had 2 oxen and one acre of pasture. The value of the manor was 5 shillings.
