= Townfield =

Village in County Durham, England

Coordinates: 54.830°N 2.077°W

- Location within County Durham
- OS grid reference: NY951483
- Unitary authority: County Durham
- Ceremonial county: County Durham
- Region: North East
- Country: England
- Sovereign state: United Kingdom
- Post town: CONSETT
- Postcode district: DH8
- Police: Durham
- Fire: County Durham and Darlington
- Ambulance: North East

Townfield is a village in County Durham, in England. It is situated just to the south of Hunstanworth and part of that parish, about 10 miles (16 km) west of Consett.

The lands were owned by the Hospital of St Giles which passed to William Paget at the dissolution. In 1545 Paget passed the lands to William Egliston and his descendants who held the lands until 1692 when the line ended. The land then passed to the Ord family of Newcastle.

Lead mining was an important industry from the 1650s onwards though most of the mining was centred at the nearby village of Ramshaw. The London Lead Company operated in the area from the 1700s to the 1850s when the Derwent Mining Company took over. By the 1950s mining had ceased.

Some of the buildings were designed by the architect S.S. Teulon in the 1860s as was much of Hunstanworth.
