= Tomperrow =

Hamlet in Cornwall, England

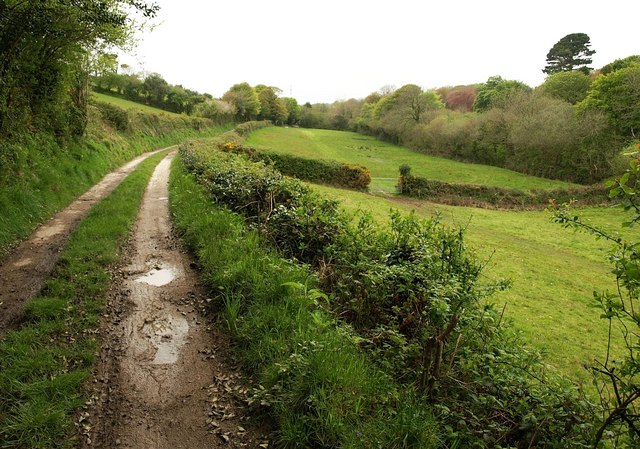
Bridleway near Tomperrow

Tomperrow is a hamlet between Threemilestone and Baldhu in Cornwall, England, United Kingdom.
