= Town Kelloe =

Coordinates: 54.725°N 1.450°W

- Location within County Durham
- OS grid reference: NZ354367
- Unitary authority: County Durham
- Ceremonial county: County Durham
- Region: North East
- Country: England
- Sovereign state: United Kingdom
- Post town: DURHAM
- Postcode district: DH6
- Police: Durham
- Fire: County Durham and Darlington
- Ambulance: North East

Town Kelloe is a small village in County Durham, in England. It is situated a short distance to the east of Kelloe.
