= Tosberry =

Hamlet in Devon, England

Coordinates: 50.967°N 4.478°W

- Location within Devon
- Population: 7
- OS grid reference: SS2621
- District: Torridge
- Shire county: Devon
- Region: South West
- Country: England
- Sovereign state: United Kingdom
- Post town: Bideford
- Postcode district: EX39
- Dialling code: 01237
- Police: Devon and Cornwall
- Fire: Devon and Somerset
- Ambulance: South Western
- UK Parliament: Torridge and West Devon

Tosberry (alternate spelling Tosbury) is a hamlet in the parish of Hartland, Devon, England, United Kingdom. It is situated 2.6 miles South of Hartland; the parish village, 14.3 miles West of its post town Bideford, and 12.7 miles North of the nearest town Bude in Cornwall. The hamlet gives its name to a stretch of moorland to the south of its location, an area adjacent to Bursdon Moor, a site of special scientific interest.

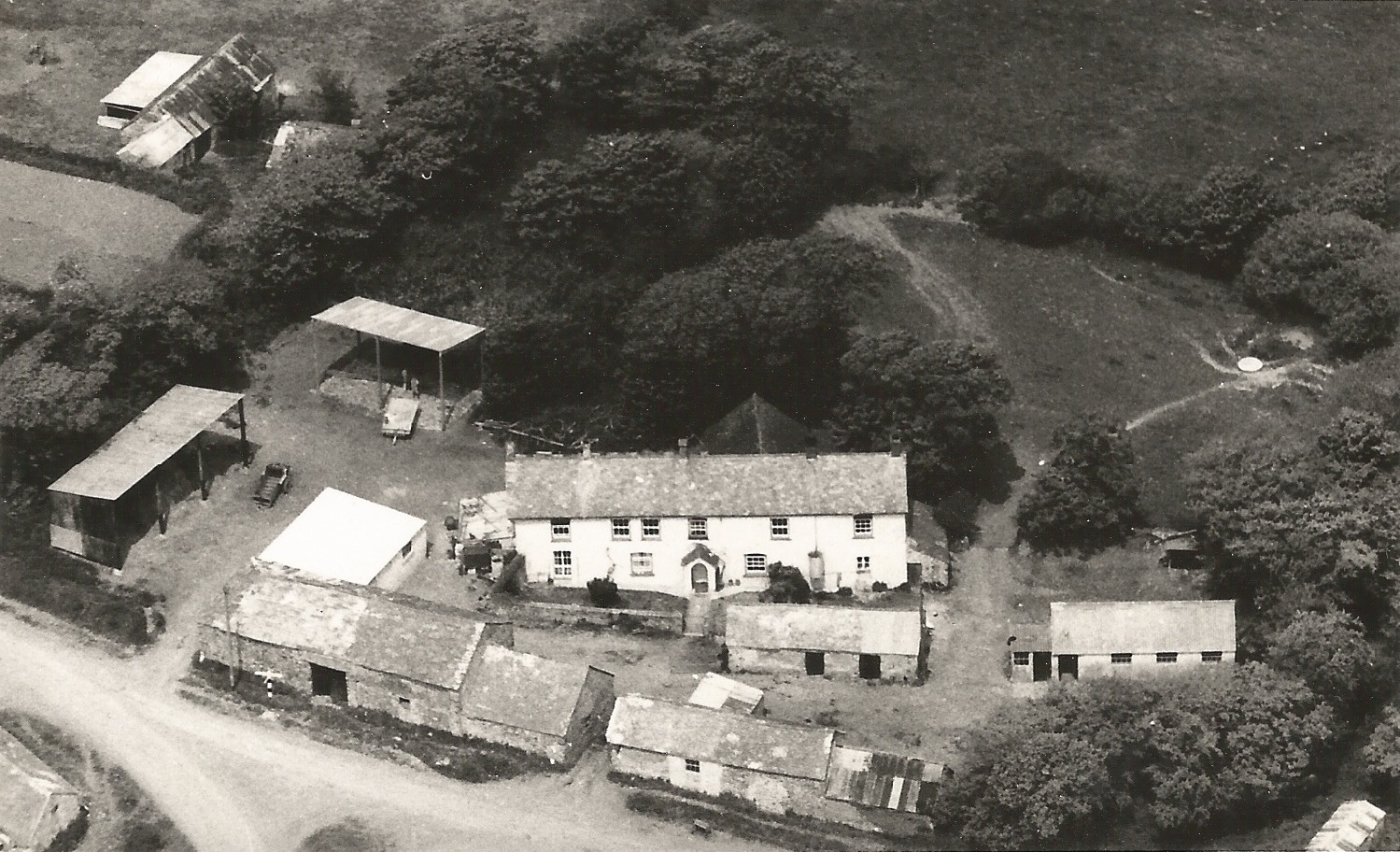
Aerial Photograph of East Tosberry Farm circa 1950s.

== History and Buildings ==
A round house is present at West Tosberry Farm, built adjacent to a barn that once housed a stationary threshing machine. The round house gave horses comfortable working conditions as they drove the machine by way of pulleys and belts. The building is still present today, although its use has changed. A carpentry and wheelwright was also present in the hamlet at Tosberry Grove, established at the turn of the twentieth century by William Walter, the son of Richard Walter, a local carpenter and wheelwright. William was a close friend of Thomas Cory Burrow, the editor of the Hartland Chronicle; the local newspaper at the time, and was also a founding member of Hartland Town Band.
