= Torbeg =

Coordinates: 55°31′N 5°19′W

Torbeg (Scottish Gaelic: An Tòrr Beag) is a village on the Isle of Arran in the Firth of Clyde, Scotland.
