= Toulvaddie =

Coordinates: 57.80337°N 3.85198°W

Toulvaddie: Scottish Gaelic: Toll a' Mhadaidh
- Location within the Highland council area
- OS grid reference: NH900808
- Council area: Highland
- Country: Scotland
- Sovereign state: United Kingdom
- Postcode district: IV20 1
- Police: Scotland
- Fire: Scottish
- Ambulance: Scottish

Toulvaddie (/tuːlˈvædi/; Scottish Gaelic: Toll a' Mhadaidh) is a hamlet, in the Tarbat peninsula, located in Tain, Ross-shire, Scottish Highlands and is in the Scottish council area of Highland.
