= Towan Cross =

Hamlet in Cornwall, England

Towan Cross is a hamlet northwest of Mount Hawke, Cornwall, England, United Kingdom.

Victory Inn known to be over 400 years old. Rear barn precedes building of Victory Inn. Location of the Settlement of Towan Cross: see Manor of Tynwarnhaille map.

Towan Cross and NT Wheal Charlotte featured at end of television series Wycliffe: series 1: The Pea Green Boat.
