= Totegan =

Coordinates: 58.583333°N 4.018775°W

- Location within the Sutherland area
- OS grid reference: NC8272667913
- Council area: Highland
- Lieutenancy area: Sutherland
- Country: Scotland
- Sovereign state: United Kingdom
- Post town: WICK
- Postcode district: KW1
- Dialling code: 01955
- Police: Scotland
- Fire: Scottish
- Ambulance: Scottish
- UK Parliament: Caithness, Sutherland and Easter Ross
- Scottish Parliament: Caithness, Sutherland and Ross

Totegan is a hamlet in Sutherland, Scotland and is one of the most northerly settlements in mainland Scotland. The nearest main road to the hamlet is the A386. The hamlet only has a few cottages.

Strathy Point Lighthouse, the first all-electric lighthouse in Scotland, is situated to the north of Totegan.

The nearest village is Strathy.

== History ==
The area has archaeological landscape evidence of prehistoric settlement, including a long-house.

== See also ==
- Extreme points of the United Kingdom
