= Toldish =

Hamlet in Cornwall, England

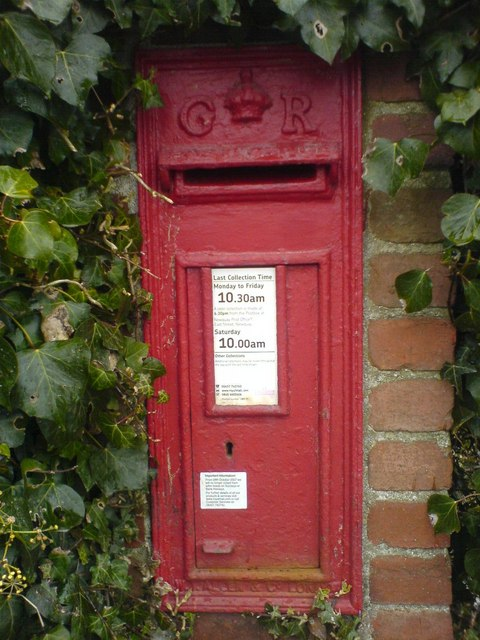
Toldish post box

Toldish is a hamlet in Cornwall, England. It is about 7 miles (11 km) east of Newquay, at the junction of A39 and A392, and north of Indian Queens.
