= Tornaveen =

Coordinates: 57°08′33″N 2°37′57″W

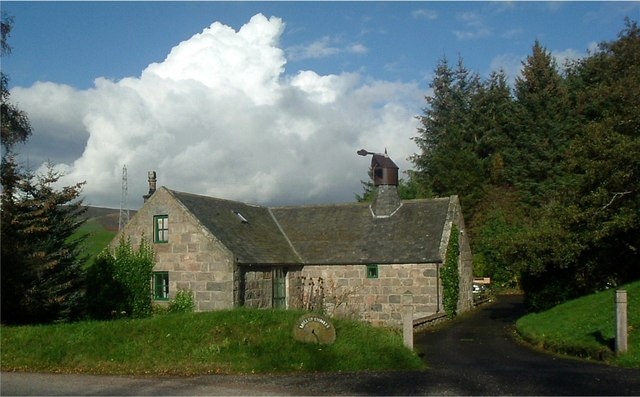
The Mill of Ennets, near Tornaveen, formerly a watermill

Tornaveen (Scottish Gaelic: Tòrr nam Fiann) is a district to the north of the small village of Lumphanan, Aberdeenshire, Scotland. It is on the Tarland to Aberdeen road and has approximately 150 residents.

It used to have a small shop but this has closed in recent years. Its most notable historical event apart from being near the place of Macbeth's death was the landing of a German balloon with three men on February 10/11 1929. The balloon had been blown across the North Sea during a storm and landed near Claydykes Farm on the B9119 road through Tornaveen. It had been in the air for 18 hours. Originally the tour had been planned just for a trip from Bitterfeld near Leipzig to Hanover. But then more and more wind came up and drove the balloon across the Netherlands towards the North Sea. Different attempts to land failed because of several reasons and so the three men crossed the North Sea within 12 hours. Finally they landed in a tree and stayed alive.

It is described in the Ordnance Survey name book of 1871 as "Three small croft houses, a grocers Shop, a Parish School and Chapel, the croft houses are all one Storey high partly Slated and partly thatched the Chapel a very plain building erected a few years ago by a general local Subscription, each of the three principal denominations viz. Established Free and United Presbyterians who were Subscribers have an equal right to its use, and therefore it belongs to no one class of religionists. the crofts etc. is the property of John Gordon Esqr. Cluny and others."

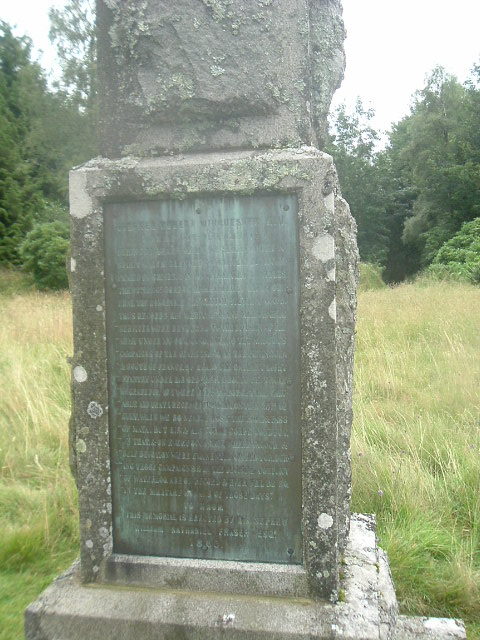
Tornaveen Obelisk

There is an Obelisk there "erected by William N Fraser Esqr. in 1865 in Memory of his Uncle Colonel Robert Winchester K. H. [Knight Hanover] who was one of the Peninsular Heroes".
