= Tolvaddon Downs =

Hamlet in Cornwall

Tolvaddon Downs is a hamlet in the parish of Illogan, Cornwall, United Kingdom.
