= Tolcarne Wartha =

Hamlet in Cornwall, England

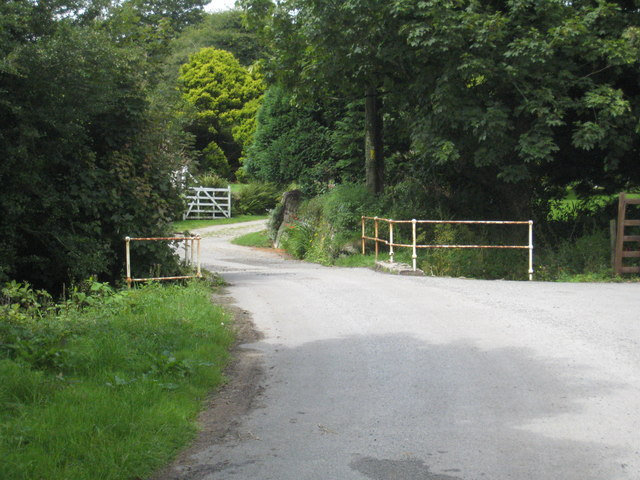
Bridge at Tolcarne Wartha

Tolcarne Wartha is a hamlet in west Cornwall, England, United Kingdom. It is between Porkellis and Four Lanes near the hill of Carnmenellis.
