= Alf Tootill (footballer, born 1908) =

English footballer

Personal information
- Date of birth: 12 November 1908
- Place of birth: Ramsbottom, England
- Date of death: 31 August 1975 (aged 66)
- Height: 5 ft 11 in (1.80 m)
- Position: Goalkeeper

Youth career
- Accrington Stanley
- Ramsbottom United

Senior career*
Years	Team	Apps	(Gls)
1926–1929	Accrington	31	(0)
1929–1932	Wolverhampton Wanderers	138	(0)
1932–1937	Fulham	203	(0)
1938–1939	Crystal Palace	1	(0)
- * Club domestic league appearances and goals

Alf Tootill (12 November 1908 – 31 August 1975) was an English footballer who played as a goalkeeper. During his career he played for Accrington Stanley, Wolverhampton Wanderers, Fulham and Crystal Palace. His career at Crystal Palace was interrupted by the Second World War.

Tootill retired from football in 1944 at the age of 36, although he did make a guest appearance for Ipswich Town during the 1945–46 season. He died in 1975, aged 66.
