= Alf Tootill (footballer, born 1913) =

English footballer

Personal information
- Full name: George Albert Tootill
- Date of birth: 29 October 1913
- Place of birth: Walkden, England
- Date of death: 29 July 1984 (aged 70)
- Place of death: Sheffield, England
- Height: 6 ft 0 in (1.83 m)
- Position: Defender

Youth career
- Chorley

Senior career*
Years	Team	Apps	(Gls)
1936–1938	Plymouth Argyle	9	(0)
1938–1947	Sheffield United	12	(0)
1947	Hartlepool United	18	(0)
- * Club domestic league appearances and goals

George Albert Tootill (29 October 1913 – 29 July 1984) was an English footballer who played as a defender. During his career he played for Plymouth Argyle, Sheffield United and Hartlepool United. He played his last match in 1947 for Hartlepool.
