= Tothill =

Hamlet in the East Lindsey district of Lincolnshire, England

Coordinates: 53°19′03″N 0°07′27″E

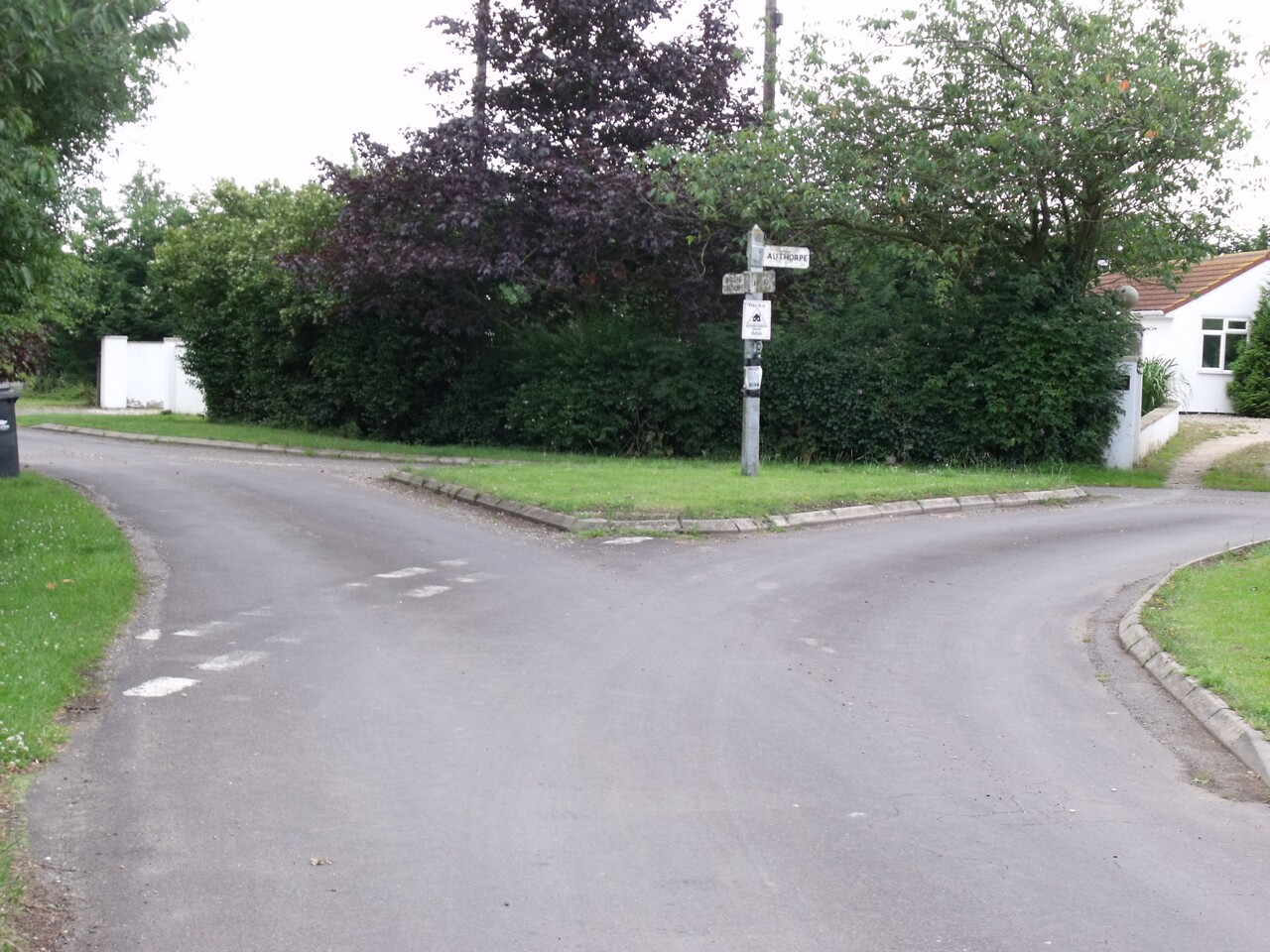

- Location within Lincolnshire
- OS grid reference: TF416820
  - London: 130 mi (210 km) S
- Civil parish: Withern with Stain
- District: East Lindsey
- Shire county: Lincolnshire
- Region: East Midlands
- Country: England
- Sovereign state: United Kingdom
- Post town: Louth
- Postcode district: LN13
- Police: Lincolnshire
- Fire: Lincolnshire
- Ambulance: East Midlands
- UK Parliament: Louth and Horncastle

Tothill is a hamlet in the civil parish of Withern with Stain, in the East Lindsey district of Lincolnshire, England. It is situated about 6 miles (10 km) south-east from Louth, and about 5 miles (8 km) north-west from Alford. In 1971 the parish had a population of 30. On 1 April 1987 the parish was abolished and merged with "Withern with Stain".

== Landmarks ==
The manor of Tothill belonged to Lord Willoughby De Broke. The manor house is a Grade II listed building. It was built in the 17th century, with early-18th-century refronting, and some 19th-century alteration.

Toot Hill is the remains of a medieval motte and bailey castle consisting of a large mound with double-ditched outer bailey. It is a Scheduled Ancient Monument.

The church of Saint Mary was built in the 18th century of brick on a stone base, with a chancel, but no bellcote. It had some 18th-century alterations and was demolished in 1980.
